= Aimé Morot =

French painter (1850–1913)

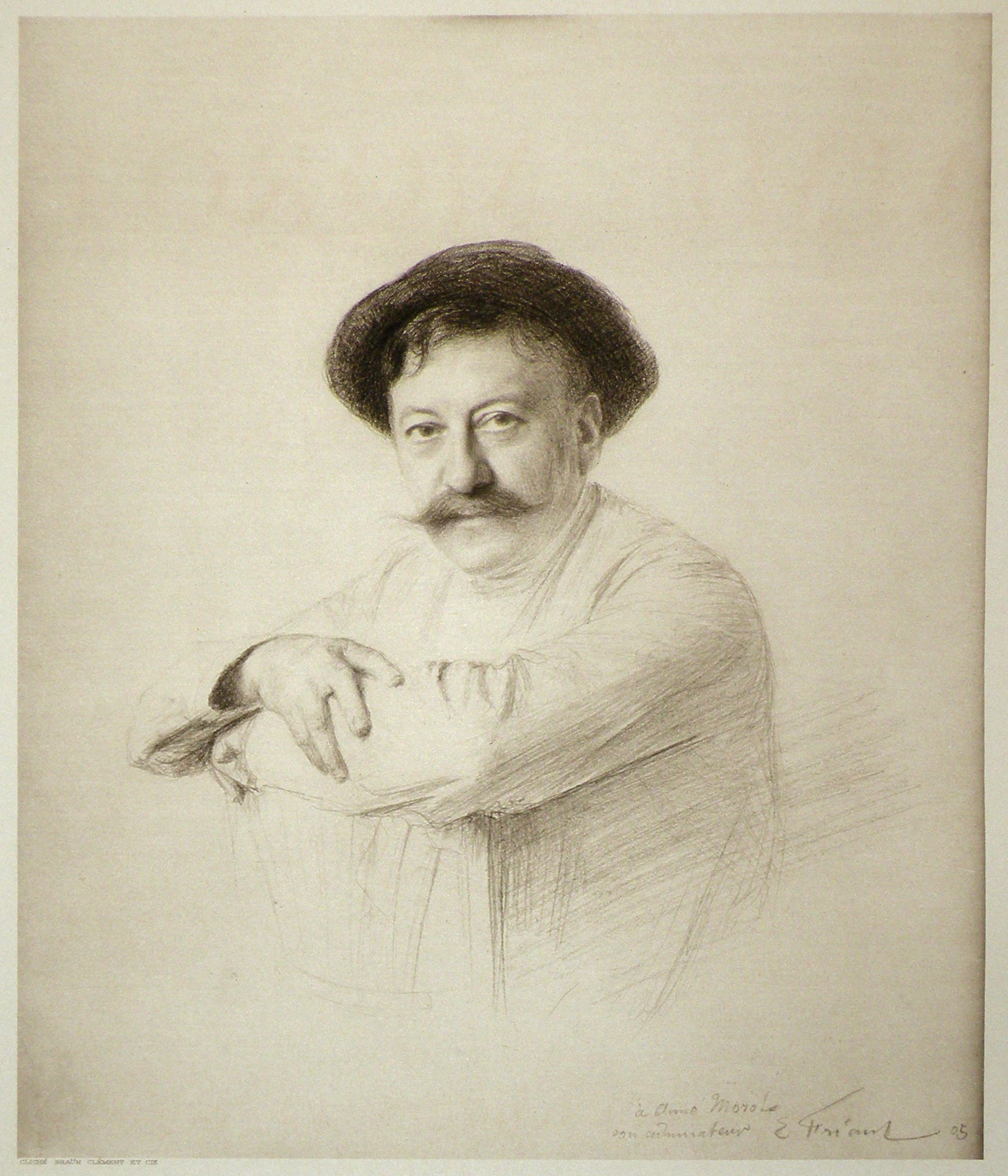
- Morot in 1905
- Born: Aimé Nicolas Morot; 16 June 1850; Nancy, France
- Died: 12 August 1913 (aged 63); Dinard, France
- Resting place: Le Cimetière Montmartre 18^{eme} division (Montmartre Cemetery), Paris
- Education: Thiéry, Charles François Sellier, Alexandre Cabanel
- Known for: Drawing, painting, sculpturing
- Notable work: Les Ambronnes, 1879; Le bon Samaritain, 1880; Rezonville, 1886; Reischoffen, 1870, 1889; Mademoiselle Madeleine Gérôme, 1890; Monsieur Edouard Detaille, 1899; Monsieur Gustave Eiffel, 1905; Ernest Hébert, 1905
- Awards: Grand Prix de Rome, 1873; first medal Salon de Paris, 1879; Medal of Honour Salon de Paris, 1880 Grand Prix of l'Exposition Universelle, Paris, 1900

Aimé Nicolas Morot (French: [ɛme nikɔla mɔʁo]; 16 June 1850 – 12 August 1913) was a French academic painter and sculptor.

== Biography ==
Aimé Nicolas Morot, son of François-Aimé Morot and Catherine-Elisabeth Mansuy, was born in Rue d'Amerval 4 in Nancy on 16 June 1850, and spent his youth in Rue de la Colline in Boudonville. At age 12 he started his studies in drawing, painting and gravure printing at the l'Ecole Municipal de Dessin et de Peinture de Nancy under Thiéry and the director of the school Charles Sellier. He continued his studies in Nancy until the late 1860s and subsequently attended the workshop of Alexandre Cabanel at the École Nationale Supérieure des Beaux-Arts in Paris, but could not study well in the noisy environment of Cabanel's workshop and left after having received two corrections by Cabanel. In the next two years he continued his studies independently studying in the Jardin des Plantes, where he developed his skills in observing and portraying animals. Despite his lack of attendance at the École, he won the Grand Prix de Rome in 1873 with his first submission, the Babylonian Captivity (Super Flumina Babylonis), which is currently in the collection of the École des Beaux-Arts in Paris.

The fellowship allowed him to travel to Italy and become a resident of the Villa Medici, where the French Academy in Rome was housed. Morot rarely set foot in his workshop in the Villa Medici, but still regularly produced paintings. His first submission to the Salon de Paris was awarded a third-class medal for the painting Spring (Printemps) in 1876. In 1877 he was awarded a second-class medal for Médée, for which a Roman woman called Victoria served as his model. He subsequently received a first-class medal in 1879 for Les Ambronnes and the Medal of Honour for The Good Samaritan in 1880, competing against Joan of Arc by the realist painter Jules Bastien-Lepage, who had also studied under Cabanel. According to Brauer (2013) The Good Samaritan was a protest against the continued poor treatment of the Paris Communards after their defeat in 1871.

Morot returned to Paris in 1880, where he met painter Jean-Léon Gérôme and married Suzanne-Mélanie Gérôme (1867–1941), one of the painter's four daughters, at the Mairie Drouot (Paris 9^{eme} Arrondissement, civil) and in the Sainte-Trinité church in 1887. Marriage witnesses included fellow painters Fernand Cormon and Charles Jalabert.

The family first lived in 18 rue de Chabrol, and in 1896 moved to a town house at 11 rue Weber, in Paris, the garden of which resembled a zoo housing snakes, lions, panthers, leopards and other exotic animals. He had two children, a daughter Aimée Morot (1901–1958) and a son Jean-Léon Morot (1908–1961). Suzanne-Mélanie Morot modelled for paintings in 1897 and, together with her daughter, in 1904. One of Morot's last contributions to the French Artists' Salon de Paris was a painting of his children called Brother and Sister (Frere et Soeur) in 1911.

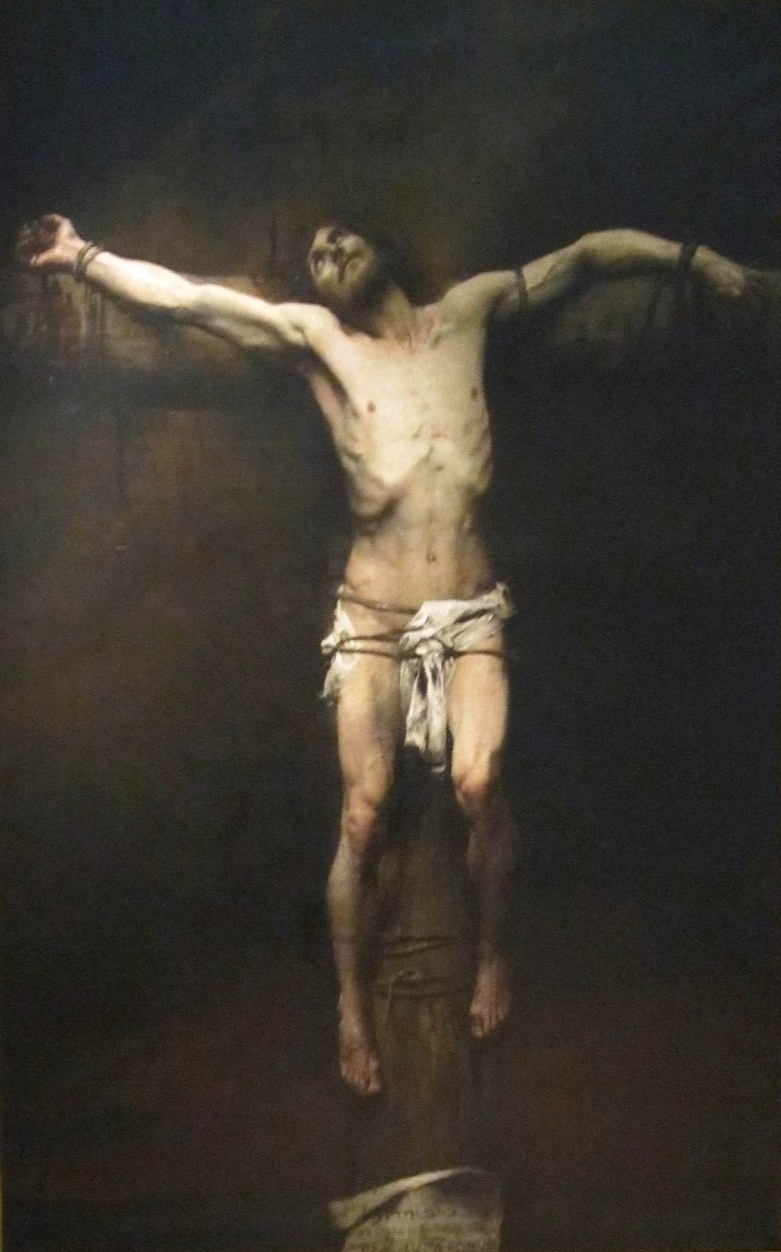
Martyre de Jésus de Nazareth, 1883. Musée des Beaux-Arts de Nancy, France.

In the 1880s, Morot worked at the Académie Julian, where he was a colleague of William-Adolphe Bouguereau (1825–1905) with whom he co-supervised the British cartoonist and illustrator Sir Leonard Raven-Hill (1867–1935) in 1885 and 1886. After Gustave Moreau's death in 1898, he led Moreau's studio at the institute. Theodor Pallady (1871–1956) and Gaston Hippolyte Ambroise Boucart (fr) (1878–1962), former pupils of Gustave Moreau, continued their studies under Aimé Morot. Charles Louis Auguste Weisser (Montbéliard, 1864–1940) was a student of both Aimé Morot and Jean-Léon Gérôme. Other French painters and engravers that were supervised by Morot were Hippolyte-Auguste Fauchon, Charles Baude (1853–1935), Charles Balay (1861–1943), Léon Fauché (1868–1951), Louis Prat (1879–1932) and Henry Jacquier (1878–1921).

In 1900, he won the grand prix of the l'Exposition Universelle (Paris Exhibition) and in the same year became professor at the École Nationale Supérieure des Beaux-Arts in Paris. Henry Golden Dearth (Bristol, 1864), a bronze medal winner at the same Paris Exhibition of 1900, was one of his British students, as were Dawson Dawson-Watson (1864–1939) and James Whitelaw Hamilton (1860–1932).

His American apprentice artists included Benjamin Foster (1852–1926), Edmund Clarence Messer (1842–1919; elected Principal of Corcoran School of Art in 1902), Gaylord Sangston Truesdell (1850–1899), George Henry Bogert (1864–1944), Georgia Timken Fry (1864–1921), Eurilda Loomis France (1865–1931) and Herbert Haseltine (1877–1962).

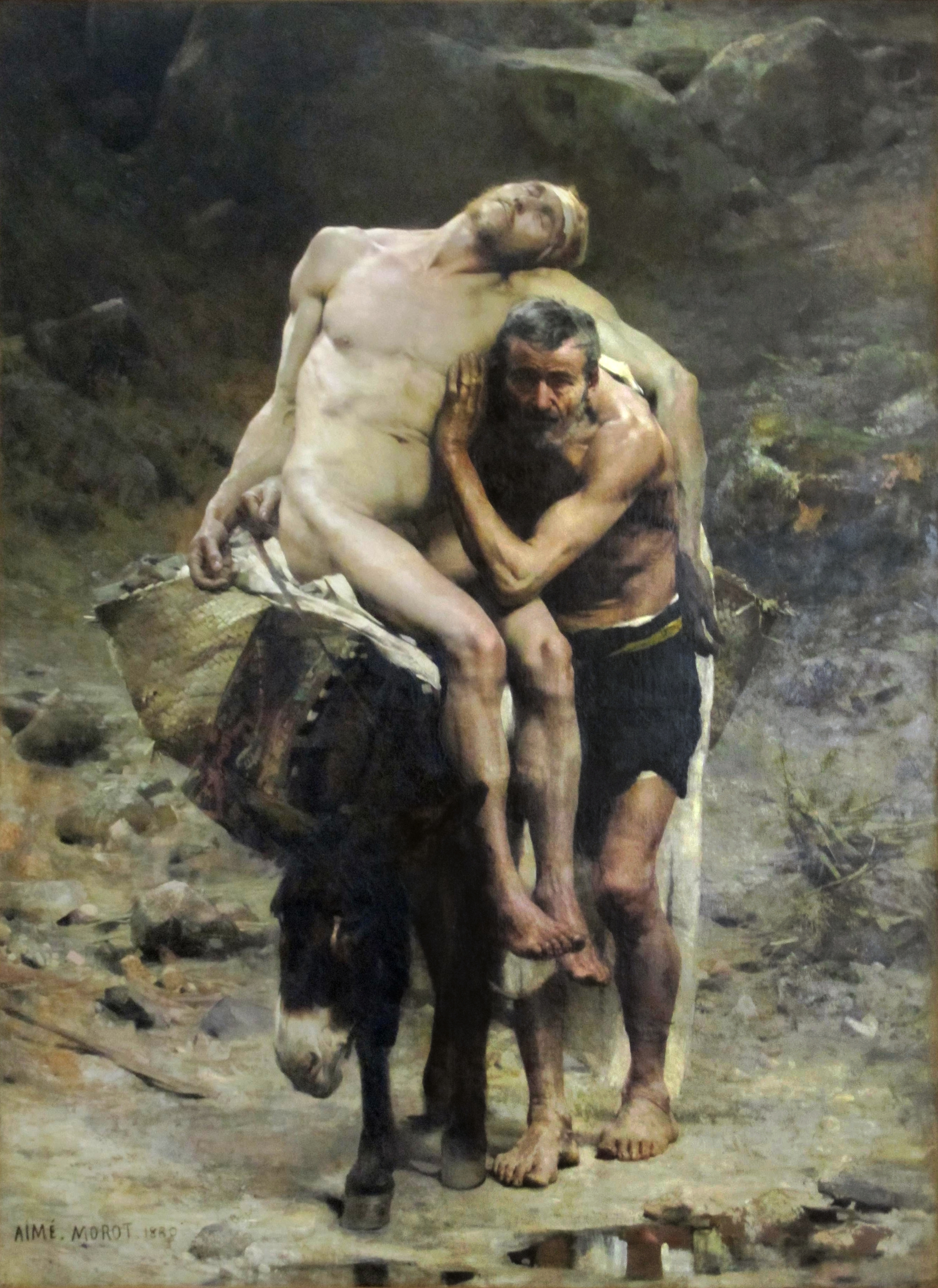
Le bon Samaritain (The good Samaritan), 1880.

In 1883 Morot was awarded the title of Chevalier (knight) in the Legion of Honour and in 1901 he became Officier (officer) in the Légion d'Honneur. As an academician and professor at the École Nationale Supérieure des Beaux-Arts who frequently exhibited at the French Artists' Salon in Paris and being a member of the painting jury, Aimé Morot was an influential person in the modern art centre of Paris, being among the 18 most influential members of the Institute and was included in Grün's painting "One Friday at the French Artists' Salon" in 1911. In 1912 he was awarded the distinction of Commandeur in the Légion d'Honneur. Morot contributed to the Salon until 1913 where he exposed a portrait of M. Paul Deschanel.

In 1910, Morot ordered the construction of a second house outside Paris, Maison dite Ker Arlette in Dinard, a coastal village in North-east Brittany. He lived there until his death after a lengthy illness on 12 August 1913. His death mask was cast in bronze using Lost-wax casting by Fonderie Valsuani, with which he had collaborated for casting bronzes (e.g. Baigneuse debout, Torse de femme). Obituaries were published in the 13 August 1913 edition of Gil Blas, the 16 August 1913 edition of L'Illustration and the 24 August edition of L'Immeuble & la Construction dans l'Est.

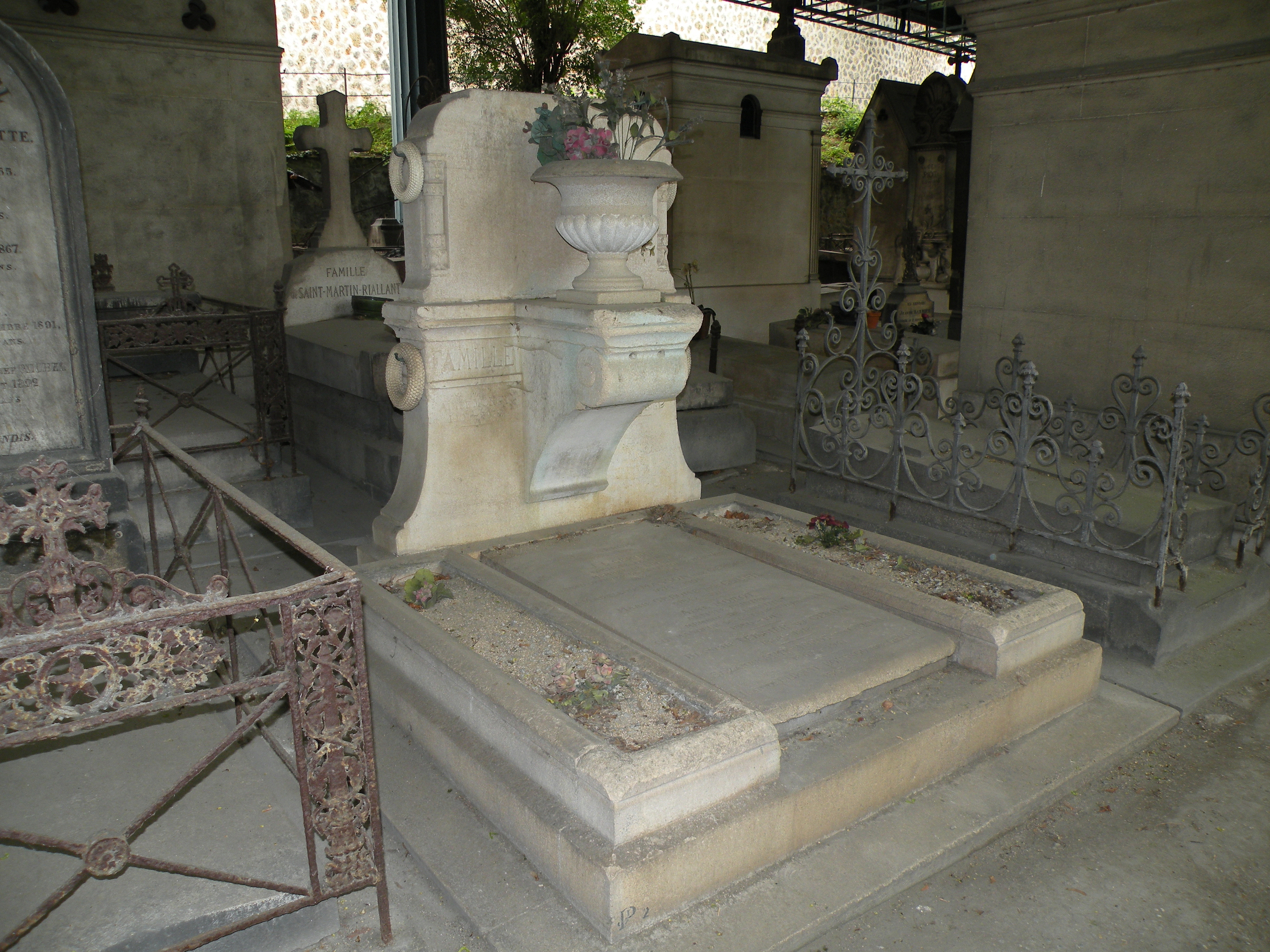
Grave of Jean Léon Gérôme, Aimé Morot and family (cimetière de Montmartre, 18th division)

Aimé Morot's brother was a well-known designer and locksmith in Nancy, who worked on the restoration of the 18th century gilded wrought-iron gates on Place Stanislas in Nancy, designed by Jean Lamour. His brother may have been the inspiration for his painting of The Blacksmith (Le Forgeron). His nephew Jacques Morot also became a painter and exhibited three paintings (portrait of an Arab Chleuch au chapelet, Despedida (l'adieu) and Château du Metz) in the Salon in 1922.

== Military genre, battle scenes ==
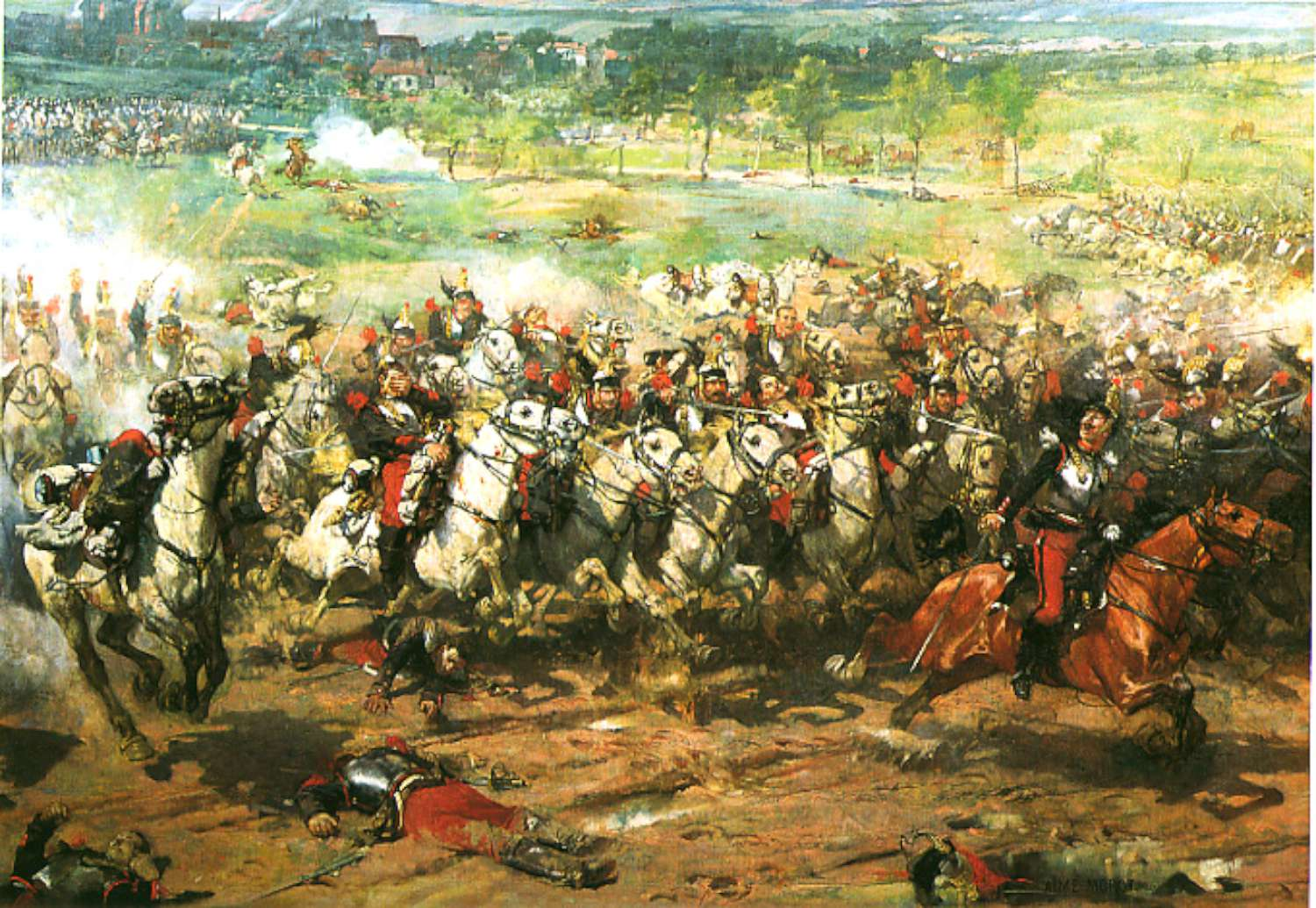
Aimé Morot, 1889. Battle of Reichshoffen, 1870.

Morot had been attached to the General Staff of the French Army, which had given him ample opportunity to study cavalry men and horses. To study the movement of the horses he used his eye as a camera by the use of a simple device that he could open and close rapidly in front of his eyes to better isolate the movements. This allowed him to vividly paint several historic cavalry charges from the Franco-Prussian War in 1870. Among the paintings exhibited at the Salon des Artistes Français were Cavalry charge at Rezonville (1886), 3^{ème} Cuirassiers a Helsass Hausen (1887) and Reischoffen (1887, exhibited in Musée de l'Histoire de France (Versailles)) and Prisonnier! or the Charge of cavalry at Gravelotte (1888).

== Society portraits ==
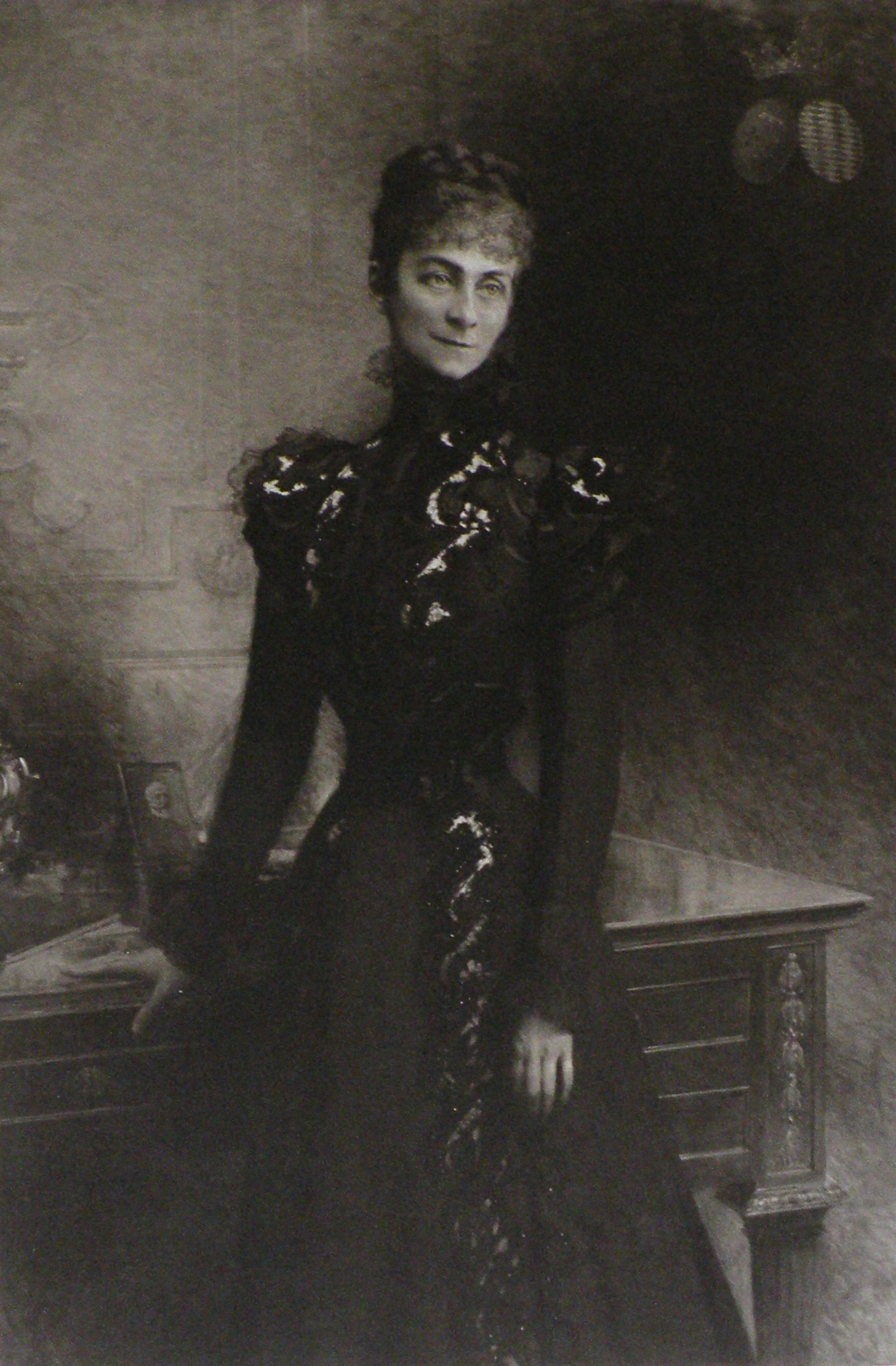
Son altesse royale la duchesse d'Alençon Duchess Sophie Charlotte in Bavaria (1847–1897), no date.

After producing a number of classical and figure paintings at the beginning of his career (e.g. Hériodiade (1880), Le Bon Samaritain (1880), Jésus de Nazareth (1883), Temptation of St. Anthony, Dryade (1884)) he went on to become a society portraitist. Among others he painted Madame Bertinot (1880), Madame Agache (1881), Comtesse de Fontarce (1885), Son Altesse Royale la Duchesse d'Alençon Duchess Sophie Charlotte in Bavaria, Madame Archdeacon-Boisseaux (1895), Madame Méring (1895), Baron Alphonse James de Rothschild (1898), the most famous French socialite of the Belle Epoque Countess Élisabeth Greffulhe, the painter Édouard Detaille (1899), Monsieur Gustave Eiffel (1905), the Duc de Doudeauville, Madame Aymé Darblay (1902), Pastor Goulden (1906), and Frère et Soeur (Brother and sister), which was exhibited at the Salon de Paris in 1911.

== Paintings of animals ==
Morot excelled in portraying animals, which appeared in many of his other paintings, such as the horses in his historic cavalry paintings, a donkey in Le bon Samaritain, a pig in Temptation of Saint Anthony, a snake in La Charmeuse, lions in Lion before his Prey and Reclining Lions, Rex and Au Tableau, tigers in Tigre and Deux Tigres Combattant, dogs in Mademoiselle Brice and Jacques Goldschmid and a cat in the painting of his daughter Denise with Cat (1899).

== International travel ==
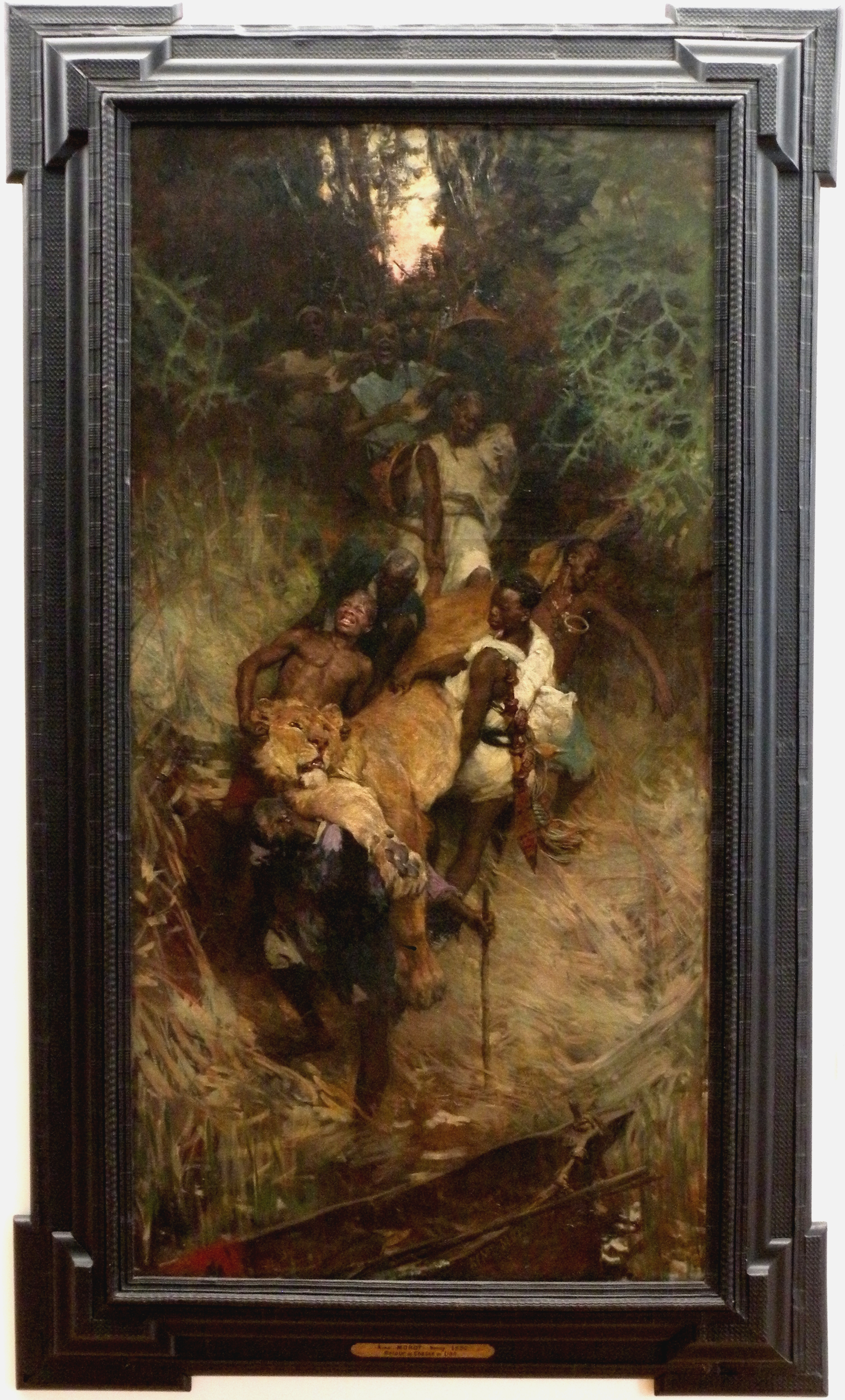
Retour de la Chasse de Lion (Au Tableau), 1902. Musée des beaux-arts de Nancy, France.

His visits to Spain inspired him to Spanish motifs, such as the paintings of Toro Colante displayed at the Salon de Paris in 1885 and of which gravures were published in Le Monde Illustré in 1887 and El Bravo Toro!. which was exhibited in the Salon in 1884 and later featured on the cover of Les Annales politiques et littéraires after his death in 1913. These paintings were painted from memory after Morot had visited a series of bull fights in Spain.

Aimé Morot loved hunting and travelled extensively. In 1889 he travelled to Morocco in the company of the French novelist and naval officer Pierre Loti, where he made several orientalist drawings. In 1893 he went to India for tiger hunting. He also visited Turkey, Syria and Abyssinia (Ethiopia), where he was refused permission to hunt elephants and lions. In 1900 he visited Niger and French Sudan, where he did hunt and kill a large lion. This resulted in Au Tableau (1902), representing the return from the hunt with a killed lion being carried up on a river bank by Africans, which is in the Musée des Beaux-Arts in Nancy. Although he travelled widely, he produced few works in the Orientalism genre. Arabs attacking an English outpost was part of the collection of Salvador de Mendonça until 1892. Morot's Dessert Warrior and the watercolour Fantasia was inspired by his travels to Morocco.

== Media ==
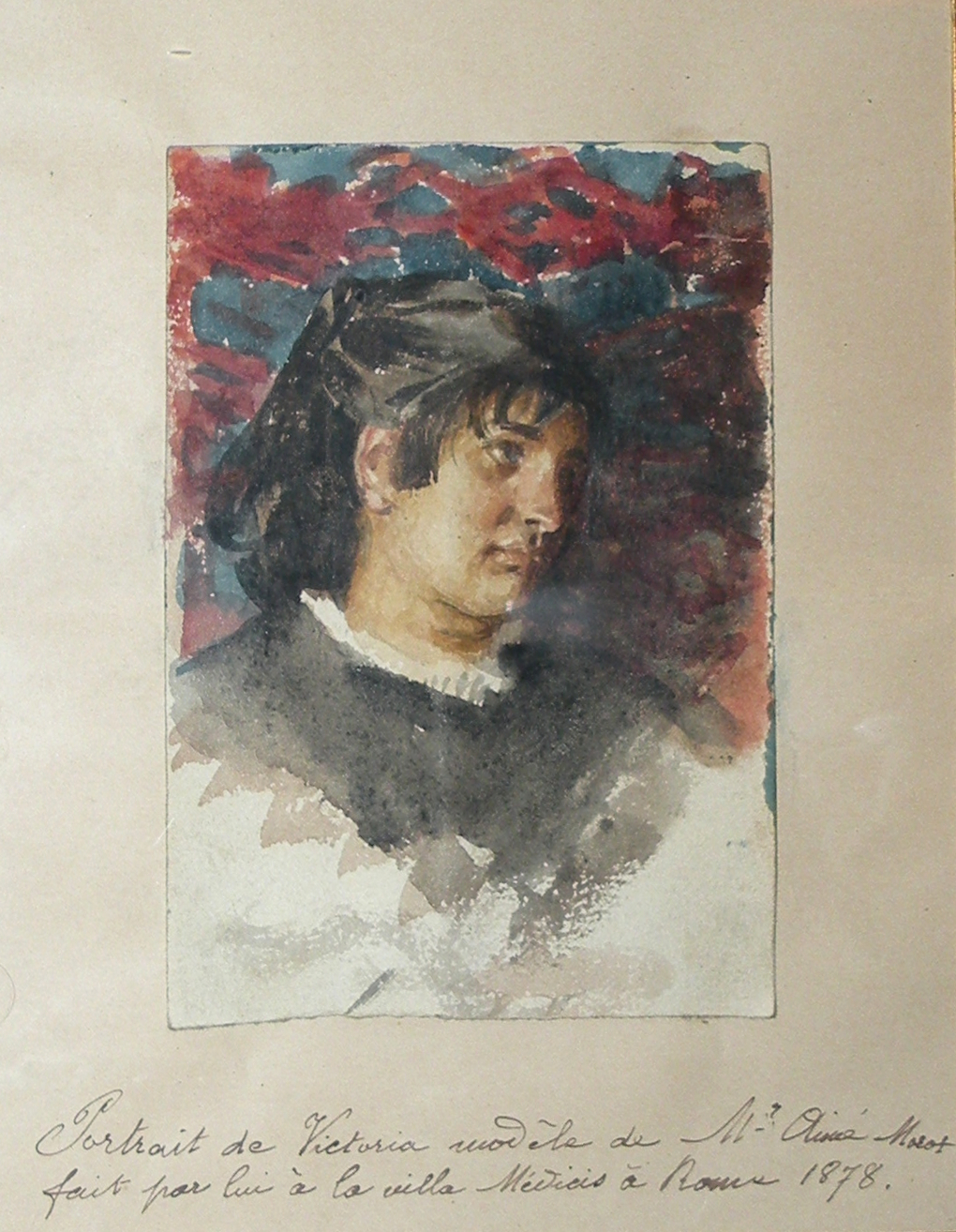
Aimé Nicolas Morot, 1878. Portrait for Victoria, watercolor, Villa Medicis, Rome – Italy.

Most of Morot's work consists of oil paintings, although he used other media. Aimé Morot was a member of the Société d'aquarellistes Français and submitted the watercolour Hallah to their 1888 exhibition in Paris and painted the Battle of Reichshoffen using watercolours. He also painted the ceiling of the Grand Salon of the Hôtel de Ville in Nancy in 1902. Aimé Morot made various sculptures in marble and bronze. In 1905 he worked on a memorial for Jean-Léon Gérôme, which consisted of a group representing Gérôme working on his Gladiator sculpture. This sculpture was exhibited in the Jardin de l'Infante in one of the courts of the Louvre and is now exhibited in the Musée d'Orsay. At the same time he worked on a portrait of fellow painter Ernest Hébert for display at the Salon de Paris and was selected as a jury member for the next Salon in 1906. His sculptures also include a number of Art Nouveau style women's heads carved in white marble similar to those sculpted by Alfred Lenoir (French, 1850–1920), Léon Binet (sculptor) (French, 1880–1952), Enzo Sighieri (Born 1868), Louis Jacques Gallet (Swiss, 1873–1955), Affortunato Gory (Italian, 1895–1925) and G. Verona.

== Colour palette and painting technique ==
For his oil paintings on canvas, Aimé Morot had a preference for a colour palette consisting of silver white, zinc white, yellow ochre, red ochre, cadmium yellow, cadmium red, raw sienna, burnt sienna, cobalt blue, emerald green, rose madder, carmine lake and ivory black. His painting medium consisted of oil mixed with some turpentine or sometimes with copal. He would start his painting by making a rough outline of the entire subject on a well-dried oiled canvas using a brush or charcoal, then applied the paint. When the completed painting had dried for a long time, he finally applied a light varnish.

== Paintings and drawings ==
- Femmes lisant et panthère dans un paysage, 1869. Oil on canvas, 0.65 x 0.54 m.
- Jésus parmi les Docteurs (Jesus among the doctors), 1871. Oil on canvas, 32 x 47 cm. Students' work at academy: Sketch for the grand prize of painting.
- Une Scène de Déluge, 1872. Musée des beaux-arts de Nancy (in storage), France.
- Super Flumina Babylonis (La captivité des Juifs à Babylone), 1873. Oil on canvas, 1.45 x 1.13 m, École nationale supérieure des Beaux-Arts, Paris.
- Daphnis et Chloé, exhibited at the Salon de Paris in 1873.
- Portrait of J.S. Guilloire, contrôleur en chef de la Comédie-Française, 1874. Oil on wood panel, 0.272 x 0.22 m. Carnavalet Museum, (Musée Carnavalet, Histoire de Paris, Paris). France.
- Portrait of Jules Laroche (1841–1925), sociétaire de la Comédie-Française, 1881. Oil on wood panel, 0.27 x 0.215 m. Carnavalet Museum, (Musée Carnavalet, Histoire de Paris, Paris). France.
- Médée, 1876. Oil on canvas, 232 x 160 cm. exhibited at the Salon de Paris in 1877. Musée Barrois, Bar-le-Duc, France.
- Mlle M. d'Épinay, exhibited at the Salon de Paris in 1877.
- Victoria, 1878. Water colour portrait on paper, 0.12 x 0.09 m. Private collection M.J. Waterloo, Amsterdam – The Netherlands.
- The Good Samaritan, study, 1878. Oil on canvas, 0.56 x 0.38 m. Exhibited in the Salon of the Société des Artistes Français in 1880. Petit Palais, Musée des Beaux-Arts de la Ville de Paris, France.
- Les Ambronnes (Ambrones), 1879. Épisode de la bataille d'Eaux-Sextienne. Exhibited in the Salon of the Société des Artistes Français in 1879. Musée des beaux-arts de Nancy (in storage), France.
- Herodiade, 1880.
- Descente de croix (Descent from the cross), no date. Oil on canvas, 0.82 x 0.59 m, signed Aimé Morot lower left.
- Portrait of a lady, no date. Charcoal drawing on paper, 0.185 x 0.145 m. Signed in the lower left corner.
- Le Forgeron, no date. Oil on canvas, 42.2 x 33.8 cm. Musée des beaux-arts, Reims, France.
- The good Samaritan, 1880. Oil on canvas, 2.69 x 1.98 m, Petit Palais, Musée des Beaux-Arts de la Ville de Paris, France.
- Monsieur Barthelemy Crepy, 1880. Oil on canvas, 1.02 x 0.80 m, Musée des beaux-arts, Lille, France.
- Portrait of Madame Agache, 1880. Oil on canvas. Exhibited in the Salon of the Société des Artistes Français in 1882.
- Temptation of Saint Anthony. Oil on Canvas. Exhibited in the Salon of the Société des Artistes Français in 1881.
- Portrait of Mademoiselle M. Agache, 1881. Oil on canvas. Exhibited in the Salon of the Société des Artistes Français in 1881.
- Portrait of Madame Julia Bartet (1854–1941), sociétaire de la Comédie-Française, 1881. 0.28 x 0.23 m. Carnavalet Museum, (Musée Carnavalet, Histoire de Paris, Paris), France.
- Portrait of Mme W. H.. Exhibited in the Salon of the Société des Artistes Français in 1882.
- The death of Mazepa's horse, 1882.
- Portrait of Mademoiselle Dudlay (1858–1934), 1883. Oil on wood panel, 0.275 x 0.224 m. Sociétaire de la Comédie-Française, Carnavalet Museum, (Musée Carnavalet, Histoire de Paris, Paris), France.
- Martyrdom of Jesus of Nazareth, 1883. Oil on canvas, 3.50 x 2.50 m. Exhibited in the Salon des Artistes Français in 1883. Musée des beaux-arts de Nancy (in storage), France.
- Self portrait of A-N. Morot, 1883. Drawing published in de Bélina, 1883.
- Dryade, 1884. Exhibited in the Salon of the Société des Artistes Français in 1884. The wreath of flowers in the frame was modelled by a sculptor who was a friend of the artist. Sold at auction in New York in 1892, from the collection of Mr. Salvador de Mendonca, Brazilian Minister at Washington
- El Bravo, Toro, 1884. Exhibited in the Salon of the Société des Artistes Français in 1884.
- Toro Colante, no date. Exhibited in the Salon of the Société des Artistes Français in 1885.
- Monsieur Jules Claretie administrateur de la Comédie-Française (1840–1913), no date – between 1880 and 1890. Oil on wood panel, 0.35 x 0.24 m, Carnavalet Museum (Musée Carnavalet, Paris), France.
- Portrait de Monsieur Victor Hugo, 1885. Oil on canvas, 1.10 x 0.88 m. Maison de Victor Hugo (Hauteville House), Guernesy, France.
- Portrait of Comtesse de Fontarce, 1885.
- Portrait de Louis-Eugène Garraud (1831–1893), sociétaire de la Comédie-Française, 1885. Oil on wood panel, diameter 0.28 m. Carnavalet Museum, (Musée Carnavalet, Histoire de Paris, Paris), France.
- Comte de Gironde, no date. Oil on canvas, 1.46 x 0.92 m, Musée Ingres, Montauban, France.
- Jeune Juive, no date. Etude, oil on wood panel, 0.27 x 0.22 m. Private collection M.J. Waterloo, Amsterdam – The Netherlands.
- Rezonville, Musée d'Orsay, Paris, France.
- Reichshoffen, 6 August 1870, 1887. Oil on canvas, 4.30 x 8.00 m. Exhibited in the Salon des Artistes Français in 1887. Palace of Versailles, Musée de l'Histoire de France (Versailles), France.
- Une fantasia, Water color, no date. Listed in the 1888 catalogue of the Société d'aquarellistes Français.
- Gitane, Oil on wood panel, no date. Musée des Beaux-Arts de Nancy.
- Monsieur Henri Schneider, no date. Oil on canvas, 130 x 96 cm. Ecomusée Creusot Montceau, Montceau, France.
- Portrait de Madame la Baronne G.C. de B.. Exhibited in the Salon of the Société des Artistes Français in 1888.
- Madame Aline Leon, 1887, Musée des beaux-arts de Nancy (in storage), France.
- Hallali, 1888. Watercolor. Exposed at the Salon des Aquarellistes Français in Paris, 1888.
- Passage de l'oued M'Cazen, 1889
- Le passage de un Gué, no date.
- La fantasia, 1889.
- Le charmeur de serpants, no date.
- Le Sultan de Maroc dans la cour des Ambassadeurs, no date.
- Les terasses de Fez, à l'heure du Moghreb, no date.
- Algerian guard. 0.20 x 0.24 m. Sold at auction in New York from the collection of Mr. J Abner Harper.
- Arabs Attacking an English Outpost; Episode of the war in Egypt. Oil on canvas, 0,74 x 0.92 m. Sold at auction in New York in 1892, from the collection of Mr. Salvador de Mendonca, Brazilian Minister at Washington.
- Prisonnier, no date. Oil on canvas, 1.10 x 1.28 m, Musée des beaux-arts, Lille, France.
- Portrait of M. Paternote, 1889. Mr. Patenotre was the minister of France in Morocco and was painted posing in a palace in Fes.
- Rixe dans un intérieur, no date. Oil on canvas, 0.46 x 0.55 m. Morot also made a watercolour painting of the same scene.
- Portrait of Mademoiselle M. Gérôme. Portrait of the wife of Mr. Morot on horseback, exhibited at the Salon of the Société des Artistes Français in 1890, photograph published in L'Illustration magazine and in Enault (1890)
- Les danses Françaises à travers les âges (Plafond destiné a l'Hôtel de Ville, Paris), 1892. Exhibited in the Salon of the Société des Artistes Français in 1892.
- Le reveil de Minet, photograph published in Gil Blas in 1894.
- Fleur d'automne, 1892. Water colour on paper.
- Retraite de Saint-Jean-d'Acre (Prairial An VII). Exhibited in the Salon of the Société des Artistes Français in 1893.
- Portrait of Monsieur Eugénidi, 1895.
- Portrait of Madame Archdeacon-Boisseaux, 1895.
- Portrait of Monsieur Bernard, no date. Exhibited in the Salon of the Société des Artistes Français in 1895.
- Portrait of Mademoiselle M. Gérôme, 1895.
- Portrait of Prince A. d'Arenberg, 1897. Exhibited at the Salon of the Société des Artistes Français in 1898.
- Portrait of Monsieur Jean-Léon Gérôme, 1897.
- Portrait of Le duc de la Rochefoucauld-Doudeauville, 1897. Exhibited at the Salon de Paris, 1898.
- Portrait of Comte de la Rochette, 1898.
- Portrait of Madame Depret, 1898.
- Homme Drapé, no date. Signed pencil drawing sketch on paper for Jean-Léon Gérôme, 0.29 x 0.22 m.
- Portrait of Monsieur Chevalier, 1899.
- Portrait of Monsieur Édouard Detaille, 1899. Oil on canvas, 1.50 x 0.90 m, Palace of Versailles, Musée de l'Histoire de France (Versailles), France.
- Portrait of Comte de Fontenay, 1900.
- Portrait de Monsieur Edouard Dumont (architect). Exhibited at the Salon of the Société des Artistes Français in 1900.
- Portrait of Josephine Prouvost, no date. Oil on canvas.
- Portrait of Monsieur Louis Stern, 1900. Oil on canvas.
- Portrait of Comte Creuzé de Besser, 1900.
- Portrait of Madame A. C.... Exhibited at the Salon of the Société des Artistes Français in 1901.
- Portrait of Monsieur P. D.... Exhibited at the Salon of the Société des Artistes Français in 1901.
- Portrait of Monsieur Cronier, 1901.
- Portrait of Madame A. D.... Exhibited at the Salon of the Société des Artistes Français in 1902.
- Retour de la chasse au lion (Au Tableau), 1902. Oil on canvas. Exhibited at the Salon of the Société des Artistes Français in 1902. Musée des beaux-arts de Nancy, France.
- Portrait of Monsieur Jacques Goldschmid, 1903.
- Portrait of Monsieur Denormandie, 1903.
- Portrait of Madame Aimé Morot et sa fille, 1904. Exhibited at the Salon of the Société des Artistes Français in 1904.
- Portrait of Madame Aymé Darblay, 1904. Oil on canvas.
- Portrait of Mademoiselle Janine Desmarais, 1904. Oil on canvas, 0.83 x 0.60 m.
- Portrait of Monsieur Gustave Eiffel, 1905. Oil on canvas, 1.41 x 0.99 m, Palace of Versailles, Musée de l'Histoire de France (Versailles) France.
- Portrait of Ernest Hébert, 1905. Oil on canvas, 1.24 x 0.95 m. Exhibited at the Salon of the Société des Artistes Français in 1905. Palace of Versailles, Musée de l'Histoire de France (Versailles), France.
- Rex. Exhibited at the Salon of the Société des Artistes Français in 1907. Published as postcard at the salon.
- Portrait of Monsieur Eugène Goüin. Exhibited at the Salon of the Société des Artistes Français in 1909.
- Portrait of a girl, 1909. Oil on canvas 0.40 x 0.32 m. Private collection M.J. Waterloo, Amsterdam – The Netherlands.
- Portrait of Baron Edmond de Rothschild. Exhibited at the Salon of the Société des Artistes Français in 1910.
- Frère et Soeur, 1911. Displayed on the cover of the April 1911 edition of L'illustration
- Souvenir du Maroc (Fantasia), no date. Exhibited at the Salon of the Société des Artistes Français in 1911. Published in the April 1911 edition of L'illustration.
- Portrait of M. Limantour. Exhibited at the Salon of the Société des Artistes Français in 1912.
- Ephemère printemps (Les deux psychés). Exhibited at the Salon of the Société des Artistes Français in 1912.
- Portrait of Monsieur Paul Deschanel, no date. Exhibited in the Salon of the Société des Artistes Français in 1913. This was the last painting exhibited by Aimé Morot at the Salon just before his death in August 1913.

== Bronze and marble sculptures ==
- Gérôme sculpting the Gladiators, Monument to Gérôme, Musée d'Orsay, Paris (sculpted by Jean-Léon Gérôme and Aimé Morot)
- Head bust of Richard Wagner. White marble on stand, signed, height 42 cm.
- Woman's torso. No date. Bronze, signed.
- Baigneuse, no date. Bronze, signed, foundry mark C. Valsuani on base. height 45 cm.
- Head of elegant woman, no date. Sculpted in high-relief against chiseled background in white marble, signed, height 42 cm. Private collection Amsterdam, the Netherlands.
- Head of young lady, no date. Sculpted in high-relief against chiseled background in white marble, signed, height 12 cm. Private collection Amsterdam, the Netherlands.
- Buste of Jean-Léon Gérôme, about 1909. Bronze. Musée Georges-Garret, Vesoul.
- Vénus au bain, no date. Bronze on green marble base, signed, height 22 cm. Private collection, Amsterdam, the Netherlands.
- Head of young lady, no date. Sculpted in high-relief against chiseled background in Carrara marble, signed, height 20 cm. Private collection Amsterdam.
- Buste de jeune femme (Buste of a young lady), no date. White Carrara marble on stand, signed, height 27 cm.
- Head of young lady with eyes closed, no date. Sculpted in high-relief against chiseled background in Carrara marble, signed Morot, height 19 cm. Private collection, Amsterdam, the Netherlands.
- Paysanne, no date. Alabaster sculpture of young farmer girl, signed Morot. Height 35 cm. Private collection Amsterdam, the Netherlands.

== Art gallery ==
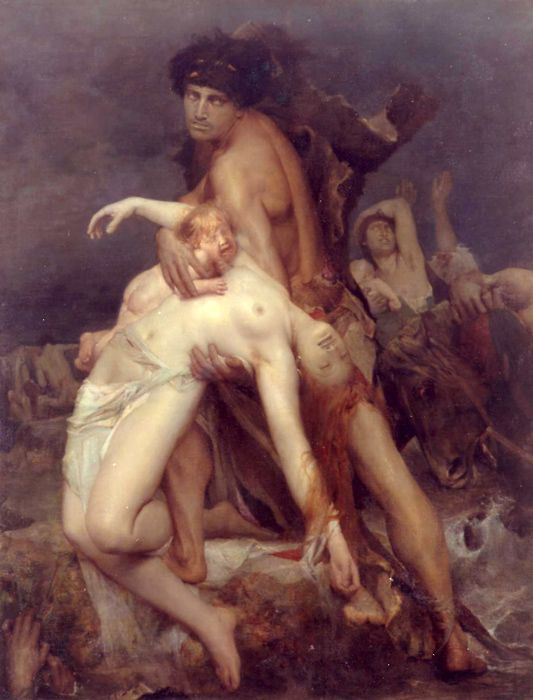
Une Scène du déluge, 1872. Musée des beaux-arts de Nancy, France.

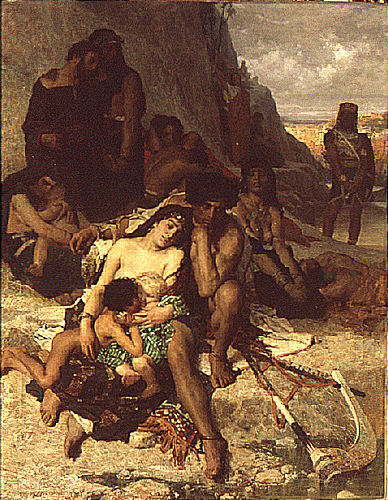
Super Flumina Babylonis, 1873. Prix de Rome painting.

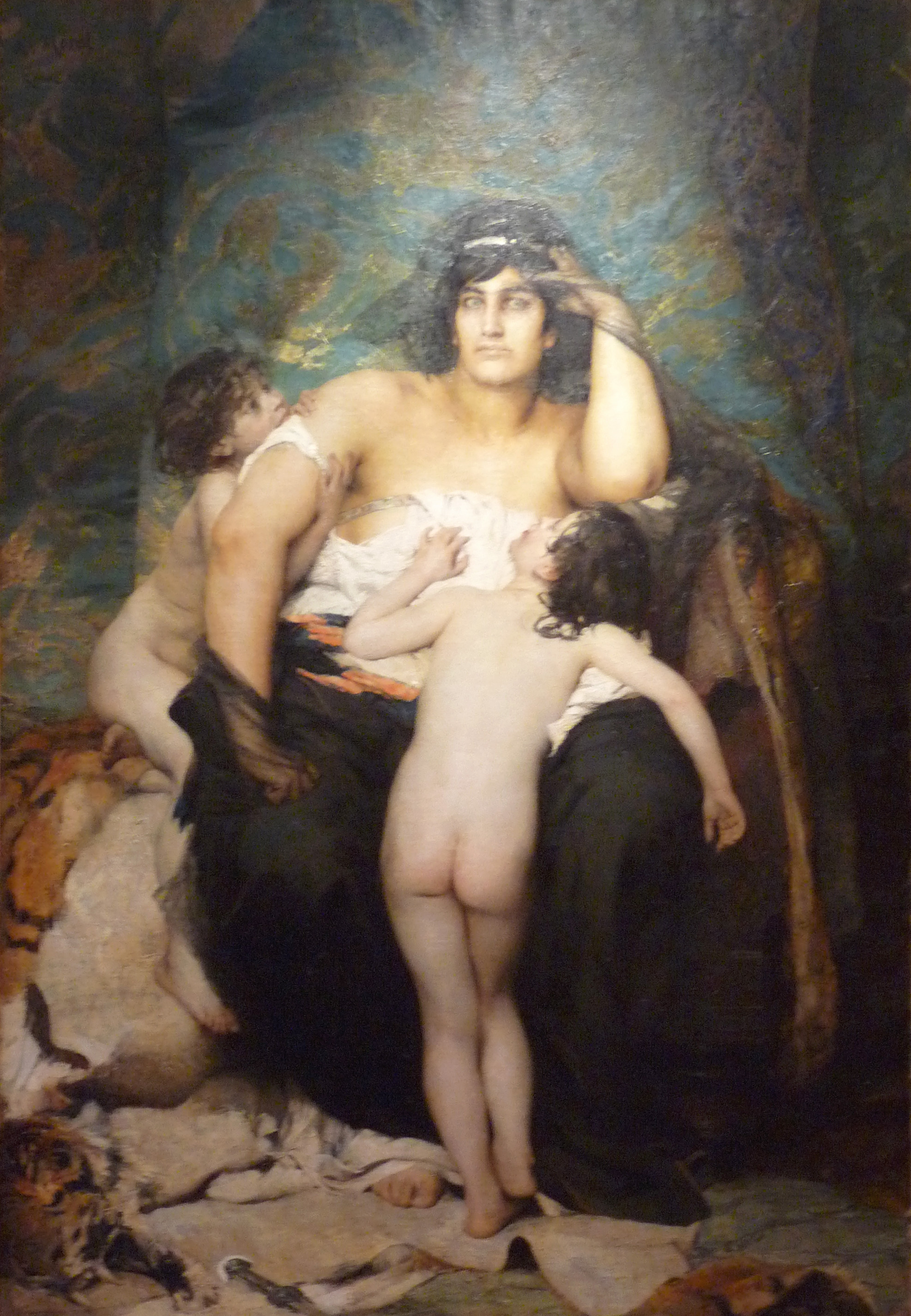
Médée, 1876, Musée Barrois, Bar-le-Duc, France. Second class medal award at Salon.

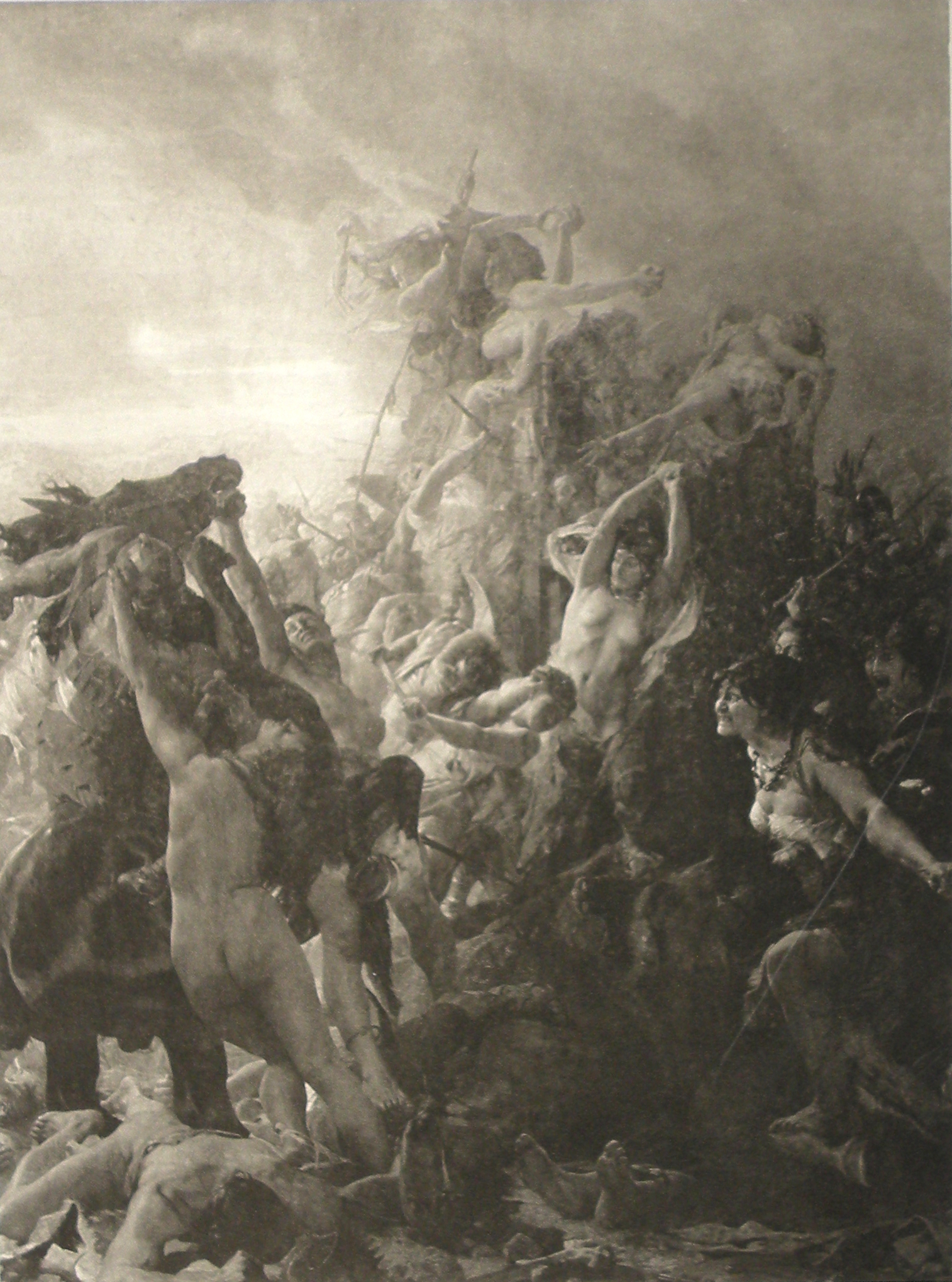
Les Ambronnes (Ambrones), 1879. Musée des Beaux-Arts de Nancy, France. First class medal awarded at Salon.

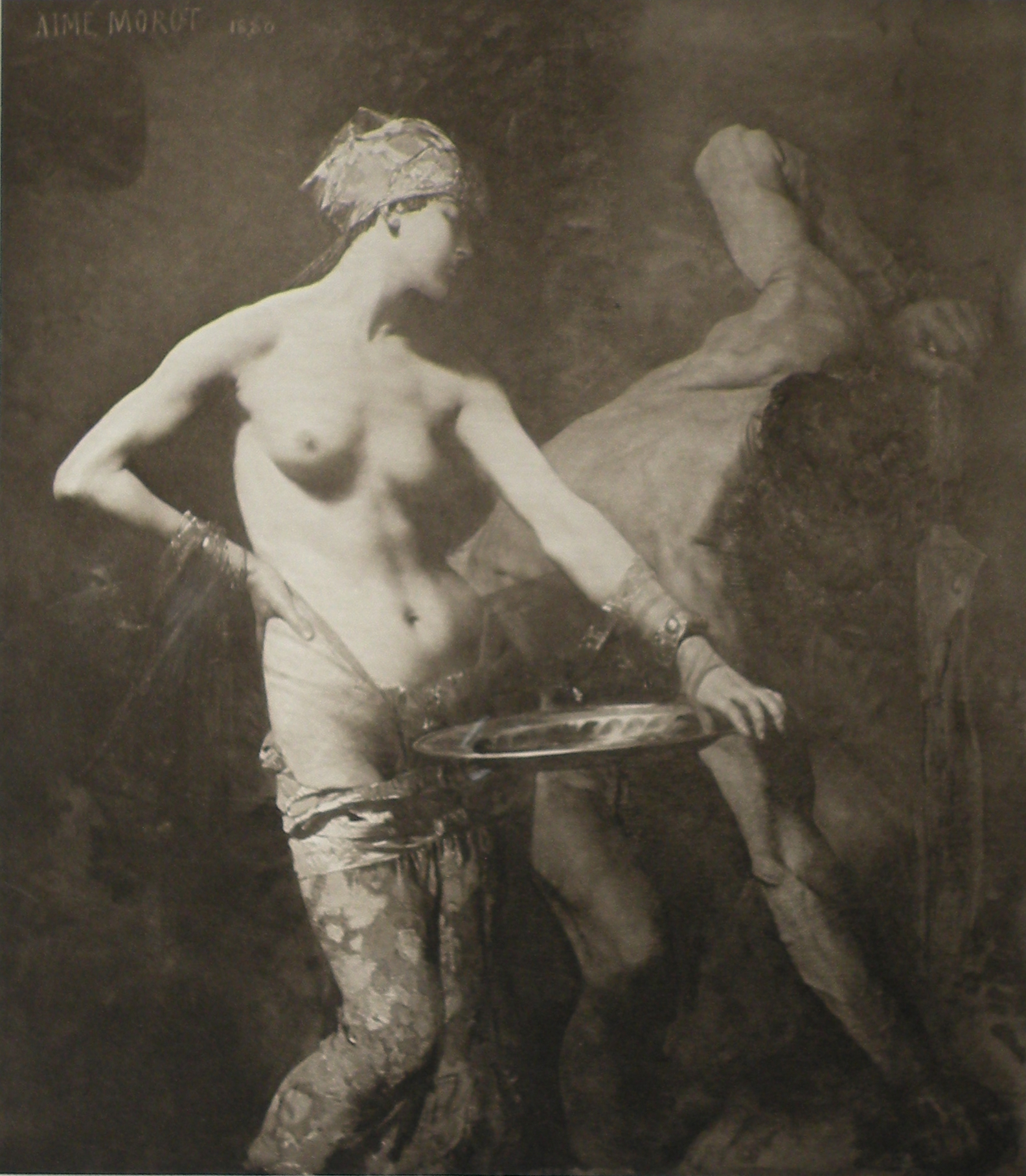
Hérodiade (Herodias), 1880.

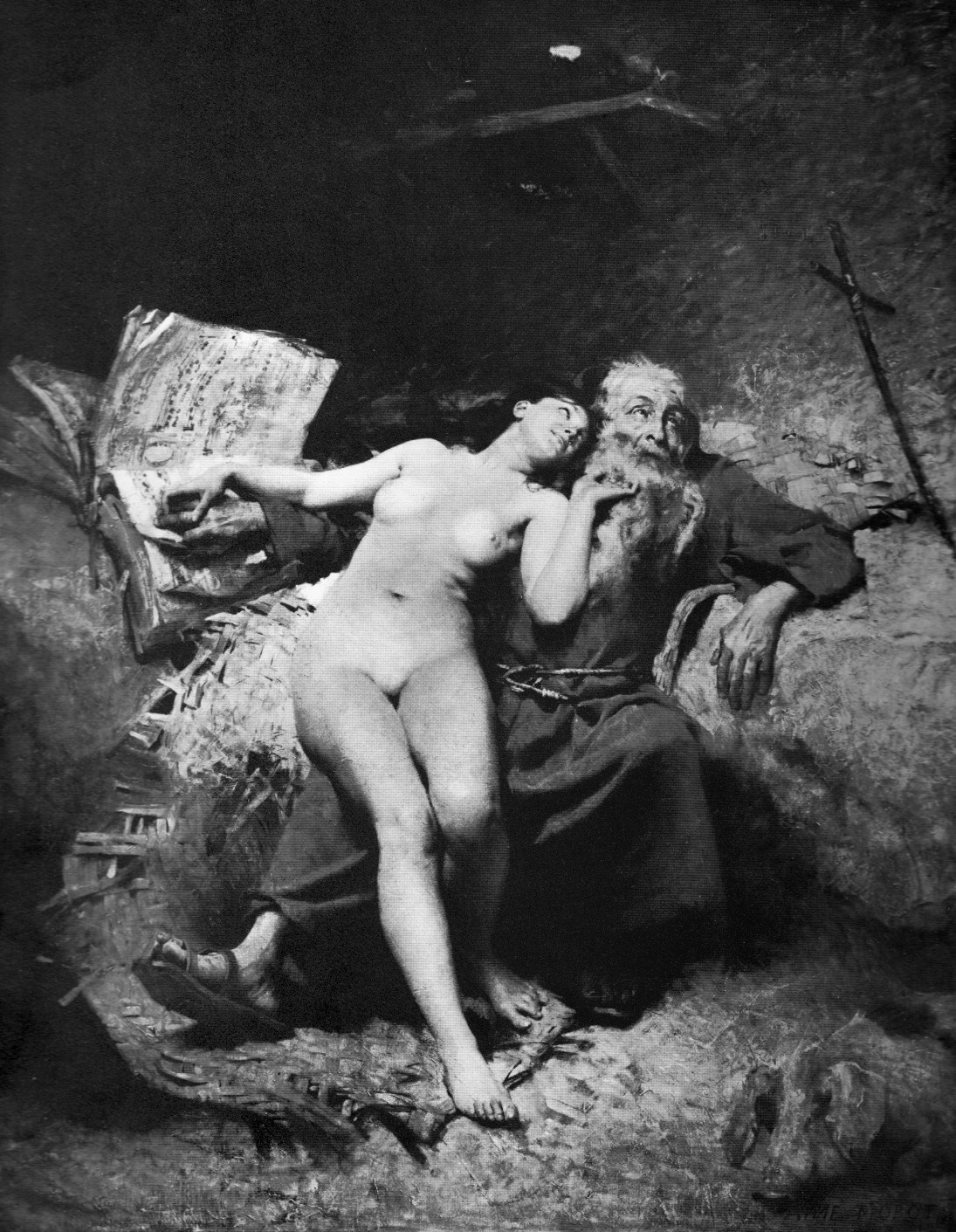
Temptation of Saint Anthony, exhibited at the Salon de Paris, 1881.

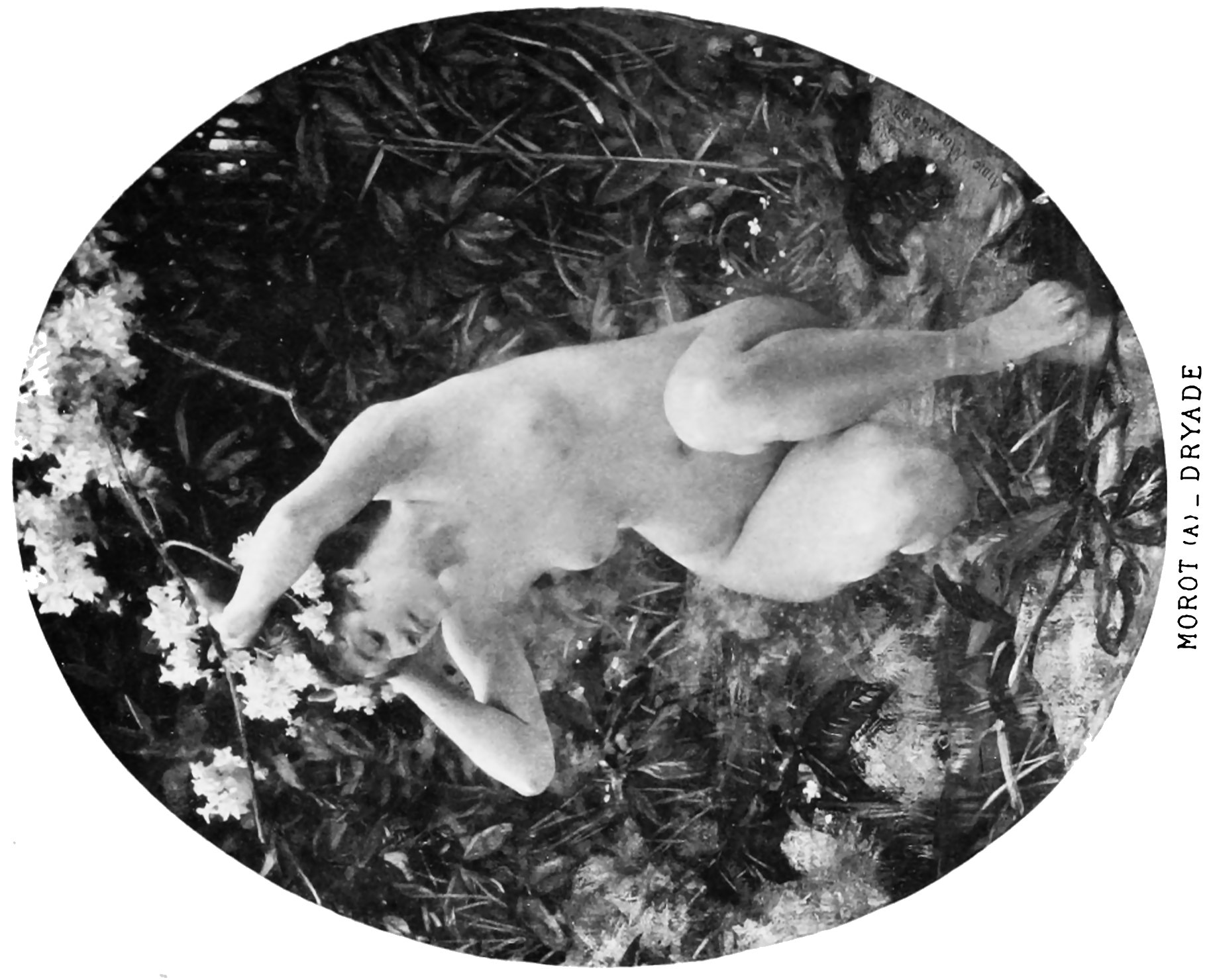
Dryade, 1884.

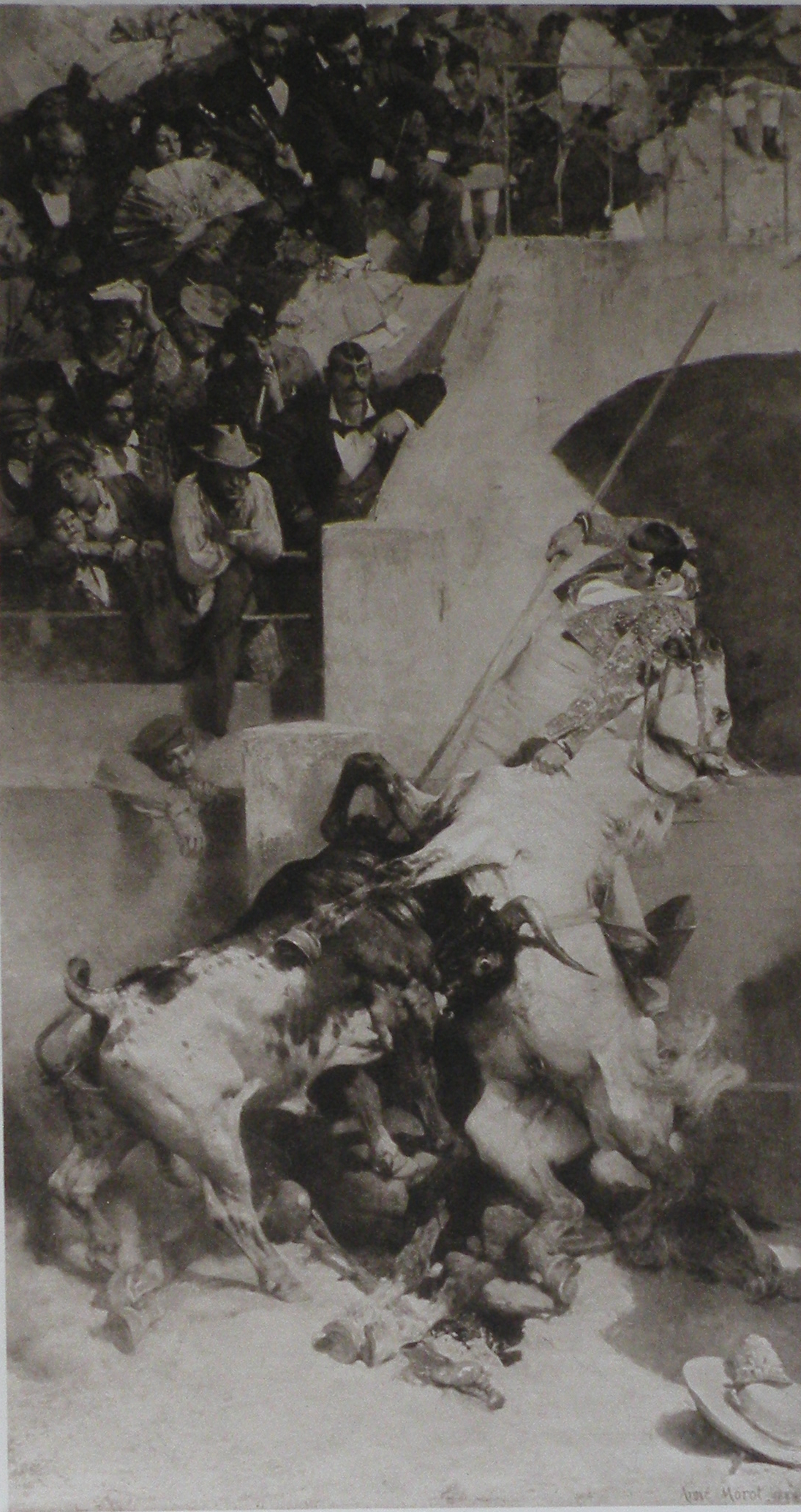
El bravo toro, 1884.

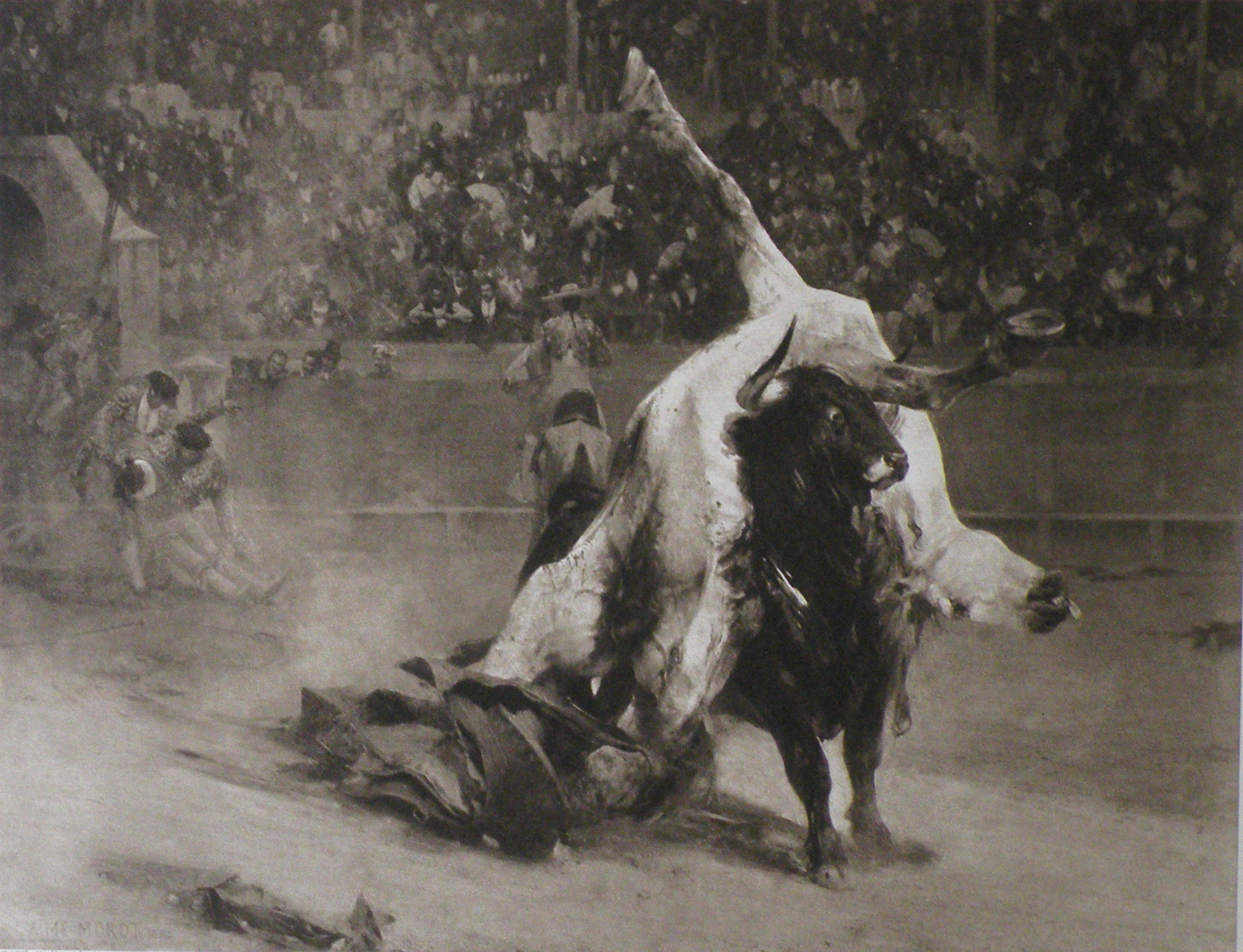
Toro colante, no date. Exposed in 1885.

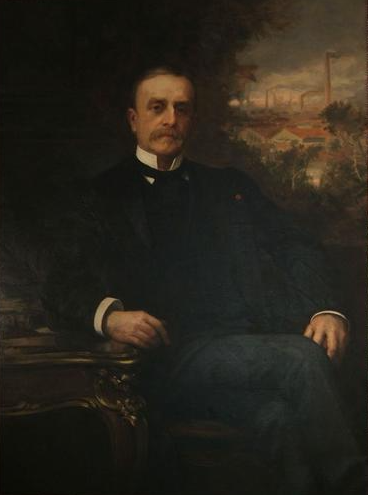
Monsieur Henri Schneider.

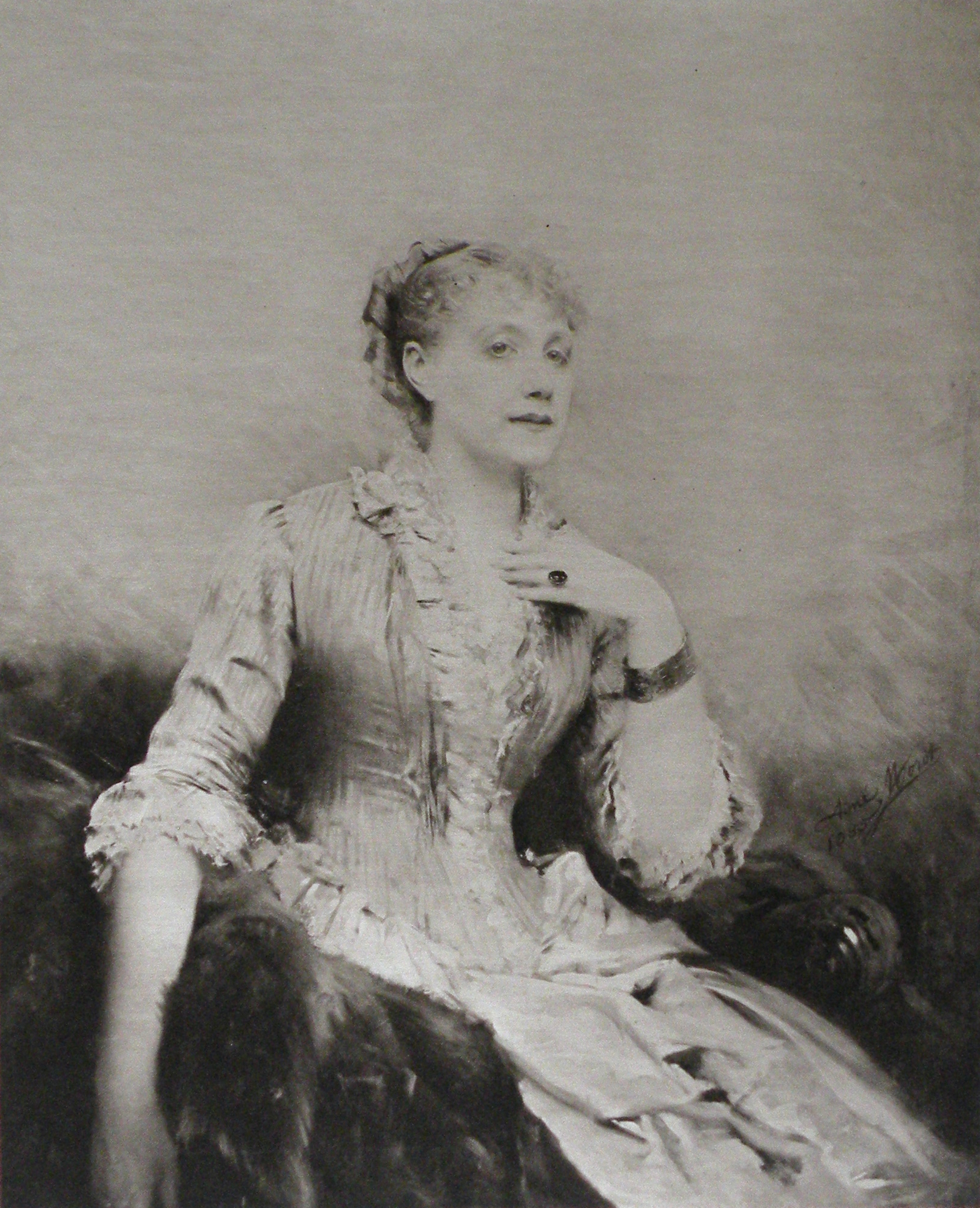
Comtesse de Fontarce, 1885.

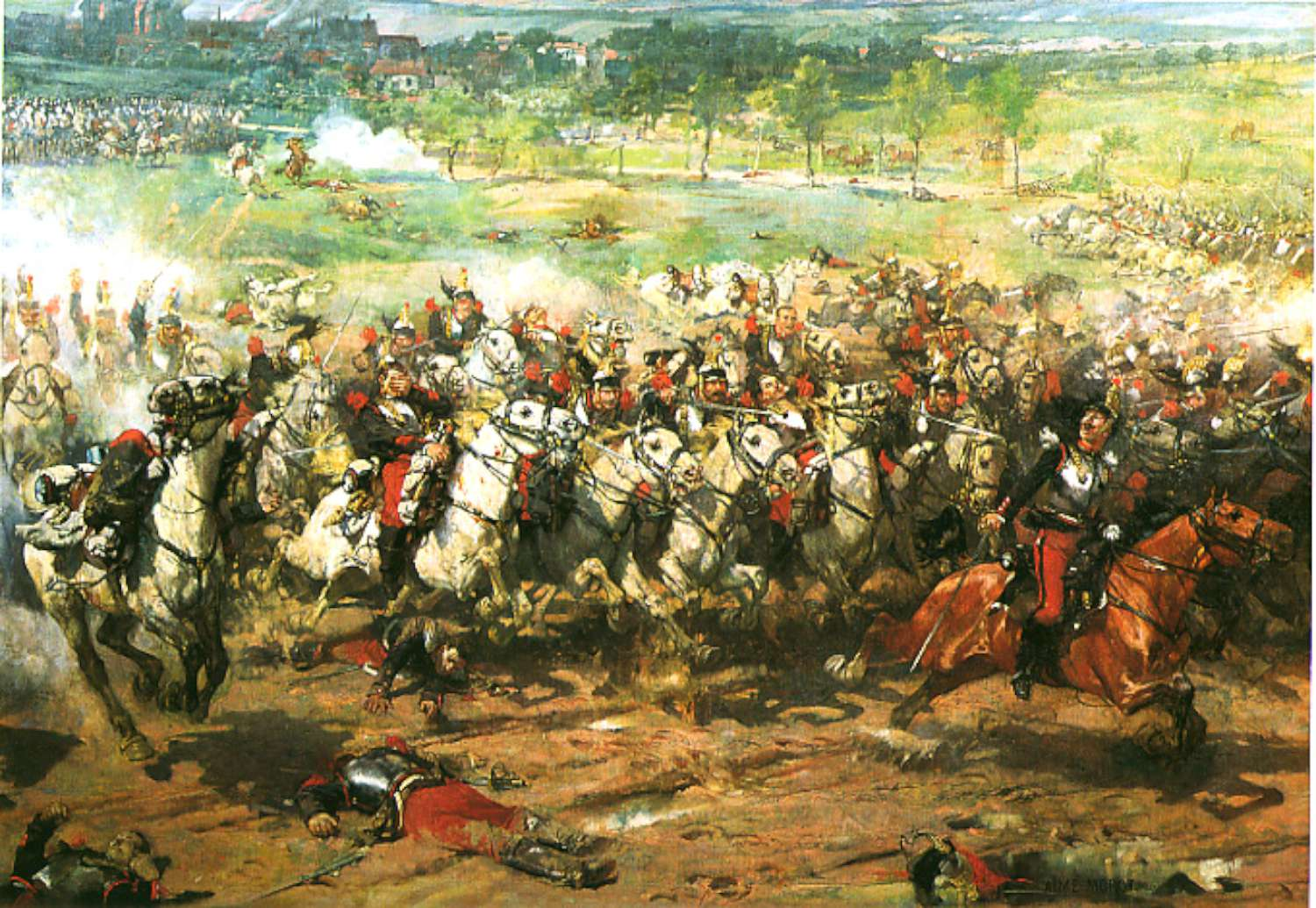
3^{ème} Cuirassiers a Helsass Hausen, 1887. Watercolor of the 1870 Franco-Prussian battle, Musée du château de Versailles, France.

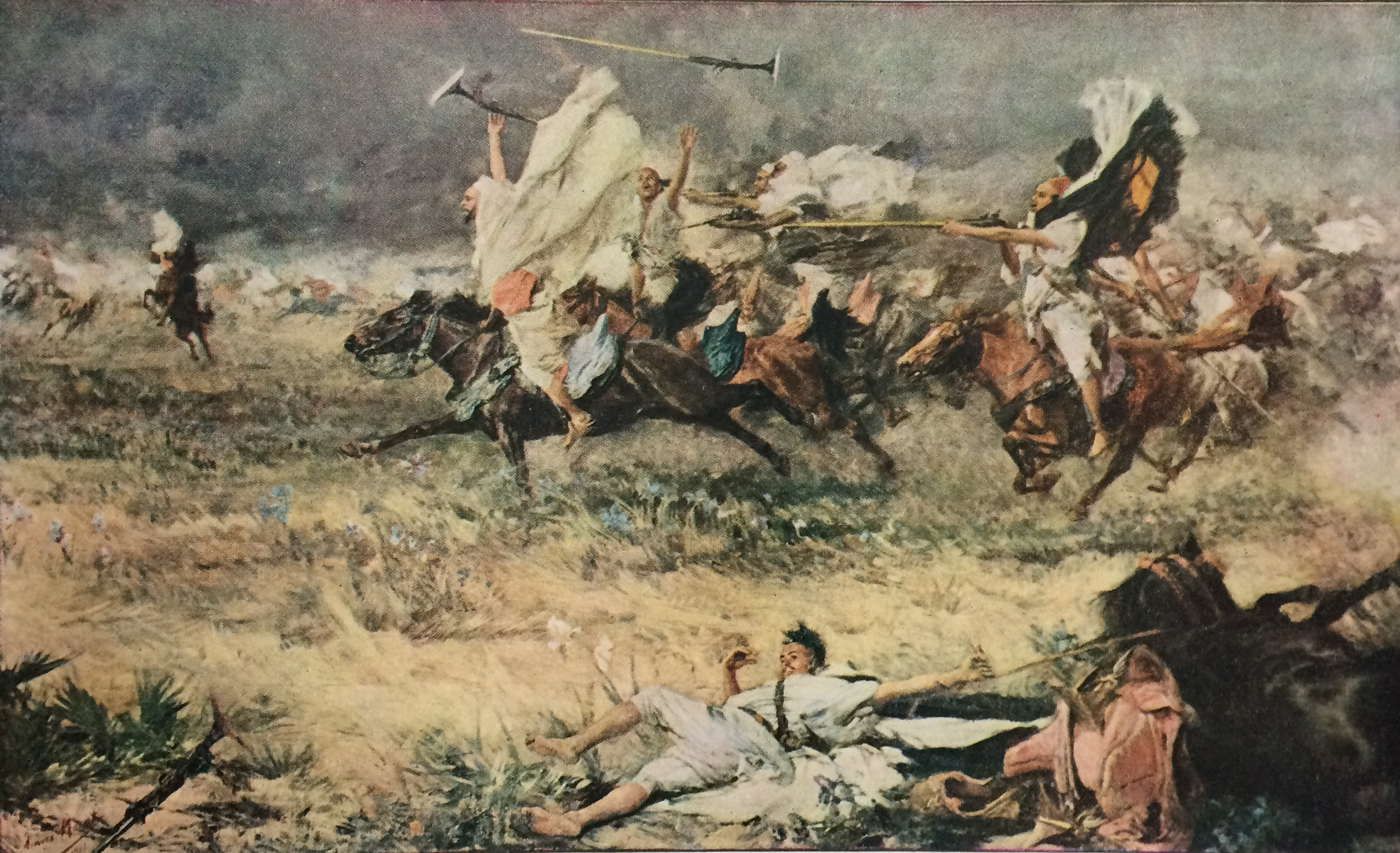
Souvenir du Maroc (Fantasia) Exhibited in the 1911 Salon des Artistes Français.

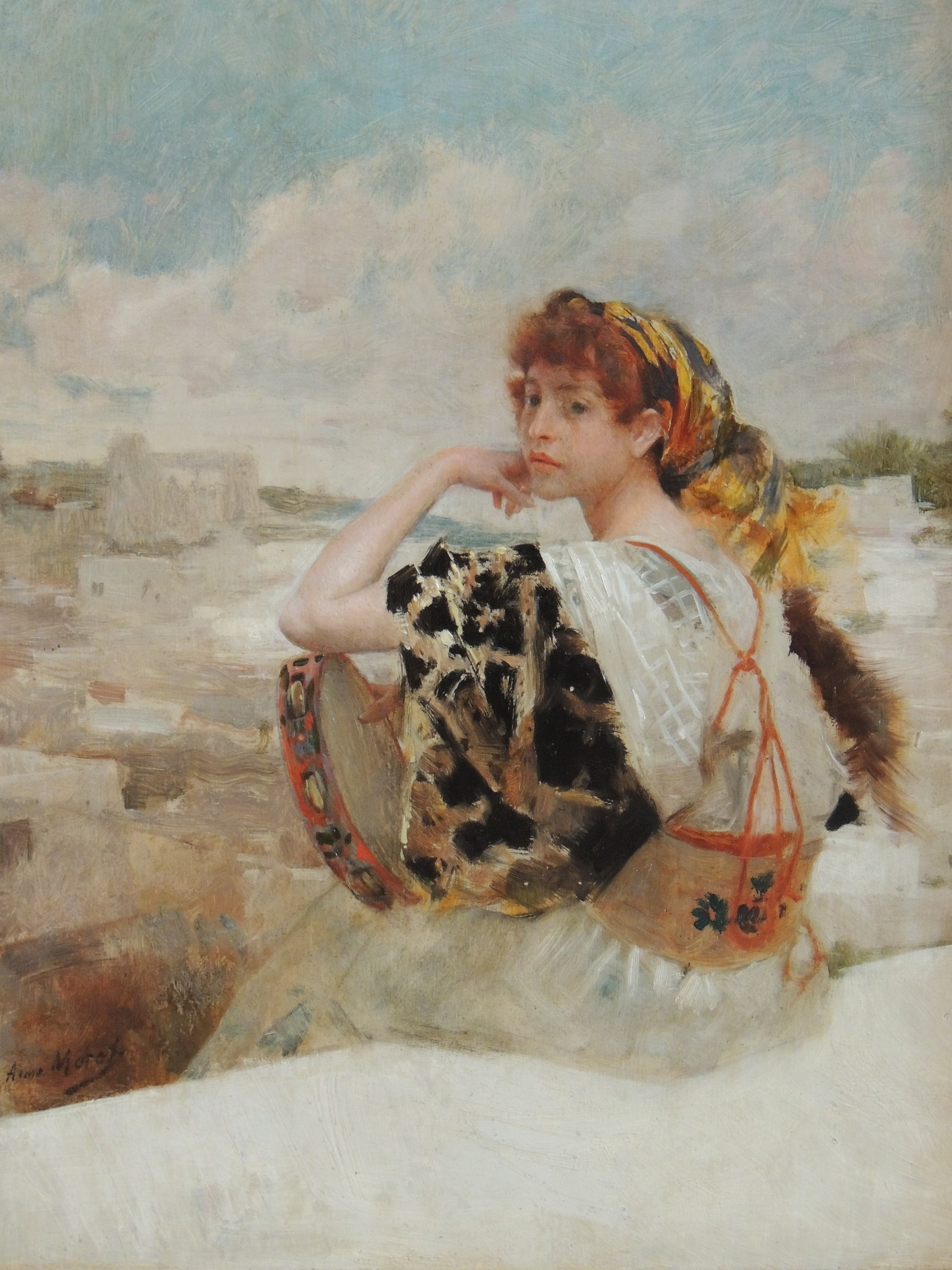
Gitane, no date. Musée des Beaux-Arts de Nancy.

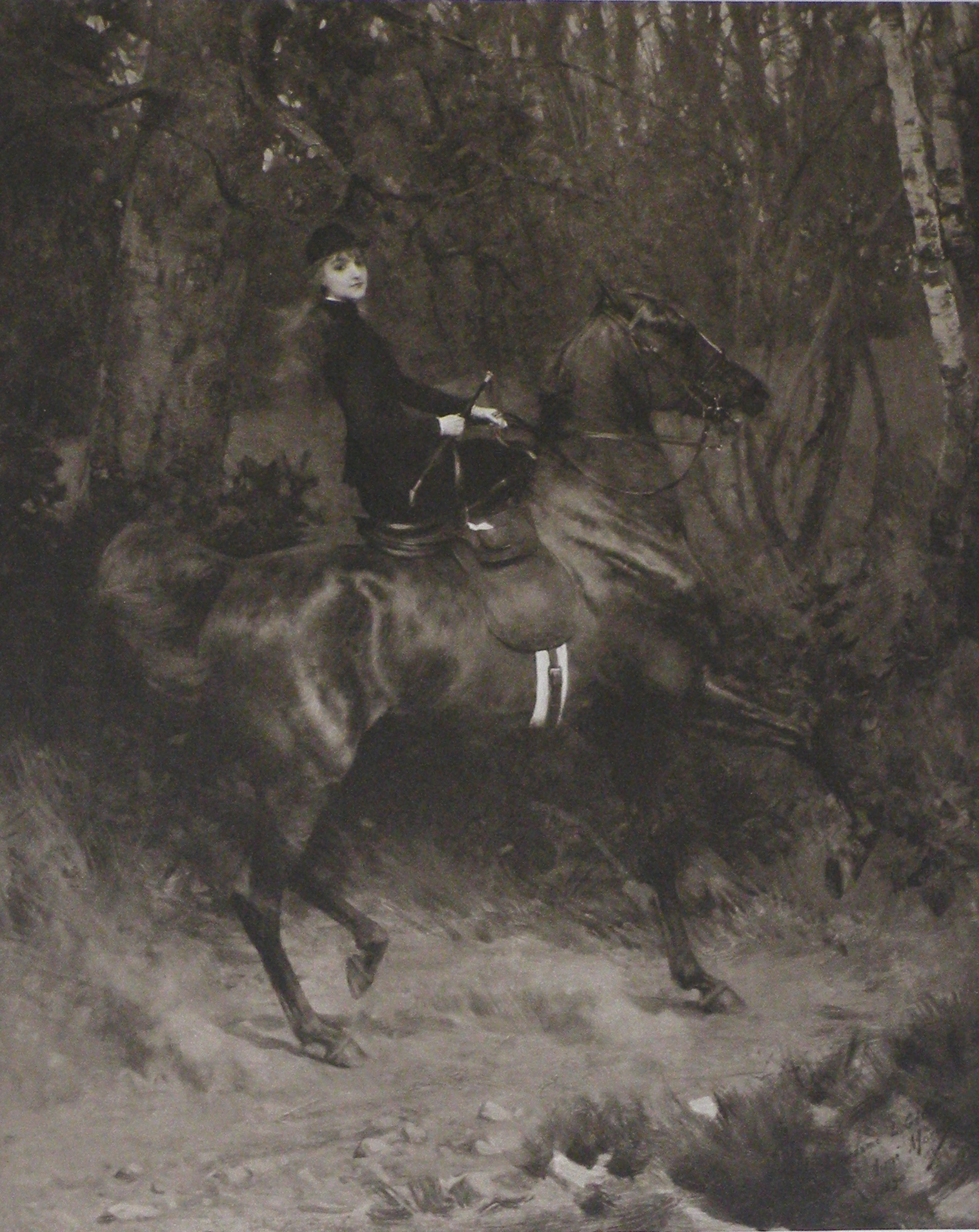
Mademoiselle Madeleine Gérôme, 1890.

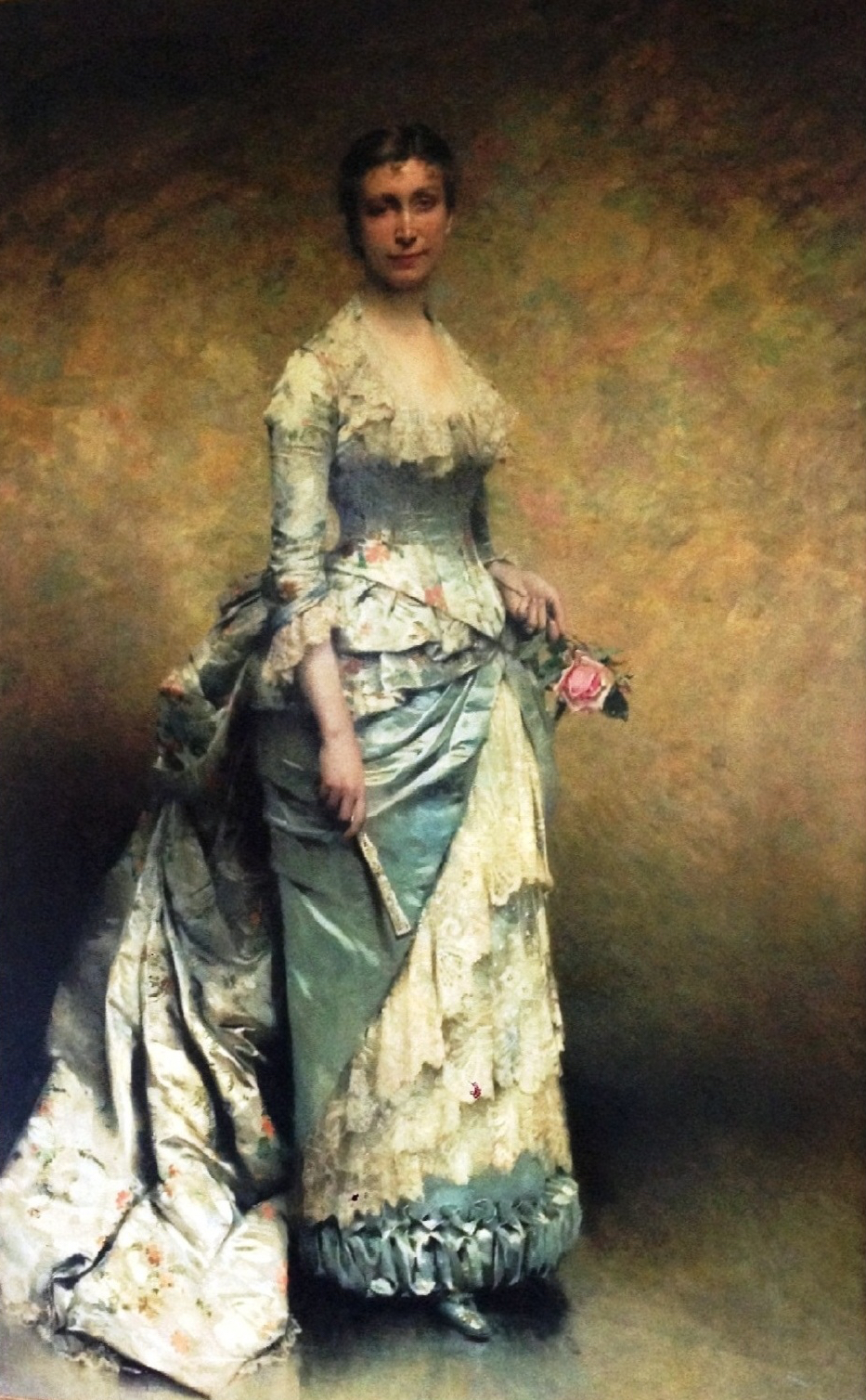
Madame Josephine Prouvost.

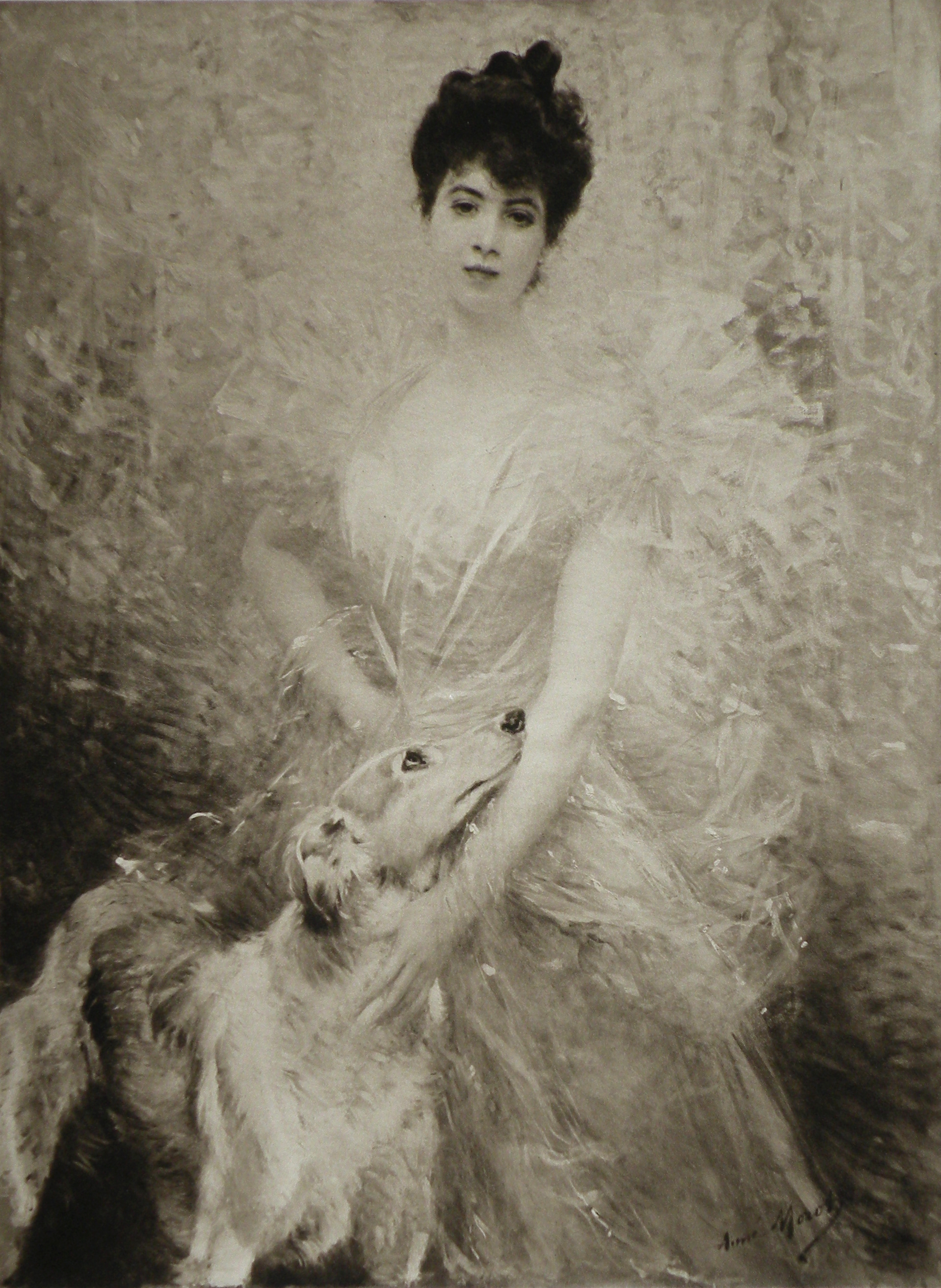
Mademoiselle René Brice, no date. Exposed at l'Épatant in 1898.

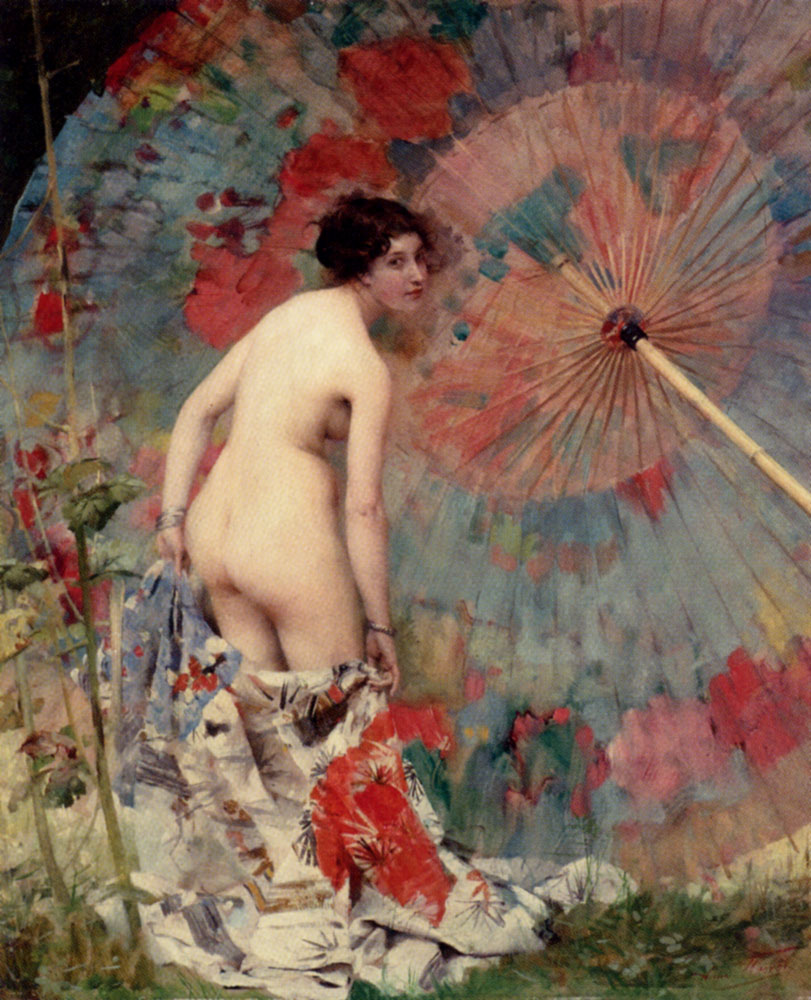
Etude de femme au bain, no date.

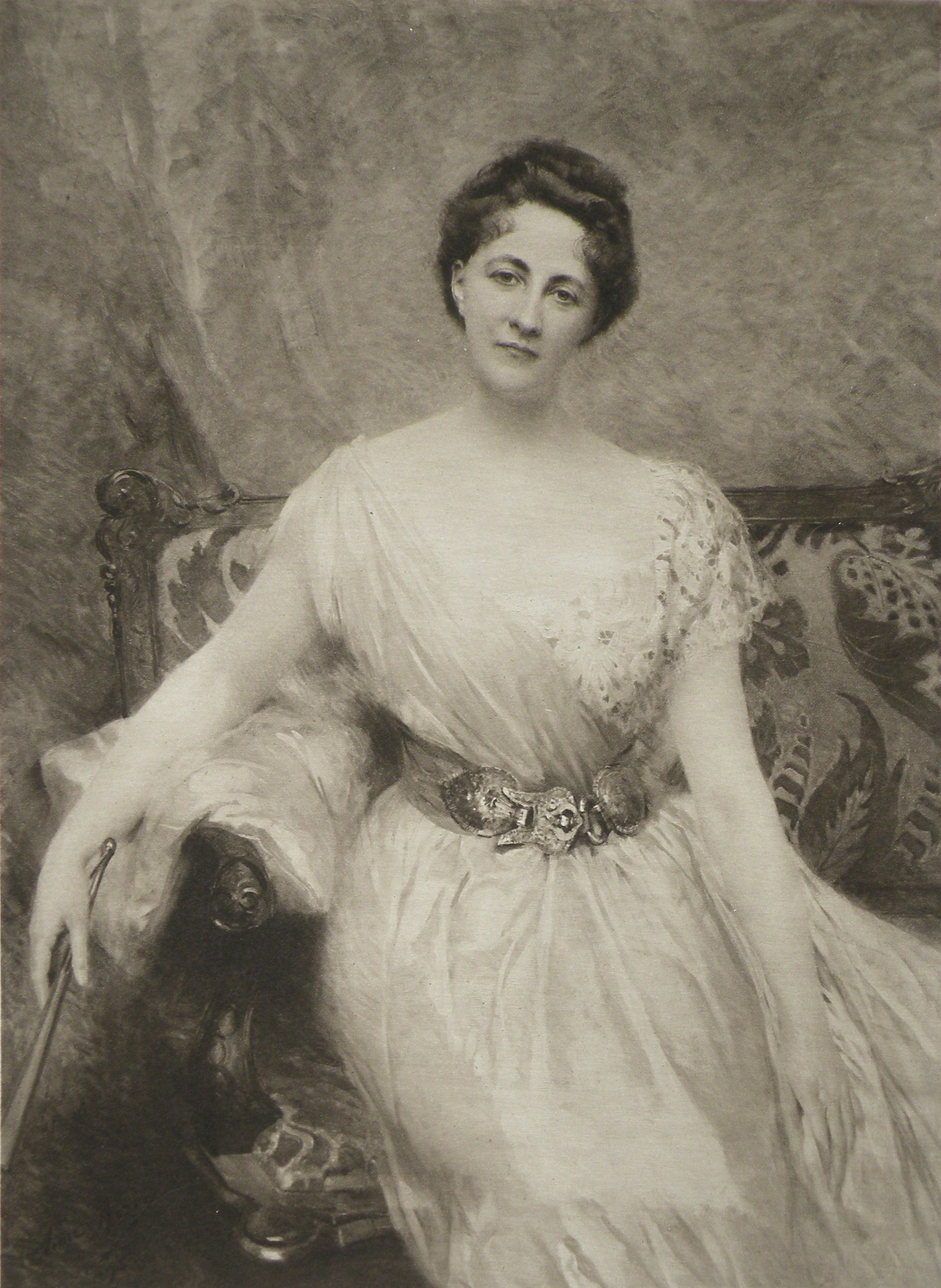
Madame Archdeacon-Boisseaux, 1895.

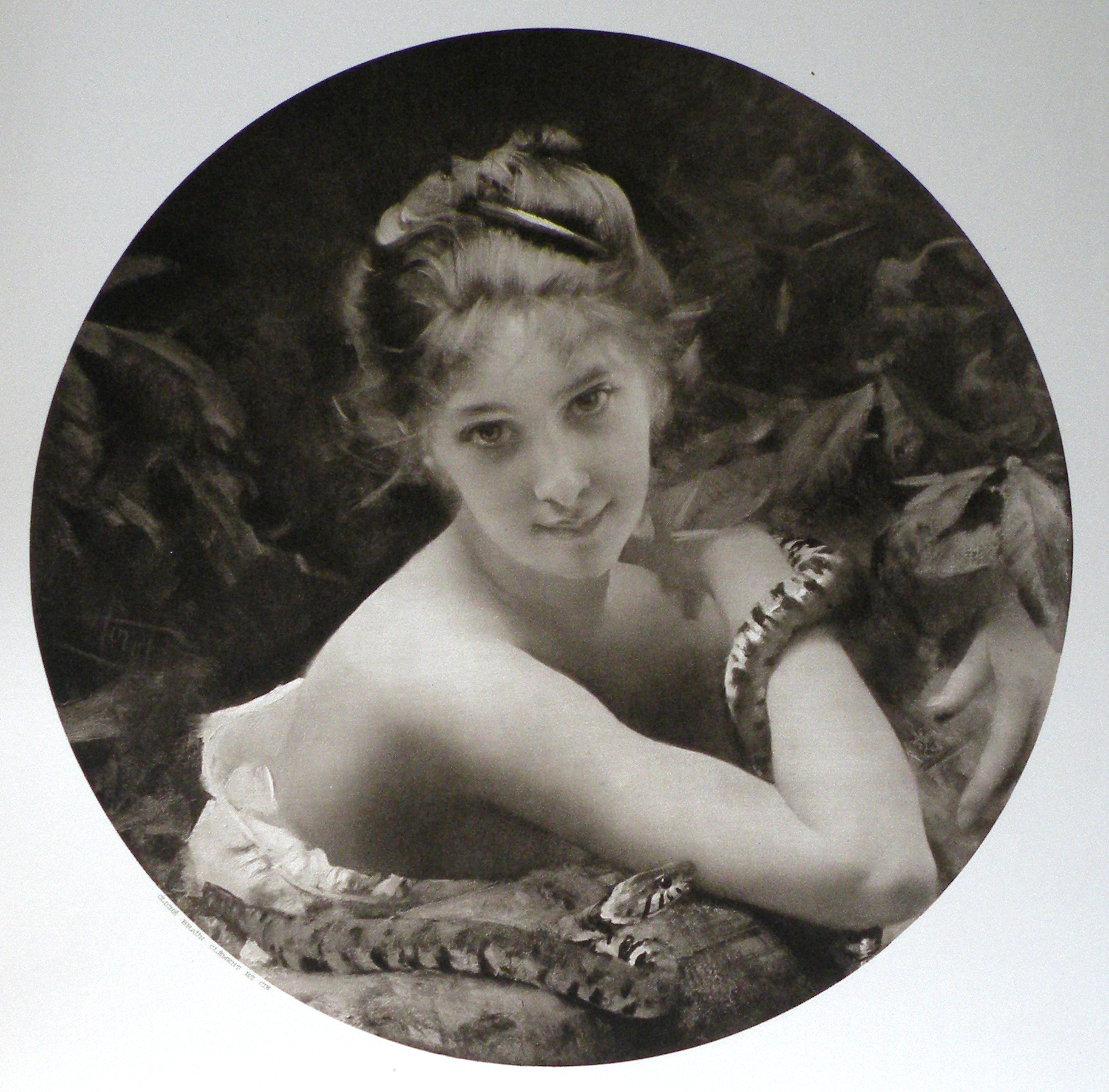
Charmeuse, no date.

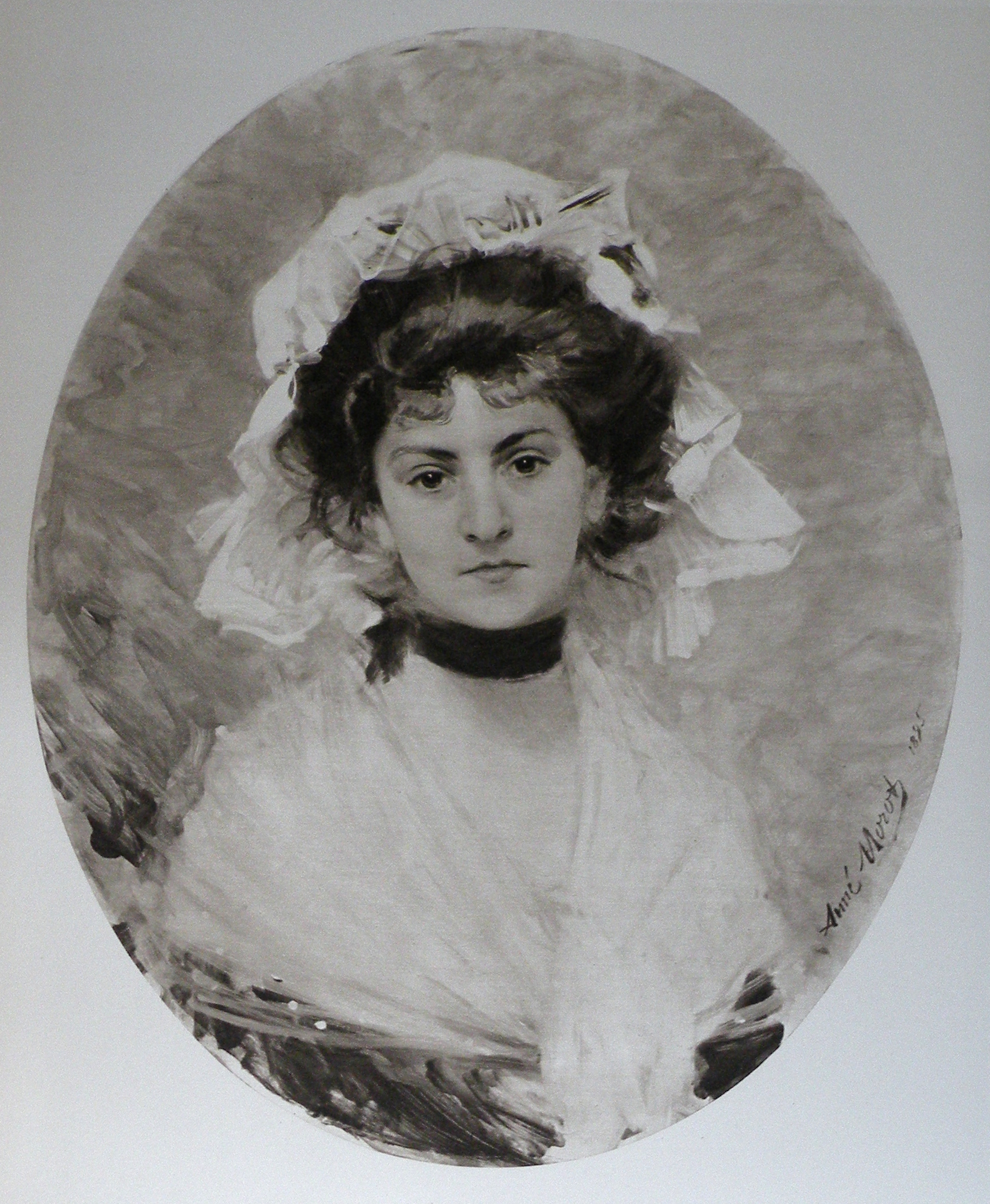
Portrait of Mademoiselle M. Gérôme, 1895.

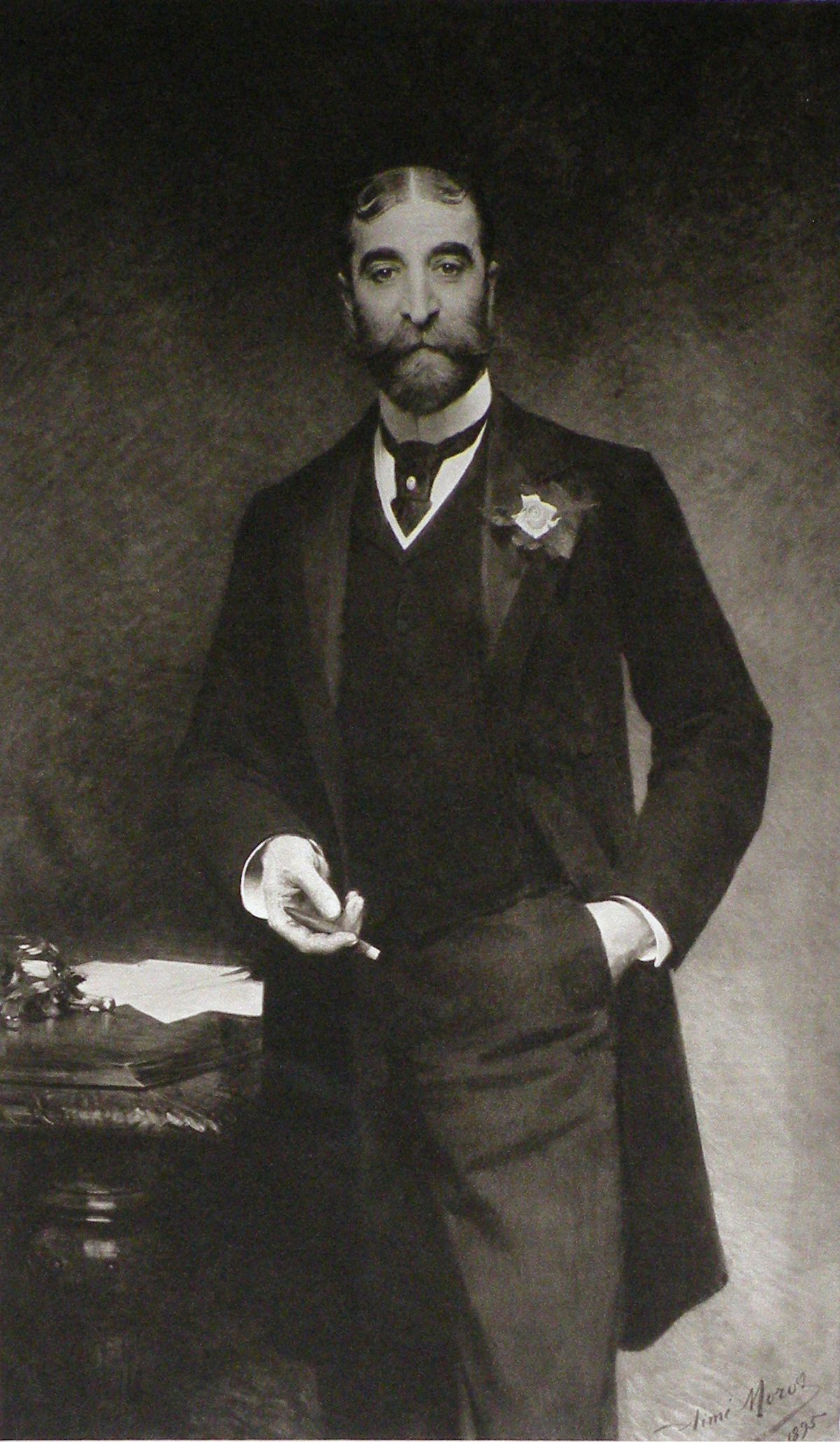
Monsieur Eugénidi, 1895.

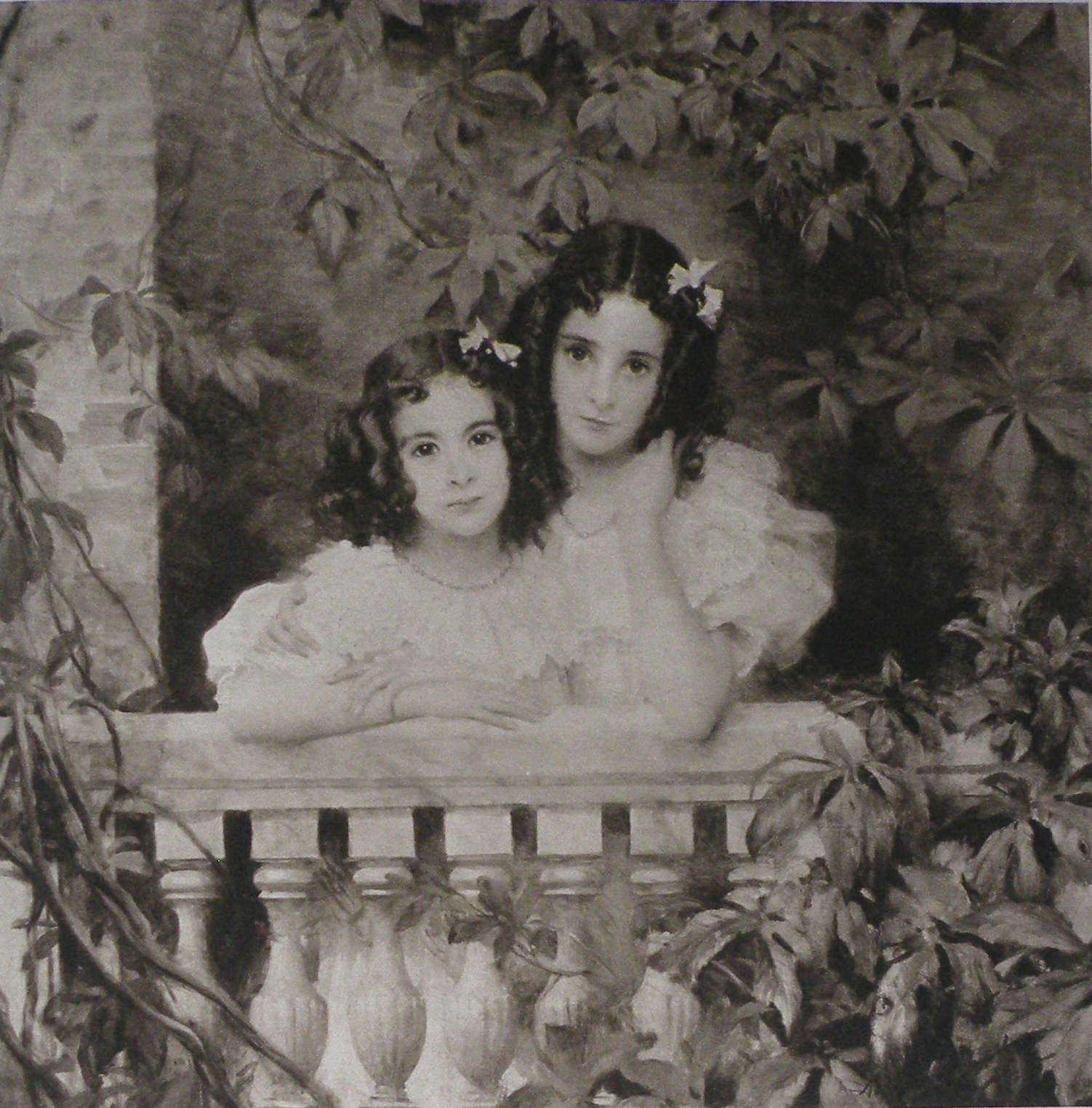
Mesdemoiselles Eugénidi, no date.

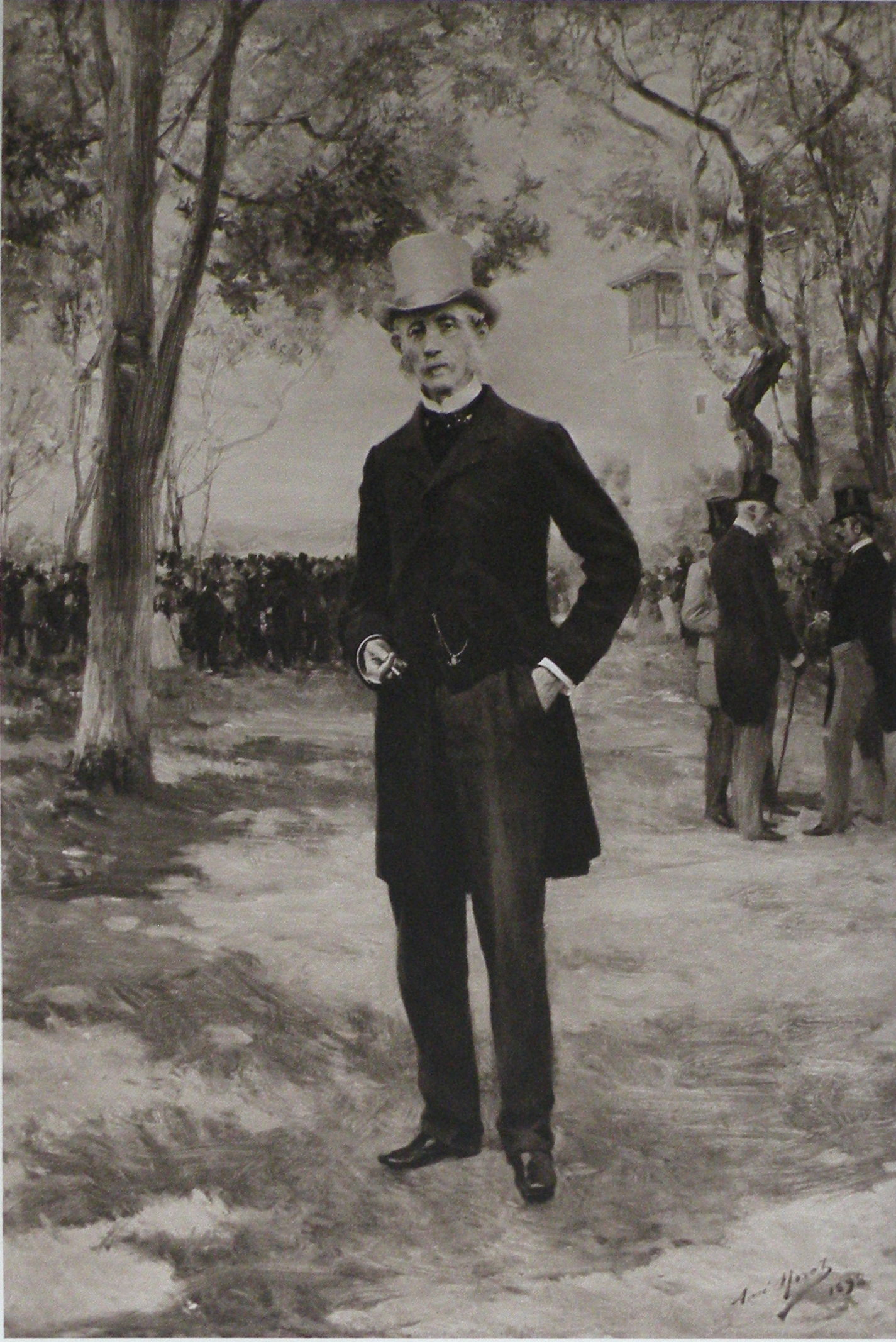
Comte de la Rochette, 1898.

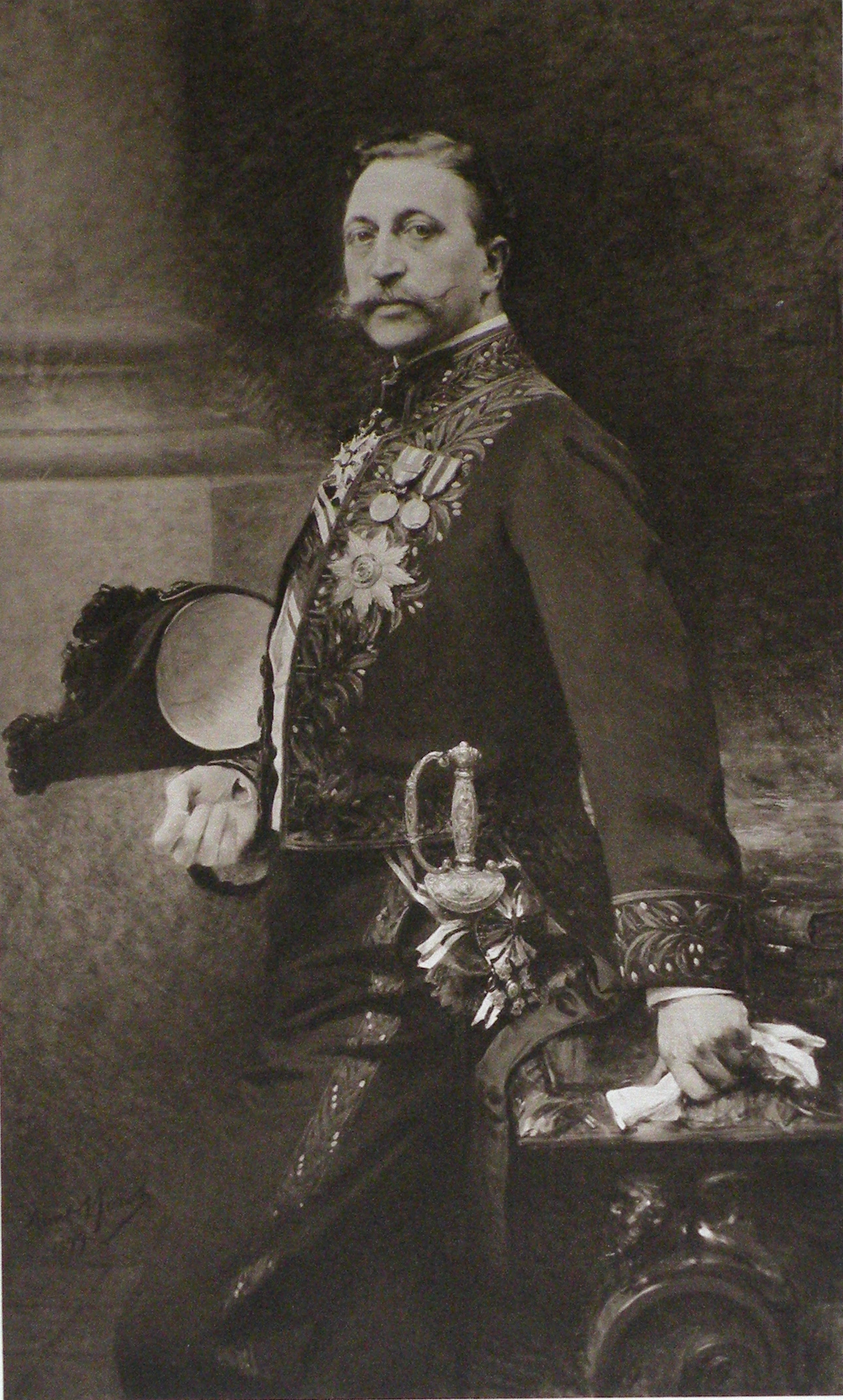
Portrait of Mr. Edouard Detaille (painter), 1899.

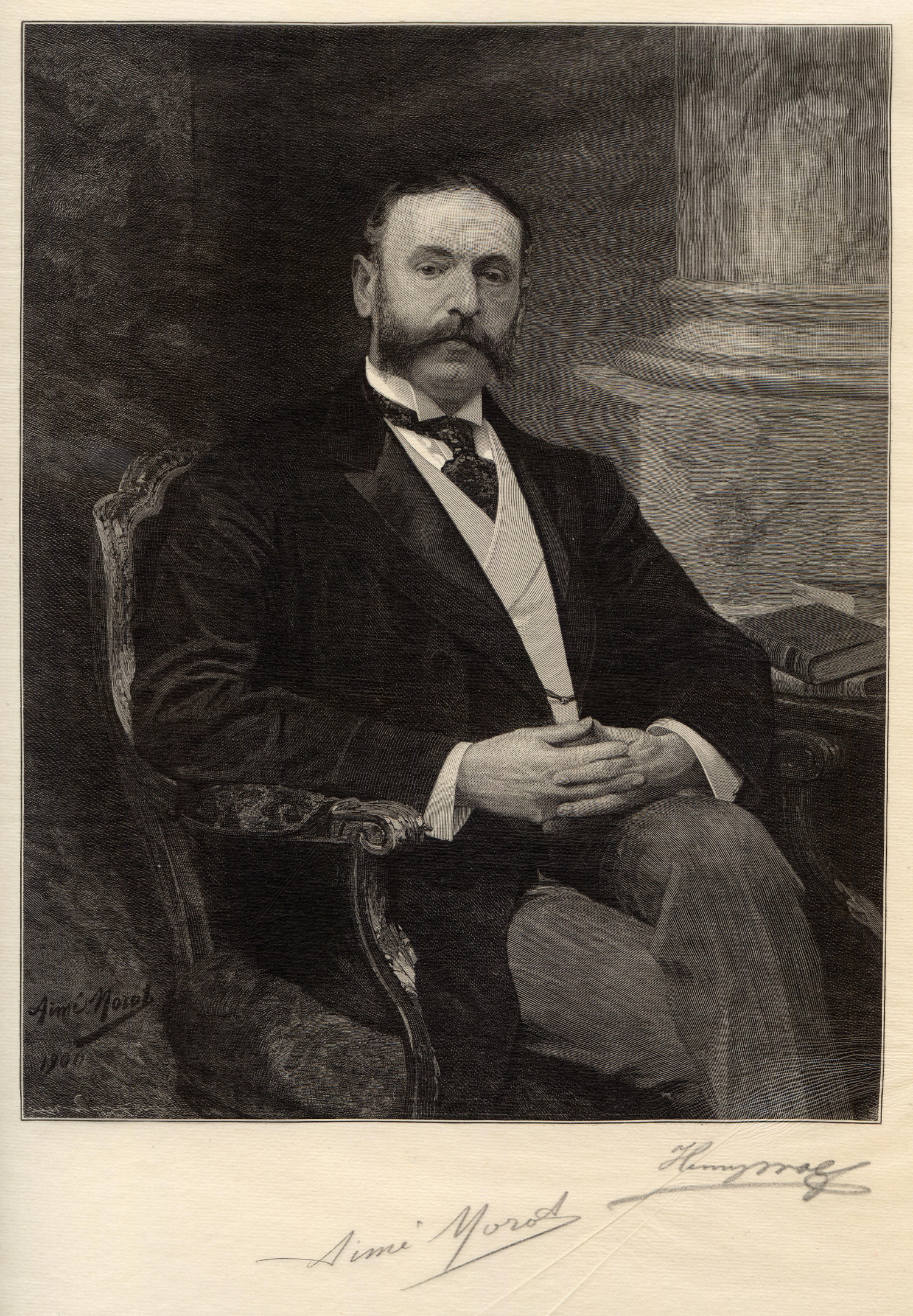
Louis Stern, 1900. Wood engraving by Henry Wolf, 1904. Signed by Aimé Morot and Henry Wolf.

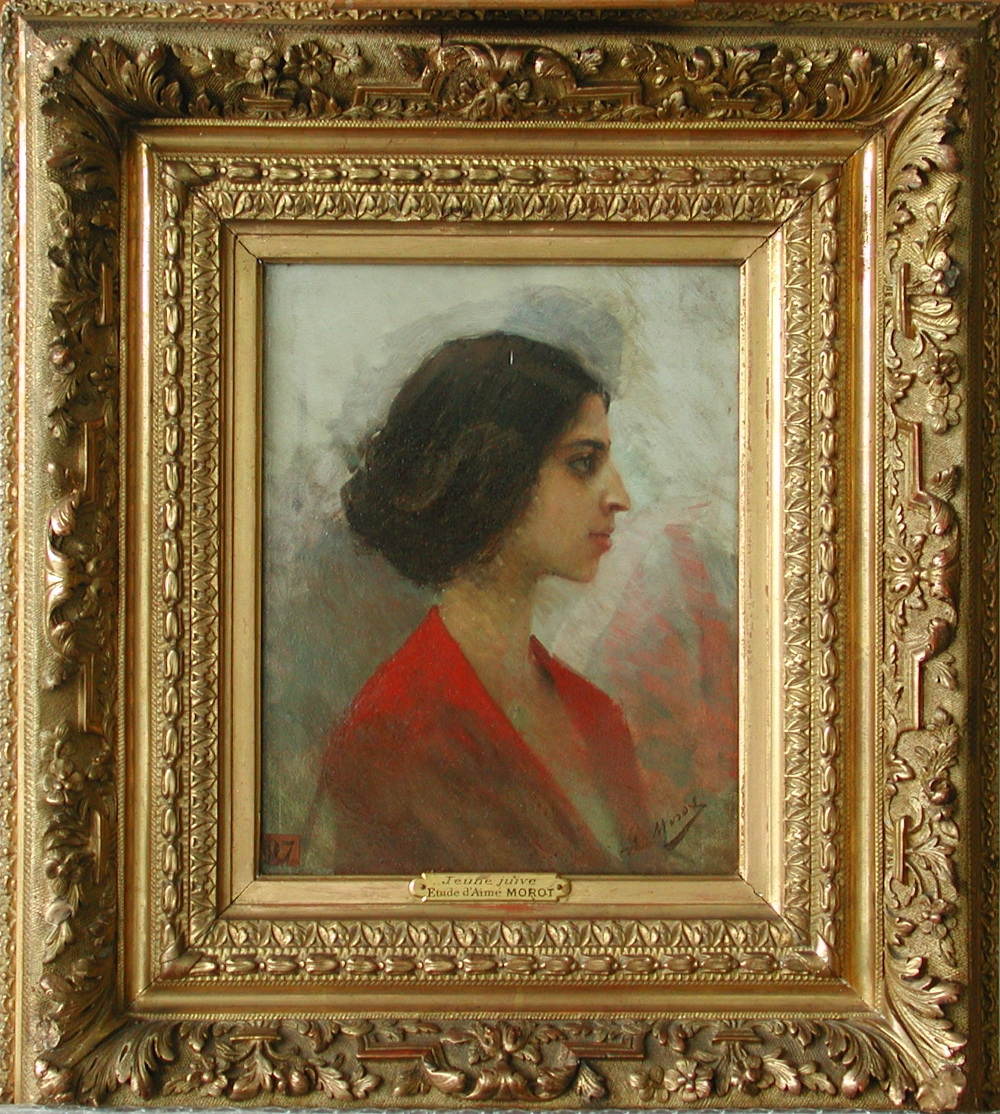
Jeune Juive, Etude d'Aimé Morot in original frame, no date. Oil on wood panel, size 22 x 27 cm.

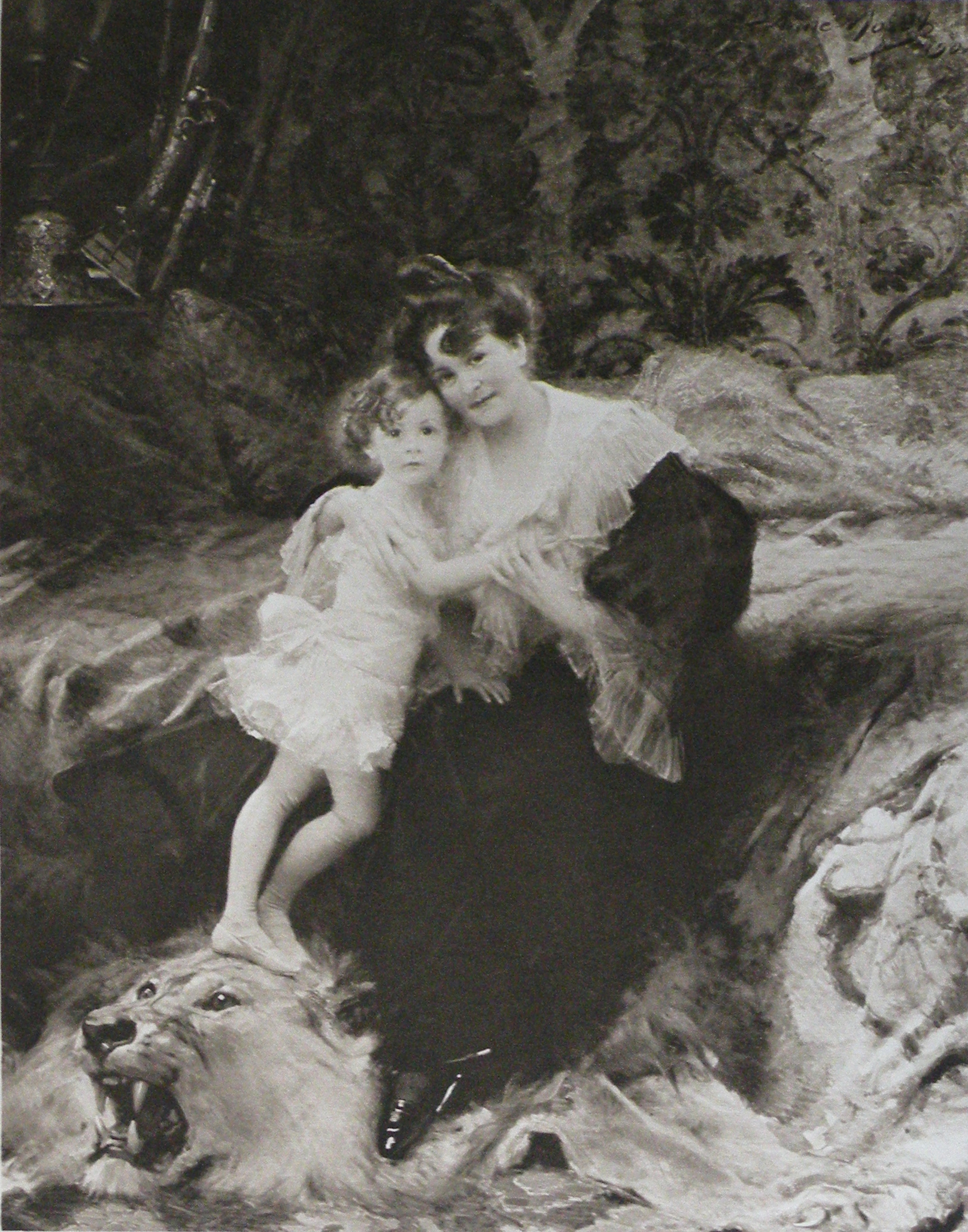
Madame Aimé Morot et sa fille, 1901.

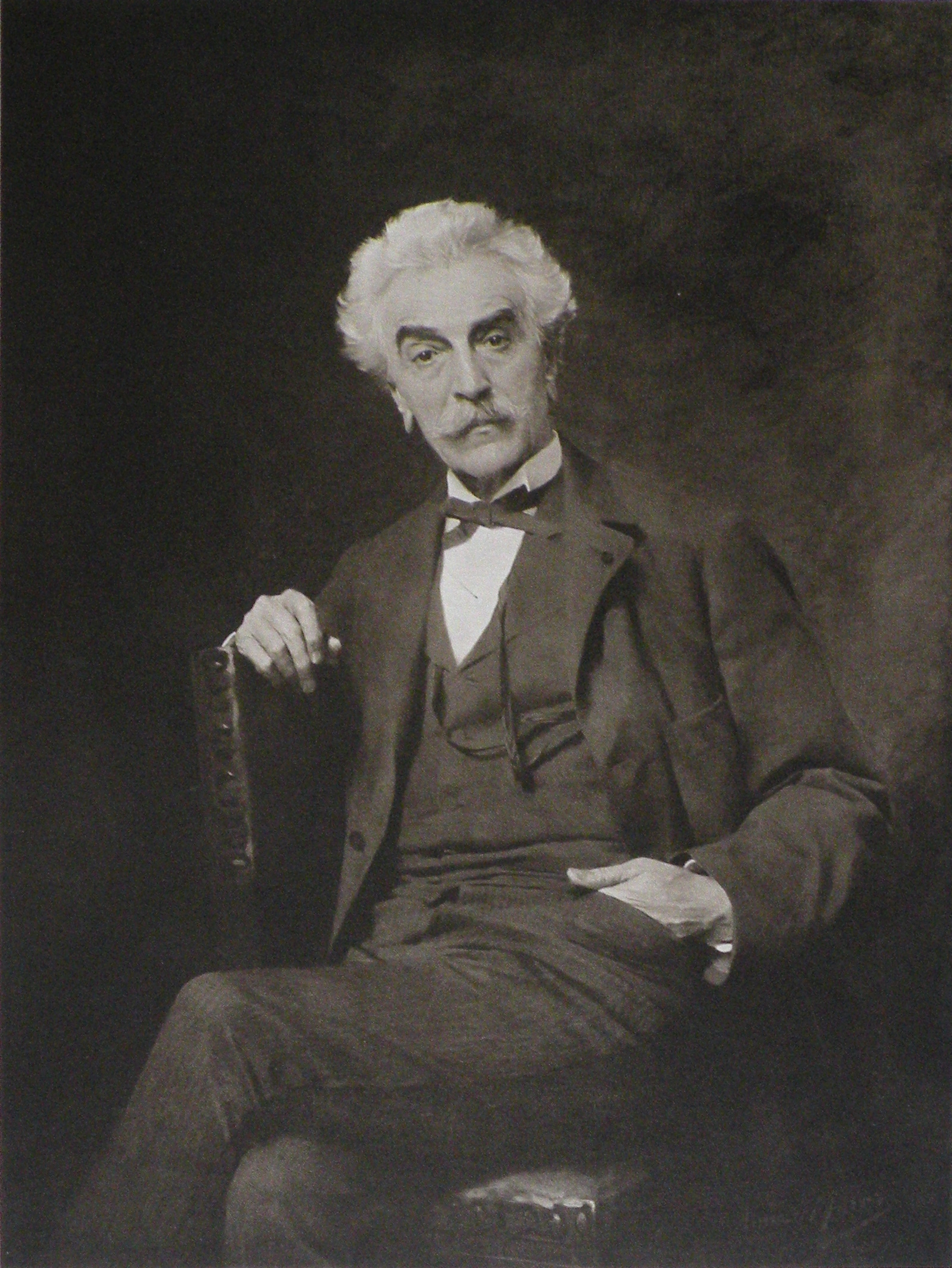
Portrait of Jean-Léon Gérôme, no date.

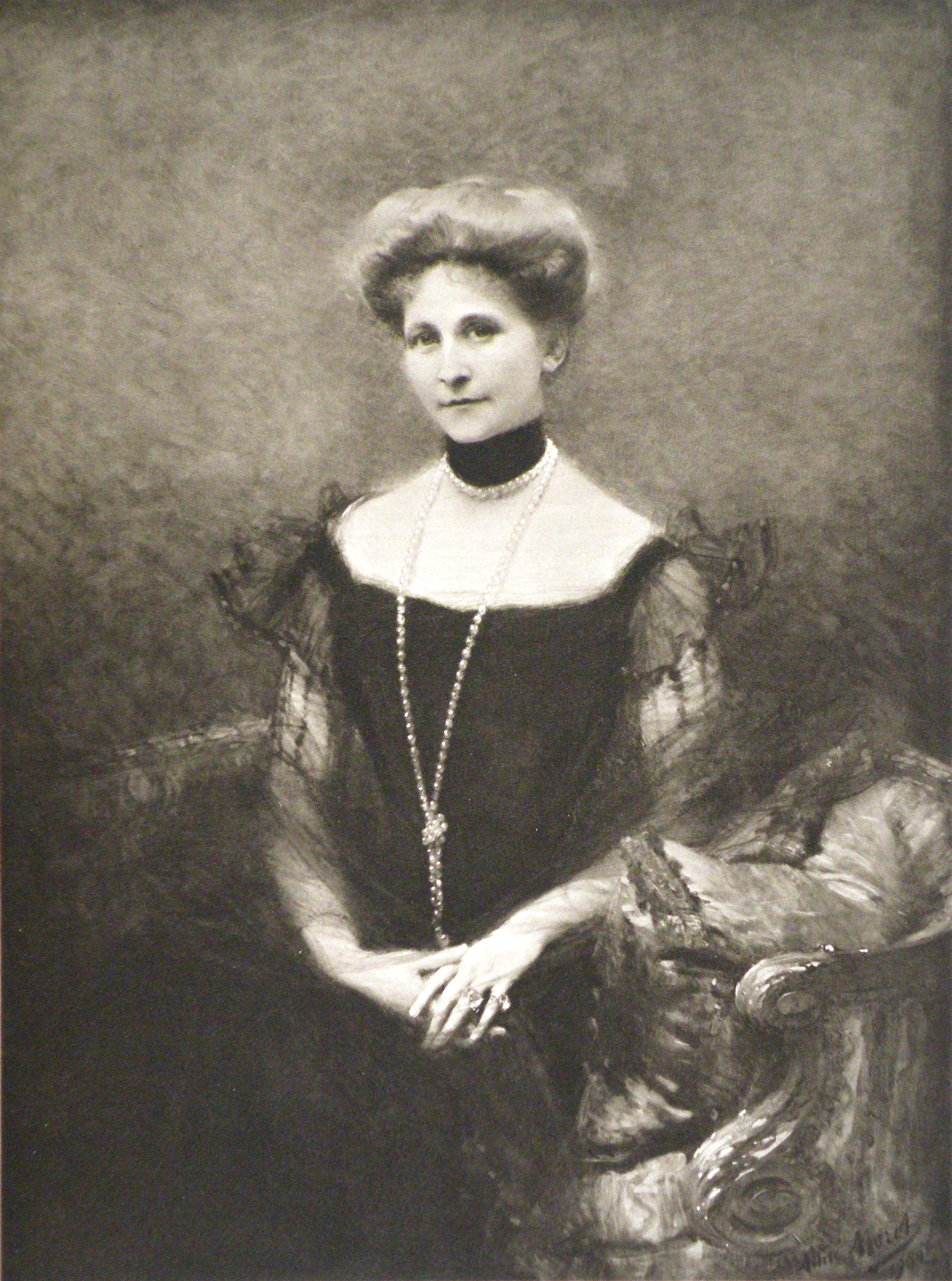
Madame Aymé Darblay 1902.

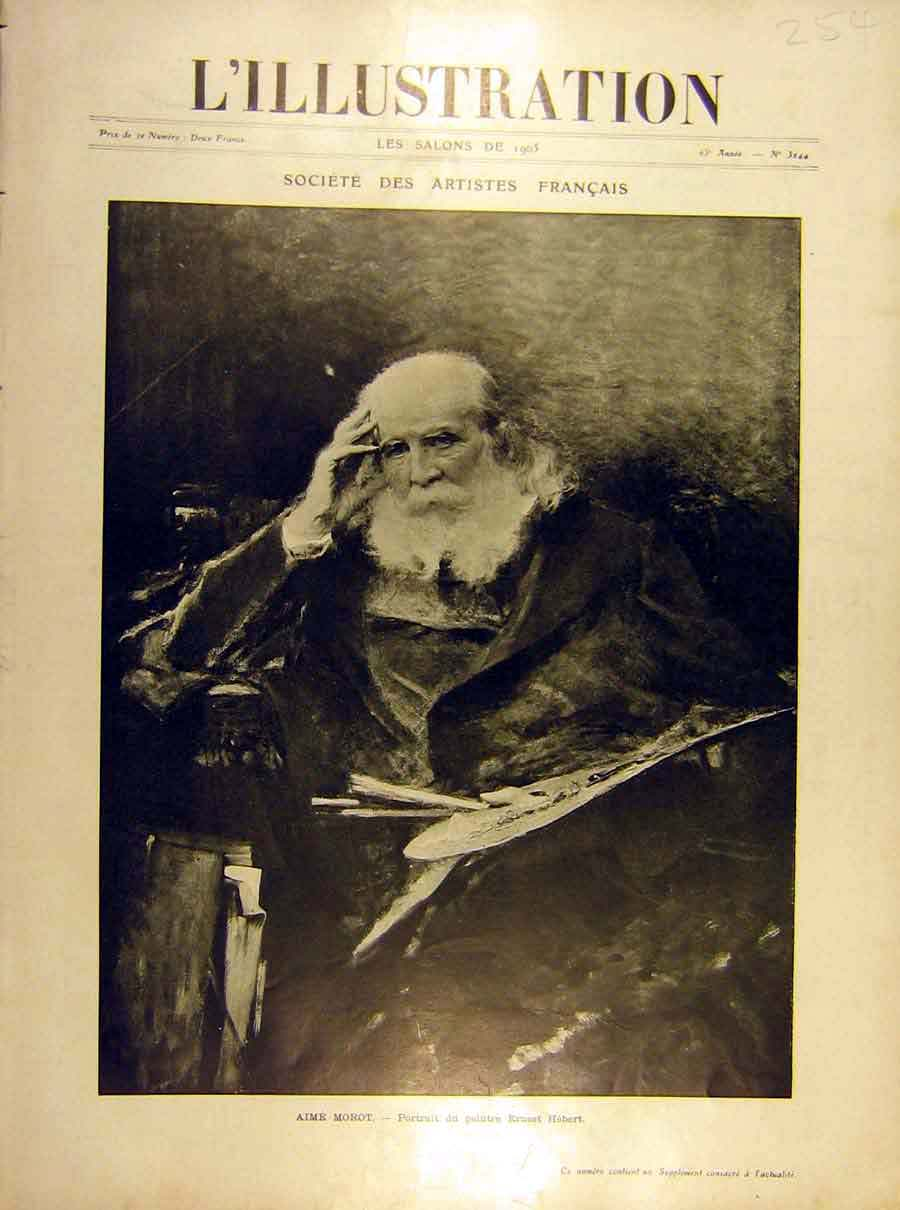
painter Ernest Hébert, portrait on cover of L'Illustration, 1905.

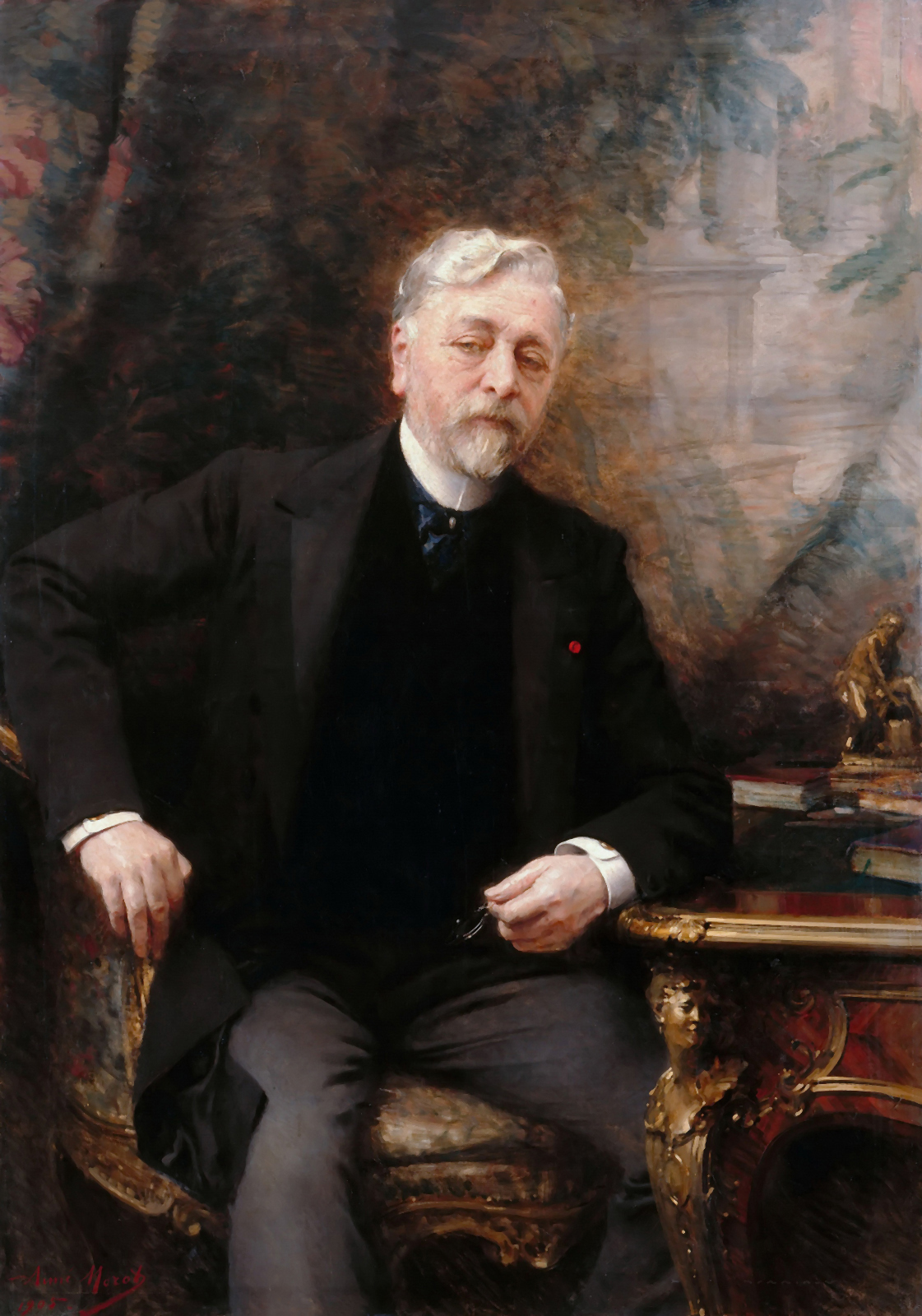
Portrait of Gustave Eiffel, 1905.

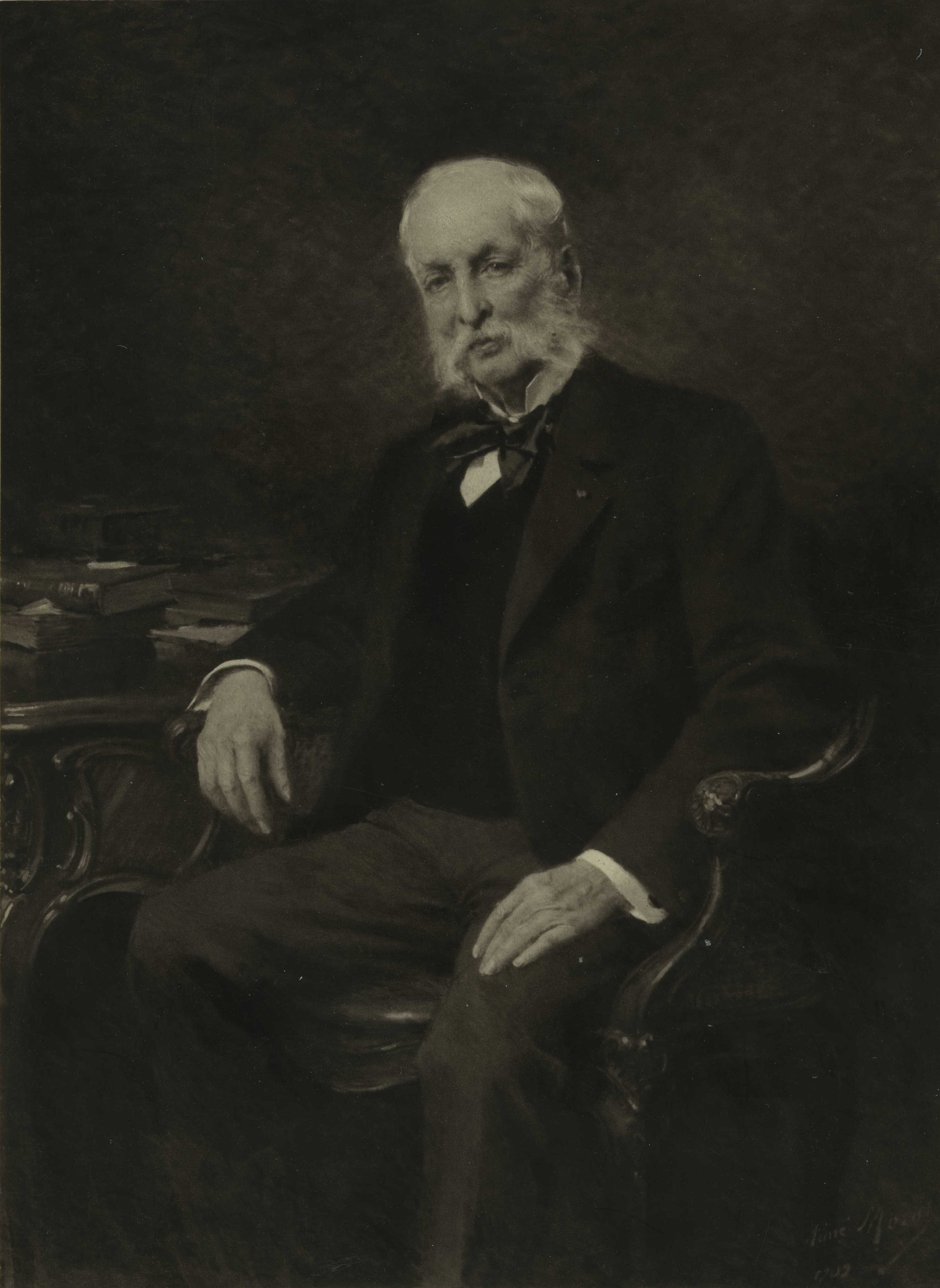
Portrait of Monsieur Eugène Goüin, exhibited at the Salon de Paris, 1909.

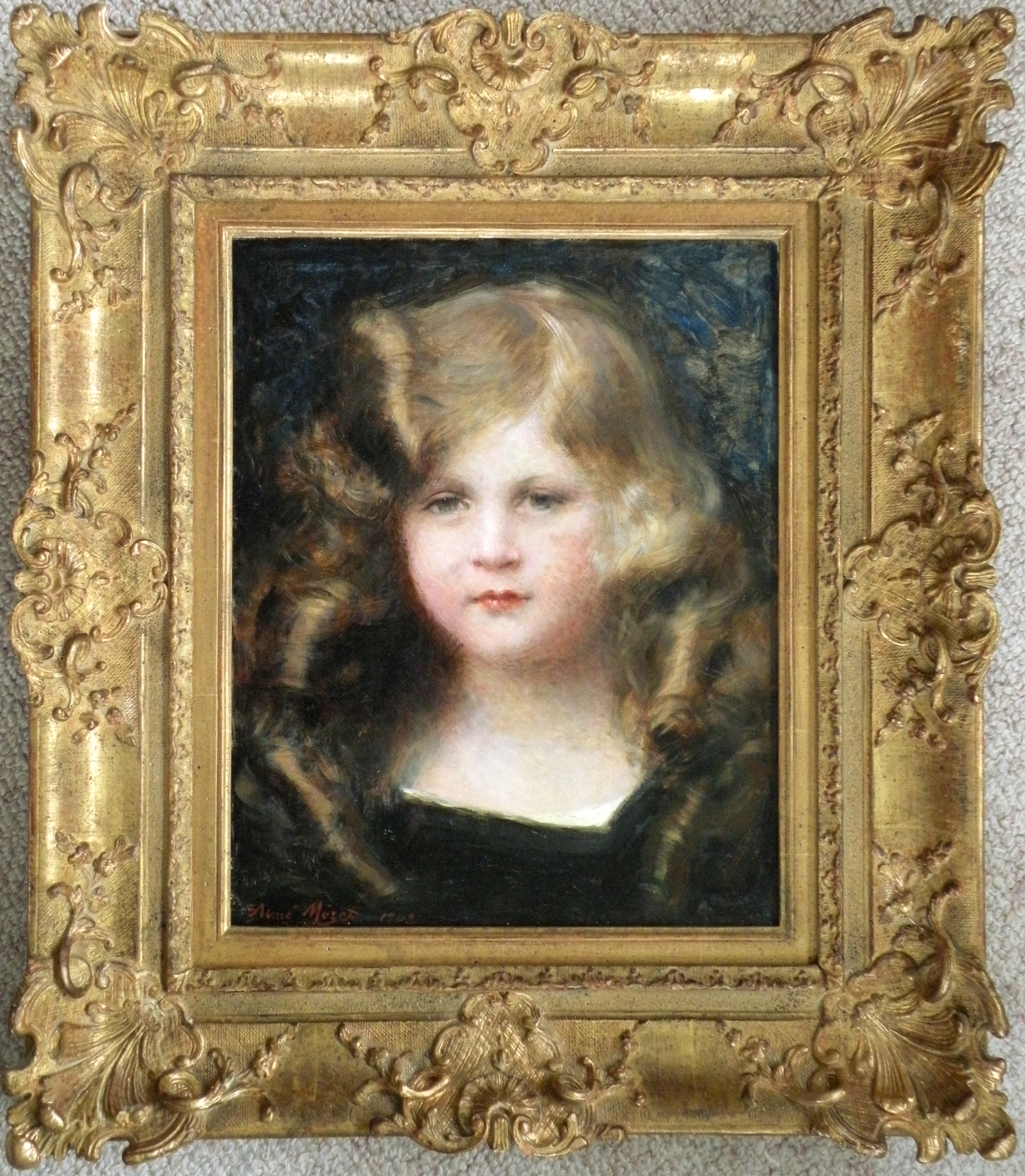
Portrait of a girl by Aimé Nicolas Morot, painted in 1909 and in original frame. Oil on canvas, size 32 x 40 cm.

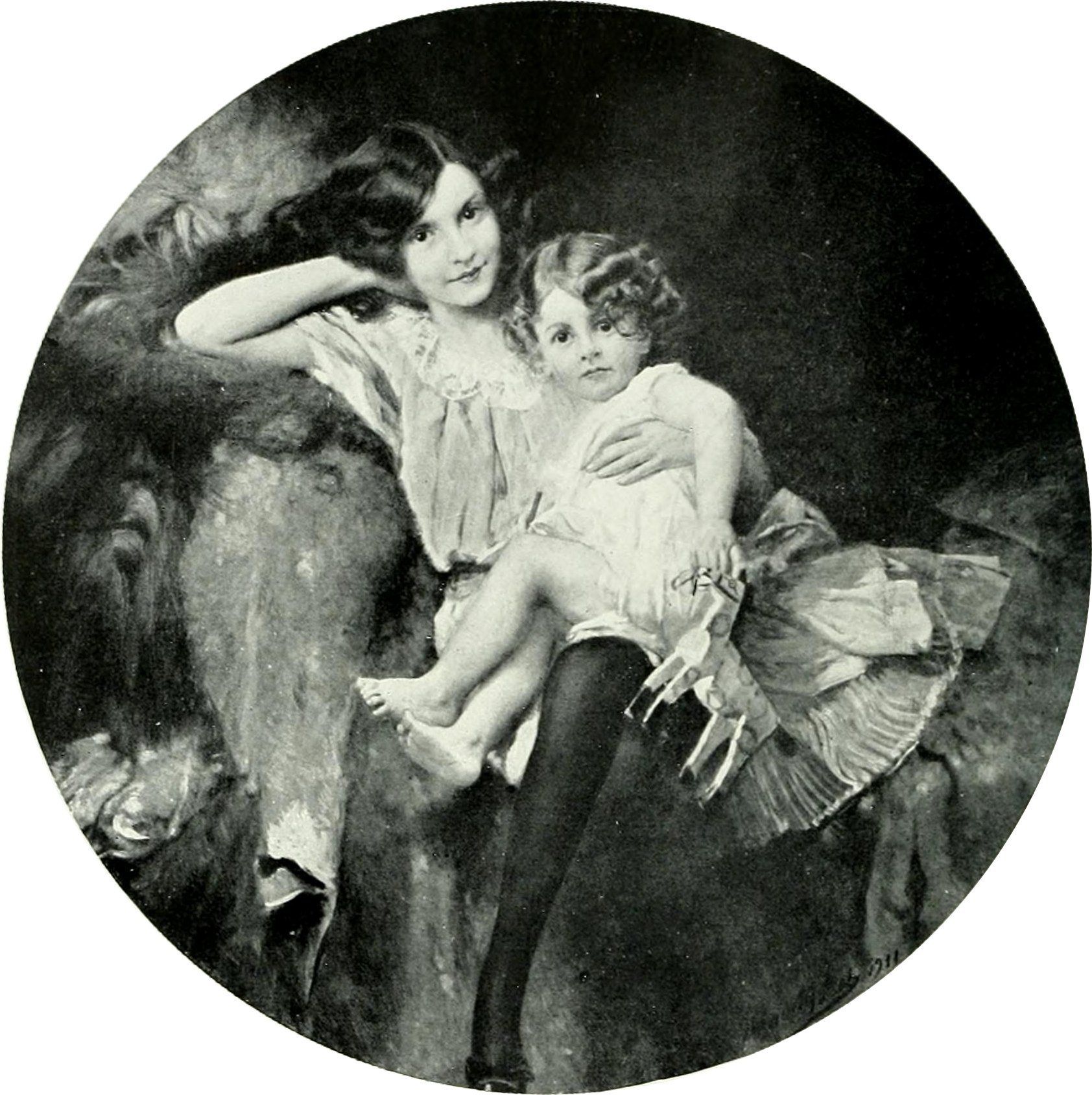
Frère et Soeur, Portrait of the children of Mr. Morot. Exposed at the Salon de Paris in 1911.

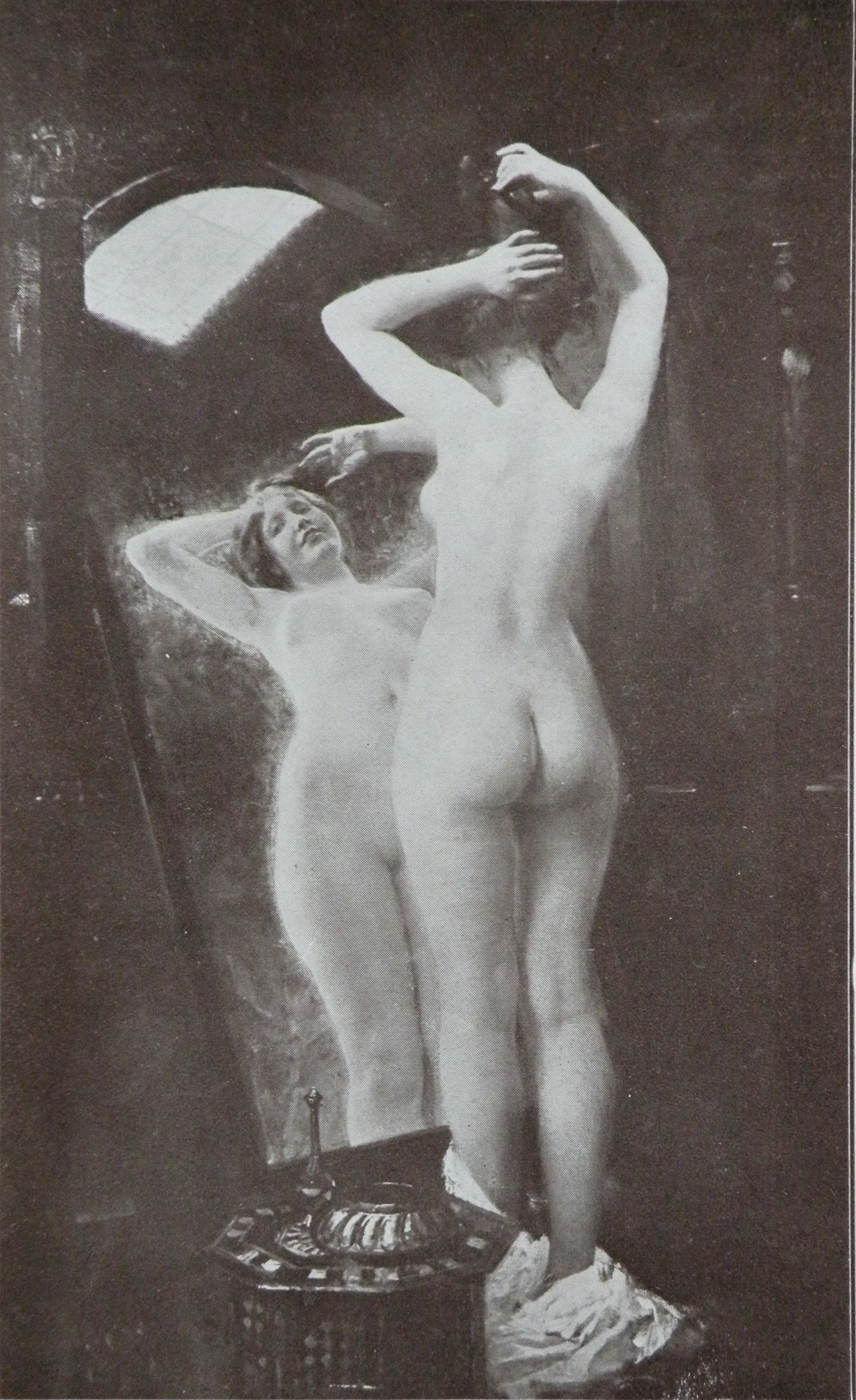
Ephemère printemps (Les deux psychés). Exposed at the Salon de Paris in 1912.

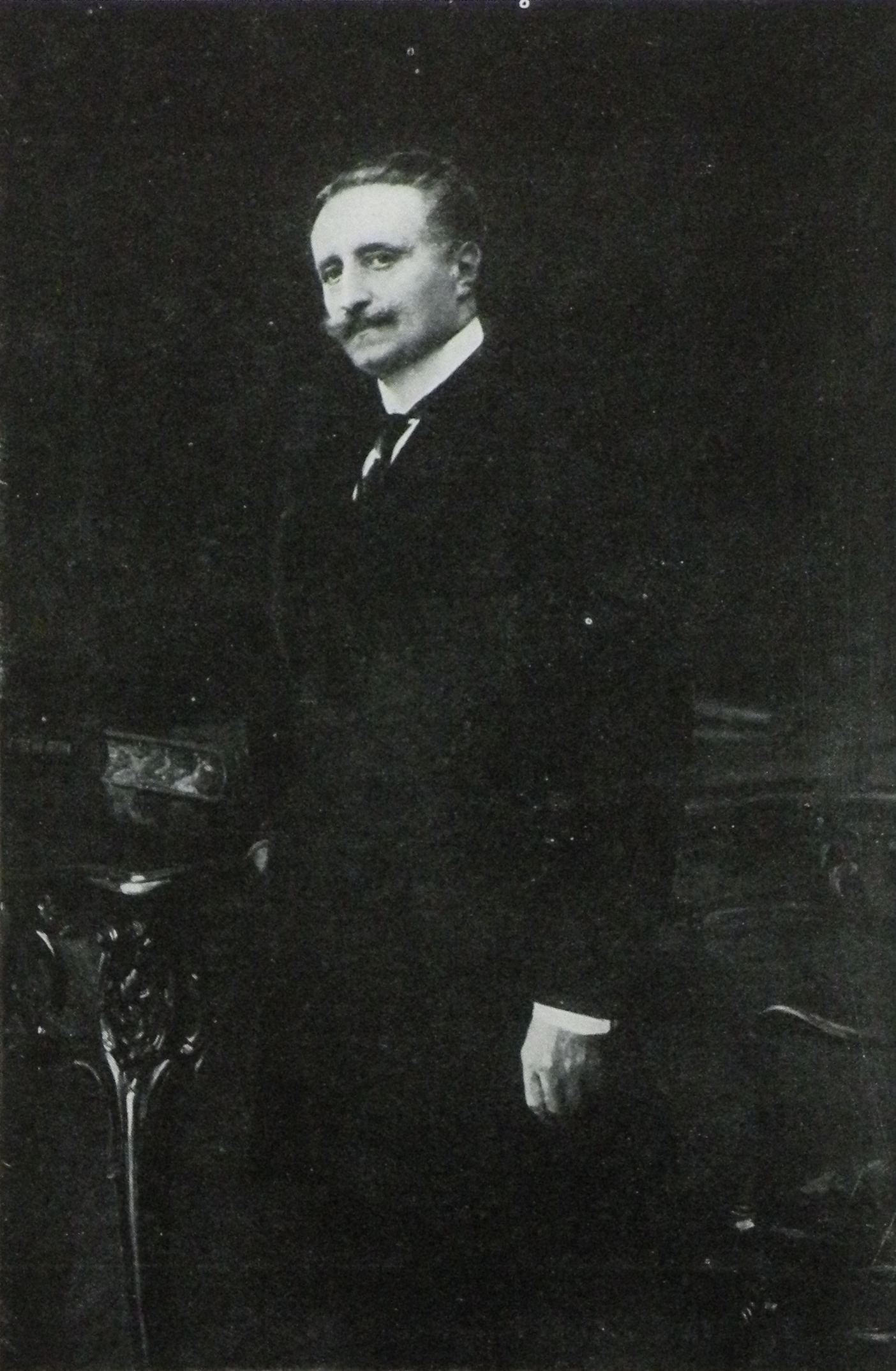
Portrait of Mr. Paul Deschanel. This was the last painting by Aimé Morot exposed at the Salon de Paris in 1913.

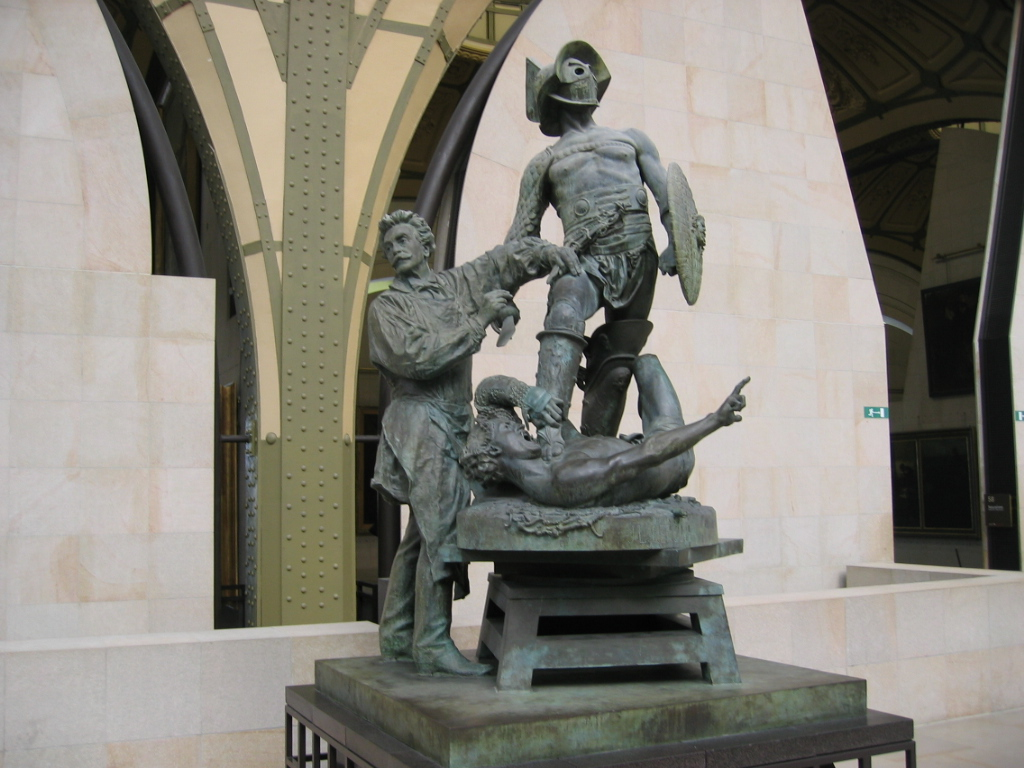
Sculpture by Jean-Léon Gérôme and Aimé Morot, Musée d'Orsay, Paris.

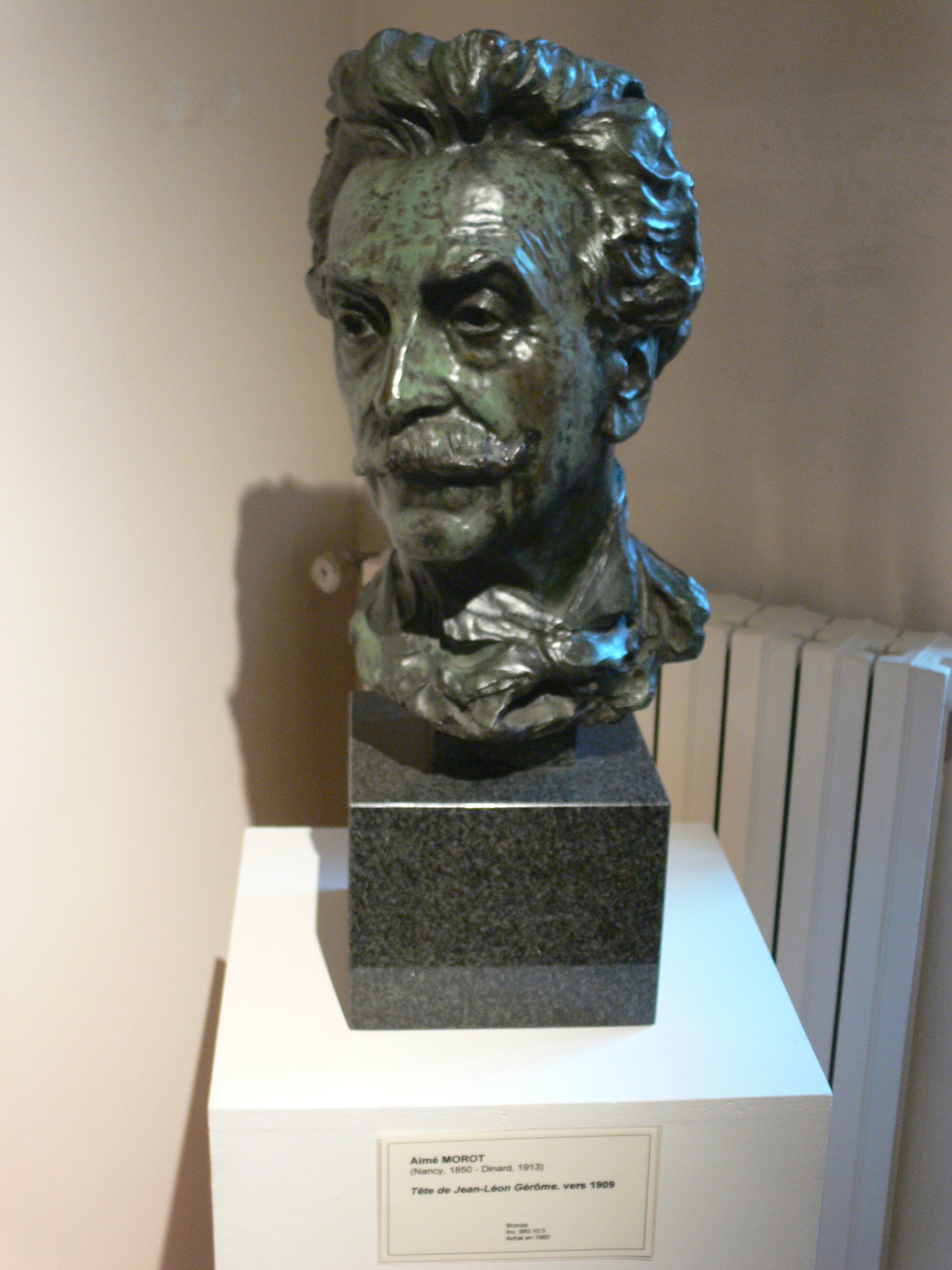
Tête de Jean-Léon Gérôme, Aimé-Nicolas Morot, vers 1909, bronze. Musée Georges-Garret, Vesoul, France.

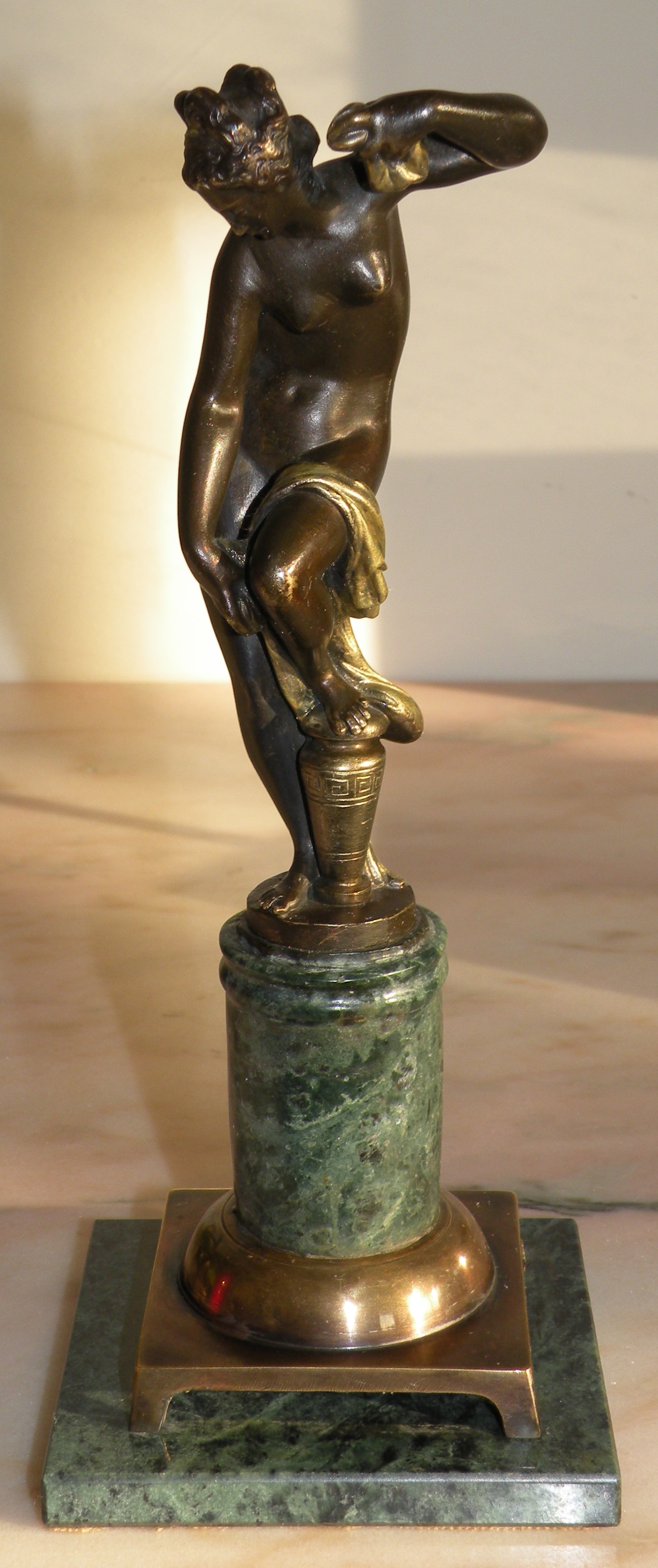
Vénus au bain, no date. Cast bronze on green marble base.

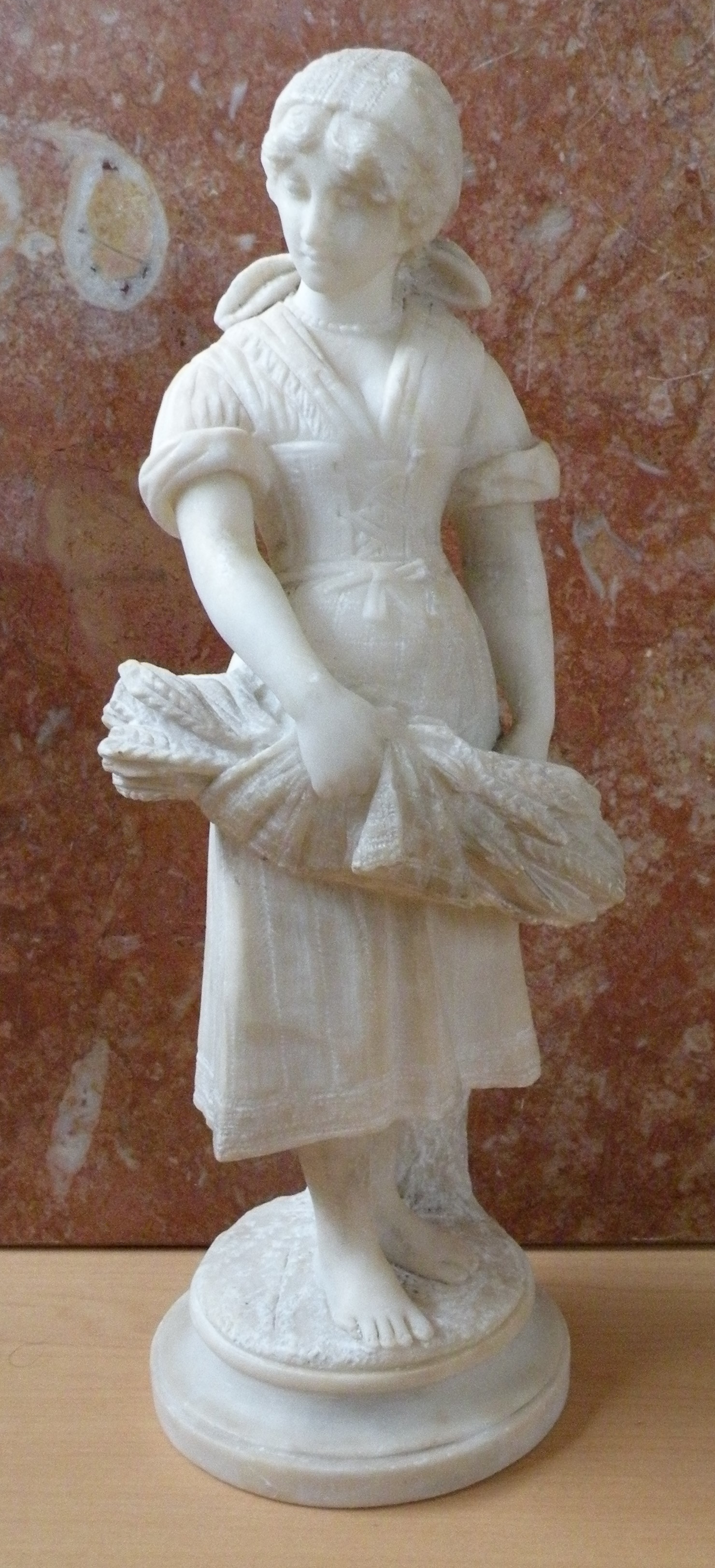
Paysanne, Aimé-Nicolas Morot, no date. Alabaster sculpture of young farmer girl.

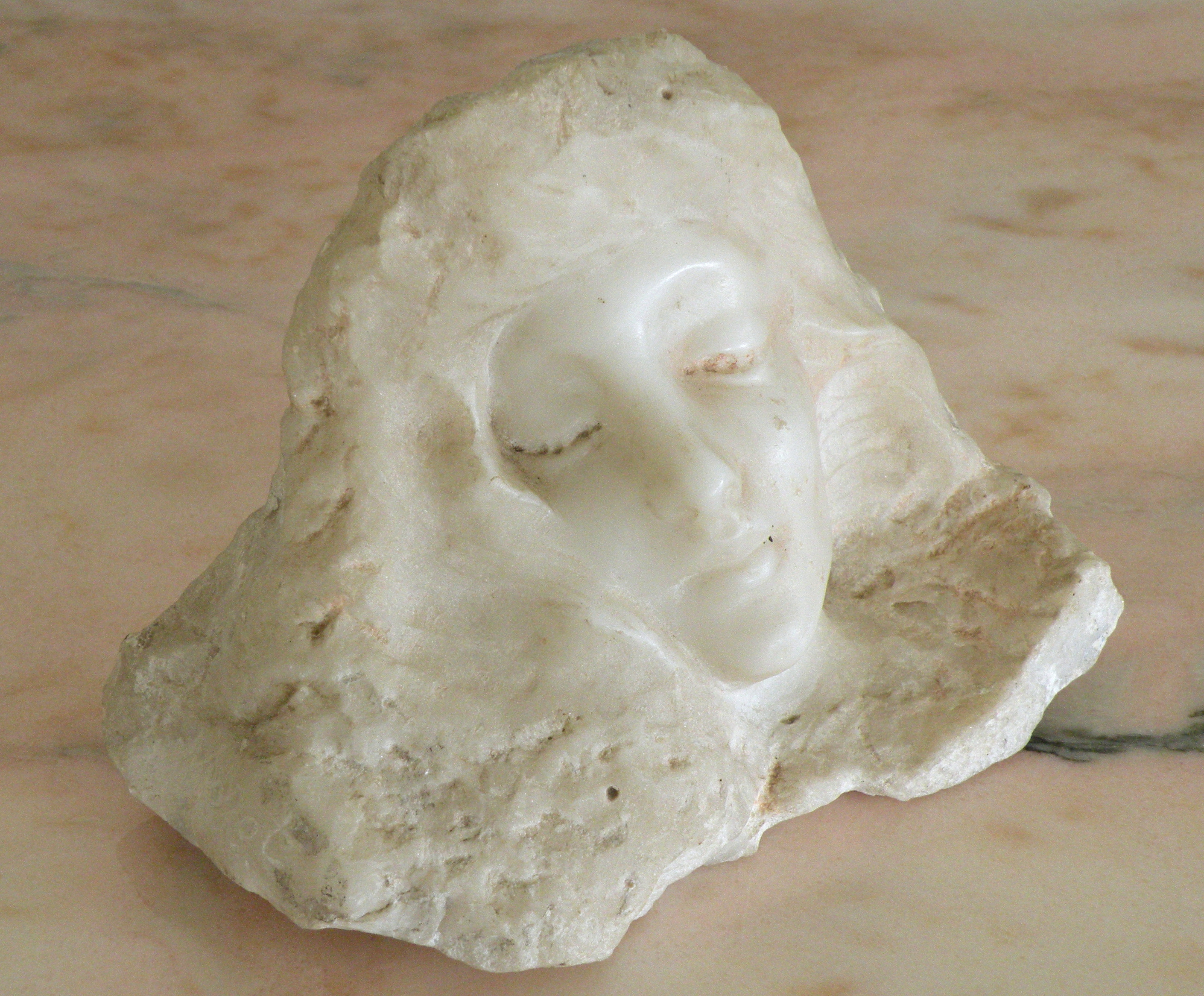
Head of young lady, Aimé-Nicolas Morot, no date. Portrait sculpted in high-relief against a chiseled background in white marble.

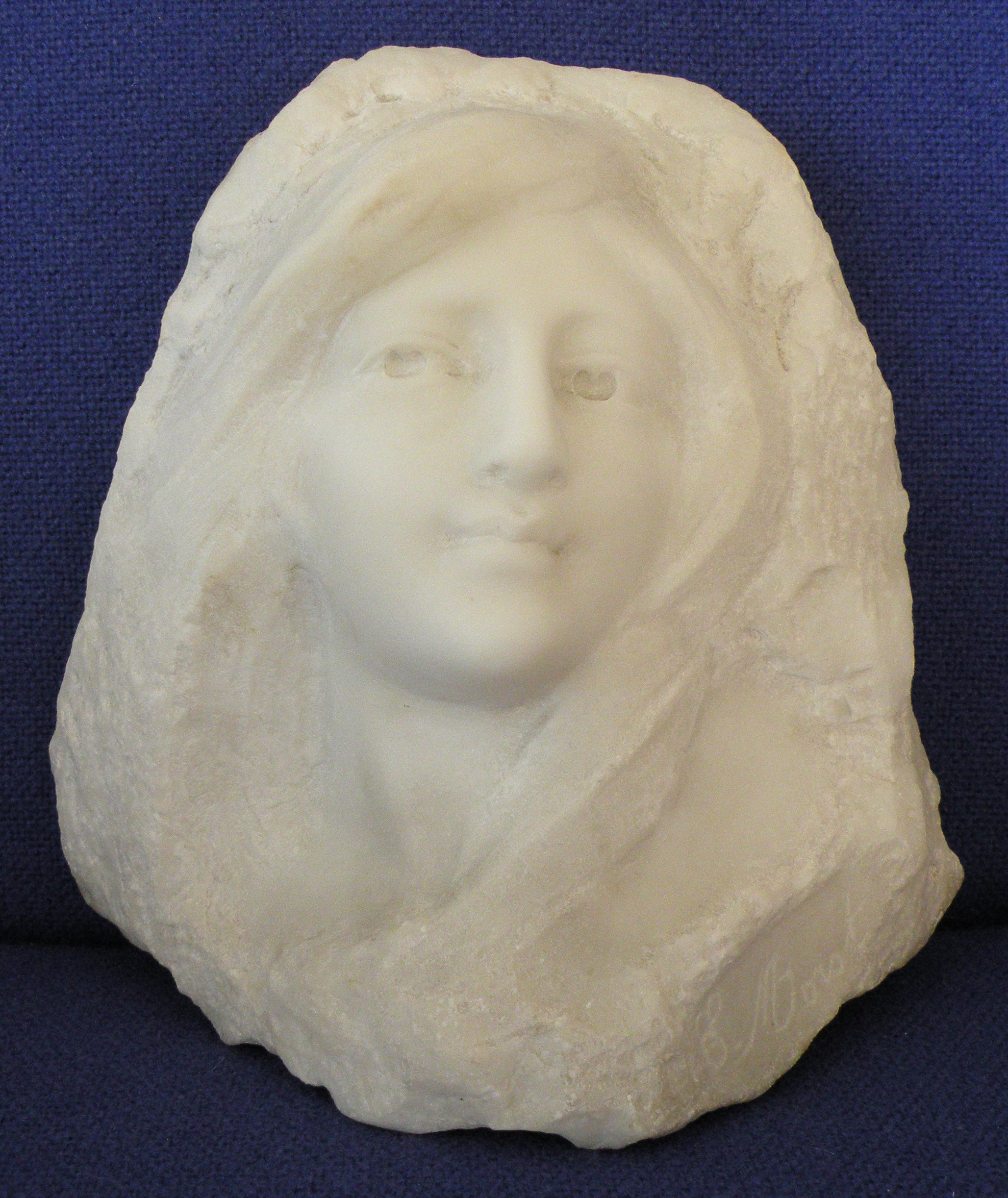
Girl's face, Aimé-Nicolas Morot, no date. Sculpted in relief in white Carrara marble.
