= Marwin =

Marwin is a masculine given name. Notable people with this name include:

- Marwin Angeles (born 1991), Italian-born Filipino footballer
- Marwin Evans (born 1993), American professional gridiron football player
- Marwin González (born 1989), Venezuelan professional baseball player
- Marwin Hitz (born 1987), Swiss footballer
- Marwin Pita (born 1985), Ecuadorian footballer
- Marwin Reuvers (born 1999), Dutch footballer
- Marwin Talsma (born 1997), Dutch long track speed skater

== See also ==
- Paul J. Marwin (1885–1931), American lawyer and politician in Minnesota
- Marvin (given name)
