= Johannes Alfred Hultman =

Swedish musician and evangelist (1861–1942)

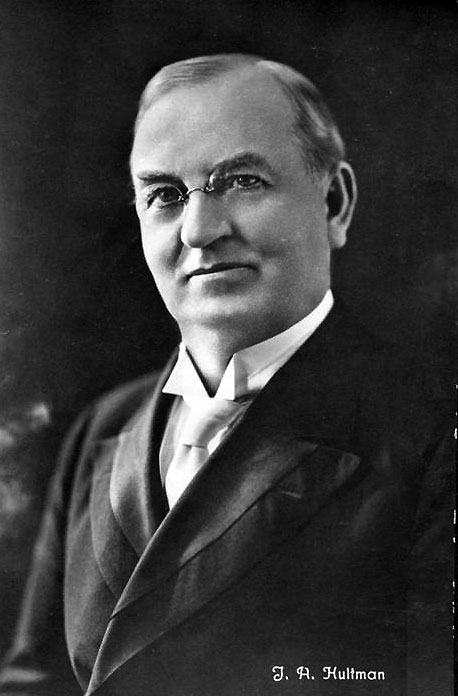
- Born: July 6, 1861; Jönköping County, Småland, Sweden
- Died: August 7, 1942 (aged 81); Glendale, California, US
- Occupation(s): evangelist, singer, musician, composer, publisher
- Spouse(s): Carolina Palmer; Margaret Jansson
- Children: Four

Johannes Alfred Hultman (July 6, 1861 – August 7, 1942) was a Swedish evangelist, singer, musician, composer and publisher. In 1885 he was one of the founding members of the Evangelical Mission Covenant Church.

== Biography ==
J. A. Hultman was born in 1861 on a farm in Jönköping County in the province of Småland, Sweden. His family emigrated to America in 1869 and settled on a farm near Essex, Iowa.

His religious faith and interest in music began at early age. As a young man he studied for two years at the Chicago Athenaeum while leading a choir at the present-day Douglass Park Covenant Church. He later served as pastor at Covenant churches in Nebraska and Massachusetts.

A revivalist preacher while still in his teens, Hultman did not become an ordained minister until 1900. After six years as an assistant pastor in Worcester, Massachusetts, he resigned his post to allow more time for his concert tours and business activities. One of his ventures was the Hultman Conservatory of Music, which he and his son operated in Worcester and later moved to Chicago.

His warm personality and uplifting songs earned Hultman the title of "The Sunshine Singer". In 1889 he joined the Swedish theologian P. P. Waldenström on a preaching tour of the United States, for which he provided the music. He toured extensively, becoming well known in Swedish-American communities and in Sweden, which from 1909 onwards he visited frequently. Wherever he went, he brought along his trademark portable organ. When suspected of being a bootlegger during Prohibition, he was asked if he carried any "moonshine". He replied that he only smuggled "sunshine".

Typically, a third of the proceeds from his concerts went to the sponsoring church while another third went to charity. Hultman was quite generous with the third that he received. The 1925 construction of Caroline Hall at North Park University, for instance, was partially funded by his concert earnings. His connection to the school went back to the years 1896–1897, when he had served on the music faculty there.

J. A. Hultman was married twice. He and his first wife, Carolina, had four children. The couple met in Chicago, raised a family and for many years collaborated in his musical ministry. Carolina Hultman died in 1919 during a visit to Sweden. Hultman met his second wife, Margaret, while on one of his American tours. He continued working as an evangelist until his death in 1942.

== Songbooks ==
Hultman published three collections of hymns: Cymbalen (The Cymbal), Jubelklangen (The Sound of Jubilation) and Solskenssånger (Sunshine Songs). He also contributed to Sions Basun (Zion's Trumpet), the first official hymnal of the Covenant Church.

He composed the music for countless hymns, including Tack min Gud, för vad som varit (Thanks my God for all that has been), which in one English version begins:

Thanks my God for all that has been,
Thanks for all that you bestow.
Thanks for all the years that have been,
Thanks for minutes as they flow.
Thanks for spring days, warm with sunshine,
Thanks for fall days, dark and drear.
Thanks for tears, forgotten oft time,
Thanks for peace, my heart to cheer.

== Selected melodies ==
Hultman was among the composers who set these lyrics to music:

- Klara stjärna, lys och värna (Bright star, shine and protect) by Nils Frykman
- Låt det ljuva solsken in (Let the sunshine in) by Ada Blenkhorn
- När hela jorden sover (When all the world is sleeping) by Lina Sandell
- Stjärnor i kronan (Will there be any stars) by Eliza E. Hewitt
- Tack min Gud, för vad som varit (Thanks my God for all that has been) by August L. Storm
- Tro på vår Herre, älska varandra (Believe in the Lord, love one another) by Nils Frykman
- Världen ta men ge mig Jesus (Take the world but give me Jesus) by Fanny Crosby

== Recordings ==
Hultman made numerous recordings on both sides of the Atlantic. A few of them can be found on video-sharing websites or at digital download services. One of them was on the album "From Sweden to America", which was released as an LP in 1981 and as a CD in 1996. Recorded in Sweden and the United States between 1917 and 1980, the twenty-three tracks on the CD have been available at iTunes and Amazon since 2011. The song "Mitt Barndomshem" (My Childhood Home), with words and music by Hultman, was recorded by Kjell Hansson in 1980. Hultman also made some acoustically-recorded 10" 78 RPM "Personal Records" on the Columbia Graphophone label sometime after 1908:

Columbia 33079/33174 "Han är likadan i dag" & "När hela jorden sover"

Columbia 33157/33161 "Det Brister en Sträng" & "Sag har du i dag ej en blomma"

Columbia 33164/33165 "O, Sköna Vår" & "O, Att Jag Kunde"

Columbia 61878/61885 "Mitt Barndomshem" & "Glom Aldrig Bort de Kära"

Columbia 61882/61887 "Sa Älskade Gud Världen" & "Härliga Dag"

Columbia 91031 "Var ar ditt hem?" & "Ett Hem om an sa Ringa"

All these records also read "Komponerad och sjungen av J. A. Hultman" and "J. A. Hultman & Sons Co. Worcester, Mass."
