= Stephen Franklin =

Stephen or Steve(n) Franklin may refer to:

- Stephen Franklin (Babylon 5), Babylon 5 character
- Stephen Franklin (American football) (born 1988), American football linebacker
- Stephen T. Franklin, Christian theologian
- Steve Franklin (American football) in 2007 Dallas Cowboys season
- Steve Franklin (musician) in In Cahoots
