= Old Main (North Park University) =

- Old Main Building
- U.S. National Register of Historic Places
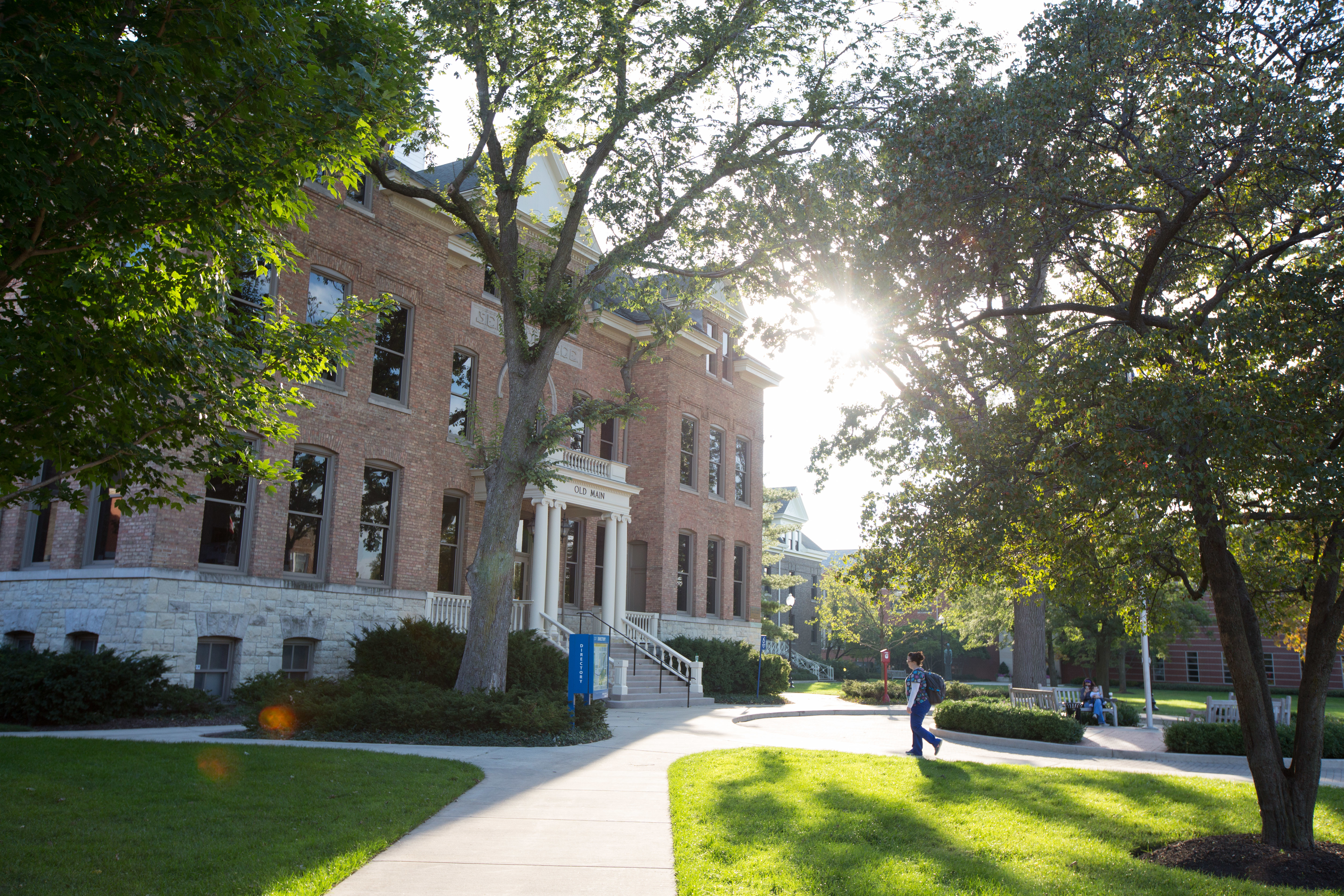

- Location within Chicago metropolitan area Location within Illinois Location within the United States
- Location: 3235 W. Foster Ave. on North Park University campus, Chicago, Illinois
- Coordinates: 41°58′30″N 87°42′36″W
- Built: 1893-94
- Built by: J.A. Modin
- Architectural style: Georgian
- NRHP reference No.: 82002529
- Added to NRHP: February 11, 1982

Old Main is a historic building on the campus of North Park University in Chicago, Illinois. Built in 1893–94, it is the oldest building at the university, which was known as Swedish Evangelical Mission Covenant College at the time. Contractor J.A. Modin built the Georgian Revival building, which features a prominent cupola atop its roof. The building became a symbol of both the university itself and the surrounding Swedish-American neighborhood, as the college was a Swedish-American institution attended by Swedes throughout the country. It also hosted the Evangelical Covenant Church's Annual Meeting in its early years; at the time, the church was closely affiliated with the Swedish-American community.

The building was added to the National Register of Historic Places on February 11, 1982.
