= Parable of the Good Samaritan =

Parable taught by Jesus according to the Gospel of Luke

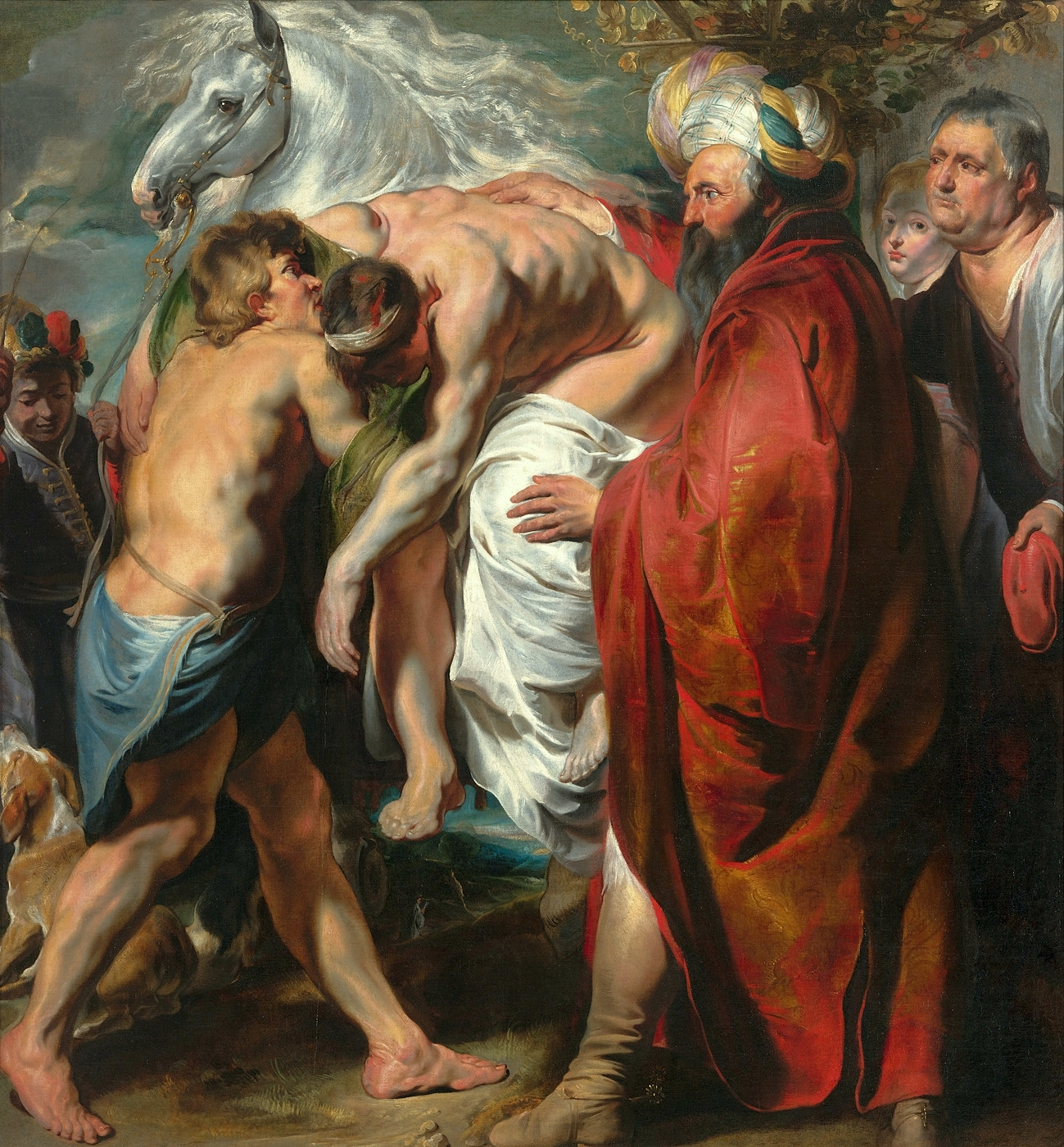
The Good Samaritan by Jacob Jordaens, c. 1616

The parable of the Good Samaritan is told by Jesus in the Gospel of Luke. It is about a traveler (implicitly understood to be Jewish) who is stripped of clothing, beaten, and left half dead alongside the road. A Jewish priest and then a Levite come by, both avoiding the man. A Samaritan happens upon him and—though Samaritans and Jews were generally antagonistic toward each other—helps him. Jesus tells the parable in response to a provocative question from a lawyer in the context of the Great Commandment: "And who is my neighbour?" The conclusion is that the neighbour figure in the parable is the one who shows mercy to their fellow man or woman.

Some Christians, such as Augustine, have interpreted the parable allegorically, with the Samaritan representing Jesus Christ, who saves the sinful soul. Others discount this allegory as unrelated to the parable's original meaning and see the parable as exemplifying the ethics of Jesus.

The parable has inspired painting, sculpture, satire, poetry, photography, film, and many others. The phrase "Good Samaritan", meaning someone who helps a stranger, derives from this parable, and many hospitals and charitable organizations are named after the Good Samaritan.

== Narrative ==
In Luke 10, the parable is introduced by a question, known as the Great Commandment:

Behold, a certain lawyer stood up and tested him, saying, "Teacher, what shall I do to inherit eternal life?"

He said to him, "What is written in the law? How do you read it?"

He answered, "You shall love the Lord your God with all your heart, with all your soul, with all your strength, and with all your mind; and your neighbor as yourself."

He said to him, "You have answered correctly. Do this, and you will live."

But he, desiring to justify himself, asked Jesus, "Who is my neighbor?"

— Luke 10:25–29, World English Bible

Jesus replies with a story:

Jesus answered, "A certain man was going down from Jerusalem to Jericho, and he fell among robbers, who both stripped him and beat him, and departed, leaving him half dead. By chance a certain priest was going down that way. When he saw him, he passed by on the other side. In the same way a Levite also, when he came to the place, and saw him, passed by on the other side. But a certain Samaritan, as he travelled, came where he was. When he saw him, he was moved with compassion, came to him, and bound up his wounds, pouring on oil and wine. He set him on his own animal, and brought him to an inn, and took care of him. On the next day, when he departed, he took out two denarii, gave them to the host, and said to him, 'Take care of him. Whatever you spend beyond that, I will repay you when I return.' Now which of these three do you think seemed to be a neighbor to him who fell among the robbers?"

He said, "He who showed mercy on him."

Then Jesus said to him, "Go and do likewise."

— Luke 10:30–37, World English Bible

== Historical context ==
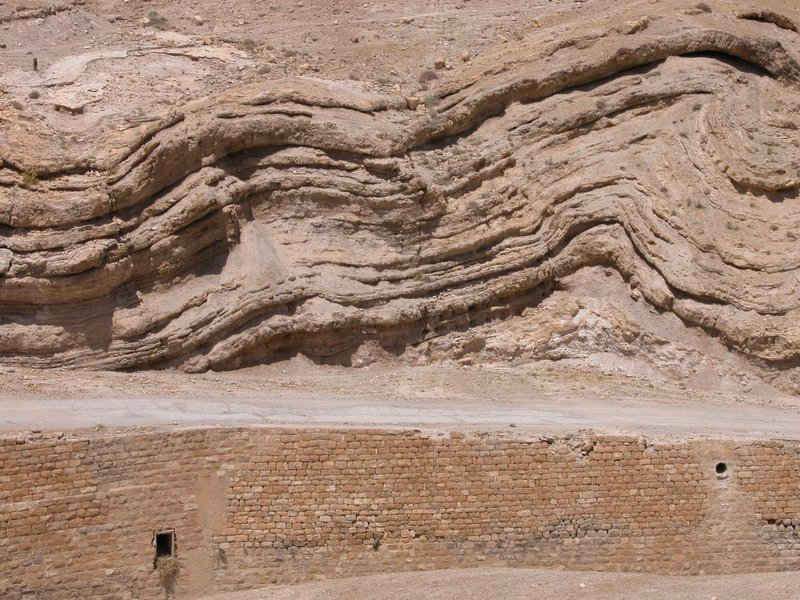
The road from Jerusalem to Jericho

=== Road from Jerusalem to Jericho ===
In the time of Jesus, the road from Jerusalem to Jericho was notorious for its danger and difficulty, and was known as the "Way of Blood" because "of the blood which is often shed there by robbers who robbed people". Martin Luther King Jr., on the day before his assassination, described the road as follows:

I remember when Mrs. King and I were first in Jerusalem. We rented a car and drove from Jerusalem down to Jericho. And as soon as we got on that road, I said to my wife, "I can see why Jesus used this as the setting for his parable." It's a winding, meandering road. It's really conducive for ambushing. You start out in Jerusalem, which is about 1200 miles—or rather 1,200 feet (370 m) above sea level. And by the time you get down to Jericho, fifteen or twenty minutes later, you're about 2,200 feet (670 m) below sea level. That's a dangerous road.

— Martin Luther King Jr., "I've Been to the Mountaintop" (April 3, 1968)

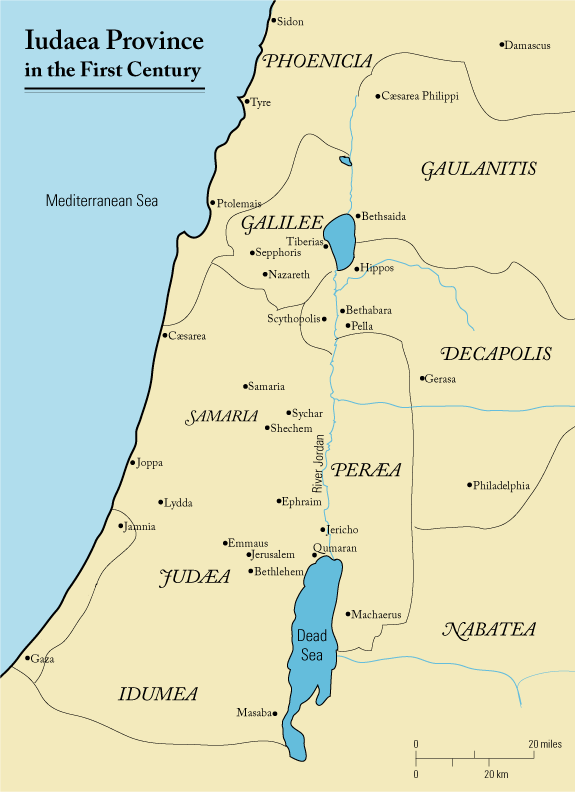
A map of the Roman Province of Judea in the time of Jesus. Jericho is just north of the Dead Sea, with Jerusalem to the west.

=== Samaritans and Jesus ===
While relations between Jews and Samaritans as closely related ethnoreligious groups in the region are historically complex and not purely negative, a distinct downturn occurred in the late 2nd century BCE during the Hasmonean dynasty, which involved the destruction of the Samaritan temple on Mount Gerizim in 128 BCE. In the early 1st century CE, Samaritans had desecrated the Jewish Temple at Passover with human bones. Due to this hatred, some think that the lawyer's phrase "The one who had mercy on him" (Luke 10:37) may indicate a reluctance to name the Samaritan. Or, on another, more positive note, it may indicate that the lawyer has recognized that both his questions have been answered and now concludes by generally expressing that anyone behaving thus is a (Leviticus 19:18) "neighbor" eligible to inherit eternal life. (Note: See, e.g., Lane's argument that the lawyer positively alludes to Exodus 34:6, with the word in 10:37a usually translated 'mercy' (ἔλεος) actually referencing Septuagint's translation of the Hebrew word חסד, 'covenantal loyalty', (Lane 2009, pp. 74–84))

As the story reached those who were unaware of its context—i.e., the oppression of the Samaritans, and the bitter hatred that Jesus' listeners and Samaritans had for each other—this aspect of the parable received less and less recognition; uninformed people saw "Samaritan" as merely a convenient name for that individual, when in fact it stood for "hated outsider who worships falsely and desecrates our religion". Today, to remedy this missing context, the story is often recast in a more modern setting where the people are ones in equivalent social groups known not to interact comfortably. Thus, cast appropriately, the parable regains its message to modern listeners: namely, that an individual of a social group they disapprove of can exhibit moral behavior that is superior to individuals of the groups they approve. Christians have used it as an example of Christianity's opposition to racial, ethnic, and sectarian prejudice. For example, anti-slavery campaigner William Jay described clergy who ignored slavery as "following the example of the priest and Levite". Martin Luther King Jr., in his April 1968 "I've Been to the Mountaintop" speech, described the Samaritan as "a man of another race". Sundee Tucker Frazier saw the Samaritan more specifically as an example of a "mixed-race" person. Klyne Snodgrass wrote: "On the basis of this parable we must deal with our own racism but must also seek justice for, and offer assistance to, those in need, regardless of the group to which they belong."

Samaritans appear elsewhere in the Gospels and the Book of Acts. In the Gospel of Luke, Jesus heals ten lepers and only the Samaritan among them thanks him, although Luke 9:51–56 depicts Jesus receiving a hostile reception in Samaria. Luke's favorable treatment of Samaritans is in line with the favorable treatment elsewhere in the book of the weak and of outcasts, generally. In John, Jesus has an extended dialogue with a Samaritan woman, and many Samaritans come to believe in him. In Matthew, he instructs his disciples not to preach to Gentiles or in Samaritan cities. In the Gospels, generally, "though the Jews of Jesus' day had no time for the 'half-breed' people of Samaria", Jesus "never spoke disparagingly about them" and "held a benign view of Samaritans".

Many see 2 Chronicles 28:8–15 as the model for the Samaritan's neighborly behavior in the parable. In Chronicles, Northern Israelite ancestors of Samaritans treat Judean enemies as fellow-Israelite neighbors. (Note: See, e.g., Wilkinson 1957, p. 94; Spencer 1984, pp. 317–349; Vermes 2004, p. 152; Kalimi 2009, pp. 47–53; Evans 2010, pp. 32–42; Fresta 2011, pp. 150–52, 253; Levine 2012, pp. 20–21; Scheffler 2013, pp. 1–8) After comparing the earlier account with the later parable presented to the expert in Israel's religious law, one could conclude: "Given the number and significance of these parallels and points of correspondence it is hard to imagine how a first-century scholar of Scripture could hear the parable and not think of the story of the merciful Samaritans of 2 Chronicles 28."

=== Priests and Levites ===
In Jewish culture, contact with a dead body was understood to be defiling. Priests were particularly enjoined to avoid uncleanness. The priest and Levite may therefore have assumed that the fallen traveler was dead and avoided him to keep themselves ritually clean. On the other hand, the depiction of travel downhill (from Jerusalem to Jericho) may indicate that their temple duties had already been completed, making this explanation less likely, although this is disputed. Since the Mishnah made an exception for neglected corpses, the priest and the Levite could have used the law to justify both touching a corpse or ignoring it. In any case, passing by on the other side avoided checking "whether he was dead or alive". Indeed, "it weighed more with them that he might be dead and defiling to the touch of those whose business was with holy things than that he might be alive and in need of care."

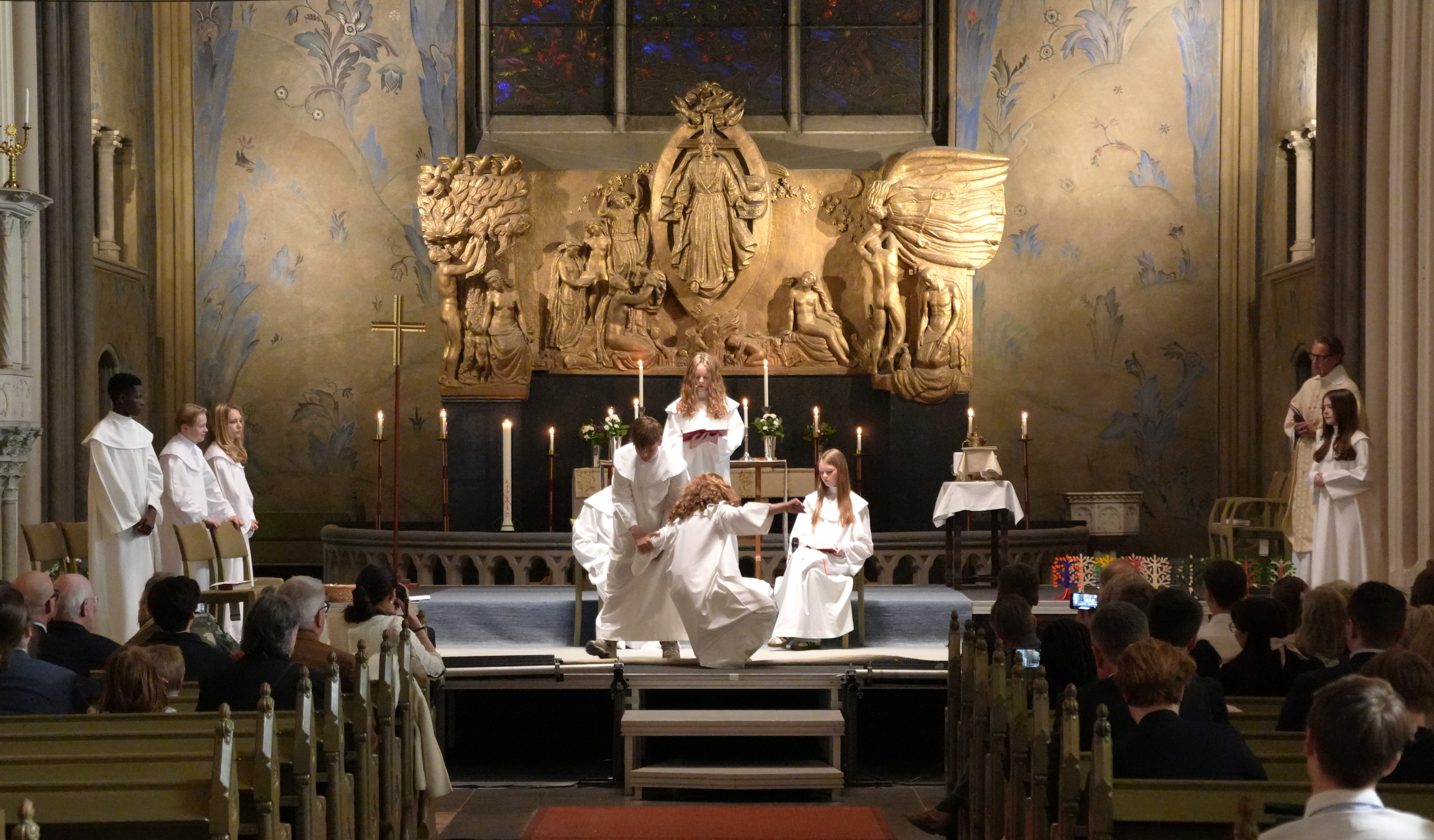
A group of Lutheran confirmands in the Church of Sweden reenact the Parable of the Good Samaritan during their confirmation mass in Oscar Church, Stockholm.

== Interpretation ==
=== Allegorical reading ===
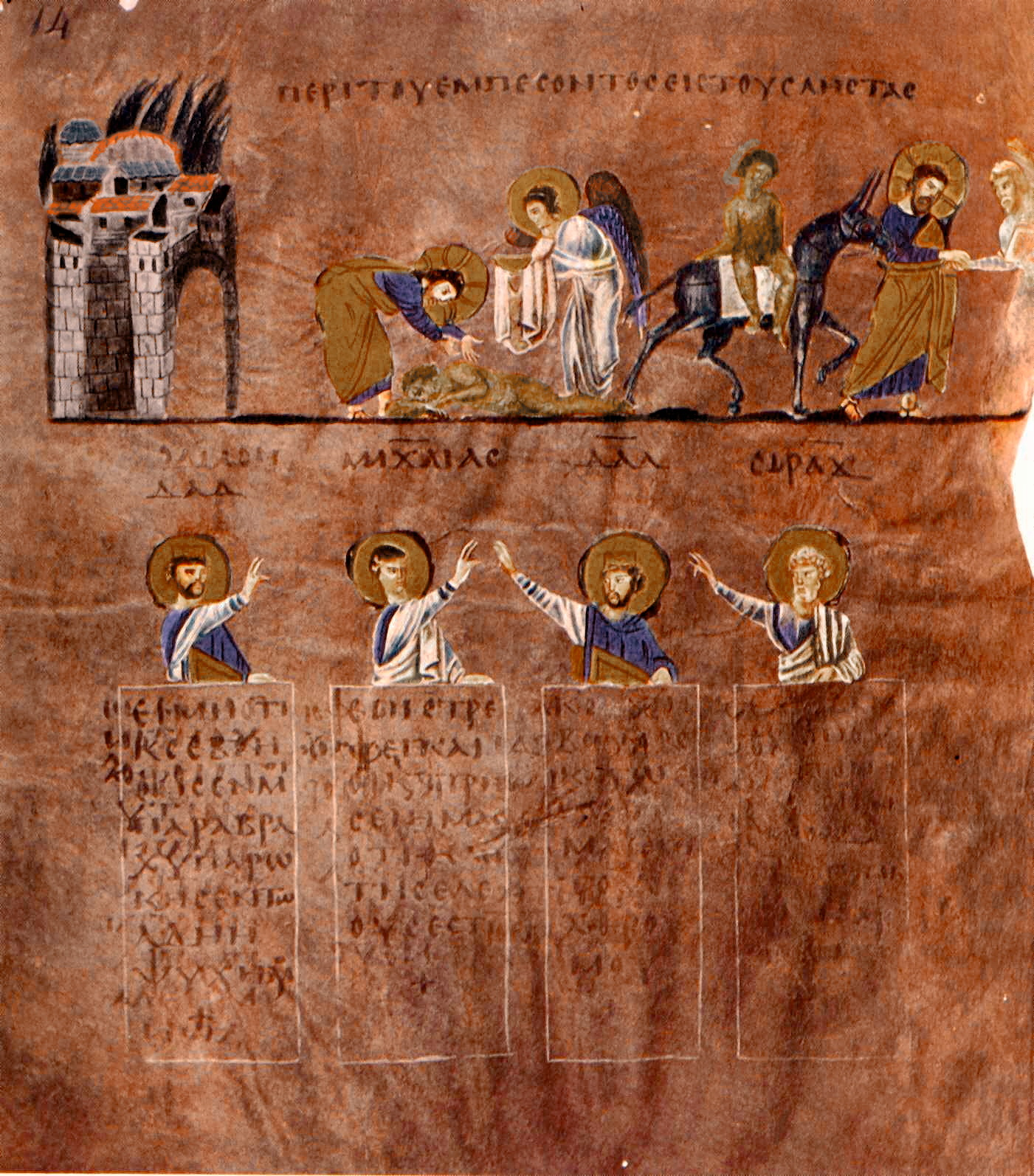
In this folio from the 6th-century Rossano Gospels, the cross-bearing halo around the Good Samaritan's head indicates an allegorical interpretation. The first scene includes an angel.

Origen described the allegory as follows:

The man who was going down is Adam. Jerusalem is paradise, and Jericho is the world. The robbers are hostile powers. The priest is the Law, the Levite is the prophets, and the Samaritan is Christ. The wounds are disobedience, the beast is the Lord's body, the [inn], which accepts all who wish to enter, is the Church. [...] The manager of the [inn] is the head of the Church, to whom its care has been entrusted. And the fact that the Samaritan promises he will return represents the Savior's second coming.

— Origen 1996, p. 136, Homily 34, para 3

John Welch further states:

This allegorical reading was taught not only by ancient followers of Jesus, but it was virtually universal throughout early Christianity, being advocated by Irenaeus, Clement, and Origen, and in the fourth and fifth centuries by Chrysostom in Constantinople, Ambrose in Milan, and Augustine in North Africa. This interpretation is found most completely in two other medieval stained-glass windows, in the French cathedrals at Bourges and Sens."

— Welch 2007, pp. 26–33

The allegorical interpretation is also traditional in the Eastern Orthodox Church. John Newton refers to the allegorical interpretation in his hymn "How Kind the Good Samaritan", which begins:

How kind the good Samaritan
To him who fell among the thieves!
Thus Jesus pities fallen man,
And heals the wounds the soul receives.

Robert Funk also suggests that Jesus' Jewish listeners were to identify with the robbed and wounded man. In his view, the help received from a hated Samaritan is like the kingdom of God received as grace from an unexpected source.

=== Ethical reading ===
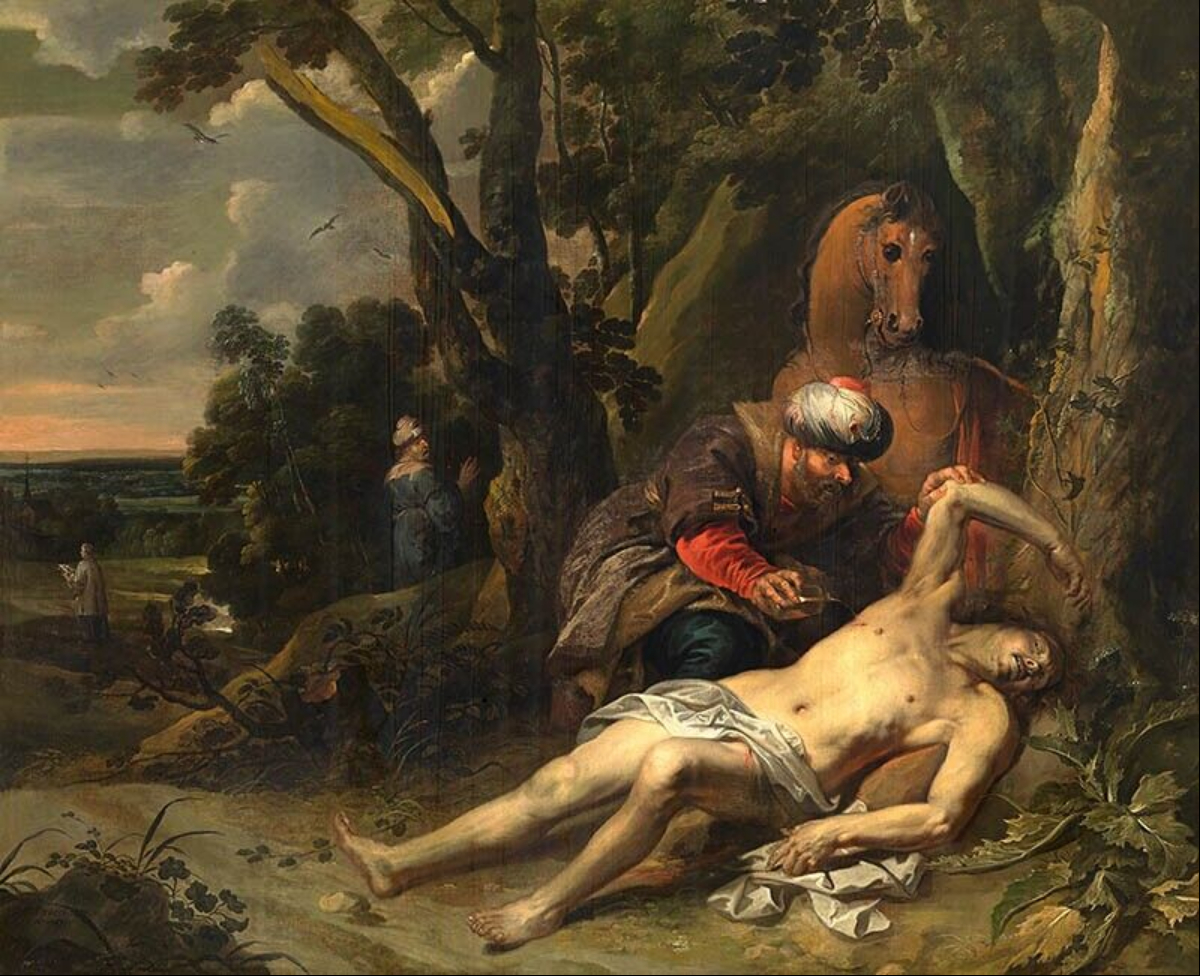
Parable of the Good Samaritan by Balthasar van Cortbemde (1647) shows the Good Samaritan tending the injured man while the Levite and priest are also shown in the distance.

John Calvin was not impressed by Origen's allegorical reading:

The allegory which is here contrived by the advocates of free will is too absurd to deserve refutation. According to them, under the figure of a wounded man is described the condition of Adam after the fall; from which they infer that the power of acting well was not wholly extinguished in him; because he is said to be only half-dead. As if it had been the design of Christ, in this passage, to speak of the corruption of human nature, and to inquire whether the wound which Satan inflicted on Adam were deadly or curable; nay, as if he had not plainly, and without a figure, declared in another passage, that all are dead, but those whom he quickens by his voice (John 5:25). As little plausibility belongs to another allegory, which, however, has been so highly satisfactory, that it has been admitted by almost universal consent, as if it had been a revelation from heaven. This Samaritan they imagine to be Christ, because he is our guardian; and they tell us that wine was poured, along with oil, into the wound, because Christ cures us by repentance and by a promise of grace. They have contrived a third subtlety, that Christ does not immediately restore health, but sends us to the Church, as an innkeeper, to be gradually cured. I acknowledge that I have no liking for any of these interpretations; but we ought to have a deeper reverence for Scripture than to reckon ourselves at liberty to disguise its natural meaning. And, indeed, any one may see that the curiosity of certain men has led them to contrive these speculations, contrary to the intention of Christ.

— Calvin 1845, p. 54

The meaning of the parable for Calvin was, instead, that "compassion, which an enemy showed to a Jew, demonstrates that the guidance and teaching of nature are sufficient to show that man was created for the sake of man. Hence it is inferred that there is a mutual obligation between all men." In other writings, Calvin pointed out that people are not born merely for themselves, but rather "mankind is knit together with a holy knot [...] we must not live for ourselves, but for our neighbors." Earlier, Cyril of Alexandria had written that "a crown of love is being twined for him who loves his neighbour."

Francis Schaeffer suggested: "Christians are not to love their believing brothers to the exclusion of their non-believing fellowmen. That is ugly. We are to have the example of the good Samaritan consciously in mind at all times."

Other modern theologians have taken similar positions. For example, G. B. Caird wrote:

Dodd quotes as a cautionary example Augustine's allegorisation of the Good Samaritan, in which the man is Adam, Jerusalem the heavenly city, Jericho the moon – the symbol of immortality; the thieves are the devil and his angels, who strip the man of immortality by persuading him to sin and so leave him (spiritually) half dead; the priest and Levite represent the Old Testament, the Samaritan Christ, the beast his flesh which he assumed at the Incarnation; the inn is the church and the innkeeper the apostle Paul. Most modern readers would agree with Dodd that this farrago bears no relationship to the real meaning of the parable.

— Caird 1980, p. 165

Joel B. Green writes that Jesus' final question (which, in something of a "twist", reverses the question originally asked):

[The question] presupposes the identification of "anyone" as a neighbor, then presses the point that such an identification opens wide the door of loving action. By leaving aside the identity of the wounded man and by portraying the Samaritan traveler as one who performs the law (and so as one whose actions are consistent with an orientation to eternal life), Jesus has nullified the worldview that gives rise to such questions as, Who is my neighbor? The purity-holiness matrix has been capsized. And, not surprisingly in the Third Gospel, neighborly love has been concretized in care for one who is, in this parable, self-evidently a social outcast

— Green 1997, p. 432

Such a reading of the parable makes it important in liberation theology, where it provides a concrete anchoring for love and indicates an "all embracing reach of solidarity." In Indian Dalit theology, it is seen as providing a "life-giving message to the marginalized Dalits and a challenging message to the non-Dalits."

Martin Luther King Jr. often spoke of this parable, contrasting the rapacious philosophy of the robbers, and the self-preserving non-involvement of the priest and Levite, with the Samaritan's coming to the aid of the man in need. King also extended the call for neighborly assistance to society at large:

On the one hand we are called to play the good Samaritan on life's roadside; but that will be only an initial act. One day we must come to see that the whole Jericho road must be transformed so that men and women will not be constantly beaten and robbed as they make their journey on life's highway. True compassion is more than flinging a coin to a beggar; it is not haphazard and superficial. It comes to see that an edifice which produces beggars needs restructuring.

— Martin Luther King Jr., "A Time to Break the Silence", quoted in Hicks & Valeri 2008, p. 31

=== Catholic view ===
Thomas Aquinas states that there are three points to be noted in this parable: Firstly, the manifold misery of sinners: "A certain man went down from Jerusalem." Secondly, is shown the manifold pity of Christ to the sinner: "A certain Samaritan, as he journeyed, came where he was; and when he saw him he had compassion on him." Thirdly, the rule which is given for imitation: "Go, and do thou likewise."

Justus Knecht gives the deeper interpretation of this parable, according to the Church Fathers, writing:

Jesus Himself is the Good Samaritan, as proved by His treatment of the robbed and wounded human race. Sin and the devil are the robbers who have despoiled man of his robe of innocence and all supernatural gifts, and grievously wounded him in his natural gifts. Thus man lay, weak, helpless, and half-dead. He still, it is true, possessed his natural life, but he had lost the supernatural life of grace, as well as the prospect of eternal life, and was powerless to raise himself from the misery of sin by any effort of his own. Neither priest nor Levite, i. e. neither sacrifice nor law of the Old Covenant, could help him, or heal his wounds; they only made him realize more fully his helpless condition. Then the Son of God, moved by compassion, came down from heaven to help poor fallen man, living at enmity with God. He healed his wounds with the wine of His Most Precious Blood and the oil of His grace, and took him to the inn, His Church. When He left this earth to return to heaven, He gave to the guardians of His Church the twofold treasure of His doctrine and His grace, and ordered them to tend the still weak man, until He Himself came back to reward every one according to his works.

=== Other interpretations ===
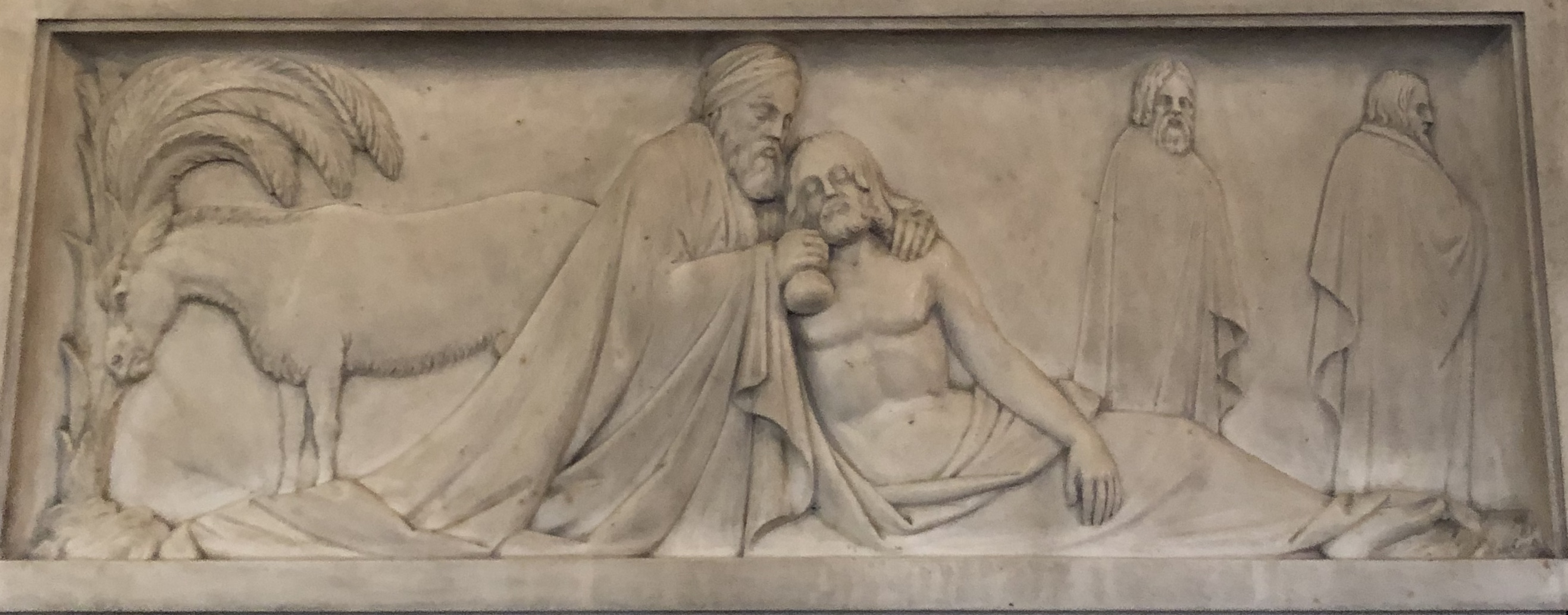
Parable of the Good Samaritan by Samuel Nixon, St. Paul's Church, Halifax, Nova Scotia

In addition to these classical interpretations many scholars have drawn additional themes from the story. Some have suggested that religious tolerance was an important message of the parable. By selecting for the moral protagonist of the story someone whose religion (Samaritanism) was despised by the Jewish audience to which Jesus was speaking, some argue that the parable attempts to downplay religious differences in favor of focusing on moral character and good works.

Others have suggested that Jesus was attempting to convey an anti-establishment message, not necessarily in the sense of rejecting authority figures in general, but in the sense of rejecting religious hypocrisy. By contrasting the noble acts of a despised religion to the crass and selfish acts of a priest and a Levite, two representatives of the Jewish religious establishment, some argue that the parable attempts to downplay the importance of status in the religious hierarchy (or the importance of knowledge of scripture) in favor of the practice of religious principles.

==== Modern Jewish view ====
The story of the good Samaritan, in the Pauline Gospel of Luke x. 25–37, related to illustrate the meaning of the word "neighbor", possesses a feature which puzzles the student of rabbinical lore. The kind Samaritan who comes to the rescue of the men that had fallen among the robbers, is contrasted with the unkind priest and Levite; whereas the third class of Jews—i.e., the ordinary Israelites who, as a rule, follow the Cohen and the Levite are omitted; and therefore suspicion is aroused regarding the original form of the story. If "Samaritan" has been substituted by the anti-Judean gospel-writer for the original "Israelite", no reflection was intended by Jesus upon Jewish teaching concerning the meaning of neighbor; and the lesson implied is that he who is in need must be the object of love.

The term "neighbor" has not at all times been thus understood by Jewish teachers. (Note: Several recognize that Leviticus 19:18 exclusively refers to the Israelitish neighbor (e.g., Stade 1888, p. 510a). This debate is reflected in the question by the Jewish Torah expert re the definition of "neighbor" in Leviticus 19:18 (Luke 10:29).) In Tanna debe Eliyahu R. xv. it is said: "Blessed be the Lord who is impartial toward all. He says: 'Thou shalt not defraud thy neighbor. Thy neighbor is like thy brother, and thy brother is like thy neighbor.'" Likewise in xxviii.: "Thou shalt love the Lord thy God"; that is, thou shalt make the name of God beloved to the creatures by a righteous conduct toward Gentiles as well as Jews (compare Sifre, Deut. 32). Aaron b. Abraham ibn Ḥayyim of the sixteenth century, in his commentary to Sifre, l.c.; Ḥayyim Vital, the cabalist, in his "Sha'are Ḳedushah", i. 5; and Moses Ḥagis of the eighteenth century, in his work on the 613 commandments, while commenting on Deut. xxiii. 7, teach alike that the law of love of the neighbor includes the non-Israelite as well as the Israelite. There is nowhere a dissenting opinion expressed by Jewish writers. For modern times, see among others the conservative opinion of Plessner's religious catechism, "Dat Mosheh we-Yehudit", p. 258.

== Authenticity ==
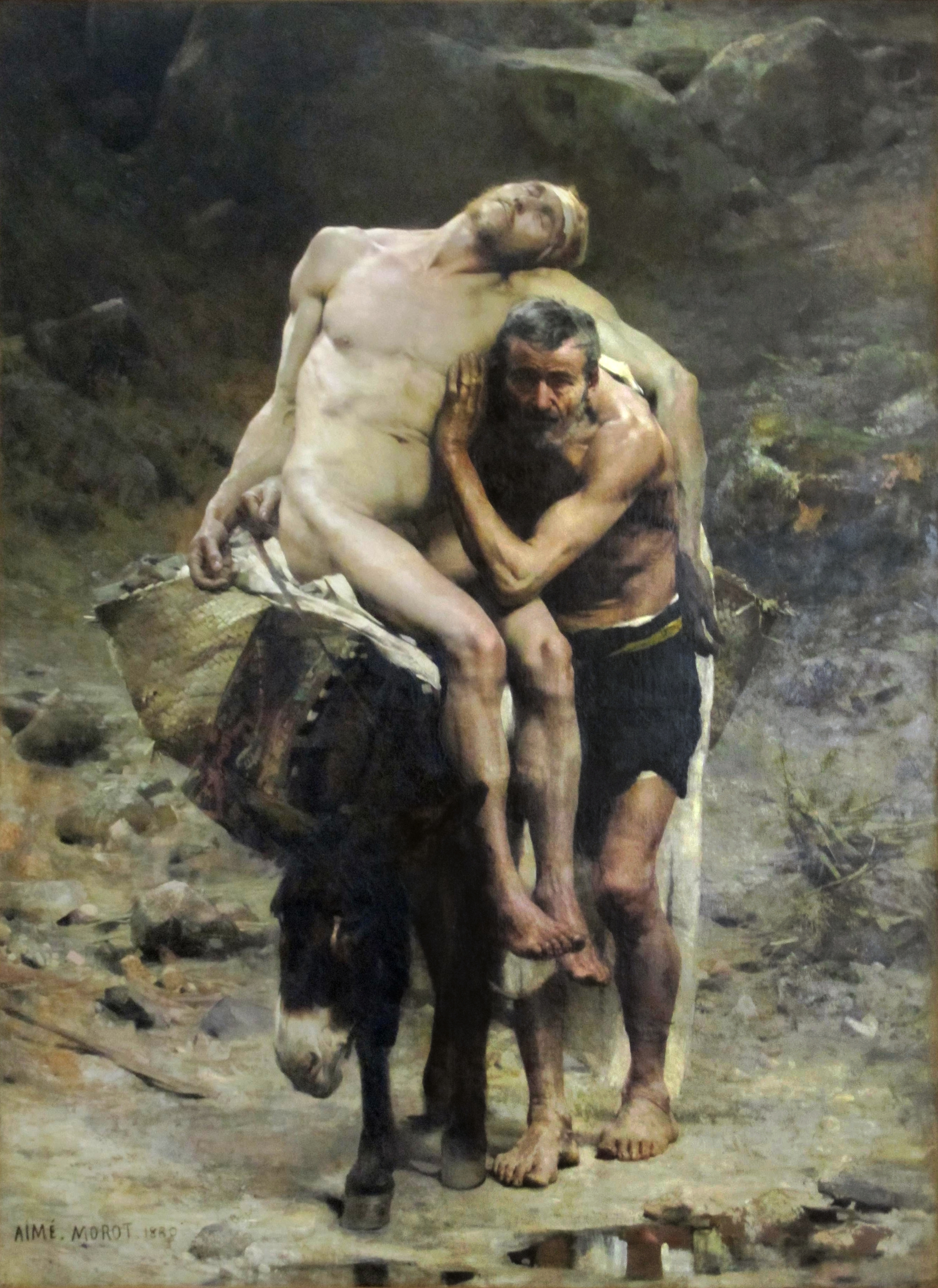
The Good Samaritan by Aimé Morot (1880) shows the Good Samaritan taking the injured man to the inn.

The Jesus Seminar voted this parable to be authentic, with 60% of fellows rating it "red" (authentic) and a further 29% rating it "pink" (probably authentic). The paradox of a disliked outsider such as a Samaritan helping a Jew is typical of Jesus' provocative parables, and is a deliberate feature of this parable. In the Greek text, the shock value of the Samaritan's appearance is enhanced by the emphatic Σαμαρίτης, Samaritēs at the beginning of the sentence in verse 33.

Bernard Brandon Scott, a member of the Jesus Seminar, questions the authenticity of the parable's context, suggesting that "the parable originally circulated separately from the question about neighborliness" and that the "existence of the lawyer's question in Mark 12:28–34 and Matthew 22:34–40, in addition to the evidence of heavy Lukan editing" indicates the parable and its context were "very probably joined editorially by Luke." A number of other commentators share this opinion, with the consensus of the Jesus Seminar being that verses Luke 10:36–37 were added by Luke to "connect with the lawyer's question." On the other hand, the "keen rabbinic interest in the question of the greatest commandment" may make this argument invalid, in that Luke may be describing a different occurrence of the question being asked. Differences between the gospels suggest that Luke is referring to a different episode from Mark and Matthew, and Klyne Snodgrass writes that "While one cannot exclude that Luke has joined two originally separate narratives, evidence for this is not convincing." The Oxford Bible Commentary notes:

That Jesus was only tested once in this way is not a necessary assumption. The twist between the lawyer's question and Jesus' answer is entirely in keeping with Jesus' radical stance: he was making the lawyer rethink his presuppositions.

— Barton & Muddiman 2001, p. 942

The unexpected appearance of the Samaritan led Joseph Halévy to suggest that the parable originally involved "a priest, a Levite, and an Israelite", in line with contemporary Jewish stories, and that Luke changed the parable to be more familiar to a gentile audience." Halévy further suggests that, in real life, it was unlikely that a Samaritan would actually have been found on the road between Jericho and Jerusalem, although others claim that there was "nothing strange about a Samaritan travelling in Jewish territory". William C. Placher points out that such debate misinterprets the biblical genre of a parable, which illustrates a moral rather than a historical point: on reading the story, "we are not inclined to check the story against the police blotter for the Jerusalem-Jericho highway patrol. We recognize that Jesus is telling a story to illustrate a moral point, and that such stories often don't claim to correspond to actual events." The traditionally understood ethical moral of the story would not hold if the parable originally followed the priest-Levite-Israelite sequence of contemporary Jewish stories, as Halévy suggested, for then it would deal strictly with intra-Israelite relations just as did the Lev 19:18 command under discussion.

== As a metaphor and name ==
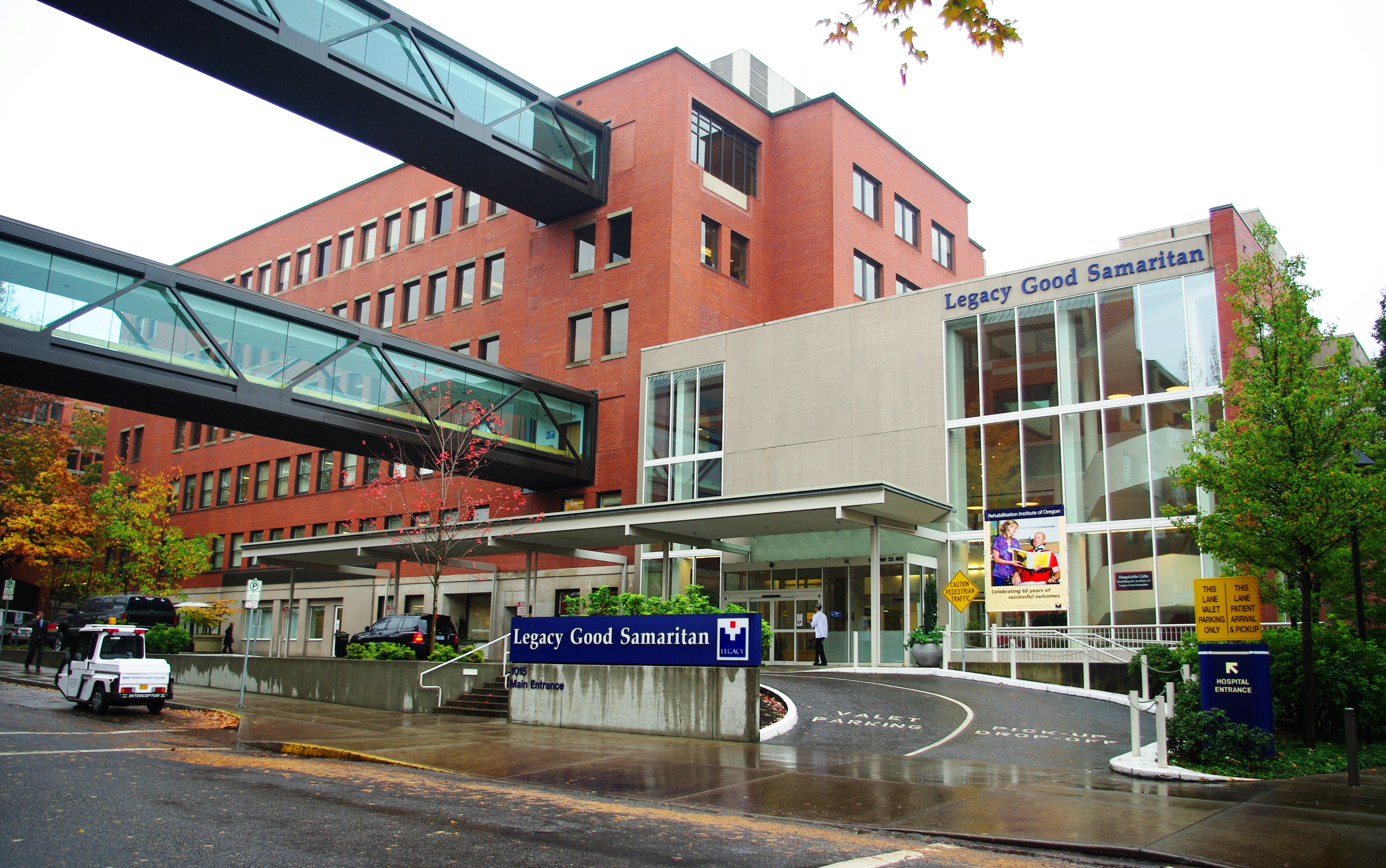
The injunction to "go and do likewise" has led to the "Good Samaritan" name being applied to many hospitals, such as the Legacy Good Samaritan Medical Center in Portland, Oregon.

The term "good Samaritan" is used as a common metaphor: "The word now applies to any charitable person, especially one who, like the man in the parable, rescues or helps out a needy stranger."

The name has consequently been used for a number of charitable organizations, including Samaritans, Samaritan's Purse, Sisters of the Good Samaritan, and The Samaritan Befrienders Hong Kong. The name Good Samaritan Hospital is used for a number of hospitals around the world. Good Samaritan laws protect those who choose to serve and tend to others who are injured or ill.

== Art and popular culture ==
The parable of the Good Samaritan was one of the most popular in medieval art. The allegorical interpretation was often illustrated, with Christ as the Good Samaritan. Accompanying angels were sometimes also shown. In some Eastern Orthodox icons of the parable, the identification of the Good Samaritan as Christ is made explicit with a halo bearing a cross.

The numerous later artistic depictions of the parable include those of Rembrandt, Jan Wijnants, Vincent van Gogh, Aimé Morot, Domenico Fetti, Johann Carl Loth, George Frederic Watts, and Giacomo Conti. Vincent van Gogh's painting captures the reverse hierarchy that is underscored in Luke's parable. Although the priest and Levite are near the top of the status hierarchy in Israel and the Samaritans near the bottom, van Gogh reverses this hierarchy in the painting.

In his essay Lost in Non-Translation, Isaac Asimov argues that to the Jews of the time there were no good Samaritans; in his view, this was half the point of the parable. As Asimov put it, we need to think of the story occurring in Alabama in 1950, with a mayor and a preacher ignoring a man who has been beaten and robbed, with the role of the Samaritan being played by a poor black sharecropper.

The story's theme is portrayed throughout Marvel's Daredevil.

The parable of the Good Samaritan is the theme for the Austrian Christian Charity commemorative coin, minted 12 March 2003. This coin shows the Good Samaritan with the wounded man, on his horse, as he takes him to an inn for medical attention. An older coin with this theme is the American "Good Samaritan Shilling" of 1652.

Australian poet Henry Lawson wrote a poem on the parable ("The Good Samaritan"), of which the third stanza reads:

He's been a fool, perhaps, and would
Have prospered had he tried,
But he was one who never could
Pass by the other side.
An honest man whom men called soft,
While laughing in their sleeves—
No doubt in business ways he oft
Had fallen amongst thieves.

— The Good Samaritan, Lawson 1906, p. 132

John Gardiner Calkins Brainard also wrote a poem on the theme.

Dramatic film adaptations of the Parable of the Good Samaritan include the short film Samaritan (2006), set in a modern context, per the literary device of the Modern Parables DVD Bible study series.

The English composer, Benjamin Britten, was commissioned to write a piece to mark the centenary of the Red Cross. His resulting work for solo voices, choir, and orchestra, Cantata Misericordium, sets a Latin text by Patrick Wilkinson that tells the parable of the Good Samaritan. It was first performed in Geneva in 1963.

In a real-life psychology experiment sometime before 1973, a number of seminary students – in a rush to teach on this parable – failed to stop to help a shabbily dressed person on the side of the road.

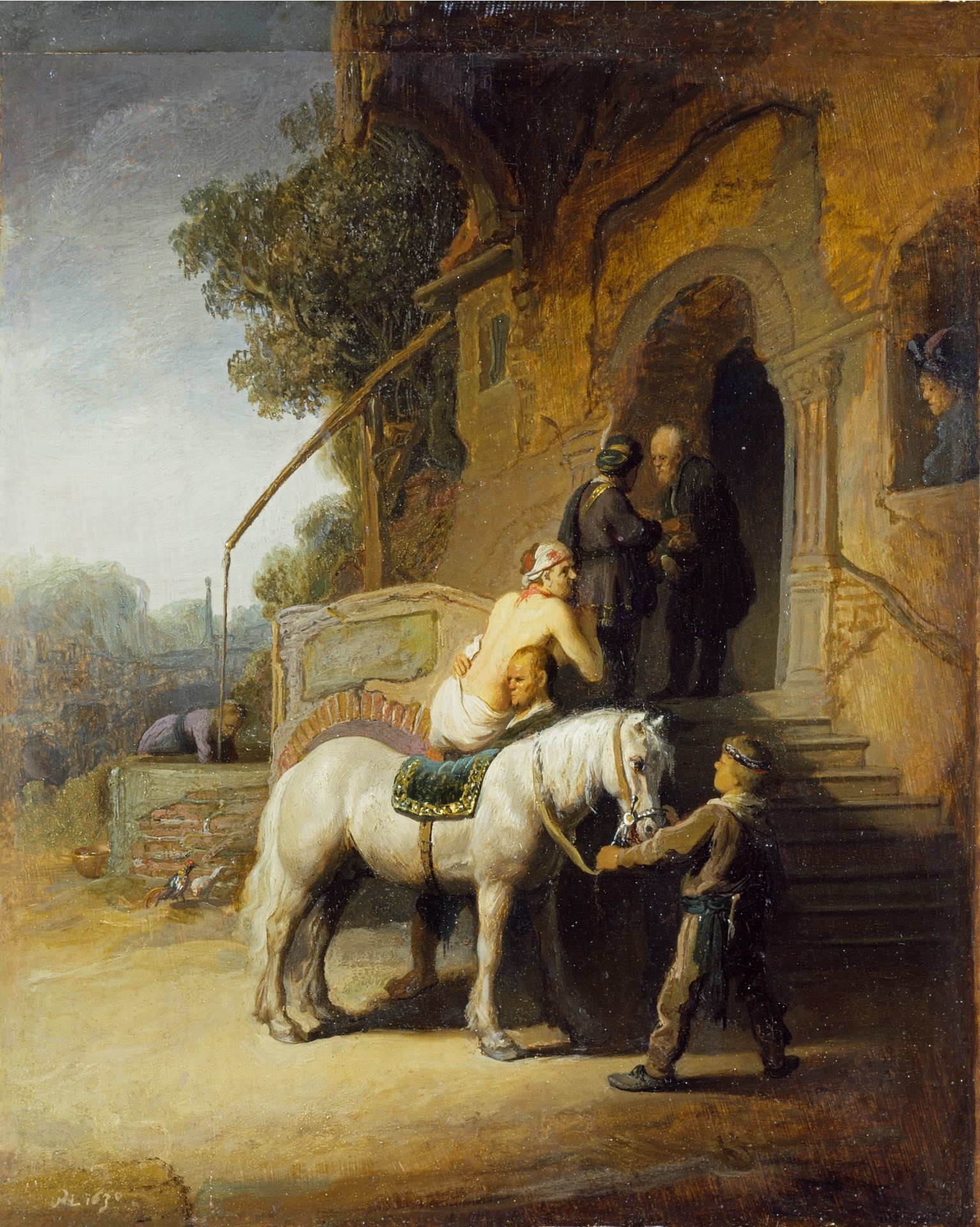
The Good Samaritan by Rembrandt (1630) shows the Good Samaritan making arrangements with the innkeeper. A later (1633) print by Rembrandt has a reversed and somewhat expanded version of the scene.

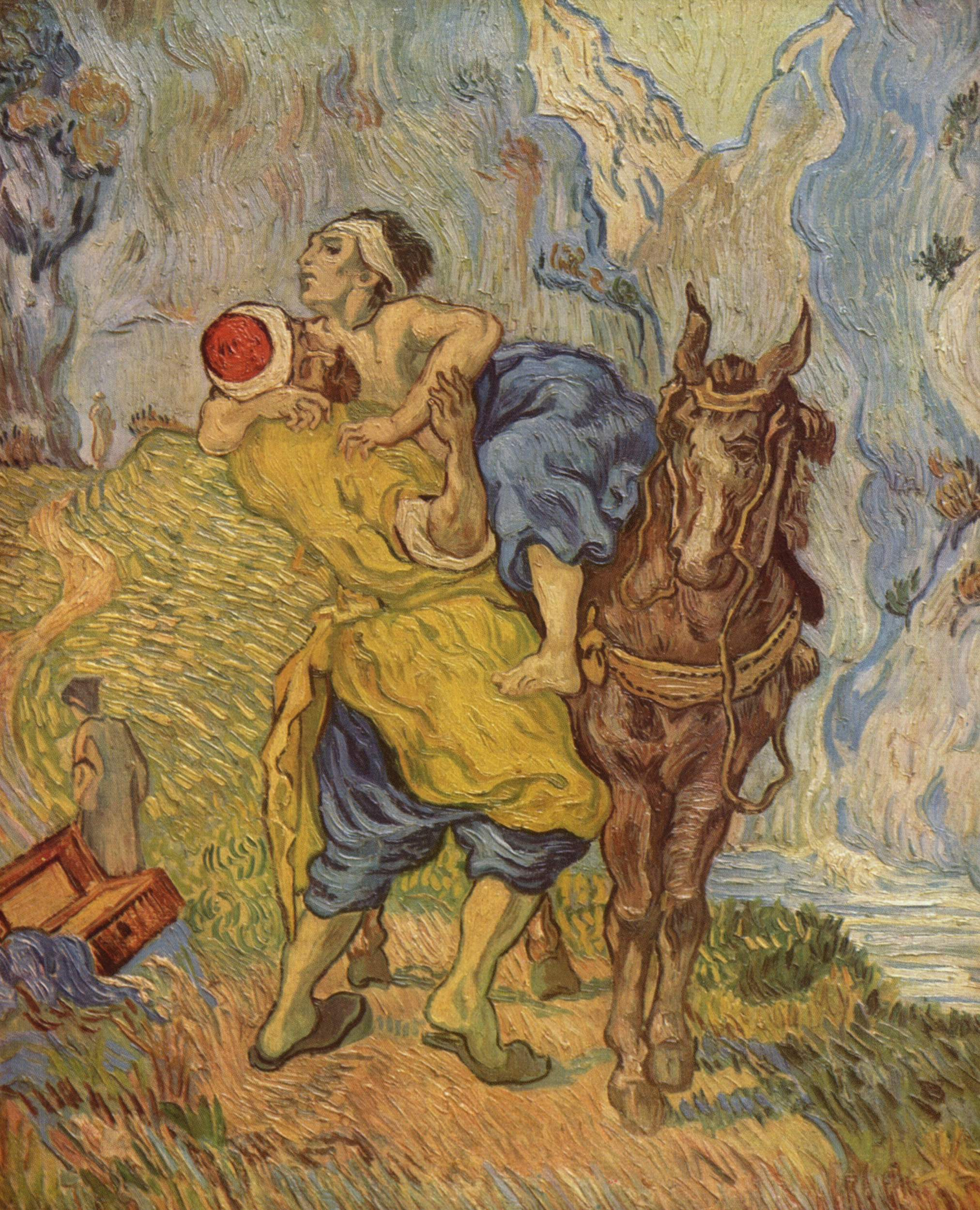
The good Samaritan, after Delacroix by Van Gogh, 1890

Christian Charity coin

== Legal presence ==
In the English law of negligence, when establishing a duty of care in Donoghue v Stevenson Lord Atkin applied the neighbour principle—drawing inspiration from the Biblical Golden Rule as in the parable of the Good Samaritan.

== See also ==
- Bystander effect
- Christian ethics
- Christian–Jewish reconciliation
- Life of Jesus in the New Testament
- Matthew 5
- Ministry of Jesus
- Samaritan's dilemma
- Good Samaritan law
