= Ex Auditu =

- Discipline: Theology
- Language: English
- Edited by: Stephen J. Chester

Publication details
- History: 1985-present
- Publisher: Wipf and Stock

Standard abbreviations
- ISO 4: Ex Auditu

Indexing
- ISSN: 0883-0053
- OCLC no.: 12032714

Links
- Journal homepage

Ex Auditu is a theological journal. It consists of a collection of papers, initially from the Frederick Neumann Symposium on Theological Interpretation of Scripture at Princeton Theological Seminary and later from the North Park Symposium on the Theological Interpretation of Scripture.

It was established as an alternative to the Journal of Biblical Literature, and focuses on the theological interpretation of Scripture.
