= Balthasar van Cortbemde =

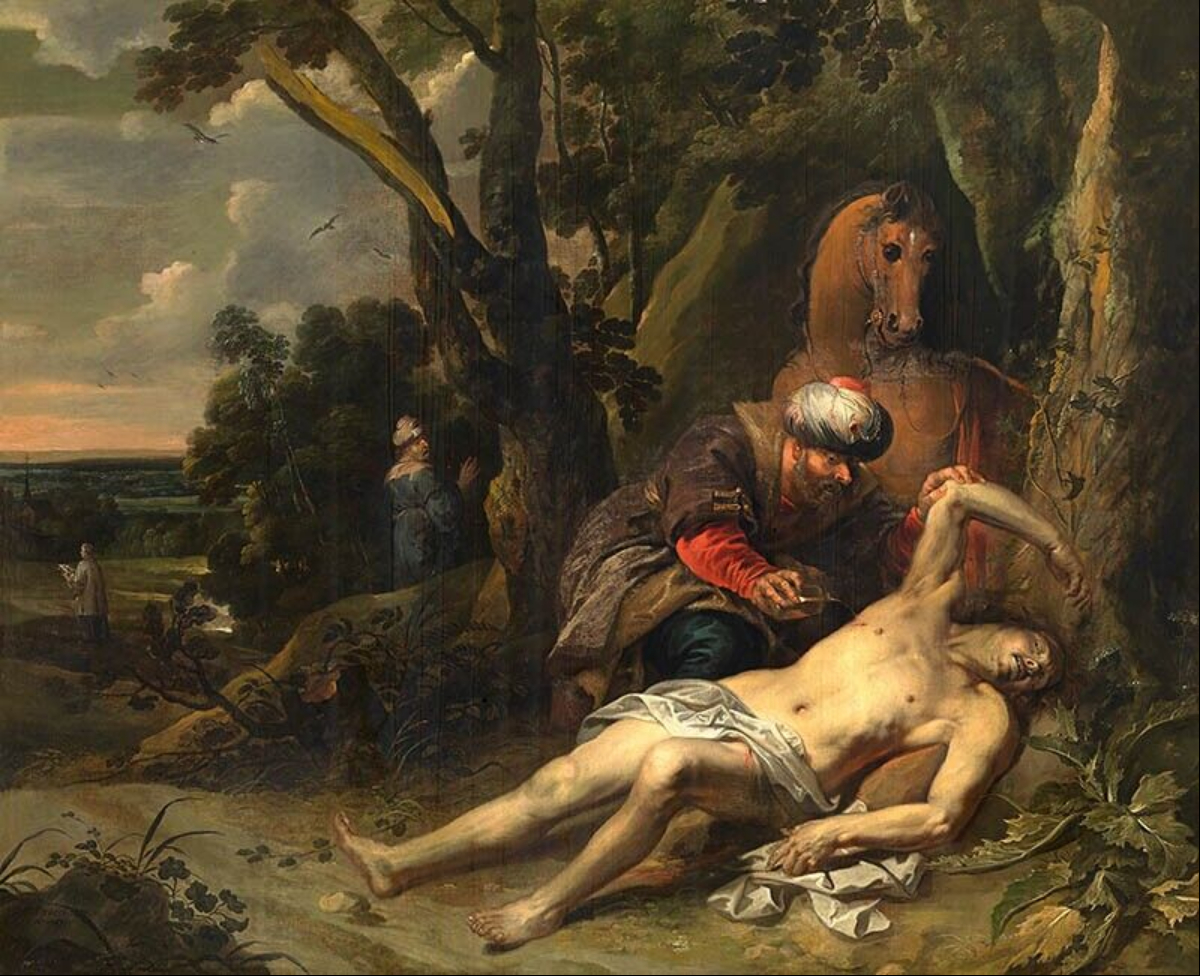
The Good Samaritan

Balthasar van Cortbemde (Antwerp, 8 April 1612 – Antwerp, prior to 24 December 1663) was a Flemish painter, copyist and art dealer. He is only known for one painting.

== Life ==
Balthasar van Cortbemde was born in Antwerp as a son of the art dealer Philips van Cortbemde and Catharine Verluyt.

He was registered as a pupil of Jan Blanckaert in 1626. He became a master of the Antwerp Guild of St Luke in 1631. On 26 March 1637 he married Ursula van Hoecke, the sister of the painter Jan van den Hoecke. The couple has six children.

Starting from 1648 he delivered paintings to the Antwerp art dealer Matthijs Musson. Amongst others, he produced copies after Anthony van Dyck. He was also active as an art dealer himself.

He received various pupils including Ingenacieus de Raet, Gloyde Verhyen, Francoys van Nuffelen, Gilam van Hoecke, Jonas Aerck and Francis Peeters.

== Work ==
Balthasar van Cortbemde is only known for one painting, The Good Samaritan dated 1647 (Royal Museum of Fine Arts Antwerp). The work was executed for the Corporation of Surgeons of Antwerp. It depicts a scene from the biblical Parable of the Good Samaritan. It shows the Samaritan traveler who has descended from his horse and is nursing the wounds of a man who was injured by robbers. According to the parable a Levite and priest had also passed the injured man without helping him. The painting shows the Levite on the left behind a tree and a little more in the distance the priest reading a book. This work shows that the artist was a talented artist.
