= Södra Vätterbygdens folkhögskola =

Swedish folk high school

Coordinates: 57°46′29″N 14°08′09″E

Södra Vätterbygdens Folkhögskola
- Type: Folk high school
- Established: 1919
- Students: About 280
- Location: Jönköping, Sweden
- Website: https://www.svf.fhsk.se/

Södra Vätterbygdens Folkhögskola (SVF) is a folk high school located in the town Jönköping, Sweden. In total it has around 300 students.

The school offers a number of study programs in different fields: bible, journalism, graphic design and music. It has a program that will ensure a gymnasium diploma in standard courses. SVF also has an exchange program, known as "the college line", with North Park University in Chicago, Illinois, with a history tracing back to 1976–1977. American students come from the U.S. to Sweden, spending the fall at SVF and the Swedish students come back with them in the spring to study at North Park University.
