= Klyne Snodgrass =

American theologian and author (born 1944)

- Born: December 28, 1944 (age 81)
- Education: Columbia Bible College

Klyne Ryland Snodgrass (born December 28, 1944) is an American theologian and author, who served as professor of New Testament Studies at the North Park Theological Seminary in Chicago, Illinois from 1974 to 2015. His publication Stories with Intent: A Comprehensive Guide to the Parables of Jesus garnered a 2009 Christianity Today Book Award.

== Early life and education ==
Snodgrass grew up in Tennessee. He earned his B.A. from Columbia Bible College, his M.Div. from Trinity Evangelical Divinity School, and his Ph.D. in 1973 from the University of St. Andrews, Scotland, where he completed a dissertation on "The Christological Stone Testimonia in the New Testament."

== Career ==
Snodgrass taught at Georgetown College in Kentucky from 1973 to 1974, when he joined the faculty of North Park Theological Seminary. From 1988 to 1993, he served as dean of faculty there, and currently holds the Paul W. Brandel Chair of New Testament Studies.

Snodgrass is ordained by the Southern Baptist Convention and has been a visiting scholar at Tyndale House, Cambridge, Southern Baptist Theological Seminary, the University of Tübingen, Princeton Theological Seminary, and Duke Divinity School.

In 2014 a Festschrift was published in his honor. Doing Theology for the Church: Essays in Honor of Klyne Snodgrass include contributions from Darrell L. Bock, Richard Longenecker, Scot McKnight, John Painter, and N. T. Wright.

== Selected publications ==
=== Articles ===
- "Exegesis and Preaching: The Principles and Practice of Exegesis". The Covenant Quarterly. 34 (3). 1976.
- "I Peter 2.1-10: Its Formation and Literary Affinities". New Testament Studies. 1978.
- "Streams of Tradition Emerging from Isaiah 40:1-5 and Their Adaptation in the New Testament". Journal for the Study of the New Testament. VIII. 1980.
- "A Biblical and Theological Basis for Women in Ministry". Covenant Ministerium of the Evangelical Covenant Church of America. 1984.
- "The task of interpreting Scripture theologically". Ex Auditu. 16. 2001.

=== Books ===
- The Parable of the Wicked Tenants: An Inquiry into Parable Interpretation (1983) ISBN 3-16-144610-0
- Ephesians in The NIV Application Commentary (1996) ISBN 0-340-67108-4
- Between Two Truths: Living with Biblical Tensions (2004) ISBN 1-59244-914-X
- Stories With Intent: A Comprehensive Guide to the Parables of Jesus (2008) ISBN 0-8028-4241-0
- Who God Says You Are: A Christian Understanding of Identity (2018) ISBN 978-0-8028-7518-1
- You Need a Better Gospel: Reclaiming the Good News of Participation with Christ (2022) ISBN 9781540965042
