= The Good Samaritan (Morot) =

Painting by Aimé Morot

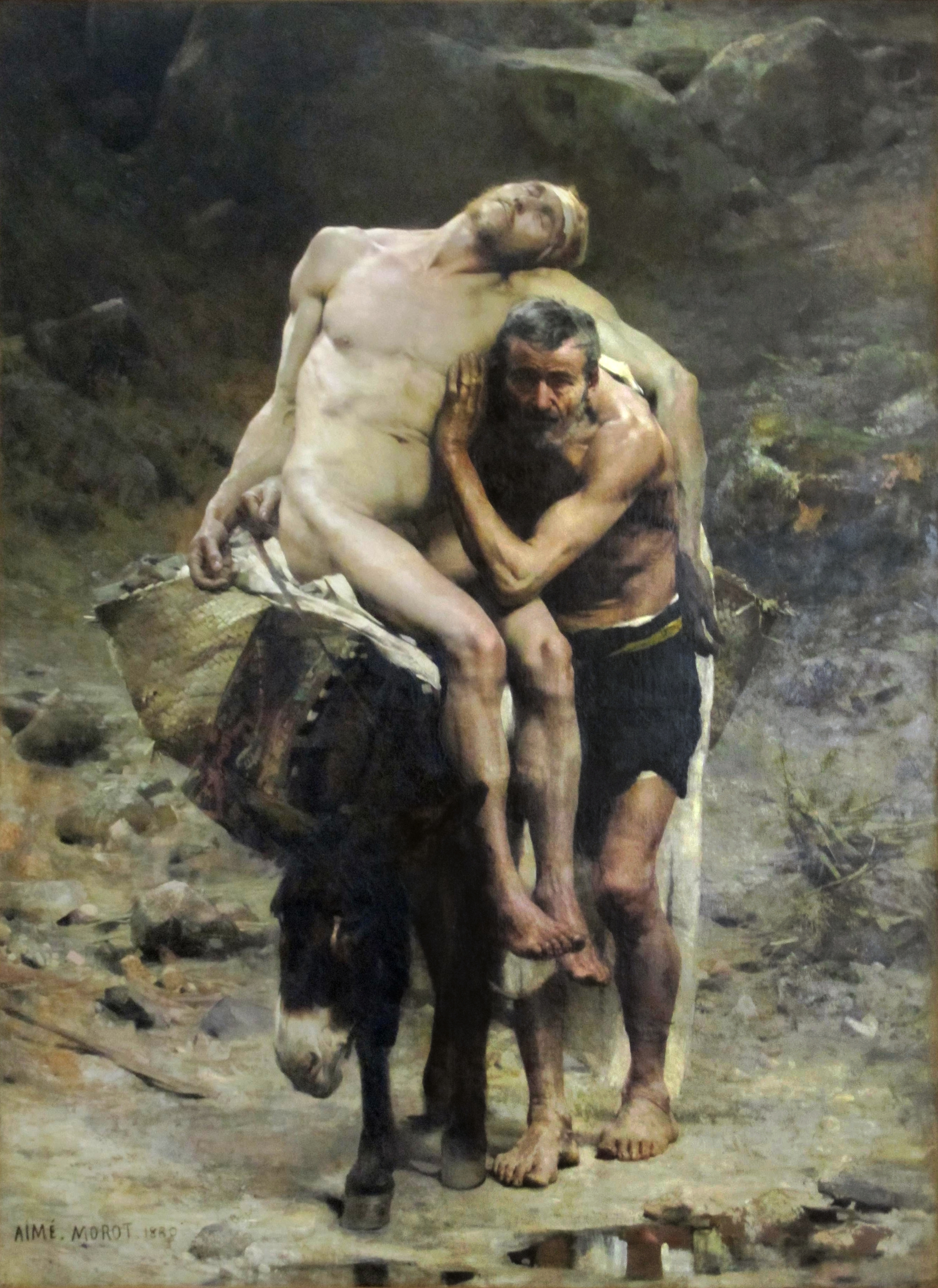
The Good Samaritan (1880) by Aimé Morot

The Good Samaritan (French: Le Bon Samaritain) is an oil in canvas painting by Aimé Morot, from 1880. Although large (268 cm x 198 cm) it was originally larger, but the artist reduced it in order to focus more directly on the life-sized figures at the centre of the composition. It was exhibited at the Salon of 1880, where it won a medal of honour.

== Subject ==
The subject of the painting is the Parable of the Good Samaritan from the Gospel of Saint Luke. The wounded man rides on the Samaritan's donkey, apparently still not conscious, while the Samaritan himself holds him up. The Samaritan, an elderly man, has a face wrinkled by age and poverty that nevertheless exudes kindness and gentleness. Heavily influenced by Spanish art of the 17th century, Morot depicted the subject with a severe realism. It was one of a number of paintings on Christian themes selected for the 1880 Salon, many of which were characterised as having anatomical precision and scientific naturalism.

== History ==
The work was acquired as a gift by the Petit Palais from Otto Klaus Preis in 1995. It was displayed as part of Illusions of reality - naturalist painting, photography and cinema 1875-1918 at the Van Gogh Museum (2010–11) and later at the Ateneum, Helsinki (2011). It also formed part of the Caritas exhibition at the Musée de Picardie in Amiens (2014–15).

== Reception ==
His vigorous and striking style was much appreciated by his contemporaries - Marie Bashkirtseff wrote in her diary: “This is the painting which has given me the most complete pleasure in my entire life. Nothing jars, everything is simple, true and good”. The Revue Alsacienne said that it was hardly possible to imagine a more successful rendering of the human body than Morot had achieved with the injured traveller. Several commentators compared Morot's work to that of Léon Bonnat, particularly in the attention both artists paid to rendering the colours and ugliness of human skin.

One criticism was that Morot had dressed the Samaritan so that he looked “like an Arab coming back from the market at Constantine. Another was that by focusing so closely on the figures, Morot's painting lacked completeness of composition, so that the complete narrative of the rendered scene could not be understood clearly.

The theme of compassion in this and several other paintings in the 1880 Salon may be related to the contemporary discussions about the rehabilitation of the Communards and the need for the Third Republic to go out if its way to redeem those who it had until recently regarded as enemies.
