= Mari Andrew =

American illustrator

- Pronunciation: Mah-ree Andrew
- Born: September 28, 1986 (age 39)
- Education: North Park University
- Occupations: Writer and illustrator
- Years active: 2015 - present

Mari Andrew is an American writer and illustrator. Her illustration career started as a hobby in 2015 when she pursued it as a form of self-expression. Andrew is a New York Times best-selling author of two books.

== Career ==
=== Books ===
Andrew's first book, Am I There Yet?: The Loop-de-loop, Zigzagging Journey to Adulthood, was published by Clarkson Potter on March 27, 2018. Getting There, a guided workbook and companion to Am I There Yet?, followed in April 2019. She has since released her second novel of essays and illustrations, My Inner Sky, published by Penguin Random House on March 2, 2021.

Am I There Yet? received global praise and was recognized on the 2018 New York Times Best Sellers list. Rachel Brosnahan will be producing Mari Andrew's Am I There Yet? as a comedy series through Amazon Studios. The series is written by screenwriter Camilla Blackett, and produced by Alexandrea Zimbler Smith, Paige Simpson, Brosnahan, and Andrew herself.

Andrew's career also includes a series of book tours and workshops on "creativity, healing, and personal resilience". Such workshops on writing and illustration are organized through Skillshare.
