= North Park University =

Christian university in Chicago, Illinois, US

Coordinates: 41.9752°N 87.7098°W

- Former names: North Park Theological Seminary (1891–1894); North Park Junior College (1894–1958); North Park College (1958–1997)
- Motto: "In Thy Light Shall We See Light" "Preparing Students for Lives of Significance and Service"
- Type: Private university
- Established: 1891; 135 years ago
- Accreditation: HLC
- Religious affiliation: Evangelical Covenant Church
- Endowment: $113.6 million (2025)
- President: Mary K. Surridge
- Faculty: 125 full-time
- Students: 2,624 (Fall 2023)
- Undergraduates: 1,877 (Fall 2023)
- Postgraduates: 747 (Fall 2023)
- Location: Chicago, Illinois, United States
- Campus: 33 acres (0.13 km^{2}); Large city
- Other campuses: Grayslake
- Colors: Blue and yellow
- Nickname: Vikings
- Sporting affiliations: NCAA Division III – CCIW
- Mascot: Ragnar
- Website: northpark.edu
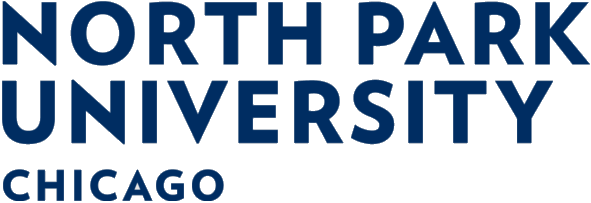

North Park University is a private Christian university in Chicago, Illinois, United States. It was founded in 1891 by the Evangelical Covenant Church. It is located on Chicago's north side in the North Park community area and enrolls more than 2,600 undergraduate and graduate students.

== History ==
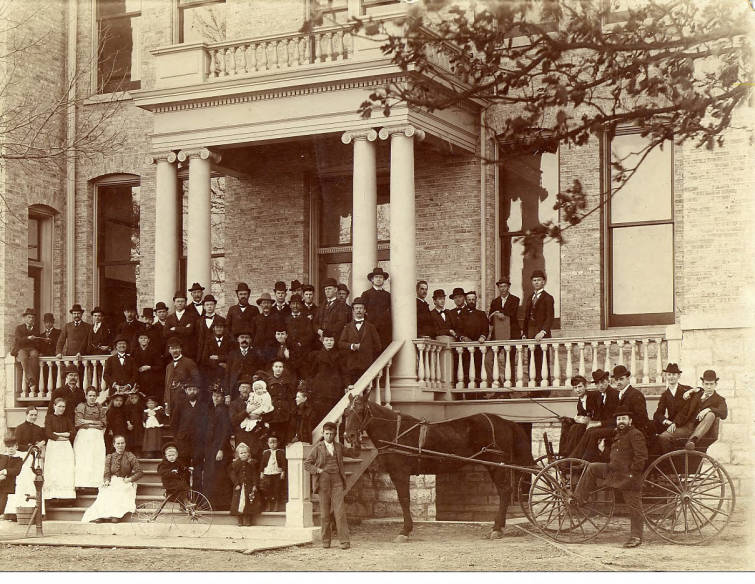
North Park Junior College students and faculty gathered in front of Old Main c. 1894

The university originated in the founding of North Park Theological Seminary in 1891 by the Evangelical Covenant Church in Minneapolis. In 1894, the school moved to Chicago and opened as "North Park College", to its present location at the corner of Foster and Kedzie. Although far from the Loop, the location was close to then existing Swedish-American villages and the newly established Swedish Covenant Hospital. Old Main, the oldest building on campus, was erected and dedicated on June 16, 1894. It is at this time that the name North Park was first used to describe the school.

Struggles and success marked the early years of North Park; enrollment and funding fluctuated significantly. An interesting source of both money and headache came from P. H. Anderson, who was serving as a Covenant missionary in Alaska at the time. When he made a small fortune during the gold rush, he donated a significant portion of the windfall to North Park. However, the money was considered tainted by some of North Park's leadership, who thought the money was of dubious origin.

A leader at that time was David Nyvall. Nyvall served as president and teacher in the Seminary for many years. The current seminary building, Nyvall Hall, is named after him.

Since the early days, the school has developed and changed in many ways. In 1958, North Park Junior College expanded from a two-year college into a four-year program, becoming North Park College. In 1997, the decision was made to change the name of the school again, and North Park University was born. Though North Park still holds on to its Swedish American past and close ties with the Evangelical Covenant Church, it is now an intercultural institution focused on diversity. North Park describes itself as a liberal arts university that is Christian, city-centered, and intercultural. North Park University is accredited by the North Central Association of Colleges and Schools and the Higher Learning Commission. It is also a designated Hispanic-serving institution. The seminary is additionally accredited by the Association of Theological Schools in the United States and Canada. North Park's last president, David L. Parkyn, retired at the end of the 2016–2017 academic year. Carl E. Balsam was named as the interim president in June 2017, and served until August 2018. Mary Surridge was nominated as the school's tenth president, and began her term in August 2018.

== Academics ==
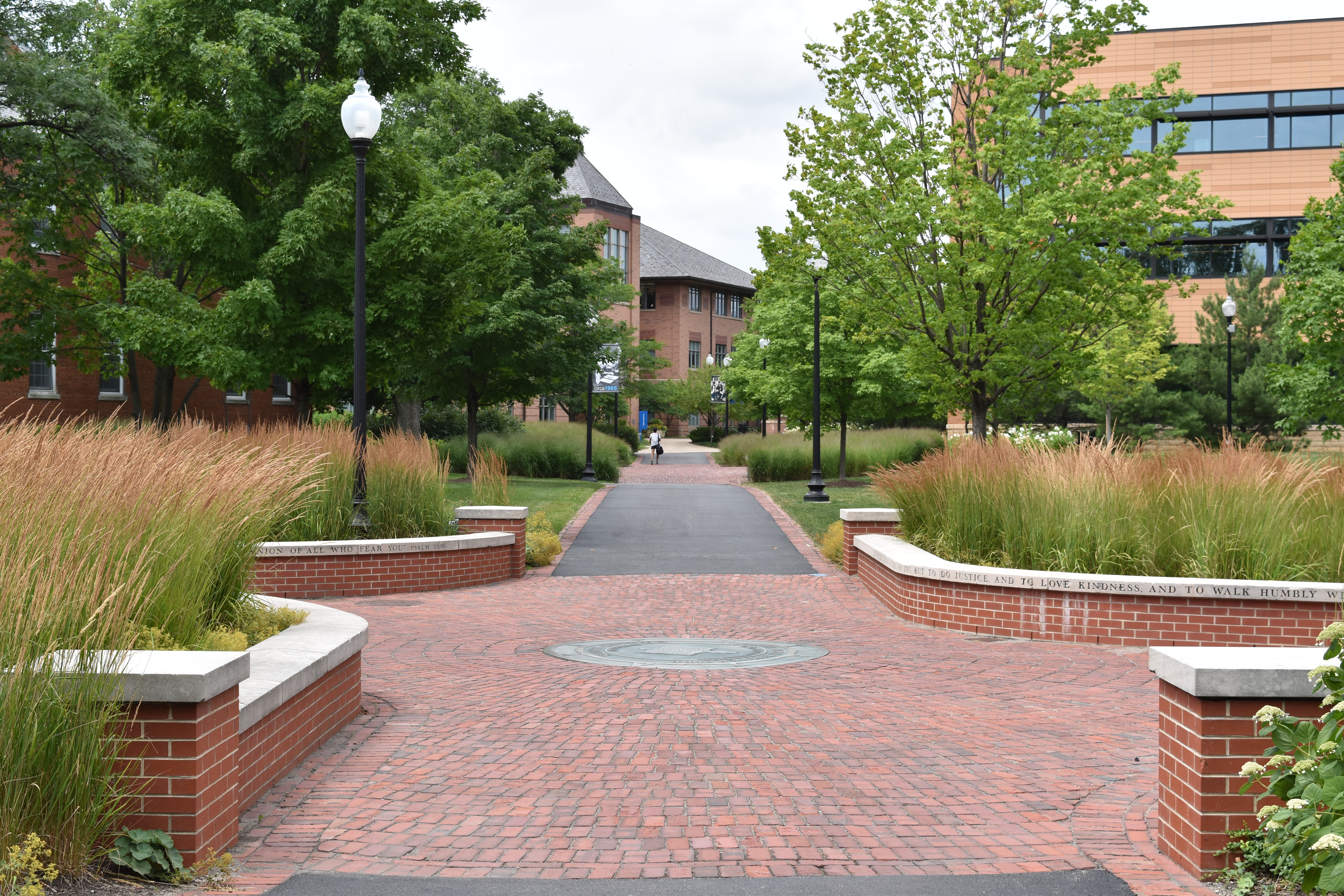
The Quad at the center of North Park's campus. The building in the distance is Brandel Library

The university is organized into the following academic units:

- College of Arts and Sciences
- School of Business and Nonprofit Management
- School of Education
- School of Nursing and Health Sciences
- School of Professional Studies
- North Park Theological Seminary

It offers undergraduate and graduate degrees. Its most popular undergraduate majors, based on number out of 365 graduates in 2022, were:

- Business Administration and Management (93)
- Registered Nursing/Registered Nurse (64)
- Sports, Kinesiology, and Physical Education/Fitness (34)
- Psychology (30)

== Athletics ==
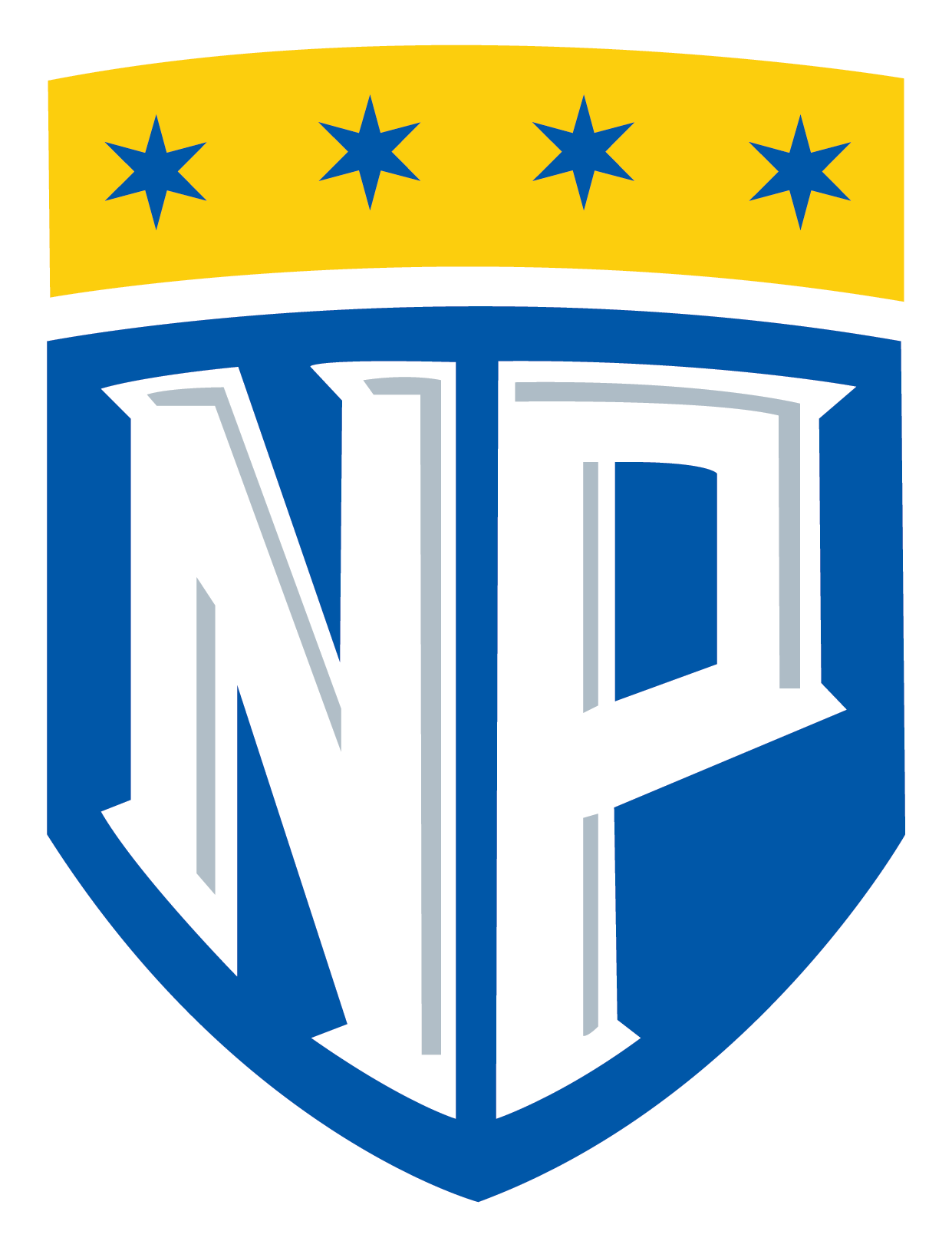
North Park athletics logo

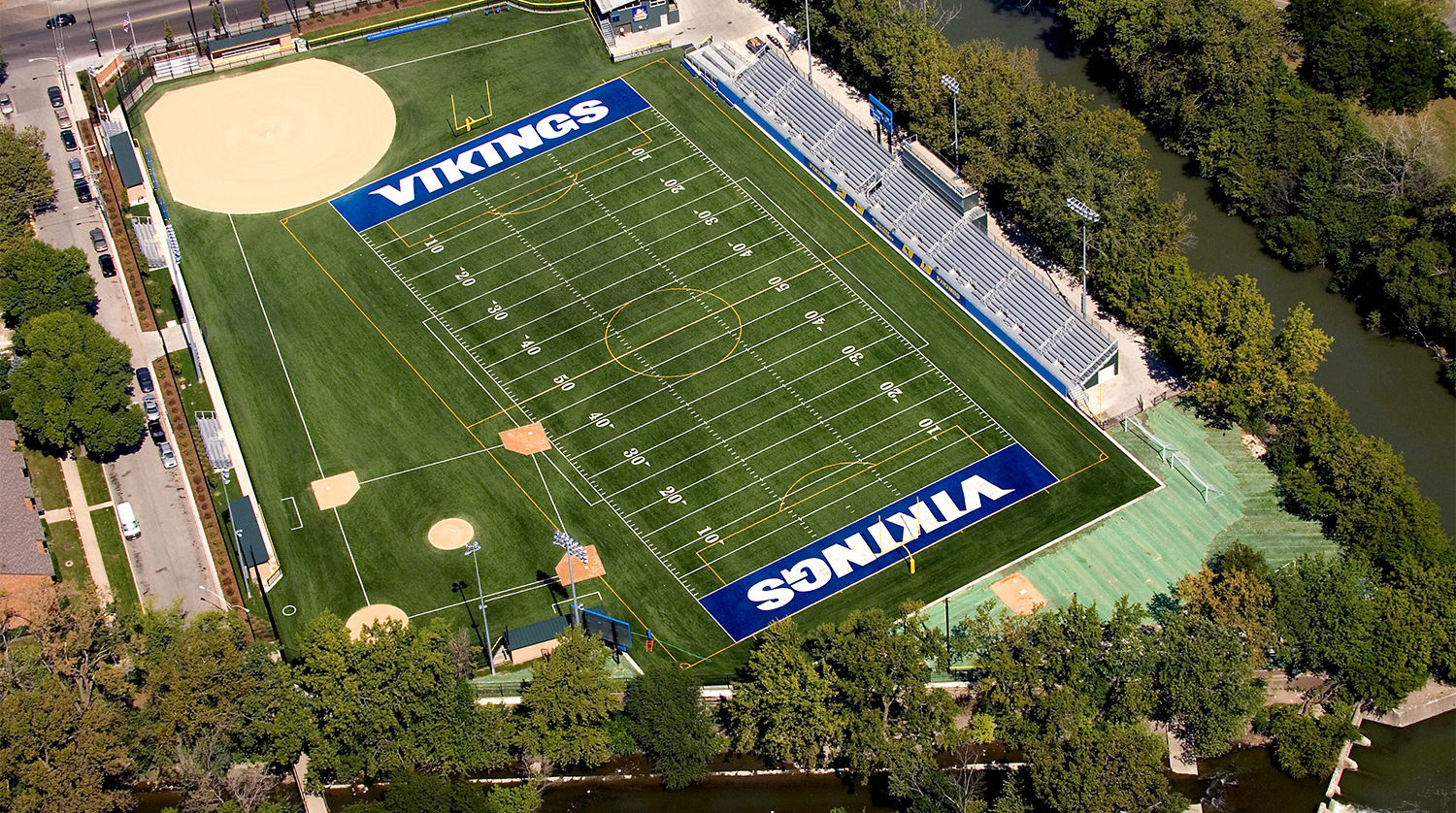
Holmgren Athletic Complex, named after Super Bowl XXXI champion head coach Mike Holmgren and his family who supported the university through the development of the $4 million project completed in 2004.

The North Park athletic teams are called the Vikings. The university is a member of the Division III level of the National Collegiate Athletic Association (NCAA), primarily competing in the College Conference of Illinois and Wisconsin (CCIW) since the 1962–63 academic year. The Vikings previously competed in the Chicagoland Collegiate Athletic Conference (CCAC) of the National Association of Intercollegiate Athletics (NAIA) from 1959–60 to 1961–62.

North Park competes in 19 intercollegiate varsity sports: Men's sports include baseball, basketball, cross country, football, golf, soccer, indoor and outdoor track and field and volleyball; while women's sports include basketball, cross country, rowing, soccer, softball, tennis, indoor and outdoor track and field and volleyball. In January 2023, North Park introduced its first esports team, a co-ed intercollegiate sport that competes in the National Esports Collegiate Conference (NECC).

=== Men's basketball ===
North Park has had a successful men's basketball program. It has won five men's NCAA Men's Division III Basketball Championships since 1978, including three consecutive ones led by Michael Harper, who later played for the NBA's Portland Trail Blazers. In the 2022–23 season, North Park advanced to the NCAA Sweet Sixteen under first-year and current head coach Sean Smith, going 24-6 (13–3 in CCIW Conference play). Coach Smith also won Conference Coach of the Year, as well as NCAA Division III National Coach of the Year.

=== Men's track and field ===
North Park's Dave Valentine won the 1983 NCAA Men's Division III Outdoor Track and Field Championship in the 10,000 meters setting a Division III National Championship record held from 1983 to 1994 and setting school records in the Indoor 2 mile, 3 mile and 5,000 meters in addition to the Outdoor 5,000 meters, 10,000 meters and Marathon.

=== Men's soccer ===
North Park men's soccer ended their 2017 season with a record of 20–2–2, finishing runner-up for the National Championship title. Their decorated season included a CCIW Championship, CCIW Tournament Championship, victories all the way to the NCAA Championship game, seven All-CCIW picks (including Newcomer and Player of the Year), four All-Region picks, a First Team All American selection, and a plethora of awards for Head Coach John Born: National Coach of the Year, Regional Coach of the Year, and CCIW Coach of the Year. The team is currently coached by North Park soccer alum Kris Grahn.

=== Baseball ===
North Park's baseball team is the six-time CCIW regular season champions, most recently winning in 2012. The Vikings have made the NCAA Division III tournament 18 times (five consecutive) and won the conference tournament thrice. The baseball team has made the NCAA tournament six times, most recently in 2012.

Two Vikings have been drafted by MLB teams: Randy Ross (15th round of the 1983 draft by the Los Angeles Dodgers) and Mike Giovenco (14th round by the Kansas City Royals). The Vikings also boast five Rawlings Gold Glove Award winners.

=== Women's volleyball ===
In 2022, Coach Michael Sopocy led the Vikings to the program's first-ever CCIW Tournament Championship. North Park defeated top-seeded tournament host Carthage College 3–1 to earn an automatic bid to the 2022 NCAA Division III tournament.

=== Club sports and intramurals ===
North Park fields club teams for men's and women's ultimate frisbee and men's volleyball. There is also a healthy Intramural sports program on campus.

=== National championships ===
Men's basketball: 1978, 1979, 1980, 1985, 1987

Men's track & field: 1983 10,000 meters

== Student Government Association ==
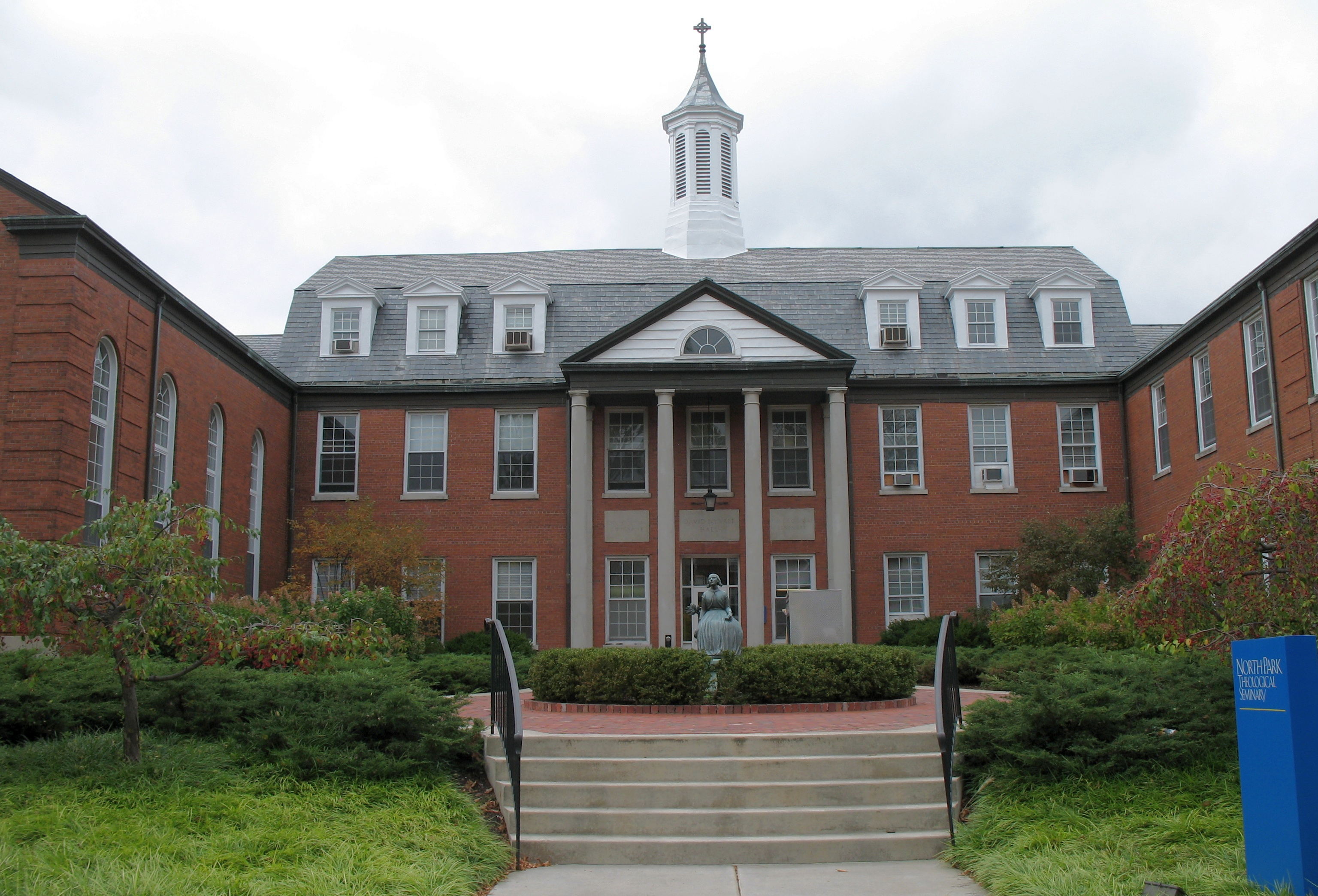
Nyvall Hall

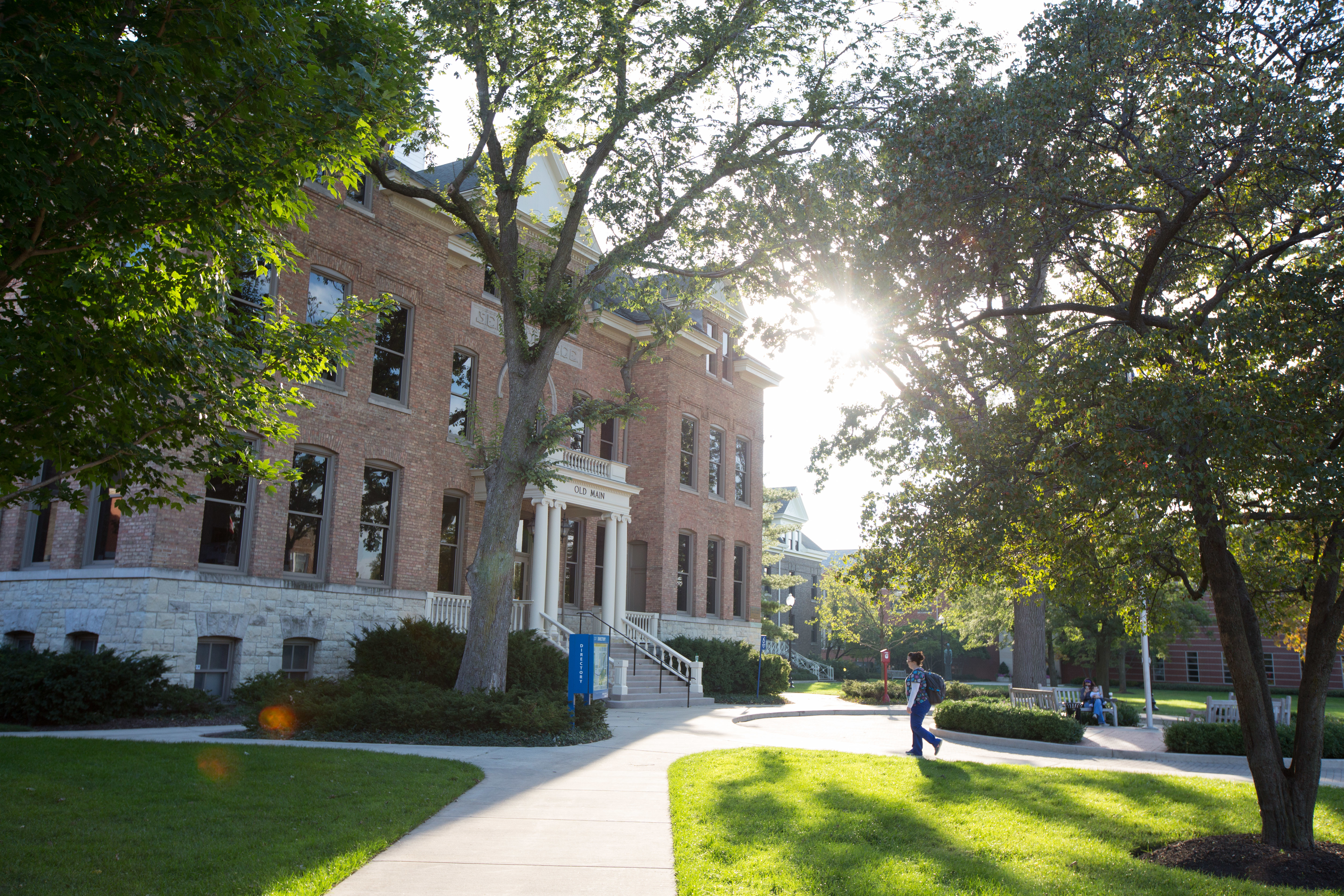
Old Main

The North Park Student Government Association (SGA) sponsors many student-led organizations on campus. Some of these include Women in STEM, the Black Student Union, and the Christian Students Organization.

=== Johnson Center for Science and Community Life ===
The Nancy and G. Timothy Johnson Center for Science and Community Life was opened in September 2014. The expansion cost $57 million largely funded by Nancy and G. Timothy Johnson in a capital campaign named "Campaign North Park". The Johnson Center is a state-of-the-art addition to North Park University's science programs and is home to 1891 Bread Co. The Johnson Center has 101,000 square feet, three floors and a garden level and is located in the central area of campus. Equipped with 30 science laboratories, the building is a space for student and faculty research, "smart" technology in every classroom, and several conference rooms. The Johnson Center is also dedicated to campus community life with a two-story atrium and lobby for gathering and social interaction, offices for programs supporting co-curricular learning, spiritual growth, vocational development, urban engagement, and campus life. The building is also equipped with communal study spaces, a prayer room, and a courtyard.

== Swedish-American traditions ==
North Park University's Brandel Library administers the Swedish-American Historical Society Archives in Chicago. The Center for Scandinavian Studies at North Park is the legal trustee. The Saint Lucy's Day festival is held each December in Anderson Chapel. The service follows many Swedish traditions and is one of the few Santa Lucia Festivals held in the Chicago area. The university has an student exchange program with Södra Vätterbygdens Folkhögskola and Jönköping University in Jönköping, Sweden.

== Notable alumni ==
- Bill Anderson, American football player and coach
- Mari Andrew, writer and illustrator
- Roy Applequist, Kansas agriculture manufacturing company founder
- Del Barber, singer-songwriter and musician
- Paul Carlson, American missionary killed in Congo in 1964
- Gordon Edes, sportswriter and team historian of the Boston Red Sox
- Kathryn Edin, academic and author
- Raymond Ericson, music critic
- Nancy Faust, organist
- Stephen T. Franklin, theologian
- Anita Gustafson, historian and president of Presbyterian College
- G. Timothy Johnson, medical journalist
- Mike Harper, basketball player
- Carl Hawkinson, state legislator
- Paul J. Marwin, politician
- James R. Thompson, former governor of Illinois
- Arthur W. Wermuth, "One-Man Army of Bataan," United States Army Officer
- Paul Zaeske, American football player
- TimTheTatman, formally known as Timothy Betar, YouTube streamer and internet personality
- Greg Dolezal, politician and Georgia State Senator for the 27th district in Cumming, Georgia
