= Carl August Björk =

Swedish preacher (1837–1916)

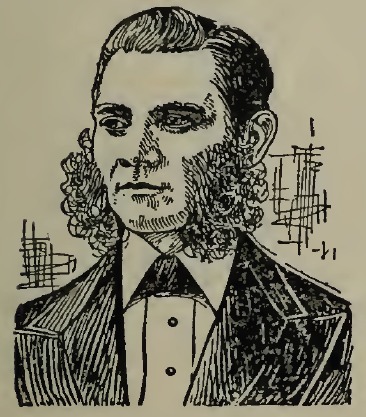
- Carl August Björk, from Missionsvännerna i Amerika
- Born: 27 July 1837; Lommaryd, Jönköping County, Sweden
- Died: 29 October 1916 (aged 79); Chicago, Illinois, U.S.
- Other names: C. A. Björk
- Occupation: Pastor
- Known for: Founding the Mission Friends
- Title: President of the Swedish Evangelical Mission Covenant Synod
- Spouse: Johanna Christina Boman (m. 1866; died 1876) Augusta Peterson (m. 1878)
- Children: 8

Carl August Björk (27 July 1837 – 29 October 1916) was a Swedish missionary preacher in the Midwestern United States. He was the founder of the Mission Friends – some of which later developed into the Evangelical Covenant Church, a Radical Pietistic Christian denomination with Lutheran roots, which he played a key role in founding. Björk served as the first president of the Swedish Evangelical Mission Covenant Synod.

== Biography ==
=== Background and preaching ===
Carl August Björk was born in Lommaryd, Jönköping County, Sweden. He was originally a shoemaker by trade but later became a soldier. In 1862, however, he had begun reading Carl Olof Rosenius' publication Pietisten, which led him to faith. He then left soldiering behind and emigrated to the United States in 1864. There he ended up in the Swedish colony of Swede Bend in Hamilton County, Iowa. He joined the local Augustana Lutheran congregation early on and preached with the encouragement of pastor Magnus Håkanson. He often read aloud from Pietisten but eventually began giving his own sermons, leading to somewhat of a revival. After Håkanson's retirement, C. J. Malmberg took over as pastor, and took a different view of Björk's revivalism, seeing it as "dangerous and schismatic". Björk, however, was dissatisfied with what he saw as the church's lack of religiosity. Soon he began holding his own prayer meetings at home. The pastor tried to brand Björk as an apostate, but this only increased his popularity and led to the creation of a mission society with Björk as its leader on 4 July 1868. His goal was reformation in the church, but it would soon lead to a new denomination.

Similar movements also existed elsewhere in Swedish-American towns, and during the 1870s they came together to form what was to become the Mission Friends. They studied Luther and Rosenius to determine who had the authority to perform ordinations, and after Johan Magnus (J. M.) Sanngren had been ordained by Charles Anderson from the Lutheran Synod of Northern Illinois, Björk was ordained by Sanngren in 1870.

In 1877, Björk became a pastor of the North Side Mission Church in Chicago, succeeding Sanngren and working there for seventeen years. His sermons, focusing on "salvation by unmerited grace through Christ alone", were described by his friend and later Covenant president Erik Gustaf Hjerpe, as "gripping and lucid".

He became the first president of the Swedish Evangelical Mission Covenant Synod upon its founding in 1885. Björk served until 1910, taking on the position full-time in 1895.

Björk died in Chicago in 1916. A monument was erected in his honor at the Swede Bend Covenant Church in 1937.

=== Family ===
Björk married Johanna Christina Boman in 1866; together they had four children: Ida, Selma, Albert, and Victor. After her death in 1876, he married Augusta Peterson, and together they had children August, Teresia, David, and Carl.

== See also ==
- Evangelical Covenant Church
- Evangelical Free Church of America – related church
