= Evangelical Covenant Church =

North American Christian denomination

- Abbreviation: ECC
- Classification: Protestant
- Orientation: Evangelical
- Theology: Radical Pietism
- Polity: Congregational
- Region: United States, Canada
- Origin: 1885; Chicago, Illinois
- Separated from: Lutheranism
- Branched from: Mission Friends
- Congregations: 878
- Members: 129,015
- Official website: covchurch.org

The Evangelical Covenant Church (ECC) is an evangelical Christian denomination with Pietist roots. The denomination has 129,015 members in 878 congregations and an average worship attendance of 219,000 people in the United States and Canada with ministries on five continents.

== Background ==
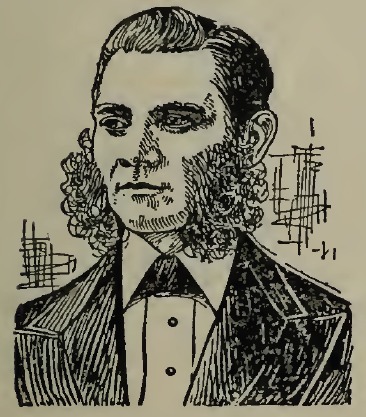
The founder of the Evangelical Covenant Church of America, Carl August Björk

The Evangelical Covenant Church's background is in free-church Swedish immigrants known as Mission Friends who had broken off from the Lutheran Church of Sweden. They formed a mission society and in the 1880s, meetings were held to determine whether or not to form a union of mission churches. The majority joined together, forming the Swedish Evangelical Mission Covenant of America (now ECC) on February 20, 1885, in Chicago, Illinois. A smaller percentage known as the Free Friends remained independent and became the Swedish Evangelical Free Church, now part of the Evangelical Free Church of America.

A pietistic religious awakening had swept through Sweden around the middle of the 19th century. Before leaving their homeland some Swedes met in people's homes, as they felt the state church was becoming overly powerful. There they conducted private services (conventicles), including hymn singing accompanied by guitars, and read scripture from their Bibles, but they were sometimes interrupted by church officials, who wanted to keep them in congregations at church. The Conventicle Act, in effect until 1858, prevented them from holding private religious gatherings. This reinforced their yearning to be in a church where they could worship freely. With this awakening and reformation came the Swedish Mission Church in 1878. The state church discouraged the gathering of these believers.

People from this movement emigrated to North America, where they formed the Swedish Evangelical Mission Covenant of America. Early leaders and influences included Carl August Björk (1837–1916) Paul Petter Waldenström (1838–1917) and David Nyvall (1863–1946), among others. They desired to create a voluntary "covenant of churches" that were committed to sharing the Gospel of Jesus, as well as provide means for ministerial training. The name was changed to the Evangelical Covenant Church of America in 1954. The "of America" was eventually abandoned because the denomination includes a Canadian conference.

== Status ==
The denominational offices are located in Chicago, Illinois, where they are also affiliated with North Park University and North Park Theological Seminary. The church was formerly affiliated with Endeavor Swedish Hospital, then known as Swedish Covenant Hospital. There are related Bible colleges in Alaska, where the church established early missions, and California. They are also affiliated with Minnehaha Academy, a pre-K–12 school in Minneapolis, Minnesota.

Jesus People USA, a commune in Chicago, is affiliated with the Covenant Church.

The church is divided into eleven regional conferences – Canada Conference, Central Conference, East Coast Conference (organized 1890), Great Lakes Conference, Midsouth Conference, Midwest Conference, Pacific Northwest Conference, Northwest Conference, Pacific Southwest Conference, Southeast Conference – and its newest conference, the Alaska Conference. The Covenant presence in Alaska started from 1887 as a foreign mission outpost, but gradually transitioned its status to a home mission, and finally full conference standing in 2015.

Annual meetings are held, to which delegates are sent by the congregations, reporting back to local churches.

Covenant Publications are the communication arm of the denomination. The denominational hymnal is The Covenant Hymnal: A Worship Book.

A major ministry of the denomination includes senior living facilities and is supplemented through its Covenant Benevolent Institutions department. Among the ECC retirement systems, The Samarkand and Covenant Shores are considered to be two of the top facilities in the United States.

As of 2011, denomination membership was 124,669 in 820 congregations in the United States (43 states) and an estimated 1500 members in 23 congregations in Canada (five provinces). Average attendance in 2009 was 178,997. The denomination also has ongoing missions work in 25 countries worldwide, with 125 long-term missionaries, project missionaries and short-term missionaries. The ECC has a worldwide membership of almost 278,000.

Membership is concentrated primarily in three regions of the United States: the Midwest, along the West Coast, and in the Great Plains region. California has the largest number of members, but the highest rates of membership are in Minnesota, Alaska, Kansas, Nebraska, and Washington.

== Other ==
Forerunners of the Swedish Evangelical Mission Covenant were the Swedish Evangelical Lutheran Ansgar Synod and the Swedish Evangelical Lutheran Mission Synod. When members of the two synods dissolved and the Swedish Evangelical Mission Covenant was formed, some of those who did not enter the Mission Covenant formed the Swedish Evangelical Free Mission (now the Evangelical Free Church of America). The Evangelical Covenant Church maintains ties with the Mission Covenant Church of Sweden (formerly known as the Svenska Missionsförbundet; see Svenska Missionskyrkan and CIPE), and the other churches in the International Federation of Free Evangelical Churches.

In the 1920s, Warner Sallman created illustrations for the denominational magazine, Covenant Companion, including his charcoal sketch The Son of Man for a 1924 magazine cover that was later redone as the famous oil painting The Head of Christ.

Since 1976, the denomination has ordained and licensed women as ministers.

Many figures in the Jesus Movement have formally linked themselves to the ECC.

In 2022, the Rev. Tammy Swanson-Draheim was elected as the first female president of the denomination.

== Stance on same-sex marriage ==
The ECC officially excludes same-sex marriage from its theology and practice. The ECC's 1996 resolution adopted by the Covenant Annual Meeting entitled "Resolution on Human Sexuality" represents the ongoing consensus position of the ECC. The resolution upholds "celibacy, the state of abstaining (outside of marriage) in singleness, and heterosexual relations as the Christian standard". Additionally, the ECC does not permit ministers to perform same-sex marriages.

The ECC, though, has been a pioneer among evangelical denominations with regard to its commitment to engagement with the LGBT community. In 2018, the ECC launched Embrace, a suite of human sexuality discipleship resources and learning experiences which are in harmony with the adopted position of the ECC. A special emphasis of Embrace is equipping ECC churches and individuals to "flourish in love" for LGBT individuals and communities.

The ECC does allow ministers to exercise pastoral discretion by attending a same-sex marriage ceremony. One congregation in Portland, Oregon, developed differing all-inclusive policy statements, prompting the ECC to remove that congregation in 2015. Moreover, some individuals affiliated with Covenant congregations have organized to advocate for more inclusive national policies.

At the June 2019 annual meeting of the ECC, First Covenant Church of Minneapolis was dismissed from the ECC's roster of churches after being deemed out of harmony with regard to its position on human sexuality and pastoral credentialing after a vote for involuntary dismissal by delegates surpassed a two-thirds supermajority. Delegates also surpassed a two-thirds supermajority in removing the ordination standing of two pastors who contravened the ECC's communally discerned position on human sexuality.

== Notable members ==
- Lincoln Brewster, musician
- Paul Carlson, missionary doctor
- Brian T. Carroll, American presidential candidate for the American Solidarity Party
- Alice Cooper, singer, songwriter, actor
- Nils Frykman, hymnwriter
- Craig Groeschel, minister of Life.Church
- Kirsten Haglund, Miss America 2008
- Mike Holmgren, former Super Bowl–winning National Football League head coach
- Johannes Alfred Hultman, musician
- Timothy Johnson, ABC News medical editor
- Lorenzo Romar, head coach of the Pepperdine University men's basketball team
- Warner Sallman, artist

== See also ==
- Läsare – Swedish Pietistic movement which influenced those who eventually founded the ECC
- Nyevangelism – related Swedish movement with ties to the Mission Friends and ECC
