= Paul J. Marwin =

American lawyer and politician

Paul J. Marwin (February 21, 1885 - November 29, 1931) was a lawyer who served as a member of the Minnesota House of Representatives.

== Biography ==
Marwin was born in Lund, Wisconsin. He graduated from North Park University and the University of Minnesota. In 1890, he came to Minneapolis, Minnesota where he was engaged as an attorney in active practice. He was elected to the Minnesota House of Representatives in District 29 serving from 1915 to 1918. Marwin died during 1931 in Hennepin County, Minnesota.
