= Nils Frykman =

Swedish teacher, evangelist and hymnwriter

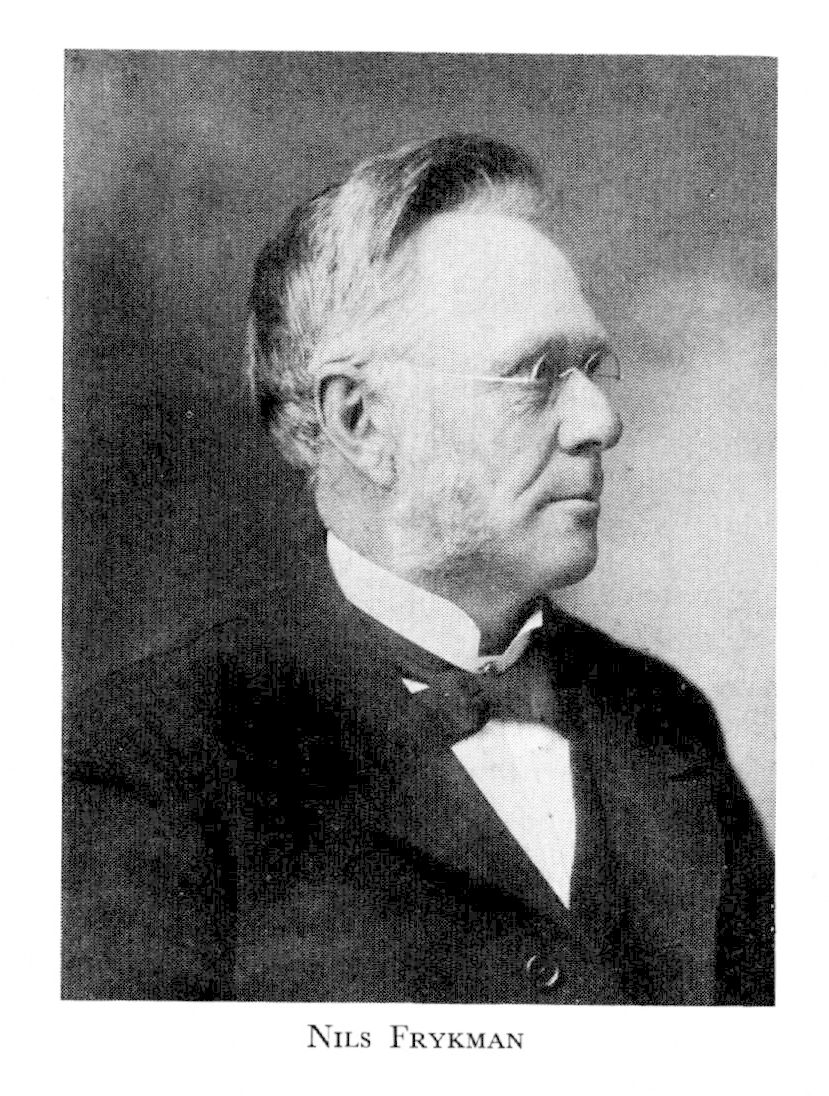
- Born: Nils Larsson; October 20, 1842; Sunne, Värmland
- Died: March 30, 1911 (aged 68); Minneapolis, Minnesota, U.S.
- Resting place: Lakewood Cemetery
- Occupation(s): teacher, evangelist, hymnwriter
- Spouse: Betty Anderdotter Jonsson (m. 1869)
- Children: 10

Nils Frykman (October 20, 1842 – March 30, 1911) was a Swedish teacher, evangelist and hymnwriter. He came to the United States in 1888 and was a pastor at Evangelical Covenant Churches in Illinois and Minnesota for nearly two decades. Known as "the joyous Christian singer", Frykman wrote over three hundred hymns, many of which are still sung by worshipers in Sweden and the United States.

== Sweden ==
Nils Larsson was born October 20, 1842, on a farm near Sunne, Värmland. In 1866 he enrolled at a teacher's college in Karlstad and took the last name of Frykman, which derived from the valley where he was born: Fryksdalen. After graduating in 1868 Frykman worked as a primary schoolteacher at schools in Värmland and Östergötland.

He married Betty Jonsson in 1869, with whom he had ten children. The couple's association with the Free Church and P. P. Waldenström led to conflicts with the school board until finally in 1883 Frykman gave up his teaching position.

For the next few years he devoted himself to the ministry, spreading the Gospel as an itinerant preacher. During all of this time Frykman was a prolific hymnwriter, publishing his lyrics in the Christian weekly Sanningsvittnet (Witness of the Truth).

== America ==
In 1888 Frykman and his family immigrated to the United States after he had accepted a pastorate at the Tabernacle Church of Chicago. They remained in that city until 1889 when he was called to Salem Mission Covenant Church in Pennock, Minnesota. He served the congregation there until his retirement in 1907.

His final years were spent in Minneapolis, where he held administrative posts with the Evangelical Covenant Church. In 1908 he oversaw the publication of Sions Basun (Zion's Trumpet). The first official hymnal of the Covenant Church, it had more than one hundred hymns written by Frykman.

Nils Frykman died on March 30, 1911, aged 68, at his home on Columbus Avenue in Minneapolis. He was buried in Lakewood Cemetery. His funeral at the Swedish Tabernacle (now First Covenant Church) in Minneapolis was attended by 2,000 mourners. In 1928 a monument was erected near his grave at Lakewood Cemetery in Minneapolis. Etched in stone are the opening lines of the hymn that he considered his best:

I have a future all sublime,
beyond the realms of space and time,
where my Redeemer I shall see,
and sorrow nevermore shall be.

== Selected hymns by Nils Frykman ==
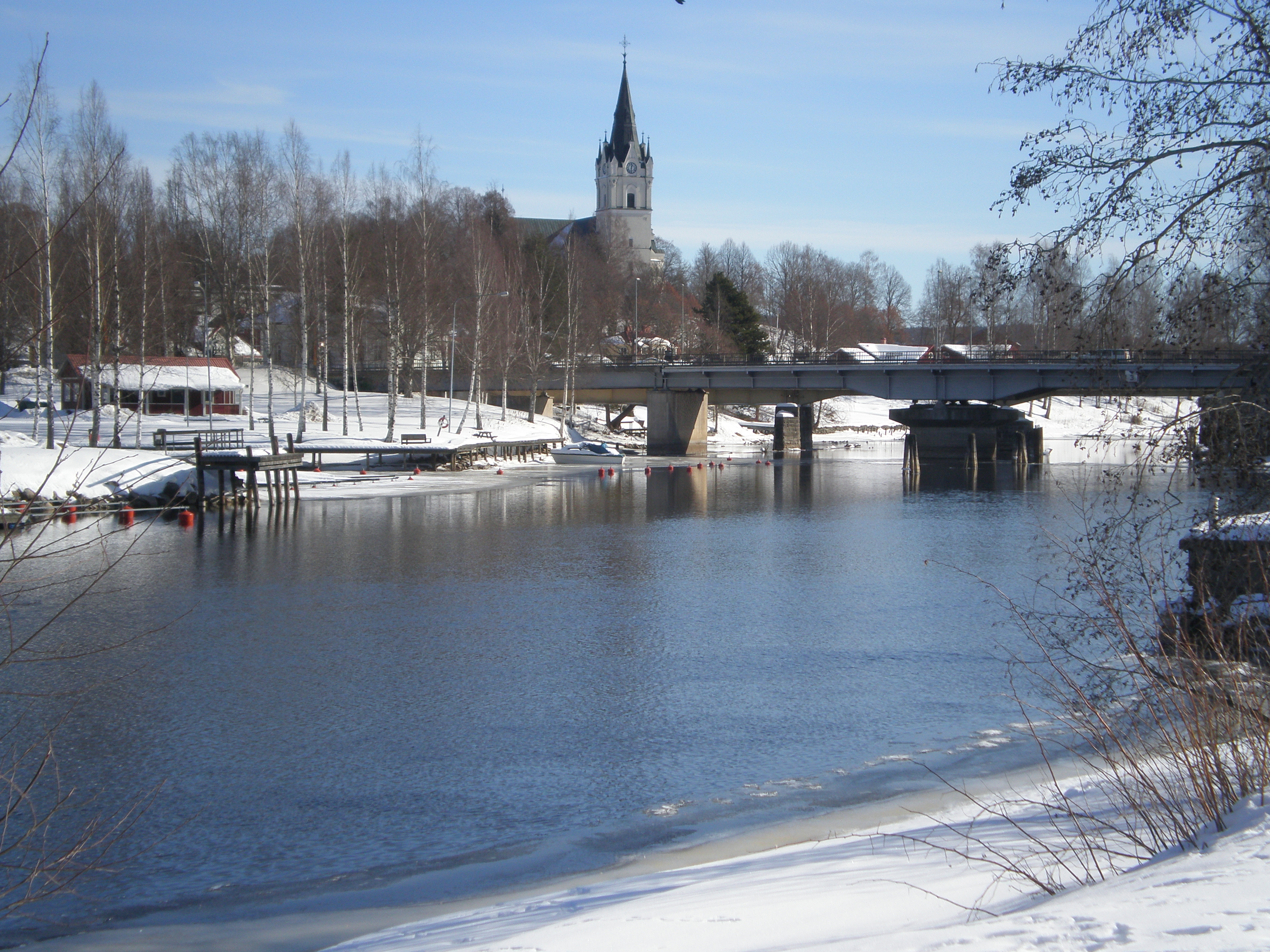
Sunne, Värmland

A number of Frykman's hymns are available as digital downloads. The 1990 album Frykman på gammalt vis (Frykman in the old style) can be purchased at iTunes.

Fröjdas vart sinne, Julen är inne (Joy bells are ringing)
Jag har en vän som älskar mig (I have a friend who loveth me)
Jag har i himlen en vän så god (I have in heaven a friend)
Min framtidsdag är ljus och lång (I have a future all sublime)
Nu är jag nöjd och glader (I sing with joy and gladness)
Närmare, Gud, till dig (Nearer, my God, to thee)
O sällhet stor (How great the joy the Lord provides)
Vem som helst kan bli frälst (Whosoe'er anywhere)
Vår store Gud gör stora under (Our mighty God works mighty wonders)
