= North Park Theological Seminary =

Coordinates: 41°58′28″N 87°42′44″W

- Established: 1891
- Affiliation: Evangelical Covenant Church
- Location: Chicago, Illinois, United States of America
- Website: www.northpark.edu/seminary/

North Park Theological Seminary is a seminary located in the North Park neighborhood of Chicago, Illinois. It is the sole graduate theological school of the Evangelical Covenant Church.

== History ==
In 1891, the school was founded by the Evangelical Covenant Church in Minneapolis. In 1894, the school moved to Chicago.

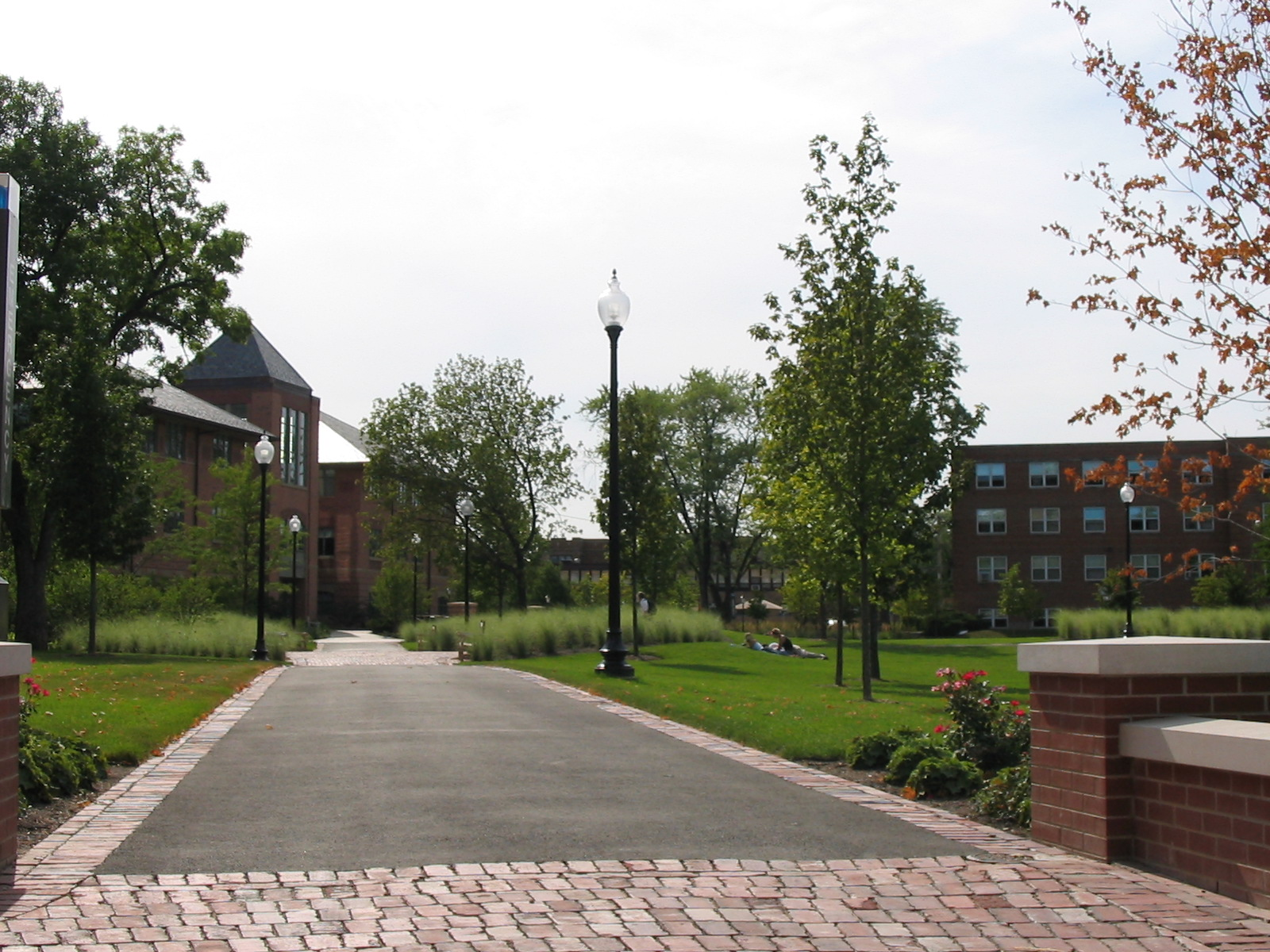
A view of the heart of North Park's campus

The seminary shares a campus with North Park University, the denomination's liberal arts college. The seminary's main building, Nyvall Hall, is named after David Nyvall, who was instrumental in the formation of the school and served as professor and president for many years.

Though retaining some of its Swedish roots, North Park Theological Seminary is now a multi-ethnic institution that fully supports women in ministry.

== Programs ==
The institution's academic programs include a Master of Arts (MA) in Christian Ministry, Master of Arts in Theological Studies, Master of Arts in Christian Formation, Master of Divinity (M.Div.), Doctor of Ministry (D.Min.) in Preaching, and various certificate programs.

The seminary is accredited by the Association of Theological Schools.

== Notable alumni and faculty ==
- Klyne Snodgrass, New Testament scholar and author
- Timothy Johnson, medical journalist
- Jon M. Sweeney, writer
