= Stephen T. Franklin =

American theologian and philosopher

Stephen T. Franklin is an Evangelical theologian and philosopher who is president emeritus of Tokyo Christian University. Franklin is one of the few evangelicals who is also a scholar of process theology; known for his research in the interaction of evangelical theology and process thought. Franklin is married to the former Martha Jean Evans, former associate professor of nursing at Shizuoka University in Shizuoka Prefecture, Japan.

== Education ==
Franklin attended North Park College (now North Park University) and graduated with a BA in philosophy in 1965. He then moved on to the University of Chicago to earn graduate degrees in philosophy and theology and was awarded a PhD in 1976 (by a dissertation committee comprising theologians Langdon Brown Gilkey and David Tracy, and philosopher Paul Ricoeur) for his work on language and religious symbolism based on Alfred North Whitehead's "philosophy of organism."

== Career ==
Franklin joined the faculty of Tokyo Christian University as professor of philosophy and theology in 1991. He was later elected, by the faculty and board of Tokyo Christian Institute, as dean of the faculty for a two-year period, and president of Tokyo Christian University in 1998. Franklin was re-elected president for a second term in 2002. He stepped down from this post in March 2006. Since stepping down as president, Franklin has been contributing to the advancement of higher education in Japan and the United States as professor of theology and philosophy at Tokyo Christian University and Olivet Nazarene University.

Franklin's most significant accomplishment during his tenure as president was the creation of the ACTS-ES (Asian Christian Theological Studies for English Speakers) program—a four-year course leading to a BA degree which combines the liberal arts, theology, cross-cultural studies, East Asian studies, and practical Christian living. The course has been very successful, and has attracted students from the United States, Europe, and Africa, though it was originally designed for students from Asia.

Before joining the faculty of Tokyo Christian University, Franklin held professorships in theology andpPhilosophy at Wheaton College Graduate School, Tsukuba University, and William Rainey Harper College. He has also been a visiting faculty member at St. James Bible College (Magadan, Russia), Seikei Theological Seminary (Tokyo), University of Maryland, and North Park University.

In addition to his publications in theology and process thought, Franklin has also been the recipient of numerous invitations to speak at universities and academic institutions around the world.

== Publications ==
Books

- Faith, Learning, and Life: The Identity of the Christian University in Japan. Japanese Trans. by Shin Toyokawa. (Tokyo: Inochi no Kotobasha, 2006).
- Speaking from the Depths: Alfred North Whitehead’s Hermenuetical Metaphysics of Propositions, Experience, Symbolism, Language, and Religion. Grand Rapids, MI: William B. Eerdmans Publishing Co., 1990. ISBN 0-8028-0370-9 (based on his Ph.D. dissertation)

Articles

- “God and Creativity: A Revisionist Proposal within a Whiteheadian Context.” Process Studies 29.2 (2001): 237–307.
- “Van Til on Autonomy.” Christ and the World 9 (March, 1999): 91–126.
- “Is Theology Dead?” Christ and the World 9 (March, 1999): 154–160.
- "Process Thought From an Evangelical Perspective: An Appreciation and Critique." Christian Scholar’s Review, vol. 28, no. 1 (Fall 1998) p. 71–89. abstract online
- “The Christian’s Guide to Islam: Part Two.” Japanese Trans. by Akio Ito. Christ and the World 6 (March, 1996): 21–56.
- “The Theological Foundations of the Christian Liberal Arts in Relation to the Distinctives of the Christian Liberal Arts College/University.” Christian Scholar’s Review XXIV:3 (March 1995): 253 - 77.
- “The Logic of Evangelical Theology.” Japanese trans. by Motomasa Murayama. Chap-ter 11 of Shukyo Tagen Shugi no Tankyu (Studies in Religious Pluralism). Ed. by Hisa-masa Mase and Hisakazu Inagaki. (Tokyo: Taimeido Publishers. 1995): 208–26.
- “The Christian’s Guide to Islam: Part One.” Japanese trans. by Akio Ito. Christ and the World 5 (March 1995): 16–46.
- “The Unique Christ as the Hope and Judgment of the World.” Evangelical Review of Theology 17 (January, 1993): 29–53.
- “Evangelism Among Japanese Evangelicals.” Japan Christian Review 58 (1992): 53–59.
- “Theological Education and the Liberal Arts.” Christ and the World 2 (March, 1992): 1-22.
- “Toward a Theology of Evangelizing World Class Cities.” The Japan Christian Quarterly 57 (Summer, 1991): 180–88.
