= Timothy Johnson (medical journalist) =

American physician and journalist

G. Timothy Johnson
- Born: July 9, 1936 (age 90)
- Education: – Augustana College: North Park Theological Seminary; Albany Medical College; Harvard University
- Occupations: Academic; -Minister -Physician -Television journalist -Writer
- Notable credit(s): Medical Reporter – ABC News; Chief Medical Correspondent – ABC News

G. Timothy Johnson (born July 9, 1936) is an American academic, pastor, physician, retired television journalist, and writer who, as "Dr. Tim Johnson", is known to television viewers as the longtime Chief Medical Correspondent for ABC News on the ABC television network.

== Education ==
Johnson received his undergraduate degree from Augustana College in Rock Island, Illinois, where he earned Phi Beta Kappa honors. In 1963, he graduated from North Park Theological Seminary in Chicago, Illinois and became an ordained minister with the Evangelical Covenant Church.

After two years in the ministry, he entered medical school and graduated summa cum laude from Albany Medical College in Albany, New York, and subsequently received a master's degree in public health from Harvard University in Cambridge, Massachusetts.

== Medical career ==
For many years he has been a member of the faculty of the Harvard Medical School at Harvard University and on the staff of Massachusetts General Hospital, a teaching hospital of the Harvard Medical School and a biomedical research facility in Boston, Massachusetts.

== Television career ==
=== Early television career ===
Johnson started his television career in the 1970s at WRGB in Schenectady, New York while at Albany Medical Center. He moved to Boston in 1972 and became a charter staffer at newly signed-on WCVB-TV's Sunday Open House with a live, weekly segment interviewing other medical professionals about medical issues. He also hosted "House Call", a half-hour weekly series on answering health-related questions from viewers and interviewing doctors and nurses on various health topics. The show was popular and won WCVB-TV an Emmy.

He later became host of HealthBeat, a national health TV magazine program, produced at WCVB-TV and syndicated by Metromedia (the station's then-parent company) from 1982 to 1984.

=== ABC News ===
In 1975, he joined ABC News as the medical reporter, and later became the "Medical Editor" of Good Morning America (GMA), ABC News's morning-news-and-talk program upon its première on November 3, 1975. In over three decades at ABC News, he has reported for their various programs including World News Tonight, a daily evening-news program; Nightline, a late-night hard and soft news program; 20/20, a prime-time television-newsmagazine program.

Dr. Jennifer Ashton was the Chief Medical Editor for ABC News while Johnson still served as a correspondent. Typically, though not exclusively, Ashton reported on developments in nutrition and pediatrics, while Johnson focused on health issues for senior adults.

=== Retirement ===
Johnson retired from ABC in 2010., and retired from WCVB-TV at the end of 2012.

== Ministry ==
Johnson continues as a Pastor in the Evangelical Covenant Church.

== Awards ==
Johnson was inducted as a Laureate of The Lincoln Academy of Illinois, and awarded the Order of Lincoln (the State's highest honor) by the Governor of Illinois in 2013 in the area of Communications.

== Bibliography ==
Johnson published a book Finding God in the Questions: A Personal Journey (2004) (InterVarsity Press, ISBN 978-0-8308-3214-9) describing his journey of how he became a Christian, and answering a series of questions, such as "Why Bother With Religion and the Bible?" and "What Did Jesus Teach?"
