= Marwin Reuvers =

Dutch footballer

Personal information
- Date of birth: 4 March 1999 (age 27)
- Place of birth: Roosendaal, Netherlands
- Height: 1.80 m (5 ft 11 in)
- Position: Midfielder

Team information
- Current team: RBC Roosendaal
- Number: 8

Youth career
- –2012: RKSV BSC
- 2012–2018: NAC Breda

Senior career*
Years	Team	Apps	(Gls)
2018–2021	NAC Breda	5	(0)
2021–	RBC Roosendaal		
- * Club domestic league appearances and goals as of 4 August 2025

Marwin Reuvers (born 4 March 1999) is a Dutch professional footballer who plays as a midfielder for Derde Divisie club RBC Roosendaal.

== Club career ==
Reuvers was at his home town club youth academy in Roosendaal before bankruptcy led to its closure. Instead he joined the youth set up at NAC Breda. He made his Eredivisie debut for Breda on 18 August 2018 in a game against De Graafschap. On 7 June 2021 he agreed to a move to a now re-established after bankruptcy RBC Roosendaal.
