= List of North Park Vikings head football coaches =

The North Park Vikings football program is a college football team that represents North Park University in the College Conference of Illinois and Wisconsin, a part of the NCAA Division III. The team has had at least 17 head coaches since its first recorded football game in 1934, although records for coach names only begin in 1958. The current coach is Kyle Rooker who first took the position for the 2019 season.

== Key ==
Key to symbols in coaches list
| General | | Overall | | Conference | | Postseason (Note: Although the first Rose Bowl Game was played in 1902, it has been continuously played since the 1916 game, and is recognized as the oldest bowl game by the NCAA. "—" indicates any season prior to 1916 when postseason games were not played.) | |
|---|---|---|---|---|---|---|---|
| No. | Order of coaches (Note: A running total of the number of head coaches, with coaches who served separate tenures being counted only once. Interim head coaches are represented with "Int" and are not counted in the running total. "—" indicates the team played but either without a coach or no coach is on record. "X" indicates an interim year without play.) | GC | Games coached | CW | Conference wins | PW | Postseason wins |
| DC | Division championships | OW | Overall wins | CL | Conference losses | PL | Postseason losses |
| CC | Conference championships | OL | Overall losses | CT | Conference ties | PT | Postseason ties |
| NC | National championships | OT | Overall ties (Note: Overtime rules in college football were introduced in 1996, making ties impossible in the period since.) | C% | Conference winning percentage | | |
| † | Elected to the College Football Hall of Fame | O% | Overall winning percentage (Note: When computing the win–loss percentage, a tie counts as half a win and half a loss.) | | | | |

== Coaches ==
Statistics correct as of the end of the 2025 college football season.

| No. | Name | Term | GC | OW | OL | OT | O% | CW | CL | CT | C% | PW | PL | CCs | NCs | Awards |
|---|---|---|---|---|---|---|---|---|---|---|---|---|---|---|---|---|
| - | unknown coach/coaches | 1934–1942 | | | | | | | | | | | | | | |
| X | No team | | — | — | — | — | — | — | — | — | | — | — | — | — | |
| - | unknown coach/coaches | 1944–1957 | | | | | | | | | | | | | | |
| 1 | Harold Swanson | 1958–1960 | 25 | 17 | 7 | 1 | .700 | — | — | — | | — | — | — | — | |
| 2 | Bob Lord | 1961–1963 | 24 | 6 | 18 | 0 | .250 | — | — | — | | — | — | — | — | |
| 3 | James Rooney | 1964–1966 | 24 | 2 | 21 | 1 | .104 | — | — | — | | — | — | — | — | |
| 4 | Norm Rathje | 1967–1968 | 18 | 9 | 9 | 0 | .500 | — | — | — | | — | — | — | — | |
| 5 | Charles E. Emery | 1969 | 9 | 2 | 7 | 0 | .222 | — | — | — | | — | — | — | — | |
| 6 | William D. Gourley | 1970–1972 | 27 | 8 | 17 | 2 | .333 | — | — | — | | — | — | — | — | |
| 7 | Mike Watson | 1973–1974 | 18 | 6 | 12 | 0 | .333 | — | — | — | | — | — | — | — | |
| 8 | Gene Mitz | 1975–1977 | 27 | 2 | 25 | 0 | .074 | — | — | — | | — | — | — | — | |
| 9 | Bill Anderson | 1978–1985 | 72 | 15 | 57 | 0 | .208 | — | — | — | | — | — | — | — | |
| 10 | Ron Ellett | 1986 | 9 | 0 | 9 | 0 | .000 | — | — | — | | — | — | — | — | |
| 11 | Craig Fouhy | 1987–1988 | 18 | 1 | 17 | 0 | .056 | — | — | — | | — | — | — | — | |
| 12 | Mel Boehland | 1989 | 9 | 1 | 8 | 0 | .111 | — | — | — | | — | — | — | — | |
| 13 | Tim Rucks | 1990–1994 | 45 | 9 | 33 | 3 | .233 | — | — | — | | — | — | — | — | |
| 14 | Mike Liljegren | 1995–2000 | 55 | 9 | 46 | 0 | .164 | — | — | — | | — | — | — | — | |
| 15 | Robin Cooper | 2001–2005 | 50 | 9 | 41 | 0 | .180 | — | — | — | | — | — | — | — | |
| 16 | Scott Pethtel | 2006–2012 | 70 | 10 | 60 | 0 | .143 | — | — | — | | — | — | — | — | |
| 17 | Mike Conway | 2013–2018 | 60 | 14 | 46 | 0 | .233 | — | — | — | | — | — | — | — | |
| 18 | Kyle Rooker | 2019–present | 60 | 17 | 43 | 0 | .283 | — | — | — | | — | — | — | — | |
