= 1974 NCAA Division III football season =

American college football season

- Regular season: August – November 1974
- Playoffs: November – December 1974
- National championship: Garrett-Harrison Stadium; Phenix City, AL
- Champion: Central (IA)

The 1974 NCAA Division III football season, part of college football in the United States organized by the National Collegiate Athletic Association at the Division III level, began in August 1974, and concluded with the NCAA Division III Football Championship in December 1974 at Garrett-Harrison Stadium in Phenix City, Alabama. The Central Dutch won their first Division III championship, defeating the Ithaca Bombers by a final score of 10−8.

== Conference standings ==
1974 College Athletic Conference football standings
	Conf.					Overall
Team	W		L		T	W		L		T
Rose–Hulman $	3	–	0	–	1	5	–	3	–	1
Southwestern (TN)	2	–	1	–	1	3	–	3	–	3
Centre	2	–	2	–	0	3	–	6	–	0
Sewanee	2	–	2	–	0	2	–	6	–	0
Principia	1	–	3	–	0	2	–	7	–	0
$ – Conference champion

1974 College Conference of Illinois and Wisconsin football standings
	Conf.					Overall
Team	W		L		T	W		L		T
No. 9 Illinois Wesleyan +	7	–	1	–	0	8	–	1	–	0
No. 11 Millikin +	7	–	1	–	0	8	–	2	–	0
Carroll (WI)	5	–	3	–	0	6	–	3	–	0
Augustana (IL)	4	–	3	–	1	5	–	3	–	1
Carthage	4	–	3	–	1	5	–	3	–	1
Wheaton (IL)	4	–	4	–	0	4	–	5	–	0
North Park	2	–	6	–	0	3	–	6	–	0
Elmhurst	1	–	7	–	0	1	–	8	–	0
North Central (IL)	1	–	7	–	0	1	–	8	–	0
+ – Conference co-champions; Rankings from NAIA Division II poll

1974 Eastern Football Conference football standings
	Conf.					Overall
Team	W		L		T	W		L		T
Central Connecticut State $	3	–	0	–	0	4	–	5	–	1
Glassboro State	2	–	1	–	0	6	–	3	–	1
Montclair State	1	–	2	–	0	6	–	3	–	1
Southern Connecticut State	0	–	3	–	0	4	–	5	–	0
$ – Conference champion

1974 Independent College Athletic Conference football standings
	Conf.					Overall
Team	W		L		T	W		L		T
Ithaca $^	3	–	0	–	0	10	–	1	–	0
Hobart	3	–	1	–	0	8	–	1	–	0
St. Lawrence	3	–	2	–	0	7	–	2	–	0
Alfred	2	–	2	–	0	4	–	4	–	0
RIT	1	–	4	–	0	1	–	7	–	0
RPI	0	–	3	–	0	4	–	6	–	0
$ – Conference champion; ^ – NCAA Division III playoff participant

1974 Indiana Collegiate Conference football standings
	Conf.					Overall
Team	W		L		T	W		L		T
Butler $	6	–	0	–	0	8	–	2	–	0
Evansville ^	5	–	1	–	0	8	–	2	–	0
DePauw	4	–	2	–	0	7	–	3	–	0
Indiana Central	2	–	4	–	0	5	–	5	–	0
Wabash	2	–	4	–	0	5	–	5	–	0
Valparaiso	2	–	4	–	0	3	–	6	–	0
Saint Joseph's (IN)	0	–	6	–	0	0	–	9	–	0
$ – Conference champion; ^ – NCAA Division III playoff participant

1974 Iowa Conference football standings
	Conf.					Overall
Team	W		L		T	W		L		T
Central (IA) $^	7	–	0	–	0	11	–	0	–	0
No. 8 William Penn	6	–	1	–	0	9	–	2	–	0
Buena Vista	4	–	3	–	0	5	–	4	–	0
Upper Iowa	4	–	3	–	0	4	–	5	–	0
Luther	3	–	4	–	0	3	–	6	–	0
Simpson (IA)	2	–	5	–	0	2	–	6	–	1
Dubuque	1	–	6	–	0	4	–	7	–	0
Wartburg	1	–	6	–	0	2	–	8	–	0
$ – Conference champion; ^ – NCAA Division III playoff participant; Rankings from NAIA Division II poll

1974 Mason–Dixon Conference football standings
	Conf.					Overall
Team	W		L		T	W		L		T
Towson State $	4	–	0	–	0	10	–	0	–	0
Randolph–Macon	2	–	1	–	0	6	–	2	–	1
Hampden–Sydney	2	–	2	–	0	6	–	4	–	0
Salisbury State	1	–	1	–	0	4	–	4	–	1
Bridgewater	1	–	2	–	0	4	–	5	–	0
Western Maryland	1	–	2	–	0	2	–	7	–	0
Gallaudet	0	–	1	–	0	3	–	6	–	0
Johns Hopkins	0	–	2	–	0	3	–	5	–	1
$ – Conference champion

1974 Metropolitan Intercollegiate Conference football standings
	Conf.					Overall
Team	W		L		T	W		L		T
C. W. Post $	4	–	0	–	0	6	–	4	–	0
Merchant Marine	3	–	1	–	0	6	–	3	–	0
Seton Hall	2	–	1	–	0	7	–	2	–	0
Wagner	2	–	2	–	0	5	–	3	–	1
Fordham	0	–	3	–	1	3	–	5	–	1
Hofstra	0	–	4	–	1	1	–	9	–	1
$ – Conference champion

1974 Michigan Intercollegiate Athletic Association football standings
	Conf.					Overall
Team	W		L		T	W		L		T
Olivet $	5	–	0	–	0	7	–	2	–	0
Hope	4	–	1	–	0	8	–	1	–	0
Alma	3	–	2	–	0	4	–	5	–	0
Albion	2	–	3	–	0	3	–	6	–	0
Kalamazoo	1	–	4	–	0	2	–	6	–	0
Adrian	0	–	5	–	0	2	–	7	–	0
$ – Conference champion

1974 Middle Atlantic Conference football standings
	Conf.					Overall
Team	W		L		T	W		L		T
Northern Division
Wilkes x	6	–	0	–	0	7	–	2	–	0
Juniata	5	–	1	–	0	7	–	2	–	0
Albright	4	–	2	–	0	6	–	3	–	0
Susquehanna	3	–	3	–	0	4	–	5	–	1
Delaware Valley	2	–	4	–	0	2	–	6	–	0
Lycoming	1	–	5	–	0	3	–	6	–	0
Upsala	0	–	6	–	0	0	–	8	–	0
Southern Division
Franklin & Marshall x	8	–	0	–	0	9	–	0	–	0
Widener	7	–	1	–	0	8	–	1	–	0
Moravian	4	–	2	–	0	5	–	5	–	0
Johns Hopkins	3	–	2	–	1	3	–	5	–	1
Dickinson	5	–	4	–	0	5	–	4	–	0
Lebanon Valley	4	–	4	–	0	5	–	4	–	0
Muhlenberg	2	–	6	–	0	2	–	7	–	0
Ursinus	1	–	5	–	1	1	–	6	–	1
Western Maryland	1	–	6	–	0	2	–	7	–	0
Swarthmore	0	–	7	–	0	0	–	7	–	0
x – Division champion/co-champions

1974 Midwest Conference football standings
	Conf.					Overall
Team	W		L		T	W		L		T
Coe $	7	–	0	–	0	8	–	1	–	0
Lawrence	5	–	2	–	0	7	–	2	–	0
Ripon	5	–	2	–	0	7	–	2	–	0
Cornell (IA)	4	–	3	–	0	5	–	4	–	0
Carleton	3	–	4	–	0	4	–	5	–	0
Grinnell	2	–	5	–	0	3	–	6	–	0
Beloit	1	–	6	–	0	2	–	7	–	0
Knox	1	–	6	–	0	1	–	8	–	0
Monmouth (IL)			–			7	–	2	–	0
Lake Forest			–			2	–	6	–	0
$ – Conference champion; Games against and Lake Forest Monmouth (IL) were not counted in the conference standings.

1974 Minnesota Intercollegiate Athletic Conference football standings
	Conf.					Overall
Team	W		L		T	W		L		T
Concordia–Moorhead +	5	–	2	–	0	7	–	2	–	0
No. 20 Saint John's (MN) +	5	–	2	–	0	7	–	2	–	0
Minnesota–Duluth	4	–	2	–	1	7	–	2	–	1
Hamline	4	–	2	–	1	4	–	5	–	1
St. Thomas (MN)	4	–	3	–	0	5	–	4	–	0
Gustavus Adolphus	4	–	3	–	0	4	–	6	–	0
Augsburg	3	–	4	–	0	5	–	5	–	0
St. Olaf	1	–	6	–	0	3	–	6	–	0
Macalester	1	–	6	–	0	2	–	8	–	0
+ – Conference co-champions; Macalester's win over Gustavus Adolphus counted in the conference standings for Macalester, but not for Gustavus Adolphus.; Rankings from NAIA Division I poll

1974 New England Football Conference standings
	Conf.					Overall
Team	W		L		T	W		L		T
Nichols $	6	–	0	–	1	7	–	1	–	1
Plymouth State	5	–	1	–	1	7	–	1	–	1
Boston State	5	–	2	–	1	5	–	3	–	1
Curry	5	–	2	–	1	5	–	3	–	1
Framingham State	4	–	3	–	0	5	–	3	–	0
Bridgewater State	4	–	3	–	0	6	–	4	–	0
Massachusetts Maritime	2	–	6	–	0	3	–	6	–	0
Maine Maritime	1	–	7	–	0	1	–	8	–	0
New Haven	0	–	8	–	0	0	–	9	–	0
$ – Conference champion

1974 New Jersey State Athletic Conference football standings
	Conf.					Overall
Team	W		L		T	W		L		T
Glassboro State $	4	–	0	–	1	6	–	3	–	1
Kean	3	–	1	–	0	8	–	2	–	0
Trenton State	3	–	1	–	1	5	–	4	–	1
Montclair State	2	–	2	–	0	6	–	3	–	1
William Paterson	1	–	4	–	0	3	–	7	–	0
Jersey City State	0	–	5	–	0	0	–	9	–	0
$ – Conference champion

1974 Ohio Athletic Conference football standings
	Conf.					Overall
Team	W		L		T	W		L		T
Blue Division
Wittenberg xy$	3	–	0	–	1	7	–	1	–	2
Mount Union	3	–	1	–	0	7	–	2	–	0
Capital	2	–	2	–	0	5	–	4	–	0
Ohio Wesleyan	1	–	3	–	0	4	–	5	–	0
Denison	0	–	3	–	1	3	–	5	–	1
Red Division
Baldwin–Wallace xy	5	–	0	–	0	8	–	2	–	0
Otterbein	4	–	1	–	0	6	–	3	–	0
Marietta	3	–	2	–	0	6	–	3	–	0
Muskingum	2	–	3	–	0	4	–	5	–	0
Heidelberg	1	–	4	–	0	2	–	6	–	0
Wooster	0	–	5	–	0	2	–	6	–	0
Not competing for championship
Oberlin			–			5	–	4	–	0
Kenyon			–			2	–	6	–	1
Ohio Northern			–			2	–	7	–	0
Championship: Wittenberg 17, Baldwin–Wallace 0
$ – Conference champion; x – Division champion/co-champions; y – Championship game participant

1974 Pennsylvania State Athletic Conference football standings
	Conf.					Overall
Team	W		L		T	W		L		T
East Division
West Chester xy	5	–	0	–	0	8	–	2	–	0
No. 6 Millersville	5	–	1	–	0	8	–	1	–	0
East Stroudsburg	4	–	2	–	0	5	–	5	–	0
Kutztown	3	–	3	–	0	4	–	5	–	0
Cheyney	2	–	4	–	0	5	–	4	–	0
Mansfield	0	–	4	–	1	1	–	7	–	1
Bloomsburg	0	–	5	–	1	1	–	7	–	1
West Division
No. 13 Slippery Rock xy$^	5	–	0	–	1	9	–	1	–	1
Clarion	4	–	1	–	1	6	–	2	–	1
Indiana (PA)	4	–	2	–	0	6	–	4	–	0
Shippensburg	3	–	3	–	0	6	–	4	–	0
Edinboro	2	–	2	–	2	5	–	2	–	2
California (PA)	1	–	5	–	0	1	–	7	–	0
Lock Haven	0	–	6	–	0	1	–	8	–	0
Championship: Slippery Rock 20, West Chester 7
$ – Conference champion; x – Division champion/co-champions; y – Championship game participant; ^ – NCAA Division III playoff participant; Rankings from AP small college poll for Slippery Rock and NAIA Division I poll for Millersville

1974 Presidents' Athletic Conference football standings
	Conf.					Overall
Team	W		L		T	W		L		T
Allegheny +	6	–	1	–	0	7	–	1	–	0
John Carroll +	6	–	1	–	0	7	–	2	–	0
Bethany (WV)	4	–	3	–	0	5	–	3	–	1
Hiram	3	–	3	–	1	4	–	4	–	1
Thiel	3	–	3	–	1	4	–	4	–	1
Carnegie Mellon	2	–	5	–	0	3	–	5	–	0
Case Western Reserve	2	–	5	–	0	2	–	7	–	0
Washington & Jefferson	1	–	6	–	0	1	–	7	–	0
+ – Conference co-champions

1974 Southern California Intercollegiate Athletic Conference football standings
	Conf.					Overall
Team	W		L		T	W		L		T
No. 13 Redlands $	5	–	0	–	0	7	–	2	–	0
No. T–17 Whittier	4	–	1	–	0	7	–	2	–	0
La Verne	3	–	2	–	0	5	–	5	–	0
Claremont-Mudd	1	–	4	–	0	2	–	6	–	0
Occidental	1	–	4	–	0	1	–	7	–	0
Pomona-Pitzer	1	–	4	–	0	1	–	8	–	0
$ – Conference champion; Rankings from NAIA Division II poll

1974 Virginia College Athletic Association football standings
	Conf.					Overall
Team	W		L		T	W		L		T
Virginia Union	2	–	0	–	0	8	–	2	–	0
Randolph–Macon	4	–	0	–	1	6	–	2	–	1
Hampden–Sydney	4	–	1	–	0	6	–	4	–	0
Virginia State	2	–	1	–	0	3	–	7	–	0
Madison	3	–	2	–	0	6	–	4	–	0
Hampton	1	–	2	–	0	3	–	7	–	0
Bridgewater	1	–	3	–	0	4	–	5	–	0
Washington and Lee	0	–	2	–	1	1	–	8	–	1
Emory & Henry	0	–	3	–	0	3	–	8	–	0
Saint Paul's (VA)	0	–	3	–	0	1	–	8	–	0

1974 Wisconsin State University Conference football standings
	Conf.					Overall
Team	W		L		T	W		L		T
No. 17 Wisconsin–Platteville +	7	–	1	–	0	8	–	2	–	0
No. 18 Wisconsin–Whitewater +	7	–	1	–	0	8	–	3	–	0
No. 16 Wisconsin–La Crosse +	7	–	1	–	0	7	–	3	–	0
Wisconsin–River Falls	5	–	3	–	0	7	–	3	–	0
Wisconsin–Eau Claire	4	–	4	–	0	6	–	4	–	0
Wisconsin–Oshkosh	2	–	6	–	0	3	–	7	–	0
Wisconsin–Stevens Point	2	–	6	–	0	3	–	7	–	0
Wisconsin–Stout	1	–	7	–	0	2	–	8	–	0
Wisconsin–Superior	1	–	7	–	0	1	–	9	–	0
+ – Conference co-champions; Wisconsin–La Crosse forfeited one non-conference game.; Rankings from NAIA Division I poll

1974 NCAA Division III independents football records
	Conf.			Overall
Team	W	L	T	W		L		T
Albany		–		9	–	0	–	0
Colorado College		–		8	–	1	–	0
St. Norbert		–		8	–	2	–	0
Georgetown		–		6	–	2	–	0
Norwich		–		6	–	3	–	0
Millsaps		–		5	–	3	–	0
Grove City		–		5	–	3	–	1
Bridgeport		–		6	–	4	–	0
Ashland		–		5	–	5	–	0
Salisbury State		–		4	–	4	–	1
Trinity (TX)		–		5	–	5	–	1
Rochester (NY)		–		3	–	6	–	0
Saint Mary's		–		3	–	6	–	0
Saint Peter's		–		3	–	6	–	0
Cortland		–		2	–	6	–	1
Maryville (TN)		–		2	–	6	–	1
San Diego		–		3	–	8	–	0
Brockport		–		2	–	6	–	0
Fairleigh Dickinson–Florham		–		0	–	5	–	0
Chicago		–		0	–	8	–	0

== Conference champions ==
Conference	Champion(s)
College Athletic Conference	Rose–Hulman
College Conference of Illinois and Wisconsin	Illinois Wesleyan; Millikin
Independent College Athletic Conference	Ithaca
Iowa Intercollegiate Athletic Conference	Central (IA)
Michigan Intercollegiate Athletic Association	Olivet
Middle Atlantic Conference	Wilkes (North); Franklin & Marshall (South)
Midwest Collegiate Athletic Conference	Coe
Minnesota Intercollegiate Athletic Conference	Concordia–Moorhead; Saint John's (MN)
New England Football Conference	Boston State; Nichols
New Jersey State Athletic Conference	Glassboro State
Northwest Conference	Linfield
Southern Intercollegiate Athletic Conference	Clark Atlanta
Southern California Intercollegiate Athletic Conference	Redlands
Wisconsin Intercollegiate Athletic Conference	Wisconsin–La Crosse; Wisconsin–Platteville; Wisconsin–Whitewater

== Postseason ==
The 1974 NCAA Division III Football Championship playoffs were the second annual single-elimination tournament to determine the national champion of men's NCAA Division III college football. The championship game was held at Garrett-Harrison Stadium in Phenix City, Alabama. Like the 1973 championship, this year's bracket featured only four teams.

=== Playoff bracket ===
Semifinals; Campus Sites
Central (IA)	17
Evansville	16
Ithaca	27
Slippery Rock	14

National Championship Game; Garrett-Harrison Stadium; Phenix City, AL
Central (IA)	10
Ithaca	8

== Coaching changes ==
This list includes all head coaching changes announced during or after the season.

School	Outgoing coach	Reason	Replacement	Previous position
Boston State	Lary Kuharich	Hired as defensive coordinator for Rhode Island	Mac Singleton	Boston State director of intramural athletics (1974)
Dubuque	Maury Waugh	Resigned (Note: Initially announced his resignation on October 17, 1974, but did not take effect until the end of the season. He was subsequently hired as the head coach for Simpson in January 1975.)	Larry Pohlman	Crown Point HS (IN) head coach (1972–1974)
Fordham	Dean Loucks	Fired	Dave Rice	Western Connecticut head coach (1972–1974)
Franklin & Marshall	Bob Curtis	Hired as head coach for Bucknell	Tom Gilburg	Lehigh linebackers coach (1971–1974)
Hofstra	Howdy Myers	Retired (Note: Forced to retire due to Hofstra's mandatory retirement age of 65, but he continued to coach elsewhere.)	Bill Leete	Hofstra defensive coordinator (1969–1974)
Kean	Ron San Fillipo	Hired as athletic director for James Caldwell HS (NJ)	Johnny Allen	Kean backfield coach (1973–1974)
North Central (IL)	N/A	Hired co-head coach	Ron Guenther	Boston College offensive line coach (1971–1974)
North Park	Mike Watson	Hired as athletic director for Minnehaha Academy (MN)	Gene Mitz	Drake offensive line coach (1973–1974)
Norwich	Joseph G. Sabol	Hired as head coach for Gettysburg	Barry Mynter	Norwich defensive coordinator (1965–1974)
Oberlin	Cass Jackson	Hired as head coach for Morris Brown	Richard Riendeau	Albany Metro Mallers head coach (1973)
Otterbein	Bob Agler	Retired	Rich Seils	Otterbein backfield coach (1973–1974)
Simpson	Larry Johnson (full-season interim)	Permanent replacement hired	Maury Waugh	Dubuque head coach (1969–1974)
Swarthmore	Lew Elverson	Retired	Tom Lapinski	Mount Pleasant HS (DE) head coach (1972–1974)
Trenton State	Dick Curl	Hired as wide receivers coach and tight ends coach for Rutgers	Carmen Piccone	Cornell offensive coordinator (1967–1974)
William Paterson	Bob Trocolor	Resigned	Jack Stephans	William Paterson assistant coach (1974)
Wisconsin–Superior	Ed Bender	Resigned	Mertz Mortorelli	Wisconsin–Superior head coach (1954–1969) (Note: Also served as Wisconsin–Superior athletic director since 1954.)
Wooster	Pat O'Brien	Fired	Don Hunsinger	Capital defensive coordinator (1973–1974)

== See also ==
- 1974 NCAA Division I football season
- 1974 NCAA Division II football season
- 1974 NAIA Division I football season
- 1974 NAIA Division II football season
