= Liljegren =

Liljegren is a surname. Notable people with the surname include:

- Christian Liljegren (born 1971), Swedish singer
- Erik Liljegren, American television correspondent
- Freddie Liljegren (born 1993), Swedish singer
- Fredrik Liljegren (born 1969), Swedish computer scientist
- Kirstin Liljegren (born 1996), Danish fashion model
- Mike Liljegren, American football coach
- Sofia Liljegren (1765–1795), Swedish-Finnish soprano
- Sten Bodvar Liljegren (1885–1984), Swedish Anglist
- Timothy Liljegren (born 1999), Swedish ice hockey player
