= Rathje =

Rathje may refer to:

- Peotone Mill, formerly known as the Rathje Mill, an historic mill in Peotone, Illinois, United States

== People with the surname ==
- Ellen Rathje, American civil engineer
- Mike Rathje (born 1974), Canadian ice hockey player
- Norm Rathje (1936–2011), American football player and coach
- Tor Rathje Eckhoff (1964–2021), Norwegian YouTuber
- S. Louis Rathje (born 1939), American judge
- William Rathje (1945–2012), American archaeologist and professor

== See also ==
- Rathjen, a surname
