= Nicolas Ghesquière =

French fashion designer (born 1971)

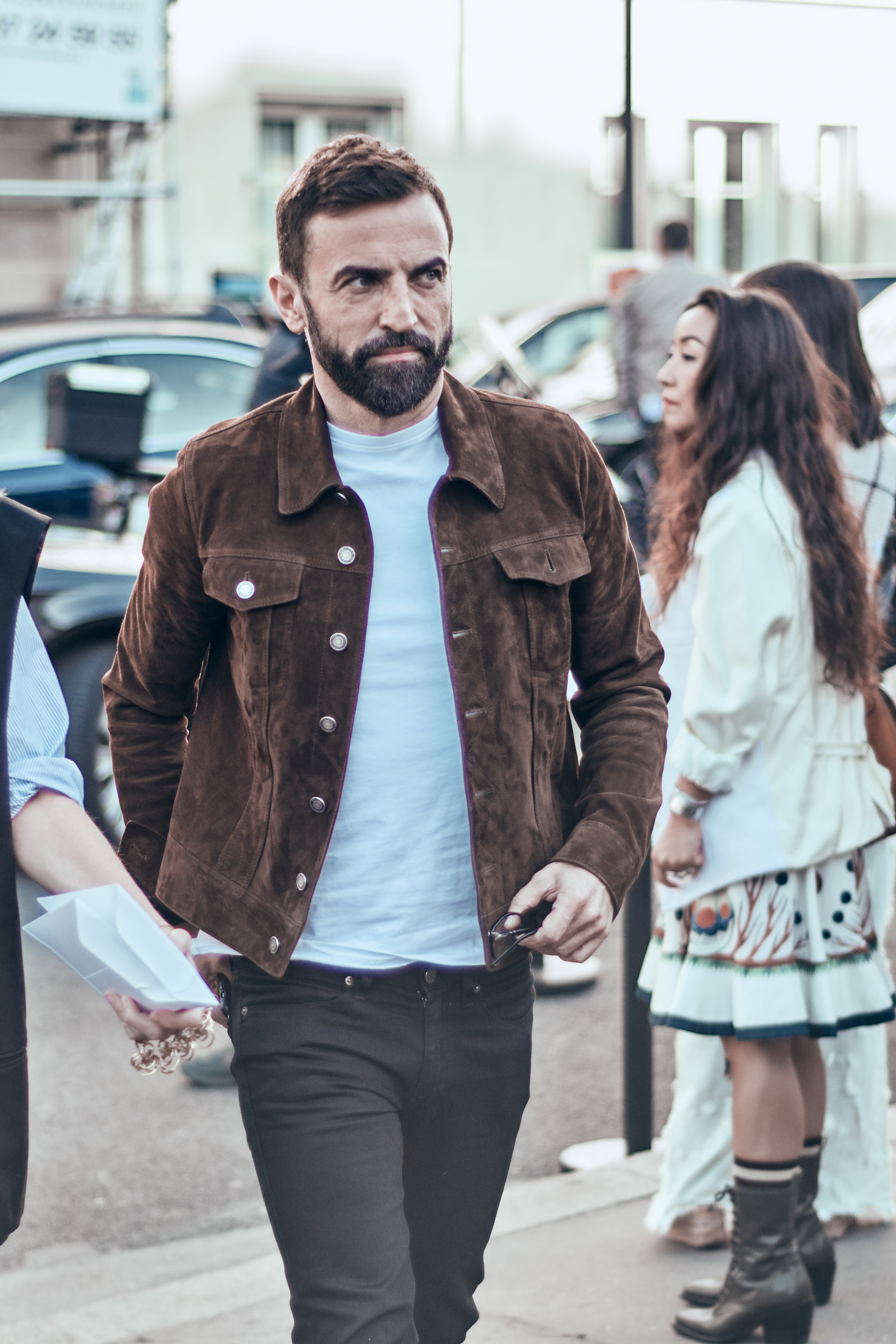
- Ghesquière in 2019
- Born: 9 May 1971 (age 55); Comines, Nord-Pas de Calais, France
- Occupations: Creative Director, Fashion designer
- Years active: 1990–present
- Label: Louis Vuitton

Nicolas Ghesquière (French pronunciation: [nikɔla ʒɛskjɛʁ]; born 9 May 1971) is a French-Belgian fashion designer who has been the Artistic Director of Women’s Collections of the Maison of Louis Vuitton (owned by LVMH) since 2013.

== Early life ==
Ghesquière was born in Comines, Nord, the younger of two sons of a Francophone Belgian golf-course owner and manager in the 7,500-inhabitant Poitevine town of Loudun and a French mother, who enjoyed fashion. He grew up in Loudun, Vienne. From a young age, Ghesquière enjoyed and practiced sports, such as horse riding, fencing, and swimming, and, in fact, many of his collections today use that inspiration, most notably his scuba mini dresses and his equestrian-inspired fall/winter 2006 ready-to-wear collection.

At a young age Ghesquière announced at that he wanted to be a designer. He now admits this was partly from an adolescent desire to do something different from his parents and to alleviate country boredom. By the age of 12, Nicolas was sketching dress designs in his school books, making dresses out of his mother's curtains, and designing earrings out of his grandmother's chandelier crystals.

With the help of his father, Ghesquière put together a portfolio of drawings and sent it, along with a letter introducing himself, to several designers. He diligently did internships during his school holidays. At 14, he assumed an internship with French designer agnès b, for which he was paid in clothes. His next apprenticeship was with Corinne Cobson. He decided afterward that fashion was difficult and returned home to finish his schooling.

== Career ==
After graduating from high school at age 18, Ghesquière turned down a place at art school to work as an assistant to designer Jean-Paul Gaultier from 1990 to 1992. He went on to work at Pôles, designing its knitwear line followed by a series of inauspicious assignments with different companies. He was considered the unofficial designer for the Italian house of Callaghan.

=== Balenciaga ===
Through his contacts with Marie-Amélie Sauvé and Nathalie Marrec, Ghesquière eventually landed a job doing the licensing for Paris fashion house Balenciaga and designing for the Asian market. At that time, Balenciaga had limited success since the 1970s and was owned by Groupe Jacques Bogart, whose management realized Ghesquière's talent when he designed a small collection for one of its Japanese licensees. (The label's founder, Cristóbal Balenciaga, died in 1972.) Ghesquière held, as he then described it, "what many would call the worst position in fashion," designing suits and funeral clothes under a Balenciaga licence for Japan.

In 1997, at the young age of 25, Ghesquière was the surprise choice to head Balenciaga, promoted to creative director of Balenciaga after his Dutch predecessor Josephus Thimister was fired following a highly unsuccessful show. In this capacity, he was put in charge of the brand's entire image, from clothing and accessories to store design and advertising. Following his appointment, he had less than four months to design the spring-summer 1998 collection from scratch.

While working as the label's creative director, Ghesquière continued to design two Italian collections — Trussardi, then Callaghan — until 2001. Callaghan's Spring 2001 Ready-to-Wear show was the first ever in New York for the then 35-year-old fashion house, and also served as the US debut for Ghesquière.

In 2002, Ghesquière was embroiled in controversy when he was accused of plagiarizing from a deceased designer. Ghesquière was forced to admit that he had copied a patchwork vest from San Francisco designer Kaisik Wong — who died in 1990 — for the Balenciaga Spring/Summer 2002 collection. The design by Wong appeared in a 1974 reference book, Native Funk & Flash. Ghesquière said, "I'm very flattered that people are looking at my sources of inspiration. This is how I work. I've always said I'm looking at vintage clothes."

At Balenciaga, Ghesquière soon became known for his sense of contrast, such as pairing high-waisted skinny pants with a voluminous blouson or a tightly cut wool jumpsuit with billowing sleeves. His work soon turned Balenciaga into a critically acclaimed fashion house. His biggest commercial success was the Lariat bag, with braided handles and dangling zipper pulls. An aspect of the designer's devotion to the house's legacy was his respect for Cristóbal Balenciaga's original design concepts. However, even though the Balenciaga archives are stored in Ghesquière's atelier, he was only able to gain entry to the locked room by special appointment with an off-site custodian. Throughout his time at Balenciaga, Ghesquière continuously collaborated with the same artists, particularly French artist Dominique Gonzalez-Foerster – who worked with Ghesquière on the design of every Balenciaga boutique – and stylist Marie-Amélie Sauvé. He has additionally cited actress Charlotte Gainsbourg as an influence during his time at the company. At the same time, he launched the careers of several models, including Kirstin Liljegren. Ghesquière's lariat bag is now considered a modern classic.

The Gucci Group (PPR) bought Balenciaga in 2001. Ghesquière, who wanted to stay and expand Balenciaga, could only be bought through the house. "It is a happy relationship," Ghesquière said. "It has worked because they wanted me to explain what I wanted to do with Balenciaga, not the other way around." Ghesquière's collections have had a considerable commercial impact, particularly through his influence on other designers, including his former staff members Julien Dossena, Camille Miceli, and Natacha Ramsay-Levi. During his 15-year tenure at Balenciaga, Ghesquière is widely credited with having helped turn the fashion label into one of the fastest-growing and most profitable brands of parent PPR. During that time, he assembled one of the largest production teams in Paris with upwards of 30 people in the design studio and 50 in the fabrication ateliers.

In November 2012, Nicolas Ghesquière left Balenciaga to general astonishment . A painful legal dispute for Nicolas Ghesquière ensued. On November 23, 2022, Nicolas Ghesquière gave the explanation during the scandal of the advertising campaign of children posing in a BDSM scene, "When I left @kering in 2012 I felt disconnected and hurt by [their] values and dishonesty".

=== Louis Vuitton ===
On 4 November 2013, Ghesquière officially replaced Marc Jacobs at Louis Vuitton as creative director for the women's collections. Some of his first designs for Louis Vuitton debuted on the red carpet, as worn by the actress Jennifer Connelly. On 5 March 2014, Ghesquière had his first show under the LV brand. LVMH renewed Ghesquière’s contract as artistic director of the women's collections in 2018 and 2022.

Since joining Louis Vuiton, Ghesquière has regularly showcased his designs with shows in architectural landmarks including the Louvre in Paris – it was the first time the museum had allowed a fashion house to stage a show there –; Monaco's Palace Square (2014); Hope Residence in Palm Springs (2015); the Niterói Contemporary Art Museum in Rio de Janeiro (2016); the Miho Museum near Kyoto (2017); Fondation Maeght in Saint-Paul de Vence (2018); and the TWA Flight Center (2019).

Ghesquière designed a series of character skins for the video game League of Legends in 2019.

On May 22, 2025, Nicolas Ghesquière presented Louis Vuitton's Cruise 2026 collection at the Palais des Papes in Avignon

Actress Emma Stone is a longtime friend of Nicolas Ghesquière, and Nicolas designed her wedding dresses.

== Recognition ==
In 1998, Madonna wore Balenciaga’s gothic-chic dress to the Golden Globes and was named avant-garde designer of the year at the VH1/Vogue Fashion Awards. A year later, he was named Womenswear Designer of the Year by the CFDA. In 2006, he was among the TIME 100 Most Influential People. Two years later, he was named Designer of the Year at the Accessories Council Excellence Awards. Ghesquière was described as "fashion's most sought-after and influential figure" by American Vogue and was also cited as the International Designer of the Year in 2014 by the British Fashion Awards.

== Personal life ==
In his twenties, Ghesquière was in a seven-year relationship with Pierre Hardy. Subsequently, he dated James Kaliardos, a makeup artist and cofounder of Visionaire, for eight years. More recently, he was in relationships with fellow designer Julien Dossena and blogger Pelayo Díaz.

He has been in a relationship with his partner Drew Kuhse since early 2020. They live between Paris and Kuhse’s hometown, Los Angeles.

In 2022, Ghesquière acquired John Lautner’s Wolff House in Los Angeles for $11 million from Amanda Hearst in an off-market deal.
