= William Gourley =

William Gourley may refer to:

- William H. Gourley (1933–2008), United States Army general
- William D. Gourley (1937–2014), American football coach and sportscaster
