= Hampshire High School (Illinois) =

Location
- 1600 Big Timber Road; Hampshire, Kane, Illinois 60140; United States; 42.1228°N 88.498521°W

Information
- School type: High school
- Motto: Be Respectful Be Responsible Be involved
- Established: 1838; 188 years ago (first high school); 2008 (current facility)
- School district: D300
- Superintendent: Martina Smith
- Dean: Spencer Brown
- Principal: Patrick Hardy
- Teaching staff: 121.42 (FTE)
- Grades: 9-12
- Student to teacher ratio: 16.10
- Hours in school day: 7 hours, 13 minutes
- Campus type: Rural
- Colors: Purple and white
- Slogan: Go! Fight! Win! Whip-purs!
- Fight song: We're Loyal To You Hampshire High
- Athletics conference: Fox Valley Conference All Conference football: #61 Nico #47 Duff
- Mascot: Whip-Pur
- Nickname: Whips
- Rival: Burlington Central Rockets
- Newspaper: Whip-Pur Tails
- Yearbook: The HighLighter
- Feeder schools: Hampshire Middle School, Dundee Middle School, Cambridge Lakes Charter School
- Website: hhs.d300.org

Hampshire High School (Illinois) (commonly referred to as Hampshire or HHS) is a public high school for students in grades 9 through 12 located in Hampshire, Illinois, United States. It serves students from Hampshire and surrounding areas, including Gilberts, Pingree Grove, Carpentersville, Elgin, and Sleepy Hollow. The school is located at the northern edge of Hampshire.

Hampshire High School is part of Community Unit School District 300, or D300, and is the newest of three high schools serving the district. Feeder schools to Hampshire include Hampshire Middle School and Dundee Middle School. The school is a member of the Illinois High School Association, Fox Valley Conference.

The school colors are purple and white, and the mascot is a Whippur, which is typically depicted as a panther or a puma. Students created the mascot in the 1940s, years before the State Street building was constructed.

== History ==
During the mid-19th century, nine one-room schoolhouses were built in Hampshire Township. These schools served all grade levels until 1838, when a high school and grade school was built at State Street and Mill Street in downtown.

After the school burned down in 1851, it was rebuilt in the same location. The nine one-room schoolhouses served as grade schools into the 20th century.

In 1896, a square brick high school was constructed. Additions added to the capacity of the school and it remained Hampshire High School until a new building was constructed on South State Street. Stairs from the old high school can still be seen.

All Hampshire schools joined Carpentersville-based District 300 in 1948.

Planning for the combined Hampshire High School and Middle School began in 1950. The school officially opened on Friday, September 5, 1952. That building was 32,098 square feet (2,982.0 m^{2}). It opened with 105 high school students, 46 boys and 59 girls, as well as 58 middle school students, 32 boys and 26 girls. The main sports gym was not finished until January 1953. 1,000 people attended the first open house of the new gym.

The first football field was added in 1964, when Ronald Ellett started the football program at Hampshire High School. In 1994, Ellett was inducted into the Illinois High School Coaches' Hall of Fame. During his tenure as coach, he guided the Whippurs to four conference titles, two State Championships and a State Runner-Up. Ellett was also the high school baseball coach, and led the baseball team to their first District Championship in 1977.

In 2008 the newest Hampshire High School building was built on 103 acres (0.42 km^{2}) of former Tamms family farmland. The old school building became the middle school exclusively.

== Demographics ==
The demographic breakdown of Hampshire High School's 1,927 students enrolled in 2022-2023 was:

- White - 59.6%
- Hispanic - 25.1%
- Asian - 7.4%
- Black - 3.5%
- Other - 4.4%

16.8% of students were classified as low income.

== Facility ==
The current Hampshire High School building's construction was completed in 2008, ready for the 2008-09 school year, although it was late. The building cost around $70 million and remains the newest high school in District 300. The new site was created to support the exponential population growth in surrounding areas.

The new Hampshire High School contains 7,500,000 cubic feet (210,000 m^{3}) under roof and includes 65 traditional classrooms, 11 musical rooms, 5 art rooms, 13 science labs, three business labs, five industrial arts rooms, three family and consumer science labs, 8,100 library books, 75 lunch tables, 2,500 seat competition gym, indoor track, 750 seat auditorium, six computer labs, 1,200 data drops, 76 miles (122 km) of network cable, 48 wireless access points, and 89 cameras.

Many of the classrooms are equipped with SmartBoards and every room has a projector, camera, and DVD/VHS player. When at full capacity, HHS is expected to be able to accommodate around 2500 students. However, this maximum is still years off due to the slowing of neighborhood building.

Capacity
Auditorium - 750
Main competition gym - 2500
Field house - 1900
Commons - 900
Classrooms - about 35-45
Lecture hall - 100

== Safety ==
Hampshire High School is filled with surveillance cameras throughout the school grounds. This feature allows administrators to view nearly every inch of the building. A police officer is officially on duty at the school. Emergency buttons are placed within the halls, and call buttons are in every classroom.

== Schedule ==
Hampshire High School utilizes period scheduling. Students attend nine classes a semester, two semesters a year. All District 300 high schools use the period format.

A school day goes as follows:

1st period (7:30-8:15)
2nd period (8:20-9:05)
3rd period (9:10-9:58)
4th period (10:03-10:48)
5th period (10:53-11:38)
6th period (11:43-12:28)
7th period (12:33-1:18)
8th period (1:23-2:08)
9th period (2:13-2:58)

Each of the nine classes are 45 minutes long with 5-minute passing periods. Each passing period ends with a "Musical Minute" where a variety of popular songs are chosen and played. An extra 3 minutes during the 3rd period is to account for time lost in class due to announcements. The total school day lasts for seven hours and 23 minutes. Starting in the 2022-2023 school year, late starts were implemented in place of the early releases where once a month, or in case of severe weather, the school day starts at 9:30, but ends at the usual 2:58. Classes are shortened to 32 minutes and passing periods are five minutes.

A late start day goes as follows:

1st period (9:30-10:02)
2nd period (10:07-10:39)
3rd period (10:44-11:16)
4th period (11:21-11:53)
5th period (11:58-12:30)
6th period (12:35-1:07)
7th period (1:12-1:44)
8th period (1:49-2:21)
9th period (2:26-2:58)

== Industrial arts ==
On the far west side of the building is the industrial arts wing. There one can find a Computer Aided Design (CAD) lab, electricity lab, wood lab, welding lab, autos lab, and advanced manufacturing lab. The CAD lab features new widescreen computers with AutoDesk AutoCAD 2010 and Google SketchUp installed. The wood lab is home to a state-of-the-art SawStop table saw which is usually not found in schools due to the $10,000 price tag. In addition, there are about $7,000 worth of Bosch tools and a $30,000 ShopBot CNC machine. On the east side behind the auditorium is the scene shop, which is used to fabricate all of the sets required for school plays.

== Athletics ==
Conference: Fox Valley

Arena names: Main Gym and Field House

Sports teams
Boys

- Baseball
- Basketball
- Cross country
- Football
- Golf
- Hockey (club sport)
- Lacrosse
- Soccer
- Tennis
- Track and field
- Wrestling

Girls

- Basketball
- Cheerleading
- Cross country
- Golf
- Lacrosse
- Poms
- Soccer
- Softball
- Tennis
- Track and field
- Volleyball

Competitive clubs

- Academic Challenge
- Debate Team
- Math Team
- Scholastic Bowl
- Skills USA

Non-competitive clubs

- Art Club
- Asian American and Pacific Islander Club
- ASL Club
- Chess Club
- Barbell Club
- Black Student Alliance
- Book Club
- Business Club
- Drama Club
- Environmental Club
- Fellowship of Christian Athletes
- Fishing Club
- French Club
- Future Educators Club
- Gender and Sexualities Alliance
- Journalism Club
- Literary Magazine
- Medical Careers Club
- Musical
- National Honors Society
- Robotics Club
- Spanish Club
- Student Ambassadors
- Student Council
- Tri-M
- Videogamers
- Yearbook

== State championships ==
- Chess team: State Runner-up: 1979 (Coach John Krewer)
- Football: State Champs: 1976 (Coach Ronald Ellett)
- Football: State Runner-up: 1978 (Coach Ronald Ellett)
- Football: State Champions 1979 (Coach Ronald Ellett)
- Football: State Champions 1995 (Coach Dan Cavenaugh)
- Girls' basketball: 3rd Place-State 2003 (Coach Milt Awe)
- Girls' basketball: State Runner Up 2004 (Coach Sue Ellett)
- Girls' soccer: 4th Place-State 2007 (Coach Patrick O'Brien)
- Girls' soccer: Runner-up: 2008 (Coach Patrick O'Brien)
- Girls' volleyball: Runner-up: 2007
- Girls' track: Natalie Salinas- Discuss 4th Place-State 1999, Discuss 2nd Place-State 2000, and Discus State Champ 2001; Erin Salinas - Discus State Champ 2002
- Boys' track: Quinn Walker- 300 M Hurdles State Champ 2008
- Girls' golf: Connie Ellett- State Runner-up 2011
- Girls' varsity cheer: 2015 State Champions (Coach Rachael Fischer)
- Certiport MOS Championships: Microsoft Excel (Office 2019): Quinn Hanson - 2025 State Champion (Finished 10th in the nation)

== Math team ==
In 2010 and 2011, the HHS math team came in third place in the Big Northern Conference. Awards have included first-place finishes in the subjects of Geometry, Calculus, and Algebra.

== National Honor Society ==
The National Honor Society, or NHS, is a major part of HHS. For the 2023-24 school year more than 70 students were inducted into NHS. NHS consists of volunteer work and school improvement. Students in NHS must fulfill a 60-hour minimum of community service.

== Fight song ==
We're loyal to you, Hampshire High

We're purple and white, Hampshire High

We'll back you to stand against the best in the land

For we know you've got sand, Hampshire High (Rah! Rah!)

So, let's get that ball, Hampshire High

We're backing you all, Hampshire High

Our team is the famed protector

Our team, for we expect a

Victory, for you Hampshire High
