= Mike Watson (American football) =

American football coach

Coaching career (HC unless noted)
- 1973–1974: North Park
- 1975–1978: Minnehaha Academy
- 1978–2010: Centennial HS (MN)
- 2013–2016: Centennial HS (MN) (AC/DC)

Head coaching record
- Overall: 6–12

Mike Watson is an American former football coach. He served as the head football coach at North Park College—now known as North Park University—in Chicago for two seasons, from 1973 to 1974, compiling a record of 6–12.

== Head coaching record ==
Year	Team	Overall	Conference	Standing	Bowl/playoffs
North Park Vikings (College Conference of Illinois and Wisconsin) (1973–1974)
1973	North Park	3–6	2–6	T–7th	
1974	North Park	3–6	2–6	7th	
North Park:		6–12	4–12		
Total:		6–12			
