= Bill Anderson (American football, born 1947) =

American football player and coach (born 1947)

Biographical details
- Born: January 13, 1947 (age 79)

Playing career
- c. 1967: North Park

Coaching career (HC unless noted)
- 1978–1985: North Park
- 1986–1994: Illinois College

Head coaching record
- Overall: 46–107

William Anderson (born January 13, 1947) is an American former college football player and coach. He served as the head football coach at North Park University from 1978 to 1985 and at Illinois College from 1986 to 1994, compiling a career head coaching record of 46–107. Anderson played football for four seasons at North Park before graduating in 1969. In addition to coaching football at North Park, he also chaired the physical education department.

== Head coaching record ==
Year	Team	Overall	Conference	Standing	Bowl/playoffs
North Park Vikings (College Conference of Illinois and Wisconsin) (1978–1985)
1978	North Park	0–9	0–8	9th	
1979	North Park	4–5	4–4	6th	
1980	North Park	3–6	2–6	7th	
1981	North Park	2–7	1–7	8th	
1982	North Park	1–8	1–7	8th	
1983	North Park	3–6	2–6	8th	
1984	North Park	0–9	0–8	9th	
1985	North Park	2–7	2–6	T–6th	
North Park:		15–57	12–52		
Illinois College Blueboys (Midwest Conference) (1986–1994)
1986	Illinois College	1–8	0–7	6th (South)	
1987	Illinois College	1–8	0–7	6th (South)	
1988	Illinois College	4–5	2–5	3rd (South)	
1989	Illinois College	6–3	4–3	2nd (South)	
1990	Illinois College	4–5	2–5	3rd (South)	
1991	Illinois College	2–7	0–5	4th (South)	
1992	Illinois College	5–4	2–3	2nd (South)	
1993	Illinois College	3–6	1–4	3rd (South)	
1994	Illinois College	5–4	1–4	T–3rd (South)	
Illinois College:		31–50	12–43		
Total:		46–107			
