= Ron Ellett =

American football player and coach (born 1942)

Biographical details
- Born: 1942 (age 83–84)

Playing career
- 1960–1963: Eastern Illinois
- Position: Quarterback

Coaching career (HC unless noted)
- 1986: North Park

Head coaching record
- Overall: 0–9 (college)

Ronald Ellett (born 1942) is a retired American football coach.

== Early life and playing career ==
Ronald Ellett was born in 1942 in Indiana, the son of H. Archie Ellett and Frances Elizabeth Ellett. Ellett's grandfather was James Fred Ellett, the son of Willis A. Gorman Ellett. Willis was the son of David Ellett whose father was Edward Ellett, Sr. the founder of Ellettsville, Indiana.

Ellett came from a successful high school football program. Jamaica High School was undefeated when he was a senior in 1959. Ellett earned 13 letters at Jamaica, four in baseball and three each in football, basketball and track. He was a Little All-State selection in football by the Chicago Daily News and earned special mention all-state recognition in basketball. As a senior, Ellett was the Vermilion County scoring leader in both football and basketball. He went on to Eastern Illinois University, where he lettered in football for three years, the amount of time it took Ellett to earn his degree. At Eastern Illinois University he played quarterback primarily running the shotgun offense. In 2009 Ellett was recognized as the best athlete to have ever played a Jamaica High School by the Champaign News Gazette.

== Coaching career ==
=== High school ===
Ellett started the football program at Hampshire High School in Hampshire, Illinois in 1964. During his tenure Ellett guided the Whippurs to five conference titles, two state championships, and one finish as state runner-up. Ellett was also the baseball coach at Hampshire and led the baseball team to its first district championship in 1977. He then went to Elgin High School in Elgin, Illinois as head coach for one year while guiding the football team to a conference championship and its first football state playoff berth in school history. Ellett then accepted a position as head college at North Park College.

In 1994, Ellett was inducted into the Illinois High School Coaches' Hall of Fame. On May 12, 2012, Ellett's former players from Hampshire High School held a banquet in his honor where he received several standing ovations for his efforts and compassion as a coach.

=== North Park ===
Ellett was the head football coach at North Park College—now known as North Park University—in Chicago. He held that position for the 1986 season. His coaching record at North Park was 0–9. Ellett then retired from coaching and became a home builder.

== Family ==
Ellett is the grandfather of fourteen and the father of three sons and a daughter. His oldest son, Ronald J. Ellett, is an attorney in Phoenix Arizona. Doug Ellett followed in his father's footsteps as a high school teacher and successful coach. The youngest son, Matthew Ellett, is also a successful High school coach, home builder, and developer, while the daughter, Amy Ellett Johnson, is an elementary school teacher for over 30 years.

== Head coaching record ==
=== College ===
Year	Team	Overall	Conference	Standing	Bowl/playoffs
North Park Vikings (College Conference of Illinois and Wisconsin) (1986)
1986	North Park	0–9	0–8	9th	
North Park:		0–9	0–8		
Total:		0–9			
