= James Rooney (American football) =

American football coach

Coaching career (HC unless noted)
- 1964–1966: North Park

Head coaching record
- Overall: 2–21–1

James "Pat" 'Rooney was an American football coach. He served as the head football coach at North Park College—now known as North Park University—in Chicago for three seasons, from 1964 to 1966, compiling a record of 2–21–1.

== Head coaching record ==
Year	Team	Overall	Conference	Standing	Bowl/playoffs
North Park Vikings (College Conference of Illinois) (1964–1966)
1964	North Park	0–8	0–6	7th	
1965	North Park	2–6	1–5	7th	
1966	North Park	0–7–1	0–6	7th	
North Park:		2–21–1	1–17		
Total:		2–21–1			
