= Dean Loucks =

American football player and coach (1935–2014)

Biographical details
- Born: July 15, 1935; White Plains, New York, U.S.
- Died: October 17, 2014 (aged 79); White Plains, New York, U.S.

Playing career
- 1954–1956: Yale
- Position: Quarterback

Coaching career (HC unless noted)
- 1960–1968: White Plains HS (NY)
- 1970–1971: Iona (assistant)
- 1972–1974: Fordham

Head coaching record
- Overall: 14–14–1 (college)

Glenn Dean Loucks (July 15, 1935 – October 17, 2014) was an American football player and coach. He was head coach at Fordham University from 1972 to 1974, with a record of 14–14–1, and played quarterback for Yale as a member of the Class of 1957. Loucks died in 2014 at the age of 79.

== Head coaching record ==
=== College ===
Year	Team	Overall	Conference	Standing	Bowl/playoffs
Fordham Rams (Metropolitan Intercollegiate Conference) (1972–1974)
1972	Fordham	5–5	NA	NA	
1973	Fordham	6–4	2–2	3rd	
1974	Fordham	3–5–1	0–3–1	5th	
Fordham:		14–14–1	2–5–1		
Total:		14–14–1			
