= North Park Vikings football =

College football team

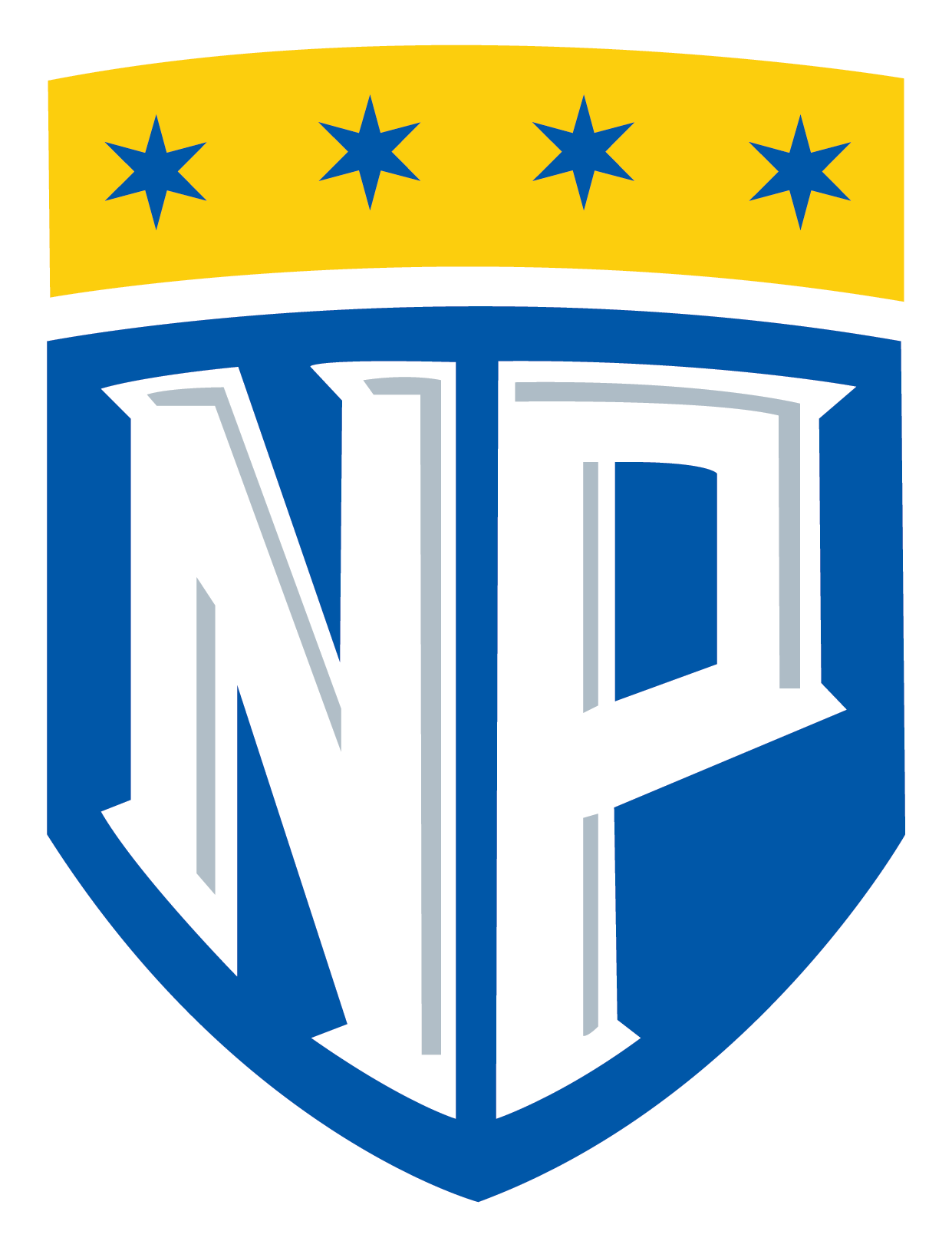
- First season: 1899; 127 years ago*
- Athletic director: John Born
- Head coach: Kyle Rooker; 7th season, 17–43 (.283)
- Location: Chicago, Illinois
- Stadium: Holmgren Athletic Complex (capacity: 3,000)
- NCAA division: Division III
- Conference: CCIW
- Colors: Royal blue and gold
- Rivalries: Augustana
- Mascot: Vikings
- Website: athletics.northpark.edu

The North Park Vikings football team represents North Park University in college football at the NCAA Division III level. The Vikings are members of the College Conference of Illinois and Wisconsin (CCIW), fielding its team in the CCIW since 1962 when it was known as the College Conference of Illinois. The Vikings play their home games at the Holmgren Athletic Complex in North Park, Chicago. The team's head coach is Kyle Rooker, a College of Wooster graduate and linebacker from 1997–2000. He was formally the associate head coach at Carthage College who took over the position starting the 2019 season.

== History ==
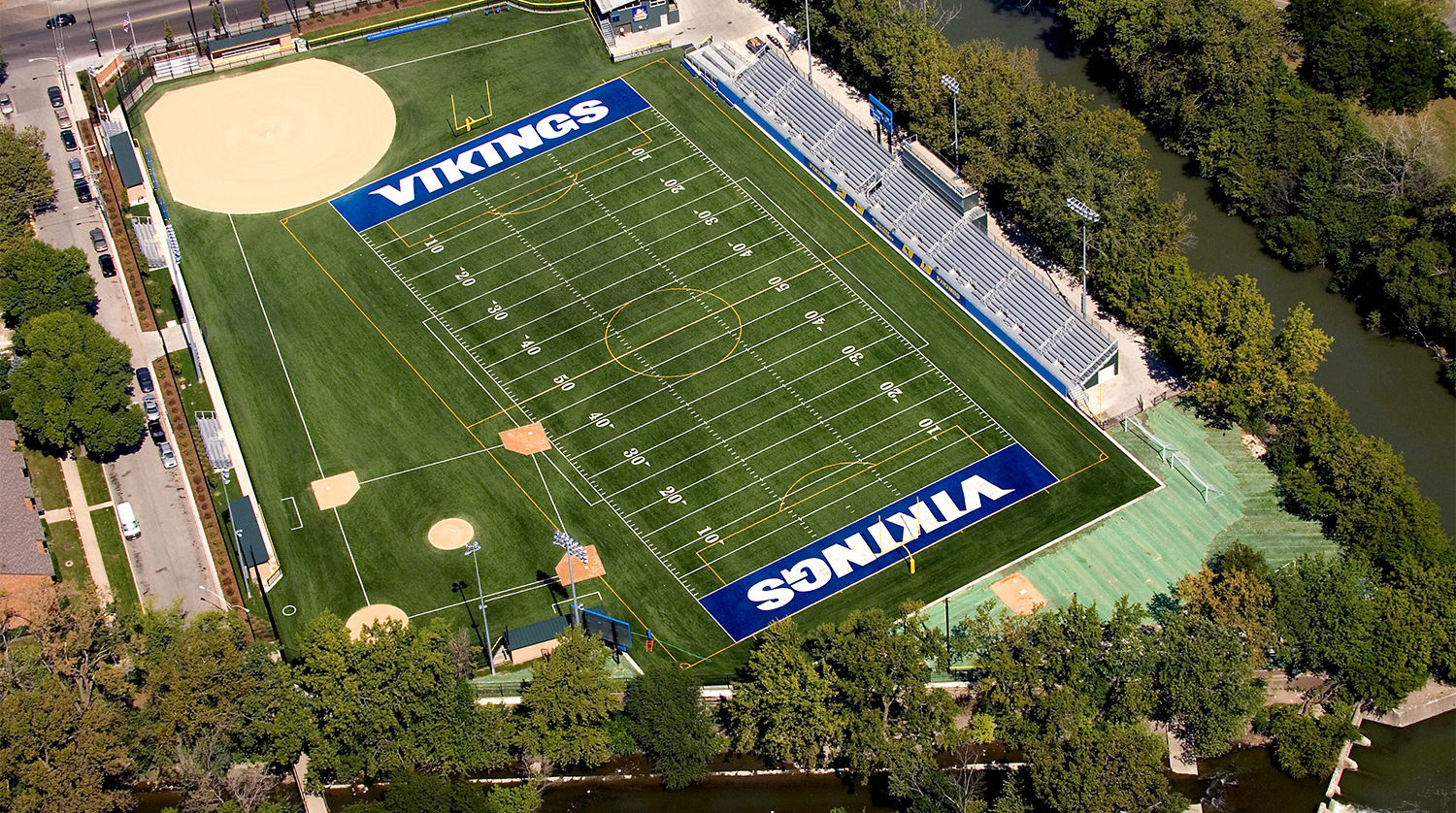
Holmgren Athletic Complex

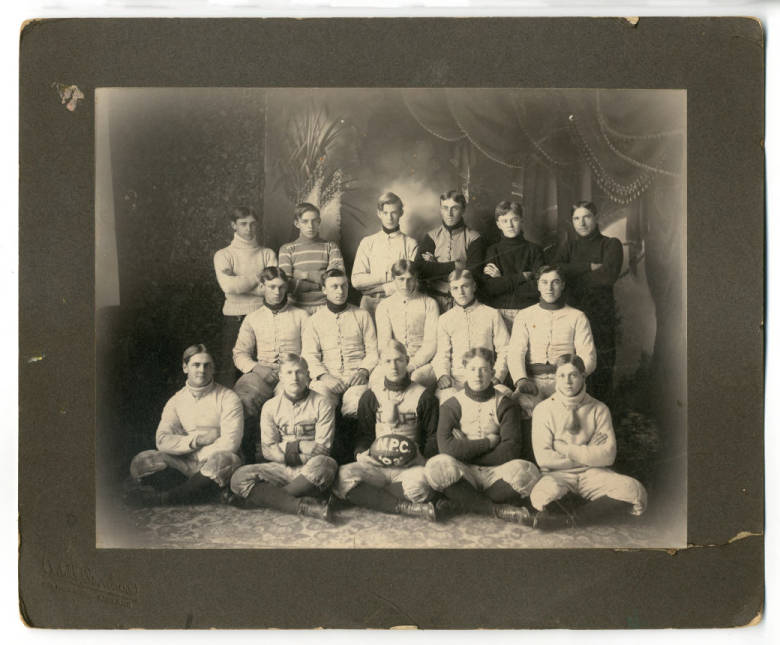
1903 football squad

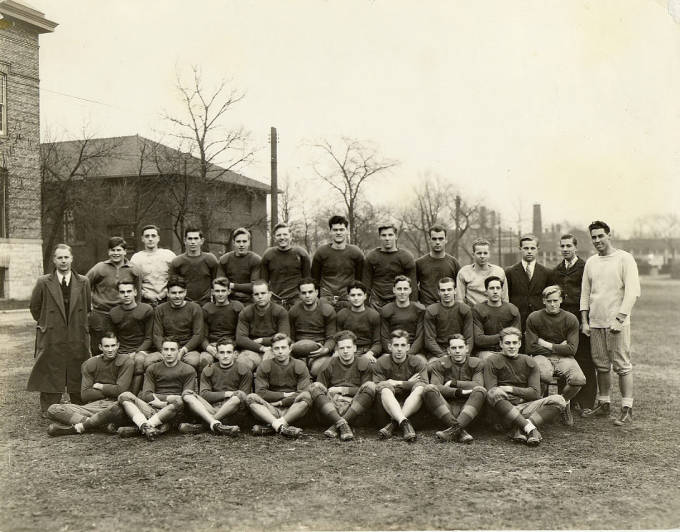
Team c. 1936

The school, formally known as North Park Junior College, fielded a football team starting in 1899. Playing their first game and losing to North Division High School, now known as Lincoln Park High School, on October 21. The 1903 squad would be the last until 1934 as the 1904 Covenant meeting directed the college to disband all athletics and activities that were “offensive to Christians.” Prior to playing at their current complex, the Vikings used to play home games at a variety of venues. Including various parks and fields around the city, including Winnemac Stadium, now "Jorndt Field" at Amundsen High School. In 1942 the Vikings would have an undefeated season, going 5–0–1. The veracity of the statistics are debated as two separate games were forfeited by what is now Wilbur Wright College for unknown reasons. The team additionally had a draw with Morton College to close the season.

Since joining the College Conference of Illinois in 1962, North Park has never reached the NCAA Division III playoffs. The program also has no conference or regular season championships. Since the 1960s the university has historically struggled to field a competitive team, even going twelve straight seasons without a conference win between 2001 and 2012. The Vikings were the conference runner-up once in 1968, tying for second place with Illinois Wesleyan University. That same year on October 12th the Vikings defeated North Central College in a 100+ point game with a score of 104–32. One of only eight such college football games since 1960. Since the NCAA started tracking records, it was the highest scoring college football game by two teams (136) until 2007 when Weber State defeated Portland State 73–68 (141).

The Vikings managed to reach an even overall record of (.500) during both the 2023 and 2024 season. The first of its kind since 1993.

== Conference affiliation ==
- Independent (1899–1903, 1934–1961)
- CCIW (1962–present)

Year	Coach	Overall	Conference	Standing	Bowl/playoffs
North Park Vikings (Independent) (1899–1961)
1899	Unknown				
1900	Unknown				
1901	Unknown				
1902	Unknown				
1903	Unknown				
1904 – 1933	No team				
1934	Unknown	0–1–1			
1935	Unknown	1–3–3			
1936	Unknown	2–2–2			
1937	Unknown	4–3–0			
1938	Unknown	4–2–1			
1939	Unknown	3–3–1			
1940	Unknown	2–6			
1941	Unknown	5–4			
1942	Unknown	5–0–1			
1943	No team—World War II				
1944	Unknown	0–1			
1945	Unknown	0–3–2			
1946	Unknown	2–3			
1947	Unknown	1–3–2			
1948	Unknown	2–3–2			
1949	Unknown	0–7			
1950	Unknown	0–7			
1951	Unknown	1–4–2			
1952	Unknown	2–5			
1953	Unknown	2–4–1			
1954	Unknown	2–4–1			
1955	Unknown	1–7			
1956	Unknown	4–4			
1957	Unknown	3–5			
1958	Harold Swanson	7–1			
1959	Harold Swanson	6–1–1			
1960	Harold Swanson	4–5			
1961	Bob Lord	3–5			
North Park Vikings (College Conference of Illinois) (1962–1966)
1962	Bob Lord	2–6	1–6	7th	
1963	Bob Lord	1–7	0–6	7th	
1964	James Rooney	0–8	0–6	7th	
1965	James Rooney	1–6	1–5	7th	
1966	James Rooney	0–7–1	0–6	7th	
North Park Vikings (College Conference of Illinois and Wisconsin) (1967–present)
1967	Norm Rathje	3–6	1–5	5th	
1968	Norm Rathje	6–3	5–2	2nd	
1969	Charles Emery	2–7	2–5	7th	
1970	William Gourley	2–6–1	2–5–1	7th	
1971	William Gourley	4–5	4–4	T–5th	
1972	William Gourley	2–6–1	2–5–1	7th	
1973	Mike Watson	3–6	2–6	7th	
1974	Mike Watson	3–6	2–6	7th	
1975	Gene Mitz	1–8	1–7	9th	
1976	Gene Mitz	1–8	0–8	9th	
1977	Gene Mitz	0–9	0–8	9th	
1978	Bill Anderson	0–9	0–8	9th	
1979	Bill Anderson	4–5	4–4	6th	
1980	Bill Anderson	3–6	2–6	7th	
1981	Bill Anderson	2–7	2–6	8th	
1982	Bill Anderson	1–8	1–7	8th	
1983	Bill Anderson	3–6	2–6	8th	
1984	Bill Anderson	0–9	0–8	9th	
1985	Bill Anderson	2–7	2–6	T–6th	
1986	Ron Ellett	0–9	0–8	9th	
1987	Craig Fouhy	0–9	0–8	9th	
1988	Craig Fouhy	1–8	1–7	9th	
1989	Mel Boehland	1–8	1–7	9th	
1990	Tim Rucks	1–8	1–7	8th	
1991	Tim Rucks	0–9	0–8	9th	
1992	Tim Rucks	1–6–2	1–4–2	6th	
1993	Tim Rucks	4–4	2–4	5th	
1994	Tim Rucks	3–6	1–6	7th	
1995	Mike Liljegren	2–7	1–6	8th	
1996	Mike Liljegren	0–9	0–7	8th	
1997	Mike Liljegren	0–9	0–7	8th	
1998	Mike Liljegren	2–7	1–6	T–6th	
1999	Mike Liljegren	2–7	1–6	T–7th	
2000	Mike Liljegren	3–7	1–6	T–6th	
2001	Robin Cooper	2–8	0–7	8th	
2002	Robin Cooper	1–9	0–7	8th	
2003	Robin Cooper	2–8	0–7	8th	
2004	Robin Cooper	1–9	0–7	8th	
2005	Robin Cooper	3–7	0–7	8th	
2006	Scott Pethtel	1–9	0–7	8th	
2007	Scott Pethtel	1–9	0–7	8th	
2008	Scott Pethtel	1–9	0–7	8th	
2009	Scott Pethtel	1–9	0–7	8th	
2010	Scott Pethtel	2–8	0–7	8th	
2011	Scott Pethtel	3–7	0–7	8th	
2012	Scott Pethtel	1–9	0–7	8th	
2013	Mike Conway	3–7	3–4	T–4th	
2014	Mike Conway	2–8	2–5	T–5th	
2015	Mike Conway	3–7	2–5	6th	
2016	Mike Conway	1–9	0–8	9th	
2017	Mike Conway	3–7	2–6	T–6th	
2018	Mike Conway	2–8	1–8	9th	
2019	Kyle Rooker	1–9	1–8	T–8th	
2020–21	No team—COVID-19				
2021	Kyle Rooker	2–8	2–7	9th	
2022	Kyle Rooker	1–9	1–8	9th	
2023	Kyle Rooker	5–5	4–5	T–5th	
2024	Kyle Rooker	5–5	4–5	T–5th	
2025	Kyle Rooker	3–7	2–7	T–8th	
2026	Kyle Rooker				
Total:		136–471–6 (.335)			
