= Craig Fouhy =

American football player, coach, and broadcaster

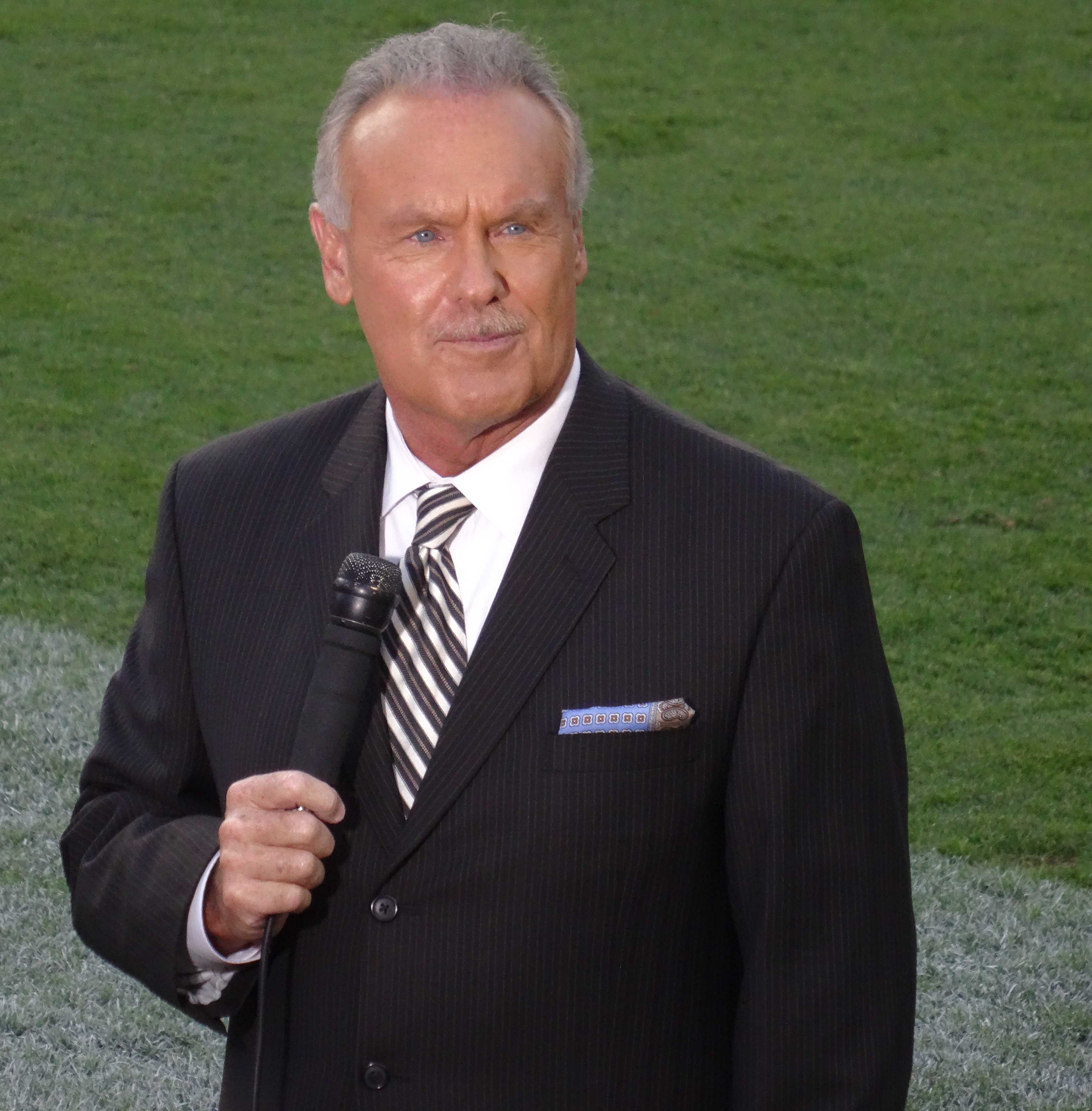
- Fouhy in 2013

Playing career
- 1972–1975: Pacific Lutheran
- Position: Offensive tackle

Coaching career (HC unless noted)
- 1976–1977: Lake Roosevelt HS (WA)
- 1978: Coupeville HS (WA)
- 1979–1981: Sumner HS (WA) (assistant)
- 1982: Montana (assistant OL)
- 1983–1984: Tahoma HS (WA)
- 1985: Montana (RB)
- 1987–1988: North Park
- 1991: Bothell HS (WA)

Head coaching record
- Overall: 1–17 (college); 16–38 (high school)

Craig Fouhy is an American sports broadcaster and former football player and coach. He is the sports director and sports anchor for KNXV-TV in Phoenix.

== Playing career ==
Fouhy played college football at Pacific Lutheran from 1972 to 1975 as a three-time All-Conference, All-District, All-West Coast, and Honorable Mention All-American offensive tackle under College Football Hall of Fame coach Frosty Westering. He was selected as a team captain and the Most Inspirational player in 1975.

== Coaching career ==
Fouhy's coaching career spanned 13 seasons in high school football and six at the college level. Near the end of his career, he also had a two-year run as a middle school basketball coach. Before entering college coaching as the assistant offensive line coach at the University of Montana in Missoula in 1982, Fouhy was an assistant and head coach on the high school level in Washington for six years, where he returned between two one-year stints with the Grizzlies. From 1987 to 1988, he compiled a 1–17 record as head football coach of at North Park College—now known as North Park University—in Chicago, where he also coached the golf team.

After a two-year tenure at North Park University, Fouhy returned to Washington, where he taught and coached basketball at Explorer Middle School from 1990–91 and coached football at Bothell High School in 1991. Prior to the 1991 season, he was named head coach of the Juanita High School football team, only to resign one week later. During his six seasons as a high school head football coach in Washington, Fouhy compiled a 16–38 (.296) record.

== Broadcasting career ==
Fouhy was hired by KNXV-TV in Phoenix in 1998 after coaching high school and college football for 18 years and middle school basketball for two. He has worked as a play-by-play announcer and color commentator for college football on television and radio. He also served as a public address announcer for the Arizona Cardinals, Milwaukee Brewers, Tacoma Pacific University, Arizona State University, and the University of Washington. He was part of the Arizona Cardinals Radio Team for five seasons in the early 2000.

== Head coaching record ==
=== College ===
Year	Team	Overall	Conference	Standing	Bowl/playoffs
North Park Vikings (College Conference of Illinois and Wisconsin) (1987–1988)
1987	North Park	0–9	0–8	9th	
1988	North Park	1–8	1–7	T–8th	
North Park:		1–17	1–15		
Total:		1–17			
