= Mike Conway (American football) =

American football coach

Biographical details
- Education: Olivet Nazarene University (BSC, 1984); Penn State University (MHE, 1994)

Playing career

Football
- ?: Olivet Nazarene
- Position: Offensive lineman

Coaching career (HC unless noted)

Football
- 1988–1994: Washington & Jefferson (DC)
- 1995: Purdue (DE)
- 1996–1999: Olivet Nazarene
- 2000: Geneva (AHC/DC/ST)
- 2001: Arkansas State (assistant)
- 2002–2012: California (PA) (assoc. HC / DC)
- 2013–2018: North Park
- 2019: Taylor (DC)
- 2023: Olivet Nazarene (interim HC)

Baseball
- 1989–1993: Washington & Jefferson

Administrative career (AD unless noted)
- 2020–2022: Olivet Nazarene

Head coaching record
- Overall: 51–64 (football); 76–56 (baseball)
- Bowls: 1–0
- Tournaments: 3–1 (NAIA playoffs)

Accomplishments and honors

Championships
- 1 MSFA Midwest League (1999)

Awards
- CCIW (2013)

Michael C. Conway is an American football coach. He was the head football coach for Olivet Nazarene University from 1996 to 1999 and in 2023, and North Park University in Chicago, Illinois from 2013 to 2018. In the fourth game his first season at North Park, in 2013, he led his team to victory in a game against Carthage. This win ended a 13-year, 89-game losing streak in College Conference of Illinois and Wisconsin (CCIW) play. In 2002, Conway was announced as the head coach of the Southwestern Moundbuilders in Winfield, Kansas to replace head coach Monty Lewis. However, he never coached a game for the school.

== Head coaching record ==
=== Football ===
Year	Team	Overall	Conference	Standing	Bowl/playoffs
Olivet Nazarene Tigers (Mid-States Football Association) (1996–1999)
1996	Olivet Nazarene	6–4	3–3	T–3rd (MWL)	
1997	Olivet Nazarene	8–3	4–2	3rd (MWL)	W Victory
1998	Olivet Nazarene	11–3	5–1	2nd (MWL)	L NAIA Championship
1999	Olivet Nazarene	6–4	5–1	T–1st (MWL)	
North Park Vikings (College Conference of Illinois and Wisconsin) (2013–2018)
2013	North Park	3–7	3–4	T–4th	
2014	North Park	2–8	2–5	T–5th	
2015	North Park	3–7	2–5	6th	
2016	North Park	1–9	0–8	9th	
2017	North Park	3–7	2–6	T–6th	
2018	North Park	2–8	1–8	9th	
North Park:		14–46	10–36		
Olivet Nazarene Tigers (Mid-States Football Association) (2023)
2023	Olivet Nazarene	6–4	3–2	3rd (MWL)	
Olivet Nazarene:		37–18	20–9		
Total:		51–64			
National championship Conference title Conference division title or championship game berth
