= Tim Rucks =

American football player and coach (1960–2015)

Biographical details
- Born: December 21, 1960; Waukegan, Illinois, U.S.
- Died: March 10, 2015 (aged 54); Kenosha, Wisconsin, U.S.

Playing career
- c. 1982: Carthage
- 1983: New York Jets
- 1984: Racine Gladiators
- 1985: Chicago Chargers
- Position: Offensive tackle

Coaching career (HC unless noted)
- 1986–1988: Niles North HS (IL) (assistant)
- 1989: North Park (assistant)
- 1990–1994: North Park
- 1995–2012: Carthage

Head coaching record
- Overall: 104–112–4
- Tournaments: 2–1 (NCAA D-III playoffs)

Accomplishments and honors

Championships
- 1 CCIW (2004)

Awards
- First-team All-CCIW (1982); CCIW Coach of the Year (2004)

Tim Rucks (December 21, 1960 – March 10, 2015) was an American football player and coach. He served as the head football coach at North Park University in Chicago, Illinois, from 1990 to 1994 and Carthage College in Kenosha, Wisconsin, from 1995 to 2012, compiling a career college football coaching record of 104–112–4.

== Early life an playing career ==
Rucks was born on December 21, 1960, in Waukegan, Illinois, and graduated from Waukegan West High School in 1979. Rucks played college football at Carthage College in Kenosha, Wisconsin, under head coach Art Keller. A first-team College Conference of Illinois and Wisconsin (CCIW), player in his senior year, Rucks graduated in 1983.

Rucks was drafted by the Denver Gold in the 14th round of the inaugural United States Football League Draft in 1983, right ahead of future Pro Football Hall of Fame quarterback Jim Kelly and punter Sean Landeta. However, he decided to forego the USFL, instead signing a free agent contract with the National Football League's New York Jets on May 5 of that year. Only three months later, Rucks was released by the Jets on August 12.

In 1984, Rucks played for the Racine Gladiators, being named to the all-league and all minor-league teams, and in 1985 for the Chicago Chargers. Inducted into the American Football Association Semi-Pro Hall of Fame in 2002, Rucks later served on the Gladiators' (now known as the Racine Raiders) Board of Directors.

== Coaching career ==
=== High school ===
Rucks was an assistant coach from 1986 to 1988 at Niles North High School in Skokie, Illinois.

=== North Park ===
Rucks was the head football coach at North Park University in Chicago. Having started as an assistant coach in 1989, Rucks was promoted to head coach in 1990, becoming the NCAA's youngest head football coach at 29. Ruck served as head coach for five seasons, until 1994, compiling a record of 9–33–3.

=== Carthage ===
After North Park, Rucks became the head football coach at his alma mater, Carthage. Before Rucks took over, the Red Men had not had a single winning season in their previous 13 years. Rucks quickly turned the team's fortunes around, accomplishing winning records in three of their first four seasons. In 2004, Rucks led the Red Men to their first Division III football playoff in 2004, advancing all the way to the quarterfinals. For that he was named the Coach of the Year for the CCIW and the Division III North Region. In 2009, Rucks was named Wisconsin Private College Football Coach of the Year. Rucks stepped down following the 2012 season. His coaching record at Carthage was 95–79–1.

== Later life and death ==
After retiring as the coach, Rucks remained with Carthage as an assistant athletic director and academic advisor. In 2014, Rucks was inducted into the Wisconsin Football Coaches Association Hall of Fame.

On March 10, 2015, Rucks was found unconscious in his car, which had been in a one-car accident in Kenosha. Emergency crews were unable to resuscitate him. His death was ruled a heart attack.

== Head coaching record ==
Year	Team	Overall	Conference	Standing	Bowl/playoffs	NCAA DIII^{#}
North Park Vikings (College Conference of Illinois and Wisconsin) (1990–1994)
1990	North Park	1–8	1–7	8th		
1991	North Park	0–9	0–8	9th		
1992	North Park	1–6–2	1–4–2	6th		
1993	North Park	4–4–1	2–4–1	5th		
1994	North Park	3–6	1–6	T–7th		
North Park:		9–33–3	5–29–3			
Carthage Red Men (College Conference of Illinois and Wisconsin) (1995–2012)
1995	Carthage	3–5–1	2–4–1	5th		
1996	Carthage	3–6	3–4	T–5th		
1997	Carthage	5–4	4–3	T–3rd		
1998	Carthage	5–4	4–3	5th		
1999	Carthage	5–4	4–3	T–4th		
2000	Carthage	4–6	1–6	T–6th		
2001	Carthage	6–4	3–4	5th		
2002	Carthage	4–6	3–4	5th		
2003	Carthage	3–7	1–6	7th		
2004	Carthage	11–2	6–1	T–1st	L NCAA Division III Quarterfinal	5
2005	Carthage	7–3	4–3	T–3rd		
2006	Carthage	6–4	3–4	T–4th		
2007	Carthage	7–3	4–3	4th		
2008	Carthage	5–5	3–4	T–5th		
2009	Carthage	7–3	4–3	T–3rd		
2010	Carthage	6–4	3–4	T–5th		
2011	Carthage	5–5	2–5	T–5th		
2012	Carthage	3–4	1–3			
Carthage:		95–79–1	55–67–1			
Total:		104–112–4				
National championship Conference title Conference division title or championship game berth
