= Charles E. Emery =

American football coach

Coaching career (HC unless noted)
- 1969: North Park

Head coaching record
- Overall: 2–7

Charles E. Emery was American football coach. He served as the head football coach at North Park College—now known as North Park University—in Chicago for one season, in 1969, compiling a record of 2–7.

== Head coaching record ==
| Year | Team | Overall | Conference | Standing | Bowl/playoffs |
|---|---|---|---|---|---|
North Park Vikings (College Conference of Illinois and Wisconsin) (1969)
| 1969 | North Park | 3–6 | 2–5 | 7th | |
| North Park: | | 2–7 | 2–5 | | |
| Total: | | 2–7 | | | |
