= Scott Pethtel =

American football coach

Current position
- Title: Head coach
- Team: Muncie Central HS (IN)

Coaching career (HC unless noted)
- 1979–1988: Adrian (assistant)
- 1989–2002: Ball State (assistant)
- 2003: Cincinnati (TE/ST/RC)
- 2004–2005: Buffalo (LB/ST)
- 2006–2012: North Park
- 2013–2014: Brookstone School (GA) (assistant)
- 2015–2016: Brookstone School (GA)
- 2017–present: Muncie Central HS (IN)

Head coaching record
- Overall: 10–60 (college)

Scott Pethtel is an American football coach. He served as the head football coach at North Park University in Chicago for seven seasons, from 2006 to 2012, compiling a record of 10–60. While at North Park, he grew the team from 30 players to around 90 players and increased average grade point average from 1.95 to 2.89.

Pethtel resigned his position at North Park on November 16, 2012. He then served as head football coach at Brookstone School, a private school in Columbus, Georgia. On May 23, 2017, Pethtel was hired as the head football coach of Muncie Central High School, in Muncie, Indiana.

== Head coaching record ==
=== College ===
| Year | Team | Overall | Conference | Standing | Bowl/playoffs |
|---|---|---|---|---|---|
North Park Vikings (College Conference of Illinois and Wisconsin) (2006–2012)
| 2006 | North Park | 1–9 | 0–7 | 8th | |
| 2007 | North Park | 1–9 | 0–7 | 8th | |
| 2008 | North Park | 1–9 | 0–7 | 8th | |
| 2009 | North Park | 1–9 | 0–7 | 8th | |
| 2010 | North Park | 2–8 | 0–7 | 8th | |
| 2011 | North Park | 3–7 | 0–7 | 8th | |
| 2012 | North Park | 1–9 | 0–7 | 8th | |
| North Park: | | 10–60 | 0–49 | | |
| Total: | | 10–60 | | | |
