= Kyle Rooker =

American football coach (born c. 1978)

Current position
- Title: Head coach
- Team: North Park
- Conference: CCIW
- Record: 17–43

Biographical details
- Born: c. 1978 (age 47–48); Uniontown, Pennsylvania, U.S.
- Education: College of Wooster (2001); Carthage College (2018)

Playing career
- 1997–2000: Wooster
- Position: Linebacker

Coaching career (HC unless noted)
- 2001–2010: Wooster (OC/OL)
- 2011: Wooster (DC/LB)
- 2012–2015: Carthage (OC/OL)
- 2016–2017: Carthage (OC/QB)
- 2018: Carthage (AHC)
- 2019–present: North Park

Head coaching record
- Overall: 17–43

Kyle Rooker (born c. 1978) is an American college football coach. He is the head football coach for North Park University, a position he has held since 2019. He also coached for Wooster and Carthage. He played college football for Wooster as a linebacker.

== Head coaching record ==
Year	Team	Overall	Conference	Standing	Bowl/playoffs
North Park Vikings (College Conference of Illinois and Wisconsin) (2019–present)
2019	North Park	1–9	1–8	T–8th	
2020–21	No team—COVID-19				
2021	North Park	2–8	2–7	9th	
2022	North Park	1–9	1–8	9th	
2023	North Park	5–5	4–5	T–5th	
2024	North Park	5–5	4–5	T–5th	
2025	North Park	3–7	2–7	T–8th	
2026	North Park	0–0	0–0		
North Park:		17–43	14–40		
Total:		17–43			
