= Bob Lord (American football) =

American football player and coach (born 1930)

Biographical details
- Born: February 3, 1930 (age 96); Brunswick, Maine, U.S.

Playing career
- 1950s: Northern Colorado
- Positions: Halfback, defensive back

Coaching career (HC unless noted)
- 1958–1959: Wesleyan (assistant)
- 1960: North Park (backfield)
- 1961–1963: North Park
- 1964–1965: Macalester
- 1966–1967: Wake Forest (DL)
- 1968–1969: Guilford
- 1970–1971: Appalachian State (assistant)
- 1972–1973: UMass (OL)
- 1974: Chicago Bears (ST/LB)
- 1975–1976: Green Bay Packers (ST)
- 1977: Green Bay Packers (OB)
- 1978: Green Bay Packers (OB/ST)
- 1979–1982: New York Giants (OB)
- 1984: Arizona Wranglers (ST)
- 1985–1987: Columbia HS (GA)
- 1988–1989: Berkmar HS (GA)
- 1990: Morehead State (assistant)
- 1991–1995: Alan C. Pope HS (GA)
- 1997: Rhein Fire (OL)
- 1998: Frankfurt Galaxy (OL)
- 1999: Berlin Thunder (OC/OL)
- 2000: Liberty (AHC/OL)
- 2004–2007: Fellowship Christian HS (GA)

Head coaching record
- Overall: 10–49 (college)

Robert C. Lord (born February 3, 1930) is an American former football coach. He was the head football coach at North Park College—now known as North Park University—from 1962 to 1963, Macalester College from 1964 to 1965, and Guilford College from 1968 to 1969, compiling a career college football record of ten wins and 49 losses. Lord also served as an assistant coach for nine seasons in the National Football League (NFL), working for the Chicago Bears, Green Bay Packers and New York Giants.

== Head coaching record ==
=== College ===
Year	Team	Overall	Conference	Standing	Bowl/playoffs
North Park Vikings (Independent) (1961)
1961	North Park	3–5			
North Park Vikings (College Conference of Illinois) (1962–1963)
1962	North Park	2–6	1–6	7th	
1963	North Park	1–7	0–6	7th	
North Park:		6–18	1–12		
Macalester Scots (Minnesota Intercollegiate Athletic Conference) (1964–1965)
1964	Macalester	0–8	0–7	8th	
1965	Macalester	0–8	0–7	8th	
Macalester:		0–16	0–14		
Guilford Quakers (Carolinas Conference) (1968–1969)
1968	Guilford	2–8	1–5	7th	
1969	Guilford	2–7	0–5	6th	
Guilford:		4–15	1–10		
Total:		10–49			
