= Mike Liljegren =

American football coach

Biographical details
- Education: North Park College (1985)

Coaching career (HC unless noted)
- 1989–1994: Illinois College (DC)
- 1995–2000: North Park
- 2003–2012: Collinsville HS (IL)

Head coaching record
- Overall: 9–46 (college); 19–72 (high school)

Mike Liljegren is an American football coach. He served as the head football coach at North Park University in Chicago for six seasons, from 1995 to 2000, compiling a record of 9–46.

== Head coaching record ==
=== College ===
Year	Team	Overall	Conference	Standing	Bowl/playoffs
North Park Vikings (College Conference of Illinois and Wisconsin) (1995–2000)
1995	North Park	2–7	1–6	8th	
1996	North Park	0–9	0–7	8th	
1997	North Park	0–9	0–7	8th	
1998	North Park	2–7	1–6	T–6th	
1999	North Park	2–7	1–6	T–7th	
2000	North Park	3–7	1–6	T–6th	
North Park:		9–46	4–38		
Total:		9–46			
