= Mel Boehland =

American football coach (1943–2021)

Biographical details
- Born: April 21, 1943; Bertha, Minnesota, U.S.
- Died: October 7, 2021 (aged 78)

Coaching career (HC unless noted)
- 1972–1988: Northwestern (MN)
- 1989: North Park

Head coaching record
- Overall: 78–64–1

Mel Boehland (April 21, 1943 — October 7, 2021) was an American football coach. He served as the head football coach at Northwestern College—now known as the University of Northwestern – St. Paul—in Roseville, Minnesota, from 1982 to 1988 and at North Park College—now known as North Park University—in 1989, compiling a career college football coaching record of 78–64–1.

Boehland died from complications of COVID-19 in October 2021, at the age of 78.

== Coaching career ==
=== Northwestern ===
Boehland was the head football coach at Northwestern College located in Roseville, Minnesota, serving for 15 seasons, from 1974 to 1988, compiling a record of 77–56–1.

=== North Park ===
After Northwestern, Boehland became the head football coach at coach for the North Park College in Chicago, Illinois. He held that position for the 1989 season, compiling a record of 1–8.
