= Norm Rathje =

American football player and coach (1936–2011)

Biographical details
- Born: April 27, 1936; Cedar Rapids, Iowa, US
- Died: December 9, 2011 (aged 75); Lincolnshire, Illinois, US

Playing career
- 1953–1956: Dubuque
- Position: Fullback

Coaching career (HC unless noted)
- 1967–1968: North Park

Head coaching record
- Overall: 9–9

Norman Lee Rathje (April 27, 1936 – December 9, 2011) was an American football player and coach. He served as the head football coach at North Park College—now known as North Park University—from 1967 to 1968.

== Playing career ==
Rathje played college football at the University of Dubuque as a fullback. He earned all-conference honors while with the program. While at Dubuque he also participated on the schools wrestling team and on the track & field squad in the shot put and discus throw. The University honored him by placing him in their "Athletic Hall of Fame" in 1989.

== Coaching career ==
Rathje was the head football coach at the North Park College—now known as North Park University—in Chicago. He held that position for the 1967 and 1968 seasons. His coaching record at North Park was 9–9.

While at North Park, he coached his team to a 100+ point game, defeating North Central College by a score of 104–32 on October 12, 1968.

== Death ==
Rathje died of cancer in 2011 at Lincolnshire, Illinois.

== Head coaching record ==
Year	Team	Overall	Conference	Standing	Bowl/playoffs
North Park Vikings (College Conference of Illinois and Wisconsin) (1967–1968)
1967	North Park	3–6	1–5	T–5th	
1968	North Park	6–3	5–2	T–2nd	
North Park:		9–9	6–7		
Total:		9–9			
