= Ed Bender =

American football player and coach (1930–2015)

Biographical details
- Born: June 15, 1930; Chicago, Illinois, U.S.
- Died: April 10, 2015 (aged 84)

Playing career
- 1949–1952: Northeast Missouri State
- Position: Quarterback

Coaching career (HC unless noted)
- 1956–1957: Princeton HS (MO)
- 1958–1959: Fulton HS (MO)
- 1960–1965: Rochelle HS (IL)
- 1966–1971: LaSalle-Peru HS (IL)
- 1972–1974: Wisconsin–Superior

Head coaching record
- Overall: 4–26 (college)

Edward William Bender (June 15, 1930 – April 10, 2015) was an American football player and coach. He served as the head football coach at the University of Wisconsin–Superior from 1972 to 1974, compiling a record of 4–26. He played college football at Northeast Missouri State College (now known as Truman State University) in Kirksville, Missouri.

== Head coaching record ==
=== College ===
Year	Team	Overall	Conference	Standing	Bowl/playoffs
Wisconsin–Superior Yellowjackets (Wisconsin State University Athletic Conference) (1972–1974)
1972	Wisconsin–Superior	1–9	1–7	9th	
1973	Wisconsin–Superior	2–8	2–6	8th	
1974	Wisconsin–Superior	1–9	1–7	T–8th	
Wisconsin–Superior:		4–26	4–20		
Total:		4–26			
