= Rathjen =

Rathjen, variant Rathjens, is a surname. Notable people with the surname include:

- Carl August Rathjens (1887–1966), German geographer
- Deborah Rathjen, Australian scientist
- Peter Rathjen (born 1964), Australian scientist and medical researcher
- Uwe Rathjen (born 1943), West German handball player
- Tobias Rathjen, German murderer; responsible for the Hanau shootings
