= William D. Gourley =

American football coach and sportscaster

Biographical details
- Born: August 17, 1937
- Died: September 2, 2014 (aged 77)
- Education: Miami University

Coaching career (HC unless noted)
- 1970–1972: North Park

Head coaching record
- Overall: 8–17–2

William D. Gourley (August 17, 1937 – September 2, 2014) was an American football coach and sportscaster. He served as the head football coach at North Park College—now known as North Park University—in Chicago for three seasons, from 1970 to 1972, compiling a record of 8–17–2.

Gourley began his coaching career at Loyola Academy in Wilmette, Illinois.

== Head coaching record ==
Year	Team	Overall	Conference	Standing	Bowl/playoffs
North Park Vikings (College Conference of Illinois and Wisconsin) (1970–1972)
1970	North Park	2–6–1	2–5–1	7th	
1971	North Park	4–5	4–4	T–5th	
1972	North Park	2–6–1	2–5–1	7th	
North Park:		8–17–2	8–14–2		
Total:		8–17–2			
