= Gene Mitz =

American football coach (born 1943)

Biographical details
- Born: c. 1943 (age 82–83)
- Education: Drake University

Playing career
- 1961–1964: Drake
- Position: Guard

Coaching career (HC unless noted)
- 1967–1968: Proviso West HS (IL) (freshman)
- 1969–1971: Proviso East HS (IL) (DC)
- 1972: Triton
- 1973–1974: Drake (OL)
- 1975–1977: North Park
- 1978–1980: Northwestern (OL)
- 1981–1982: Dundee HS (IL)
- 1983–1984: Ball State (OL)
- 1985–1986: Southwest Missouri State (OL)
- 1987–1989: Rose–Hulman (OC)
- 1990–1992: Triton
- 1993–1997: Wawasee HS (IN)

Administrative career (AD unless noted)
- 1987–1989: Rose–Hulman

Head coaching record
- Overall: 2–25 (college); 17–18 (junior college); 21–46 (high school)

Accomplishments and honors

Championships
- 1 N4C (1972)

Eugene Mitz (born c. 1943) is a former American college football coach. He served as the head football coach at North Park College—now known as North Park University—in Chicago for three seasons from 1975 to 1977, Triton Junior College—now known as Triton College—in 1972 and from 1990 to 1992, Dundee High School—now known as Dundee-Crown High School—from 1981 to 1982, and Wawasee High School from 1993 until his retirement in 1997. He also coached for Proviso East High School, Drake, Northwestern, Ball State, Southwest Missouri State—now known as Missouri State, and Rose–Hulman.

From 1987 to 1989, Mitz served as the athletic director for Rose–Hulman Institute of Technology.

== Head coaching record ==
=== College ===
Year	Team	Overall	Conference	Standing	Bowl/playoffs
North Park Vikings (College Conference of Illinois and Wisconsin) (1975–1977)
1975	North Park	1–8	1–7	T–8th	
1976	North Park	1–8	0–8	9th	
1977	North Park	0–9	0–8	9th	
North Park:		2–25	1–23		
Total:		2–25			

=== Junior college ===
Year	Team	Overall	Conference	Standing	Bowl/playoffs
Triton Warriors (North Central Community College Conference) (1972)
1972	Triton	8–2		1st	
Triton Trojans (North Central Community College Conference) (1990–1992)
1990	Triton	1–6	1–5	8th	
1991	Triton	2–6			
1992	Triton	6–4			
Triton:		17–18			
Total:		17–18			
National championship Conference title Conference division title or championship game berth

=== High school ===
Year	Team	Overall	Conference	Standing	Bowl/playoffs
Dundee Cardinals () (1981–1982)
1981	Dundee	4–5			
1982	Dundee	2–7			
Dundee:		6–12			
Wawasee Warriors (Northern Lakes Conference) (1993–1997)
1993	Wawasee	2–8			
1994	Wawasee	4–6			
1995	Wawasee	1–8	1–5		
1996	Wawasee	4–6	2–4		
1997	Wawasee	4–6	2–4		
Wawasee:		15–34			
Total:		21–46			
