= Harold Swanson =

American football coach and college athletics administrator

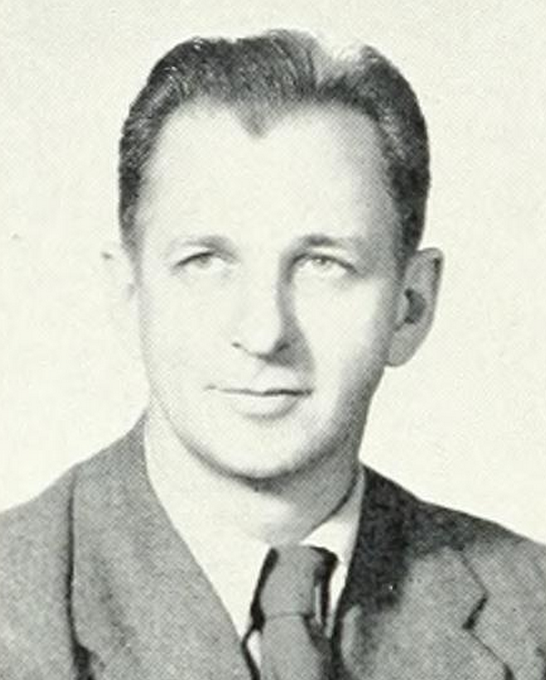
- Swanson pictured in the Cupola 1953, North Park yearbook

Biographical details
- Born: c. 1913
- Education: University of Wyoming (1939)

Coaching career (HC unless noted)
- 1946: Manchester (assistant)
- 1947–1948: Manchester
- 1958–1960: North Park

Administrative career (AD unless noted)
- ?–1962: North Park
- c. 1965–1970: Rock Valley College

Head coaching record
- Overall: 20–13–3

Harold Swanson (c. 1913 – ?) was an American football coach and college athletics administrator. He served as the head football coach at Manchester College—now known as Manchester University—in North Manchester, Indiana from 1947 to 1948 and at North Park College—now known as North Park University—in Chicago, Illinois from 1958 to 1960. His record at North Park was 17–7–1.

== Head coaching record ==
Year	Team	Overall	Conference	Standing	Bowl/playoffs
Manchester Spartans (Hoosier Conference) (1947–1948)
1947	Manchester	2–5–1	2–3–1	T–4th	
1948	Manchester	1–6–1	1–3–1	T–5th	
Manchester:		3–11–2	6–6–2		
North Park Vikings (Independent) (1958–1960)
1958	North Park	7–1			
1959	North Park	6–1–1			
1960	North Park	4–5			
North Park:		17–7–1			
Total:		20–13–3			
