= Erik Liljegren =

- Occupation: Correspondent for Fox News Channel

Erik Liljegren is a former correspondent for Fox News Channel and founder of Eye Care Video. He joined the network in January 2005 as a reporter for The FOX Report with Shepard Smith.

== Early life and education ==
Liljegren holds a degree in English and Political Science from the University of Vermont.

Before taking his position at the Fox News Channel (FNC), Liljegren served as a general assignment reporter at the Fox affiliate station, WGHP-TV, in High Point, North Carolina from 2003–2005. He began his journalism career in 1990 as a sports reporter for the Nantucket Beacon, a weekly newspaper in Massachusetts.

== Fox News Channel ==
Liljegren first arrived at FNC three months prior to its launch in 1996. Over the next six years, he worked as a producer for major event coverage and breaking news including the trial of Oklahoma City bomber Timothy McVeigh, the Columbine High School shootings, the 2000 presidential election recount, and coverage from Ground Zero in the aftermath of the 9/11 attacks.

== Eye Care Video ==
Liljegren started Eye Care Video in 2007, after "recogniz[ing] that internet based video advertising was a game changer in that it would allow small businesses to reach potential customers with TV quality video.
