= Kirstin Liljegren =

Danish fashion model (born 1996)

- Born: Kirstin Kragh Liljegren; 1 October 1996 (age 30); Copenhagen, Denmark
- Occupation: Model
- Modeling information
- Height: 1.79 m (5 ft 10 1/2 in)
- Hair color: Blonde
- Eye color: Blue-green
- Agency: Women Management (New York City, Paris, Milan); Premier Model Management (London); View Management (Barcelona); Modelwerk (Hamburg); MIKAs (Stockholm); Scoop Models (Copenhagen) (mother agency)

Kirstin Kragh Liljegren is a Danish fashion model.

== Early life ==
Liljegren grew up in Vedbæk and Middelfart with her brothers.

== Career ==
Liljegren sent photos to Danish modeling agency Scoop Models and signed with them to start her career. She opened Balenciaga's S/S 2013 show at age 15. That year, she also walked for brands like Prada, Jil Sander, Valentino, and Louis Vuitton, and appeared in Zara and Missoni advertisements. Elle Macpherson chose Liljegren to model her lingerie collection called Elle Macpherson Body.

Liljegren has modeled for Elle McPherson's swimwear line, Tommy Hilfiger, Balmain, Marc Jacobs, Polo Ralph Lauren, DKNY, Oscar de la Renta, Topshop, Versace, Maison Margiela, and Rag & Bone.

She was once ranked as a "Top 50 Model" by models.com.
