= College Conference of Illinois and Wisconsin =

Athletic conference in NCAA Division III

- Formerly: College Conference of Illinois (1946–1967)
- Association: NCAA
- Founded: 1946
- Commissioner: Lexie Vernon (since 2026)
- Sports fielded: 26; men's: 13; women's: 13
- Division: Division III
- No. of teams: 9 (10 in 2027)
- Headquarters: Naperville, Illinois
- Region: Upper Midwest
- Website: cciw.org

Locations
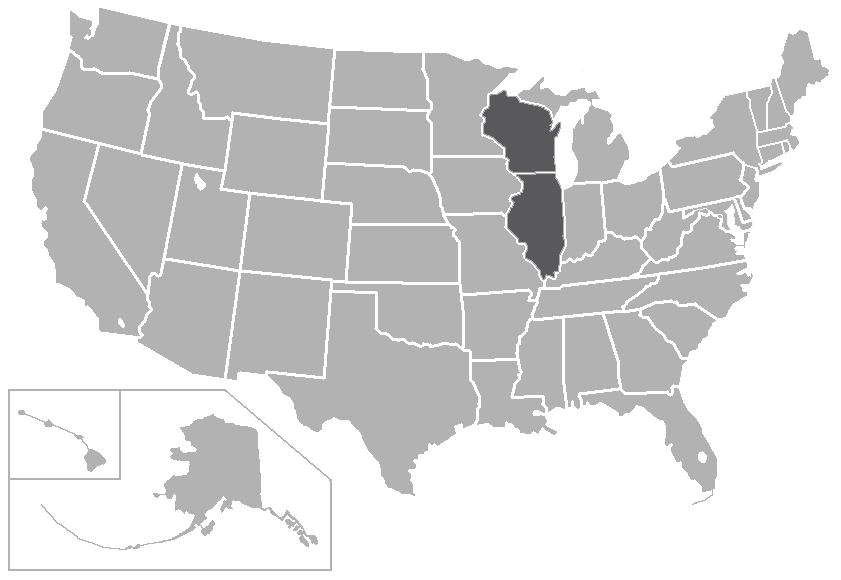

The College Conference of Illinois and Wisconsin (CCIW) is an intercollegiate athletic conference which competes in the National Collegiate Athletic Association (NCAA) Division III.

CCIW schools have accounted for 52 national championships in NCAA Division III competition, including 15 in men's cross country; six in men's basketball; six in men's outdoor track and field; seven in football; four in men's indoor track and field; three in women's soccer; two in women's outdoor track and field, women's basketball, men's soccer, men’s golf, and men's volleyball; and one apiece in baseball and women's indoor track and field.

Elmhurst College won a pair of Division III women's volleyball championships (1983 and 1985), and North Central College won a women's basketball title (1983) before the conference began sponsorship of women's athletics in 1986–87.

North Central men's cross country won its 13th national title in program history during the fall of 2009, while the North Central men's indoor track and field team captured the 2010 national championship. The Cardinals made their clean sweep by winning the men's outdoor track and field title in the spring of 2010. In addition, the Illinois Wesleyan women's outdoor track and field team, as well as the baseball team, took home national titles, giving the CCIW five national championships during the 2009–10 season.

North Central defended its titles in men's indoor track and field and outdoor track and field in the spring of 2011 while the Cardinals won their second men's cross country title in three seasons in the fall of 2011 and their third-straight indoor track and field title in 2012. Illinois Wesleyan won the conference's second women's basketball national title in 2012.

In 2019 Illinois Wesleyan Men’s Golf won their first national championship. They followed that up with a second national championship in 2021 after a one year break due to the COVID-19 pandemic in 2020. Coached by Jim Ott to both Championships and led by Drew Pershing and Ben Johnson in 2019 and Jimmy Morton, Andrew Abel and Rob Wuethrich in 2021.

North Central Football won the 2019 National Championship and, after the COVID year of 2020 in which no championship was held, finished second in the nation in 2021.

Carthage won consecutive men's volleyball titles in 2021 and 2022.

== History ==
College Conference of Illinois and Wisconsin
Location of CCIW members: full, future

The conference was formed with nine charter members (Augustana College, Carthage College, Elmhurst College, Illinois College, Illinois Wesleyan University, Lake Forest College, Millikin University, North Central College and Wheaton College) on April 26, 1946, in Jacksonville, Illinois, and opened competition in the 1946–47 academic year as the College Conference of Illinois. In 1967, the name was changed to the College Conference of Illinois and Wisconsin to recognize Carthage, which moved to Kenosha, Wisconsin in 1962, and Carroll University, which entered the conference in 1955.

The CCIW sponsors 26 sports: baseball, men's and women's basketball, women's bowling, men's and women's cross country, football, men's and women's golf, men's and women's lacrosse, men's and women's soccer, softball, men's and women's swimming, men's and women's tennis, men's and women's indoor track and field, men's and women's outdoor track and field, men's and women's volleyball, and men's and women's wrestling. The most recently added sports are men's volleyball, which started play in the 2020 season (2019–20 school year); bowling, which started play in 2020–21; and women's wrestling, added for the 2022–23 season.

CCIW membership has experienced several changes since its inception. After Carthage left in 1952, Illinois College withdrew the following year (1953). Elmhurst and Wheaton withdrew following the 1959–60 academic year. Wheaton re-joined for all sports but football in 1967 (and for football in 1970). Elmhurst re-joined in the fall of 1967 for all sports but football (and for football in 1968). Carroll joined during the 1955 spring sports season (1954-55 academic season). Carthage returned in the fall of 1961, and North Park University entered the following fall (1962). Lake Forest dropped out at the end of the 1962–63 academic year. The last member to leave the CCIW was Carroll following the 1991–92 academic year. Carroll returned to the CCIW in 2016. In 2007, Rose–Hulman Institute of Technology, located in Terre Haute, Indiana, joined the CCIW as an associate member for men's and women's swimming. After 2017, Rose–Hulman left as an associate member shortly before its full-time home of the Heartland Collegiate Athletic Conference (HCAC) announced it would add swimming.

The CCIW lost one affiliate member and gained two in 2020. Greenville University, which had moved its men's volleyball program from the single-sport Midwest Collegiate Volleyball League to the CCIW in 2019–20, downgraded the sport from varsity to club status after that school year. With the addition of bowling, Lakeland University, a men's wrestling affiliate since 2016–17, added bowling to its CCIW membership, while Aurora University and Marian University became affiliates in that sport. In 2022–23, Aurora and Lakeland added men's and women's wrestling to their CCIW memberships, and Aurora also joined for men's wrestling.

On September 4, 2024, according to a report from the Division III web outlet D3sports.com that the CCIW would expel Washington University in St. Louis from football membership after the 2025 season, with the report soon confirmed by the conference office.

=== Chronological timeline ===
- 1946 – On April 26, 1946, the CCIW was founded as the College Conference of Illinois (CCI). Charter members included Augustana College of Illinois, Carthage College, Elmhurst College, Illinois College, Illinois Wesleyan College (now Illinois Wesleyan University), Lake Forest University (now Lake Forest College), Millikin College (now Millikin University), North Central College and Wheaton College, beginning the 1946–47 academic year.
- 1952 – Carthage left the CCI after the 1951–52 academic year.
- 1953 – Illinois College left the CCI after the 1952–53 academic year.
- 1955 – Carroll College of Wisconsin (now Carroll University) joined the CCI in the 1955–56 academic year.
- 1960 – Elmhurst and Wheaton left the CCI after the 1959–60 academic year.
- 1961 – Carthage rejoined the CCI in the 1961–62 academic year.
- 1962 – North Park College (now North Park University) joined the CCI in the 1962–63 academic year.
- 1963 – Lake Forest left the CCI after the 1962–63 academic year.
- 1967:
  - The CCI was rebranded as the College Conference of Illinois and Wisconsin (CCIW) in the 1967–68 academic year.
  - Elmhurst and Wheaton rejoined the CCIW in the 1967–68 academic year. Elmhurst later rejoined for football for the 1968 fall season (1968–69 school year) while Wheaton did the same for the 1970 fall season (1970–71 school year).
- 1992 – Carroll (Wisc.) left the CCIW to join the Midwest Conference (MWC) after the 1991–92 academic year.
- 2007 – Rose–Hulman Institute of Technology joined the CCIW as an affiliate member for men's and women's swimming in the 2007–08 academic year.
- 2014 – The University of Dubuque joined the CCIW as an affiliate member for men's and women's lacrosse in the 2015 spring season (2014–15 academic year).
- 2016:
  - Carroll (Wisc.) rejoined the CCIW in the 2016–17 academic year.
  - Concordia University of Wisconsin, Lakeland University and the Milwaukee School of Engineering (MSoE) joined the CCIW as affiliate members for men's wrestling in the 2016–17 academic year.
- 2017 – Rose–Hulman left the CCIW as an affiliate member for men's and women's swimming after the 2016–17 academic year.
- 2018 – Two institutions joined the CCIW as affiliate members, both effective in the 2018–19 academic year:
  - The University of Chicago for women's lacrosse
  - and Washington University in St. Louis for football
- 2019:
  - Greenville University and Loras College joined the CCIW as affiliate members for men's volleyball in the 2020 spring season (2019–20 academic year).
  - Dubuque left the CCIW as an affiliate member for women's lacrosse after the 2019 spring season (2018–19 academic year); as the school announced that it would drop the sport.
- 2020:
  - Greenville left the CCIW as an affiliate member for men's volleyball after the 2020 spring season (2019–20 academic year); as the school announced that it would drop the sport.
  - Aurora University and Marian University of Wisconsin joined the CCIW as affiliate members for women's bowling (with Lakeland doing the same) in the 2021 spring season (2020–21 academic year).
- 2021:
  - Dubuque left the CCIW as an affiliate member for men's lacrosse to join the Midwest Lacrosse Conference (MLC) after the 2021 spring season (2020–21 academic year).
  - Transylvania University joined the CCIW as an affiliate member for men's lacrosse in the 2022 spring season (2021–22 academic year).
- 2022 – Aurora added both men's and women's wrestling to its CCIW affiliate membership (with Lakeland doing the same for women's wrestling) in the 2022–23 academic year.
- 2023 – Transylvania left the CCIW as an affiliate member for men's lacrosse after the 2023 spring season (2022–23 academic year).
- 2024:
  - Two institutions left the CCIW as affiliate members, both effective after the 2023–24 academic year:
    - Chicago for women's lacrosse
    - and Lakeland for women's bowling, and men's and women's wrestling
  - MSoE added women's wrestling to its CCIW affiliate membership in the 2024–25 academic year.
- 2026 – Washington (Mo.) was expelled from CCIW football membership after the 2025 fall season (2025–26 academic year).
- 2027 – Concordia–Wisconsin, already a CCIW associate for men's wrestling, will join as a full CCIW member, effective in the 2027–28 academic year.

== Member schools ==
Throughout its history, all CCIW members, whether full or affiliate, have been private schools.

=== Current members ===
The CCIW currently has nine full members.

Institution	Location	Founded	Affiliation	Enrollment	Nickname	Colors	Joined (Note: Represents the calendar year when fall sports competition begins.)
Augustana College	Rock Island, Illinois	1860	Lutheran ELCA	2,349	Vikings		1946
Carroll University	Waukesha, Wisconsin	1846	Presbyterian	3,283	Pioneers		1955 (Note: Carroll joined the CCIW during the 1955 spring season (1954–55 school year).); 2016 (Note: Carroll left the CCIW after the 1991–92 school year before rejoining as an affiliate member for men's and women's lacrosse for the 2015 and 2016 spring seasons (2014–15 to 2015–16 school years), and eventually as a full member again since the 2016–17 school year.)
Carthage College	Kenosha, Wisconsin	1847	Lutheran ELCA	2,667	Firebirds		1946; 1961 (Note: Carthage left the CCIW after the 1951–52 school year before rejoining in the 1961–62 school year.)
Elmhurst University	Elmhurst, Illinois	1871	United Church of Christ	2,748	Bluejays		1946; 1967 (Note: Elmhurst left the CCIW after the 1959–60 school year, but rejoined in 1967–68 for most sports, with football returning in 1968–69.)
Illinois Wesleyan University	Bloomington, Illinois	1850	Methodist	1,527	Titans		1946
Millikin University	Decatur, Illinois	1901	Presbyterian	1,807	Big Blue		1946
North Central College	Naperville, Illinois	1861	United Methodist	2,490	Cardinals		1946
North Park University	Chicago, Illinois	1891	Evangelical Covenant	2,660	Vikings		1962
Wheaton College	Wheaton, Illinois	1860	Evangelical Protestant	2,885	Thunder		1946; 1967 (Note: Wheaton left the CCIW after the 1959–60 school year, but returned for most sports in 1967–68 and football in 1970–71.)

=== Future members ===
The CCIW will have one new full member.

Institution	Location	Founded	Affiliation	Enrollment	Nickname	Colors	Joining (Note: Represents the calendar year when fall sports competition begins.)	Current conference
Concordia University Wisconsin	Mequon, Wisconsin	1880	Lutheran LCMS	2,473	Falcons		2027 (Note: Concordia–Wisconsin has been a CCIW affiliate for men's wrestling since the 2016–17 academic year.)	Northern (NACC)

=== Affiliate members ===
The CCIW currently has five affiliate members.

Institution	Location	Founded	Affiliation	Enrollment	Nickname	Joined (Note: Represents the calendar year when fall sports competition begins.)	CCIW sport(s)	Primary conference
Aurora University	Aurora, Illinois	1893	Nonsectarian	2,309	Spartans	2020^{w.bowl.}	Women's bowling	Northern (NACC)
Aurora University	Aurora, Illinois	1893	Nonsectarian	2,309	Spartans	2022^{m.wr.}	Men's wrestling	Northern (NACC)
Aurora University	Aurora, Illinois	1893	Nonsectarian	2,309	Spartans	2022^{w.wr.}	Women's wrestling	Northern (NACC)
Concordia University Wisconsin	Mequon, Wisconsin	1881	Lutheran LCMS	7,721	Falcons	2016	Men's wrestling	Northern (NACC)
Loras College	Dubuque, Iowa	1839	Catholic (Archdiocese of Dubuque)	1,600	Duhawks	2019	Men's volleyball	American Rivers (A-R-C)
Marian University	Fond du Lac, Wisconsin	1936	Catholic (C.S.S.A.)	1,497	Sabres	2020	Women's bowling	Northern (NACC)
Milwaukee School of Engineering	Milwaukee, Wisconsin	1903	Nonsectarian	2,823	Raiders	2016^{m.wr.}	Men's wrestling	Northern (NACC)
Milwaukee School of Engineering	Milwaukee, Wisconsin	1903	Nonsectarian	2,823	Raiders	2024^{w.wr.}	Women's wrestling	Northern (NACC)

=== Former members ===
The CCIW has two former full members.

Institution	Location	Founded	Affiliation	Enrollment	Nickname	Joined (Note: Represents the calendar year when fall sports competition begins.)	Left (Note: Represents the calendar year when spring sports competition ends.)	Current conference
Illinois College	Jacksonville, Illinois	1829	United Church of Christ; & Presbyterian	973	Blueboys	1946	1953	Midwest (MWC)
Lake Forest College	Lake Forest, Illinois	1857	Nonsectarian	1,441	Foresters	1946	1963	Midwest (MWC)

=== Former affiliate members ===
The CCIW has seven former affiliate members.

Institution	Location	Founded	Affiliation	Enrollment	Nickname	Joined (Note: Represents the calendar year when fall sports competition begins.)	Left (Note: Represents the calendar year when spring sports competition ends.)	CCIW sport(s)	Primary conference
Greenville University	Greenville, Illinois	1892	Free Methodist	932	Panthers	2019	2020	Men's volleyball	St. Louis (SLIAC) (Note: After competing in the CCIW as an affiliate member, while Greenville's men's volleyball team later joined in its primary home conference in the St. Louis Intercollegiate Athletic Conference (SLIAC), which they still compete today for all of its other sports, it however dropped the sport after the 2020 spring season (2019–20 school year). Greenville reinstated men's volleyball starting in the 2025 season, but has yet to join any conference for that sport.)
Lakeland University	Herman, Wisconsin	1862	United Church of Christ	3,973	Muskies	2016^{m.wr.}	2024^{m.wr.}	Men's wrestling	Northern (NACC)
Lakeland University	Herman, Wisconsin	1862	United Church of Christ	3,973	Muskies	2020^{w.bowl.}	2024^{w.bowl.}	Women's bowling	Northern (NACC)
Lakeland University	Herman, Wisconsin	1862	United Church of Christ	3,973	Muskies	2022^{w.wr.}	2024^{w.wr.}	Women's wrestling	Northern (NACC)
Rose–Hulman Institute of Technology (RHIT)	Terre Haute, Indiana	1874	Nonsectarian	1,840	Fightin'; Engineers	2007^{m.sw.}	2017^{m.sw.}	Men's swimming	Heartland (HCAC)
Rose–Hulman Institute of Technology (RHIT)	Terre Haute, Indiana	1874	Nonsectarian	1,840	Fightin'; Engineers	2007^{w.sw.}	2017^{w.sw.}	Women's swimming	Heartland (HCAC)
Transylvania University	Lexington, Kentucky	1780	Disciples of Christ	963	Pioneers	2021	2023	Men's lacrosse	Heartland (HCAC)
University of Chicago	Chicago, Illinois	1890	Nonsectarian	15,276	Maroons	2018	2024	Women's lacrosse	University (UAA)
University of Dubuque	Dubuque, Iowa	1852	Presbyterian	2,190	Spartans	2014^{m.lax.}	2021^{m.lax.}	Men's lacrosse	American Rivers (A-R-C) (Note: After competing in the CCIW as an affiliate member, Dubuque's men's lacrosse team joined the Midwest Lacrosse Conference (MLC) as of the 2022 spring season (2021–22 school year). While it's women's lacrosse team later joined in its primary home conference in the American Rivers Conference (A-R-C), which they still compete today for all of its other sports, it however dropped the sport after the 2019 spring season (2018–19 school year).)
University of Dubuque	Dubuque, Iowa	1852	Presbyterian	2,190	Spartans	2014^{w.lax.}	2019^{w.lax.}	Women's lacrosse	American Rivers (A-R-C)
Washington University in St. Louis	St. Louis, Missouri	1853	Nonsectarian	14,117	Bears	2018	2026	Football	University (UAA)

=== Membership timeline ===
Full member (all sports) Full member (non-football) Associate member (football) Associate member (sport)

== Sports ==
In 2015, men's and women's lacrosse were added as sanctioned sports by the CCIW. The CCIW announced the inclusion of men's volleyball for the 2020 season (2019–20 school year), with bowling (an NCAA sport for women only) added in 2020–21. Women's wrestling became the newest conference sport in 2022–23.

The CCIW sponsors championships in the following sports:

Conference sports
Sport	Men's	Women's
Baseball	✓	
Basketball	✓	✓
Bowling		✓
Cross country	✓	✓
Football	✓	
Golf	✓	✓
Lacrosse	✓	✓
Soccer	✓	✓
Softball		✓
Swimming	✓	✓
Tennis	✓	✓
Track and field (indoor)	✓	✓
Track and field (outdoor)	✓	✓
Volleyball	✓	✓
Wrestling	✓	✓

=== Men's sponsored sports by school ===
School	Baseball	Basketball	Cross country	Football	Golf	Lacrosse	Soccer	Swimming & diving	Tennis	Track & field (indoor)	Track & field (outdoor)	Volleyball	Wrestling	Total CCIW sports
Augustana (IL)	✓	✓	✓	✓	✓	✓	✓	✓	✓	✓	✓	✓	✓	13
Carroll	✓	✓	✓	✓	✓	✓	✓	✓	✓	✓	✓	✗	✗	11
Carthage	✓	✓	✓	✓	✓	✓	✓	✓	✓	✓	✓	✓	✓	13
Elmhurst	✓	✓	✓	✓	✓	✓	✓	✗	✓	✓	✓	✗	✓	11
Illinois Wesleyan	✓	✓	✓	✓	✓	✓	✓	✓	✓	✓	✓	✓	✓	13
Millikin	✓	✓	✓	✓	✓	✗	✓	✓	✓	✓	✓	✗	✓	11
North Central	✓	✓	✓	✓	✓	✓	✓	✓	✓	✓	✓	✓	✓	13
North Park	✓	✓	✓	✓	✓	✓	✓	✗	✗	✓	✓	✓	✗	10
Wheaton (IL)	✓	✓	✓	✓	✓	✗	✓	✓	✓	✓	✓	✗	✓	11
Totals	9	9	9	9	9	7+1	9	7	8	9	9	5+1	7+4	106+7
Aurora													✓	1
Concordia (WI)													✓	1
Lakeland													✓	1
Loras												✓		1
MSOE													✓	1
Transylvania						✓								1

==== Men's varsity sports not sponsored by the CCIW that are played by CCIW schools ====
School	Water Polo (Note: De facto Division I sport. The NCAA men's water polo championship is open to all NCAA members.)
Augustana (IL)	MPSF

=== Women's sponsored sports by school ===
School	Basketball	Bowling (Note: De facto Division I sport. The NCAA bowling championship is currently open to members of all NCAA divisions. With a separate D-II championship to be established in 2027–28, the future status of D-III within the championship structure has yet to be determined.)	Cross country	Golf	Lacrosse	Soccer	Softball	Swimming & diving	Tennis	Track & field (indoor)	Track & field (outdoor)	Volleyball	Wrestling (Note: De facto Division I sport through 2026–27. The NCAA women's wrestling championship is currently open to members of all NCAA divisions, but a separate D-III championship will be established in 2027–28.)	Total CCIW sports
Augustana (IL)	✓	✓	✓	✓	✓	✓	✓	✓	✓	✓	✓	✓	✓	13
Carroll	✓	✓	✓	✓	✓	✓	✓	✓	✓	✓	✓	✓	✗	12
Carthage	✓	✓	✓	✓	✓	✓	✓	✓	✓	✓	✓	✓	✓	13
Elmhurst	✓	✓	✓	✓	✓	✓	✓	✗	✓	✓	✓	✓	✓	12
Illinois Wesleyan	✓	✓	✓	✓	✓	✓	✓	✓	✓	✓	✓	✓	✓	13
Millikin	✓	✗	✓	✓	✗	✓	✓	✓	✓	✓	✓	✓	✗ (Note: Millikin will add women's wrestling in 2026–27.)	10
North Central	✓	✓	✓	✓	✓	✓	✓	✓	✓	✓	✓	✓	✓	13
North Park	✓	✗	✓	✓	✗	✓	✓	✗	✓	✓	✓	✓	✗	9
Wheaton (IL)	✓	✗	✓	✓	✗	✓	✓	✓	✓	✓	✓	✓	✗	10
Totals	9	6 + 3	9	9	6 + 1	9	9	7	9	9	9	9	5 + 3	105 + 6
Aurora		✓											✓	2
Lakeland		✓											✓	2
Marian (WI)		✓												1
MSOE													✓	1
Chicago					✓									1

==== Women's varsity sports not sponsored by the CCIW that are played by CCIW schools ====
School	Flag football (Note: Part of the NCAA Emerging Sports for Women program.)	Triathlon	Water polo (Note: De facto Division I sport. The NCAA women's water polo championship is open to members of all NCAA divisions.)
Augustana (IL)			CWPA
Carthage			CWPA
Illinois Wesleyan	IND		
Millikin	(Note: Millikin will add flag football in 2026–27.)	IND	
North Central		IND	
North Park	IND		

== National championships ==
Year	Sport	School
2024	Football	North Central
2022	Football	North Central
2022	Men's volleyball	Carthage
2021	Men's golf	Illinois Wesleyan
2021	Men's volleyball	Carthage
2019	Football	North Central
2019	Men's golf	Illinois Wesleyan
2018	Men's cross country	North Central
2017	Men's cross country	North Central
2016	Men's cross country	North Central
2014	Men's cross country	North Central
2012	Men's cross country	North Central
2012	Women's basketball	Illinois Wesleyan
2011	Men's cross country	North Central
2010	Baseball	Illinois Wesleyan
2010	Men's outdoor track and field	North Central
2010	Men's indoor track and field	North Central
2009	Men's cross country	North Central
2008	Women's indoor track and field	Illinois Wesleyan
2008	Women's outdoor track and field	Illinois Wesleyan
2007	Women's soccer	Wheaton
2006	Women's soccer	Wheaton
2005	Women's basketball	Millikin
2004	Women's soccer	Wheaton
2000	Men's outdoor track and field	North Central
1999	Men's cross country	North Central
1998	Men's cross country	North Central
1998	Men's outdoor track and field	North Central
1997	Men's basketball	Illinois Wesleyan
1997	Men's cross country	North Central
1997	Men's soccer	Wheaton
1994	Men's outdoor track and field	North Central
1993	Men's cross country	North Central
1992	Men's cross country	North Central
1989	Men's outdoor track and field	North Central
1989	Men's indoor track and field	North Central
1987	Men's basketball	North Park
1987	Men's cross country	North Central
1986	Football	Augustana
1985	Football	Augustana
1985	Men's basketball	North Park
1985	Women's volleyball	Elmhurst
1984	Football	Augustana
1984	Men's soccer	Wheaton
1983	Football	Augustana
1983	Women's basketball	North Central
1983	Women's volleyball	Elmhurst
1982	Men's cross country	North Central
1981	Men's cross country	North Central
1980	Men's basketball	North Park
1979	Men's basketball	North Park
1979	Men's cross country	North Central
1978	Men's basketball	North Park
1978	Men's cross country	North Central
1976	Men's cross country	North Central
1975	Men's cross country	North Central
