= List of Carthage Firebirds head football coaches =

The Carthage Firebirds football program, previously known as Redmen and more recently as Red Men, with the change to "Firebirds" occurring on February 19, 2021, is a college football team that represents Carthage College in the College Conference of Illinois and Wisconsin, a part of NCAA Division III. The team has had 22 head coaches since its first recorded football game in 1895. The current coach is Matt Popino, who first took the position for the 2024 season.

== Key ==
Key to symbols in coaches list
General		Overall		Conference		Postseason (Note: Although the first Rose Bowl Game was played in 1902, it has been continuously played since the 1916 game, and is recognized as the oldest bowl game by the NCAA. "—" indicates any season prior to 1916 when postseason games were not played.)	
No.	Order of coaches (Note: A running total of the number of head coaches, with coaches who served separate tenures being counted only once. Interim head coaches are represented with "Int" and are not counted in the running total. "—" indicates the team played but either without a coach or no coach is on record. "X" indicates an interim year without play.)	GC	Games coached	CW	Conference wins	PW	Postseason wins
DC	Division championships	OW	Overall wins	CL	Conference losses	PL	Postseason losses
CC	Conference championships	OL	Overall losses	CT	Conference ties	PT	Postseason ties
NC	National championships	OT	Overall ties (Note: Overtime rules in college football were introduced in 1996, making ties impossible in the period since.)	C%	Conference winning percentage		
†	Elected to the College Football Hall of Fame	O%	Overall winning percentage (Note: When computing the win–loss percentage, a tie counts as half a win and half a loss.)				

== Coaches ==
Statistics correct as of the end of the 2025 college football season.

No.	Name	Term	GC	OW	OL	OT	O%	CW	CL	CT	C%	PW	PL	CCs	NCs	Awards
1	Ralph Harper McKee	1895–1900	26	19	6	1	.750	—	—	—		—	—	—	—	
2	Ben Mathis	1901	2	1	1	0	.500	—	—	—		—	—	—	—	
3	Wilber Larrick	1902–1904	8	3	2	3	.563	—	—	—		—	—	—	—	
4	Bud Hendrickson	1905	6	4	2	0	.667	—	—	—		—	—	—	—	
5	Carl Sundberg	1906	5	3	2	0	.600	—	—	—		—	—	—	—	
6	Russell Osborne	1907	7	2	5	0	.286	—	—	—		—	—	—	—	
7	J. Arthur Baird	1908–1914	46	24	19	3	.554	4	5	0	.444	—	—	—	—	
8	Stewart Clark	1915–1919	15	8	7	0	.533	—	—	—		—	—	—	—	
9	Forest Loudin	1916–1920	23	8	13	2	.391	—	—	—		—	—	—	—	
10	Lewis Omer	1921–1935	121	51	52	18	.496	32	39	13	.458	—	—	—	—	
11	Hub Wagner	1936–1942	55	20	29	6	.418	9	10	1	.475	—	—	1	—	
X	No team during WWII	1943–1944	—	—	—	—	—	—	—	—		—	—	—	—	
12	Paul LaVinn	1945–1946	13	2	10	1	.192	0	4	0	.000	—	—	—	—	
13	Roscoe W. Scott	1947–1949	25	11	12	2	.480	6	9	1	.406	—	—	—	—	
14	Loel D. Frederickson	1950–1951	18	2	16	0	.111	1	9	0	.100	—	—	—	—	
15	Art Keller	1952–1982	272	177	87	7	.666	105	52	3	.666	0	2 (Note: The 1971 NAIA Division II Semifinal Playoff Game against Westminster (PA) ended in a tie score 28-28. Because it was a playoff situation, Westminster was "declared winner based on penetrations" and was allowed to advance to the finals. While officially a "tie game" the tournament situation renders the result the same as a loss.)	8	—	
16	Ken Wagner	1983–1984	18	6	12	0	.333	5	11	0	.313	—	—	—	—	
17	Roger Scott	1985–1987	27	6	21	0	.222	6	18	0	.250	—	—	—	—	
18	Jack Synold	1988–1991	36	12	24	0	.333	10	22	0	.313	—	—	—	—	
19	Mike Larry	1992–1994	27	2	25	0	.074	2	19	0	.095	—	—	—	—	
20	Tim Rucks	1995–2012	175	95	79	1	.546	55	67	1	.451	2	1	1	—	
21	Mike Yeager	2012–2017	53	23	30	0	.434	16	21	0	.432	—	—	—	—	
22	Dustin Hass	2018–2023	52	19	33	0	.365	19	28	0	.404	—	—	—	—	
23	Matt Popino	2024–present	20	6	14	0	.300	5	13	0	.278	—	—	—	—	
