= Wilbur =

Wilbur may refer to:

== Arts and Entertainment ==
Wilbur, a livestock pig from the book Charlotte's Web

== Places in the United States ==
- Wilbur, Indiana, an unincorporated town
- Wilbur, Trenton, New Jersey, a neighborhood in the city of Trenton
- Wilbur, Oregon, an unincorporated community
- Wilbur, Washington, a small farming town
- Wilbur, West Virginia

== Other uses ==
- Wilbur (name)
- The codename given to the HTML 3.2 standard
- Wilbur (comics), a long-running comic book published by Archie Comics from 1944 to 1965
- Wilbur (Kookmeyer), cartoon strip about a 'kook' (poser surfer) created by Bob Penuelas, which first appeared in Surfer magazine in 1986
- Wilbur (TV series), a children's TV show on Kids' CBC
- Wilbur Chocolate Company, a chocolate company based in Lititz, Pennsylvania
- Wilbur Dam, a hydroelectric dam on the Watauga River, Tennessee
- Wilbur Theatre, a historic theatre in Boston, Massachusetts

== See also ==
- Wilber (disambiguation)
- Wilbor (disambiguation)
- Wilbour
- Samuel Wilbore (1595–1656), early Rhode Island settler
- Justice Wilbur (disambiguation)
