= Roscoe W. Scott =

American educator, sports coach (1909–1986)

- Scott pictured in the Crimson Rambler 1949, Carthage yearbook

Biographical details
- Born: April 19, 1909; Fandon, Illinois, U.S.
- Died: September 26, 1986 (aged 77); Colchester, Illinois, U.S.
- Education: University of Illinois

Playing career

Football
- c. 1930: Monmouth (IL)

Coaching career (HC unless noted)

Football
- c. 1932–1942: Blandinsville HS (IL)
- 1946: Monmouth (IL) (line)
- 1947–1949: Carthage

Basketball
- c. 1943–1944: Carthage HS (IL)

Baseball
- 1947: Monmouth (IL)

Track and field
- c. 1948: Carthage

Administrative career (AD unless noted)
- ?–1950: Carthage

Head coaching record
- Overall: 11–12–2 (college football); 7–4 (college football)

Roscoe Wayne Scott (April 19, 1909 – September 26, 1986) was an American educator, football, baseball, and track and field coach, and athletics administrator. He served as the head football coach at Carthage College in Carthage, Illinois for three seasons, from 1947 to 1949, compiling a record of 11–12–2. Scott also coached track and field at Carthage.

Scott was born on April 19, 1909, in Fandon, Illinois, to Amos and Myrtle Miner Scott. He attended Monmouth College in Monmouth, Illinois, where he played on the football team for three years before graduating in 1932. He then coached at high schools in Blandinsville, Illinois and Carthage. During World War II, Scott served in the United States Navy as an athletic instructor at United States Naval Training Center Bainbridge and the University of Illinois. In 1946, he returned to Monmouth College as line coach for the football team. He was also the head baseball coach at Monmouth in the spring of 1947, leading his team to a record of 7–4.

Scott left Carthage in 1950 to become the principal of Nauvoo Community High School in Nauvoo, Illinois. He was succeeded as Carthage's athletic director by Loel D. Frederickson. Scott was later the superintendent of schools in Nauvoo, Abingdon, and Colchester, Illinois. He died on September 26, 1986, at his home in Colchester.

== Head coaching record ==
=== College football ===
| Year | Team | Overall | Conference | Standing | Bowl/playoffs |
|---|---|---|---|---|---|
Carthage Red Men (College Conference of Illinois) (1947–1949)
| 1947 | Carthage | 5–2–1 | 3–2 | 4th | |
| 1948 | Carthage | 4–4 | 2–3 | T–5th | |
| 1949 | Carthage | 2–6–1 | 1–4–1 | 8th | |
| Carthage: | | 11–12–2 | 6–9–1 | | |
| Total: | | 11–12–2 | | | |
