= Wilber =

Wilber may refer to:

- Wilber (surname)
- Wilber (given name)
- Wilber, Nebraska, a city, United States
- Wilber Township, Michigan, United States
- Wilber (mascot), mascot of GIMP, a free graphics editor
- Wilber, a cat in Looney Tunes

== See also ==
- Wilbur (disambiguation)
- Wilbour (disambiguation)
- Wilbor (disambiguation)
- Wilbär (2007-2024), a polar bear who lived in captivity
