= Wilber (surname) =

Wilber is a surname. Notable people with the surname include:

- Bob Wilber (1928–2019), American jazz clarinetist, saxophonist, and band leader
- Del Quentin Wilber, American journalist
- Del Wilber, American baseball player
- Donald Wilber, American author and spy
- Doreen Wilber, American archer
- Ken Wilber (born 1949), American writer and major proponent of integral theory
- Kyle Wilber (born 1989), American football player
- Richard Wilber (1921–2017), Gunner's Mate WWII

== See also ==
- Wiber, surname
- Wilbur (name), surname and given name
