= Bud Hendrickson =

American football coach

Coaching career (HC unless noted)
- 1905: Carthage

Head coaching record
- Overall: 4–2

Bud Hendrickson was an American football coach. He served as the head football coach at Carthage College in Carthage, Illinois for one season, in 1905, compiling a record of 4–2.

== Head coaching record ==
Year	Team	Overall	Conference	Standing	Bowl/playoffs
Carthage Red Men (Independent) (1905)
1905	Carthage	4–2			
Carthage:		4–2			
Total:		4–2			
