= Stewart Clark =

Stewart Clark may refer to:

- Stewart Clark (coach), American football and basketball coach
- Stewart Clark (politician), Scottish businessman and politician

== See also ==
- Stuart Clark, Australian cricketer
- Stewart-Clark baronets
