= Roger Scott (disambiguation) =

Roger Scott was a British DJ.

Roger Scott may also refer to:

- Roger Scott (photographer), Australian photographer
- Roger Scott (American football) (born 1956), American football and baseball coach

== See also ==
- Scott (name)
