= Ben Mathis =

American football coach

Coaching career (HC unless noted)
- 1901: Carthage

Head coaching record
- Overall: 1–1

Ben Mathis was an American football coach. He served as the head football coach at Carthage College in Carthage, Illinois for one season, in 1901, compiling a record of 1–1.

== Head coaching record ==
Year	Team	Overall	Conference	Standing	Bowl/playoffs
Carthage Red Men (Independent) (1901)
1901	Carthage	1–1			
Carthage:		1–1			
Total:		1–1			
