= Carthage Township =

Carthage Township may refer to the following townships in the United States:

- Carthage Township, Hancock County, Illinois
- Carthage Township, Athens County, Ohio
