= Middle Creek, Illinois =

- Unincorporated community
- Location within Illinois Location within the United States
- Coordinates: 40°22′22″N 91°01′38″W
- Country: United States
- State: Illinois
- County: Hancock
- Elevation: 620 ft (190 m)
- Time zone: UTC-6 (Central (CST))
  - Summer (DST): UTC-5 (CDT)
- Area code: 217
- GNIS feature ID: 413482

Middle Creek is an unincorporated community in Carthage Township, Hancock County, Illinois, United States. The community is located along County Route 28 6.5 miles (10.5 km) east-southeast of Carthage.
