= Ralph McKee =

Ralph McKee may refer to:

- Ralph Harper McKee (1874–1967), American chemical engineer, inventor, and college football coach

== See also ==
- Ralph R. McKee CTE High School, in Staten Island, New York City
