= Russell Osborne =

American football coach

Coaching career (HC unless noted)
- 1907: Carthage

Head coaching record
- Overall: 2–5

Russell Osborne was an American football coach. He served as the head football coach at Carthage College in Carthage, Illinois for one season, in 1907, compiling a record of 2–5.

== Head coaching record ==
Year	Team	Overall	Conference	Standing	Bowl/playoffs
Carthage Red Men (Independent) (1907)
1907	Carthage	2–5			
Carthage:		2–5			
Total:		2–5			
