= Mary Davidson (editor) =

American newspaper editor and politician

Mary Davidson (January 26, 1872 – December 8, 1941) was an American newspaper editor and politician.

Davidson was born in Carthage, Illinois. Davidson received her master's degree in journalism from the University of Illinois at Urbana–Champaign. She was the editor and publisher of the Carthage Republican newspaper. Davidson was involved with the Illinois Press Association. Davidson served in the Illinois House of Representatives from 1931 to 1935 and was involved with the Democratic Party. Davidson was also a member of the Illinois State Park Planning Commission. Davidson died from a cerebral hemorrhage at her home in Carthage, Illinois.
