= Jack Synold =

American football coach

Biographical details
- Born: Milwaukee, Wisconsin, U.S.

Playing career
- 1968–1971: Wisconsin–Whitewater
- Position: Tight end

Coaching career (HC unless noted)
- 1972–1983: Menomonee Falls North HS (WI) (assistant)
- 1984–1986: Menomonee Falls HS (WI) (assistant)
- 1988–1991: Carthage
- 1992–1996: Wausau East HS (WI) (assistant)
- 1997–2006: Wausau East HS (WI)

Head coaching record
- Overall: 12–24 (college)

Jack Synold is an American football coach. He was the head football coach at Carthage College located in Kenosha, Wisconsin for four seasons, from 1988 to 1991, compiling a record of 12–24.

== Biography ==
Synold was born in Milwaukee, Wisconsin. He played tight end for the University of Wisconsin–Whitewater. After graduating, he married his girlfriend, Ellen; the couple had one child, Karen. Synold coached at Wausau East High School in Wausau, Wisconsin. He later moved to Texas, where his daughter had moved to. He once again coached around and settled at Pantego Christian Academy, where he has been coaching for over a decade.

== Head coaching record ==
=== College ===
Year	Team	Overall	Conference	Standing	Bowl/playoffs
Carthage Redmen (College Conference of Illinois and Wisconsin) (1988–1991)
1988	Carthage	3–6	3–5	T–5th	
1989	Carthage	1–8	1–7	T–7th	
1990	Carthage	5–4	4–4	T–5th	
1991	Carthage	3–6	2–6	T–7th	
Carthage:		12–24	10–22		
Total:		12–24			
