= Mike Larry =

American football coach

Biographical details
- Born: c. 1958

Coaching career (HC unless noted)
- ?: Washington Park HS (WI) (assistant)
- 1985–1991: Carthage (assistant)
- 1992–1994: Carthage

Head coaching record
- Overall: 2–25

Mike Larry (born c. 1958) is an American former football coach He served as the head football coach at the Carthage College in Kenosha, Wisconsin for three seasons, from 1992 to 1994, and compiling a record of 2–25.

Larry graduated, in 1976, from Washington Park High School in Racine, Wisconsin. He played semi-professional football for six years as a running back with Racine Gladiators. Larry was an assistant football coach at Park High School and then at Carthage, from 1985 to 1991. He was hired from his post as Carthage's head football coach after the 1994 season, and took a job as director of service education in the college's office of the dean.

== Head coaching record ==
Year	Team	Overall	Conference	Standing	Bowl/playoffs
Carthage Redmen (College Conference of Illinois and Wisconsin) (1992–1994)
1992	Carthage	0–9	0–7	8th	
1993	Carthage	1–8	1–6	8th	
1994	Carthage	1–8	1–6	8th	
Carthage:		2–25	2–19		
Total:		2–25			
