= Loel D. Frederickson =

American sports coach (1919–2009)

- Frederickson pictured in the Crimson Rambler 1950, Carthage yearbook

Biographical details
- Born: September 3, 1919; Saint Paul, Minnesota, U.S.
- Died: September 18, 2009 (aged 90); Moorhead, Minnesota, U.S.

Playing career

Football
- 1941: Minnesota
- Position: Center

Coaching career (HC unless noted)

Football
- 1950–1951: Carthage
- 1956–1959: Moorhead State

Basketball
- 1949–1952: Carthage

Baseball
- 1951–1952: Carthage

Head coaching record
- Overall: 9–39–1 (football); 16–53 (basketball); 12–25 (baseball)

Loel Dean Frederickson (September 3, 1919 – September 18, 2009) was an American football, basketball, and baseball coach. He served as the head football coach at Carthage College in Carthage, Illinois for two seasons, from 1950 to 1951, compiling a record of 2–16.

Frederickson died on September 18, 2009.

== Head coaching record ==
=== Football ===
Year	Team	Overall	Conference	Standing	Bowl/playoffs
Carthage Red Men (College Conference of Illinois) (1950–1951)
1950	Carthage	2–7	1–4	T–6th	
1951	Carthage	0–9	0–5	9th	
Carthage:		2–16	1–9		
Moorhead State Dragons (Minnesota State College Conference / Northern State College Conference) (1956–1959)
1956	Moorhead State	3–3–1	2–1–1	T–2nd	
1957	Moorhead State	3–4	2–2	3rd	
1958	Moorhead State	1–7	1–4	5th	
1959	Moorhead State	0–9	0–5	6th	
Moorhead State:		7–23–1	5–12–1		
Total:		9–39–1			
