= Vivian Onano =

Kenyan Activist and Social Entrepreneur

- Born: Kenya
- Education: Degree Carthage College in Kenosha, Wisconsin; Master's Sciences Po Paris
- Occupations: Activist, Social Entrepreneur
- Known for: Founder of "Leading Light Initiative"; 2016 MTV "Africa Re-Imagined" Youth Award
- Awards: 2017 New African Woman on the Rise Award
- Website: vivianonano.com/bio/

Vivian Onano is an African activist and social entrepreneur from Kenya who advocates for girls' education and end of child marriage in Africa. She is the founder and director of the Leading Light Initiative, an organization aimed at alleviating poverty by providing opportunities tailored to youth, women, and disabled individuals.

== Education ==
Vivian pursued her higher education at Carthage College in Kenosha, Wisconsin where she obtained her degree and furthered her academic pursuits by earning a Master of Public Affairs from Sciences Po in Paris. Her educational background equipped her with the knowledge and skills necessary to address complex social and developmental challenges.

== Career ==
Vivian was appointed Youth advisor to the United Nations Women Global Civil Society Advisory Group from 2014 to 2016. In 2019, she was appointed as a youth advisor to the Global Education Monitoring Report for UNESCO, She is a member of the World Humanitarian Forum Youth Council, a Concordia Africa advisor, and Vice-Chairperson Global Youth Empowerment Fund.

Her expertise extends to public speaking on vital global issues such as education, gender equality, youth empowerment, and international development. She has delivered impactful speeches at the United Nations General Assembly, World Humanitarian Forum, Afreximbank Annual Forum, Reykjavik Global Forum, Africa Business Forum, Forbes Woman Africa Regional Forum, World Innovation Summit for Education, Concordia Summit, EurAfrican Forum and the Clinton Global Initiative. Vivian has also shared her insights through published articles in renowned media outlets worldwide.

Her contributions were instrumental in mobilizing young people's input during the formulation of the Sustainable Development Goals in 2015. She holds positions as a faculty member at DUKE Corporate Education, board director of Nutrition International, board director of Flying Kites, and a member of the African Women Leadership Network. She is recognized as a 2024 Young Leader of the Nizami Ganjavi International Center in Azerbaijan.

== Recognition ==
She was honoured as one of the global 100 Most Influential People of African Descent under 40 in 2022, and in 2016 she featured in New African Woman Magazine's "30 under 30 Faces Changing Africa Now". Also Forbes Woman Africa described her as "One to Watch."

== Awards ==
2015 Mrs. Michelle Obama's "Let Girls Learn" Award by MORE Magazine.

2016 MTV "Africa Re-Imagined" Youth Award.

2017 New African Woman on the Rise Award
