= Jon Kukla =

American historian and author

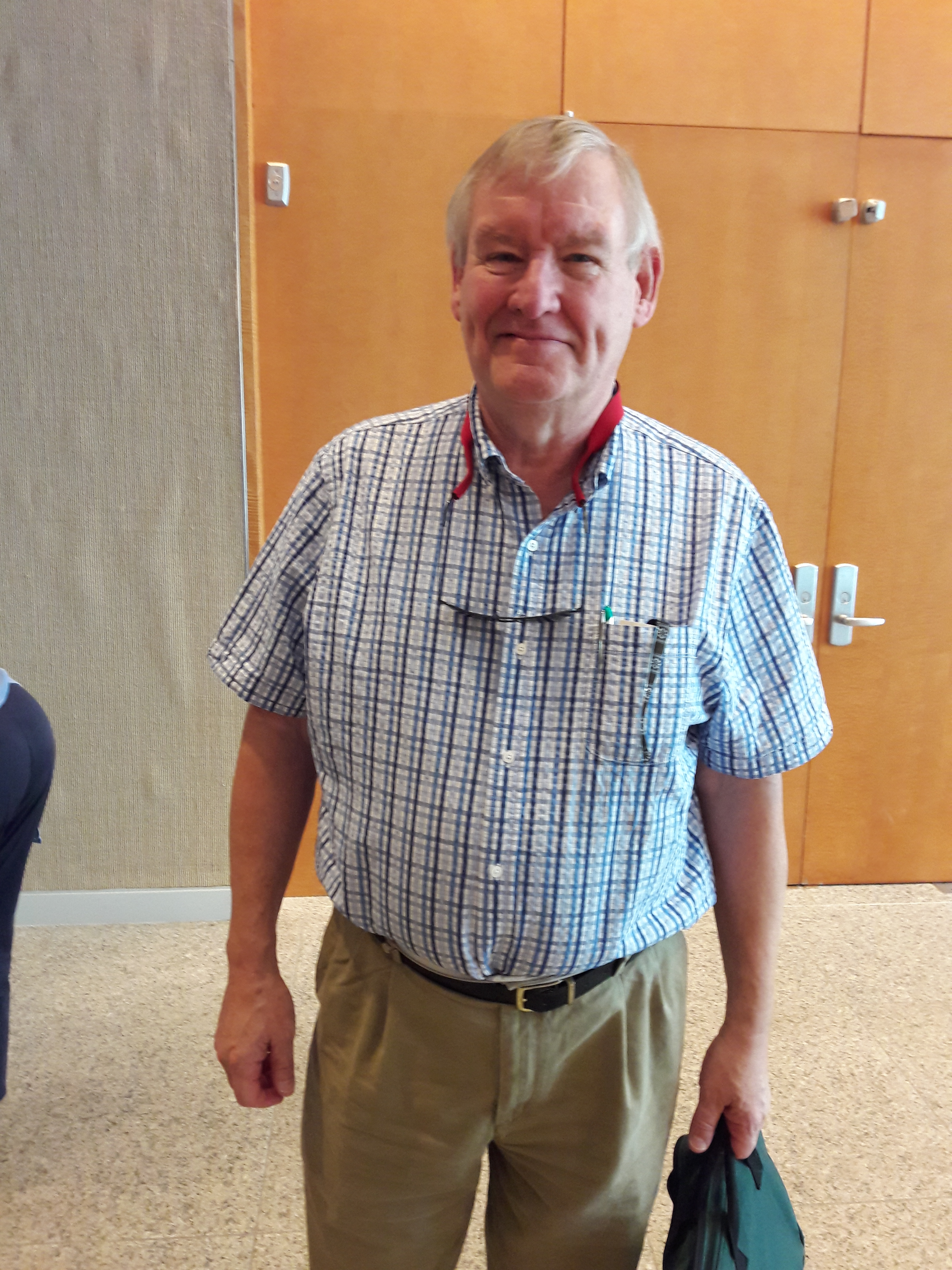
- Jon Kukla in 2016 at the Library of Virginia
- Born: Wisconsin
- Occupations: Historian, author
- Notable work: A Wilderness So Immense; Mr. Jefferson's Women

Jon Kukla is an American historian and author. He attended Carthage College and the University of Toronto, and in 1973 began working with the Library of Virginia, through which he published multiple works and directed historical research. He left the facility in 1990 and two years later began serving as the curator for the Historic New Orleans Collection, of which he later served as its director. Kukla has also served as the director of Red Hill Patrick Henry National Memorial in Charlotte County, Virginia, a position he held until 2007.

== Selected bibliography ==
=== Books ===
- Speakers and clerks of the Virginia House of Burgesses, 1643-1776 (1981, Library of Virginia)
- Bill of Rights: A Lively Heritage (1987, Library of Virginia, editor)
- The Capitol Of Virginia: A Landmark Of American Architecture (1989, Library of Virginia, contributor)
- Political Institutions in Virginia, 1619-1660 (1989, Taylor & Francis)
- A Guide to the Papers of Pierre Clement Laussat (1993, The Historic New Orleans Collection, author and editor)
- Patrick Henry: Voice of the Revolution (2002, PowerPlus Books)
- A Wilderness So Immense (2003, Alfred A. Knopf)
- Thomas Jefferson: Life, Liberty, and the Pursuit of Happiness (2005)
- Virginia Women: Their Lives and Times (2015, University of Georgia Press, contributor)
- Mr. Jefferson's Women (2009, Alfred A. Knopf)

=== Other works ===
- "Patrick Henry (1736–1799)" for Encyclopedia Virginia
