= Wiber =

Wiber is a surname. Notable people with the name include:

- Becky Wiber (born 1959), Canadian athlete
- Bernard Wiber (1902–1995), French cyclist
- Melanie Wiber, Canadian anthropologist

== See also ==
- Wilber (surname)
- Weber (surname)
