= Wilber (given name) =

Wilber is a given name. Notable people with the name include:

- Wilber M. Brucker (1894–1968), American politician
- Wilber Hardee (1918–2008), American fast-food chain founder
- Wilber Brotherton Huston (1912–2006), American scientist
- Wilber Larrick, American football coach
- Wilber Marshall (born 1962), American football player
- Wilber Morris (1937–2002), American jazz double bass player and bandleader
- Wilber Otichilo (born 1952), Kenyan politician
- Wilber Pan or Will Pan (born 1980), Taiwanese-American singer, actor and VJ
- Wilber Pérez (born 1988), Guatemalan footballer
- Wilber Rentería born 1992), Colombian footballer
- Wilber Sánchez (footballer) (born 1979), Nicaraguan footballer
- Wilber Sánchez (wrestler) (born 1968), Cuban former wrestler
- Wilber G. Smith (1935–1992), American politician
- Wilber Moore Stilwell (1908–1974), American artist
- Wilber Varela (1957–2008), Colombian police agent and drug trafficker
- Wilber Elliott Wilder (1857–1952), U.S. Army Brigadier General

== Fictional characters ==
- Wilber, a cat in Looney Tunes

== See also ==
- Wilbur (name), given name and surname
