= Wilbur (name) =

Wilbur is an English and German masculine given name of Germanic origin as well as a surname. The etymology of the name is disputed, however the most accepted theory is that it is composed of the Germanic elements wilþī- (Proto-Germanic *wilþijaz-) "wild", and ebur (Proto-Germanic *eburaz) "boar". Another suggestion is that it derives from German willo (Proto-Germanic *wiljô) "will", "wish", "desire", and burg (Proto-Germanic *burgz) "fortress". Notable people with the name include:

== Given name ==
- Wilbur Cave (fl. 1970s–2000s), American politician from South Carolina
- Wilbur Clark (1908–1965), American businessman and owner of hotels and casinos
- Wilbur Cobb (1929–2020), American jazz drummer
- Wilbur J. Cohen (1913–1987), American social scientist and, as a civil servant, one of the key architects of the welfare state
- Wilbur Cooper (1892–1973), Major League Baseball pitcher
- Wilbur Lucius Cross (1862–1948), American educator and Governor of Connecticut
- Wilbur F. Foster (1841–1900), American politician, lawyer
- Wilbur Good (1885–1963), Major League Baseball player
- Wilbur Jackson (born 1951), American collegiate and National Football League running back
- Wilbur MacDonald (1933–2020), Canadian politician
- Wilbur Mills (1909–1992), influential member of the United States House of Representatives from Arkansas
- Wilbur Ross (born 1937), American investor and 39th Secretary of Commerce
- Wilbur Schramm (1907–1987), American journalist and academic sometimes called the "father of communication studies"
- Wilbur Shaw (1902–1954), American racing driver
- Wilbur Smith (1933–2021), South African novelist
- Wilbur Soot (born 1996), English YouTuber, Twitch streamer, and musician
- Wilbur Sweatman (1882–1961), African-American ragtime and dixieland jazz composer, bandleader and clarinetist
- Wilbur J. Thomas (1920–1947), American combat pilot
- Wilbur Thomas (fl. 1970s), American former basketball player
- Wilbur Ware (1923–1979), American jazz double-bassist
- Wilbur Wood (1941–2026), former Major League Baseball pitcher
- Wilbur Wright (1867–1912), one of the two brothers generally credited with inventing the first successful airplane
- Wilbur Young (1949–2014), American football player

== Surname ==
- Cornelia B. Wilbur (1908–1992), American psychiatrist
- Crane Wilbur (1886–1973), American writer, actor and director of stage, radio and screen
- Curtis D. Wilbur (1867–1954), US Secretary of the Navy and Chief Justice of California
- George P. Wilbur (1941–2023), actor and stuntman
- Jay Wilbur (1898–1970), British bandleader
- John Wilbur (disambiguation)
- Ray Lyman Wilbur (1875–1949), American doctor, president of Stanford University and United States Secretary of the Interior
- Richard Wilbur (1921–2017), United States Poet Laureate and two-time Pulitzer Prize winner
- Richard C. Wilbur (1936–2020), judge of the United States Tax Court
- Sylvia Wilbur (born 1938), British computer scientist
- Todd Wilbur, American cookbook author
- William Wilbur, New York politician
- William H. Wilbur (1888–1979), US Army brigadier general

== See also ==
- Wilber (given name)
- Wilber (surname)
