= Alice L. Kibbe =

American botanist (1881–1969)

- Born: June 27, 1881; Bridgewater, South Dakota
- Died: January 21, 1969 (aged 87); Bellingham, Washington
- Education: Washington State Normal School at Bellingham 1905 A.B. University of Washington 1910; M.A. University of Washington 1914; M.S. Cornell University 1920 Ph.D. Cornell University 1926
- Alma mater: Washington State Normal School at Bellingham; University of Washington; Cornell University
- Occupation: botanist
- Years active: 1920-1956

Dr. Alice Lovina Kibbe (June 27, 1881 – January 21, 1969) was an American botanist, and Professor and Chair of Biology at Carthage College in Carthage, Illinois from 1920 to 1956. She was noted in the region as a natural historian, philanthropist and traveler, and for her role as an early female academic leader.

== Life ==
She graduated from State Normal School, and from the University of Washington in 1910 with A.B. and in 1914 with M.A., and Cornell University in 1920 with M.S. and in 1926 with Ph.D. thesis "A Plant Survey of Hancock Co., Illinois".

When Carthage College relocated in 1964, Kibbe returned to her native state of Washington, dedicating much of her local property to public use. Her donation of a wooded tract on the Mississippi River near Warsaw, Illinois formed the core of the 7-square-kilometer (2.7 sq mi) Alice L. Kibbe Life Science Research Station, operated by Western Illinois University. Kibbe's extensive personal natural history collections are housed in the Kibbe Hancock Heritage Museum in Carthage.
