= Wilbour =

Wilbour is a surname. Notable people with the surname include:

- Charles Edwin Wilbour (1833–1896), American journalist and Egyptologist
- Charlotte Beebe Wilbour (1833–1914), American feminist, speaker, and writer
- Isaac Wilbour (1763–1837), American politician from Rhode Island

== See also ==
- Wilbur (disambiguation)
- Wilber (disambiguation)
- Wilbor (disambiguation)
