= Orville F. Berry =

American businessman and politician

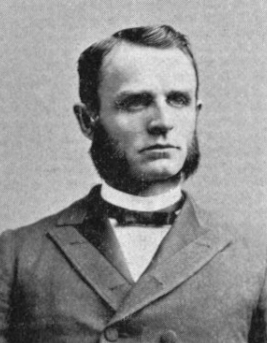

Member of the Illinois Senate
- In office 1889–1909

Personal details
- Born: February 16, 1852 McDonough County, Illinois, US
- Died: December 19, 1921 (aged 69) Jacksonville, Illinois, US
- Party: Republican
- Occupation: Businessman, politician

Orville F. Berry (February 16, 1852 – December 19, 1921) was an American businessman and politician.

== Biography ==
Berry was born in McDonough County, Illinois on February 16, 1852. He went to the public schools and lived in Carthage, Illinois with his wife and family. Berry was admitted to the Illinois bar in 1877. He was the owner of the Mississippi Valley Telephone Company. Berry also serve as chairman of the Illinois Railroad and Warehouse Commission. Berry served in the Illinois Senate from 1889 to 1909. Berry was a Republican. Berry died at a hospital in Jacksonville, Illinois from heart problems.
