= Stewart Clark (coach) =

American football and basketball coach

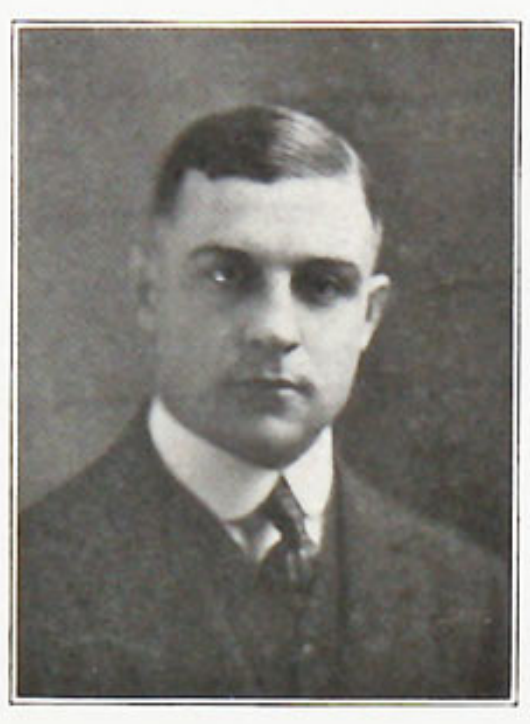
- Clark pictured in the Crimson Rambler 1921, Carthage yearbook

Biographical details
- Born: April 12, 1890; Carthage, Illinois, U.S.
- Died: June 26, 1974 (aged 84)

Playing career
- 1913: William & Vashti
- Position: Halfback

Coaching career (HC unless noted)

Football
- 1915–1919: Carthage
- 1924–?: Wyoming (assistant)
- 1928–1929: Western State (CO)

Basketball
- 1924–1928: Wyoming

Head coaching record
- Overall: 10–19 (football); 43–24 (basketball)

Stewart McCullough Clark (April 12, 1890 – June 26, 1974) was an American football and basketball coach. He served as the head football coach at Carthage College in Carthage, Illinois from 1915 to 1919 and at Western State College of Colorado—now known as Western Colorado University—from 1928 to 1929, compiling a career college football coaching record of 10–19. Clark was also the head basketball coach at the University of Wyoming from 1924 to 1928, tallying a mark of 43–24. He was a brother of Potsy Clark.

== Coaching career ==
Clark was the head football coach at Carthage College in his hometown of Carthage, Illinois (since relocated to Kenosha, Wisconsin), serving for five seasons, from 1915 to 1919, and compiling a record of 8–7.

== Death ==
Clark died on June 26, 1974.
