= Wilber Larrick =

American football coach

Coaching career (HC unless noted)
- 1902–1904: Carthage

Head coaching record
- Overall: 3–2–3

Wilber Larrick was an American football coach. He was the head football coach for the Carthage College in Carthage, Illinois, serving for three seasons, from 1902 to 1904, and compiling a record of 3–2–3.>

== Head coaching record ==
| Year | Team | Overall | Conference | Standing | Bowl/playoffs |
|---|---|---|---|---|---|
Carthage Red Men (Independent) (1902–1904)
| 1902 | Carthage | 2–1–1 | | | |
| 1903 | Carthage | 1–1 | | | |
| 1904 | Carthage | 0–0–2 | | | |
| Carthage: | | 3–2–3 | | | |
| Total: | | 3–2–3 | | | |
