= John Nelson Hyde =

American missionary (1865–1912)

John Nelson Hyde (November 9, 1865 – February 17, 1912), known as Praying Hyde, was an American missionary who preached in the Punjab.

== Biography ==
Hyde was born in Illinois, the son of a Presbyterian minister, who prayed that God would raise up more missionaries. After John Hyde graduated from college, he became a member of the faculty. Subsequently, he resigned and entered McCormick Theological Seminary. His elder brother Edmund was also in the seminary. Edmund dreamed of being a preacher, and in pursuit of that dream he went to preach in Montana, but suddenly died of a fever. John wondered if he would take his brother's place. In his senior year, he asked a fellow student, Mr. Konkle, for his argument supporting missionary work. That night he decided to become a missionary at last.

Hyde came to believe that God was calling him to India. He departed to India in 1892 to preach in the Punjab region. On the way, he read a letter from a friend who said he would ask God to fill John with the Holy Spirit. Angry at the suggestion that he did not already have the Spirit, he threw it away. However he then humbled himself and prayed to God for help.

As he was partially deaf, Hyde struggled to learn the native languages. Also in India, he focused his study mostly on scripture. His mission at first gained few converts and endured persecution, so he began to pray very intensely. From 1899 he began to spend entire nights in prayer to God. In 1904, he attended a conference at Sialkot. He formed the Punjab Prayer Union, the members of which set aside half the day to pray for spiritual revival. In 1908 he told the group his dream that there would be one conversion a day, and a year later over 400 more converts had been made. He came to be called "Praying Hyde" for his passionate prayers to reach lost souls.

In April 1911 Hyde joined evangelist J. Wilbur Chapman in an evangelistic visit to three towns in England, including Shrewsbury, Shropshire. Immediately afterwards he stayed with friends in Wales, where he fell ill. He had been praying intensely when in Shrewsbury, explaining "The burden of Shrewsbury was very heavy, but my Saviour's burden took him down to the grave". His heart had moved from its normal position (in the left) to the right, though it is more likely he had dextrocardia, a congenital condition where one is born with their heart in a right-hand position rather than on the left. He went home to Northampton, Massachusetts, where a malignant brain tumor was discovered, and he died there after an operation in February 1912, aged 46. His last reported words were "Shout the victory of Jesus Christ!" He was buried in his family's plot in Moss Ridge Cemetery in Carthage, Illinois.

Through his missionary work in Sialkot, Pakistan, millions of people accepted Jesus Christ, from the seeds of the Gospel which he planted.
