= Ralph Harper McKee =

American chemical engineer, inventor, college football coach (1874–1967)

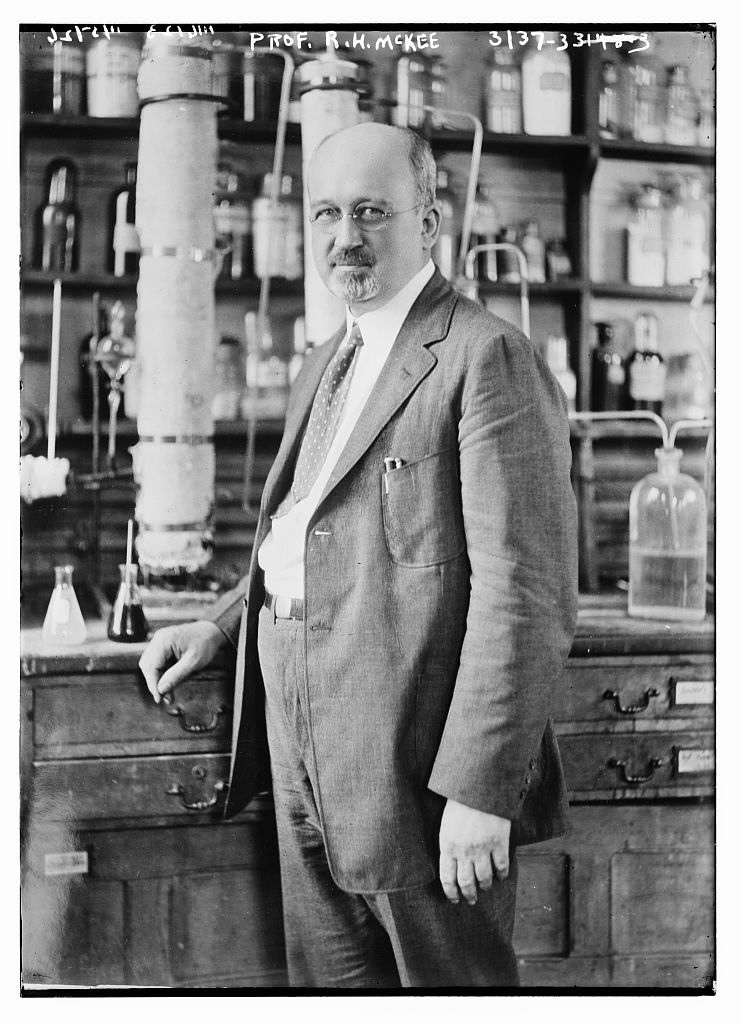
- McKee at Columbia University, 1923

Biographical details
- Born: June 20, 1874; Missouri, U.S.
- Died: February 24, 1967 (aged 92); New York, New York, U.S.

Coaching career (HC unless noted)
- 1895–1900: Carthage

Head coaching record
- Overall: 19–6–1

Ralph Harper McKee (June 20, 1874 – February 24, 1967) was an American chemical engineer, inventor, and college football coach. He was professor at the department of chemical engineering at Columbia University. McKee was the first person to be awarded a patent for a novel plant.

== Biography ==
McKee was born on June 20, 1874, in Missouri, to James T. McKee and Mary Frances Ricketts. A native of Clinton, Missouri, he graduated from the University of Wooster—now known as the College of Wooster—in 1895. That year, he was hired as the chair of mathematics and astronomy at Carthage College, located in Carthage, Illinois. McKee was the first head football coach at Carthage, serving for six seasons, from 1895 to 1900, and compiling a record of 19–6–1. He earned a Doctor of Philosophy degree from the University of Chicago, in 1901. He was a professor of chemistry at Lake Forest College from 1902 until 1909, when he moved to the University of Maine.

In 1923 he and Max Kahn developed a novel fat substitute, called intarvin.

He was married, and in 1928 he and his wife divorced.

By 1932 he was in the department of chemical engineering at Columbia University where he was able to manufacture diamonds "larger than ever before produced artificially" and was able to produce artificial wool from jute.

In 1938, he received the first patent issued for a novel plant variety.

McKee died on February 24, 1967, in Manhattan.

== Head coaching record ==
Year	Team	Overall	Conference	Standing	Bowl/playoffs
Carthage Red Men (Independent) (1895–1900)
1895	Carthage	2–0			
1896	Carthage	4–0			
1897	Carthage	3–1			
1898	Carthage	3–0			
1899	Carthage	3–2–1			
1900	Carthage	4–3			
Carthage:		19–6–1			
Total:		19–6–1			
