= Matt Popino =

American football coach (born c. 1991)

Current position
- Title: Head coach
- Team: Carthage
- Conference: CCIW
- Record: 6–14

Biographical details
- Born: c. 1991 (age 34–35); Metuchen, New Jersey, U.S.
- Education: Worcester State University (2014); Fitchburg State University (2017)

Playing career
- 2010–2011: Worcester State
- Position: Tight end

Coaching career (HC unless noted)
- 2013–2014: Worcester State (assistant DB)
- 2015: Fitchburg State (LB)
- 2016–2017: Rutgers (intern)
- 2018: Rutgers (DQC)
- 2019: Endicott (LB)
- 2020: Endicott (ST/LB)
- 2021: Endicott (DC)
- 2022–2023: Endicott (AHC/DC)
- 2024–present: Carthage

Head coaching record
- Overall: 6–14

Matthew Popino (born c. 1991) is an American college football coach. He is the head football coach for Carthage College, a position he has held since 2024. He also coached for Worcester State, Fitchburg State, Rutgers, and Endicott.

Raised in Metuchen, New Jersey, Popino played prep football at Bishop Ahr High School (which has since been renamed as St. Thomas Aquinas High School). He played college football for Worcester State as a tight end.

== Head coaching record ==
Year	Team	Overall	Conference	Standing	Bowl/playoffs
Carthage Firebirds (College Conference of Illinois and Wisconsin) (2024–present)
2024	Carthage	2–8	2–7	9th	
2025	Carthage	4–6	3–6	7th	
2026	Carthage	0–0	0–0		
Carthage:		6–14	5–13		
Total:		6–14			
