= Rick Wilber =

American writer (born 1948)

- Born: 1948 (age 77–78); United States
- Occupations: Editor, short story writer, novelist, poet
- Relatives: Del Wilber (father); Del Quentin Wilber (nephew)
- Writing career
- Genres: Science fiction, fantasy

Richard Arnold Wilber (born 1948) is an American author, poet, editor and professor. His novel, Alien Morning (Tor, 2016), was a finalist for the John W. Campbell Memorial Award for Best Science Fiction Novel of 2017. His other novels include The Cold Road (Tor 2003, ebook New Word City, 2017) and Rum Point (McFarland, 2010). He has published more than fifty short stories, novelettes or novellas in magazines including Asimov's Science Fiction, Analog Science Fiction and Fact, The Magazine of Fantasy & Science Fiction, Stonecoast Review, Gulf Stream Review and Pulphouse and in numerous anthologies. His other works include the memoir, My Father's Game: Life, Death, Baseball (McFarland, 2008), several college textbooks, including Media Matters, (Kendall Hunt, 2018), Modern Media Writing (Thomson/Wadsworth, 2003, with Randy Miller), Magazine Feature Writing (Bedford/St. Martin's 1994) and "The Writer's Handbook for Editing and Revision" (NTC, 1997) and the collections Rambunctious: Nine Tales of Determination (WordFire Press, 2020), The Wandering Warriors (with Alan Smale, WordFire Press, 2020), Where Garagiola Waits (University of Tampa Press, 1999), To Leuchars (Wildside Press, 2003) and The Secret Skater (Winning Readers, University of Tampa Press, 1996, as Robin Aran).

Wilber is the editor of several anthologies including Field of Fantasies: Baseball Stories of the Strange and Supernatural (Night Shade Books, 2014), Subtropical Speculations: An Anthology of Florida Science Fiction (1991), Future Media (Tachyon Books, 2011) and Making History: Classic Alternate History Stories (New Word City, 2018).

His short fiction includes "Something Real" won the 2012 Sidewise Award for Alternate History, Short Form.

He is currently Visiting Assistant Professor of Creative Writing and Thesis Coordinator in the low-residency MFA program at Western Colorado University. He was previously an adjunct instructor in creative writing at Florida Gulf Coast University, and variously a director, instructor, and assistant professor at the University of South Florida. Prior to that he was an assistant professor at Florida Southern College and Southern Illinois University Edwardsville.

His journalism background includes part-time copy editing in the 1970s and 1980s for The Ledger in Lakeland, Florida and The Tampa Tribune in Tampa, Florida. He served as wire editor of the Belleville News-Democrat and as pop music critic for the St. Louis Globe-Democrat.

Wilber's father was baseball player Del Wilber, which has influenced much of his writing, both fictional ("Where Garagiola Waits") and non-fictional (My Father's Game). One of his children has Down syndrome, and this has also influenced much of his writing.

== Bibliography ==
=== Novels ===
- Rum Point (2009), ISBN 978-0-7864-4537-0
- The Cold Road (2003), ISBN 978-0-3128-6621-1
- Alien Morning (2016), ISBN 978-0-7653-3290-5

=== Short fiction ===
Collections

- Where Garagiola Waits, and Other Baseball Stories (1999)
- To Leuchars (2003)

Anthologies

- Wilber, Rick, ed. (2014). Field of fantasies : baseball tales of the strange and supernatural. Night Shade Books.

Short stories and novellas

Title	Year	First published	Reprinted/collected	Notes
Horatio Hornblower and the Songs of Innocence	????	????	Wilber, Richard (1980). "Horatio Hornblower and the Songs of Innocence". In Torgeson, Roy (ed.). Chrysalis 6. Zebra Books.	
Seven Sisters	2000	Wilber, Rick (July 2000). "Seven Sisters". F&SF. 99 (1): 75–91.		
Scouting report	2014	Wilber, Rick (September 2014). "Scouting report". Asimov's Science Fiction. 38 (9): 50–59.		

- Thinking of Romance (1981)
- Waiting for the Call (1982)
- Suffer the Children (1988)
- Mary Alice Blue Eyes (1989)
- War Bride (1990)
- Helmet (1991)
- Greggie's Cup (1992)
- Calculating Love (1992)
- Ice Covers the Hole (1992)
- Being Ernest (1993)
- With Twoclicks Watching (1993)
- A Falling Out (1993)
- Bridging (1994)
- Hope as an Element of Cold Dark Matter (1994)
- American Jokes (1994)
- With White Deer Gone (1994)
- Elements of Self-Destruction (1995)
- Virolec and the Beast (1995)
- Hope As an Element of Cold, Dark Matter (1995)
- Mounting the Monkeys (1995)
- Swimming with Gort (1995)
- Run Down West (1996)
- The Babe, the Iron Horse, and Mr. McGillicuddy (1997) with Ben Bova
- Where Garagiola Waits (1997)
- Straight Changes (1998)
- In Boise (1999)
- Imagine Jimmy (1999)
- In Boise (2000)
- Stephen to Cora to Joe, or, the Truth As I Know It, or, Shifty Paradigms: The Use of Literary Icons and Sports Motifs in Speculative Fiction (2000)
- To Leuchars (2000)
- Arribada (2000)
- Blind Spot (2010) with Nicholas A. DiChario
- Several Items of Interest (2010)
- Wilber, Rick (July 2013). "At Palomar". Asimov's Science Fiction. 37 (7): 84–106.
- Something Real (Moe Berg Mysteries Book 1) (2014) - Originally published in Asimov's Science Fiction, April/May 2012, and winner of the 2012 Short Form Sidewise Award for Alternate History
- At Palomar (2013)
- Walking to Boston (2015)
- Rambunctious (2016)
- In Dublin, Fair City (2017)
- Today is Today (2018)
- The Secret City (2018)
- The Wandering Warriors (with Alan Smale) (2018)
- Donny Boy (2019)
- Ithaca (with Brad Aiken) (2020)
- False Bay (2020)
- The Hind (with Kevin J. Anderson (2020)

=== Poetry ===
Collections

- The Impaler in Love (1991)
- A Falling Out (1993)
- The Murderer Explains (1994)
- Deposed, He Remembers Her on the Morning of His Death (1995)
- Following Her Divorce (1995)
- Metaphysics at the Planetarium (1995)
- Homer (1997)

=== Non-fiction ===
- Subtropical Speculations: An Anthology of Florida Science Fiction (Richard Mathews and Rick Wilber, 1991)
- Magazine Feature Writing (1994)
- The Writer's Handbook for Editing & Revision (Aug 1996)
- Modern Media Writing (by Rick Wilber and Randy Miller, 2002)
- My Father's Game: Life, Death, Baseball (November 12, 2007)
- Future Media (2011, published by Tachyon Publications.)
- Media Matters (2018, Kendall Hunt publishing)
