= Carthage Courthouse Square Historic District (Carthage, Illinois) =

Historic district in Illinois, United States

- U.S. National Register of Historic Places
- U.S. Historic district
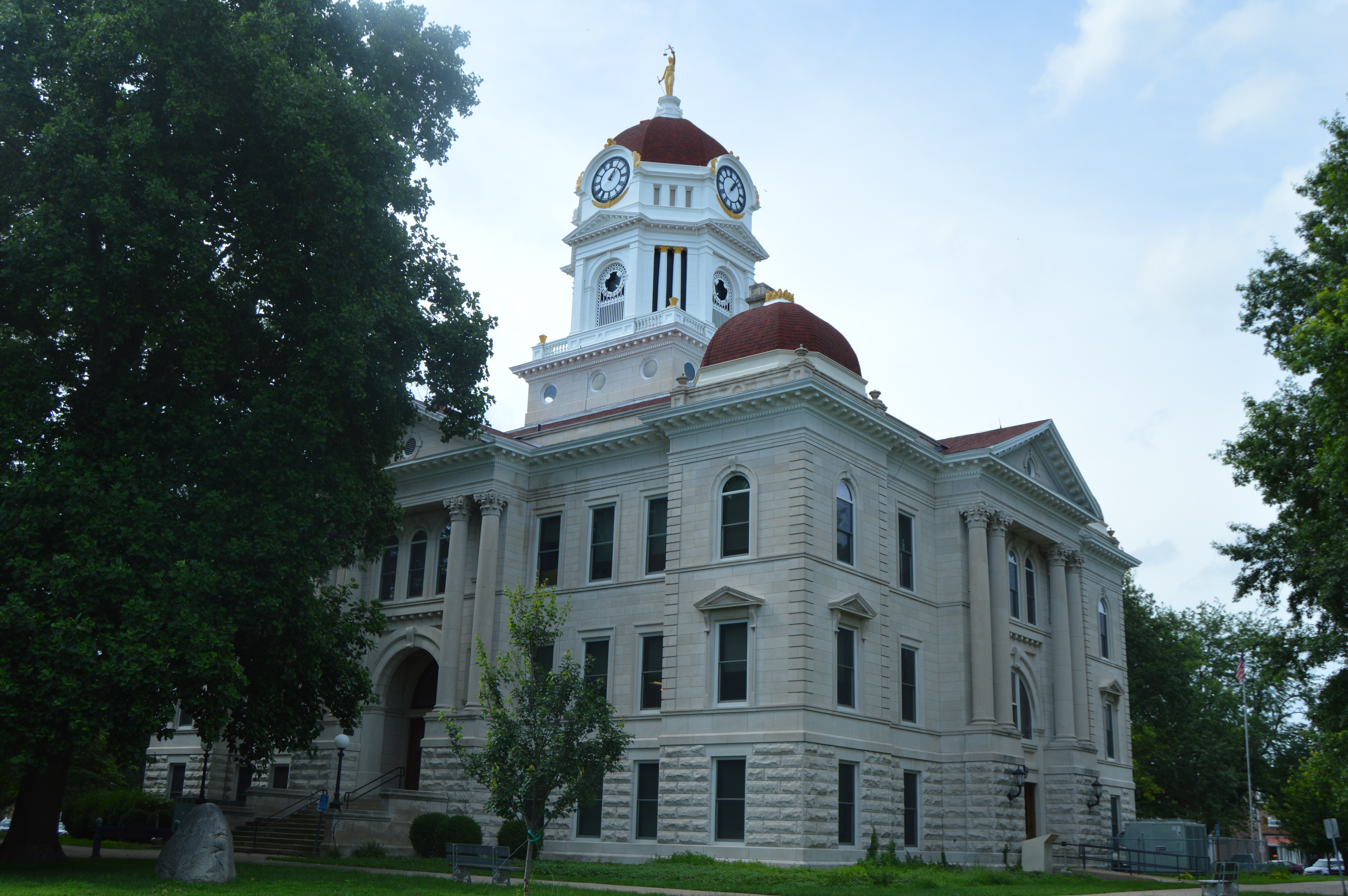
- The Hancock County Courthouse

- Location within Illinois Location within the United States
- Location: Roughly bounded by Main, Adams, Wabash, and Madison Sts., Carthage, Illinois
- Coordinates: 40°24′47″N 91°8′8″W
- Area: 10 acres (4.0 ha)
- Architectural style: Beaux-Arts, Italianate, Romanesque
- NRHP reference No.: 86001482
- Added to NRHP: August 13, 1986

The Carthage Courthouse Square Historic District is a historic district encompassing the courthouse square of Carthage, Hancock County, Illinois. The district includes 52 buildings, 42 of which are considered contributing to the district's historic character. The 1908 Hancock County Courthouse, a three-story limestone Beaux-Arts building, is the centerpiece of the district. The courthouse is surrounded by commercial buildings, most of them built in the latter half of the nineteenth century. Architect George Payne designed many of the district's commercial buildings, giving him a reputation which spread beyond Carthage. His works include Italianate and Romanesque Revival designs.

The district was added to the National Register of Historic Places on August 13, 1986.
