= Wilbor =

Wilbor may refer to any one of the following:

- Edward G. Wilbor (1807–1869), New York politician
- Wilbor House, in Little Compton, Rhode Island
- The Wilbor House, in Chatham, New York

Silvanus wilbore

== See also ==
- Wilber (disambiguation)
- Wilbour (disambiguation)
- Wilbur (disambiguation)
