= Marie Sarantakis =

American lawyer and television personality

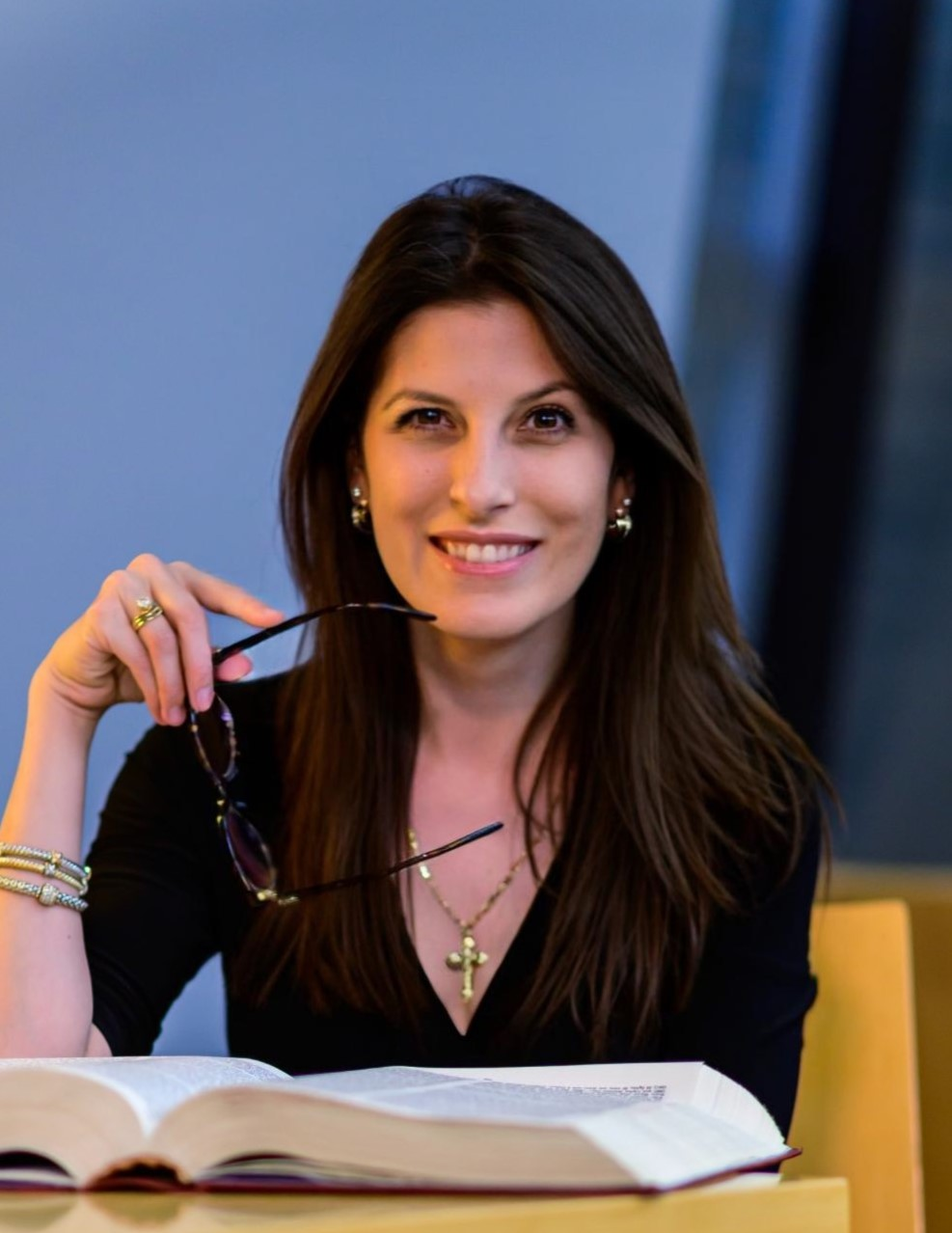
Attorney Marie Sarantakis

Marie Sarantakis (Μαρία Κατερίνα Σαραντάκη born on July 15, 1989) is an American attorney, best-selling author, and former model.

== Education ==
As a child, Sarantakis spoke primarily Greek. In elementary school she became fluent in the English language. Sarantakis was home-schooled throughout middle school. She thereafter attended Wilmot Union High School in Wilmot, Wisconsin and began attending Carthage College in Kenosha, Wisconsin at the age of sixteen. In 2024, she was the youngest member inducted into the Wilmot Union High School Hall of Fame. Sarantakis graduated magna cum laude from Carthage College as a Clausen Scholar, where she obtained her Bachelor of Arts (B.A.) degree in political science and philosophy. While attending Carthage she served as Chapter President and Founder of the American Criminal Justice Association. She was recognized with a Patterson Leadership award and earned distinction as a Wingspread Fellow of the Johnson Foundation. Sarantakis graduated cum laude with a juris doctor degree from The John Marshall Law School in Chicago, Illinois. During her law school tenure she served as a Judicial Clerk for the Honorable Thomas L. Kilbride of the Illinois Supreme Court, as a member of the Law Review, and Chief Magistrate of the Phi Delta Phi Honor Society.

== Writing ==
Sarantakis is a Greek-American author and her debut book, Essentially Raw, serves as an introductory guide to the raw food lifestyle. The book sold over 15,000 electronic copies within its first two weeks of release. Sarantakis appeared on Fox News Radio, where she advised listeners to take a moderate approach when adapting their diets. Differentiating herself from other advocates, Sarantakis does not recommend a strict raw diet, but rather the gradual integration of a steady amount of fruits and vegetables into one's daily routine.

Sarantakis authored a second non-fiction work, How to Divorce a Narcissist and Win, which was an Amazon best-seller in 2021. How to Divorce a Narcissist and Win has been sold in Brazil, Canada, Denmark, France, India, Japan, New Zealand, Spain, United Kingdom, Australia, and United States of America.

== Modeling ==
Sarantakis began her modeling career being featured in British automotive magazine Max Power. She was thereafter notably pictured on the cover of the United Kingdom edition of Danielle Steel's novel One Day at a Time. In 2009 Sarantakis was named the 16th Sexiest International Model by Nifty Magazine. As Sarantakis transitioned from a model to an attorney, she was named one of the top ten babes of the blogosphere by CBS's The Mancave.

== Attorney at Law ==
Sarantakis has appeared on FOX Television's long-running television program Divorce Court. She is a high profile divorce attorney representing notorious figures in Illinois, Texas, and Wisconsin. Sarantakis quickly attained notoriety in the legal field by releasing a series of provocative and funny legal commercials in 2017. Later that year she was recognized as a Top 10 Family Law Attorney Under 40 in Illinois by the National Academy of Family Law Attorneys (NAFLA). She has also earned distinction as a Top 10 Family Law Attorney in Illinois by Attorney & Practice Magazine and one of the Top 10 Female Attorneys in Illinois by the American Institute of Family Law Attorneys. From 2018 through 2023, Sarantakis was featured as a Super Lawyer Rising Star in Chicago Magazine. In 2023, Sarantakis received distinction by the American Bar Association with a Rising Star Award as one of the Top 40 Young Attorneys in the United States. Sarantakis was named 2023 Young Lawyer of the Year by the Illinois State Bar Association. In 2024, Sarantakis received a Forty Under 40 Award from the Greek America Foundation in New York City.
