= Justice Wilbur =

Justice Wilbur may refer to:

- Curtis D. Wilbur (1867–1954), chief justice of the Supreme Court of California
- George A. Wilbur (1832–1906), associate justice of the Rhode Island Supreme Court
- Lori S. Wilbur (fl. 1970s–2010s), associate justice of the South Dakota Supreme Court

== See also ==
- Isaac Wilbour (1763–1837), associate justice and acting chief justice of the Rhode Island Supreme Court
