= Del Quentin Wilber =

American journalist

- Education: Northwestern University
- Occupation: Journalist
- Relatives: Del Wilber (grandfather); Rick Wilber (uncle)

Del Quentin Wilber is an American journalist who has served as the Washington investigations editor for the Associated Press since November, 2022.

Wilber served as the White House and breaking news editor for the Washington bureau of the Los Angeles Times, after rejoining the paper in August 2018 as an enterprise and investigative reporter focusing on criminal justice and national security matters. He previously covered the Justice Department for The Wall Street Journal, the Los Angeles Times and Bloomberg News. From 2004 through 2014, he worked for The Washington Post, where he wrote extensively about Guantanamo Bay detention camp, former U.S. senator Ted Stevens, the D.C. government, and Iraq War private military company Blackwater Worldwide.

Before that, he was a crime reporter for The Baltimore Sun, where his reporting on wrongdoing by Baltimore Police Department chief Ed Norris led to Norris's 2003 conviction on federal charges and his six-month incarceration. Wilber's work uncovering the scandal earned him the 2004 Al Nakkula Award for excellence in police reporting.

While at The Baltimore Sun, Wilber reported on the D.C Sniper Attacks. His reporting helped the Sun become 2003 Pulitzer Prize for Breaking News Reporting finalists.

Wilber is the author of the best-selling book Rawhide Down: The Near Assassination of Ronald Reagan (March 15, 2011, Henry Holt) about the 1981 attempted assassination of Ronald Reagan. His second book, A Good Month for Murder: The Inside Story of a Homicide Squad, was published in June 2016. Wilber is currently working on his third book, American Spectacle, about the aftermath of the Lindbergh kidnapping.

Wilber is a graduate of The Medill School of Journalism at Northwestern University.
