= Del Wilber =

American baseball player (1919–2002)

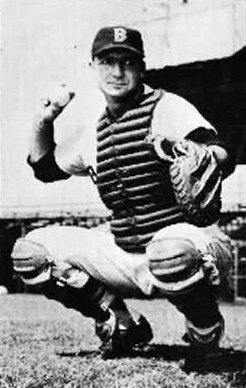
- Catcher
- Born: February 24, 1919; Detroit, Michigan, U.S.
- Died: July 18, 2002 (aged 83); St. Petersburg, Florida, U.S.
- Batted: Right Threw: Right

MLB debut
- April 24, 1946, for the St. Louis Cardinals

Last MLB appearance
- August 19, 1954, for the Boston Red Sox

MLB statistics
- Batting average: .242
- Home runs: 19
- Runs batted in: 115
- Stats at Baseball Reference

Teams
- As player: St. Louis Cardinals (1946–1949); Philadelphia Phillies (1951–1952); Boston Red Sox (1952–1954); As manager: Texas Rangers (1973)

Delbert Quentin Wilber (February 24, 1919 – July 18, 2002) was an American professional baseball player, manager, coach and scout. A catcher, he appeared in 299 Major League games for the St. Louis Cardinals (1946–49), Philadelphia Phillies (1951–52) and Boston Red Sox (1952–54). The native of Lincoln Park, Michigan, threw and batted right-handed. He stood 6 feet 3 inches (1.91 m) tall and weighed 200 pounds (91 kg).

== Catcher with three MLB clubs ==
Wilber signed with the American League St. Louis Browns in 1938, but was acquired by the Cardinals in 1940 and played in their extensive farm system until the outbreak of World War II; he missed the 1942–45 seasons while serving in the United States Army Air Force, where he attained the rank of captain. In 1946, he resumed his baseball career and made his Major League debut, appearing in four games before being sent to the Triple-A Columbus Red Birds. He did not appear in the 1946 World Series.

Wilber played in 51 games for the 1947 Cardinals and 27 more in 1948, but did not spend a full season in MLB again until 1951, when he appeared in 84 games, 61 as the starting catcher, for the Phillies. After only two games played for the 1952 Phillies, Wilber's contract was purchased by the Red Sox on May 12. He served for three seasons as the Red Sox' second-string and third-string receiver behind Sammy White, through 1954. Boston then traded him to the New York Giants for infielder Billy Klaus that December, but the Giants granted Wilber his release to enable him to join the coaching staff of the Chicago White Sox for the 1955 season.

On August 27, 1951, Wilber hit three home runs off pitcher Ken Raffensberger, each on the first pitch of each at bat, to lead the Phillies to a 3–0 victory over the Cincinnati Reds. Two years later, while playing for the Red Sox, Wilber had 27 hits and 29 runs batted in, making him one of the few big leaguers to have more RBIs than hits in a season.

In all or parts of eight MLB seasons, Wilber compiled 720 at bats, 67 runs, 174 hits, 35 doubles, seven triples, 19 homers, 115 RBI, one stolen base and 44 bases on balls. He batted .242 with an on-base percentage of .286, a slugging percentage of .389, 280 total bases and five sacrifice hits.

According to The Sporting News' Official Baseball Register, Wilber had a unique hobby during his catching career. When a pitcher hurled an especially noteworthy game, Wilber would decorate a game baseball, writing the line score of the contest, as well as game highlights, on the ball, then present it to his pitcher.

== Manager, scout and coach ==
Wilber managed in minor league baseball both during his playing career and after it ended. He led the Cardinals' Houston Buffaloes Double-A farm club as a catcher-manager in 1949. Then, after hanging up his catching gear, he managed at the Triple-A level with the Louisville Colonels, Houston Buffs of the American Association, Charleston Senators, Tacoma Twins, Denver Bears and Spokane Indians. He skippered affiliates of the Baltimore Orioles, both the original and expansion editions of the Washington Senators, and the Senators' current incarnations as the Minnesota Twins and Texas Rangers.

His one-game stint as skipper of the 1973 Texas Rangers—as interim pilot between Whitey Herzog and Billy Martin on September 7, he won his only game as manager, 10–8 against the future world champion Oakland Athletics—occurred after Wilber led the Rangers' Spokane affiliate to the 1973 championship of the Pacific Coast League, one of three league titles in his minor-league resume. Wilber was a coach for the 1955–56 White Sox and the 1970 Senators, serving under former teammates Marty Marion and Ted Williams. He also scouted for the Orioles, Twins, Athletics, Cincinnati Reds and Detroit Tigers. He died in St. Petersburg, Florida at the age of 83.

Wilber's son, Rick, is a writer, editor, and teacher. His two other sons, Del Wilber Jr. (Philadelphia Phillies) and Bob Wilber (Detroit Tigers and Oakland A's) both played professional minor league baseball. Bob Wilber then followed in his father's footsteps as a scout (Toronto Blue Jays) after his playing days. After his baseball career, Bob Wilber worked in international sports marketing, was chief executive (GM) of three different professional indoor soccer franchises (St. Louis Storm, Kansas City Attack, and Indianapolis Twisters). He also spent 20 years in professional drag racing as a PR rep and manager for Nitro Funny Car driver Del Worsham (12 years) and Nitro Funny Car driver Tim Wilkerson (8 years.) He is now an author with multiple best-selling books to his credit. Del Wilber's grandson Del Quentin Wilber is a journalist and also a best-selling author.

Sporting positions
Preceded by Johnny Keane; Rube Walker	Houston Buffaloes manager 1949; 1959	Succeeded by Kemp Wicker; Enos Slaughter
Preceded by L. D. Meyer	Louisville Colonels manager 1958	Succeeded by Ben Geraghty
Preceded by Bill Adair	Charleston Senators manager 1960	Succeeded by Franchise disbanded
Preceded by Dick Gernert	Denver Bears manager 1971–1972	Succeeded by Jimmy Williams
Preceded by Franchise re-established	Spokane Indians manager 1973–1975	Succeeded by Frank Howard
Preceded by Cal Ermer	Tacoma Twins manager 1977	Succeeded by Tom Kelly
