= Carthage Township, Hancock County, Illinois =

Carthage Township
- Township
- Township garage in Carthage

- Location in Hancock County

- Hancock County's location in Illinois
- Coordinates: 40°24′54″N 91°05′23″W
- Country: United States
- State: Illinois
- County: Hancock
- Established: November 6, 1849

Area
  - Total: 40.30 sq mi (104.4 km^{2})
  - Land: 40.21 sq mi (104.1 km^{2})
  - Water: 0.08 sq mi (0.21 km^{2}) 0.20%
- Elevation: 643 ft (196 m)

Population (2020)
  - Total: 2,947
  - Density: 73.29/sq mi (28.30/km^{2})
- Time zone: UTC-6 (CST)
  - Summer (DST): UTC-5 (CDT)
- ZIP code: 62321
- FIPS code: 17-067-11540

Carthage Township is one of twenty-four townships in Hancock County, Illinois, USA. As of the 2020 census, its population was 2,947 and it contained 1,466 housing units.

== History ==
Carthage Township was one of the original 19 townships of Hancock County. It took its name from Carthage, the county seat.

As originally drawn, the township covered all of Town 5 North Range 6 West of the fourth principal meridian, as well as the north half of the survey township to the south and the east half of the survey township to the west. In 1854, those half-townships were taken away to form Harmony and Prairie townships, leaving Carthage Township as a single survey township. This had the effect of placing the western part of Carthage city in Prairie Township, which required those who lived there to travel to Elvaston for township business. In 1874, residents successfully petitioned the county to redraw the boundary between the two townships so that this area was returned to Carthage Township.

== Geography ==
According to the 2021 census gazetteer files, Carthage Township has a total area of 40.30 square miles (104.38 km^{2}), of which 40.21 square miles (104.14 km^{2}) (or 99.80%) is land and 0.08 square miles (0.21 km^{2}) (or 0.20%) is water.

=== Cities, towns, villages ===
- Carthage

=== Unincorporated towns ===
- Middle Creek at 40.3728219°N 91.0273601°W

(This list is based on USGS data and may include former settlements.)

=== Cemeteries ===
The township contains these seven cemeteries: Barnes, County Farm, Franklin, Moss Ridge, Old Brick, Old Carthage and Woodring.

=== Major highways ===
- U.S. Route 136
- Illinois Route 336
- Illinois Route 94

=== Airports and landing strips ===
- Memorial Hospital Heliport

=== Landmarks ===
- Jaycee Park

== Demographics ==
Historical population
Census	Pop.	Note	%±
1860	1,679		—
1870	2,448		45.8%
1880	2,679		9.4%
1890	2,536		−5.3%
1900	2,908		14.7%
1910	3,111		7.0%
1920	2,767		−11.1%
1930	2,903		4.9%
1940	3,232		11.3%
1950	3,771		16.7%
1960	3,813		1.1%
1970	3,890		2.0%
1980	3,495		−10.2%
1990	3,122		−10.7%
2000	3,175		1.7%
2010	3,052		−3.9%
2020	2,947		−3.4%
U.S. Decennial Census

As of the 2020 census there were 2,947 people, 1,318 households, and 829 families residing in the township. The population density was 73.14 inhabitants per square mile (28.24/km^{2}). There were 1,466 housing units at an average density of 36.38 units per square mile (14.05 units/km^{2}). The racial makeup of the township was 92.20% White, 0.07% African American, 0.37% Native American, 0.51% Asian, 0.03% Pacific Islander, 1.53% from other races, and 5.29% from two or more races. Hispanic or Latino of any race were 4.07% of the population.

There were 1,318 households, out of which 19.70% had children under the age of 18 living with them, 55.39% were married couples living together, 5.54% had a female householder with no spouse present, and 37.10% were non-families. 33.40% of all households were made up of individuals, and 19.00% had someone living alone who was 65 years of age or older. The average household size was 2.13 and the average family size was 2.71.

The township's age distribution consisted of 18.4% under the age of 18, 5.7% from 18 to 24, 26.9% from 25 to 44, 22.7% from 45 to 64, and 26.3% who were 65 years of age or older. The median age was 44.3 years. For every 100 females, there were 99.2 males. For every 100 females age 18 and over, there were 95.9 males.

The median income for a household in the township was $71,375, and the median income for a family was $91,140. Males had a median income of $50,192 versus $33,661 for females. The per capita income for the township was $37,051. About 6.6% of families and 10.8% of the population were below the poverty line, including 26.1% of those under age 18 and 3.7% of those age 65 or over.

== School districts ==
- Southeastern Community Unit School District 337

== Political districts ==
- Illinois's 18th congressional district
- State House District 94
- State Senate District 47
