= John Wilbur =

John Wilbur may refer to:

- John Wilbur (Quaker minister) (1774–1856), American Quaker minister and religious thinker
- John Wilbur (American football) (1943–2013), American football offensive lineman
