= Roger Scott (American football) =

American football and baseball coach (born 1956)

Biographical details
- Born: October 14, 1956 (age 70)

Playing career

Football
- 1976–1979: Carthage

Coaching career (HC unless noted)

Football
- 1982–1984: Chicago (assistant)
- 1985–1987: Carthage

Baseball
- 1983–1984: Chicago

Head coaching record
- Overall: 6–21 (football)

Roger Scott (born October 14, 1956) is an American football and baseball coach.

== Playing career ==
Scott played football at Carthage College located in Kenosha, Wisconsin while pursuing his undergraduate degree.

== Coaching career ==
=== University of Chicago ===
Scott was the coach of the baseball team and assistant coach of the football team at the University of Chicago from 1983 until 1985.

=== Carthage ===
Scott next became the head football coach for his alma mater at Carthage. He held that position for three seasons, from 1985 to 1987, compiling a record of 6–21.

== Head coaching record ==
=== Football ===
Year	Team	Overall	Conference	Standing	Bowl/playoffs
Carthage Redmen (College Conference of Illinois and Wisconsin) (1985–1987)
1985	Carthage	1–8	1–7	9th	
1986	Carthage	3–6	3–5	6th	
1987	Carthage	2–7	2–6	T–7th	
Carthage:		6–21	6–18		
Total:		6–21			
