= Carthage, Illinois =

City in the United States

- City
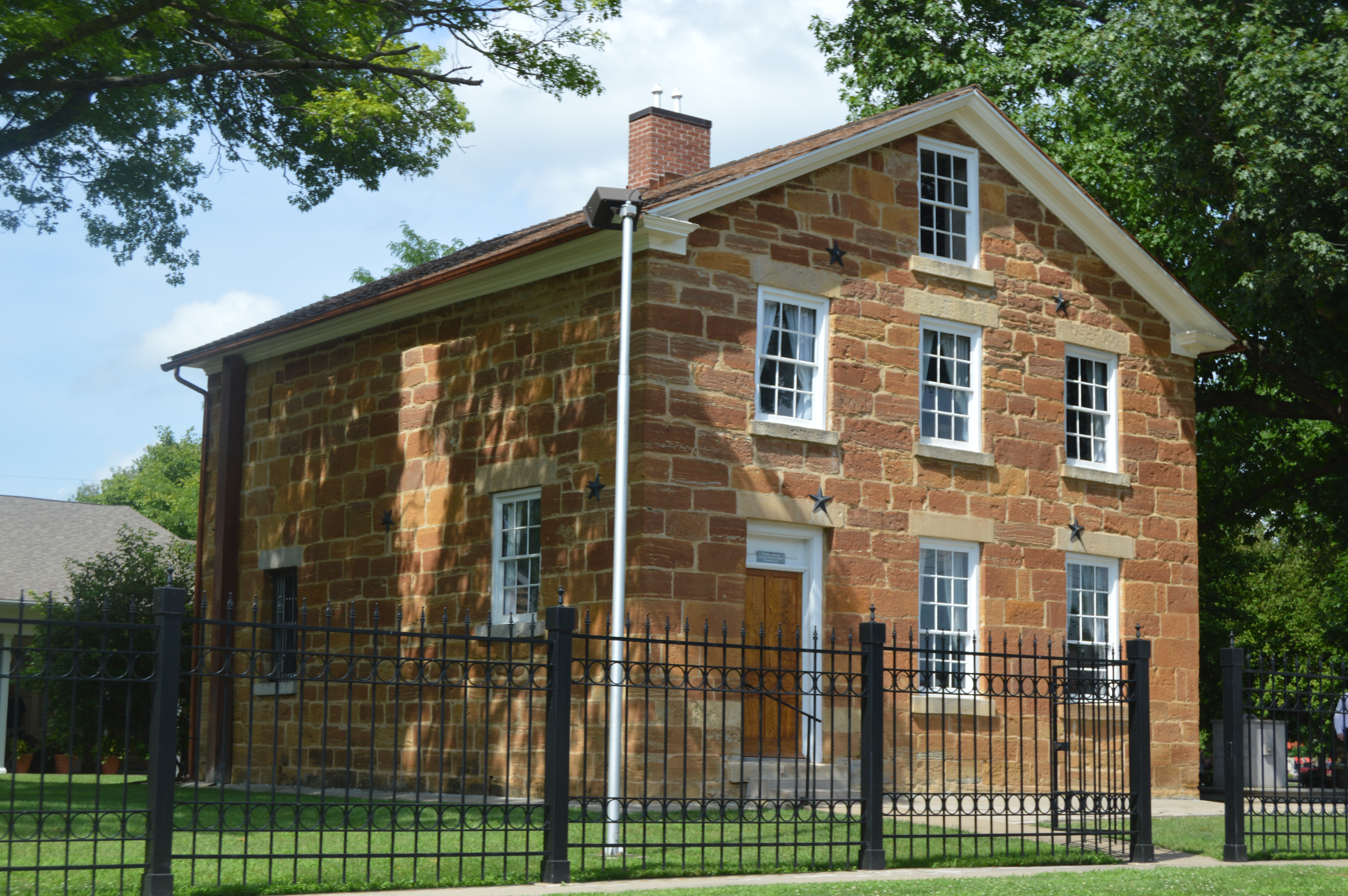
- The historic Carthage Jail, July 2015
- Interactive map of Carthage, Illinois
- Location within Illinois Location within the United States
- Coordinates: 40°24′52″N 91°08′00″W
- Country: United States
- State: Illinois
- County: Hancock
- Township: Carthage
- Founded: 1833
- Incorporated: 1837
- Named for: Carthage

Area
  - Total: 2.49 sq mi (6.46 km^{2})
  - Land: 2.49 sq mi (6.46 km^{2})
  - Water: 0 sq mi (0.00 km^{2})
- Elevation: 656 ft (200 m)

Population (2020)
  - Total: 2,490
  - Estimate (2024): 2,431
  - Density: 997.6/sq mi (385.16/km^{2})
- Time zone: UTC-6 (CST)
  - Summer (DST): UTC-5 (CDT)
- ZIP code: 62321
- Area code(s): 217, 447
- FIPS code: 17-11527
- GNIS feature ID: 2393759
- Website: carthage-il.com

Carthage is a city in and the county seat of Hancock County, Illinois, United States. Its population was 2,490 as of the 2020 census. Carthage is best known for being the site of the 1844 killing of Joseph Smith, who founded the Church of Jesus Christ of Latter-Day Saints.

== History ==
The first European-American settlers arrived in Carthage and in Hancock County in the first few decades of the 19th century. While sharing a name with the ancient city of Carthage, it is likely named more directly for Carthage, Tennessee. By 1833, they had erected simple buildings in Carthage. That year, a log cabin was built to serve as the county courthouse, and the county seat was moved from Montebello to Carthage. The town was platted in 1837.

The only person legally hanged in Hancock County, William Fraim, had been defended in his trial by roaming circuit attorney Abraham Lincoln. Fraim was found guilty of murder following a drunken brawl. Lincoln filed an appeal with the judge in the trial, which was as far as most appeals in those days went. Because Carthage then had no jail, Fraim was kept at the courthouse, which was next to the school. Fraim conversed with the children from his second-floor window. As a result of those conversations, most of the school children were present when their new friend was hanged. The hanging is believed to have taken place near the current city sewer plant east of town, where a natural amphitheater allowed for a crowd to view the spectacle.

While they were incarcerated in the Carthage Jail in June 1844, Joseph Smith, founder of the Church of the Jesus Christ of Latter-Day Saints and his brother Hyrum Smith were killed by a mob on Thursday, June 27, 1844.

On October 22, 1858, Lincoln spoke in Carthage while he was campaigning for the US Senate. A large stone on the south side of the Courthouse Square commemorates the spot.

Over the years, the jail has been modified and used for different purposes. For a while, it was home to Carthage College. The jail has been restored to a close approximation of its appearance in 1844 and is now owned by the Church of Jesus Christ of Latter-day Saints. The site, a full city block, is a historical visitor center open daily.

The regionally-noted botanist, philanthropist, and traveler Dr. Alice L. Kibbe called Carthage home. Along with her personal collections, Carthage's Kibbe Hancock Heritage Museum houses a variety of exhibits celebrating local and regional history.

Carthage is the only city in Illinois to have all of the jails that it has ever used still in existence: the old jail, called the Mormon Jail; the jail next built, which was also the Sheriff's residence, is on the south side of Courthouse Square; and the new jail, which is on Highway 136 in the city's west side.

The Hancock County Courthouse in Carthage was built in 1908 and is the third courthouse for the county. It is at the center of the square in Carthage. The courthouse and the shops surrounding the square have been listed on the National Register of Historic Places since 1986.

== Geography ==
Carthage is located near the center of Hancock County. U.S. Route 136 runs through the center of town as Buchanan Street.

According to the 2010 census, the city has an area of 2.44 square miles (6.3 km^{2}), all land.

In June 2006, development property on the east side of Carthage was voluntarily annexed into the city limits. This property totaled approximately .43 square miles (1.1 km^{2}), all land except for an 8 acres (32,000 m^{2}) lake.

== Demographics ==
Historical population
Census	Pop.	Note	%±
1850	400		—
1870	1,448		—
1880	1,594		10.1%
1890	1,654		3.8%
1900	2,104		27.2%
1910	2,373		12.8%
1920	2,129		−10.3%
1930	2,240		5.2%
1940	2,575		15.0%
1950	3,214		24.8%
1960	3,325		3.5%
1970	3,350		0.8%
1980	2,978		−11.1%
1990	2,657		−10.8%
2000	2,725		2.6%
2010	2,605		−4.4%
2020	2,490		−4.4%
U.S. Decennial Census (Note: The 1850 number is a Census Bureau estimate from non-census sources from 1853 or 1854.)

=== 2020 census ===
As of the 2020 census, Carthage had a population of 2,490. The median age was 43.9 years. 20.6% of residents were under the age of 18 and 24.3% were 65 years of age or older. For every 100 females there were 92.4 males, and for every 100 females age 18 and over there were 87.7 males age 18 and over. There were 694 families residing in the city.

0.0% of residents lived in urban areas, while 100.0% lived in rural areas.

There were 1,087 households in Carthage, of which 23.3% had children under the age of 18 living in them. Of all households, 41.9% were married-couple households, 20.8% were households with a male householder and no spouse or partner present, and 31.3% were households with a female householder and no spouse or partner present. About 40.0% of all households were made up of individuals and 19.3% had someone living alone who was 65 years of age or older.

There were 1,272 housing units, of which 14.5% were vacant. The population density was 997.60 inhabitants per square mile (385.18/km^{2}), and the housing unit density was 509.62 per square mile (196.77/km^{2}). The homeowner vacancy rate was 4.5% and the rental vacancy rate was 13.1%.

Racial composition as of the 2020 census
Race	Number	Percent
White	2,279	91.5%
Black or African American	2	0.1%
American Indian and Alaska Native	10	0.4%
Asian	15	0.6%
Native Hawaiian and Other Pacific Islander	1	0.0%
Some other race	40	1.6%
Two or more races	143	5.7%
Hispanic or Latino (of any race)	109	4.4%

=== Income and poverty ===
The median income for a household in the city was $70,563, and the median income for a family was $90,368. Males had a median income of $50,048 versus $32,279 for females. The per capita income for the city was $36,191. About 7.9% of families and 12.6% of the population were below the poverty line, including 31.6% of those under age 18 and 4.6% of those age 65 or over.

== Economy ==
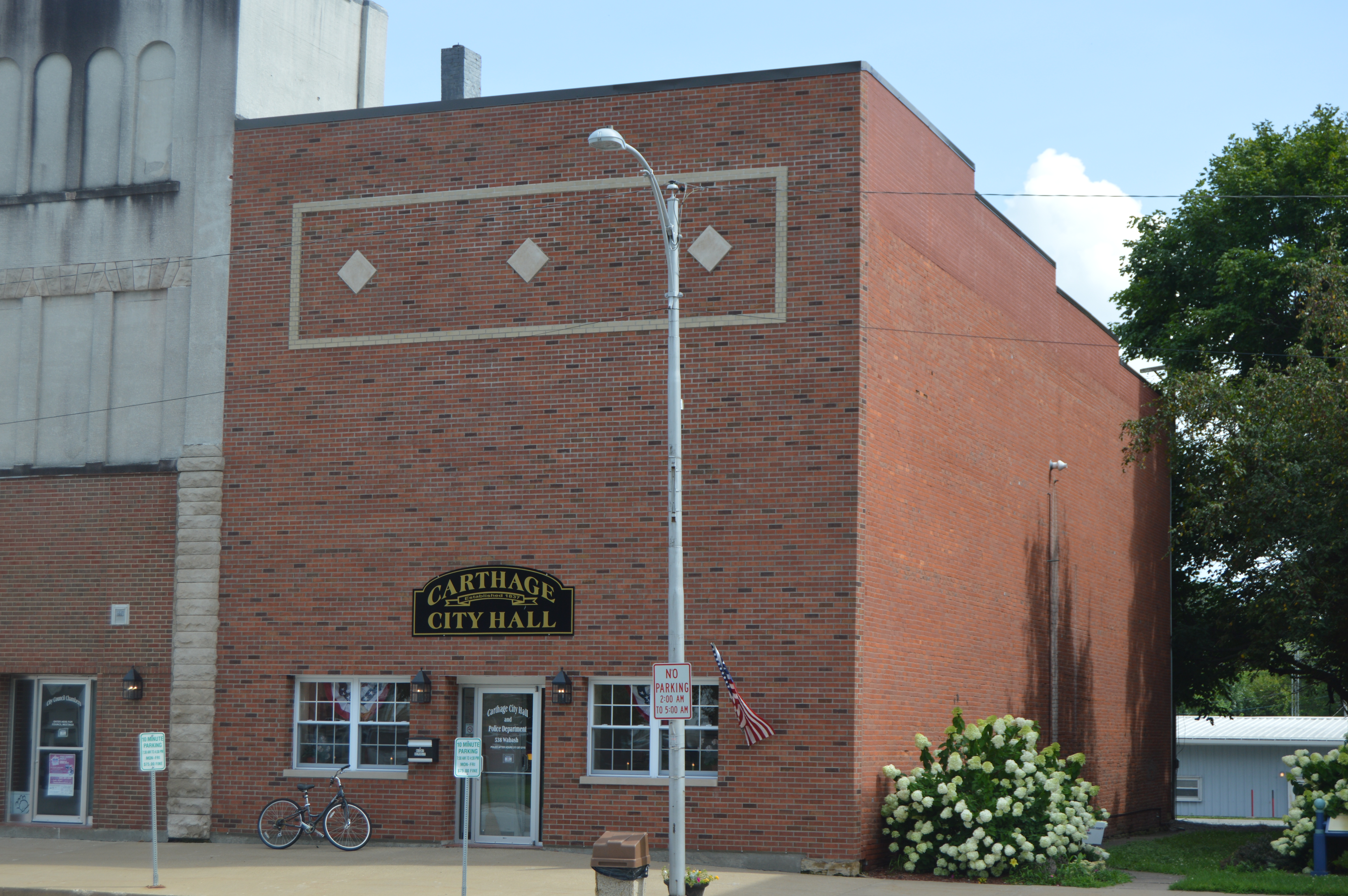
City Hall on the courthouse square, July 2015

Carthage's economy centers upon agriculture and supporting industries. The surrounding land is devoted to the cultivation of crops, especially corn and soybeans. Industrial hog farms are also near the city.

The company Methode Electronics, Inc. operates an auto parts production facility in Carthage, though the company no longer employs as large a portion of the population as was once the case.

== Arts and culture ==
The Legacy Theatre, which was renovated in 2010 and now seats 525 people, hosts many theatrical and musical events each year.

== Education ==
Beginning in August 2007, the Carthage High School (also known as Hancock County Central High School) building became the home of the newly formed Illini West High School, consolidating the high school districts of Carthage, La Harpe, and Dallas City. The three cities maintain separate facilities for elementary and middle schools.

Carl Sandburg College, a two-year community college in Galesburg, has a satellite campus on the north side of Carthage.

From 1870 to 1964, Carthage was home to Carthage College, which relocated to Kenosha, Wisconsin. From 1965 to 1989, Carthage was home to Robert Morris University Illinois, which merged with Moser School of Business and relocated to Chicago.

The former Carthage College campus was purchased by Prairieland Investment Group in June 2007. (Hancock County Journal Pilot June 27, 2007) Some buildings are renovated for use by Carthage Veterinary Clinic. The auditorium was given to Carl Sandburg College, and has been restored for use by the college and for community presentations and events.

== Infrastructure ==
=== Healthcare ===
Memorial Hospital in Carthage opened its doors in 1949, named for the local heroes who brought victory in World War II. Six decades later, Carthage celebrated the grand opening of a new facility in July 2009. The new Memorial Hospital includes 21st Century technology. The hospital operates clinics in the county including Midwest Family Medical Care, Women & Family Medical Group and Convenient Care After-Hours Clinic in Carthage; Bowen Family Practice; Memorial Medical Nauvoo Clinic; and Memorial Medical Clinic in LaHarpe. Additionally, Hancock County Emergency Medical Services is headquartered in Carthage.

== Notable people ==
- Orville F. Berry, Illinois state senator, lawyer, and businessman
- Virginia Cherrill, co-star of Charlie Chaplin in City Lights
- George Clark, college and pro football coach
- Mary Davidson, Illinois state representative and newspaper editor
- Beatrice Gray, actress
- John Nelson Hyde, Presbyterian Missionary in India (Punjab)
- John Mahoney, actor, is buried there
- Leroy A. Ufkes, Illinois state representative and lawyer
- Rip Williams, Major League Baseball player from 1911 to 1918

== See also ==
- List of municipalities in Illinois
