= Carthage College =

Lutheran college in Kenosha, Wisconsin, US

- Former names: The Literary and Theological Institute of the Lutheran Church in the Far West; Lutheran College; Hillsboro College; Illinois State University (1852–1870)
- Motto: Seeking truth. Building strength. Inspiring service. Together.
- Type: Private college
- Established: January 22, 1847; 179 years ago
- Religious affiliation: Evangelical Lutheran Church in America
- Academic affiliations: Space-grant
- Endowment: $163 million (2024)
- President: John R. Swallow
- Academic staff: 150
- Students: 3,036 (fall 2025)
- Undergraduates: 2,873 (fall 2025)
- Postgraduates: 163 (fall 2025)
- Location: Kenosha, Wisconsin, U.S. 42°37′16″N 87°49′18″W
- Campus: 80 acres (32 ha)
- Colors: Red and black
- Nickname: Firebirds
- Sporting affiliations: NCAA Division III – CCIW; CWPA
- Mascot: Ember
- Website: carthage.edu

Carthage College is a private college in Kenosha, Wisconsin, United States. Founded in 1847, it is affiliated with the Evangelical Lutheran Church in America. Carthage awards bachelor's degrees with majors in more than 75 subject areas and master's degrees in four divisions. Carthage has 150 faculty and enrolls approximately 3,000 students. It is the lead institution for the Wisconsin Space Grant Consortium.

== History ==
Carthage College was founded in Hillsboro, Illinois, by Lutheran pioneers in education, and chartered by the Illinois General Assembly on January 22, 1847. Originally known as The Literary and Theological Institute of the Lutheran Church in the Far West, its name was soon shortened to Lutheran College and known locally as Hillsboro College. With a two-person faculty and 79 students, Hillsboro promised "a course of study designed to be thorough and practical, and to embrace all the branches of learning, usually pursued in the best academies and colleges".

In 1852, the college moved to Springfield, Illinois, and was renamed Illinois State University, not to be confused with the institution in Normal, Illinois, under the same name. During this period Abraham Lincoln served briefly on the board of trustees from 1860 to 1861, while his son Robert Todd Lincoln was a student in Illinois State University's preparatory academy from 1853 to 1859. Illinois State University's enrollment dwindled during the Civil War and it closed in 1868. In 1870, several faculty reestablished the college in the rural west-central city of Carthage, Illinois, where the college acquired its current name, Carthage College.

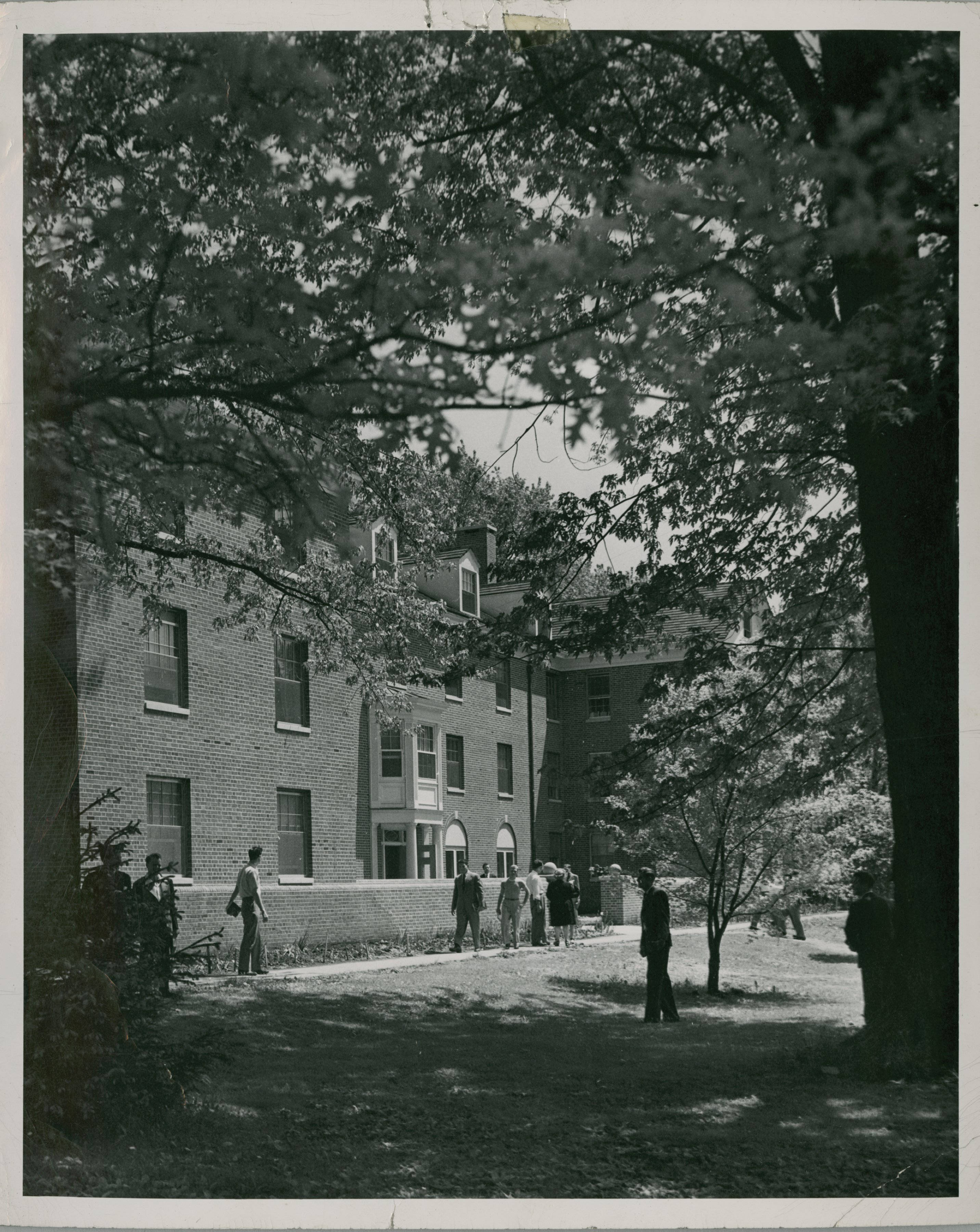
Carthage College in Illinois in the 1930s

The Great Depression and World War II lowered enrollment to 131 students in 1943, but enrollment increased again after the war as a result of the G.I. Bill.

After years of financial challenges, shifts in Lutheran synodical support, and searches for a suitable location, Carthage's board of trustees voted unanimously in 1957 to open a campus in Kenosha, Wisconsin. The lakeshore campus was dedicated on October 14, 1962.

By 1962, the college launched an era of growth. The next decade brought a period of continuous expansion. Enrollment increased fivefold, endowment tripled, and physical assets increased 600 percent. In fall 2025, Carthage enrolled 3,036 students, setting a new record. Since 2001, the college has invested more than $130 million in new construction, major renovations, and technological acquisition.

=== Expansion ===
In 2001, the Hedberg Library opened its doors, adjoining the H. F. Johnson Center for the Fine Arts. The library won Wisconsin Library of the Year in 2004. The library also won the Highsmith Award in 2007 for Family Fun Night, a program for community members that encourages learning for children from 2 to 13. The former Ruthrauff Library was renovated into the A. W. Clausen Center for World Business, opening in 2004.

The Tarble Athletic and Recreation Center opened in 2001, and the former Physical Education Center was rebuilt and renamed the Tarble Arena, opening in 2009.

In fall 2011, a new student union opened on the site of the former W. F. Seidemann Natatorium. It houses a new press box, new bleachers, a new and larger bookstore, new dining options, a campus "living room", a new dining room, a 200-seat theatre, an art gallery, and a gaming area. In April 2012 the student center was formally dedicated and named the Campbell Student Union in honor of retiring President F. Gregory Campbell and his wife, Barbara, for their 25 years of service to Carthage. President Campbell retired in August 2012.

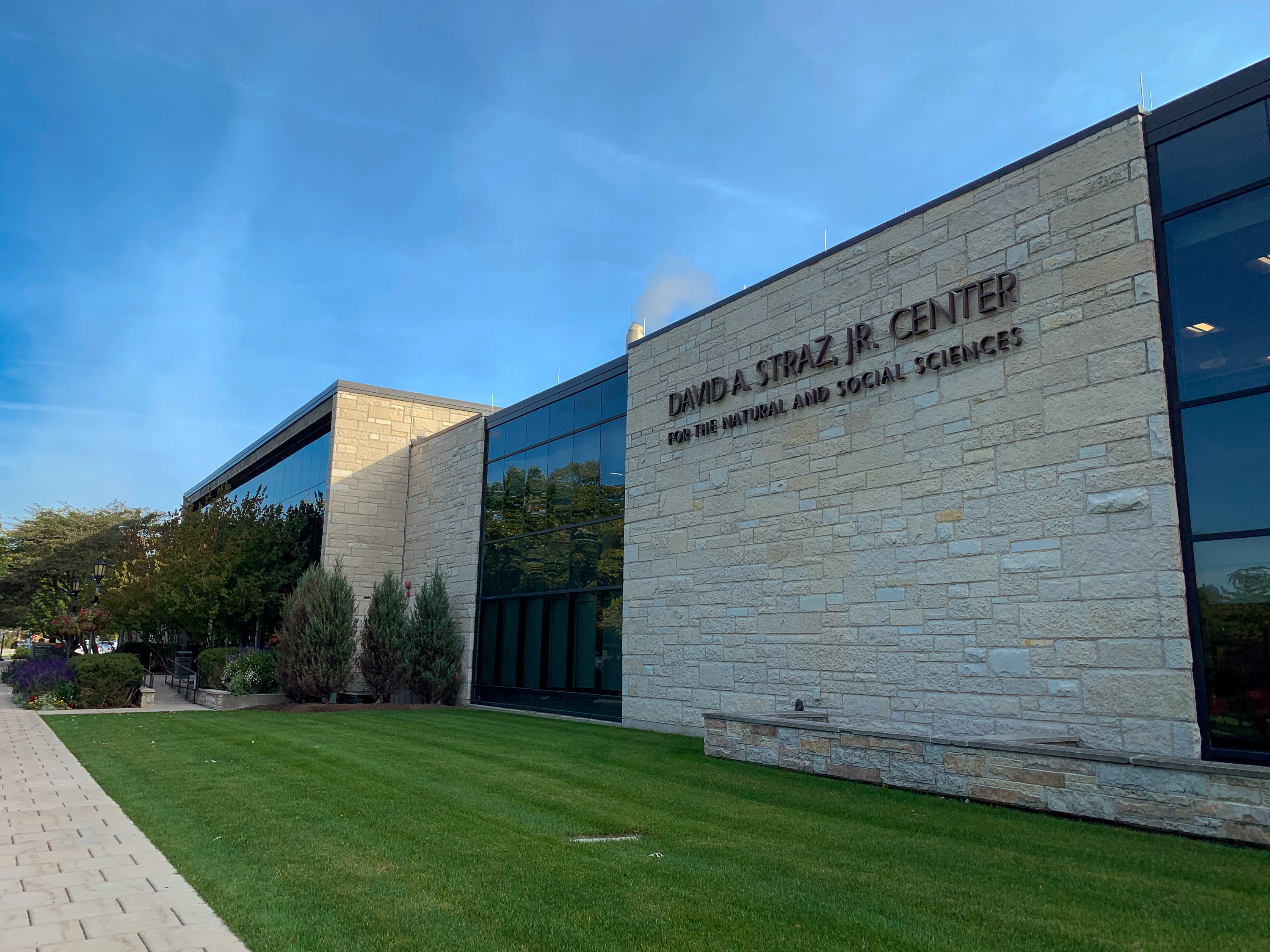
Straz Center

The Oaks, a new student residence village overlooking Lake Michigan, opened in 2012, containing six villas with semi-private suites and a media lounge.

In fall 2015, a new science center opened in the newly renovated David A. Straz Jr. Center for the Natural and Social Sciences. Originally built in 1962, the former Science Hall was renovated and renamed in honor of David A. Straz, Jr., in 1995. The latest $45 million expansion added a new planetarium, twelve new science labs, new classrooms, faculty offices, and student gathering and exhibition spaces.

In fall 2018, the newest residence hall, The Tower, was opened. The Tower provides students with apartment-style suites with personal bathrooms, as well as media lounges on each floor and communal kitchens on every other floor. The building also presented students with the Terrace, a studying space with televisions, laptop bars, and a functioning fireplace.

Renovations to Lentz Hall in subsequent years have added nursing facilities and engineering facilities, and renovations to Hedberg Library in the summer of 2025 added expanded nursing facilities to that building's lower level.

In the summer of 2026, A.F. Siebert Chapel received extensive renovations which replaced the original pews on the ground floor with moveable chairs and covered the original flooring with terrazzo tiling. The Chapel reopened in the fall of that year, with the main hall renamed and rededicated in honor of Grace Kolakowski, whose donations allowed the renovations to happen.

=== Presidents ===
Carthage has had 23 presidents since its founding:

- Francis Springer — 1847–1855
- Simeon W. Harkey — 1855–1857 (1)
- William M. Reynolds — 1858–1862
- Simeon W. Harkey — 1862–1866 (2)
- David Loy Tressler — 1873–1880
- J. A. Kunkelman — 1881–1883
- J. S. Detweiler — 1883–1884
- E.F. Bartholomew — 1884–1888
- Holmes Dysinger — 1888–1895
- John M. Ruthrauff — 1895–1900
- Frederick L. Sigmund — 1900–1909
- Harvey D. Hoover — 1909–1926
- N. J. Gould Wickey — 1926–1929
- Jacob Diehl — 1929–1933
- Rudolph G. Schulz — 1935–1943
- Erland Nelson — 1943–1949
- Morris Wee — 1950–1951
- Ruth Wick — 1951–1952
- Harold H. Lentz — 1952–1976
- Erno J. Dahl — 1977–1986
- Alan R. Anderson — 1986–1987
- F. Gregory Campbell — 1987–2012
- Gregory S. Woodward — 2012–2017
- John R. Swallow — 2017–present

== Academics ==
Carthage offers a Bachelor of Arts in more than 40 areas of study and the Bachelor of Science in Nursing. Carthage also partners with master's level institutions to offer dual-degree programs in engineering, occupational therapy, chiropractic, and pharmacy. Its most popular undergraduate majors, by number out of 585 graduates in 2022, were:

- Registered Nursing/Registered Nurse (59)
- Marketing/Marketing Management (51)
- Business Administration and Management (49)
- Psychology (40)
- Exercise Science and Kinesiology (34)
- Biology/Biological Sciences (31)
- Criminal Justice/Law Enforcement Administration (29)

The college has been accredited by the Higher Learning Commission since 1916. Carthage also offers three master's degree programs in education, business design and innovation, and music theatre vocal pedagogy.

The academic calendar spans two 14-week semesters, separated by a month-long January term. During January Term, known on campus as "J-Term", participating students select one class and attend it daily. In addition to on-campus courses, many students travel with faculty on study tours in either January or the summer months. Destinations in 2016 included Cuba, Nicaragua, and World War II battle sites in Europe. All students must complete two J-Term courses, including one during their freshman year.

All students must complete a senior thesis. This capstone project can take the form of a research project, music recital, art exhibit, or some other original demonstration of scholarship or creativity. All Carthage students were required to take Western Heritage, a year-long course sequence in which they read, discussed, and wrote about major Western texts. The reading list included works by Plato, Homer, Shakespeare, Thomas Jefferson, and W. E. B. DuBois, in addition to the Bible. In the 2020–2021 school year, this was replaced with Intellectual Foundations, which has the same purpose but includes more texts written by non-white authors.

=== Admissions ===
In fall 2025, Carthage had enrollment of 2,818 undergraduate students and 163 graduate students. The student body is 55 percent female and 45 percent male. 70% of applicants are accepted for admission.

=== Faculty ===
The college has a student-to-faculty ratio of 13 to 1. In fall 2025, the college employed 141 full-time professors and 194 part-time faculty members. In the summer of 2020, the college announced a plan to reduce "total full-time faculty by 10 to 20 percent. That reduction would include a mix of tenured and contract faculty." It is to be effected via a "reorganization" affecting ten departments, including Biology, Classics, English, Modern Languages, Music, Philosophy and Great Ideas, Physics and Astronomy, Political Science, Religion, and Sociology and Criminal Justice. In fall 2021, the college employed 142 full-time professors and 145 part-time faculty members.

=== Tuition ===
Undergraduate tuition for the 2019–2020 academic year was $45,100 (excluding books, personal expenditures, and health insurance). On September 17, 2019, the college announced that it was resetting the sticker price of tuition for the 2020–21 academic year by 30% to $31,500. The college made this decision in an effort to make its pricing more transparent and to attract students that may have been deterred by the high listed tuition.

=== Rankings ===
Carthage College was tied for 37th among Regional Universities Midwest in the 2025 U.S. News & World Report rankings of Best Colleges. The Institute for International Education placed Carthage 4th among baccalaureate institutions for student participation in short-term study abroad in 2013–2014. In The Princeton Review's 2016 rankings, Carthage was among 159 schools listed as a Best Midwestern College.

From 2008 through 2025, 38 students from the college won Fulbright fellowships. In 2016, the college was named a top Fulbright producer.

== Traditions ==
=== The Old Main Bell ===
For decades, the Old Main Bell sat in the tower at the top of Old Main, the first building on the campus in Carthage, Illinois. After athletic victories, students would race down Evergreen Walk to ring the bell. When Carthage moved from Illinois to Wisconsin in the 1960s, the Tau Sigma Chi fraternity helped move the victory bell to Kenosha. In 2004, the victory bell found a new home in the scoreboard on Art Keller Field.

=== Kissing Rock ===
Kissing Rock has been a part of Carthage since 1913. Dennis Swaney and other members of the Class of 1913 found the 2 ½-ton chunk of granite in a farmer's field and moved the stone to the campus. Stationed prominently at the entrance to Evergreen Walk, the rock quickly became part of Carthage life. One tradition recounts that any woman sitting on the rock was obligated to kiss the man who found her there and countless marriage proposals have been made and accepted near it. Members of the Beta Phi Epsilon fraternity moved Kissing Rock to the Kenosha campus in the mid-1960s. It now sits facing Lake Michigan between Lentz and Tarble Halls.

Today, Kissing Rock is a multifaceted symbol of the Carthage spirit. Students paint the Rock to promote their organizations and causes, publicize upcoming events, and celebrate. Kissing Rock has served as a memorial to former students, an expression of protest against injustice, a tribute after 9/11, and more.

=== Christmas Festival ===
The Christmas Festival has been a part of Carthage's holiday season since 1974. Every year at the start of December, Carthage hosts a musical celebration of the birth of Christ for the community. The event highlights student vocal and instrumental ensembles, as well as performances by students in Carthage's Theatre Department.

== Athletics ==
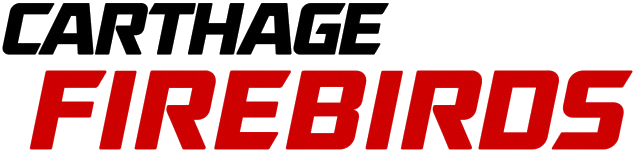

Men's sports	Women's sports
Baseball	Basketball
Basketball	Bowling
Cross Country	Cross country
Football	Golf
Golf	Lacrosse
Lacrosse	Soccer
Soccer	Softball
Swimming and Diving	Swimming and diving
Tennis	Tennis
Track and field	Track and field
Volleyball	Volleyball
Wrestling	Water polo
	Wrestling

Carthage is a member of the Division III level of the National Collegiate Athletic Association (NCAA), primarily competing in the College Conference of Illinois and Wisconsin (CCIW) since the 1961–62 academic year; which they were a member on a previous stint from 1946–47 to 1951–52. The Firebirds previously competed in the Illinois Intercollegiate Athletic Conference from 1912–13 to 1940–41.

Carthage's original team nicknames were the "Redmen" and "Lady Reds". In 2005, the NCAA ruled that Carthage, along with several other colleges, would be ineligible to host NCAA-sanctioned playoffs and tournaments because the "Redmen" nickname was perceived as an offensive reference to Native Americans. A decision was made to rename the Carthage men's teams the "Red Men". This is in accordance with the circa 1920 origin of the name—the team's red uniform jersey—while removing any possible controversial connotations. In conjunction with the rearticulation of the name, a new logo for the team replaced the traditional feathered Carthage C. It includes a torch, a shield, and a C. In 2020–21, the Red Men and Lady Reds names were retired and Carthage officially adopted the Firebirds as its new team name; the new mascot, Ember the Firebird, was revealed during the Homecoming festivities in the fall of 2021.

In men's volleyball, Carthage became a founding member of the single-sport Continental Volleyball Conference (CVC) in 2011. In 2014, the CVC amicably split along regional lines, with Carthage and the CVC's other Midwestern members forming the Midwest Collegiate Volleyball League. The team then moved into the CCIW once the conference began sponsoring men's volleyball in 2020.

In women's water polo, Carthage is a member of the single-sport Collegiate Water Polo Association Division III Conference since the team's inception in 2010. In the spring of 2021, Carthage announced the creation of an e-sports team as a varsity sport.

Over a third of Carthage students are involved in varsity intercollegiate athletics, and another third participate in the many intramural and club sports offered. Club sports include men's bowling, and co-ed curling and ice hockey.

=== Baseball ===
The men's baseball team averaged over 35 wins per season from 1990 to 2010, with an overall record of 702–237. They have been invited to the NCAA Division III World Series several times, finishing third in 2009.

Since 1990, Carthage has claimed eight outright CCIW divisional titles, one divisional-title tie, nine conference crowns, 16 NCAA regional berths, including nine-straight from 1992 to 2000, six regional titles, third-place finishes in both the 1993 and 1994 NCAA Division III baseball championships and fourth place in both 1995 and 1997. For his efforts, Coach Augie Schmidt has been named American Baseball Coaches Association/Diamond Sports NCAA Division III Central Regional "Coach Of The Year" nine times (1992, 1993, 1994, 1995, 1997, 2002, 2003, 2007 and 2009), won the ABCA/Louisville Slugger Conference Award seven times from 1993 to 1999, and has been named CCIW "Baseball Coach of the Year" on 10 occasions (1989, 1990, 1992, 1993, 1995, 1999, 2002, 2003, 2007 and 2009).

=== Football ===
See List of Carthage Firebirds head football coaches

In 2004, Carthage's football team set a school record for most wins in a season, going 11–2. That season was also the first time the Red Men made the NCAA Division III playoffs since the school joined the NCAA in 1976. The team was coached by Tim Rucks. Carthage went on to win their first two games of the playoffs defeating Alma College and Wooster College. The Red Men then lost to Mount Union College. The Red Men finished the 2004 season ranked 5th in the nation.

Mike Yeager served as the head coach beginning with the 2012 season and concluding in 2017. Dustin Hass took over the role in 2018, followed by Matt Popino in 2024.

In 2020, the Carthage Board of Trustees and Athletics voted unanimously to retire the Red Men/Lady Reds nickname and mascot "Torchie" from athletics. The teams will compete as Carthage Athletics for the 2020–2021 academic year with a new name and mascot approved and announced prior to the 2021–2022 academic year. On February 19, 2021, the Carthage Board of Trustees, along with President Swallow, voted to change the nickname to the Firebirds, and the new nickname was immediately adopted for all sports. At the Homecoming Football Game in October 2021, the Carthage team unveiled their new mascot, named "Ember".

=== Volleyball ===
The men's volleyball team went undefeated in the 2021 spring season and went on to win the school's first Division III National Championship. They repeated as champions in 2022, becoming the first sport to win back-to-back national championships at the college. They have been invited on several occasions, finishing 2nd in their very first year. In 2022 they were the hosts of the Division III Final Four, winning the National Championship on their home court.

== Notable alumni ==
- George A. Anderson – U.S. Representative from Illinois
- J. Arthur Baird – athlete and coach
- Alden W. Clausen – former President of the World Bank
- Caroline Bartlett Crane – American Unitarian minister, suffragist, civic reformer, educator and journalist
- Tony D'Souza – novelist
- Scott C. Fergus – Wisconsin State Representative
- Daniel L. Gard – U.S. Navy admiral
- Steve Hanson – NFL player for the Louisville Colonels and Kansas City Blues/Cowboys
- John Hay - journalist, White House senior aide, and U.S. Secretary of State
- David Holliday – Broadway, film, and television actor
- Alie "Muffy" Israel – track and field sprinter
- James L. Jelinek, 8th Episcopal Bishop of Minnesota
- Jim Jodat – NFL player for the Los Angeles Rams, Seattle Seahawks, and San Diego Chargers
- Susan Lee Johnson – historian and professor
- William George Juergens – United States federal judge
- Laura Kaeppeler – 2012 Miss America Winner
- Rick Kehr – NFL player for the Washington Redskins
- Jon Kukla – author and historian
- Scott M. Ladd – Iowa Supreme Court justice
- David J. Lepak – Wisconsin State Representative
- Paul Miller – MLB player
- Vivian Onano – African activist and social entrepreneur from Kenya
- Fernando Sanford – founding faculty member and physics professor at Stanford University
- Marie Sarantakis – author
- Ross H. Trower – Chief of Chaplains of the U.S. Navy
- Adam Walker – NFL player for the Minnesota Vikings
- A. Gilbert Wright – zoologist

== Notable faculty ==
- Thomas Carr, paleontologist
- Alice L. Kibbe, biologist
- Perry Kivolowitz, computer science
- Augie Schmidt, baseball head coach
