= List of Michigan State Spartans football seasons =

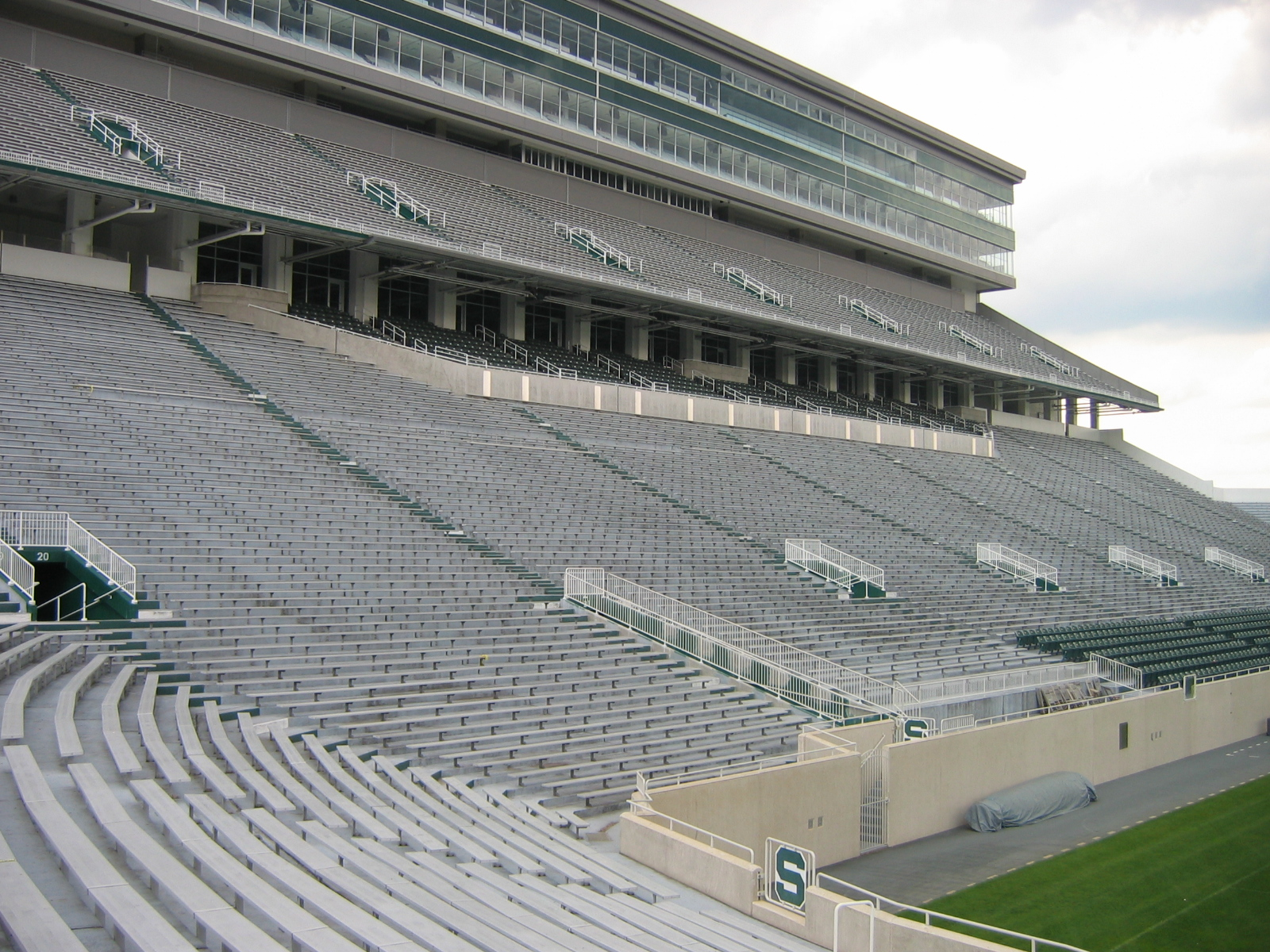
Spartan Stadium, where the Spartans have played since 1923.

This is a list of seasons completed by the Michigan State Spartans football team of the National Collegiate Athletic Association (NCAA) Division I Football Bowl Subdivision (FBS). Since the team's creation in 1885, the Spartans have participated in more than 1,200 officially sanctioned games, including 30 bowl games.

Michigan State originally competed as a football independent. In 1896, MSU joined the Michigan Intercollegiate Athletic Association. The Spartans then competed independently again from 1907 through 1952. In 1953, MSU joined the Big Ten conference, where it has been a member ever since.

== Seasons ==
Year	Coach	Overall	Conference	Standing	Bowl/playoffs	Coaches^{#}	AP^{°}
No coach (MIAA) (1896)
1896	No coach	1–2–1	0–1				
Henry Keep (MIAA) (1897–1898)
1897	Henry Keep	4–2–1	1–1–1				
1898	Henry Keep	4–3	4–1				
Charles O. Bemies (MIAA) (1899–1900)
1899	Charles O. Bemies	2–4–1	1–2–1				
1900	Charles O. Bemies	1–4	1–3				
George Denman (MIAA) (1901–1902)
1901	George Denman	3–4–1	3–2–1				
1902	George Denman	4–5	2–2				
Chester Brewer (MIAA) (1903–1906)
1903	Chester Brewer	6–1–1	4–0–1	T–1st			
1904	Chester Brewer	8–1	4–1				
1905	Chester Brewer	9–2	5–0	1st			
1906	Chester Brewer	7–2–2	6–1–1				
1907	Chester Brewer	4–2–1	1–0–1	1st			
Chester Brewer (Independent) (1908–1910)
1908	Chester Brewer	6–0–2					
1909	Chester Brewer	8–1					
1910	Chester Brewer	6–1					
John Macklin (Independent) (1911–1915)
1911	John Macklin	5–1					
1912	John Macklin	7–1					
1913	John Macklin	7–0					
1914	John Macklin	5–2					
1915	John Macklin	5–1					
Frank Sommers (Independent) (1916)
1916	Frank Sommers	4–2–1					
Chester Brewer (Independent) (1917)
1917	Chester Brewer	0–9					
George Gauthier (Independent) (1918)
1918	George Gauthier	4–3					
Chester Brewer (Independent) (1919)
1919	Chester Brewer	4–4–1					
George Clark (Independent) (1920)
1920	George Clark	4–6					
Albert Barron (Independent) (1921–1922)
1921	Albert Barron	3–5					
1922	Albert Barron	3–5–2					
Ralph H. Young (Independent) (1923–1927)
1923	Ralph H. Young	3–5					
1924	Ralph H. Young	5–3					
1925	Ralph H. Young	3–5					
1926	Ralph H. Young	3–4–1					
1927	Ralph H. Young	4–5					
Harry Kipke (Independent) (1928)
1928	Harry Kipke	3–4–1					
Jim Crowley (Independent) (1929–1932)
1929	Jim Crowley	5–3					
1930	Jim Crowley	5–1–2					
1931	Jim Crowley	5–3–1					
1932	Jim Crowley	7–1					
Charlie Bachman (Independent) (1933–1946)
1933	Charlie Bachman	4–2–2					
1934	Charlie Bachman	8–1					
1935	Charlie Bachman	6–2					
1936	Charlie Bachman	6–1–2					
1937	Charlie Bachman	8–2			L Orange		
1938	Charlie Bachman	6–3					
1939	Charlie Bachman	4–4–1					
1940	Charlie Bachman	3–4–1					
1941	Charlie Bachman	5–3–1					
1942	Charlie Bachman	4–3–2					
1943	No team						
1944	Charlie Bachman	6–1					
1945	Charlie Bachman	5–3–1					
1946	Charlie Bachman	5–5					
Biggie Munn (Independent) (1947–1952)
1947	Biggie Munn	7–2					
1948	Biggie Munn	6–2–2					14
1949	Biggie Munn	6–3					19
1950	Biggie Munn	8–1				8	8
1951	Biggie Munn	9–0				2	2
1952	Biggie Munn	9–0				1	1
Biggie Munn (Big Ten) (1953)
1953	Biggie Munn	9–1	5–1	T–1st	W Rose	3	3
Duffy Daugherty (Big Ten) (1954–1972)
1954	Duffy Daugherty	3–6	1–5	T–8th			
1955	Duffy Daugherty	9–1	5–1	2nd	W Rose	2	2
1956	Duffy Daugherty	7–2	4–2	T–4th		10	9
1957	Duffy Daugherty	8–1	5–1	2nd		3	3
1958	Duffy Daugherty	3–5–1	0–5–1	10th			
1959	Duffy Daugherty	5–4	4–2	2nd		16	
1960	Duffy Daugherty	6–2–1	4–2	4th		13	15
1961	Duffy Daugherty	7–2	5–2	3rd		9	8
1962	Duffy Daugherty	5–4	3–3	T–5th			
1963	Duffy Daugherty	6–2–1	4–1–1	T–2nd		10	9
1964	Duffy Daugherty	4–5	3–3	6th			
1965	Duffy Daugherty	10–1	7–0	1st	L Rose	1	2
1966	Duffy Daugherty	9–0–1	7–0	1st		2	2
1967	Duffy Daugherty	3–7	3–4	T–5th			
1968	Duffy Daugherty	5–5	2–5	7th			
1969	Duffy Daugherty	4–6	2–5	9th			
1970	Duffy Daugherty	4–6	3–4	T–5th			
1971	Duffy Daugherty	6–5	5–3	T–3rd			
1972	Duffy Daugherty	5–5–1	5–2–1	4th			
Denny Stolz (Big Ten) (1973–1975)
1973	Denny Stolz	5–6	4–4	T–4th			
1974	Denny Stolz	7–3–1	6–1–1	3rd		18	12
1975	Denny Stolz	7–4	4–4	T–3rd			
Darryl Rogers (Big Ten) (1976–1979)
1976	Darryl Rogers	4–6–1	3–5	T–7th			
1977	Darryl Rogers	7–3–1	6–1–1	3rd			
1978	Darryl Rogers	8–3	7–1	T–1st			12
1979	Darryl Rogers	5–6	3–5	T–7th			
Muddy Waters (Big Ten) (1980–1982)
1980	Muddy Waters	3–8	2–6	9th			
1981	Muddy Waters	5–6	4–5	T–6th			
1982	Muddy Waters	2–9	2–7	T–8th			
George Perles (Big Ten) (1983–1994)
1983	George Perles	4–6–1	2–6–1	7th			
1984	George Perles	6–6	5–4	T–6th	L Cherry		
1985	George Perles	7–5	5–3	T–4th	L Hall of Fame Classic		
1986	George Perles	6–5	4–4	T–5th			
1987	George Perles	9–2–1	7–0–1	1st	W Rose	8	8
1988	George Perles	6–5–1	6–1–1	2nd	L Gator		
1989	George Perles	8–4	6–2	T–3rd	W Aloha	16	16
1990	George Perles	8–3–1	6–2	T–1st	W John Hancock	14	16
1991	George Perles	3–8	3–5	T–6th			
1992	George Perles	5–6	5–3	3rd			
1993	George Perles	6–6	4–4	7th	L Liberty		
1994	George Perles	5–6 (Note: Michigan State later forfeited all wins due to academic scandal.)	4–4	T–4th			
Nick Saban (Big Ten) (1995–1999)
1995	Nick Saban	6–5–1	4–3–1	5th	L Independence		
1996	Nick Saban	6–6	5–3	T–5th	L Sun		
1997	Nick Saban	7–5	4–4	T–6th	L Aloha		
1998	Nick Saban	6–6	4–4	6th			
1999	Nick Saban (Note: During the bowl game, the Spartans were coached by interim head coach Bobby Williams.)	10–2	6–2	T–2nd	W Citrus	7	7
Bobby Williams (Big Ten) (2000–2002)
2000	Bobby Williams	5–6	2–6	T–9th			
2001	Bobby Williams	7–5	3–5	T–8th	W Silicon Valley Classic		
2002	Bobby Williams (Note: This was the third and final season for head coach Bobby Williams, who was replaced after the Michigan game by interim head coach Morris Watts.)	4–8	2–6	T–8th			
John L. Smith (Big Ten) (2003–2006)
2003	John L. Smith	8–5	5–3	T–4th	L Alamo		
2004	John L. Smith	5–7	4–4	T–5th			
2005	John L. Smith	5–6	2–6	9th			
2006	John L. Smith	4–8	1–7	T–10th			
Mark Dantonio (Big Ten) (2007–2019)
2007	Mark Dantonio	7–6	3–5	T–7th	L Champs Sports		
2008	Mark Dantonio	9–4	6–2	3rd	L Capital One	24	24
2009	Mark Dantonio	6–7	4–4	T–6th	L Alamo		
2010	Mark Dantonio (Note: Dantonio suffered a heart attack for which he was hospitalized, and received a coronary stent. While he recovered, offensive coordinator Don Treadwell stepped in as acting head coach, leading the Spartans against Northern Colorado and Wisconsin.)	11–2	7–1	T–1st	L Capital One	14	14
2011	Mark Dantonio	11–3	7–1	1st (Legends)	W Outback	10	11
2012	Mark Dantonio	7–6	3–5	4th (Legends)	W Buffalo Wild Wings		
2013	Mark Dantonio	13–1	8–0	1st (Legends)	W Rose^{†}	3	3
2014	Mark Dantonio	11–2	7–1	2nd (East)	W Cotton^{†}	5	5
2015	Mark Dantonio	12–2	7–1	T–1st (East)	L Cotton^{†} (CFP Semifinal)	6	6
2016	Mark Dantonio	3–9	1–8	6th (East)			
2017	Mark Dantonio	10–3	7–2	T–2nd (East)	W Holiday	16	15
2018	Mark Dantonio	7–6	5–4	4th (East)	L Redbox		
2019	Mark Dantonio	7–6	4–5	5th (East)	W Pinstripe		
Mel Tucker (Big Ten) (2020–2023)
2020	Mel Tucker	2–5	2–5	7th (East)			
2021	Mel Tucker	11–2	7–2	3rd (East)	W Peach^{†}	8	9
2022	Mel Tucker	0–7 (Note: Michigan State vacated all 14 of its victories from the 2022–24 seasons.)	0–6	5th (East)			
2023	Mel Tucker (Note: Following the Richmond game, Mel Tucker was suspended without pay on September 10 and was fired for cause on September 27. Harlon Barnett served as interim head coach for the last 10 games of the season.)	0–8	0–7	6th (East)			
Jonathan Smith (Big Ten) (2024–2025)
2024	Jonathan Smith	0–7	0–6	T–12th			
2025	Jonathan Smith	4–8	1–8	T–16th			
Total:		725–502–44					
National championship Conference title Conference division title or championship game berth
^{†}Indicates Bowl Coalition, Bowl Alliance, BCS, or CFP / New Years' Six bowl.; ^{#}Rankings from final Coaches Poll.
