= 1901 in Michigan =

- Decades: 1880s; 1890s; 1900s; 1910s; 1920s
- See also: History of Michigan; Historical outline of Michigan; List of years in Michigan; 1901 in the United States

Events from the year 1901 in Michigan.

== Office holders ==
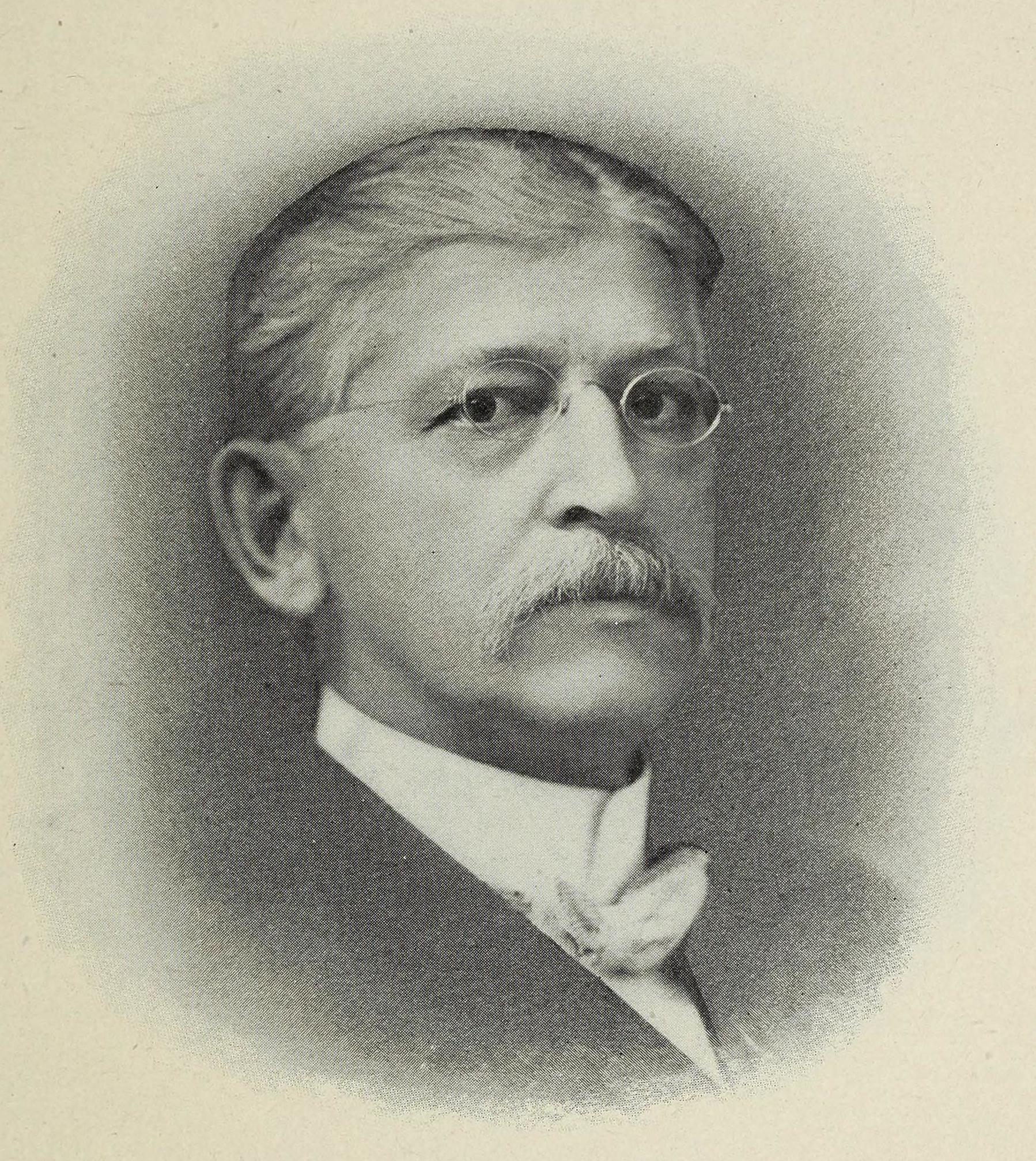
Gov. Aaron Bliss

=== State office holders ===
- Governor of Michigan: Hazen S. Pingree/Aaron T. Bliss (Republican)
- Lieutenant Governor of Michigan: Orrin W. Robinson (Republican)
- Michigan Attorney General: Horace M. Oren
- Michigan Secretary of State: Fred M. Warner (Republican)
- State Land Commissioner: Edwin A. Wildey (Republican)
- Speaker of the Michigan House of Representatives: John J. Carton (Republican)
- Chief Justice, Michigan Supreme Court: Robert Morris Montgomery

=== Mayors of major cities ===
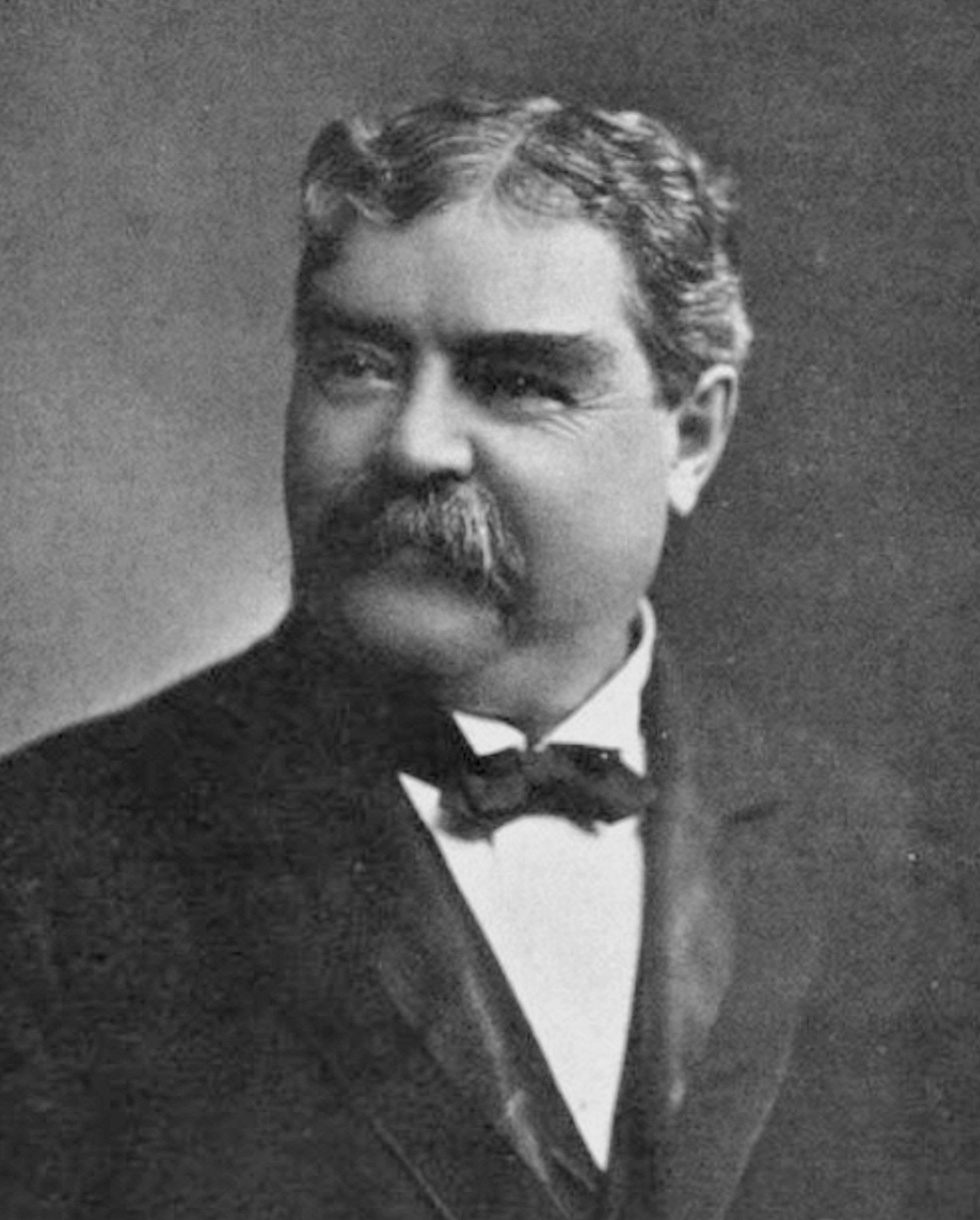
Mayor Wm. Maybury

- Mayor of Detroit: William C. Maybury (Democrat)
- Mayor of Grand Rapids: George R. Perry
- Mayor of Flint: Charles A. Cummings/Clark B. Dibble
- Mayor of Ann Arbor: Gottlob Luick/Royal S. Copeland
- Mayor of Lansing: Benjamin A. Kyes
- Mayor of Saginaw: William B. Baum

=== Federal office holders ===
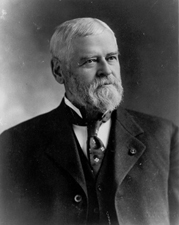
Sen. Julius Burrows

- U.S. Senator from Michigan: Julius C. Burrows (Republican)
- U.S. Senator from Michigan: James McMillan (Republican)
- House District 1: John Blaisdell Corliss (Republican)
- House District 2: Henry C. Smith (Republican)
- House District 3: Washington Gardner (Republican)
- House District 4: Edward L. Hamilton (Republican)
- House District 5: William Alden Smith (Republican)
- House District 6: Samuel William Smith (Republican)
- House District 7: Edgar Weeks (Republican)
- House District 8: Joseph W. Fordney (Republican)
- House District 9: Roswell P. Bishop (Republican)
- House District 10: Rousseau Owen Crump (Republican)/Henry H. Aplin (Republican)
- House District 11: William S. Mesick (Republican)/Archibald B. Darragh (Republican)
- House District 12: Carlos D. Shelden (Republican)

== Population ==
In the 1900 United States census, Michigan was recorded as having a population of 2,420,982, ranking as the ninth most populous state in the country. By 1910, Michigan's population had increased by 16.1% to 2,810,173 .

=== Cities ===
The following is a list of cities in Michigan with a population of at least 10,000 based on 1900 U.S. census data. Historic census data from 1890 and 1910 is included to reflect trends in population increases or decreases. In recent decades, all of the state's most populous cities lie in the southern half of the lower peninsula. In 1900, owing largely to an economy based on extraction of natural resources, five of the state's largest cities were located north of 44° latitude; in the chart below, these cities are shaded in aqua.

1900 Rank	City	County	1890 Pop.	1900 Pop.	1910 Pop.	Change 1900-10
1	Detroit	Wayne	205,876	285,704	465,766	63.0%
2	Grand Rapids	Kent	60,278	87,565	112,571	28.6%
3	Saginaw	Saginaw	46,322	42,345	50,510	19.3%
4	Bay City	Bay	27,839	27,628	45,166	63.5%
5	Jackson	Jackson	20,798	25,180	31,433	24.8%
6	Kalamazoo	Kalamazoo	17,853	24,404	39,437	61.6%
7	Muskegon	Muskegon	22,702	20,818	24,062	15.6%
8	Port Huron	St. Clair	13,543	19,158	18,863	−1.5%
9	Battle Creek	Calhoun	13,197	18,563	25,267	36.1%
10	Lansing	Ingham	13,102	16,485	31,229	89.4%
11	Ann Arbor	Washtenaw	9,431	14,509	14,817	2.1%
12	Manistee	Manistee	12,812	14,260	12,381	−13.2%
13	Flint	Genesee	9,803	13,103	38,550	194.2%
14	Menominee	Menominee	10,630	12,818	10,507	−18.0%
15	Alpena	Alpena	6,153	11,283	11,802	4.6%
16	Sault Ste. Marie	Chippewa	5,760	10,538	12,615	19.7%
17	Marquette	Marquette	9,098	10,058	11,503	14.4%

=== Counties ===
The following is a list of counties in Michigan with populations of at least 40,000 based on 1900 U.S. census data. Historic census data from 1890 and 1910 are included to reflect trends in population increases or decreases.

1900 Rank	County	Largest city	1890 Pop.	1900 Pop.	1910 Pop.	Change 1900-10
1	Wayne	Detroit	257,114	348,793	531,591	52.4%
2	Kent	Grand Rapids	109,922	129,714	159,145	22.7%
3	Saginaw	Saginaw	82,273	81,222	89,290	9.9%
4	Houghton	Houghton	35,389	66,063	88,098	33.4%
5	Bay	Bay City	56,412	62,378	68,238	9.4%
6	St. Clair	Port Huron	52,105	55,228	52,341	−5.2%
7	Calhoun	Battle Creek	43,501	49,315	56,638	14.8%
8	Berrien	Niles	41,285	49,165	53,622	9.1%
9	Lenawee	Adrian	48,448	48,406	47,907	−1.0%
10	Jackson	Jackson	45,031	48,222	53,426	10.8%
11	Washtenaw	Ann Arbor	42,210	47,761	44,714	−6.4%
12	Oakland	Pontiac	41,245	44,792	49,576	10.7%
13	Kalamazoo	Kalamazoo	39,273	44,310	60,327	36.1%
14	Genesee	Flint	39,430	41,804	64,555	54.4%
15	Marquette	Marquette	39,521	41,239	46,739	13.3%
16	Ottawa	Holland	35,358	39,667	45,301	14.2%

== Sports ==
=== Baseball ===
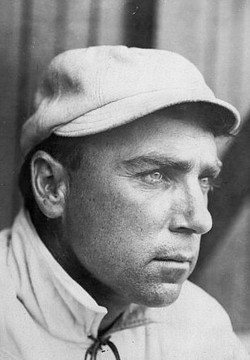
Jimmy Barrett

- 1901 Detroit Tigers season – The Tigers finished in third place in the inaugural season of the American League with a record of 74–61. Roscoe Miller (23–13) became the Tigers' first 20-game winner. The team's best hitters were shortstop Kid Elberfeld (.308 average) and center fielder Jimmy Barrett (.293 average; 110 runs).
- 1901 Michigan Wolverines baseball season – Under head coach Frank Sexton, the Wolverines compiled a 13–8 record (8–2 in conference) and won the Western Conference championship. Edwin McGinnis was the team captain.

=== American football ===
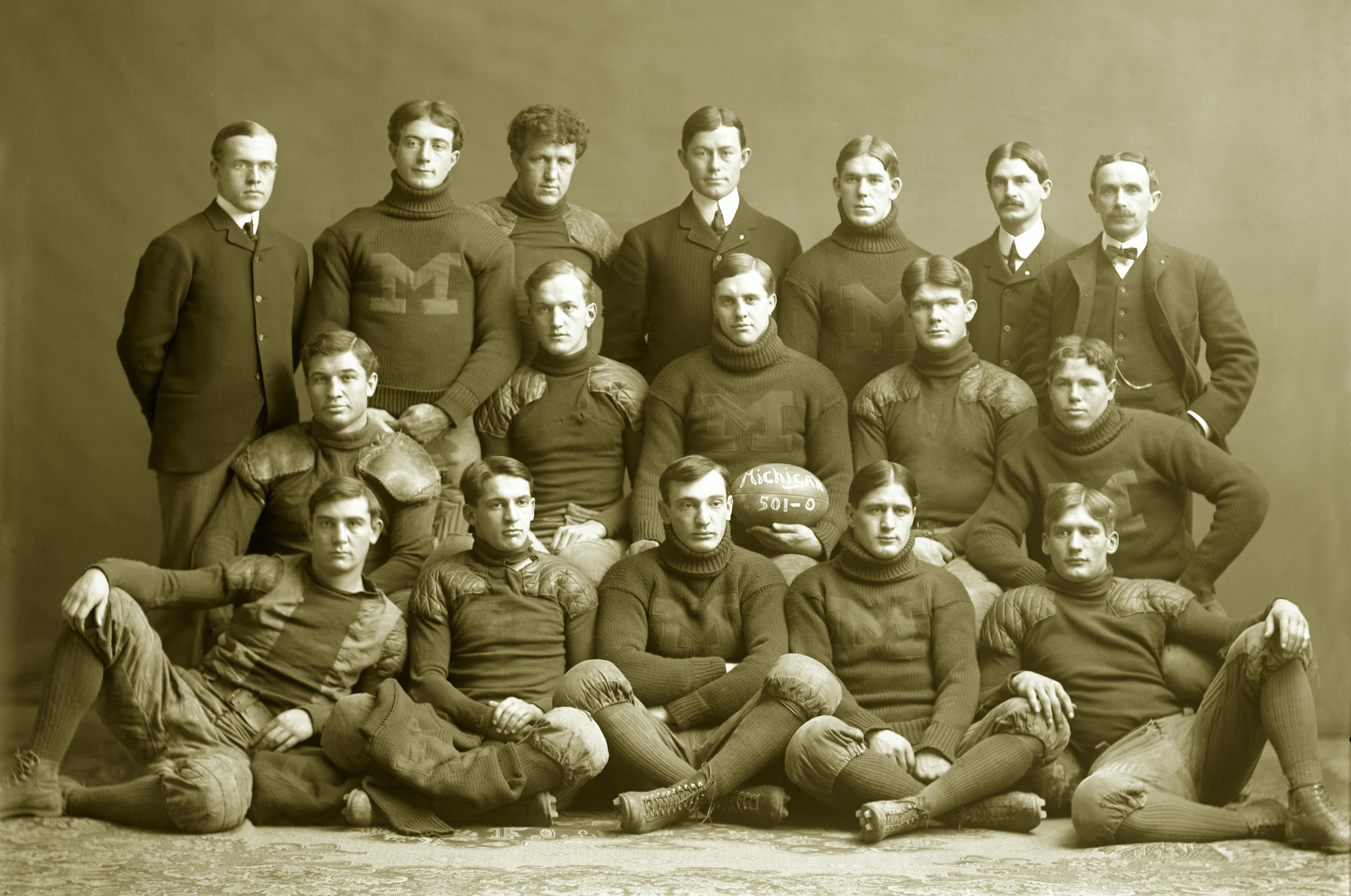
1901 Michigan football team

- 1901 Michigan Wolverines football team – In their first year under head coach Fielding H. Yost, the team compiled a perfect 11–0 record, outscored its opponents by a combined total of 550 to 0, and defeated Stanford by a 49 to 0 score in the inaugural Rose Bowl game.
- 1901 Michigan Agricultural Aggies football team – Under head coach George Denman, the Aggies compiled a 3–4–1 record and outscored their opponents 120 to 94.
- 1901 Michigan State Normal Normalites football team – Under head coach Clayton Teetzel, the Normalites compiled a record of 3–5 and were outscored by a combined total of 167 to 58. Phillip E. Dennis was the team captain.
- 1901 Detroit Titans football team – Under head coach John C. Mackey, the team compiled a 3–3 record and outscored its opponents by a combined total of 66 to 58.

== Chronology of events ==
- January 1 – Aaron T. Bliss, a Republican from Saginaw, was sworn in as Governor of Michigan in a ceremony in Lansing.
- May 1 – U.S. Representative Rousseau Owen Crump, who represented Michigan's 10th congressional district, died in office.
- October 15 – Henry H. Aplin is seated to fill the vacancy left in the United States House of Representatives by Rousseau Owen Crump's death.

== Births ==
- March 3 – Gwen Wakeling, Academy Award-winning costume designer, in Detroit
- March 25 – Evo Anton DeConcini, Attorney General of Arizona, and a Justice of the Arizona Supreme Court, in Iron Mountain, Michigan
- May 28 – Paul G. Goebel, All-American football end and Mayor of Grand Rapids, in Grand Rapids
- August 15 – Les Sweetland, Major League Baseball pitcher from 1927 to 1931, in St. Ignace, Michigan
- August 15 – Jack Fleischman, American football lineman, in Monroe, Michigan
- October 10 – John R. Emens, President of Ball State University from 1945 to 1968, in Prattville, Michigan
- November 13 – Werner Emmanuel Bachmann, chemist and pioneer in steroid synthesis, in Detroit
- Date unknown – Leonard Peter Schultz, ichthyologist and expert on shark attacks, in Albion, Michigan
- Date unknown – Nell Scott, first woman to serve in Alaska Territorial Legislature, in Marengo, Michigan
- Date unknown – Forman Brown, leader in puppet theater and early gay novelist, in Otsego, Michigan
- Date unknown – Douglas V. Steere, professor of philosophy and Quaker ecumenist, in Harbor Beach, Michigan

== Deaths ==
- March 11 – Charles T. Gorham, one of the founders of the Republican party, an anti-slavery activist, a division commander in the Michigan Militia, United States Ambassador to the Netherlands, Assistant Secretary of the Interior, at age 89 in Marshall, Michigan
- March 18 – Mark S. Brewer, former U.S. Congressman and Civil Service Commissioner, at age 64 in Washington, D.C.
- March 26 – George Willard, former U.S. Congressman who was instrumental in opening the University of Michigan to women, in Battle Creek, Michigan
- May 1 – Rousseau Owen Crump, U.S. Representatives (1895–1901), died in office at age 57 in West Bay City
- June 18 – Hazen S. Pingree, former mayor of Detroit and Governor of Michigan, while traveling in London, England
- August 13 – Sanford M. Green, Michigan Supreme Court Justice (1848–1857), at age 94
- October 29 – Leon Czolgosz, assassin of Pres. William McKinley and a native of Alpena, Michigan, in electric chair

== See also ==
- History of Michigan
- History of Detroit
