= List of Michigan Intercollegiate Athletic Association football standings =

This is a list of yearly Michigan Intercollegiate Athletic Association football standings.

== MIAA standings ==
1894 Michigan Intercollegiate Athletic Association football standings
| | Conf. | | | | | Overall |
| Team | W | | L | | T | W | | L | | T |
|---|---|---|---|---|---|---|---|---|---|---|
| Albion $ | 3 | – | 0 | – | 0 | 5 | – | 1 | – | 1 |
| Hillsdale | 1 | – | 2 | – | 0 | 3 | – | 3 | – | 0 |
| Olivet | 1 | – | 2 | – | 0 | 1 | – | 3 | – | 0 |
| Michigan State Normal | 0 | – | 1 | – | 0 | 5 | – | 2 | – | 0 |
$ – Conference champion

1903 Michigan Intercollegiate Athletic Association football standings
| | Conf. | | | | | Overall |
| Team | W | | L | | T | W | | L | | T |
|---|---|---|---|---|---|---|---|---|---|---|
| Michigan Agricultural + | 4 | – | 1 | – | 0 | 6 | – | 1 | – | 1 |
| Albion | 3 | – | 2 | – | 1 | 3 | – | 3 | – | 2 |
+ – Conference co-champions

1905 Michigan Intercollegiate Athletic Association football standings
| | Conf. | | | | | Overall |
| Team | W | | L | | T | W | | L | | T |
|---|---|---|---|---|---|---|---|---|---|---|
| Michigan Agricultural $ | 5 | – | 0 | – | 0 | 9 | – | 2 | – | 0 |
| Albion | 4 | – | 1 | – | 0 | 5 | – | 2 | – | 0 |
| Olivet | 3 | – | 3 | – | 0 | 4 | – | 4 | – | 0 |
| Kalamazoo | 3 | – | 3 | – | 0 | 3 | – | 6 | – | 0 |
| Alma | 1 | – | 4 | – | 0 | 5 | – | 4 | – | 0 |
| Hillsdale | 0 | – | 5 | – | 0 | 4 | – | 5 | – | 0 |
$ – Conference champion

1921 Michigan Intercollegiate Athletic Association football standings
| | Conf. | | | | | Overall |
| Team | W | | L | | T | W | | L | | T |
|---|---|---|---|---|---|---|---|---|---|---|
| Kalamazoo $ | 3 | – | 0 | – | 0 | 7 | – | 2 | – | 0 |
| Albion | 4 | – | 1 | – | 0 | 6 | – | 2 | – | 0 |
| Hillsdale | 2 | – | 2 | – | 0 | 5 | – | 3 | – | 0 |
| Michigan State Normal | 1 | – | 2 | – | 0 | 3 | – | 3 | – | 0 |
| Olivet | 1 | – | 3 | – | 0 | 2 | – | 5 | – | 1 |
| Alma | 1 | – | 4 | – | 0 | 2 | – | 6 | – | 1 |
$ – Conference champion

1934 Michigan Intercollegiate Athletic Association football standings
| | Conf. | | | | | Overall |
| Team | W | | L | | T | W | | L | | T |
|---|---|---|---|---|---|---|---|---|---|---|
| Kalamazoo + | 2 | – | 1 | – | 1 | 3 | – | 3 | – | 1 |
| Hope + | 2 | – | 1 | – | 1 | 3 | – | 2 | – | 1 |
| Alma | 1 | – | 1 | – | 2 | 1 | – | 4 | – | 2 |
| Albion | 1 | – | 2 | – | 1 | 3 | – | 4 | – | 1 |
| Hillsdale | 1 | – | 2 | – | 1 | 2 | – | 5 | – | 1 |
$ – Conference champion

2005 Michigan Intercollegiate Athletic Association football standings
| | Conf. | | | Overall |
| Team | W | | L | W | | L |
|---|---|---|---|---|---|---|
| Albion $^ | 6 | – | 1 | 7 | – | 4 |
| Adrian | 5 | – | 2 | 8 | – | 2 |
| Hope | 5 | – | 2 | 5 | – | 5 |
| Alma | 4 | – | 3 | 6 | – | 4 |
| Olivet | 4 | – | 3 | 5 | – | 5 |
| Kalamazoo | 3 | – | 4 | 4 | – | 6 |
| Wisconsin Lutheran | 1 | – | 6 | 1 | – | 9 |
| Tri-State * | 0 | – | 7 | 0 | – | 10 |
$ – Conference champion; ^ – NCAA Division III playoff participant; * – Provisional NCAA Division III member

2006 Michigan Intercollegiate Athletic Association football standings
| | Conf. | | | Overall |
| Team | W | | L | W | | L |
|---|---|---|---|---|---|---|
| Hope $^ | 7 | – | 0 | 7 | – | 4 |
| Alma | 5 | – | 2 | 6 | – | 4 |
| Olivet | 5 | – | 2 | 6 | – | 4 |
| Adrian | 4 | – | 3 | 5 | – | 5 |
| Albion | 3 | – | 4 | 5 | – | 5 |
| Kalamazoo | 2 | – | 5 | 2 | – | 7 |
| Tri-State # | 2 | – | 5 | 2 | – | 8 |
| Wisconsin Lutheran | 0 | – | 7 | 0 | – | 10 |
$ – Conference champion; ^ – NCAA Division III playoff participant; * – Provisional NCAA Division III member

2007 Michigan Intercollegiate Athletic Association football standings
| | Conf. | | | Overall |
| Team | W | | L | W | | L |
|---|---|---|---|---|---|---|
| Hope + | 6 | – | 1 | 6 | – | 4 |
| Olivet +^ | 6 | – | 1 | 6 | – | 5 |
| Alma | 5 | – | 2 | 5 | – | 5 |
| Adrian | 4 | – | 3 | 7 | – | 3 |
| Tri-State | 4 | – | 3 | 6 | – | 4 |
| Albion | 2 | – | 5 | 2 | – | 8 |
| Wisconsin Lutheran | 1 | – | 6 | 1 | – | 9 |
| Kalamazoo | 0 | – | 7 | 1 | – | 8 |
+ – Conference co-champions; ^ – NCAA Division III playoff participant

2008 Michigan Intercollegiate Athletic Association football standings
| | Conf. | | | Overall |
| Team | W | | L | W | | L |
|---|---|---|---|---|---|---|
| No. 20 Trine $^ | 6 | – | 0 | 10 | – | 1 |
| Adrian | 5 | – | 1 | 8 | – | 2 |
| Alma | 3 | – | 3 | 5 | – | 5 |
| Albion | 3 | – | 3 | 4 | – | 6 |
| Hope | 3 | – | 3 | 3 | – | 7 |
| Kalamazoo | 1 | – | 5 | 2 | – | 8 |
| Olivet | 0 | – | 6 | 1 | – | 9 |
$ – Conference champion; ^ – NCAA Division III playoff participant; Rankings from D3football.com

2009 Michigan Intercollegiate Athletic Association football standings
| | Conf. | | | Overall |
| Team | W | | L | W | | L |
|---|---|---|---|---|---|---|
| No. 17 Trine $^ | 6 | – | 0 | 10 | – | 2 |
| Adrian | 4 | – | 2 | 6 | – | 4 |
| Albion | 4 | – | 2 | 4 | – | 6 |
| Alma | 3 | – | 3 | 5 | – | 5 |
| Hope | 3 | – | 3 | 3 | – | 7 |
| Kalamazoo | 1 | – | 5 | 4 | – | 6 |
| Olivet | 0 | – | 6 | 0 | – | 10 |
$ – Conference champion; ^ – NCAA Division III playoff participant; Rankings from D3football.com

2010 Michigan Intercollegiate Athletic Association football standings
| | Conf. | | | Overall |
| Team | W | | L | W | | L |
|---|---|---|---|---|---|---|
| No. 10 Trine $^ | 6 | – | 0 | 11 | – | 1 |
| Adrian | 4 | – | 2 | 5 | – | 5 |
| Albion | 4 | – | 2 | 5 | – | 5 |
| Hope | 3 | – | 3 | 3 | – | 7 |
| Alma | 2 | – | 4 | 3 | – | 7 |
| Kalamazoo | 2 | – | 4 | 3 | – | 7 |
| Olivet | 0 | – | 6 | 0 | – | 10 |
$ – Conference champion; ^ – NCAA Division III playoff participant; Rankings from D3football.com

2011 Michigan Intercollegiate Athletic Association football standings
| | Conf. | | | Overall |
| Team | W | | L | W | | L |
|---|---|---|---|---|---|---|
| Albion $^ | 6 | – | 0 | 6 | – | 5 |
| Hope | 5 | – | 1 | 7 | – | 3 |
| Adrian | 4 | – | 2 | 8 | – | 2 |
| Trine | 3 | – | 3 | 7 | – | 3 |
| Kalamazoo | 1 | – | 5 | 4 | – | 6 |
| Alma | 1 | – | 5 | 2 | – | 8 |
| Olivet | 1 | – | 5 | 1 | – | 9 |
$ – Conference champion; ^ – NCAA Division III playoff participant

2012 Michigan Intercollegiate Athletic Association football standings
| | Conf. | | | Overall |
| Team | W | | L | W | | L |
|---|---|---|---|---|---|---|
| Adrian $^ | 6 | – | 0 | 9 | – | 2 |
| Trine | 5 | – | 1 | 7 | – | 3 |
| Hope | 4 | – | 2 | 5 | – | 5 |
| Albion | 3 | – | 3 | 6 | – | 4 |
| Kalamazoo | 2 | – | 4 | 5 | – | 5 |
| Alma | 1 | – | 5 | 1 | – | 9 |
| Olivet | 0 | – | 6 | 0 | – | 10 |
$ – Conference champion; ^ – NCAA Division III playoff participant

2013 Michigan Intercollegiate Athletic Association football standings
| | Conf. | | | Overall |
| Team | W | | L | W | | L |
|---|---|---|---|---|---|---|
| Albion $^ | 6 | – | 0 | 8 | – | 3 |
| Hope | 4 | – | 2 | 7 | – | 3 |
| Kalamazoo | 4 | – | 2 | 6 | – | 4 |
| Adrian | 3 | – | 3 | 6 | – | 4 |
| Olivet | 2 | – | 4 | 6 | – | 4 |
| Trine | 1 | – | 5 | 4 | – | 6 |
| Alma | 1 | – | 5 | 1 | – | 9 |
$ – Conference champion; ^ – NCAA Division III playoff participant

2014 Michigan Intercollegiate Athletic Association football standings
| | Conf. | | | Overall |
| Team | W | | L | W | | L |
|---|---|---|---|---|---|---|
| Adrian $^ | 5 | – | 1 | 8 | – | 3 |
| Albion | 4 | – | 2 | 6 | – | 4 |
| Trine | 4 | – | 2 | 6 | – | 4 |
| Hope | 3 | – | 3 | 6 | – | 4 |
| Olivet | 3 | – | 3 | 6 | – | 4 |
| Kalamazoo | 2 | – | 4 | 2 | – | 8 |
| Alma | 0 | – | 6 | 2 | – | 8 |
$ – Conference champion; ^ – NCAA Division III playoff participant

2015 Michigan Intercollegiate Athletic Association football standings
| | Conf. | | | Overall |
| Team | W | | L | W | | L |
|---|---|---|---|---|---|---|
| Olivet + | 5 | – | 1 | 9 | – | 1 |
| Albion +^ | 5 | – | 1 | 9 | – | 2 |
| Adrian | 4 | – | 2 | 7 | – | 3 |
| Trine | 4 | – | 2 | 6 | – | 4 |
| Alma | 2 | – | 4 | 5 | – | 5 |
| Kalamazoo | 1 | – | 5 | 3 | – | 7 |
| Hope | 0 | – | 6 | 2 | – | 8 |
+ – Conference co-champions; ^ – NCAA Division III playoff participant

2016 Michigan Intercollegiate Athletic Association football standings
| | Conf. | | | Overall |
| Team | W | | L | W | | L |
|---|---|---|---|---|---|---|
| Olivet $^ | 6 | – | 0 | 9 | – | 2 |
| Hope | 5 | – | 1 | 7 | – | 3 |
| Alma | 4 | – | 2 | 7 | – | 3 |
| Trine | 3 | – | 3 | 6 | – | 4 |
| Adrian | 2 | – | 4 | 4 | – | 6 |
| Kalamazoo | 1 | – | 5 | 3 | – | 7 |
| Albion | 0 | – | 6 | 1 | – | 9 |
$ – Conference champion; ^ – NCAA Division III playoff participant

2017 Michigan Intercollegiate Athletic Association football standings
| | Conf. | | | Overall |
| Team | W | | L | W | | L |
|---|---|---|---|---|---|---|
| No. 19 Trine $^ | 6 | – | 0 | 11 | – | 1 |
| Hope | 5 | – | 1 | 8 | – | 2 |
| Adrian | 4 | – | 2 | 5 | – | 5 |
| Olivet | 3 | – | 3 | 5 | – | 5 |
| Albion | 2 | – | 4 | 4 | – | 6 |
| Alma | 1 | – | 5 | 4 | – | 6 |
| Kalamazoo | 0 | – | 6 | 1 | – | 9 |
$ – Conference champion; ^ – NCAA Division III playoff participant; Rankings from D3football.com

2018 Michigan Intercollegiate Athletic Association football standings
| | Conf. | | | Overall |
| Team | W | | L | W | | L |
|---|---|---|---|---|---|---|
| No. 24 Trine $^ | 7 | – | 0 | 10 | – | 1 |
| Hope | 6 | – | 1 | 8 | – | 2 |
| Albion | 4 | – | 3 | 7 | – | 3 |
| Kalamazoo | 4 | – | 3 | 7 | – | 3 |
| Olivet | 4 | – | 3 | 6 | – | 4 |
| Adrian | 2 | – | 5 | 4 | – | 6 |
| Alma | 1 | – | 6 | 2 | – | 8 |
| Finlandia | 0 | – | 7 | 0 | – | 10 |
$ – Conference champion; ^ – NCAA Division III playoff participant; Rankings from D3football.com

2019 Michigan Intercollegiate Athletic Association football standings
| | Conf. | | | Overall |
| Team | W | | L | W | | L |
|---|---|---|---|---|---|---|
| Hope $^ | 7 | – | 0 | 9 | – | 2 |
| Albion | 5 | – | 2 | 8 | – | 2 |
| Olivet | 5 | – | 2 | 8 | – | 2 |
| Alma | 4 | – | 3 | 6 | – | 4 |
| Adrian | 4 | – | 3 | 5 | – | 5 |
| Trine | 2 | – | 5 | 5 | – | 5 |
| Kalamazoo | 1 | – | 6 | 2 | – | 8 |
| Finlandia | 0 | – | 7 | 0 | – | 10 |
$ – Conference champion; ^ – NCAA Division III playoff participant
