= 1904 Michigan Agricultural Aggies football team =

American college football season

1904 Michigan Agricultural Aggies football
- Conference: Michigan Intercollegiate Athletic Association
- Record: 8–1 (4–1 MIAA)
- Head coach: Chester Brewer (2nd season)
- Captain: Robert F. Bell
- Home stadium: College Field

The 1904 Michigan Agricultural Aggies football team represented Michigan Agricultural College (MAC)—now known as Michigan State University—as a member of the Michigan Intercollegiate Athletic Association (MIAA) during the 1904 college football season. In their second year under head coach Chester Brewer, the Aggies compiled an overall record of 8–1 with a mark of 4–1 in conference play, and outscored opponents 380 to 16, including a 104 to 0 victory over Hillsdale.

== Schedule ==
Date	Opponent	Site	Result	Source
October 1	Michigan School for the Deaf*	College Field; East Lansing, MI	W 47–0	
October 8	Ohio Northern*	College Field; East Lansing, MI	W 28–6	
October 15	Port Huron YMCA*	College Field; East Lansing, MI	W 29–0	
October 22	at Albion	Winter-Lau Field; Albion, MI	L 0–4	
October 29	Hillsdale	College Field; East Lansing, MI	W 104–0	
November 5	Michigan freshmen*	College Field; East Lansing, MI	W 39–0	
November 12	at Olivet	Olivet, MI	W 35–6	
November 19	at Alma	Alma, MI	W 40–0	
November 24	Kalamazoo	College Field; East Lansing, MI	W 58–0	
*Non-conference game
