= 1899–1900 Michigan State Spartans men's basketball team =

American college basketball season

1899–1900 Michigan State Spartans men's basketball
- Conference: Independent
- Record: 2–4
- Head coach: Charles Bemies
- Home arena: Armory

The 1899–1900 Michigan State Spartans men's basketball team represented Michigan State University for the 1899–1900 college men's basketball season. The head coach was Charles Bemies coaching the team is first season.

== Schedule ==
Date time, TV	Opponent	Result	Record	Site city, state
1/20/1900*	at Olivet	L 05–06	0–1	Olivet, MI
1/27/1900*	Governor's Guard	L 03–06	0–2	Armory; East Lansing, MI
2/3/1900*	Olivet	L 06–08	0–3	Armory; East Lansing, MI
3/3/1900*	Eastern Michigan	W 25–08	1–3	Armory; East Lansing, MI
3/10/1900*	at Governor's Guard	W 25–07	2–3	
1900*	at Eastern Michigan	L 9–13	2–4	Gymnasium; Ypsilanti, MI
*Non-conference game. (#) Tournament seedings in parentheses.
