= Albion Methodists football, 1900–1909 =

American college football seasons

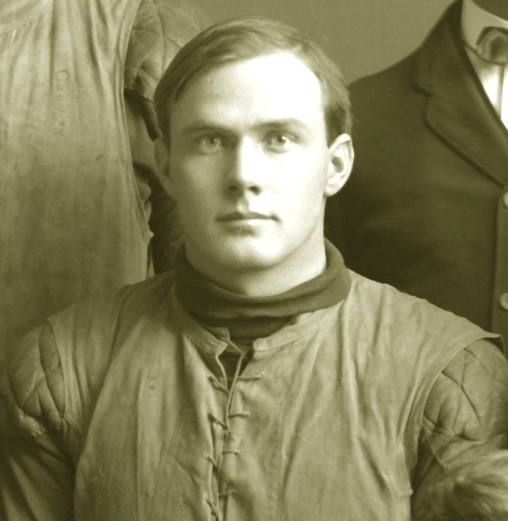
Joe Maddock, star of 1901 Albion team

The Albion Methodists football teams (later known as the Albion Britons) represented Albion College in American football during the program's third decade of college football, from 1900 to 1909. The team competed as a member of the Michigan Intercollegiate Athletic Association (MIAA). Highlights included the following:

- The 1900 Albion Methodists football team compiled 6–1–2 record (5–0–1 in MIAA games) and won the MIAA championship. The Methodists twice defeated Michigan Agricultural College (now Michigan State University) during the 1900 season by combined scores of 52 to 0.
- Joe Maddock starred for the 1901 Albion team. He was recruited by Fielding H. Yost to transfer to Michigan where he scored 13 touchdowns in 1902 and 10 in 1903. Strenghend by the addition of Maddock, the Wolverines defeated Albion, 88–0 in 1902, and 76–0 in 1903.
- The 1904 Albion Methodists football team compiled a 7–0–1 record and won the MIAA championship in its first season under head coach Walter S. Kennedy.
- The 1908 Albion Methodists football team compiled a 5–0–2 record and won the MIAA championship in its third season under Kennedy.

Chester Brewer, who was later head coach for 10 years at Michigan Agricultural, was Albion's head coach from 1900 to 1902. Kennedy, who had been the quarterback and captain of the University of Chicago's football teams in 1898 and 1899, was Albion's head coach for the 1904, 1905, 1908, and 1909 seasons.

The team played its home games at Winter-Lau Field in Albion, Michigan; the field was built in 1900 with funds donated by John Winter and Oliver Lau.

== 1900 ==
1900 Albion Methodists football

MIAA champion
- Conference: Michigan Intercollegiate Athletic Association
- Record: 6–1–2 (5–0–1 MIAA)
- Head coach: Chester Brewer (2nd season)
- Home stadium: Winter-Lau Field

The 1900 Albion Methodists football team represented Albion College in the Michigan Intercollegiate Athletic Association (MIAA) during the 1900 college football season. The team compiled a 6–1–2 record and won the MIAA championship. The team also swept a two-game series with Michigan Agricultural (later renamed Michigan State University), defeating the Aggies by scores of 23–0 and 29–0.

Albion was led in 1900 by second-year head coach Chester Brewer who went on to be the head coach at Michigan State for 10 years and the athletic director at the University of Missouri for 13 years.

Joe Maddock played principally at right halfback and was the star of the 1900 Albion team. Maddock later became a star for Fielding H. Yost's undefeated national championship teams at Michigan in 1902 and 1903.

=== Schedule ===
Date	Time	Opponent	Site	Result	Attendance	Source
September 22		Albion High School*	Albion, MI	W 17–0		
September 29		at Michigan Agricultural	East Lansing, MI	W 23–0		
October 6		Michigan Agricultural	Albion athletic field; Albion, MI	W 29–0		
October 13		at Olivet	Olivet, MI	W 12–0		
October 20		at Alma*	Alma, MI	T 12–12	300	
October 22		Hillsdale	Albion, MI	W 30–5		
November 3	2:45 p.m.	at Kalamazoo	Kalamazoo College campus; Kalamazoo, MI	W 23–0	1,000	
November 10		Olivet	Albion, MI	T 0–0		
November 29		Alma*	Winter-Lau Field; Albion, MI	L 0–23		
*Non-conference game

== 1901 ==
1901 Albion Methodists football
- Conference: Michigan Intercollegiate Athletic Association
- Record: 7–4–1 (5–3–1 MIAA)
- Head coach: Chester Brewer (3rd season)
- Captain: P. B. Exelby

The 1901 Albion Methodists football team represented Albion College in the Michigan Intercollegiate Athletic Association (MIAA) during the 1901 college football season. The team compiled a 7–4–1 record. One year earlier, the 1900 Albion team was the MIAA champion with a 6–1–2 record and six shutouts to its credit.

Albion played five of its games in 1901 against opponents that later became NCAA Division I FBS football programs, compiling a 2–2–1 record in those games. Albion opened its season with a loss to national champion Michigan, a team that outscored its 1901 opponents by a total of 550 to 0. Albion also played two games against Michigan Agricultural (later renamed Michigan State University), resulting in a loss and a tie. The team also swept a two-game series with Michigan State Normal (later renamed Eastern Michigan University), defeating the Normal School by scores of 29–0 and 39–6.

Albion was led in 1901 by third-year head coach Chester Brewer who went on to be the head coach at Michigan State for 10 years and the athletic director at the University of Missouri for 13 years.

Tackle P. B. Exelby was the team captain. Joe Maddock played principally at right halfback and was the star of the 1901 Albion team. He was so effective against Michigan that coach Fielding H. Yost enticed him to transfer there. He became a star for Yost's "Point-a-Minute" teams in 1902 and 1903.

=== Schedule ===
Date	Opponent	Site	Result	Attendance	Source
September 21	Albion High School*	Albion, MI	W 34–0		
September 28	at Michigan*	Regents Field; Ann Arbor, MI	L 0–50		
October 5	at Kalamazoo	Kalamazoo, MI	W 18–5		
October 12	Michigan Agricultural	Albion, MI	L 0–11		
October 21	Alma*	Albion, MI	W 5–0		
October 26	at Olivet	Olivet, MI	L 12–24		
November 2	at Michigan Agricultural	Lansing, MI	T 17–17	1,000	
November 5	at Hillsdale	Martin Field; Hillsdale, MI	W 28–0		
November 11	Olivet	Olivet, MI	L 0–16		
November 16	at Michigan State Normal	Ypsilanti, MI	W 29–0		
November 25	Michigan State Normal	Albion, MI	W 39–6		
November 28	at Kalamazoo	Kalamazoo, MI	W 17–5		
*Non-conference game

== 1902 ==
1902 Albion Methodists football
- Conference: Michigan Intercollegiate Athletic Association
- Record: 4–6 (4–3 MIAA)
- Head coach: Chester Brewer (4th season)
- Home stadium: Winter-Lau Field

1902 Michigan Intercollegiate Athletic Association football standings
	Conf.					Overall
Team	W		L		T	W		L		T
Olivet +	5	–	1	–	0	5	–	1	–	0
Alma +	4	–	1	–	0	7	–	1	–	0
Albion	4	–	3	–	0	4	–	6	–	0
Michigan Agricultural	2	–	2	–	0	4	–	5	–	0
Hillsdale	0	–	3	–	0	2	–	4	–	0
Kalamazoo	0	–	5	–	0	3	–	5	–	1
+ – Conference co-champions

The 1902 Albion Methodists football team represented Albion College in the Michigan Intercollegiate Athletic Association (MIAA) during the 1902 college football season. In its fourth and final year under head coach Chester Brewer, Albion compiled an overall record of 4–6 record with a mark of 4–3 in conference play.

=== Schedule ===
Date	Time	Opponent	Site	Result	Attendance	Source
September 20		Albion High School*	Albion, MI	L 0–18		
September 27		at Michigan*	Regents Field; Ann Arbor, MI	L 0–88	2,000	
October 4		at Alma	Davis Field; Alma, MI	L 0–12		
October 11	3:00 p.m.	at Detroit Athletic Club*	Woodward Avenue field; Detroit, MI	L 5–11	600	
October 18	3:15 p.m.	at Kalamazoo	Kalamazoo, MI	W 30–0		
October 22		Hillsdale	Winter-Lau Field; Albion, MI	W 46–0		
October 31		Alma	Winter-Lau Field; Albion, MI	W 18–6		
November 8		at Olivet	Olivet, MI	L 0–13		
November 15		Michigan Agricultural	Winter-Lau Field; Albion, MI	L 11–22		
November 27	1:30 p.m.	Kalamazoo	Winter-Lau Field; Albion, MI	W 40–0		
*Non-conference game

=== Second team schedule ===
Date	Opponent	Site	Result	Source
October 3	at Devlin's Business College	Fair grounds; Jackson, MI	L 0–38	

== 1903 ==
1903 Albion Methodists football
- Conference: Michigan Intercollegiate Athletic Association
- Record: 3–3–2 (3–2–1 MIAA)
- Head coach: Julius Nufer (4th season)

1903 Michigan Intercollegiate Athletic Association football standings
	Conf.					Overall
Team	W		L		T	W		L		T
Michigan Agricultural +	4	–	1	–	0	6	–	1	–	1
Albion	3	–	2	–	1	3	–	3	–	2
+ – Conference co-champions

The 1903 Albion Methodists football team represented Albion College in the Michigan Intercollegiate Athletic Association (MIAA) during the 1903 college football season. In their first and only year under head coach Julius Nufer, the Methodists compiled a 3–3–2 record (3–2–1 in MIAA games) and were outscored by a total of 117 to 60. Of the 117 points given up during the 1903 season, more than half (76) were scored by Michigan's Point-a-Minute team in a 26-minute game on October 8. Excluding the Michigan game, Albion outscored its other opponents by a total of 60 to 41.

=== Schedule ===
Date	Opponent	Site	Result	Attendance	Source
October 8	at Michigan*	Ann Arbor, MI	L 0–76		
October 10	Michigan freshmen*	Winter-Lau Field; Albion, MI	T 0–0		
October 16	Alma	Winter-Lau Field; Albion, MI	W 16–6		
October 24	at Kalamazoo	Recreation Park; Kalamazoo, MI	W 6–0		
October 31	at Alma	Alma, MI	L 5–17		
November 13	at Michigan Agricultural	M.A.C. athletic field; East Lansing, MI	T 6–6		
November 21	Hillsdale	Hillsdale, MI	W 22–0	400	
November 26	Kalamazoo	Winter-Lau Field; Albion, MI	L 5–12		
*Non-conference game

== 1904 ==
1904 Albion Methodists football

MIAA champion
- Conference: Michigan Intercollegiate Athletic Association
- Record: 7–0–1 (5–0 MIAA)
- Head coach: Walter S. Kennedy (1st season)
- Home stadium: Winter-Lau Field

The 1904 Albion Methodists football team represented Albion College in the Michigan Intercollegiate Athletic Association (MIAA) during the 1904 college football season. In its first season under head coach Walter S. Kennedy, Albion compiled an overall record of 7–0–1 with a mark of 5–0 in conference play, winning the MIAA title. The Methodists held every opponent scoreless, outscoring opponents by a total of 206 to 0. The team's victories included games against two future NCAA Division I Football Bowl Subdivision (FBS) programs, a 4–0 victory over otherwise undefeated Michigan Agricultural and a 68–0 victory over Michigan State Normal.

=== Schedule ===
Date	Time	Opponent	Site	Result	Source
September 29		Albion High School*	Winter-Lau Field; Albion MI	W 5–0	
October 1		Michigan freshmen*	Winter-Lau Field; Albion, MI	T 0–0	
October 15		Michigan State Normal*	Winter-Lau Field; Albion, MI	W 68–0	
October 22		Michigan Agricultural	Winter-Lau Field; Albion, MI	W 4–0	
October 29	2:30 p.m.	at Kalamazoo	Kalamazoo College campus; Kalamazoo, MI	W 44–0	
November 5		at Olivet	Reed's Field; Olivet, MI	W 36–0	
November 11		Alma	Winter-Lau Field; Albion, MI	W 27–0	
November 19		Hillsdale	Albion, MI	W 22–0	
*Non-conference game

== 1905 ==
1905 Albion Methodists football
- Conference: Michigan Intercollegiate Athletic Association
- Record: 5–2 (4–1 MIAA)
- Head coach: Walter S. Kennedy (2nd season)
- Home stadium: Winter-Lau Field

1905 Michigan Intercollegiate Athletic Association football standings
	Conf.					Overall
Team	W		L		T	W		L		T
Michigan Agricultural $	5	–	0	–	0	9	–	2	–	0
Albion	4	–	1	–	0	5	–	2	–	0
Olivet	3	–	3	–	0	4	–	4	–	0
Kalamazoo	3	–	3	–	0	3	–	6	–	0
Alma	1	–	4	–	0	5	–	4	–	0
Hillsdale	0	–	5	–	0	4	–	5	–	0
$ – Conference champion

The 1905 Albion Methodists football team represented Albion College as a member of the Michigan Intercollegiate Athletic Association (MIAA) during the 1905 college football season. In its second season under head coach Walter S. Kennedy, Albion compiled an overall record of 5–2 record with a mark of 4–1 in conference play, placing second in the MIAA.

=== Schedule ===
Date	Time	Opponent	Site	Result	Attendance	Source
October 7		Michigan freshmen*	Albion, MI	W 11–0		
October 14		at Alma	Davis Field; Alma, MI	W 24–0		
October 21		Kalamazoo	Albion, MI	W 14–5		
October 25		at Michigan*	Regents Field; Ann Arbor, MI	L 0–70		
November 4		at Hillsdale	Hillsdale, MI	W 6–0	300	
November 11	2:30 p.m.	at Michigan Agricultural	East Lansing, MI	L 10–47	3,000	
November 20		Olivet	Albion, MI	W 14–6		
*Non-conference game

== 1906 ==
1906 Albion Methodists football
- Conference: Michigan Intercollegiate Athletic Association
- Record: 3–4–1 (1–4–1 MIAA)
- Head coach: W. D. Chadwick (1st season)
- Home stadium: Winter-Lau Field

The 1906 Albion Methodists football team represented Albion College as a member of the Michigan Intercollegiate Athletic Association (MIAA) during the 1906 college football season. In its first season under head coach W. D. Chadwick, Albion compiled a 3–4–1 record (1–4–1 in MIAA games) and outscored opponents by a total of 67 to 62.

=== Schedule ===
Date	Opponent	Site	Result	Attendance	Source
October 6	Olivet	Albion, MI	L 6–9		
October 13	at Adrian*	Adrian, MI	W 6–0		
October 20	Adrian*	Albion, MI	W 40–0	450	
October 29	Hillsdale	Albion, MI	W 10–0	750	
November 3	at Michigan Agricultural	College Field; East Lansing, MI	L 0–37		
November 10	Michigan Agricultural	Winter-Lau Field; Albion, MI	L 0–5	750	
November 17	at Olivet	Reed's Field; Olivet, MI	T 5–5		
	Alma		L 0–6		
*Non-conference game

== 1907 ==
1907 Albion Methodists football
- Conference: Michigan Intercollegiate Athletic Association
- Record: 2–4 (1–4 MIAA)
- Head coach: W. D. Chadwick (2nd season)
- Home stadium: Winter-Lau Field

The 1907 Albion Methodists football team represented Albion College as a member of the Michigan Intercollegiate Athletic Association (MIAA) during the 1907 college football season. In its second and final season under head coach W. D. Chadwick, Albion compiled a 2–4 record (1–4 in MIAA games) and were outscored by a total of 117 to 38.

=== Schedule ===
Date	Opponent	Site	Result	Source
October 9	Western State Normal*	Albion, MI	W 5–0	
October 12	Kalamazoo	Albion, MI	W 25–6	
October 19	at Olivet	Olivet, MI	L 0–73	
November 2	at Hillsdale	Martin Field; Hillsdale, MI	L 0–21	
November 15	Alma	Albion, MI	L 0–5	
November 23	Olivet	Winter-Lau Field; Albion, MI	L 8–12	
*Non-conference game

== 1908 ==
1908 Albion Methodists football

MIAA champion
- Conference: Michigan Intercollegiate Athletic Association
- Record: 5–0–2 (3–0–2 MIAA)
- Head coach: Walter S. Kennedy (3rd season)
- Home stadium: Winter-Lau Field

The 1908 Albion Methodists football team represented Albion College as a member of the Michigan Intercollegiate Athletic Association (MIAA) during the 1908 college football season. In its third season under head coach Walter S. Kennedy, Albion compiled a 5–0–2 record (3–0–2 in MIAA games), shut out six of seven opponents, and outscored all opponents by a total of 182 to 12.

=== Schedule ===
Date	Opponent	Site	Result	Source
October 10	at Adrian	Adrian, MI	T 0–0	
October 17	Hillsdale	Winter-Lau Field; Albion, MI	W 6–0	
October 24	McFadden Physical Cultural College*	Winter-Lau Field; Albion, MI	W 79–0	
October 31	at Kalamazoo	Kalamazoo, MI	W 21–0	
November 7	Western State Normal*	Walter-Lau Field; Albion, MI	W 24–0	
November 13	Kalamazoo	Albion, MI	W 40–0	
November 21	at Olivet	Reed Field; Olivet, MI	T 12–12	
*Non-conference game

== 1909 ==
1909 Albion Methodists football
- Conference: Michigan Intercollegiate Athletic Association
- Record: 3–3–1 (2–2–1 MIAA)
- Head coach: Walter S. Kennedy (4th season)
- Captain: J. Fred McKale

The 1909 Albion Methodists football team represented Albion College as a member of the Michigan Intercollegiate Athletic Association (MIAA) during the 1909 college football season. In its fourth season under head coach Walter S. Kennedy, Albion compiled a 3–3–1 record (2–2–1 in MIAA games) and outscored opponents by a total of 76 to 74. J. Fred McKale was the team captain.

=== Schedule ===
Date	Opponent	Site	Result	Source
October 2	Kalamazoo	Albion, MI	W 11–5	
October 9	Western State Normal*	Albion, MI	W 10–6	
October 16	Adrian	Albion, MI	W 47–0	
October 23	at Hillsdale	Hillsdale, MI	T 0–0	
October 30	at Kalamazoo	Kalamazoo, MI	L 0–5	
November 13	Olivet	Albion, MI	L 6–26	
November 20	at Michigan freshmen*	Ferry Field; Ann Arbor, MI	L 2–32	
*Non-conference game
