= 1907 Michigan Agricultural Aggies football team =

American college football season

1907 Michigan Agricultural Aggies football

MIAA champion
- Conference: Michigan Intercollegiate Athletic Association
- Record: 4–2–1 (1–0–1 MIAA)
- Head coach: Chester Brewer (5th season)
- Captain: Walter H. Small
- Home stadium: College Field

The 1907 Michigan Agricultural Aggies football team represented Michigan Agricultural College (MAC)—now known as Michigan State University—as a member of the Michigan Intercollegiate Athletic Association (MIAA) during the 1907 college football season. In their fifth year under head coach Chester Brewer, the Aggies compiled an overall record of 4–2–1, with a mark of 1–0–1 in conference play, winning the MIAA title, and outscored opponents 127 to 60.

== Schedule ==
Date	Time	Opponent	Site	Result	Attendance	Source
October 3		Detroit College*	College Field; East Lansing, MI	W 17–0		
October 5		Michigan School for the Deaf*	College Field; East Lansing, MI	W 40–0		
October 12		at Michigan*	Ferry Field; Ann Arbor, MI (rivalry)	L 0–46		
October 26		Wabash*	College Field; East Lansing, MI	W 15–6		
November 16	2:20 p.m.	Olivet	College Field; East Lansing, MI	W 55–4	3,000	
November 23	2:00 p.m.	at Alma	David Field; Alma, MI	T 0–0		
November 28		at Detroit Athletic Club*	Detroit, MI, MI	L 0–4		
*Non-conference game

== Game summaries ==
=== Michigan ===
Michigan Agricultural at Michigan

Team	1	2	Total
Michigan Agricultural	0	0	0
• Michigan	24	22	46

- Date: October 12, 1907
- Location: Ferry Field • Ann Arbor, MI
- Referee: Eldridge (Michigan)

On October 12, 1907, the Aggies lost to Michigan by a 46 to 0 score at Ferry Field. It was the third game in the Michigan - Michigan State football rivalry. Michigan had won the two prior meetings by a combined score of 158 to 0. In 40 minutes of play, Michigan scored eight touchdowns and did not allow a single first down to be made by the Aggies. Team captain Paul Magoffin made his first appearance of the season and scored five touchdowns. The game was played in 20-minute halves.
