= Marshall School District =

Marshall School District may refer to:

- Searcy County School District, formerly named Marshall School District, in Marshall, Arkansas.
- Marshall Public Schools, in Marshall, Michigan.
- Marshall Independent School District in Marshall, Texas.
- Marshall School District (Wisconsin), in Marshall, Dane County, Wisconsin.
