= W. D. Chadwick =

American sports coach and college athletics administrator (1883–1934)

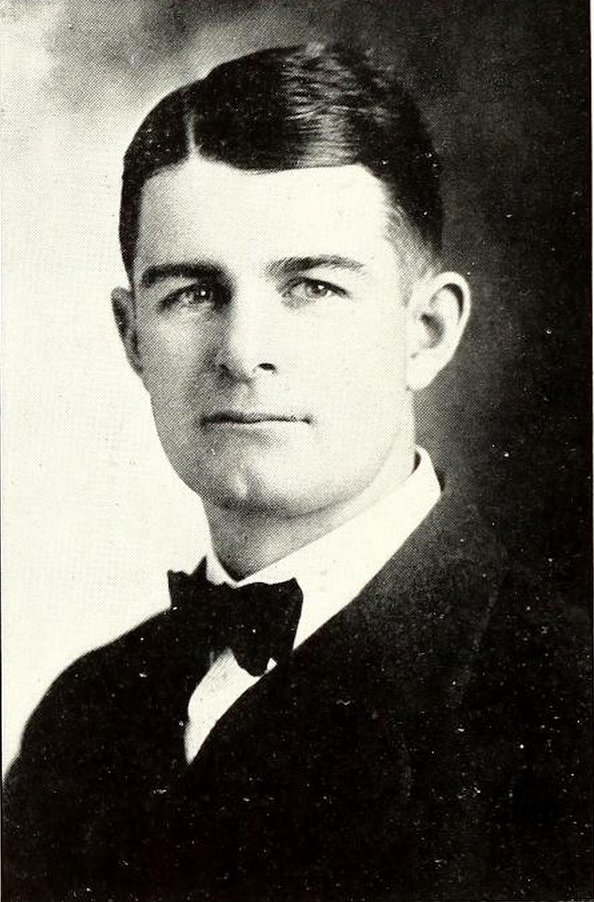
- Chadwick pictured in Reveille 1917, Mississippi State yearbook

Biographical details
- Born: December 20, 1883; Ohio, U.S.
- Died: June 5, 1934 (aged 50) near Raymond, Mississippi, U.S.
- Education: Marietta College

Coaching career (HC unless noted)

Football
- 1905: Maryville (TN)
- 1906–1907: Albion
- 1909–1913: Mississippi A&M

Basketball
- 1910–1911: Mississippi A&M

Baseball
- c. 1907: Albion
- 1910–1918: Mississippi A&M

Administrative career (AD unless noted)
- 1906–1909: Albion
- 1909–1930: Mississippi A&M

Head coaching record
- Overall: 38–25–3 (football); 2–4 (basketball); 120–72–9 (baseball, Mississippi A&M only)
- Bowls: 1–0

Accomplishments and honors

Championships
- Baseball; 2 SIAA (1911, 1918)

William Dean Chadwick (December 20, 1883 – June 5, 1934) was an American college football, college baseball, and college basketball coach, and athletics administrator. Chadwick served as head football coach at Albion College, and the head football, basketball, baseball coach and athletic director at Mississippi A&M College (now known as Mississippi State University).

== Maryville ==
During the 1905–06 academic year, he was credited with being the physical director and football coach at Maryville College in Maryville, Tennessee.

== Albion College and Albion State Normal School ==
Chadwick was hired to coach baseball, football, and track at Albion College in 1906 season. He remained the football coach in 1907. Chadwick was also and assistant professor of English and athletic director at Albion for three years until leaving in 1909 for Albion State Normal School in Albion, Idaho, where he was appointed as athletic director and head of the English department.

== Mississippi A&M ==
=== Football ===
After leaving Albion, Chadwick served as the head football coach at Mississippi A&M from 1909 until 1913 compiling an overall record of 29–12–2. His most notable accomplishment during that time was leading the Aggies to their first ever bowl appearance and win in the 1912 Bacardi Bowl. Chadwick did not actually coach the game, but instead opted to stay home and attend the funeral of A&M end Levi Gaston Bass who had died from meningitis that he developed as a result of an injury he suffered during a game against Birmingham College. Chadwick put assistant coach and future A&M and Indiana head coach Earl C. Hayes in charge of the squad for the trip to Cuba. The Aggies defeated Club Atletico de Cuba by a score of 12–0. Along with being the first postseason game for A&M it was also the last college football game to be played in which touchdowns were worth five points (they were increased to six before the following season) making the Aggies the last college football team to score a five-point TD.

=== Baseball ===
His longest stint as a head coach with one program came when he coached the Mississippi A&M baseball team from 1910 to 1918. During his nine seasons as Aggie skipper, he compiled an overall record of 120–72–9 and led the Aggies to Southern Intercollegiate Athletic Association championships in 1911 and 1918.

=== Basketball ===
Chadwick was the second basketball coach in A&M history. He served one season in that capacity leading the Aggies to a 2–4 record during the 1910–11 season. Following that season he turned the reins over to Earl C. Hayes but continued to coach football and baseball.

=== Athletic director ===
In addition to coaching three different programs at A&M, Chadwick also served as athletic director from 1909 to 1930. During his time as AD he worked on improving athletic facilities such as building baseball and football fields, tennis courts, and constructing the school’s first gymnasium. Chadwick also taught physical education. He was relieved of his duties as athletic director during the so-called "Bilbo Purge" of 1930 during which time Governor Theodore G. Bilbo, along with the boards of trustees of the schools, made several sweeping staff and administration changes at Mississippi's institutions of higher learning. Chadwick was retained as "Professor unassigned, outside of athletics, at the same salary."

== Late life and death ==
After leaving athletics, Chadwick worked for the Lamar Life Insurance Company. He was killed on June 5, 1934 in an automobile accident near Raymond, Mississippi.

== Honor and awards ==
Chadwick was inducted into the Mississippi State University Sports Hall of Fame in 1974. Chadwick Lake, located on the Mississippi State campus near the Bryan Athletic Administration Building, is named in his honor.

== Head coaching record ==
=== Football ===
| Year | Team | Overall | Conference | Standing | Bowl/playoffs |
|---|---|---|---|---|---|
Maryville Scots (Independent) (1905)
| 1905 | Maryville | 4–5 | | | |
| Maryville: | | 4–5 | | | |
Albion Methodists (Michigan Intercollegiate Athletic Association) (1906–1907)
| 1906 | Albion | 3–4–1 | 2–4–1 | | |
| 1907 | Albion | 2–4 | 1–4 | | |
| Albion: | | 5–8–1 | 3–8–1 | | |
Mississippi A&M Aggies (Southern Intercollegiate Athletic Association) (1909–1913)
| 1909 | Mississippi A&M | 5–4 | 0–3 | | |
| 1910 | Mississippi A&M | 7–2 | 5–2 | | |
| 1911 | Mississippi A&M | 7–2–1 | 4–2–1 | | W Bacardi |
| 1912 | Mississippi A&M | 4–3 | 3–2 | | |
| 1913 | Mississippi A&M | 6–1–1 | 5–1–1 | | |
| Mississippi A&M: | | 29–12–2 | 17–10–2 | | |
| Total: | | 38–25–3 | | | |

=== Basketball ===
Record table
| Season | Team | Overall | Conference | Standing | Postseason |
|---|---|---|---|---|---|
Mississippi A&M Aggies (Southern Intercollegiate Athletic Association) (1910–1911)
| 1910–11 | Mississippi A&M | 2–4 | | | |
| Mississippi A&M: | | 2–4 | | | |
| Total: | | 2–4 | | | |

=== Baseball ===
Record table
| Season | Team | Overall | Conference | Standing | Postseason |
|---|---|---|---|---|---|
Mississippi A&M Aggies (Southern Intercollegiate Athletic Association) (1910–1918)
| 1910 | Mississippi A&M | 16–11 | 2–5 | | |
| 1911 | Mississippi A&M | 16–7 | 10–6 | 1st | |
| 1912 | Mississippi A&M | 14–8–1 | 7–7 | | |
| 1913 | Mississippi A&M | 16–10–2 | 8–6–1 | | |
| 1914 | Mississippi A&M | 11–9–2 | 5–6–1 | | |
| 1915 | Mississippi A&M | 12–9–2 | 8–6–2 | | |
| 1916 | Mississippi A&M | 11–7 | 6–6 | | |
| 1917 | Mississippi A&M | 14–3–2 | 9–1–2 | | |
| 1918 | Mississippi A&M | 10–8 | 4–7 | 1st | |
| Mississippi A&M: | | 120–72–9 | 57–50–6 | | |
| Total: | | 120–72–9 | | | |
National champion Postseason invitational champion Conference regular season champion Conference regular season and conference tournament champion Division regular season champion Division regular season and conference tournament champion Conference tournament champion
