= Michigan School for the Deaf Superintendent's Cottage =

- Superintendent's Cottage
- U.S. National Register of Historic Places
- Michigan State Historic Site
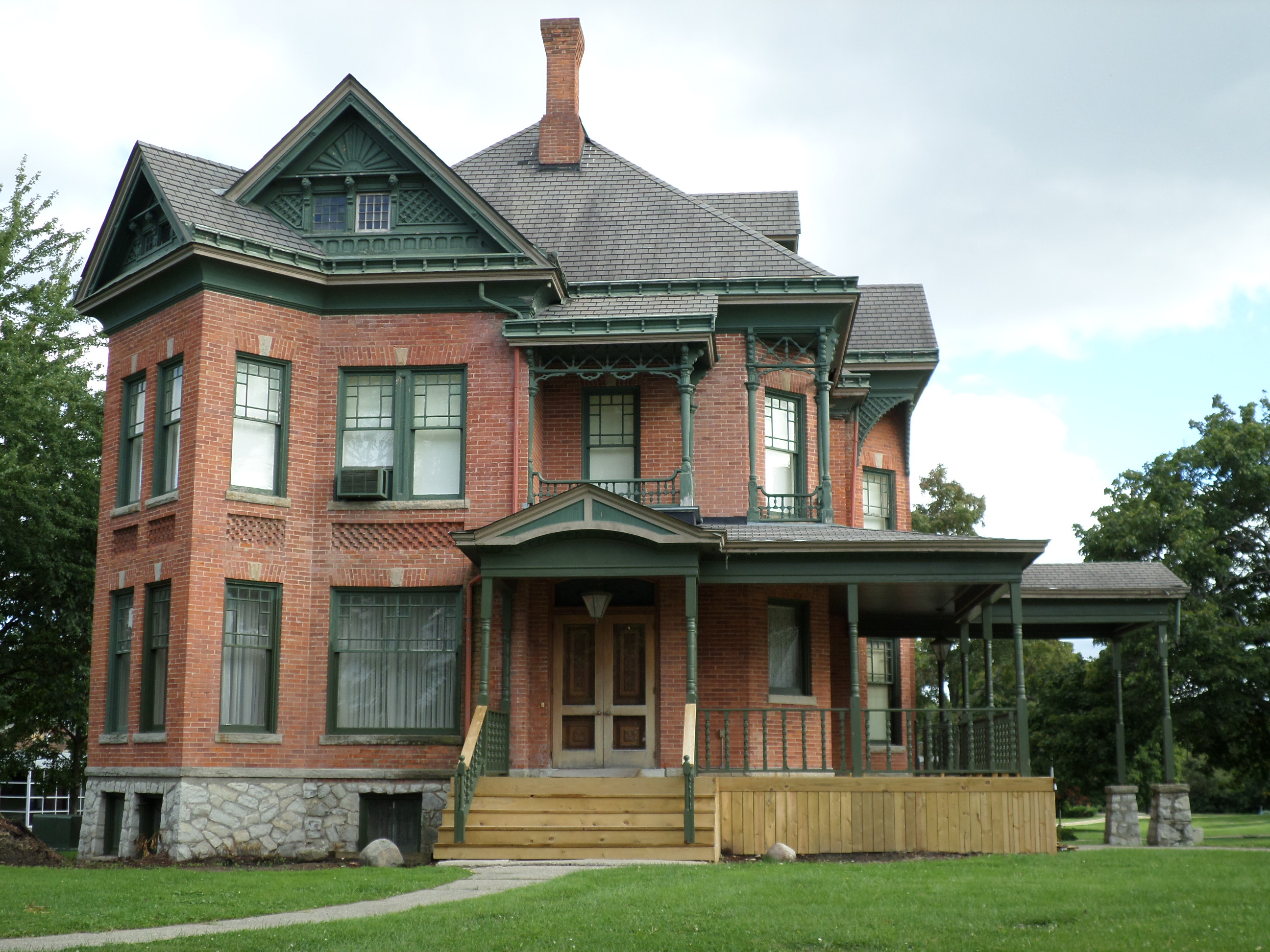
- Interactive map
- Location: Michigan School for the Deaf campus, Flint, Michigan
- Coordinates: 43°00′20″N 83°42′08″W
- Area: 2 acres (0.81 ha)
- Built: 1888
- Architectural style: Queen Anne
- NRHP reference No.: 75000944
- Added to NRHP: July 7, 1975

The Superintendent's Cottage at the Michigan School for the Deaf is a single-family home located on Beaver Drive, on the Michigan School for the Deaf campus, in Flint, Michigan, It was listed on the National Register of Historic Places in 1975.

== History ==
The state of Michigan created the "Michigan Asylum for the Deaf, Dumb, and Blind" in 1848, but it was not until five years later that funds were finally secured to begin the school. Land for the campus was donated by a private citizen in Flint, and the first classes were held in February 1854. Classes were held in temporary facilities until the first building was constructed in 1857. In 1881, blind students were transferred to a campus in Lansing, leaving the Flint campus to serve the deaf students; in 1887 the name of the school was changed to the "Michigan School for the Deaf," reflecting a change from the earlier institutional focus of the school.

Construction on the Superintendent's Cottage began during the diphtheria epidemic of 1888, as housing space became tight. Except for the masonry, the cottage was constructed almost entirely by the students attending the school. Construction was completed in 1890, and beginning with Francis Clark in 1892, every superintendent of the school has lived in the house. The house was enlarged in 1910.

== Description ==
The Superintendent's Cottage is a 2½ story red brick Queen Anne style house with a fieldstone foundation and a gable roof. The main facade is dominated by a massive fieldstone porch topped by a roof supported by pillars. A two-story addition is connected at the rear. The house includes Queen Anne detailing such as a projecting bay, roof bracketry, and a small balcony at the second story with an intricately carved balustrade. The interior features woodwork and cabinetry carved by the school students, including two massive oak entry doors, an oak fireplace surround, and a carved ceiling in the dining room.
