= 1905 Michigan Agricultural Aggies football team =

American college football season

1905 Michigan Agricultural Aggies football

MIAA champion
- Conference: Michigan Intercollegiate Athletic Association
- Record: 9–2 (5–0 MIAA)
- Head coach: Chester Brewer (3rd season)
- Captain: Edward B. McKenna
- Home stadium: College Field

1905 Michigan Intercollegiate Athletic Association football standings
	Conf.					Overall
Team	W		L		T	W		L		T
Michigan Agricultural $	5	–	0	–	0	9	–	2	–	0
Albion	4	–	1	–	0	5	–	2	–	0
Olivet	3	–	3	–	0	4	–	4	–	0
Kalamazoo	3	–	3	–	0	3	–	6	–	0
Alma	1	–	4	–	0	5	–	4	–	0
Hillsdale	0	–	5	–	0	4	–	5	–	0
$ – Conference champion

The 1905 Michigan Agricultural Aggies football team represented Michigan Agricultural College (MAC)—now known as Michigan State University—as a member of the Michigan Intercollegiate Athletic Association (MIAA) during the 1905 college football season. In their third year under head coach Chester Brewer, the Aggies compiled an overall record of 9–2 with a mark of 5–0 in conference play, winning the MIAA title.

== Schedule ==
Date	Time	Opponent	Site	Result	Attendance	Source
September 30		Michigan School for the Deaf*	College Field; East Lansing, MI	W 42–6		
October 4		Port Huron YMCA*	College Field; East Lansing, MI	W 43–0		
October 7		at Notre Dame*	Cartier Field; Notre Dame, IN (rivalry)	L 0–28		
October 14		Michigan freshmen*	College Field; East Lansing, MI	W 24–0	1,200	
October 21		Olivet	College Field; East Lansing, MI	W 30–0		
October 23		Hillsdale	College Field; East Lansing, MI	W 18–0	800	
October 28		Armour Institute*	College Field; East Lansing, MI	W 18–0	600	
November 4	2:30 p.m.	at Kalamazoo	Athletic Park; Kalamazoo, MI	W 30–0	700	
November 11	2:30 p.m.	Albion	College Field; East Lansing, MI	W 47–10	3,000	
November 18		at Northwestern*	Northwestern Field; Evanston, IL	L 11–37	1,500	
November 25		at Alma	College Field; East Lansing, MI	W 18–0		
*Non-conference game
