= 1899–1900 Michigan State Normal Normalites men's basketball team =

American college basketball season

1899–1900 Michigan State Normal Normalites men's basketball
- Conference: Independent
- Record: 1–1
- Head coach: Leslie A. Butler (1st season)
- Home arena: Gymnasium

1899–1900 was the third year of basketball at Michigan State Normal School. Both games were played against Michigan State University. Michigan State Normal School ended up splitting the games and finished 1–1. It was the only year for coach Leslie A. Butler. John Miller was basketball Manager but resigned before any games where played.

1900 Michigan State Normal Men's College Basketball Team

Leslie A. Butler

== Roster ==
The team captain was H.W. Conklin.

Number	Name	Position	Class	Hometown
	Hugh W. Conklin	Center	Senior	Owosso, MI
	Frank Leonard Cross	Guard	Junior	Cherry Hill, MI
	C.A. Palmer	Forward	Senior	Ridgeway Township, MI
	Fred Q. Gorton	Guard	Senior	Ypsilanti, MI
	Earl Reid	Guard	Senior	Alpine Township, MI
	Edwin S. Murray	Forward	Senior	

== Schedule ==
Date time, TV	Rank^{#}	Opponent^{#}	Result	Record	Site (attendance) city, state
Non-conference regular season
February 10, 1900*; 2:45		Michigan State	W 13-9	1-0	Gymnasium; Ypsilanti, MI
March 3, 1900*		at Michigan State	L 8-25	1–1	Armory; East Lansing, Michigan
*Non-conference game. ^{#}Rankings from AP Poll. (#) Tournament seedings in parentheses. All times are in Eastern Time.

Eastern Michigan Media Guide and school yearbook list two games played while Michigan State Media Guide only list one. Game is mentioned in the February 18, 1900 edition of the Detroit Free Press.

== Game Notes ==
=== February 10, 1900 ===
Michigan Normal was leading 5-2 at the half. Cross was the leading scorer with 6 points followed by Palmer with 5 and Conklin with 2. Lansing State Journal reports the score has 13-11, while the EMU Media Guide and Detroit Free Press have 13-9.

=== March 3, 1900 ===
C.A. Palmer scored all 8 points for EMU, making four shots. The Detroit Free Press also mentions that Earl Reid played good.
