= 1901 Michigan State Normal Normalites football team =

American college football season

1901 Michigan State Normal Normalites football
- Conference: Michigan Intercollegiate Athletic Association
- Record: 3–5 (0–3 MIAA)
- Head coach: Clayton Teetzel (2nd season)
- Captain: Phillip E. Dennis

The 1901 Michigan State Normal Normalites football team was an American football team that represented Michigan State Normal College (later renamed Eastern Michigan University) as a member of the Michigan Intercollegiate Athletic Association during the 1901 college football season. In its season under head coach Clayton Teetzel, the team compiled a record of 3–5 and was outscored by a total of 167 to 58. Phillip E. Dennis was the team captain.

== Schedule ==
| Date | Opponent | Site | Result | Source |
|---|---|---|---|---|
| October 5 | at Michigan freshmen* | Ann Arbor, MI | L 20–28 | |
| October 19 | at Michigan Alkali Works* | Wyandotte, MI | W 6–5 | |
| October 26 | Michigan freshmen* | Ypsilanti, MI | L 6–12 | |
| November 2 | Michigan Alkali Works* | Ypsilanti, MI | W 12–10 | |
| November 9 | Kalamazoo | Ypsilanti, MI | L 0–39 | |
| November 16 | Albion | Ypsilanti, MI | L 0–29 | |
| November 25 | Albion | Albion, MI | L 6–39 | |
| November 28 | Michigan School for the Deaf* | Ypsilanti, MI | W 10–5 | |
*Non-conference game
