= 1902 Michigan Agricultural Aggies football team =

American college football season

1902 Michigan Agricultural Aggies football
- Conference: Michigan Intercollegiate Athletic Association
- Record: 4–5 (2–2 MIAA)
- Head coach: George Denman (2nd season)
- Captain: Arthur D. Peters
- Home stadium: College Field

1902 Michigan Intercollegiate Athletic Association football standings
	Conf.					Overall
Team	W		L		T	W		L		T
Olivet +	5	–	1	–	0	5	–	1	–	0
Alma +	4	–	1	–	0	7	–	1	–	0
Albion	4	–	3	–	0	4	–	6	–	0
Michigan Agricultural	2	–	2	–	0	4	–	5	–	0
Hillsdale	0	–	3	–	0	2	–	4	–	0
Kalamazoo	0	–	5	–	0	3	–	5	–	1
+ – Conference co-champions

The 1902 Michigan Agricultural Aggies football team represented Michigan Agricultural College (MAC)—now known as Michigan State University—as a member of the Michigan Intercollegiate Athletic Association (MIAA) during the 1902 college football season. In their second and final year under head coach George Denman, the Aggies compiled an overall record of 4–5 record with a mark of 2–2 in conference play, and were outscored by opponents 206 to 93.

== Schedule ==
Date	Opponent	Site	Result	Source
September 27	at Notre Dame*	Cartier Field; Notre Dame, IN (rivalry)	L 0–33	
October 4	Detroit*	College Field; East Lansing, MI	W 11–0	
October 8	at Michigan*	Regents Field; Ann Arbor, MI (rivalry)	L 0–119	
October 11	Hillsdale	College Field; East Lansing, MI	W 35–0	
October 18	Michigan freshmen*	College Field; East Lansing, MI	W 2–0	
October 25	DePauw*	College Field; East Lansing, MI	L 12–17	
November 1	at Olivet	Olivet, MI	L 6–11	
November 15	at Albion	Winter-Lau Field; Albion, MI	W 22–11	
November 22	Alma	College Field; East Lansing, MI	L 5–16	
*Non-conference game

== Game summaries ==
=== Michigan ===
On Wednesday, October 8, 1902, the Aggies played a mid-week game against Michigan. Michigan defeated the Aggies by a score of 119 to 0. The Wolverines scored 71 points in the first half of 20 minutes and 48 in the second half of 18 minutes. The Michigan Alumnus called it "the greatest fusillade of touchdowns ever known to the football world," excluding Michigan's 128–0 win over Buffalo in 1901. Michigan was held on downs only once in the game, and the Aggies made only three first downs. Right halfback Albert Herrnstein ran back a kickoff the length of the field and scored seven touchdowns in the game. Willie Heston and Everett Sweeley did not play in the game, and the Detroit Free Press noted: "The opinion is quite general that if Heston and Sweeley had been in the game the Buffalo record would have been beaten, but, as it was, Michigan was simply fagged out running down the field for touchdowns." After the game, The Newark Advocate wrote:

"Michigan has undoubtedly the fastest scoring team in the world, and the Ann Arbor boys play Yosts' 'hurry up' formations like clock work. It requires a fast team to take the ball, line up and score 119 points, even if they have no opponents in two 20 minute halves."
