= Julius Nufer =

American track and field athlete, sports coach, athletics administrator (1879–1949

Biographical details
- Born: April 7, 1879; Whitehall, Michigan, U.S.
- Died: June 25, 1949 (aged 70); Whitehall, Michigan, U.S.

Playing career

Football
- c. 1900: Albion
- Positions: 100-yard dash, hurdles

Coaching career (HC unless noted)

Football
- 1903: Albion
- 1904: Purdue (assistant)

Basketball
- 1904–1905: Purdue

Track and field
- 1904–1905: Purdue

Administrative career (AD unless noted)
- 1903: Albion

Head coaching record
- Overall: 3–3–2 (football); 3–6 (basketball)

Julius Jeremiah Nufer (April 7, 1879 – June 25, 1949), also referred to as Julius Jerry Nufer, James J. Nufer, and Jimmie Nufer, was an American track and field athlete and coach, college football and college basketball coach, and athletics administrator.

Nufer was born on April 7, 1879. He attended Albion College in Albion, Michigan, where competed in track as a hurdler and sprinter. He set an Michigan Intercollegiate Athletic Association (MIAA) record in the 100-yard dash with a time of 10.2 seconds. In the fall of 1903, Nufer was appointed athletic director and coach at Albion. He led the 1903 Albion Methodists football team to a record of 3–3–2 before resigning from his post at the school in December of that year.

Nufer died on June 25, 1949, in Whitehall, Michigan.

== Head coaching record ==
=== Football ===
Year	Team	Overall	Conference	Standing	Bowl/playoffs
Albion Methodists (Michigan Intercollegiate Athletic Association) (1903)
1903	Albion	3–3–2	3–2–1		
Albion:		3–3–2	3–2–1		
Total:		3–3–2			

=== Basketball ===
Record table
Season	Team	Overall	Conference	Standing	Postseason
Purdue Boilermakers (Western Conference) (1904–1905)
1904–05	Purdue	3–6	1–3	6th†	
Purdue:		3–6 (.333)	1–3 (.250)		
Total:		3–6 (.333)			

† Intramural play only; the conference did not have an official championship winner
