= 1903 Michigan Agricultural Aggies football team =

American college football season

1903 Michigan Agricultural Aggies football
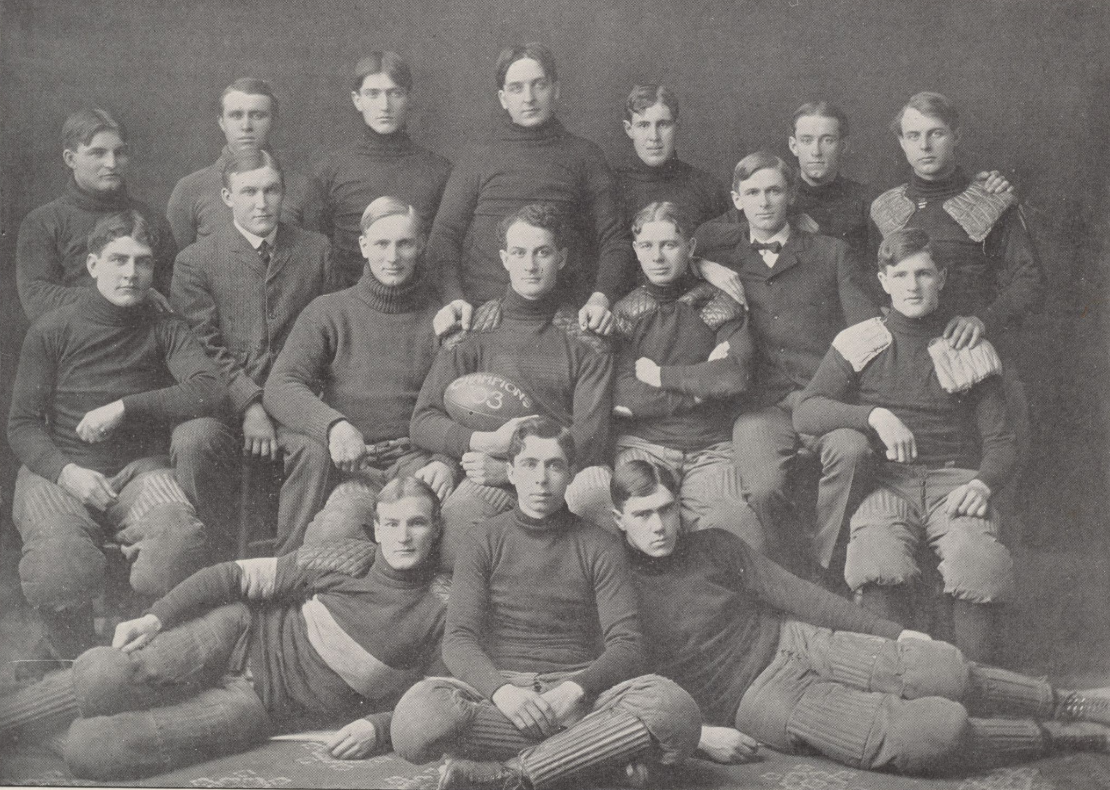

MIAA co-champion
- Conference: Michigan Intercollegiate Athletic Association
- Record: 6–1–1 (4–1 MIAA)
- Head coach: Chester Brewer (1st season)
- Captain: Frank J. Kratz
- Home stadium: College Field

1903 Michigan Intercollegiate Athletic Association football standings
| | Conf. | | | | | Overall |
| Team | W | | L | | T | W | | L | | T |
|---|---|---|---|---|---|---|---|---|---|---|
| Michigan Agricultural + | 4 | – | 1 | – | 0 | 6 | – | 1 | – | 1 |
| Albion | 3 | – | 2 | – | 1 | 3 | – | 3 | – | 2 |
+ – Conference co-champions

The 1903 Michigan Agricultural Aggies football teamrepresented Michigan Agricultural College (MAC)—now known as Michigan State University—as a member of the Michigan Intercollegiate Athletic Association (MIAA) during the 1903 college football season. In their first year under head coach Chester Brewer, the Aggies compiled an overall record of 6–1–1 with a mark of 4–1 in conference play, and outscored opponents 178 to 24.

== Schedule ==
| Date | Opponent | Site | Result | Source |
|---|---|---|---|---|
| October 3 | at Notre Dame* | Cartier Field; Notre Dame, IN (rivalry) | L 0–12 | |
| October 10 | at Alma | Alma, MI | W 11–0 | |
| October 14 | Michigan freshmen* | College Field; East Lansing, MI | W 11–0 | |
| October 17 | Kalamazoo | College Field; East Lansing, MI | W 11–0 | |
| October 31 | Detroit YMCA* | College Field; East Lansing, MI | W 51–6 | |
| November 7 | at Hillsdale | Hillsdale, MI | W 43–0 | |
| November 13 | Albion | College Field; East Lansing, MI | T 6–6 | |
| November 21 | Olivet | College Field; East Lansing, MI | W 45–0 | |
*Non-conference game
