= 1900 Michigan Agricultural Aggies football team =

American college football season

1900 Michigan Agricultural Aggies football
- Conference: Michigan Intercollegiate Athletic Association
- Record: 1–4 (1–3 MIAA)
- Head coach: Charles Bemies (2nd season)
- Captain: Charles A. McCue

The 1900 Michigan Agricultural Aggies football team represented Michigan Agricultural College (MAC)—now known as Michigan State University—as a member of the Michigan Intercollegiate Athletic Association (MIAA) during the 1900 college football season. In their second year under head coach Charles Bemies, the Aggies compiled an overall record of 1–4 with a mark of 1–3 in conference play.

== Schedule ==
Date	Opponent	Site	Result	Source
September 29	Albion	East Lansing, MI	L 0–23	
October 6	at Albion	Albion athletic field; Albion, MI	L 0–29	
October 13	Adrian	East Lansing, MI	W 47–0	
October 20	at Detroit Athletic Club*	D. A. C. Field; Detroit, MI	L 6–21	
October 27	Alma	East Lansing, MI	L 0–23	
*Non-conference game
