= Chester Brewer =

American sports coach and athletic director

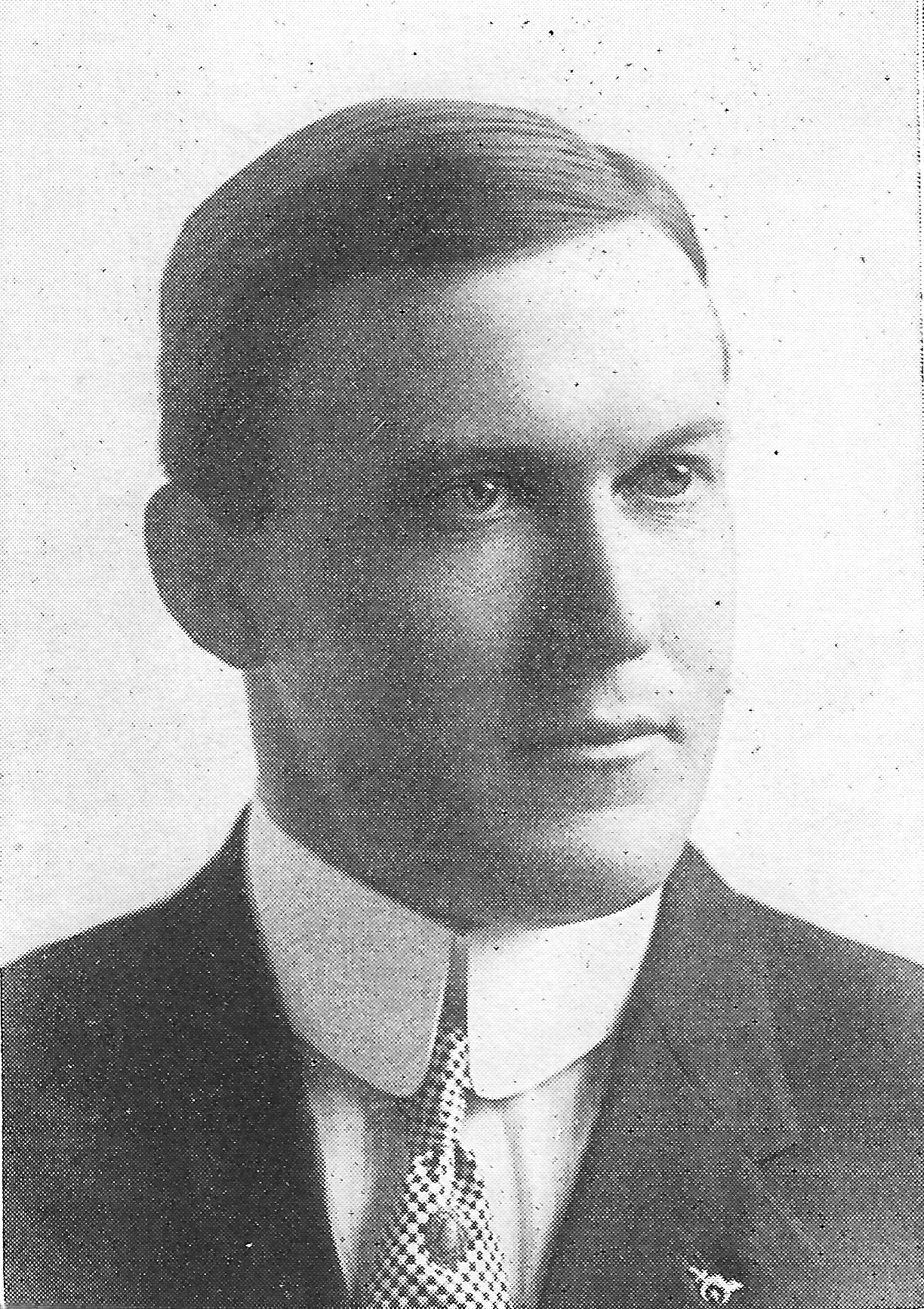

Biographical details
- Born: November 26, 1875; Owosso, Michigan, U.S.
- Died: April 16, 1953 (aged 77); Columbia, Missouri, U.S.

Playing career

Football
- 1896: Wisconsin

Coaching career (HC unless noted)

Football
- 1899–1902: Albion
- 1903–1910: Michigan Agricultural
- 1911–1913: Missouri
- 1917: Michigan Agricultural
- 1919: Michigan Agricultural
- 1922: Cal Aggies

Basketball
- 1903–1910: Michigan Agricultural
- 1910–1911: Missouri
- 1922–1923: Cal Aggies

Baseball
- 1904–1910: Michigan Agricultural
- 1911: Missouri
- 1914–1917: Missouri
- 1918–1920: Michigan Agricultural
- 1933–1934: Missouri

Administrative career (AD unless noted)
- 1911–1917: Missouri
- 1919–1922: Michigan Agricultural
- 1923–1935: Missouri

Head coaching record
- Overall: 94–52–14 (football); 84–36 (basketball); 148–93–4 (baseball)

Accomplishments and honors

Championships
- Football; 4 MIAA (1900, 1903, 1905, 1907); 1 Missouri Valley (1913)

Chester Leland Brewer (November 26, 1875 – April 16, 1953) was an American college football, college basketball, college baseball, and track and field coach and athletic director. He served as the head football coach at Albion College (1899–1902), Michigan Agricultural College—now known as Michigan State University (1903–1910, 1917, 1919), the University of Missouri (1911–1913), and the Northern Branch of the College of Agriculture—now known as the University of California, Davis (1922), compiling a career college football head coaching record of 94–52–14. Brewer was also the head basketball coach at Michigan Agricultural (1903–1910), Missouri (1910–1911) and Northern Branch (1922–1923), tallying a mark of 84–36, and the head baseball coach at Michigan Agricultural (1904–1910, 1918–1920) and Missouri (1911, 1914–1917, 1933–1934), amassing a record of 148–93–4.

== Coaching career ==
From 1903 to 1910, and in 1917 and 1919, Brewer coached football at Michigan Agricultural College, where he compiled a 58–23–7 record, making him one of the school's most prolific coaches.

From 1911 to 1913, he coached football at the University of Missouri, where he compiled a 14–8–2 record. During his years at the Missouri, Brewer fulfilled many roles. He was hired as athletic director in 1910 and wasted little time in leaving his mark at the university, as he was one of the founding members of the M Men's Club. He founded the club on the eve of the 1911 football game against Kansas, and the organization became the sponsor for intramural sports championships at the university. Brewer was also the coach of the 1911 baseball team, which had an 8–3 record. He assumed the leadership of the baseball team a second time from 1914 to 1917 and achieved a 49–15–3 record. He remained at the Missouri until 1917 and at different periods also coached basketball and track. Brewer is also credited with beginning the homecoming tradition at the University of Missouri and the entire nation with the 1911 Kansas vs. Missouri football game.

Brewer left Missouri at the end of the 1917 school year to serve in World War I. He spent the next year directing training camp activities at universities around the country. He returned to Michigan Agricultural College after the war. In 1922, he coached football at the Northern Branch of the College of Agriculture in Davis, California, where he compiled a 3–4–2 record.

Brewer returned to Missouri in 1923 and was named athletic director and a professor of physical education. His second tenure as athletic director lasted until 1935. During these twelve years of leadership, he helped oversee the construction of Brewer Fieldhouse, which was named for him on February 8, 1930. Brewer also coached the Missouri Tigers baseball team one final time from 1933 to 1934 and finished with a 12–17 record. His final record as Missouri's baseball coach was 69–32–3.

== Later life and death ==
Brewer remained with the university as a professor until his death. He died on April 16, 1953, at the age of 77 in Columbia, Missouri.

== Head coaching record ==
=== Football ===
Year	Team	Overall	Conference	Standing	Bowl/playoffs
Albion Methodists (Michigan Intercollegiate Athletic Association) (1899–1902)
1899	Albion	2–6	1–5		
1900	Albion	6–1–2	5–0–1	1st	
1901	Albion	7–4–1	5–3–1		
1902	Albion	4–6	4–3	3rd	
Albion:		19–17–3	15–11–2		
Michigan Agricultural Aggies (Michigan Intercollegiate Athletic Association) (1903–1907)
1903	Michigan Agricultural	6–1–1	4–1	T–1st	
1904	Michigan Agricultural	8–1	4–1		
1905	Michigan Agricultural	9–2	5–0	1st	
1906	Michigan Agricultural	7–2–2	7–1–1		
1907	Michigan Agricultural	4–2–1	1–0–1	1st	
Michigan Agricultural Aggies (Independent) (1908–1910)
1908	Michigan Agricultural	6–0–2			
1909	Michigan Agricultural	8–1			
1910	Michigan Agricultural	6–1			
Missouri Tigers (Missouri Valley Conference) (1911–1913)
1911	Missouri	2–4–2	0–2–2	5th	
1912	Missouri	5–3	2–3	4th	
1913	Missouri	7–1	4–0	T–1st	
Missouri:		14–8–2	6–5–2		
Michigan Agricultural Aggies (Independent) (1917)
1917	Michigan Agricultural	0–9			
Michigan Agricultural Aggies (Independent) (1919)
1919	Michigan Agricultural	4–4–1			
Michigan Agricultural:		58–23–7	21–3–2		
Cal Aggies (Independent) (1922)
1922	Cal Aggies	3–4–2			
Cal Aggies:		3–4–2			
Total:		94–52–14			
National championship Conference title Conference division title or championship game berth

== See also ==
- List of college football head coaches with non-consecutive tenure
