= Albion High School (Michigan) =

Coordinates: 42.259747°N 84.750756°W

Albion Senior High School
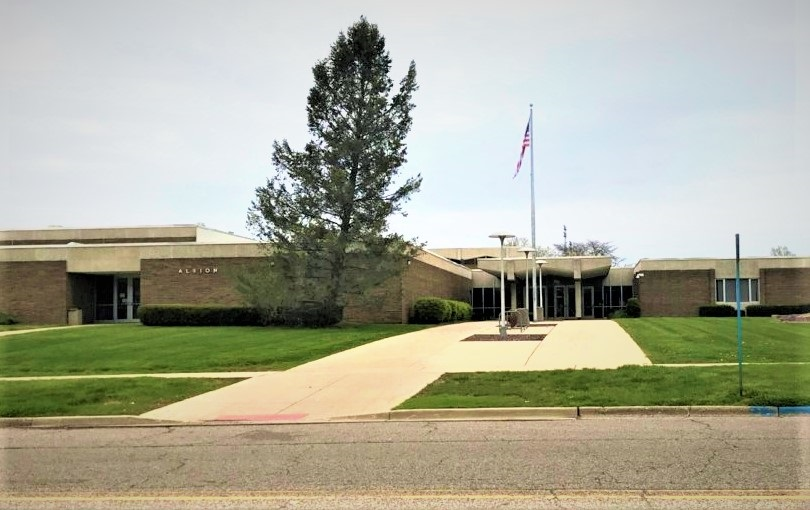

Location
- 255 Watson St. Albion, Michigan 49224

Information
- School type: Public
- Founded: 1967
- Closed: 2013
- School district: Albion Public Schools
- School number: 2602070
- Principal: Derrick Crum
- Grades: 9-12
- Language: English
- Colors: Red and white
- Mascot: Wildcat
- Team name: Wildcats

Albion Senior High School was a secondary school in Albion, Michigan, that served students in grades 9–12. It was a part of Albion Public Schools. As of 2006, the school principal was Debra Swartz. Albion was known for its strong boys' basketball and track and field programs. The school board announced on June 11, 2013, that all Albion High School students would attend Marshall High School starting in the fall of 2013. The decision to close Albion Senior High School was made because of a $1.1 million deficit.The school was later adopted by Marshall Public schools and repurposed into "Marshall Alternative Highschool" meant for students with behavioral or educational challenges. As of 2025 Albion High still stands under the name of "Marshall opportunity highschool" The majority of the schools interior remains unused due to low attendance and short funding.
