= 1899 Michigan Agricultural Aggies football team =

American college football season

1899 Michigan Agricultural Aggies football
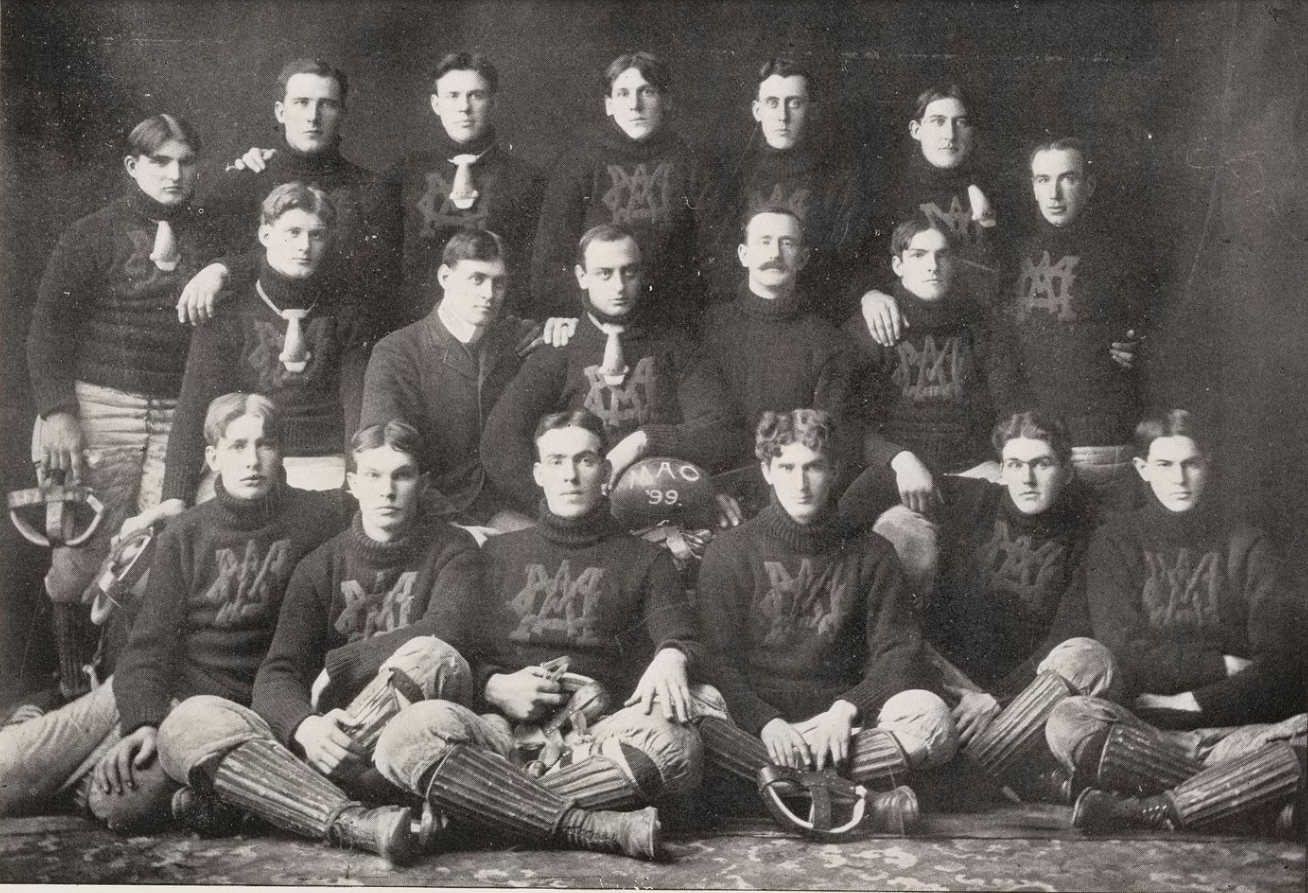
- Conference: Michigan Intercollegiate Athletic Association
- Record: 2–4–1 (1–2–1 MIAA)
- Head coach: Charles Bemies (1st season)
- Captain: Ellis W. Ranney

The 1899 Michigan Agricultural Aggies football team represented Michigan Agricultural College (MAC)—now known as Michigan State University—as a member of the Michigan Intercollegiate Athletic Association (MIAA) during the 1899 college football season. In their first year under head coach Charles Bemies, the Aggies compiled an overall record of 2–4–1 with a mark of 1–2–1 in conference play.

== Schedule ==
Date	Opponent	Site	Result	Source
September 29	at Notre Dame*	Cartier Field; Notre Dame, IN (rivalry)	L 0–40	
October 7	at Detroit Athletic Club*	Detroit, MI	L 6–16	
October 14	Kalamazoo	East Lansing, MI	L 6–10	
October 21	at Alma	Alma, MI	T 11–11	
November 4	Hillsdale	East Lansing, MI	Cancelled	
November 11	at Michigan State Normal	Ypsilanti, MI	W 18–0	
November 25	at Olivet	Olivet, MI	L 17–18	
November 30	DePauw*	East Lansing, MI	W 23–6	
*Non-conference game
