= 1901 Michigan Agricultural Aggies football team =

American college football season

1901 Michigan Agricultural Aggies football
- Conference: Michigan Intercollegiate Athletic Association
- Record: 3–4–1 (3–3–1 MIAA)
- Head coach: George Denman (1st season)
- Captain: Albert H. Case
- Home stadium: College Field

The 1901 Michigan Agricultural Aggies football team represented Michigan Agricultural College (MAC)—now known as Michigan State University—as a member of the Michigan Intercollegiate Athletic Association (MIAA) during the 1901 college football season. In their first year under head coach George Denman, the Aggies compiled am overall record of 3–4–1 record with a mark of and 3–3–1 in conference play, and outscored opponents by a total of 120 to 94. The team played home games at College Field in East Lansing, Michigan.

== Schedule ==
Date	Opponent	Site	Result	Attendance	Source
September 28	at Alma	Alma, MI	L 5–6		
October 5	Hillsdale	College Field; East Lansing, MI	W 22–0		
October 12	at Albion	Albion, MI	W 11–0		
October 19	at Detroit Athletic Club*	Detroit, MI	L 0–33		
October 26	Kalamazoo	College Field; East Lansing, MI	W 42–0		
November 2	Albion	College Field; East Lansing, MI	T 17–17	1,000	
November 16	at Kalamazoo	Kalamazoo, MI	L 5–15		
November 28	Olivet	College Field; East Lansing, MI	L 18–23		
*Non-conference game
