= 1897 Michigan Agricultural Aggies football team =

American college football season

1897 Michigan Agricultural Aggies football
- Conference: Michigan Intercollegiate Athletic Association
- Record: 4–2–1 (1–1–1 MIAA)
- Head coach: Henry Keep (1st season)
- Captain: Walton K. Brainard

The 1897 Michigan Agricultural Aggies football team represented Michigan Agricultural College (MAC)—now known as Michigan State University—as a member of the Michigan Intercollegiate Athletic Association (MIAA) during the 1897 college football season. The Aggies compiled a 4–2–1 record and outscored opponents 146 to 106.

The 1897 season was the first in which the MAC football team had a coach. Henry Keep, an engineering student who had transferred from the University of Michigan, was the first coach. The 1897 season also featured the first installment of the Michigan State–Notre Dame football rivalry. Notre Dame won the game at South Bend, Indiana, by 34 to 6 score. Fullback Wells scored a touchdown for the Aggies.

During the 1897 season, MAC also played two games each against nearby Olivet College and Alma College. The Aggies defeated Alma in both games and secured one win and one tie against Olivet. A game against Michigan State Normal School (later Eastern Michigan University) was cancelled, because MAC accused the Normal School of fielding a team that was "not made up entirely of college men."

== Schedule ==
Date	Opponent	Site	Result	Source
September 25	Lansing High School*	Lansing, MI	W 28–0	
October 2	Olivet	Lansing, MI	W 26–6	
October 9	Kalamazoo	Lansing, MI	L 0–28	
October 16	at Olivet	Olivet, MI	T 18–18	
October 30	at Alma*	Alma, MI	W 30–16	
November 6	Alma*	Lansing, MI	W 38–4	
November 25	at Notre Dame*	Brownson Hall field; Notre Dame, IN (rivalry)	L 6–34	
*Non-conference game
