= Henry Keep (American football) =

American football coach (1872–1965)

Biographical details
- Born: July 19, 1872; Troy, New York, U.S.
- Died: December 1965 (aged 93); Union County, New Jersey, U.S.
- Education: Michigan Agricultural

Coaching career (HC unless noted)
- 1897–1898: Michigan Agricultural

Head coaching record
- Overall: 8–5–1

Henry Keep (July 19, 1872 – December 1965) was an American college football and track and field coach. He served as the first head football coach at Michigan Agricultural College, now known as Michigan State University, from 1897 to 1898, compiling a record of 8–5–1. He served as the school's football and track coach while also attending the college as an engineering student. Keep was a student at the University of Michigan during the 1893–94 academic year before transferring to Michigan Agricultural. As of 1901, he was working for the George Fuller & Co. in New York. Keep and his wife, Esther Maude Durgin had a daughter, Margaret in 1914 in Bellefonte, Pennsylvania. He also later worked for the Carnegie Steel Company in Pittsburgh.

== Head coaching record ==
| Year | Team | Overall | Conference | Standing | Bowl/playoffs |
|---|---|---|---|---|---|
Michigan Agricultural Aggies (Michigan Intercollegiate Athletic Association) (1897–1898)
| 1897 | Michigan Agricultural | 4–2–1 | 1–1–1 | | |
| 1898 | Michigan Agricultural | 4–3 | 4–1 | 3rd | |
| Michigan Agricultural: | | 8–5–1 | 5–2–1 | | |
| Total: | | 8–5–1 | | | |
