= Marshall Public Schools =

School district in Michigan

Address
- 100 E. Green St. Marshall, Calhoun, Michigan, 49068; United States

District information
- Grades: Pre-Kindergarten-12
- Superintendent: Rebecca Jones
- Schools: 7
- Budget: $43,247,000 2022-2023 expenditures
- NCES District ID: 2622970

Students and staff
- Students: 2,598 (2024-2025)
- Teachers: 163.35 (on an FTE basis) (2024-2025)
- Staff: 322.47 FTE (2024-2025)
- Student–teacher ratio: 15.9 (2024-2025)

Other information
- Website: www.marshallpublicschools.org

Marshall Public Schools is a public school district in Michigan. In Calhoun County, it serves Albion, Marshall, and parts of the townships of Albion, Convis, Eckford, Fredonia, Lee, Marengo, Marshall, and Sheridan. In Jackson County, it serves parts of Concord Township and Parma Township.

== History ==
The current Marshall High School opened in fall 1971 and was designed by Louis C. Kingscott and Associates. The former Marshall High School, built in 1929, then became the district's middle school. Its architect was Warren S. Holmes. There has been a high school in Marshall since at least 1873.

In January 1908, responding to vandalism by unknown students at Marshall High School, school administrators cancelled all boys athletics. The guilty boys confessed a few days later, and sports except for track were reinstated. Later that month, the girls basketball team won the state championship.

Harrington Elementary is planned for replacement as part of the bond issue passed in 2024.

=== Annexation of Albion Public Schools ===
Albion High School, in a neighboring town, closed at the end of the 2012-2013 school year, as Albion was in a financial crisis. Marshall Public Schools agreed to take Albion Public School's high school students.

Deindustrialisation and declining population in Albion, declining enrollment due to Michigan's Schools of Choice program, in which Albion students could go elsewhere, and poor leadership by the administration and school board were cited as reasons for the district's collapse in revenue. As Albion Public Schools began the 2015-2016 school year, enrollment had declined to 454 students and the district was $3.1 million in debt. During that school year, it began sending students in grades six through eight to Marshall Public Schools.

In 2016, voters in Albion Public Schools voted for their school district to be annexed by Marshall Public Schools. Although the districts are now combined, separate boundaries are maintained for certain taxation purposes. Because voters chose annexation rather than dissolution, taxation to pay down the district's debt was kept to businesses and commercial property owners rather than all property owners.

=== History of Albion Public Schools ===
Albion High School opened in fall 1966. Annexation of six rural school districts to Albion in 1965 resulted in the need for a new high school, but construction bonds were not enough to cover its rising cost. Resulting lawsuits delayed the construction of the school. After its closure, it became Marshall Opportunity High School, an alternative high school.

Albion High School replaced a previous high school, dedicated in 1928, and also known as Washington Gardner High School. When its successor building opened, Gardner High became Gardner Junior High.

Prior to the use of Gardner High, the high school was housed in a smaller building. In the 1921 yearbook, the editors complained, "The present building is the remodeling of an old one, constructed in 1870. It was designed to accommodate 350 pupils... We now have 600 pupils enrolled in the building... The State Law requires physical education for all students in the public schools. We have been compelled very largely to ignore this requirement because of lack of gymnasium." The first graded school in Albion was established in 1867 and the first high school class graduated in 1878.

Albion's Central School was the basis for Gardner High. It was built in stages beginning in 1885. Additions were built in 1893, 1906, 1922 and 1926. One source states that the Central School was originally built in 1870 and renovated in 1906. The high school wing was built in 1922 and dedicated in 1923. A fire on December 30, 1926 affected the 1906 section. Being made of wood, it was considered a danger, so much of the building was rebuilt in 1928, incorporating the 1922 and 1926 sections and only a small part of the 1906 section. At that time it was renamed William Gardner High School.

== Schools ==
Schools in Marshall Public Schools district
School	Address	Notes
Marshall High School	701 N. Marshall Avenue, Marshall	Grades 9-12. Built 1971.
Marshall Opportunity High School	225 E Watson Street, Albion	Grades 9-12. Alternative high school. Built 1966.
Marshall Middle School	100 E. Green Street, Marshall	Grades 6-8. Built 1929.
Gordon Elementary	400 North Gordon Street, Marshall	Grades PreK-5. Built 1951.
Harrington Elementary	100 S Clark Street, Albion	Grades PreK-5. Built 1955.
Hughes Elementary	103 West Hughes Street, Marshall	Grades PreK-5. Built 1959.
Walters Elementary	705 North Marshall Avenue, Marshall	Grades PreK-5. Built 2002.
