= Douglas V. Steere =

American philosopher, theologian, translator (1901–1995)

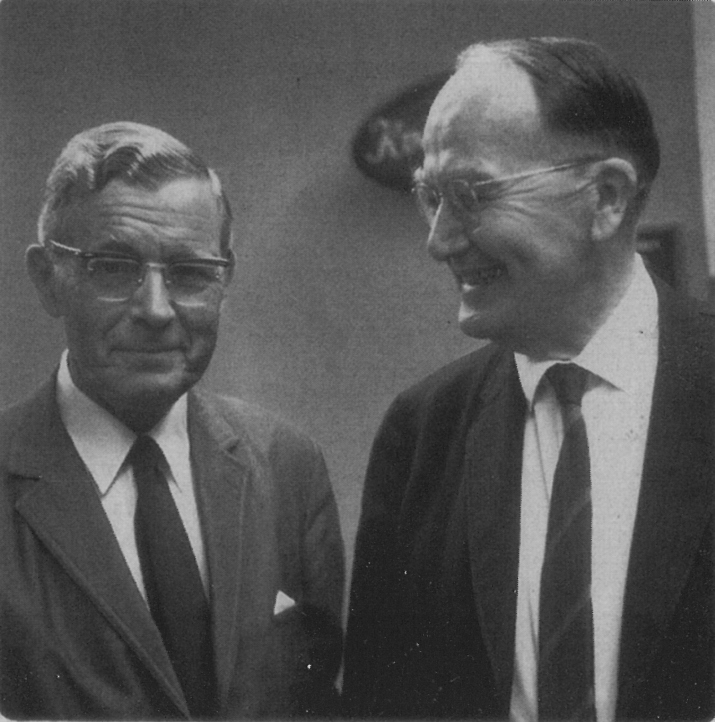
Douglas V. Steere (right) with the Finnish sociologist Heikki Waris in the 1950s.

Douglas Van Steere (August 31, 1901 – February 6, 1995) was an American Quaker ecumenist.

== Biography ==
He served as a professor of philosophy at Haverford College from 1928 to 1964 and visiting professor of theology at Union Theological Seminary from 1961 to 1962. Steere organized Quaker post-war relief work in Finland, Norway and Poland, was invited to participate as an ecumenical observer in the Second Vatican Council and co-founded the Ecumenical Institute of Spirituality. He authored, edited, translated and wrote introductions for many books on Quakerism, as well as other religions and philosophy.

Steere was an undergraduate at Michigan State University, received a Ph.D. from Harvard University in 1931, and was a Rhodes scholar at Oxford University, receiving degrees from Oxford in 1927 and 1954. He corresponded often with Thomas Merton, a popular Trappist monk.

In 1987, he was awarded the Decoration of Knight 1st Class of the White Rose of Finland, in recognition of his post-war relief work in that country.

== Bibliography ==
- Prayer and worship, 1938
- On beginning from within, 1943
- Doors into life, 1948
- Purity of Heart, by Søren Kierkegaard, transl., 1938, 1948
- Time to spare, 1949
- On listening to another, 1955
- Work and contemplation, 1957
- Dimensions of prayer, 1962
- Spiritual Counsel and Letters of Baron Friedrich von Hugel, Edited with an Introduction, 1964
- God's irregular: Arthur Shearly Cripps: a Rhodesian epic 1973
- Together in Solitude, 1982
- Quaker Spirituality: Selected Writings, ed., preface by Elizabeth Gray Vining, 1983
