= Charles Bemies =

American sports coach and minister (1867–1948)

Biographical details
- Born: March 19, 1867; Northfield, Vermont, U.S.
- Died: August 10, 1948 (aged 81); Minneapolis, Minnesota, U.S.

Coaching career (HC unless noted)

Football
- 1890–1893: Geneva
- 1899–1900: Michigan Agricultural

Basketball
- 1892–1894: Geneva
- 1899–1901: Michigan Agricultural

Baseball
- 1900–1901: Michigan Agricultural

Head coaching record
- Overall: 3–8–1 (football); 5–2 (basketball); 4–10 (baseball)

Charles Otis Bemies (March 19, 1867 – August 10, 1948) was an American football, basketball, and baseball coach and Presbyterian minister. He became acquainted with James Naismith while studying at Springfield College (then known as the International Young Men's Christian Association Training School) in the late 1880s. While serving as the athletic director at Geneva College, he organized the first college basketball team in 1892. He graduated from the Western Theological Seminary and was ordained as a Presbyterian minister in 1897. From 1899 to 1901, he served as the first basketball and second football coach at Michigan Agricultural College (now known as Michigan State University). After retiring from coaching, Bemies served for many years as a Presbyterian minister and evangelist in rural Pennsylvania. He was also active with YMCA, serving with that organization in Russia in 1918 and in South Dakota in the early 1920s. Bemies lived in Minneapolis, Minnesota, in his later years and died there in 1948. He was posthumously inducted into the Beaver County Hall of Fame in 1992.

== Early years ==
Bemies was born in Vermont in 1867. His father, James Otis Bemies, was a tinsmith who was born in Maine. His mother, Ellen Medora (Brigham) Bemies, was a native of Vermont. At the time of the 1870 United States census, Bemies was living in Randolph, Vermont, with his parents and an older brother, William H. Bemies (age 5). At the time of the 1880 United States census, Bemies was living in Springfield, Massachusetts, with his parents and two brothers, William H. Bemies (age 16) and James F. Bemies (age 7).

== Early YMCA work and Springfield College ==
Bemies became involved in the work of YMCA early in his life. He worked for YMCA in Burlington, Iowa, for two years. In the late 1880s, he attended the International YMCA Training School (now known as Springfield College) in Springfield, Massachusetts. While studying at Springfield, Bemies became acquainted with James Naismith, the inventor of basketball, who was a physical education teacher at the school. Some accounts state that Bemies was a protégé of Naismith while at Springfield. One biographical account indicates that Bemies was also a teacher at YMCA College in Springfield for one year.

== Geneva College ==
In 1889, Bemies accepted a position as the athletic director and head of the Department of Physical Culture at Geneva College, a Christian liberal arts college in Beaver Falls, Pennsylvania, north of Pittsburgh. He held that position from 1889 to 1894. In 1889, he organized the school's Athletic Association. He also organized a YMCA program at Geneva. As one book notes, "In the fall of 1890, Prof. Bemies organized a 'Young Men's Christian Association,' which continues as an educative factor in the religious life of students."

Bemies organized the football program at Geneva College in 1890 and served as the coach, captain and a player at the halfback and center positions from 1890 to 1893. The 1890 Geneva football team played only one game, losing to Western University of Pennsylvania by a score of 10 to 4. In 1891, Bemies led the team to an expanded six-game schedule in which the "Covies" (as the team was known at the time) compiled a 4–2 record and outscored opponents by a cumulative total of 126 to 78. In 1892, Bemies led the team to a 3–3 record. He led the team again in 1893 to a record of 3–2. During his four years with the program, the Geneva football team compiled an overall record of 10–8.

Bemies is best known for his role as a pioneer of college basketball. In 1892, after witnessing an exhibition basketball game arranged by Naismith in Springfield, Bemies formed the first college basketball team at Geneva College. Under Bemies' guidance, Geneva College became the first college in the United States to field a basketball team. Interviewed in 2010, Ian Naismith, a basketball historian and the grandson of the sport's inventor, sought to settle disputing claims as to which college was the first to introduce basketball. Naismith said, "My grandfather considered Geneva to be the birthplace of college basketball, and how can anybody argue with him? If you say anything differently, you're calling my grandfather, my father, and me, liars."

Records are inconsistent as to the date of the first Geneva College basketball game. One account indicates that Bemies staged basketball games at Geneva "in the early months of 1892." Another account suggests that a report on gymnasium football in the February 1892 edition of the college newspaper, the Geneva Cabinet, may refer to the newly developed game of basketball. The newspaper account from February 1892 reported: "Football in the gym is a popular mode of exercise at present. Some severe knocks are received, but in the excitement, they are hardly noticed." In December 1892, the same newspaper reported: "Basketball is quite a go in the gym now. It suits very well to take the place of football for those who love a rough and tumble game." Several sources are in agreement that, in April 1893, Geneva's basketball team played a game against a YMCA team from nearby Brighton, Pennsylvania. According to the college's current web site, "Geneva first played in collegiate competition on April 8, 1893 using peach baskets as goals, defeating the New Brighton YMCA 3 - 0." However, a history of the college published in 1908 notes that, "Basket Ball was not introduced by a regularly organized team until the fall of 1897." In a 1972 article, J. Vale Downie wrote that "interest in the game lapsed with the departure of Professor Bemies," and it was not until 1897 the sport was revived at Geneva.

Bemies was trained as gymnast and also instructed Geneva College students in fencing, boxing and wrestling. He also played at first base for Geneva's baseball team in 1892. In an 1892 report, Geneva's Board of Trustees wrote of Bemies:

"Strong inducements to leave us have been held out to Prof. O.C. [sic] Bemies of the department of physical culture. The Board could ill afford to keep him; and still less could it afford to lose him. He is a master in the work of physical culture, and has far greater worth, to us, for the culture of the soul. Prof. Bemies is a thoroughly conscientious and consistent Christian, outspoken in his opposition to dancing, card playing, theater going, tobacco using, and all such degrading and demoralizing habits, which are so ensnaring to students. Arrangements have been made by which he will be with us next year."

== Western Theological Seminary ==
After leaving Geneva College, Bemies enrolled at the Western Theological Seminary in Allegheny, Pennsylvania. He graduated in 1897 and was ordained as a Presbyterian minister that same year. Bemies also studied at The Graduate Divinity School at the University of Chicago.

== Allegheny Athletic Association ==
While in his first year at the Western Theological Seminary in 1894, Bemies played center for the Allegheny Athletic Association football team. The Pittsburgh Chronicle Telegraph noted that he stood 6 feet (1.83 m) tall, weighed 170 pounds (77 kg) and was "rated one of the strongest centers in this section". In the team's third and deciding game against rival Pittsburgh Athletic Club for the 1894 local championship, Bemies was controversially benched in favor of Archibald Stevenson, a ringer brought in from the Chicago Athletic Association. Stevenson dominated the center of the line as Allegheny won 30–4.

== Michigan Agricultural College ==
Bemies served as the second head football coach (and first professional football coach) at Michigan Agricultural College, now known as Michigan State University, from 1899 to 1900, compiling a record of 3–10–1. According to one account, "When Michigan State began playing football in 1896, the game was considered such a rowdy affair that the college fathers demanded that a minister handle the team to keep it within decent bounds. Thus the Rev. Charles O. Bemies became the school's first coach."

Bemies was also the first head basketball coach at Michigan Agricultural from 1899 to 1901, tallying a mark of 5–2, and the head coach of Michigan Agricultural's baseball team from 1900 to 1901, where his record was 4–10. According to one history of Michigan State University, Bemies was asked to resign after the poor showing of the football team in 1900: "The football team's poor performance in 1900, which ended with a 23–0 defeat by Alma, led the athletic association to ask for Bemies's resignation. Although the players saw Bemies as a 'good man,' they refused to play for him after the season ended."

== Pastor and evangelist ==
After retiring from coaching, Bemies worked for two years as a country pastor in western Pennsylvania. He next served for 16 years as the pastor of the Presbyterian church in McClellandtown, Pennsylvania, a rural community located about 75 miles south of Pittsburgh. He remained at McClellandtown until the outbreak of World War I, when he left to serve as a chaplain. He also became prominent in Prohibition politics and briefly entered the newspaper business. One of his efforts as the pastor in McClellandtown was the construction of the "Brotherhood Building," a 72' by 42' structure including a gymnasium where the local boys played basketball, a kitchen, and an auditorium. In 1913, Bemies wrote an article on his experiences as a rural pastor that was published in a magazine called "Rural Manhood." He also wrote articles promoting issues such as good roads, better schools and scientific agriculture as means to promote the advancement of rural life.

In 1909, his presbytery sought to remove Bemies from his position at the church in McClellandtown, but he continued to serve when his congregation refused to accept any other pastor. Bemies later wrote about the circumstances leading to the attempt to remove him as pastor:

"Our greatest drawback in the church work was the presence of several exceedingly active gossips and trouble makers. After four years of patient endurance the success of the work demanded that the practice stop, so we were forced to suspend a sister who was addicted to the habit. She immediately gathered on her side the other trouble makers, including the church boss and a few relatives and hangers-on, both in and out of the church. A majority leaders of Presbytery secured enough votes to forcibly remove me by vote from the official pastorate of the church against the unanimous vote and the protest of the congregation upholding me. It made no difference with the work, for I went right on just the same as before under the employment of the church as their supply."

During the 1910s, he also worked as an evangelist in various locations in Pennsylvania.

== Europe and South Dakota ==
In December 1917, Bemies was appointed to a YMCA commission to Russia as "an ambassador of American country life to the new republic." In a passport application dated December 21, 1917, Bemies wrote that the purpose of his trip was "YMCA Work" and that he would be traveling to "Russia entering Russia at Vladivostok and passing through Japan."

Bemies remained in Europe from 1918 to 1919 where he was involved in war reconstruction work. He was also a field lecturer at the A.E.F. University in Beaune, France.

After World War I, Bemies moved to South Dakota where he continued his work with YMCA and as a clergyman. While living in South Dakota, Bemies also held the position of State Survey Supervisor for the Interchurch World Movement.

== Family and later years ==
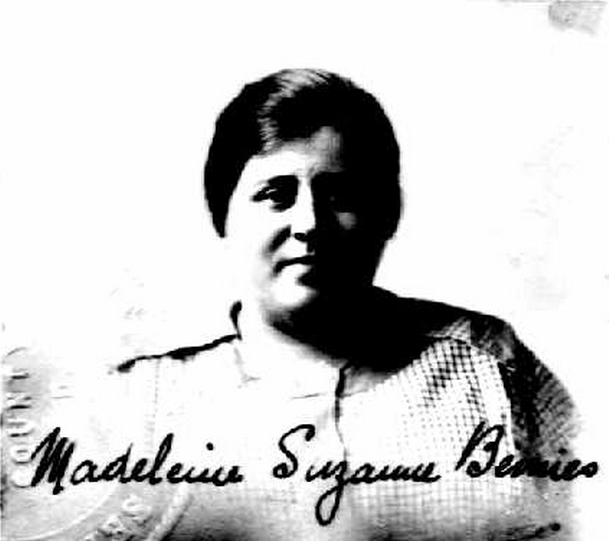
Bemies' second wife, Madeleine, in 1920.

Bemies was married to Lina Stracke (born 1863 in Iowa) in May 1891. They had two sons, Carl Louis Bemies (1892–1966) and Clifton S. Bemies (born May 1899). At the time of the 1900 United States census, Bemies was living with his wife and sons in Meridian, Michigan, near East Lansing.

At the time of the 1910 United States census, Bemies was living with his wife, Lina, and two sons in German Township, Fayette County, Pennsylvania. Bemies' first wife, Lina, died in 1913.

In May 1918, Bemies met Madeleine Suzanne Lévy while in France. Madeleine was born in France in 1895, and they were married in France in October 1918. At the time of the 1920 United States census, Bemies was living in Brookings, South Dakota, with Madeleine and his two sons from his first marriage.

At the time of the 1930 United States census, Bemies was living with his wife, Madeleine, in Minneapolis, and his occupation was recorded as Presbyterian minister.

Bemies died in August 1948 after a short illness at the Minneapolis General Hospital in Hennepin County, Minnesota.

Bemies was posthumously inducted into the Beaver County Hall of Fame in 1992.

== Head coaching record ==
=== Football ===
Year	Team	Overall	Conference	Standing	Bowl/playoffs
Michigan Agricultural Aggies (Michigan Intercollegiate Athletic Association) (1899–1900)
1899	Michigan Agricultural	2–4–1	1–2–1		
1900	Michigan Agricultural	1–4	1–3		
Michigan Agricultural:		3–8–1	2–5–2		
Total:		3–8–1			
