= George Denman (American football) =

American educator, athletic director, sports coach, (1874–1952)

Biographical details
- Born: March 23, 1874; New York, U.S.
- Died: June 4, 1952 (aged 78); Auburn, New York, U.S.

Playing career

Football
- 1896–1897: Williams
- 1899: Columbia
- Positions: Fullback, halfback

Coaching career (HC unless noted)

Football
- 1899: Auburn HS (NY)
- 1900: Central (KY)
- 1901–1902: Michigan Agricultural

Basketball
- 1901–1903: Michigan Agricultural

Baseball
- 1902–1903: Michigan Agricultural

Administrative career (AD unless noted)
- 1901–1902: Michigan Agricultural
- 1903–1910: Centenary Collegiate Institute (NJ)

Head coaching record
- Overall: 11–11–2 (college football); 11–0 (college basketball); 9–15–1 (college baseball)

George Edward Denman (March 23, 1874 – June 4, 1952) was an American educator, athletics administrator, and football, basketball, and baseball coach. He served as the third head football coach at Michigan Agricultural College, now known as Michigan State University, from 1901 to 1902, compiling a record of 7–9–1. Denman was also the second head basketball coach at Michigan Agricultural from 1901 to 1903, tallying a mark of 11–0, and the head coach of Michigan Agricultural's baseball team from 1902 to 1903, where his record was 9–15–1.

== Biography ==
Denman was born in March 1874 in New York. His father, Edmond Denman, was an immigrant from England who worked as a day laborer. His mother, Maria Denman, was a native of New York. He had an older brother, William, born in March 1873.

Denman began his higher education during the 1893–94 academic year at Union College in Schenectady, New York. He later attended Williams College in Williamstown, Massachusetts. He was a member of the senior class during the 1897–98 academic year, and received his degree in 1898.

In 1899, Denman coached the football team at Auburn High School in his hometown of Auburn, New York. That fall, he also played as a halfback for the 1899 Columbia Blue and White football team. The following year, he coached football at Central University in Richmond, Kentucky.

In 1901, Denman was hired as the athletic director at Denman served at Michigan Agricultural College—now known as Michigan State University. He was the third head football coach at, from 1901 to 1902, compiling a record of 7–9–1. Denman was also the second head basketball coach at Michigan Agricultural from 1901 to 1903, tallying a mark of 11–0, and the head coach of Michigan Agricultural's baseball team from 1902 to 1903, where his record was 9–15–1.

In 1905, he was instructor of French and Latin at the Central University in Lexington, Kentucky.

From 1903 to 1910, Denman was the athletic director and headmaster of the Centenary Collegiate Institute in Hackettstown, New Jersey.

In 1913, Denman was an instructor of Latin at the Mackenzie School in Dobbs Ferry, New York.

Denman was married to Emma Blanche Babbitt, the daughter of a physician and surgeon from Auburn, New York.

In September 1918, Denman wrote in a draft registration card that he was a resident of Auburn, New York. He listed his present occupation as the athletic director and a teacher at the Williston Seminary (now known as the Williston Northampton School) at Easthampton, Massachusetts. At the time of the 1920 United States census, Denman was living in Easthampton with his wife, Blanche. His occupation was listed as a professor at a seminary.

By 1930, Denman had moved to Pottstown, Pennsylvania, where he was a teacher at The Hill School. As of 1932, Denman and his wife were living in Pottstown. His wife, Blanche, died on March 17, 1948. Denman died on June 4, 1952, in Auburn. He and his wife are buried at Fort Hill Cemetery in Auburn, New York.

== Head coaching record ==
=== College football ===
Year	Team	Overall	Conference	Standing	Bowl/playoffs
Central Colonels (Independent) (1900)
1900	Central	4–2–1			
Central:		4–2–1			
Michigan Agricultural Aggies (Michigan Intercollegiate Athletic Association) (1901–1902)
1901	Michigan Agricultural	3–4–1	3–3–1		
1902	Michigan Agricultural	4–5	2–2	4th	
Michigan Agricultural:		7–9–1	5–5–1		
Total:		11–11–2			
