= Michigan School for the Deaf =

School for deaf children in Flint, Michigan, US

Coordinates: 43.0058°N 83.7006°W

Location
- 1235 W. Court Street; Flint, Michigan 48503; United States

Information
- Type: Public
- Established: 1848
- Grades: PreK–12
- Mascot: Tartars
- Website: www.michiganschoolforthedeaf.org

Michigan School for the Deaf is a public K–12 school for deaf children in Flint, Michigan. It is under the Michigan State Board of Education.

== History ==
The Michigan Legislature established the Michigan Asylum for Educating the Deaf and Dumb and the Blind in 1848 with Governor of Michigan Ransom signing the law establishing it on April 3 of that year. Prior to that time there was no systematic educational program in the state for educating blind and deaf students. In 1867 it became the Michigan Asylum to the Michigan Institution for Educating the Deaf and Dumb and the Blind due to a new law. The blind and deaf schools became separate in 1879 and the name Michigan School for the Deaf came into effect in 1887, while the Michigan School for the Blind moved to Lansing. In 1937 the Michigan State Board of Education assumed responsibility for the school. In 1994 the School for the Blind moved back to Flint with MSD when the Lansing campus closed.

== Campus ==
Michigan School for the Deaf Superintendent's Cottage is a historic site.

The school has dormitory facilities.

== Student body ==
In 2009 the school had about 50–60 students at the high school level.

== Athletics ==
The sports team is the Tartars. The high school American football team stopped practicing after 1985. In 2008 the management of the school began planning how to re-establish the team as having one could boost morale and attract students, and there was interest among the student body. The team was re-established the following year. Nikki Coleman, the athletic director, stated that the percentage of high school students interested in American football was 95%. The school aimed to have a team of about 15–20 students. The school formerly had an eight man football team, however, this shut down in 2019.

== See also ==
- Michigan School for the Blind
