= Old College Field =

Sports venue in East Lansing, Michigan

Coordinates: 42°43′56.8″N 84°29′23.4″W

- Interactive map of Old College Field
- Location: East Lansing, Michigan
- Owner: Michigan State University
- Operator: Michigan State University

Construction
- Groundbreaking: 1900
- Opened: April 18, 1902

Tenants
- Michigan State Spartans baseball team, men's and women's soccer teams, softball team

Old College Field is an area on the campus of Michigan State University in East Lansing, Michigan. The school broke ground in 1900 to provide a place for the varsity baseball team to play. Today, the area includes facilities for baseball, soccer, and softball. It is located on a floodplain on the inside of a bend in the Red Cedar River. The "New Life for Old College Field" campaign, which began in 2006, was to enhance the sports programs which played on the Field.

== Baseball ==
The land was originally purchased by the University for a field where the baseball team could play home games. The Aggies broke ground in 1900, and the first baseball game was played April 18, 1902 against Michigan. The baseball portion of the field was renamed John H. Kobs Field in 1969 in honor of longtime coach John Kobs. In 2009, the baseball park was renamed Drayton McLane Baseball Stadium at John H. Kobs Field in honor of Michigan State alumni Drayton McLane, whose donation in 2008 allowed for an extensive renovation of the facility.

== Football ==
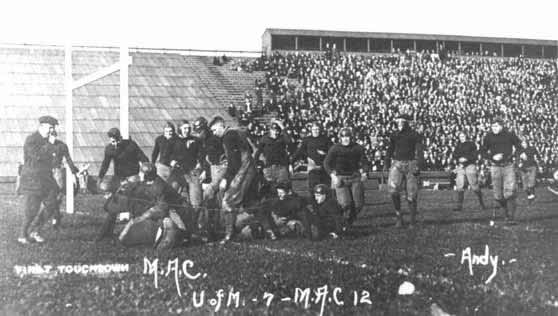
MAC vs UM football in 1913

The football team used the Field from 1902 to 1923 before College Field opened.

== Men's and women's soccer ==
Men's and women's soccer have used Old College Field since the programs were created. Today, they play at the Demartin Soccer Complex which was created in 2008 from a gift of $750,000 from the DeMartin family of Summitt, N.J., to renovate Old College Field's soccer stadium.

== Softball ==
The softball team has used Old College field since its inception. The softball facilities were renamed Secchia Stadium in recognition of a $1 million gift from alumnus Ambassador Peter F. Secchia. The new facilities were opened in 2011.
