= 2023 Michigan Intercollegiate Athletic Association football season =

- Sport: Football
- Teams: 7
- Champion: Alma

Football seasons
- 2022 2024

2023 Michigan Intercollegiate Athletic Association football standings
	Conf.			Overall
Team	W		L	W		L
No. 6 Alma $^	6	–	0	12	–	1
Hope	5	–	1	8	–	2
Trine	4	–	2	6	–	4
Albion	3	–	3	7	–	3
Olivet	2	–	4	4	–	6
Kalamazoo	1	–	5	5	–	5
Adrian	0	–	6	1	–	9
$ – Conference champion; ^ – NCAA Division III playoff participant; Rankings from D3Football.com

The 2023 Michigan Intercollegiate Athletic Association season was the season of college football played by the seven member schools of the Michigan Intercollegiate Athletic Association (MIAA) as part of the 2023 NCAA Division III football season.

The Alma Scots, in their sixth year under head coach Jason Crouch, compiled a 10–0 record in the regular season and won the program's second consecutive MIAA championship. They advanced to the NCAA Division III Football Championship playoffs, winning in the first and second rounds, but losing to national champion Cortland (41–58) in a quarterfinal match. They averaged 46.8 points per game and outscored opponents by a total of 609 to 259. Quarterback Carter St. John led the team with 3,323 passing yards and won the postseason award as the most valuable player in the conference.

The Hope Flying Dutchmen, led by head coach Peter Stuursma, compiled an 8–2 record (5–1 in conference games) and finished in second place in the MIAA. Running back Chance Strickland was chosen for the All-MIAA team.

== Conference overview ==
Conf. rank	Team	Head coach	Overall record	Conf. record	Points scored	Points against
1	Alma	Jason Couch	12–1	6–0	609	259
2	Hope	Peter Stuursma	8–2	5–1	360	232
3	Trine	Troy Abbs	6–4	4–2	358	304
4	Albion	Travis Rundle	7–3	3–3	322	210
5	Olivet	Dan Musielewicz	4–6	2–4	236	315
6	Kalamazoo	Jamie Zorbo	5–5	1–5	297	341
7	Adrian	Jim Deere	1–9	0–6	191	328

== All-MIAA honors ==
At the end of the regular season in November 2022, the MIAA head coaches voted on individual honors, including the following:

- Most Valuable Player, Offense - Carter St. John, Alma
- Most Valuable Defensive Player - Nick Fannon, Albion
- Pete Schmidt Memorial Scholar Athlete Award - SirQuarius Bell, Olivet

The following players received first-team honors on the 2023 All-MIAA football team:

Offense

- Quarterback - Carter St. John, Alma
- Running back - Chance Strickland, Hope; Dontal Wright, Olivet
- Wide receivers - Kyle Bristow, Albion; Devon Frenchko, Alma; Grant Holtzer, Hope
- Tight end - Nate Webb, Alma
- Offensive line - Dylan Clem, Hope; Alexander Lewis, Trine; Jackson Linback, Trine; Jonathan Sasiela, Adrian; Reese Townsend, Alma

Defense

- Defensive line - Nick Fannon, Albion; Jamon Gibson, Trine; Jerome Roberson, Alma; Hunter Sanderson, Ala
- Linebackers - Eli Jackson, Alma; Cole Luhmann, Hope; Odin sffredine, Alma; Alex Olenik, Albion
- Cornerbacks - Drew Humm, Alma; Larry Platt, Albion
- Safeties - Nick Fegler, Hope; Bryce Fredenburg, Alma

Special teams

- Kicker - Ian Burr, Kalamazoo
- Punter - Chris Bowman, Albion
- Return specialist - Zach Poff, Alma

== Teams ==
=== Alma ===
2023 Alma Scots football

MIAA champion

NCAA Division III quarterfinal, L 41–58 vs. Cortland
- Conference: Michigan Intercollegiate Athletic Association

Ranking
- AFCA: No. 7
- Record: 12–1 (6–0 MIAA)
- Head coach: Jason Couch (6th season)
- Home stadium: Bahlke Field

The 2023 Alma Scots football team represented Alma College as a member of the Michigan Intercollegiate Athletic Association (MIAA) during the 2023 NCAA Division III football season. In their sixth season under head coach Jason Couch, the Scots compiled an 12–1 record (6–0 against conference opponents), won the MIAA championship, and were ranked No. 11 nationally at the end of the regular season. They advanced to the Division III playoffs where they won games in the first and second rounds, but lost to Cortland in the quarterfinals.

The team's statistical leaders included quarterback Carter St. John with 3,323 passing yards, Eddie Williams with 686 rushing yards, Zach Poff with 90 points scored, Devon Frenchko with 1,259 receiving yards, and Odin Soffredine with 104 total tackles.

Date	Opponent	Site	Result	Attendance	Source
September 2	Ohio Northern*	Bahlke Field; Alma, MI	W 52–7	2,463	
September 9	at Manchester*	Spartan Stadium; North Manchester, IN	W 68–0	250	
September 16	Anderson*	Bahlke Field; Alma, MI	W 60–14	1,485	
September 23	at Wittenberg*	Edwards-Maurer Field; Springfield, OH	W 48–28	1,527	
September 30	Trine	Bahlke Field; Alma, MI	W 70–30	2,132	
October 14	at Hope	Ray & Sue Smith Stadium; Holland, MI	W 35–17	2,870	
October 21	Kalamazoo	Bahlke Field; Alma, MI	W 43–10	1,741	
October 28	Olivet	Bahlke Field; Alma, MI	W 41–20	1,859	
November 4	at Adrian	Docking Stadium; Adrian, MI	W 45–24	1,946	
November 11	at Albion	Sprankle-Sprandel; Albion, MI	W 50–14	1,450	
November 18	DePauw	Bahlke Field; Alma, MI	W 32–17	1,975	
November 25	at Mount Union	Kehres Stadium; Alliance, OH	W 24–20	1,785	
December 2	Cortland	Bahlke Field; Alma, MI	L 41–58	2,542	
*Non-conference game

=== Hope ===
2023 Hope Flying Dutchmen football
- Conference: Michigan Intercollegiate Athletic Association
- Record: 8–2 (5–1 MIAA)
- Head coach: Peter Stuursma (7th season)
- Home stadium: Ray & Sue Smith Stadium

The 2023 Hope Flying Dutchmen football team represented Hope College as a member of the Michigan Intercollegiate Athletic Association (MIAA) during the 2023 NCAA Division III football season. In their seventh season under head coach Peter Stuursma, the Dutchmen compiled an 8–2 record (5–1 against conference opponents) and finished in second place in the MIAA.

Date	Opponent	Site	Result	Attendance	Source
September 2	at Aurora*	Spartan Athletic Park; Aurora, IL	L 17–38	1,127	
September 9	Loras*	Ray & Sue Smith Stadium; Holland, MI	W 42–28	2,344	
September 16	Mount St. Joseph*	Ray and Sue Smith Stadium; Holland, MI	W 40–35	2,124	
September 23	Northwestern (MN)*	Ray and Sue Smith Stadium; Holland, MI	W 54–17	1,850	
September 30	at Adrian	Docking Stadium; Adrian, MI	W 30–21	1,294	
October 7	Albion	Ray and Sue Smith Stadium; Holland, MI	W 14–6	1,606	
October 14	Alma	Ray and Sue Smith Stadium; Holland, MI	L 17–35	2,870	
October 21	at Olivet	Cutler Athletic Complex; Olivet, MI	W 45–7	3,215	
October 28	at Kalamazoo	Angell Field; Kalamazoo, MI	W 63–17	985	
November 4	Trine	Ray and Sue Smith Stadium; Holland, MI	W 38–28	2,033	
*Non-conference game

=== Trine ===
2023 Trine Thunder football
- Conference: Michigan Intercollegiate Athletic Association
- Record: 6–4 (4–2 MIAA)
- Head coach: Troy Abbs (9th season)
- Home stadium: Fred Zollner Athletic Stadium

The 2023 Trine Thunder football team represented Trine University as a member of the Michigan Intercollegiate Athletic Association (MIAA) during the 2023 NCAA Division III football season. In their ninth year under head coach Troy Abbs, the Thunder compiled a 6–4 record (4–2 against conference opponents) and finished in third place in the MIAA.

Date	Opponent	Site	Result	Attendance	Source
September 2	at Anderson*	Macholtz Stadium; Anderson, IN	W 61–0	946	
September 9	Rose-Hulman*	Fred Zollner Athletic Stadium; Angola, IN	L 28–30	5,145	
September 16	Franklin*	Fred Zollner Athletic Stadium; Angola, IN	W 58–43	4,165	
September 23	at Hanover*	Alumni Stadium; Hanover, IN	L 14–38	2,957	
September 30	at Alma	Alma, MI	L 30–70	2,132	
October 7	Adrian	Fred Zollner Stadium; Angola, IN	W 34–14	5,312	
October 14	Olivet	Fred Zollner Athletic Stadium; Angola, IN	W 28–14	1,258	
October 21	at Albion	Sprankle-Sprandel; Albion, MI	W 35–28	1,087	
November 4	at Hope	Ray & Sue Smith Stadium; Holland, MI	L 28–38	2,033	
November 11	Kalamazoo	Fred Zollner Athletic Stadium; Angola, IN	W 42–29	5,213	
*Non-conference game

=== Albion ===
2023 Albion Britons football
- Conference: Michigan Intercollegiate Athletic Association
- Record: 7–3 (3–3 MIAA)
- Head coach: Travis Rundle (1st season)
- Home stadium: Sprankle-Sprandel Stadium

The 2023 Albion Britons football team represented Albion College as a member of the Michigan Intercollegiate Athletic Association (MIAA) during the 2023 NCAA Division III football season. In their first season under head coach Travis Rundle, the Britons compiled a 7–3 record (3–3 against conference opponents) and finished third in the MIAA.

Date	Opponent	Site	Result	Attendance	Source
September 2	at Carthage	Art Keller Field; Kenosha, WI	W 41–20	1,050	
September 9	at Bluffton	Alumni Field; Bluffton, OH	W 42–20	600	
September 16	Rose-Hulman	Sprankle-Sprandel Stadium; Albion, MI	W 48–19	2,874	
September 23	Wisconsin-Stevens Point	Sprankle-Sprandel Stadium; Albion, MI	W 30–7	2,019	
September 30	Kalamazoo	Sprankle-Sprandel Stadium; Albion, MI	W 44–17	4,069	
October 7	at Hope	Ray & Sue Smith Stadium; Holland, MI	L 6–14	1,606	
October 21	Trine	Sprankle-Sprandel Stadium; Albion, MI	L 28–35	1,087	
October 28	at Adrian	Docking Stadium; Adrian, MI	W 34–21	342	
November 4	at Olivet	Cutler Athletic Complex; Olivet, MI	W 35–7	1,250	
November 11	Alma	Sprankle-Sprandel Stadium; Albion, MI	L 14–50	1,450	

=== Olivet ===
2023 Olivet Comets football
- Conference: Michigan Intercollegiate Athletic Association
- Record: 4–6 (2–4 MIAA)
- Head coach: Dan Musielewicz (7th season)
- Home stadium: Cutler Field

The 2023 Olivet Comets football team represented The University of Olivet as a member of the Michigan Intercollegiate Athletic Association (MIAA) during the 2023 NCAA Division III football season. In their seventh year under head coach Dan Musielewicz, the Comets compiled a 4–6 record (2–4 against conference opponents), were outscored by a total of 315 to 236, and finished in fifth place in the MIAA.

Date	Opponent	Site	Result	Attendance	Source
September 2	at Franklin*	Faught Stadium; Franklin, IN	W 35–32	1,432	
September 9	at Wooster*	John P. Papp Stadium; Woster, OH	L 22–24	2,795	
September 16	Hanover*	Cutler Field; Olivet, MI	L 17–67	1,905	
September 30	Alfred State*	Cutler Field; Olivet, MI	W 40–19	1,255	
October 7	at Kalamazoo	Angell Field; Kalamazoo, MI	W 42–14	1,000	
October 14	at Trine	Fred Zollner Athletic Stadium; Angola, IN	L 14–28	1,258	
October 21	Hope^{†}	Cutler Fiel; Olivet, MI	L 7–57	3,215	
October 28	at Alma	Bahlke Field; Alma, MI	L 20–41	1,859	
November 4	Albion	Cutler Field; Olivet, MI	L 7–35	1,250	
November 11	Adrian	Cutler Field; Olivet, MI	W 32–10	1,205	
*Non-conference game; ^{†}Homecoming

=== Kalamazoo ===
2023 Kalamazoo Hornets football
- Conference: Michigan Intercollegiate Athletic Association
- Record: 5–5 (1–5 MIAA)
- Head coach: Jamie Zorbo (16th season)
- Home stadium: Angell Field

The 2023 Kalamazoo Hornets football team represented Kalamazoo College as a member of the Michigan Intercollegiate Athletic Association (MIAA) during the 2023 NCAA Division III football season. In their 16th year under head coach Jamie Zorbo, the Hornets compiled a 5–5 record (1–5 in conference games) and finished in sixth place in the MIAA.

Kicker Ian Burr converted nine of twelve field goal attempts, also punted 47 times (including 11 inside the 20), and was named to the All-MIAA team.

Date	Opponent	Site	Result	Attendance	Source
September 2	Oberlin*	Angell Field; Kalamazoo, MI	W 42–10	833	
September 9	at Kenyon*	McBride Field; Gambier, OH	W 48–16	521	
September 16	Defiance*	Angell Field; Kalamazoo, MI	W 42–35	688	
September 30	at Albion	Sprankle-Sprandel; Albion, MI	L 17–44	4,069	
October 7	Olivet^{†}	Angell Field; Kalamazoo, MI	L 14–42		
October 14	Adrian	Angell Field; Kalamazoo, MI	W 45–23	617	
October 21	at Alma	Bahlke Field; Alma, MI	L 10–43	1,741	
October 28	Hope	Angell Field; Kalamazoo, MI	L 17–63	985	
November 3	at Greenville*	Don Stout Field; Greenville, IL	W 33–23	500	
November 11	at Trine	Fred Zollner Athletic Stadium; Angola, IN	L 29–42	5,213	
*Non-conference game; ^{†}Homecoming

=== Adrian ===
2023 Adrian Bulldogs football
- Conference: Michigan Intercollegiate Athletic Association
- Record: 6–4 (3–3 MIAA)
- Head coach: Jim Deere (13th season; first 7 games); Harry Bailey (interim, final 3 games)
- Offensive coordinator: Harry Bailey (9th season)
- Home stadium: Docking Stadium

The 2023 Adrian Bulldogs football team represented Adrian College as a member of the Michigan Intercollegiate Athletic Association (MIAA) during the 2023 NCAA Division III football season. Under head coach Jim Deere and interim head coach Harry Bailey, the Bulldogs compiled a 1–9 record (0–6 against conference opponents) and tied for third place in the MIAA.

Date	Opponent	Site	Result	Attendance	Source
September 2	at Elmhurst*	Langhorst Field; Elmhurst, IL	L 3–14	789	
September 9	Defiance*	Docking Stadium; Adrian, MI	L 17–34	1,293	
September 16	Bluffton*^{†}	Docking Stadium; Adrian, MI	W 23–15	500	
September 23	at Greenville*	Don Stout Field; Greenville, IL	L 35–45	500	
September 30	Hope	Docking Stadium; Adrian, MI	L 21–30	1,294	
October 7	at Trine	Fred Zollner Athletic Stadium; Angola, IN	L 14–34	5,312	
October 14	at Kalamazoo	Angell Field; Kalamazoo, MI	L 23–45	617	
October 18	Albion	Docking Stadium; Adrian, MI	L 21–34	342	
November 4	Alma	Docking Stadium; Adrian, MI	L 24–45	1,946	
November 11	at Olivet	Cutler Athletic Complex; Olivet, MI	L 10–32	1,205	
*Non-conference game; ^{†}Homecoming
