= Adrian Bulldogs football, 2020–present =

American college football seasons

2020–present Adrian Bulldogs football
- Conference: Michigan Intercollegiate Athletic Association
- Head coach: Jim Deere (2011–2023); Harry Bailey (2023); Joe Palka (2024–present)
- Home stadium: Docking Stadium

The Adrian Bulldogs football program, 2020–present represented Adrian College from 2020 to the present in NCAA Division II college football as a member of the Michigan Intercollegiate Athletic Association (MIAA). The team has been led by head coaches Jim Deere (2011–2023), Harry Bailey (2023), and Joe Palka (2024–present). The program played its home games at Docking Stadium in Adrian, Michigan.

== 2020 ==
The 2020 season was cancelled due to the COVID-19 pandemic.

== 2021 ==
2021 Adrian Bulldogs football
- Conference: Michigan Intercollegiate Athletic Association
- Record: 5–5 (3–3 MIAA)
- Head coach: Jim Deere (11th season)
- Offensive coordinator: Harry Bailey (7th season)
- Home stadium: Docking Stadium

2021 Michigan Intercollegiate Athletic Association football standings
	Conf.			Overall
Team	W		L	W		L
No. 25 Albion +^	5	–	1	9	–	2
Hope +	5	–	1	8	–	2
Trine	4	–	2	6	–	4
Olivet	3	–	3	7	–	3
Adrian	3	–	3	5	–	5
Alma	1	–	5	5	–	5
Kalamazoo	0	–	6	1	–	9
$ – Conference champion; ^ – NCAA Division III playoff participant; Rankings from AFCA Poll

The 2021 Adrian Bulldogs football team represented Adrian College as a member of the Michigan Intercollegiate Athletic Association (MIAA) during the 2021 NCAA Division III football season. Under head coach Jim Deere, the Bulldogs compiled a 5–6 record (3–3 against conference opponents) and tied for fourth place in the MIAA.

=== Schedule ===
Date	Opponent	Site	Result	Attendance	Source
September 4	Heidelberg*	Docking Stadium; Adrian, MI	L 20–48	2,950	
September 11	at Hanover*	Alumni Stadium; Hanover, IN	L 14–21	2,248	
September 18	Greenville*^{†}	Docking Stadium; Adrian, MI	W 41–28	4,500	
September 25	at Finlandia*	McAfee Field; Hancock, MI	W 56–6	602	
October 2	at Trine	Fred Zollner Athletic Complex; Angola, IN	L 20–36	5,980	
October 9	Albion	Docking Stadium; Adrian, MI	W 21–7	1,840	
October 16	Alma	Docking Stadium; Adrian, MI	W 36–21	2,006	
October 23	at Hope	Ray & Sue Smith Stadium; Holland, MI	L 7–19	2,510	
November 6	Olivet	Docking Stadium; Adrian, MI	L 28–35	1,856	
November 13	at Kalamazoo	Angell Field; Kalamazoo, MI	W 33–21	561	
*Non-conference game; ^{†}Homecoming

== 2022 ==
2022 Adrian Bulldogs football
- Conference: Michigan Intercollegiate Athletic Association
- Record: 6–4 (3–3 MIAA)
- Head coach: Jim Deere (12th season)
- Offensive coordinator: Harry Bailey (8th season)
- Home stadium: Docking Stadium

2022 Michigan Intercollegiate Athletic Association football standings
	Conf.			Overall
Team	W		L	W		L
No. 18 Alma $^	6	–	0	11	–	1
Albion	5	–	1	9	–	1
Trine	3	–	3	7	–	3
Hope	3	–	3	6	–	4
Adrian	3	–	3	6	–	4
Olivet	1	–	5	5	–	5
Kalamazoo	0	–	6	3	–	7
$ – Conference champion; ^ – NCAA Division III playoff participant; Rankings from AFCA Poll

The 2022 Adrian Bulldogs football team represented Adrian College as a member of the Michigan Intercollegiate Athletic Association (MIAA) during the 2022 NCAA Division III football season. Under head coach Jim Deere, the Bulldogs compiled a 6–4 record (3–3 against conference opponents) and tied for third place in the MIAA.

Date	Opponent	Site	Result	Attendance	Source
September 3	at Heidelberg*	Hoernemann Stadium; Tiffin, OH	L 0–31	2,212	
September 10	Hanover*	Docking Stadium; Adrian, MI	W 33–0	1,854	
September 17	at Bluffton*	Alumni Field; Bluffton, OH	W 58–23	2,500	
September 24	Finlandia*	Docking Stadium; Adrian, MI	W 73–13	2,746	
October 1	at Hope	Ray & Sue Smith Stadium; Holland, MI	W 22–10	1,917	
October 8	Trine	Docking Stadium; Adrian, MI	L 21–27	1,175	
October 15	Kalamazoo	Docking Stadium; Adrian, MI	W 42–17	3,472	
October 29	at Albion	Sprankle-Sprandel; Albion, MI	L 9–37	2,310	
November 5	at Alma	Bahlke Field; Alma, MI	L 10–30	1,700	
November 12	Olivet	Docking Stadium; Adrian, MI	W 28–0	1,057	
*Non-conference game

== 2023 ==
2023 Adrian Bulldogs football
- Conference: Michigan Intercollegiate Athletic Association
- Record: 1–9 (0–6 MIAA)
- Head coach: Jim Deere (13th season; first 7 games); Harry Bailey (interim, final 3 games)
- Offensive coordinator: Harry Bailey (9th season)
- Home stadium: Docking Stadium

2023 Michigan Intercollegiate Athletic Association football standings
	Conf.			Overall
Team	W		L	W		L
No. 6 Alma $^	6	–	0	12	–	1
Hope	5	–	1	8	–	2
Trine	4	–	2	6	–	4
Albion	3	–	3	7	–	3
Olivet	2	–	4	4	–	6
Kalamazoo	1	–	5	5	–	5
Adrian	0	–	6	1	–	9
$ – Conference champion; ^ – NCAA Division III playoff participant; Rankings from D3Football.com

The 2023 Adrian Bulldogs football team represented Adrian College as a member of the Michigan Intercollegiate Athletic Association (MIAA) during the 2023 NCAA Division III football season. Under head coach Jim Deere and interim head coach Harry Bailey, the Bulldogs compiled a 1–9 record (0–6 against conference opponents) and finished in seventh place in the MIAA.

Date	Opponent	Site	Result	Attendance	Source
September 2	at Elmhurst*	Langhorst Field; Elmhurst, IL	L 3–14	789	
September 9	Defiance*	Docking Stadium; Adrian, MI	L 17–34	1,293	
September 16	Bluffton*^{†}	Docking Stadium; Adrian, MI	W 23–15	500	
September 23	at Greenville*	Don Stout Field; Greenville, IL	L 35–45	500	
September 30	Hope	Docking Stadium; Adrian, MI	L 21–30	1,294	
October 7	at Trine	Fred Zollner Athletic Stadium; Angola, IN	L 14–34	5,312	
October 14	at Kalamazoo	Angell Field; Kalamazoo, MI	L 23–45	617	
October 18	Albion	Docking Stadium; Adrian, MI	L 21–34	342	
November 4	Alma	Docking Stadium; Adrian, MI	L 24–45	1,946	
November 11	at Olivet	Cutler Athletic Complex; Olivet, MI	L 10–32	1,205	
*Non-conference game; ^{†}Homecoming

== 2024 ==
2024 Adrian Bulldogs football
- Conference: Michigan Intercollegiate Athletic Association
- Record: 6–4 (3–4 MIAA)
- Head coach: Joe Palka (1st season)
- Home stadium: Docking Stadium

2024 Michigan Intercollegiate Athletic Association football standings
	Conf.			Overall
Team	W		L	W		L
No. 16 Hope $^	7	–	0	11	–	1
Alma	6	–	1	8	–	2
Albion	5	–	2	7	–	3
Trine	4	–	3	6	–	4
Adrian	3	–	4	6	–	4
Olivet	2	–	5	3	–	7
Kalamazoo	1	–	6	4	–	6
Calvin	0	–	7	2	–	8
$ – Conference champion; ^ – NCAA Division III playoff participant; Rankings from D3Football.com

The 2024 Adrian Bulldogs football team represented Adrian College as a member of the Michigan Intercollegiate Athletic Association (MIAA) during the 2024 NCAA Division III football season. In their first year under head coach Joe Palka, the Bulldogs compiled a 6–4 record (3–4 in conference games) and finished in fifth place in the MIAA.

== 2025 ==
2025 Adrian Bulldogs football
- Conference: Michigan Intercollegiate Athletic Association
- Record: 8–2 (5–2 MIAA)
- Head coach: Joe Palka (2nd season)
- Home stadium: Docking Stadium

2025 Michigan Intercollegiate Athletic Association football standings
	Conf.			Overall
Team	W		L	W		L
No. 24 Alma $^	7	–	0	8	–	3
No. 19 Hope ^	6	–	1	9	–	2
Adrian	5	–	2	8	–	2
Calvin	4	–	3	7	–	3
Trine	3	–	4	5	–	5
Kalamazoo	1	–	6	4	–	6
Albion	1	–	6	3	–	7
Olivet	1	–	6	1	–	9
$ – Conference champion; ^ – NCAA Division III playoff participant; Rankings from D3Football.com

The 2025 Adrian Bulldogs football team represented Adrian College as a member of the Michigan Intercollegiate Athletic Association (MIAA) during the 2025 NCAA Division III football season. In their second year under head coach Joe Palka, the Bulldogs compiled an 8–2 record (5–2 in conference games) and finished in third place in the MIAA.

=== Schedule ===
Date	Opponent	Rank	Site	Result	Attendance	Source
September 6	at Valparaiso*		Brown Field; Valparaiso, IN	W 10–7	1,941	
September 13	Thiel*		Docking Stadium; Adrian, MI	W 76–0	1,783	
September 20	Manchester*^{†}		Docking Stadium; Adrian, MI	W 57–0	2,589	
September 27	at Olivet		Cutler Athletic Complex; Olivet, MI	W 59–27	2,205	
October 4	Albion		Docking Stadium; Adrian, MI	W 28–7	1,345	
October 18	at Calvin	No. 25	Calvin Soccer Stadiium; Grand Rapids, MI	W 48–17	1,973	
October 25	No. 19 Hope		Docking Stadium; Adrian, MI	L 17–19	2,793	
November 1	at Kalamazoo		Angell Field; Kalamazoo, MI	W 34–7	755	
November 8	Trine		Docking Stadium; Adrian, MI (Border Brawl)	W 44–21	1,845	
November 15	Alma		Bahlke Field; Alma, MI	L 34–35	2,230	
*Non-conference game; ^{†}Homecoming; Rankings from D3Football.com Poll released prior to the game
