= 2022 Michigan Intercollegiate Athletic Association football season =

- Sport: Football
- Teams: 7
- Champion: Alma

Football seasons

2022 Michigan Intercollegiate Athletic Association football standings
	Conf.			Overall
Team	W		L	W		L
No. 18 Alma $^	6	–	0	11	–	1
Albion	5	–	1	9	–	1
Trine	3	–	3	7	–	3
Hope	3	–	3	6	–	4
Adrian	3	–	3	6	–	4
Olivet	1	–	5	5	–	5
Kalamazoo	0	–	6	3	–	7
$ – Conference champion; ^ – NCAA Division III playoff participant; Rankings from AFCA Poll

The 2022 Michigan Intercollegiate Athletic Association season was the season of college football played by the seven member schools of the Michigan Intercollegiate Athletic Association (MIAA) as part of the 2022 NCAA Division III football season.

The Alma Scots compiled a 10–0 record in the regular season and won the program's first MIAA championship since 2004. They advanced to the NCAA Division III Football Championship playoffs, where they lost in the second round to Aurora.

== Conference overview ==
Conf. rank	Team	Head coach	Overall record	Conf. record	Points scored	Points against
1	Alma	Jason Couch	11–1	6–0	472	240
2	Albion	Dustin Beurer	9–1	5–1	381	141
3	Trine	Troy Abbs	7–3	3–3	303	209
3	Adrian	Jim Deere	6–4	3–3	296	188
3	Hope	Peter Stuursma	6-4	3–3	318	219
6	Olivet	Dan Musielewicz	5–5	1–5	320	271
7	Kalamazoo	Jamie Zorbo	3–7	0–6	210	373

== All-MIAA honors ==
At the end of the regular season in November 2022, the MIAA head coaches voted on individual honors, including the following:

- Most Valuable Offensive Player - Mark Tocco, Albion
- Most Valuable Defensive Player - Keysean Amison, Trine
- Pete Schmidt Memorial Scholar Athlete Award - De'Ondric Sanders, Albion

The following players received first-team honors on the 2022 All-MIAA football team:

Offense

- Quarterback - Carter St. John, Alma
- Running back - Eddie Williams, Alma;
- Wide receivers - Jalen Broussard, Olivet; Kale Lawson, Trine; TJ McKenzie, Hope; Mark Tocco, Albion
- Tight end - Cole Thomas, Alma
- Offensive line - Christopher Beck, Olivet; Alexander Dean, Alm; Jackson Linback, Trine; Jarron Masuga, Albion; Scott Roskopp, Albion

Defense

- Defensive line - Nick Fannon, Albion; DeAndre (Jennings) Ford, Adrian; Jamon Gibson, Trine; Ricky Williamson, Olivet
- Linebackers - Jeremiah Major, Albion; Kyle Minder, Adrian; Kyle Naif, Trine; Odin Soffredine, Alma
- Defensive backs - Keysean Amison, Trine; Stephen Douglas, Albion; Austin Flowers, Alma; Ricky Pearson, Albion

Special teams

- Kicker - Dylan Hillger, Hope
- Punter - Carter Nofziger, Hope
- Return specialist - Jake Gladieux, Trine

== Teams ==
=== Alma ===
2022 Alma Scots football

MIAA champion

NCAA Division III Second Round, L 26–48 vs. Aurora
- Conference: Michigan Intercollegiate Athletic Association

Ranking
- AFCA: No. 23
- Record: 11–1 (6–0 MIAA)
- Head coach: Jason Couch (5th season)
- Home stadium: Bahlke Field

The 2022 Alma Scots football team represented the Alma College as a member of the Michigan Intercollegiate Athletic Association (MIAA) during the 2022 NCAA Division III football season. In their fifth season under head coach Jason Couch, the Scots compiled an 11–1 record (6–0 against conference opponents), won the MIAA championship, and were ranked No. 23 nationally at the end of the regular season.

The team's statistical leaders included Carter St. John with 2,593 passing yards, Eddie Williams with 1,184 rushing yards and 90 points scored, Nathan Goralski with 52 receptions, Devon Frenchko with 574 receiving yards, and Odin Soffredine with 114 total tackles.

Date	Opponent	Site	Result	Attendance	Source
September 3	at Ohio Northern*	Dial Roberson Stadium; Ada, OH	W 16–13 ^{OT}	1,673	
September 10	Manchester (IN)*	Bahlke Field; Alma, MI	W 49–7	1,876	
September 17	at Anderson (IN)*	Macholz Stadium; Anderson, IN	W 45–7	750	
September 24	Martin Luther*	Bahlke Field; Alma, MI	W 69–0	3,035	
October 1	at Trine	Fred Zollner Athletic Stadium; Angola, IN	W 40–21	5,976	
October 15	Hope	Bahlke Field; Alma, MI	W 28–26		
October 22	at Kalamazoo	Angell Field; Kalamazoo, MI	W 45–21	1,400	
October 29	at Olivet	Cutler Athletic Complex; Olivet, MI	W 49–35	2,225	
November 5	Adrian	Bahlke Field; Alma, MI	W 30–10	1,700	
November 12	Albion	Bahlke Field; Alma, MI	W 34–31	4,405	
November 19	Mount St. Joseph*	Bahlke Field; Alma, MI (NCAA Division III First Round)	W 41–21	1,587	
November 26	Aurora*	Bahlke Field; Alma, MI (NCAA Division Second Round)	L 26–48	1,636	
*Non-conference game

=== Albion ===
2022 Albion Britons football
- Conference: Michigan Intercollegiate Athletic Association

Ranking
- AFCA: No. 24
- Record: 9–1 (5–1 MIAA)
- Head coach: Dustin Beurer (4th season)
- Home stadium: Sprankle-Sprandel Stadium

The 2022 Albion Britons football team represented the Albion College as a member of the Michigan Intercollegiate Athletic Association (MIAA) during the 2022 NCAA Division III football season. Under head coach Dustin Beurer, the Britons compiled a 9–1 record (5–1 against conference opponents), finished second in the MIAA, and were ranked No. 24 nationally at the end of the regular season.

Date	Opponent	Site	Result	Attendance	Source
September 3	Carthage*	Sprankle-Sprandel Stadium; Albion, MI	W 52–0		
September 10	Bluffton*	Sprankle-Sprandel Stadium; Albion, MI	W 51–2	570	
September 17	at Rose-Hulman*	Cook Stadium at Phil Brown Field; Terre Haute, IN	W 49–17	1,000	
September 24	at Wisconsin-Eau Claire*	Carson Park; Eau Claire, WI	W 28–20	3,800	
October 1	at Kalamazoo	Angell Field; Kalamazoo, MI	W 48–6	837	
October 8	Hope^{†}	Sprankle-Sprandel Stadium; Albion, MI	W 30–10	4,561	
October 22	at Trine	Fred Zollner Athletic Stadium; Angola, IN	W 20–19	4,265	
October 29	Adrian	Sprankle-Sprandel Stadium; Albion, MI	W 37–9	2,310	
November 5	Olivet	Sprankle-Sprandel Stadium; Albion, MI	W 35–24	1,780	
November 12	at Alma	Bahlke Field; Alma, MI	L 31–34	4,405	
*Non-conference game; ^{†}Homecoming

=== Trine ===
2022 Trine Thunder football
- Conference: Michigan Intercollegiate Athletic Association
- Record: 7–3 (3–3 MIAA)
- Head coach: Troy Abbs (8th season)
- Home stadium: Fred Zollner Athletic Stadium

The 2022 Trine Thunder football team represented the Trine University as a member of the Michigan Intercollegiate Athletic Association (MIAA) during the 2022 NCAA Division III football season. Under head coach Troy Abbs, the Thunder compiled a 7–3 record (3–3 against conference opponents) and tied for third place in the MIAA.

Date	Opponent	Site	Result	Attendance	Source
September 1	Anderson (IN)*	Fred Zollner Athletic Stadium; Angola, IN	W 38–0	4,753	
September 10	at Rose-Hulman*	Cook Stadium at Phil Brown Field; Terre Haute, IN	W 24–23	1,500	
September 17	at Franklin*	Faught Stadium; Franklin, IN	W 55–21	2,222	
September 24	Centre*	Fred Zollner Athletic Stadium; Angola, IN	W 17–0	4,727	
October 1	Alma^{†}	Fred Zollner Athletic Stadium; Angola, IN	L 21–27	5,976	
October 8	at Adrian	Docking Stadium; Adrian, MI	W 27–21	1,175	
October 15	at Olivet	Cutler Athletic Complex; Olivet, MI	W 39–37 ^{3OT}	1,085	
October 22	Albion	Fred Zollner Athletic Stadium; Angola, IN	L 19–20	4,265	
November 5	Hope	Fred Zollner Athletic Stadium; Angola, IN	L 21–28	3,325	
November 12	at Kalamazoo	Angell Field; Kalamazoo, MI	W 42–19	485	
*Non-conference game; ^{†}Homecoming

=== Hope ===
2022 Hope Flying Dutchmen football
- Conference: Michigan Intercollegiate Athletic Association
- Record: 6–4 (3–3 MIAA)
- Head coach: Peter Stuursma (6th season)
- Home stadium: Ray & Sue Smith Stadium

The 2022 Hope Flying Dutchmen football team represented Hope College as a member of the Michigan Intercollegiate Athletic Association (MIAA) during the 2022 NCAA Division III football season. Under head coach Peter Stuursma, the Dutchmen compiled a 6–4 record (3–3 against conference opponents) and tied for third place in the MIAA.

Date	Opponent	Site	Result	Attendance	Source
September 3	Aurora*	Ray and Sue Smith Stadium; Holland, MI	W 38–34	2,779	
September 10	Coe*	Ray and Sue Smith Stadium; Holland, MI	W 33–24	2,088	
September 17	at Mount St. Joseph*	Schueler Field and Sports Complex; Cincinnati, OH	L 28–33	2,000	
September 24	at Northwestern (MN)*	Reynolds Field; Roseville, MN	W 56–7	1,643	
October 1	Adrian	Ray and Sue Smith Stadium; Holland, MI	L 10–22	2,627	
October 8	at Albion	Sprankle-Sprandel; Albion, MI	L 10–30	4,561	
October 15	at Alma	Bahlke Field; Alma, MI	L 26–28		
October 22	Olivet^{†}	Ray and Sue Smith Stadium; Holland, MI	W 23–0	4,101	
October 29	Kalamazoo	Ray and Sue Smith Stadium; Holland, MI	W 66–20	1,984	
November 5	at Trine	Fred Zollner Athletic Stadium; Angola, IN	W 28–21	3,325	
*Non-conference game; ^{†}Homecoming

=== Adrian ===
2022 Adrian Bulldogs football
- Conference: Michigan Intercollegiate Athletic Association
- Record: 6–4 (3–3 MIAA)
- Head coach: Jim Deere (12th season)
- Offensive coordinator: Harry Bailey (8th season)
- Home stadium: Docking Stadium

The 2022 Adrian Bulldogs football team represented Adrian College as a member of the Michigan Intercollegiate Athletic Association (MIAA) during the 2022 NCAA Division III football season. Under head coach Jim Deere, the Bulldogs compiled a 6–4 record (3–3 against conference opponents) and tied for third place in the MIAA.

Date	Opponent	Site	Result	Attendance	Source
September 3	at Heidelberg*	Hoernemann Stadium; Tiffin, OH	L 0–31	2,212	
September 10	Hanover*	Docking Stadium; Adrian, MI	W 33–0	1,854	
September 17	at Bluffton*	Alumni Field; Bluffton, OH	W 58–23	2,500	
September 24	Finlandia*	Docking Stadium; Adrian, MI	W 73–13	2,746	
October 1	at Hope	Ray & Sue Smith Stadium; Holland, MI	W 22–10	1,917	
October 8	Trine	Docking Stadium; Adrian, MI	L 21–27	1,175	
October 15	Kalamazoo	Docking Stadium; Adrian, MI	W 42–17	3,472	
October 29	at Albion	Sprankle-Sprandel; Albion, MI	L 9–37	2,310	
November 5	at Alma	Bahlke Field; Alma, MI	L 10–30	1,700	
November 12	Olivet	Docking Stadium; Adrian, MI	W 28–0	1,057	
*Non-conference game

=== Olivet ===
2022 Olivet Comets football
- Conference: Michigan Intercollegiate Athletic Association
- Record: 5–5 (1–5 MIAA)
- Head coach: Dan Musielewicz (6th season)
- Home stadium: Cutler Field

The 2022 Olivet Comets football team represented Olivet College as a member of the Michigan Intercollegiate Athletic Association (MIAA) during the 2022 NCAA Division III football season. Under head coach Dan Musielewicz, the Comets compiled a 5–5 record (1–5 against conference opponents) and finished in sixth place in the MIAA.

Date	Opponent	Site	Result	Attendance	Source
September 3	Franklin*	Cutler Field; Olivet, MI	W 35–31	2,500	
September 10	Eureka*	Cutler Field; Olivet, MI	W 54–14	2,050	
September 17	at Hanover*	Alumni Field; Hanover, IN	W 31–28	827	
September 24	at Greenville*	Francis Field; Greenville, IL	W 63–7	750	
October 8	Kalamazoo	Cutler Field; Olivet, MI	W 41–17	3,050	
October 15	Trine	Cutler Field; Olivet, MI	L 37–39 ^{3OT}	1,085	
October 22	at Hope	Ray & Sue Smith Stadium; Holland, MI	L 0–23	4,101	
October 29	Alma	Cutler Field; Olivet, MI	L 35–49	2,225	
November 5	at Albion	Sprankle-Sprandel Stadium; Albion, MI	L 24–35	1,780	
November 12	at Adrian	Docking Stadium; Adrian, MI	L 0–28	1,057	
*Non-conference game

=== Kalamazoo ===
2022 Kalamazoo Hornets football
- Conference: Michigan Intercollegiate Athletic Association
- Record: 3–7 (0–6 MIAA)
- Head coach: Jamie Zorbo (15th season)
- Home stadium: Angell Field

The 2022 Kalamazoo Hornets football team represented Kalamazoo College as a member of the Michigan Intercollegiate Athletic Association (MIAA) during the 2022 NCAA Division III football season. Under head coach Jamie Zorbo, the Hornets compiled a 3–7 record (0–6 against conference opponents) and finished in last place in the MIAA.

Date	Opponent	Site	Result	Attendance	Source
September 3	Oberlin*	Angell Field; Kalamazoo, MI	W 21–14		
September 10	Kenyon*	Angell Field; Kalamazoo, MI	W 24-21		
September 17	at Defiance*	Defiance, OH	W 42–23		
September 24	at Alfred*	Alfred, NY	L 23–31		
October 1	Albion	Angell Field; Kalamazoo, MI	L 6–48	837	
October 8	at Olivet	Cutler Field; Olivet, MI	L 17–41	3,050	
October 15	at Adrian	Docking Stadium; Adrian, MI	L 17–42	3,472	
October 22	Alma^{†}	Angell Field; Kalamazoo, MI	L 21–45	1,400	
October 29	at Hope	Ray and Sue Smith Stadium; Holland, MI	L 20–66	1,984	
November 12	Trine	Angell Field; Kalamazoo, MI	L 19–42	485	
*Non-conference game; ^{†}Homecoming
