= Hope Flying Dutchmen football, 2020–present =

American college football seasons

2020–present Hope Flying Dutchmen football
- Conference: Michigan Intercollegiate Athletic Association
- Head coach: Peter Stuursma (2021–present)
- Home stadium: Ray & Sue Smith Stadium

The Hope Flying Tigers football program, 2020–present represented Hope College from 2020 to the present in NCAA Division II college football as a member of the Michigan Intercollegiate Athletic Association (MIAA). The team was led by head coach Peter Stuursma.

The team played its home games at Ray & Sue Smith Stadium.

== 2020 ==
2020 Michigan Intercollegiate Athletic Association football standings
	Conf.			Overall
Team	W		L	W		L
Albion $	3	–	0	3	–	0
Trine	2	–	1	4	–	1
Alma	1	–	1	1	–	1
Adrian	2	–	2	3	–	4
Olivet	1	–	3	1	–	3
Kalamazoo	0	–	2	0	–	2
$ – Conference champion; Note: Finlandia and Hope did not play due to COVID-19.

The 2020 season was cancelled due to the COVID-19 pandemic.

== 2021 ==
2021 Hope Flying Dutchmen football

MIAA co-champion
- Conference: Michigan Intercollegiate Athletic Association
- Record: 8–2 (5–1 MIAA)
- Head coach: Peter Stuursma (5th season)
- Home stadium: Ray & Sue Smith Stadium

2021 Michigan Intercollegiate Athletic Association football standings
	Conf.			Overall
Team	W		L	W		L
No. 25 Albion +^	5	–	1	9	–	2
Hope +	5	–	1	8	–	2
Trine	4	–	2	6	–	4
Olivet	3	–	3	7	–	3
Adrian	3	–	3	5	–	5
Alma	1	–	5	5	–	5
Kalamazoo	0	–	6	1	–	9
$ – Conference champion; ^ – NCAA Division III playoff participant; Rankings from AFCA Poll

The 2021 Hope Flying Dutchmen football team represented Hope College as a member of the Michigan Intercollegiate Athletic Association (MIAA) during the 2021 NCAA Division III football season. Under head coach Peter Stuursma, the Dutchmen compiled an 8–2 record (5–1 against conference opponents) and tied for the MIAA championship

=== Schedule ===
Date	Opponent	Site	Result	Attendance	Source
September 3	Anderson	Ray & Sue Smith Stadium; Holland, MI	W 42–7		
September 11	at Coe	Clark Field; Cedar Rapids, IA	L 21–28	472	
September 18	Rose-Hulman	Ray and Sue Smith Stadium; Holland, MI	W 27–20		
September 25	Northwestern (MN)	Ray and Sue Smith Stadium; Holland, MI	W 52–10		
October 2	Kalamazoo	Ray and Sue Smith Stadium; Holland, MI	W 67–0		
October 16	at Olivet	Cutler Athletic Complex; Olivet, MI	W 31–16	2,555	
October 23	Adrian	Ray and Sue Smith Stadium; Holland, MI	W 19–7	2,510	
October 30	at Alma	Bahlke Field; Alma, MI	W 27–3		
November 6	Albion	Ray and Sue Smith Stadium; Holland, MI	L 38–41	2,930	
November 13	at Trine	Fred Zollner Athletic Stadium; Angola, IN	W 17–13	4,219	

== 2022 ==
2022 Hope Flying Dutchmen football
- Conference: Michigan Intercollegiate Athletic Association
- Record: 6–4 (3–3 MIAA)
- Head coach: Peter Stuursma (6th season)
- Home stadium: Ray & Sue Smith Stadium

2022 Michigan Intercollegiate Athletic Association football standings
	Conf.			Overall
Team	W		L	W		L
No. 18 Alma $^	6	–	0	11	–	1
Albion	5	–	1	9	–	1
Trine	3	–	3	7	–	3
Hope	3	–	3	6	–	4
Adrian	3	–	3	6	–	4
Olivet	1	–	5	5	–	5
Kalamazoo	0	–	6	3	–	7
$ – Conference champion; ^ – NCAA Division III playoff participant; Rankings from AFCA Poll

The 2022 Hope Flying Dutchmen football team represented Hope College as a member of the Michigan Intercollegiate Athletic Association (MIAA) during the 2022 NCAA Division III football season. Under head coach Peter Stuursma, the Dutchmen compiled a 6–4 record (3–3 against conference opponents) and tied for third place in the MIAA.

=== Schedule ===
Date	Opponent	Site	Result	Attendance	Source
September 3	Aurora*	Ray & Sue Smith Stadium; Holland, MI	W 38–34	2,779	
September 10	Coe*	Ray and Sue Smith Stadium; Holland, MI	W 33–24	2,088	
September 17	at Mount St. Joseph*	Schueler Field and Sports Complex; Cincinnati, OH	L 28–33	2,000	
September 24	at Northwestern (MN)*	Reynolds Field; Roseville, MN	W 56–7	1,643	
October 1	Adrian	Ray and Sue Smith Stadium; Holland, MI	L 10–22	2,627	
October 8	at Albion	Sprankle-Sprandel; Albion, MI	L 10–30	4,561	
October 15	at Alma	Bahlke Field; Alma, MI	L 26–28		
October 22	Olivet^{†}	Ray and Sue Smith Stadium; Holland, MI	W 23–0	4,101	
October 29	Kalamazoo	Ray and Sue Smith Stadium; Holland, MI	W 66–20	1,984	
November 5	at Trine	Fred Zollner Athletic Stadium; Angola, IN	W 28–21	3,325	
*Non-conference game; ^{†}Homecoming

== 2023 ==
2023 Hope Flying Dutchmen football
- Conference: Michigan Intercollegiate Athletic Association
- Record: 8–2 (5–1 MIAA)
- Head coach: Peter Stuursma (7th season)
- Home stadium: Ray & Sue Smith Stadium

2023 Michigan Intercollegiate Athletic Association football standings
	Conf.			Overall
Team	W		L	W		L
No. 6 Alma $^	6	–	0	12	–	1
Hope	5	–	1	8	–	2
Trine	4	–	2	6	–	4
Albion	3	–	3	7	–	3
Olivet	2	–	4	4	–	6
Kalamazoo	1	–	5	5	–	5
Adrian	0	–	6	1	–	9
$ – Conference champion; ^ – NCAA Division III playoff participant; Rankings from D3Football.com

The 2023 Hope Flying Dutchmen football team represented Hope College as a member of the Michigan Intercollegiate Athletic Association (MIAA) during the 2023 NCAA Division III football season. In their seventh season under head coach Peter Stuursma, the Dutchmen compiled an 8–2 record (5–1 against conference opponents) and finished in second place in the MIAA.

=== Schedule ===
Date	Opponent	Site	Result	Attendance	Source
September 2	at Aurora*	Spartan Athletic Park; Aurora, IL	L 17–38	1,127	
September 9	Loras*	Ray & Sue Smith Stadium; Holland, MI	W 42–28	2,344	
September 16	Mount St. Joseph*	Ray and Sue Smith Stadium; Holland, MI	W 40–35	2,124	
September 23	Northwestern (MN)*	Ray and Sue Smith Stadium; Holland, MI	W 54–17	1,850	
September 30	at Adrian	Docking Stadium; Adrian, MI	W 30–21	1,294	
October 7	Albion	Ray and Sue Smith Stadium; Holland, MI	W 14–6	1,606	
October 14	Alma	Ray and Sue Smith Stadium; Holland, MI	L 17–35	2,870	
October 21	at Olivet	Cutler Athletic Complex; Olivet, MI	W 45–7	3,215	
October 28	at Kalamazoo	Angell Field; Kalamazoo, MI	W 63–17	985	
November 4	Trine	Ray and Sue Smith Stadium; Holland, MI	W 38–28	2,033	
*Non-conference game

== 2024 ==
2024 Hope Flying Dutchmen football

MIAA champion
- Conference: Michigan Intercollegiate Athletic Association
- Record: 11–1 (7–0 MIAA)
- Head coach: Peter Stuursma (8th season)
- Home stadium: Ray & Sue Smith Stadium

2024 Michigan Intercollegiate Athletic Association football standings
	Conf.			Overall
Team	W		L	W		L
No. 16 Hope $^	7	–	0	11	–	1
Alma	6	–	1	8	–	2
Albion	5	–	2	7	–	3
Trine	4	–	3	6	–	4
Adrian	3	–	4	6	–	4
Olivet	2	–	5	3	–	7
Kalamazoo	1	–	6	4	–	6
Calvin	0	–	7	2	–	8
$ – Conference champion; ^ – NCAA Division III playoff participant; Rankings from D3Football.com

The 2024 Hope Flying Dutchmen football team represented Hope College as a member of the Michigan Intercollegiate Athletic Association (MIAA) during the 2024 NCAA Division III football season. In their eighth season under head coach Peter Stuursma, the Dutchmen compiled an 11–1 record (7–0 in conference games), won the MIAA championship, and lost to North Central in the third round of the NCAA Division III playoffs.

=== Schedule ===
Date	Opponent	Site	Result	Attendance	Source
September 7	Loras*	Ray & Sue Smith Stadium; Holland, MI	W 49–0	2,861	
September 14	Franklin*	Ray and Sue Smith Stadium; Holland, MI	W 48–6	2,020	
September 21	at Rose-Hulman*	Phil Browwn Field; Terre Haute, IN	W 49–7	629	
September 28	at Alma	Bahlke Field; Alma, MI	W 34–13	2,725	
October 5	Trine	Ray and Sue Smith Stadium; Holland, MI	W 42–6	2,075	
October 19	at Kalamazoo	Angell Fiel; Kalamazoo, MI	W 49–18	2,000	
October 26	Adrian	Ray and Sue Smith Stadium; Holland, MI	W 45–0	4,117	
November 2	Albion	Ray and Sue Smith Stadium; Holland, MI	W 41–14	2,442	
November 9	at Calvin	Grand Rapids Christian HS; Grand Rapids, MI	W 38–7	4,802	
November 16	at Olivet	Cutler Athletic Complex; Olivet, MI	W 48–12	2,555	
November 30	Aurora	Ray and Sue Smith Stadium; Holland, MI (NCAA DIII playoffs, round 2)	W 49–21	1,811	
December 7	at North Central	Benedetti–Wehrli Stadium; Naperville, IL (NCAA DIII playoffs, round 3)	L 21–41	4,000	
*Non-conference game

== 2025 ==
2025 Hope Flying Dutchmen football

NCAA Division III Second Round, L 7–9 at Wisconsin–La Crosse
- Conference: Michigan Intercollegiate Athletic Association
- Record: 9–2 (6–1 MIAA)
- Head coach: Peter Stuursma (9th season)
- Home stadium: Ray & Sue Smith Stadium

2025 Michigan Intercollegiate Athletic Association football standings
	Conf.			Overall
Team	W		L	W		L
No. 24 Alma $^	7	–	0	8	–	3
No. 19 Hope ^	6	–	1	9	–	2
Adrian	5	–	2	8	–	2
Calvin	4	–	3	7	–	3
Trine	3	–	4	5	–	5
Kalamazoo	1	–	6	4	–	6
Albion	1	–	6	3	–	7
Olivet	1	–	6	1	–	9
$ – Conference champion; ^ – NCAA Division III playoff participant; Rankings from D3Football.com

The 2025 Hope Flying Dutchmen football team represents Hope College as a member of the Michigan Intercollegiate Athletic Association (MIAA) during the 2025 NCAA Division III football season. In their ninth season under head coach Peter Stuursma, the Dutchmen have compiled a 9–2 record (6–1 in conference games).

=== Schedule ===
Date	Opponent	Rank	Site	TV	Result	Attendance	Source
September 6	at Loras*	No. 20	Rock Bowl; Dubuque, IA		W 62–0	675	
September 13	at Franklin*	No. 18	Faught Stadium; Franklin, IN		W 38–14	622	
September 20	Mount St. Joseph*	No. 15	Ray & Sue Smith Stadium; Holland, MI		W 31–28	3,013	
September 27	Alma	No. 15	Ray and Sue Smith Stadium; Holland, MI		L 26–29 ^{OT}	3,206	
October 4	at Trine	No. 20	Fred Zollner Athletic Stadium; Angola, IN		W 55–35	5,431	
October 18	Kalamazoo	No. 19	Ray and Sue Smith Stadium; Holland, MI		W 56–21	3,839	
October 25	at Adrian	No. 19	Docking Stadium; Adrian, MI		W 19–17	2,793	
November 1	at Albion	No. 16	Sprankle-Sprandel; Albion, MI		W 62–0	1,232	
November 8	Calvin	No. 16	Ray and Sue Smith Stadium; Holland, MI		W 52–0	5,651	
November 15	Olivet	No. 16	Ray and Sue Smith Stadium; Holland, MI		W 63–6	2,170	
November 29	No. 13 Wisconsin–La Crosse*	No. 18	Ray and Sue Smith Stadium; Holland, MI (NCAA Division III Second Round)	ESPN+	L 7–9	1,003	
*Non-conference game; Rankings from D3Football.com Poll released prior to the game
