= Albion Britons football, 2020–present =

American college football seasons

2020–present Albion Britons football
- Conference: Michigan Intercollegiate Athletic Association
- Head coach: Dustin Beurer (2019–2022); Travis Rundle (2023–present)
- Home stadium: Ray & Sue Smith Stadium

The Albion Britons football program, 2020–present represented Albion College from 2020 to the present in NCAA Division II college football as a member of the Michigan Intercollegiate Athletic Association (MIAA). The team was led by head coaches Dustin Beurer (2019–2022) and Travis Rundle (2023–present).

== 2020 ==
The 2020 season was cancelled due to the COVID-19 pandemic.

== 2021 ==
2021 Albion Britons football

MIAA co-champion

NCAA Division III first round, L 23–58 vs. Wisconsin–La Crosse
- Conference: Michigan Intercollegiate Athletic Association
- Record: 9–2 (5–1 MIAA)
- Head coach: Dustin Beurer (3rd season)
- Home stadium: Sprankle-Sprandel Stadium

2021 Michigan Intercollegiate Athletic Association football standings
	Conf.			Overall
Team	W		L	W		L
No. 25 Albion +^	5	–	1	9	–	2
Hope +	5	–	1	8	–	2
Trine	4	–	2	6	–	4
Olivet	3	–	3	7	–	3
Adrian	3	–	3	5	–	5
Alma	1	–	5	5	–	5
Kalamazoo	0	–	6	1	–	9
$ – Conference champion; ^ – NCAA Division III playoff participant; Rankings from AFCA Poll

The 2021 Albion Britons football team represented the Albion College as a member of the Michigan Intercollegiate Athletic Association (MIAA) during the 2021 NCAA Division III football season. Under head coach Dustin Beurer, the Britons compiled a 9–1 record in the regular season (5–1 against conference opponents), tied for the MIAA championship, and lost to Wisconsin–La Crosse in the first round of the NCAA Division III Football Championship playoffs.

In December 2021, coach Beurer was selected by the American Football Coaches Association as the Regional Coach of the Year for Region 4. Two Alma players, wide receiver Justin Thomas and defensive end Mitch Arendsen, were selected as the MIAA Offensive and Defensive Most Valuable Players.

=== Schedule ===
Date	Opponent	Site	Result	Attendance	Source
September 4	at Mount St. Joseph*	Schueler Field; Cincinnati, OH	W 36–20	578	
September 11	at Defiance*	Justin F. Coressel Stadium; Defiance, OH	W 51–0	250	
September 18	Hanover*	Sprankle-Sprandel Stadium; Albion, MI	W 24–14		
September 25	Wisconsin–Eau Claire*	Sprankle-Sprandel Stadium; Albion, MI	W 23–20	446	
October 9	at Adrian	Docking Stadium; Adrian, MI	L 7–21	1,840	
October 16	at Kalamazoo	Angell Field; Kalamazoo, MI	W 49–0		
October 23	Olivet	Sprankle-Sprandel Stadium; Albion, MI	W 38–17	3,817	
October 30	Trine	Sprankle-Sprandel Stadium; Albion, MI	W 31–24	2,683	
November 6	at Hope	Ray and Sue Smith Stadium; Holland, MI	W 41–38	2,930	
November 13	Alma	Sprankle-Sprandel Stadium; Albion, MI	W 34–8	3,408	
November 20	Wisconsin–La Crosse*	Sprankle-Sprandel Stadium; Albion, MI (NCAA Division III first round)	L 23–58	975	
*Non-conference game

== 2022 ==
2022 Albion Britons football
- Conference: Michigan Intercollegiate Athletic Association

Ranking
- AFCA: No. 24
- Record: 9–1 (5–1 MIAA)
- Head coach: Dustin Beurer (4th season)
- Home stadium: Sprankle-Sprandel Stadium

2022 Michigan Intercollegiate Athletic Association football standings
	Conf.			Overall
Team	W		L	W		L
No. 18 Alma $^	6	–	0	11	–	1
Albion	5	–	1	9	–	1
Trine	3	–	3	7	–	3
Hope	3	–	3	6	–	4
Adrian	3	–	3	6	–	4
Olivet	1	–	5	5	–	5
Kalamazoo	0	–	6	3	–	7
$ – Conference champion; ^ – NCAA Division III playoff participant; Rankings from AFCA Poll

The 2022 Albion Britons football team represented the Albion College as a member of the Michigan Intercollegiate Athletic Association (MIAA) during the 2022 NCAA Division III football season. Under head coach Dustin Beurer, the Britons compiled a 9–1 record (5–1 against conference opponents), finished second in the MIAA, and were ranked No. 24 nationally at the end of the regular season.

=== Schedule ===
Date	Opponent	Site	Result	Attendance	Source
September 3	Carthage*	Sprankle-Sprandel Stadium; Albion, MI	W 52–0		
September 10	Bluffton*	Sprankle-Sprandel Stadium; Albion, MI	W 51–2	570	
September 17	at Rose-Hulman*	Cook Stadium at Phil Brown Field; Terre Haute, IN	W 49–17	1,000	
September 24	at Wisconsin-Eau Claire*	Carson Park; Eau Claire, WI	W 28–20	3,800	
October 1	at Kalamazoo	Angell Field; Kalamazoo, MI	W 48–6	837	
October 8	Hope^{†}	Sprankle-Sprandel Stadium; Albion, MI	W 30–10	4,561	
October 22	at Trine	Fred Zollner Athletic Stadium; Angola, IN	W 20–19	4,265	
October 29	Adrian	Sprankle-Sprandel Stadium; Albion, MI	W 37–9	2,310	
November 5	Olivet	Sprankle-Sprandel Stadium; Albion, MI	W 35–24	1,780	
November 12	at Alma	Bahlke Field; Alma, MI	L 31–34	4,405	
*Non-conference game; ^{†}Homecoming

== 2023 ==
2023 Albion Britons football
- Conference: Michigan Intercollegiate Athletic Association
- Record: 7–3 (3–3 MIAA)
- Head coach: Travis Rundle (1st season)
- Home stadium: Sprankle-Sprandel Stadium

2023 Michigan Intercollegiate Athletic Association football standings
	Conf.			Overall
Team	W		L	W		L
No. 6 Alma $^	6	–	0	12	–	1
Hope	5	–	1	8	–	2
Trine	4	–	2	6	–	4
Albion	3	–	3	7	–	3
Olivet	2	–	4	4	–	6
Kalamazoo	1	–	5	5	–	5
Adrian	0	–	6	1	–	9
$ – Conference champion; ^ – NCAA Division III playoff participant; Rankings from D3Football.com

The 2023 Albion Britons football team represented Albion College as a member of the Michigan Intercollegiate Athletic Association (MIAA) during the 2023 NCAA Division III football season. In their first season under head coach Travis Rundle, the Britons compiled a 7–3 record (3–3 against conference opponents) and finished third in the MIAA.

=== Schedule ===
Date	Opponent	Site	Result	Attendance	Source
September 2	at Carthage*	Art Keller Field; Kenosha, WI	W 41–20	1,050	
September 9	at Bluffton*	Alumni Field; Bluffton, OH	W 42–20	600	
September 16	Rose-Hulman*	Sprankle-Sprandel Stadium; Albion, MI	W 48–19	2,874	
September 23	Wisconsin-Stevens Point*	Sprankle-Sprandel Stadium; Albion, MI	W 30–7	2,019	
September 30	Kalamazoo^{†}	Sprankle-Sprandel Stadium; Albion, MI	W 44–17	4,069	
October 7	at Hope	Ray & Sue Smith Stadium; Holland, MI	L 6–14	1,606	
October 21	Trine	Sprankle-Sprandel Stadium; Albion, MI	L 28–35	1,087	
October 28	at Adrian	Docking Stadium; Adrian, MI	W 34–21	342	
November 4	at Olivet	Cutler Athletic Complex; Olivet, MI	W 35–7	1,250	
November 11	Alma	Sprankle-Sprandel Stadium; Albion, MI	L 14–50	1,450	
*Non-conference game; ^{†}Homecoming

== 2024 ==
2024 Albion Britons football
- Conference: Michigan Intercollegiate Athletic Association
- Record: 7–3 (5–2 MIAA)
- Head coach: Travis Rundle (2nd season)
- Home stadium: Sprankle-Sprandel Stadium

2024 Michigan Intercollegiate Athletic Association football standings
	Conf.			Overall
Team	W		L	W		L
No. 16 Hope $^	7	–	0	11	–	1
Alma	6	–	1	8	–	2
Albion	5	–	2	7	–	3
Trine	4	–	3	6	–	4
Adrian	3	–	4	6	–	4
Olivet	2	–	5	3	–	7
Kalamazoo	1	–	6	4	–	6
Calvin	0	–	7	2	–	8
$ – Conference champion; ^ – NCAA Division III playoff participant; Rankings from D3Football.com

The 2024 Albion Britons football team represented Albion College as a member of the Michigan Intercollegiate Athletic Association (MIAA) during the 2024 NCAA Division III football season. In their second season under head coach Travis Rundle, the Britons compiled a 7–3 record (5–2 in conference games) and finished in third place in the MIAA.

=== Schedule ===
Date	Opponent	Site	Result	Attendance	Source
September 7	Wisconsin-Stevens Point*	Sprankle-Sprandel Stadium; Albion, MI	W 31–23	1,405	
September 14	Bluffton*	Sprankle-Sprandel Stadium; Albion, MI	W 56–21	1,478	
September 21	at Mount St. Joseph*	Schueler Field and Sports Complex; Cincinnati, OH	L 14–49	900	
September 28	at Trine	Fred Zollner Athletic Stadium; Angola, IN	W 42–14	5,063	
October 5	Adrian^{†}	Sprankle-Sprandel Stadium; Albion, MI	W 38–27	1,920	
October 19	at Alma	Bahlke Field; Alma, MI	L 30–40	1,847	
October 26	Kalamazoo	Sprankle-Sprandel Stadium; Albion, MI	W 28–23	1,029	
November 2	at Hope	Ray & Sue Smith Stadium; Holland, MI	L 14–41	2,442	
November 9	Olivet	Sprankle-Sprandel Stadium; Albion, MI	W 49–14	1,765	
November 16	at Calvin	Eagles Stadium; Grand Rapids, MI	W 41–21	2,424	
*Non-conference game; ^{†}Homecoming

== 2025 ==
2025 Albion Britons football
- Conference: Michigan Intercollegiate Athletic Association
- Record: 3–7 (1–6 MIAA)
- Head coach: Travis Rundle (3rd season)
- Home stadium: Sprankle-Sprandel Stadium

2025 Michigan Intercollegiate Athletic Association football standings
	Conf.			Overall
Team	W		L	W		L
No. 24 Alma $^	7	–	0	8	–	3
No. 19 Hope ^	6	–	1	9	–	2
Adrian	5	–	2	8	–	2
Calvin	4	–	3	7	–	3
Trine	3	–	4	5	–	5
Kalamazoo	1	–	6	4	–	6
Albion	1	–	6	3	–	7
Olivet	1	–	6	1	–	9
$ – Conference champion; ^ – NCAA Division III playoff participant; Rankings from D3Football.com

The 2025 Albion Britons football team represents Albion College as a member of the Michigan Intercollegiate Athletic Association (MIAA) during the 2025 NCAA Division III football season. In their third season under head coach Travis Rundle, the Britons have compiled a 3–7 record (1–6 in conference games).

=== Schedule ===
Date	Opponent	Site	Result	Attendance	Source
September 6	at Wisconsin-Stevens Point*	Stevens Point, WI	L 21–28 ^{OT}	1,405	
September 13	at Bluffton*	Bluffton, OH	W 45–39 ^{2OT}	400	
September 20	Rose-Hulman*	Sprankle-Sprandel Stadium; Albion, MI	W 25–17	1,110	
September 27	Trine	Sprankle-Sprandel Stadium; Albion, MI	L 35–38	1,513	
October 4	at Adrian	Docking Stadium; Adrian, MI	L 7–28	1,345	
October 18	Alma^{†}	Sprankle-Sprandel Stadium; Albion, MI (rivalry)	L 27–48	4,256	
October 25	at Kalamazoo	Angell Field; Kalamazoo, MI	L 26–30	800	
November 1	No. 16 Hope	Sprankle-Sprandel Stadium; Albion, MI	L 0–62	1,232	
November 8	at Olivet	Olivet, MI	W 58–42	905	
November 15	Calvin	Sprankle-Sprandel Stadium; Albion, MI	L 24–53	1,032	
*Non-conference game; ^{†}Homecoming; Rankings from D3Football.com Poll released prior to the game
