= Dan Musielewicz =

American football coach (born 1981)

Biographical details
- Born: November 2, 1981 (age 44); Britton, Michigan, U.S.
- Education: Hillsdale College (B.S., 2005); Concordia University Irvine (M.A., 2012)

Playing career

Football
- 2001–2004: Hillsdale
- 2006: Fort Wayne Freedom
- 2007–2008: Kalamazoo Xplosion
- 2009: Fort Wayne Freedom

Basketball
- 2004–2005: Hillsdale
- Positions: Wide receiver (football); Point guard (basketball)

Coaching career (HC unless noted)

Football
- 2005: Tecumseh HS (MI) (assistant)
- 2006–2011: Tri-State / Trine (WR)
- 2012–2016: Olivet (OC/RC)
- 2017–2024: Olivet

Basketball
- 2005–2006: Tecumseh HS (MI) (assistant)

Head coaching record
- Overall: 39–35

Dan "Moose" Musielewicz (born November 2, 1981) is an American college football coach. He was the head football coach for Olivet College from 2017 to 2024.

== Playing career ==
Musielewicz attended Britton-Macon High School where he was a member of the football team which he helped win three straight Tri-County Conference champions from 1997 to 1999. Musielewicz then enrolled at Hillsdale College where, after a red-shirt season, he was a four-year starter at wide receiver.

=== Statistics ===
Season	Team	GP	Receiving			
Season	Team	GP	Rec	Yds	Avg	TD
2001	Hillsdale	11	28	356	12.7	1
2002	Hillsdale	11	31	400	12.9	2
2003	Hillsdale	11	30	305	10.2	0
2004	Hillsdale	11	23	206	9.0	1
Career		44	112	1,267	11.2	4

== Head coaching record ==
Year	Team	Overall	Conference	Standing	Bowl/playoffs
Olivet Comets (Michigan Intercollegiate Athletic Association) (2017–2024)
2017	Olivet	5–5	3–3	4th	
2018	Olivet	6–4	4–3	T–3rd	
2019	Olivet	8–2	5–2	T–2nd	
2020–21	Olivet	1–3	1–3	5th	
2021	Olivet	7–3	3–3	T–4th	
2022	Olivet	5–5	1–5	6th	
2023	Olivet	4–6	2–4	5th	
2024	Olivet	3–7	2–5	6th	
Olivet:		39–35	21–28		
Total:		39–35			
