= 2021 Michigan Intercollegiate Athletic Association football season =

- Sport: Football
- Number of teams: 7
- Co-champions: Albion, Hope

Football seasons
- ← 2020 2022 →

2021 Michigan Intercollegiate Athletic Association football standings
| | Conf. | | | Overall |
| Team | W | | L | W | | L |
|---|---|---|---|---|---|---|
| No. 25 Albion +^ | 5 | – | 1 | 9 | – | 2 |
| Hope + | 5 | – | 1 | 8 | – | 2 |
| Trine | 4 | – | 2 | 6 | – | 4 |
| Olivet | 3 | – | 3 | 7 | – | 3 |
| Adrian | 3 | – | 3 | 5 | – | 5 |
| Alma | 1 | – | 5 | 5 | – | 5 |
| Kalamazoo | 0 | – | 6 | 1 | – | 9 |
$ – Conference champion; ^ – NCAA Division III playoff participant; Rankings from AFCA Poll

The 2021 Michigan Intercollegiate Athletic Association season was the season of college football played by the seven member schools of the Michigan Intercollegiate Athletic Association (MIAA) as part of the 2021 NCAA Division III football season.

The Albion Britons and Hope Flying Dutchmen tied for the MIAA championship. Albion won the head-to-head matchup and advanced to the NCAA Division III playoffs, losing to Wisconsin–La Crosse in the first round.

The Olivet Comets led the MIAA in scoring offense with 388 points in 10 games (38.8 points per game). Hope led the MIAA in scoring defense, allowing only 145 points in 10 games (14.5 points per games).

== Conference overview ==
| Conf. rank | Team | Head coach | Overall record | Conf. record | Points scored | Points against |
|---|---|---|---|---|---|---|
| 1 (tie) | Albion | Dustin Beurer | 9–2 | 5–1 | 357 | 220 |
| 1 (tie) | Hope | Peter Stuursma | 8–2 | 5–1 | 341 | 145 |
| 3 | Trine | Troy Abbs | 6–4 | 4–2 | 331 | 188 |
| 4 (tie) | Olivet | Dan Musielewicz | 7–3 | 3–3 | 388 | 212 |
| 4 (tie) | Adrian | Jim Deere | 5–5 | 3–3 | 276 | 242 |
| 6 | Alma | Jason Couch | 5–5 | 1–5 | | |
| 7 | Kalamazoo | Jamie Zorbo | 1–9 | 0–6 | | |

== All-MIAA honors ==
At the end of the regular season in November 2021, the MIAA head coaches voted on individual honors, including the following:

- Most Valuable Offensive Player - Justin Thomas, Albion, wide receiver
- Most Valuable Defensive Player - Mitch Arendsen, Albion, defensive end
- Pete Schmidt Memorial Scholar Athlete Award - Justin White, Trine

The following players received first-team honors on the 2021 All-MIAA football team:

Offense

- Quarterback - Jack Bush, Albion
- Running backs - Cortaveon Barnett, Olivet; Steven Moses, Adrian
- Wide receivers - Terrell Harris, Hope; Justin Thomas, Albion; Bubba Wilson, Kalamazoo
- Tight end - Seth Young, Olivet
- Offensive line - Christopher Beck, Olivet; Brady Eding, Hope; Luke Marsh, Hope; Jarret Nighswander, Albion; Ben Pelletier, Adrian

Defense

- Defensive line - Mitch Arendsen, Albion; Jamon Gibson, Trine; Alonzo Grigsby, Olivet; Ta'Mar Heart-Wilkins, Olivet
- Linebackers - Jeremiah Major, Albion; Kyle Minder, Adrian; Kyle Naif, Trine; Odin Soffredine, Alma
- Defensive backs - Keysean Arnison, Trine; Brady Howe, Hope; Jack Kretzschmar, Alma; John Wester, Albion

Special teams

- Kicker - Ryan Hibbetts, Trine
- Punter - Austin Behnke, Adrian
- Return specialist - Josh Davis, Trine

== Teams ==
=== Albion ===
2021 Albion Britons football

MIAA co-champion

NCAA Division III first round, L 23–58 vs. Wisconsin–La Crosse
- Conference: Michigan Intercollegiate Athletic Association
- Record: 9–2 (5–1 MIAA)
- Head coach: Dustin Beurer (3rd season)
- Home stadium: Sprankle-Sprandel Stadium

The 2021 Albion Britons football team represented the Albion College as a member of the Michigan Intercollegiate Athletic Association (MIAA) during the 2021 NCAA Division III football season. Under head coach Dustin Beurer, the Britons compiled a 9–1 record in the regular season (5–1 against conference opponents), tied for the MIAA championship, and lost to Wisconsin–La Crosse in the first round of the NCAA Division III Football Championship playoffs.

In December 2021, coach Beurer was selected by the American Football Coaches Association as the Regional Coach of the Year for Region 4. Two Alma players, wide receiver Justin Thomas and defensive end Mitch Arendsen, were selected as the MIAA Offensive and Defensive Most Valuable Players.

| Date | Opponent | Site | Result | Attendance | Source |
|---|---|---|---|---|---|
| September 4 | at Mount St. Joseph* | Schueler Field; Cincinnati, OH | W 36–20 | 578 | |
| September 11 | at Defiance* | Justin F. Coressel Stadium; Defiance, OH | W 51–0 | 250 | |
| September 18 | Hanover* | Sprankle-Sprandel Stadium; Albion, MI | W 24–14 | | |
| September 25 | Wisconsin–Eau Claire* | Sprankle-Sprandel Stadium; Albion, MI | W 23–20 | 446 | |
| October 9 | at Adrian | Docking Stadium; Adrian, MI | L 7–21 | 1,840 | |
| October 16 | at Kalamazoo | Angell Field; Kalamazoo, MI | W 49–0 | | |
| October 23 | Olivet | Sprankle-Sprandel Stadium; Albion, MI | W 38–17 | 3,817 | |
| October 30 | Trine | Sprankle-Sprandel Stadium; Albion, MI | W 31–24 | 2,683 | |
| November 6 | at Hope | Ray and Sue Smith Stadium; Holland, MI | W 41–38 | 2,930 | |
| November 13 | Alma | Sprankle-Sprandel Stadium; Albion, MI | W 34–8 | 3,408 | |
| November 20 | Wisconsin–La Crosse* | Sprankle-Sprandel Stadium; Albion, MI (NCAA Division III first round) | L 23–58 | 975 | |
*Non-conference game

=== Hope ===
2021 Hope Flying Dutchmen football

MIAA co-champion
- Conference: Michigan Intercollegiate Athletic Association
- Record: 8–2 (5–1 MIAA)
- Head coach: Peter Stuursma (5th season)
- Home stadium: Ray & Sue Smith Stadium

The 2021 Hope Flying Dutchmen football team represented Hope College as a member of the Michigan Intercollegiate Athletic Association (MIAA) during the 2021 NCAA Division III football season. Under head coach Peter Stuursma, the Dutchmen compiled an 8–2 record (5–1 against conference opponents) and tied for the MIAA championship

| Date | Opponent | Site | Result | Attendance | Source |
|---|---|---|---|---|---|
| September 3 | Anderson | Ray and Sue Smith Stadium; Holland, MI | W 42–7 | | |
| September 11 | at Coe | Clark Field; Cedar Rapids, IA | L 21–28 | 472 | |
| September 18 | Rose-Hulman | Ray and Sue Smith Stadium; Holland, MI | W 27–20 | | |
| September 25 | Northwestern (MN) | Ray and Sue Smith Stadium; Holland, MI | W 52–10 | | |
| October 2 | Kalamazoo | Ray and Sue Smith Stadium; Holland, MI | W 67–0 | | |
| October 16 | at Olivet | Cutler Athletic Complex; Olivet, MI | W 31–16 | 2,555 | |
| October 23 | Adrian | Ray and Sue Smith Stadium; Holland, MI | W 19–7 | 2,510 | |
| October 30 | at Alma | Bahlke Field; Alma, MI | W 27–3 | | |
| November 6 | Albion | Ray and Sue Smith Stadium; Holland, MI | L 38–41 | 2,930 | |
| November 13 | at Trine | Fred Zollner Athletic Stadium; Angola, IN | W 17–13 | 4,219 | |

=== Trine ===
2021 Trine Thunder football
- Conference: Michigan Intercollegiate Athletic Association
- Record: 6–4 (4–2 MIAA)
- Head coach: Troy Abbs (7th season)
- Home stadium: Fred Zollner Athletic Stadium

The 2021 Trine Thunder football team represented the Trine University as a member of the Michigan Intercollegiate Athletic Association (MIAA) during the 2021 NCAA Division III football season. Under head coach Troy Abbs, the Thunder compiled a 6–4 record (4–2 against conference opponents) and finished in third place in the MIAA.

| Date | Opponent | Site | Result | Attendance | Source |
|---|---|---|---|---|---|
| September 2 | at Manchester* | N. Manchester, IN | W 52–14 | | |
| September 11 | Rose-Hulman* | Fred Zollner Athletic Stadium; Angola, IN | L 31–30 | | |
| September 18 | Mount St. Joseph* | Fred Zollner Athletic Stadium; Angola, IN | W 31–30 ^{OT} | | |
| September 25 | at Centre* | Farris Stadium; Danville, KY | L 14–7 | | |
| October 2 | Adrian | Fred Zollner Athletic Stadium; Angola, IN | W 36–20 | | |
| October 9 | at Olivet | Olivet, MI | W 35–14 | | |
| October 23 | Kalamazoo | Fred Zollner Athletic Stadium; Angola, IN | W 47–13 | | |
| October 30 | at Albion | Albion, MI | L 31–24 | | |
| November 6 | at Alma | Alma, MI | W 37–23 | | |
| November 13 | Hope | Fred Zollner Athletic Stadium; Angola, IN | L 17–13 | | |
*Non-conference game

=== Olivet ===
2021 Olivet Comets football
- Conference: Michigan Intercollegiate Athletic Association
- Record: 7–3 (3–3 MIAA)
- Head coach: Dan Musielewicz (4th season)
- Home stadium: Cutler Athletic Complex

The 2021 Olivet Comets football team represented Olivet College as a member of the Michigan Intercollegiate Athletic Association (MIAA) during the 2021 NCAA Division III football season. Under head coach Dan Musielewicz, the Comets compiled a 7–3 record (3–3 against conference opponents) and finished in a tie for fourth place in the MIAA.

| Date | Opponent | Site | Result | Attendance | Source |
|---|---|---|---|---|---|
| September 11 | at Eureka* | FioRito Stadium; Eureka, IL | W 42–23 | | |
| September 18 | Manchester (IN)* | Cutler Athletic Complex; Olivet, MI | W 59–7 | | |
| September 25 | at Milsaps* | Harper Davis Field; Jackson, MS | W 44–27 | | |
| October 2 | at Alma | Alma, MI | W 33–10 | | |
| October 9 | Trine | Cutler Athletic Complex; Olivet, MI | L 14–35 | | |
| October 16 | Hope | Cutler Athletic Complex; Olivet, MI | L 16–31 | | |
| October 23 | at Albion | Sprankle-Sprandel; Albion, MI | L 17–38 | | |
| October 30 | Kalamazoo | Cutler Athletic Complex; Olivet, MI | W 49–7 | | |
| November 6 | at Adrian | Docking Stadium; Adrian, MI | W 35–28 | | |
| November 13 | Finlandia* | Cutler Athletic Complex; Olivet, MI | W 79–6 | | |
*Non-conference game

=== Adrian ===
2021 Adrian Bulldogs football
- Conference: Michigan Intercollegiate Athletic Association
- Record: 5–5 (3–3 MIAA)
- Head coach: Jim Deere (11th season)
- Offensive coordinator: Harry Bailey (7th season)
- Home stadium: Docking Stadium

The 2021 Adrian Bulldogs football team represented Adrian College as a member of the Michigan Intercollegiate Athletic Association (MIAA) during the 2021 NCAA Division III football season. Under head coach Jim Deere, the Bulldogs compiled a 5–6 record (3–3 against conference opponents) and tied for fourth place in the MIAA.

| Date | Opponent | Site | Result | Attendance | Source |
|---|---|---|---|---|---|
| September 4 | Heidelberg* | Docking Stadium; Adrian, MI | L 20–48 | 2,950 | |
| September 11 | at Hanover* | Alumni Stadium; Hanover, IN | L 14–21 | 2,248 | |
| September 18 | Greenville*^{†} | Docking Stadium; Adrian, MI | W 41–28 | 4,500 | |
| September 25 | at Finlandia* | McAfee Field; Hancock, MI | W 56–6 | 602 | |
| October 2 | at Trine | Fred Zollner Athletic Complex; Angola, IN | L 20–36 | 5,980 | |
| October 9 | Albion | Docking Stadium; Adrian, MI | W 21–7 | 1,840 | |
| October 16 | Alma | Docking Stadium; Adrian, MI | W 36–21 | 2,006 | |
| October 23 | at Hope | Ray & Sue Smith Stadium; Holland, MI | L 7–19 | 2,510 | |
| November 6 | Olivet | Docking Stadium; Adrian, MI | L 28–35 | 1,856 | |
| November 13 | at Kalamazoo | Angell Field; Kalamazoo, MI | W 33–21 | 561 | |
*Non-conference game; ^{†}Homecoming

=== Alma ===
2021 Alma Scots football
- Conference: Michigan Intercollegiate Athletic Association
- Record: 5–5 (1–5 MIAA)
- Head coach: Jason Couch (4th season)
- Home stadium: Bahlke Field

The 2021 Alma Scots football team represented Alma College as a member of the Michigan Intercollegiate Athletic Association (MIAA) during the 2021 NCAA Division III football season. In their fourth season under head coach Jason Couch, the Scots compiled a 5–5 record (1–5 against conference opponents) and finished in sixth place in the MIAA.

| Date | Opponent | Site | Result | Attendance | Source |
|---|---|---|---|---|---|
| September 4 | Bluffton* | Bahlke Field; Alma, MI | W 24–6 | | |
| September 11 | at Manchester (IN)* | N. Manchester, IN | W 47–23 | | |
| September 18 | Anderson (IN)* | Bahlke Field; Alma, MI (Hall of Fame Game) | W 51–2 | | |
| September 25 | at Martin Luther* | New Ulm, MN | W 35–27 | | |
| October 2 | Olivet^{†} | Bahlke Field; Alma, MI | L 10–33 | | |
| October 9 | at Kalamazoo | Angell Field; Kalamazoo, MI | W 28–3 | | |
| October 16 | at Adrian | Adrian, MI | L 21–36 | | |
| October 30 | Hope | Bahlke Field; Alma, MI | L 3–27 | | |
| November 6 | Trine | Bahlke Field; Alma, MI | L 23–37 | | |
| November 13 | at Albion | Albion, MI | L 7–34 | | |
*Non-conference game; ^{†}Homecoming

=== Kalamazoo ===
2021 Kalamazoo Hornets football
- Conference: Michigan Intercollegiate Athletic Association
- Record: 1–9 (0–6 MIAA)
- Head coach: Jamie Zorbo (14th season)
- Home stadium: Angell Field

The 2021 Kalamazoo Hornets football team represented Kalamazoo College as a member of the Michigan Intercollegiate Athletic Association (MIAA) during the 2021 NCAA Division III football season. Under head coach Jamie Zorbo, the Hornets compiled a 1–9 record (0–6 against conference opponents) and finished in last place in the MIAA.

| Date | Opponent | Site | Result | Attendance | Source |
|---|---|---|---|---|---|
| September 4 | at Oberlin* | Knowlton Complex; Oberlin, OH | W 24–17 | | |
| September 11 | at Central (IA)* | Pella, IA | L 13–69 | | |
| September 18 | Bluffton* | Angell Field; Kalamazoo, MI | L 20–21 | | |
| September 25 | Alfred* | Angell Field; Kalamazoo, MI | L 7–10 | | |
| October 2 | at Hope | Ray & Sue Smith Stadium; Holland, MI | L 0–67 | | |
| October 9 | Alma | Angell Field; Kalamazoo, MI | L 3–28 | | |
| October 16 | Albion^{†} | Angell Field; Kalamazoo, MI | L 0–49 | | |
| October 23 | at Trine | Fred Zollner Athletic Complex; Angola, IN | L 13–47 | | |
| October 30 | at Olivet | Cutler Athletic Complex; Olivet, MI | L 7–49 | | |
| November 13 | Adrian | Angell Field; Kalamazoo, MI | L 21–33 | | |
*Non-conference game; ^{†}Homecoming
