= Alma Scots football, 2020–present =

American college football seasons

2020–present Alma Scots football
- Conference: Michigan Intercollegiate Athletic Association
- Head coach: Jason Couch (2018–present)

The Alma Scots football program, 2020–present represented Alma College from 2020 to the present in NCAA Division II college football as a member of the Michigan Intercollegiate Athletic Association (MIAA). The team has been led by head coach Jason Couch since 2018.

Highlights of the decade included:

- The 2022 team won the MIAA championship, advanced to the second round of the NCAA Division III playoffs, and finished the season with an 11–1 record.
- The 2023 team won the program's second consecutive MIAA championship, advanced to the NCAA Division III quarterfinals, and finished the season with a 12–1 record.
- The 2024 team compiled an 8–2 record and finished in second place in the MIAA.

== 2020 ==
The 2020 season was cancelled due to the COVID-19 pandemic.

== 2021 ==
2021 Alma Scots football
- Conference: Michigan Intercollegiate Athletic Association
- Record: 5–5 (1–5 MIAA)
- Head coach: Jason Couch (4th season)
- Home stadium: Bahlke Field

The 2021 Alma Scots football team represented Alma College as a member of the Michigan Intercollegiate Athletic Association (MIAA) during the 2021 NCAA Division III football season. In their fourth season under head coach Jason Couch, the Scots compiled a 5–5 record (1–5 against conference opponents) and finished in sixth place in the MIAA.

=== Schedule ===
Date	Opponent	Site	Result	Attendance	Source
September 4	Bluffton*	Bahlke Field; Alma, MI	W 24–6		
September 11	at Manchester (IN)*	N. Manchester, IN	W 47–23		
September 18	Anderson (IN)*	Bahlke Field; Alma, MI (Hall of Fame Game)	W 51–2		
September 25	at Martin Luther*	New Ulm, MN	W 35–27		
October 2	Olivet^{†}	Bahlke Field; Alma, MI	L 10–33		
October 9	at Kalamazoo	Angell Field; Kalamazoo, MI	W 28–3		
October 16	at Adrian	Adrian, MI	L 21–36		
October 30	Hope	Bahlke Field; Alma, MI	L 3–27		
November 6	Trine	Bahlke Field; Alma, MI	L 23–37		
November 13	at Albion	Albion, MI	L 7–34		
*Non-conference game; ^{†}Homecoming

== 2022 ==
2022 Alma Scots football

MIAA champion

NCAA Division III Second Round, L 26–48 vs. Aurora
- Conference: Michigan Intercollegiate Athletic Association

Ranking
- AFCA: No. 23
- Record: 11–1 (6–0 MIAA)
- Head coach: Jason Couch (5th season)
- Home stadium: Bahlke Field

2022 Michigan Intercollegiate Athletic Association football standings
	Conf.			Overall
Team	W		L	W		L
No. 18 Alma $^	6	–	0	11	–	1
Albion	5	–	1	9	–	1
Trine	3	–	3	7	–	3
Hope	3	–	3	6	–	4
Adrian	3	–	3	6	–	4
Olivet	1	–	5	5	–	5
Kalamazoo	0	–	6	3	–	7
$ – Conference champion; ^ – NCAA Division III playoff participant; Rankings from AFCA Poll

The 2022 Alma Scots football team represented the Alma College as a member of the Michigan Intercollegiate Athletic Association (MIAA) during the 2022 NCAA Division III football season. In their fifth season under head coach Jason Couch, the Scots compiled an 11–1 record (6–0 against conference opponents), won the MIAA championship, and were ranked No. 23 nationally at the end of the regular season.

The team's statistical leaders included Carter St. John with 2,593 passing yards, Eddie Williams with 1,184 rushing yards and 90 points scored, Nathan Goralski with 52 receptions, Devon Frenchko with 574 receiving yards, and Odin Soffredine with 114 total tackles.

=== Schedule ===
Date	Opponent	Site	Result	Attendance	Source
September 3	at Ohio Northern*	Dial Roberson Stadium; Ada, OH	W 16–13 ^{OT}	1,673	
September 10	Manchester (IN)*	Bahlke Field; Alma, MI	W 49–7	1,876	
September 17	at Anderson (IN)*	Macholz Stadium; Anderson, IN	W 45–7	750	
September 24	Martin Luther*	Bahlke Field; Alma, MI	W 69–0	3,035	
October 1	at Trine	Fred Zollner Athletic Stadium; Angola, IN	W 40–21	5,976	
October 15	Hope	Bahlke Field; Alma, MI	W 28–26		
October 22	at Kalamazoo	Angell Field; Kalamazoo, MI	W 45–21	1,400	
October 29	at Olivet	Cutler Athletic Complex; Olivet, MI	W 49–35	2,225	
November 5	Adrian	Bahlke Field; Alma, MI	W 30–10	1,700	
November 12	Albion	Bahlke Field; Alma, MI	W 34–31	4,405	
November 19	Mount St. Joseph*	Bahlke Field; Alma, MI (NCAA Division III First Round)	W 41–21	1,587	
November 26	Aurora*	Bahlke Field; Alma, MI (NCAA Division Second Round)	L 26–48	1,636	
*Non-conference game

== 2023 ==
2023 Alma Scots football

MIAA champion

NCAA Division III quarterfinal, L 41–58 vs. Cortland
- Conference: Michigan Intercollegiate Athletic Association

Ranking
- AFCA: No. 7
- Record: 12–1 (6–0 MIAA)
- Head coach: Jason Couch (6th season)
- Home stadium: Bahlke Field

2023 Michigan Intercollegiate Athletic Association football standings
	Conf.			Overall
Team	W		L	W		L
No. 6 Alma $^	6	–	0	12	–	1
Hope	5	–	1	8	–	2
Trine	4	–	2	6	–	4
Albion	3	–	3	7	–	3
Olivet	2	–	4	4	–	6
Kalamazoo	1	–	5	5	–	5
Adrian	0	–	6	1	–	9
$ – Conference champion; ^ – NCAA Division III playoff participant; Rankings from D3Football.com

The 2023 Alma Scots football team represented Alma College as a member of the Michigan Intercollegiate Athletic Association (MIAA) during the 2023 NCAA Division III football season. In their sixth season under head coach Jason Couch, the Scots compiled an 12–1 record (6–0 against conference opponents), won the MIAA championship, and were ranked No. 11 nationally at the end of the regular season. They advanced to the Division III playoffs where they won games in the first and second rounds, but lost to Cortland in the quarterfinals.

The team's statistical leaders included quarterback Carter St. John with 3,323 passing yards, Eddie Williams with 686 rushing yards, Zach Poff with 90 points scored, Devon Frenchko with 1,259 receiving yards, and Odin Soffredine with 104 total tackles.

=== Schedule ===
Date	Opponent	Site	Result	Attendance	Source
September 2	Ohio Northern*	Bahlke Field; Alma, MI	W 52–7	2,463	
September 9	at Manchester*	Spartan Stadium; North Manchester, IN	W 68–0	250	
September 16	Anderson*	Bahlke Field; Alma, MI	W 60–14	1,485	
September 23	at Wittenberg*	Edwards-Maurer Field; Springfield, OH	W 48–28	1,527	
September 30	Trine	Bahlke Field; Alma, MI	W 70–30	2,132	
October 14	at Hope	Ray & Sue Smith Stadium; Holland, MI	W 35–17	2,870	
October 21	Kalamazoo	Bahlke Field; Alma, MI	W 43–10	1,741	
October 28	Olivet	Bahlke Field; Alma, MI	W 41–20	1,859	
November 4	at Adrian	Docking Stadium; Adrian, MI	W 45–24	1,946	
November 11	at Albion	Sprankle-Sprandel; Albion, MI	W 50–14	1,450	
November 18	DePauw	Bahlke Field; Alma, MI	W 32–17	1,975	
November 25	at Mount Union	Kehres Stadium; Alliance, OH	W 24–20	1,785	
December 2	Cortland	Bahlke Field; Alma, MI	L 41–58	2,542	
*Non-conference game

== 2024 ==
2024 Alma Scots football
- Conference: Michigan Intercollegiate Athletic Association
- Record: 8–2 (6–1 MIAA)
- Head coach: Jason Couch (7th season)
- Home stadium: Bahlke Field

2024 Michigan Intercollegiate Athletic Association football standings
	Conf.			Overall
Team	W		L	W		L
No. 16 Hope $^	7	–	0	11	–	1
Alma	6	–	1	8	–	2
Albion	5	–	2	7	–	3
Trine	4	–	3	6	–	4
Adrian	3	–	4	6	–	4
Olivet	2	–	5	3	–	7
Kalamazoo	1	–	6	4	–	6
Calvin	0	–	7	2	–	8
$ – Conference champion; ^ – NCAA Division III playoff participant; Rankings from D3Football.com

The 2024 Alma Scots football team represented Alma College as a member of the Michigan Intercollegiate Athletic Association (MIAA) during the 2024 NCAA Division III football season. In their seventh season under head coach Jason Couch, the Scots compiled an 8–2 record (6–1 in conference games) and finished in second place in the MIAA.

== 2025 ==
2025 Alma Scots football

MIAA champion

NCAA Division III Second Round, L 7–24 at Wisconsin–Platteville
- Conference: Michigan Intercollegiate Athletic Association
- Record: 8–3 (7–0 MIAA)
- Head coach: Jason Couch (9th season)
- Home stadium: Bahlke Field

2025 Michigan Intercollegiate Athletic Association football standings
	Conf.			Overall
Team	W		L	W		L
No. 24 Alma $^	7	–	0	8	–	3
No. 19 Hope ^	6	–	1	9	–	2
Adrian	5	–	2	8	–	2
Calvin	4	–	3	7	–	3
Trine	3	–	4	5	–	5
Kalamazoo	1	–	6	4	–	6
Albion	1	–	6	3	–	7
Olivet	1	–	6	1	–	9
$ – Conference champion; ^ – NCAA Division III playoff participant; Rankings from D3Football.com

The 2025 Alma Scots football team represent Alma College as a member of the Michigan Intercollegiate Athletic Association (MIAA) during the 2025 NCAA Division III football season. In their eighth season under head coach Jason Couch, the Scots have compiled a 8–3 record (7–0 in conference games). They sustained non-conference losses against Wisconsin-River Falls (33-45) and Hanover (23-24).

=== Schedule ===
Date	Opponent	Rank	Site	TV	Result	Attendance	Source
September 6	at No. 19 Wisconsin-River Falls*		Smith Stadium at Ramer Field; River Falls, WI		L 33–45	1,684	
September 13	Denison*		Bahlke Field; Alma, MI		W 53–27	1,845	
September 20	Hanover*		Bahlke Field; Alma, MI		L 23–24	1,668	
September 27	at No. 15 Hope		Ray & Sue Smith Stadium; Holland, MI		W 29–26 ^{OT}	3,206	
October 4	Calvin^{†}		Bahlke Field; Alma, MI		W 55–6	3,127	
October 18	at Albion		Sprankle-Sprandel Stadium; Albion, MI (rivalry)		W 48–27	4,256	
October 25	at Olivet		Cutler Athletic Complex; Olivet, MI		W 53–21	1,875	
November 1	at Trine		Fred Zollner Athletic Stadium; Angola, IN		W 42–28	3,013	
November 8	Kalamazoo		Bahlke Field; Alma, MI		W 53–3	1,343	
November 15	Adrian		Bahlke Field; Alma, MI		W 35–34	2,230	
November 29	at No. 10 Wisconsin–Platteville*	No. 23	Ralph E. Davis Pioneer Stadium; Platteville, WI (NCAA Division III Second Round)	ESPN+	L 7–24	619	
*Non-conference game; ^{†}Homecoming; Rankings from D3Football.com Poll released prior to the game
