= Travis Rundle =

American football coach (born c. 1979)

Biographical details
- Born: c. 1979 (age 46–47)
- Education: Albion College (2002)

Playing career
- 1998–2001: Albion
- Position: Quarterback

Coaching career (HC unless noted)
- 2002: Albion (GA)
- 2003: Saint Mary's (LB)
- 2004–2006: Penn State (GA)
- 2007–2010: Penn State (DQC)
- 2011–2016: Illinois Wesleyan (DC/LB)
- 2017–2022: Sewanee
- 2023–2026: Albion

Head coaching record
- Overall: 26–59

Accomplishments and honors

Awards
- First Team All-MIAA (2001); Second Team All-MIAA (2000)

Travis Rundle (born c. 1979) is an American college football coach. He is the head football coach for Albion College, a position he has held since 2023. He was the head football coach for Sewanee: The University of the South from 2017 to 2022. He also coached for Saint Mary's, Penn State, and Illinois Wesleyan. He played college football for Albion as a quarterback.

== Head coaching record ==
Year	Team	Overall	Conference	Standing	Bowl/playoffs
Sewanee Tigers (Southern Athletic Association) (2017–2022)
2017	Sewanee	3–7	2–6	T–6th	
2018	Sewanee	4–6	3–5	T–5th	
2019	Sewanee	0–10	0–8	9th	
2020–21	Sewanee	0–1	0–0	N/A	
2021	Sewanee	0–10	0–7	8th	
2022	Sewanee	2–8	0–7	8th	
Sewanee:		9–42	5–33		
Albion Britons (Michigan Intercollegiate Athletic Association) (2023–2026)
2023	Albion	7–3	3–3	4th	
2024	Albion	7–3	5–2	3rd	
2025	Albion	3–7	1–6	T–6th	
2026	Albion	0–4 (Note: Albion fired Rundle after 4 games.)	0–1		
Albion:		17–17	9–12		
Total:		26–59			
