= Frank Ballenger =

American football coach

Biographical details
- Born: February 14, 1903; Cambridge, Ohio, U.S.
- Died: June 14, 1984 (aged 81); Sun City Center, Florida, U.S.

Coaching career (HC unless noted)

Football
- 1936–1937: Adrian
- 1939–?: Ball State (assistant)

Basketball
- 1936–1938: Adrian
- 1939–?: Ball State (assistant)

Head coaching record
- Overall: 4–14 (football); 7–29 (basketball)

Accomplishments and honors

Championships
- Football; 1 MOCC (1936)

Frank Edward Ballenger (February 14, 1903 – June 14, 1984) was an American football, basketball, and track coach. Ballenger was the head football coach at Adrian College in Adrian, Michigan. He held that position for the 1936 and 1937 seasons. His coaching record at Adrian was 4–14. He received his bachelor of arts at Muskingum University. He was born in Cambridge, Ohio in on February 14, 1903.

Ballanger moved to Ball State Teachers College—now known as Ball State University—in 1939 and served there as an assistant football, basketball, and track coach and as an assistant professor of physical education. After serving in the United States Army Air Forces during World War II, he returned to Ball State before joining the faculty at Kent State University, where he remained until his retirement. Ballanger died on June 14, 1984, in Sun City Center, Florida.

== Head coaching record ==
=== Football ===
Year	Team	Overall	Conference	Standing	Bowl/playoffs
Adrian Bulldogs (Michigan-Ontario Collegiate Conference) (1936)
1936	Adrian	3–7		1st	
Adrian Bulldogs (Michigan Intercollegiate Athletic Association) (1937)
1937	Adrian	1–7			
Adrian:		4–14			
Total:		4–14			
National championship Conference title Conference division title or championship game berth
