= Ray & Sue Smith Stadium =

American football stadium in Holland, Michigan

Coordinates: 42.785638°N 86.089425°W

Ray & Sue Smith Stadium, formerly known as Holland Municipal Stadium, is a 5,322-seat American football stadium located in Holland, Michigan, US. Built in 1979, Hope College purchased Holland Municipal Stadium from the City of Holland in 2012 and renamed the facility, where the Flying Dutchmen play, to Ray & Sue Smith Stadium. The stadium is also used regularly for high school football, including home games for Holland High School. The stadium features two concession stands, restrooms, and a press box. It is adjacent to a municipal swimming pool; the stadium shares locker room facilities with the pool.

Hope College built the adjacent Lugers Fieldhouse in 1991. The Flying Dutchmen's locker rooms are located there, as are locker rooms for other sports and a sports medicine center.

It is also used for graduation ceremonies and other special events, including fireworks and the Tulip Time Festival.
