= Jason Couch (American football) =

American football coach

Biographical details
- Education: Alma College (B.S., 1997); Saginaw Valley State University (M.Ed., 2003)

Playing career
- 1993–1996: Alma
- Position: Center

Coaching career (HC unless noted)
- 1997–1998: Merrill HS (MI) (assistant)
- 1999–2000: Troy HS (MI) (assistant)
- 2001–2002: Romeo HS (MI) (assistant)
- 2003–2017: Romeo HS (MI) (co-HC/OC)
- 2018–2026: Alma

Head coaching record
- Overall: 56–32 (college)
- Tournaments: 3–3 (NCAA D-III playoffs)

Accomplishments and honors

Championships
- 1 MHSAA (2015); 3 MIAA (2022–2023, 2025)

Jason Couch is an American college football coach. He is the head football coach for Alma College, a position he has held since 2018.

Couch is known for wearing an Alma College Tartan kilt on the sidelines.

== Head coaching record ==
=== College ===
Year	Team	Overall	Conference	Standing	Bowl/playoffs	AFCA^{#}	D3^{°}
Alma Scots (Michigan Intercollegiate Athletic Association) (2018–2026)
2018	Alma	2–8	1–6	7th			
2019	Alma	6–4	4–3	T–4th			
2020–21	Alma	1–1	1–1	3rd			
2021	Alma	5–5	1–5	6th			
2022	Alma	11–1	6–0	1st	L NCAA Division III Second Round	18	22
2023	Alma	12–1	6–0	1st	L NCAA Division III Quarterfinal	7	6
2024	Alma	8–2	6–1	2nd			
2025	Alma	8–3	7–0	1st	L NCAA Division III Second Round	25	24
2026	Alma	3–7	3–4	T–4th			
Alma:		56–32	35–20				
Total:		56–32					
National championship Conference title Conference division title or championship game berth
