= 2020–21 NCAA Division III football season =

American college football season

2020 NCAA Division III football season
- Regular season: October 3, 2020 – May 1, 2021
- Playoffs: Not held
- Gagliardi Trophy: Not awarded

The 2020–21 NCAA Division III football season was the component of the 2020 college football season organized by the NCAA at the Division III level in the United States. Due to the COVID-19 pandemic, only a few games were played during the traditional fall season, including the annual Secretaries' Cup between Coast Guard and Merchant Marine on November 14, 2020. For other teams that chose to play during the 2020–21 school year, the regular season began on February 6, 2021 and culminated on May 1.

The season concluded with the end of the regular season, as the playoffs and championship game were not held due to the pandemic.

== Conference changes and new programs ==
=== Membership changes ===
| School | Former conference | New conference |
|---|---|---|
| Keystone Giants | Returning program, last competed 1947 | ECFC |
| MacMurray Highlanders | UMAC | College shut down before spring 2021 season |
| St. Norbert Green Knights (Note: Did not play during the spring 2021 season.) | Midwest | NACC |

== Conference standings ==
2020 American Rivers Conference football standings
| | Conf. | | | Overall |
| Team | W | | L | W | | L |
|---|---|---|---|---|---|---|
| Central $ | 2 | – | 0 | 2 | – | 0 |
| Loras | 1 | – | 0 | 2 | – | 0 |
| Dubuque | 1 | – | 0 | 1 | – | 0 |
| Coe | 0 | – | 1 | 0 | – | 1 |
| Luther | 0 | – | 1 | 0 | – | 1 |
| Nebraska Wesleyan | 0 | – | 1 | 0 | – | 1 |
| Simpson (IA) | 0 | – | 1 | 0 | – | 1 |
$ – Conference champion; Note: Buena Vista and Wartburg did not play due to COVID-19.

2020 American Southwest Conference football standings
| | Conf. | | | Overall |
| Team | W | | L | W | | L |
|---|---|---|---|---|---|---|
East Division
| Mary Hardin–Baylor xy$ | 4 | – | 0 | 5 | – | 0 |
| Belhaven | 2 | – | 2 | 3 | – | 2 |
| East Texas Baptist | 2 | – | 2 | 3 | – | 2 |
| Louisiana College | 2 | – | 2 | 2 | – | 3 |
| Southwestern (TX) | 0 | – | 4 | 0 | – | 4 |
West Division
| Hardin–Simmons xy | 4 | – | 0 | 4 | – | 1 |
| Texas Lutheran | 3 | – | 1 | 3 | – | 2 |
| Howard Payne | 2 | – | 2 | 2 | – | 3 |
| McMurry | 1 | – | 3 | 2 | – | 3 |
| Sul Ross | 0 | – | 4 | 1 | – | 4 |
Championship: Mary Hardin–Baylor 23, Hardin–Simmons 15
$ – Conference champion; x – Division champion/co-champions; y – Championship game participant

2020 College Conference of Illinois and Wisconsin football standings
| | Conf. | | | Overall |
| Team | W | | L | W | | L |
|---|---|---|---|---|---|---|
| Carthage $ | 2 | – | 0 | 2 | – | 0 |
| Illinois Wesleyan | 2 | – | 1 | 2 | – | 1 |
| Millikin | 2 | – | 1 | 2 | – | 1 |
| Augustana (IL) | 1 | – | 2 | 1 | – | 2 |
| North Park | 0 | – | 3 | 0 | – | 3 |
$ – Conference champion; Note: Carroll (WI), Elmhurst, North Central (IL), Washington University, and Wheaton (IL) did not play due to COVID-19.

2020 Empire 8 Athletic Conference football standings
| | Conf. | | | Overall |
| Team | W | | L | W | | L |
|---|---|---|---|---|---|---|
| Utica | 1 | – | 1 | 1 | – | 1 |
| Alfred | 1 | – | 1 | 1 | – | 1 |
Note: Brockport, Cortland, Hartwick, Morrisville State, and St. John Fisher did not compete due to COVID-19.

2020 Heartland Collegiate Athletic Conference football standings
| | Conf. | | | Overall |
| Team | W | | L | W | | L |
|---|---|---|---|---|---|---|
| Hanover $ | 4 | – | 0 | 4 | – | 0 |
| Mount St. Joseph | 5 | – | 1 | 5 | – | 1 |
| Rose–Hulman | 4 | – | 1 | 4 | – | 1 |
| Franklin | 4 | – | 3 | 4 | – | 3 |
| Bluffton | 3 | – | 4 | 4 | – | 4 |
| Defiance | 2 | – | 5 | 2 | – | 5 |
| Anderson (IN) | 1 | – | 4 | 1 | – | 4 |
| Manchester | 0 | – | 5 | 0 | – | 7 |
$ – Conference champion

2020 Michigan Intercollegiate Athletic Association football standings
| | Conf. | | | Overall |
| Team | W | | L | W | | L |
|---|---|---|---|---|---|---|
| Albion $ | 3 | – | 0 | 3 | – | 0 |
| Trine | 2 | – | 1 | 4 | – | 1 |
| Alma | 1 | – | 1 | 1 | – | 1 |
| Adrian | 2 | – | 2 | 3 | – | 4 |
| Olivet | 1 | – | 3 | 1 | – | 3 |
| Kalamazoo | 0 | – | 2 | 0 | – | 2 |
$ – Conference champion; Note: Finlandia and Hope did not play due to COVID-19.

2020 New Jersey Athletic Conference football standings
| | Conf. | | | Overall |
| Team | W | | L | W | | L |
|---|---|---|---|---|---|---|
| Salisbury $ | 2 | – | 0 | 2 | – | 0 |
| Wesley | 2 | – | 1 | 2 | – | 1 |
| Montclair State | 2 | – | 1 | 2 | – | 1 |
| William Paterson | 0 | – | 1 | 0 | – | 1 |
| Kean | 0 | – | 1 | 0 | – | 1 |
| Christopher Newport | 0 | – | 2 | 0 | – | 2 |
$ – Conference champion; Notes: Due to COVID-19, the New Jersey Athletic Conference suspended the fall 2020 football season. TCNJ and Rowan opted out of the spring season.

2020 North Coast Athletic Conference football standings
| | Conf. | | | Overall |
| Team | W | | L | W | | L |
|---|---|---|---|---|---|---|
| DePauw | 0 | – | 0 | 2 | – | 0 |
| Denison | 0 | – | 0 | 1 | – | 0 |
| Ohio Wesleyan | 0 | – | 0 | 0 | – | 2 |
Note: Wittenberg, Wabash, Wooster, Kenyon, Allegheny, Oberlin, and Hiram did not compete due to COVID-19 and no games played by DePauw, Denison, and Ohio Wesleyan against each other counted as conference games.

2020 Northern Athletics Collegiate Conference football standings
| | Conf. | | | Overall |
| Team | W | | L | W | | L |
|---|---|---|---|---|---|---|
| Lakeland + | 3 | – | 0 | 3 | – | 0 |
| Aurora + | 3 | – | 0 | 3 | – | 0 |
| Benedictine (IL) | 2 | – | 1 | 2 | – | 1 |
| Concordia (WI) | 1 | – | 2 | 3 | – | 2 |
| Eureka | 1 | – | 2 | 2 | – | 3 |
| Wisconsin Lutheran | 1 | – | 2 | 1 | – | 2 |
| Rockford | 1 | – | 2 | 1 | – | 3 |
| Concordia (IL) | 0 | – | 3 | 0 | – | 3 |
+ – Conference co-champions

2020 Northwest Conference football standings
| | Conf. | | | Overall |
| Team | W | | L | W | | L |
|---|---|---|---|---|---|---|
| Whitworth $ | 4 | – | 0 | 4 | – | 0 |
| Puget Sound | 2 | – | 2 | 2 | – | 2 |
| George Fox | 1 | – | 1 | 1 | – | 1 |
| Pacific (OR) | 1 | – | 1 | 1 | – | 1 |
| Pacific Lutheran | 0 | – | 4 | 0 | – | 4 |
$ – Conference champion; Note: Lewis & Clark, Linfield, and Willamette did not play due to COVID-19.; Rankings from D3football.com

2020 Ohio Athletic Conference football standings
| | Conf. | | | Overall |
| Team | W | | L | W | | L |
|---|---|---|---|---|---|---|
| Mount Union $ | 4 | – | 0 | 4 | – | 0 |
| Heidelberg | 4 | – | 1 | 4 | – | 1 |
| Ohio Northern | 3 | – | 1 | 3 | – | 1 |
| John Carroll | 2 | – | 1 | 2 | – | 1 |
| Marietta | 3 | – | 2 | 3 | – | 2 |
| Wilmington (OH) | 2 | – | 3 | 2 | – | 3 |
| Muskingum | 1 | – | 2 | 1 | – | 2 |
| Otterbein | 1 | – | 4 | 1 | – | 4 |
| Baldwin Wallace | 0 | – | 2 | 0 | – | 2 |
| Capital | 0 | – | 4 | 0 | – | 4 |
$ – Conference champion

2020 Old Dominion Athletic Conference football standings
| | Conf. | | | Overall |
| Team | W | | L | W | | L |
|---|---|---|---|---|---|---|
| Randolph–Macon $ | 4 | – | 0 | 5 | – | 0 |
| Emory & Henry | 3 | – | 0 | 3 | – | 1 |
| Hampden–Sydney | 3 | – | 1 | 4 | – | 1 |
| Ferrum | 2 | – | 2 | 2 | – | 3 |
| Bridgewater | 1 | – | 2 | 3 | – | 2 |
| Shenandoah | 1 | – | 2 | 1 | – | 4 |
| Southern Virginia | 0 | – | 3 | 1 | – | 3 |
| Guilford | 0 | – | 4 | 0 | – | 4 |
$ – Conference champion; Note: Washington and Lee did not compete due to COVID-19.

2020 Presidents' Athletic Conference football standings
| | Conf. | | | Overall |
| Team | W | | L | W | | L |
|---|---|---|---|---|---|---|
| Westminster (PA) $ | 4 | – | 0 | 5 | – | 0 |
| Washington & Jefferson | 2 | – | 1 | 3 | – | 1 |
| Grove City | 2 | – | 2 | 2 | – | 2 |
| Saint Vincent | 2 | – | 2 | 2 | – | 2 |
| Bethany (WV) | 1 | – | 1 | 1 | – | 2 |
| Carnegie Mellon | 1 | – | 2 | 2 | – | 2 |
| Geneva | 1 | – | 2 | 2 | – | 3 |
| Waynesburg | 0 | – | 3 | 0 | – | 5 |
$ – Conference champion; Note: Case Western Reserve and Thiel did not play due to COVID-19.

2020 Southern Athletic Association football standings
| | Conf. | | | Overall |
| Team | W | | L | W | | L |
|---|---|---|---|---|---|---|
| Berry $ | 4 | – | 0 | 4 | – | 0 |
| Hendrix | 3 | – | 1 | 3 | – | 1 |
| Trinity (TX) | 3 | – | 1 | 3 | – | 1 |
| Birmingham–Southern | 2 | – | 2 | 2 | – | 2 |
| Centre | 2 | – | 2 | 2 | – | 2 |
| Austin | 1 | – | 3 | 1 | – | 3 |
| Millsaps | 1 | – | 3 | 1 | – | 3 |
| Sewanee | 0 | – | 0 | 0 | – | 1 |
| Rhodes | 0 | – | 4 | 0 | – | 4 |
$ – Conference champion

2020 Upper Midwest Athletic Conference football standings
| | Conf. | | | Overall |
| Team | W | | L | W | | L |
|---|---|---|---|---|---|---|
| Martin Luther | 1 | – | 0 | 3 | – | 1 |
| Northwestern (MN) | 1 | – | 0 | 1 | – | 1 |
| Westminster (MO) | 2 | – | 1 | 2 | – | 1 |
| Greenville | 1 | – | 1 | 1 | – | 3 |
| Iowa Wesleyan | 1 | – | 2 | 1 | – | 2 |
| Minnesota–Morris | 0 | – | 2 | 0 | – | 2 |
Note: Crown and St. Scholastica did not compete due to COVID-19.

2020 USA South Athletic Conference football standings
| | Conf. | | | Overall |
| Team | W | | L | W | | L |
|---|---|---|---|---|---|---|
| Methodist $ | 3 | – | 0 | 4 | – | 1 |
| Brevard | 2 | – | 1 | 4 | – | 1 |
| Huntingdon | 2 | – | 1 | 3 | – | 1 |
| Averett | 1 | – | 1 | 1 | – | 3 |
| Greensboro | 0 | – | 1 | 1 | – | 2 |
| Maryville (TN) | 0 | – | 2 | 2 | – | 2 |
| North Carolina Wesleyan | 0 | – | 2 | 0 | – | 5 |
$ – Conference champion; Note: LaGrange did not play due to COVID-19.

=== Conferences that did not play ===
The following conferences did not hold a football season in fall 2020 or spring 2021.

- Centennial Conference – announced on December 10, 2020, that fall and winter sports would not be held during their respective seasons or during the spring.
- Commonwealth Coast Conference – announced on January 21, 2021, that all winter sports and previously cancelled sports seasons would not be held.
- Eastern Collegiate Football Conference – announced on July 14, 2020, that the football season would not be played.
- Liberty League – announced on November 9, 2020, that winter/spring sports and all previously postponed fall sports would not be played.
- Middle Atlantic Conference – announced on March 22, 2021, that the previously postponed football season would not be rescheduled for the spring.
- Massachusetts State Collegiate Athletic Conference – announced on January 22, 2021, that postponed fall sports would not be rescheduled for the spring.
- Minnesota Intercollegiate Athletic Conference – announced on March 3, 2021, that spring seasons for fall sports would not be held.
- Midwest Conference – announced on December 3, 2020, that fall and winter sports would be cancelled and not rescheduled.
- North Coast Athletic Conference – announced on October 16, 2020, that fall sports seasons would not be held.
- New England Small College Athletic Conference – announced on August 10, 2020, that fall sports seasons would not be held.
- New England Women's and Men's Athletic Conference – announced on July 17, 2020, that fall sports seasons would not be held. Coast Guard and Merchant Marine, both federal service academies and NEWMAC members (Coast Guard in all sports and Merchant Marine in football only), chose to play their rivalry game in November 2020, but did not play any other football games in 2020–21.
- Southern California Intercollegiate Athletic Conference – announced on December 1, 2020, that the fall and winter sports seasons that had previously been postponed would not be held.
- Wisconsin Intercollegiate Athletic Conference – announced on July 27, 2020, that the fall sports seasons would not be held.

== See also ==
- 2020 NCAA Division I FBS football season
- 2020–21 NCAA Division I FCS football season
- 2020–21 NCAA Division II football season
- 2020 NAIA football season
