= Joe Palka =

American football coach (born 1964)

Current position
- Title: Head coach
- Team: Adrian
- Conference: MIAA
- Record: 14–6

Biographical details
- Born: July 9, 1964 (age 62)
- Education: Eastern Michigan University (1987)

Playing career
- 1982: Grand Valley State
- 1983–1986: Eastern Michigan
- Position: Linebacker

Coaching career (HC unless noted)
- 1987: Montpelier HS (OH) (assistant)
- 1988–1989: Summerfield HS (MI)
- 1990–1993: Central Catholic HS (OH)
- 1994: Saint Joseph's (IN) (DC)
- 1995: Saint Joseph's (IN)
- 1996–1997: Bryan HS (OH)
- 2002–2003: Adrian (assistant)
- 2004–2005: Eastern Michigan (co-ST/DB)
- 2006–2012: Whitmer HS (OH)
- 2013–2023: Saline HS (MI)
- 2024–present: Adrian

Head coaching record
- Overall: 15–15 (college); 171–38 (high school: Saline & Whitmer)

Joseph Palka (born July 9, 1964) is an American college football coach. He is the head football coach for Adrian College, a position he has held since 2024. He was the head football coach for Summerfield High School from 1988 to 1989; Central Catholic High School from 1990 to 1993; Saint Joseph's College in Collegeville, Indiana, in 1995; Bryan High School from 1996 to 1997, Whitmer High School from 2006 to 2012, and Saline High School from 2013 to 2023. He also coached for Montpelier High School and Eastern Michigan. He played college football for Grand Valley State and Eastern Michigan as a linebacker.

== Head coaching record ==
=== College ===
Year	Team	Overall	Conference	Standing	Bowl/playoffs
Saint Joseph's Pumas (Midwest Intercollegiate Football Conference) (1995)
1995	Saint Joseph's	1–9	1–9	12th	
Saint Joseph's:		1–9	1–9		
Adrian Bulldogs (Michigan Intercollegiate Athletic Association) (2024–present)
2024	Adrian	6–4	3–4	5th	
2025	Adrian	8–2	5–2	3rd	
2026	Adrian	0–0	0–0		
Adrian:		14–6	8–6		
Total:		15–15			
