= Harry Bailey (American football) =

American football coach (born c. 1987)

Current position
- Title: Head coach
- Team: Addison HS (MI)
- Record: 0–0

Biographical details
- Born: c. 1987 (age 38–39); Hudson, Michigan, U.S.
- Education: Adrian College (2009)

Playing career
- 2005–2008: Adrian
- Position: Linebacker

Coaching career (HC unless noted)
- 2009–2010: Adrian (JV)
- 2011–2012: Adrian (LB)
- 2013: Adrian (co-DC/LB)
- 2014: Adrian (OC)
- 2015: Adrian (OC/QB)
- 2016–2023: Adrian (OC/RB)
- 2023: Adrian (interim HC)
- 2024–present: Addison HS (MI)

Head coaching record
- Overall: 0–3 (college); 0–0 (high school)

Accomplishments and honors

Awards
- First Team All-MIAA (2008)

Harry Bailey (born c. 1987) is an American college football coach. He is the head football coach for Addison High School, a position he has held since 2024. He was the interim head football coach for Adrian College in 2023 after serving as an assistant for fifteen seasons.

Bailey played college football for Adrian as a linebacker and was named First Team All-Michigan Intercollegiate Athletic Association (MIAA) in 2008.

== Head coaching record ==
=== College ===
Year	Team	Overall	Conference	Standing	Bowl/playoffs
Adrian Bulldogs (Michigan Intercollegiate Athletic Association) (2023)
2023	Adrian	0–3 (Note: Bailey was named interim head coach with three weeks remaining in the season following the resignation of Jim Deere.)	0–3	7th	
Adrian:		0–3	0–3		
Total:		0–3			

=== High school ===
Year	Team	Overall	Conference	Standing	Bowl/playoffs
Addison Panthers () (2024–present)
2024	Addison	0–0	0–0		
Addison:		0–0	0–0		
Total:		0–0			
