= 2025 NCAA Division III football rankings =

Rankings for the 2025 NCAA Division III football season

- Season: 2025
- Postseason: Single-elimination
- Preseason No. 1: North Central (IL)
- National champions: Wisconsin–River Falls
- Conference with most teams in final poll: WIAC (4)

Two human polls and a committee's selections comprise the 2025 National Collegiate Athletic Association (NCAA) Division III football rankings. Unlike in Division I's Football Bowl Subdivision (FBS), the NCAA, Division III college football's governing body, bestows a national championship on the winner of the Stagg Bowl – the championship round of a 40-team postseason tournament. The two main weekly polls that begin in the preseason are the D3football.com poll and the AFCA Coaches Poll, which rank the top 25 colleges in Division III football.

== Legend ==
| | Increase in ranking |
| | Decrease in ranking |
| | Not ranked previous week |
| | Selected for Division III Football Championship Playoffs |
| (#–#) | Win–loss record |
| (Italics) | Number of first place votes |
| т | Tied with team above or below also with this symbol |

== D3football.com poll ==
| | Preseason July 23 | Week 1 September 7 | Week 2 September 14 | Week 3 September 21 | Week 4 September 28 | Week 5 October 5 | Week 6 October 12 | Week 7 October 19 | Week 8 October 26 | Week 9 November 2 | Week 10 November 9 | Week 11 November 16 | Final January 5, 2026 | |
|---|---|---|---|---|---|---|---|---|---|---|---|---|---|---|
| 1. | North Central (IL) (24) | North Central (IL) (0–0) (23) | North Central (IL) (1–0) (22) | North Central (IL) (2–0) (22) | North Central (IL) (3–0) (22) | North Central (IL) (4–0) (23) | North Central (IL) (5–0) (23) | North Central (IL) (6–0) (23) | North Central (IL) (7–0) (24) | North Central (IL) (8–0) (25) | North Central (IL) (9–0) (25) | North Central (IL) (10–0) (25) | Wisconsin–River Falls (14–1) (25) | 1. |
| 2. | Mount Union (1) | Mount Union (1–0) (2) | Mount Union (2–0) (3) | Mount Union (2–0) (3) | Mount Union (3–0) (3) | Mount Union (4–0) (2) | Mount Union (5–0) (2) | Mount Union (6–0) (2) | Mount Union (7–0) (1) | Mount Union (8–0) | Mount Union (9–0) | Mount Union (10–0) | North Central (IL) (14–1) | 2. |
| 3. | Johns Hopkins | Johns Hopkins (1–0) | Johns Hopkins (2–0) | Johns Hopkins (3–0) | Johns Hopkins (3–0) | Johns Hopkins (4–0) | Johns Hopkins (5–0) | Johns Hopkins (6–0) | Johns Hopkins (7–0) | Johns Hopkins (8–0) | Johns Hopkins (9–0) | Wisconsin–River Falls (9–1) | Johns Hopkins (12–2) | 3. |
| 4. | Susquehanna | Susquehanna (1–0) | Susquehanna (2–0) | Saint John's (MN) (2–0) | Saint John's (MN) (3–0) | Wisconsin–La Crosse (3–0) | Wisconsin–La Crosse (4–0) | Salisbury (6–0) | Bethel (MN) (7–0) | Bethel (MN) (8–0) | Wisconsin–River Falls (8–1) | Bethel (MN) (10–0) | Bethel (MN) (12–1) | 4. |
| 5. | Saint John's (MN) | Saint John's (MN) (0–0) | Saint John's (MN) (1–0) | Wisconsin–La Crosse (2–0) | Wisconsin–La Crosse (2–0) | Salisbury (4–0) | Salisbury (5–0) | Bethel (MN) (6–0) | Salisbury (7–0) | Hardin–Simmons (8–0) | Bethel (MN) (9–0) | Wartburg (10–0) | John Carroll (12–2) | 5. |
| 6. | Hardin–Simmons | Hardin–Simmons (1–0) | Mary Hardin–Baylor (1–0) | Salisbury (2–0) | Salisbury (3–0) | Wisconsin–Platteville (4–0) | Bethel (MN) (5–0) | Hardin–Simmons (6–0) | Hardin–Simmons (7–0) | Wartburg (9–0) | Wartburg (9–0) | Christopher Newport (10–0) | Mount Union (11–1) | 6. |
| 7. | Salisbury | Mary Hardin–Baylor (1–0) | Salisbury (2–0) | Wartburg (3–0) | Wisconsin–Platteville (3–0) | Bethel (MN) (4–0) | Hardin–Simmons (5–0) | Wartburg (7–0) | Wartburg (8–0) | Salisbury (8–0) | Christopher Newport (9–0) | Saint John's (MN) (9–1) | Wheaton (IL) (11–3) | 7. |
| 8. | Mary Hardin–Baylor | Salisbury (1–0) | Hardin–Simmons (2–0) | Wisconsin–Platteville (3–0) | Wartburg (4–0) | Wartburg (5–0) | Wartburg (6–0) | Wisconsin–Platteville (5–1) | Wisconsin–Whitewater (6–1) | Wisconsin–River Falls (7–1) | Saint John's (MN) (8–1) | Johns Hopkins (9–1) | Wisconsin–La Crosse (8–3) | 8. |
| 9. | Wartburg | Wisconsin–La Crosse (0–0) | Wisconsin–La Crosse (1–0) | Hardin–Simmons (3–0) | Wisconsin–Whitewater (3–0) | Hardin–Simmons (4–0) | Wisconsin–Whitewater (4–1) | Wisconsin–Whitewater (5–1) | Wisconsin–River Falls (6–1) | Wisconsin–La Crosse (6–1) | John Carroll (8–1) | John Carroll (9–1) | Berry (11–2) | 9. |
| 10. | Cortland | Wartburg (1–0) | Wartburg (2–0) | Wisconsin–Whitewater (3–0) | Hardin–Simmons (3–0) | Wisconsin–Whitewater (3–1) | Saint John's (MN) (4–1) | Wisconsin–River Falls (5–1) | Wisconsin–La Crosse (5–1) | Saint John's (MN) (7–1) | Wisconsin–Platteville (7–2) | Wisconsin–Platteville (8–2) | Wisconsin–Platteville (9–3) | 10. |
| 11. | Wisconsin–La Crosse | Wisconsin–Platteville (1–0) | Wisconsin–Platteville (2–0) | Wisconsin–River Falls (3–0) | Wisconsin–River Falls (3–0) | Wisconsin–Oshkosh (3–1) | DePauw (5–0) | Saint John's (MN) (5–1) | Saint John's (MN) (6–1) | John Carroll (7–1) | Salisbury (8–1) | Wisconsin–Whitewater (8–2) | Saint John's (MN) (10–2) | 11. |
| 12. | Bethel (MN) | Bethel (MN) (0–0) | Wisconsin–River Falls (2–0) | Bethel (MN) (2–0) | Bethel (MN) (3–0) | DePauw (5–0) | Wisconsin–River Falls (4–1) | Wisconsin–La Crosse (4–1) | John Carroll (7–1) | Wisconsin–Platteville (6–2) | Wisconsin–Whitewater (7–2) | Salisbury (9–1) | Wartburg (10–1) | 12. |
| 13. | Springfield | Wisconsin–River Falls (1–0) | Bethel (MN) (1–0) | Susquehanna (2–1) | DePauw (4–0) | Saint John's (MN) (3–1) | Wisconsin–Platteville (4–1) | John Carroll (6–1) | Wisconsin–Platteville (5–2) | Christopher Newport (8–0) | Hardin–Simmons (8–1) | Wisconsin–La Crosse (7–2) | Susquehanna (11–3) | 13. |
| 14. | DePauw | DePauw (1–0) | DePauw (2–0) | DePauw (3–0) | Wheaton (IL) (2–1) | Wisconsin–River Falls (3–1) | John Carroll (5–1) | Central (IA) (6–0) | Christopher Newport (7–0) | Wisconsin–Whitewater (6–2) | Wisconsin–La Crosse (6–2) | Hardin–Simmons (9–1) | DePauw (10–2) | 14. |
| 15. | Wisconsin–Platteville | Grove City (1–0) | Hope (2–0) | Hope (3–0) | Wisconsin–Oshkosh (2–1) | John Carroll (4–1) | Central (IA) (5–0) | Christopher Newport (6–0) | DePauw (6–1) | DePauw (7–1) | DePauw (8–1) | DePauw (9–1) | Salisbury (10–2) | 15. |
| 16. | Linfield | Wisconsin–Oshkosh (1–0) | Wisconsin–Whitewater (2–0) | Mary Hardin–Baylor (1–1) | John Carroll (3–1) | Trinity (TX) (4–0) | Carnegie Mellon (3–2) | Carnegie Mellon (4–2) | Hope (6–1) | Hope (7–1) | Hope (8–1) | Franklin & Marshall (9–1) | Trinity (TX) (10–2) | 16. |
| 17. | Wheaton (IL) | Carnegie Mellon (1–0) | Grove City (1–1) | Wheaton (IL) (1–1) | Carnegie Mellon (2–1) | Carnegie Mellon (3–1) | Christopher Newport (5–0) | DePauw (5–1) | Berry (6–1) | Berry (7–1) | Berry (8–1) | Berry (9–1) | Christopher Newport (10–1) | 17. |
| 18. | Carnegie Mellon | Hope | Wheaton (IL) (0–1) | Grove City (1–1) | Trinity (TX) (3–0) | Central (IA) (5–0) | Wisconsin–Oshkosh (3–2) | Wisconsin–Oshkosh (4–2) | Central (IA) (6–1) | Wheaton (IL) (6–2) | Wheaton (IL) (7–2) | Hope (9–1) | Wisconsin–Whitewater (8–3) | 18. |
| 19. | Wisconsin–River Falls | Randolph-Macon (1–0) | Wisconsin–Oshkosh (1–1) | Wisconsin–Oshkosh (2–1) | Central (IA) (4–0) | Wheaton (IL) (2–2) | Hope (4–1) | Hope (5–1) | Wheaton (IL) (5–2) | Central (IA) (7–1) | Central (IA) (8–1) | Wheaton (IL) (8–2) | Hope (9–2) | 19. |
| 20. | Hope | John Carroll (1–0) | Berry (2–0) | Carnegie Mellon (2–1) | Hope (3–1) | Hope (4–1) | Wisconsin–Stout (4–1) | Wheaton (IL) (4–2) | Cortland (6–1) | Cortland (7–1) | Cortland (8–1) | Randolph–Macon (9–1) | Hardin–Simmons (9–2) | 20. |
| 21. | Randolph–Macon | Wisconsin–Whitewater (1–0) | John Carroll (1–1) | John Carroll (2–1) | Mary Hardin–Baylor (1–2) | Christopher Newport (4–0) | Wheaton (IL) (3–2) | Berry (5–1) | Randolph–Macon (7–1) | Randolph–Macon (8–1) | Randolph–Macon (8–1) | Trinity (TX) (9–1) | Eastern (PA) (10–2) | 21. |
| 22. | Aurora | Wheaton (IL) (0–1) | Carnegie Mellon (1–1) | Trinity (TX) (3–0) | Cortland (3–1) | Mary Hardin–Baylor (2–2) | Berry (4–1) | Cortland (5–1) | Baldwin Wallace (6–1) | Baldwin Wallace (7–1) | Trinity (TX) (8–1) | Susquehanna (8–2) | Randolph–Macon (9–2) | 22. |
| 23. | Grove City | Cortland (0–1) | Trinity (TX) (2–0) | Central (IA) (3–0) | Christopher Newport (3–0) | Cortland (4–1) | Cortland (4–1) | Randolph–Macon (6–1) | Wisconsin–Stout (5–2) | Trinity (TX) (7–1) | Susquehanna (7–2) | Alma (8–2) | Franklin & Marshall (9–2) | 23. |
| 24. | Wisconsin–Whitewater | Whitworth (1–0) | Cortland (1–1) | Cortland (2–1) | Hampden–Sydney (4–0) | Linfield (2–1) | Linfield (3–1) | Wisconsin–Stout (4–2) | Muhlenburg (6–1) | Susquehanna (6–2) | Wabash (8–1) | Coe (8–2) | Alma (8–3) | 24. |
| 25. | John Carroll | Berry (1–0) | Brockport (2–0) | Berry (2–1) | Susquehanna (2–2) | Muhlenberg (4–0) | Randolph–Macon (5–1) | Adrian (6–0) | Wisconsin–Oshkosh (4–3) | Wabash (7–1) | Franklin & Marshall (8–1) | Monmouth (IL) (9–1) | Coe (9–3) | 25. |
| | Preseason July 23 | Week 1 September 7 | Week 2 September 14 | Week 3 September 21 | Week 4 September 28 | Week 5 October 5 | Week 6 October 12 | Week 7 October 19 | Week 8 October 26 | Week 9 November 2 | Week 10 November 9 | Week 11 November 16 | Final January 5, 2026 | |
| | | Dropped: No. 13 Springfield (0–1); No. 16 Linfield (0–1); No. 22 Aurora (0–1) | Dropped: No. 19 Randolph–Macon (1–1); No. 24 Whitworth (1–1) | Dropped: No. 25 Brockport (2–1) | Dropped: No. 18 Grove City (1–2); No. 25 Berry (2–1) | Dropped: No. 24 Hampden–Sydney (4–1); No. 25 Susquehanna (2–2) | Dropped: No. 16 Trinity (TX); No. 22 Mary Hardin–Baylor; No. 25 Muhlenberg | Dropped: No. 24 Linfield | Dropped: No. 16 Carnegie Mellon; No. 25 Adrian | Dropped: No. 23 Wisconsin–Stout; No. 24 Muhlenburg; No. 25 Wisconsin–Oshkosh | Dropped: No. 22 Baldwin Wallace | Dropped: No. 19 Central; No. 20 Cortland; No. 24 Wabash | Dropped: No. 25 Monmouth | |

== AFCA Coaches Poll ==
| | Preseason August 18 | Week 1 September 8 | Week 2 September 15 | Week 3 September 22 | Week 4 September 29 | Week 5 October 6 | Week 6 October 13 | Week 7 October 20 | Week 8 October 27 | Week 9 November 3 | Week 10 November 10 | Week 11 November 17 | Final January 5, 2026 | |
|---|---|---|---|---|---|---|---|---|---|---|---|---|---|---|
| 1. | North Central (IL) (51) | North Central (IL) (0–0) (51) | North Central (IL) (1–0) (51) | North Central (IL) (2–0) (52) | North Central (IL) (3–0) (51) | North Central (IL) (4–0) (51) | North Central (IL) (5–0) (52) | North Central (IL) (6–0) (52) | North Central (IL) (7–0) (52) | North Central (IL) (8–0) (52) | North Central (IL) (9–0) (52) | North Central (IL) (10–0) (52) | Wisconsin–River Falls (14–1) (51) | 1. |
| 2. | Mount Union | Mount Union (1–0) (1) | Mount Union (2–0) | Mount Union (2–0) | Mount Union (3–0) | Mount Union (4–0) | Mount Union (5–0) | Mount Union (6–0) | Mount Union (7–0) | Mount Union (8–0) | Mount Union (9–0) | Mount Union (10–0) | North Central (IL) (14–1) | 2. |
| 3. | Johns Hopkins | Johns Hopkins (1–0) | Johns Hopkins (2–0) | Johns Hopkins (3–0) | Johns Hopkins (3–0) | Johns Hopkins (4–0) | Johns Hopkins (5–0) | Johns Hopkins (6–0) | Johns Hopkins (7–0) | Johns Hopkins (8–0) | Johns Hopkins (9–0) | Bethel (MN) (10–0) | John Carroll (12–2) | 3. |
| 4. | Saint John's (MN) | Saint John's (MN) (0–0) | Saint John's (MN) (1–0) | Saint John's (MN) (2–0) | Saint John's (MN) (3–0) | Wisconsin–La Crosse (3–0) | Wisconsin–La Crosse (4–0) | Salisbury (6–0) | Salisbury (7–0) | Salisbury (8–0) | Bethel (MN) (9–0) | Wisconsin–River Falls (9–1) | Johns Hopkins (12–2) | 4. |
| 5. | Susquehanna | Susquehanna (1–0) | Susquehanna (2–0) | Salisbury (2–0) | Wisconsin–La Crosse (2–0) | Salisbury (4–0) | Salisbury (5–0) | Hardin–Simmons (6–0) | Hardin–Simmons (7–0) | Hardin–Simmons (8–0) | Wisconsin–River Falls (8–1) | Wartburg (10–0) | Bethel (MN) (12–1) | 5. |
| 6. | Hardin–Simmons | Hardin–Simmons (1–0) | Salisbury (2–0) | Wisconsin–La Crosse (2–0) | Salisbury (3–0) | Hardin–Simmons (4–0) | Hardin–Simmons (5–0) | Bethel (MN) (6–0) | Bethel (MN) (7–0) | Bethel (MN) (8–0) | Wartburg (9–0) | Saint John's (MN) (9–1) | Mount Union (11–1) | 6. |
| 7. | Salisbury | Salisbury (1–0) | Hardin–Simmons (2–0) | Hardin–Simmons (3–0) | Hardin–Simmons (3–0) | Wisconsin–Platteville (4–0) | Bethel (MN) (5–0) | Wartburg (7–0) | Wartburg (8–0) | Wartburg (9–0) | Saint John's (MN) (8–1) | Christopher Newport (10–0) | Wheaton (IL) (11–3) | 7. |
| 8. | Mary Hardin–Baylor | Mary Hardin–Baylor (1–0) | Wisconsin–La Crosse (1–0) | Wisconsin–Platteville (3–0) | Wisconsin–Platteville (3–0) | Bethel (MN) (4–0) | Wartburg (6–0) | Wisconsin–Whitewater (5–1) | Wisconsin–Whitewater (6–1) | Wisconsin–River Falls (7–1) | Christopher Newport (9–0) | John Carroll (9–1) | Saint John's (MN) (10–2) | 8. |
| 9. | Wartburg | Wisconsin–La Crosse (0–0) | Mary Hardin–Baylor (1–0) | Wartburg (3–0) | Wartburg (4–0) | Wartburg (5–0) | DePauw (5–0) | Wisconsin–Platteville (5–1) | Wisconsin–River Falls (6–1) | Saint John's (MN) (7–1) | John Carroll (8–1) | Salisbury (9–1) | Berry (11–2) | 9. |
| 10. | Wisconsin–La Crosse | Wartburg (1–0) | Wisconsin–Platteville (2–0) | Wisconsin–Whitewater (3–0) | Wisconsin–Whitewater (3–0) | DePauw (5–0) | Wisconsin–Whitewater (4–1) | Wisconsin–River Falls (5–1) | Saint John's (MN) (6–1) | Wisconsin–La Crosse (6–1) | Salisbury (8–1) | DePauw (9–1) | Wisconsin–La Crosse (8–3) | 10. |
| 11. | Cortland | Wisconsin–Platteville (1–0) | Wartburg (2–0) | Bethel (MN) (2–0) | Bethel (MN) (3–0) | Saint John's (MN) (3–1) | Saint John's (MN) (4–1) | Saint John's (MN) (5–1) | Wisconsin–La Crosse (5–1) | John Carroll (7–1) | DePauw (8–1) | Johns Hopkins (9–1) | Wisconsin–Platteville (9–3) | 11. |
| 12. | Bethel (MN) | Bethel (MN) (0–0) | Bethel (MN) (1–0) | Wisconsin–River Falls (3–0) | Wisconsin–River Falls (3–0) | Wisconsin–Whitewater (3–1) | Wisconsin–River Falls (4–1) | Wisconsin–La Crosse (4–1) | John Carroll (7–1) | Christopher Newport (8–0) | Hardin–Simmons (8–1) | Hardin–Simmons (9–1) | Salisbury (10–2) | 12. |
| 13. | Springfield | DePauw (1–0) | Wisconsin–River Falls (2–0) | DePauw (3–0) | DePauw (4–0) | Trinity (TX) (4–0) | Central (IA) (5–0) | John Carroll (6–1) | Christopher Newport (7–0) | DePauw (7–1) | Wisconsin–Platteville (7–2) | Wisconsin–Platteville (8–2) | DePauw (10–2) | 13. |
| 14. | Wisconsin–Platteville | Wisconsin–River Falls (1–0) | DePauw (2–0) | Susquehanna (2–1) | Trinity (TX) (3–0) | Wisconsin–Oshkosh (3–1) | Wisconsin–Platteville (4–1) | Central (IA) (6–0) | DePauw (6–1) | Wisconsin–Platteville (6–2) | Cortland (8–1) | Wisconsin–Whitewater (8–2) | Wartburg (10–1) | 14. |
| 15. | Linfield | Grove City (1–0) | Hope (2–0) | Hope (3–0) | Wheaton (IL) (2–1) | Carnegie Mellon (3–1) | John Carroll (5–1) | Christopher Newport (6–0) | Wisconsin–Platteville (5–2) | Cortland (7–1) | Hope (8–1) | Hope (9–1) | Susquehanna (11–3) | 15. |
| 16. | DePauw | Carnegie Mellon (1–0) | Wisconsin–Whitewater (2–0) | Trinity (TX) (3–0) т | Carnegie Mellon (2–1) | Central (IA) (5–0) | Christopher Newport (5–0) | DePauw (5–1) | Cortland (6–1) | Hope (7–1) | Wisconsin–Whitewater (7–2) | Wisconsin–La Crosse (7–2) | Trinity (TX) (10–2) | 16. |
| 17. | Wheaton (IL) | Hope (1–0) | Grove City (1–1) | Wheaton (IL) (1–1) т | Wisconsin–Oshkosh (2–1) | Wisconsin–River Falls (3–1) | Cortland (4–1) | Cortland (5–1) | Hope (6–1) | Wisconsin–Whitewater (6–2) | Wisconsin–La Crosse (6–2) | Randolph–Macon (9–1) | Hope (9–2) | 17. |
| 18. | Carnegie Mellon | Wisconsin–Oshkosh (1–0) | Wheaton (IL) (0–1) | Mary Hardin–Baylor (1–1) | Central (IA) (4–0) | John Carroll (4–1) | Hope (4–1) | Hope (5–1) | Randolph–Macon (7–1) | Randolph–Macon (8–1) | Randolph–Macon (8–1) | Franklin & Marshall (9–1) | Christopher Newport (10–1) | 18. |
| 19. | Wisconsin–River Falls | Wisconsin–Whitewater (1–0) | Trinity (TX) (2–0) | Grove City (1–1) | John Carroll (3–1) | Cortland (4–1) | Carnegie Mellon (3–2) | Carnegie Mellon (4–2) | Central (IA) (6–1) | Central (IA) (7–1) | Central (IA) (8–1) | Berry (9–1) | Hardin–Simmons (9–2) | 19. |
| 20. | Hope | Randolph–Macon (1–0) | Carnegie Mellon (1–1) | Carnegie Mellon (2–1) | Cortland (3–1) | Hope (4–1) | Randolph–Macon (5–1) | Randolph–Macon (6–1) | Berry (6–1) | Berry (7–1) | Berry (8–1) | Wheaton (IL) (8–2) | Wisconsin–Whitewater (8–3) | 20. |
| 21. | Randolph–Macon | John Carroll (1–0) | Wisconsin–Oshkosh (1–1) | Wisconsin–Oshkosh (2–1) | Hampden–Sydney (4–0) | Christopher Newport (4–0) | Berry (4–1) | Berry (5–1) | Wheaton (IL) (5–2) | Wheaton (IL) (6–2) | Wheaton (IL) (7–2) | Trinity (TX) (9–1) | Randolph–Macon (9–2) | 21. |
| 22. | Wisconsin–Whitewater | Wheaton (IL) (0–1) | Berry (2–0) | John Carroll (2–1) | Mary Hardin–Baylor (1–2) | Mary Hardin–Baylor (2–2) | Wheaton (IL) (3–2) | Wheaton (IL) (4–2) | Trinity (TX) (6–1) | Trinity (TX) (7–1) | Trinity (TX) (8–1) | Cortland (8–2) | Franklin & Marshall (9–2) | 22. |
| 23. | Grove City | Cortland (0–1) | John Carroll (1–1) | Central (IA) (3–0) | Hope (3–1) | Muhlenberg (4–0) | Trinity (TX) (4–1) | Trinity (TX) (5–1) | Wabash (6–1) | Wabash (7–1) | Wabash (8–1) | Monmouth (IL) (9–1) | Eastern (PA) (10–2) | 23. |
| 24. | Aurora | Linfield (0–1) | Cortland (1–1) | Cortland (2–1) | Christopher Newport (3–0) | Wheaton (IL) (2–2) | Wisconsin–Oshkosh (3–2) | Wisconsin–Oshkosh (4–2) | Baldwin Wallace (6–1) | Baldwin Wallace (7–1) | Adrian (8–1) | Endicott (9–1) | Endicott (9–2) | 24. |
| 25. | John Carroll | Springfield (0–1) | Central (IA) (2–0) | Hampden–Sydney (3–0) | Wabash (4–0) | Randolph–Macon (4–1) | Maryville (5–0) | Wabash (6–1) | Muhlenberg (6–1) | Hampden–Sydney (7–1) | Franklin & Marshall (8–1) | Alma (8–2) | Alma (8–3) | 25. |
| | Preseason August 18 | Week 1 September 8 | Week 2 September 15 | Week 3 September 22 | Week 4 September 29 | Week 5 October 6 | Week 6 October 13 | Week 7 October 20 | Week 8 October 27 | Week 9 November 3 | Week 10 November 10 | Week 11 November 17 | Final January 5, 2026 | |
| | | Dropped: No. 24 Aurora (0–1) | Dropped: No. 20 Randolph–Macon (1–1); No. 24 Linfield (0–1); No. 25 Springfield (1–1) | Dropped: No. 22 Berry (2–1) | Dropped: No. 14 Susquehanna (2–2); No. 19 Grove City (1–2) | Dropped: No. 21 Hampden–Sydney (4–1); No. 25 Wabash (4–1) | Dropped: No. 22 Mary–Hardin Baylor; No. 23 Muhlenberg | Dropped: No. 25 Maryville | Dropped: No. 19 Carnegie Mellon; No. 24 Wisconsin–Oshkosh | Dropped: No. 25 Muhlenburg | Dropped: No. 24 Baldwin Wallace; No. 25 Hampden–Sydney | Dropped: No. 19 Central (IA); No. 23 Wabash; No. 24 Adrian | Dropped: No. 22 Cortland; No. 25 Monmouth | |
