= Jim Deere =

American football player and coach (born 1967)

Current position
- Title: Defensive coordinator
- Team: Madison HS (MI)

Biographical details
- Born: June 2, 1967 (age 59)

Playing career
- 1985–1988: Adrian
- Position: Defensive back

Coaching career (HC unless noted)
- 1993–1994: Sterling Heights Stevenson HS (MI) (assistant)
- 1996: Morenci HS (MI) (assistant)
- 1997–2006: Adrian (def. assistant)
- 2007–2009: Adrian (DC)
- 2010–2023: Adrian
- 2024–present: Madison HS (MI) (DC)

Head coaching record
- Overall: 76–60
- Tournaments: 0–2 (NCAA D-III playoffs)

Accomplishments and honors

Championships
- 2 MIAA (2012, 2014)

Jim Deere (born June 2, 1967) is an American college football coach and former player. He is the defensive coordinator for Madison High School, a position he has held since 2024. He was the head football coach at Adrian College from 2010 to 2023. He played college football at Adrian as a defensive back.

== Coaching career ==
=== Adrian ===
In 2014, Deere led the Adrian to their second outright Michigan Intercollegiate Athletic Association (MIAA) title in three seasons, previously winning the outright MIAA title in 2012. The 2012 MIAA title was the first outright MIAA title since 1983 and featured a perfect 6–0 record in MIAA play. Adrian returned to the NCAA Division III playoffs in 2014, marking the second appearance under Deere and the fourth in program history, losing to eventual national champion runner-up, Mount Union. Under Deere, in 2012, Adrian hosted an NCAA Division III playoff game for the first time in school history, losing to the Franklin Grizzlies.

On October 17, 2023, Deere resigned following a 1–6 start, leaving his overall record as 76–60. He is currently the defensive coordinator for Adrian Madison High School.

== Head coaching record ==
Year	Team	Overall	Conference	Standing	Bowl/playoffs
Adrian Bulldogs (Michigan Intercollegiate Athletic Association) (2010–present)
2010	Adrian	5–5	4–2	T–2nd	
2011	Adrian	8–2	4–2	T–2nd	
2012	Adrian	9–2	6–0	1st	L NCAA Division III First Round
2013	Adrian	6–4	3–3	4th	
2014	Adrian	8–3	5–1	1st	L NCAA Division III First Round
2015	Adrian	7–3	4–2	3rd	
2016	Adrian	4–6	2–4	5th	
2017	Adrian	5–5	4–2	3rd	
2018	Adrian	4–6	2–5	6th	
2019	Adrian	5–5	4–3	4th	
2020–21	Adrian	3–4	2–2	2nd	
2021	Adrian	5–5	3–3	T–4th	
2022	Adrian	6–4	3–3	T–3rd	
2023	Adrian	1–6	0–3		
Adrian:		76–60	46–35		
Total:		76–60			
National championship Conference title Conference division title or championship game berth
