= Adrian Bulldogs football =

College football team

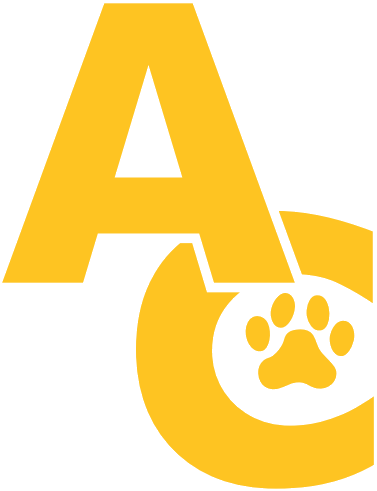
- First season: 1892; 134 years ago
- Athletic director: Craig Rainey
- Head coach: Joe Palka; 2nd season, 14–6 (.700)
- Location: Adrian, Michigan
- Stadium: Docking Stadium (capacity: 3,000)
- NCAA division: Division III
- Conference: MIAA
- Colors: Black and gold
- Mascot: Bulldogs
- Website: adrianbulldogs.com

The Adrian Bulldogs football team represents Adrian College in college football at the NCAA Division III level. The Bulldogs are members of the Michigan Intercollegiate Athletic Association (MIAA), fielding its team in the MIAA since 1937. The Bulldogs play their home games at Docking Stadium in Adrian, Michigan.

Their head coach is Joe Palka, who took over the position for the 2024 season.

== Championships ==
=== Conference championships ===
Adrian claims 18 conference titles, the most recent of which came in 2014.

Year	Conference	Overall record	Conference record	Coach
1911	Michigan Intercollegiate Athletic Association	7–1	3–1	Tom Leith
1930	Michigan-Ontario Collegiate Conference	5–4	N/A	Dale R. Sprankle
1931	Michigan-Ontario Collegiate Conference	5–4	4–0	Dale R. Sprankle
1932†	Michigan-Ontario Collegiate Conference	2–6–1	2–0–1	Dale R. Sprankle
1933†	Michigan-Ontario Collegiate Conference	5–3–1	N/A	Dale R. Sprankle
1934	Michigan-Ontario Collegiate Conference	3–5–1	N/A	Dale R. Sprankle
1935	Michigan-Ontario Collegiate Conference	7–3	3–0	Dale R. Sprankle
1936	Michigan-Ontario Collegiate Conference	3–7	N/A	Frank Ballenger
1970†	Michigan Intercollegiate Athletic Association	6–3	4–1	William C. Davis
1971†	Michigan Intercollegiate Athletic Association	5–4	4–1	William C. Davis
1972†	Michigan Intercollegiate Athletic Association	5–4	4–1	William C. Davis
1980	Michigan Intercollegiate Athletic Association	9–0	5–0	Tom Heckert Sr.
1983	Michigan Intercollegiate Athletic Association	8–2	5–0	Ron Labadie
1988†	Michigan Intercollegiate Athletic Association	7–3	4–1	Ron Labadie
1989†	Michigan Intercollegiate Athletic Association	5–4	4–1	Ron Labadie
1997†	Michigan Intercollegiate Athletic Association	8–1	5–1	Jim Lyall
2012	Michigan Intercollegiate Athletic Association	9–2	6–0	Jim Deere
2014	Michigan Intercollegiate Athletic Association	8–3	5–1	Jim Deere

† Co-champions

== Postseason games ==
=== NCAA Division III playoff games ===
Adrian has appeared in the Division III playoffs four times, with an overall record of 0–4.

Year	Round	Opponent	Result
1983	Quarterfinal	Augustana (IL)	L, 21–22
1988	First Round	Augustana (IL)	L, 7–25
2012	First Round	Franklin (IN)	L, 10–42
2014	First Round	Mount Union	L, 3–63
