= 2016 Olivet Comets football team =

American college football season

2016 Olivet Comets football

MIAA champion

2016 NCAA Division III First Round, L 12–37 at John Carroll
- Conference: Michigan Intercollegiate Athletic Association
- Record: 9–2 (6–0 MIAA)
- Head coach: Dan Pifer (5th season)
- Offensive coordinator: Dan Musielewicz (5th season)
- Defensive coordinator: Warren Maloney (4th season)
- Captains: Justin Madar; Braden Black; Thomas Gary-Homes; Robert Cuba
- Home stadium: Cutler Athletic Complex

2016 Michigan Intercollegiate Athletic Association football standings
	Conf.			Overall
Team	W		L	W		L
Olivet $^	6	–	0	9	–	2
Hope	5	–	1	7	–	3
Alma	4	–	2	7	–	3
Trine	3	–	3	6	–	4
Adrian	2	–	4	4	–	6
Kalamazoo	1	–	5	3	–	7
Albion	0	–	6	1	–	9
$ – Conference champion; ^ – NCAA Division III playoff participant

The 2016 Olivet Comets football team, sometimes known as Team 116 in reference to the 116th season of the Olivet Comets football program, was an American football team that represented Olivet College as a member of the Michigan Intercollegiate Athletic Association (MIAA) during the 2016 NCAA Division III football season. Led by Dan Pifer in his fifth and final season as head coach, the Comets compiled an overall record of 9–2 with a mark of 6–0 in conference play, winning the MIAA title. Olivet advanced to the NCAA Division III football championship playoffs, where the Comets lost in the first round to John Carroll. The team won the MIAA championship outright for the first time since 1974 and at least a share of the conference title for the second consecutive year, the first time Olivet won back-to-back titles since 1913 and 1914. The title was the 12th in program history, and the nine wins tied the single-season record set in 2015.

In December 2016, Pifer left Olivet to become thee head football coach at Walsh University. In January 2017, offensive coordinator and recruiting coordinator Dan Musielewicz was hired as the new head coach for the Comets.

== Schedule ==
Date	Time	Opponent	Site	TV	Result	Attendance
September 3	1:00 p.m.	at St. John Fisher*	Growney Stadium; Rochester, NY		L 10–52	2,566
September 12	1:00 p.m.	Emhurst*	Cutler Athletic Complex; Olivet, MI	Comet Sports Network	W 27–13	1,005
September 17	2:00 p.m.	at Wisconsin Lutheran*	Raabe Stadium; Milwaukee, WI		W 30–7	538
October 1	6:00 p.m.	at Hope	Ray & Sue Smith Stadium; Holland, MI		W 15–13	1,874
October 8	2:00 p.m.	Kalamazoo^{†}	Cutler Athletic Complex; Olivet, MI	Comet Sports Network	W 35–6	6,175
October 17	1:00 p.m.	at Albion	Sprankle–Sprandel Stadium; Albion, MI		W 31–14	3,522
October 22	1:00 p.m.	Benedictine (IL)*	Cutler Athletic Complex; Olivet, MI	Comet Sports Network	W 54–48 ^{OT}	1,085
October 29	1:00 p.m.	Alma	Cutler Athletic Complex; Olivet, MI	Comet Sports Network	W 36–30	2,005
November 5	1:00 p.m.	at Adrian	Docking Stadium; Adrian, MI		W 44–37	2,775
November 12	1:00 p.m.	Trine	Cutler Athletic Complex; Olivet, MI	Comet Sports Network	W 44–27	4,025
November 19	12:05 p.m.	at No. 6 John Carroll*	Don Shula Stadium; University Heights, OH (2016 NCAA Division III First Round)		L 12–37	1,926
*Non-conference game; ^{†}Homecoming; Rankings from D3football.com Poll released prior to the game; All times are in Eastern time

== Broadcasting ==
Radio broadcasting for the Comets was aired by 89.1 The One WOCR FM with play-by-play provided by sports director Matt Scher and color analysis by Zach Sturgill. The games could be heard on the radio and on wocrfm.com. A first for Olivet football, home games were broadcast on the Comet Sports Network produced by Visual Premier Productions, LLC. with audio simulcasted from WOCR's broadcast. The Comet Sports Network broadcasts were streamed through YouTube.
