= 1907 Olivet football team =

American college football season

1907 Olivet football
- Conference: Michigan Intercollegiate Athletic Association
- Record: 7–2 (5–1 MIAA)
- Head coach: Burt E. Kennedy (4th season)

The 1907 Olivet football team represented Olivet College as a member of the Michigan Intercollegiate Athletic Association (MIAA) during the 1907 college football season. Led by Burt E. Kennedy in his fourth and final season as head coach, Olivet compiled an overall record of 7–2 record with a mark of 5–1 in conference play.

== Schedule ==
Date	Time	Opponent	Site	Result	Attendance	Source
September 28		Battle Creek High School*	Olivet, MI	W 46–5		
October 12		Western State Normal*	Olivet, MI	W 43–0		
October 19		Albion	Olivet, MI	W 73–0		
October 23		at Kalamazoo	Kalamazoo, MI	W 47–0		
October 26		at Notre Dame*	Cartier Field; Notre Dame, IN	L 4–22		
November 2		Alma	Olivet, MI	W 14–0		
November 9		Hillsdale	Olivet, MI	W 40–6		
November 16	2:20 p.m.	at Michigan Agricultural	College Field; East Lansing, MI	L 4–55	3,000	
November 23		at Albion	Winter-Lau Field; Albion, MI	W 12–8		
*Non-conference game
