= Hope Flying Dutchmen football, 2010–2019 =

American college football seasons

2010–2019 Hope Flying Dutchmen football
- Conference: Michigan Intercollegiate Athletic Association
- Head coach: Dean Kreps (1995–2015); Peter Stuursma (2016–present)
- Home stadium: Holland Municipal Stadium (2010–2012), Ray & Sue Smith Stadium (2013–2019)

The Hope Flying Tigers football program, 2010–2019 represented Hope College from 2010 to 2019 in NCAA Division II college football as a member of the Michigan Intercollegiate Athletic Association (MIAA). The team was led by head coaches Dean Kreps (1995–2015) and Peter Stuursma (2016–present).

The team played its home games at Holland Municipal Stadium (2010-2012) and Ray & Sue Smith Stadium (2013-present).

== 2010 ==
2010 Hope Flying Dutchmen football
- Conference: Michigan Intercollegiate Athletic Association
- Record: 3–7 (3–3 MIAA)
- Head coach: Dean Kreps (16th season)
- Home stadium: Holland Municipal Stadium

2010 Michigan Intercollegiate Athletic Association football standings
| | Conf. | | | Overall |
| Team | W | | L | W | | L |
|---|---|---|---|---|---|---|
| No. 10 Trine $^ | 6 | – | 0 | 11 | – | 1 |
| Adrian | 4 | – | 2 | 5 | – | 5 |
| Albion | 4 | – | 2 | 5 | – | 5 |
| Hope | 3 | – | 3 | 3 | – | 7 |
| Alma | 2 | – | 4 | 3 | – | 7 |
| Kalamazoo | 2 | – | 4 | 3 | – | 7 |
| Olivet | 0 | – | 6 | 0 | – | 10 |
$ – Conference champion; ^ – NCAA Division III playoff participant; Rankings from D3football.com

The 2010 Hope Flying Dutchmen football team represented Hope College as a member of the Michigan Intercollegiate Athletic Association (MIAA) during the 2010 NCAA Division III football season. In their 16th year under head coach Dean Kreps, the Dutchmen compiled a 3–7 record (3–3 in conference games) and finished in fourth place in the MIAA.

== 2011 ==
2011 Hope Flying Dutchmen football
- Conference: Michigan Intercollegiate Athletic Association
- Record: 7–3 (5–1 MIAA)
- Head coach: Dean Kreps (17th season)
- Home stadium: Holland Municipal Stadium

2011 Michigan Intercollegiate Athletic Association football standings
| | Conf. | | | Overall |
| Team | W | | L | W | | L |
|---|---|---|---|---|---|---|
| Albion $^ | 6 | – | 0 | 6 | – | 5 |
| Hope | 5 | – | 1 | 7 | – | 3 |
| Adrian | 4 | – | 2 | 8 | – | 2 |
| Trine | 3 | – | 3 | 7 | – | 3 |
| Kalamazoo | 1 | – | 5 | 4 | – | 6 |
| Alma | 1 | – | 5 | 2 | – | 8 |
| Olivet | 1 | – | 5 | 1 | – | 9 |
$ – Conference champion; ^ – NCAA Division III playoff participant

The 2011 Hope Flying Dutchmen football team represented Hope College as a member of the Michigan Intercollegiate Athletic Association (MIAA) during the 2011 NCAA Division III football season. In their 17th year under head coach Dean Kreps, the Dutchmen compiled a 7–3 record (5–1 in conference games) and finished in second place in the MIAA.

== 2012 ==
2012 Hope Flying Dutchmen football
- Conference: Michigan Intercollegiate Athletic Association
- Record: 5–5 (4–2 MIAA)
- Head coach: Dean Kreps (18th season)
- Home stadium: Holland Municipal Stadium

2012 Michigan Intercollegiate Athletic Association football standings
| | Conf. | | | Overall |
| Team | W | | L | W | | L |
|---|---|---|---|---|---|---|
| Adrian $^ | 6 | – | 0 | 9 | – | 2 |
| Trine | 5 | – | 1 | 7 | – | 3 |
| Hope | 4 | – | 2 | 5 | – | 5 |
| Albion | 3 | – | 3 | 6 | – | 4 |
| Kalamazoo | 2 | – | 4 | 5 | – | 5 |
| Alma | 1 | – | 5 | 1 | – | 9 |
| Olivet | 0 | – | 6 | 0 | – | 10 |
$ – Conference champion; ^ – NCAA Division III playoff participant

The 2012 Hope Flying Dutchmen football team represented Hope College as a member of the Michigan Intercollegiate Athletic Association (MIAA) during the 2012 NCAA Division III football season. In their 18th year under head coach Dean Kreps, the Dutchmen compiled a 5–5 record (4–2 in conference games) and finished in third place in the MIAA.

== 2013 ==
2013 Hope Flying Dutchmen football
- Conference: Michigan Intercollegiate Athletic Association
- Record: 7–3 (4–3 MIAA)
- Head coach: Dean Kreps (19th season)
- Home stadium: Ray & Sue Smith Stadium

2013 Michigan Intercollegiate Athletic Association football standings
| | Conf. | | | Overall |
| Team | W | | L | W | | L |
|---|---|---|---|---|---|---|
| Albion $^ | 6 | – | 0 | 8 | – | 3 |
| Hope | 4 | – | 2 | 7 | – | 3 |
| Kalamazoo | 4 | – | 2 | 6 | – | 4 |
| Adrian | 3 | – | 3 | 6 | – | 4 |
| Olivet | 2 | – | 4 | 6 | – | 4 |
| Trine | 1 | – | 5 | 4 | – | 6 |
| Alma | 1 | – | 5 | 1 | – | 9 |
$ – Conference champion; ^ – NCAA Division III playoff participant

The 2013 Hope Flying Dutchmen football team represented Hope College as a member of the Michigan Intercollegiate Athletic Association (MIAA) during the 2013 NCAA Division III football season. In their 19th year under head coach Dean Kreps, the Dutchmen compiled a 7–3 record (4–2 in conference games) and tied for second place in the MIAA.

== 2014 ==
2014 Hope Flying Dutchmen football
- Conference: Michigan Intercollegiate Athletic Association
- Record: 6–4 (3–3 MIAA)
- Head coach: Dean Kreps (20th season)
- Home stadium: Ray & Sue Smith Stadium

2014 Michigan Intercollegiate Athletic Association football standings
| | Conf. | | | Overall |
| Team | W | | L | W | | L |
|---|---|---|---|---|---|---|
| Adrian $^ | 5 | – | 1 | 8 | – | 3 |
| Albion | 4 | – | 2 | 6 | – | 4 |
| Trine | 4 | – | 2 | 6 | – | 4 |
| Hope | 3 | – | 3 | 6 | – | 4 |
| Olivet | 3 | – | 3 | 6 | – | 4 |
| Kalamazoo | 2 | – | 4 | 2 | – | 8 |
| Alma | 0 | – | 6 | 2 | – | 8 |
$ – Conference champion; ^ – NCAA Division III playoff participant

The 2014 Hope Flying Dutchmen football team represented Hope College as a member of the Michigan Intercollegiate Athletic Association (MIAA) during the 2014 NCAA Division III football season. In their 20th year under head coach Dean Kreps, the Dutchmen compiled a 6–4 record (3–3 in conference games) and tied for fourth place in the MIAA.

== 2015 ==
2015 Hope Flying Dutchmen football
- Conference: Michigan Intercollegiate Athletic Association
- Record: 2–8 (0–6 MIAA)
- Head coach: Dean Kreps (21st season)
- Home stadium: Ray & Sue Smith Stadium

2015 Michigan Intercollegiate Athletic Association football standings
| | Conf. | | | Overall |
| Team | W | | L | W | | L |
|---|---|---|---|---|---|---|
| Olivet + | 5 | – | 1 | 9 | – | 1 |
| Albion +^ | 5 | – | 1 | 9 | – | 2 |
| Adrian | 4 | – | 2 | 7 | – | 3 |
| Trine | 4 | – | 2 | 6 | – | 4 |
| Alma | 2 | – | 4 | 5 | – | 5 |
| Kalamazoo | 1 | – | 5 | 3 | – | 7 |
| Hope | 0 | – | 6 | 2 | – | 8 |
+ – Conference co-champions; ^ – NCAA Division III playoff participant

The 2015 Hope Flying Dutchmen football team represented Hope College as a member of the Michigan Intercollegiate Athletic Association (MIAA) during the 2015 NCAA Division III football season. In their 21st and last year under head coach Dean Kreps, the Dutchmen compiled a 2–8 record (0–6 in conference games) and finished in seventh and last place in the MIAA.

== 2016 ==
2016 Hope Flying Dutchmen football
- Conference: Michigan Intercollegiate Athletic Association
- Record: 7–3 (5–1 MIAA)
- Head coach: Peter Stuursma (1st season)
- Home stadium: Ray & Sue Smith Stadium

2016 Michigan Intercollegiate Athletic Association football standings
| | Conf. | | | Overall |
| Team | W | | L | W | | L |
|---|---|---|---|---|---|---|
| Olivet $^ | 6 | – | 0 | 9 | – | 2 |
| Hope | 5 | – | 1 | 7 | – | 3 |
| Alma | 4 | – | 2 | 7 | – | 3 |
| Trine | 3 | – | 3 | 6 | – | 4 |
| Adrian | 2 | – | 4 | 4 | – | 6 |
| Kalamazoo | 1 | – | 5 | 3 | – | 7 |
| Albion | 0 | – | 6 | 1 | – | 9 |
$ – Conference champion; ^ – NCAA Division III playoff participant

The 2016 Hope Flying Dutchmen football team represented Hope College as a member of the Michigan Intercollegiate Athletic Association (MIAA) during the 2016 NCAA Division III football season. In their first year under head coach Peter Stuursma, the Dutchmen compiled an 8–2 record (5–1 in conference games) and finished in second place in the MIAA.

=== Schedule ===
| Date | Time | Opponent | Site | Result | Attendance | Source |
|---|---|---|---|---|---|---|
| September 3 | | Monmouth (IL)* | Ray & Sue Smith Stadium; Holland, MI | L 3–44 | 3,095 | |
| September 10 | | at Defiance* | Coressel Stadium; Defiance, OH | L 6–18 | 750 | |
| September 17 | | at Concordia (IL)* | Concordia Stadium; River Forest, IL | W 57–28 | 523 | |
| October 1 | 6:00 p.m. | Olivet | Ray & Sue Smith Stadium; Holland, MI | L 13–15 | 1,874 | |
| October 8 | | at Alma | Bahlke Field; Alma, MI | W 35–19 | 2,744 | |
| October 15 | | at Adrian | Docking Stadium; Adrian, MI | W 25–7 | 1,646 | |
| October 22 | | Trine | Ray & Sue Smith Stadium; Holland, MI | W 31–7 | 2,031 | |
| October 29 | | Kalamazoo | Ray & Sue Smith Stadium; Holland, MI | W 31–6 | 1,401 | |
| November 5 | | at Albion | Sprankle-Sprandel; Albion, MI | W 16–13 | 3,144 | |
| November 12 | | Concordia (WI)* | Ray & Sue Smith Stadium; Holland, MI | W 31–6 | 1,245 | |
*Non-conference game; All times are in Eastern time

== 2017 ==
2017 Hope Flying Dutchmen football
- Conference: Michigan Intercollegiate Athletic Association
- Record: 8–2 (5–1 MIAA)
- Head coach: Peter Stuursma (2nd season)
- Home stadium: Ray & Sue Smith Stadium

2017 Michigan Intercollegiate Athletic Association football standings
| | Conf. | | | Overall |
| Team | W | | L | W | | L |
|---|---|---|---|---|---|---|
| No. 19 Trine $^ | 6 | – | 0 | 11 | – | 1 |
| Hope | 5 | – | 1 | 8 | – | 2 |
| Adrian | 4 | – | 2 | 5 | – | 5 |
| Olivet | 3 | – | 3 | 5 | – | 5 |
| Albion | 2 | – | 4 | 4 | – | 6 |
| Alma | 1 | – | 5 | 4 | – | 6 |
| Kalamazoo | 0 | – | 6 | 1 | – | 9 |
$ – Conference champion; ^ – NCAA Division III playoff participant; Rankings from D3football.com

The 2017 Hope Flying Dutchmen football team represented Hope College as a member of the Michigan Intercollegiate Athletic Association (MIAA) during the 2017 NCAA Division III football season. In their second year under head coach Peter Stuursma, the Dutchmen compiled an 8–2 record (5–1 in conference games) and finished in second place in the MIAA.

=== Schedule ===
| Date | Opponent | Site | Result | Attendance | Source |
|---|---|---|---|---|---|
| September 2 | at Monmouth (IL)* | Zorn Stadium; Monmouth, IL | L 20–27 | 2,200 | |
| September 9 | Defiance* | Roy & Sue Smith Stadium; Holland, MI | W 38–0 | 2,532 | |
| September 16 | Lakeland* | Roy & Sue Smith Stadium; Holland, MI | W 37–35 | 2,270 | |
| September 30 | at Olivet | Cutler Athletic Complex; Olivet, MI | W 42–20 | 7,005 | |
| October 7 | Alma | Roy & Sue Smith Stadium; Holland, MI | W 36–14 | 1,602 | |
| October 14 | Adrian | Roy & Sue Smith Stadium; Holland, MI | W 22–3 | 2,002 | |
| October 21 | at Trine | Zollner Stadium; Angola, IN | L 14–50 | 4,900 | |
| October 28 | at Kalamazoo | Angell Field; Kalamazoo, MI | W 50–0 | 685 | |
| November 4 | Albion | Roy & Sue Smith Stadium; Holland, MI | W 48–10 | 1,402 | |
| November 11 | at Concordia (WI)* | Tomasini Stadium; Mequon, WI | W 70–6 | 391 | |
*Non-conference game

== 2018 ==
2018 Hope Flying Dutchmen football
- Conference: Michigan Intercollegiate Athletic Association
- Record: 8–2 (6–1 MIAA)
- Head coach: Peter Stuursma (3rd season)
- Home stadium: Ray & Sue Smith Stadium

2018 Michigan Intercollegiate Athletic Association football standings
| | Conf. | | | Overall |
| Team | W | | L | W | | L |
|---|---|---|---|---|---|---|
| No. 24 Trine $^ | 7 | – | 0 | 10 | – | 1 |
| Hope | 6 | – | 1 | 8 | – | 2 |
| Albion | 4 | – | 3 | 7 | – | 3 |
| Kalamazoo | 4 | – | 3 | 7 | – | 3 |
| Olivet | 4 | – | 3 | 6 | – | 4 |
| Adrian | 2 | – | 5 | 4 | – | 6 |
| Alma | 1 | – | 6 | 2 | – | 8 |
| Finlandia | 0 | – | 7 | 0 | – | 10 |
$ – Conference champion; ^ – NCAA Division III playoff participant; Rankings from D3football.com

The 2018 Hope Flying Dutchmen football team represented Hope College as a member of the Michigan Intercollegiate Athletic Association (MIAA) during the 2018 NCAA Division III football season. In their third year under head coach Peter Stuursma, the Dutchmen compiled an 8–2 record (6–1 in conference games) and finished in second place in the MIAA.

=== Schedule ===
| Date | Opponent | Site | Result | Attendance | Source |
|---|---|---|---|---|---|
| August 31 | Millikin | Roy & Sue Smith Stadium; Holland, MI | L 21–25 | 3,010 | |
| September 8 | at Defiance | Justin F. Coressel; Defiance, OH | W 41–0 | 336 | |
| September 15 | at Wisconsin Lutheran | Raabe Stadium; Milwaukee, MI | W 53–12 | 623 | |
| September 29 | Trine | Roy & Sue Smith Stadium; Holland, MI | L 25–35 | 2,602 | |
| October 6 | at Albion | Sprankle-Sprandel; Albion, MI | W 29–24 | 3,000 | |
| October 13 | Finlandia | Roy & Sue Smith Stadium; Holland, MI | W 70–6 | 1,877 | |
| October 20 | Olivet | Roy & Sue Smith Stadium; Holland, MI | W 35–30 | 1,900 | |
| October 27 | at Alma | Bahlke Field; Alma, MI | W 52–23 | 1,152 | |
| November 3 | Kalamazoo | Roy & Sue Smith Stadium; Holland, MI | W 33–7 | 2,002 | |
| November 10 | at Adrian | Docking Stadium; Adrian, MI | W 33–14 | 1,850 | |

== 2019 ==
2019 Hope Flying Dutchmen football

MIAA champion
- Conference: Michigan Intercollegiate Athletic Association
- Record: 9–2 (7–0 MIAA)
- Head coach: Peter Stuursma (4th season)
- Home stadium: Ray & Sue Smith Stadium

2019 Michigan Intercollegiate Athletic Association football standings
| | Conf. | | | Overall |
| Team | W | | L | W | | L |
|---|---|---|---|---|---|---|
| Hope $^ | 7 | – | 0 | 9 | – | 2 |
| Albion | 5 | – | 2 | 8 | – | 2 |
| Olivet | 5 | – | 2 | 8 | – | 2 |
| Alma | 4 | – | 3 | 6 | – | 4 |
| Adrian | 4 | – | 3 | 5 | – | 5 |
| Trine | 2 | – | 5 | 5 | – | 5 |
| Kalamazoo | 1 | – | 6 | 2 | – | 8 |
| Finlandia | 0 | – | 7 | 0 | – | 10 |
$ – Conference champion; ^ – NCAA Division III playoff participant

The 2019 Hope Flying Dutchmen football team represented Hope College as a member of the Michigan Intercollegiate Athletic Association (MIAA) during the 2019 NCAA Division III football season. In their fourth year under head coach Peter Stuursma, the Dutchmen compiled a 9–2 record (7–0 in conference games) and won the MIAA championship. It was Hope's first outright MIAA championship and its first playoff berth since 2006.

Hope players won the awards as both offensive and defensive most valuable players of the MIAA: quarterback Mason Opple on offense and linebacker Mason Dekker on defense. Opple also set Holland's single season baseball record with 120 RBIs in 2020.

=== Schedule ===
| Date | Opponent | Site | Result | Attendance | Source |
|---|---|---|---|---|---|
| September 6 | at Millikin* | Lindsay Field; Decatur, IL | L 21–27 | 2,400 | |
| September 14 | Defiance* | Roy & Sue Smith Stadium; Holland, MI | W 80–6 | 2,553 | |
| September 21 | Aurora* | Roy & Sue Smith Stadium; Holland, MI | W 34–32 | | |
| October 5 | at Trine | | W 51–0 | | |
| October 12 | Albion | Roy & Sue Smith Stadium; Holland, MI | W 52–33 | 2,803 | |
| October 19 | at Finlandia | McAfee Field; Hancock, MI | W 79–12 | | |
| October 26 | at Olivet | Cutler Athletic Complex; Olivet, MI | W 21–7 | 1,105 | |
| November 2 | Alma | Roy & Sue Smith Stadium; Holland, MI | W 31–24 | 1,822 | |
| November 9 | at Kalamazoo | Angell Field; Kalamazoo, MI | W 49–21 | 734 | |
| November 16 | Adrian | Roy & Sue Smith Stadium; Holland, MI | W 42–7 | 2,001 | |
| November 23 | Wartburg* | Roy & Sue Smith Stadium; Holland, MI (NCAA Division III playoffs) | L 3–41 | 2,384 | |
*Non-conference game
