= 2019 Michigan Intercollegiate Athletic Association football season =

- League: Michigan Intercollegiate Athletic Association
- Sport: Football
- Number of teams: 8
- Champion: Hope

Football seasons
- ← 2018 2020 →

2019 Michigan Intercollegiate Athletic Association football standings
	Conf.			Overall
Team	W		L	W		L
Hope $^	7	–	0	9	–	2
Albion	5	–	2	8	–	2
Olivet	5	–	2	8	–	2
Alma	4	–	3	6	–	4
Adrian	4	–	3	5	–	5
Trine	2	–	5	5	–	5
Kalamazoo	1	–	6	2	–	8
Finlandia	0	–	7	0	–	10
$ – Conference champion; ^ – NCAA Division III playoff participant

The 2019 Michigan Intercollegiate Athletic Association season was the season of college football played by the eight member schools of the Michigan Intercollegiate Athletic Association (MIAA) as part of the 2019 NCAA Division III football season.

The Hope Flying Dutchmen won the MIAA championship. Hope quarterback Mason Opple and linebacker Mason Dekker won the awards as offensive and defensive most valuable players of the MIAA.

== Conference overview ==
Conf. rank	Team	Head coach	Overall record	Conf. record	Points scored	Points against
1	Hope	Dustin Beurer	9–2	7–0	463	210
2 (tie)	Albion	Peter Stuursma	8–2	5–2	435	239
2 (tie)	Olivet	Dan Musielewicz	8–2	5–2	331	188
4 (tie)	Alma	Jason Couch	6–4	4–3	297	199
4 (tie)	Adrian	Jim Deere	5–5	4–3	261	376
6	Trine	Troy Abbs	5–5	2–6	252	226
7	Kalamazoo	Jamie Zorbo	2–8	1–6	169	262
8	Finlandia	Travis Wiltzius	0v10	0–7	79	498

== All-MIAA honors ==
At the end of the regular season in November 2019, the MIAA head coaches voted on individual honors, including the following:

- Most Valuable Offensive Player - Mason Opple, Hope
- Most Valuable Defensive Player - Mason Dekker, Hope
- Pete Schmidt Memorial Scholar Athlete Award - Chase Bouschor, Albion

The following players received first-team honors on the 2019 All-MIAA football team:

Offense

- Quarterback - Mason Opple, senior, Hope
- Running backs - Kenyea Houston, sophomore, Hope; Noah McMinn, senior, Olivet
- Wide receivers - Christian Bos, senior, Hope; Justin Thomas, sophomore, Albion; Henry Wilson, junior, Adrian
- Tight end - Joe Cleary, senior, Adrian
- Offensive line - Chase Bouschor, senior, Albion; Jarold Bush, senior, Olivet; Tim Avery, senior, Hope; Zach Smith, senior, Hope; Dan Waber, senior, Olivet

Defense

- Defensive line - Mitch Arendsen, junior, Albion; Jack Babb, senior, Hope; Noah Coplan, junior, Kalamazoo; Miguel Manion, senior, Olivet
- Linebackers - Mason Dekker, senior, Hope; Zeke Ramirez, senior, Alma;; Simeon Washington, senior, Trine; Kolby Williams, senior, Hope
- Defensive backs - Luke Beckhusen, senior, Hope; Tyrone Collins, freshman, Albion; Anthony Merriman, sophomore, Olivet; Isaiah Mason, freshman, Olivet

Special teams

- Punter - Austin Heeres, senior, Hope
- Return specialist - Chase Hinkle, senior, Alma
- Kicker - Cooper West, sophomore, Adrian

== Teams ==
=== Hope ===
2019 Hope Flying Dutchmen football

MIAA champion
- Conference: Michigan Intercollegiate Athletic Association
- Record: 9–2 (7–0 MIAA)
- Head coach: Peter Stuursma (4th season)
- Home stadium: Ray & Sue Smith Stadium

The 2019 Hope Flying Dutchmen football team represented Hope College as a member of the Michigan Intercollegiate Athletic Association (MIAA) during the 2019 NCAA Division III football season. Under head coach Peter Stuursma, the Dutchmen compiled a 9–2 record (7–0 against conference opponents) and won the MIAA championship. It was Hope's first outright MIAA championship and its first playoff berth since 2006.

Hope players won the awards as both offensive and defensive most valuable players of the MIAA: quarterback Mason Opple on offense and linebacker Mason Dekker on defense. Opple also set Holland's single season baseball record with 120 RBIs in 2020.

Date	Opponent	Site	Result	Attendance	Source
September 6	at Millikin*	Lindsay Field; Decatur, IL	L 21–27	2,400	
September 14	Defiance*	Roy & Sue Smith Stadium; Holland, MI	W 80–6	2,553	
September 21	Aurora*	Roy & Sue Smith Stadium; Holland, MI	W 34–32		
October 5	at Trine		W 51–0		
October 12	Albion	Roy & Sue Smith Stadium; Holland, MI	W 52–33	2,803	
October 19	at Finlandia	McAfee Field; Hancock, MI	W 79–12		
October 26	at Olivet	Cutler Athletic Complex; Olivet, MI	W 21–7	1,105	
November 2	Alma	Roy & Sue Smith Stadium; Holland, MI	W 31–24	1,822	
November 9	at Kalamazoo	Angell Field; Kalamazoo, MI	W 49–21	734	
November 16	Adrian	Roy & Sue Smith Stadium; Holland, MI	W 42–7	2,001	
November 23	Wartburg*	Roy & Sue Smith Stadium; Holland, MI (NCAA Division III playoffs)	L 3–41	2,384	
*Non-conference game

=== Albion ===
2019 Albion Britons football
- Conference: Michigan Intercollegiate Athletic Association
- Record: 8–2 (5–2 MIAA)
- Head coach: Dustin Beurer (1st season)
- Home stadium: Sprankle-Sprandel Stadium

The 2019 Albion Britons football team represented the Albion College as a member of the Michigan Intercollegiate Athletic Association (MIAA) during the 2019 NCAA Division III football season. Under head coach Dustin Beurer, the Britons compiled an 8–2 record (5–2 against conference opponents) and finished in second place in the MIAA.

Date	Opponent	Site	Result	Attendance	Source
September 7	Defiance*	Sprankle-Sprandel Stadium; Albion, MI	W 56–6	4,632	
September 14	at Franklin*	Faught Stadium; Franklin, IN	W 48–26	3,000	
September 21	Eureka*	Sprankle-Sprandel Stadium; Albion, MI	W 56–41	3,796	
October 5	Alma	Sprankle-Sprandel Stadium; Albion, MI	L 28–32	4,244	
October 12	at Hope	Roy & Sue Smith Stadium; Holland, MI	L 33–52	2,803	
October 19	at Kalamazoo	Angell Field; Kalamazoo, MI	W 37–17	1,402	
October 26	Adrian	Sprankle-Sprandel Stadium; Albion, MI	W 69–24	1,501	
November 2	Trine	Sprankle-Sprandel Stadium; Albion, MI	W 24–14	964	
November 9	at Finlandia	McAfee Field; Hancock, MI	W 54–6	357	
November 16	at Olivet	Cutler Athletic Complex; Olivet, MI	W 30–21	1,250	
*Non-conference game

=== Olivet ===
2019 Olivet Comets football
- Conference: Michigan Intercollegiate Athletic Association
- Record: 8–2 (5–2 MIAA)
- Head coach: Dan Musielewicz (3rd season)
- Home stadium: Cutler Athletic Complex

The 2019 Olivet Comets football team represented Olivet College as a member of the Michigan Intercollegiate Athletic Association (MIAA) during the 2019 NCAA Division III football season. Under head coach Dan Musielewicz, the Comets compiled an 8–2 record (5–2 against conference opponents) and finished in a tie for second place in the MIAA.

Date	Opponent	Site	Result	Attendance	Source
September 7	at Wilmington (OH)*	Williams Stadium; Wilmington, OH	W 20–7		
September 14	Concordia (IL)*	Concordia Stadium; River Forest, IL	W 54–24		
September 21	Benedictine (IL)	Cutler Athletic Complex; Olivet, MI	W 21–6		
October 5	at Finlandia	McAfee Field; Hancock, MI	W 63–6		
October 12	Adrian^{†}	Cutler Athletic Complex; Olivet, MI	W 21–17		
October 19	at Trine	Fred Zollner Athletic Stadium; Angola, IN	W 34–17		
October 26	Hope	Cutler Athletic Complex; Olivet, MI	L 7–21		
November 2	at Kalamazoo	Angell Field; Kalamazoo, MI	W 30–20		
November 9	at Alma	Bahlke Field; Alma, MI	W 28–13		
November 16	Albion	Cutler Athletic Complex; Olivet, MI	L 21–30		
*Non-conference game; ^{†}Homecoming

=== Alma ===
2019 Alma Scots football
- Conference: Michigan Intercollegiate Athletic Association
- Record: 6–4 (4–3 MIAA)
- Head coach: Jason Couch (2nd season)
- Home stadium: Bahlke Field

The 2019 Alma Scots football team represented Alma College as a member of the Michigan Intercollegiate Athletic Association (MIAA) during the 2019 NCAA Division III football season. In their second season under head coach Jason Couch, the Scots compiled a 6–4 record (4–3 against conference opponents) and tied for fourth place in the MIAA.

Date	Opponent	Site	Result	Attendance	Source
September 7	Baldwin Wallace	Bahlke Field; Alma, MI	L 14–31	1,359	
September 14	at Manchester (IN)	Burt Field; North Manchester, IN	W 35–7	515	
September 21	Rockford (IL)	Bahlke Field; Alma, MI	W 51–16	2,042	
October 5	at Albion	Sprankle-Sprandel Stadium; Albion, MI	W 32–28	4,244	
October 12	Trine	Bahlke Field; Alma, MI	W 23–14	1,091	
October 19	at Adrian	Docking Stadium; Adrian, MI	L 31–34	3,001	
October 26	Kalamazoo	Bahlke Field; Alma, MI	W 28–10	1,168	
November 2	at Hope	Ray & Sue Smith Stadium; Holland, MI	L 24–31	1,822	
November 9	Olivet	Bahlke Field; Alma, MI	L 13–28	1,122	
November 16	Finlandia	Bahlke Field; Alma, MI	W 46–0	743	

=== Adrian ===
2019 Adrian Bulldogs football
- Conference: Michigan Intercollegiate Athletic Association
- Record: 5–5 (4–3 MIAA)
- Head coach: Jim Deere (10th season)
- Offensive coordinator: Harry Bailey (6th season)
- Home stadium: Docking Stadium

The 2019 Adrian Bulldogs football team represented Adrian College as a member of the Michigan Intercollegiate Athletic Association (MIAA) during the 2019 NCAA Division III football season. Under head coach Jim Deere, the Bulldogs compiled a 5–5 record (4–3 against conference opponents) and tied for fourth place in the MIAA.

Date	Opponent	Site	Result	Attendance	Source
September 7	Heidelberg*	Docking Stadium; Adrian, MI	L 7–57	2,247	
September 14	at Hanover*	Alumni stadium; Hanover, IN	L 28–49	2,593	
September 21	Wisconsin Lutheran*	Docking Stadium; Adrian, MI	W 32–29	3,719	
October 5	Kalamazoo	Docking Stadium; Adrian, MI	W 30–27	1,246	
October 12	at Olivet	Cutler Athletic Complex; Olivet, MI	L 17–21	5,555	
October 19	Alma	Docking Stadium; Adrian, MI	W 34–31	3,001	
October 26	at Albion	Sprankle-Sprandel Stadium; Albion, MI	L 24–69	1,501	
November 2	at Finlandia	McAfee Field; Hancock, MI	W 48–24	480	
November 9	Trine	Docking Stadium; Adrian, MI	W 34–26	529	
November 16	at Hope	Ray & Sue Smith Stadium; Holland, MI	L 7–42	2,001	
*Non-conference game

=== Trine ===
2021 Trine Thunder football
- Conference: Michigan Intercollegiate Athletic Association
- Record: 5–5 (2–5 MIAA)
- Head coach: Troy Abbs (5th season)
- Home stadium: Fred Zollner Athletic Stadium

The 2019 Trine Thunder football team represented the Trine University as a member of the Michigan Intercollegiate Athletic Association (MIAA) during the 2019 NCAA Division III football season. Under head coach Troy Abbs, the Thunder compiled a 5–5 record (2–5 against conference opponents) and finished in sixth place in the MIAA.

Date	Opponent	Site	Result	Attendance	Source
September 5	at Manchester*	Burt Field; North Manchester, IN	W 38–21		
September 14	at Bluffton*	Bluffton, OH	W 35–20		
September 21	Concordia Wisconsin*	Fred Zollner Athletic Stadium; Angola, IN	W 21–16		
October 5	Hope	Fred Zollner Athletic Stadium; Angola, IN	L 0–51		
October 12	at Alma	Bahlke Field; Alma, MI	L 14–23		
October 19	Olivet	Fred Zollner Athletic Stadium; Angola, IN	L 17–34		
October 26	Finlandia	Fred Zollner Athletic Stadium; Angola, IN	W 58–0		
November 2	at Albion	Sprankle-Sprandel Stadium; Albion, MI	L 14–24		
November 9	at Adrian	Docking Stadium; Adrian, MI	L 26–34		
November 16	Kalamazoo	Fred Zollner Athletic Stadium; Angola, IN	W 29–3		
*Non-conference game

=== Kalamazoo ===
2019 Kalamazoo Hornets football
- Conference: Michigan Intercollegiate Athletic Association
- Record: 2–8 (1–6 MIAA)
- Head coach: Jamie Zorbo (12th season)
- Home stadium: Angell Field

The 2019 Kalamazoo Hornets football team represented Kalamazoo College as a member of the Michigan Intercollegiate Athletic Association (MIAA) during the 2019 NCAA Division III football season. The Hornets compiled a 2–8 record (1–6 against conference opponents) and finished in seventh place in the MIAA.

It was Jamie Zorbo's 12th season as Kalamazoo's head football coach.

Date	Opponent	Site	Result	Attendance	Source
September 7	at Oberlin	Knowlton Complex; Oberlin, OH	W 3–0	1,231	
September 14	at Greenville	Francis Field; Greenville, IL	L 17–31	500	
September 21	Lakeland	Angell Field; Kalamazoo, MI	L 7–28	698	
October 5	at Adrian	Docking Stadium; Adrian, MI	L 27–30	1,246	
October 12	Finlandia	Angell Field; Kalamazoo, MI	W 44–0	562	
October 19	Albion^{†}	Angell Field; Kalamazoo, MI	L 17–37	1,402	
October 26	at Alma	Bahlke Field; Alma, MI	L 10–28	1,168	
November 2	Olivet	Angell Field; Kalamazoo, MI	L 20–30	639	
November 9	Hope	Angell Field; Kalamazoo, MI	L 21–49	734	
November 16	at Trine	Fred Zollner Athletic Stadium; Angola, IN	L 3–29	1,100	
^{†}Homecoming

=== Finlandia ===
2019 Finlandia Lions football
- Conference: Michigan Intercollegiate Athletic Association
- Record: 0–10 (0–7 MIAA)
- Head coach: Travis Wiltzius (2nd season)

The 2019 Finlandia Lions football team represented Finlandia University as a member of the Michigan Intercollegiate Athletic Association (MIAA) during the 2019 NCAA Division III football season. Under head coach Travis Wiltzius, the Lions compiled a 0–10 record (0–8 against conference opponents) and finished in last place in the MIAA.

Date	Opponent	Site	Result	Attendance	Source
September 7	Concordia (WI)*	McAfee Field; Hacock, MI	L 7–38	657	
September 14	Ripon*	McAfee Field; Hancock, MI	L 12–45	527	
September 21	Concordia-Chicago}*	McAfee Field; Hancock, MI	L 12–23	657	
October 5	Olivet	McAfee Field; Hancock, MI	L 6–63	637	
October 12	at Kalamazoo	Angell Field; Kalamazoo, MI	L 0–44	562	
October 19	Hope	McAfee Field; Hancock, MI	L 12–79	475	
October 26	at Trine	Fred Zollner Athletic Stadium; Angola, IN	L 0–58	1,007	
November 2	Adrian	McAfee Field; Hancock, MI	L 24–48	480	
November 9	Albion	McAfee Field; Hancock, MI	L 6–54	357	
November 16	at Alma	Alma, MI	L 0–46	743	
*Non-conference game
