= Hope Flying Dutchmen football, 1990–1999 =

American college football seasons

1990–1999 Hope Flying Dutchmen football
- Conference: Michigan Intercollegiate Athletic Association
- Head coach: Ray Smith (1970–1994); Dean Kreps (1995–2015)

The Hope Flying Tigers football program, 1990–1999 represented Hope College from 1990 to 1999 in NCAA Division II college football as a member of the Michigan Intercollegiate Athletic Association (MIAA). The team was led by two head coaches: Ray Smith (1970–1994) and Dean Kreps (1995–2015).

== 1990 ==
1990 Hope Flying Dutchmen football
- Conference: Michigan Intercollegiate Athletic Association
- Record: 6–1–2 (3–1–1 MIAA)
- Head coach: Ray Smith (21st season)

1990 Michigan Intercollegiate Athletic Association football standings
	Conf.					Overall
Team	W		L		T	W		L		T
Albion $	4	–	0	–	1	7	–	1	–	1
Hope	3	–	1	–	1	6	–	1	–	2
Olivet	3	–	2	–	0	4	–	5	–	0
Adrian	2	–	2	–	1	4	–	4	–	1
Kalamazoo	1	–	3	–	1	3	–	5	–	1
Alma	0	–	5	–	0	3	–	6	–	0
$ – Conference champion

The 1990 Hope Flying Dutchmen football team represented Hope College of Hope, Michigan. In their 21st year under head coach Ray Smith, the Flying Dutchmen compiled a 6–1–2 record (3–1–1 in MIAA games) and finished in second place in the MIAA.

=== Schedule ===
Date	Opponent	Site	Result	Attendance	Source
September 8	DePauw*	Holland, MI	W 22–14		
September 15	at Findlay*	Findlay, OH	T 23–23		
September 22	Drake*	Holland, MI	W 17–13		
September 29	at Aurora*		W 17–12		
October 6	at Adrian	Adrian, MI	W 23–14		
October 13	Olivet	Holland, MI	L 14–20		
October 20	Albion	Holland, MI	T 10–10		
October 27	at Alma	Alma, MI	W 21–13		
November 3	Kalamazoo	Holland, MI	W 21–15		
*Non-conference game

== 1991 ==
1991 Hope Flying Dutchmen football
- Conference: Michigan Intercollegiate Athletic Association
- Record: 5–4 (2–3 MIAA)
- Head coach: Ray Smith (22nd season)
- Home stadium: Holland Municipal Stadium

1991 Michigan Intercollegiate Athletic Association football standings
	Conf.					Overall
Team	W		L		T	W		L		T
Albion +^	4	–	0	–	1	8	–	1	–	1
Olivet +	4	–	0	–	1	7	–	1	–	1
Hope	2	–	3	–	0	5	–	4	–	0
Kalamazoo	2	–	3	–	0	5	–	4	–	0
Adrian	1	–	4	–	0	4	–	5	–	0
Alma	1	–	4	–	0	4	–	5	–	0
+ – Conference co-champions; ^ – NCAA Division III playoff participant

The 1991 Hope Flying Dutchmen football team represented Hope College during the 1991 NCAA Division II football season. In their 22nd year under head coach Ray Smith, the Flying Dutchmen compiled a 5–4 record (2–3 in MIAA games) and tied for third place in the MIAA.

The team played its home games at Holland Municipal Stadium in Holland, Michigan.

=== Schedule ===
Date	Opponent	Site	Result	Attendance	Source
September 7	Findlay	Holland Municipal Stadium; Holland, MI	L 14–17	4,065	
September 14	at DePauw	Greencastle, IN	W 23–14		
September 21	at Drake*	Des Moines, IA	W 31–28		
September 28	Aurora*	Holland Municipal Stadium; Holland, MI	W 12–0		
October 12	Alma^{†}	Holland Municipal Stadium; Holland, MI	W 10–7	4,500	
October 19	at Albion	Albion, MI	L 19–35	5,015	
October 26	at Adrian	Adrian, MI	W 20–6	3,000	
November 2	Kalamazoo	Holland Municipal Stadium; Holland, MI	L 0–14	1,428	
November 9	at Olivet	Olivet, MI	L 14–21	3,221	
*Non-conference game; ^{†}Homecoming

== 1992 ==
1992 Hope Flying Dutchmen football
- Conference: Michigan Intercollegiate Athletic Association
- Record: 6–3 (4–1 MIAA)
- Head coach: Ray Smith (23rd season)
- Home stadium: Holland Municipal Stadium

1992 Michigan Intercollegiate Athletic Association football standings
	Conf.					Overall
Team	W		L		T	W		L		T
Albion $	5	–	0	–	0	8	–	1	–	0
Hope	4	–	1	–	0	6	–	3	–	0
Olivet	2	–	3	–	0	2	–	6	–	1
Adrian	2	–	3	–	0	2	–	7	–	0
Alma	1	–	4	–	0	3	–	6	–	0
Kalamazoo	1	–	4	–	0	3	–	6	–	0
$ – Conference champion

The 1992 Hope Flying Dutchmen football team represented Hope College during the 1992 NCAA Division II football season. In their 23rd year under head coach Ray Smith, the Flying Dutchmen compiled a 6–3 record (4–1 in MIAA games) and finished in second place in the MIAA.

The team played its home games at Hope Municipal Stadium in Hope, Michigan.

=== Schedule ===
Date	Opponent	Site	Result	Attendance	Source
September 12	DePauw*	Holland Municipal Stadium; Holland, MI	L 0–6	2,713	
Sep 19	at Illinois Wesleyan*	Bloomington, IL	L 20–33		
September 26	Wabash*	Holland Municipal Stadium; Holland, MI	W 19–10		
October 3	at Trinity Christian*	Deerfield, IL	W 12–0		
October 10	at Alma	Bahlke Stadium; Alma, MI	W 35–6	5,099	
October 17	Albion	Holland Municipal Stadium; Holland, MI	L 0–37		
October 24	Adrian	Holland Municipal Stadium; Holland, MI	W 19–14		
October 31	at Kalamazoo	Angell Field; Kalamazoo, MI	W 26–6	3,000	
November 7	Olivet	Holland Municipal Stadium; Holland, MI	W 21–17	1,952	
*Non-conference game

== 1993 ==
1993 Hope Flying Dutchmen football
- Conference: Michigan Intercollegiate Athletic Association
- Record: 5–4 (3–2 MIAA)
- Head coach: Ray Smith (24th season)
- Home stadium: Holland Municipal Stadium

1993 Michigan Intercollegiate Athletic Association football standings
	Conf.					Overall
Team	W		L		T	W		L		T
Albion $^	5	–	0	–	0	10	–	1	–	0
Kalamazoo	4	–	1	–	0	7	–	2	–	0
Hope	3	–	2	–	0	5	–	4	–	0
Alma	2	–	3	–	0	2	–	7	–	0
Adrian	1	–	4	–	0	2	–	7	–	0
Olivet	0	–	5	–	0	1	–	8	–	0
$ – Conference champion; ^ – NCAA Division III playoff participant

The 1993 Hope Flying Dutchmen football team represented Hope College during the 1993 NCAA Division II football season. In their 24th year under head coach Ray Smith, the Flying Dutchmen compiled a 5–4 record (3–2 in MIAA games) and finished in third place in the MIAA.

The team played its home games at Hope Municipal Stadium in Hope, Michigan.

== 1994 ==
1994 Hope Flying Dutchmen football
- Conference: Michigan Intercollegiate Athletic Association
- Record: 4–4–1 (2–3 MIAA)
- Head coach: Ray Smith (25th season)

1994 Michigan Intercollegiate Athletic Association football standings
	Conf.					Overall
Team	W		L		T	W		L		T
Albion $^	5	–	0	–	0	13	–	0	–	0
Alma	4	–	1	–	0	8	–	1	–	0
Hope	2	–	3	–	0	4	–	4	–	1
Kalamazoo	2	–	3	–	0	4	–	5	–	0
Adrian	2	–	3	–	0	3	–	6	–	0
Olivet	0	–	5	–	0	1	–	8	–	0
$ – Conference champion; ^ – NCAA Division III playoff participant

The 1994 Hope Flying Dutchmen football team represented Hope College during the 1994 NCAA Division II football season. In their 25th and final year under head coach Ray Smith, the Flying Dutchmen compiled a 4–4–1 record (2–3 against MIAA opponents), tied for third place in the MIAA, and outscored opponents by a total of 159 to 123.

=== Schedule ===
Date	Opponent	Site	Result	Attendance	Source
September 10	at Wheaton*	Wheaton, IL	L 21–24		
September 17	at DePauw*	Greencastle, IN	W 19–0		
September 24	Wabash*	Holland, MI	W 24–7		
October 1	at Aurora*	Aurora, IL	T 3–3		
October 8	at Kalamazoo	Kalamazoo, MI	W 20–14		
October 15	Alma	Holland, MI	L 6–10		
October 22	at Albion	Albion, MI	L 12–35		
October 29	Adrian	Holland, MI	L 13–14		
November 5	Olivet	Holland, MI	W 41–16		
*Non-conference game

== 1995 ==
1995 Hope Flying Dutchmen football
- Conference: Michigan Intercollegiate Athletic Association
- Record: 2–7 (1–4 MIAA)
- Head coach: Dean Kreps (1st season)

1995 Michigan Intercollegiate Athletic Association football standings
	Conf.					Overall
Team	W		L		T	W		L		T
Albion $	5	–	0	–	0	8	–	1	–	0
Adrian	3	–	2	–	0	6	–	3	–	0
Alma	3	–	2	–	0	6	–	3	–	0
Kalamazoo	3	–	2	–	0	4	–	5	–	0
Hope	1	–	4	–	0	2	–	7	–	0
Olivet	0	–	5	–	0	3	–	6	–	0
$ – Conference champion

The 1995 Hope Flying Dutchmen football team represented Hope College during the 1995 NCAA Division II football season. In their first year under head coach Dean Kreps, the Flying Dutchmen compiled a 2–7 record (1–4 in MIAA games) and finished in fifth place out of six teams in the MIAA.

== 1996 ==
1996 Hope Flying Dutchmen football
- Conference: Michigan Intercollegiate Athletic Association
- Record: 4–5 (3–2 MIAA)
- Head coach: Dean Kreps (2nd season)

1996 Michigan Intercollegiate Athletic Association football standings
	Conf.			Overall
Team	W		L	W		L
Albion $^	5	–	0	9	–	1
Hope	3	–	2	4	–	5
Alma	2	–	3	4	–	5
Kalamazoo	2	–	3	3	–	6
Olivet	2	–	3	2	–	7
Adrian	1	–	4	3	–	6
$ – Conference champion; ^ – NCAA Division III playoff participant

The 1996 Hope Flying Dutchmen football team represented Hope College during the 1996 NCAA Division II football season. In their second year under head coach Dean Kreps, the Flying Dutchmen compiled a 4–5 record (3–2 in MIAA games) and finished in second place in the MIAA.

== 1997 ==
1997 Hope Flying Dutchmen football

MIAA co-champion
- Conference: Michigan Intercollegiate Athletic Association
- Record: 6–3 (4–1 MIAA)
- Head coach: Dean Kreps (3rd season)

1997 Michigan Intercollegiate Athletic Association football standings
	Conf.			Overall
Team	W		L	W		L
Adrian +	4	–	1	8	–	1
Hope +	4	–	1	6	–	3
Albion	3	–	2	6	–	3
Alma	3	–	2	6	–	3
Kalamazoo	1	–	4	3	–	6
Olivet	0	–	5	3	–	6
+ – Conference co-champions

The 1997 Hope Flying Dutchmen football team represented Hope College during the 1997 NCAA Division II football season. In their third year under head coach Dean Kreps, the Flying Dutchmen compiled a 6–3 record (4–1 in MIAA games) and tied with Adrian for the MIAA championship.

== 1998 ==
1998 Hope Flying Dutchmen football
- Conference: Michigan Intercollegiate Athletic Association
- Record: 5–4 (4–2 MIAA)
- Head coach: Dean Kreps (4th season)

1998 Michigan Intercollegiate Athletic Association football standings
	Conf.			Overall
Team	W		L	W		L
Albion $^	6	–	0	8	–	2
Hope	4	–	2	5	–	4
Adrian	3	–	3	5	–	4
Alma	3	–	3	5	–	4
Olivet	2	–	4	5	–	4
Kalamazoo	2	–	4	4	–	5
Defiance	1	–	5	3	–	6
$ – Conference champion; ^ – NCAA Division III playoff participant

The 1998 Hope Flying Dutchmen football team represented Hope College during the 1998 NCAA Division II football season. In their fourth year under head coach Dean Kreps, the Flying Dutchmen compiled a 5–4 record (4–2 in MIAA games) and finished in second place in the MIAA.

== 1999 ==
1999 Hope Flying Dutchmen football

MIAA co-champion
- Conference: Michigan Intercollegiate Athletic Association
- Record: 5–4 (5–1 MIAA)
- Head coach: Dean Kreps (5th season)

1999 Michigan Intercollegiate Athletic Association football standings
	Conf.			Overall
Team	W		L	W		L
Alma +^	5	–	1	8	–	2
Albion +	5	–	1	6	–	3
Hope +	5	–	1	5	–	4
Defiance	3	–	3	4	–	5
Kalamazoo	2	–	4	3	–	6
Adrian	1	–	5	2	–	7
Olivet	0	–	6	0	–	9
+ – Conference co-champions; ^ – NCAA Division III playoff participant

The 1999 Hope Flying Dutchmen football team represented Hope College during the 1999 NCAA Division II football season. In their fifth year under head coach Dean Kreps, the Flying Dutchmen compiled a 5–4 record (5–1 in MIAA games) and finished in a three-way tie with Alma and Albion for the MIAA championship.
