= Wiltzius =

Wiltzius is a surname. Notable people with the surname include:

- Pierre Wiltzius (born 1952), American physicist
- Travis Wiltzius, American football coach
