= Dan Pifer =

American football player and coach (born 1972)

Biographical details
- Born: January 11, 1972 (age 54); Celina, Ohio, U.S.
- Education: California University of Pennsylvania (1995)

Playing career
- 1990–1995: California (PA)
- Position: Quarterback

Coaching career (HC unless noted)
- 1996: Saint Joseph's (IN) (assistant)
- 1997–1999: Saint Francis (IN) (OC)
- 2002–2003: Hillsdale (QB/WR/DL)
- 2004–2005: Bellmont HS (IN) (OC)
- 2005: Fort Wayne Freedom (OC)
- 2006: Fort Wayne Freedom
- 2006–2011: Tri–State / Trine (OC/RC/ST)
- 2012–2016: Olivet
- 2017: Walsh
- 2018: Bowling Green (RC)
- 2019: Saline HS (MI) (assistant)
- 2020–2024: Cornell (IA)

Head coaching record
- Overall: 52–50 (college); 4–11 (UIF)
- Tournaments: 0–1 (NCAA D–III playoffs)

Accomplishments and honors

Championships
- 2 MIAA (2015–2016)

Dan Pifer (born January 11, 1972) is an American football coach. He most recently served as the head football coach for Cornell College, a position he had held from 2020 to 2024. He has served as the recruiting coordinator at Bowling Green State University in Bowling Green, Ohio in 2018. Previously, Pifer served as the head football coach at Walsh University in North Canton, Ohio in 2017 and at Olivet College in Olivet, Michigan from 2012 to 2016 and was the head coach for the United Indoor Football's now-defunct Fort Wayne Freedom. He is now the varsity head coach for Eaton Rapids High School in Eaton Rapids, MI.

Pifer was an assistant offensive coordinator, running backs coach, and strength and conditioning coach for former Fort Wayne Freedom and Trine University head coach now Athletic Director Matt Land. He has served as quarterbacks coach in the past. He was a 1990 graduate of Celina High School.

== Head coaching record ==
=== College ===
Year	Team	Overall	Conference	Standing	Bowl/playoffs
Olivet Comets (Michigan Intercollegiate Athletic Association) (2012–2016)
2012	Olivet	0–10	0–6	7th	
2013	Olivet	6–4	2–4	5th	
2014	Olivet	6–4	3–3	T–4th	
2015	Olivet	9–1	5–1	T–1st	
2016	Olivet	9–2	6–0	1st	L NCAA Division III First Round
Olivet:		30–21	16–14		
Walsh Cavaliers (Great Midwest Athletic Conference) (2017)
2017	Walsh	4–7	4–3	4th	
Walsh:		4–7	4–3		
Cornell Rams (Midwest Conference) (2020–2024)
2020–21	No team—COVID-19				
2021	Cornell	4–6	4–5	6th	
2022	Cornell	3–7	3–6	7th	
2023	Cornell	6–4	6–3	T–3rd	
2024	Cornell	5–5	5–4	5th	
Cornell:		18–22	18–18		
Total:		52–50			
National championship Conference title Conference division title or championship game berth
