= 2015 Olivet Comets football team =

American college football season

2015 Olivet Comets football

MIAA co-champion
- Conference: Michigan Intercollegiate Athletic Association
- Record: 9–1 (5–1 MIAA)
- Head coach: Dan Pifer (4th season)
- Offensive coordinator: Dan Musielewicz (4th season)
- Defensive coordinator: Warren Maloney (3rd season)
- Home stadium: Cutler Athletic Complex

2015 Michigan Intercollegiate Athletic Association football standings
	Conf.			Overall
Team	W		L	W		L
Olivet +	5	–	1	9	–	1
Albion +^	5	–	1	9	–	2
Adrian	4	–	2	7	–	3
Trine	4	–	2	6	–	4
Alma	2	–	4	5	–	5
Kalamazoo	1	–	5	3	–	7
Hope	0	–	6	2	–	8
+ – Conference co-champions; ^ – NCAA Division III playoff participant

The 2015 Olivet Comets football team, sometimes known as Team 115 in reference to the 115th season of the Olivet Comets football program, was an American football team that represented Olivet College as a member of the Michigan Intercollegiate Athletic Association (MIAA) during the 2015 NCAA Division III football season. Led by fourth-hear head coach Dan Pifer, the Comets compiled an overall record of 9–1 with a mark of 5–1 in conference play, sharing the MIAA title with Albion. The MIAA championship was the 11th in program history and the first since 2007. The nine wins set a single-season record for Olivet. The team played home games at the Cutler Athletic Complex in Olivet, Michigan.

== Schedule ==
Date	Time	Opponent	Site	Result	Attendance
September 5	1:00 p.m.	Earlham*	Cutler Athletic Complex; Olivet, MI	W 74–13	1,500
September 12	2:00 p.m.	at Carthage*	Art Keller Field; Kenosha, WI	W 42–32	1,500
September 19	1:00 p.m.	Aurora*	Cutler Athletic Complex; Olivet, MI	W 44–14	1,050
October 3	2:00 p.m.	Adrian^{†}	Cutler Athletic Complex; Olivet, MI	W 35–7	3,647
October 10	1:00 p.m.	at Trine	Fred Zollner Athletic Stadium; Angola, IN	W 49–24	5,344
October 17	1:00 p.m.	Hope	Cutler Athletic Complex; Olivet, MI	W 31–27	1,845
October 24	2:00 p.m.	at Kalamazoo	Angell Field; Kalamazoo, MI	W 55–21	1,350
October 31	1:00 p.m.	Albion	Cutler Athletic Complex; Olivet, MI	L 21–49	4,025
November 7	12:00 p.m.	at Concordia (WI)*	Tomasini Stadium; Mequon, WI	W 56–42	1,206
November 14	1:00 p.m.	at Alma	Bahlke Field; Alma, MI	W 47–29	1,541
*Non-conference game; ^{†}Homecoming; All times are in Eastern time

== Broadcasting ==
Radio broadcasting for the Comets was carried by 89.1 The One WOCR FM with play-by-play from by station manager Travis Oberlin and color analysis by Daniel Neugent. The games could be heard on the radio and on wocrfm.com.
