= Hope Flying Dutchmen football, 2000–2009 =

American college football seasons

2000–2009 Hope Flying Dutchmen football
- Conference: Michigan Intercollegiate Athletic Association
- Head coach: Dean Kreps (1995–2015)
- Home stadium: Holland Municipal Stadium

The Hope Flying Tigers football program, 2000–2009 represented Hope College from 2000 to 2009 in NCAA Division II college football as a member of the Michigan Intercollegiate Athletic Association (MIAA). The team was led by head coaches Dean Kreps (1995–2015).

== 2000 ==
2000 Hope Flying Dutchmen football

MIAA champion
- Conference: Michigan Intercollegiate Athletic Association
- Record: 8–2 (5–0 MIAA)
- Head coach: Dean Kreps (6th season)
- Home stadium: Holland Municipal Stadium

2000 Michigan Intercollegiate Athletic Association football standings
| | Conf. | | | Overall |
| Team | W | | L | W | | L |
|---|---|---|---|---|---|---|
| Hope $^ | 5 | – | 0 | 8 | – | 2 |
| Albion | 3 | – | 2 | 7 | – | 3 |
| Alma | 3 | – | 2 | 6 | – | 4 |
| Kalamazoo | 3 | – | 2 | 5 | – | 4 |
| Adrian | 1 | – | 4 | 2 | – | 8 |
| Olivet | 0 | – | 5 | 2 | – | 8 |
$ – Conference champion; ^ – NCAA Division III playoff participant

The 2000 Hope Flying Dutchmen football team represented Hope College as a member of the Michigan Intercollegiate Athletic Association (MIAA) during the 2000 NCAA Division III football season. In their sixth year under head coach Dean Kreps, the Dutchmen compiled an 8–2 record (5–0 in conference games) and won the MIAA championship.

== 2001 ==
2001 Hope Flying Dutchmen football
- Conference: Michigan Intercollegiate Athletic Association
- Record: 7–2 (4–1 MIAA)
- Head coach: Dean Kreps (7th season)
- Home stadium: Holland Municipal Stadium

2001 Michigan Intercollegiate Athletic Association football standings
| | Conf. | | | Overall |
| Team | W | | L | W | | L |
|---|---|---|---|---|---|---|
| Albion $ | 5 | – | 0 | 8 | – | 2 |
| Hope | 4 | – | 1 | 7 | – | 2 |
| Alma | 3 | – | 2 | 6 | – | 4 |
| Adrian | 2 | – | 3 | 2 | – | 8 |
| Kalamazoo | 1 | – | 4 | 5 | – | 4 |
| Olivet | 0 | – | 5 | 1 | – | 9 |
$ – Conference champion

The 2001 Hope Flying Dutchmen football team represented Hope College as a member of the Michigan Intercollegiate Athletic Association (MIAA) during the 2001 NCAA Division III football season. In their seventh year under head coach Dean Kreps, the Dutchmen compiled a 7–2 record (3–1 in conference games) and finished in second place in the MIAA.

== 2002 ==
2002 Hope Flying Dutchmen football
- Conference: Michigan Intercollegiate Athletic Association
- Record: 5–5 (4–2 MIAA)
- Head coach: Dean Kreps (8th season)
- Home stadium: Holland Municipal Stadium

2002 Michigan Intercollegiate Athletic Association football standings
| | Conf. | | | Overall |
| Team | W | | L | W | | L |
|---|---|---|---|---|---|---|
| Alma $^ | 6 | – | 0 | 9 | – | 2 |
| Hope | 4 | – | 2 | 5 | – | 5 |
| Adrian | 3 | – | 3 | 6 | – | 4 |
| Olivet | 3 | – | 3 | 5 | – | 4 |
| Albion | 3 | – | 3 | 5 | – | 5 |
| Kalamazoo | 2 | – | 5 | 4 | – | 5 |
| Wisconsin Lutheran | 0 | – | 6 | 3 | – | 7 |
$ – Conference champion; ^ – NCAA Division III playoff participant

The 2002 Hope Flying Dutchmen football team represented Hope College as a member of the Michigan Intercollegiate Athletic Association (MIAA) during the 2002 NCAA Division III football season. In their eighth year under head coach Dean Kreps, the Dutchmen compiled a 5–5 record (4–2 in conference games) and finished in second place in the MIAA.

== 2003 ==
2003 Hope Flying Dutchmen football

MIAA champion
- Conference: Michigan Intercollegiate Athletic Association
- Record: 7–4 (5–1 MIAA)
- Head coach: Dean Kreps (9th season)
- Home stadium: Holland Municipal Stadium

2003 Michigan Intercollegiate Athletic Association football standings
| | Conf. | | | Overall |
| Team | W | | L | W | | L |
|---|---|---|---|---|---|---|
| Hope $^ | 5 | – | 1 | 7 | – | 4 |
| Adrian | 4 | – | 2 | 8 | – | 2 |
| Albion | 4 | – | 2 | 6 | – | 4 |
| Alma | 3 | – | 3 | 6 | – | 4 |
| Wisconsin Lutheran | 3 | – | 3 | 5 | – | 5 |
| Kalamazoo | 2 | – | 4 | 6 | – | 4 |
| Olivet | 0 | – | 6 | 4 | – | 6 |
$ – Conference champion; ^ – NCAA Division III playoff participant

The 2003 Hope Flying Dutchmen football team represented Hope College as a member of the Michigan Intercollegiate Athletic Association (MIAA) during the 2003 NCAA Division III football season. In their ninth year under head coach Dean Kreps, the Dutchmen compiled a 7–4 record (5–1 in conference games) and won the MIAA championship.

== 2004 ==
2004 Hope Flying Dutchmen football
- Conference: Michigan Intercollegiate Athletic Association
- Record: 6–4 (5–2 MIAA)
- Head coach: Dean Kreps (10th season)
- Home stadium: Holland Municipal Stadium

2004 Michigan Intercollegiate Athletic Association football standings
| | Conf. | | | Overall |
| Team | W | | L | W | | L |
|---|---|---|---|---|---|---|
| Alma $^ | 6 | – | 1 | 8 | – | 3 |
| Olivet | 5 | – | 2 | 8 | – | 2 |
| Albion | 5 | – | 2 | 7 | – | 3 |
| Hope | 5 | – | 2 | 6 | – | 4 |
| Adrian | 3 | – | 4 | 6 | – | 4 |
| Tri-State * | 2 | – | 5 | 2 | – | 8 |
| Wisconsin Lutheran | 2 | – | 5 | 2 | – | 8 |
| Kalamazoo | 0 | – | 7 | 1 | – | 9 |
$ – Conference champion; ^ – NCAA Division III playoff participant; * – Provisional NCAA Division III member

The 2004 Hope Flying Dutchmen football team represented Hope College as a member of the Michigan Intercollegiate Athletic Association (MIAA) during the 2004 NCAA Division III football season. In their tenth year under head coach Dean Kreps, the Dutchmen compiled a 6–4 record (5–2 in conference games) and finished in a three-way tie for second place in the MIAA.

== 2005 ==
2005 Hope Flying Dutchmen football
- Conference: Michigan Intercollegiate Athletic Association
- Record: 5–5 (5–2 MIAA)
- Head coach: Dean Kreps (11th season)
- Home stadium: Holland Municipal Stadium

2005 Michigan Intercollegiate Athletic Association football standings
| | Conf. | | | Overall |
| Team | W | | L | W | | L |
|---|---|---|---|---|---|---|
| Albion $^ | 6 | – | 1 | 7 | – | 4 |
| Adrian | 5 | – | 2 | 8 | – | 2 |
| Hope | 5 | – | 2 | 5 | – | 5 |
| Alma | 4 | – | 3 | 6 | – | 4 |
| Olivet | 4 | – | 3 | 5 | – | 5 |
| Kalamazoo | 3 | – | 4 | 4 | – | 6 |
| Wisconsin Lutheran | 1 | – | 6 | 1 | – | 9 |
| Tri-State * | 0 | – | 7 | 0 | – | 10 |
$ – Conference champion; ^ – NCAA Division III playoff participant; * – Provisional NCAA Division III member

The 2005 Hope Flying Dutchmen football team represented Hope College as a member of the Michigan Intercollegiate Athletic Association (MIAA) during the 2005 NCAA Division III football season. In their 11th year under head coach Dean Kreps, the Dutchmen compiled a 5–5 record (5–2 in conference games) and tied for second place in the MIAA.

== 2006 ==
2006 Hope Flying Dutchmen football

MIAA champion
- Conference: Michigan Intercollegiate Athletic Association
- Record: 7–4 (7–0 MIAA)
- Head coach: Dean Kreps (12th season)
- Home stadium: Holland Municipal Stadium

2006 Michigan Intercollegiate Athletic Association football standings
| | Conf. | | | Overall |
| Team | W | | L | W | | L |
|---|---|---|---|---|---|---|
| Hope $^ | 7 | – | 0 | 7 | – | 4 |
| Alma | 5 | – | 2 | 6 | – | 4 |
| Olivet | 5 | – | 2 | 6 | – | 4 |
| Adrian | 4 | – | 3 | 5 | – | 5 |
| Albion | 3 | – | 4 | 5 | – | 5 |
| Kalamazoo | 2 | – | 5 | 2 | – | 7 |
| Tri-State # | 2 | – | 5 | 2 | – | 8 |
| Wisconsin Lutheran | 0 | – | 7 | 0 | – | 10 |
$ – Conference champion; ^ – NCAA Division III playoff participant; * – Provisional NCAA Division III member

The 2006 Hope Flying Dutchmen football team represented Hope College as a member of the Michigan Intercollegiate Athletic Association (MIAA) during the 2006 NCAA Division III football season. In their 12th year under head coach Dean Kreps, the Dutchmen compiled a 7–4 record (7–0 in conference games) and won the MIAA championship.

== 2007 ==
2007 Hope Flying Dutchmen football

MIAA champion
- Conference: Michigan Intercollegiate Athletic Association
- Record: 6–4 (6–1 MIAA)
- Head coach: Dean Kreps (13th season)
- Home stadium: Holland Municipal Stadium

2007 Michigan Intercollegiate Athletic Association football standings
| | Conf. | | | Overall |
| Team | W | | L | W | | L |
|---|---|---|---|---|---|---|
| Hope + | 6 | – | 1 | 6 | – | 4 |
| Olivet +^ | 6 | – | 1 | 6 | – | 5 |
| Alma | 5 | – | 2 | 5 | – | 5 |
| Adrian | 4 | – | 3 | 7 | – | 3 |
| Tri-State | 4 | – | 3 | 6 | – | 4 |
| Albion | 2 | – | 5 | 2 | – | 8 |
| Wisconsin Lutheran | 1 | – | 6 | 1 | – | 9 |
| Kalamazoo | 0 | – | 7 | 1 | – | 8 |
+ – Conference co-champions; ^ – NCAA Division III playoff participant

The 2007 Hope Flying Dutchmen football team represented Hope College as a member of the Michigan Intercollegiate Athletic Association (MIAA) during the 2007 NCAA Division III football season. In their 13th year under head coach Dean Kreps, the Dutchmen compiled a 6–4 record (6–1 in conference games) and won the MIAA championship.

== 2008 ==
2008 Hope Flying Dutchmen football
- Conference: Michigan Intercollegiate Athletic Association
- Record: 3–7 (3–3 MIAA)
- Head coach: Dean Kreps (14th season)
- Home stadium: Holland Municipal Stadium

2008 Michigan Intercollegiate Athletic Association football standings
| | Conf. | | | Overall |
| Team | W | | L | W | | L |
|---|---|---|---|---|---|---|
| No. 20 Trine $^ | 6 | – | 0 | 10 | – | 1 |
| Adrian | 5 | – | 1 | 8 | – | 2 |
| Alma | 3 | – | 3 | 5 | – | 5 |
| Albion | 3 | – | 3 | 4 | – | 6 |
| Hope | 3 | – | 3 | 3 | – | 7 |
| Kalamazoo | 1 | – | 5 | 2 | – | 8 |
| Olivet | 0 | – | 6 | 1 | – | 9 |
$ – Conference champion; ^ – NCAA Division III playoff participant; Rankings from D3football.com

The 2008 Hope Flying Dutchmen football team represented Hope College as a member of the Michigan Intercollegiate Athletic Association (MIAA) during the 2008 NCAA Division III football season. In their 14th year under head coach Dean Kreps, the Dutchmen compiled a 3–7 record (3–3 in conference games) and finished in a three-way tie for third place in the MIAA.

== 2009 ==
2009 Hope Flying Dutchmen football
- Conference: Michigan Intercollegiate Athletic Association
- Record: 3–7 (3–3 MIAA)
- Head coach: Dean Kreps (15th season)
- Home stadium: Holland Municipal Stadium

2009 Michigan Intercollegiate Athletic Association football standings
| | Conf. | | | Overall |
| Team | W | | L | W | | L |
|---|---|---|---|---|---|---|
| No. 17 Trine $^ | 6 | – | 0 | 10 | – | 2 |
| Adrian | 4 | – | 2 | 6 | – | 4 |
| Albion | 4 | – | 2 | 4 | – | 6 |
| Alma | 3 | – | 3 | 5 | – | 5 |
| Hope | 3 | – | 3 | 3 | – | 7 |
| Kalamazoo | 1 | – | 5 | 4 | – | 6 |
| Olivet | 0 | – | 6 | 0 | – | 10 |
$ – Conference champion; ^ – NCAA Division III playoff participant; Rankings from D3football.com

The 2009 Hope Flying Dutchmen football team represented Hope College as a member of the Michigan Intercollegiate Athletic Association (MIAA) during the 2009 NCAA Division III football season. In their 15th year under head coach Dean Kreps, the Dutchmen compiled a 3–7 record (3–3 in conference games) and tied for fourth place in the MIAA.
