= Dominic Livedoti =

American sports coach and administrator (born 1942)

Biographical details
- Born: November 25, 1942 (age 83)
- Education: Olivet College (B.A., 1965); Eastern Michigan University (M.S., 1970)

Playing career

Football
- 1961–1964: Olivet

Baseball
- 1962–1965: Olivet
- Positions: Wide receiver (football); Shortstop (baseball)

Coaching career (HC unless noted)

Football
- ?–1987: West Bloomfield HS (MI)
- 1988–1992: Olivet
- 1993–1994: Wayne State (MI) (assistant)
- 1995–1996: Wayne State (MI)
- 2005–2009: Olivet

Baseball
- 1988–1993: Olivet

Administrative career (AD unless noted)
- 2008–2009: Olivet

Head coaching record
- Overall: 44–71–3 (college football); 65–111 (college baseball)
- Tournaments: Football; 0–1 (NCAA D-III playoffs)

Accomplishments and honors

Championships
- Football; 2 MIAA (1991*, 2007); *Forfeited

Awards
- Olivet College Athletic Hall of Fame (2006)

Dominic Livedoti (born November 25, 1942) is an American former football and baseball coach and college athletics administrator.

== Head coaching record ==
=== College ===
Year	Team	Overall	Conference	Standing	Bowl/playoffs
Olivet Comets (Michigan Intercollegiate Athletic Association) (1988–1992)
1988	Olivet	4–4–1	2–2–1	4th	
1989	Olivet	4–5	1–4	T–5th	
1990	Olivet	4–5	3–2	3rd	
1991	Olivet	7–1–1	4–0–1	T–1st	
1992	Olivet	2–6–1	2–3	T–3rd	
Wayne State Tartars (Midwest Intercollegiate Football Conference) (1995–1996)
1995	Wayne State	3–8	3–7	T–8th	
1996	Wayne State	2–9	2–8	T–9th	
Wayne State:		5–17	5–15		
Olivet Comets (Michigan Intercollegiate Athletic Association) (2005–2009)
2005	Olivet	5–5	4–3	T–4th	
2006	Olivet	6–4	5–2	T–2nd	
2007	Olivet	6–5	6–1	T–1st	L NCAA Division III First Round
2008	Olivet	1–9	0–6	7th	
2009	Olivet	0–10	0–6	7th	
Olivet:		39–54–3	27–29–2		
Total:		44–71–3			
National championship Conference title Conference division title or championship game berth
