= Alpha Lambda Epsilon =

Social and literary society at the University of Olivet

- ΑΛΕ
- Coat of Arms of Alpha Lambda Epsilon
- Founded: 1922; 104 years ago Olivet, Michigan, US
- Type: Social
- Affiliation: Independent
- Status: Active
- Emphasis: Literary
- Scope: Local
- Motto: "Bear Well the Torch"
- Colors: Maroon, Yellow, and White
- Symbol: Torch and Bible
- Flower: Yellow rose
- Chapters: 1
- Nickname: Alpha E
- Logo
- Headquarters: 212 S Main Street; Olivet, Michigan 49076; United States
- Website: alphalambdaepsilon.org

Alpha Lambda Epsilon (ΑΛΕ) is a coeducation social and literary society at the University of Olivet in Olivet, Michigan, United States. It was established in 1922 as a sorority and became coed in 1975.

== History ==
Alpha Lambda Epsilon was established as a sorority at Olivet College in 1922. It was chartered as a service and literary organization. In November 1922, it had sixteen pledges.

In the 1920s, the sorority held programs that featured music and plays performed by its members. It also hosted an annual formal party for the campus that featured an orchestra. In December 1923, the sorority purchased the former home of A. H. Claflin on Yale Street in Olivet, to use as a meeting place; however, it did not occupy the house until September 1924.

In January 1975, ten male students rushed the sorority, indicating that they were tired of the campus fraternity's hazing and liked the service orientation of Alpha Lambda Epsilon. The sorority decided to open its membership to men because of financial problems and a lack of funds to make house payments. Its spring 1975 pledge class included ten men and seventeen women. With the addition of male members Alpha Lambda Epsilon became a coeducational social and literary society in 1975.

Its headquarters is in the Longman House at 212 South Main Street.

== Symbols ==
Alpha Lambda Epsilon's motto is "Bear Well the Torch". Its colors are maroon, yellow, and white. Its symbols are a torch and the Bible. Its flower is the yellow rose. Its nickname is Alpha E.

== Activities ==
Alpha Lambda Epsilon and the Olivet Lions Club co-sponsor an annual Easter egg hunt and carnival for children.

== Controversies ==
On October 31, 1991, a male student was stabbed by a non-student in the Alpha Lambda Epsilon house over a dispute about a woman.

== See also ==
- List of social fraternities
