= Peter Stuursma =

American football player and coach (born 1971)

Current position
- Title: Head coach
- Team: Hope
- Conference: MIAA
- Record: 74–20

Biographical details
- Born: January 29, 1971 (age 55)
- Education: Hope College (B.A., 1993); University of Northern Colorado (M.A., 1998)

Playing career

Football
- 1989–1992: Hope
- Position: Running back

Coaching career (HC unless noted)

Football
- 1994–1996: Forest Hills Central HS (MI) (assistant)
- 1997: Northern Colorado (GA)
- 1999: Hope (DC)
- 2000–2015: East Grand Rapids HS (MI)
- 2016–present: Hope

Ice hockey
- 1994–1997: Forest Hills Central HS (MI)

Head coaching record
- Overall: 74–20 (college football); 162–34 (high school football)
- Tournaments: 1–3 (NCAA D-III playoffs)

Accomplishments and honors

Championships
- 3 MIAA (2019, 2021, 2024); 7 MHSAA (2002–2003, 2006–2010)

Peter Stuursma (born January 29, 1971) is an American college football coach. He is the head football coach for Hope College, a position he has held since 2016.

== Head coaching record ==
=== College football ===
| Year | Team | Overall | Conference | Standing | Bowl/playoffs | D3^{#} | AFCA^{°} |
|---|---|---|---|---|---|---|---|
Hope Flying Dutchmen (Michigan Intercollegiate Athletic Association) (2016–present)
| 2016 | Hope | 7–3 | 5–1 | 2nd | | | |
| 2017 | Hope | 8–2 | 5–1 | 2nd | | | |
| 2018 | Hope | 8–2 | 6–1 | 2nd | | | |
| 2019 | Hope | 9–2 | 7–0 | 1st | L NCAA Division III First Round | | |
| 2020–21 | No team—COVID-19 | | | | | | |
| 2021 | Hope | 8–2 | 5–1 | T–1st | | | |
| 2022 | Hope | 6–4 | 3–3 | T–3rd | | | |
| 2023 | Hope | 8–2 | 5–1 | 2nd | | | |
| 2024 | Hope | 11–1 | 7–0 | 1st | L NCAA Division III Third Round | 15 | 15 |
| 2025 | Hope | 9–2 | 6–1 | 2nd | L NCAA Division III Second Round | 19 | 17 |
| 2026 | Hope | 0–0 | 0–0 | | | | |
| Hope: | | 74–20 | 49–9 | | | | |
| Total: | | 74–20 | | | | | |
National championship Conference title Conference division title or championship game berth
