= Dean Kreps =

American football player and coach (born 1961)

Biographical details
- Born: December 13, 1961 (age 64)

Playing career
- 1981–1984: Monmouth (IL)

Coaching career (HC unless noted)
- 1984–1985: Illinois (GA)
- 1986–1990: Hope (DL)
- 1991–1994: Hope (DC)
- 1995–2015: Hope

Head coaching record
- Overall: 109–97
- Tournaments: 0–3 (NCAA D-III playoffs)

Accomplishments and honors

Championships
- 6 MIAA (1997, 1999–2000, 2003, 2006–2007)

M. Dean Kreps (born December 13, 1961) is an American former college football player and coach. He served as the head football coach at Hope College, in Holland, Michigan, from 1995 to 2015, compiling a record of 109–97. Kreps guided the Flying Dutchmen to six Michigan Intercollegiate Athletic Association (MIAA) championships.

== Head coaching record ==
Year	Team	Overall	Conference	Standing	Bowl/playoffs
Hope Flying Dutchmen (Michigan Intercollegiate Athletic Association) (1995–2015)
1995	Hope	2–7	1–4	5th	
1996	Hope	4–5	3–2	2nd	
1997	Hope	6–3	4–1	1st	
1998	Hope	5–4	4–2	2nd	
1999	Hope	5–4	5–1	1st	
2000	Hope	8–2	5–0	1st	L NCAA Division III First Round
2001	Hope	7–2	4–1	2nd	
2002	Hope	5–5	4–2	2nd	
2003	Hope	7–4	5–1	1st	L NCAA Division III First Round
2004	Hope	6–4	5–2	2nd	
2005	Hope	5–5	4–2	2nd	
2006	Hope	7–4	7–0	1st	L NCAA Division III First Round
2007	Hope	6–4	6–1	1st	
2008	Hope	3–7	3–3	3rd	
2009	Hope	3–7	3–3	3rd	
2010	Hope	3–7	3–3	4th	
2011	Hope	7–3	5–1	2nd	
2012	Hope	5–5	4–2	3rd	
2013	Hope	7–3	4–2	T–2nd	
2014	Hope	6–4	3–3	T-4th	
2015	Hope	2–8	0–6	7th	
Hope:		109–97	83–38		
Total:		109–97			
National championship Conference title Conference division title or championship game berth
