= Dustin Beurer =

American football coach

Current position
- Title: Head coach
- Team: Northwood
- Conference: G-MAC
- Record: 20–14

Biographical details
- Born: Deerfield, Michigan, U.S.
- Education: Albion College (2005); Morehead State University

Playing career
- 2001–2003: Albion
- Position: Offensive lineman

Coaching career (HC unless noted)
- 2005: Albion (TE/assistant OL)
- 2006–2007: Morehead State (TE/FB/assistant OL)
- 2008–2018: Albion (AHC/OC)
- 2019–2022: Albion
- 2023–present: Northwood

Head coaching record
- Overall: 49–19
- Tournaments: 0–1 (NCAA D-III playoffs); 0–1 (NCAA D-II playoffs)

Accomplishments and honors

Championships
- 2 MIAA (2020–2021)

Dustin Beurer is an American college football coach. He is the head football coach for Northwood University, a position he has held since 2023. Beurer served as the head football coach at Albion College in Albion, Michigan from 2019 to 2022.

== Coaching career ==
=== Albion ===
Beurer was named head coach of Albion on September 6, 2018. He was promoted from his roles as assistant head coach, offensive coordinator, and recruiting coordinator to succeed longtime head coach Craig Rundle, who retired.

== Head coaching record ==
Year	Team	Overall	Conference	Standing	Bowl/playoffs
Albion Britons (Michigan Intercollegiate Athletic Association) (2019–2022)
2019	Albion	8–2	5–2	T–2nd	
2020–21	Albion	3–0	3–0	1st	
2021	Albion	9–2	5–1	T–1st	L NCAA Division III First Round
2022	Albion	9–1	5–1	2nd	
Albion:		29–5	18–4		
Northwood Timberwolves (Great Midwest Athletic Conference) (2023–present)
2023	Northwood	5–6	5–4	5th	
2024	Northwood	6–5	4–5	T–5th	
2025	Northwood	9–3	7–2	3rd	L NCAA Division II First Round
Northwood:		20–14	16–11		
Total:		49–19			
National championship Conference title Conference division title or championship game berth
^{†}Indicates Bowl Coalition, Bowl Alliance, BCS, or CFP / New Years' Six bowl.
