= James C. Harrison =

American artist

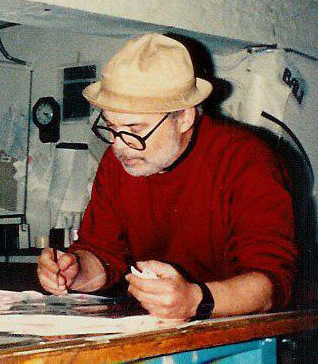
- James Harrison at work in his studio
- Born: November 27, 1925; Detroit, Michigan, U.S.
- Died: November 4, 1990 (aged 64); Brooklyn, New York, New York, U.S.
- Education: Cass Technical High School; Cranbrook Academy of Art; Olivet College
- Known for: Painting, Drawing, Mixed Media, Print Making, Pottery

James C. Harrison (November 27, 1925 – November 4, 1990) was a Detroit, Michigan artist based in Brooklyn, New York. His work is complex, layered and full of Jungian, religious and mystical references used to relay his internal battles and demons. Harrison drew inspiration from mythology, psychiatry, poetry, music, philosophy and artists of the past. His ever-evolving style - often equated to Cy Twombly, Robert Rauschenberg and other contemporaries - always maintained a cutting-edge quality that was anchored in his own deep philosophical tendencies.

== Life and education ==
Born in Detroit, Michigan on November 27, 1925, James Carter Harrison (after Howard Carter the British archaeologist who excavated King Tut's tomb) Harrison attended Cass Technical High School in Detroit and graduated in 1943 with a degree in commercial art. He went on to attend both the Cranbrook Academy of Art (1944) and Olivet College (1946) for only a single term each, before realizing that a traditional educational setting was not agreeable with him. Thus, he became largely a self-taught artist.

Harrison was awarded and sponsored by Professor Wallace Fowlie of Duke University to attend a three-month residency in 1948 at Yaddo (artist colony) in Saratoga Springs, New York.

In 1950, Harrison moved to New York and worked as a color mixer for a textile manufacturer to support himself, still with aspirations of becoming a recognized artist.

While in New York, Harrison surrounded himself with a group of friends that included James Baldwin and photographers Doug Quackenbush and Larry Clark. He drew inspiration from Jazz, a passion that ignited in him since his beginnings in Detroit, the philosophies of Carl Jung and became more and more consumed by an addiction to drugs and alcohol. From the late 1950s throughout the 1970s he was featured in numerous group exhibitions, but it wasn't until the 1980s that he finally gained recognition of his own right. In 1983, he had his first solo exhibition at A Place Apart Gallery in Brooklyn, New York, and in 1987, the LedisFlam Gallery presented his unaided exhibition, "Forty Year Retrospective".

After a long-standing battle with alcohol and drug abuse, Harrison died from liver failure on November 4, 1990, in Brooklyn, New York.

== Career ==
Harrison was prolific in numerous mediums including prints, mixed media, assemblage and paintings. While his early work has been compared to both Cy Twombly and Robert Rauschenberg, his later pieces show a distinct change in inspiration. Even though Harrison's work evolved dramatically during the course of his career, it consistently demonstrated his fierce need for self-expression; art served as both a physical and emotional catharsis for Harrison.

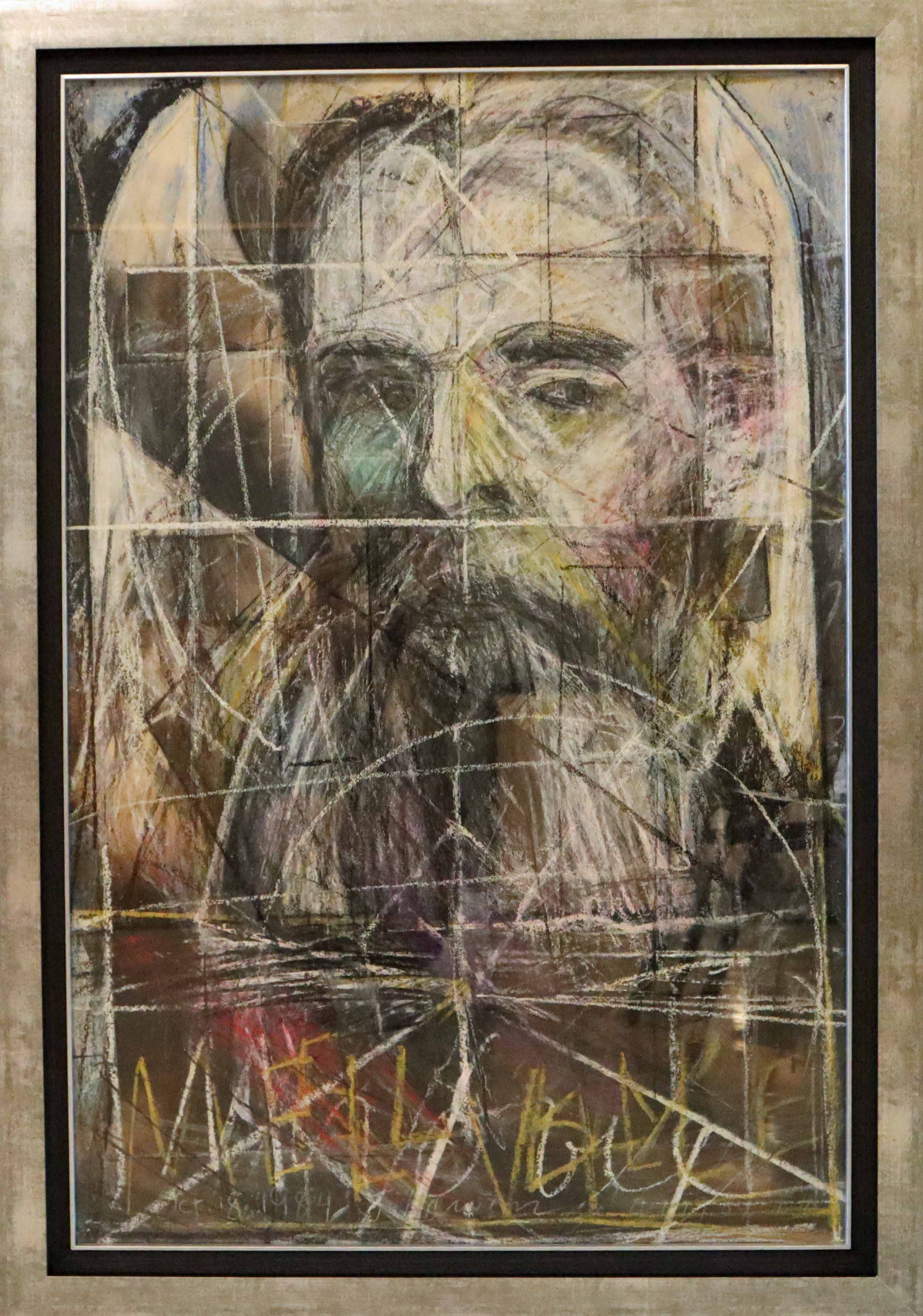
Melville by James C. Harrison

Early on in his career, Harrison befriended Twombly. Trinkett Clark of the Chrysler Museum writes "the artists exchanged ideas and stylistic tendencies; however, Harrison had stronger connections to the art and goals of Alberto Giacometti. During the 1950s Harrison work reflected what he termed formal "arrangements" that examine the potential of a monochromatic palette as they suggest an elusive being."

The 1960s were a personal crisis for Harrison. He could not support himself with his art and retreated, like many did, into a private netherworld governed by alcohol and drugs. These substances allowed him to explore his subconscious. His paintings from these years document a voyage into his struggling, tormented soul, an uncensored excursion into his agonizing nightmares.

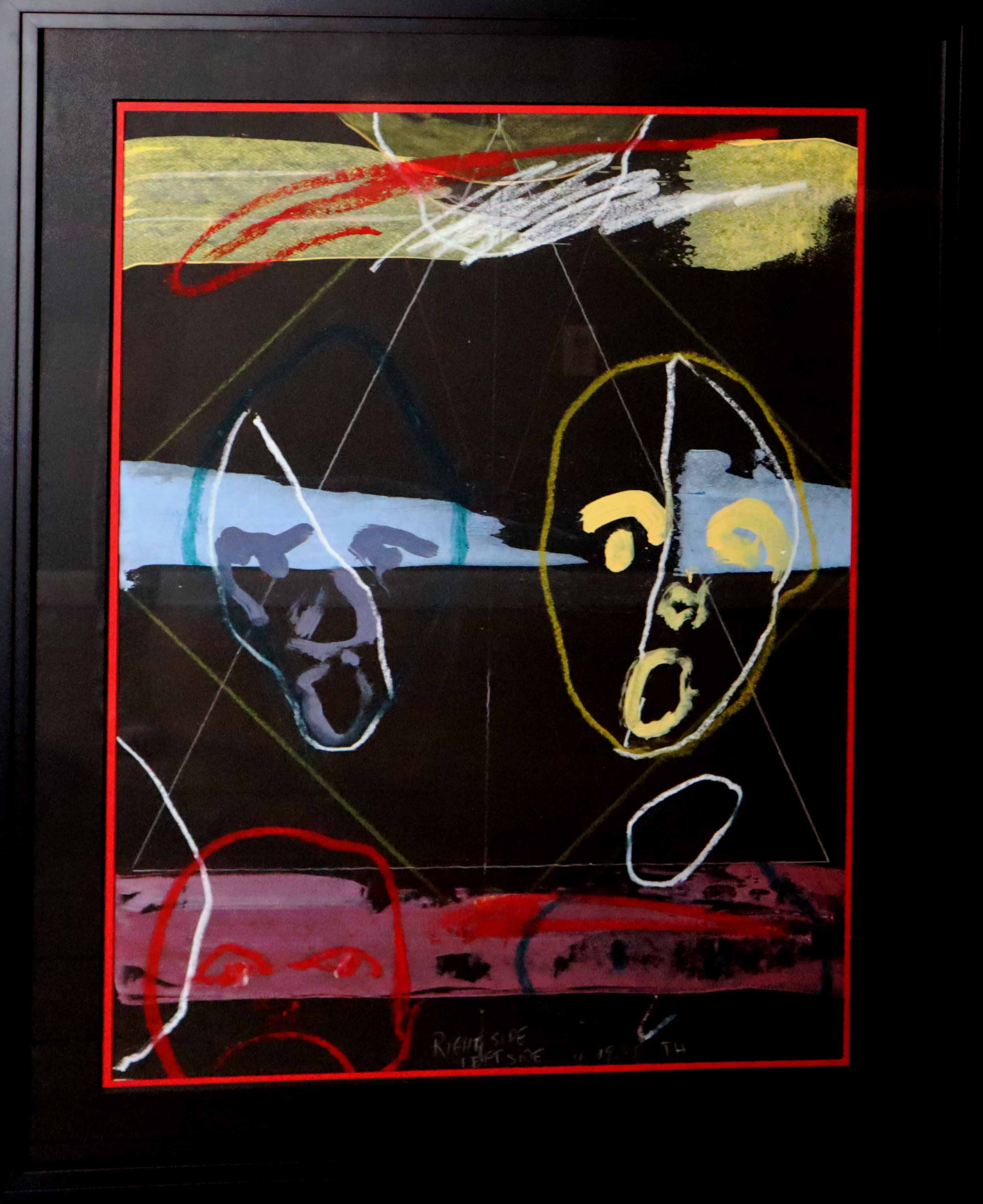
Right Side/ Left Side by James C. Harrison

In 1966, Harrison's ongoing battle with drugs and alcohol forced him to be hospitalized. It was after this period that he experienced a Renaissance of sorts which, thus, greatly affected his form of artistic expression. Drawing became the predominant focus for his artwork, or what he himself called "paint-drawing". His work maintained both a graphic and European quality, yet his style was constantly progressing, always striking, vibrant, and somewhat abstract.

Harrison's work at this time was rooted in an organic, transcendental concept of the sublime in which the individual psychology is always cradled. Peter Acheson, a Brooklyn artist, contributor to the Brooklyn Rail, described Harrison in a review.

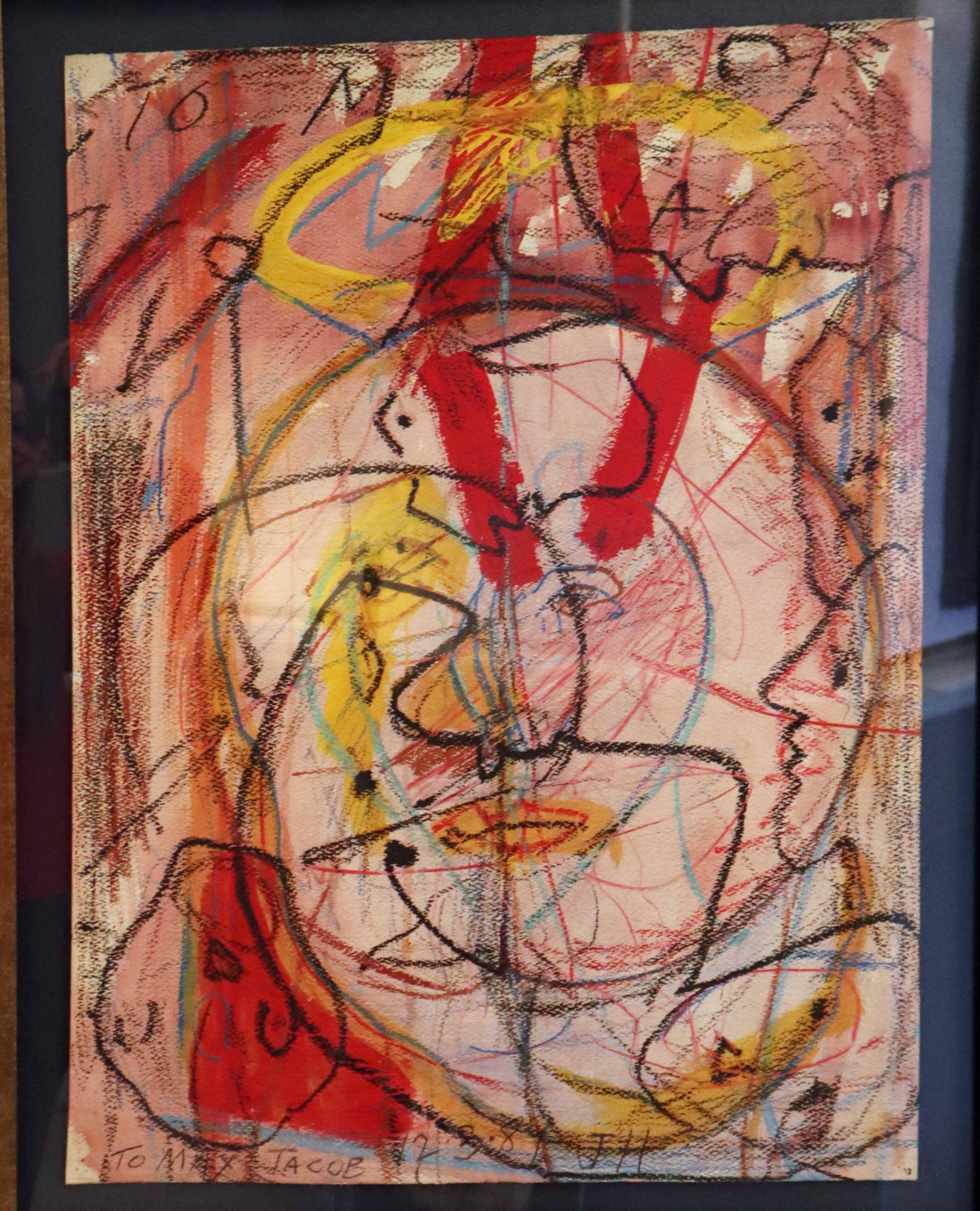
To Max Jacob by James C. Harrison

James Harrison saw himself as a link in a chain of visionary artists. He did not necessarily prefer religious imagery. His eye saw quality in artists as diverse as Leonard Baskin and Franz Kline. To Harrison, ALL images were religious, in that the contents of the imagination were sacred. He understood that imaging and dreaming were processes; the point of modern art was to reveal the process as much as the resulting images. He read his drawings as texts of the Collective Unconscious, where meaning is elusive, changeable, layered, and funny. Baroque webs and fiery geometries dance together, delineating, as James Hillman calls archetypes, "the skeletal structures of the psyche".

In 1982, under a program sponsored by the New York Department of Cultural Affairs, to expiate his public assistance, Harrison started working part time for a non-profit gallery in Greenpoint called A Place Apart. There he met a younger generation of artist; Chris Martin, Peter Acheson, Kathy Bradford and David Kapp are among some, who were quite taken with him and his work. And at their encouragement he began to actively seek an audience for his work again.

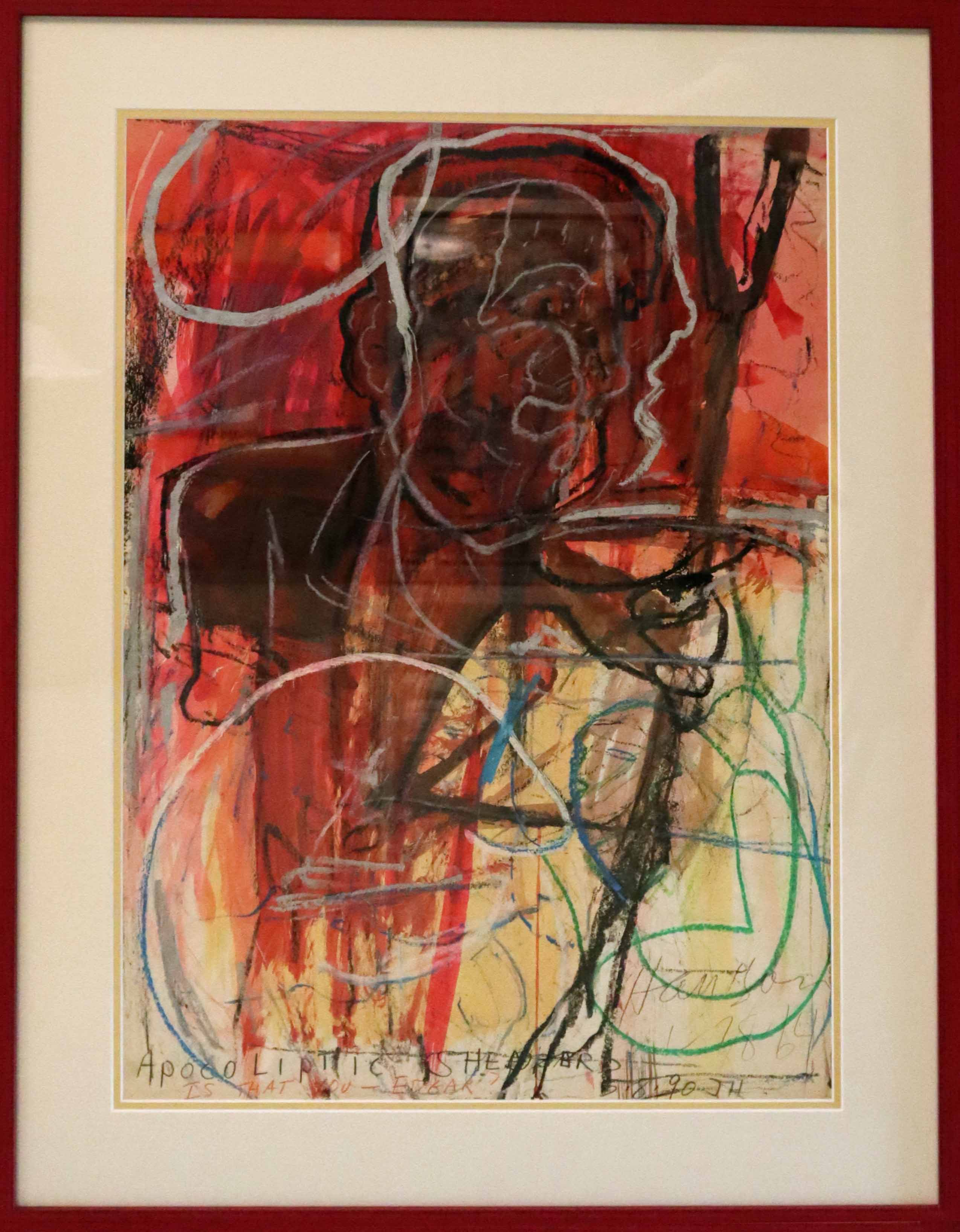
Apocalyptic Shepherd by James C. Harrison

Loren Munk, a working artist living in New York who writes under the pseudonym, James Kalm, describes A Place Apart Gallery in an article as:

A community gallery for artist of all ages and backgrounds is generally recognized as the first in Williamsburg. This venue opened in 1982 and operated by Marquerite Munch, is where Chris Martin remembers meeting James Harrison, a legendary Brooklyn eccentric who worked the desk and ended up becoming a mentor to many young artists in Greenpoint and the 'Burg.'

Up until his death, Harrison painted. At this time, he was undergoing another kind of spiritual rejuvenation which is apparent in the vibrantly colored works produced in the late 80s. Harrison was also exhibiting regularly, gaining recognition and beginning to obtain critical acclaim. Harrison's quest for self-discovery and his private theology of light were themes that he considered for many years. The majority of his paintings and drawings bear multiple dates indicating that they were reworked, enforcing an intense introspection and attests to his poverty and obscurity: the vast majority of his works were never seen or offered for sale.

In 2006, the New York Times art critic Ken Johnson reviewed James Harrison. The article pertaining to a posthumous show held at the Luise Ross Gallery in the spring states:

Harrison's works from the 50s and 60s, grid-based compositions made under the influence of Twombly and Rauschenberg, are light and airy but uninteresting compared with the later works.

In the 1970s and 80s, James Harrison produced a remarkable body of densely worked, visionary paintings and drawing that have lately acquired a local cult following. His paintings look like collaborations between William Blake, Albert Pinkham Ryder and Alberto Giacometti. Androgynous figures, who wander in the woods, are crucified or are conveyed heavenward; temple facades; and glowing mandalas, triangles and pyramids all emerge from layers of muddy paint and webs of lines that threaten to obliterate anything recognizable.

Prolonged study might reveal a coherent system of symbols and cosmic psychology underwriting Harrison' art. What is more immediately compelling is the tension between recognizable mystical imagery and painterly obfuscation, which might be read as a metaphor for the artist's struggle to transcend his own psychic chaos.

== Exhibitions ==
- 1983: A Place Apart Gallery, Brooklyn, NY
- 1987: "Four Year Retrospective", LedisFlam, Brooklyn, NY
- 1988: Galerie Vincent Steinmetz, Amsterdam, Netherlands
- 1988: Shaffy Cultural Center, Amsterdam, Netherlands
- 1989: Addison Ripley Gallery, Washington, DC
- 1989: Dart Gallery, Chicago, IL
- 1989: Galerie Brinkman, Amsterdam, Netherlands
- 1989: LedisFlam, Brooklyn, NY
- 1989: Martha Schaeffer Fine Arts, New York, NY
- 1990: "James Harrison: Portraits 1955-1990", LedisFlam, New York, NY
- 1992: "James Harrison", Parameters Galleries, the Chrysler Museum, Norfolk, VA
- 2006: Luise Ross Gallery, Chelsea, NY
- 2015: "A Life's Work - James Harrison", Schmidt's Antiques Inc., Ypsilanti, MI
- 2016: "James C. Harrison: Retrospective of Personal Artwork", Detroit Design Center, Detroit, MI
- 2016: "Remembering Myself", Schmidt's Antiques Inc., Ypsilanti, MI
- 2017: "Buried Alive", Elephant Room Gallery, Chicago, IL,
- 2017: "Investigating Identity" at Kreft Gallery, Concordia University, Ann Arbor, MI
- 2017: "Stepping out of Darkness" at the Michigan Modernism show in Southfield, Michigan
- 2019: "Imaging Each Other: James C. Harrison & Darin Latimer Art Show", Schmidt's Antiques Inc., Ypsilanti, MI
