= Burt E. Kennedy =

American football and basketball coach (1883–1935)

Biographical details
- Born: February 22, 1883; Iowa, U.S.
- Died: July 16, 1935 (aged 52); Buenos Aires, Argentina
- Education: Simpson (1904); Olivet (1908)

Playing career

Football
- c. 1903: Simpson (IA)

Coaching career (HC unless noted)

Football
- 1904–1907: Olivet
- 1908–1913: Lake Forest

Basketball
- 1906–1907: Olivet
- 1908–1914: Lake Forest

Administrative career (AD unless noted)
- 1904–1908: Olivet
- 1908–1914: Lake Forest

Head coaching record
- Overall: 50–15–6 (football); 59–38 (basketball)

Accomplishments and honors

Championships
- Football; 1 MIAA (1906)

Burt E. Kennedy (February 22, 1883 – July 16, 1935) was an American college football and college basketball coach. He served as the head football coach at Olivet College—now known as the University of Olivet—in Olivet, Michigan from 1904 to 1907 and Lake Forest College in Lake Forest, Illinois from 1908 to 1913.

== Early life ==
Kennedy was originally from Lake Forest, Illinois, and graduated from Simpson College, in Indianola, Iowa, in 1904. He played football at Simpson, earning All-Iowa honors for three consecutive seasons.

== Coaching career ==
Kennedy served as the head football coach, head basketball coach, and athletic director at Olivet College in Olivet, Michigan for four years beginning in 1904.

In 1908, Kennedy was appointed athletic director, coach, and mathematics instructor at Lake Forest College in Lake Forest, Illinois. He served as Lake Forest's head basketball coach from 1908 to 1914, leading his teams to a record of 58–20 in six seasons. Kennedy stepped down from his role at Lake Forest in the spring of 1914, and planned to go into business.

== Later life and death ==
In 1914, Kennedy began working with Swift & Company of Chicago. In 1919, he was appointed general manager for Swift International in South America. He died on July 16, 1935, in Buenos Aires, from injuries he sustained in an automobile accident several days earlier. Kennedy was the brother of Walter S. Kennedy, who was also a college football and college basketball coach and later a newspaper publisher.

== Head coaching record ==
=== Football ===
Year	Team	Overall	Conference	Standing	Bowl/playoffs
Olivet Crimson (Michigan Intercollegiate Athletic Association) (1904–1907)
1904	Olivet	5–3	4–2		
1905	Olivet	4–4	3–3	T–3rd	
1906	Olivet	5–0–1	5–0–1	1st	
1907	Olivet	7–2	5–1		
Olivet:		21–9–1	17–6–1		
Lake Forest Foresters (Independent) (1908–1913)
1908	Lake Forest	4–1–1			
1909	Lake Forest	5–1–1			
1910	Lake Forest	5–2			
1911	Lake Forest	5–1–1			
1912	Lake Forest	5–0–1			
1913	Lake Forest	5–1–1			
Lake Forest:		29–6–5			
Total:		50–15–6			
National championship Conference title Conference division title or championship game berth
