= Edith Vosburgh Alvord =

American suffragist and clubwoman (1875–1962)

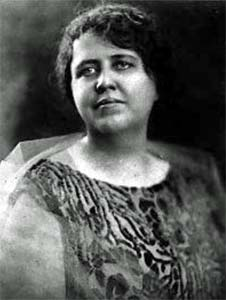
- Born: 1875; Battle Creek, Michigan, United States
- Died: 1962 (aged 86–87)
- Education: Olivet College
- Occupation: Educator
- Known for: Women's suffrage activism
- Movement: Woman's club movement
- Spouse: W. R. Alvord (m. 1908)

Edith Vosburgh Alvord (1875–1962) was an American suffragist and active Detroit clubwoman.

== Biography ==
Alvord was born in Battle Creek, Michigan, in 1875. At twenty years old (in 1895), she began attending Olivet College, where she would graduate in 1899. After graduating, she was employed as an English and Latin teacher, teaching in Morris, Illinois. After marrying W. R. Alvord in 1908, she moved to Detroit. The first club she became involved in was the Twentieth Century Club of Detroit, which she would be elected president of in 1913. She was president for a short time, before resigning to take the presidency of the Detroit Federation of Women's Clubs, and later would become the president of the Michigan Federation of Women's Clubs. While still at Detroit, she heavily advocated for women's suffrage and a law that would require bakers to package their bread more completely, the latter of which was eventually passed.

In her work with education, Alvord served as the president of the Highland Park School Board (the first woman to do so) and founded the first tax-supported nursery school.

She worked in the Women's Auxiliary of The Salvation Army, the Wayne County War Preparedness Board, served on the Metropolitan Detroit YWCA board of directors, and was a delegate for Michigan at the Illiteracy Conference of Northern and Western States.

In 1920, the Women's World Congress approached her, asking her to run for the president of the United States, which she did not do. In 1922 she considered a run for Congress, which she decided against.

She died in 1962. Alvord was inducted into the Michigan Women's Hall of Fame in 1993 to honor her work in the areas of suffrage and community service. Her papers are included in the Burton Historical Collection (BHC) of the Detroit Public Library.

== List of memberships ==
- Detroit Citizen's League
- Detroit Federation of Women's Clubs
- Detroit New Century Club
- General Federation of Women's Clubs
- Metropolitan Detroit YWCA
- Michigan Federation of Women's Clubs
- Wayne County War Preparedness Board
- Women's Auxiliary of the Salvation Army
