= WOCR =

Coordinates: 42.442°N 84.925°W

Olivet, Michigan; United States
- Broadcast area
- Frequency: 89.1 MHz
- Branding: The One

Programming
- Format: Variety; College student station

Ownership
- Owner: Olivet College Board of Trustees

History
- First air date: April 30, 1975; 50 years ago
- Call sign meaning: Olivet College Radio

Technical information
- Licensing authority: FCC
- Class: A
- Power: 500 watts

Links
- Public license information: Public file; LMS
- Webcast: Listen Live
- Website: www.wocr891fm.com

WOCR (89.1 MHz) — branded 89-1 The One — is a non-commercial FM campus radio station located in Olivet, Michigan. The student-operated station, on the air 24/7, broadcasts on 89.1 FM and is owned by Olivet College Board of Trustees.

The station operates with 500 watts of power centering on the immediate Olivet area.

WOCR came on the air in 1975 as a 10 watt FM educational license radio station operating at a frequency of 89.7. Charles G. Mefford was the first general manager, obtaining an FCC license and the WOCR call letters, building the studios/tower and training a staff. He put the station on air with the help of Olivet College professors, Robert C. Fisher and Willis "Bill" Seldon and the eventual second general manager and student, Michael Oyster. A new transmitter a few years later took WOCR up to 125 watts of power until October 2010, WOCR operated on 89.7 with 125 watts of power. In certain areas the station would interfere with the signal of 89.7 WLNZ in Lansing; the frequency shift to 89.1 has alleviated this issue. WLNZ has since been granted a construction permit to increase power to 1,000 watts from its current 420.

WOCR "The One" is a full-service campus radio station featuring music, campus information, and sports programming, including play-by-play of Olivet College and local high school teams.

WOCR is the official station for Olivet Comets football and broadcasts all home and away games.

== Personnel ==
=== Station managers ===
- 89.7 Olivet College Radio
- 1. Charles G. "Chuck" Mefford 1973-1976
- 2. Michael Oyster 1976-1977
- 3. Dana Potts 1977
- 4. Tom Trubac 1978
- 5. William Healy 1978-1979
- 6. George Pohly 1979-1980
- 7. Lisa Barry 1980
- 8. Stuart Blacklaw 1981
- 9. Mark Cooper 1982
- 10. Vincent Wheat 1982-1983
- 11. Steven R Hoover 1983-1984
- 12. Mary Frances Smith 1984-1985
- 13. James C Shadduck 1985-1986
- 14. Lisa Waltz 1986-1987
- --- Lisa Waltz-Cook FALL 1987
- 15. Norine N Boyd SPRING 1988
- 16. Chris Parkinson 1988-1989
- 17. Janice Meisel SUMMER 1989
- 18. Dan Davis FALL 1989
- 19. Deb Breiling SPRING 1990
- 20. Paul H Ensley 1991-1992
- 21. Jason Houchins 1992-1994
- 22. Mike Adams 1994-1995
- 23. Carlos Sims 1995-1997
- 24. Richard Craig 1997-1999
- 25. Bill Bridges 1999-2000
- 26. Chad Carlisle 2000-2001
- 27. William E Shrubb III 2001-2002
- 28. Brian Ward 2002
- 28. Elliot Hitchcock 2002-2003
- 29. Jason Wright 2003-2004
- 30. Nya Taryor 2004-2005
- 31. Karolyn Batt 2005-2007
- 32. John E Shull 2007-2009
- REBRANDED AS 89.1 THE ONE WOCR
- 33. Elizabeth F Mitchell 2009-2012
- 34. Adrienne Plourde 2012-2014
- 35. Travis Oberlin 2014-2016
- 36. Danny Neugent 2016
- 37. Co-Managers: 2016-2017
- 37a. Corey Hricovsky
- 37b. Bill Morris
- 37c. Matt Scher
- 38d. Thomas Gary-Homes
- 39. Corey Hricovsky 2017-2018
- 40. Crissta Ames SPRING 2018
- 41. Zack Evans 2018–present

=== Faculty advisers ===
- Gary Smith
- Joanne Williams
- Daine Pavloski

=== Sports directors ===
- Daine Pavloski 2011-2013
- Travis Oberlin 2013-2016
- Matt Scher 2016–2020

=== On-air talent ===
- Chuck Mefford 1975-1976
- Perry LaHaie 1981-1983
- Mike Oyster
- John Shull
- Da Sooper Yooper 1990-1994
- Demetris Mayberry "HypeRadio" 2006-2010
- Daine Pavloski "Professor of JMC at Olivet College" 2009-2013
- Lindsey Basye
- Jefferson Matthews- "Play-By-Play, Initial Sports Director" 2005-2009
- Matthew Weaver- "Color Commentator, Initiator of WOCR's High School Football Broadcasts" 2009-2013
- Brittany Hayes
- Ashley Mallo 2011-2013
- Brittany Turner 2012-2013
- Kristen Sharpley 2012-2013
- Raquel Mazur 2012-2014
- Hailey Willett 2012-2013, 2016
- Andrew Brent 2012
- Adam Gross (2009–2013) and Mikeal Kennedy (2011–2014) "The Petition for Common Sense (2012–2013)"
- Morgan Hall 2013-2014
- Tyler Gross 2013-2014
- Travis Oberlin
- Amber Hamad
- Kori Ramirez
- DJ Tate 5
