= Travis Wiltzius =

American football coach

Biographical details
- Born: Escanaba, Michigan, U.S.
- Education: Bay de Noc Community College (2010); Central Michigan University (2013, 2015)

Coaching career (HC unless noted)
- 2007–2009: Escanaba Senior HS (MI) (DL)
- 2010–2011: Central Michigan (student manager)
- 2012: Central Michigan (intern)
- 2013: Central Michigan (OQC)
- 2014: Central Michigan (GA)
- 2015–2016: Finlandia (OL)
- 2017: Finlandia (AHC/OL)
- 2018–2021: Finlandia

Head coaching record
- Overall: 0–20

Travis Wiltzius is an American football coach. He served as the head football coach at Finlandia University in Hancock, Michigan from 2018 to 2021.

== Coaching career ==
=== Finlandia ===
Wiltzius was named interim head coach of Finlandia in April 2018. The interim label was removed on November 12, 2018.

== Head coaching record ==
Year	Team	Overall	Conference	Standing	Bowl/playoffs
Finlandia Lions (Michigan Intercollegiate Athletic Association) (2018–2021)
2018	Finlandia	0–10	0–7	8th	
2019	Finlandia	0–10	0–7	8th	
2020–21	No team				
Finlandia:		0–20	0–14		
Total:		0–20			
