= Olivet Comets football =

- First season: 1884; 142 years ago
- Athletic director: Ryan Shockey
- Head coach: Erik Ieuter; 1st season, 1–9 (.100)
- Location: Olivet, Michigan
- Stadium: Cutler Athletic Complex (capacity: 2,200)
- NCAA division: Division III
- Conference: MIAA
- Colors: Red and white
- All-time record: 349–569–30 (.384)

National championships
- Claimed: 0

Conference championships
- 13* 12 (1895, 1901, 1906, 1907, 1909, 1911, 1913, 1914, 1974, 1991*, 2007, 2015, 2016); *Forfeited
- Website: Olivet Comets Athletics

The Olivet Comets football program represents University of Olivet in college football at the NCAA Division III level. Olivet has been a member of the Michigan Intercollegiate Athletic Association since its founding in 1888.

== Notable seasons ==
Year	Record	Coach	Points for	Points against	Description
1883	0-1	--	5	10	First season
1892	2-1	--	44	22	First victory; first winning 10season
1895	4-0	--	119	2	First MIAA championship (3-0)
1901	8-0	Henry Hall	165	34	Second MIAA championship (7-0)
1906	5-1-1	Burt E. Kennedy	69	40	MIAA champion (4-0-1)
1907	7-2	Burt E. Kennedy	285	96	MIAA champion (5-1)
1909	4-2-1	Henry Hall	116	85	MIAA champion (4-0)
1911	5-1	J. E. Mills	80	37	MIAA co-champion (4-0)
1913	3-3	Otto Carpell	88	56	MIAA champion (3-1)
1914	5-3	George Rider	11	58	MIAA co-champion (3-1)
1961	8-1	Stuart Parsell	163	69	Finished 2nd in MIAA
1967	8-1	Stuart Parsell	222	115	Finished 2nd in MIAA
1974	7-2	Doug Kay	203	96	MIAA champion (5-0) -- first championship in 60 years
2007	6-5	Dominic Livedoti	281	215	MIAA co-champion (6-1), lost to Central in first round of NCAA Division III playoffs
2015	9-1	Dan Pifer			MIAA champion (5-1)
2016	9-2	Dan Pifer			MIAA champion (6-0), lost to John Carroll in first round of NCAA Division III playoffs
2019	8-2	Dan Musielewicz			Tied for 2nd in MIAA
2021	7-3	Dan Musielewicz			Tied for 4th in MIAA (3-3)
