= University of Olivet =

Christian college in Olivet, Michigan, US

- Former name: Olivet College (1844–2023)
- Motto: Pro Christo et Humanitate
- Motto in English: For Christ and Humanity
- Type: Private college
- Established: 1844; 182 years ago
- Religious affiliation: United Church of Christ; National Association of Congregational Christian Churches
- Endowment: $18.8 million as of 2020
- President: Steven M. Corey
- Provost: Paul Burkhardt
- Academic staff: 47
- Undergraduates: 978 (as of winter 2020)
- Location: Olivet, Michigan, U.S. 42.4410°N 84.9228°W
- Campus: Rural, 56 acres (23 ha)
- Colors: Red and white
- Nickname: Comets
- Sporting affiliations: NCAA Division III, Michigan Intercollegiate Athletic Association
- Mascots: Clyde & Haley
- Website: uolivet.edu
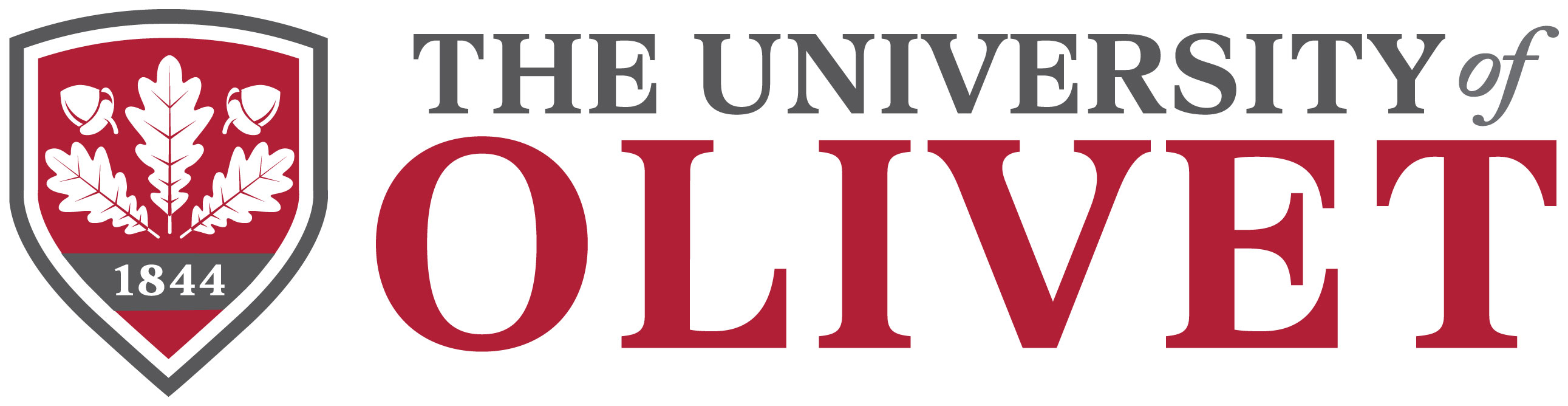

The University of Olivet, formerly known as Olivet College, is a private Christian college in Olivet, Michigan, United States. The college is accredited by the Higher Learning Commission. It was founded in 1844 by missionaries from Oberlin College, and it followed Oberlin in becoming the second coeducational college or university in the United States. The University of Olivet is affiliated with the United Church of Christ and the National Association of Congregational Christian Churches and stands in the Reformed tradition of Protestantism.

== History ==
In 1844, after founding Oberlin College, John Jay Shipherd and 39 missionaries, including Oberlin faculty, students, and alumni, came to Michigan to create a college, which Shipherd deemed "New Oberlin."

The original land for the college was to be in Grand River City, aka Delta Mills, in Delta Township, Eaton County, approximately twenty-eight miles (45 km) from where the college stands. Olivetian lore says that while Shipherd was on a trip to the site in Eaton County, his horse continued to get lost, and would always wander back to a hill with an oak grove, which is where Olivet's Campus Square exists today. Shipherd decided that powers from above must be drawing the horse back to this site, and Shipherd deemed that this would become the site for "New Oberlin." He then chose to name it Olivet, however, after the biblical Mount of Olives.

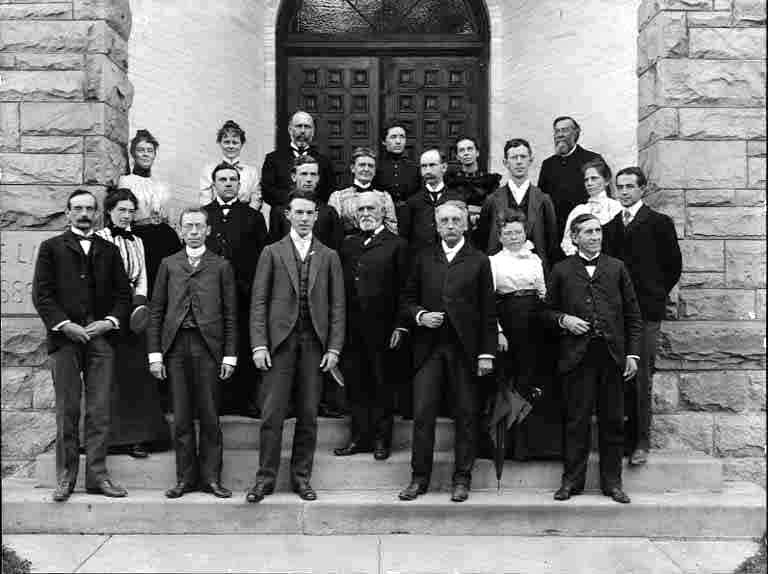
Thomas Franklin Kane and the faculty of Olivet College, Olivet, Michigan, circa 1898-1900s

The first courses began in December 1844. Because President Reuben Hatch's petition for a charter was denied, Olivet became the Olivet Institute, and remained a two-year school until chartered in 1859.

The 20th century saw Olivet College become a liberal arts school, with a short-lived attempt at an Oxford-style curriculum from 1934 to 1944.

A marker designating the college as a Michigan Historic Site was erected in 1960 by the Michigan Historical Commission. The inscription reads:

On February 24, 1844, the Reverend John J. "Father" Shipherd and thirty-nine followers arrived by ox-cart on this wilderness hilltop, driving their herds before them. They felt God had directed them to this oak grove for the purpose of founding a coeducational Christian college open to students of all races. First chartered as Olivet Institute, the school received its charter as a college in 1859. For over a century it has given a broad liberal arts education, with strong support from the Congregational church. Many alumni have gone forth "Pro Christo et Humanitate".

After assuming leadership in 2010, President Steven Corey announced the "Olivet College 2020 and Beyond Strategic Plan", which includes renovating existing buildings and facilities, creating a new student center, increasing endowment, and expand the student population to 1,500.

The board of trustees unanimously approved a change in the institution's name to University of Olivet in 2023.

== Academics ==
Academic rankings

Regional
- U.S. News & World Report: 48

Olivet offers 35 programs that lead to a bachelor's degree and a master's degree of Business Administration, Counseling, and Leadership. Its most popular undergraduate majors, in terms of 2021 graduates, were:

Criminal Justice/Safety Studies (19)
Psychology (18)
Business Administration & Management (15)
Insurance (14)
Registered Nursing/Registered Nurse (11)
Exercise Science & Kinesiology (10)

Olivet College has approximately 1,040 students, 40% female and 60% male. 74% of classes have less than 24 students, and there is a 16:1 student/faculty ratio. The college has a 59% retention rate for first to second year students.

== Student life ==
=== Greek life ===
The Soronian Society or Iota Kappa Omicron was founded at Olivet in 1847 and was the first women's literary society in the United States. Phi Alpha Pi was founded at the institution in 1861 and is the oldest active fraternity on campus. Alpha Lambda Epsilon is a coed society and literary society that was established on campus in 1922.

=== Olivet College radio ===
Olivet College has an FCC-licensed non-commercial educational student-run radio station, broadcasting in the Olivet area at 89.1 MHz FM with the callsign WOCR. The broadcast is also available for people outside the studio range online at. Students can volunteer for a radio shift from 7:30am to midnight Monday through Friday to broadcast music, campus events, news, and talk shows. Comet Football and Basketball is also often broadcast live from the game site.

== Campus ==
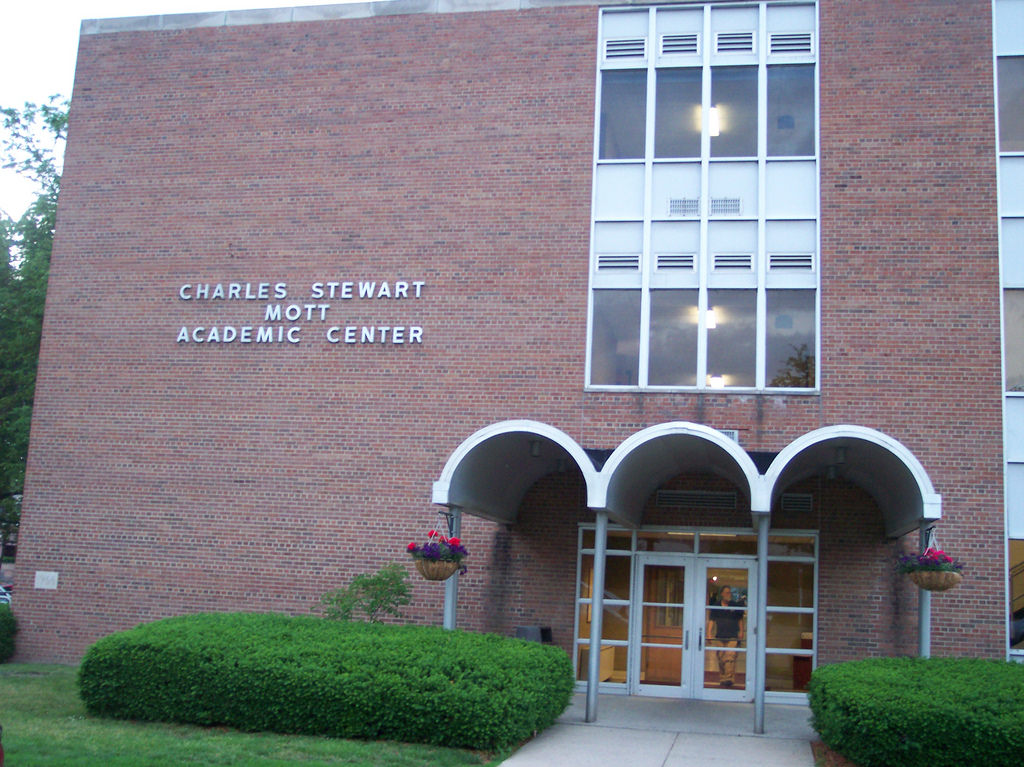
Charles Stewart Mott Academic Center, which is one of three buildings that houses the college's classrooms

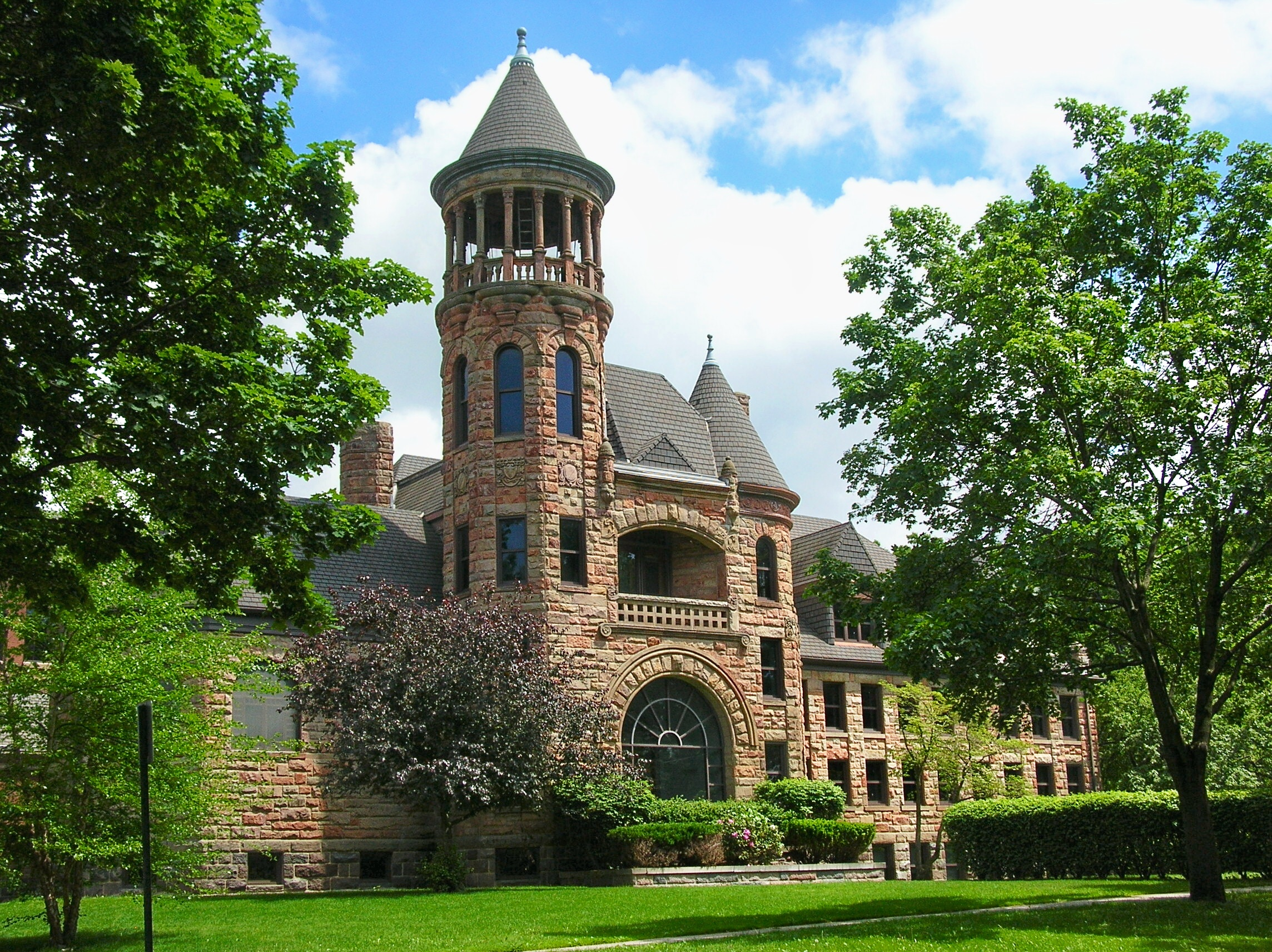
Olivet College Burrage Library

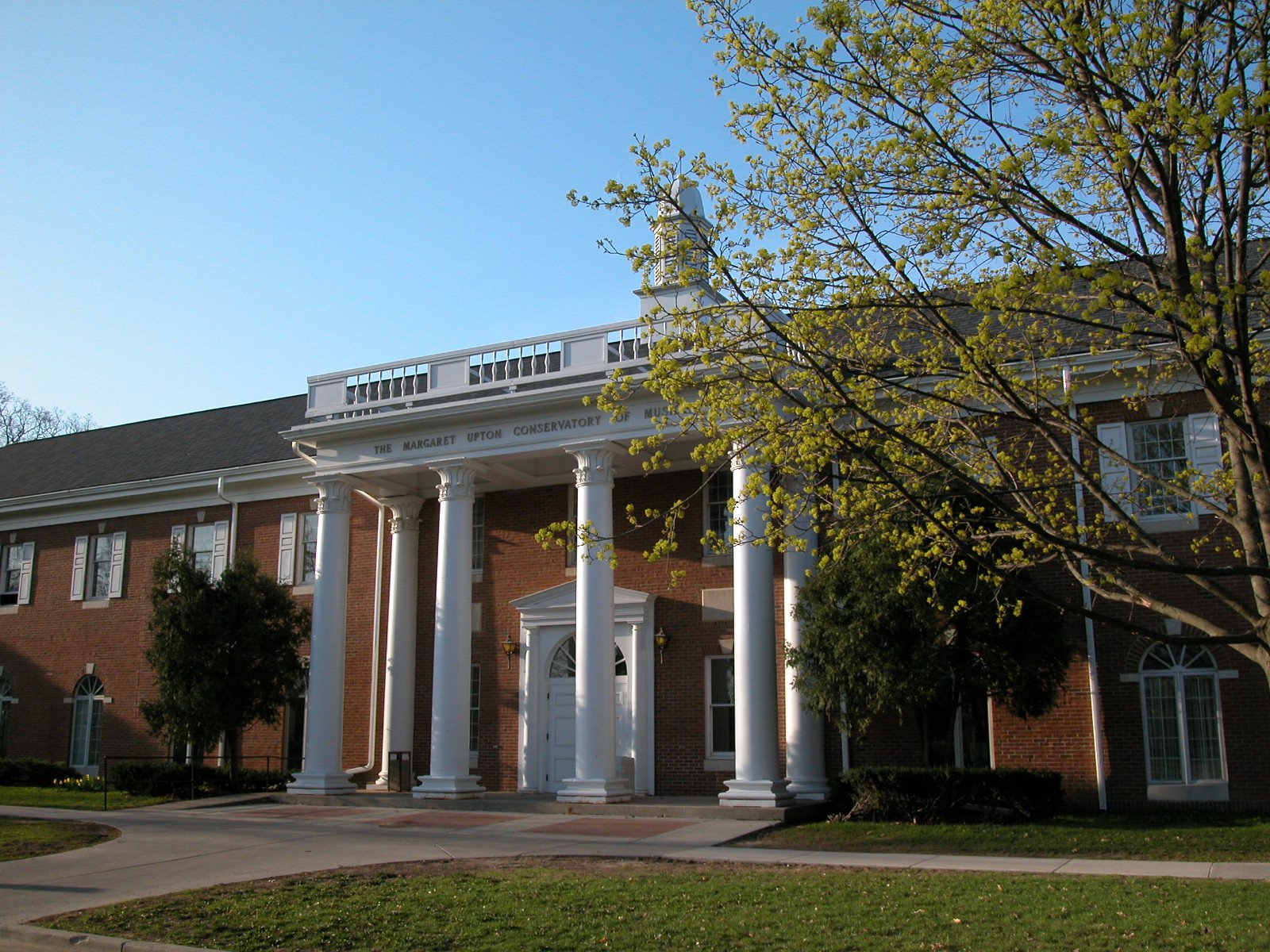
The Margaret Upton Conservatory of Music

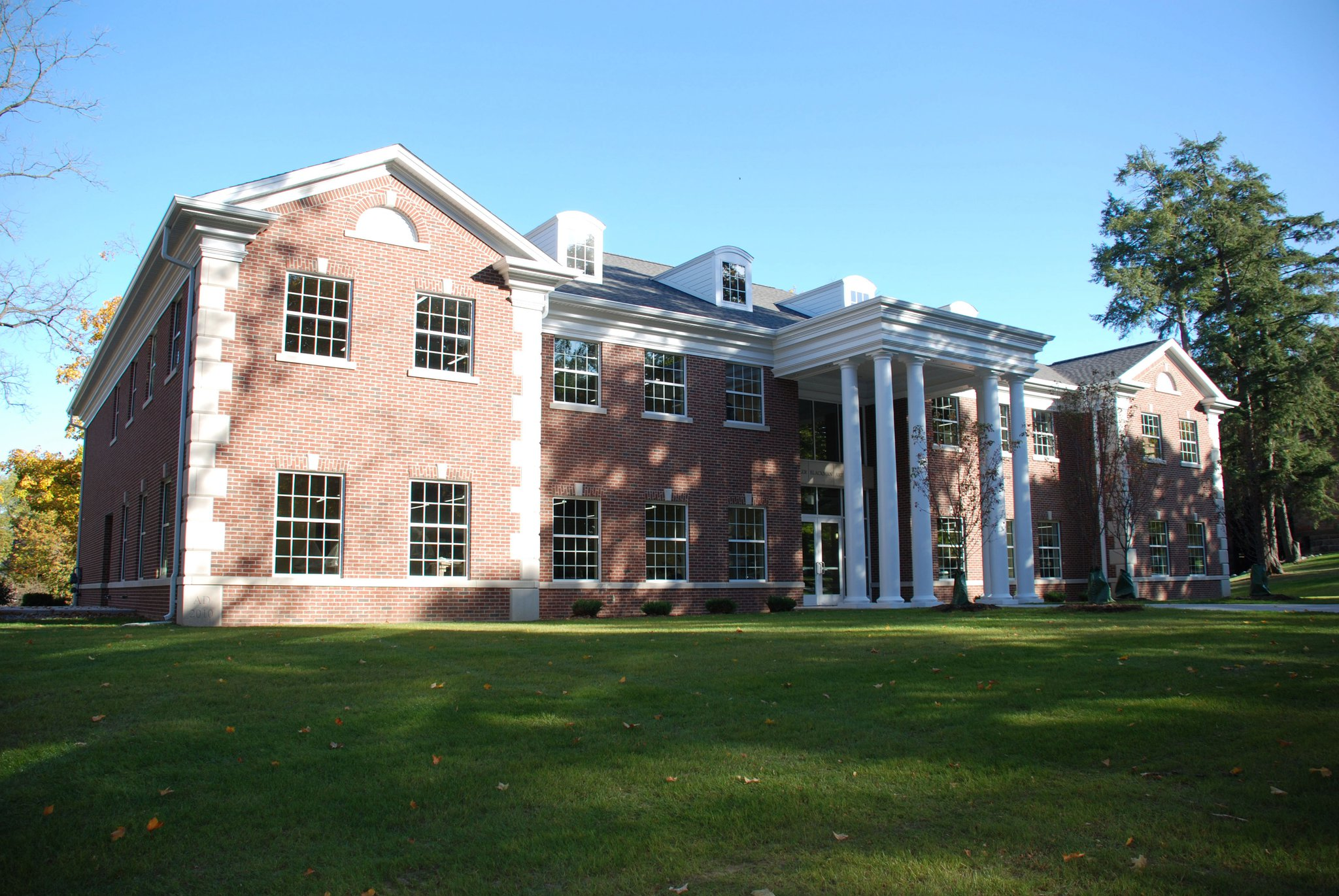
Riethmiller Blackman Art Building, which houses the college's art studios, exhibits, and classrooms

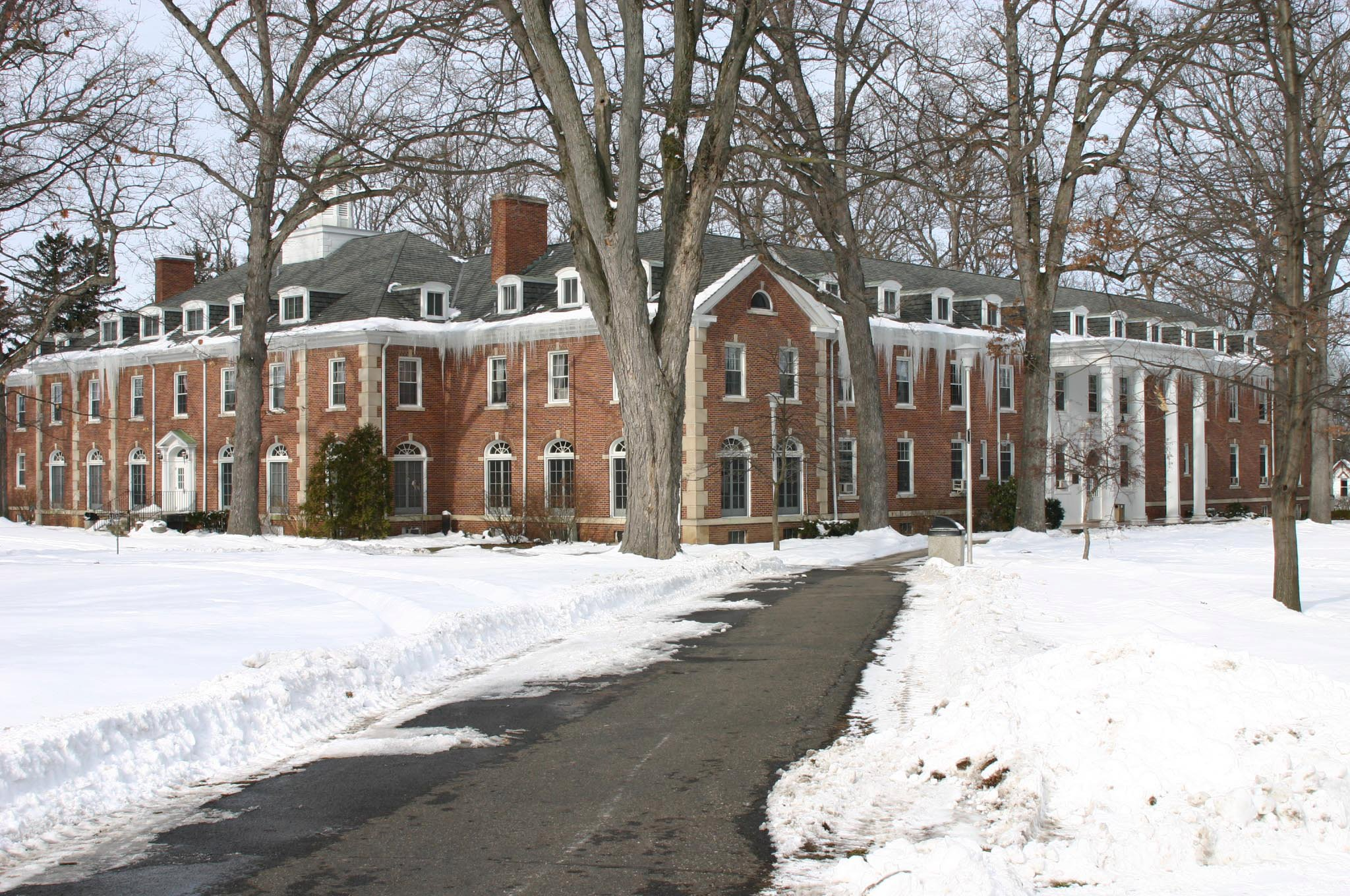
The college's admission office on the left wing of the building; Dole Residence Hall on the right wing

== Athletics ==
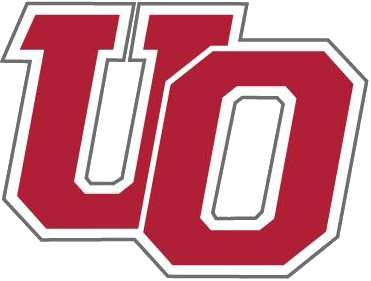
Olivet athletics logo

Along with Albion College and Michigan Agricultural College (now Michigan State University), Olivet founded the Michigan Intercollegiate Athletic Association (MIAA) in 1888. The MIAA is the nation's oldest collegiate conference.

Olivet College athletic teams, nicknamed the Comets, participate in the following intercollegiate sports as a member of the MIAA include:

Men's sports include baseball, basketball, bowling, cross country, football, golf, soccer, swimming & diving, tennis, track and field (indoor and outdoor), volleyball and wrestling. Volleyball became a full varsity sport in 2015–16 (2016 season), competing in the Midwest Collegiate Volleyball League.

Women's sports include basketball, bowling, cross country, golf, soccer, softball, swimming & diving, tennis, track and field (indoor and outdoor), volleyball, and cheerleading.

== Notable alumni ==
- Edith Vosburgh Alvord (1895), President of Twentieth Century Club of Detroit 1913, President Detroit Federation of Women's Clubs 1914
- John Henry Barrows (1867), fifth President of Oberlin College
- Hamilton King (1878), United States Minister to Siam (Thailand) from 1898 to 1912
- Augusta Jane Chapin, 2010 inductee into Michigan Women's Hall of Fame
- Adeola Fayehun (2007), Nigerian journalist
- Daron Cruickshank, current mixed martial artist competing in the UFC's Lightweight Division
- Dave Cutler (1965), software engineer, designer and developer of operating systems including Windows NT at Microsoft and RSX-11M, VMS and VAXELN at Digital Equipment Corporation
- W. Mont Ferry, Utah State Senator and the mayor of Salt Lake City.
- Mary E. Green (ca. 1858), physician
- James C. Harrison (did not graduate), artist
- James McCloughan (1968), Recipient of the Medal of Honor in 2017
- Wolfgang Mieder, educator
- Joseph S. Murphy (1955), President of Queens College, President of Bennington College, and Chancellor of the City University of New York
- George Pyne III (1965) football player
- John Ray (1950), football player and coach
- Sugar Chile Robinson, child musical prodigy
- Vern Ruhle (1975), MLB pitcher and coach
- Claressa Shields, Olympic boxing gold medalist
- Scott Sigler, author of science-fiction and horror, podcaster
- John Swainson, 42nd Governor of Michigan
- Ralph Thacker (1909), college football coach
- Robie Macauley (did not graduate), editor, novelist and critic whose literary career spanned more than 50 years
- Justin Jaynes, current mixed martial artist competing in UFC Featherweight division.

== Notable faculty ==
- Sherwood Anderson, creative writing
- George Whitefield Chadwick, composer
- Hubert Lyman Clark, zoology
- Amos Dresser, abolitionist and pacifist minister, one of the founders
- Ford Madox Ford, creative writing
- Alfred Korzybski, semantics
- Golo Mann, history
- Gertrude Stein, guest lecturer, creative writing

== See also ==
- Soronian
