= National Register of Historic Places listings in Eaton County, Michigan =

The following is a list of Registered Historic Places in Eaton County, Michigan.
This National Park Service list is complete through NPS recent listings posted April 24, 2026.

	Name on the Register	Image	Date listed	Location	City or town	Description
1	Bellevue Mill	Bellevue Mill	March 4, 1975 (#75000942)	218 E. Mill St. 42°26′46″N 85°01′00″W	Bellevue	
2	Charlotte Central Historic District	Charlotte Central Historic District	October 16, 2020 (#100002684)	Cochran Ave. & adjacent streets; West McClure St. to south of Henry St. 42°33′44″N 84°50′09″W	Charlotte	
3	Eaton County Courthouse	Eaton County Courthouse	April 2, 1971 (#71000389)	W. Lawrence Ave. at Cochran and Bostwick Sts.; also 100 W. Lawrence and 120 N. Bostwick; 42°33′52″N 84°50′12″W	Charlotte	Second set of boundaries represents a boundary increase of August 2, 1993. Now used as a museum.
4	First Congregational Church	First Congregational Church	September 3, 1971 (#71000390)	341 S. Main St. 42°37′45″N 85°01′31″W	Vermontville	
5	First Congregational Church	First Congregational Church	August 26, 1993 (#93000872)	106 S. Bostwick St. 42°33′49″N 84°50′16″W	Charlotte	
6	Grand Ledge Chair Company Plant	Grand Ledge Chair Company Plant	November 3, 1987 (#87001377)	101 Perry St. 42°45′25″N 84°45′18″W	Grand Ledge	
7	Hance House	Hance House	August 21, 1972 (#72000609)	217 Yale St. 42°26′23″N 84°55′19″W	Olivet	
8	Island City Historic District	Island City Historic District	August 28, 2012 (#12000557)	N. & S. Main, E. & W. Hamlin, E. & W. Knight, King, Hall, & Spicer Sts. 42°30′39″N 84°39′23″W	Eaton Rapids	
9	Michigan Central Railroad Charlotte Depot	Michigan Central Railroad Charlotte Depot	March 15, 2000 (#00000218)	430 N. Cochran Ave. 42°34′07″N 84°50′09″W	Charlotte	
10	Powers Highway-Battle Creek Bridge	Powers Highway-Battle Creek Bridge	January 7, 2000 (#99001653)	Powers Highway over Battle Creek; 42°27′16″N 84°48′24″W	Brookfield Township	
11	Residential Drive-Townline Brook Bridge		January 7, 2000 (#99001652)	Residential Drive over Townline Bridge; 42°28′39″N 84°57′11″W	Walton Township	
12	Isaac N. Reynolds House	Isaac N. Reynolds House	July 18, 1974 (#74000983)	123 N. East St. 42°30′49″N 84°39′04″W	Eaton Rapids	
13	River Ledge Historic District	River Ledge Historic District	September 24, 1987 (#87001576)	Jefferson, Scott, and Lincoln Sts. between Franklin and Maple Sts. 42°45′07″N 84°44′49″W	Grand Ledge	
14	Sunfield Grand Army of the Republic Post No. 283 Hall	Sunfield Grand Army of the Republic Post No. 283 Hall	October 29, 1992 (#92001502)	115 Main St. 42°45′44″N 84°59′41″W	Sunfield	
15	Vermontville Chapel and Academy	Vermontville Chapel and Academy	August 7, 1972 (#72000610)	N. Main St. 42°37′48″N 85°01′31″W	Vermontville	
16	Vermontville Opera House	Vermontville Opera House	July 14, 1993 (#93000620)	120 E. 1st St. and 219 S. Main St. 42°37′37″N 85°01′28″W	Vermontville	

== Former listing ==
	Name on the Register	Image	Date listed	Date removed	Location	City or town	Description
1	9622nd Army Air Corps Reserve Recovery Unit-Civil Air Patrol Quonset Huts	9622nd Army Air Corps Reserve Recovery Unit-Civil Air Patrol Quonset Huts	August 16, 1991 (#91001017)	April 18, 1988	16601 Airport Rd. 42°46′31″N 84°36′09″W	Lansing	

== See also ==
- List of Michigan State Historic Sites in Eaton County, Michigan
- List of National Historic Landmarks in Michigan
- National Register of Historic Places listings in Michigan
- Listings in neighboring counties: Barry, Calhoun, Clinton, Ingham, Ionia, Jackson
