= List of Michigan State Historic Sites in Eaton County =

Location of Eaton County in Michigan

The following is a list of Michigan State Historic Sites in Eaton County, Michigan. Sites marked with a dagger (†) are also listed on the National Register of Historic Places in Eaton County, Michigan.

== Current listings ==
Name	Image	Location	City	Listing date
1845 Eaton County Courthouse		1305 South Cochran Avenue	Charlotte	February 15, 1990
Anderson House Informational Site		101 South Main Street	Eaton Rapids	November 14, 1974
Bellevue Municipal Building		201 North Main Street	Bellevue	October 21, 1975
William U. Benedict House		125 West Main Street	Vermontville	November 1, 1988
Austin Blair Homesite Informational Site		248 South Main Street	Eaton Rapids	February 15, 1984
Blake's Opera House		121 South Bridge Street	Grand Ledge	September 14, 1995
Dwight I. Brackett House		715 West Capital Avenue	Bellevue	January 8, 1981
Burrage Library		333 South Main Street	Olivet	December 14, 1976
Center Eaton United Methodist Church		2093 Narrow Lake Road	Charlotte	January 22, 1987
Henry Clements House		5600 West Mt. Hope Highway	Delta Township	June 15, 1979
Delta Center Methodist Church Informational Designation		7533 West St. Joe Highway	Delta Township	October 27, 1983
Delta Mills Grange No. 370 Hall		Delta River Drive at Webster Street	Delta Township	June 20, 1985
Delta Mills Informational Designation		Delta Mills Park, 7001 Old River Trail	Delta Mills	April 14, 1972
Delta Mills School Informational Site		6816 Delta River Drive	Delta Township	March 22, 1983
Delta Township Informational Designation		7710 West Saginaw Highway	Delta Township	September 26, 1987
Luren D. Dickinson Informational Designation		1375 Brookfield Road	Delta Township	2006
Dyer Lime Kiln		Sand Road, south of M-78	Bellevue	March 2, 1976
Eaton County Courthouse†		100 West Lawrence Avenue	Charlotte	April 16, 1958
First Congregational Church†		106 South Bostwick	Charlotte	February 11, 1972
First Congregational Church†		341 South Main Street at West Main	Vermontville	June 27, 1969
First Congregational Church		125 College Street	Olivet	April 30, 1994
First Presbyterian Church, Dimondale		162 North Bridge Street	Dimondale	April 4, 1975
Governor Frank Fitzgerald House		219 West Jefferson Street	Grand Ledge	December 21, 1978
Gothic Mill†		218 East Mill Street	Bellevue	November 15, 1973
Grand Ledge Chair Company Plant†		101 Perry Street	Grand Ledge	April 20, 1989
Grand Ledge Clay Products(Demolished)		3621 West Jefferson	Grand Ledge	July 21, 1988
Grand Trunk Western Railroad Depot		210 South Main Street	Bellevue	January 13, 1982
Gresham United Methodist Church		5055 Mulliken Road	Chester Township	January 21, 1988
John R. Hall House		532 West Capital Avenue	Bellevue	January 11, 1982
Joseph and Mary Hall House		320 West Harris Street	Charlotte	January 20, 2000
Hamlin Township District No. 15 School		10248 Kinneville Road	Eaton Rapids	December 20, 1990
Hance House†		217 Yale Street	Olivet	December 10, 1971
Hollenbeck-Butler House		234 East Capital	Bellevue	August 24, 1978
Henry A. Hunsiker House		123 Parkway	Bellevue	January 8, 1981
Island Park		Middle of the Grand River, Downtown Eaton Rapids	Eaton Rapids	July 26, 1974
Lawrence Avenue Methodist Episcopal Church		210 East Lawrence Avenue	Charlotte	2006
Main Street Historic District		100-217 North Main Street	Bellevue	October 2, 1980
Michigan Central Railroad Charlotte Depot†		430 Cochran Avenue	Charlotte	August 26, 1999
Miller Dairy Farm No. 1		635 E. State	Eaton Rapids	January 26, 2007
Darius Moon Log House		Part of the Woldumar Nature Center, 5739 Old Lansing Road	Delta Township	January 8, 1981
Olivet College Informational Designation		Burrage Library, NE corner of College Avenue and Main Street	Olivet	March 19, 1958
Parma and Sheridan No. 7 School (also called Wright School; originally located at 2388 Eaton Rapids Rd in Albion)		635 State Rd	Eaton Rapids	August 12, 1983
Phi Alpha Pi House		Cottage and Main Streets	Olivet	May 17, 1973
Potterville Methodist Episcopal Church		105 North Church Street	Potterville	February 28, 1986
Red Ribbon Hall		314 South Main Street	Eaton Rapids	November 14, 1974
Irving and Janet Reuter House		677 South Michigan Road	Eaton Rapids	May 16, 1991
Reynolds-Horner House		107 King Street	Eaton Rapids	May 17, 1995
Fitzgerald Park		West Jefferson Street	Grand Ledge	April 4, 1978
Henry L. Robinson House		423 North Main Street	Bellevue	March 15, 1990
Seven Islands Resort Informational Designation		Second Island, the Grand River	Grand Ledge	April 4, 1978
Sperry Hall		232 Cottage Street	Olivet	May 17, 1978
Sunfield Grand Army of the Republic Post No. 283 Hall†		115 Main Street	Sunfield	September 10, 1979
John T. Sweezey House		702 South Main Street	Eaton Rapids	May 17, 1978
Underhill Store		106 East Jefferson Street	Dimondale	September 7, 1973
Vermontville Chapel and Academy†		North Main and East Main streets	Vermontville	June 27, 1969
Vermontville Methodist Episcopal Church		108 North Main Street	Vermontville	February 26, 1985
Vermontville Opera House†		219 South Main Street/120 East First Street	Vermontville	January 16, 1976
Hiram P. Webster House		114 South River Street	Eaton Rapids	June 15, 1979

== See also ==
- National Register of Historic Places listings in Eaton County, Michigan

== Sources ==
- Historic Sites Online – Eaton County. Michigan State Housing Developmental Authority. Accessed January 22, 2011.
