= Phi Alpha Pi =

Society fraternity at Olivet College in Michigan, US

- ΦΑΠ
- Founded: March 20, 1861; 165 years ago Olivet College
- Type: Social
- Affiliation: Independent
- Status: Active
- Emphasis: Literary
- Scope: Local
- Motto: "Progress, Truth, Friendship"
- Colors: Royal blue and White
- Chapters: 1
- Nickname: Phi Alphs, Napples, The Gentlemen
- Headquarters: 504 S. Main Street; Olivet, Michigan 49076; United States
- Website: www.uolivet.edu/greek-life/phi-alpha-pi/

Phi Alpha Pi (ΦΑΠ) is a local fraternity at the University of Olivet in Olivet, Michigan. It was established as a literary society in 1847 and became a traditional social fraternity in 1861. It is the oldest social and literary fraternity at Olivet College and the oldest in the State of Michigan.

== History ==
The fraternity originated as Olivet Lyceum literary society at Olivet College (now the University of Olivet) in 1847. Its name changed to Philalethian in 1850. The group was reorganized and became Phi Alpha Pi Society on March 20, 1861. Its founders were E. E. Benedict, G. W. Barney, S. F. Drury, George W. Keyes, N. J. Morrison, J. J. Scovel, S. F. White. Morrison served as its first president. Other original officers included Barney as vice president, Scovel as treasurer, Keyes as recording secretary, Drury as corresponding secretary, White as critic, and Benedict as librarian. Meetings were held in the Chapel Recitation room on campus.

The society hosted weekly literary sessions that were open to the public. It held an annual exercise on December 3, 1873, that featured music, oratory, readings, and debate. Phi Alpha Pi's members participated in Inter-Collegiate Society Oratorial Association's competitions in 1875. It won Michigan's first inter-fraternity oratoritorical contest in 1877. The society also competed with the Aldephic and the Soronian Societies from Olivet College.

In 1887, the literary society changed its constitution to become a "secret fraternity". However, it continued to host weekly literary sessions that were open to the public. In September 1892, it changed its name from Phi Alpha Pi Society to Phi Alpha Pi Fraternity. By May 1896, the Phi Alpha Pi annual reception was one of the top of the Olivet College social life.

In December 1912, Phi Alpha Pi held its 51st annual public debates, with 24 students participating in the preliminary debates. Students from Olivet competed with debaters from Alma College, Ferris Institute, Hillsdale College, and Hope College.

== Symbols ==
The motto of Phi Alpha Pi is "Progress, Truth, Friendship." This is the English translation of Φιλία, Αλήθεια, Πρόοδος (originally arranged as "Friendship, Truth, Progress") giving the Greek letter name of ΦΑΠ to the fraternity.

The fraternity's colors are royal blue and white. Its nicknames are Phi Alphs, Napples, and The Gentlemen.

== Chapter house ==
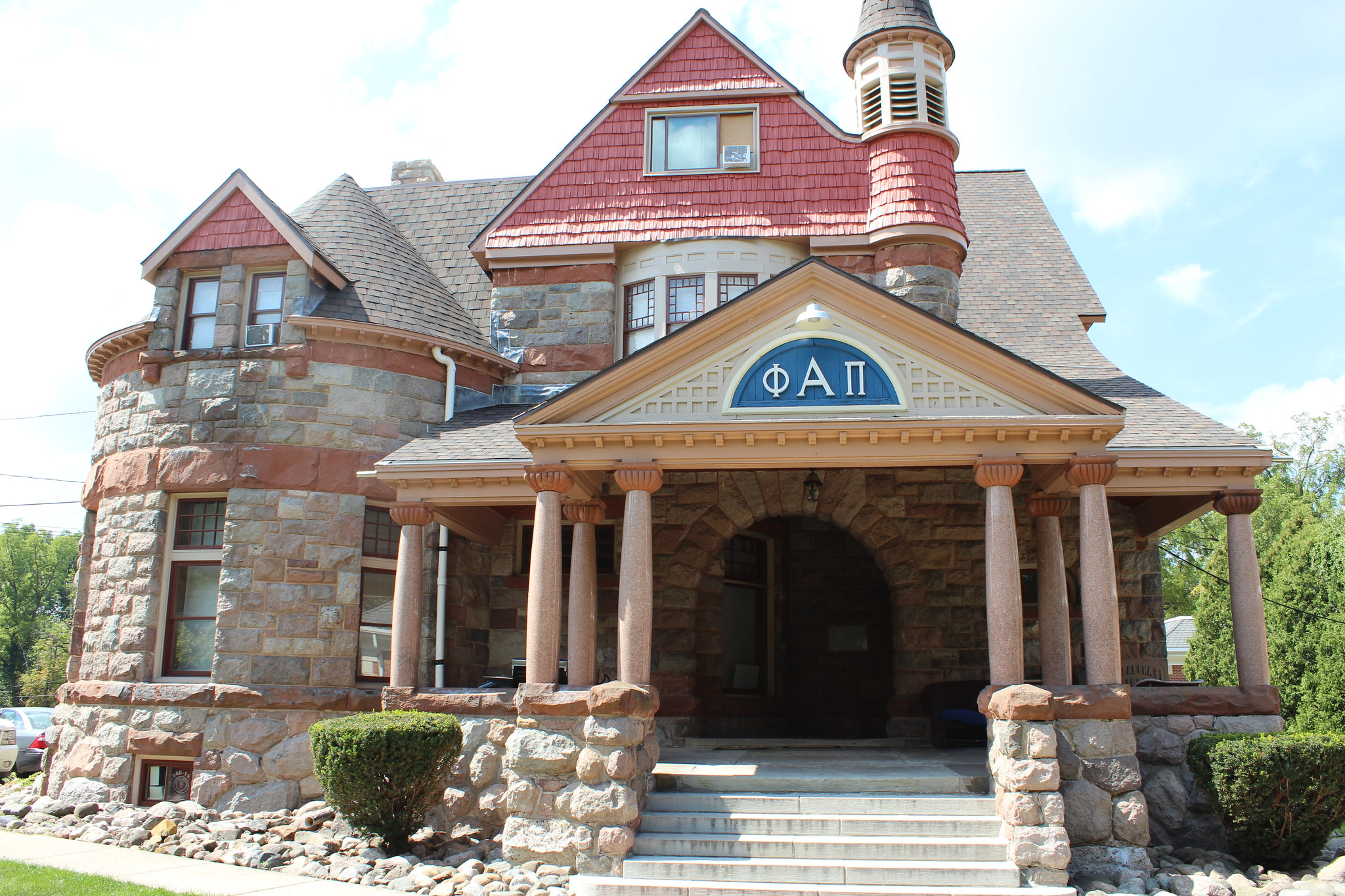
Phi Alpha Pi chapter house

When Parson's Hall was constructed, the fraternity leased rooms on the building's fourth floor. The group spent $2,000 upfitting their rooms with butternut and black walnut wood.

The group laid the cornerstone of a chapter house on June 15, 1890, during the college's commencement week. It was dedicated during commencement week on June 17, 1892. The chapter house is constructed of Lake Superior sandstone in Greek-Swiss or colonial style. It features a portico with eight red granite columns and a roof of red Spanish tiles. Its first floor includes an auditorium, cloakroom, committee room, library, reception hall, and parlor. The auditorium seats several hundred people. Its second floor includes committee rooms, a dining hall, dressing rooms, a janitor's apartment, a kitchen, a pantry, and apartments for twenty members. The chapter house cost around $24,000 to build ($860,000 in today's money). I. C. Seely of Minneapolis was the major donor to the project; a tablet with his name and class year was placed at the house's entrance.

The chapter house was listed on the Michigan Register of Historic Places. On November 2, 1978, the house was destroyed by a fire; forty firefighters fought the blaze for seven hours. The fire was caused by faulty wiring. The only part of the historic structure that was undamaged was the portico and columns, stone walls, and chimney. WIthin two weeks of the fire, the fraternity announced that it planned to restore the damaged chapter house. However, the insurance company only paid $200,000 of the $500,000 needed to restore the structure. Part of the house was occupied in 1981. By November 1985, the exterior restoration was completed, along with most of the interior.

The house was damaged by arson on April 9, 1989. The fire destroyed the third floor and roof; the second and first floors had water damage.

The house is located on 504 S. Main Street on the Olivet campus.

== Philanthropy ==
The fraternity hosts an annual Christmas party for underprivileged children.

== Scandals and controversies ==
- In 1973, the college announced plans to build a new conservatory after receiving a one million dollar gift; the chosen site included the property of the fraternity and its chapter house. The fraternity started a campaign and petitions to save their house. However, the college's board of trustees voted to relocate the conservatory and save the fraternity's house from demolition.
- In April 1989, an arsonist set fire to the Phi Alpha Pi chapter house hours after placing four phone calls, saying "The house will burn". Four students and a firefighter were injured and there was $200,000 in damages ($519,463 in today's money) to the house that had just been restored from an electrical fire. Three Olivet students admitted to making three prank calls did not make the fourth call that included the threat of fire.
- In 1992, eight or nine members of Phi Alpha Pi were involved in a campus brawl between white and black students. The incident started when a white female student called the fraternity house, asking for help because she was being threatened by several black male students who were outside of her room. Around seventy students were involved in the fight.
- In February 2003, police uncovered a hazing incident at the Phi Alpha Pi house; the fraternity was already on probation with the college for prior incidents.

== Notable members ==
- Hamilton King, Minister Resident/Consul General to Siam and Envoy Extraordinary and Minister Plenipotentiary to Siam (1898-1903)
- Alexander Tison, lawyer and professor at Columbia University Law School

== See also ==
- List of social fraternities and sororities
- List of Michigan State Historic Sites in Eaton County
- Soronian Society
