= Hance House =

Hance House may refer to:

- Hance House (Olivet, Michigan)
- Hance House and Barn, East Bradford Township, Pennsylvania
- Hill–Hance House, Chestnut Hill, Tennessee
