= River Ledge Historic District =

- U.S. National Register of Historic Places
- U.S. Historic district
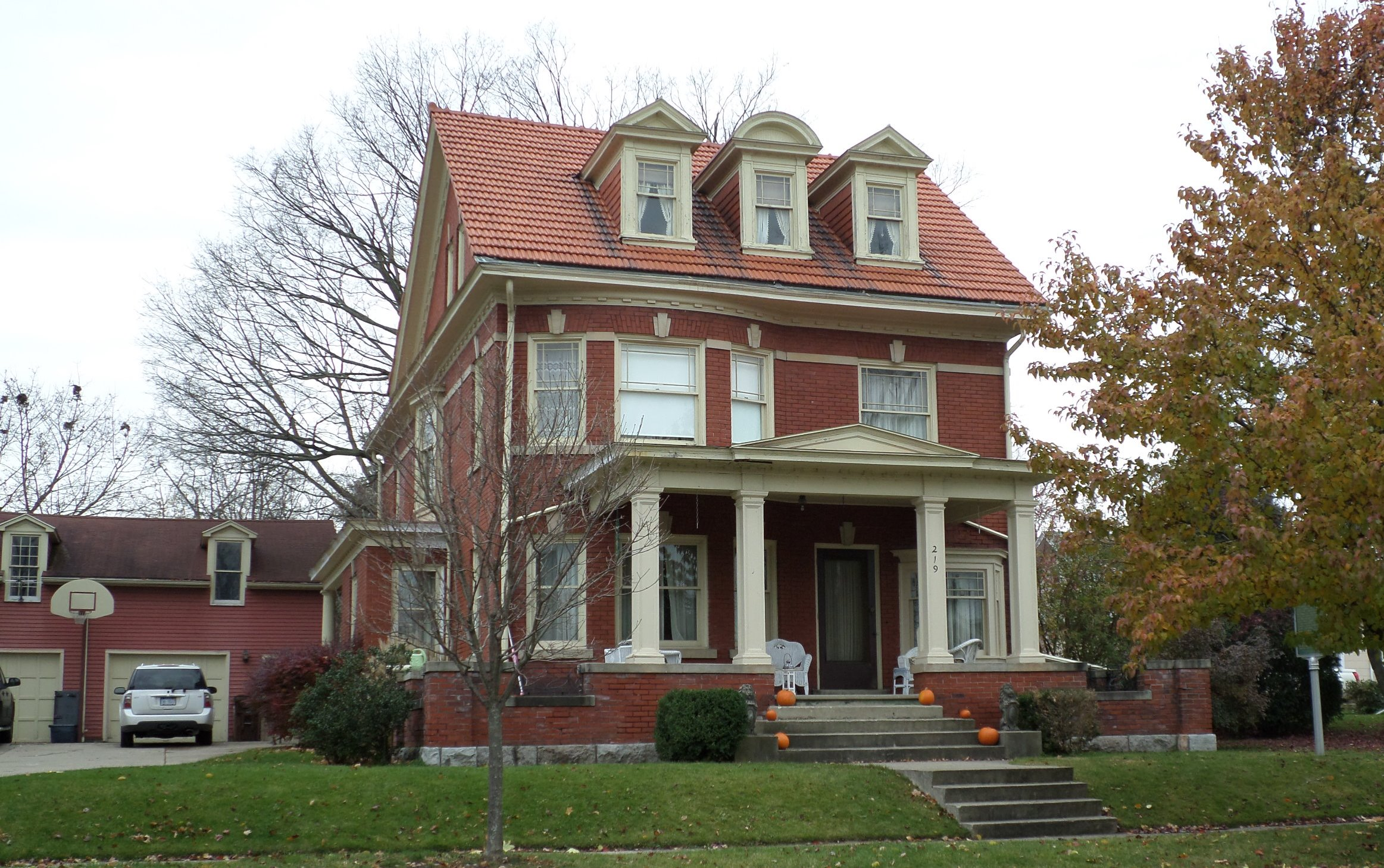
- Frank Fitzgerald House

- Location within Michigan Location within the United States
- Interactive map
- Location: Jefferson, Scott, and Lincoln Sts. between Franklin and Maple Sts., Grand Ledge, Michigan
- Coordinates: 42°45′7″N 84°44′49″W
- Area: 80 acres (32 ha)
- Architectural style: Colonial Revival, Late Victorian
- NRHP reference No.: 87001576
- Added to NRHP: September 24, 1987

The River Ledge Historic District is a primarily residential historic district located along Jefferson, Scott, and Lincoln Streets between Franklin and Maple Streets in Grand Ledge, Michigan. It was listed on the National Register of Historic Places in 1987.

== History ==
The Grand Ledge area was first settled in the 1840s. In 1849, a dam and sawmill were constructed across the Grand River at the site, and in 1850 the first commercial establishment in the town opened. In 1853, the first portion of the new settlement was platted; by 1860 about 225 people lived in Grand Ledge. It was about this time that development in the River Ledge Historic District began, as Jefferson became one of the most prestigious streets to live on. In 1869, the Ionia and Lansing Railroad was constructed through Grand Ledge, bringing a trade catering to visitors, as well as a new manufacturing base, to Grand Ledge. Along with the new prosperity came accelerated development in the district, as well-to-do local businessmen and manufacturers began constructing houses.

Some of the earliest residents of the district include Edmund Lamson, the founder of Grand Ledge and the first village president; Frank D. Fitzgerald, Governor of Michigan from 1936 to 1939; Edward A. Turnbull, owner of the Grand Ledge Chair Company; hardware dealers Hillard J. Babcock and Sylvester B. Granger; grocer George Coryell; building contractor Elmer Edwards; and doctors Abraham DeGroff and Andrew G. Stanka.

Gtowth in the district continued to accelerate through the nineteenth century, with the period of most growth occurring between about 1895 and 1920. Development began to slow then, with the last historically significant structure in the district, the public library, constructed in 1931.

== Description ==
The River Ledge Historic District contains 282 buildings, of which 235 contribute to the historic nature of the district. All but eight of the buildings were constructed as housing, and nearly all of the houses are single family residences. The structures in the district date from the 1850s to the 1920s, and include a broad range of architectural styles, including Greek Revival and Gothic Revival, Italianate, Queen Anne, Colonial Revival, and Bungalow/craftsman. The district contains the hares of many prominent citizens of early Grand Ledge, as well as several historic civic and church buildings.

Some of the significant structures in the district include:

- Summers House (520 E. Jefferson): Builtin 1874, this house has paired-bracket eaves, and is one of the best examples of Italianate architecture in the neighborhood.
- Edmund Lamson House (405-407 W. Jefferson): An L-shaped, upright-and-wing-type house, with Gothic-arch-head windows.
- Sheets-Fitzgerald House (219 W. Jefferson): Built in 1907 and designed by Lansing architect Edwin A. Bowd, this Colonial Revival house has triangular and segmental-arch pedimented dormers, keystones over the windows, and a paneled-pilaster front porch.
- First Baptist Church (now Church of Christ) (205 W. Scott): Built in 1874, this church is a brick, Gothic structure with a 1931 tower addition at the corner.
- First United Methodist Church (411 Harrison): Built in 1911 on the same site as its 1874 predecessor church, this building is a brick Gothic structure.
- Trinity Episcopal Church (201 E. Jefferson): Built in 1911/13, this church is a brick, Gothic structure with corner tower.
- Free Methodist Church (now First United Methodist Church annex) (406 S. Bridge): Build about 1900, this is a stucco-clad structure with a corner tower.
- Public library (131 E. Jefferson): The Ladies Library Association first began advocating for a library building in 1911; this structure was finally constructed in 1931. It is a red-brick, Renaissance Revival-style structure with a green tile roof, and a large rear wing added in 1958.
