= Homer G. Barber =

American politician

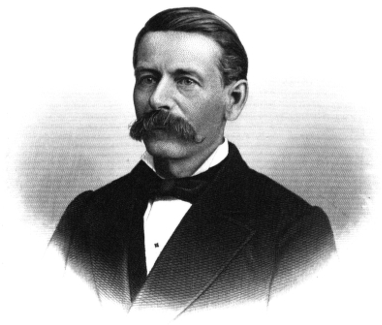

Member of the Michigan Senate from the 20th district
- In office January 4, 1871 – December 31, 1872
- Preceded by: George Thomas
- Succeeded by: Mark S. Brewer

Personal details
- Born: November 25, 1830 Benson, Vermont
- Died: March 10, 1909 (aged 78) Vermontville, Michigan
- Party: Republican
- Spouses: Lucy Clarissa Dwight (m. 1853; d. 1893); Gertrude E. Wood (m. 1894)
- Education: Vermontville Academy

Homer Griswold Barber (November 25, 1830 – March 10, 1909) was an American politician from Michigan.

== Early life ==
Homer G. Barber was born on November 25, 1830, in Benson, Vermont, to parents Edward Hinman Barber and Rebecca Barber. In 1839, Homer moved with his parents to Vermontville, Michigan. His parents were among the original colonists of Vermontville, and he grew up on their farm there. There, he was educated at the Vermontville Academy.

== Career ==
Around 1849, Barber served as a clerk for the postmaster in Kalamazoo. A year after this, in 1850, Barber went to California for the gold rush. He sailed to California, going under Cape Horn on the route. Barber mined in California for two years before returning to Vermontville. Barber used the profit from this endeavor to start a successful career as a merchant. In 1861, Barber was appointed the Postmaster of Vermontville, a position he held for eleven years. On November 4, 1870, Barber was elected to the Michigan Senate, where he represented the 20th district from January 4, 1871, to December 31, 1872. In 1872, Barber engaged in banking, establishing his own private village bank. From 1872 to 1873, Barber served as trustee of Vermontville. In 1874, Barber served as village president of Vermontville. Barber served again as village president of Vermontville from 1876 to 1879. Barber served as a Vermontville school board trustee in 1880.

== Personal life ==
On March 23, 1853, Barber married Lucy Clarissa Dwight. Together, they had three children. Barber also adopted one daughter. Barber was widowed upon Lucy's death on May 1, 1893. On April 7, 1894, Barber remarried to Gertrude E. Wood. Barber was a Congregationalist, and was said to have a "liberal views on religion." Barber was a Freemason.

== Death ==
In February 1909, Barber contracted influenza, which lead to his deteriorating health. Barber died on March 10, 1909. He was interred at Woodlawn Cemetery in Vermontville on March 12.
