= James J. Gould =

American politician

Member of the Michigan House of Representatives from the Eaton County 2nd district
- In office January 3, 1877 – December 31, 1878
- Preceded by: George Huggett
- Succeeded by: Orsamus S. Barnes

Personal details
- Born: September 1, 1823 Hector, New York, US
- Died: March 1, 1909 (aged 85) Kalamo Township, Michigan, US
- Party: Republican

James J. Gould (September 1, 1823 – March 1, 1909) was a Michigan politician.

== Early life ==
Gould was born on September 1, 1823, in Hector, New York. James received a public school education. In 1854, James moved to Reading Township, Michigan.

== Career ==
In 1859, Gould served as the treasurer of Reading Township. In 1866, Gould moved to Kalamo Township, Michigan. In Kalamo, he worked as a farmer. In 1873, Gould served as justice of the peace in Kalamo alongside Joseph Gridley. On November 7, 1876, Gould was elected to the Michigan House of Representatives, where he represented the Eaton County 2nd district from January 3, 1877, to December 31, 1878.

== Personal life ==
Gould was married to Adelia Fletcher. On February 28, 1890, Adelia died. In 1891, Gould remarried to Sarah J. Gridley. Sarah died on December 21, 1898.

Gould died on March 1, 1909, in Kalamo.
