= Duane Hawkins =

American politician

Member of the Michigan House of Representatives from the Eaton County 2nd district
- In office January 5, 1881 – December 31, 1882
- Preceded by: Orsamus S. Barnes
- Succeeded by: Luman Shepard

Personal details
- Born: February 17, 1840 Vermontville, Michigan, US
- Died: November 29, 1899 (aged 59) Vermontville, Michigan, US
- Party: Republican

Military service
- Allegiance: United States Army (Union Army)
- Years of service: 1864–1865
- Battles/wars: American Civil War

Duane Hawkins (February 17, 1840 – November 29, 1899) was a Michigan politician.

== Early life and education ==
Duane Hawkins was born on February 17, 1840, in Vermontville, Michigan. His parents, Jay and Lodice Hawkins, moved there from Vermont in 1838. He received a public school education.

== Military career ==
On August 30, 1864, Hawkins enlisted into the Union Army. He served in the 2nd Michigan Volunteer Cavalry Regiment. He was discharged on June 2, 1865.

== Career ==
Hawkins live on a farm for most of his life. On November 2, 1880, Hawkins was elected to the Michigan House of Representatives, where he represented the Eaton County 2nd district from January 5, 1881, to December 31, 1882. Hawkins was elected as a justice of the peace and served as the president of the Eaton County Agricultural Society.

== Personal life ==
Hawkins' first wife, Sarah E. Hallenbeck died on January 10, 1891. In 1892, Hawkins married Gertrude Schroder.

Hawkins was a Freemason who served as a Worshipful Master around 1880.

== Death ==
Hawkins died on November 29, 1899, in Vermontville.
