= Soronian Society =

Sorority at Olivet College in Michigan, US

- ΙΚΟ
- Founded: October 14, 1847; 178 years ago Olivet College
- Type: Social
- Affiliation: Independent
- Status: Active
- Scope: Local
- Motto: "Strong in Love, Firm in Right"
- Colors: Red and White
- Flower: Red Rose
- Chapters: 1
- Headquarters: 123 W. Cottage Street; Olivet, Michigan 49076; United States
- Website: soroniansociety.wixsite.com

The Soronian Society, also known as Iota Kappa Omicron (ΙΚΟ), is a local sorority at the University of Olivet in Olivet, Michigan. It began as the first women's literary society in the United States in 1847.

== History ==
The Young Ladies' Literary Society was started by seven Olivet College students on October 14, 1847, as a literary society. It was organized by Mrs. Oramel Hosford (who was the wife of Olivet professor Oramel Hosford). The society held monthly meetings that were open to the public and featured music and the reading of papers written by its members. It was the first women's literary society in the United States.

In its second year, both male and female students participated in the society but it soon separated into two groups. The Young Ladies' Literary Society declined and was reorganized as the Erodelphian Society in 1856. After a few years, the society became domant.

It was revived on January 26, 1868, under the suggestion of student Henrietta P. Dennis. A committee was established to draft a constitution for the new literary society; the constitution was adopted on May 6, 1865. Dennis served as the society's first president. The organization was renamed the Soronian Society with the Greek letters of Iota Kappa Omicron.

In the late 19th and early 20th centuries, the Soronian Society became known for its annual public exercises that featured its members performing music, literary presentations, and harmonic gymnastics. The society also held an annual prize declamatory contest in June. Other society activities included reunions for its alumnae. In 1897, members of the Soronian Society formed baseball clubs that played during the summer.

The sorority called both Soronian Society and Iota Kappa Omicron today. The fraternity Phi Alpha Pi is its brother society.

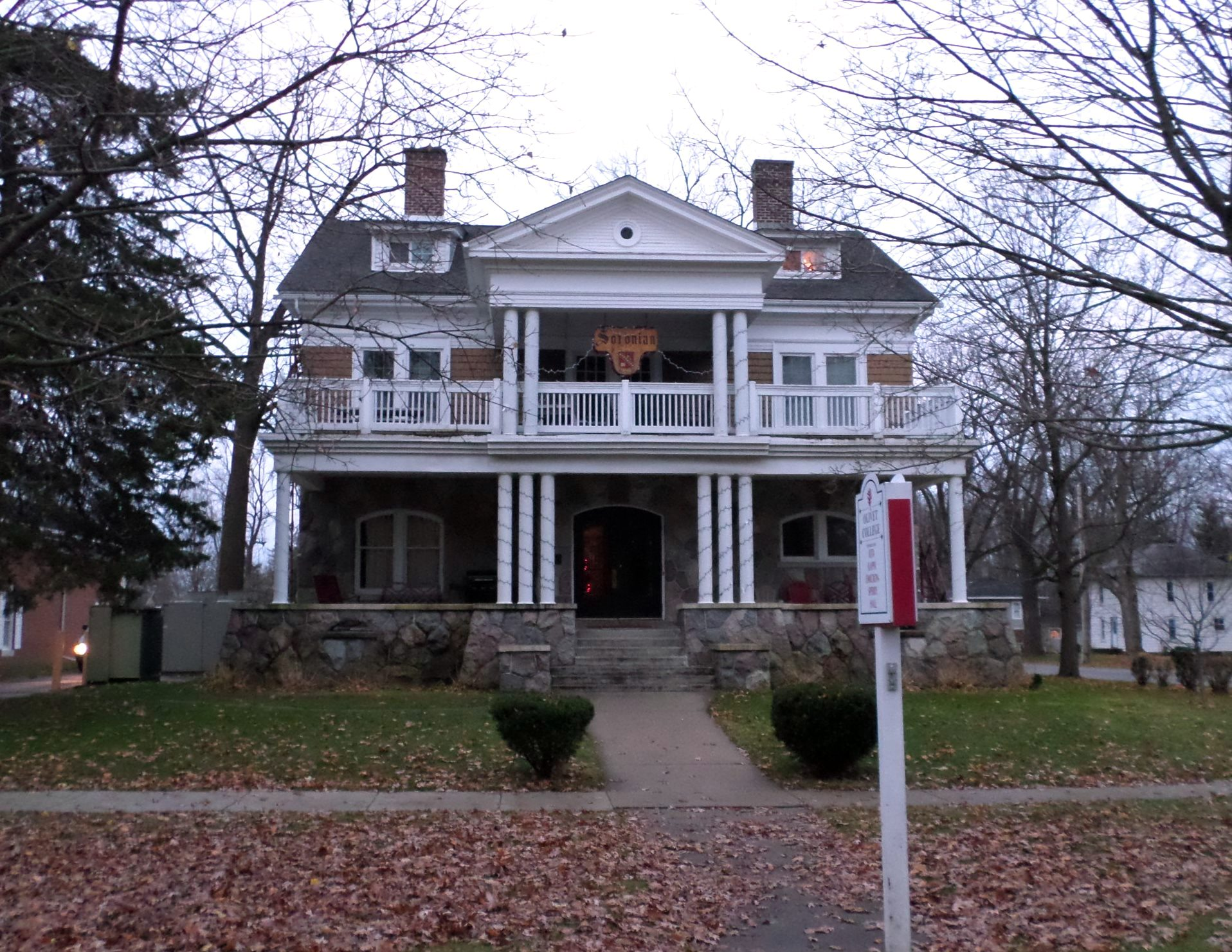
Sperry Hall

== Symbols ==
Professor John M. Barrows named the society; soror is Latin for sister. Soronian Society's motto is "Strong in Love, Firm in Right".

The society's colors are red and white. Its flower is the red rose. The society uses an Old English font "S" as its symbol.

== Chapter house ==
In June 1871, the Soronian Society moved into rooms on the fourth floor of Ladies Hall. The college trustees gave the society $315 toward furnishing this space. In 1882, Ladies Hall burned, and Soronian Society lost its library, furnishings, and records. The society was rehoused in Shiphard Hall, with a dedication taking place in June 1883. Phi Alpha Pi fraternity and the Aldephics donated funds, helping to raise $700 to furnish the society's new quarters.

In June 1901, the college trustees agreed to give the society land to construct a house, provided it could secure $2,500 in pledges toward construction. The new house was designed by Edwyn Bowd and built between 1905 and 1907. Its construction cost around $20,000 ($716,667 in today's money). It was named Sperry Hall for Williard G. Sperry, president of Olivet College (1893–1904) who contributed toward the house's construction.

Sperry Hall includes an audience hall, cloakroom, dining room, kitchen, parlor, sleeping rooms, and bathrooms. The exterior of the building has stained wood shingles and broad front porches across both it first and second stories. It has a foundation in Cyclopean masonry constructed from fieldstone. Sperry Hall is located at 123 W. Cottage Street in Olivet. It became a Michigan State Historic Site on May 17, 1978.

== Philanthropy ==
The members of Soronian Society raise funds for the University of Olivet Women's Board Scholarship. Other activities include co-hosting a Christmas party for underprivileged children with Phi Alpha Pi.

== Controversies ==
In September 1997, a fight involving twelve non-students broke out at a Soronian Society party. Six people were treated at the hospital for injuries, alcohol poisoning, and intoxication; one individual was comatose for two hours. A resident assistant who tried to break up the fight was also injured and treated at the hospital. As a result, Olivet toughened its policies on alcohol on campus.

== See also ==
- List of social fraternities and sororities
- List of Michigan State Historic Sites in Eaton County
