= Jennie Murray Kemp =

American temperance worker, editor (1858–1928)

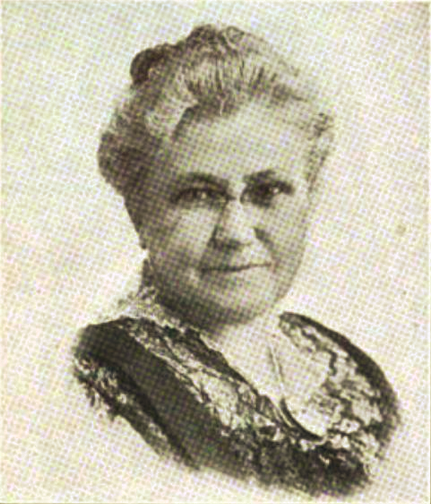
- Born: Orpha Jane Murray; June 25, 1858; Bellevue, Michigan, U.S.
- Died: April 15, 1928 (aged 69); San Francisco, California, U.S.
- Occupations: temperance leader; writer; newspaper circulator
- Organizations: Woman's Christian Temperance Union; United States Food Administration
- Spouse: Robert Nathaniel Kemp (m. 1880; died 1919)
- Awards: Degree of Honor, Ancient Order of United Workmen

Orpha Jane "Jennie" Murray Kemp (née, Murray; 1858–1928) was an American temperance movement leader, writer, and newspaper circulator, nationally known for her work with the Woman's Christian Temperance Union (WCTU), and for her Food Administration campaigning during World War I. For 50 years, Kemp was an active WCTU worker. She campaigned vigorously through California and Oregon in the interests of prohibition. She served as president of the Oregon WCTU and later as secretary of the National WCTU. Kemp was editor and publisher of Our Messenger, 1889–1903; circulation manager of The Union Signal, and The Young Crusader, 1903–12; and National WCTU press superintendent since 1912.

== Early life and education ==
Orpha Jane (nickname, "Jennie") Murray was born in Bellevue, Michigan, on June 25, 1858.

She was educated in the public schools and at Baker University, Baldwin City, Kansas (B.S. 1877; A.M. 1909).

== Career ==
On June 23, 1880, she married Robert Nathaniel Kemp (1844–1919), of Cherokee, Kansas.

She took active part in the campaign of 1881 which put Prohibition into the Kansas State Constitution. She also joined the International Organisation of Good Templars in Kansas. Her membership in the WCTU dated back to her college days, when she served as secretary of the first local organization formed in her home town. After filling various local offices, she served successively as president of Crawford County, Kansas WCTU, and president of the Third Congressional District organization. During the seven years that she held the latter position, the membership grew to such proportions that it was called the "Mighty Third".

For three and a half years, she edited Our Messenger, organ of the Kansas WCTU. In 1903, she became circulation manager of The Union Signal and the Young Crusader, official papers of the National WCTU published at Evanston, Illinois. After nine years of this work, she took a year's rest in Grants Pass, Oregon, where, in 1914, she became campaign manager for the WCTU, and in that year, Constitutional Prohibition was carried in that State. In the same year, she was elected president of the Oregon WCTU, and retained that position until called by the Food Administration, in October 1917, to become a lecturer in its interest.

From February 1920, until November 1922, Kemp, as national organizer of the WCTU, was located in San Francisco. During the latter year, she served as secretary to the North California WCTU in its campaign for the Wright Law. A notable feature of this campaign was the organization of a committee of women in San Francisco, under whose auspices was arranged a "Women's March of Allegiance" of more than 1,800 white-clad women down Market Street, with banners bearing the slogan "We support the Constitution of the United States". The Wright Law was carried by an enormous majority, and was thus the first victory for Prohibition enforcement in California.

At the close of the campaign, Kemp was called to the headquarters of the National WCTU at Evanston, as director of field services.

== Personal life ==
The Kemps had four children: Harriet, James, Robert, and Charles.

Kemp favored woman suffrage. She was a member of the Methodist Episcopal Church, and was progressive in politics. Kemp was a member of the Illinois Woman's Press Association, and the Daughters of the American Revolution.

In 1924, after 50 years of active WCTU work, Kemp returned to San Francisco for rest, and lived with a son. During the last four years of her life, Kemp was ill, and was confined to her bed for a month before her death. She died in San Francisco on April 15, 1928, at the age of 69. Interment was in Cypress Lawn.

== Awards and honors ==
- Degree of Honor, Ancient Order of United Workmen
