= Orsamus S. Barnes =

American politician (1830–1916)

Member of the Michigan House of Representatives from the Eaton County 2nd district
- In office January 1, 1879 – December 31, 1880
- Preceded by: James J. Gould
- Succeeded by: Duane Hawkins

Personal details
- Born: August 7, 1830 Broome County, New York
- Died: March 17, 1916 (aged 85) Girard, Kansas
- Party: Republican

Military service
- Allegiance: United States Army
- Years of service: 1847–1848
- Battles/wars: Mexican-American War

Orsamus S. Barnes (August 7, 1830 – March 17, 1916) was a Michigan politician.

== Early life ==
Barnes was born on August 7, 1830, in Broome County, New York. In 1839, he moved to Oberlin, Ohio, due to the breaking up of his father's family. In Ohio, he lived with some siblings and other relatives and attended school for a year. In February 1846, he moved to Wisconsin.

== Military career ==
On August 16, 1847, Barnes enlisted in the United States Army in Milwaukee to fight in the Mexican–American War. He was a part of the 15th Infantry Regiment. Of the 136 men in his company, he was one of only 26 survivors. He returned to Wisconsin at the end of the war.

== Career and education ==
Barnes lived in Wisconsin for about seven more years. There, he attended common school, taught classes, and worked at wagon shops. In the spring of 1855, Barnes returned to Oberlin, and continued his education there. In 1860, Barnes moved to Lenawee County, Michigan. In 1863, he moved to Eaton County, Michigan. In Michigan, he was a farmer. He held nearly every type of township office, including supervisor and constable. Barnes was a Republican ever since the party formed. On November 5, 1878, Barnes was elected to the Michigan House of Representatives, where he represented the Eaton County 2nd district from January 1, 1879, to December 31, 1880.

== Personal life ==
During his second time in Oberlin, Barnes met Elvira L. Spooner. On February 19, 1857, Barnes and Spooner married in Oberlin. Together they had two children. Barnes was a Church of Christ minister.

== Death ==
Barnes died on March 17, 1916, in Girard, Kansas.
