= Vermontville Opera House =

- U.S. National Register of Historic Places
- Michigan State Historic Site
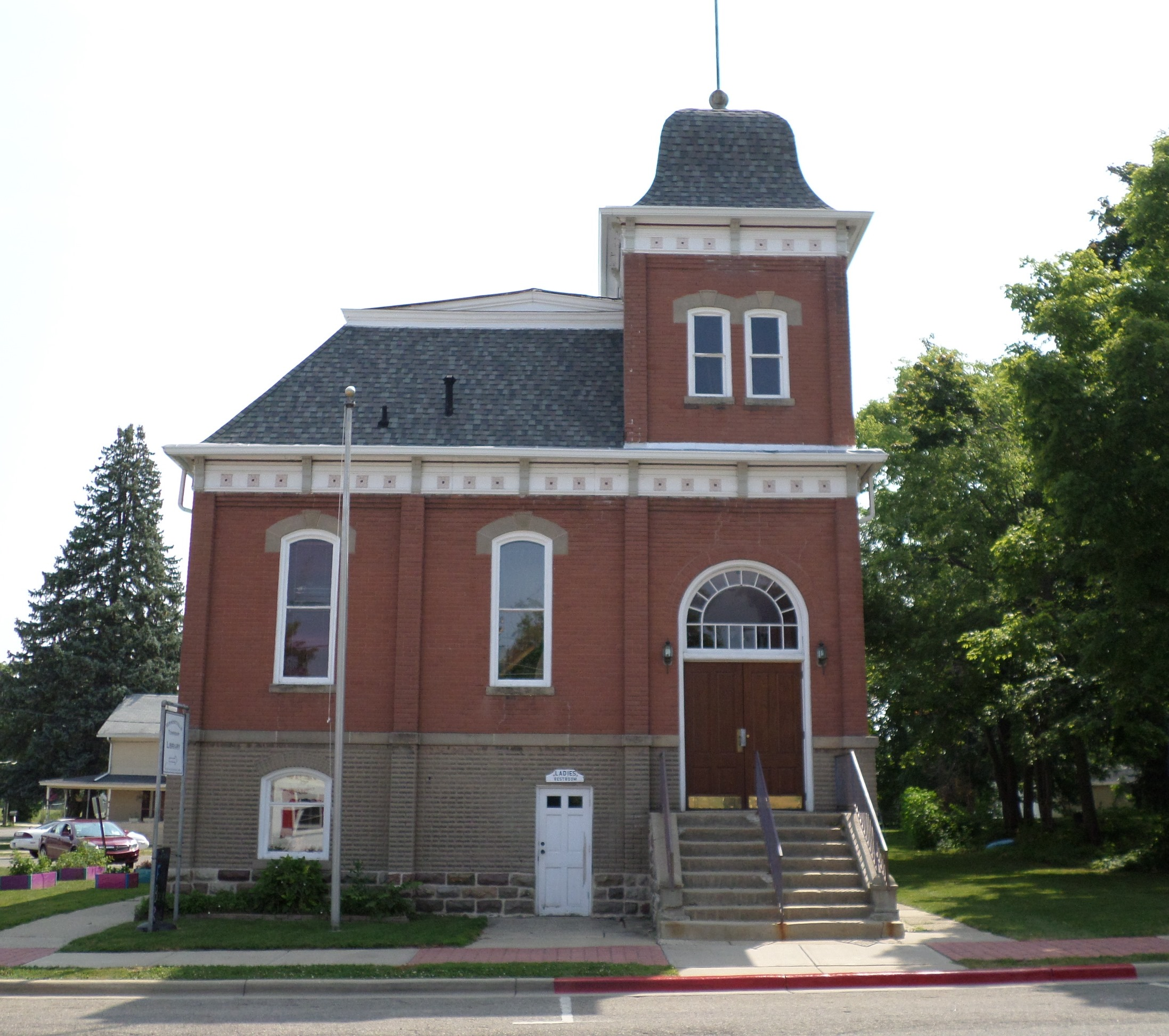

- Location within Michigan Location within the United States
- Interactive map
- Location: 120 E. First St., Vermontville, Michigan
- Coordinates: 42.62719°N 85.02449°W
- Area: less than one acre
- Built: 1895
- Built by: Rawson & Brown; John York
- Architectural style: Late Victorian
- NRHP reference No.: 93000620
- Added to NRHP: July 14, 1993

The Vermontville Opera House is an auditorium located at 120 East First Street in Vermontville, Michigan. It was listed on the National Register of Historic Places in 1993.

== History ==
Vermontville was first settled in 1836; it slowly developed, and in 1871 was incorporated into a village. At some point before 1881, an opera house was constructed in the village, and was owned by a succession of local residents until it burned in the mid-1890s. In 1895, the Vermontville Township purchased this plot of land and began construction of the opera house on the site, with the cornerstone laid on August 27. The building was completed in 1896.

The auditorium was well-used for dances, lectures, plays, musical performances, and vaudeville over the next several decades. The first story of the opera house originally housed office and meeting spaces for Vermontville Township and Village, along with the village's fire apparatus at the rear of the building. In 1948, the Vermontville Library took over the former village council rooms. In 1973, the fire department moved out and the library expanded; the building itself was renovated by infilling the former fire house doors. As of 2018, the building still housed both the library and the Township offices.

== Description ==
The Vermontville Opera House is a rectangular three-story structure with walls faced in concrete block in the first story and red brick above. The building has a mansard roof and a foundation of rock-face fieldstone ashlar. Window bays are separated by slightly projecting piers, which stretch upward to the cornice line. The windows have segmental arches and cut stone sills and caps with prominent keystones. The cornice is or pressed metal. A square tower at one corner has a bell-shaped roof and paired windows with store trim. On the main facade are two entrances: a single door in the center leading into the first story, and an entrance in the tower leading to the auditorium at the second floor level.

The building contains a first floor originally housing offices and the fire department, and now houses the library. The upper floors housing a level-floor auditorium with rear gallery. The auditorium is entered through a lobby, where a ticket office is also located. The auditorium itself is a two-story high space, flat in the center and sloping around the perimeter. A small stage is at the front, and a balcony at the rear above the lobby.
