= First Congregational Church (Vermontville, Michigan) =

Historic church in Michigan, United States

- U.S. National Register of Historic Places
- Michigan State Historic Site
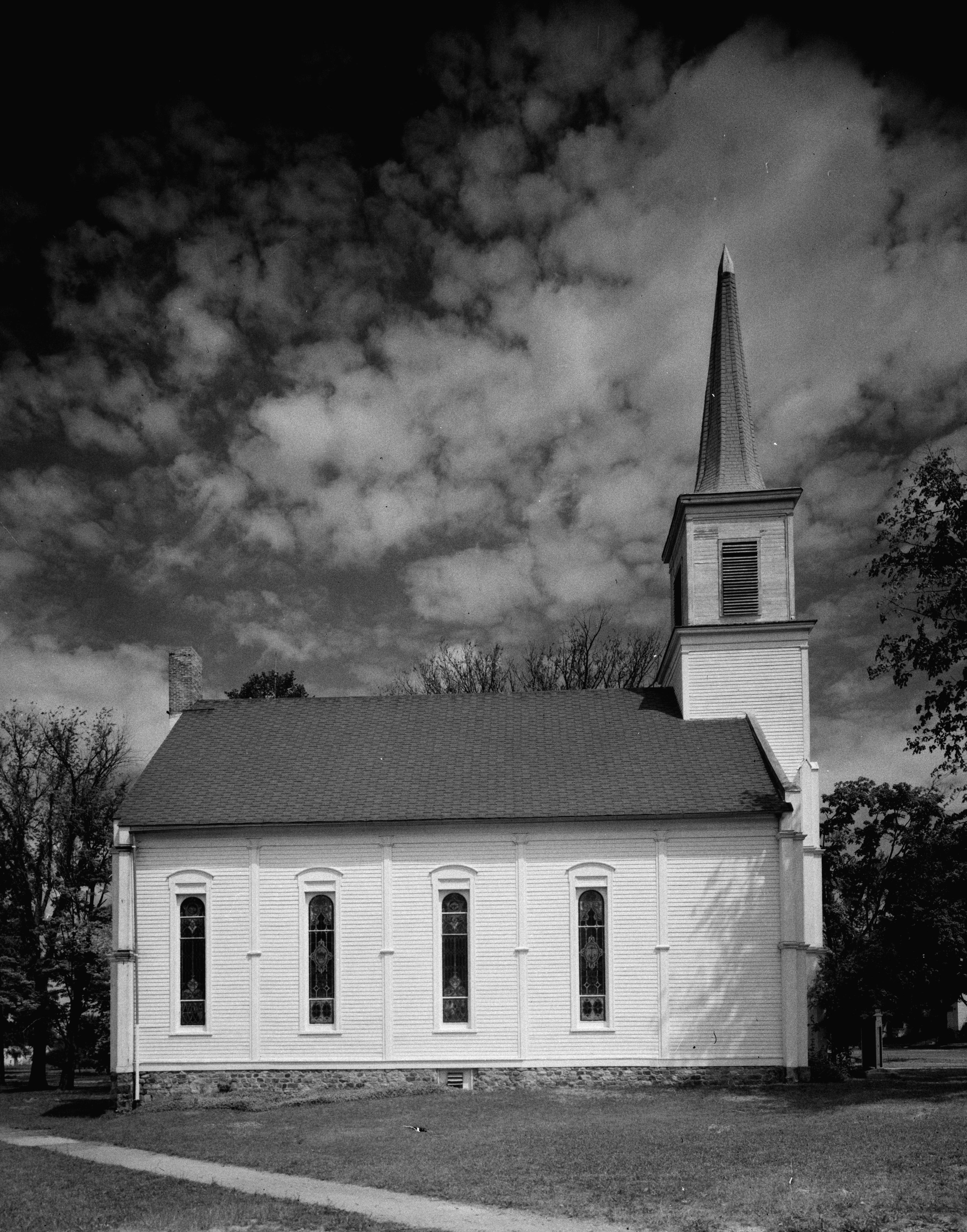

- Location within Michigan Location within the United States
- Interactive map
- Location: 110 S. Main St. Vermontville, Michigan
- Coordinates: 42°37′45″N 85°1′31″W
- Area: less than one acre
- Built: 1862
- NRHP reference No.: 71000390

Significant dates
- Added to NRHP: September 3, 1971
- Designated MSHS: June 27, 1969

The First Congregational Church is a historic church located at 110 S. Main Street in Vermontville, Michigan. It was built in 1862 and added to the National Register of Historic Places in 1971, and is part of the Historic American Buildings Survey.

== History ==
Vermontville was settled in the 1830s by a group from East Poultney, Vermont who were followers of the Congregational minister Sylvester Cochrane. Cochrane established the First Congregational Church of Vermontville in 1837, and served as its first pastor for five years. At first, the congregation held services in private homes, and then moved to a new log schoolhouse. In 1844 they built the two-story Vermontville Chapel and Academy to serve as both a church and an academy. In 1861, Rev. Orange H. Spoor came to the pastorate, and the congregation quickly grew. In 1862, the congregation began work on this building, for use by the church and society. Due to a dispute over wages, the church was not completed until 1864.

== Description ==
The First Congregational Church is a white rectangular, one-story building with a gable roof, corner buttresses, and a central square entrance tower topped with a belfry and an octagonal spire that reaches approximately 110 feet. It has a gable roof and sits on a rubble foundation. The church measures sixty feet six inches by forty feet. There is a double paneled entry door in the base of the tower. Two semi-circular arched windows in square heads are in the front of the church, and four windows are along each side of the building.

On the interior, the church has an entry vestibule leading to a rectangular auditorium with a gallery above. The pulpit is on a raised platform. Ten pews, likely original, line each side of the center aisle. The wood trim is painted light yellow, and the walls a light green; the same color predominates in the stained-glass windows. Ornamental sheet metal ceiling pieces were added in the late 19th century.
