= Vermontville Chapel and Academy =

- U.S. National Register of Historic Places
- Michigan State Historic Site
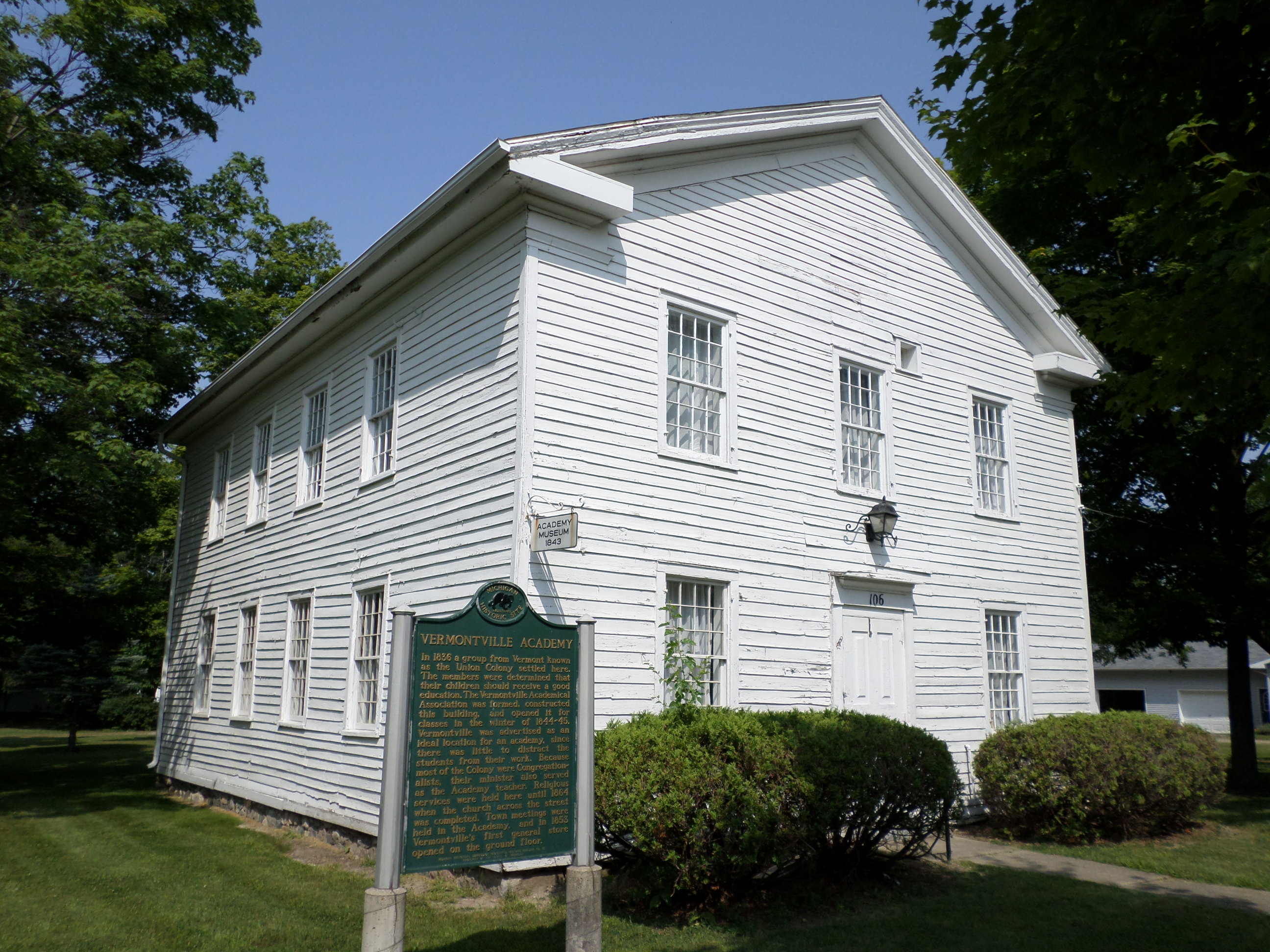
- The Vermontville Academy, August 2014

- Location within Michigan Location within the United States
- Interactive map
- Location: 106 N. Main St. Vermontville, Michigan
- Coordinates: 42°37′48″N 85°1′31″W
- Area: 0.5 acres (0.20 ha)
- Built: 1844
- NRHP reference No.: 72000610

Significant dates
- Added to NRHP: August 7, 1972
- Designated MSHS: June 27, 1969

The Vermontville Academy, also known as the First Congregational Chapel, is a building in Vermontville, Michigan, located at 106 North Main Street. It was listed on the National Register of Historic Places in 1972, and is part of the Historic American Buildings Survey. It now serves as the Vermontville Historical Museum.

== History ==
The town's early settlers, who came from Vermont and called themselves the Union Colony, arrived in the area in 1836. The first school classes were held in a private home in 1838, and later that year a log schoolhouse was erected. By 1843, the population of the village had grown enough that an association was formed to construct a building to serve the community as both an academy and a church. The society raised money by subscription, and the building and its upper academic floor was completed in 1844 at its original location, a short distance west of the present location. The Vermontville Academical Association operated the building as an academy and chapel. A general store opened on the first floor in 1853, and the structure also served as the town's meeting hall. The lower story was finished as a church in 1851, but religious services ceased in 1864 when a nearby Congregational church was constructed.

A few years later the academy and the district public schools were united into a Union School, which used the building for classes, In 1869, the district decided to construct a new brick schoolhouse, and the academy building was abandoned. A short while later, it was moved to its present location, and remodeled to use for prayer and social meetings on the first floor, and theatrical performances on the upper. The building was refurbished in the early 1900s, enlarging the kitchen and turning the upper floor into a dining room. In 1965, the Vermontville Historical Society was organized, and in 1966 received permission from the First Congregational Church, which still owned the building, to convert it into a museum. The building was officially opened to the public as a museum in 1967. The building was rehabilitated in the 1970s and 80s.

== Description ==
The Vermontville Academy is a rectangular two-story gable-roof structure clad with clapboards on a low foundation. It measures about 40 feet by 30 feet. The main entrance is on one end, and the windows are 12-over-12 double hung units. On the interior, each level has a vestibule, with the remainder of the space being an open auditorium.

== Notable alumni ==
- Homer G. Barber (1830–1909), Michigan state senator
