= Island City Historic District =

- U.S. National Register of Historic Places
- U.S. Historic district
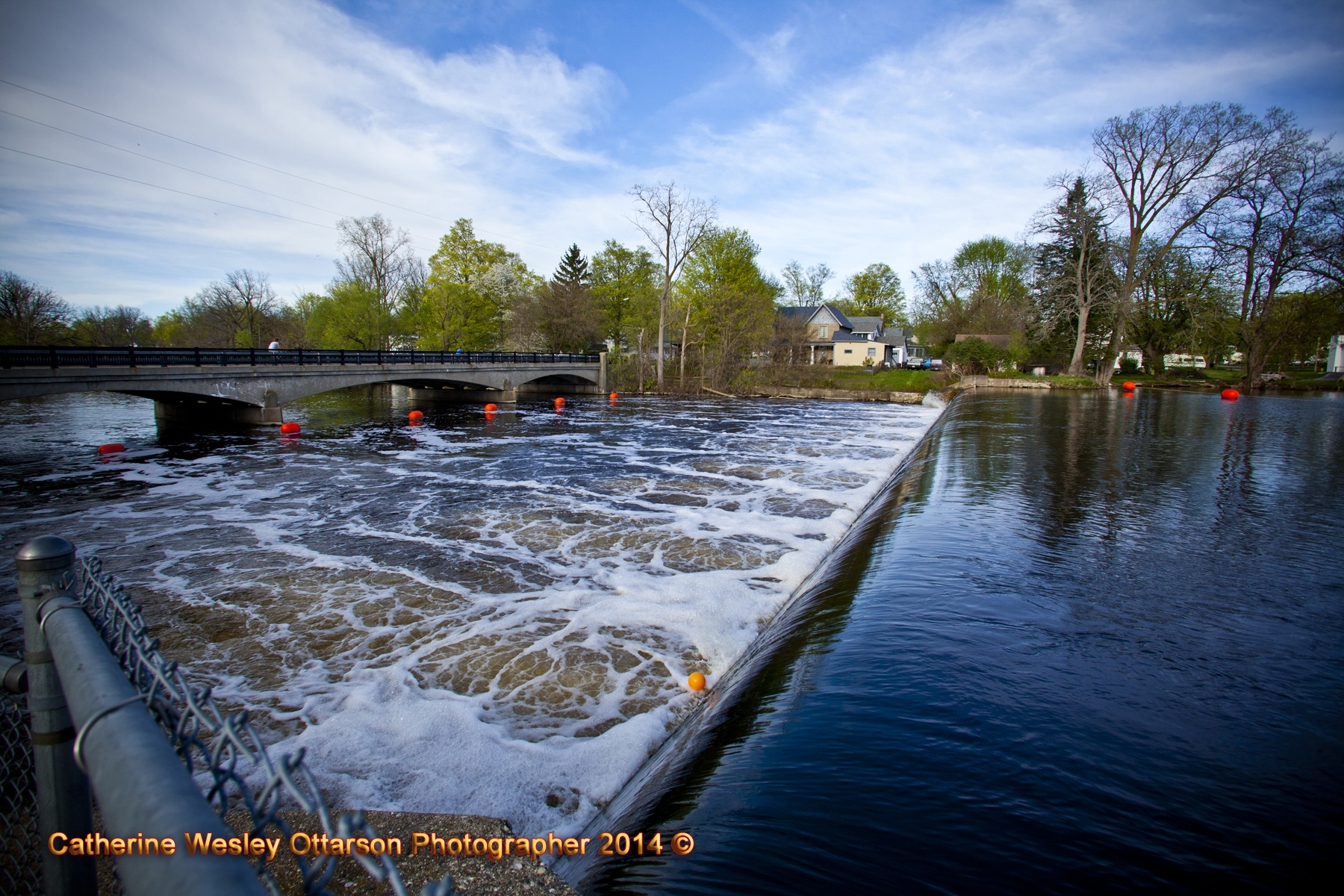
- State Street Dam looking downriver

- Location within Michigan Location within the United States
- Interactive map
- Location: N. & S. Main, E. & W. Hamlin, E. & W. Knight, King, Hall, & Spicer Sts., Eaton Rapids, Michigan
- Coordinates: 42°30′39″N 84°39′23″W
- Architectural style: Italianate, Gothic Revival, Romanesque Revival, Second Empire, Queen Anne
- NRHP reference No.: 12000557
- Added to NRHP: August 28, 2012

The Island City Historic District is a primarily commercial historic district which encompass the whole of the island on which stands the central part of Eaton Rapids, Michigan. It was listed on the National Register of Historic Places in 2012.

== History ==
The Eaton Rapids area was first settled in 1836, when a sawmill was built about two miles from what is now downtown Eaton Rapids. By 1836, a group of investors had built a dam on Spring Brook in Eaton Rapids, started work on a race, and built a grist mill. The village was first platted, and by 1837/38, houses had been built. In 1840 a considerably larger race was built, along with a sawmill and factory buildings. In 1842, the South Feeder Race that defines what is now the island was cut through. The settlement grew rapidly over the next forty years, spurred by the mills, surrounding agriculture, and the discovery of mineral springs in the area in the 1860s.

In fact, a number of mills and other industries were established along the Eaton Rapids races with in the district, starting in 1840. In 1880 Samuel Horner purchased an already existing woolen mill and brokered it into a very successful venture. He constructed a number of factory and mill buildings now located in the northern part of the district, and his companies flourished into the 1950s. As the mills expanded, so did the commercial ventures in Eaton Rapids. By the early 1860s, there were multiple grocers, shoe stores, hardware stores, and dry goods stores, as well as liveries, milliners, and other establishments. A fire in 1864 destroyed half of the buildings downtown, and major fires in 1874 and 1877 destroyed much of the rest. In response, in 1881 a Fireman's Hall was constructed to house the village's fire station.

== Description ==
The Island City Historic District contains 139 buildings, sites, structures and objects, of which 92 contribute to the historic character of the district. Most of these are buildings, but mill races, bridges, and parks also contribute to the historic nature of the area. The district encompasses Eaton Rapids' central business district, and is bounded by the Grand River and several mill races that create the island itself. Although the district is primarily commercial, some industrial, residential, and institutional structures are located within the boundaries. The streets in the district are generally in a grid, with wide sidewalks and buildings set back about 15 feet.

The primarily commercial buildings in the heart of the district are between one and four storefronts in width and one to three stories in height. At the northern section of the district are industrial buildings such as the former Homer Mill complex. At the southern end are the visually distinctive First Congregational Church soars alongside the Red Ribbon Hall, a significant cultural anchor of the community. The district also includes a post office, old residences, and school buildings. Architectural styles in the district range from Gothic Revival, and Second Empire structures to later Queen Anne, Romanesque Revival, Colonial Revival, and Neoclassical structures, to twentieth century Commercial Brick and Craftsman/Bungalow styles.

Significant structures in the district include:

- First Congregational Church (300 South Main Street): The First Congregational Church is a brick Gothic Revival structure constructed in 1877/78 to replace an earlier church that was destroyed by fire. It has a tall gable roof and spire-tipped octagonal corner tower topped with a belfry. The front facade is dominated by a single large Gothic window that rises up into the front gable; each side of the church contains three smaller pointed-arch windows. A red double-door entry is accessed by a set of steps.
- Red Ribbon Hall (314 South Main Street): Red Ribbon Hall is a large rectangular two-story building with a flat roof. It was constructed in 1878-79 by the Eaton Rapids Temperance Reform Club to serve as their meeting place and to host other public events. It became the city's Masonic Temple in 1924. It is constructed of light buff brick with red brick bands as accents.
- Michigan State Bank (149 South Main Street): This is a Queen Anne commercial style building constructed in 1886. The three-part front contains recessed, arch-head entries at each end and a store window in the center, separated by square iron piers. The second story has a shallow slant-sided bay window featuring round columns with decorative capitals. A massive metal cornice tops the building.
- Leonard Block (139-45 South Main): This building is a three-story Italianate commercial style building four storefronts wide, constructed in 1866. An upstairs entrance separating each pair of storefronts, and the upper stories have round-arch windows with raised brick caps with stone keystones.
- Horner Mill complex (224 North Main Street): This complex consists of six primary buildings; the first of which were built in 1890 ad 1909.
