= Lansing Civil Air Patrol Quonset Huts =

- 9622nd Army Air Corps Reserve Recovery Unit--Civil Air Patrol Quonset Huts
- Formerly listed on the U.S. National Register of Historic Places
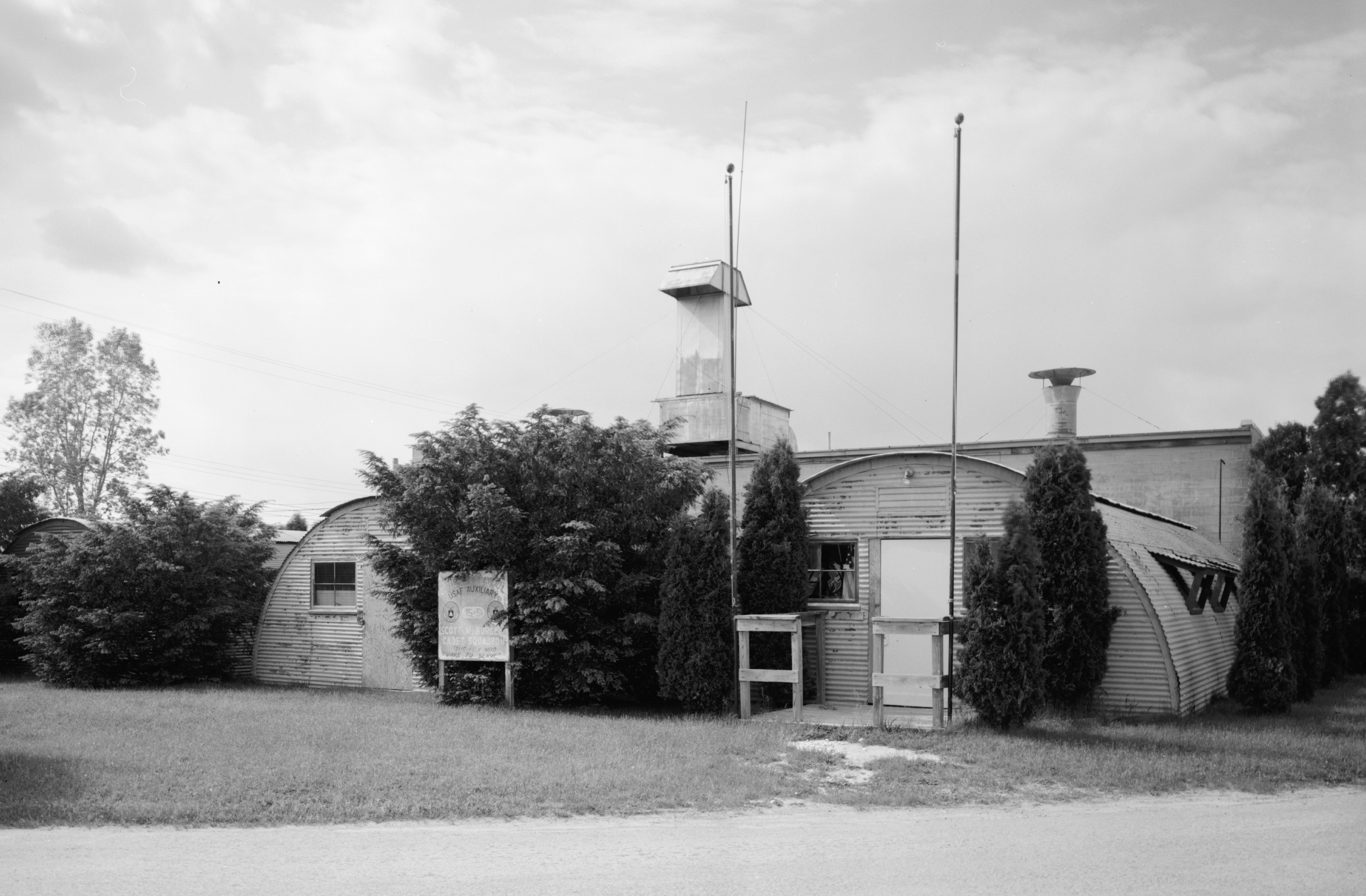

- Location within Michigan Location within the United States
- Interactive map
- Location: 16601 Airport Rd., Lansing, Michigan
- Coordinates: 42°46′31″N 84°36′9″W
- Area: less than one acre
- Built by: Butler Manufacturing Co.
- Architectural style: Quonset huts
- NRHP reference No.: 91001017

Significant dates
- Added to NRHP: August 16, 1991
- Removed from NRHP: April 27, 2026

The Civil Air Patrol Quonset Huts were three Quonset huts located at 16601 Airport Road in Lansing, Michigan, near Capital Region International Airport. The huts were listed on the National Register of Historic Places in 1991, and are part of the Historic American Engineering Record. The huts are missing and presumed demolished; they were removed from the National Register in 2026..

== History ==
These Quonset hits were manufactured by the Butler Manufacturing Company and shipped to Lansing in 1941. They were set up at this location in November, 1941 to house the newly established 9622nd USAF Reserve Recovery Unit. Soon after, the Civil Air Patrol was established, and the Lansing unit began using the huts. For the remainder of World War II, the Lansing Quonset huts were used as a pilot training facility for both the Civil Air Patrol and the USAF Reserve Recovery Unit. The three huts were used continually after the war until 1958, when they were dismantled and put into storage in response to a perceived military threat to the airport. However, the huts were put back into service in 1963, and were used until at least the early 1990s, despite planned demolition in the 1980s.

However, by 1995, the huts were deemed as airport hazards by the Federal Aviation Administration and vacated. Demolition was scheduled at that time.

== Description ==
The three Quonset huts sat side by side. All three were constructed from prefabricated corrugated steel panels placed horizontally over arched steel ribs and purloins. The huts were eighteen by forty-eight feet, with a center height of eleven feet. Each hut had a single door on the end, and eight windows, four on each side, measuring 31 by 39 inches. The windows were hinged at the top of the frame and open from the bottom.

== Gallery ==
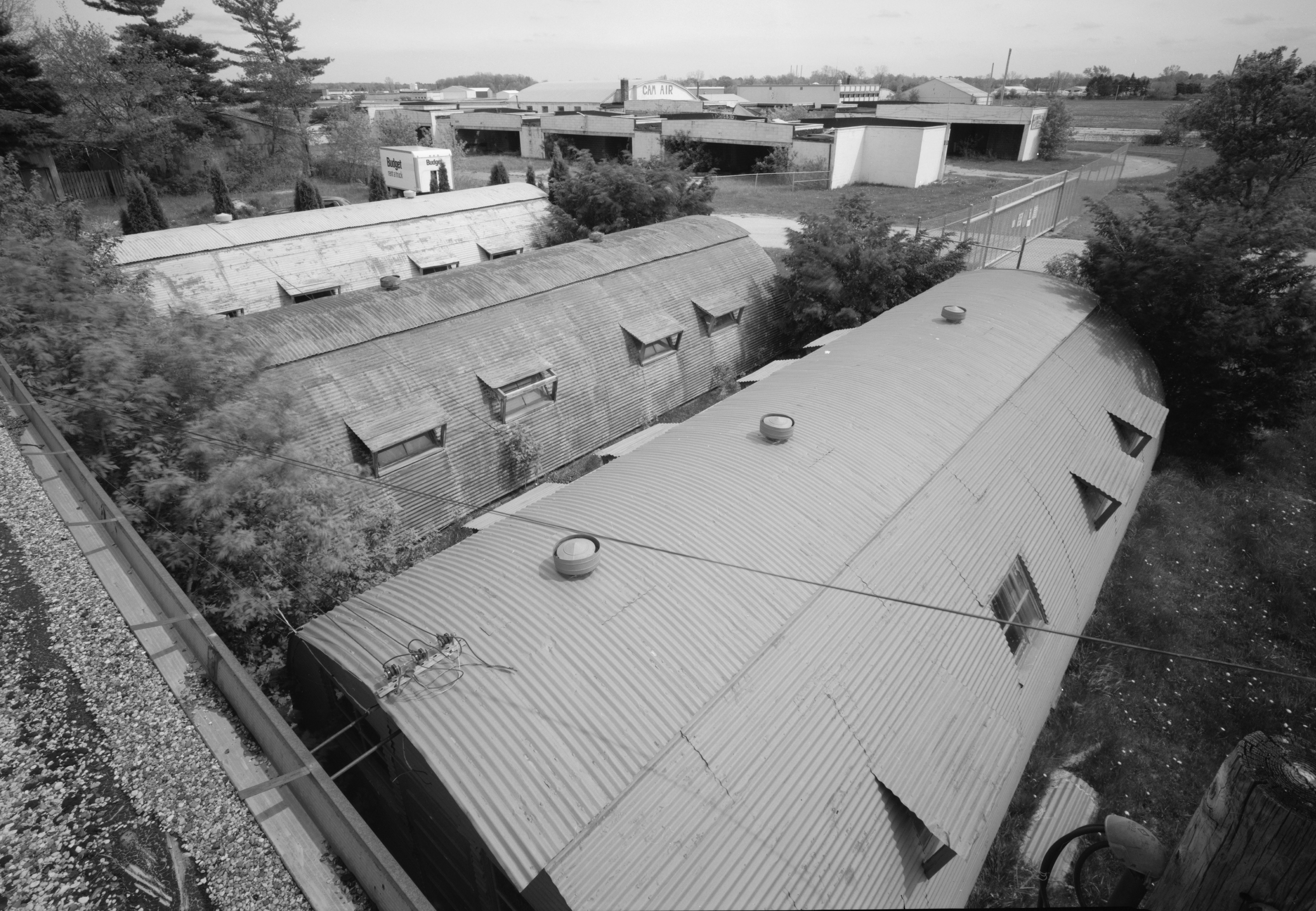
Huts from above

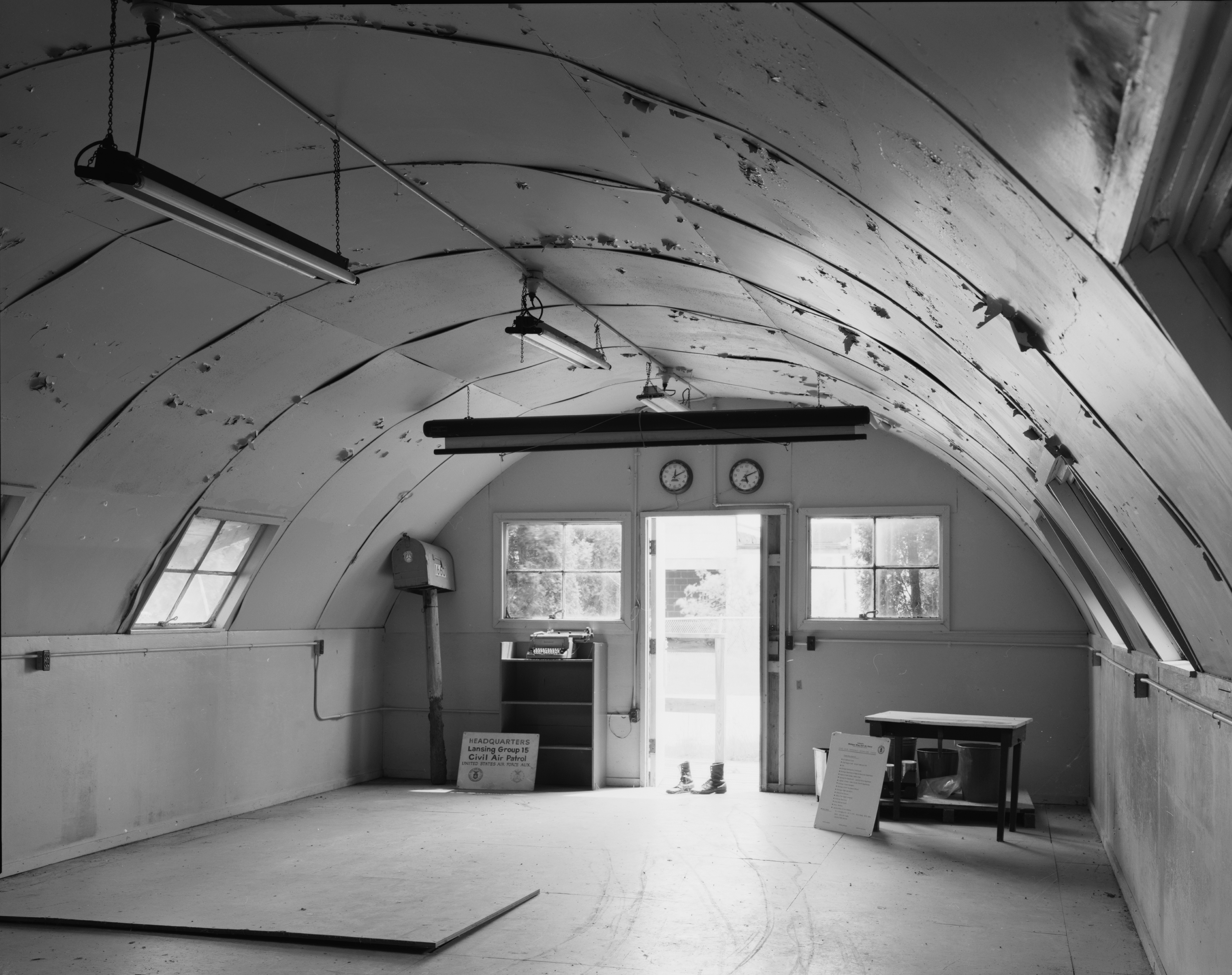
Interior

== See also ==
- Capital Region International Airport
- Lansing, Michigan
