= Isaac N. Reynolds House =

- U.S. National Register of Historic Places
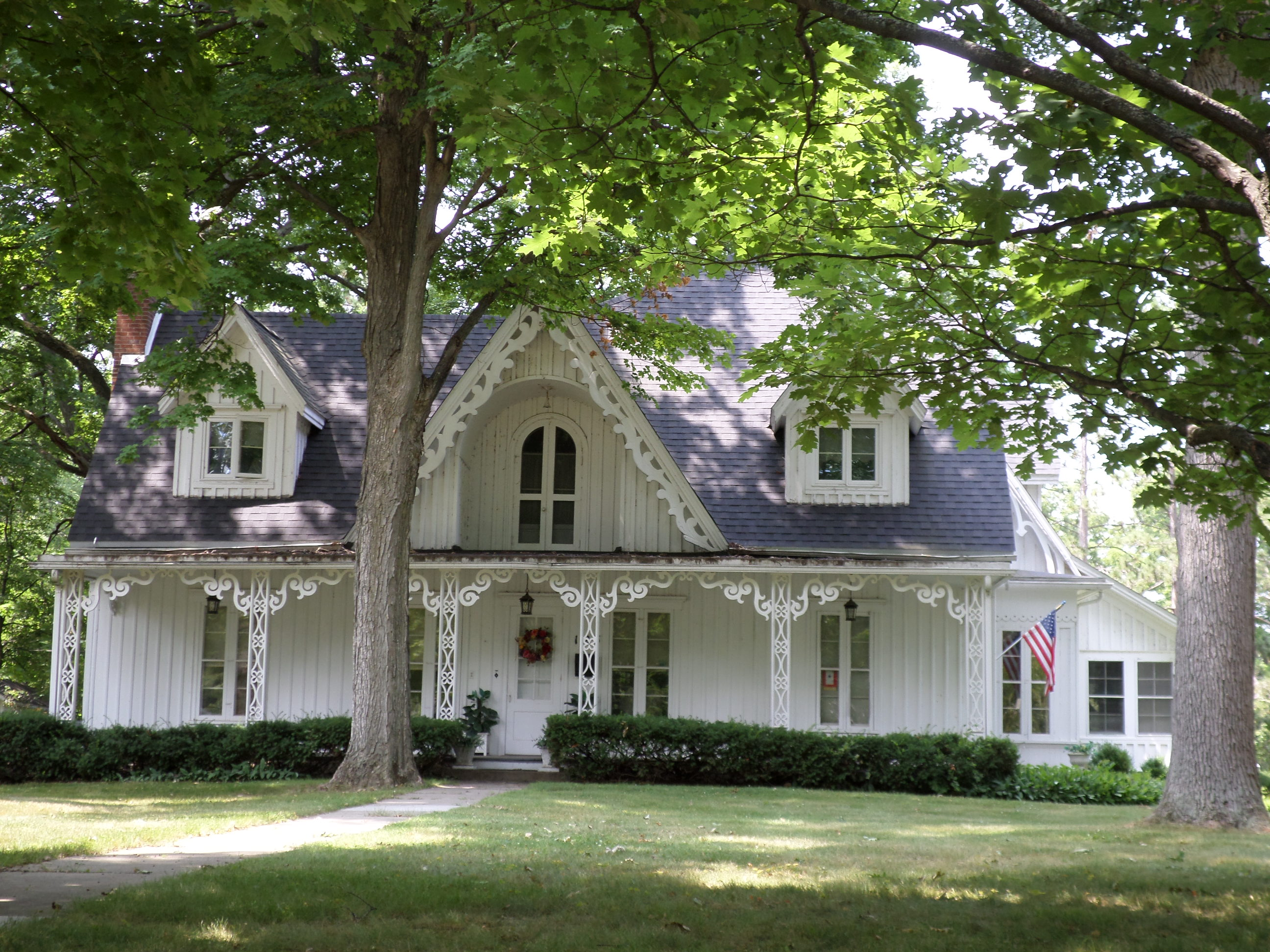

- Location within Michigan Location within the United States
- Interactive map
- Location: 123 N. East St., Eaton Rapids, Michigan
- Coordinates: 42°30′49″N 84°39′4″W
- Area: 0 acres (0 ha)
- Built: 1866
- Architectural style: Gothic Revival
- NRHP reference No.: 74000983
- Added to NRHP: July 18, 1974

The Isaac N. Reynolds House is a private house located at 123 North East Street in Eaton Rapids, Michigan. It was listed on the National Register of Historic Places in 1974. It is one of the finest Gothic Revival houses in Michigan.

== History ==
Issac N. Reynolds was born in New York state in 1830, and moved with his family to Eaton County in 1836. The Reynolds family was one of the earliest to settle in the area. Isaac's father died in 1848, and Isaac purchased the family farm. In 1865, he moved to Eaton Rapids and purchased a plot of land covering what is now several city blocks. In 1866, had this house constructed, and in 1870 subdivided his original purchase, platting out streets and lots. Reynolds lived here until his death in 1916.

== Description ==
The Reynolds House is a frame Gothic Revival cottage sitting on a stone foundation and clad with vertical siding. There is large wing at the rear, probably added in the early twentieth century. The facade has a massive, recessed gable with decorated verge boards. A full length veranda runs across the front, supported by heavily ornamented wooden columns.
