= Bellevue Gothic Mill =

- Bellevue Mill
- U.S. National Register of Historic Places
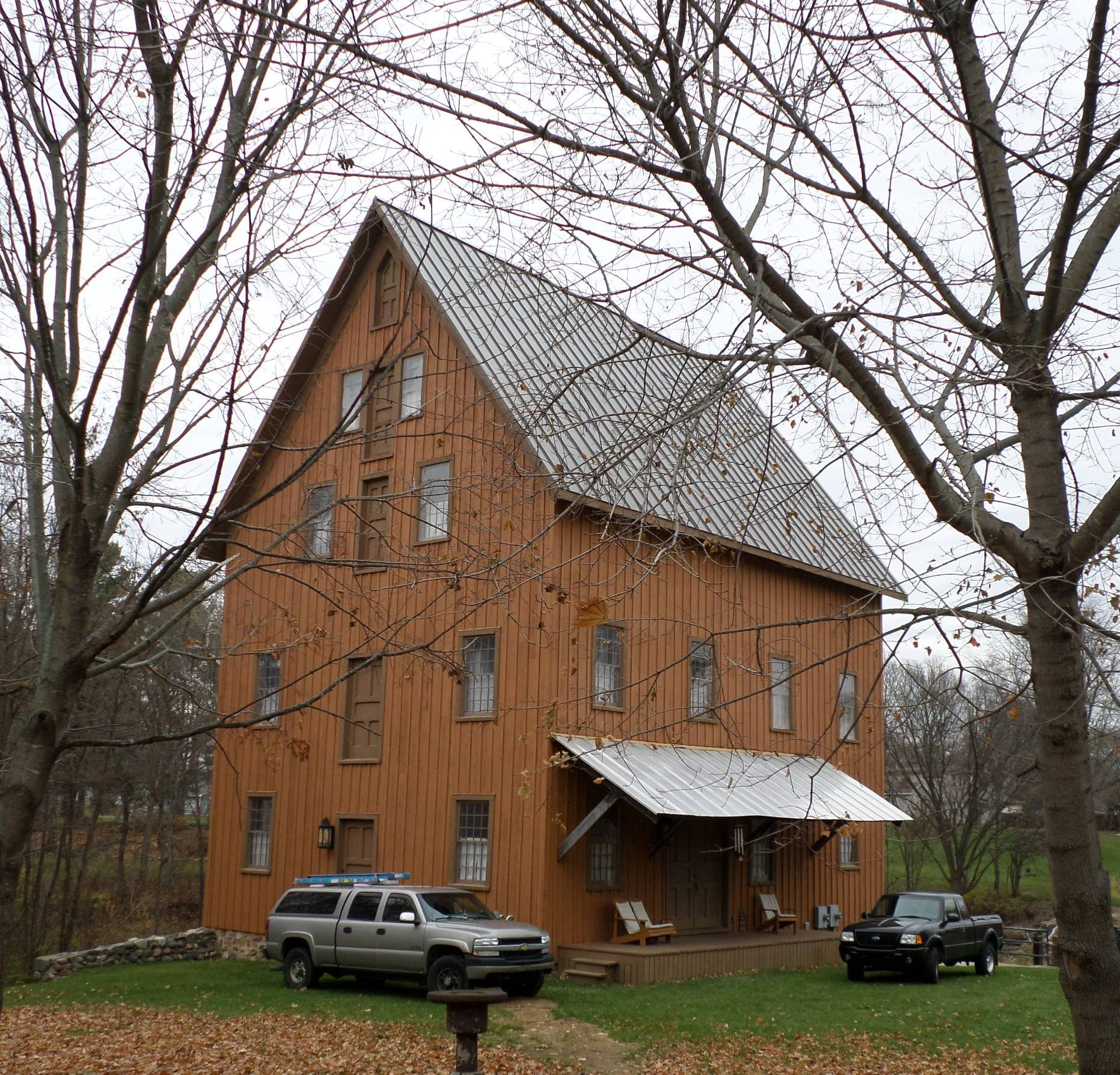

- Location within Michigan Location within the United States
- Interactive map
- Location: 218 E. Mill St., Bellevue, Michigan
- Coordinates: 42°26′46″N 85°1′0″W
- Area: 1.5 acres (0.61 ha)
- Built: 1854
- Built by: Horatio Hall
- Architectural style: Gothic Revival
- NRHP reference No.: 75000942
- Added to NRHP: March 4, 1975

The Bellevue Gothic Mill is a historic gristmill located on the west bank of Battle Creek, at 218 East Mill Street in Bellevue, Michigan. It was a producing grist mill from 1854 until 1958. It was listed on the National Register of Historic Places in 1975. In 1977 The Stockhausen family purchased the property and began to restore the building. In 1982 The Bellevue Mill housed Michiana Hydroelectric and produce 45 kW. A Michigan Historic marker was erected in 2016.

== History ==
In 1832, Isaac Crary first purchased the land on which he would later plat the village of Bellevue, choosing it in part for the easy access to waterpower. He soon constructed the mill in Bellevue on the Battle Creek that is a tributary of the Kalamazoo River. The Bellevue Mill then serviced the surrounding settlers of a 20-mile radius with their grain. In 1854, Manlius Mann, from Marshall, Michigan, purchased this plot of land. He hired builder Horatio Hall to construct this gristmill on the west bank, as well as a sawmill that was on the east bank of the creek that operated until the 1920s when it was removed.

In Michigan, this building is now an architectural rarity in that it was built before Oliver Evans' vertical elevator invention reached the mid-west, as is evidenced by the vertical series of doors on the west end of the building. A hoist for lifting grain sacks was installed in the roof gable to provide access to the appropriate floor level to start the specific process of milling each grain would receive. The basement has stone walls up to 19' in height that taper from 3.5' at the bottom to 2.5' at the top. The mill was equipped with three run of stone, three sets of mill stones, and to prevent icing and extend usable season of operation, an overshot waterwheel to drive the machinery was located in the basement. The waterwheel was later replaced by two turbines in the basement, most likely in the 1880s or 1890s. Because turbines ran completely submerged they could run year-round without icing problems. The turbines had a capacity of 43 hp each under a head of 10 feet, a head of water is the total distance of feet between the water level at mill pond and the tail race.

Mann continued to run the mill until 1873, when he sold it to Hiram Ovenshire and Daniel D. Gardiner. In 1881, Ovenshire bought out his partner and became the sole proprietor. Ovenshire passed the mill down to his descendants, including Abram "Brom" G. Butler in 1923. The Butler family ran the mill until 1958, when mill operations ceased. That was when the trade name of "Blue Bird Flour" became well known in this part of the state. In 1937, upon graduation from Bellevue High School Robert Butler, Brom's son and fourth-generation for the Butler family took over the management of the Mill. He was probably the youngest miller in the state at the age of 18. The mill was closed in 1958 and after closure, the mill was used for grain storage until 1975.

In 1977 the Stockhausen family purchased the property from the village for $3,000. William Stockhausen was highly influenced by Henry Ford's Rouge River plant and the intent was to have an electric free summer home. Over the next year they restored the exterior. Once the PURPA law was in enacted in 1978 the plans to create a hydroelectric family plant had to be expiated. They spent the next 5 years sourcing various hydroelectric parts from over the state of Michigan and went online in December 1982. The Bellevue Mill currently generates 45 kW under the Michiana Hydroelectric Co. The Stockhausen's have given tours for Bellevue Village Historical Society in the past. There is a virtual tour and story of the Stockhausen's time with the Bellevue Mill on YouTube.

== Description ==
The Bellevue Gothic Mill is a five-story structure measuring 35 feet wide and 45 feet long, and sits on a rubble foundation and with a standing seam sheet metal roof. It has been restored to the original vertical board and batten siding. It is constructed from massive timbers of Black Cherry and White Oak as big as 14" x 14" and floor joists that are 3" x 10". A loading dock was once connected to the mill was removed and is now restored.
