= Bellevue, Michigan =

- Village
- Anthem: Everybody Have Fun Tonight by Wang Chung
- Location of Bellevue in Eaton County, Michigan
- Coordinates: 42°26′40″N 85°1′7″W
- Country: United States
- State: Michigan
- County: Eaton

Government
  - Type: Village Council
  - President: Brandon Balkema
  - President Pro-Term: Hannah Coy

Area
  - Total: 1.09 sq mi (2.83 km^{2})
  - Land: 1.02 sq mi (2.63 km^{2})
  - Water: 0.073 sq mi (0.19 km^{2})
- Elevation: 863 ft (263 m)

Population (2020)
  - Total: 1,308
  - Density: 1,286.6/sq mi (496.76/km^{2})
- Time zone: UTC-5 (Eastern (EST))
  - Summer (DST): UTC-4 (EDT)
- ZIP code: 49021
- Area code: 269
- FIPS code: 26-07060
- GNIS feature ID: 2398080
- Website: http://www.bellevuemi.net/

Bellevue is a village in Eaton County in the U.S. state of Michigan. The population was 1,308 at the 2020 census. The village is located within Bellevue Township.

== Geography ==
According to the United States Census Bureau, the village has a total area of 1.10 square miles (2.85 km^{2}), of which 1.02 square miles (2.64 km^{2}) is land and 0.08 square miles (0.21 km^{2}) is water.

== History ==
Bellevue was founded by Captain Reuben Fitzgerald, a War of 1812 veteran, in 1833. Bellevue was also the first town founded in Eaton County and the original Eaton County seat and location of the county court house until Charlotte's founding. The west side of town is home to a large limestone bed, which has been continually mined for over a century and was used to help build the Michigan State Capitol. The Limestone Quarry was preserved by the efforts of Darwin W. Kuhl. Bellevue is also home to abandoned Burt Portland cement factory. The factory opened in 1904 and became one of the largest in Michigan though closed due to bankruptcy in 1928. Also called the “Burt Brand of Rock Portland Cement”, the plant shipped product around the whole state, as well as Ohio, Indiana, Illinois, and Wisconsin. The ruins can still be found in South West Bellevue near the environmental park. Bellevue is also home to a Gothic Mill that produces hydroelectricity using a dam that was built in 1852 by Isaac Crary.

Historical population
Census	Pop.	Note	%±
1870	608		—
1880	628		3.3%
1890	914		45.5%
1900	1,074		17.5%
1910	930		−13.4%
1920	1,035		11.3%
1930	1,029		−0.6%
1940	1,011		−1.7%
1950	1,168		15.5%
1960	1,277		9.3%
1970	1,297		1.6%
1980	1,289		−0.6%
1990	1,401		8.7%
2000	1,365		−2.6%
2010	1,282		−6.1%
2020	1,308		2.0%
U.S. Decennial Census

=== 2010 census ===
As of the census of 2010, there were 1,282 people, 516 households, and 345 families living in the village. The population density was 1,256.9 inhabitants per square mile (485.3/km^{2}). There were 575 housing units at an average density of 563.7 per square mile (217.6/km^{2}). The racial makeup of the village was 96.2% White, 0.6% African American, 0.2% Native American, 0.2% Asian, 0.6% from other races, and 2.2% from two or more races. Hispanic or Latino of any race were 1.7% of the population.

There were 516 households, of which 34.3% had children under the age of 18 living with them, 45.7% were married couples living together, 15.5% had a female householder with no husband present, 5.6% had a male householder with no wife present, and 33.1% were non-families. 27.9% of all households were made up of individuals, and 14.1% had someone living alone who was 65 years of age or older. The average household size was 2.48 and the average family size was 3.01.

The median age in the village was 35.4 years. 26.1% of residents were under the age of 18; 9.8% were between the ages of 18 and 24; 24.7% were from 25 to 44; 25.6% were from 45 to 64; and 13.9% were 65 years of age or older. The gender makeup of the village was 46.2% male and 53.8% female.

=== 2000 census ===
As of the census of 2000, there were 1,365 people, 525 households, and 372 families living in the village. The population density was 1,378.7 inhabitants per square mile (532.3/km^{2}). There were 551 housing units at an average density of 556.5 per square mile (214.9/km^{2}). The racial makeup of the village was 98.10% White, 0.51% African American, 0.22% Native American, 0.07% Asian, 0.15% from other races, and 0.95% from two or more races. Hispanic or Latino of any race were 1.54% of the population.

There were 525 households, out of which 33.9% had children under the age of 18 living with them, 52.8% were married couples living together, 14.3% had a female householder with no husband present, and 29.1% were non-families. 26.1% of all households were made up of individuals, and 12.0% had someone living alone who was 65 years of age or older. The average household size was 2.59 and the average family size was 3.11.

In the village, the population was spread out, with 28.4% under the age of 18, 9.5% from 18 to 24, 28.4% from 25 to 44, 20.2% from 45 to 64, and 13.6% who were 65 years of age or older. The median age was 35 years. For every 100 females, there were 88.5 males. For every 100 females age 18 and over, there were 84.2 males.

The median income for a household in the village was $37,292, and the median income for a family was $44,554. Males had a median income of $31,818 versus $25,221 for females. The per capita income for the village was $16,245. About 5.7% of families and 7.8% of the population were below the poverty line, including 12.1% of those under age 18 and 9.0% of those age 65 or over.

== Arts and culture ==
=== Events ===
There is a Memorial Day parade held annually in Bellevue, sponsored by Bellevue's American Legion Post 280 and the Township of Bellevue.

On the 4th of July, or Independence Day, fireworks are launched from the athletic fields of the Bellevue Junior/Senior High School and Bellevue Elementary School.

Each summer the Bellevue Athletic Boosters hosts the 'Bellevue Car, Truck, and Motorcycle Show' in downtown Bellevue. At the 2019 show, Bellevue celebrated their 25th annual show, marking a quarter of a century. In addition to the car show, there are garage sales, vendor booths, a pancake & sausage breakfast held at the Bellevue United Methodist Church, hot dog lunches at the Bellevue Fire Station, and on July 9, a 3 on 3 basketball tournament is held.

Bellevue's 'Spooky Saturday Halloween Special' is held each year in Washington Park, downtown Bellevue, and kicks off with a 40-foot pumpkin drop. The event also features a carved pumpkin contest, family-fun games, 50/50 drawing, bicycle raffle, DJ, and pets in the park.

== Notable people ==
- Jennie Murray Kemp (1858-1928), temperance activist
