= Grand Ledge Chair Company Plant =

- U.S. National Register of Historic Places
- Michigan State Historic Site
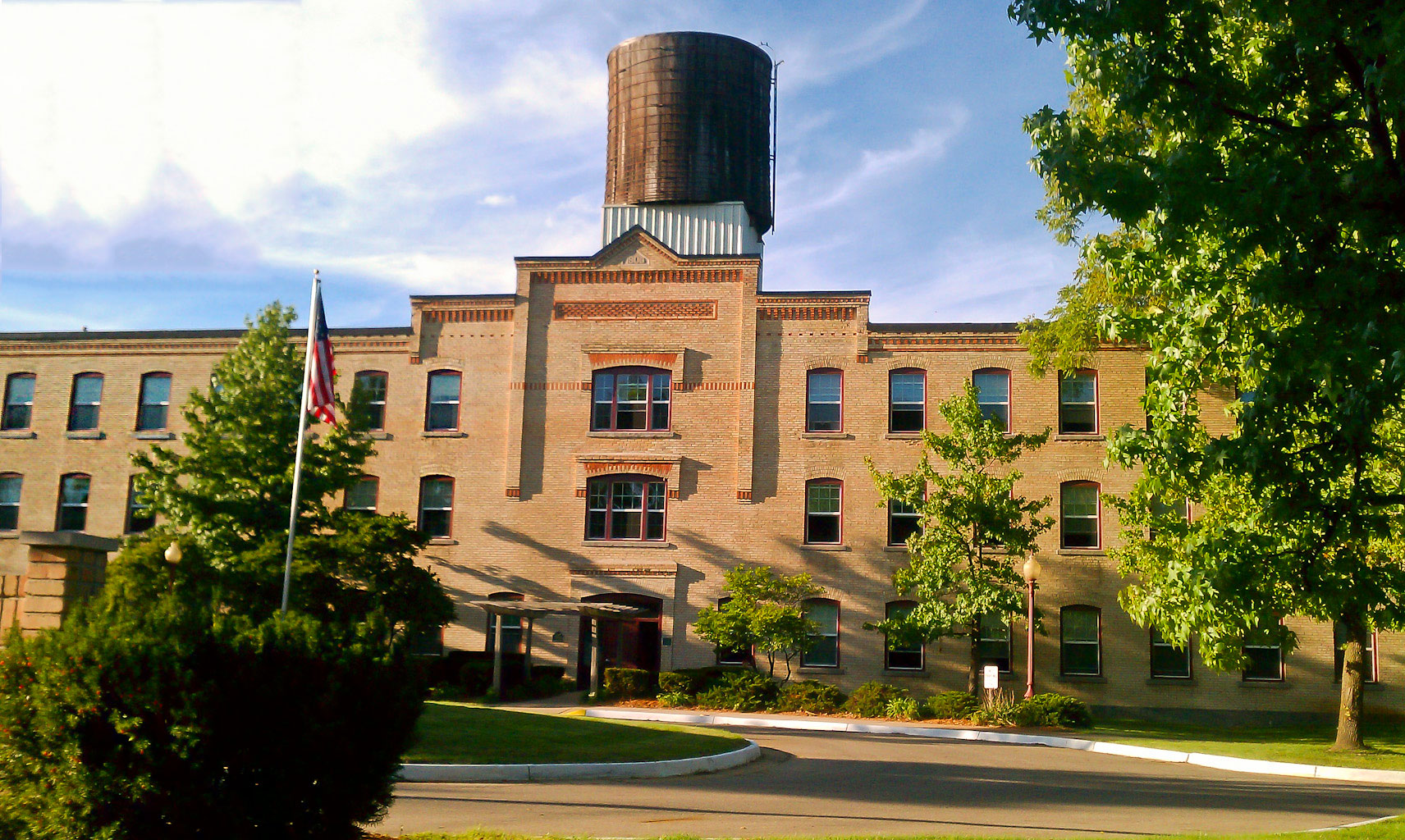

- Location within Michigan Location within the United States
- Interactive map
- Location: 101 Perry St. Grand Ledge, Michigan
- Coordinates: 42°45′25″N 84°45′18″W
- Area: less than one acre
- Built: 1906
- NRHP reference No.: 87001377

Significant dates
- Added to NRHP: November 3, 1987
- Designated MSHS: April 20, 1989

The Grand Ledge Chair Company Plant is a historic building at 101 Perry Street in Grand Ledge, Michigan, United States. It was built in 1906 and added to the National Register of Historic Places in 1987. The building has been refurbished into the Riverwalk Apartments.

== History ==
The Grand Ledge Chair Company was founded in 1837 as a small furniture shop by Thomas Garrett, Harry Jordan, and Edward Crawford. The three reorganized and incorporated in 1888, and sold the business to Edward H. Turnbull and George H. Fletcher in 1893. Turnbull soon bought out Fletcher, gaining complete control of the company. The firm prospered under Turnbull. In 1902, Turnbull founded the Grand Ledge Table Company along with David Bell and George Coryell. They constructed a factory and mill at this site, which turned out both tables and chairs. Turnbull soon bought out the others, gaining control of the Table Company. In 1906, Turnbull constructed a new three-story factory on the site, adjacent to the 1902 plant. The new building had shipping and offices on the first floor, upholstering and storage on the second, and finishing on the third.

Edward Turnbull managed the Grand Ledge Chair Company until his death in 1916, after which it passed to his wife Emma A. Turnbull. Emma managed it until her death in 1944, after which it passed to her youngest sister and her husband, Raymond Hull. The company incorporated in 1949, but continued to be managed by Hull and his family until 1973. After that, the company became a division of Holabird Company, a manufacturing holding company, but due to falling sales, the plant closed in 1981. In the late 1980s, the site was refurbished into apartments. As part of this, the 1902 structures were razed, along with more modern ones, leaving only the 1906 plant. The building continues to be used for residential apartments.

== Description ==
The Grand Ledge Chair Company Plant is located on a bluff overlooking the Grand River. The 1906 factory building is a three-story cream-colored brick building 353 feet long and 50 feet wide. The font facade had regularly spaced windows in segmental-arched openings. The center entrance is set into a bay with a stepped-gable design, containing tripartite windows in the second and third stories above. Atop the roof on a square base is a wood-slat water tank held together with steel bands.
