= Hance House (Olivet, Michigan) =

- U.S. National Register of Historic Places
- Michigan State Historic Site
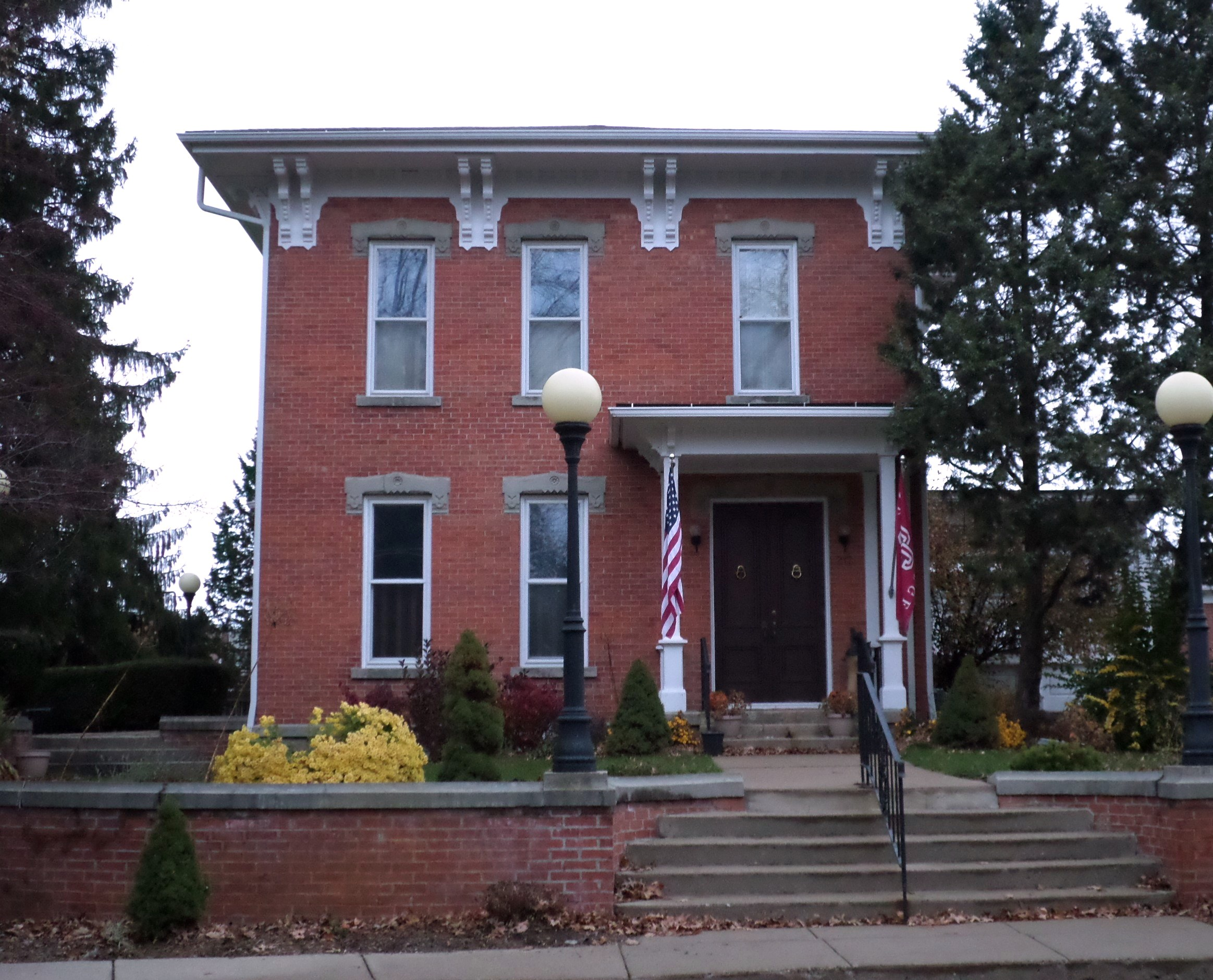

- Location within Michigan Location within the United States
- Interactive map
- Location: 217 Yale St., Olivet, Michigan
- Coordinates: 42°26′22″N 84°55′17″W
- Area: 1 acre (0.40 ha)
- Built: 1884
- Architectural style: Late Victorian
- NRHP reference No.: 72000609
- Added to NRHP: August 21, 1972

The Hance House is a private house located at 217 Yale Street in Olivet, Michigan. It was listed on the National Register of Historic Places in 1972.

== History ==
Myram H. Hance arrived in Michigan from New York state in 1843. He was a businessman, and served in the Civil War. In 1884, he moved to Olivet, supposedly so that his children could attend Olivet College. Once in Olivet, he became involved in the manufacture of boots and shoes, and constructed this house for his family.

The house was acquired by Olivet College in 1934. The college used it variously as the president's residence, a fraternity house, a dormitory, a faculty residence, and as the location of the art department and studios. By 1971, the house was vacant. It remained vacant until at least the 1980s, but the college eventually restored the house, and it serves as the president's residence.

== Description ==
The Hance House is a two-story brick structure on a stone foundation, with stone lintels over the windows and doorways. The roof is a low-pitched design, supported by carved bracketry. The front entrance is through a double door sheltered by a porch. A side entrance is sheltered by a similar porch, and both porches have bracketry similar to, but smaller than, those supporting the roof.
