= Vermontville, Michigan =

- Village
- Seal
- Motto: Home of the Original Maple Syrup Festival in Michigan
- Location of Vermontville, Michigan
- Coordinates: 42°37′37″N 85°1′25″W
- Country: United States
- State: Michigan
- County: Eaton
- Founded: 1836

Area
  - Total: 1.28 sq mi (3.31 km^{2})
  - Land: 1.27 sq mi (3.28 km^{2})
  - Water: 0.012 sq mi (0.03 km^{2})
- Elevation: 935 ft (285 m)

Population (2020)
  - Total: 716
  - Density: 565.3/sq mi (218.28/km^{2})
- Time zone: UTC-5 (EST)
  - Summer (DST): UTC-4 (EDT)
- ZIP code: 49096
- Area code: 517
- FIPS code: 26-81960
- GNIS feature ID: 1615548
- Website: vermontville-mi.gov

Vermontville is a village in Eaton County in the U.S. state of Michigan. The population was 716 at the 2020 census. It is located within Vermontville Township. Vermontville is home to the original maple syrup festival in Michigan, held the last full weekend in April.

Vermontville is served by Maple Valley Schools.

== History ==
The Village of Vermontville was organized in 1836 by the Reverend Sylvester Cochrane, a Congregational minister from East Poultney, Vermont and the Union Colony. The village was incorporated on March 11, 1871, by an act of the Legislature.

The Village of Vermontville is served by the Vermontville Township Public Library, which opened its doors on opened February 12, 1949. The library is located on the first floor of the Opera House.

The Fire Department was established in 1836 with a cooperative effort between the Village of Vermontville and Vermontville Township. It is now under the control of the Township.

Vermontville Academy & Museum (erected 1844 owned by Vermontville First Congregational Church; original First Congregational Church).

Vermontville Opera House (erected 1893 or 1896; completed 1898 by Village of Vermontville and Vermontville Township; joint ownership).

Vermontville First Congregational Church (erected 1864).

Vermontville United Methodist Church (erected 1862 / moved to Village of Vermontville 1877).

== Geography ==
According to the United States Census Bureau, the village has a total area of 1.27 square miles (3.29 km^{2}), of which, 1.26 square miles (3.26 km^{2}) of it is land and 0.01 square miles (0.03 km^{2}) is water.

== Weather ==
Climate data for Vermontville, MI
Month	Jan	Feb	Mar	Apr	May	Jun	Jul	Aug	Sep	Oct	Nov	Dec	Year
Record high °F (°C)	65 (18)	67 (19)	87 (31)	88 (31)	92 (33)	101 (38)	106 (41)	102 (39)	100 (38)	90 (32)	79 (26)	66 (19)	106 (41)
Mean daily maximum °F (°C)	30.3 (−0.9)	33.2 (0.7)	43.3 (6.3)	57.7 (14.3)	69.4 (20.8)	78.8 (26.0)	82.6 (28.1)	80.6 (27.0)	73.5 (23.1)	61.6 (16.4)	46.9 (8.3)	34.3 (1.3)	57.7 (14.3)
Mean daily minimum °F (°C)	14.1 (−9.9)	15 (−9)	23.6 (−4.7)	34.9 (1.6)	45.1 (7.3)	54.5 (12.5)	58 (14)	56.3 (13.5)	49 (9)	38.7 (3.7)	29.6 (−1.3)	19.4 (−7.0)	36.5 (2.5)
Record low °F (°C)	−26 (−32)	−31 (−35)	−17 (−27)	3 (−16)	18 (−8)	30 (−1)	39 (4)	33 (1)	24 (−4)	14 (−10)	−9 (−23)	−23 (−31)	−31 (−35)
Average precipitation inches (mm)	1.8 (46)	1.5 (38)	2.2 (56)	3.3 (84)	3.4 (86)	3.7 (94)	3.1 (79)	3.2 (81)	3.3 (84)	2.8 (71)	2.8 (71)	2.2 (56)	33.4 (850)
Average snowfall inches (cm)	13 (33)	8.8 (22)	6.2 (16)	1.8 (4.6)	0 (0)	0 (0)	0 (0)	0 (0)	0 (0)	0.3 (0.76)	3 (7.6)	10.9 (28)	44 (110)
Average precipitation days	10.6	8.7	9.7	11.1	10.9	9.9	8.7	8.7	9.6	9.7	10.5	11	118.3
Source: Weatherbase

== Vermontville Maple Syrup Festival ==
Vermontville is home to the original maple syrup festival in Michigan held the last full weekend in April. In 2011, the festival was held on April 29, 30, and May 1. This was because Easter fell on Sunday of the last full weekend that year. The festival was proposed one day during a conversation at a local barber shop in 1940, with the idea of promoting the village.

=== Queen and Court ===
Currently, all young women in their junior year (grade 11) at Maple Valley Schools are eligible to compete for the title of Vermontville Maple Syrup Festival Queen and her court. The festival is held the last full weekend in April.

== Recreation/parks ==
Vermontville contains three public parks:

- In the center of the Village as part of the Public Square. A Vietnam Veteran's memorial is located here. This park includes playground equipment and picnic tables.
- Third Street at the Water Tower lot. This park includes 1 pee wee ball field, 1 T-ball field, playground equipment, picnic pavilion, and basketball court.
- East First Street. This park is used by a Youth Baseball League in May and June and is available the remainder of the time. This park contains a ball field.
- The town is the terminus of the Paul Henry–Thornapple Rail Trail.
- A Conservation District park has a canoe/kayak launch with benches and parking at Mason Road and the Thornapple River behind the High School.

== Notable residents ==
- Homer G. Barber (1830–1909), Michigan state senator
- Duane Hawkins (1840–1899), Michigan state representative

== Demographics ==
Historical population
Census	Pop.	Note	%±
1870	544		—
1880	623		14.5%
1890	730		17.2%
1900	684		−6.3%
1910	650		−5.0%
1920	585		−10.0%
1930	581		−0.7%
1940	564		−2.9%
1950	707		25.4%
1960	768		8.6%
1970	857		11.6%
1980	832		−2.9%
1990	776		−6.7%
2000	789		1.7%
2010	759		−3.8%
2020	716		−5.7%
U.S. Decennial Census

=== 2010 census ===
As of the census of 2010, there were 759 people, 291 households, and 199 families residing in the village. The population density was 602.4 inhabitants per square mile (232.6/km^{2}). There were 331 housing units at an average density of 262.7 per square mile (101.4/km^{2}). The racial makeup of the village was 97.1% White, 0.8% Native American, 0.3% Asian, and 1.8% from two or more races. Hispanic or Latino of any race were 2.4% of the population.

There were 291 households, of which 36.4% had children under the age of 18 living with them, 50.5% were married couples living together, 10.3% had a female householder with no husband present, 7.6% had a male householder with no wife present, and 31.6% were non-families. 25.4% of all households were made up of individuals, and 13% had someone living alone who was 65 years of age or older. The average household size was 2.61 and the average family size was 3.06.

The median age in the village was 36.3 years. 26.2% of residents were under the age of 18; 8.6% were between the ages of 18 and 24; 25.9% were from 25 to 44; 25% were from 45 to 64; and 14.1% were 65 years of age or older. The gender makeup of the village was 52.2% male and 47.8% female.

=== 2000 census ===
As of the census of 2000, there were 789 people, 287 households, and 216 families residing in the village. The population density was 651.8 inhabitants per square mile (251.7/km^{2}). There were 316 housing units at an average density of 261.1 per square mile (100.8/km^{2}). The racial makeup of the village was 97.21% White, 0.76% Native American, 0.25% Asian, 0.25% from other races, and 1.52% from two or more races. Hispanic or Latino of any race were 0.51% of the population. 23.5% were of German, 17.8% English, 15.1% American, 7.8% Dutch and 6.5% Irish ancestry according to Census 2000.

There were 287 households, out of which 41.5% had children under the age of 18 living with them, 55.7% were married couples living together, 13.2% had a female householder with no husband present, and 24.7% were non-families. 20.6% of all households were made up of individuals, and 9.8% had someone living alone who was 65 years of age or older. The average household size was 2.73 and the average family size was 3.14.

In the village, the population was spread out, with 33.2% under the age of 18, 5.8% from 18 to 24, 30.0% from 25 to 44, 20.4% from 45 to 64, and 10.5% who were 65 years of age or older. The median age was 33 years. For every 100 females, there were 92.4 males. For every 100 females age 18 and over, there were 87.5 males.

The median income for a household in the village was $40,441, and the median income for a family was $43,393. Males had a median income of $40,625 versus $25,156 for females. The per capita income for the village was $17,582. About 7.0% of families and 9.7% of the population were below the poverty line, including 10.2% of those under age 18 and 12.9% of those age 65 or over.
