= List of Alma Scots head football coaches =

The Alma Scots football program is a college football team that represents Alma College as a member of the Michigan Intercollegiate Athletic Association (MIAA) as the NCAA Division III level. The team has had 30 head coaches since its first recorded football game in 1894. The current head coach is Jason Couch, who has served in that position since the 2018 season.

== Key ==
Key to symbols in coaches list
General		Overall		Conference		Postseason (Note: Although the first Rose Bowl Game was played in 1902, it has been continuously played since the 1916 game, and is recognized as the oldest bowl game by the NCAA. "—" indicates any season prior to 1916 when postseason games were not played.)	
No.	Order of coaches (Note: A running total of the number of head coaches, with coaches who served separate tenures being counted only once. Interim head coaches are represented with "Int" and are not counted in the running total. "—" indicates the team played but either without a coach or no coach is on record. "X" indicates an interim year without play.)	GC	Games coached	CW	Conference wins	PW	Postseason wins
DC	Division championships	OW	Overall wins	CL	Conference losses	PL	Postseason losses
CC	Conference championships	OL	Overall losses	CT	Conference ties	PT	Postseason ties
NC	National championships	OT	Overall ties (Note: Overtime rules in college football were introduced in 1996, making ties impossible in the period since.)	C%	Conference winning percentage		
†	Elected to the College Football Hall of Fame	O%	Overall winning percentage (Note: When computing the win–loss percentage, a tie counts as half a win and half a loss.)				

== Coaches ==
Statistics correct as of the end of the 2025 season.

No.	Name	Term	GC	OW	OL	OT	O%	CW	CL	CT	C%	PW	PL	CCs	NCs	Awards
1	John T. Ewing	1894	2	2	0	0	1.000	—	—	—		—	—	—	—	
2	Ignatius M. Duffy	1895	4	3	1	0	.750	—	—	—		—	—	—	—	
3	C. E. Woodruff	1896	3	2	0	1	.833	—	—	—		—	—	—	—	
4	John H. Rice	1897	6	4	2	0	.667	—	—	—		—	—	—	—	
5	George B. Wells (Note: George B. Well, a student, coached the team before the season.)	1898	3	1	2	0	.333	—	—	—		—	—	—	—	
5a	George Sweetland (Note: George Sweetland took over the team once the season started.)	1898	3	1	2	0	.333	—	—	—		—	—	—	—	
6	Edward Fauver	1899	6	2	1	3	.583	—	—	—		—	—	—	—	
7	Charles A. Allen	1900	9	6	2	1	.722	—	—	—		—	—	—	—	
8	Theron W. Mortimer	1901	5	3	2	0	.600	—	—	—		—	—	—	—	
9	Fred M. Hatch	1902	6	5	1	0	.833	4	1	0	.800	—	—	1	—	
10	Pearl Fuller	1903	8	3	5	0	.375	—	—	—		—	—	—	—	
11	Ebin Wilson	1904–1905	16	9	7	0	.563	—	—	—		—	—	—	—	
12	Jesse Harper^{†}	1906–1907	15	8	3	4	.667	—	—	—		—	—	—	—	
13	Ira T. Carrithers	1908–1909	9	4	5	0	.444	—	—	—		—	—	—	—	
14	Dennis Grady	1910–1911	13	7	6	0	.538	—	—	—		—	—	1	—	
15	Wilfred C. Bleamaster	1912–1916	36	16	17	3	.486	—	—	—		—	—	2	—	
16	Harry Helmer	1917	7	6	1	0	.857	—	—	—		—	—	1	—	
17	Alger H. Wood	1919	8	3	5	0	.375	—	—	—		—	—	—	—	
18	Edwin Steele	1920	7	0	7	0	.000	—	—	—		—	—	—	—	
19	Royal R. Campbell	1921–1935	117	59	48	10	.547	—	—	—		—	—	6	—	
20	Gordon MacDonald	1936–1943	60	33	22	5	.592	—	—	—		—	—	2	—	
21	Floyd E. Lear	1944–1945	13	1	12	0	.077	—	—	—		—	—	—	—	
22	Steve Sebo	1946–1948	23	15	7	1	.674	—	—	—		—	—	1	—	
23	Lloyd Eaton	1949–1955	62	40	20	2	.661	—	—	—		—	—	2	—	
24	Art Smith	1956–1962	60	21	37	2	.367	—	—	—		—	—	—	—	
25	Bill Carr	1963–1964	17	4	13	0	.235	—	—	—		—	—	—	—	
26	Denny Stolz	1965–1970	50	34	16	0	.680	—	—	—		—	—	3	—	
27	Phil Brooks	1971–1990	180	94	86	0	.522	—	—	—		—	—	3	—	
28	Jim Cole	1991–2012	214	115	99	0	.537	68	53	0	.562	0	3	3	—	
29	Greg Pscodna	2012–2017	60	20	40	0	.333	9	27	0	.250	—	—	—	—	
30	Jason Couch	2018–present	78	53	25	0	.679	32	16	0	.667	0	3	3		
