= List of Adrian Bulldogs head football coaches =

The Adrian Bulldogs football program is a college football team that represents Adrian College in the Michigan Intercollegiate Athletic Association, a part of the Division III (NCAA). The team has had 25 head coaches and one interim head coach since its first recorded football game in 1892. The current coach is Joe Palka who first took the position for the 2024 season.

== Key ==
Key to symbols in coaches list
General		Overall		Conference		Postseason (Note: Although the first Rose Bowl Game was played in 1902, it has been continuously played since the 1916 game, and is recognized as the oldest bowl game by the NCAA. "—" indicates any season prior to 1916 when postseason games were not played.)	
No.	Order of coaches (Note: A running total of the number of head coaches, with coaches who served separate tenures being counted only once. Interim head coaches are represented with "Int" and are not counted in the running total. "—" indicates the team played but either without a coach or no coach is on record. "X" indicates an interim year without play.)	GC	Games coached	CW	Conference wins	PW	Postseason wins
DC	Division championships	OW	Overall wins	CL	Conference losses	PL	Postseason losses
CC	Conference championships	OL	Overall losses	CT	Conference ties	PT	Postseason ties
NC	National championships	OT	Overall ties (Note: Overtime rules in college football were introduced in 1996, making ties impossible in the period since.)	C%	Conference winning percentage		
†	Elected to the College Football Hall of Fame	O%	Overall winning percentage (Note: When computing the win–loss percentage, a tie counts as half a win and half a loss.)				

== Coaches ==
No.	Name	Term	GC	OW	OL	OT	O%	CW	CL	CT	C%	PW	PL	CCs	Awards
0	Unknown	1892–1902, 1905	14	2	11	1	.179	—	—	—	—	—	—	—	—
1	E. E. Tarr	1903–1904	13	7	6	0	.538	—	—	—	—	—	—	—	—
2	Coach Huffstrater	1906–1910	26	7	15	4	.346	—	—	—	—	—	—	—	—
3	Tom Leith	1911–1912	16	12	4	0	.750	—	—	—	—	—	—	—	—
4	Coach Brown	1913	6	2	4	0	.333	—	—	—	—	—	—	—	—
5	Frank Coombs	1914	6	3	3	0	.500	—	—	—	—	—	—	—	—
6	W. H. Dague	1915	7	2	5	0	.286	—	—	—	—	—	—	—	—
7	Perry Grimm	1916–1917	4	1	3	0	.250	—	—	—	—	—	—	—	—
X	No team	1918	—	—	—	—	—	—	—	—	—	—	—	—	—
8	Harvey E. Orwick	1919	6	4	2	0	.667	—	—	—	—	—	—	—	—
9	B. M. Allman	1921–1922	8	5	2	1	.688	—	—	—	—	—	—	—	—
10	Dale R. "Spank" Sprankle	1923–1935	115	55	52	8	.513	—	—	—	—	—	—	—	—
11	Frank Ballenger	1936–1937	18	4	14	0	.222	—	—	—	—	—	—	—	—
12	Harve A. Oliphant	1938–1941	32	5	26	1	.172	—	—	—	—	—	—	—	—
X	No team	1942–1945	—	—	—	—	—	—	—	—	—	—	—	—	—
13	Lyman E. Abbott	1946–1949	33	12	20	1	.379	—	—	—	—	—	—	—	—
14	John Darnton	1950	8	2	6	0	.250	—	—	—	—	—	—	—	—
15	Theodore "Ted" Boyett	1951–1952	15	3	11	1	.233	—	—	—	—	—	—	—	—
16	Joe Fortunato	1953–1955	26	8	17	1	.327	—	—	—	—	—	—	—	—
17	Robert Gillis	1956–1958	24	9	15	0	.375	—	—	—	—	—	—	—	—
18	Les Leggett	1959–1961	24	9	14	1	.396	—	—	—	—	—	—	—	—
19	Charles Marvin	1962–1967	47	14	33	0	.298	—	—	—	—	—	—	—	—
20	William C. "Bill" Davis	1968–1973	53	21	32	0	.396	—	—	—	—	—	—	—	—
21	Tom Heckert	1974–1981	72	42	28	2	.597	—	—	—	—	—	—	—	—
22	Ron Labadie	1982–1989	74	53	21	0	.716	—	—	—	—	—	—	—	—
23	Jim Lyall	1990–2009	190	97	92	1	.513	—	—	—	—	—	—	—	—
24	Jim Deere	2010–2023	136	76	60	0	.559	—	—	—	—	—	—	—	—
Int.	Harry Bailey	2023	3	0	3	0	.000	—	—	—	—	—	—	—	—
25	Joe Palka	2024–present	20	14	6	0	.700	—	—	—	—	—	—	—	—

== Details ==
The following are details on coaches that do not have articles on Wikipedia. For coaches with articles on Wikipedia, see links in the table above.

=== Coach Huffstrater ===
An individual with the last name "Huffstrater" was the head coach for 5 seasons, from 1906 until 1910. His coaching record at Adrian was 7 wins, 15 losses and 4 ties. As of the conclusion of the 2010 season, this ranks him #12 at Adrian in total wins and #15 at the school in winning percentage (.346).

=== Coach Brown ===
A coach with the last name "Brown" was in the position for the 1913 season. Brown's coaching record at Adrian was 2 wins and 4 losses. As of the conclusion of the 2010 season, this ranks him #21 at Adrian in total wins and #16 at the school in winning percentage (.333)."
