= 1939 Michigan Intercollegiate Athletic Association football season =

- League: Michigan Intercollegiate Athletic Association
- Sport: Football
- Teams: 7
- Champion: Albion

Football seasons

1939 Michigan Intercollegiate Athletic Association football standings
	Conf.					Overall
Team	W		L		T	W		L		T
Albion $	6	–	0	–	0	7	–	1	–	0
Hillsdale	5	–	1	–	0	6	–	1	–	0
Hope	3	–	2	–	1	4	–	2	–	2
Kalamazoo	3	–	3	–	0	3	–	5	–	0
Alma	2	–	3	–	1	2	–	5	–	1
Adrian	1	–	5	–	0	2	–	6	–	0
Olivet	0	–	6	–	0	1	–	7	–	0
$ – Conference champion

The 1939 Michigan Intercollegiate Athletic Association football season was the season of college football played by the seven member schools of the Michigan Intercollegiate Athletic Association (MIAA) as part of the 1939 college football season.

The Albion Britons, led by head coach Dale R. Sprankle, won the MIAA championship with a 7–1 record (6–0 against conference opponents). The Hillsdale Dales, led by head coach Dwight Harwood, finished in second place with a 6–1 record. They dominated the 1939 All-MIAA football team, taking five of eleven first-team spots.

== Conference overview ==
Conf. rank	Team	Head coach	Overall record	Conf. record	Points scored	Points against
1	Albion	Dale R. Sprankle	7–1	6–0	170	23
2	Hillsdale	Dwight Harwood	6–1	5–1	122	18
3	Hope	Bud Hinga	4–2–2	3–2–1	110	43
4	Kalamazoo	Chester S. Barnard	3–5	3–3		
5	Alma	Gordon MacDonald	2–5–1	2–3–1		
6	Adrian	Harve A. Oliphant	2–6	1–5		
7	Olivet	William Hemingway	1–7	0–6		

== Teams ==
=== Albion ===
1939 Albion Britons football
- Conference: Michigan Intercollegiate Athletic Association
- Record: 7–1 (6–0 MIAA)
- Head coach: Dale R. Sprankle (17th season)
- Home stadium: Alumni Field

The 1939 Albion Britons football team represented Albion College of Albion, Michigan. In their 17th year under head coach Dale R. Sprankle, the Britons compiled a 7–1 record (6–0 against MIAA opponents), shut out five of eight opponents, and outscored all opponents by a total of 170 to 23. They also won the MIAA championship, the school's first football championship since 1928. After losing the opening game of the 1939 season, the Britons won 14 consecutive games during the 1939 and 1940 seasons.

Guard Walter Ptak was the only Albion player to receive first-team honors on the 1939 All-MIAA football team. Back Elwood Linlow and center Fred Cook received second-team honors.

Albion was ranked at No. 363 (out of 609 teams) in the final Litkenhous Ratings for 1939.

Date	Opponent	Site	Result	Source
September 22	at Mount Union*	Alliance, OH	L 0–13	
September 29	at Alma	Alma, MI	W 6–0	
October 6	Kalamazoo	Alumni Field; Albion, MI	W 7–0	
October 14	at Adrian	Adrian, MI	W 51–0	
October 20	Defiance*	Alumni Field; Albion, MI	W 48–0	
October 28	at Hillsdale	Hillsdale, MI	W 6–3	
November 4	Olivet^{†}	Alumni Field; Albion, MI	W 39–0	
November 11	Hope	Alumni Field; Albion, MI	W 13–7	
*Non-conference game; ^{†}Homecoming

=== Hillsdale ===
1939 Hillsdale Dales football
- Conference: Michigan Intercollegiate Athletic Association
- Record: 6–1 (5–1 MIAA)
- Head coach: Dwight Harwood (13th season)

The 1939 Hillsdale Dales football team was an American football team that represented Hillsdale College in the Michigan Intercollegiate Athletic Association (MIAA) during the 1939 college football season. In their 13th year under head coach Dwight Harwood, the Dales compiled a 6–1 record (5–1 against MIAA opponents), finished in second place out of seven teams in the MIAA, shut out four of seven opponents, and outscored all opponents by a total of 122 to 18.

Hillsdale players won five of eleven first-team spots on the 1939 All-MIAA football team. The first-team honorees were: backs Bruce Colburn and Gordon Platt; ends Roland Larson and Jack Nordling; and tackle Max Schnitzler. A third Hillsdale back, Archie Karowski, was named to the second team.

Hillsdale was ranked at No. 359 (out of 609 teams) in the final Litkenhous Ratings for 1939.

Date	Opponent	Site	Result	Source
September 30	at Adrian	Adrian, MI	W 39–0	
October 7	Grand Rapids*	Hillsdale, MI	W 8–6	
October 14	at Kalamazoo	Kalamazoo, MI	W 6–0	
October 21	Alma	Hillsdale, MI	W 6–0	
October 28	Albion	Hillsdale, MI	L 3–6	
November 4	at Hope	Holland, MI	W 10–6	
November 11	Olivet	Hillsdale, MI	W 50–0	
*Non-conference game

=== Hope ===
1939 Hope Flying Dutchmen football
- Conference: Michigan Intercollegiate Athletic Association
- Record: 4–2–2 (3–2–1 MIAA)
- Head coach: Bud Hinga (9th season)

The 1939 Hope Flying Dutchmen football team represented Hope College of Hope, Michigan. In their ninth year under head coach Bud Hinga, the Dutchmen compiled a 4–2–2 record (3–2–1 against MIAA opponents) and finished in third place in the MIAA.

Center Robert Powers was named as a first-team player on the 1939 All-MIAA football team. Three Hope players were named to the second team: back Lee Brannock; guard Robert Hudson; and end Kenneth Honholt.

Date	Opponent	Site	Result	Source
September 22	Ferris Institute*	Holland, MI	W 18–6	
September 29	Grand Rapids*	Holland, MI	T 0–0	
October 6	Adrian	Holland, MI	W 31–0	
October 13	at Alma	Bahlke Field; Alma, MI	T 14–14	
October 20	Kalamazoo	Holland, MI	W 7–0	
October 28	at Olivet	Olivet, MI	W 27–0	
November 4	Hillsdale	Holland, MI	L 6–10	
November 11	at Albion	Alumni Field; Albion, MI	L 7–13	
*Non-conference game

=== Kalamazoo ===
1939 Kalamazoo Hornets football
- Conference: Michigan Intercollegiate Athletic Association
- Record: 3–5 (3–3 MIAA)
- Head coach: Chester S. Barnard (15th season)

The 1939 Kalamazoo Hornets football team represented Kalamazoo College of Kalamazoo, Michigan. In their 15th year under head coach Chester S. Barnard, the Hornets compiled a 3–5 record (3–3 against MIAA opponents) and finished in fourth place in the MIAA.

Two Kalamazoo players were selected as first-team players on the 1939 All-MIAA football team: back Dan Wood and tackle Paul Van Keuren. Two others were named to the second team: end Dick Lemer and tackle Ernest Wood.

Kalamazoo was ranked at No. 467 in the final Litkenhous Ratings for 1939.

Date	Opponent	Site	Result	Source
September 23	at Lake Forest*	Farwell Field; Lake Forest, IL	L 0–7	
September 30	at Olivet	Olivet, MI	W 21–6	
October 6	at Albion	Alumni Field; Albion, MI	L 0–7	
October 14	Hillsdale	Kalamazoo, MI	L 0–6	
October 20	at Hope	Holland, MI	L 0–7	
October 27	at Michigan State Normal*	Briggs Field; Ypsilanti, MI	L 6–19	
November 3	Alma	Kalamazoo, MI	W 7–6	
November 10	Adrian	Kalamazoo, MI	W 47–0	
*Non-conference game

=== Alma ===
1939 Alma Scots football
- Conference: Michigan Intercollegiate Athletic Association
- Record: 2–5–1 (2–3–1 MIAA)
- Head coach: Gordon MacDonald (4th season)
- Home stadium: Bahlke Field

The 1939 Alma Scots football team represented Alma College of Alma, Michigan. In their fourth year under head coach Gordon MacDonald, the Scots compiled a 2–5–1 record (2–3–1 against MIAA opponents) and finished in fifth place out of seven teams in the MIAA.

Back D. Smith and guard C. Barnett were selected as first-team players on the 1939 All-MIAA football team. Tackle E. Ziem and guard C. Hogerland were named to the second team.

Alma was ranked at No. 459 in the final Litkenhous Ratings for 1939.

Date	Opponent	Site	Result	Source
September 23	at Ohio Wesleyan	Delaware, OH	L 0–27	
September 29	Albion	Bahlke Field; Alma, MI	L 0–6	
October 7	at Olivet	Olivet, MI	W 37–7	
October 13	Hope	Bahlke Field; Alma, MI	T 14–14	
October 21	at Hillsdale	Hillsdale, MI	L 0–6	
October 27	Adrian	Alma, MI	W 31–0	
November 3	at Kalamazoo	Kalamazoo, MI	L 6–7	
November 10	at Michigan State Normal	Briggs Field; Ypsilanti, MI	L 6–16	

=== Adrian ===
1939 Adrian Bulldogs football
- Conference: Michigan Intercollegiate Athletic Association
- Record: 2–6 (1–5 MIAA)
- Head coach: Harve A. Oliphant (2nd season)

The 1939 Adrian Bulldogs football team represented Adrian College of Adrian, Michigan. In their second year under head coach Harve A. Oliphant, the Bulldogs compiled a 2–6 record (1–5 against MIAA opponents) and finished in sixth place out of seven teams in the MIAA.

Adrian was ranked at No. 609 in the final Litkenhous Ratings for 1939.

Date	Opponent	Site	Result	Source
September 22	at Assumption (ON)*	Windsor, ON	L 0–18	
September 30	Hillsdale	Adrian, MI	L 0–39	
October 6	at Hope	Holland, MI	L 0–31	
October 14	Albion	Adrian, MI	L 0–51	
October 21	Olivet	Adrian, MI	W 21–0	
October 27	at Alma	Alma, MI	L 0–31	
November 4	St. Mary's (MI)*	Adrian, MI	W 26–0	
November 10	at Kalamazoo	Kalamazoo, MI	L 0–47	
*Non-conference game

=== Olivet ===
1939 Olivet Comets football
- Conference: Michigan Intercollegiate Athletic Association
- Record: 1–7 (0–6 MIAA)
- Head coach: William Hemingway (4th season)

The 1939 Olivet Comets football team represented Olivet College of Olivet, Michigan. In their fourth and final year under head coach William Hemingway, the Comets compiled a 1–7 record (0–6 against MIAA opponents) and finished in last place out of seven teams in the MIAA.

Olivet was ranked at No. 607 in the final Litkenhous Ratings for 1939.

Date	Opponent	Site	Result	Source
September 22	at Grand Rapids*	Grand Rapids, MI	L 6–7	
September 30	Kalamazoo	Olivet, MI	L 6–21	
October 7	Alma	Olivet, MI	L 6–37	
October 14	vs. St. Mary's (MI)*	Pontiac, MI	W 31–0	
October 21	at Adrian	Adrian, MI	L 0–21	
October 28	Hope	Olivet, MI	L 0–27	
November 4	at Albion	Alumni Field; Albion, MI	L 0–39	
November 11	at Hillsdale	Hillsdale, MI	L 0–50	
*Non-conference game

== All-conference team ==
The following players were selected on the 1939 All-MIAA football team:

First team

- Backs - D. Smith, Alma; Bruce Coburn, Hillsdale; Dan Wood, Kalamazoo; Gordon Platt, Hillsdale
- Ends - Roland Larson, Hillsdale; Jack Nordling, Hillsdale
- Tackles - Max Schnitzler, Hillsdale; Paul Van Keuren, Kalamazoo
- Guards - Walter Ptak, Albion; C. Barnett, Alma
- Center - Robert Powers, Hope

Second team

- Backs - Lee Brannock, Hope; Elwood Linlow, Albion; Marion Diehl, Olivet; Archie Karowski, Hillsdale
- Ends - Dick Lemer, Kalamazoo; Kenneth Honholt, Hope
- Tackles - E. Ziem, Alma; Ernest Wood, Kalamazoo
- Guard - Robert Hudso, Hope; C. Hogerland, Alma
- Center - Fred Cook, Albion
