= Hope Flying Dutchmen football, 1940–1949 =

American college football seasons

1940–1942, 1946–1949 Hope Flying Dutchmen football
- Conference: Michigan Intercollegiate Athletic Association
- Head coach: Bud Hinga (1931–1942); Al Vanderbush (1946–1954)

The Hope Flying Tigers football program, 1940–1949 represented Hope College of Holland, Michigan, during the 1940s in college football as a member of the Michigan Intercollegiate Athletic Association (MIAA). The team was led by head coaches Bud Hinga (1931–1942) and Al Vanderbush (1946–1954). The football program was suspended from 1943 to 1945 due to World War II.

== 1940 ==
1940 Hope Flying Dutchmen football
- Conference: Michigan Intercollegiate Athletic Association
- Record: 3–3–1 (2–2–1 MIAA)
- Head coach: Bud Hinga (10th season)

1940 Michigan Intercollegiate Athletic Association football standings
	Conf.					Overall
Team	W		L		T	W		L		T
Albion $	5	–	0	–	0	7	–	1	–	0
Alma	4	–	1	–	0	5	–	2	–	0
Hope	2	–	2	–	1	3	–	3	–	1
Hillsdale	2	–	2	–	1	2	–	4	–	1
Adrian	1	–	4	–	0	1	–	7	–	0
Kalamazoo	0	–	5	–	0	1	–	6	–	1
$ – Conference champion

The 1940 Hope Flying Dutchmen football team represented Hope College of Hope, Michigan. In their 10th year under head coach Bud Hinga, the Dutchmen compiled a 3–3–1 record (2–2–1 against MIAA opponents) and finished in third place in the MIAA.

Hope was ranked at No. 443 (out of 697 college football teams) in the final rankings under the Litkenhous Difference by Score system for 1940.

Date	Opponent	Site	Result	Attendance	Source
September 20	Ferris Institute*	Holland, MI	W 35–0		
September 28	at Adrian	Adrian, MI	W 20–0		
October 4	Alma	Holland, MI	L 7–19		
October 12	at Kalamazoo	Kalamazoo, MI	W 7–0		
October 26	at Hillsdale	Hillsdale, MI	T 6–6		
November 2	Albion	Holland, MI	L 0–6	5,000	
November 9	Grand Rapids*	Holland, MI	L 6–10		
*Non-conference game

== 1941 ==
1941 Hope Flying Dutchmen football
- Conference: Michigan Intercollegiate Athletic Association
- Record: 3–2–3 (2–1–2 MIAA)
- Head coach: Bud Hinga (11th season)

1941 Michigan Intercollegiate Athletic Association football standings
	Conf.					Overall
Team	W		L		T	W		L		T
Alma $	4	–	0	–	1	6	–	0	–	1
Albion	3	–	1	–	1	3	–	4	–	1
Hope	2	–	1	–	2	3	–	2	–	3
Kalamazoo	2	–	2	–	1	5	–	2	–	1
Hillsdale	1	–	3	–	1	3	–	4	–	1
Adrian	0	–	5	–	0	2	–	6	–	0
$ – Conference champion

The 1941 Hope Flying Dutchmen football team represented Hope College of Hope, Michigan. In their 11th year under head coach Bud Hinga, the Dutchmen compiled a 3–2–3 record (2–1–2 against MIAA opponents), finished in third place in the MIAA, and were outscored by a total of 36 to 35.

Three Hope players were selected as first-team players on the 1941 All-Star M.I.A.A. football team: halfback Don Defouw; center William Tappen; and tackle Martin Bekken.

Hope was ranked at No. 501 (out of 681 teams) in the final rankings under the Litkenhous Difference by Score System.

Date	Opponent	Site	Result	Source
September 19	Grand Rapids*		W 10–0	
September 26	Michigan State Normal*	Holland, MI	T 0–0	
October 3	at Alma	Alma, MI	T 7–7	
October 17	Grand Rapids*	Holland, MI	L 0–16	
October 24	Hillsdale	Holland, MI	W 6–0	
November 1	at Albion	Alumni Field; Albion, MI	L 0–7	
November 8	Kalamazoo*	Holland, MI	T 6–6	
November 14	Adrian	Holland, MI	W 6–0	
*Non-conference game

== 1942 ==
1942 Hope Flying Dutchmen football
- Conference: Michigan Intercollegiate Athletic Association
- Record: 1–4–2 (1–3 MIAA)
- Head coach: Bud Hinga (12th season)

1942 Michigan Intercollegiate Athletic Association football standings
	Conf.					Overall
Team	W		L		T	W		L		T
Alma $	4	–	0	–	0	7	–	0	–	0
Kalamazoo	2	–	2	–	0	4	–	3	–	0
Albion	2	–	2	–	0	4	–	4	–	0
Hillsdale	1	–	3	–	0	3	–	5	–	0
Hope	1	–	3	–	0	1	–	4	–	2
$ – Conference champion

The 1942 Hope Flying Dutchmen football team represented Hope College during the 1942 college football season. In their 12th year under head coach Bud Hinga, the Flying Dutchmen compiled a 1–4–2 record (1–3 in MIAA games) and finished in a tie for last place out of five teams in the MIAA.

== Wartime suspension ==
In 1943, Hope lost many of its students to military service due to World War II. By July 1943, Hillsdale had announced that it would be unable to field a team, and Hope coach Hinga announced that Hope was waiting to see "if we have any boys" to field a team. In late September, Hinga announced that Hope was withdrawing from intercollegiate football due to the shortage of manpower. Hope was the tenth Michigan school to withdraw from competition. Hope did not field a team during the 1943, 1944, or 1945 seasons.

== 1946 ==
1946 Hope Flying Dutchmen football
- Conference: Michigan Intercollegiate Athletic Association
- Record: 6–2 (3–2 MIAA)
- Head coach: Al Vanderbush (1st season)

1946 Michigan Intercollegiate Athletic Association football standings
	Conf.					Overall
Team	W		L		T	W		L		T
Hillsdale +	4	–	1	–	0	7	–	1	–	0
Kalamazoo +	4	–	1	–	0	6	–	2	–	0
Hope	3	–	2	–	0	6	–	2	–	0
Albion	2	–	3	–	0	3	–	5	–	0
Alma	2	–	3	–	0	2	–	5	–	0
Adrian	0	–	5	–	0	0	–	8	–	0
+ – Conference co-champions

The 1946 Hope Flying Dutchmen football team represented Hope College of Hope, Michigan. In their first year under head coach Al Vanderbush, the Dutchmen compiled a 6–2 record (3–2 against MIAA opponents), finished in third place in the MIAA, shut out five of eight opponents, and outscored all opponents by a total of 160 to 40.

Two Hope players, quarterback Nick Yonker and end Dan Schriemer, were selected as first-team players on the 1946 All-Star M.I.A.A. football team. Yoner was a unanimous pick.

Date	Opponent	Site	Result	Attendance	Source
September 20	Ferris Institute*	Holland, MI	W 38–6		
September 27	at Albion	Albion, MI	W 26–0		
October 4	Michigan State Normal*	Holland, MI	W 13–0		
October 10	at Grand Rapids*	Grand Rapids, MI	W 20–0		
October 19	at Kalamazoo	Kalamazoo, MI	L 0–13	5,500	
October 26	Alma^{†}	Holland, MI	W 24–0	6,000	
November 2	at Adrian	Adrian, MI	W 19–0		
November 16	at Hillsdale	Hillsdale, MI	L 20–21		
*Non-conference game; ^{†}Homecoming

== 1947 ==
1947 Hope Flying Dutchmen football
- Conference: Michigan Intercollegiate Athletic Association
- Record: 5–2–1 (3–1–1 MIAA)
- Head coach: Al Vanderbush (2nd season)

1947 Michigan Intercollegiate Athletic Association football standings
	Conf.					Overall
Team	W		L		T	W		L		T
Hillsdale +	3	–	0	–	2	7	–	0	–	2
Kalamazoo +	3	–	0	–	2	4	–	1	–	3
Hope	3	–	1	–	1	5	–	2	–	1
Alma	2	–	2	–	1	5	–	3	–	1
Adrian	1	–	4	–	0	3	–	5	–	0
Albion	0	–	5	–	0	0	–	8	–	0
+ – Conference co-champions

The 1947 Hope Flying Dutchmen football team represented Hope College during the 1947 college football season. In their second year under head coach Al Vanderbush, the Flying Dutchmen compiled a 5–2–1 record (3–1–1 in conference games) and finished in third place in the MIAA.

== 1948 ==
1948 Hope Flying Dutchmen football
- Conference: Michigan Intercollegiate Athletic Association
- Record: 5–3 (2–3 MIAA)
- Head coach: Al Vanderbush (3rd season)

1948 Michigan Intercollegiate Athletic Association football standings
	Conf.					Overall
Team	W		L		T	W		L		T
Alma $	5	–	0	–	0	8	–	0	–	0
Kalamazoo	3	–	1	–	1	4	–	4	–	1
Hillsdale	2	–	2	–	1	6	–	2	–	1
Hope	2	–	3	–	0	5	–	3	–	0
Adrian	2	–	3	–	0	5	–	4	–	0
Albion	0	–	5	–	0	2	–	6	–	0
$ – Conference champion

The 1948 Hope Flying Dutchmen football team represented Hope College during the 1948 college football season. In their third year under head coach Al Vanderbush, the Flying Dutchmen compiled a 5–3 record (2–3 in conference games) and finished in a tie for fourth place in the MIAA.

Date	Opponent	Site	Result	Attendance	Source
September 24	Michigan State Normal*	Holland, MI	W 13–0		
	Monmouth*	Holland, MI	W 13–7		
	Adrian	Holland, MI	L 13–14		
	Hillsdale	Holland, MI	W 7–0		
	Grand Rapids JC*	Holland, MI	W 32–13		
	Albion	Holland, MI	W 33–6		
	at Kalamazoo	Kalamazoo, MI	L 7–9		
November 13	Alma	Holland, MI	L 13–25		
*Non-conference game

== 1949 ==
1949 Hope Flying Dutchmen football
- Conference: Michigan Intercollegiate Athletic Association
- Record: 7–1 (4–1 MIAA)
- Head coach: Al Vanderbush (4th season)

1949 Michigan Intercollegiate Athletic Association football standings
	Conf.					Overall
Team	W		L		T	W		L		T
Hillsdale $	5	–	0	–	0	9	–	1	–	0
Hope	4	–	1	–	0	7	–	1	–	0
Alma	2	–	2	–	1	5	–	2	–	1
Adrian	2	–	2	–	1	4	–	3	–	1
Kalamazoo	1	–	4	–	0	2	–	6	–	0
Albion	0	–	5	–	0	2	–	6	–	1
$ – Conference champion

The 1949 Hope Flying Dutchmen football team represented Hope College during the 1949 college football season. In their fourth year under head coach Al Vanderbush, the Dutchmen compiled a 7–1 record (4–1 in conference games) and finished in second place in the MIAA.
