= Hope Flying Dutchmen football, 1930–1939 =

American college football seasons

1930–1939 Hope Flying Dutchmen football
- Conference: Michigan Intercollegiate Athletic Association
- Head coach: Jack Schouten (1917, 1920–1930); Bud Hinga (1931–1942)

The Hope Flying Tigers football program, 1930–1939 represented Hope College of Holland, Michigan, during the 1930s in college football as a member of the Michigan Intercollegiate Athletic Association (MIAA). The program was led by head coaches Jack Schouten (1917, 1920–1930) and Bud Hinga (1931–1942). The 1934 team tied with Kalamazoo for the MIAA championship, Hope's only championship during the 1930s.

== 1930 ==
1930 Hope Flying Dutchmen football
- Conference: Michigan Intercollegiate Athletic Association
- Record: 0–6 (0–5 MIAA)
- Head coach: Jack Schouten (12th season)

1930 Michigan Intercollegiate Athletic Association football standings
	Conf.					Overall
Team	W		L		T	W		L		T
Alma +	4	–	1	–	0	5	–	3	–	0
Kalamazoo +	4	–	1	–	0	5	–	3	–	0
Hillsdale	3	–	2	–	0	5	–	3	–	0
Albion	3	–	2	–	0	4	–	4	–	0
Olivet	1	–	4	–	0	3	–	4	–	1
Hope	0	–	5	–	0	0	–	6	–	0
+ – Conference co-champions

The 1930 Hope Flying Dutchmen football team represented Hope College during the 1930 college football season. In their twelfth and final year under head coach Jack Schouten, the Flying Dutchmen compiled a 0–6 record (0–5 in MIAA games) and finished in last place out of six games in the MIAA.

== 1931 ==
1931 Hope Flying Dutchmen football
- Conference: Michigan Intercollegiate Athletic Association
- Record: 3–4–1 (1–3–1 MIAA)
- Head coach: Bud Hinga (1st season)

1931 Michigan Intercollegiate Athletic Association football standings
	Conf.					Overall
Team	W		L		T	W		L		T
Hillsdale $	3	–	0	–	2	6	–	0	–	2
Alma	3	–	1	–	1	3	–	3	–	1
Olivet	2	–	2	–	0	5	–	3	–	0
Kalamazoo	2	–	3	–	0	5	–	4	–	0
Hope	1	–	3	–	1	3	–	4	–	1
Albion	1	–	3	–	0	3	–	4	–	0
$ – Conference champion

The 1931 Hope Flying Dutchmen football team represented Hope College during the 1931 college football season. In their first year under head coach Bud Hinga, the Flying Dutchmen compiled a 3–4–1 record (1–3–1 in MIAA games) and finished in fifth place out of six games in the MIAA.

== 1932 ==
1932 Hope Flying Dutchmen football
- Conference: Michigan Intercollegiate Athletic Association
- Record: 4–2–2 (1–1–2 MIAA)
- Head coach: Bud Hinga (2nd season)

1932 Michigan Intercollegiate Athletic Association football standings
	Conf.					Overall
Team	W		L		T	W		L		T
Hillsdale $	4	–	0	–	0	7	–	1	–	0
Albion	2	–	1	–	1	4	–	2	–	1
Hope	1	–	1	–	2	4	–	2	–	2
Kalamazoo	1	–	2	–	1	4	–	3	–	1
Alma	0	–	4	–	0	1	–	6	–	0
$ – Conference champion

The 1932 Hope Flying Dutchmen football team represented Hope College during the 1932 college football season. In their second year under head coach Bud Hinga, the Flying Dutchmen compiled a 4–2–2 record (1–1–2 in MIAA games) and finished in third place in the MIAA.

== 1933 ==
1933 Hope Flying Dutchmen football
- Conference: Michigan Intercollegiate Athletic Association
- Record: 3–2–2 (1–1–2 MIAA)
- Head coach: Bud Hinga (3rd season)

1933 Michigan Intercollegiate Athletic Association football standings
	Conf.					Overall
Team	W		L		T	W		L		T
Hillsdale $	4	–	0	–	0	6	–	0	–	2
Hope	1	–	1	–	2	3	–	2	–	2
Kalamazoo	1	–	1	–	2	3	–	2	–	2
Albion	0	–	2	–	2	1	–	3	–	2
Alma	0	–	2	–	2	0	–	4	–	2
$ – Conference champion

The 1933 Hope Flying Dutchmen football team represented Hope College during the 1933 college football season. In their third year under head coach Bud Hinga, the Flying Dutchmen compiled a 3–2–2 record (1–1–2 in MIAA games) and tied with Kalamazoo for second place in the MIAA.

=== Schedule ===
Date	Opponent	Site	Result	Attendance	Source
	Ferris Institute*	Holland, MI	W 26–0		
	Grand Rapids JC*	Holland, MI	W 19–0		
	Alma	Holland, MI	W 19–12		
	at Albion		T 0–0		
	at Kalamazoo	Kalamazoo, MI	T 0–0		
	at Detroit City*	Kelsey Field; Detroit, MI	L 0–3		
	Hillsdale	Holland, MI	L 0–13		
*Non-conference game

== 1934 ==
1934 Hope Flying Dutchmen football

MIAA co-champion
- Conference: Michigan Intercollegiate Athletic Association
- Record: 3–2–2 (2–1–1 MIAA)
- Head coach: Bud Hinga (4th season)

1934 Michigan Intercollegiate Athletic Association football standings
	Conf.					Overall
Team	W		L		T	W		L		T
Kalamazoo +	2	–	1	–	1	3	–	3	–	1
Hope +	2	–	1	–	1	3	–	2	–	2
Alma	1	–	1	–	2	1	–	4	–	2
Albion	1	–	2	–	1	3	–	4	–	1
Hillsdale	1	–	2	–	1	2	–	5	–	1
$ – Conference champion

The 1934 Hope Flying Dutchmen football team represented Hope College during the 1934 college football season. In their fourth year under head coach Bud Hinga, the Flying Dutchmen compiled a 3–2–2 record (2–1–1 in MIAA games) and tied with Kalamazoo for the MIAA championship.

=== Schedule ===
Date	Opponent	Site	Result	Attendance	Source
September 28	Ferris Institute*	Holland, MI	W 6–0		
October 6	at Alma	Alma, MI	T 6–6		
October 13	Grand Rapids JC*	Holland, MI	T 0–0		
October 20	Albion	Holland, MI	W 13–2		
October 27	Kalamazoo	Holland, MI	L 0–6		
November 3	at Hillsdale	Hillsdale, MI	W 14–6	2,000	
November 10	Wayne State*	Holland, MI	L 7–12		
*Non-conference game

== 1935 ==
1935 Hope Flying Dutchmen football
- Conference: Michigan Intercollegiate Athletic Association
- Record: 3–3–2 (1–2–1 MIAA)
- Head coach: Bud Hinga (5th season)

1935 Michigan Intercollegiate Athletic Association football standings
	Conf.					Overall
Team	W		L		T	W		L		T
Alma $	4	–	0	–	0	8	–	0	–	0
Kalamazoo	2	–	1	–	1	2	–	3	–	2
Hillsdale	1	–	2	–	1	4	–	4	–	1
Hope	1	–	2	–	1	3	–	3	–	2
Albion	0	–	3	–	1	0	–	6	–	2
$ – Conference champion

The 1935 Hope Flying Dutchmen football team represented Hope College during the 1935 college football season. In their fifth year under head coach Bud Hinga, the Flying Dutchmen compiled a 3–3–2 record (1–2–1 in MIAA games) and tied with Hillsdale for third place in the MIAA. The Hope yearbook described the 1935 season as "an average one" with "plenty of beef and a brawny line" but lacking "an effective running game."

=== Schedule ===
Date	Opponent	Site	Result	Attendance	Source
	Ferris*		W 7–6		
October 5	Alma	Holland, MI	L 0–13		
	Grand Rapids Junior College*		W 13–0		
	Kalamazoo		L 0–20		
	Hillsdale^{†}		W 6–0		
	Albion		T 0–0		
November 9	at Wayne*	Kelsey Field; Detroit, MI	L 0–16		
November 16	Michigan State Normal*	Holland, MI	T 7–7		
*Non-conference game; ^{†}Homecoming

== 1936 ==
1936 Hope Flying Dutchmen football
- Conference: Michigan Intercollegiate Athletic Association
- Record: 5–2–1 (5–2–1 MIAA)
- Head coach: Bud Hinga (6th season)

1936 Michigan Intercollegiate Athletic Association football standings
	Conf.					Overall
Team	W		L		T	W		L		T
Kalamazoo $	7	–	0	–	1	7	–	0	–	1
Alma	5	–	2	–	1	5	–	2	–	1
Hope	5	–	2	–	1	5	–	2	–	1
Albion	2	–	4	–	2	2	–	5	–	2
Hillsdale	2	–	5	–	1	4	–	5	–	1
Olivet	0	–	8	–	0	0	–	8	–	0
$ – Conference champion

The 1936 Hope Flying Dutchmen football team represented Hope College during the 1936 college football season. In their sixth year under head coach Bud Hinga, the Flying Dutchmen compiled a 5–2–1 record (5–2–1 in MIAA games) and tied with Alma for second place in the MIAA.

=== Schedule ===
Date	Opponent	Site	Result	Attendance	Source
	Olivet		W 26–6		
	at Albion		W 6–0		
	vs. Hillsdale		T 0–0		
	Kalamazoo		L 7–13		
	Alma		W 12–7		
	at Olivet		W 13–0		
	Albion		W 6–0		

== 1937 ==
1937 Hope Flying Dutchmen football
- Conference: Michigan Intercollegiate Athletic Association
- Record: 3–4–1 (1–3 MIAA)
- Head coach: Bud Hinga (7th season)

1937 Michigan Intercollegiate Athletic Association football standings
	Conf.					Overall
Team	W		L		T	W		L		T
Kalamazoo $	4	–	0	–	0	7	–	1	–	0
Alma	2	–	2	–	0	4	–	4	–	1
Hillsdale	2	–	2	–	0	3	–	6	–	0
Albion	1	–	3	–	0	4	–	4	–	0
Hope	1	–	3	–	0	3	–	4	–	1
$ – Conference champion

The 1937 Hope Flying Dutchmen football team represented Hope College during the 1937 college football season. In their seventh year under head coach Bud Hinga, the Flying Dutchmen compiled a 3–4–1 record (1–3 in MIAA games) and tied with Albion for last place out of five teams in the MIAA.

== 1938 ==
1938 Hope Flying Dutchmen football
- Conference: Michigan Intercollegiate Athletic Association
- Record: 4–3–1 (0–3–1 MIAA)
- Head coach: Bud Hinga (8th season)

1938 Michigan Intercollegiate Athletic Association football standings
	Conf.					Overall
Team	W		L		T	W		L		T
Hillsdale $	4	–	0	–	0	8	–	0	–	0
Albion	2	–	1	–	1	5	–	2	–	1
Kalamazoo	1	–	2	–	1	3	–	4	–	1
Alma	1	–	2	–	1	3	–	5	–	1
Hope	0	–	3	–	1	4	–	3	–	1
$ – Conference champion

The 1938 Hope Flying Dutchmen football team represented Hope College during the 1938 college football season. In their eighth year under head coach Bud Hinga, the Dutchmen compiled a 4–3–1 record (0–3–1 in MIAA games) and finished in last place out of five teams in the MIAA.

=== Schedule ===
Date	Opponent	Site	Result	Attendance	Source
September 23	Ferris Institute*	Riverview Park; Holland, MI	W 20–0		
September 30	Albion	Riverview Park; Holland, MI	L 0–3		
October 7	Grand Rapids JC*	Riverview Park; Holland, MI	W 24–14	2,500	
October 15	at Adrian*	Adrian, MI	W 22–6		
October 22	Alma	Holland, MI	L 7–13		
October 29	at Kalamazoo	Angell Field; Kalamazoo, MI	T 7–7		
November 4	Olivet*	Holland, MI	W 32–12		
November 12	at Hillsdale	Hillsdale, MI	L 0–33		
*Non-conference game

== 1939 ==
1939 Hope Flying Dutchmen football
- Conference: Michigan Intercollegiate Athletic Association
- Record: 4–2–2 (3–2–1 MIAA)
- Head coach: Bud Hinga (9th season)

1939 Michigan Intercollegiate Athletic Association football standings
	Conf.					Overall
Team	W		L		T	W		L		T
Albion $	6	–	0	–	0	7	–	1	–	0
Hillsdale	5	–	1	–	0	6	–	1	–	0
Hope	3	–	2	–	1	4	–	2	–	2
Kalamazoo	3	–	3	–	0	3	–	5	–	0
Alma	2	–	3	–	1	2	–	5	–	1
Adrian	1	–	5	–	0	2	–	6	–	0
Olivet	0	–	6	–	0	1	–	7	–	0
$ – Conference champion

The 1939 Hope Flying Dutchmen football team represented Hope College during the 1939 college football season. In their ninth year under head coach Bud Hinga, the Flying Dutchmen compiled a 4–2–2 record (3–2–1 against MIAA opponents) and finished in third place in the MIAA.

Center Robert Powers was named as a first-team player on the 1939 All-MIAA football team. Three Hope players were named to the second team: back Lee Brannock; guard Robert Hudson; and end Kenneth Honholt.

=== Schedule ===
Date	Opponent	Site	Result	Source
September 22	Ferris Institute*	Holland, MI	W 18–6	
September 29	Grand Rapids*	Holland, MI	T 0–0	
October 6	Adrian	Holland, MI	W 31–0	
October 13	at Alma	Bahlke Field; Alma, MI	T 14–14	
October 20	Kalamazoo	Holland, MI	W 7–0	
October 28	at Olivet	Olivet, MI	W 27–0	
November 4	Hillsdale	Holland, MI	L 6–10	
November 11	at Albion	Alumni Field; Albion, MI	L 7–13	
*Non-conference game
