= Gordon MacDonald =

Gordon MacDonald may refer to:

- Gordon MacDonald (Alberta politician) (1866–1941), member of the Legislative Assembly of Alberta
- Gordon MacDonald (Scottish politician) (born 1960), Member of the Scottish Parliament
- Gordon Macdonald, 1st Baron Macdonald of Gwaenysgor (1885–1966), British Labour Party politician and Newfoundland's final British governor
- Gordon A. Macdonald (1911–1978), American volcanologist
- Gordon J. F. MacDonald (1929–2002), geophysicist and environmental scientist
- Gordon J. MacDonald (born 1961), Chief Justice of the New Hampshire Supreme Court
- Gordon MacDonald (American football) (1902–1950), American football and basketball player and coach
- Gordon MacDonald (editor) (born 1967), British educator and magazine editor
- Gordon Macdonald (rugby union), Scottish international rugby union player
- Gordon MacDonald, actor and partner of American actress Holly Hunter
