= Hope Flying Dutchmen football, 1950–1959 =

American college football seasons

1950–1959 Hope Flying Dutchmen football
- Conference: Michigan Intercollegiate Athletic Association
- Head coach: Al Vanderbush (1946–1954); Russ DeVette (1955–1969)

The Hope Flying Tigers football program, 1950–1959 represented Hope College of Holland, Michigan, from 1950 to 1959 in college football as a member of the Michigan Intercollegiate Athletic Association (MIAA). The team was led by head coaches Al Vanderbush (1946–1954) and Russ DeVette (1955–1969).

== 1950 ==
1950 Hope Flying Dutchmen football
- Conference: Michigan Intercollegiate Athletic Association
- Record: 4–3–1 (2–2–1 MIAA)
- Head coach: Al Vanderbush (5th season)

1950 Michigan Intercollegiate Athletic Association football standings
	Conf.					Overall
Team	W		L		T	W		L		T
Alma $	4	–	0	–	1	6	–	2	–	1
Kalamazoo	4	–	1	–	0	5	–	4	–	0
Albion	2	–	2	–	1	6	–	2	–	1
Hope	2	–	2	–	1	4	–	3	–	1
Hillsdale	1	–	3	–	1	2	–	6	–	1
Adrian	0	–	5	–	0	2	–	6	–	0
$ – Conference champion

The 1950 Hope Flying Dutchmen football team represented Hope College of Holland, Michigan, during the 1950 college football season. In their fifth year under head coach Al Vanderbush, the Flying Dutchmen compiled a 4–3–1 record (2–2–1 in MIAA games) and tied for third place in the MIAA.

== 1951 ==
1951 Hope Flying Dutchmen football
- Conference: Michigan Intercollegiate Athletic Association
- Record: 5–4 (4–1 MIAA)
- Head coach: Al Vanderbush (6th season)

1951 Michigan Intercollegiate Athletic Association football standings
	Conf.					Overall
Team	W		L		T	W		L		T
Alma +	4	–	1	–	0	7	–	2	–	0
Hope +	4	–	1	–	0	5	–	4	–	0
Albion	3	–	2	–	0	6	–	2	–	0
Hillsdale	2	–	3	–	0	2	–	6	–	0
Kalamazoo	2	–	3	–	0	2	–	6	–	0
Adrian	0	–	5	–	0	0	–	6	–	0
+ – Conference co-champions

The 1951 Hope Flying Dutchmen football team represented Hope College of Holland, Michigan, during the 1951 college football season. In their sixth year under head coach Al Vanderbush, the Flying Dutchmen compiled a 5–4 record (4–1 in MIAA games) and finished in second place in the MIAA.

== 1952 ==
1952 Hope Flying Dutchmen football
- Conference: Michigan Intercollegiate Athletic Association
- Record: 4–5 (4–1 MIAA)
- Head coach: Al Vanderbush (7th season)

1952 Michigan Intercollegiate Athletic Association football standings
	Conf.					Overall
Team	W		L		T	W		L		T
Albion $	5	–	0	–	0	7	–	1	–	0
Hope	4	–	1	–	0	4	–	5	–	0
Alma	2	–	3	–	0	4	–	4	–	0
Kalamazoo	2	–	3	–	0	3	–	4	–	1
Adrian	1	–	4	–	0	3	–	5	–	1
Hillsdale	1	–	4	–	0	3	–	5	–	0
$ – Conference champion

The 1952 Hope Flying Dutchmen football team represented Hope College of Holland, Michigan, during the 1952 college football season. In their seventh year under head coach Al Vanderbush, the Flying Dutchmen compiled a 4–5 record (4–1 in MIAA games) and finished in second place in the MIAA.

=== Schedule ===
Date	Opponent	Site	Result	Attendance	Source
September 6	Michigan State Normal*	Holland, MI	L 6–13		
September 13	Beloit*	Holland, MI	L 0–14		
September 20	Carroll*	Holland, MI	L 21–27		
September 27	Hillsdale	Holland, MI	W 33–0		
October 4	Albion	Holland, MI	L 13–32		
October 11	DePauw*	Holland, MI	L 0–34		
October 18	at Kalamazoo	Kalamazoo, MI	W 30–14		
October 25	Alma	Holland, MI	W 6–0		
November 1	Adrian	Holland, MI	W 20–6		
*Non-conference game

== 1953 ==
1953 Hope Flying Dutchmen football
- Standing: backs Adams, Voss, Kempker, Talarico; Crouching (from left): linemen Brannock, Heydorn, Nienhuis, Prins, Vander Toll, Hollander, Van Hoeven

MIAA champion
- Conference: Michigan Intercollegiate Athletic Association
- Record: 7–2 (5–1 MIAA)
- Head coach: Al Vanderbush (8th season)
- MVP: Jim Van Hoeven
- Home stadium: Riverview Park

1953 Michigan Intercollegiate Athletic Association football standings
	Conf.					Overall
Team	W		L		T	W		L		T
Hope $	5	–	1	–	0	7	–	2	–	0
Albion	4	–	1	–	1	5	–	2	–	1
Alma	4	–	2	–	0	7	–	2	–	0
Hillsdale	3	–	1	–	2	4	–	2	–	2
Olivet	2	–	4	–	0	4	–	5	–	0
Adrian	1	–	4	–	1	2	–	5	–	1
Kalamazoo	0	–	6	–	0	1	–	7	–	0
$ – Conference champion

The 1953 Hope Flying Dutchmen football team represented Hope College of Holland, Michigan, during the 1953 college football season. In their eighth year under head coach Al Vanderbush, the Flying Dutchmen compiled a 7–2 record (5–1 in MIAA games) and won the MIAA championship. It was Hope's first undisputed conference championship.

The team's assistant coaches were Weller (line) and Russ DeVette (backfield).

Four Hope players were named to the all-conference team: halfback John Adams; quarterback Frank Talarico; end Jim Van Hoeven; and tackle Bill Heydorn. Van Hoeven was selected as the team's most valuable player.

=== Schedule ===
Date	Opponent	Site	Result	Attendance	Source
September 19	Michigan Normal*	Riverview Park; Holland, MI	L 6–21		
September 25	Olivet	Riverview Park; Holland, MI	W 25–0		
October 3	Carroll*	Riverview Park; Holland, MI	W 21–14		
October 10	at Adrian	Adrian, MI	W 20–7		
October 17	Hillsdale^{†}	Riverview Park; Holland, MI	W 28–7	3,500	
October 24	at Beloit*	Beloit, WI	W 32–13		
October 31	at Albion	Albion, MI	W 20–7		
November 7	Kalamazoo	Riverview Park; Holland, MI	W 12–7		
November 14	at Alma	Bahlke Field; Alma, MI	L 19–33		
*Non-conference game; ^{†}Homecoming

== 1954 ==
1954 Hope Flying Dutchmen football
- Conference: Michigan Intercollegiate Athletic Association
- Record: 3–6 (3–3 MIAA)
- Head coach: Al Vanderbush (9th season)

1954 Michigan Intercollegiate Athletic Association football standings
	Conf.					Overall
Team	W		L		T	W		L		T
Hillsdale $	6	–	0	–	0	7	–	1	–	1
Kalamazoo	4	–	2	–	0	6	–	2	–	0
Albion	4	–	2	–	0	5	–	3	–	0
Hope	3	–	3	–	0	3	–	6	–	0
Alma	2	–	4	–	0	6	–	4	–	0
Adrian	1	–	5	–	0	2	–	7	–	0
Olivet	1	–	5	–	0	1	–	7	–	1
$ – Conference champion

The 1954 Hope Flying Dutchmen football team represented Hope College of Holland, Michigan, during the 1954 college football season. In their ninth and final year under head coach Al Vanderbush, the Flying Dutchmen compiled a 3–6 record (3–3 in MIAA games) and finished in fourth place in the MIAA.

== 1955 ==
1955 Hope Flying Dutchmen football
- Conference: Michigan Intercollegiate Athletic Association
- Record: 4–5 (3–3 MIAA)
- Head coach: Russ DeVette (1st season)

1955 Michigan Intercollegiate Athletic Association football standings
	Conf.					Overall
Team	W		L		T	W		L		T
Hillsdale $	6	–	0	–	0	9	–	0	–	0
Kalamazoo	4	–	2	–	0	5	–	3	–	0
Alma	3	–	3	–	0	5	–	4	–	0
Hope	3	–	3	–	0	4	–	5	–	0
Albion	3	–	3	–	0	3	–	5	–	0
Adrian	2	–	4	–	0	4	–	5	–	0
Olivet	0	–	6	–	0	1	–	8	–	0
$ – Conference champion

The 1955 Hope Flying Dutchmen football team represented Hope College during the 1955 college football season. In their first year under head coach Russ DeVette, the Flying Dutchmen compiled a 4–5 record (3–3 in MIAA games), finished in a tie for third place in the MIAA, and outscored opponents by a total of 187 to 158.

=== Schedule ===
Date	Opponent	Site	Result	Attendance	Source
September 17	at Michigan State Normal*	Briggs Field; Ypsilanti, MI	L 0–27		
September 24	Heidelberg*	Holland, MI	L 6–28		
October 1	Carroll*	Holland, MI	W 19–13		
October 8	Kalamazoo	Holland, MI	L 7–20		
October 15	at Adrian	Adrian, MI	L 13–18		
October 22	Hillsdale	Holland, MI	L 13–19		
October 29	at Olivet	Olivet, MI	W 52–13		
November 5	at Albion	Holland, MI	W 40–6	1,900	
November 12	at Alma	Alma, MI	W 37–14		
*Non-conference game

== 1956 ==
1956 Hope Flying Dutchmen football
- Conference: Michigan Intercollegiate Athletic Association
- Record: 4–4 (4–2 MIAA)
- Head coach: Russ DeVette (2nd season)

1956 Michigan Intercollegiate Athletic Association football standings
	Conf.					Overall
Team	W		L		T	W		L		T
Hillsdale $	6	–	0	–	0	9	–	0	–	0
Kalamazoo	5	–	1	–	0	5	–	3	–	0
Hope	4	–	2	–	0	4	–	4	–	0
Albion	3	–	3	–	0	3	–	5	–	0
Adrian	2	–	4	–	0	3	–	5	–	0
Alma	1	–	5	–	0	2	–	7	–	0
Olivet	0	–	6	–	0	0	–	8	–	0
$ – Conference champion

The 1956 Hope Flying Dutchmen football team represented Hope College of Holland, Michigan during the 1956 college football season. In their second year under head coach Russ DeVette, the Flying Dutchmen compiled a 4–4 record (4–2 in MIAA games) and finished in third place in the MIAA.

=== Schedule ===
Date	Opponent	Site	Result	Attendance	Source
September 1	Heidelberg*	Holland, MI	L 12–41		
September 8	Wabash*	Holland, MI	L 7–40		
September 15	at Kalamazoo	Kalamazoo, MI	L 18–20		
September 22	Adrian	Holland, MI	W 25–7		
September 29	Hillsdale	Holland, MI	L 14–34		
October 6	Olivet	Holland, MI	W 59–6		
October 13	at Albion	Albion, MI	W 18–13		
October 20	at Alma	Holland, MI	W 25–20		
*Non-conference game

== 1957 ==
1957 Hope Flying Dutchmen football
- Conference: Michigan Intercollegiate Athletic Association
- Record: 7–2 (4–2 MIAA)
- Head coach: Russ DeVette (3rd season)

1957 Michigan Intercollegiate Athletic Association football standings
	Conf.					Overall
Team	W		L		T	W		L		T
Hillsdale $^	6	–	0	–	0	9	–	1	–	0
Hope	4	–	2	–	0	7	–	2	–	0
Albion	4	–	2	–	0	5	–	3	–	0
Alma	3	–	2	–	1	5	–	2	–	2
Kalamazoo	2	–	3	–	1	2	–	5	–	1
Adrian	1	–	5	–	0	3	–	5	–	0
Olivet	0	–	6	–	0	0	–	9	–	0
$ – Conference champion; ^ – NAIA playoff participant

The 1957 Hope Flying Dutchmen football team represented Hope College of Holland, Michigan during the 1957 college football season. In their third year under head coach Russ DeVette, the Flying Dutchmen compiled a 7–2 record (4–2 in MIAA games) and finished in second place in the MIAA.

=== Schedule ===
Date	Opponent	Site	Result	Attendance	Source
September 21	Eastern Michigan	Briggs Field; Ypsilanti, MI	W 19–6		
September 28	at Alma	Alma, MI	L 13–14		
October 5	at Northern Michigan*	Marquette, MI	W 14–13		
October 12	Kalamazoo	Holland, MI	W 14–0		
October 19	at Adrian	Adrian, MI	W 14–0		
October 26	Hillsdale	Holland, MI	L 6–7		
November 2	at Olivet	Olivet, MI	W 28–7		
November 9	Albion	Holland, MI	W 47–7		
November 16	Beloit	Holland, MI	W 21–0		
*Non-conference game

== 1958 ==
1958 Hope Flying Dutchmen football

MIAA co-champion
- Conference: Michigan Intercollegiate Athletic Association
- Record: 8–1 (5–1 MIAA)
- Head coach: Russ DeVette (4th season)

1958 Michigan Intercollegiate Athletic Association football standings
	Conf.					Overall
Team	W		L		T	W		L		T
Hope +	5	–	1	–	0	8	–	1	–	0
Hillsdale +	5	–	1	–	0	7	–	2	–	0
Albion +	5	–	1	–	0	6	–	2	–	0
Alma	3	–	3	–	0	5	–	3	–	0
Adrian	2	–	4	–	0	3	–	5	–	0
Olivet	1	–	5	–	0	1	–	8	–	0
Kalamazoo	0	–	6	–	0	0	–	8	–	0
+ – Conference co-champions

The 1958 Hope Flying Dutchmen football team represented Hope College of Holland, Michigan during the 1958 college football season. In their fourth year under head coach Russ DeVette, the Flying Dutchmen compiled an 8–1 record (5–1 in MIAA games) and tied with Hillsdale for the MIAA championship.

Tackle Larry TerMolen won all-conference and Little All-America honors and was selected as the team's most valuable player. Other Hope players winning all-conference honors were guard Dan Paarlberg and fullback Ron Bekius.

=== Schedule ===
Date	Opponent	Site	Result	Attendance	Source
September 19	at Eastern Michigan*	Ypsilanti, MI	W 19–7		
September 27	Alma	Holland, MI	W 32–12		
October 4	Northern Michigan*	Holland, MI	W 14–13		
October 11	at Kalamazoo	Kalamazoo, MI	W 27–0		
October 18	Adrian	Holland, MI	W 41–7		
October 25	at Hillsdale	Hillsdale, MI	W 16–13		
October 31	Olivet	Holland, MI	W 61–0		
November 8	at Albion	Albion, MI	L 13–18		
November 15	at Beloit*	Beloiot, Wi	W 26–6		
*Non-conference game

== 1959 ==
1959 Hope Flying Dutchmen football
- Conference: Michigan Intercollegiate Athletic Association
- Record: 8–1 (5–1 MIAA)
- Head coach: Russ DeVette (5th season)

1959 Michigan Intercollegiate Athletic Association football standings
	Conf.					Overall
Team	W		L		T	W		L		T
No. 3 Hillsdale $^	6	–	0	–	0	8	–	2	–	0
Hope	5	–	1	–	0	8	–	1	–	0
Alma	4	–	2	–	0	5	–	4	–	0
Albion	3	–	3	–	0	4	–	4	–	0
Olivet	1	–	5	–	0	3	–	5	–	0
Adrian	1	–	5	–	0	2	–	6	–	0
Kalamazoo	1	–	5	–	0	2	–	6	–	0
$ – Conference champion; ^ – NAIA playoff participant; Rankings from NAIA poll

The 1959 Hope Flying Dutchmen football team represented Hope College of Holland, Michigan during the 1959 college football season. In their fifth year under head coach Russ DeVette, the Flying Dutchmen compiled an 8–1 record (5–1 in MIAA games) and finished in second place in the MIAA.

=== Schedule ===
Date	Opponent	Site	Result	Attendance	Source
September 19	at DePauw	Greencastle, IN	W 20–7		
September 26	Albion	Holland, MI	W 7–0	4,300	
October 3	at Alma	Alma, MI	W 13–7		
October 10	Wabash	Holland, MI	W 19–13		
October 17	Kalamazoo	Holland, MI	W 41–6		
October 24	at Adrian	Adrian, MI	W 20–0		
October 31	Hillsdale	Holland, MI	L 7–35	6,000	
November 7	at Olivet	Olivet, MI	W 42–0		
November 14	Ohio Northern	Holland, MI	W 32–6		
