= Alger H. Wood =

American football and basketball coach

Biographical details
- Born: 1891; St. Louis, Michigan, U.S.
- Died: 1970 (aged 78–79); Detroit, Michigan, U.S.

Coaching career (HC unless noted)

Football
- 1916: Doane
- 1919: Alma

Basketball
- 1916–1917: Doane
- 1918–1920: Alma

Head coaching record
- Overall: 5–11 (football); 19–27 (basketball)

Alger Hutchinson Wood (1891–1970) was an American football and basketball coach. Wood served as the head football coach at Doane College in 1917 and at Alma College in 1919, compiling a career college football coaching record of 5–11. Wood was also the head basketball coach at Doane in 1916–17 and Alma from 1918 to 1920, tallying a career college basketball mark of 19–27.

== Coaching career ==
=== Doane ===
Wood was the 17th head football coach at Doane College in Crete, Nebraska and he held that position for the 1916 season. His coaching record at Doane was 2–6.

=== Alma ===
In 1919, Wood was named the head football coach at Alma College in Alma, Michigan. He held that position for the 1919 season. His coaching record at Alma was 3–5.
