= Steve Sebo =

American sports player and coach (1914–1989)

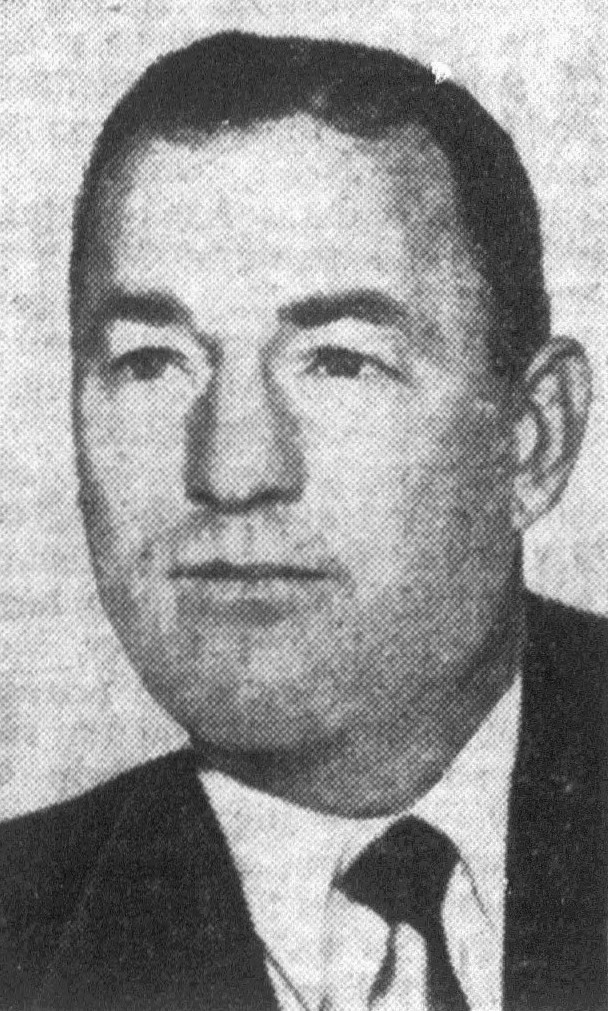
- Sebo, circa 1954

Biographical details
- Born: July 15, 1914; Battle Creek, Michigan, U.S.
- Died: December 10, 1989 (aged 75); Charlottesville, Virginia, U.S.

Playing career

Football
- 1934–1936: Michigan State

Baseball
- 1935–1937: Michigan State
- 1937: Alexandria Aces
- 1939: Big Spring Barons
- Positions: Halfback (football); Catcher (baseball)

Coaching career (HC unless noted)

Football
- 1937–1939: Petoskey HS (MI)
- 1944: Amarillo AAF (backfield)
- 1946–1948: Alma
- 1949: Harvard (backfield)
- 1950–1953: Michigan State (backfield)
- 1954–1959: Penn

Basketball
- 1937–1940: Petoskey HS (MI)
- 1946–1949: Alma

Baseball
- 1938–1940: Petoskey HS (MI)

Administrative career (AD unless noted)
- 1948: Alma
- 1960–1962: New York Titans (GM)
- 1962–1970: Virginia

Head coaching record
- Overall: 33–42–2 (college football); 36–24 (college basketball)

Accomplishments and honors

Championships
- 1 MIAA (1948); 1 Ivy (1959)

Stephen Sebo (July 15, 1914 – December 10, 1989) was an American football and baseball player, coach, college athletics administrator, and professional sports executive. He played baseball and football at Michigan State University, from which he graduated in 1937. He then played minor league baseball and coached sports at Petoskey High School in Petoskey, Michigan. During the World War II era, he served in the United States Army Air Forces and was discharged after five years with the rank of major. After the war, Sebo was the head football coach at Alma College from 1946 to 1948 and at the University of Pennsylvania from 1954 to 1959, compiling a career college football record of 33–42–2.

The highlight of Sebo's tenure at Penn was the 1959 season, in which the Quakers won their first Ivy League championship. As it turned out, even that wasn't enough to save his job; school officials had already decided before the season that his contract would not be renewed. He also coached basketball at Alma from 1946 to 1949, tallying a mark of 36–24. After Sebo was fired from his post at Penn following the 1959 season, he became the general manager of the New York Titans, a newly formed team of the upstart American Football League (AFL) that was renamed as the New York Jets in 1963. Sebo left the Titans in 1962 to become the athletic director at the University of Virginia.

Sebo died on December 10, 1989 at the University of Virginia's hospital in Charlottesville, Virginia, after suffering a heart attack while watching football at his home.

== Head coaching record ==
=== College football ===
| Year | Team | Overall | Conference | Standing | Bowl/playoffs |
|---|---|---|---|---|---|
Alma Scots (Michigan Intercollegiate Athletic Association) (1946–1948)
| 1946 | Alma | 2–5 | 2–3 | T–4th | |
| 1947 | Alma | 5–2–1 | 2–2–1 | 4th | |
| 1948 | Alma | 8–0 | 5–0 | 1st | |
| Alma: | | 15–7–1 | 9–5–1 | | |
Penn Quakers (Independent) (1954–1955)
| 1954 | Penn | 0–9 | | | |
| 1955 | Penn | 0–9 | | | |
Penn Quakers (Ivy League) (1956–1959)
| 1956 | Penn | 4–5 | 4–3 | T–3rd | |
| 1957 | Penn | 3–6 | 3–4 | T–4th | |
| 1958 | Penn | 4–5 | 4–3 | T–4th | |
| 1959 | Penn | 7–1–1 | 6–1 | 1st | |
| Penn: | | 18–35–1 | 17–11 | | |
| Total: | | 33–42–2 | | | |
National championship Conference title Conference division title or championship game berth
