= Edwin Steele =

American football and basketball coach

Coaching career (HC unless noted)

Football
- 1920: Alma

Basketball
- 1920–1921: Alma

Head coaching record
- Overall: 0–7 (football); 7–10 (basketball)

Edwin Steele was an American football and basketball coach. Steele was the head football coach at Alma College in Alma, Michigan. He held that position for the 1920 season. His coaching record at Alma was 0–7.

== Head coaching record ==
=== Football ===
Year	Team	Overall	Conference	Standing	Bowl/playoffs
Alma Maroon and Cream (Michigan Intercollegiate Athletic Association) (1920)
1920	Alma	0–7	0–5	6th	
Alma:		0–7	0–5		
Total:		0–7			
