= Floyd E. Lear =

American football and basketball coach

Coaching career (HC unless noted)

Football
- 1944–1945: Alma

Basketball
- 1944–1946: Alma

Head coaching record
- Overall: 1–12 (football); 13–16 (basketball)

Floyd E. "Bill" Lear was an American football and basketball coach. Lear was the head football coach at Alma College in Alma, Michigan. He held that position for the 1944 and 1945 seasons. His coaching record at Alma was 1 wins and 12 losses.
