= Al Vanderbush =

American football coach, athletics administrator (1907–2005)

Alvin Vanderbush
Biographical details
- Born: September 16, 1907
- Died: February 20, 2005 (aged 97); Bloomington, Minnesota, U.S.

Playing career

Football
- 1925–1928: Hope

Coaching career (HC unless noted)

Football
- 1946–1954: Hope

Track and field
- 1946–1948: Hope
- 1952: Hope

Cross country
- 1958–1959: Hope

Tennis
- 1957–1958: Hope

Administrative career (AD unless noted)
- 1954–1960: Hope

Head coaching record
- Overall: 46–28–2 (football)

Accomplishments and honors

Championships
- Football; 2 MIAA (1951, 1953)

Alvin Wallace Vanderbush (September 16, 1907 – February 20, 2005) was an American football coach and college athletics administrator. He served as the head football coach at Hope College in Hope, Michigan from 1946 to 1954, compiling a record of 46–28–2.

== Head coaching record ==
=== Football ===
Year	Team	Overall	Conference	Standing	Bowl/playoffs
Hope Flying Dutchmen (Michigan Intercollegiate Athletic Association) (1946–1954)
1946	Hope	6–2	3–2	3rd	
1947	Hope	5–2–1	3–1–1	3rd	
1948	Hope	5–3	2–3	T–4th	
1949	Hope	7–1	4–1	2nd	
1950	Hope	4–3–1	2–2–1	T–3rd	
1951	Hope	5–4	4–1	T–1st	
1952	Hope	4–5	4–1	2nd	
1953	Hope	7–2	5–1	1st	
1954	Hope	3–6	3–3	4th	
Hope:		46–28–2	30–15–2		
Total:		46–28–2			
National championship Conference title Conference division title or championship game berth
