= 1935 Alma Scots football team =

American college football season

1935 Alma Scots football

MIAA champion
- Conference: Michigan Intercollegiate Athletic Association
- Record: 8–0 (4–0 MIAA)
- Head coach: Royal R. Campbell (15th season)
- Home stadium: Bahlke Field

1935 Michigan Intercollegiate Athletic Association football standings
| | Conf. | | | | | Overall |
| Team | W | | L | | T | W | | L | | T |
|---|---|---|---|---|---|---|---|---|---|---|
| Alma $ | 4 | – | 0 | – | 0 | 8 | – | 0 | – | 0 |
| Kalamazoo | 2 | – | 1 | – | 1 | 2 | – | 3 | – | 2 |
| Hillsdale | 1 | – | 2 | – | 1 | 4 | – | 4 | – | 1 |
| Hope | 1 | – | 2 | – | 1 | 3 | – | 3 | – | 2 |
| Albion | 0 | – | 3 | – | 1 | 0 | – | 6 | – | 2 |
$ – Conference champion

The 1935 Alma Scots football team was an American football team that represented the Alma College as a member of the Michigan Intercollegiate Athletic Association (MIAA) during the 1935 college football season. In their 15th and final year under head coach Royal R. Campbell, the Scots compiled an 8–0 record (4–0 in conference games), won the MIAA championship, shut out six of eight opponents, and outscored all opponents by a total of 182 to 13.

== Schedule ==
| Date | Opponent | Site | Result | Source |
|---|---|---|---|---|
| September 28 | Detroit Tech* | Alma, MI | W 22–0 | |
| October 5 | at Hope | Holland, MI | W 13–0 | |
| October 12 | at Hillsdale | Hillsdale, MI | W 7–6 | |
| October 19 | Kalamazoo | Bahlke Field; Alma, MI | W 6–0 | |
| October 26 | at Olivet* | Olivet, MI | W 39–0 | |
| November 2 | Albion^{†} | Bahlke field; Alma, MI | W 12–7 | |
| November 9 | at Lawrence Tech* | St. Theresa's Field; Detroit, MI | W 70–0 | |
| November 16 | at Central State (MI)* | Alumni Field; Mount Pleasant, MI | W 13–0 | |
*Non-conference game; ^{†}Homecoming
