= Bob Nulf =

American sports coach, athletics administrator, and educator (1906–1985)

- Nulf in 1947

Biographical details
- Born: May 14, 1906
- Died: June 30, 1985 (aged 79); Fort Wayne, Indiana, U.S.
- Education: University of Illinois

Playing career

Football
- 1927: Butler

Baseball
- 1928: Butler
- Positions: Halfback (football); Center fielder (baseball)

Coaching career (HC unless noted)

Football
- 1929: Norwich HS (NY)
- 1930–1933: Central HS (IN) (assistant)
- 1934–1941: North Side HS (IN)
- 1942–1948: Kalamazoo
- 1949–1951: North Side HS (IN)

Basketball
- 1929–1930: Norwich HS (NY)
- 1934–1942: North Side HS (IN)
- 1942–1943: Kalamazoo

Baseball
- 1930: Norwich HS (NY)

Administrative career (AD unless noted)
- 1929–1940: Norwich HS (NY)
- 1942–1949: Kalamazoo

Head coaching record
- Overall: 18–10–4 (college football); 13–20 (college basketball)

Accomplishments and honors

Championships
- Football; 2 MIAA (1946–1947)

Robert W. Nulf (May 14, 1906 – June 30, 1985) was an American football, basketball, baseball, and track and field coach, athletics administrator, and educator. He served as the head football coach at Kalamazoo College in Kalamazoo, Michigan for four seasons, from 1942 to 1948, compiling a record of 18–10–4. Kalamazoo did not field a football team from 1943 to 1945.

Nulf attended Central High School in Fort Wayne, Indiana, where lettered in football, basketball, and baseball, and track. He played college football at Butler University as a halfback in 1927. The following year, he transferred to the University of Illinois.

After graduating from Illinois, Nulf began his coaching career, in 1929, when he was hired as director of physical education and coach of football, basketball, and baseball at Norwich High School in Norwich, New York. He resigned his post at Norwich after a year to return to Fort Wayne as an assistant coach at his alma mater, Central High School. After four years at Central, Nulf was appointed head coach of football and basketball at Fort Wayne's North Side High School. He remained at North Side for eight years, leading his football teams to a record of 54–9–6 and four city championships. His basketball teams tallied a mark of 119–47, won one city title outright, and shared two others. In 1942, Nulf was hired as the athletic director and head coach of football, basketball, and track at Kalamazoo College. He led the Kalamazoo Hornets football program to consecutive shared Michigan Intercollegiate Athletic Association (MIAA) titles, in 1946 and 1947. Nulf resigned from Kalamazoo College in 1949 to return to North Side High School at football coach.

Nulf retired from coach in 1952, when he went into sales with the Shakespeare Bait & Tackle Co. in Kalamazoo, for which he was a sale representative for 15 years in northern Ohio. He died on June 30, 1985, at his home in Fort Wayne.

== Head coaching record ==
=== College football ===
Year	Team	Overall	Conference	Standing	Bowl/playoffs
Kalamazoo Hornets (Michigan Intercollegiate Athletic Association) (1942–1948)
1942	Kalamazoo	4–3	2–2	T–2nd	
1943	No team—World War II				
1944	No team—World War II				
1945	No team—World War II				
1946	Kalamazoo	6–2	4–1	T–1st	
1947	Kalamazoo	4–1–3	3–0–2	T–1st	
1948	Kalamazoo	4–4–1	3–1–1	2nd	
Kalamazoo:		18–10–4	12–4–3		
Total:		18–10–4			
National championship Conference title Conference division title or championship game berth
