= Royal R. Campbell =

American football and basketball coach (1886–1951)

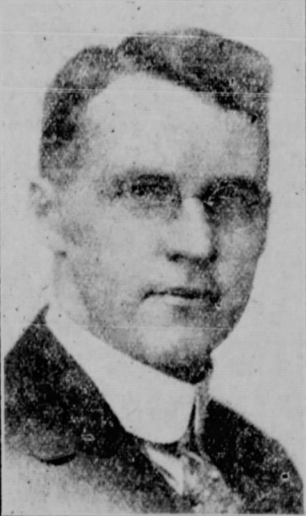
- Campbell pictured in the Alma Record, 1921

Biographical details
- Born: August 31, 1886; St. Ignace, Michigan, U.S.
- Died: December 31, 1951 (aged 65); Highland Park, Michigan, U.S.

Playing career

Football
- 1908–1909: Alma

Coaching career (HC unless noted)

Football
- c. 1910: Owosso HS (MI)
- 1911–1912: Detroit
- 1913–1914: Knox (IL)
- 1921–1935: Alma

Basketball
- 1909–1913: Detroit
- 1913–1915: Knox (IL)
- 1916–1919: Detroit
- 1921–1935: Alma

Administrative career (AD unless noted)
- 1921–1936: Alma

Head coaching record
- Overall: 75–60–12 (college football); 218–120 (college basketball)

Accomplishments and honors

Championships
- Football; 6 MIAA (1923, 1926–1927, 1929–1930, 1935)

Royal Roderick "Scottie" Campbell (August 31, 1886 – December 31, 1951) was an American football and basketball coach. He served as the head football coach at the University of Detroit—now the University of Detroit Mercy—from 1911 to 1912, at Knox College in Galesburg, Illinois from 1913 to 1914, and at Alma College from 1921 to 1935, compiling a career college football record of 75–60–12. Campbell was also the head basketball coach at Detroit (1909–1913, 1916–1919), Knox (1913–1915), and Alma (1921–1935), tallying a career college basketball mark of 218–120.

Campbell played college football at Alma in 1908 and 1909. His Scottish descent inspired school's fight name, "Scots", which was adopted during his tenure as coach. Campbell spent his later years in Detroit. He suffered a stroke on December 24, 1951, and was taken to Highland Park General Hospital in Highland Park, Michigan, where he died on December 31 of that year.

== Head coaching record ==
=== College football ===
Year	Team	Overall	Conference	Standing	Bowl/playoffs
Detroit Tigers (Independent) (1911–1912)
1911	Detroit	4–4			
1912	Detroit	5–2–1			
Detroit:		9–6–1			
Knox Old Siwash (Illinois Intercollegiate Athletic Conference) (1913–1914)
1913	Knox	2–3–2			
1914	Knox	4–3			
Knox:		6–6–2			
Alma Maroon and Cream / Scots (Michigan Intercollegiate Athletic Association) (1921–1935)
1921	Alma	2–6–1	1–4	6th	
1922	Alma	5–3–1	4–1	2nd	
1923	Alma	6–2–1	5–0	1st	
1924	Alma	3–5	3–2	3rd	
1925	Alma	4–4	2–3	T–4th	
1926	Alma	6–2	4–0	1st	
1927	Alma	7–1–1	5–0	1st	
1928	Alma	3–4	3–2	3rd	
1929	Alma	6–1	5–0	1st	
1930	Alma	5–3	4–1	T–1st	
1931	Alma	3–3–1	3–1–1	2nd	
1932	Alma	1–6	0–4	5th	
1933	Alma	0–4–2	0–2–2	T–4th	
1934	Alma	1–4–2	1–1–2	3rd	
1935	Alma	8–0	4–0	1st	
Alma:		60–48–9	44–21–5		
Total:		75–60–12			
National championship Conference title Conference division title or championship game berth
