= 1948 Alma Scots football team =

American college football season

1948 Alma Scots football
- Conference: Michigan Intercollegiate Athletic Association
- Record: 8–0 (5–0 MIAA)
- Head coach: Steve Sebo (3rd season)

1948 Michigan Intercollegiate Athletic Association football standings
| | Conf. | | | | | Overall |
| Team | W | | L | | T | W | | L | | T |
|---|---|---|---|---|---|---|---|---|---|---|
| Alma $ | 5 | – | 0 | – | 0 | 8 | – | 0 | – | 0 |
| Kalamazoo | 3 | – | 1 | – | 1 | 4 | – | 4 | – | 1 |
| Hillsdale | 2 | – | 2 | – | 1 | 6 | – | 2 | – | 1 |
| Hope | 2 | – | 3 | – | 0 | 5 | – | 3 | – | 0 |
| Adrian | 2 | – | 3 | – | 0 | 5 | – | 4 | – | 0 |
| Albion | 0 | – | 5 | – | 0 | 2 | – | 6 | – | 0 |
$ – Conference champion

The 1948 Alma Scots football team was an American football team that represented the Alma College as a member of the Michigan Intercollegiate Athletic Association (MIAA) during the 1948 college football season. In their third year under head coach Steve Sebo, the Scots compiled an 8–0 record (5–0 in conference games), won the MIAA championship, and outscored opponents by a tota of to . The team was inducted into the Alma Hall of Fame in 1972.

The highlight of the season was a come-from-behind, upset victory over Hillsdale featuring two fourth-quarter touchdowns. The victory broke Hillsdale's 17-game winning streak.

== Schedule ==
| Date | Opponent | Site | Result | Attendance | Source |
|---|---|---|---|---|---|
| September 25 | Detroit Tech | Robinson Field; Detroit, MI | W 25–6 | | |
| October 1 | Ferris Institute | Alma, MI | W 15–6 | | |
| October 8 | Hillsdale | Alma, MI | W 20–18 | | |
| October 16 | at Albion | Albion, MI | W 13–7 | | |
| October 23 | Kalamazoo | Alma, MI | W 20–0 | | |
| October 29 | Grand Rapids JC | Alma, MI | W 27–0 | | |
| November 6 | at Adrian | Adrian, MI | W 25–7 | 2,000 | |
| November 13 | at Hope | Holland, MI | W 25–13 | | |
