= 1940 Michigan Intercollegiate Athletic Association football season =

- League: Michigan Intercollegiate Athletic Association
- Sport: Football
- Number of teams: 6
- Champion: Albion

Football seasons
- ← 1939 1941 →

1940 Michigan Intercollegiate Athletic Association football standings
	Conf.					Overall
Team	W		L		T	W		L		T
Albion $	5	–	0	–	0	7	–	1	–	0
Alma	4	–	1	–	0	5	–	2	–	0
Hope	2	–	2	–	1	3	–	3	–	1
Hillsdale	2	–	2	–	1	2	–	4	–	1
Adrian	1	–	4	–	0	1	–	7	–	0
Kalamazoo	0	–	5	–	0	1	–	6	–	1
$ – Conference champion

The 1940 Michigan Intercollegiate Athletic Association football season was the season of college football played by the six member schools of the Michigan Intercollegiate Athletic Association (MIAA) as part of the 1940 college football season.

The Albion Britons, led by head coach Dale R. Sprankle and halfback Morris Trimble, won the MIAA championship with a 7–1 record (5–0 against conference opponents). Albion also won the 1939 MIAA championship, and the 1940 team returned a veteran team except for the center position.

The Alma Scots, led by head coach Gordon MacDonald, finished in second place with a 5–2 record (4–1 against MIAA opponents), losing to Albion on November 9 for its only conference defeat.

== Conference overview ==
Conf. rank	Team	Head coach	Overall record	Conf. record	Points scored	Points against
1	Albion	Dale R. Sprankle	7–1	5–0		
2	Alma	Gordon MacDonald	5–2	4–1		
3	Hope	Bud Hinga	3–3–1	2–2–1		
4	Hillsdale	Dwight Harwood	3–4–1	1–3–1		
5	Adrian	Harve A. Oliphant	1–7	1–4		
6	Kalamazoo	Chester S. Barnard	1–6–1	0–5		

== Teams ==
=== Albion ===
1940 Albion Britons football

MIAA champion
- Conference: Michigan Intercollegiate Athletic Association
- Record: 7–1 (5–0 MIAA)
- Head coach: Dale R. Sprankle (18th season)
- Home stadium: Alumni Field

The 1940 Albion Britons football team represented Albion College of Albion, Michigan. In their 18th year under head coach Dale R. Sprankle, the Britons compiled a 7–1 record (5–0 against MIAA opponents) and won the MIAA championship. Albion won 14 consecutive games during the 1939 and 1940 season, finally losing to Lake Forest in the final game of the 1940 season.

Three Albion players received first-team honors on the 1940 All-M.I.A.A. football team: halfback Maurice Trimble; end Charles VanderLinde; and guard Walter Ptak.

Albion was ranked at No. 356 (out of 697 college football teams) in the final rankings under the Litkenhous Difference by Score system for 1940.

Date	Opponent	Site	Result	Attendance	Source
September 20	Mount Union*	Alumni Field; Albion, MI	W 13–0		
September 28	at Kalamazoo	Kalamazoo, MI	W 7–3		
October 4	Adrian	Alumni Field; Albion, MI	W 19–0		
October 12	at Defiance*	Defiance, OH	W 34–7		
October 18	Hillsdale	Alumni Field; Albion, MI	W 19–6		
October 26	at Olivet	Olivet, MI			
November 2	at Hope	Holland, MI	W 6–0	5,000	
November 9	Alma^{†}	Alumni Field; Albion, MI	W 13–0	3,000	
November 16	at Lake Forest*	Lake Forest, IL	L 7–14		
*Non-conference game; ^{†}Homecoming

=== Alma ===
1940 Alma Scots football
- Conference: Michigan Intercollegiate Athletic Association
- Record: 5–2 (4–1 MIAA)
- Head coach: Gordon MacDonald (5th season)

The 1940 Alma Scots football team represented Alma College of Alma, Michigan. In their fifth year under head coach Gordon MacDonald, the Scots compiled a 5–2 record (4–1 against MIAA opponents) and finished in second place in the MIAA.

Four Alma players were named to the All-Michigan Intercollegiate Athletic Association football team: quarterback J. Tait; end Keith Carey; tackle E. Ziem; and guard G. Barnett.

Alma was ranked at No. 336 (out of 697 college football teams) in the final rankings under the Litkenhous Difference by Score system for 1940.

Date	Opponent	Site	Result	Attendance	Source
September 20	Grand Rapids		W 37–0		
October 4	at Hope	Holland, MI	W 19–7		
October 11	Hillsdale	Alma, MI	W 39–0		
October 19	at Adrian	Adrian, MI	W 14–0		
October 26	Kalamazoo^{†}	Alma, MI	W 19–2		
November 2	Michigan State Normal*	Briggs Field; Ypsilanti, MI	L 7–24		
November 9	at Albion	Albion, MI	L 0–13	3,000	
*Non-conference game; ^{†}Homecoming

=== Hope ===
1940 Hope Flying Dutchmen football
- Conference: Michigan Intercollegiate Athletic Association
- Record: 3–3–1 (2–2–1 MIAA)
- Head coach: Bud Hinga (10th season)

The 1940 Hope Flying Dutchmen football team represented Hope College of Hope, Michigan. In their 10th year under head coach Bud Hinga, the Dutchmen compiled a 3–3–1 record (2–2–1 against MIAA opponents) and finished in third place in the MIAA.

Hope was ranked at No. 443 (out of 697 college football teams) in the final rankings under the Litkenhous Difference by Score system for 1940.

Date	Opponent	Site	Result	Attendance	Source
September 20	Ferris Institute*	Holland, MI	W 35–0		
September 28	at Adrian	Adrian, MI	W 20–0		
October 4	Alma	Holland, MI	L 7–19		
October 12	at Kalamazoo	Kalamazoo, MI	W 7–0		
October 26	at Hillsdale	Hillsdale, MI	T 6–6		
November 2	Albion	Holland, MI	L 0–6	5,000	
November 9	Grand Rapids*	Holland, MI	L 6–10		
*Non-conference game

=== Hillsdale ===
1940 Hillsdale Dales football
- Conference: Michigan Intercollegiate Athletic Association
- Record: 3–4–1 (1–3–1 MIAA)
- Head coach: Dwight Harwood (14th season)

The 1940 Hillsdale Dales football team was an American football team that represented Hillsdale College in the Michigan Intercollegiate Athletic Association (MIAA) during the 1941 college football season. In their 14th year under head coach Dwight Harwood, the Dales compiled a 3–4–1 record (1–3–1 against MIAA opponents) and finished in fourth place out of six teams in the MIAA.

Center Robert Manby was selected as a first-team player on the 1940 All-MIAA football team. Senior fullback Bert Eklund was selected as the team's most valuable player.

Hillsdale was ranked at No. 519 (out of 697 college football teams) in the final rankings under the Litkenhous Difference by Score system for 1940.

Date	Opponent	Site	Result	Attendance	Source
September 20	Lawrence Tech*	Hillsdale, MI	L 9–19		
September 28	at Grand Rapids	Grand Rapids, MI	L 0–2		
October 4	Kalamazoo	Hillsdale, MI	W 14–6		
October 11	at Alma	Alma, MI	L 0–39		
October 19	at Albion	Albion, MI	L 6–19		
October 26	Hope	Hillsdale, MI	T 6–6		
November 9	Adrian	Hillsdale, MI	W 22–6		
*Non-conference game

=== Adrian ===
1940 Adrian Bulldogs football
- Conference: Michigan Intercollegiate Athletic Association
- Record: 1–7 (1–4 MIAA)
- Head coach: Harve A. Oliphant (3rd season)

The 1940 Adrian Bulldogs football team represented Adrian College of Adrian, Michigan. In their third year under head coach Harve A. Oliphant, the Bulldogs compiled a 1–7 record (1–4 against MIAA opponents) and finished in fifth place out of six teams in the MIAA.

Adrian was ranked at No. 611 (out of 697 college football teams) in the final rankings under the Litkenhous Difference by Score system for 1940.

Date	Opponent	Site	Result	Attendance	Source
September 21	Findlay*	Adrian, MI	L 0–19		
September 29	Hope	Adrian, MI	L 0–20		
October 4	at Albion	Albion, MI	L 0–19		
October 19	Alma	Adrian, MI	L 0–14		
October 26	at Assumption (ON)*	Kennedy Collegiate Field; Windsor, ON	L 0–14		
November 3	Kalamazoo	Adrian, MI	W 13–12		
November 9	at Hillsdale	Hillsdale, MI	L 6–22		
November 16	at Ferris Institute*	Big Rapids, MI	L 0–7		
*Non-conference game

=== Kalamazoo ===
1940 Kalamazoo Hornets football
- Conference: Michigan Intercollegiate Athletic Association
- Record: 1–6–1 (0–5 MIAA)
- Head coach: Chester S. Barnard (16th season)

The 1940 Kalamazoo Hornets football team represented Kalamazoo College of Kalamazoo, Michigan. In their 16th year under head coach Chester S. Barnard, the Hornets compiled a 1–6–1 record (0–5 against MIAA opponents) and finished in last place in the MIAA.

Kalamazoo was ranked at No. 468 (out of 697 college football teams) in the final rankings under the Litkenhous Difference by Score system for 1940.

Date	Opponent	Site	Result	Attendance	Source
September 20	Grand Rapids	Kalamazoo, MI	L 6–20		
September 28	Albion	Kalamazoo, MI	L 3–7		
October 4	at Hillsdale	Hillsdale, MI	L 6–14		
October 12	Hope	Kalamazoo, MI	L 0–7		
October 26	at Alma	Alma, MI	L 2–19		
November 2	at Adrian	Adrian, MI	L 12–13		
November 9	at Hiram	Hiram, OH	T 7–7		
November 15	at Michigan State Normal*	Briggs Field; Ypsilanti, MI	W 13–3		
*Non-conference game

== All-conference team ==
The following players were selected as first-team players on the All-MIAA football team:

- Quarterback - J. Tait, Alma
- Fullback - Robert Montgomery
- Halfbacks - Morris Trimble, Albion; Steve Dalla, Kalamazoo
- Ends - Keith Carey, Alma; Charles Vanderlinde, Albion
- Tackles - Dick Thompson, Adrian; Paul Van Kueren, Kalamazoo; E. Ziem, Alma
- Guards - Walter Ptak, Albion; G. Barnett, Alma
- Center - Robert Manby, Hillsdale
