= 1938 Hillsdale Dales football team =

American college football season

1938 Hillsdale Dales football

MIAA champion
- Conference: Michigan Intercollegiate Athletic Association
- Record: 8–0 (4–0 MIAA)
- Head coach: Dwight Harwood (12th season)

1938 Michigan Intercollegiate Athletic Association football standings
	Conf.					Overall
Team	W		L		T	W		L		T
Hillsdale $	4	–	0	–	0	8	–	0	–	0
Albion	2	–	1	–	1	5	–	2	–	1
Kalamazoo	1	–	2	–	1	3	–	4	–	1
Alma	1	–	2	–	1	3	–	5	–	1
Hope	0	–	3	–	1	4	–	3	–	1
$ – Conference champion

The 1938 Hillsdale Dales football team was an American football team that represented Hillsdale College as a member of the Michigan Intercollegiate Athletic Association (MIAA) during the 1938 college football season. In their 12th year under head coach Dwight Harwood, the Dales compiled a perfect 8–0 (5–0 in conference games), won the MIAA championship, shut out five opponents, and outscored all opponents by a total of 224 to 27.

Halfback Albert Rizzardi was selected as a NAIA All-American, the first Hillsdale player to be so honored. Six Hillsdale players received all-conference honors: Rizzardi, Billy Trau, and Gordon Piatt at back; Jerome Zaiser at center; Ronald Larson at end; and Spencer Pratt at tackle.

The team was inducted as a group into the Hillsdale College Hall of Fame in 1998.

== Schedule ==
Date	Opponent	Site	Result	Source
September 24	Bluffton*	Hlllsdale, MI	W 18–0	
October 1	at Olivet*	Olivet, MI	W 32–7	
October 8	Adrian*	Hillsdale, MI	W 52–0	
October 15	at Grand Rapids*	Grand Rapids, MI	W 28–14	
October 22	Kalamazoo	Hillsdale, MI	W 14–6	
October 29	at Alma	Alma, MI	W 20–0	
November 5	at Albion	Alumni field; Albion, MI	W 27–0	
November 12	Hope	Hillsdale, MI	W 33–0	
*Non-conference game
