= Bud Hinga =

American football coach and athletic director (1900–1960)

Biographical details
- Born: October 18, 1900; Kalamazoo, Michigan, U.S.
- Died: May 31, 1960 (aged 59); Holland, Michigan, U.S

Coaching career (HC unless noted)

Football
- 1923–1930: Hope HS (MI)
- 1931–1943: Hope

Basketball
- 1931–1943: Hope
- 1945–1948: Hope

Golf
- 1934: Hope
- 1936: Hope
- 1939–1942: Hope

Tennis
- 1946–1947: Hope

Administrative career (AD unless noted)
- 1931–1953: Hope

Head coaching record
- Overall: 39–33–20 (college football); 188–71 (college basketball)

Accomplishments and honors

Championships
- Football; 1 MIAA (1934)

Milton Lage "Bud" Hinga (October 18, 1900 – May 31, 1960) was an American football coach and college athletics administrator.

Hinga graduated from Kalamazoo Central High School and Kalamazoo College. He won letters at Kalamazoo College in football, baseball, and basketball.

Hinga served as the head football coach at Hope College in Holland, Michigan from 1931 to 1942. He was also the coach of other Hope sports teams, including the basketball and golf teams. He also served as dean of men starting in 1943. He became dean of students in 1956.

Hinga was married in 1925 to Gladys Kendrick, and they had two children, Constance and Bill. Hinga died in 1960 from Hodgkin's disease at age 59.

== Head coaching record ==
=== College football ===
Year	Team	Overall	Conference	Standing	Bowl/playoffs
Hope Flying Dutchmen (Michigan Intercollegiate Athletic Association) (1931–1942)
1931	Hope	3–4–1	1–3–1	5th	
1932	Hope	4–2–2	1–1–2	3rd	
1933	Hope	3–2–2	1–1–2	T–2nd	
1934	Hope	3–2–2	2–1–1	T–1st	
1935	Hope	3–3–2	1–2–1	T–3rd	
1936	Hope	5–2–1	5–2–1	T–2nd	
1937	Hope	3–4–1	1–3	T–4th	
1938	Hope	4–3–1	0–3–1	5th	
1939	Hope	4–2–2	3–2–1	3rd	
1940	Hope	3–3–1	2–2–1	T–3rd	
1941	Hope	3–2–3	2–1–2	3rd	
1942	Hope	1–4–2	1–3	T–4th	
Hope:		39–33–20	20–24–13		
Total:		39–33–20			
National championship Conference title Conference division title or championship game berth
