= Perry Grimm (American football) =

American football and basketball coach

Biographical details
- Born: November 3, 1888; Ravenswood, West Virginia, U.S.
- Died: January 12, 1974 (aged 85); Cincinnati, Ohio, U.S.

Coaching career (HC unless noted)

Football
- 1916–1917: Adrian

Basketball
- 1916–1918: Adrian

Head coaching record
- Overall: 1–3 (football); 11–14 (basketball)

Perry Everett Grimm (November 3, 1888 – January 12, 1974) was an American college football and college basketball coach. He was the head football coach at Adrian College in Adrian, Michigan for two seasons, from the 1916 to 1917, compiling a record of 1–3. Grimm was also the head basketball coach at Adrian from 1916 to 1918, tallying a mark of 11–14.

== Head coaching record ==
=== Football ===
Year	Team	Overall	Conference	Standing	Bowl/playoffs
Adrian Bulldogs (Michigan Intercollegiate Athletic Association) (1916–1917)
1916	Adrian	1–0			
1917	Adrian	0–3	0–2	5th	
Adrian:		1–3			
Total:		1–3			
