= Dwight Harwood =

American football and basketball coach

Biographical details
- Born: April 29, 1892; Plainwell, Michigan, U.S.
- Died: August 8, 1965 (aged 73); Sault Ste. Marie, Michigan, U.S.

Coaching career (HC unless noted)

Football
- 1927–1945: Hillsdale

Basketball
- 1926–1934: Hillsdale
- 1940–1946: Hillsdale

Head coaching record
- Overall: 68–53–14 (football); 60–104 (basketball)

Accomplishments and honors

Championships
- Football; 4 MIAA (1931–1933, 1938)

Dwight Brigham Harwood (April 29, 1892 – August 8, 1965) was an American football and basketball coach. He was the head football coach at Hillsdale College in Hillsdale, Michigan for 19 seasons, from 1927 until 1945, compiling a record of 68–53–14. Harwood also served two stints as the head basketball coach at Hillsdale, from 1926 to 1934 and 1940 to 1946, tallying a mark of 60–104.

Harwood graduated from Hillsdale in 1914. He died of a heart attack in 1965 at the age of 73.

== Head coaching record ==
=== Football ===
Year	Team	Overall	Conference	Standing	Bowl/playoffs
Hillsdale Dales (Michigan Intercollegiate Athletic Association) (1927–1945)
1927	Hillsdale	3–5–1	2–3	T–3rd	
1928	Hillsdale	1–3–3	0–2–3	T–4th	
1929	Hillsdale	5–2–1	2–2–1	3rd	
1930	Hillsdale	5–3	3–2	T–3rd	
1931	Hillsdale	6–0–2	3–0–2	1st	
1932	Hillsdale	7–1	4–0	1st	
1933	Hillsdale	6–0–2	4–0	1st	
1934	Hillsdale	2–5–1	1–2–1	T–4th	
1935	Hillsdale	4–4–1	1–2–1	T–3rd	
1936	Hillsdale	4–5–1	2–5–1	5th	
1937	Hillsdale	3–6	2–2	T–2nd	
1938	Hillsdale	8–0	4–0	1st	
1939	Hillsdale	6–1	5–1	2nd	
1940	Hillsdale	2–4–1	2–2–1	T–3rd	
1941	Hillsdale	3–4–1	1–3–1	5th	
1942	Hillsdale	3–5	1–3	T–4th	
1943	No team—World War II				
1944	No team—World War II				
1945	Hillsdale	0–5	NA	NA	
Hillsdale:		68–53–14	37–29–11		
Total:		68–53–14			
National championship Conference title Conference division title or championship game berth
