= Harvey E. Orwick =

American football and basketball coach

Biographical details
- Born: April 27, 1890 near Arlington, Ohio, U.S.
- Died: June 5, 1949 (aged 59); Chicago, Illinois, U.S.

Coaching career (HC unless noted)

Football
- 1919: Adrian

Basketball
- 1919–1921: Adrian

Head coaching record
- Overall: 4–2 (football); 10–21 (basketball)

Harvey Edson Orwick (April 27, 1890 – June 5, 1949) was an American football and basketball coach. He was the head football coach at Adrian College in Adrian, Michigan for one seasons, in 1919, compiling a record of 4–2. Leith was also the head basketball coach at Adrian from 1919 to 1921, tallying a mark of 10–21. He was born on a farm near Arlington, Ohio.

== Head coaching record ==
=== Football ===
Year	Team	Overall	Conference	Standing	Bowl/playoffs
Adrian Bulldogs (Michigan Intercollegiate Athletic Association) (1919)
1919	Adrian	4–2			
Adrian:		4–2			
Total:		4–2			
