= 1946 Michigan Intercollegiate Athletic Association football season =

- League: Michigan Intercollegiate Athletic Association
- Sport: Football
- Number of teams: 6
- Co-champions: Hillsdale, Kalamazoo

Football seasons
- ← 1945 1947 →

1946 Michigan Intercollegiate Athletic Association football standings
	Conf.					Overall
Team	W		L		T	W		L		T
Hillsdale +	4	–	1	–	0	7	–	1	–	0
Kalamazoo +	4	–	1	–	0	6	–	2	–	0
Hope	3	–	2	–	0	6	–	2	–	0
Albion	2	–	3	–	0	3	–	5	–	0
Alma	2	–	3	–	0	2	–	5	–	0
Adrian	0	–	5	–	0	0	–	8	–	0
+ – Conference co-champions

The 1946 Michigan Intercollegiate Athletic Association football season was the season of college football played by the six member schools of the Michigan Intercollegiate Athletic Association (MIAA) as part of the 1946 college football season.

The Hilllsdale Dales, in their first season under head coach David M. Nelson, tied for the MIAC championship with a 7–1 record (4–1 against MIAA opponents) and outscored opponents by a total of 193 to 50.

The Kalamazoo Hornets, in their second season under head coach Bob Nulf, tied with Hillsdale for the conference championship with a 6–2 record (4–1 against MIAA opponents).

Three players were unanimous picks to the 1946 All-Star M.I.A.A. football team: quarterback Nick Yonker of Hope; halfback Billy Young of Hillsdale; and end Don Schreiner of Hope.

== Conference overview ==
Conf. rank	Team	Head coach	Conf. record	Overall record	Points scored	Points against
1 (tie)	Hilllsdale	David M. Nelson	4–1	7–1	193	50
1 (tie)	Kalamazoo	Bob Nulf	4–1	6–2	145	45
3	Hope	Al Vanderbush	3–2	6–2	160	40
4 (tie)	Albion	Dale R. Sprankle	2–3	3–5	67	130
4 (tie)	Alma	Steve Sebo	2–3	2–5	59	117
6	Adrian	Lyman E. Abbott	0–5	0–8	12	159

== Teams ==
=== Hillsdale ===
1946 Hillsdale Dales football

MIAA co-champion
- Conference: Michigan Intercollegiate Athletic Association
- Record: 7–1 (4–1 MIAA)
- Head coach: David M. Nelson (1st season)
- MVP: Bill Young

The 1946 Hillsdale Dales football team was an American football team that represented Hillsdale College in the Michigan Intercollegiate Athletic Association (MIAA) during the 1946 college football season. In their first year under head coach David M. Nelson, the Dales compiled a 7–1 record (4–1 against MIAA opponents), tied for the MIAA championship, and outscored opponents by a total of 193 to 50.

Although recognized as co-champions with Kalamazoo College, Hillsdale defeated Kalamazoo, 20-0. Asked about a possible playoff game at the end of the season, coach Nelson said: "No playoff is needed. We beat Kalamazoo, 20 to 0, during the season. That shows which is the better ball club."

Nelson, who had played in the Michigan backfield with Tom Harmon, Forest Evashevski, and Bob Westfall, was hired as Hillsdale's athletic director in February 1946. He had served 41 months in the Navy during World War II. His hiring raised Hillsdale's profile, and he assembled a team of 50 players, 47 of whome were former service men. At least 15 of them were out-of-state men who Nelson had met while serving in the Pacific Theater. In August 1946, Nelson noted: "I have so many ex-marines coming out for the team . . . that we should have the situation well in hand." Nelson was inducted into the College Football Hall of Fame in 1987.

Hillsdale backs Tom Ward and Bill Young were known as the Dales' "touchdown twins". The pair led the state in scoring with 12 touchdowns and 72 points each. Young also tallied 997 rushing yards in just eight games. Young was selected by his teammates as the team's most valuable player.

Four Hillsdale players received first-team honors from the Associated Press (AP) on the 1946 All-Star M.I.A.A. football team: Young and Ward at back; Alex Clelland at center; and John Masterson at tackle. In addition, back George Albright received second-team honors.'

Date	Opponent	Site	Result	Source
September 27	Ferris Institute*	Hillsdale, MI	W 44–0	
September 27	at Albion	Albion, MI	L 6–13	
October 12	Kalamazoo	Hillsdale, MI	W 20–0	
October 19	at Adrian	Adrian, MI	W 33–6	
October 26	Michigan State Normal*^{†}	Hillsdale, MI	W 18–7	
November 1	at Alma	Alma, MI	W 19–0	
November 9	Hope	Hillsdale, MI	W 21–20	
November 16	Lawrence Tech*	Hillsdale, MI	W 32–13	
*Non-conference game; ^{†}Homecoming

=== Kalamazoo ===
1946 Kalamazoo Hornets football

MIAA co-champion
- Conference: Michigan Intercollegiate Athletic Association
- Record: 6–2 (4–1 MIAA)
- Head coach: Bob Nulf (2nd season)

The 1946 Kalamazoo Hornets football team represented Kalamazoo College of Kalamazoo, Michigan. In their second non-consecutive year under head coach Bob Nulf, the Hornets compiled a 6–2 record (4–1 against MIAA opponents), tied for the MIAA championship, shut out four of eight opponents, and outscored all opponents by a total of 145 to 45.

Kalamazoo's football team included 11 players from the South Bend, Indiana, area. The leading scorers were Tom Shopoff (42 points) and Bob Reed (41 points). Shopoff and guard V. Marandino were first-team picks on the 1946 All-Star M.I.A.A. football team.

Date	Opponent	Site	Result	Attendance	Source
September 27	Adrian	Kalamazoo, MI	W 20–0		
October 4	Detroit Tech*	Kalamazoo, MI	W 27–6		
October 12	Hillsdale	Hillsdale, MI	L 0–20		
October 19	Hope^{†}	Kalamazoo, MI	W 13–0	5,500	
October 26	at Albion	Albion, MI	W 24–0	> 3,000	
November 1	Kent State*	Kalamazoo, MI	L 0–12		
November 8	Alma	Kalamazoo, MI	W 41–7		
November 16	Defiance*	Kalamazoo, MI	W 20–0	500	
*Non-conference game; ^{†}Homecoming

=== Hope ===
1946 Hope Flying Dutchmen football
- Conference: Michigan Intercollegiate Athletic Association
- Record: 6–2 (3–2 MIAA)
- Head coach: Al Vanderbush (1st season)

The 1946 Hope Flying Dutchmen football team represented Hope College of Hope, Michigan. In their first year under head coach Al Vanderbush, the Dutchmen compiled a 6–2 record (3–2 against MIAA opponents), finished in third place in the MIAA, shut out five of eight opponents, and outscored all opponents by a total of 160 to 40.

Two Hope players, quarterback Nick Yonker and end Dan Schriemer, were selected as first-team players on the 1946 All-Star M.I.A.A. football team. Yoner was a unanimous pick.

Date	Opponent	Site	Result	Attendance	Source
September 20	Ferris Institute*	Holland, MI	W 38–6		
September 27	at Albion	Albion, MI	W 26–0		
October 4	Michigan State Normal*	Holland, MI	W 13–0		
October 10	at Grand Rapids*	Grand Rapids, MI	W 20–0		
October 19	at Kalamazoo	Kalamazoo, MI	L 0–13	5,500	
October 26	Alma^{†}	Holland, MI	W 24–0	6,000	
November 2	at Adrian	Adrian, MI	W 19–0		
November 16	at Hillsdale	Hillsdale, MI	L 20–21		
*Non-conference game; ^{†}Homecoming

=== Albion ===
1946 Albion Britons football
- Conference: Michigan Intercollegiate Athletic Association
- Record: 3–5 (2–3 MIAA)
- Head coach: Dale R. Sprankle (9th season)

The 1946 Albion Britons football team represented Albion College of Albion, Michigan. In their ninth and final year under head coach Dale R. Sprankle, the Britons compiled a 3–5 record (2–3 against MIAA opponents), finished in a tie for fourth place in the MIAA, and were outscored by a total of 130 to 67.

Two Albion players, end Ben Fies and guard Charles Clark, were selected as first-team players on the 1946 All-Star M.I.A.A. football team. Back Robert Mohr was named to the second team.

Date	Opponent	Site	Result	Attendance	Source
September 27	Hope	Albion, MI	L 0–26		
October 5	Hillsdale	Albion, MI	W 13–6		
October 12	Adrian	Albion, MI	W 27–0		
October 19	at Alma	Alma, MI	L 13–14	2,000	
October 26	Kalamazoo	Albion, MI	L 0–24	> 3,000	
November 2	at Michigan State Normal*	Briggs Field; Ypsilanti, MI	L 6–13	3,500	
November 9	at Otterbein*	Westerville, OH	L 0–40	5,000	
November 16	Ashland*	Albion, MI	W 8–7		
*Non-conference game

=== Alma ===
1946 Alma Scots football
- Conference: Michigan Intercollegiate Athletic Association
- Record: 2–5 (2–3 MIAA)
- Head coach: Steve Sebo (1st season)

The 1946 Alma Scots football team represented Alma College of Alma, Michigan. In their first year under head coach Steve Sebo, the Scots compiled a 2–5 record (2–3 against MIAA opponents), finished in a tie for fourth place in the MIAA, and were outscored by a total of 117 to 59.

Alma back Max Tullis was selected as a first-team player on the 1946 All-Star M.I.A.A. football team. Tackle Kenneth Swanson and guard Gayle Sexton were named to the second team.

Date	Opponent	Site	Result	Attendance	Source
October 4	at Adrian	Adrian, MI	W 25–0		
October 11	at Michigan State Normal*	Briggs Field; Ypsilanti, MI	L 0–6		
October 19	Albion	Alma, MI	W 14–13		
October 26	at Hope	Holland, MI	L 0–24	6,000	
November 1	Hillsdale	Alma, MI	L 0–19		
November 8	at Kalamazoo	Kalamazoo, MI	L 7–41		
November 15	Ferris Institute*	Alma, MI	L 13–14		
*Non-conference game

=== Adrian ===
1946 Adrian Bulldogs football
- Conference: Michigan Intercollegiate Athletic Association
- Record: 0–8 (0–5 MIAA)
- Head coach: Lyman E. Abbott (1st season)

The 1946 Adrian Bulldogs football team represented Adrian College of Adrian, Michigan. Led by first-year head coach Lyman E. Abbott, the Bulldogs compiled a 0–8 record (0–5 against MIAA opponents), finished in last place in the MIAA, and were outscored by a total of 159 to 12.

Adrian tackle James Staup was selected as a first-team player on the 1946 All-Star M.I.A.A. football team.

Date	Opponent	Site	Result	Attendance	Source
September 27	at Kalamazoo	Kalamazoo, MI	L 0–20		
October 4	Alma		L 0–25		
October 12	Albion		L 0–27		
October 19	Hillsdale	Adrian, MI	L 6–33		
October 25	Findlay*		L 0–13		
November 2	Hope	Adrian, MI	L 0–19		
November 11	Lawrence Tech*	Adrian, MI (Armistice Day)	L 0–13		
November 16	Detroit Tech*	Robinson Field	L 6–9		
*Non-conference game

== All-conference team ==
The Associated Press (AP) polled the MIAA coaches and selected the following players to the 1946 All-Star M.I.A.A. football team. Three players were unanimous picks: quarterback Nick Yonker of Hope; halfback Billy Young of Hillsdale; and end Don Schreiner of Hope.

First team

- Quarterback: Nick Yonker, Hope
- Backs: William Young, Hillsdale; Max Tullis, Alma; Thomas Ward, Hillsdale
- Fullback: Tom Shopoff, Kalamazoo
- Ends: Dan Schriemer, Hope; Ben Fies, Albion
- Tackles: James Staup, Adrian; John Masterson, Hillsdale
- Guards: V. Marandino, Kalamazoo Charles Clark, Albion
- Center: Alex Clelland, Hillsdale

Second team

- Quarterback: Jack Hart, Kalamazoo
- Backs: Robert Mohr, Albion; Bob Emery, Hope; George Abright, Hillsdale
- Fullback: Robert Reed, Kalamazoo
- Ends: Milt Christen, Kalamazoo; Clair DeMull, Hope
- Tackles: Rip Collins, Hope; Kenneth Swanson, Alma
- Guards: Gayle Saxton, Alma; Jack Trump, Kalamazoo
- Center: H. Southworth, Kalamazoo
