= Jack Schouten =

American sports coach, athletics administrator (1881–1978)

Biographical details
- Born: June 12, 1881; Holland, Michigan, U.S.
- Died: December 18, 1978 (aged 97); Holland, Michigan, U.S.

Coaching career (HC unless noted)

Football
- 1917: Hope
- 1920–1930: Hope

Basketball
- 1916–1917: Hope
- 1919–1931: Hope

Baseball
- 1919–1952: Hope

Track and field
- 1919–1928: Hope
- 1934–1942: Hope

Cross country
- 1919–1921: Hope
- 1925: Hope
- 1927: Hope

Administrative career (AD unless noted)
- 1919–1931: Hope

Head coaching record
- Overall: 12–43–5 (football); 122–119 (basketball); 96–107–1 (baseball)

John H. L. Schouten (June 12, 1881 – December 18, 1978) was an American college football, basketball, baseball, track and field, and cross country coach and athletics administrator. He served as the head football coach at Hope College in Holland, Michigan, in 1917 and again from 1920 to 1930. He also coached other sports and served as trainer at Hope from 1908 to 1952. He also created the physical education program at Hope in 1949. The college gymnasium was named after him in 1954. Schouten died on December 18, 1978, at age 97.

== Head coaching record ==
=== Football ===
Year	Team	Overall	Conference	Standing	Bowl/playoffs
Hope Flying Dutchmen (Independent) (1917)
1917	Hope	1–0			
Hope Flying Dutchmen (Independent) (1920–1926)
1920	Hope	1–5			
1921	Hope	0–4			
1922	Hope	1–2–1			
1923	Hope	2–2			
1924	Hope	1–4–1			
1925	Hope	2–2–1			
1926	Hope	1–5			
Hope Flying Dutchmen (Michigan Intercollegiate Athletic Association) (1927–1930)
1927	Hope	1–5	1–4	T–5th	
1928	Hope	1–3–2	0–3–2	T–5th	
1929	Hope	1–5	1–4	5th	
1930	Hope	0–6	0–5	6th	
Hope:		12–43–5	2–16–2		
Total:		12–43–5			
