= 1941 Michigan Intercollegiate Athletic Association football season =

- League: Michigan Intercollegiate Athletic Association
- Sport: Football
- Number of teams: 6
- Champion: Alma

Football seasons
- ← 1940 1942 →

1941 Michigan Intercollegiate Athletic Association football standings
	Conf.					Overall
Team	W		L		T	W		L		T
Alma $	4	–	0	–	1	6	–	0	–	1
Albion	3	–	1	–	1	3	–	4	–	1
Hope	2	–	1	–	2	3	–	2	–	3
Kalamazoo	2	–	2	–	1	5	–	2	–	1
Hillsdale	1	–	3	–	1	3	–	4	–	1
Adrian	0	–	5	–	0	2	–	6	–	0
$ – Conference champion

The 1941 Michigan Intercollegiate Athletic Association football season was the season of college football played by the six member schools of the Michigan Intercollegiate Athletic Association (MIAA) as part of the 1941 college football season.

The Alma Scots, led by head coach Gordon MacDonald, won the MIAC championship with a 6–0–1 record (4–0–1 against conference opponents) and outscored opponents by a total 131 to 19.

== Conference overview ==
Conf. rank	Team	Head coach	Overall record	Conf. record	Points scored	Points against
1	Alma	Gordon MacDonald	6–0–1	4–0–1	131	19
2	Albion	Del Anderson	3–4–1	3–0–1	52	118
3	Hope	Bud Hinga	3–2–3	2–1–2	35	36
4	Kalamazoo	Chester S. Barnard	5–2–1	2–2–1	68	38
5	Hillsdale	Dwight Harwood	3–4–1	1–3–1	61	89
6	Adrian	Harve A. Oliphant	2–6	0–5	19	141

== Teams ==
=== Alma ===
1941 Alma Scots football
- Conference: Michigan Intercollegiate Athletic Association
- Record: 6–0–1 (4–0–1 MIAA)
- Head coach: Gordon MacDonald (6th season)

The 1941 Alma Scots football team represented Alma College of Alma, Michigan. In their sixth year under head coach Gordon MacDonald, the Scots compiled a 6–0–1 record (4–0–1 against MIAA opponents), won the MIAA championship, and outscored opponents by a total of 131 to 19.

Four Alma players were named to the All-Michigan Intercollegiate Athletic Association football team; quarterback Robert Kirby; end Keith Carey; tackle Edward Baklarz; and guard James Hicks.

Alma was ranked at No. 258 (out of 681 teams) in the final rankings under the Litkenhous Difference by Score System.

Date	Opponent	Site	Result	Source
September 27	at Grand Rapids*	Grand Rapids, MI	W 12–0	
October 3	Hope	Alma, MI	T 7–7	
October 10	at Hillsdale	Hillsdale, MI	W 6–0	
October 18	Adrian	Alma, MI	W 46–6	
October 25	at Kalamazoo	Kalamazoo, MI	W 13–0	
October 31	vs. Lawrence Tech*	Bay City, MI	W 26–6	
November 8	Albion	Alma, MI	W 21–0	
*Non-conference game

=== Albion ===
1941 Albion Britons football
- Conference: Michigan Intercollegiate Athletic Association
- Record: 3–4–1 (3–0–1 MIAA)
- Head coach: Dale R. Sprankle (19th season)

The 1941 Albion Britons football team represented Albion College of Albion, Michigan. In their 19th year under head coach Dale R. Sprankle, the Britons compiled a 3–4–1 record (3–0–1 against MIAA opponents), finished in second place in the MIAA, and were outscored by a total of 118 to 52. The game between Albion and Hillsdale marked the 50th anniversary of the first football game between the schools, which was also the first football game in the MIAA.

Albion tackle Robert Fles was selected as a first-team player on the 1941 All-Star M.I.A.A. football team.

Albion was ranked at No. 457 (out of 681 teams) in the final rankings under the Litkenhous Difference by Score System.

Date	Opponent	Site	Result	Source
September 27	at Ohio Wesleyan*	Delaware, OH	L 0–33	
October 4	at Adrian	Adrian, MI	W 12–0	
October 10	Ohio Northern*	Alumni Field; Albion, MI	L 6–25	
October 18	at Hillsdale	Hillsdale, MI	T 7–7	
October 25	Lake Forest*	Alumni Field; Albion, MI	L 7–26	
November 1	Hope^{†}	Alumni Field; Albion, MI	W 7–0	
November 8	at Alma	Alma, MI	L 0–21	
November 15	Kalamazoo	Albion, MI	W 13–6	
*Non-conference game; ^{†}Homecoming

=== Hope ===
1941 Hope Flying Dutchmen football
- Conference: Michigan Intercollegiate Athletic Association
- Record: 3–2–3 (2–1–2 MIAA)
- Head coach: Bud Hinga (11th season)

The 1941 Hope Flying Dutchmen football team represented Hope College of Hope, Michigan. In their 11th year under head coach Bud Hinga, the Dutchmen compiled a 3–2–3 record (2–1–2 against MIAA opponents), finished in third place in the MIAA, and were outscored by a total of 36 to 35.

Three Hope players were selected as first-team players on the 1941 All-Star M.I.A.A. football team: halfback Don Defouw; center William Tappen; and tackle Martin Bekken.

Hope was ranked at No. 501 (out of 681 teams) in the final rankings under the Litkenhous Difference by Score System.

Date	Opponent	Site	Result	Source
September 19	Grand Rapids*		W 10–0	
September 26	Michigan State Normal*	Holland, MI	T 0–0	
October 3	at Alma	Alma, MI	T 7–7	
October 17	Grand Rapids*	Holland, MI	L 0–16	
October 24	Hillsdale	Holland, MI	W 6–0	
November 1	at Albion	Alumni Field; Albion, MI	L 0–7	
November 8	Kalamazoo*	Holland, MI	T 6–6	
November 14	Adrian	Holland, MI	W 6–0	
*Non-conference game

=== Kalamazoo ===
1941 Kalamazoo Hornets football
- Conference: Michigan Intercollegiate Athletic Association
- Record: 5–2–1 (2–2–1 MIAA)
- Head coach: Chester S. Barnard (17th season)

The 1941 Kalamazoo Hornets football team represented Kalamazoo College of Kalamazoo, Michigan. In their 17th and final year under head coach Chester S. Barnard, the Hornets compiled a 5–2–1 record (2–2–1 against MIAA opponents), finished in fourth place in the MIAA, and outscored opponents by a total of 68 to 38.

Kalamazoo was ranked at No. 467 (out of 681 teams) in the final rankings under the Litkenhous Difference by Score System.

Date	Opponent	Site	Result	Source
September 26	Grand Rapids*		W 15–0	
October 4	Hillsdale	Kalamazoo, MI	W 8–0	
October 11	Michigan State Normal*	Kalamazoo, MI	W 7–0	
October 18	at Western Ontario*	London, ON	W 7–6	
October 25	Alma	Kalamazoo, MI	L 0–13	
November 1	Adrian	Kalamazoo, MI	W 19–0	
November 8	at Hope	Holland, MI	T 6–6	
November 15	at Albion	Albion, MI	L 6–13	
*Non-conference game

=== Hillsdale ===
1941 Hillsdale Dales football
- Conference: Michigan Intercollegiate Athletic Association
- Record: 3–4–1 (1–3–1 MIAA)
- Head coach: Dwight Harwood (15th season)

The 1941 Hillsdale Dales football team was an American football team that represented Hillsdale College in the Michigan Intercollegiate Athletic Association (MIAA) during the 1941 college football season. In their 15th year under head coach Dwight Harwood, the Dales compiled a 3–4–1 record (1–3–1 against MIAA opponents), finished in fifth place out of six teams in the MIAA, and were outscored by a total of 89 to 51.

Brothers Bob and Burr Manby starred at the guard and fullback positions. The brothers were both named to the 1941 all-conference football team.

Paul Wright was the team captain.

Hillsdale was ranked at No. 479 (out of 681 teams) in the final rankings under the Litkenhous Difference by Score System.

Date	Opponent	Site	Result	Source
September 19	Dayton*	Dayton Stadium; Dayton, OH	L 0–62	
October 4	Kalamazoo	Kalamazoo, MI	L 0–8	
October 10	Alma	Hillsdale, MI	L 0–6	
October 18	Albion	Hillsdale, MI	T 7–7	
October 24	at Hope	Holland, MI	L 0–6	
October 31	Grand Rapids*	Hillsdale, MI	W 20–0	
November 8	at Adrian	Adrian, MI	W 14–0	
November 15	at Lawrence Tech*	Ives Field; Detroit, MI	W 20–0	
*Non-conference game

=== Adrian ===
1941 Adrian Bulldogs football
- Conference: Michigan Intercollegiate Athletic Association
- Record: 2–6 (0–5 MIAA)
- Head coach: Harve A. Oliphant (4th season)

The 1941 Adrian Bulldogs football team represented Adrian College of Adrian, Michigan. In their fourth and final year under head coach Harve A. Oliphant, the Bulldogs compiled a 2–6 record (0–5 against MIAA opponents), finished in last place out of six teams in the MIAA, and were outscored by a total of 141 to 19.

Adrian was ranked at No. 620 (out of 681 teams) in the final rankings under the Litkenhous Difference by Score System.

Date	Opponent	Site	Result	Source
October 4	Albion	Adrian, MI	L 0–12	
October 11	Ferris Institute*	Adrian, MI	W 7–6	
October 18	at Alma	Alma, MI	L 6–46	
October 24	at Findlay*	Findlay, OH	L 6–38	
November 1	at Kalamazoo	Kalamazoo, MI	L 0–19	
November 8	Hillsdale	Adrian, MI	L 0–14	
November 15	at Hope	Holland, MI	L 0–6	
*Non-conference game

== All-conference team ==
The following players were selected as first-team players on the All-MIAA football team:

- Quarterback - Bob Kirby, Alma
- Fullback - Burr Manby, Hillsdale
- Halfbacks - William Johnston, Hillsdale; Don Defouw, Hope; Jack Bockleman, Kalamazoo
- Ends - Keith Carey, Alma; Gerald Gillman, Kalamazoo
- Tackles - Edward Baklarz, Alma; Martin Bekken, Hope; J. Clay, Kalamazoo; Robert Fles, Albion
- Guards - James Hicks, Alma; Robert Manby, Hillsdale
- Center - William Tappen, Hope
