= Bill Carr (American football coach) =

American football coach

Biographical details
- Born: March 26, 1917; Alpena, Michigan, U.S.
- Died: April 2, 2006 (aged 89); Alpena, Michigan, U.S.

Coaching career (HC unless noted)
- 1963–1964: Alma

Head coaching record
- Overall: 4–13

William Eddy Carr Jr. (March 26, 1917 – April 2, 2006) was an American football coach. He was the head football coach at Alma College located in Alma, Michigan. He held that position for the 1963 and 1964 seasons. His coaching record at Alma was 4–13.

== Head coaching record ==
| Year | Team | Overall | Conference | Standing | Bowl/playoffs |
|---|---|---|---|---|---|
Alma Scots (Michigan Intercollegiate Athletic Association) (1963–1964)
| 1963 | Alma | 2–7 | 1–4 | 5th | |
| 1964 | Alma | 2–6 | 1–4 | T–4th | |
| Alma: | | 4–13 | 2–8 | | |
| Total: | | 4–13 | | | |
