= Pearl Fuller =

American football coach, mining engineer (1881–1908)

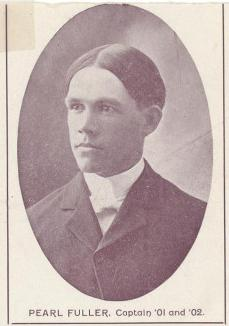

Biographical details
- Born: March 29, 1881; Alma, Michigan, U.S.
- Died: September 27, 1908 (aged 27); Virginia, Minnesota, U.S.

Playing career
- 1899–1901: Alma

Coaching career (HC unless noted)
- 1903: Alma

Head coaching record
- Overall: 3–4

Pearl Fuller (March 29, 1881 – September 27, 1908) was an American college football coach and mining engineer. He was the head football coach at Alma College in Alma, Michigan, for one season, in 1903, compiling a record of 3–4.

Fuller was born on March 29, 1881, in Alma. In 1903, he married Jennie Quick. Fuller moved, in 1904, to Minnesota, where he worked as mining engineer. He died of pneumonia on September 27, 1908, at his home in Virginia, Minnesota.

== Head coaching record ==
Year	Team	Overall	Conference	Standing	Bowl/playoffs
Alma Maroon and Cream (Michigan Intercollegiate Athletic Association) (1903)
1903	Alma	3–4	1–4		
Alma:		3–4	1–4		
Total:		3–4			
