= Lyman E. Abbott =

American football and basketball coach

Biographical details
- Born: March 1, 1912
- Died: January 17, 1981 (aged 68); Adrian, Michigan, U.S.

Coaching career (HC unless noted)

Football
- 1946–1949: Adrian

Basketball
- 1946–1950: Adrian

Head coaching record
- Overall: 12–20–1 (football); 21–63 (basketball)

Lyman E. Abbott (March 1, 1912 – January 17, 1981) was an American football and basketball coach. He was the head football coach at Adrian College in Adrian, Michigan for four seasons, from 1946 to 1949, compiling a record of 12–20–1. Abbott was also the head basketball coach at Adrian from 1946 to 1950, tallying a mark of 21–63.

== Head coaching record ==
=== Football ===
Year	Team	Overall	Conference	Standing	Bowl/playoffs
Adrian Bulldogs (Michigan Intercollegiate Athletic Association) (1946–1949)
1946	Adrian	0–8	0–5	6th	
1947	Adrian	3–5	1–4	5th	
1948	Adrian	5–4	2–3	T–4th	
1949	Adrian	4–3–1	2–2–1	T–3rd	
Adrian:		12–20–1	5–14–1		
Total:		12–20–1			
