= Chester S. Barnard =

American football player and sports coach (1894–1952)

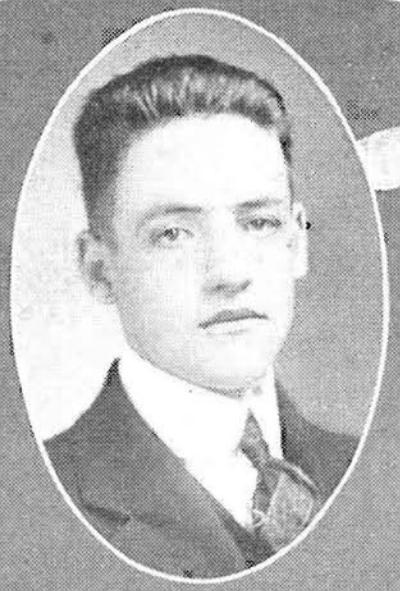
- Barnard pictured in Ozarko 1916, Missouri State yearbook (while attending the college)

Biographical details
- Born: October 25, 1894; Rogersville, Missouri, U.S.
- Died: October 16, 1952 (aged 57); Jackson Township, Maries County, Missouri, U.S.

Playing career

Football
- 1915–1917: Springfield Normal
- 1918: Great Lakes Navy
- 1919: Northwestern

Basketball
- 1914–1918: Springfield Normal
- Position: End (football)

Coaching career (HC unless noted)

Football
- 1924: Ole Miss
- 1925–1941: Kalamazoo
- c. 1950: Missouri Mines (assistant)

Basketball
- 1925–1942: Kalamazoo

Baseball
- 1926–1928: Kalamazoo

Track
- c. 1920–1924: Springfield (MO)

Swimming
- c. 1950: Missouri Mines

Head coaching record
- Overall: 67–59–17 (football); 180–154 (basketball)

Accomplishments and honors

Championships
- Football; 4 MIAA (1930, 1934, 1936–1937)

Chester Smith Barnard (October 25, 1894 – October 16, 1952) was an American football player and coach of football and basketball. He served as the head football coach at the University of Mississippi in 1924 and at Kalamazoo College from 1925 to 1941, compiling a career college football record of 67–59–17. He was a twin brother of Lester Barnard.

== Coaching career ==
Barnard was the head football coach at Kalamazoo College in Kalamazoo, Michigan. He held that position for 17 seasons, from 1925 until 1941. His coaching record at Kalamazoo was 63–54–17. Barnard left Kalamazoo in 1942 to join the United States Navy.

== Death ==
Barnard committed suicide in 1952 by drowning in the Gasconade River.

== Head coaching record ==
=== Football ===
Year	Team	Overall	Conference	Standing	Bowl/playoffs
Ole Miss Rebels (Southern Conference) (1924)
1924	Ole Miss	4–5	0–3	T–19th	
Ole Miss:		4–5	0–3		
Kalamazoo Hornets (Michigan Intercollegiate Athletic Association) (1925–1941)
1925	Kalamazoo	5–2–1	2–2–1	3rd	
1926	Kalamazoo	3–4–1	2–3	T–2nd	
1927	Kalamazoo	3–5	2–3	T–3rd	
1928	Kalamazoo	3–3–2	3–1–1	2nd	
1929	Kalamazoo	1–4–3	0–3–2	6th	
1930	Kalamazoo	5–3	4–1	T–1st	
1931	Kalamazoo	5–4	2–3	4th	
1932	Kalamazoo	4–3–1	1–2–1	4th	
1933	Kalamazoo	3–2–2	1–1–2	T–2nd	
1934	Kalamazoo	3–3–1	2–1–1	T–1st	
1935	Kalamazoo	2–3–2	2–1–1	2nd	
1936	Kalamazoo	7–0–1	7–0–1	1st	
1937	Kalamazoo	7–1	4–0	1st	
1938	Kalamazoo	3–4–1	1–2–1	T–3rd	
1939	Kalamazoo	3–5	3–3	4th	
1940	Kalamazoo	1–6–1	0–5	6th	
1941	Kalamazoo	5–2–1	2–2–1	4th	
Kalamazoo:		63–54–17	38–33–12		
Total:		67–59–17			
National championship Conference title Conference division title or championship game berth
