= Gordon MacDonald (American football) =

American football and basketball player and coach (1902–1950)

- MacDonald (right) with a college bagpiper in 1936

Biographical details
- Born: January 8, 1902; West Bay City, Michigan, U.S.
- Died: August 29, 1950 (aged 48); Trinidad, Colorado, U.S.

Playing career
- 1923–1925: Alma
- Position: Fullback

Coaching career (HC unless noted)

Football
- 1927–1935: Traverse City HS (MI)
- 1936–1943: Alma

Basketball
- 1936–1943: Alma

Head coaching record
- Overall: 33–22–5 (college football)

Accomplishments and honors

Championships
- Football; 2 MIAA (1941–1942)

Gordon Addison MacDonald Sr. (January 8, 1902 – August 29, 1950) was an American football and basketball player and coach. He served as the head football coach at Alma College from 1936 to 1943, compiling a record of 33–22–5. MacDonald played football and basketball at Alma, from which he graduated in 1926. In 1929, he married Eleanor Musselman.

== Coaching career ==
MacDonald was the head football coach at Alma College in Alma, Michigan, for eight seasons, from 1936 until 1943. His coaching record at Alma was 33–22–5.

== Death ==
MacDonald died in Colorado on August 29, 1950, in a hospital after a "long illness".

== Head coaching record ==
=== College football ===
Year	Team	Overall	Conference	Standing	Bowl/playoffs
Alma Scots (Michigan Intercollegiate Athletic Association) (1936–1943)
1936	Alma	5–2–1	5–2–1	T–2nd	
1937	Alma	4–4–1	2–2	T–2nd	
1938	Alma	3–4–1	1–2–1	T–3rd	
1939	Alma	2–5–1	2–3–1	5th	
1940	Alma	5–2	4–1	2nd	
1941	Alma	6–0–1	4–0–1	1st	
1942	Alma	7–0	4–0	1st	
1943	Alma	1–5	NA	NA	
Alma:		59–48–10	22–10–4		
Total:		74–60–13			
National championship Conference title Conference division title or championship game berth
