= Harve A. Oliphant =

American football coach

Biographical details
- Born: July 7, 1912; Indiana, U.S.
- Died: February 20, 1998 (aged 85); Silver City, New Mexico, U.S.

Coaching career (HC unless noted)

Football
- 1938–1941: Adrian

Basketball
- 1938–1942: Adrian

Head coaching record
- Overall: 5–26–1 (football); 15–51 (basketball)

Harvey Andrew "Harve" Oliphant Jr. (July 7, 1912 – February 20, 1998) was an American football coach. Oliphant was the head football coach at Adrian College in Adrian, Michigan for four seasons, from 1938 to 1941, compiling a record of 5–26–1. He was also the head basketball coach at Adrian from 1938 to 1942, tallying a mark of 15–51.

Oliphant was inducted into the Western New Mexico University Hall of Fame in 1994.

== Head coaching record ==
=== Football ===
Year	Team	Overall	Conference	Standing	Bowl/playoffs
Adrian Bulldogs (Michigan Intercollegiate Athletic Association) (1938–1941)
1938	Adrian	0–7–1	0–6	7th	
1939	Adrian	2–6	1–5	6th	
1940	Adrian	1–7	1–4	5th	
1941	Adrian	2–6	0–5	6th	
Adrian:		5–26–1	2–20		
Total:		5–26–1			
