= Dale R. Sprankle =

American sports coach (1898–1963)

Biographical details
- Born: August 4, 1898; Beach City, Ohio, U.S.
- Died: November 11, 1963 (aged 65); Albion, Michigan, U.S.

Playing career

Football
- c. 1920: Mount Union

Basketball
- c. 1920: Mount Union

Baseball
- c. 1920: Mount Union

Coaching career (HC unless noted)

Football
- 1923–1935: Adrian
- 1936–1946: Albion

Basketball
- 1923–1936: Adrian

Baseball
- 1924–1929: Adrian

Head coaching record
- Overall: 91–85–12 (football); 130–122 (basketball); 24–40–1 (baseball)

Accomplishments and honors

Championships
- Football; 6 MOCC (1930–1935); 2 MIAA (1939–1940)

Dale Reese Sprankle (August 4, 1898 – November 11, 1963) was an American sports coach and athletic director at both Adrian College and Albion College in Michigan. Over the course of his 35-year career, Sprankle won 23 Michigan Intercollegiate Athletic Association (MIAA) conference championships in four sports, making him one of the winningest coaches in that conference's history.

== Early life ==
Sprankle was born on August 4, 1898, in Beach City, Ohio. He was the younger brother of LeRoy Sprankle, who would also become an athletics icon, most notably in Eastern Tennessee and South Florida. At the age of 12, his family moved to Canton, Ohio, where he participated in athletics and attended high school. Upon graduation, Sprankle completed his education at the nearby Mount Union College.

== Coaching career ==
In 1923, Sprankle was hired as the director of physical education (athletic director) at Adrian College in Adrian, Michigan. From 1923 to 1936, he was the head coach of basketball, cross country, football, and track and field at the college, compiling a 55–51–8 record in football and a .516 winning percentage in basketball. In 1936, he left to become the assistant athletic director and head coach of cross country, football, and indoor and outdoor track at Albion College. Five years later, Sprankle was promoted to athletic director, the position from which he served at the college until his retirement in 1958. Over the course of the 22 years he coached at Albion, his teams won 23 Michigan Intercollegiate Athletic Association (MIAA) championships which is currently tied for seventh all-time in that conference. In the nine seasons that he coached football, between 1936 and 1946, the team went 36–33–4 and won two MIAA championships. In indoor track, Sprankle coached the team for five years and won MIAA championships in each. His outdoor track team also had great success, winning six MIAA championships over the course of eight years. Sprankle's greatest success, however, came with the cross country team, which won 10 MIAA championships in his 12 years of coaching, from 1947 to 1958. In 1958, due to declining health, he retired from his position, but still kept up a close relationship with the school. Sprankle died on November 11, 1963, at the age of 65, following a four-year illness. In 1976, the football stadium at Albion College was renamed Sprankle-Sprandel Stadium in honor of the school's two greatest sports coaches. Thirteen years later, in 1989, Sprankle was inducted into the Albion College Sports Hall of Fame.

== Notable players coached ==
Name	Graduation year: sports	Achievements after college
Louis Black	1949: cross country, basketball, football	Played professional basketball with the Detroit Vagabond Kings (NBL)
James L. Chapman	1956: cross country, track	President of West Liberty State College (1970–84)
Theodore E. Hagadone	1951: cross country, track	Superintendent of schools in Vanderbilt, Iron Mountain, Milford, and Riverview, Michigan
Lewis F. Moon	1948: baseball, basketball, football, track	Played with Cardinal's minor league franchise, AD at Lawrence Tech (1964–89)
Gary R. Noble	1957: cross country, track	Rhodes Scholar, deputy director at the CDC, asst. surgeon general in the U.S. Public Health Service
Raymond A. Wauthier	1946: basketball, football	head baseball and basketball coach at Iowa Wesleyan College (1946–48), head baseball and golf coach at Kansas State (1949–86)

== Head coaching record ==
=== Football ===
Year	Team	Overall	Conference	Standing	Bowl/playoffs
Adrian Bulldogs (Independent) (1923–1929)
1923	Adrian	4–4			
1924	Adrian	6–1–2			
1925	Adrian	6–3			
1926	Adrian	4–4–1			
1927	Adrian	2–5–1			
1928	Adrian	5–3			
1929	Adrian	1–7–1			
Adrian Bulldogs (Michigan-Ontario Collegiate Conference) (1930–1935)
1930	Adrian	5–4		1st	
1931	Adrian	5–4	4–0	1st	
1932	Adrian	2–6–1	2–0–1	T–1st	
1933	Adrian	5–3–1		T–1st	
1934	Adrian	3–5–1		1st	
1935	Adrian	7–3	3–0	1st	
Adrian:		55–52–8			
Albion Britons (Michigan Intercollegiate Athletic Association) (1936–1946)
1936	Albion	2–5–2	2–4–2	4th	
1937	Albion	4–4	1–3	T–4th	
1938	Albion	5–2–1	2–1–1	2nd	
1939	Albion	7–1	6–0	1st	
1940	Albion	7–1	5–0	1st	
1941	Albion	3–4–1	3–1–1	2nd	
1942	Albion	4–4	2–2	T–2nd	
1943	No team—World War II				
1944	No team—World War II				
1945	Albion	1–7			
1946	Albion	3–5	2–3	T–4th	
Albion:		36–33–4	23–14–4		
Total:		91–85–12			
National championship Conference title Conference division title or championship game berth
