= Alma Scots men's basketball =

Sports program

- University: Alma College
- First season: 1911; 115 years ago
- Head coach: Mike Fitzpatrick (1st season)
- Arena: Art Smith Arena (capacity: 2,430)
- Conference: Michigan Intercollegiate Athletic Association; III Division
- Nickname: Scots
- Colors: Maroon and cream
- All-time record: 987–1,231 (.445)

NCAA Division I tournament Elite Eight
- 2016
Other NCAA Division I tournament results
Sweet Sixteen	2016
Appearances	2016

Conference tournament champions
- 2016

Conference regular-season champions
- 1911, 1918, 1924, 1925, 1933, 1934, 1941, 1942, 1978

The Alma Scots men's basketball program represents Alma College in men's basketball at the NCAA Division III level. They compete in the Michigan Intercollegiate Athletic Association (MIAA).

== History ==
Season	MIAA	Overall	Coach	Postseason
14-15	9-5	11-15	Sam Hargraves	Lost to Calvin in MIAA semifinals.
15-16	12-2	24-7	Sam Hargraves	Lost to Benedictine in Elite Eight.
16-17	8-6	12-14	Sam Hargraves	Lost to Hope in MIAA semifinals.
17-18	5-9	8-17	Sam Hargraves	none
18-19	4-10	5-21	Sam Hargraves	Lost to Olivet in MIAA quarterfinals.
19-20	7-7	13-13	Ryan Clark	Lost to Trine in MIAA semifinals.
20-21	0-6	2-12	Ryan Clark	Lost to Trine in MIAA quarterfinals.
21-22	4-10	5-19	Ryan Clark	Lost to Calvin in MIAA quarterfinals.
22-23	1-3	4-11	Mike Fitzpatrick	

=== All MIAA athletes ===
Cole Kleiver - 20-21; 21-22.
