= List of Kalamazoo Hornets head football coaches =

The Kalamazoo Hornets football program is a college football team that represents Kalamazoo College as a member of the Michigan Intercollegiate Athletic Association (MIAA) at the NCAA Division III level. Kalamazoo has had 26 head coaches since its first recorded football game in 1892. The team's current head coach is John Krajacic, who was hired after the 2025 season.

== Key ==
Key to symbols in coaches list
General		Overall		Conference		Postseason (Note: Although the first Rose Bowl Game was played in 1902, it has been continuously played since the 1916 game, and is recognized as the oldest bowl game by the NCAA. "—" indicates any season prior to 1916 when postseason games were not played.)	
No.	Order of coaches (Note: A running total of the number of head coaches, with coaches who served separate tenures being counted only once. Interim head coaches are represented with "Int" and are not counted in the running total. "—" indicates the team played but either without a coach or no coach is on record. "X" indicates an interim year without play.)	GC	Games coached	CW	Conference wins	PW	Postseason wins
DC	Division championships	OW	Overall wins	CL	Conference losses	PL	Postseason losses
CC	Conference championships	OL	Overall losses	CT	Conference ties	PT	Postseason ties
NC	National championships	OT	Overall ties (Note: Overtime rules in college football were introduced in 1996, making ties impossible in the period since.)	C%	Conference winning percentage		
†	Elected to the College Football Hall of Fame	O%	Overall winning percentage (Note: When computing the win–loss percentage, a tie counts as half a win and half a loss.)				

== Coaches ==
Statistics updated through the 2025 season:

No.	Name	Term	GC	OW	OL	OT	O%	CW	CL	CT	C%	PW	PL	CCs	NCs	Awards
0	No coach	1892–1896	14	6	7	1	.464	2	1	0	.667	—	—	—	—	
1	Charles Hall	1897–1900	28	21	4	3	.804	17	1	0	.944	—	—	3	—	
2	Maurice Waterbury	1901	8	2	5	1	.313	2	5	1	.286	—	—	—	—	
3	LeRoy Hornbeck	1902	9	3	5	1	.389	0	5	0	.000	—	—	—	—	
4	Joseph Rowe	1903	8	6	2	0	.750	5	2	0	.714	—	—	—	—	
5	Wesley Clapp	1904	7	1	6	0	.143	1	5	0	.167	—	—	—	—	
6	Rufus Gilbert	1905, 1907–1908	25	5	19	1	.220	3	12	1	.219	—	—	—	—	
7	Maurice Post	1906	5	1	3	1	.300	0	3	1	.125	—	—	—	—	
8	Van Ward	1909	6	2	3	1	.417	2	2	0	.500	—	—	—	—	
9	Ivan Doseff	1910	7	1	4	1	.250	0	3	1	.125	—	—	—	—	
10	E. J. Mather	1911–1915	25	13	12	0	.520	6	12	0	.333	—	—	—	—	
11	Ralph H. Young	1916–1917, 1919–1922	51	33	16	2	.667	20	3	1	.854	—	—	2	—	
12	Paul Staake	1918	3	1	2	0	.333	0	0	0	–	—	—	—	—	
13	Maynard Street	1923–1924	18	2	16	0	.111	0	10	0	.000	—	—	—	—	
14	Chester S. Barnard	1925–1941	134	63	54	17	.534	38	33	12	.611	—	—	4	—	
15	Bob Nulf	1942–1948	32	18	10	4	.625	12	4	3	.711	—	—	2	—	
16	Lloyd Grow	1949–1952	33	12	20	1	.379	9	1	0}	.450	—	—	—	—	
17	Rolla Anderson	1953–1966	113	56	56	1	.500	38	38	1	.500	—	—	2	—	
18	Ed Baker	1967–1983, 1988–1989	156	62	89	5	.413	29	63	3	.321	—	—	—	—	
19	Bob Kent	1984	9	1	8	0	.111	0	5	0	.000	—	—	—	—	
20	Jim Heath	1985–1987	27	3	24	0	.111	2	13	0	.133	—	—	—	—	
21	Dave Warmack	1990–1997	72	33	38	1	.465	16	23	1	.413	—	—	—	—	
22	Tim Rogers	1998–2003	56	28	28	0	.500	12	22	0	.353	—	—	—	—	
23	Van Nickert	2004	10	1	9	0	.100	0	7	0	.000	—	—	—	—	
24	Terrance Brooks	2005–2007	28	7	21	0	.250	5	16	0	.238	—	—	—	—	
25	Jamie Zorbo	2008–2025	172	59	113	0	.343	23	85	0	.213	—	—	—	—	
26	John Krajacic	2026–present	0	0	0	0	–	0	0	0	–	—	—	—	—	
