= 1994 Michigan Intercollegiate Athletic Association football season =

- League: Michigan Intercollegiate Athletic Association
- Teams: 6
- Champion: Albion

Football seasons

1994 Michigan Intercollegiate Athletic Association football standings
	Conf.					Overall
Team	W		L		T	W		L		T
Albion $^	5	–	0	–	0	13	–	0	–	0
Alma	4	–	1	–	0	8	–	1	–	0
Hope	2	–	3	–	0	4	–	4	–	1
Kalamazoo	2	–	3	–	0	4	–	5	–	0
Adrian	2	–	3	–	0	3	–	6	–	0
Olivet	0	–	5	–	0	1	–	8	–	0
$ – Conference champion; ^ – NCAA Division III playoff participant

The 1994 Michigan Intercollegiate Athletic Association football season was the season of college football played by the six member schools of the Michigan Intercollegiate Athletic Association (MIAA) as part of the 1994 NCAA Division III football season.

The Albion Britons, in their 12th season under head coach Pete Schmidt, won the MIAA championship with a perfect 13–0 record, including a 5–0 mark against MIAA opponents, and won the NCAA Division III football championship.

== Conference overview ==
Conf. rank	Team	Head coach	Conf. record	Overall record	Points scored	Points against
1	Albion	Pete Schmidt	5–0	13–0	459	171
2	Alma	Jim Cole	4–1	8–1	189	107
3 (tie)	Hope	Ray Smith	2–3	4–4–1	159	123
3 (tie)	Kalamazoo	Dave Warmack	2–3	4–5	159	205
3 (tie)	Adrian	Jim Lyall	2–3	3–6	135	223
6	Olivet	Dallas Hilliar	0–5	1–8	144	253

== Teams ==
=== Albion ===
1994 Albion Britons football

NCAA Division III champion

Stagg Bowl, W 38–15 vs. Washington & Jefferson
- Conference: Michigan Intercollegiate Athletic Association
- Record: 13–0 (5–0 MIAA)
- Head coach: Pete Schmidt (12th season)
- Home stadium: Sprankle-Sprandel Stadium

The 1994 Albion Britons football team was an American football team that represented Albion College as a member of the Michigan Intercollegiate Athletic Association (MIAA) during the 1994 NCAA Division III football season. In their 12th season under head coach Pete Schmidt, the Britons compiled a perfect 13–0 record and won the MIAA championship. It was Albion's sixth consecutive MIAA championship.

The team participated in the NCAA Division III playoffs where they defeated Augustana (Illinois) in the first round, Mount Union in the North Region final, Saint John's (Minnesota) in the semifinal, and Washington & Jefferson in the national championship game.

The team was led on offense by tailback Jeff Robinson who gained 1,708 yards during the 1994 season, including 1,273 in the regular season.

The team played its home games at Sprankle-Sprandel Stadium in Albion, Michigan.

Date	Opponent	Site	Result	Attendance	Source
September 3	at Wilmington (OH)*	Wilmington, OH	W 44–20		
September 10	Aurora*	Sprankle-Sprandel Stadium; Albion, MI	W 27–0		
September 17	at Wabash*	Crawfordsville, IN	W 14–7		
September 24	DePauw*	Sprankle-Sprandel Stadium; Albion, MI	W 35–14		
October 8	Adrian	Sprankle-Sprandel Stadium; Albion, MI	W 60–18		
October 15	at Olivet	Griswold Field; Olivet, MI	W 65–8		
October 22	Hope	Sprankle-Sprandel Stadium; Albion, MI	W 35–12		
October 29	at Alma	Alma, MI	W 26–0		
November 5	at Kalamazoo	Kalamazoo, MI	W 34–7		
November 19	Augustana (IL)*	Sprankle-Sprandel Stadium; Albion, MI (North Region first round)	W 28–21	3,500	
November 26	Mount Union*	Sprankle-Sprandel Stadium; Albion, MI (North Region final)	W 34–33	3,700	
December 3	at Saint John's (MN)*	Collegeville, MN (NCAA Division III semifinal)	W 19–16	5,053	
December 10	vs. Washington & Jefferson*	Salem, VA (Stagg Bowl)	W 38–15	7,168	
*Non-conference game

=== Alma ===
1994 Alma Scots football
- Conference: Michigan Intercollegiate Athletic Association
- Record: 8–1 (4–1 MIAA)
- Head coach: Jim Cole (4th season)

The 1994 Alma Scots football team represented Alma College of Alma, Michigan. In their fourth year under head coach Jim Cole, the Scots compiled an 8–1 record (4–1 against MIAA opponents), finished in second place in the MIAA, and outscored opponents by a total of 189 to 107.

Date	Opponent	Site	Result	Attendance	Source
September 10	at Olivet Nazarene*	Bourbonnais, IL	W 42–14		
September 17	Elmhurst*	Alma, MI	W 28–7		
September 24	Franklin*	Alma, MI	W 30–6		
October 1	at Benedictine (IL)*	Lisle, IL	W 24–10		
October 8	Olivet	Alma, MI	W 7–6		
October 15	at Hope	Holland, MI	W 10–6		
October 22	at Kalamazoo	Kalamazoo, MI	W 28–14		
October 29	Albion	Alma, MI	L 0–26		
November 5	at Adrian	Adrian, MI	W 20–18		
*Non-conference game

=== Hope ===
1994 Hope Flying Dutchmen football
- Conference: Michigan Intercollegiate Athletic Association
- Record: 4–4–1 (2–3 MIAA)
- Head coach: Ray Smith (25th season)

The 1994 Hope Flying Dutchmen football team represented Hope College of Hope, Michigan. In their 25th and final year under head coach Ray Smith, the Dutchmen compiled a 4–4–1 record (2–3 against MIAA opponents), tied for third place in the MIAA, and outscored opponents by a total of 159 to 123.

Date	Opponent	Site	Result	Attendance	Source
September 10	at Wheaton*	Wheaton, IL	L 21–24		
September 17	at DePauw*	Greencastle, IN	W 19–0		
September 24	Wabash*	Holland, MI	W 24–7		
October 1	at Aurora*	Aurora, IL	T 3–3		
October 8	at Kalamazoo	Kalamazoo, MI	W 20–14		
October 15	Alma	Holland, MI	L 6–10		
October 22	at Albion	Albion, MI	L 12–35		
October 29	Adrian	Holland, MI	L 13–14		
November 5	Olivet	Holland, MI	W 41–16		
*Non-conference game

=== Kalamazoo ===
1994 Kalamazoo Hornets football
- Conference: Michigan Intercollegiate Athletic Association
- Record: 4–5 (2–3 MIAA)
- Head coach: Dave Warmack (5th season)
- Home stadium: Angell Field

The 1994 Kalamazoo Hornets football team represented Kalamazoo College of Kalamazoo, Michigan. In their fifth year under head coach Dave Warmack, the Hornets compiled a 4–5 record (2–3 against MIAA opponents), tied for third place in the MIAA, and were outscored by a total of 205 to 159.

Date	Opponent	Site	Result	Attendance	Source
September 10	at Wooster*	Wooster, OH	W 34–0		
September 17	at Franklin*	Franklin, IN	L 14–32		
September 24	at Valparaiso*	Valparaiso, IN	L 10–45		
October 1	Chicago*	Kalamazoo, MI	W 16–14		
October 8	Hope	Kalamazoo, MI	L 14–20		
October 15	at Adrian	Adrian, MI	W 21–8		
October 22	Alma	Kalamazoo, MI	L 14–28		
October 29	at Olivet	Olivet, MI	W 29–24		
November 5	Albion	Kalamazoo, MI	L 7–34		
*Non-conference game

=== Adrian ===
1994 Adrian Bulldogs football
- Conference: Michigan Intercollegiate Athletic Association
- Record: 3–6 (2–3 MIAA)
- Head coach: Ron Labadie (10th season)

The 1994 Adrian Bulldogs football team represented Adrian College of Adrian, Michigan. In their tenth year under head coach Ron Labadie, the Bulldogs compiled a 3–6 record (2–3 against MIAA opponents), tied for third place in the MIAA, and were outscored by a total of 223 to 135.

Date	Opponent	Site	Result	Attendance	Source
September 10	at Heidelberg*	Tiffin, OH	L 8–31		
September 17	Defiance*	Adrian, MI	L 14–34		
September 24	at Augustana (IL)*	Rock Island, IL	L 7–19		
October 1	Wilmington (OH)*	Adrian, MI	W 35–25		
October 8	at Albion	Albion, MI	L 18–60		
October 15	Kalamazoo	Adrian, MI	L 8–21		
October 22	Olivet	Adrian, MI	W 13–0		
October 29	at Hope	Holland, MI	W 14–13		
November 5	Alma	Adrian, MI	L 18–20		
*Non-conference game

=== Olivet ===
1994 Olivet Comets football
- Conference: Michigan Intercollegiate Athletic Association
- Record: 1–8 (0–5 MIAA)
- Head coach: Dallas Hilliar (2nd season)

The 1994 Olivet Comets football team represented Olivet College of Olivet, Michigan. In their second year under head coach Dallas Hilliar, the Comets compiled a 1–8 record (0–5 against MIAA opponents), finished in last place in the MIAA, and were outscored by a total of 253 to 144.

Date	Opponent	Site	Result	Attendance	Source
September 10	at Manchester (IN)*	North Manchester, IN	W 19–0		
September 17	Anderson (IN)*	Olivet, MI	L 21–34		
September 24	at Ohio Wesleyan*	Delaware, OH	L 13–25		
October 1	Defiance*	Olivet, MI	L 37–38		
October 8	at Alma	Alma, MI	L 6–7		
October 15	Albion	Griswold Field; Olivet, MI	L 8–65		
October 22	at Adrian	Adrian, MI	L 0–13		
October 29	Kalamazoo	Olivet, MI	L 24–29		
November 5	at Hope	Holland, MI	L 16–41		
*Non-conference game
