= Jim Heath =

Jim Heath most often refers to:

- James R. Heath, chemist (born 1962)
- The Reverend Horton Heat, musician (born 1959)

Jim Heath may also refer to:

- James Heath (historian) (1629–1664), English royalist historian
- James Heath (golfer) (born 1983), English golfer
- Sir James Heath, 1st Baronet (1852–1942), British Conservative Member of Parliament
- James Heath (engraver) (1757–1834), English engraver
- Jamey Heath (active since 1997), Canadian political activist
- James E. Heath (active since 1834), first editor of the Southern Literary Messenger
- James Heath (boxer) (born 1960), American boxer
- James P. Heath (1777–1854), U.S. congressman from Maryland
- Jimmy Heath (1926–2020), American jazz musician
- Jim Heath (American football) (born 1956), former American football player and coach
- Jim Heath, a character in 1925 American film serial Ace of Spades
