= Staake =

Staake /stæk/ is a surname. Notable people with the surname include:

- Bob Staake (born 1957), American illustrator, cartoonist, children's book author, and designer
- Paul Staake (1898–1971), American football coach and college administrator
- Ryan Staake (born 1984), American director
