= Jim Cole (American football) =

American football player and coach (born 1952)

Biographical details
- Born: October 26, 1952 (age 74)

Playing career
- 1970–1972: Alma
- Position: Quarterback

Coaching career (HC unless noted)
- 1974: Central Michigan (GA)
- 1982–1989: Alma (assistant)
- 1990: Central Michigan (volunteer)
- 1991–2011: Alma

Head coaching record
- Overall: 114–90
- Tournaments: 0–3 (NCAA D-III playoffs)

Accomplishments and honors

Championships
- 3 MIAA (1999, 2002, 2004)

Jim Cole (born October 26, 1952) is an American former college football player and coach. He served as the head football coach at Alma College in Alma, Michigan from 1991 to 2011, compiling a record of 114–90.

== Playing career ==
Cole played quarterback at the Alma College in Alma, Michigan. He was named all-conference and all-district quarterback for the Scots.

== Coaching career ==
=== Assistant coaching ===
Cole was a graduate assistant at the Central Michigan University during the Chippewas' national championship season in 1974. He also spent his time coaching as an assistant at the Alma and as a head coach in the high school ranks.

=== Alma ===
Cole was the head football coach for the Alma. He assumed the role in 1991 after working as an assistant coach for eight years under Phil Brooks. Cole's coaching record at Alma was 114–90.

Cole has also coached the women's track teams at Alma. His teams won or shared seven straight MIAA titles from 1985 to 1991.

== Head coaching record ==
=== College ===
Year	Team	Overall	Conference	Standing	Bowl/playoffs
Alma Scots (Michigan Intercollegiate Athletic Association) (1991–2011)
1991	Alma	5–4	1–4	T–5th	
1992	Alma	3–6	1–4	T–5th	
1993	Alma	2–7	2–3	4th	
1994	Alma	8–1	4–1	2nd	
1995	Alma	6–3	3–2	T–2nd	
1996	Alma	4–5	2–3	T–3rd	
1997	Alma	6–3	3–2	T–3rd	
1998	Alma	5–4	3–3	T–3rd	
1999	Alma	8–2	5–1	T–1st	L NCAA Division III First Round
2000	Alma	6–4	3–2	T–2nd	
2001	Alma	6–4	3–2	3rd	
2002	Alma	9–2	6–0	1st	L NCAA Division III First Round
2003	Alma	6–4	3–3	T–4th	
2004	Alma	8–3	6–1	1st	L NCAA Division III First Round
2005	Alma	6–4	4–3	T–4th	
2006	Alma	6–4	5–2	T–2nd	
2007	Alma	5–5	5–2	3rd	
2008	Alma	5–5	3–3	T–3rd	
2009	Alma	5–5	3–3	T–4th	
2010	Alma	3–7	2–4	T–5th	
2011	Alma	2–8	1–5	T–5th	
Alma:		114–90	68–53		
Total:		114–90			
National championship Conference title Conference division title or championship game berth
