= Kalamazoo Baptists football, 1910–1919 =

American college football seasons

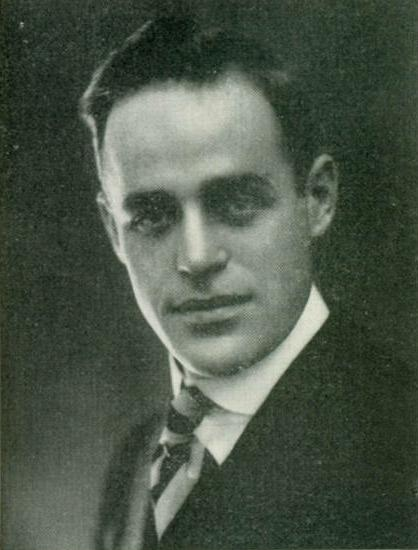
Ivan Doseff

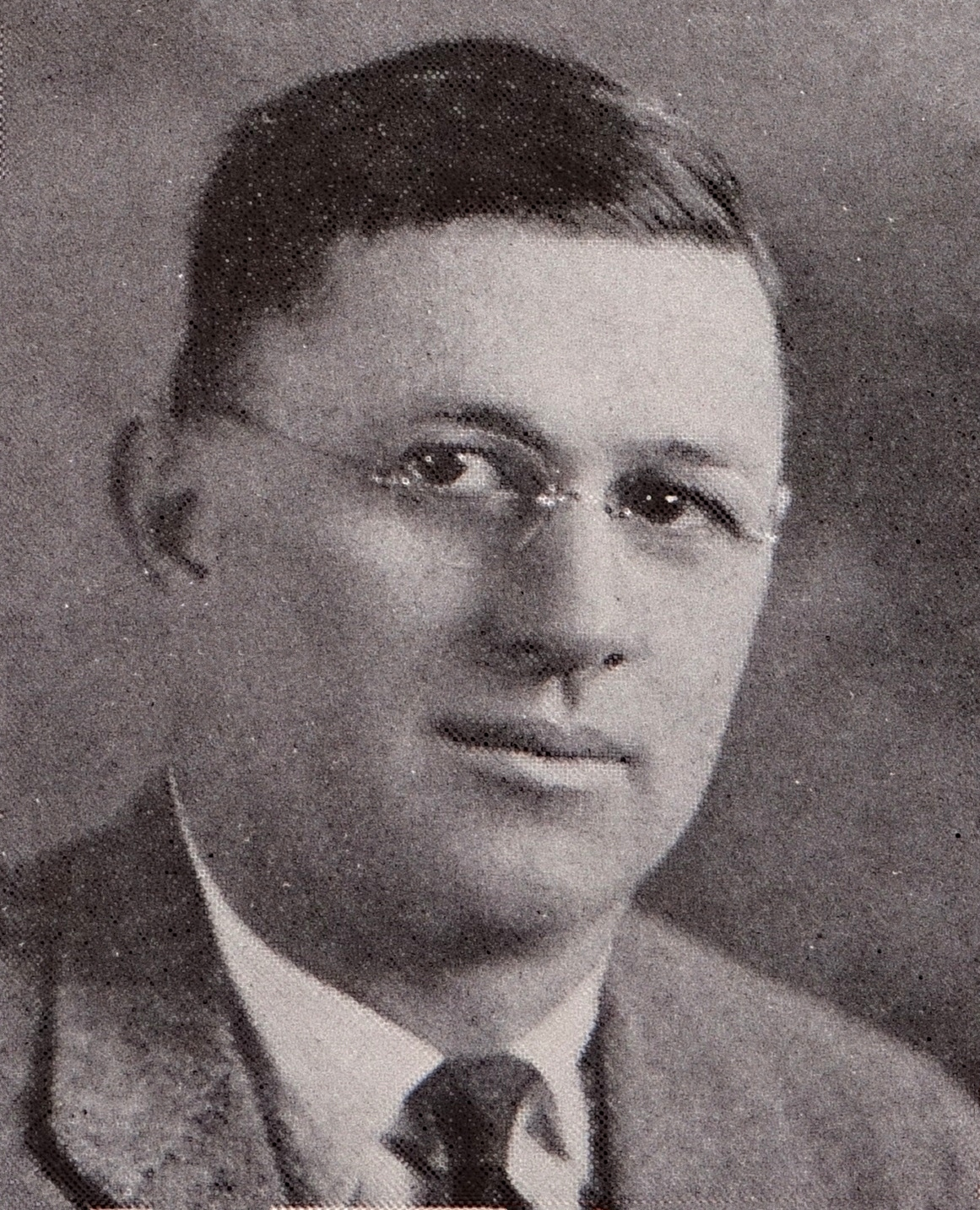
E. J. Mather

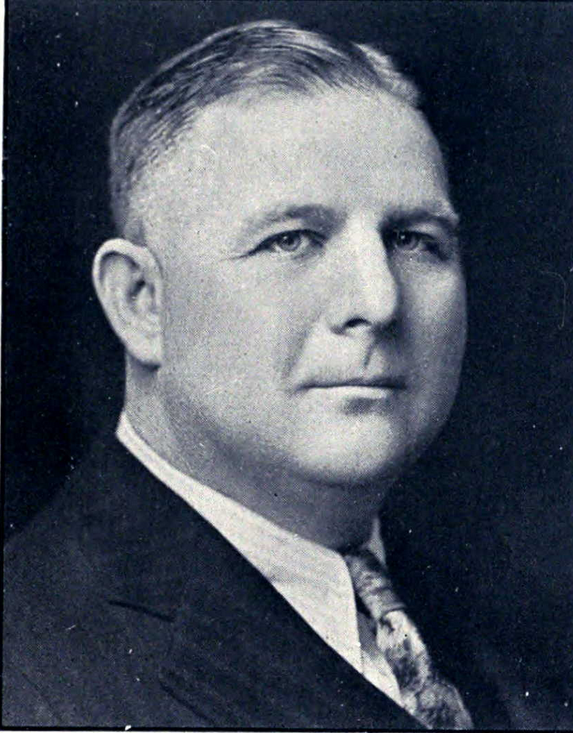
Ralph H. Young

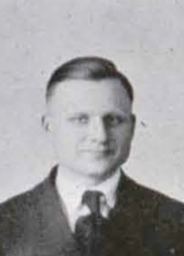
Paul Staake

Kalamazoo Baptists football head coaches, 1910–1919

The Kalamazoo Baptists football program, 1910–1919 (also referred to as the Kalamazoo Orange and Black, later known as the Kalamazoo Hornets) represented Kalamazoo College in American football during the school's third decade of college football. The team competed as a member of the Michigan Intercollegiate Athletic Association (MIAA). Highlights of the decade include the following:

- The 1916 Kalamazoo Baptists football team enjoyed a perfect season with a 7–0 record and won the MIAA championship. The team also set a school scoring record with a 108–0 victory over Grand Rapids Veterinary.
- The 1919 Kalamazoo Baptists football team compiled a 5–2 record (4–0 in conference games) and won the MIAA championship.

Kalamazoo's head coaches during the 1910s were Ivan Doseff (1910), E. J. Mather (1911–1915), Ralph H. Young (1916–1917, 1919), and Paul Staake (1918). Mather later served as the head basketball coach at the University of Michigan from 1919 to 1928. Young later served as Michigan State University's athletic director from 1923 to 1954 and head football coach from 1923 to 1927.

== 1910 ==
1910 Kalamazoo Baptists football
- Conference: Michigan Intercollegiate Athletic Association
- Record: 1–4–1 (0–3–1 MIAA)
- Head coach: Ivan Doseff (1st season)

The 1910 Kalamazoo Baptists football team, also known as the Kalamazoo Orange and Black, represented Kalamazoo College in the Michigan Intercollegiate Athletic Association (MIAA) during the 1910 college football season. In their first and only year under head coach Ivan Doseff, the Baptists compiled a 1–4–1 record (0–3–1 in conference games) and finished in fourth place in the MIAA.

=== Schedule ===
Date	Opponent	Site	Result	Source
October 8	Albion	Kalamazoo, MI	L 6–24	
October 15	at Hillsdale	Hillsdale, MI	T 0–0	
October 22	Olivet	Kalamazoo, MI	L 6–66	
November 5	at Hope*	Holland, MI	W 10–6	
November 12	Michigan freshmen*		L 0–66	
November 18	Albion	Winter-Lau Field; Albion, MI	L 5–20	
*Non-conference game

== 1911 ==
1911 Kalamazoo Baptists football
- Conference: Michigan Intercollegiate Athletic Association
- Record: 2–2 (0–2 MIAA)
- Head coach: E. J. Mather (1st season)

The 1911 Kalamazoo Baptists football team, also known as the Kalamazoo Orange and Black, represented Kalamazoo College in the Michigan Intercollegiate Athletic Association (MIAA) during the 1911 college football season. In their first year under head coach E. J. Mather, the Baptists compiled a 2–2 record (0–2 in conference games) and finished in fourth place in the MIAA.

=== Schedule ===
Date	Opponent	Site	Result	Source
October 7	Olivet	Kalamazoo College campus; Kalamazoo, MI	L 3–28	
October 21	at Detroit*	D. A. C. Field; Detroit, MI	W 8–6	
October 28	at Hope*	Holland, MI	W 8–0	
November 11	at Albion	Winter-Lau Field; Albion, MI	L 5–19	
*Non-conference game

== 1912 ==
1912 Kalamazoo Baptists football
- Conference: Michigan Intercollegiate Athletic Association
- Record: 2–3 (1–3 MIAA)
- Head coach: E. J. Mather (2nd season)

The 1912 Kalamazoo Baptists football team, also known as the Kalamazoo Orange and Black, represented Kalamazoo College in the Michigan Intercollegiate Athletic Association (MIAA) during the 1912 college football season. In their second year under head coach E. J. Mather, the Baptists compiled a 2–3 record (1–3 in conference games) and finished in a tie for fourth place in the MIAA.

=== Schedule ===
Date	Time	Opponent	Site	Result	Source
October 5		at Olivet	Olivet, MI	L 0–28	
October 12		Albion	Kalamazoo, MI	L 0–26	
October 26		at Hope*	Holland, MI	W 60–5	
November 2	2:30 p.m.	Alma	Kalamazoo College campus; Kalamazoo, MI	L 0–54	
November 15	2:30 p.m.	Hillsdale	Kalamazoo College campus; Kalamazoo, MI	W 6–0	
*Non-conference game

== 1913 ==
1913 Kalamazoo Baptists football
- Conference: Michigan Intercollegiate Athletic Association
- Record: 2–4 (0–4 MIAA)
- Head coach: E. J. Mather (3rd season)
- Captain: Bill Buchanan

1913 Michigan Intercollegiate Athletic Association football standings
	Conf.					Overall
Team	W		L		T	W		L		T
Olivet $	3	–	1	–	0	4	–	3	–	0
Alma	2	–	1	–	0	3	–	4	–	0
Hillsdale	2	–	1	–	1	2	–	3	–	1
Albion	3	–	2	–	1	3	–	3	–	1
Adrian	1	–	2	–	0	2	–	4	–	0
Kalamazoo	0	–	4	–	0	2	–	4	–	0
$ – Conference champion

The 1913 Kalamazoo Baptists football team, also known as the Kalamazoo Orange and Black, represented Kalamazoo College in the Michigan Intercollegiate Athletic Association (MIAA) during the 1913 college football season. In their third year under head coach E. J. Mather, the Baptists compiled a 2–4 record (0–4 in conference games) and finished in sixth place in the MIAA. Bill Buchanan was the team captain.

=== Schedule ===
Date	Time	Opponent	Site	Result	Source
October 11		Battle Creek YMCA*	Kalamazoo, MI	W 26–0	
October 18		at Hope*	Holland, MI	W 27–0	
October 25		at Albion	Winter-Lau Field; Albion, MI	L 7–23	
November 1		Olivet	Kalamazoo, MI	L 0–26	
November 8	2:30 p.m.	Albion	Kalamazoo College campus; Kalamazoo, MI	L 0–13	
November 14		at Hillsdale	Hillsdale, MI	L 7–19	
*Non-conference game

== 1914 ==
1914 Kalamazoo Baptists football
- Conference: Michigan Intercollegiate Athletic Association
- Record: 4–1 (3–1 MIAA)
- Head coach: E. J. Mather (4th season)

1914 Michigan Intercollegiate Athletic Association football standings
	Conf.					Overall
Team	W		L		T	W		L		T
Olivet +	3	–	1	–	0	5	–	3	–	0
Hillsdale +	3	–	1	–	0	3	–	3	–	1
Kalamazoo	3	–	1	–	0	4	–	1	–	0
Albion	1	–	4	–	0	1	–	6	–	0
Adrian	0	–	1	–	0	3	–	3	–	0
Alma	0	–	2	–	0	2	–	5	–	1
+ – Conference co-champions

The 1914 Kalamazoo Baptists football team, also known as the Kalamazoo Orange and Black, represented Kalamazoo College in the Michigan Intercollegiate Athletic Association (MIAA) during the 1914 college football season. In their fourth year under head coach E. J. Mather, the Baptists compiled a 4–1 record (3–1 in conference games) and finished in third place in the MIAA.

=== Schedule ===
Date	Time	Opponent	Site	Result	Source
October 17		at Hillsdale	Hillsdale, MI	L 0–6	
October 24	2:30 p.m.	Albion	Kalamazoo College campus; Kalamazoo, MI	W 12–3	
October 30	3:30 p.m.	Ferris Institute*	Kalamazoo College campus; Kalamazoo, MI	W 41–13	
November 7		at Olivet	Olivet, MI	W 20–0	
November 13	3:00 p.m.	at Albion	Winterlau Field; Albion, MI	W 33–0	
*Non-conference game

== 1915 ==
1915 Kalamazoo Baptists football
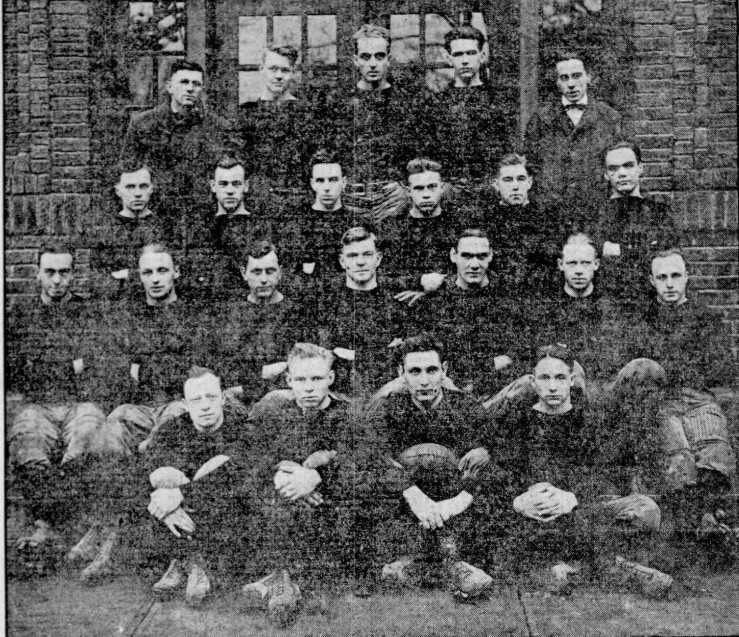
- Conference: Michigan Intercollegiate Athletic Association
- Record: 3–2 (2–2 MIAA)
- Head coach: E. J. Mather (5th season)
- Home stadium: College athletic field

1915 Michigan Intercollegiate Athletic Association football standings
	Conf.					Overall
Team	W		L		T	W		L		T
Albion $	4	–	0	–	1	5	–	1	–	1
Alma	1	–	0	–	2	1	–	3	–	2
Olivet	2	–	1	–	2	3	–	3	–	2
Kalamazoo	2	–	2	–	0	3	–	2	–	0
Hillsdale	2	–	3	–	1	3	–	3	–	1
Adrian	0	–	5	–	0	2	–	5	–	0
+ – Conference co-champions

The 1915 Kalamazoo Baptists football team, also known as the Kalamazoo Orange and Black, represented Kalamazoo College in the Michigan Intercollegiate Athletic Association (MIAA) during the 1915 college football season. In their fifth year under head coach E. J. Mather, the Baptists compiled a 3–2 record (2–2 in conference games) and finished in fourth place in the MIAA.

Five Kalamazoo players were selected as first-team players on the MIAA all-star team for 1915: MacGregor at quarterback; Preston at end; Hall at left guard; Conrad at center; and Taylor at tackle. Three others were named to the second team: Walker at halfback; Emerson at tackle; and Tedrow at end.

=== Schedule ===
Date	Time	Opponent	Site	Result	Source
October 8	3:30 p.m.	Ferris Institute*	College athletic field; Kalamazoo, MI	W 59–0	
October 16		at Adrian	Adrian, MI	W 27–7	
October 30		at Hillsdale	Martin Field; Hillsdale, MI	W 10–7	
November 5		Olivet	Kalamazoo, MI	L 6–6 (0–1 forfeit)	
November 12	2:30 p.m.	Albion	Western Normal athletic field; Kalamazoo, MI	L 0–14	
*Non-conference game

== 1916 ==
1916 Kalamazoo Baptists football
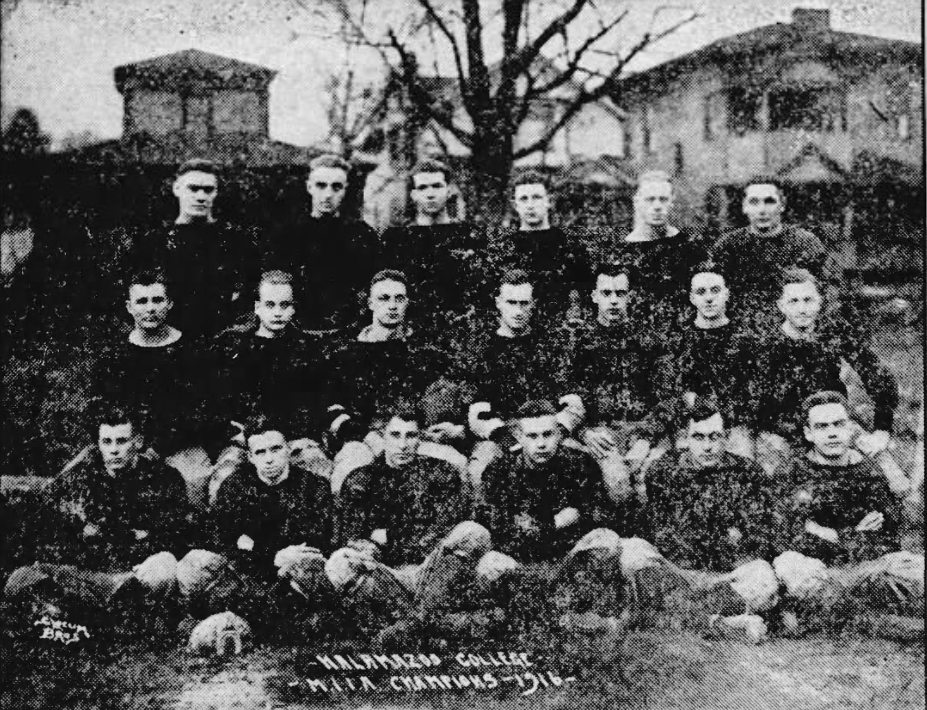

MIAA champion
- Conference: Michigan Intercollegiate Athletic Association
- Record: 7–0 (5–0 MIAA)
- Head coach: Ralph H. Young (1st season)

The 1916 Kalamazoo Baptists football team, also known as the Kalamazoo Orange and Black, represented Kalamazoo College in the Michigan Intercollegiate Athletic Association (MIAA) during the 1916 college football season. In their first year under head coach Ralph H. Young, the Baptists compiled a perfect 7–0 record (5–0 in conference games), won the MIAA championship, and outscored opponents by a total of 291 to 40.

=== Schedule ===
Date	Opponent	Site	Result	Attendance	Source
October 13	at Grand Rapids Veterinary*	Grand Rapids, MI	W 108–0		
October 21	at Michigan State Normal	Ypsilanti, MI	W 21–6		
October 28	Hillsdale	Kalamazoo, MI	W 39–7		
November 4	at Olivet	Olivet, MI	W 27–0		
November 11	at Albion	Alumni Field; Albion, MI	W 41–13	4,000	
November 18	at Alma	Davis Field; Alma, MI	W 21–7		
November 25	Notre Dame freshmen*	Kalamazoo, MI	W 34–7		
*Non-conference game

== 1917 ==
1917 Kalamazoo Baptists football
- Conference: Michigan Intercollegiate Athletic Association
- Record: 5–5 (4–1 MIAA)
- Head coach: Ralph H. Young (2nd season)

1917 Michigan Intercollegiate Athletic Association football standings
	Conf.					Overall
Team	W		L		T	W		L		T
Alma $	4	–	0	–	0	6	–	1	–	0
Kalamazoo	4	–	1	–	0	5	–	5	–	0
Albion	2	–	2	–	0	3	–	3	–	0
Olivet	2	–	3	–	0	3	–	3	–	0
Adrian	0	–	2	–	0	0	–	3	–	0
Hillsdale	0	–	4	–	0	0	–	5	–	0
$ – Conference champion

The 1917 Kalamazoo Baptists football team, also known as the Kalamazoo Orange and Black, represented Kalamazoo College in the Michigan Intercollegiate Athletic Association (MIAA) during the 1917 college football season. In their second and final year under head coach Ralph H. Young, the Baptists compiled a 5–5 record (4–1 in conference games), finished in second place in the MIAA.

=== Schedule ===
Date	Time	Opponent	Site	Result	Attendance	Source
September 29		Adrian	Kalamazoo, MI	W 76–0		
October 6	2:30 p.m.	at Notre Dame*	Cartier Field; South Bend, IN	L 0–55		
October 13		at Michigan Agricultural*	College Field; East Lansing, MI	W 7–3		
October 20		at Detroit*	Elmwood Avenue gridiron; Detroit, MI	L 0–26		
October 24	3:00 p.m.	at Camp Custer*	Field opposite General Dickman's home; Battle Creek, MI	L 7–34		
October 27		at Hillsdale	Hillsdale, MI	W 19–0		
November 3		at Michigan*	Ferry Field; Ann Arbor, MI	L 0–62	4,345	
November 9	2:30 p.m.	Albion	Kalamazoo, MI	W 28–10		
November 17	2:30 p.m.	Alma	Kalamazoo College campus; Kalamazoo, MI	L 14–25		
November 24	2:30 p.m.	Olivet	Kalamazoo College campus; Kalamazoo, MI	W 26–10		
*Non-conference game

== 1918 ==
1918 Kalamazoo Baptists football
- Conference: Independent
- Record: 1–2
- Head coach: Paul Staake (1st season)

The 1918 Kalamazoo Baptists football team, also known as the Kalamazoo Orange and Black, represented Kalamazoo College during the 1918 college football season. The Michigan Intercollegiate Athletic Association (MIAA) was inactive in 1918. In their first year under head coach Paul Staake, the Baptists compiled a 1–2 record.

=== Schedule ===
Date	Opponent	Site	Result	Source
October 26	Hillsdale	Kalamazoo, MI	W 6–0	
November 9	at Albion	Alumni Field; Albion, MI	L 10–34	
November 16	Hope	Kalamazoo College campus; Kalamazoo, MI	L 13–14	

== 1919 ==
1919 Kalamazoo Baptists football

MIAA champion
- Conference: Michigan Intercollegiate Athletic Association
- Record: 5–2 (4–0 MIAA)
- Head coach: Ralph H. Young (3rd season)

The 1919 Kalamazoo Baptists football team, also known as the Kalamazoo Orange and Black, represented Kalamazoo College in the Michigan Intercollegiate Athletic Association (MIAA) during the 1919 college football season. In their third year under head coach Ralph H. Young, the Baptists compiled a 5–2 record (4–0 in conference games) and won the MIAA championship.

=== Schedule ===
Date	Opponent	Site	Result	Attendance	Source
October 4	at Notre Dame*	Cartier Field; Notre Dame, IN	L 0–14	5,000	
October 11	Hope	Kalamazoo, MI	W 30–0		
October 17	Grand Rapids*	Kalamazoo, MI	W 62–0		
October 25	at Hillsdale	Hillsdale, MI	W 41–20		
November 1	at Detroit*	Navin Field; Detroit, MI	L 0–28		
November 8	Albion	Kalamazoo, MI	W 13–2		
November 15	at Alma	Alma, MI	W 41–6		
*Non-conference game
