= 1994 Albion Britons football team =

American college football season

1994 Albion Britons football

NCAA Division III champion

Stagg Bowl, W 38–15 vs. Washington & Jefferson
- Conference: Michigan Intercollegiate Athletic Association
- Record: 13–0 (5–0 MIAA)
- Head coach: Pete Schmidt (12th season)
- Defensive coordinator: Greg Pscodna (5th season)
- Home stadium: Sprankle-Sprandel Stadium

1994 Michigan Intercollegiate Athletic Association football standings
	Conf.					Overall
Team	W		L		T	W		L		T
Albion $^	5	–	0	–	0	13	–	0	–	0
Alma	4	–	1	–	0	8	–	1	–	0
Hope	2	–	3	–	0	4	–	4	–	1
Kalamazoo	2	–	3	–	0	4	–	5	–	0
Adrian	2	–	3	–	0	3	–	6	–	0
Olivet	0	–	5	–	0	1	–	8	–	0
$ – Conference champion; ^ – NCAA Division III playoff participant

The 1994 Albion Britons football team was an American football team that represented Albion College as a member of the Michigan Intercollegiate Athletic Association (MIAA) during the 1994 NCAA Division III football season. In their 12th season under head coach Pete Schmidt, the Britons compiled a perfect 13–0 record and won the MIAA championship. It was Albion's sixth consecutive MIAA championship.

The team participated in the NCAA Division III playoffs where they defeated Augustana (Illinois) in the first round, Mount Union in the North Region final, Saint John's (Minnesota) in the semifinal, and Washington & Jefferson in the national championship game.

The team was led on offense by tailback Jeff Robinson who gained 1,708 yards during the 1994 season, including 1,273 in the regular season.

The team played its home games at Sprankle-Sprandel Stadium in Albion, Michigan.

== Schedule ==
Date	Opponent	Site	Result	Attendance	Source
September 3	at Wilmington (OH)*	Wilmington, OH	W 44–20	1,120	
September 10	Aurora*	Sprankle-Sprandel Stadium; Albion, MI	W 27–0	2,569	
September 17	at Wabash*	Crawfordsville, IN	W 14–7	3,750	
September 24	DePauw*	Sprankle-Sprandel Stadium; Albion, MI	W 35–14	1,555	
October 8	Adrian	Sprankle-Sprandel Stadium; Albion, MI	W 60–18	3,883	
October 15	at Olivet	Griswold Field; Olivet, MI	W 65–8	2,479	
October 22	Hope	Sprankle-Sprandel Stadium; Albion, MI	W 35–12	4,844	
October 29	at Alma	Alma, MI	W 26–0	6,442	
November 5	at Kalamazoo	Kalamazoo, MI	W 34–7	1,500	
November 19	Augustana (IL)*	Sprankle-Sprandel Stadium; Albion, MI (NCAA Division III first round)	W 28–21	3,500	
November 26	Mount Union*	Sprankle-Sprandel Stadium; Albion, MI (NCAA Division III quarterfinal)	W 34–33	3,700	
December 3	at Saint John's (MN)*	Collegeville, MN (NCAA Division III semifinal)	W 19–16	5,053	
December 10	vs. Washington & Jefferson*	Salem, VA (NCAA Division III championship game—Stagg Bowl)	W 38–15	7,168	
*Non-conference game
