= Jamie Zorbo =

American football player and coach (born 1978)

Current position
- Title: Athletic director
- Team: Kalamazoo
- Conference: MIAA

Biographical details
- Born: February 20, 1978 (age 48)
- Education: Kalamazoo College (2000); Western Michigan University (2004)

Playing career
- 1996–1999: Kalamazoo
- Position: Defensive end

Coaching career (HC unless noted)
- 2000–2003: Kalamazoo (DL)
- 2005–2005: Kalamazoo (DC/DB/RC)
- 2006–2007: DePauw (assistant)
- 2008–2025: Kalamazoo

Administrative career (AD unless noted)
- 2024–present: Kalamazoo

Head coaching record
- Overall: 59–113

Accomplishments and honors

Awards
- MIAA Coach of the Year (2025)

Jamie Zorbo (born February 20, 1978) is an American athletics administrator and former college football coach. He is the athletic director a Kalamazoo College. Zorbo served as the head football coach at Kalamazoo from 2008 to 2025, compiling a record of 59–113 in 18 seasons.

== Playing career ==
Zorbo played defensive end for the Kalamazoo College Hornets located in Kalamazoo, Michigan.

== Coaching career ==
Kalamazoo hired Zorbo as its head football coach in 2008, succeeding Terrance Brooks. Zorbo became athletic director as well in 2024.

== Head coaching record ==
Year	Team	Overall	Conference	Standing	Bowl/playoffs
Kalamazoo Hornets (Michigan Intercollegiate Athletic Association) (2008–2025)
2008	Kalamazoo	2–8	1–5	6th	
2009	Kalamazoo	4–6	1–5	6th	
2010	Kalamazoo	3–7	2–4	T–5th	
2011	Kalamazoo	4–6	1–5	T–5th	
2012	Kalamazoo	5–5	2–4	5th	
2013	Kalamazoo	6–4	4–2	T–2nd	
2014	Kalamazoo	2–8	2–4	6th	
2015	Kalamazoo	3–7	1–5	6th	
2016	Kalamazoo	3–7	1–5	6th	
2017	Kalamazoo	1–9	0–6	7th	
2018	Kalamazoo	7–3	4–3	T–3rd	
2019	Kalamazoo	2–8	1–6	7th	
2020–21	Kalamazoo	0–2	0–2	6th	
2021	Kalamazoo	1–9	0–6	7th	
2022	Kalamazoo	3–7	0–6	7th	
2023	Kalamazoo	5–5	1–5	6th	
2024	Kalamazoo	4–6	1–6	7th	
2025	Kalamazoo	4–6	1–6	T–6th	
Kalamazoo:		59–113	23–85		
Total:		59–113			
