= Pete Schmidt (American football) =

American football player and coach (1948–2000)

Biographical details
- Born: April 24, 1948; Port Austin, Michigan, U.S.
- Died: September 29, 2000 (aged 52); Bloomington, Indiana, U.S.

Playing career
- 1967–1970: Alma

Coaching career (HC unless noted)

Football
- 1971: Stockbridge HS (MI)
- 1972–1973: Okemos HS (MI) (DC)
- 1974–1981: Okemos HS (MI)
- 1982: Albion (DC)
- 1983–1996: Albion
- 1997–1999: Indiana (OC)

Baseball
- 1973: Okemos HS (MI)

Head coaching record
- Overall: 105–27–4 (college football); 64–20 (high school football)
- Tournaments: 5–4 (NCAA D-III playoff)

Accomplishments and honors

Championships
- 1 NCAA Division III (1994); 9 MIAA (1985, 1989–1996)

Peter J. Schmidt (April 24, 1948 – September 29, 2000) was an American football coach. He was the head football coach at Albion College from 1983 to 1996 and led the school to nine Michigan Intercollegiate Athletic Association (MIAA) championships and the NCAA Division III Football Championship in 1994. He has also served as the offensive coordinator at Indiana University from 1997 to 1999. Schmidt died in September 2000 at age 52 after a year-long battle with cancer. Schmidt's overall record in 14 years as a college football head coach is 104–27–4. Since 2001, the Pete Schmidt Memorial Scholar-Athlete Award has been presented each year by the MIAA football coaches to an outstanding scholar-athlete at an MIAA school.

Schmidt served as the head football coach for Stockbridge High School and Okemos High School an amassed an overall record of 64–20.

== Head coaching record ==
=== College football ===
Year	Team	Overall	Conference	Standing	Bowl/playoffs
Albion Britons (Michigan Intercollegiate Athletic Association) (1983–1996)
1983	Albion	5–4	2–3	T–4th	
1984	Albion	5–4	3–2	3rd	
1985	Albion	7–2–1	4–0–1	T–1st	L NCAA Division III First Round
1986	Albion	6–2–1	3–1–1	3rd	
1987	Albion	5–4	3–2	3rd	
1988	Albion	6–3	3–2	3rd	
1989	Albion	7–2	4–1	T–1st	
1990	Albion	7–1–1	4–0–1	1st	
1991	Albion	8–1–1	4–0–1	T–1st	L NCAA Division III First Round
1992	Albion	8–1	5–0	1st	
1993	Albion	10–1	5–0	1st	L NCAA Division III Quarterfinal
1994	Albion	13–0	5–0	1st	W NCAA Division III Championship
1995	Albion	8–1	5–0	1st	
1996	Albion	9–1	5–0	1st	L NCAA Division III First Round
Albion:		104–27–4	55–11–4		
Total:		104–27–4			
National championship Conference title Conference division title or championship game berth

=== High school football ===
Year	Team	Overall	Conference	Standing	Bowl/playoffs
Stockbridge Panthers () (1971)
1971	Stockbridge	3–5	3–4		
Stockbridge:		3–5	3–4		
Okemos Wolves () (1974–1981)
1974	Okemos	7–4	2–4		
1975	Okemos	6–2	5–0	1st	
1976	Okemos	9–1	7–0	1st	
1977	Okemos	7–1	6–1		
1978	Okemos	5–4	4–3		
1979	Okemos	9–0	6–0	1st	
1980	Okemos	11–1	5–0	1st	
1981	Okemos	7–2	5–0	1st	
Okemos:		61–15	40–8		
Total:		64–20			
National championship Conference title Conference division title or championship game berth
