= Kalamazoo Hornets football =

College football team

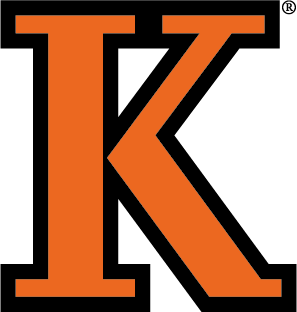
- First season: 1892; 134 years ago
- Athletic director: Becky Hall
- Head coach: John Krajacic; 1st season, 0–0 (–)
- Location: Kalamazoo, Michigan
- Stadium: Angell Field (capacity: 2,458)
- NCAA division: Division III
- Conference: MIAA
- Colors: Orange and black
- All-time record: 439–573–43 (.436)

Conference championships
- 14 MIAA (1897–1899, 1916, 1919, 1921, 1930, 1934, 1936–1937, 1946–1947, 1962–1963)
- Mascot: Hornets
- Website: hornets.kzoo.edu/football

The Kalamazoo Hornets football team represents Kalamazoo College in college football at the NCAA Division III level. The Hornets are members of the Michigan Intercollegiate Athletic Association (MIAA), fielding its team in the MIAA since 1892. The Hornets play their home games at Angell Field in Kalamazoo, Michigan.

The team's head coach is Jamie Zorbo, who took over the position for the 2008 season.

== Conference affiliation ==
- Independent (1892–1895)
- Michigan Intercollegiate Athletic Association (1896–present)

== Year-by-year results ==
National champions	Conference champions	Bowl game berth	Playoff berth

Season	Year	Head coach	Association	Division	Conference	Record							Postseason	Final ranking
Season	Year	Head coach	Association	Division	Conference	Overall			Conference				Postseason	Final ranking
Season	Year	Head coach	Association	Division	Conference	Win	Loss	Tie	Finish	Win	Loss	Tie	Postseason	Final ranking
Kalamazoo Hornets
1892	1892	No coach	—	—	Independent	0	2	0					—	—
1893	1893	No coach	—	—	Independent	0	2	0					—	—
1894	1894	No coach	—	—	Independent	2	1	0					—	—
1895	1895	No coach	—	—	Independent	1	1	0					—	—
1896	1896	No coach	—	—	MIAA	3	1	1	3rd	2	1	0	—	—
1897	1897	Charles Hall	—	—	MIAA	6	1	0	1st	6	0	0	Conference champions	—
1898	1898	Charles Hall	—	—	MIAA	7	0	0	1st	5	0	0	Conference champions	—
1899	1899	Charles Hall	—	—	MIAA	6	1	2	1st	5	0	0	Conference champions	—
1900	1900	Charles Hall	—	—	MIAA	2	2	1	2nd	1	1	0	—	—
1901	1901	Maurice Waterbury	—	—	MIAA	2	5	1	4th	2	5	0	—	—
1902	1902	LeRoy Hornbeck	—	—	MIAA	3	5	1	T–5th	0	5	0	—	—
1903	1903	Joseph Rowe	—	—	MIAA	6	2	0	3rd	5	2	0	—	—
1904	1904	Wesley Clapp	—	—	MIAA	1	6	0	5th	1	5	0	—	—
1905	1905	Rufus Gilbert	—	—	MIAA	3	6	0	T–3rd	3	3	0	—	—
1906	1906	Maurice Post	IAAUS	—	MIAA	1	3	1	5th	0	3	1	—	—
1907	1907	Rufus Gilbert	IAAUS	—	MIAA	0	6	0	5th	0	5	0	—	—
1908	1908	Rufus Gilbert	IAAUS	—	MIAA	2	7	1	5th	0	4	1	—	—
1909	1909	Van Ward	IAAUS	—	MIAA	2	3	1	3rd	2	2	1	—	—
1910	1910	Ivan Doseff	NCAA	—	MIAA	1	4	1	4th	0	3	1	—	—
1911	1911	E. J. Mather	NCAA	—	MIAA	2	2	0	4th	0	2	0	—	—
1912	1912	E. J. Mather	NCAA	—	MIAA	2	3	0	T–4th	1	3	0	—	—
1913	1913	E. J. Mather	NCAA	—	MIAA	2	4	0	6th	0	4	0	—	—
1914	1914	E. J. Mather	NCAA	—	MIAA	4	1	0	3rd	3	1	0	—	—
1915	1915	E. J. Mather	NCAA	—	MIAA	3	2	0	4th	2	2	0	—	—
1916	1916	Ralph H. Young	NCAA	—	MIAA	7	0	0	1st	5	0	0	Conference champions	—
1917	1917	Ralph H. Young	NCAA	—	MIAA	5	5	0	2nd	4	1	0	—	—
1918	1918	Paul Staake	NCAA	—	MIAA	1	2	0	N/A	1	1	0	—	—
1919	1919	Ralph H. Young	NCAA	—	MIAA	5	2	0	1st	4	0	0	Conference champions	—
1920	1920	Ralph H. Young	NCAA	—	MIAA	5	3	1	2nd	3	1	0	—	—
1921	1921	Ralph H. Young	NCAA	—	MIAA	7	2	0	1st	3	0	0	Conference champions	—
1922	1922	Ralph H. Young	NCAA	—	MIAA	4	4	1	3rd	1	1	1	—	—
1923	1923	Maynard Street	NCAA	—	MIAA	0	10	0	6th	0	5	0	—	—
1924	1924	Maynard Street	NCAA	—	MIAA	2	6	0	6th	0	5	0	—	—
1925	1925	Chester S. Barnard	NCAA	—	MIAA	5	2	1	3rd	2	2	1	—	—
1926	1926	Chester S. Barnard	NCAA	—	MIAA	3	4	1	T–2nd	2	3	0	—	—
1927	1927	Chester S. Barnard	NCAA	—	MIAA	3	5	0	T–3rd	2	3	0	—	—
1928	1928	Chester S. Barnard	NCAA	—	MIAA	3	3	2	2nd	3	1	1	—	—
1929	1929	Chester S. Barnard	NCAA	—	MIAA	1	4	3	6th	0	3	2	—	—
1930	1930	Chester S. Barnard	NCAA	—	MIAA	5	3	0	T–1st	4	1	0	Conference co-champions	—
1931	1931	Chester S. Barnard	NCAA	—	MIAA	5	4	0	4th	2	3	0	—	—
1932	1932	Chester S. Barnard	NCAA	—	MIAA	4	3	1	4th	1	2	1	—	—
1933	1933	Chester S. Barnard	NCAA	—	MIAA	3	2	2	T–2nd	1	1	2	—	—
1934	1934	Chester S. Barnard	NCAA	—	MIAA	3	3	1	T–1st	2	1	1	Conference co-champions	—
1935	1935	Chester S. Barnard	NCAA	—	MIAA	2	3	2	2nd	2	1	1	—	—
1936	1936	Chester S. Barnard	NCAA	—	MIAA	7	0	1	1st	7	0	1	Conference champions	—
1937	1937	Chester S. Barnard	NCAA	—	MIAA	7	1	0	1st	4	0	0	Conference champions	—
1938	1938	Chester S. Barnard	NCAA	—	MIAA	3	4	1	T–3rd	1	2	1	—	—
1939	1939	Chester S. Barnard	NCAA	—	MIAA	3	5	0	4th	3	3	0	—	—
1940	1940	Chester S. Barnard	NCAA	—	MIAA	1	6	1	6th	0	5	0	—	—
1941	1941	Chester S. Barnard	NCAA	—	MIAA	5	2	1	4th	2	2	1	—	—
1942	1942	Bob Nulf	NCAA	—	MIAA	4	3	0	T–2nd	2	2	0	—	—
No team from 1943 to 1945
1946	1946	Bob Nulf	NCAA	—	MIAA	6	2	0	T–1st	4	1	0	Conference co-champions	—
1947	1947	Bob Nulf	NCAA	—	MIAA	4	1	3	T–1st	3	0	2	Conference co-champions	—
1948	1948	Bob Nulf	NCAA	—	MIAA	4	4	1	2nd	3	1	1	—	—
1949	1949	Lloyd Grow	NCAA	—	MIAA	2	6	0	5th	1	4	0	—	—
1950	1950	Lloyd Grow	NCAA	—	MIAA	5	4	0	2nd	4	1	0	—	—
1951	1951	Lloyd Grow	NCAA	—	MIAA	2	6	0	T–4th	2	3	0	—	—
1952	1952	Lloyd Grow	NCAA	—	MIAA	3	4	1	T–3rd	2	3	0	—	—
1953	1953	Rolla Anderson	NCAA	—	MIAA	1	7	0	7th	0	6	0	—	—
1954	1954	Rolla Anderson	NCAA	—	MIAA	6	2	0	T–2nd	4	2	0	—	—
1955	1955	Rolla Anderson	NCAA	—	MIAA	5	3	0	2nd	4	2	0	—	—
1956	1956	Rolla Anderson	NCAA	College Division	MIAA	5	3	0	2nd	5	1	0	—	—
1957	1957	Rolla Anderson	NCAA	College Division	MIAA	2	5	1	5th	2	3	1	—	—
1958	1958	Rolla Anderson	NCAA	College Division	MIAA	0	8	0	7th	0	6	0	—	—
1959	1959	Rolla Anderson	NCAA	College Division	MIAA	2	6	0	T–5th	1	5	0	—	—
1960	1960	Rolla Anderson	NCAA	College Division	MIAA	4	5	0	4th	2	3	0	—	—
1961	1961	Rolla Anderson	NCAA	College Division	MIAA	4	4	0	3rd	3	2	0	—	—
1962	1962	Rolla Anderson	NCAA	College Division	MIAA	8	0	0	1st	5	0	0	Conference champions	—
1963	1963	Rolla Anderson	NCAA	College Division	MIAA	6	2	0	T–1st	4	1	0	Conference co-champions	—
1964	1964	Rolla Anderson	NCAA	College Division	MIAA	5	3	0	3rd	3	2	0	—	—
1965	1965	Rolla Anderson	NCAA	College Division	MIAA	5	3	0	T–2nd	3	2	0	—	—
1966	1966	Rolla Anderson	NCAA	College Division	MIAA	3	5	0	T–4th	2	3	0	—	—
1967	1967	Ed Baker	NCAA	College Division	MIAA	2	6	0	T–5th	1	4	0	—	—
1968	1968	Ed Baker	NCAA	College Division	MIAA	4	6	0	T–5th	1	4	0	—	—
1969	1969	Ed Baker	NCAA	College Division	MIAA	4	4	0	3rd	3	2	0	—	—
1970	1970	Ed Baker	NCAA	College Division	MIAA	3	5	0	5th	1	4	0	—	—
1971	1971	Ed Baker	NCAA	College Division	MIAA	5	3	0	4th	2	3	0	—	—
1972	1972	Ed Baker	NCAA	College Division	MIAA	2	5	1	5th	1	3	1	—	—
1973	1973	Ed Baker	NCAA	Division III	MIAA	4	4	0	T–4th	2	3	0	—	—
1974	1974	Ed Baker	NCAA	Division III	MIAA	2	6	0	5th	1	4	0	—	—
1975	1975	Ed Baker	NCAA	Division III	MIAA	4	4	0	6th	1	4	0	—	—
1976	1976	Ed Baker	NCAA	Division III	MIAA	3	4	1	4th	2	3	0	—	—
1977	1977	Ed Baker	NCAA	Division III	MIAA	3	5	0	5th	1	4	0	—	—
1978	1978	Ed Baker	NCAA	Division III	MIAA	6	2	0	3rd	3	2	0	—	—
1979	1979	Ed Baker	NCAA	Division III	MIAA	5	3	0	4th	2	3	0	—	—
1980	1980	Ed Baker	NCAA	Division III	MIAA	3	5	0	T–5th	1	4	0	—	—
1981	1981	Ed Baker	NCAA	Division III	MIAA	3	6	0	4th	2	3	0	—	—
1982	1982	Ed Baker	NCAA	Division III	MIAA	5	2	1	T–3rd	2	2	1	—	—
1983	1983	Ed Baker	NCAA	Division III	MIAA	5	4	0	T–4th	2	3	0	—	—
1984	1984	Bob Kent	NCAA	Division III	MIAA	1	8	0	6th	0	5	0	—	—
1985	1985	Jim Heath	NCAA	Division III	MIAA	1	8	0	5th	1	4	0	—	—
1986	1986	Jim Heath	NCAA	Division III	MIAA	1	8	0	5th	1	4	0	—	—
1987	1987	Jim Heath	NCAA	Division III	MIAA	1	8	0	6th	0	5	0	—	—
1988	1988	Ed Baker	NCAA	Division III	MIAA	0	8	1	6th	0	4	1	—	—
1989	1989	Ed Baker	NCAA	Division III	MIAA	1	7	1	T–5th	1	4	0	—	—
1990	1990	Dave Warmack	NCAA	Division III	MIAA	3	5	1	5th	1	3	1	—	—
1991	1991	Dave Warmack	NCAA	Division III	MIAA	5	4	0	T–3rd	2	3	0	—	—
1992	1992	Dave Warmack	NCAA	Division III	MIAA	3	6	0	T–5th	1	4	0	—	—
1993	1993	Dave Warmack	NCAA	Division III	MIAA	7	2	0	2nd	4	1	0	—	—
1994	1994	Dave Warmack	NCAA	Division III	MIAA	4	5	0	T–3rd	2	3	0	—	—
1995	1995	Dave Warmack	NCAA	Division III	MIAA	4	5	0	T–2nd	3	2	0	—	—
1996	1996	Dave Warmack	NCAA	Division III	MIAA	3	6	0	T–3rd	2	3	0	—	—
1997	1997	Dave Warmack	NCAA	Division III	MIAA	4	5	0	5th	1	4	0	—	—
1998	1998	Tim Rogers	NCAA	Division III	MIAA	4	5	0	T–5th	2	4	0	—	—
1999	1999	Tim Rogers	NCAA	Division III	MIAA	3	6	0	5th	2	4	0	—	—
2000	2000	Tim Rogers	NCAA	Division III	MIAA	5	4	0	T–2nd	3	2	0	—	—
2001	2001	Tim Rogers	NCAA	Division III	MIAA	5	4	0	5th	1	4	0	—	—
2002	2002	Tim Rogers	NCAA	Division III	MIAA	5	5	0	6th	2	4	0	—	—
2003	2003	Tim Rogers	NCAA	Division III	MIAA	6	4	0	6th	2	4	0	—	—
2004	2004	Van Nickert	NCAA	Division III	MIAA	1	9	0	8th	0	7	0	—	—
2005	2005	Terrance Brooks	NCAA	Division III	MIAA	4	6	0	6th	3	4	0	—	—
2006	2006	Terrance Brooks	NCAA	Division III	MIAA	2	7	0	T–6th	2	5	0	—	—
2007	2007	Terrance Brooks	NCAA	Division III	MIAA	1	8	0	8th	0	7	0	—	—
2008	2008	Jamie Zorbo	NCAA	Division III	MIAA	2	8	0	6th	1	5	0	—	—
2009	2009	Jamie Zorbo	NCAA	Division III	MIAA	4	6	0	6th	1	5	0	—	—
2010	2010	Jamie Zorbo	NCAA	Division III	MIAA	3	7	0	T–5th	2	4	0	—	—
2011	2011	Jamie Zorbo	NCAA	Division III	MIAA	4	6	0	T–5th	1	5	0	—	—
2012	2012	Jamie Zorbo	NCAA	Division III	MIAA	5	5	0	5th	2	4	0	—	—
2013	2013	Jamie Zorbo	NCAA	Division III	MIAA	6	4	0	T–2nd	4	2	0	—	—
2014	2014	Jamie Zorbo	NCAA	Division III	MIAA	2	8	0	6th	2	4	0	—	—
2015	2015	Jamie Zorbo	NCAA	Division III	MIAA	3	7	0	6th	1	5	0	—	—
2016	2016	Jamie Zorbo	NCAA	Division III	MIAA	3	7	0	6th	1	5	0	—	—
2017	2017	Jamie Zorbo	NCAA	Division III	MIAA	1	9	0	7th	0	6	0	—	—
2018	2018	Jamie Zorbo	NCAA	Division III	MIAA	7	3	0	T–3rd	4	3	0	—	—
2019	2019	Jamie Zorbo	NCAA	Division III	MIAA	2	8	0	7th	1	6	0	—	—
2020–21	2020	Jamie Zorbo	NCAA	Division III	MIAA	0	2	0	6th	0	2	0	—	—
2021	2021	Jamie Zorbo	NCAA	Division III	MIAA	1	9	0	7th	0	6	0	—	—
2022	2022	Jamie Zorbo	NCAA	Division III	MIAA	3	7	0	7th	0	6	0	—	—
2023	2023	Jamie Zorbo	NCAA	Division III	MIAA	5	5	0	6th	1	5	0	—	—
2024	2024	Jamie Zorbo	NCAA	Division III	MIAA	4	6	0	7th	1	6	0	—	—
2025	2025	Jamie Zorbo	NCAA	Division III	MIAA	4	6	0	6th	1	6	0	—	—
