= Ivan Doseff =

American sportsperson (1884–1973)

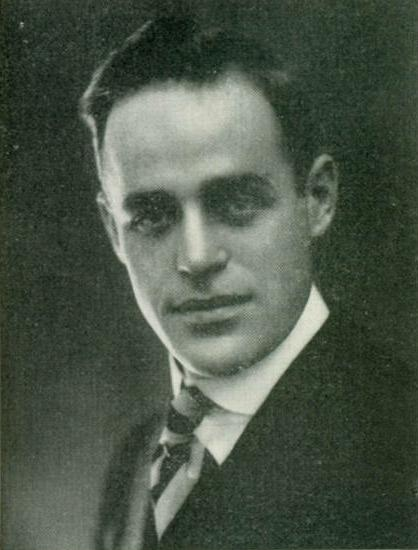

Biographical details
- Born: September 26, 1884; Bulgaria
- Died: May 3, 1973 (aged 88); Ramsey, Minnesota, U.S.

Playing career

Football
- 1907: Chicago
- Position: Tackle

Coaching career (HC unless noted)

Football
- 1908: Chicago (freshmen)
- 1909: LaCrosse HS (WI)
- 1910: Kalamazoo
- 1915: Fargo
- 1916: Elgin HS (IL)
- 1918: Cornell (IA) (acting HC)
- 1919–1920: Iowa State Normal
- 1921–1922: Luther (IA)

Basketball
- 1916–1917: Elgin HS (IL)
- 1919–1921: Iowa State Normal
- 1921–1923: Luther (IA)

Administrative career (AD unless noted)
- 1919–1921: Iowa State Normal

Head coaching record
- Overall: 13–20–4 (college football)

Ivan Doseff (September 26, 1884 – May 3, 1973) was a Bulgarian-American football player and coach of football, basketball, and track, and college athletics administrator. He served as the head football coach at Kalamazoo College in 1910, Fargo College in 1915, at Iowa State Teachers College—now known as the University of Northern Iowa—from 1919 to 1920, and at Luther College in Decorah, Iowa from 1921 to 1922, compiling a career college football record of 12–18–3.

== Coaching career ==
Doseff was the head football coach at Kalamazoo College in Kalamazoo, Michigan for one season, in 1910, compiling a record of 1–5–1.

== Death ==
Doseff died on May 3, 1973.

== Head coaching record ==
=== College football ===
Year	Team	Overall	Conference	Standing	Bowl/playoffs
Kalamazoo Baptists (Michigan Intercollegiate Athletic Association) (1910)
1910	Kalamazoo	1–4–1	0–3–1	4th	
Kalamazoo:		1–4–1	0–3–1		
Fargo Hilltoppers (Independent) (1915)
1915	Fargo	1–2–1			
Fargo:		1–2–1			
Iowa State Teachers (Independent) (1919–1920)
1919	Iowa State Teachers	2–4–1			
1920	Iowa State Teachers	4–2–1			
Iowa State Teachers:		6–6–2			
Luther Norse (Independent) (1921–1922)
1921	Luther	2–4			
1922	Luther	3–4			
Luther:		5–8			
Total:		13–20–4			
