= E. J. Mather =

American athlete and coach (1887–1928)

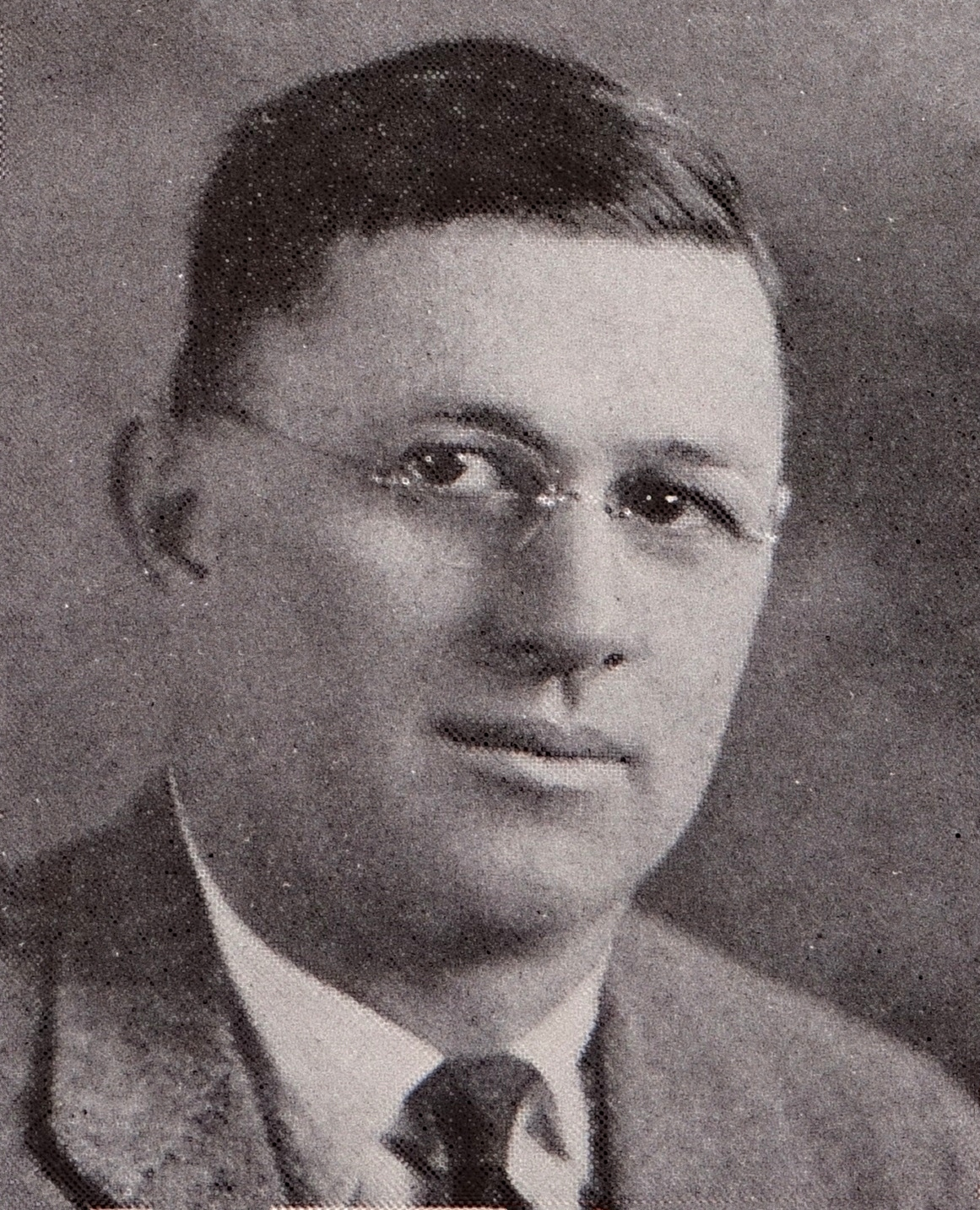

Biographical details
- Born: June 4, 1887; Ottumwa, Iowa, U.S.
- Died: August 26, 1928 (aged 41); Ann Arbor, Michigan, U.S.

Playing career

Football
- ?–1909: Lake Forest

Basketball
- ?–1910: Lake Forest
- Position: End (football)

Coaching career (HC unless noted)

Football
- 1911–1915: Kalamazoo
- 1916–1918: Lake Forest
- 1919–1927: Michigan (assistant)

Basketball
- 1911–1916: Kalamazoo
- 1919–1928: Michigan

Baseball
- 1912–1916: Kalamazoo

Head coaching record
- Overall: 16–25 (football); 137–66 (basketball)

Accomplishments and honors

Championships
- Basketball; 3 MIAA regular season (1914–1916); 3 Big Ten regular season (1921, 1926, 1927)

Edwin James "Murf" Mather (June 4, 1887 – August 26, 1928) was an American college football and college basketball player and coach. He was selected as an All-Western football player while playing for Lake Forest University in 1909 and went on to a coaching career at Kalamazoo College (1911–1916), Lake Forest (1916–1918), and the University of Michigan (1919–1928).

== Early life and playing career ==
Mather was born in Ottumwa, Iowa and played three sports at Ottumwa High School. He enrolled at Lake Forest University, where he played at the end position on the school's football team. In 1909, he was captain of the Lake Forest football team and was selected as an all-Western end by the Chicago Daily News. In selecting him for its All-Illinois football team that same year, the Chicago Record-Herald wrote: "Mather, by virtue of his glittering achievements in 1908, had little trouble in clinching a place on the all-state combine. With another season in which to perfect the forward pass and the open style of play Mather developed into a terror on offense. As a defensive player he is rated among the headliners throughout Illinois. His forte is left end. The game with DePauw Thanksgiving day marked the windup of Mather's college career." He was also captain of the Lake Forest basketball team in his senior year.

== Coaching career ==
=== Kalamazoo ===
In 1911, Mather was hired as the coach of all sports at Kalamazoo College, where he remained until 1916. He was the head football coach for five seasons, from 1911 until 1915, compiling a record of 13–12. Mather's basketball teams at Kalamazoo won all of their home games four times and went undefeated in the 1914–15 season. The teams also won the Michigan Intercollegiate Athletic Association titles in four of Mather's five years as the coach. Mather's Kalamazoo College basketball teams had a combined record of 29–13.

=== Arkansas ===
With the entry of the United States into World War I, Mather entered the United States Army. In March 1919, after being discharged from the Army, Mather took over as director and coach of athletics at the University of Arkansas. In April 1919, Mather was reported to be organizing teams in basketball, tennis, volleyball, and track at the Fayetteville, Arkansas campus.

=== Michigan ===
In the fall of 1919, Mather was hired by the University of Michigan. He was the head basketball coach at Michigan from 1919 to 1928 and coached the team to three Big Ten Conference titles and an overall record of 108–53 in his nine seasons as coach. He led the team to an 18–4 overall record (8–4 in conference) during the 1920–21 season. The 1921 team won its first eight and last eight games to tie the Wisconsin Badgers and Purdue Boilermakers for the Big Ten title. The team won back-to-back championships in 1925–26 and 1926–27. The 1926 squad, which was captained by Richard Doyle who became the team's first All-American, tied with Purdue, the Iowa Hawkeyes and Indiana Hoosiers for the conference championship. The 1927 team had a new All-American, Bennie Oosterbaan, and won the school's first back-to-back championships and first outright championship with a 14–3 overall (10–2, Big Ten) record.

Mather was also an assistant football coach at Michigan for nine seasons, from 1919 to 1927.

== Sickness and death ==
A few weeks after the Wolverines won the Big Ten championship for the 1926–27 season, Mather underwent surgery for cancer. Mather never fully recovered from the operation. In the fall of 1927, he was put in charge of Michigan's freshman football team, and he returned as basketball coach at the beginning of the 1927–28 season. However, Mather was forced to step down from his coaching duties on advice from his doctor. While he visited the team for practices, the 1927–28 basketball team was coached by Michigan's athletic director, Fielding H. Yost. A telephone line was installed at Mather's bedside, and football coach Harry Kipke relayed the plays to him and gave him a summary at the end of each game.

Mather died of cancer after a long illness in August 1928. He was age 41 at the time of his death and was survived by his wife and two small sons.

== Head coaching record ==
=== Football ===
Year	Team	Overall	Conference	Standing	Bowl/playoffs
Kalamazoo Baptists (Michigan Intercollegiate Athletic Association) (1911–1915)
1911	Kalamazoo	2–2	0–2	4th	
1912	Kalamazoo	2–3	1–3	T–4th	
1913	Kalamazoo	2–4	0–4	6th	
1914	Kalamazoo	4–1	3–1	3rd	
1915	Kalamazoo	3–2	2–2	4th	
Kalamazoo:		13–12	6–12		
Lake Forest Foresters (Independent) (1916–1918)
1916	Lake Forest	1–7			
1917	Lake Forest	2–5			
1918	Lake Forest	0–1			
Lake Forest:		3–13			
Total:		16–25			

=== Basketball ===
Record table
Season	Team	Overall	Conference	Standing	Postseason
Kalamazoo Hornets (Michigan Intercollegiate Athletic Association) (1911–1916)
1911–12	Kalamazoo	7–3	0–1	4th	
1912–13	Kalamazoo	1–4	0–2	4th	
1913–14	Kalamazoo	8–3	3–1	1st	
1914–15	Kalamazoo	7–0	6–0	1st	
1915–16	Kalamazoo	6–3	3–0	1st	
Kalamazoo:		29–13	12–4		
Michigan Wolverines (Big Ten Conference) (1919–1927)
1919–20	Michigan	10–13	3–9	T–7th	
1920–21	Michigan	18–4	8–4	T–1st	
1921–22	Michigan	15–4	8–4	T–2nd	
1922–23	Michigan	11–4	8–4	3rd	
1923–24	Michigan	10–7	6–6	7th	
1924–25	Michigan	8–6	6–5	5th	
1925–26	Michigan	12–5	8–4	T–1st	
1926–27	Michigan	14–3	10–2	1st	
1927–28	Michigan	10–7	7–5	5th	
Michigan:		108–53	24–10		
Total:		137–66			
National champion Postseason invitational champion Conference regular season champion Conference regular season and conference tournament champion Division regular season champion Division regular season and conference tournament champion Conference tournament champion
