= Van Ward =

American football coach

Van I. Ward
Biographical details
- Born: September 6, 1884; New York, U.S.
- Died: October 9, 1918 (aged 34); Wahpeton, North Dakota, U.S.

Playing career

Baseball
- 1908: Oberlin

Coaching career (HC unless noted)

Football
- 1908: Puget Sound
- 1909: Kalamazoo
- 1912–1917: Wahpeton

Basketball
- 1908–1909: Puget Sound

Baseball
- 1909: Puget Sound

Administrative career (AD unless noted)
- 1908–1909: Puget Sound
- 1909–1910: Kalamazoo
- 1912–1918: Wahpeton

Van Ira Ward (September 6, 1884 – October 9, 1918) was an American football, basketball, and baseball coach, athletics administrator, and educator. He served as the head football coach at the University of Puget Sound in 1908, Kalamazoo College in 1909, and the North Dakota State School of Science—now known as North Dakota State College of Science—from 1912 to 1917.

A native of Phoenix, New York, Ward attended Oberlin College, where he was elected captain of the 1908 baseball team. In 1908–09, he was the athletic director at Puget Sound, and coached football, basketball, and baseball. He left Puget Sound after a year to be the athletic director at Kalamazoo in 1909. Ward also taught French and Latin at Kalamazoo before resigning 1910. He coached at Saint Paul Central High School in Saint Paul, Minnesota in 1911–12 before going to the North Dakota State School of Science in 1912.

Ward died from Spanish flu, on October 9, 1918, in Wahpeton, North Dakota.

== Head coaching record ==
=== College football ===
Year	Team	Overall	Conference	Standing	Bowl/playoffs
Puget Sound Loggers (Independent) (1908)
1908	Puget Sound	0–4			
Puget Sound:		0–4			
Kalamazoo (Michigan Intercollegiate Athletic Association) (1909)
1909	Kalamazoo	2–3–1	2–2–1	3rd	
Kalamazoo:		2–3–1	2–2–1		
Total:					
