= Carey Bender =

American football player (born 1972)

Profile
- Position: Running back

Personal information
- Born: January 28, 1972 (age 54); Marion, Iowa, U.S.
- Listed height: 5 ft 8 in (1.73 m)
- Listed weight: 185 lb (84 kg)

Career information
- College: Coe College

Career history
- 1995–1996: Buffalo Bills
- 1998: Scottish Claymores
- Stats at Pro Football Reference

Carey Wayne Bender (born January 28, 1972) is an American former professional football running back in the National Football League (NFL) and in Europe. He attended Coe College, where he still holds numerous rushing records. He was given an opportunity to play in the NFL by Buffalo Bills head coach Marv Levy, a fellow Coe College graduate. He played with the Buffalo Bills in 1996 as a member of the team's practice squad. After playing well in the NFL pre-season, he appeared in one game of the regular season, but recorded no carries. He then played for the Scottish Claymores in Europe in 1998.
