= LeRoy Hornbeck =

American football coach, lawyer, real estate developer (1875–1964)

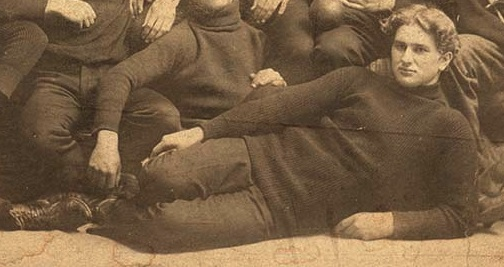

Biographical details
- Born: September 30, 1875; Lenawee County, Michigan, U.S.
- Died: October 16, 1964 (aged 89); Kalamazoo, Michigan, U.S.
- Education: University of Chicago; Kalamazoo College; University of Michigan

Playing career
- 1895–1899: Kalamazoo
- Position: Halfback

Coaching career (HC unless noted)
- 1902: Kalamazoo

Head coaching record
- Overall: 3–5–1

LeRoy Hornbeck (September 30, 1875 – October 16, 1964) was an American college football coach, lawyer, and real estate developer. Hornbeck was the head football coach at Kalamazoo College in Kalamazoo, Michigan for one season, in 1902, compiling a record of 3–5–1.

Hornbeck was born Lenawee County, Michigan, and raised in Ithaca, Michigan. He attended Kalamazoo College, where he played football as a halfback. Hornbeck earned a Bachelor of Arts from the University of Chicago and a Bachelor of Laws from the University of Michigan. He began practicing law in Kalamazoo, in 1901. Hornbeck founded the Kalamazoo Board of Realtors. He died on October 16, 1964, at his home in Kalamazoo.

== Head coaching record ==
Year	Team	Overall	Conference	Standing	Bowl/playoffs
Kalamazoo (Michigan Intercollegiate Athletic Association) (1902)
1902	Kalamazoo	3–5–1	0–5	T–5th	
Kalamazoo:		3–5–1	0–5		
Total:		3–5–1			
