= Dave Warmack =

American football coach (1947–2017)

Biographical details
- Born: December 19, 1947; Kalamazoo, Michigan, U.S.
- Died: July 6, 2017 (aged 69); Paw Paw, Michigan, U.S.

Coaching career (HC unless noted)
- 1990–1997: Kalamazoo
- 1998–2008: Paw Paw HS (MI)

Head coaching record
- Overall: 33–38–1 (college); 175–86 (high school)

David Dennis Warmack (December 19, 1947 – July 6, 2017) was an American football coach. He served as the head football coach at Kalamazoo College in Kalamazoo, Michigan for eight seasons, from 1990 to 1997, compiling a record of 33–38–1.

Warmack was born on December 19, 1947, in Kalamazoo, Michigan. He earned a Bachelor of Arts degree from Western Michigan University and a master's degree from Central Connecticut State University. Warmack died on July 6, 2017, in Paw Paw, Michigan, after suffering from cancer.

== Head coaching record ==
=== College ===
Year	Team	Overall	Conference	Standing	Bowl/playoffs
Kalamazoo Hornets (Michigan Intercollegiate Athletic Association) (1990–1997)
1990	Kalamazoo	3–5–1	1–3–1	5th	
1991	Kalamazoo	5–4	2–3	T–3rd	
1992	Kalamazoo	3–6	1–4	T–5th	
1993	Kalamazoo	7–2	4–1	2nd	
1994	Kalamazoo	4–5	2–3	T–3rd	
1995	Kalamazoo	4–5	3–2	T–2nd	
1996	Kalamazoo	3–6	2–3	T–3rd	
1997	Kalamazoo	4–5	1–4	5th	
Kalamazoo:		33–38–1	16–23–1		
Total:		33–38–1			
