= Tim Rogers (American football) =

American football player and coach (born 1966)

Biographical details
- Born: July 7, 1966 (age 60)

Playing career
- 1984–1987: Beloit
- Position: Defensive back

Coaching career (HC unless noted)
- 1988–1990: De La Salle Institute (IL) (asst)
- 1991: UNLV (interim DB)
- 1992: Moraine Valley CC (RB)
- ?: Eastern Michigan (GA)
- 1998–2003: Kalamazoo
- 2004: Cornell (OC/QB)
- 2005: DePauw
- 2007–2009: Catholic Central HS (MI)
- 2012–2023: Forest Hills Central HS (MI)

Head coaching record
- Overall: 35–30 (college)

Accomplishments and honors

Championships
- 1 SCAC (2005)

Tim Rogers (born July 7, 1966) is a former American football coach. He served as the head football coach at Kalamazoo College in Kalamazoo, Michigan from 1998 to 2003 and DePauw University in Greencastle, Indiana in 2005, compiling a career college football coaching record of 35–30. Rogers was he head football coach a Catholic Central High School in Grand Rapids, Michigan. He led his teams there to a record of 17–15 in three seasons before he was fired in 2010. Rogers was hired as the head football coach at Forest Hills Central High School in Grand Rapids. He retired from Forest Hills Central in 2023, after leading his team to a Michigan Division 3 state championship.

== Head coaching record ==
=== College ===
Year	Team	Overall	Conference	Standing	Bowl/playoffs
Kalamazoo Hornets (Michigan Intercollegiate Athletic Association) (1998–2003)
1998	Kalamazoo	4–5	2–4	T–5th	
1999	Kalamazoo	3–6	2–4	5th	
2000	Kalamazoo	5–4	3–2	T–2nd	
2001	Kalamazoo	5–4	1–4	5th	
2002	Kalamazoo	5–5	2–4	6th	
2003	Kalamazoo	6–4	2–4	6th	
Kalamazoo:		28–28	12–22		
DePauw Tigers (Southern Collegiate Athletic Conference) (2005)
2005	DePauw	7–2	5–0	T–1st	
DePauw:		7–2	5–0		
Total:		35–30			
