= Lloyd Grow =

American football and basketball coach (1903–1979)

Lloyd E. Grow
- Grow pictured in 1934 University of Wyoming yearbook

Biographical details
- Born: July 23, 1903; Nebraska, U.S.
- Died: June 10, 1979 (aged 75); Dickson, Tennessee, U.S.
- Education: Northeastern Oklahoma A&M (1929)

Playing career

Football
- 1926–1927: Nebraska
- Position: Center

Coaching career (HC unless noted)

Football
- 1933–1937: Wyoming (line)
- 1939: Henderson State
- 1946: Kalamazoo (line)
- 1949–1952: Kalamazoo

Basketball
- 1946–1953: Kalamazoo

Head coaching record
- Overall: 16–24–2 (football)

Lloyd Eugene "Dob" Grow (July 23, 1903 – June 10, 1979) was an American college football and college basketball coach. He served as the head football coach at Henderson State Teachers College—now known as Henderson State University—in Arkadelphia, Arkansas in 1939 and Kalamazoo College in Kalamazoo, Michigan from 1949 to 1952, compiling a career college football head coaching record of 16–24–2. Grow was an alumnus of Northeastern Oklahoma A&M College and the University of Nebraska, where he received his Bachelor of Arts. Grow was an assistant at the University of Wyoming.

== Coaching career ==
Grow was the head football coach at Kalamazoo College in Kalamazoo, Michigan. He held that position for four seasons, from 1949 until 1952. His coaching record at Kalamazoo was 12–20–1.

== Death ==
Grow died in June 1979. An obituary appeared in the Sports News on June 30, 1979.

== Head coaching record ==
=== Football ===
Year	Team	Overall	Conference	Standing	Bowl/playoffs
Henderson State Reddies (Arkansas Intercollegiate Conference) (1939)
1939	Henderson State	4–4–1	3–1–1		
Henderson State:		4–4–1	3–1–1		
Kalamazoo Hornets (Michigan Intercollegiate Athletic Association) (1949–1952)
1949	Kalamazoo	2–6	1–4	5th	
1950	Kalamazoo	5–4	4–1	2nd	
1951	Kalamazoo	2–6	2–3	T–4th	
1952	Kalamazoo	3–4–1	2–3	T–3rd	
Kalamazoo:		12–20–1	9–11		
Total:		16–24–2			
