= Joseph Rowe =

American football coach and real estate dealer (1872–1931)

Biographical details
- Born: August 20, 1872
- Died: August 19, 1931 (aged 58); Chicago, Illinois, U.S.

Playing career
- 1895–1899: Bucknell
- Position: Tackle

Coaching career (HC unless noted)
- 1903: Kalamazoo

Head coaching record
- Overall: 6–2

Joseph Zerbe Rowe (August 20, 1872 – August 19, 1931) was an American college football coach and real estate dealer. He was the head football coach at Kalamazoo College in Kalamazoo, Michigan, serving for one season, in 1903, and compiling a record of 6–2.

Rowe played college football at Bucknell University from 1895 to 1899. Before going to Kalamazoo in 1903, he was a student at the University of Chicago. Rowe later went into the real estate business in Chicago, where was a partner of the firm of Rowe and Whitner. A native of Reading, Pennsylvania, Rowe was a veteran of the Spanish–American War. He was also a graduate of Crozer Theological Seminary and an ordained Baptist minister. Rowe died on August 19, 1931, at his home in Chicago.

== Head coaching record ==
Year	Team	Overall	Conference	Standing	Bowl/playoffs
Kalamazoo (Michigan Intercollegiate Athletic Association) (1903)
1903	Kalamazoo	6–2	5–2	3rd	
Kalamazoo:		6–2	5–2		
Total:		6–2			
