= Ralph H. Young =

American college football coach and politician

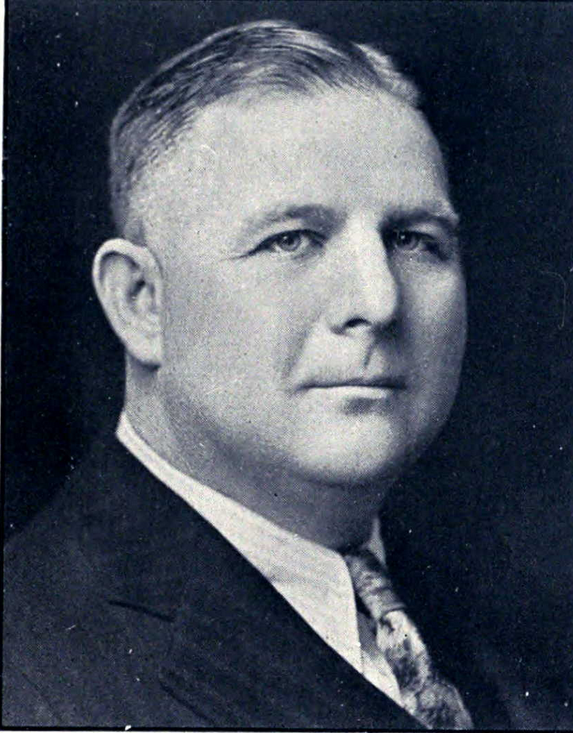

Biographical details
- Born: December 27, 1889; Crown Point, Indiana, U.S.
- Died: January 23, 1962 (aged 72); East Lansing, Michigan, U.S.

Playing career

Football
- 1910: Chicago
- 1913–1914: Washington & Jefferson

Track and field
- ?–1915: Washington & Jefferson
- Positions: Fullback (football); Hammer throw (track and field)

Coaching career (HC unless noted)

Football
- 1915: DePauw
- 1916–1917: Kalamazoo
- 1919–1922: Kalamazoo
- 1923–1927: Michigan Agricultural/State

Basketball
- 1915–1916: DePauw
- 1916–1923: Kalamazoo

Baseball
- c. 1918: Kalamazoo

Administrative career (AD unless noted)
- 1923–1954: Michigan Agricultural/State

Head coaching record
- Overall: 56–41–3 (football); 100–45 (basketball)

Accomplishments and honors

Championships
- Football; 3 MIAA (1916, 1919, 1921)

Ralph Hayward Young (December 17, 1889 – January 23, 1962) was an American college football and college basketball coach, athletics administrator, and state legislator. He was the head football coach at DePauw University in 1915, Kalamazoo College from 1916 to 1917 and 1919 to 1922, and Michigan Agricultural College / Michigan State College—now known as Michigan State University—from 1923 to 1927. During his career as a head football coach, he compiled record of 56–41–3, including an 18–22–1 mark at Michigan Agricultural/State. Young was also the head basketball coach at DePauw during the 1915–16 season and Kalamazoo from 1916 to 1923, tallying a career college basketball coaching mark of 100–45. In addition, he served as Michigan State's athletic director from 1923 until 1954.

Young played football at the University of Chicago in 1910. After transferring to Washington & Jefferson College in Washington, Pennsylvania, he played on the Washington & Jefferson Red and Black football team in 1913 and 1914. He was also elected captain of Washington and & Jefferson's track and field team, and competed in the hammer throw.

Young was elected to three terms in the Michigan House of Representatives on the Republican ticket. He represented East Lansing in Ingham County's 2nd state House district. He was first elected in 1956 and died in office on January 23, 1962, at his home in East Lansing, Michigan.

In 1962, he was elected to the Michigan Sports Hall of Fame. He was elected to the National Association of Collegiate Directors of Athletics Hall of Fame in 1979 and the Kalamazoo College Hall of Fame in 1986.

== Head coaching record ==
=== Football ===
Year	Team	Overall	Conference	Standing	Bowl/playoffs
DePauw (Independent) (1915)
1915	DePauw	5–3			
DePauw:		5–3			
Kalamazoo Baptists (Michigan Intercollegiate Athletic Association) (1916–1917)
1916	Kalamazoo	7–0	5–0	1st	
1917	Kalamazoo	5–5	4–1	2nd	
Kalamazoo Baptists (Michigan Intercollegiate Athletic Association) (1919–1922)
1919	Kalamazoo	5–2	4–0	1st	
1920	Kalamazoo	5–3–1	3–1	2nd	
1921	Kalamazoo	7–2	3–0	1st	
1922	Kalamazoo	4–4–1	1–1–1	3rd	
Kalamazoo:		33–16–2	20–3–1		
Michigan Agricultural Aggies / Michigan State Spartans (Independent) (1923–1927)
1923	Michigan Agricultural	3–5			
1924	Michigan Agricultural	5–3			
1925	Michigan State	3–5			
1926	Michigan State	3–4–1			
1927	Michigan State	4–5			
Michigan State:		18–22–1			
Total:		56–41–3			
National championship Conference title Conference division title or championship game berth
