= Wesley Clapp =

American football coach (1880–1937)

Wes Clapp
Biographical details
- Born: July 16, 1880; Oshtemo Township, Michigan, U.S.
- Died: April 19, 1937 (aged 56); Grand Rapids, Michigan, U.S.

Playing career
- 1900: Kalamazoo
- 1903: Kalamazoo
- Position: Fullback

Coaching career (HC unless noted)
- 1904: Kalamazoo

Head coaching record
- Overall: 1–6

Wesley Dale Clapp (July 16, 1880 – April 19, 1937) was an American college football coach and salesman. He served as the head football coach at Kalamazoo College in Kalamazoo, Michigan for one season, in 1904, compiling a record of 1–6.

Clapp was born on July 16, 1880, in Oshtemo Township, Michigan, to Ashley and Francis Clapp. He served with the 32nd Michigan Volunteers during the Spanish–American War. Clapp attended public school in Kalamazoo and then Kalamazoo College. He played football as a fullback at Kalamazoo College in 1900 and 1903.

Clapp later worked in gas sales in Kalamazoo. In the 1920s, he moved to Grand Rapids, Michigan, where was again engaged in sales. He died on April 19, 1937, at the St. Mary's Hospital, in Grand Rapids, following a brief illness.

== Head coaching record ==
Year	Team	Overall	Conference	Standing	Bowl/playoffs
Kalamazoo (Michigan Intercollegiate Athletic Association) (1904)
1904	Kalamazoo	1–6	1–5	5th	
Kalamazoo:		1–6	1–5		
Total:		1–6			
