= Van Nickert =

American football coach (born 1952)

Current position
- Title: Assistant coach
- Team: Kalamazoo
- Conference: MIAA

Biographical details
- Born: May 14, 1952 (age 74)
- Education: Western Michigan University (1981)

Coaching career (HC unless noted)
- 1983–2003: Kalamazoo (assistant)
- 2004: Kalamazoo
- 2005–present: Kalamazoo (assistant)

Head coaching record
- Overall: 1–9

Van Nickert (born May 14, 1952) is an American college football coach. He is currently as assistant football coach at Kalamazoo College, where has served since 1983. Nickert was the head football coach at Kalamazoo for one season in 2004.

== Head coaching record ==
Year	Team	Overall	Conference	Standing	Bowl/playoffs
Kalamazoo Hornets (Michigan Intercollegiate Athletic Association) (2004)
2004	Kalamazoo	1–9	0–7	8th	
Kalamazoo:		1–9	0–7		
Total:		1–9			
