= Ed Baker (American football coach) =

Biographical details
- Born: June 24, 1931; Cleveland, Ohio, U.S.
- Died: December 11, 2013 (aged 82); Fort Myers, Florida, U.S.

Playing career

Football
- 1951–1952: Denison

Coaching career (HC unless noted)

Football
- 1958–1966: Haverford School (PA)
- 1967–1983: Kalamazoo
- 1988–1989: Kalamazoo

Lacrosse
- 1954: Ohio State

Head coaching record
- Overall: 62–89–5 (college football); 50–21–2 (high school football); 2–8–1 (college lacrosse)

Edward D. Baker (June 24, 1931 – December 11, 2013) was an American football, lacrosse, and track coach. He served two stints as the head football coach at Kalamazoo College in Kalamazoo, Michigan, from 1967 to 1983 and again from 1988 to 1989, compiling a record of 62–89–5

Baker was born on June 24, 1931, in Cleveland. He graduated from Brooklyn High School in Brooklyn, Ohio before attending Denison University in Granville, Ohio, where he played college football. After graduating from Denison, Baker moved on to Ohio State University to pursue a master's degree and serve as a graduate assistant in the school's physical education department. He was head coach of Ohio State's varsity lacrosse team in 1954.

Baker's grandson, Matt Baker, played football as a quarterback at the University of North Carolina at Chapel Hill.

== Head coaching record ==
=== Football ===
Year	Team	Overall	Conference	Standing	Bowl/playoffs
Kalamazoo Hornets (Michigan Intercollegiate Athletic Association) (1967–1983)
1967	Kalamazoo	2–6	1–4	T–5th	
1968	Kalamazoo	2–6	1–4	T–5th	
1969	Kalamazoo	4–4	3–2	3rd	
1970	Kalamazoo	3–5	1–4	5th	
1971	Kalamazoo	5–3	2–3	T–4th	
1972	Kalamazoo	2–5–1	1–3–1	5th	
1973	Kalamazoo	4–4	2–3	T–4th	
1974	Kalamazoo	2–6	1–4	5th	
1975	Kalamazoo	4–4	1–4	6th	
1976	Kalamazoo	3–4–1	2–3	4th	
1977	Kalamazoo	3–5	1–4	5th	
1978	Kalamazoo	6–2	3–2	3rd	
1979	Kalamazoo	5–3	2–3	4th	
1980	Kalamazoo	3–5	1–4	T–5th	
1981	Kalamazoo	3–6	2–3	4th	
1982	Kalamazoo	5–2–1	2–2–1	T–3rd	
1983	Kalamazoo	5–4	2–3	T–4th	
Kalamazoo Hornets (Michigan Intercollegiate Athletic Association) (1988–1989)
1988	Kalamazoo	0–8–1	0–4–1	6th	
1989	Kalamazoo	1–7–1	1–4	T–5th	
Kalamazoo:		62–89–5	29–63–3		
Total:		62–89–5			
