= Maurice Waterbury =

American football coach, educator (1875–1947)

Biographical details
- Born: September 26, 1875; Ionia, Michigan, U.S.
- Died: June 25, 1947 (aged 71); Grosse Pointe Farms, Michigan, U.S.

Playing career
- 1897–1898: Kalamazoo

Coaching career (HC unless noted)
- 1901: Kalamazoo

Head coaching record
- Overall: 2–5–1

Maurice Glenn Waterbury (September 26, 1875 – June 25, 1947) was an American college football coach and educator. He served as the head football coach at Kalamazoo College in Kalamazoo, Michigan for one season, in 1901, compiling a record of 2–5–1.

Waterbury later taught in Jackson, Michigan and Charlotte, Michigan and before going to teach at Eastern High School in Detroit, in 1908. He continued to teach in Detroit until his retirement in 1945. Waterbury died on June 25, 1947, at Cottage Hospital in Grosse Pointe Farms, Michigan.

== Head coaching record ==
Year	Team	Overall	Conference	Standing	Bowl/playoffs
Kalamazoo (Michigan Intercollegiate Athletic Association) (1901)
1901	Kalamazoo	2–5–1	2–5	4th	
Kalamazoo:		2–5–1	2–5		
Total:		2–5–1			
