= Maurice Post =

American sports coach and educator (1882–1974)

Biographical details
- Born: July 3, 1882; Paradise Township, Michigan, U.S.
- Died: August 7, 1974 (aged 92); Walnut Creek, California, U.S.

Playing career

Football
- 1905: Kalamazoo

Baseball
- 1904–1905: Kalamazoo
- Positions: Halfback; Catcher (baseball)

Coaching career (HC unless noted)

Football
- 1906: Plainwell HS (MI)
- 1906: Kalamazoo

Baseball
- 1907: Western State Normal
- c. 1914–1920: Stadium HS (WA)

Head coaching record
- Overall: 1–3–1 (college football)

Maurice Eaton Post (July 3, 1882 – August 7, 1974) was an American and educator and football and baseball coach . He was the head football coach at Kalamazoo College in Kalamazoo, Michigan for one season, in 1906, compiling a record of 1–3–1.

Post was captain of the Kalamazoo football team in 1905. He was also captain of Kalamazoo's baseball team, on which he played as a catcher.

In 1906, Post was appointed to coach the football team at Plainwell High School in Plainwell, Michigan. He left Plainwell later that fall to coach at Kalamazoo. The follow spring, he coached the baseball team at Western State Normal School—now known as Western Michigan University. In 1908, Post was teaching science at the high school in Cass City, Michigan.

Post moved to La Conner, Washington, in 1909, to become the principal and coach at the high school there. He later taught and coached football and baseball in Olympia, Washington and Walla Walla, Washington. In 1914, he was hired to teach science and coach baseball at Stadium High School in Tacoma, Washington. In 1920, he was appointed head of the science program for the school district in Berkeley, California. He retired from the Berkeley school system in the late 1940s. Post died on August 7, 1974, at a hospital in Walnut Creek, California, following a brief illness.

== Head coaching record ==
=== College football ===
Year	Team	Overall	Conference	Standing	Bowl/playoffs
Kalamazoo (Michigan Intercollegiate Athletic Association) (1906)
1906	Kalamazoo	1–3–1	0–3–1	5th	
Kalamazoo:		1–3–1	0–3–1		
Total:		1–3–1			
