= 1994 NCAA Division III football season =

American college football season

- Regular season: August – November 1994
- Playoffs: November – December 1994
- National championship: Salem Football Stadium; Salem, VA
- Champion: Albion
- Gagliardi Trophy: Carey Bender, Coe (RB)

The 1994 NCAA Division III football season, part of the college football season organized by the NCAA at the Division III level in the United States, began in August 1994, and concluded with the NCAA Division III Football Championship, also known as the Stagg Bowl, in December 1994 at Salem Football Stadium in Salem, Virginia. The Albion Britons won their first Division III championship by defeating the Washington & Jefferson Presidents, 38−15. The Gagliardi Trophy, given to the most outstanding player in Division III football, was awarded to Carey Bender, running back from Coe.

== Conference Changes ==
| School | 1991 Conference | 1992 Conference |
|---|---|---|
| Chapman | Revived Program | D-III Independent |
| Salve Regina | D-III Independent | ECFC |
| Upsala | MAC | Dropped Program |

== Conference standings ==
1994 Association of Mideast Colleges football standings
| | Conf. | | | | | Overall |
| Team | W | | L | | T | W | | L | | T |
|---|---|---|---|---|---|---|---|---|---|---|
| Thomas More + | 2 | – | 1 | – | 0 | 7 | – | 3 | – | 0 |
| Bluffton + | 2 | – | 1 | – | 0 | 4 | – | 5 | – | 0 |
| Defiance | 1 | – | 2 | – | 0 | 6 | – | 4 | – | 0 |
| Wilmington (OH) | 1 | – | 2 | – | 0 | 3 | – | 6 | – | 0 |
+ – Conference co-champions

1994 Centennial Conference football standings
| | Conf. | | | | | Overall |
| Team | W | | L | | T | W | | L | | T |
|---|---|---|---|---|---|---|---|---|---|---|
| Dickinson $^ | 7 | – | 0 | – | 0 | 10 | – | 1 | – | 0 |
| Gettysburg | 6 | – | 1 | – | 0 | 8 | – | 2 | – | 0 |
| Western Maryland | 4 | – | 3 | – | 0 | 5 | – | 4 | – | 0 |
| Johns Hopkins | 4 | – | 3 | – | 0 | 4 | – | 6 | – | 0 |
| Swarthmore | 3 | – | 4 | – | 0 | 3 | – | 7 | – | 0 |
| Ursinus | 3 | – | 4 | – | 0 | 3 | – | 7 | – | 0 |
| Muhlenberg | 1 | – | 6 | – | 0 | 2 | – | 8 | – | 0 |
| Franklin & Marshall | 0 | – | 7 | – | 0 | 1 | – | 9 | – | 0 |
$ – Conference champion; ^ – NCAA Division III playoff participant

1994 College Conference of Illinois and Wisconsin football standings
| | Conf. | | | | | Overall |
| Team | W | | L | | T | W | | L | | T |
|---|---|---|---|---|---|---|---|---|---|---|
| Illinois Wesleyan + | 6 | – | 1 | – | 0 | 8 | – | 1 | – | 0 |
| Augustana (IL) +^ | 6 | – | 1 | – | 0 | 8 | – | 2 | – | 0 |
| Wheaton (IL) | 5 | – | 2 | – | 0 | 7 | – | 2 | – | 0 |
| Millikin | 5 | – | 2 | – | 0 | 6 | – | 3 | – | 0 |
| Elmhurst | 2 | – | 5 | – | 0 | 3 | – | 6 | – | 0 |
| North Central (IL) | 2 | – | 5 | – | 0 | 3 | – | 6 | – | 0 |
| North Park | 1 | – | 6 | – | 0 | 3 | – | 6 | – | 0 |
| Carthage | 1 | – | 6 | – | 0 | 1 | – | 8 | – | 0 |
+ – Conference co-champions; ^ – NCAA Division III playoff participant

1994 Eastern Collegiate Football Conference standings
| | Conf. | | | | | Overall |
| Team | W | | L | | T | W | | L | | T |
|---|---|---|---|---|---|---|---|---|---|---|
| Bentley $ | 6 | – | 0 | – | 0 | 11 | – | 0 | – | 0 |
| Assumption | 5 | – | 1 | – | 0 | 7 | – | 3 | – | 0 |
| Stonehill | 4 | – | 2 | – | 0 | 7 | – | 3 | – | 0 |
| MIT | 3 | – | 3 | – | 0 | 4 | – | 5 | – | 0 |
| Nichols | 2 | – | 4 | – | 0 | 2 | – | 7 | – | 0 |
| Curry | 1 | – | 5 | – | 0 | 1 | – | 7 | – | 1 |
| Western New England | 0 | – | 6 | – | 0 | 0 | – | 9 | – | 0 |
| Salve Regina | 6 | – | 0 | – | 0 | 8 | – | 1 | – | 0 |
$ – Conference champion

1994 Freedom Football Conference standings
| | Conf. | | | | | Overall |
| Team | W | | L | | T | W | | L | | T |
|---|---|---|---|---|---|---|---|---|---|---|
| Plymouth State +^ | 6 | – | 0 | – | 0 | 10 | – | 1 | – | 0 |
| Merchant Marine +^ | 5 | – | 0 | – | 0 | 7 | – | 3 | – | 0 |
| Stony Brook | 4 | – | 2 | – | 0 | 7 | – | 4 | – | 0 |
| WPI | 3 | – | 2 | – | 0 | 5 | – | 4 | – | 0 |
| Coast Guard | 2 | – | 4 | – | 0 | 4 | – | 5 | – | 0 |
| Norwich | 2 | – | 5 | – | 0 | 3 | – | 6 | – | 0 |
| Western Connecticut | 1 | – | 5 | – | 0 | 1 | – | 9 | – | 0 |
| UMass Lowell | 0 | – | 5 | – | 0 | 0 | – | 10 | – | 0 |
+ – Conference co-champions; ^ – NCAA Division III playoff participant

1994 Illini–Badger Football Conference standings
| | Conf. | | | | | Overall |
| Team | W | | L | | T | W | | L | | T |
|---|---|---|---|---|---|---|---|---|---|---|
| Quincy $ | 6 | – | 0 | – | 0 | 8 | – | 1 | – | 0 |
| No. 11 Eureka ^ | 5 | – | 1 | – | 0 | 8 | – | 3 | – | 0 |
| Greenville | 2 | – | 4 | – | 0 | 4 | – | 6 | – | 0 |
| Lakeland | 2 | – | 4 | – | 0 | 4 | – | 6 | – | 0 |
| MacMurray | 2 | – | 4 | – | 0 | 4 | – | 6 | – | 0 |
| Concordia (WI) | 2 | – | 4 | – | 0 | 3 | – | 6 | – | 0 |
| Concordia (IL) | 2 | – | 4 | – | 0 | 2 | – | 7 | – | 1 |
$ – Conference champion; ^ – NAIA Division II playoff participant; Rankings from NAIA Division II poll

1994 Indiana Collegiate Athletic Conference football standings
| | Conf. | | | | | Overall |
| Team | W | | L | | T | W | | L | | T |
|---|---|---|---|---|---|---|---|---|---|---|
| Hanover + | 5 | – | 1 | – | 0 | 8 | – | 2 | – | 0 |
| Wabash + | 5 | – | 1 | – | 0 | 6 | – | 3 | – | 0 |
| Rose–Hulman | 4 | – | 2 | – | 0 | 7 | – | 3 | – | 0 |
| Anderson (IN) | 3 | – | 3 | – | 0 | 6 | – | 4 | – | 0 |
| Franklin (IN) | 3 | – | 3 | – | 0 | 5 | – | 5 | – | 0 |
| DePauw | 1 | – | 5 | – | 0 | 2 | – | 8 | – | 0 |
| Manchester | 0 | – | 6 | – | 0 | 0 | – | 10 | – | 0 |
+ – Conference co-champions

1994 Iowa Conference football standings
| | Conf. | | | | | Overall |
| Team | W | | L | | T | W | | L | | T |
|---|---|---|---|---|---|---|---|---|---|---|
| Central (IA) $^ | 8 | – | 0 | – | 0 | 10 | – | 1 | – | 0 |
| Wartburg ^ | 7 | – | 1 | – | 0 | 10 | – | 2 | – | 0 |
| Upper Iowa | 6 | – | 2 | – | 0 | 7 | – | 3 | – | 0 |
| Simpson (IA) | 5 | – | 3 | – | 0 | 5 | – | 5 | – | 0 |
| Loras | 4 | – | 4 | – | 0 | 5 | – | 5 | – | 0 |
| Buena Vista | 3 | – | 5 | – | 0 | 3 | – | 6 | – | 0 |
| Luther | 2 | – | 6 | – | 0 | 4 | – | 6 | – | 0 |
| Dubuque | 1 | – | 7 | – | 0 | 1 | – | 9 | – | 0 |
| William Penn | 0 | – | 8 | – | 0 | 1 | – | 9 | – | 0 |
$ – Conference champion; ^ – NCAA Division III playoff participant

1994 Michigan Intercollegiate Athletic Association football standings
| | Conf. | | | | | Overall |
| Team | W | | L | | T | W | | L | | T |
|---|---|---|---|---|---|---|---|---|---|---|
| Albion $^ | 5 | – | 0 | – | 0 | 13 | – | 0 | – | 0 |
| Alma | 4 | – | 1 | – | 0 | 8 | – | 1 | – | 0 |
| Hope | 2 | – | 3 | – | 0 | 4 | – | 4 | – | 1 |
| Kalamazoo | 2 | – | 3 | – | 0 | 4 | – | 5 | – | 0 |
| Adrian | 2 | – | 3 | – | 0 | 3 | – | 6 | – | 0 |
| Olivet | 0 | – | 5 | – | 0 | 1 | – | 8 | – | 0 |
$ – Conference champion; ^ – NCAA Division III playoff participant

1994 Middle Atlantic Conference football standings
| | Conf. | | | | | Overall |
| Team | W | | L | | T | W | | L | | T |
|---|---|---|---|---|---|---|---|---|---|---|
Commonwealth
| Widener x^ | 5 | – | 0 | – | 0 | 10 | – | 2 | – | 0 |
| Moravian | 3 | – | 2 | – | 0 | 6 | – | 4 | – | 0 |
| Susquehanna | 3 | – | 2 | – | 0 | 6 | – | 4 | – | 0 |
| Lebanon Valley | 2 | – | 3 | – | 0 | 3 | – | 6 | – | 0 |
| Albright | 2 | – | 3 | – | 0 | 3 | – | 5 | – | 1 |
| Juniata | 0 | – | 5 | – | 0 | 2 | – | 8 | – | 0 |
Freedom
| Wilkes x | 4 | – | 0 | – | 0 | 8 | – | 2 | – | 0 |
| Fairleigh Dickinson–Florham | 2 | – | 2 | – | 0 | 5 | – | 4 | – | 0 |
| Lycoming | 2 | – | 2 | – | 0 | 5 | – | 4 | – | 0 |
| King's (PA) | 1 | – | 3 | – | 0 | 2 | – | 6 | – | 1 |
| Delaware Valley | 1 | – | 3 | – | 0 | 2 | – | 7 | – | 0 |
x – Division champion/co-champions; ^ – NCAA Division III playoff participant

1994 Midwest Conference football standings
| | Conf. | | | | | Overall |
| Team | W | | L | | T | W | | L | | T |
|---|---|---|---|---|---|---|---|---|---|---|
North Division
| Beloit xy | 4 | – | 1 | – | 0 | 7 | – | 3 | – | 0 |
| St. Norbert | 4 | – | 1 | – | 0 | 6 | – | 3 | – | 0 |
| Carroll (WI) | 3 | – | 2 | – | 0 | 6 | – | 3 | – | 0 |
| Ripon | 2 | – | 3 | – | 0 | 4 | – | 5 | – | 0 |
| Lake Forest | 1 | – | 4 | – | 0 | 1 | – | 8 | – | 0 |
| Lawrence | 1 | – | 4 | – | 0 | 2 | – | 7 | – | 0 |
South Division
| Coe xy$ | 4 | – | 1 | – | 0 | 8 | – | 2 | – | 0 |
| Cornell (IA) | 4 | – | 1 | – | 0 | 6 | – | 2 | – | 0 |
| Monmouth (IL) | 3 | – | 2 | – | 0 | 4 | – | 5 | – | 0 |
| Grinnell | 2 | – | 3 | – | 0 | 4 | – | 5 | – | 0 |
| Knox | 1 | – | 4 | – | 0 | 3 | – | 6 | – | 0 |
| Illinois College | 1 | – | 4 | – | 0 | 5 | – | 4 | – | 0 |
Championship: Coe 63, Beloit 48
$ – Conference champion; x – Division champion/co-champions; y – Championship game participant; Final order determined by head-to-head results

1994 Minnesota Intercollegiate Athletic Conference football standings
| | Conf. | | | | | Overall |
| Team | W | | L | | T | W | | L | | T |
|---|---|---|---|---|---|---|---|---|---|---|
| Saint John's (MN) $^ | 8 | – | 1 | – | 0 | 11 | – | 2 | – | 0 |
| Hamline | 7 | – | 2 | – | 0 | 8 | – | 2 | – | 0 |
| Bethel (MN) | 6 | – | 3 | – | 0 | 7 | – | 3 | – | 0 |
| Concordia–Moorhead | 6 | – | 3 | – | 0 | 6 | – | 4 | – | 0 |
| Gustavus Adolphus | 5 | – | 4 | – | 0 | 5 | – | 5 | – | 0 |
| Augsburg | 4 | – | 5 | – | 0 | 5 | – | 5 | – | 0 |
| St. Thomas (MN) | 4 | – | 5 | – | 0 | 4 | – | 6 | – | 0 |
| Carleton | 3 | – | 6 | – | 0 | 3 | – | 7 | – | 0 |
| St. Olaf | 2 | – | 7 | – | 0 | 2 | – | 8 | – | 0 |
| Macalester | 0 | – | 9 | – | 0 | 0 | – | 10 | – | 0 |
$ – Conference champion; ^ – NCAA Division III playoff participant

1994 New England Football Conference standings
| | Conf. | | | | | Overall |
| Team | W | | L | | T | W | | L | | T |
|---|---|---|---|---|---|---|---|---|---|---|
| UMass Dartmouth + | 7 | – | 1 | – | 0 | 8 | – | 3 | – | 0 |
| Maine Maritime + | 7 | – | 1 | – | 0 | 7 | – | 3 | – | 0 |
| Worcester State | 6 | – | 2 | – | 0 | 8 | – | 2 | – | 0 |
| Bridgewater State | 6 | – | 2 | – | 0 | 6 | – | 4 | – | 0 |
| Westfield State | 4 | – | 4 | – | 0 | 5 | – | 5 | – | 0 |
| Massachusetts Maritime | 3 | – | 5 | – | 0 | 4 | – | 6 | – | 0 |
| Fitchburg State | 2 | – | 6 | – | 0 | 3 | – | 6 | – | 0 |
| Framingham State | 1 | – | 7 | – | 0 | 1 | – | 7 | – | 1 |
| UMass–Boston | 0 | – | 8 | – | 0 | 0 | – | 9 | – | 0 |
+ – Conference co-champions

1994 New England Small College Athletic Conference football standings
| | Conf. | | | | | Overall |
| Team | W | | L | | T | W | | L | | T |
|---|---|---|---|---|---|---|---|---|---|---|
| Williams | 8 | – | 0 | – | 0 | 8 | – | 0 | – | 0 |
| Colby | 7 | – | 1 | – | 0 | 7 | – | 1 | – | 0 |
| Trinity (CT) | 6 | – | 2 | – | 0 | 6 | – | 2 | – | 0 |
| Amherst | 5 | – | 3 | – | 0 | 5 | – | 3 | – | 0 |
| Hamilton | 5 | – | 3 | – | 0 | 5 | – | 3 | – | 0 |
| Middlebury | 3 | – | 5 | – | 0 | 3 | – | 5 | – | 0 |
| Bowdoin | 2 | – | 6 | – | 0 | 2 | – | 6 | – | 0 |
| Tufts | 2 | – | 6 | – | 0 | 2 | – | 6 | – | 0 |
| Wesleyan | 2 | – | 6 | – | 0 | 2 | – | 6 | – | 0 |
| Bates | 0 | – | 8 | – | 0 | 0 | – | 8 | – | 0 |
No conference champion recognized

1994 New Jersey Athletic Conference football standings
| | Conf. | | | | | Overall |
| Team | W | | L | | T | W | | L | | T |
|---|---|---|---|---|---|---|---|---|---|---|
| Kean + | 3 | – | 1 | – | 1 | 7 | – | 2 | – | 1 |
| Trenton State + | 3 | – | 1 | – | 1 | 5 | – | 4 | – | 1 |
| Rowan | 3 | – | 2 | – | 0 | 6 | – | 3 | – | 0 |
| William Paterson | 3 | – | 2 | – | 0 | 3 | – | 7 | – | 0 |
| Montclair State | 2 | – | 3 | – | 0 | 4 | – | 6 | – | 0 |
| Jersey City State | 0 | – | 5 | – | 0 | 0 | – | 9 | – | 0 |
+ – Conference co-champions

1994 North Coast Athletic Conference football standings
| | Conf. | | | | | Overall |
| Team | W | | L | | T | W | | L | | T |
|---|---|---|---|---|---|---|---|---|---|---|
| Allegheny $^ | 8 | – | 0 | – | 0 | 10 | – | 1 | – | 0 |
| Wittenberg | 6 | – | 1 | – | 0 | 8 | – | 2 | – | 0 |
| Ohio Wesleyan | 6 | – | 2 | – | 0 | 7 | – | 3 | – | 0 |
| Earlham | 5 | – | 3 | – | 0 | 7 | – | 3 | – | 0 |
| Kenyon | 4 | – | 4 | – | 0 | 5 | – | 5 | – | 0 |
| Denison | 3 | – | 5 | – | 0 | 3 | – | 7 | – | 0 |
| Case Western Reserve | 1 | – | 5 | – | 0 | 1 | – | 9 | – | 0 |
| Wooster | 1 | – | 7 | – | 0 | 1 | – | 9 | – | 0 |
| Oberlin | 0 | – | 7 | – | 0 | 0 | – | 9 | – | 0 |
$ – Conference champion; ^ – NCAA Division III playoff participant

1994 Ohio Athletic Conference football standings
| | Conf. | | | | | Overall |
| Team | W | | L | | T | W | | L | | T |
|---|---|---|---|---|---|---|---|---|---|---|
| Baldwin–Wallace + | 8 | – | 1 | – | 0 | 9 | – | 1 | – | 0 |
| John Carroll + | 8 | – | 1 | – | 0 | 9 | – | 1 | – | 0 |
| Mount Union +^ | 8 | – | 1 | – | 0 | 10 | – | 2 | – | 0 |
| Heidelberg | 6 | – | 3 | – | 0 | 7 | – | 3 | – | 0 |
| Marietta | 4 | – | 5 | – | 0 | 5 | – | 5 | – | 0 |
| Ohio Northern | 4 | – | 5 | – | 0 | 4 | – | 6 | – | 0 |
| Hiram | 3 | – | 6 | – | 0 | 4 | – | 6 | – | 0 |
| Capital | 2 | – | 7 | – | 0 | 2 | – | 8 | – | 0 |
| Muskingum | 2 | – | 7 | – | 0 | 2 | – | 8 | – | 0 |
| Otterbein | 0 | – | 9 | – | 0 | 0 | – | 10 | – | 0 |
+ – Conference co-champions; ^ – NCAA Division III playoff participant

1994 Old Dominion Athletic Conference football standings
| | Conf. | | | | | Overall |
| Team | W | | L | | T | W | | L | | T |
|---|---|---|---|---|---|---|---|---|---|---|
| Emory & Henry $ | 4 | – | 1 | – | 0 | 8 | – | 2 | – | 0 |
| Guilford | 3 | – | 2 | – | 0 | 8 | – | 2 | – | 0 |
| Randolph–Macon | 3 | – | 2 | – | 0 | 4 | – | 5 | – | 0 |
| Hampden–Sydney | 3 | – | 2 | – | 0 | 4 | – | 6 | – | 0 |
| Washington and Lee | 2 | – | 3 | – | 0 | 5 | – | 4 | – | 0 |
| Bridgewater | 0 | – | 5 | – | 0 | 0 | – | 10 | – | 0 |
$ – Conference champion

1994 Presidents' Athletic Conference football standings
| | Conf. | | | | | Overall |
| Team | W | | L | | T | W | | L | | T |
|---|---|---|---|---|---|---|---|---|---|---|
| Washington & Jefferson $^ | 4 | – | 0 | – | 0 | 11 | – | 2 | – | 0 |
| Grove City | 2 | – | 2 | – | 0 | 4 | – | 5 | – | 0 |
| Waynesburg | 2 | – | 2 | – | 0 | 4 | – | 5 | – | 0 |
| Bethany (WV) | 2 | – | 2 | – | 0 | 3 | – | 6 | – | 0 |
| Thiel | 0 | – | 4 | – | 0 | 0 | – | 10 | – | 0 |
$ – Conference champion; ^ – NCAA Division III playoff participant

1994 Southern California Intercollegiate Athletic Conference football standings
| | Conf. | | | | | Overall |
| Team | W | | L | | T | W | | L | | T |
|---|---|---|---|---|---|---|---|---|---|---|
| La Verne $^ | 6 | – | 0 | – | 0 | 9 | – | 1 | – | 0 |
| Redlands | 5 | – | 1 | – | 0 | 6 | – | 2 | – | 1 |
| Occidental | 4 | – | 2 | – | 0 | 6 | – | 3 | – | 0 |
| Cal Lutheran | 3 | – | 3 | – | 0 | 4 | – | 5 | – | 0 |
| Claremont-Mudd | 2 | – | 4 | – | 0 | 3 | – | 6 | – | 0 |
| Whittier | 1 | – | 5 | – | 0 | 1 | – | 8 | – | 0 |
| Pomona-Pitzer | 0 | – | 6 | – | 0 | 1 | – | 8 | – | 0 |
$ – Conference champion; ^ – NCAA Division III playoff participant

1994 Southern Collegiate Athletic Conference football standings
| | Conf. | | | | | Overall |
| Team | W | | L | | T | W | | L | | T |
|---|---|---|---|---|---|---|---|---|---|---|
| Trinity (TX) $^ | 4 | – | 0 | – | 0 | 10 | – | 1 | – | 0 |
| Centre | 3 | – | 1 | – | 0 | 8 | – | 2 | – | 0 |
| Millsaps | 2 | – | 2 | – | 0 | 4 | – | 6 | – | 0 |
| Sewanee | 1 | – | 3 | – | 0 | 1 | – | 8 | – | 0 |
| Rhodes | 0 | – | 4 | – | 0 | 1 | – | 8 | – | 1 |
$ – Conference champion; ^ – NCAA Division III playoff participant

1994 University Athletic Association football standings
| | Conf. | | | | | Overall |
| Team | W | | L | | T | W | | L | | T |
|---|---|---|---|---|---|---|---|---|---|---|
| Washington (MO) + | 3 | – | 1 | – | 0 | 7 | – | 3 | – | 0 |
| Carnegie Mellon + | 3 | – | 1 | – | 0 | 7 | – | 3 | – | 0 |
| Chicago | 2 | – | 2 | – | 0 | 5 | – | 5 | – | 0 |
| Rochester (NY) | 2 | – | 2 | – | 0 | 3 | – | 6 | – | 0 |
| Case Wester Reserve* | 0 | – | 4 | – | 0 | 1 | – | 9 | – | 0 |
+ – Conference co-champions; * - Case Western Reserve held a dual affiliation and played a complete conference schedule in both the UAA and the NCAC

1994 Wisconsin State University Conference football standings
| | Conf. | | | | | Overall |
| Team | W | | L | | T | W | | L | | T |
|---|---|---|---|---|---|---|---|---|---|---|
| Wisconsin–Whitewater $ | 6 | – | 1 | – | 0 | 8 | – | 2 | – | 0 |
| Wisconsin–La Crosse | 5 | – | 2 | – | 0 | 8 | – | 2 | – | 0 |
| Wisconsin–River Falls | 5 | – | 2 | – | 0 | 7 | – | 3 | – | 0 |
| Wisconsin–Stevens Point | 5 | – | 2 | – | 0 | 7 | – | 3 | – | 0 |
| Wisconsin–Platteville | 3 | – | 4 | – | 0 | 5 | – | 5 | – | 0 |
| Wisconsin–Stout | 2 | – | 5 | – | 0 | 4 | – | 6 | – | 0 |
| Wisconsin–Eau Claire | 1 | – | 6 | – | 0 | 2 | – | 8 | – | 0 |
| Wisconsin–Oshkosh | 1 | – | 6 | – | 0 | 2 | – | 8 | – | 0 |
$ – Conference champion

1994 NCAA Division III independents football records
| | Conf. | | | Overall |
| Team | W | L | T | W | | L | | T |
|---|---|---|---|---|---|---|---|---|
| Catholic University | | – | | 8 | – | 2 | – | 0 |
| Union (NY) | | – | | 8 | – | 2 | – | 0 |
| Wesley | | – | | 8 | – | 2 | – | 0 |
| Frostburg State | | – | | 8 | – | 2 | – | 1 |
| Ithaca ^ | | – | | 10 | – | 3 | – | 0 |
| RPI | | – | | 7 | – | 2 | – | 0 |
| Chapman | | – | | 6 | – | 2 | – | 1 |
| Hartwick | | – | | 7 | – | 3 | – | 0 |
| Alfred | | – | | 6 | – | 3 | – | 1 |
| Brockport | | – | | 6 | – | 3 | – | 1 |
| Cortland | | – | | 7 | – | 4 | – | 0 |
| Buffalo State ^ | | – | | 6 | – | 4 | – | 0 |
| St. John Fisher | | – | | 5 | – | 4 | – | 0 |
| Colorado College | | – | | 4 | – | 4 | – | 1 |
| Maryville (TN) | | – | | 5 | – | 5 | – | 0 |
| Methodist | | – | | 5 | – | 5 | – | 0 |
| Ferrum | | – | | 4 | – | 5 | – | 0 |
| Albany | | – | | 4 | – | 6 | – | 0 |
| Hobart | | – | | 3 | – | 7 | – | 0 |
| Aurora | | – | | 2 | – | 5 | – | 2 |
| Menlo | | – | | 2 | – | 7 | – | 0 |
| Salisbury State | | – | | 2 | – | 7 | – | 0 |
| Gallaudet | | – | | 1 | – | 7 | – | 0 |
| St. Lawrence | | – | | 0 | – | 9 | – | 0 |
^ – NCAA Division III playoff participant

== Conference champions ==
Conference champions
- Association of Mideast Colleges – Bluffton and Thomas More
- Centennial Conference – Dickinson
- College Conference of Illinois and Wisconsin – Augustana (IL) and Illinois Wesleyan
- Freedom Football Conference – Merchant Marine and Plymouth State
- Indiana Collegiate Athletic Conference – Hanover and Wabash
- Iowa Intercollegiate Athletic Conference – Central (IA)
- Michigan Intercollegiate Athletic Association – Albion
- Middle Atlantic Conference – Widener
- Midwest Conference – Coe
- Minnesota Intercollegiate Athletic Conference – Saint John's (MN)
- New England Football Conference – Maine Maritime and Massachusetts–Dartmouth
- New Jersey State Athletic Conference – Kean and Trenton State
- North Coast Athletic Conference – Allegheny
- Ohio Athletic Conference – Baldwin Wallace, John Carroll, and Mount Union
- Old Dominion Athletic Conference – Emory & Henry
- Presidents' Athletic Conference – Washington & Jefferson
- Southern California Intercollegiate Athletic Conference – La Verne
- Southern Collegiate Athletic Conference – Trinity (TX)
- Texas Intercollegiate Athletic Association– Hardin–Simmons, Howard Payne, and Midwestern State
- University Athletic Association – Carnegie Mellon and Washington–Saint Louis
- Upper Midwest Athletic Conference – Mount Senario
- Wisconsin Intercollegiate Athletic Conference – Wisconsin–Whitewater

== Postseason ==
The 1994 NCAA Division III Football Championship playoffs were the 22nd annual single-elimination tournament to determine the national champion of men's NCAA Division III college football. The championship Stagg Bowl game was held at Salem Football Stadium in Salem, Virginia for the second time. As of 2014, Salem has remained the yearly host of the Stagg Bowl. Like the previous nine tournaments, this year's bracket featured sixteen teams.

=== Playoff bracket ===
Regionals; Campus Sites
Mount Union | 28
Allegheny | 19
Albion | 28
Augustana (IL) | 21
Wartburg | 22
Central (IA) | 21
Saint John's (MN) | 51
La Verne | 12
Widener | 14
Dickinson | 0
Washington & Jefferson | 28
Trinity (TX) | 0
Plymouth State | 19
Merchant Marine | 18
Ithaca | 10**
Buffalo State | 7

Quarterfinals; Campus Sites
Mount Union | 33
Albion | 34
Wartburg | 14
Saint John's (MN) | 24
Washington & Jefferson | 37
Widener | 21
Plymouth State | 7
Ithaca | 22

Semifinals; Campus Sites
Albion | 19
Saint John's (MN) | 16
Washington & Jefferson | 23
Ithaca | 19

National Championship Game; Salem Football Stadium; Salem, Virginia
Albion | 38
Washington & Jefferson | 15

== See also ==
- 1994 NCAA Division I-A football season
- 1994 NCAA Division I-AA football season
- 1994 NCAA Division II football season
