= Albion Britons football =

- First season: 1884; 142 years ago
- Head coach: Travis Rundle; 3rd season, 17–13 (.567)
- Location: Albion, Michigan
- Stadium: Sprankle-Sprandel Stadium
- NCAA division: Division III
- Conference: MIAA
- Colors: Purple and gold

NCAA Division III championships
- 1994
- Mascot: Britons
- Website: Albion Britons Football

The Albion Britons football team represents Albion College, located in Albion, Michigan, in NCAA Division III college football competition.

The Britons, who began playing football in 1884, have been continuous members of the Michigan Intercollegiate Athletic Association since its foundation in 1888.

Albion's home games are played at Sprankle-Sprandel Stadium.

== History ==
=== Conferences ===
- 1884–1887: Independent
- 1888–present: Michigan Intercollegiate Athletic Association

== Championships ==
=== National championships ===
| Year | Association | Division | Head coach | Record | Opponent | Result |
|---|---|---|---|---|---|---|
| 1994 | NCAA (1) | Division III (1) | Pete Schmidt | 13–0 (5–0 MIAA) | Washington & Jefferson | W, 38–15 |
