= Jim Heath (American football) =

American football and baseball coach (born 1956)

Biographical details
- Born: May 22, 1956 (age 70)

Playing career
- 1974–1977: Kalamazoo

Coaching career (HC unless noted)

Football
- 1985–1987: Kalamazoo

Baseball
- 1985–1986: Kalamazoo

Head coaching record
- Overall: 3–24 (football); 10–41 (baseball)

Jim Heath (born May 22, 1956) is an American former football and baseball coach. He served as the head football coach at Kalamazoo College in Kalamazoo, Michigan for three seasons, from 1985 to 1987, compiling a record of 3–24.

== Head coaching record ==
=== Football ===
| Year | Team | Overall | Conference | Standing | Bowl/playoffs |
|---|---|---|---|---|---|
Kalamazoo Hornets (Michigan Intercollegiate Athletic Association) (1985–1987)
| 1985 | Kalamazoo | 1–8 | 1–4 | 5th | |
| 1986 | Kalamazoo | 1–8 | 1–4 | 5th | |
| 1987 | Kalamazoo | 1–8 | 0–5 | 6th | |
| Kalamazoo: | | 3–24 | 2–13 | | |
| Total: | | 3–24 | | | |
