= Terrance Brooks =

American football player and coach (1963–2011)

Biographical details
- Born: December 12, 1963
- Died: June 13, 2011 (aged 47); Sacramento, California, U.S.

Playing career
- 1981–1984: Towson State
- Position: Guard

Coaching career (HC unless noted)
- 2005–2007: Kalamazoo

Head coaching record
- Overall: 7–21 (college)

Terrance A. Brooks (December 12, 1963 – June 13, 2011) was an American college football coach who was head coach at Kalamazoo College from 2005 to 2007, compiling a record of 7–21.

Brooks was a native of Union Bridge, Maryland. He attended Towson State University—now Towson University—where he started for three years at right guard on the football team. Brooks was also a discus thrower for the Towson Tigers track and field team. Brooks was signed as free agent by the Cleveland Browns of the National Football League, but a knee injury ended his career before he played a professional game.

Brooks began his coaching career at Lansdowne High School in Baltimore County, Maryland, as head football coach. There he also taught physical education and was an assistant coach for the track team. He later served as an assistant football coach and strength and conditioning coordinator at Bridgewater College and Shenandoah University in Virginia. He returned to his alma mater, Towson, in 2008 as a strength and conditioning coach, working with a number of the athletic teams there. A year later, he moved to California State University, Sacramento.

Brooks died on June 13, 2011, during surgery at UC Davis Medical Center in Sacramento, California. He was 47 years old.

== Head coaching record ==
=== College ===
| Year | Team | Overall | Conference | Standing | Bowl/playoffs |
|---|---|---|---|---|---|
Kalamazoo Hornets (Michigan Intercollegiate Athletic Association) (2005–2007)
| 2005 | Kalamazoo | 4–6 | 3–4 | 6th | |
| 2006 | Kalamazoo | 2–7 | 2–5 | T–6th | |
| 2007 | Kalamazoo | 1–8 | 0–7 | 8th | |
| Kalamazoo: | | 7–21 | 5–16 | | |
| Total: | | 7–21 | | | |
