= Paul Staake =

American football coach and college administrator (1898–1971)

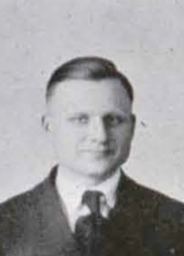

Biographical details
- Born: December 26, 1898; Dorr, Michigan, U.S.
- Died: April 7, 1971 (aged 72); Babson Park, Massachusetts, U.S.

Playing career
- 1919: Kalamazoo
- Position: Halfback

Coaching career (HC unless noted)
- 1918: Kalamazoo

Head coaching record
- Overall: 1–2

Paul Cory Staake (December 26, 1898 – April 7, 1971) was an American football coach and college administrator. He served as the head football coach at Kalamazoo College in Kalamazoo, Michigan for one season, in 1918, compiling a record of 1–2.

Staake also played college football at Kalamazoo. He later served as president of Webber College in Babson Park, Florida.

== Head coaching record ==
Year	Team	Overall	Conference	Standing	Bowl/playoffs
Kalamazoo Baptists (Michigan Intercollegiate Athletic Association) (1918)
1918	Kalamazoo	1–2	1–1	N/A	
Kalamazoo:		1–2	1–1		
Total:		1–2			
