= List of Albion College people =

This is a list of notable alumni and faculty, people who attended and graduated from Albion College in Albion, Michigan, and people who received honorary degrees.

== Alumni ==
=== Academia ===
- Ella H. Brockway Avann, 1871, educator (1853–1899)
- David P. Baker, 1974, sociologist (1952–)
- Robert Bartlett, surgeon (1939–)
- Bob Bemer, 1940, computer scientist (1920–2004)
- Bruce C. Berndt, 1961, mathematician (1939–)
- J Harlen Bretz, 1906, geologist (1882–1981)
- Mark W. Chase, 1973, botanist (1951–)
- Harriet Gertrude Eddy, 1890s, educator and librarian (1876–1966)
- Robert E. Horton, 1897, hydrology (1875–1945)
- Melvin H. Knisely, 1927, anatomist specializing in microcirculation (1904–1975)
- Forest Ray Moulton, 1894, astronomer (1872–1952)
- Dwight B. Waldo, first president of Western Michigan University (1864–1939)
- Charlotte S. Winchell, 1856, civic leader; Albion College faculty (1836-1926)
- Mary Chawner Woody, minister, teacher, and temperance leader (1846–1928)

=== Arts and entertainment ===
- Philip Campbell Curtis, 1930, surrealist-inspired painter (1907–2000)
- Allie Luse Dick, music teacher
- Cornelia Moore Chillson Moots, 1882, missionary, temperance evangelist (1843–1929)
- Jon Scieszka, 1976, children's book author (1954–)
- John Sinclair, poet and '60s counterculture icon (1941–2024)
- F. Dudleigh Vernor, 1914, organist, composer

=== Business ===
- William C. Ferguson, 1952, chairman of NYNEX NKA Verizon Communications (1930–2015)
- Joel Manby, 1981, former CEO of SeaWorld Entertainment
- Geoffery Merszei, CFO of Dow Chemical Company (1951–)
- Martin Nesbitt, 1985, businessman, Barack Obama's friend and campaign treasurer (1962–)
- Doug Parker, 1984, chairman and chief executive officer of American Airlines (1962–)
- Moose Scheib, founder and CEO of LoanMod.com (1980–)
- Richard Mills Smith, 1968, chairman and editor-in-chief, Newsweek (1946–)

=== Government and politics ===
- Florence Riddick Boys, 1896, Indiana suffragist, journalist, state official
- Prentiss M. Brown, 1911, U.S. senator from Michigan
- David L. Camp, 1975, U.S. representative from Michigan
- Barbara Ann Crancer, 1960, Missouri state circuit court judge and daughter of former Teamsters Union president Jimmy Hoffa
- Homer Folks, 1887, pioneer of mental and public health reform in New York
- Bates Gill, Chinese foreign policy expert and director of Stockholm International Peace Research Institute
- Matthew Gillard, politician, member of the Michigan House of Representatives
- George Heartwell, 1971, mayor of Grand Rapids, Michigan
- Matt Heinz, politician, member of Arizona House of Representatives
- Charles Tisdale Howard, 1880, speaker of the South Dakota House of Representatives
- Melvin Hollowell, 1991, chair of the Michigan Democratic Party
- Thomas Ludington, 1976, judge of the United States District Court for the Eastern District of Michigan and Albion College trustee
- Lyle H. Miller, 1914, brigadier general in the Marine Corps
- Carl W. Riddick, member of the U.S. House of Representatives from the Second District of Montana
- Mark Schauer, 1984, U.S. representative from Michigan
- Anna Howard Shaw, attended 1872–1875, civil rights leader, first female Methodist minister in the U.S.
- Robert M. Teeter, 1961, Republican pollster
- Edwin B. Winans, attended in 1840s, U.S. representative and governor of Michigan

=== Other ===
- Josh A. Cassada, 1995, physicist, NASA astronaut
- Cedric Dempsey, 1954, former president of the National Collegiate Athletic Association (NCAA)
- Chris Greenwood, 2012, former National Football League player for Detroit Lions
- Phyllis Harrison-Ross, 1956, psychiatrist working with developmentally disabled and mentally ill children
- Mary Catherine Judd (1852–1937), educator, author, and peace activist
- Mary Beecher Longyear, philanthropist and founder of Longyear Foundation
- J. Fred “Pop” McKale, 1910, former University of Arizona basketball coach; 1998 Albion Hall of Fame inductee
- Forest Ray Moulton, 1894, astronomer
- Will Carl Rufus, 1902, astronomer, mathematician
- Leonard F. "Fritz" Shurmur, 1956, former college and National Football League football coach
- Madelon Stockwell, first woman to graduate from the University of Michigan
- Hazen Graff Werner, 1920, bishop of the United Methodist Church
- Nicolle Zellner, 2007, astronomer, planetary scientist, astrobiologist, professor, public outreach in space science and racial and gender minority recognition in STEM

=== Honorary degrees ===
- Barbara Bush, 2005, former First Lady of the United States

== Faculty ==
- Henrietta Ash Bancroft (1843–1929), professor of English and dean of women (1892–98)

== Presidents of Albion College ==
1. Charles Franklin Stockwell (1843–1845)
2. Clark T. Hinman (1846–1853)
3. Ira Mayhew (1853–1864)
4. Thomas H. Sinex (1854–1864)
5. George Beiners Jocelyn (1864–1869 and 1871–1877), J.L.G. McKown (1869–1870; interim), William B. Silber (1870–1871)
6. Lewis R. Fiske (1877–1898)
7. John Ashley (1898–1901)
8. Samuel F. Dickie (1901–1921)
9. John Wesley Laird (1921–1924)
10. John Lawrence Seaton (1924–1945)
11. William W. Whitehouse (1945–1960)
12. Louis W. Norris (1960–1970)
13. Bernard T. Lomas (1970–1983)
14. Melvin L. Vulgamore (1983–1997), William C. Ferguson (1997; interim)
15. Peter T. Mitchell (1997–2007)
16. Donna M. Randall (2007–2013), Michael L. Frandsen (2013–2014; interim)
17. Mauri A. Ditzler (2014–2020)
18. Mathew B. Johnson (2020–2021), Joe Calvaruso (2021–2023; interim)
19. Wayne P. Webster (2023–present)

== Athletics ==
See List of Albion Britons head football coaches

- Dustin Beurer, 2005, head football coach for Albion
- Morley Fraser, head football coach
- Walter S. Kennedy, head football coach and all-American quarterback at for the University of Chicago Maroons
- Dale R. Sprankle, head football coach at Albion and at Adrian College
