= List of Albion Britons head football coaches =

The Albion Britons football program is a college football team that represents Albion College in the Michigan Intercollegiate Athletic Association, a part of the Division III (NCAA). The team has had 27 head coaches since its first recorded football game in 1883. The current coach is Travis Rundle who took the position for the 2023 season.

== Key ==
Key to symbols in coaches list
General		Overall		Conference		Postseason (Note: Although the first Rose Bowl Game was played in 1902, it has been continuously played since the 1916 game, and is recognized as the oldest bowl game by the NCAA. "—" indicates any season prior to 1916 when postseason games were not played.)	
No.	Order of coaches (Note: A running total of the number of head coaches, with coaches who served separate tenures being counted only once. Interim head coaches are represented with "Int" and are not counted in the running total. "—" indicates the team played but either without a coach or no coach is on record. "X" indicates an interim year without play.)	GC	Games coached	CW	Conference wins	PW	Postseason wins
DC	Division championships	OW	Overall wins	CL	Conference losses	PL	Postseason losses
CC	Conference championships	OL	Overall losses	CT	Conference ties	PT	Postseason ties
NC	National championships	OT	Overall ties (Note: Overtime rules in college football were introduced in 1996, making ties impossible in the period since.)	C%	Conference winning percentage		
†	Elected to the College Football Hall of Fame	O%	Overall winning percentage (Note: When computing the win–loss percentage, a tie counts as half a win and half a loss.)				

== Coaches ==
List of head football coaches showing season(s) coached, overall records, conference records, postseason records, championships and selected awards (Note: Statistics correct as of the end of the 2025 college football season.)
No.	Name	Term	GC	OW	OL	OT	O%	CW	CL	CT	C%	PW	PL	CCs	Awards
1	Durand W. Springer	1884	3	2	1	0	.667	—	—	—	—	—	—	—	—
2	Anson E. Hagle	1885–1886	3	1	2	0	.333	—	—	—	—	—	—	—	—
0	No coach	1887–1892	17	9	8	0	.529	—	—	—	—	—	—	—	—
3	Atwood	1893	4	1	3	0	.250	—	—	—	—	—	—	—	—
4	Walter B. Gage	1894–1895	11	7	3	1	.682	3	1	0	.750	—	—	1	—
5	F. J. Shipp	1896	8	4	4	1	.500	2	1	0	.667	—	—	—	—
6	William A. Niles	1897	8	4	3	1	.563	—	—	—	—	—	—	—	—
7	Carl Jacobs	1898	6	1	5	0	.167	—	—	—	—	—	—	—	—
8	Chester Brewer	1899–1902	39	20	16	3	.563	—	—	—	—	—	—	—	—
9	Julius Nufer	1903	8	3	3	2	.500	3	2	1	.583	—	—	—	—
10	Walter S. Kennedy	1904–1905, 1908–1912, 1915–1920	88	57	23	8	.693	—	—	—	—	—	—	5	—
11	W. D. Chadwick	1906–1907	14	5	8	1	.393	—	—	—	—	—	—	—	—
12	Thomas Andrew Gill	1913	7	3	3	1	.500	3	2	1	.583	—	—	—	—
13	Otto Carpell	1914	7	4	3	0	.571	3	1	0	.750	—	—	1	—
14	Charles M. Guyselman	1918–1919	14	10	4	0	.714	—	—	—	—	—	—	—	—
15	John F. Miller	1921–1923	26	18	6	2	.731	12	2	1	.833	—	—	1	—
16	R. W. Bechtel	1924–1926	27	13	13	2	.519	8	5	1	.607	—	—	—	—
17	Bud Daugherty	1927–1935	68	33	29	6	.529	20	15	5	.563	—	—	1	—
18	Dale R. Sprankle	1936–1946	73	36	33	4	.521	23	14	4	.610	—	—	2	—
19	Dean Rockwell	1947	8	0	8	0	.000	0	5	0	.000	—	—	—	—
20	Del Anderson	1948–1953	50	28	19	3	.590	14	15	2	.484	—	—	1	—
21	Morley Fraser	1954–1968	123	81	41	1	.663	58	22	0	.725	—	—	6	—
22	Tom J. Taylor	1969–1972	35	13	20	2	.400	8	11	1	.425	—	—	1	—
23	Frank Joranko	1973–1982	91	49	39	3	.555	28	19	3	.590	0	1	2	—
24	Pete Schmidt	1983–1996	135	104	27	3	.787	55	11	4	.814	5	4	9	—
25	Craig Rundle	1997–2018	222	127	95	0	.572	87	48	0	.644	0	5	7	—
26	Dustin Beurer	2019–2022	34	29	5	0	.853	18	4	0	.818	0	1	2	—
27	Travis Rundle	2023–present	30	17	13	0	.531	9	11	0	.450	—	—	—	—
