= 1961 Michigan Intercollegiate Athletic Association football season =

- League: Michigan Intercollegiate Athletic Association
- Sport: Football
- Teams: 6
- Champion: Albion

Football seasons

1961 Michigan Intercollegiate Athletic Association football standings
	Conf.					Overall
Team	W		L		T	W		L		T
Albion $	5	–	0	–	0	8	–	0	–	0
Olivet	4	–	1	–	0	8	–	1	–	0
Kalamazoo	3	–	2	–	0	4	–	4	–	0
Alma	2	–	3	–	0	2	–	6	–	0
Adrian	1	–	4	–	0	2	–	6	–	0
Hope	0	–	5	–	0	0	–	7	–	0
$ – Conference champion

The 1961 Michigan Intercollegiate Athletic Association football season was the season of college football played by the six member schools of the Michigan Intercollegiate Athletic Association (MIAA) as part of the 1961 college football season. Albion compiled a perfect 8–0 record and was the MIAA champion for 1961.

== Albion ==
1961 Albion Britons football

MIAA champion
- Conference: Michigan Intercollegiate Athletic Association
- Record: 8–0 (5–0 MIAA)
- Head coach: Morley Fraser (8th season)
- MVP: Joe Shurmur
- Captains: Dale Springer; Ray Hoag
- Home stadium: Alumni Field

The 1961 Albion Britons football team compiled a perfect 8–0 record (5–0 against MIAA members), won the MIAA championship, and outscored opponents by a total of 186 to 56.

Date	Opponent	Site	Result	Attendance	Source
September 16	Eastern Michigan*	Alumni Field; Albion, MI	W 13–0	1,500–4,000	
September 30	Kalamazoo	Alumni Field; Albion, MI	W 15–0	2,000–3,820	
October 7	at Hope	Riverview Park; Holland, MI	W 26–14	4,500–4,850	
October 14	Anderson (IN)*	Alumni Field; Albion, MI	W 35–6	1,100	
October 21	Olivet^{†}	Alumni Field; Albion, MI	W 13–0	6,000	
October 28	at Ferris Institute*	Big Rapids, MI	W 28–6	2,700	
November 4	at Alma	Alma, MI	W 27–12	4,030	
November 11	at Adrian	Adrian, MI	W 35–17	4,285	
*Non-conference game; ^{†}Homecoming

== Olivet ==
1961 Olivet Comets football
- Conference: Michigan Intercollegiate Athletic Association
- Record: 8–1 (4–1 MIAA)
- Head coach: Stuart Parsell (3rd season)

The 1961 Olivet Comets football team represented Olivet College of Olivet, Michigan. In their third year under head coach Stuart Parsell, the Comets compiled an 8–1 record (4–1 against MIAA opponents), finished in second place in the MIAA, and outscored opponents by a total of 163 to 69.

The team tallied 2,470 yards ot total offense (274.4 yards per game), consisting of 1,829 rushing yards and 641 passing yards. Halfback Tim Nesbitt led the team in both rushing (791 yards on 147 carries) and total offense (830 yards). On defense, the Comets held opponents to 1,694 yards (187.8 yards per game)

Date	Opponent	Site	Result	Attendance	Source
September 16	at Franklin*	Franklin, IN	W 27–7	600	
September 23	Indiana Central*	Olivet, MI	W 22–6		
September 30	Adrian	Olivet, MI	W 9–0		
October 7	at Kalamazoo	Kalamazoo, MI	W 13–6		
October 14	Hope	Olivet, MI	W 20–8	1,500	
October 21	at Albion	Albion, MI	L 0–13		
October 28	Illinois College*	Olivet, MI	W 40–20		
November 4	at Ohio Northern*	Ada, OH	W 6–3		
November 11	at Alma	Alma, MI	W 26–6		
*Non-conference game

== Kalamazoo ==
1961 Kalamazoo Hornets football
- Conference: Michigan Intercollegiate Athletic Association
- Record: 4–4 (3–2 MIAA)
- Head coach: Rolla Anderson (9th season)
- Home stadium: Angell Field

The 1961 Kalamazoo Hornets football team represented Kalamazoo College of Kalamazoo, Michigan. Led by head coach Bob Nulf, the Hornets compiled a 4–4 record (3–2 in conference games), finished third in the conference, and outscored opponents by a total of 219 to 81.

The Hornets tallied 2,424 yards of total offense (303.0 yards per game), consisting of 1,282 rushing yards and 1,142 passing yards. On defense, they held opponents to 2,134 yards (266.8 yards per game.

Quarterback Jim Harkema completed 39 of 74 passes for 590 yards with five touchdown passes and nine interceptions. He also led the team with 590 yards of total offense. (Harkema later won 109 games as a head coach.) The team's other statistical leaders included halfback Norm Young with 342 rushing yards, fullback Eglis Lode with 30 points scored, and end John Persons with 25 receptions for 401 yards.

Date	Opponent	Site	Result	Attendance	Source
September 23	at Ohio Wesleyan*	Delaware, OH	L 6–32	2,500	
September 30	at Albion	Albion, MI	L 0–14	2,000	
October 7	Olivet	Angell Field; Kalamazoo, MI	L 6–13	1,700	
October 14	at Carthage*	Carthage, IL	L 6–33	2,300	
October 21	Alma	Angell Field; Kalamazoo, MI	W 30–24	1,200	
October 28	at Adrian	Adrian, MI	W 26–7	2,000	
November 4	Hiram*	Angell Field; Kalamazoo, MI	W 28–6	2,100	
November 11	Hope	Angell Field; Kalamazoo, MI	W 42–12	1,000	
*Non-conference game

== Alma ==
1961 Alma Scots football
- Conference: Michigan Intercollegiate Athletic Association
- Record: 2–6 (2–3 MIAA)
- Head coach: Art Smith (6th season)

The 1961 Alma Scots football team represented Alma College of Alma, Michigan. In their sixth year under head coach Art Smith, the Scots compiled a 2–6 record (2–3 against MIAA opponents), finished in fourth place in the MIAA, and were outscored by a total of 159 to 71.

The team tallied 1,081 yards of total offense (134 yards per game), consisting of 444 rushing yards and 637 passing yards. On defense, Alma allowed opponents to 2,078 yards (260 per game).

The team's individual statistical leaders included halfback Lou Economon with 187 rushing yards and 140 receiving yards, quarterback Terry Ebright with 444 passing yards, and halfback Van Mulligan with 14 points scored.

Date	Opponent	Site	Result	Attendance	Source
September 16	Ohio Northern*	Alma, MI	L 7–8	500	
September 23	at Bluffton*	Bluffton, OH	L 0–14	2,000	
September 30	Wittenberg*	Alma, MI	L 0–43	1,500	
October 14	Adrian	Alma, MI	W 8–7	6,500	
October 21	at Kalamazoo	Kalamazoo, MI	L 24–30	2,500	
October 28	Hope	Alma, MI	W 14–10	1,500	
November 4	at Albion	Albion, MI	L 12–21	3,000	
November 11	Olivet	Alma, MI	L 6–26	2,000	
*Non-conference game

== Adrian ==
1961 Adrian Bulldogs football
- Conference: Michigan Intercollegiate Athletic Association
- Record: 2–6 (1–4 MIAA)
- Head coach: Les Leggett (3rd season)

The 1961 Adrian Bulldogs football team represented Adrian College of Adrian, Michigan. In their third and final year under head coach Les Leggett, the Bulldogs compiled a 2–6 record (1–4 against MIAA opponents) and finished in fifth place in the MIAA.

Date	Opponent	Site	Result	Attendance	Source
September 16	at Findlay*	Findlay, OH	L 8–20		
September 23	Defiance*	Adrian, MI	W 7–0		
September 30	at Olivet	Olivet, MI	L 0–9		
October 14	at Alma	Alma, MI	L 7–8		
October 21	at Ferris Institute*	Big Rapids, MI	L 0–24		
October 28	Kalamazoo	Adrian, MI	L 7–26		
November 4	at Hope	Holland, MI	W 25–14		
November 11	Albion	Adrian, MI	L 17–35		
*Non-conference game

== Hope ==
1961 Hope Flying Dutchmen football
- Conference: Michigan Intercollegiate Athletic Association
- Record: 0–7 (0–5 MIAA)
- Head coach: Russ DeVette (7th season)

The 1961 Hope Flying Dutchmen football team represented Hope College of Hope, Michigan. In their seventh year under head coach Russ DeVette, the Dutchmen compiled a 0–7 record (0–5 against MIAA opponents) and finished in last place in the MIAA.

Date	Opponent	Site	Result	Attendance	Source
September 23	at Valparaiso*	Boucher Bowl; Valparaiso, IN	L 6–14		
September 30	Wheaton (IL)*	Riverview Park; Holland, MI	L 0–20	2,500	
October 7	Albion	Riverview Park; Holland, MI	L 14–26	4,500–4,850	
October 14	vs. Olivet	Charlotte, MI	L 8–20	1,500	
October 28	at Alma	Alma, MI	L 0–14	1,500	
November 4	Adrian	Holland, MI	L 14–25		
November 11	at Kalamazoo	Kalamazoo, MI	L 12–42	1,000	
*Non-conference game
