= Henry Fraser =

Henry Fraser may refer to:

- Henry Paterson Fraser (1907–2001), British senior commander of Royal Air Force
- Henry Morley Fraser (1922–2004), American football and baseball coach

== See also ==
- Harry Fraser (disambiguation)
- Henry Frazer (disambiguation)
