= Charles Marvin (coach) =

American football and baseball coach (1929–2026)

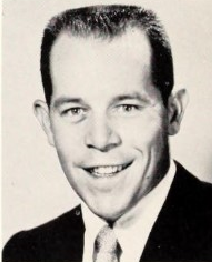

Biographical details
- Born: January 27, 1929
- Died: June 5, 2026 (aged 97); Petoskey, Michigan, U.S.

Coaching career (HC unless noted)

Football
- late 1940s: Battle Creek Central HS (MI) (assistant)
- 1954–1959: Washington-Lee High School (coach 1954-1957)
- 1959–1961: Adrian HS (MI)
- 1962–1967: Adrian

Baseball
- 1954–1959: Washington-Lee High School (coach)
- 1965–1968: Adrian

Head coaching record
- Overall: 14–33 (college football); 33–46–1 (college baseball)

Charles Edward "Chappy" Marvin (January 27, 1929 – June 5, 2026) was an American football and baseball coach. He graduated from Adrian College before beginning his coaching career in the late 1940s as an assistant to Bob Waldorf at Battle Creek Central High School in Battle Creek, Michigan. From 1954 to 1959 Marvin taught Health and Physical Education at Washington-Lee High School in Arlington, Virginia, coaching Senior Football and J.V. Baseball. Marvin served as head football coach from 1958 to the end of 1959 after winning Virginia State Championship in the 1957 season. In 1955, during Warren Beatty's senior year at Washington-Lee High School, Marvin served as his varsity football coach.

Marvin left Washington-Lee at the end of the 1959 year and served as head football coach at Adrian High School before he was hired to replace Les Leggett as head football coach at Adrian College. Marvin served as the head football coach at Adrian College in Adrian, Michigan for six seasons, from 1962 to 1967, compiling a record of 14–33.

He resigned from Adrian College at the end of the 1967 season.

Marvin married Carol Jane Wear on July 26, 1952, at First United Methodist Church in Evanston, Illinois. The couple celebrated their 70th wedding anniversary in July 2022.

Marvin died on June 5, 2026, at the age of 97.

== Head coaching record ==
=== College football ===
Year	Team	Overall	Conference	Standing	Bowl/playoffs
Adrian Bulldogs (Michigan Intercollegiate Athletic Association) (1962–1967)
1962	Adrian	3–4	3–2	T–2nd	
1963	Adrian	4–4	3–2	T–3rd	
1964	Adrian	2–6	1–4	T–4th	
1965	Adrian	1–7	1–4	5th	
1966	Adrian	3–5	1–4	6th	
1967	Adrian	1–7	1–4	T–5th	
Adrian:		14–33	10–20		
Total:		14–33			
