= Albion Britons football, 1960–1969 =

American college football seasons

1960–1969 Albion Britons football
- Conference: Michigan Intercollegiate Athletic Association
- Head coach: Morley Fraser (1954–1968); Tom J. Taylor (1969–1972)

The Albion Britons football program, 2020–present represented Albion College from 2020 to the present in NCAA Division II college football as a member of the Michigan Intercollegiate Athletic Association (MIAA). The program won six MIAA championship during the decade: 1960, 1961, 1964, 1965, 1966, and 1969. The team was led by head coaches Morley Fraser (1954–1968) and Tom J. Taylor (1969–1972).

== 1960 ==
1960 Albion Britons football

MIAA champion
- Conference: Michigan Intercollegiate Athletic Association
- Record: 7–1 (5–0 MIAA)
- Head coach: Morley Fraser (7th season)
- Home stadium: Alumni Field

1960 Michigan Intercollegiate Athletic Association football standings
	Conf.					Overall
Team	W		L		T	W		L		T
Albion $	5	–	0	–	0	7	–	1	–	0
Hope	4	–	1	–	0	5	–	4	–	0
Adrian	3	–	2	–	0	4	–	3	–	1
Kalamazoo	2	–	3	–	0	4	–	5	–	0
Olivet	1	–	4	–	0	3	–	5	–	0
Alma	0	–	5	–	0	2	–	7	–	0
$ – Conference champion

The 1960 Albion Britons football team was an American football team that represented Albion College of Albion, Michigan, as a member of the Michigan Intercollegiate Athletic Association (MIAA) during the 1960 college football season. In their seventh season under head coach Morley Fraser, the Britons compiled a 7–1 record (5–0 in MIAA games) and won the MIAA championship.

== 1961 ==
1961 Albion Britons football

MIAA champion
- Conference: Michigan Intercollegiate Athletic Association
- Record: 8–0 (5–0 MIAA)
- Head coach: Morley Fraser (8th season)
- MVP: Joe Shurmur
- Captains: Dale Springer; Ray Hoag
- Home stadium: Alumni Field

1961 Michigan Intercollegiate Athletic Association football standings
	Conf.					Overall
Team	W		L		T	W		L		T
Albion $	5	–	0	–	0	8	–	0	–	0
Olivet	4	–	1	–	0	8	–	1	–	0
Kalamazoo	3	–	2	–	0	4	–	4	–	0
Alma	2	–	3	–	0	2	–	6	–	0
Adrian	1	–	4	–	0	2	–	6	–	0
Hope	0	–	5	–	0	0	–	7	–	0
$ – Conference champion

The 1961 Albion Britons football team was an American football team that represented Albion College of Albion, Michigan, as a member of the Michigan Intercollegiate Athletic Association (MIAA) during the 1961 college football season. In their eighth season under head coach Morley Fraser, the Britons compiled a perfect 8–0 record (5–0 against MIAA members), won the MIAA championship, and outscored opponents by a total of 186 to 56. It was Albion's first perfect season since 1928.

The team was inducted into Albion's Athletic Hall of Fame in 1991. Nine coaches or players from the team have also been inducted as individuals: Morley Fraser; Darwin Christiansen; Frank Gould; Ray Hag; Ken Neal; Robert Porritt; Fritz Shurmur; Joe Shurmur; and Dale Springer.

The team's individual statistical leaders included fullback J.B. Elzy with 752 rushing yards, quarterback Frank Gould with 604 passing yards and 818 yards of total offense, and end Gary Methner with 49 pass receptions for 604 yards.

Junior Joe Shurmur was named to the 1961 MIAA all-conference team on both offense (guard) and defense (linebacker); he was also voted as the team's most valuable player. Albion took nine of the 22 spots on the 1961 all-conference team. In addition to Shurmur, Albion's other honorees were quarterback Frank Gould; running backs J.B. Elzy and Ray Hoag; end Gary Menther; defensive tackle Terry Menther; defensive guard Milt Moore; and defensive halfback Bob Porritt.

The team played its home games at Alumni Field in Albion, Michigan.

=== Schedule ===
Date	Opponent	Site	Result	Attendance	Source
September 16	Eastern Michigan*	Alumni Field; Albion, MI	W 13–0	1,500–4,000	
September 30	Kalamazoo	Alumni Field; Albion, MI	W 15–0	2,000–3,820	
October 7	at Hope	Riverview Park; Holland, MI	W 26–14	4,500–4,850	
October 14	Anderson (IN)*	Alumni Field; Albion, MI	W 35–6	1,100	
October 21	Olivet^{†}	Alumni Field; Albion, MI	W 13–0	6,000	
October 28	at Ferris Institute*	Big Rapids, MI	W 28–6	2,700	
November 4	at Alma	Alma, MI	W 27–12	4,030	
November 11	at Adrian	Adrian, MI	W 35–17	4,285	
*Non-conference game; ^{†}Homecoming

=== Roster ===
The following 37 players received block "A" varsity letters for their participation on the 1961 Albion football team:

1. Dom Adamson - junior, Grand Rapids, Michigan
2. Dave Barrett - sophomore, Grand Rapids, Michigan
3. Bruce Blakeman - junior, Paw Paw, Michigan
4. Jesse Bommarito - sophomore, Albion, Michigan
5. Jerry Chandler - freshman, Dearborn, Michigan
6. Dar Christiansen - junior, Flushing, Michigan
7. Monte Clute - senior, Rochester, Michigan
8. Dick Dana - freshman, Williamston, Michigan
9. Roger Dunn - sophomore, Flint, Michigan
10. Keith Galloway - freshman, Grosse Ile, Michigan
11. Frank Gould - junior, St. Charles, Michigan
12. George Eisener - junior, Jonesville, Michigan
13. J.B. Elzy - sophomore, Flint, Michigan
14. Bob Gardner - freshman, Wayne, Michigan
15. Ray Hoag - senior, Lowell, Michigan
16. Mike Hornus - sophomore, Owosso, Michigan
17. Les Knickerbacker - sophomore, Flint, Michigan
18. Jim Livingston - freshman, Flint, Michigan
19. Tom Lutz - junior, Wyandotte, Michigan
20. Jim Madill - junior, Midland, Michigan
21. Bruce Martens - junior, Vicksburg, Michigan
22. Gary Methner - senior, Midland, Michigan
23. Terry Methner - sophomore, Midland, Michigan
24. Milton Moore - senior, Chicago
25. Ken Neal - freshman, Sault Ste. Marie, Michigan
26. Jim Osgood - sophomore, Mount Pleasant, Michigan
27. Bob Porritt - sophomore, Clarkston, Michigan
28. Steve Richards - sophomore, South Lake, Michigan
29. Mike Shafer - freshman, Findlay, Ohio
30. Bob Smith - senior, Grosse Ile, Michigan
31. Jon Rise - senior, Pontiac, Michigan
32. Tom Sagendorf - senior, Grand Rapids, Michigan
33. Joe Shurmur - junior, Wyandotte, Michigan
34. Dale Springer - senior, co-captain, Lansing, Michigan
35. John Ulmanis - freshman, Midland, Michigan
36. Russ Wallis - freshman, Durand, Michigan
37. Phil Willis - junior, Grass Lake, Michigan

Varsity letters were also presented to team managers Fred Clawson, John Gorton, and Richard Yeager.

== 1962 ==
1962 Albion Britons football
- Conference: Michigan Intercollegiate Athletic Association
- Record: 6–2 (3–2 MIAA)
- Head coach: Morley Fraser (9th season)

1962 Michigan Intercollegiate Athletic Association football standings
	Conf.					Overall
Team	W		L		T	W		L		T
Kalamazoo $	5	–	0	–	0	8	–	0	–	0
Albion	3	–	2	–	0	6	–	2	–	0
Olivet	3	–	2	–	0	6	–	3	–	0
Adrian	3	–	2	–	0	3	–	4	–	0
Hope	1	–	4	–	0	3	–	6	–	0
Alma	0	–	5	–	0	0	–	8	–	0
$ – Conference champion

The 1962 Albion Britons football team represented Albion College of Albion, Michigan. In their ninth year under head coach Morley Fraser, the Britons compiled a 6–2 record (3–2 against MIAA opponents), finished in a tie for second place in the MIAA, and outscored opponents by a total of 172 to 83.

The Britons had a 15-game winning streak dating back to the 1960 season. It was the longest winning streak in Albion school history, eclipsing a 14-game streak during the 1939 and 1940 seasons. The streak was broken on October 20 in a loss to Kalamazoo.

Key players included halfbacks Mike Hornus and Russ Wallis and quarterback Frank Gould.

=== Schedule ===
Date	Opponent	Site	Result	Attendance	Source
September 22	Ohio Northern*	Albion, MI	W 16–8		
September 29	Adrian	Albion, MI	W 19–7	4,000	
October 6	at Alma	Alma, MI	W 28–6		
October 13	at Anderson	Anderson, IN	W 34–0		
October 20	at Kalamazoo	Angell Field; Kalamazoo, MI	L 12–19	1,500	
October 27	Wayne State^{†}*	Albion, MI	W 30–6	4,500	
November 3	at Olivet	Olivet, MI	L 7–15	1,500	
November 10	Hope	Albion, MI	W 26–22	1,500	
*Non-conference game; ^{†}Homecoming

== 1963 ==
1963 Albion Britons football
- Conference: Michigan Intercollegiate Athletic Association
- Record: 5–4 (3–2 MIAA)
- Head coach: Morley Fraser (10th season)
- Home stadium: Alumni Field

1963 Michigan Intercollegiate Athletic Association football standings
	Conf.					Overall
Team	W		L		T	W		L		T
Kalamazoo +	4	–	1	–	0	6	–	2	–	0
Hope +	4	–	1	–	0	5	–	4	–	0
Albion	3	–	2	–	0	5	–	4	–	0
Adrian	3	–	2	–	0	4	–	4	–	0
Alma	1	–	4	–	0	2	–	7	–	0
Olivet	0	–	5	–	0	1	–	8	–	0
+ – Conference co-champions; Albion forfeited a win over Adrian.

The 1963 Albion Britons football team was an American football team that represented Albion College of Albion, Michigan, as a member of the Michigan Intercollegiate Athletic Association (MIAA) during the 1963 NCAA College Division football season. In their tenth season under head coach Morley Fraser, the Britons compiled a 5–4 record (3–2 in MIAA games), tied for third place in the MIAA, and outscored oppponents by a total of 133 to 97.

The team's statistical leader included Dave Neilson (949 passing yards) and J. B. Elzy (773 rushing yards).

== 1964 ==
1964 Albion Britons football

MIAA champion
- Conference: Michigan Intercollegiate Athletic Association
- Record: 8–0 (5–0 MIAA)
- Head coach: Morley Fraser (11th season)
- Home stadium: Alumni Field

1964 Michigan Intercollegiate Athletic Association football standings
	Conf.					Overall
Team	W		L		T	W		L		T
Albion $	5	–	0	–	0	8	–	0	–	0
Olivet	4	–	1	–	0	6	–	3	–	0
Kalamazoo	3	–	2	–	0	5	–	3	–	0
Adrian	1	–	4	–	0	2	–	6	–	0
Alma	1	–	4	–	0	2	–	6	–	0
Hope	1	–	4	–	0	2	–	6	–	0
$ – Conference champion

The 1964 Albion Britons football team was an American football team that represented Albion College as a member of the Michigan Intercollegiate Athletic Association (MIAA) during the 1964 NCAA College Division football season. In their 11th season under head coach Morley Fraser, the Britons compiled a perfect 8–0 record (5–0 against MIAA members), won the MIAA championship, and outscored opponents by a total of 226 to 41. It was the third unbeaten season in the history of Albion's football program, with prior unbeaten seasons in 1928 and 1961.

The team's statistical leaders included quarterback Dave Neilson who completed 37 of 84 passes for 736 yards and 14 touchdowns; left halfback Russ Wallis with 165 carries for 779 rushing yards and 58 points scored; and end John Ellinger with 20 receptions for 465 yards and seven touchdowns.

Albion claimed 10 of 23 spots on the 1964 MIAA all-league football team. The Albion honorees were: quarterback Dave Neilson (MIAA passing leader); running back Russ Wallis (MIAA rushing leader); end John Ellinger (MIAA receiving leader); center John Madill; offensive tackle Ron Springer; defensive end Barry Siler; defensive linemen Terry Methner and Mike Shafer; linebacker John Mullin; and defensive back Chick Scarletta.

The team played its home games at Alumni Field in Albion, Michigan.

=== Schedule ===
Date	Opponent	Site	Result	Attendance	Source
September 19	at Wheaton (IL)	Wheaton, IL	W 12–7	5,200	
September 26	Ferris State*	Alumni Field; Albion, MI	W 21–7	3,500	
October 3	at Adrian	Adrian, MI	W 36–0	6,715	
October 10	Kalamazoo	Alumni Field; Albion, MI	W 24–0	2,500–4,418	
October 17	Olivet^{†}	Alumni Field; Albion, MI	W 35–14	6,180	
October 24	at Hope	Holland, MI	W 27–6	6,100	
October 31	Alma	Albion, MI	W 59–0	4,805	
November 7	at West Virginia Wesleyan*	Buckhannon, WV	W 12–7	3,500	
*Non-conference game; ^{†}Homecoming

== 1965 ==
1965 Albion Britons football

MIAA champion
- Conference: Michigan Intercollegiate Athletic Association
- Record: 7–2 (5–0 MIAA)
- Head coach: Morley Fraser (12th season)
- Home stadium: Alumni Field

1965 Michigan Intercollegiate Athletic Association football standings
	Conf.					Overall
Team	W		L		T	W		L		T
Albion $	5	–	0	–	0	7	–	2	–	0
Kalamazoo	3	–	2	–	0	5	–	3	–	0
Hope	3	–	2	–	0	4	–	4	–	0
Olivet	2	–	3	–	0	3	–	6	–	0
Alma	1	–	4	–	0	3	–	5	–	0
Adrian	1	–	4	–	0	1	–	7	–	0
$ – Conference champion

The 1965 Albion Britons football team was an American football team that represented Albion College as a member of the Michigan Intercollegiate Athletic Association (MIAA) during the 1965 NCAA College Division football season. In their 12th season under head coach Morley Fraser, the Britons compiled a 7–2 record (5–0 in MIAA games) and won the MIAA championship.

== 1966 ==
1966 Albion Britons football

MIAA champion
- Conference: Michigan Intercollegiate Athletic Association
- Record: 7–2 (4–1 MIAA)
- Head coach: Morley Fraser (13th season)
- Home stadium: Alumni Field

1966 Michigan Intercollegiate Athletic Association football standings
	Conf.					Overall
Team	W		L		T	W		L		T
Albion $	4	–	1	–	0	7	–	2	–	0
Olivet	3	–	2	–	0	5	–	3	–	0
Alma	3	–	2	–	0	5	–	4	–	0
Hope	2	–	3	–	0	3	–	4	–	0
Kalamazoo	2	–	3	–	0	3	–	5	–	0
Adrian	1	–	4	–	0	3	–	5	–	0
$ – Conference champion

The 1966 Albion Britons football team was an American football team that represented Albion College as a member of the Michigan Intercollegiate Athletic Association (MIAA) during the 1966 NCAA College Division football season. In their 13th season under head coach Morley Fraser, the Britons compiled a 7–2 record (4–1 in MIAA games) and won the MIAA championship.

== 1967 ==
1967 Albion Britons football
- Conference: Michigan Intercollegiate Athletic Association
- Record: 2–5–1 (2–2 MIAA)
- Head coach: Morley Fraser (14th season)

1967 Michigan Intercollegiate Athletic Association football standings
	Conf.					Overall
Team	W		L		T	W		L		T
No. 20 Alma $	5	–	0	–	0	8	–	0	–	0
Olivet	4	–	1	–	0	8	–	1	–	0
Albion	2	–	2	–	0	2	–	5	–	1
Hope	1	–	3	–	0	2	–	6	–	0
Kalamazoo	1	–	4	–	0	2	–	6	–	0
Adrian	1	–	4	–	0	1	–	7	–	0
$ – Conference champion; Rankings from NAIA poll

The 1967 Albion Britons football team was an American football team that represented Albion College as a member of the Michigan Intercollegiate Athletic Association (MIAA) during the 1967 NCAA College Division football season. In their 14th season under head coach Morley Fraser, the Britons compiled a 2–5–1 record (2–2 in MIAA games) and finished in third place in the MIAA.

== 1968 ==
1968 Albion Britons football
- Conference: Michigan Intercollegiate Athletic Association
- Record: 6–3 (4–1 MIAA)
- Head coach: Morley Fraser (15th season)

1968 Michigan Intercollegiate Athletic Association football standings
	Conf.					Overall
Team	W		L		T	W		L		T
No. 12 Alma $	5	–	0	–	0	8	–	0	–	0
Albion	4	–	1	–	0	6	–	3	–	0
Hope	2	–	3	–	0	4	–	5	–	0
Olivet	2	–	3	–	0	3	–	5	–	0
Kalamazoo	1	–	4	–	0	2	–	6	–	0
Adrian	1	–	4	–	0	1	–	7	–	0
$ – Conference champion; Rankings from NAIA poll

The 1968 Albion Britons football team was an American football team that represented Albion College as a member of the Michigan Intercollegiate Athletic Association (MIAA) during the 1968 NCAA College Division football season. In their 15th and final season under head coach Morley Fraser, the Britons compiled a 6–3 record (4–1 in MIAA games) and finished in second place in the MIAA.

== 1969 ==
1969 Albion Britons football

MIAA champion
- Conference: Michigan Intercollegiate Athletic Association
- Record: 8–0 (5–0 MIAA)
- Head coach: Tom J. Taylor (1st season)
- Home stadium: Winter-Lau Field

1969 Michigan Intercollegiate Athletic Association football standings
	Conf.					Overall
Team	W		L		T	W		L		T
Albion $	5	–	0	–	0	8	–	0	–	0
Alma	4	–	1	–	0	6	–	3	–	0
Kalamazoo	3	–	2	–	0	4	–	4	–	0
Hope	2	–	3	–	0	3	–	5	–	1
Olivet	1	–	4	–	0	1	–	8	–	0
Adrian	0	–	5	–	0	3	–	6	–	0
$ – Conference champion

The 1969 Albion Britons football team was an American football team that represented Albion College as a member of the Michigan Intercollegiate Athletic Association (MIAA) during the 1969 NCAA College Division football season. In their first season under head coach Tom J. Taylor, the Britons compiled a perfect 8–0 record (5–0 against MIAA members), won the MIAA championship, and outscored opponents by a total of 177 to 68. It was the fourth unbeaten season in the history of Albion's football program, with prior unbeaten seasons in 1928, 1961, and 1964.

Seven Albion players were included on the 1969 MIAA all-league team: backs Jim Bell and Craig Cossey; center Warren Thompson; guard Al Kastl; defensive lineman Pete Dolan; linebacker Tim Rod; and defensive back Jim McMillan. Quarterback Chris Rundle received honorable mention.

The team played its home games at Winter-Lau Field in Albion, Michigan.

=== Schedule ===
Date	Opponent	Site	Result	Attendance	Source
September 20	at DePauw*	Greencastle, IN	W 32–19	3,023	
September 27	at Wooster*	Wooster, OH	W 13–9	2,000–3,000	
October 4	Wabash*	Winter-Lau Field; Albion, MI	W 22–17	2,000–3,000	
October 11	Kalamazoo	Winter-Lau Field; Albion, MI	W 28–3	4,000	
October 18	at Alma	Bahlke Field; Alma, MI	W 7–3	5,500	
October 25	Hope	Winter-Lau Field; Albion, MI	W 10–8	1,500–2,500	
November 1	Olivet	Winter-Lau Field; Albion, MI	W 35–3	1,514–3,000	
November 8	at Adrian	Adrian, MI	W 30–6	2,300–2,500	
*Non-conference game
