= Hope Flying Dutchmen football, 1960–1969 =

American college football seasons

1960–1969 Hope Flying Dutchmen football
- Conference: Michigan Intercollegiate Athletic Association
- Head coach: Russ DeVette (1955–1969)
- Home stadium: Riverview Park

The Hope Flying Tigers football program, 1960–1969 represented Hope College during the 1960s in NCAA College Division college football as a member of the Michigan Intercollegiate Athletic Association (MIAA). The team was led by head coach Russ DeVette who held the position from 1955 to 1969. The Hope football teams played their home games during the decade at Riverview Park in Holland, Michigan.

== 1960 ==
1960 Hope Flying Dutchmen football
- Conference: Michigan Intercollegiate Athletic Association
- Record: 5–4 (4–1 MIAA)
- Head coach: Russ DeVette (6th season)
- Home stadium: Riverview Park

1960 Michigan Intercollegiate Athletic Association football standings
	Conf.					Overall
Team	W		L		T	W		L		T
Albion $	5	–	0	–	0	7	–	1	–	0
Hope	4	–	1	–	0	5	–	4	–	0
Adrian	3	–	2	–	0	4	–	3	–	1
Kalamazoo	2	–	3	–	0	4	–	5	–	0
Olivet	1	–	4	–	0	3	–	5	–	0
Alma	0	–	5	–	0	2	–	7	–	0
$ – Conference champion

The 1960 Hope Flying Dutchmen football team represented Hope College during the 1961 college football season. In their sixth year under head coach Russ DeVette, the Dutchmen compiled a 5–4 record (4–1 against MIAA opponents) and finished in second place in the MIAA.

The team played its home games at Riverview Park in Holland, Michigan.

=== Schedule ===
Date	Opponent	Site	Result	Attendance	Source
September 17	DePauw	Riverview Park; Holland, MI	W 21–10		
September 24	at Ohio Northern*	Lima, OH	L 7–15		
October 1	at Albion	Albion, MI	L 12–14		
October 8	Alma	Riverview Park; Holland, MI	W 27–7	3,000	
October 15	at No. 9 Muskingum*	New Concord, OH	L 0–47		
October 22	at Kalamazoo	Angell Field; Kalamazoo, MI	W 26–14		
October 29	Adrian	Riverview Park; Holland, MI	W 20–0	2,500	
November 5	at Hillsdale	Hillsdale, MI	L 27–48	4,500	
November 12	Olivet	Riverview Park; Holland, MI	W 49–0		
*Non-conference game; Rankings from Coaches' Poll released prior to the game

== 1961 ==
1961 Hope Flying Dutchmen football
- Conference: Michigan Intercollegiate Athletic Association
- Record: 0–7 (0–5 MIAA)
- Head coach: Russ DeVette (7th season)
- Home stadium: Riverview Park

1961 Michigan Intercollegiate Athletic Association football standings
	Conf.					Overall
Team	W		L		T	W		L		T
Albion $	5	–	0	–	0	8	–	0	–	0
Olivet	4	–	1	–	0	8	–	1	–	0
Kalamazoo	3	–	2	–	0	4	–	4	–	0
Alma	2	–	3	–	0	2	–	6	–	0
Adrian	1	–	4	–	0	2	–	6	–	0
Hope	0	–	5	–	0	0	–	7	–	0
$ – Conference champion

The 1961 Hope Flying Dutchmen football team represented Hope College during the 1961 college football season. In their seventh year under head coach Russ DeVette, the Dutchmen compiled a 0–7 record (0–5 against MIAA opponents) and finished in last place in the MIAA.

=== Schedule ===
Date	Opponent	Site	Result	Attendance	Source
September 23	at Valparaiso*	Boucher Bowl; Valparaiso, IN	L 6–14		
September 30	Wheaton (IL)*	Riverview Park; Holland, MI	L 0–20	2,500	
October 7	Albion	Riverview Park; Holland, MI	L 14–26	4,500–4,850	
October 14	vs. Olivet	Charlotte, MI	L 8–20	1,500	
October 28	at Alma	Alma, MI	L 0–14	1,500	
November 4	Adrian	Holland, MI	L 14–25		
November 11	at Kalamazoo	Kalamazoo, MI	L 12–42	1,000	
*Non-conference game

== 1962 ==
1962 Hope Flying Dutchmen football
- Conference: Michigan Intercollegiate Athletic Association
- Record: 3–6 (3–2 MIAA)
- Head coach: Russ DeVette (8th season)
- Home stadium: Riverview Park

1962 Michigan Intercollegiate Athletic Association football standings
	Conf.					Overall
Team	W		L		T	W		L		T
Kalamazoo $	5	–	0	–	0	8	–	0	–	0
Albion	3	–	2	–	0	6	–	2	–	0
Olivet	3	–	2	–	0	6	–	3	–	0
Adrian	3	–	2	–	0	3	–	4	–	0
Hope	1	–	4	–	0	3	–	6	–	0
Alma	0	–	5	–	0	0	–	8	–	0
$ – Conference champion

The 1962 Hope Flying Dutchmen football team represented Hope College during the 1962 NCAA College Division football season. In their eighth year under head coach Russ DeVette, the Dutchmen compiled a 3–6 record (3–2 against MIAA opponents), finished in fifth place in the MIAA, and were outscored by a total of 215 to 155.

=== Schedule ===
Date	Opponent	Site	Result	Attendance	Source
September 15	Ashland*	Riverview Park; Holland, MI	W 21–14	2,000	
September 22	Valparaiso*	Riverview Park; Holland, MI	L 0–48	4,500	
September 29	at Wheaton*	McCully Field; Wheaton, IL	L 0–31	5,500	
October 6	at Kalamazoo	Kalamazoo, MI	L 22–41	1,500	
October 13	Olivet	Riverview Park; Holland, MI	L 12–19	4,500	
October 20	at Eastern Illinois*	Lincoln Field; Charleston, IL	W 26–7	5,000	
October 27	at Adrian	Maple Stadium; Adrian, MI	L 22–23	2,000	
November 3	Alma	Riverview Park; Holland, MI	W 30–6	2,000	
November 10	at Albion	Albion, MI	L 22–26	1,500	
*Non-conference game

== 1963 ==
1963 Hope Flying Dutchmen football

MIAA co-champion
- Conference: Michigan Intercollegiate Athletic Association
- Record: 5–4 (4–1 MIAA)
- Head coach: Russ DeVette (9th season)
- Home stadium: Riverview Park

1963 Michigan Intercollegiate Athletic Association football standings
	Conf.					Overall
Team	W		L		T	W		L		T
Kalamazoo +	4	–	1	–	0	6	–	2	–	0
Hope +	4	–	1	–	0	5	–	4	–	0
Albion	3	–	2	–	0	5	–	4	–	0
Adrian	3	–	2	–	0	4	–	4	–	0
Alma	1	–	4	–	0	2	–	7	–	0
Olivet	0	–	5	–	0	1	–	8	–	0
+ – Conference co-champions; Albion forfeited a win over Adrian.

The 1963 Hope Flying Dutchmen football team represented Hope College during the 1963 NCAA College Division football season. In their ninth year under head coach Russ DeVette, the Flying Dutchmen compiled a 5–4 record (4–1 in MIAA games) and tied with Kalamazoo for the MIAA championship.

=== Schedule ===
Date	Opponent	Site	Result	Attendance	Source
September 14	at Ashland*	Ashland community stadium; Ashland, OH	L 0–24	3,000	
September 21	at Findlay*	Findlay, OH	L 33–14		
September 28	Wheaton*	Riverview Park; Holland, MI	L 15–19		
October 5	Kalamazoo	Riverview Park; Holland, MI	L 14–21		
October 12	at Alma	Bahlke Field; Alma, MI	W 21–8		
October 19	Adrian	Riverview Park; Holland, MI	W 16–12		
October 26	at Albion	Albion, MI	W 21–6		
November 2	at Olivet	Olivet, MI	W 49–20		
November 9	Eastern Illinois*	Riverview Park; Holland, MI	W 15–6	2,800	
*Non-conference game

== 1964 ==
1964 Hope Flying Dutchmen football
- Conference: Michigan Intercollegiate Athletic Association
- Record: 2–6 (1–4 MIAA)
- Head coach: Russ DeVette (10th season)

1964 Michigan Intercollegiate Athletic Association football standings
	Conf.					Overall
Team	W		L		T	W		L		T
Albion $	5	–	0	–	0	8	–	0	–	0
Olivet	4	–	1	–	0	6	–	3	–	0
Kalamazoo	3	–	2	–	0	5	–	3	–	0
Adrian	1	–	4	–	0	2	–	6	–	0
Alma	1	–	4	–	0	2	–	6	–	0
Hope	1	–	4	–	0	2	–	6	–	0
$ – Conference champion

The 1964 Hope Flying Dutchmen football team represented Hope College during the 1964 NCAA College Division football season. In their tenth year under head coach Russ DeVette, the Flying Dutchmen compiled a 2–6 record (1–4 in MIAA games) and finished in a three-way tie with Adrian and Alma for last place in the MIAA.

== 1965 ==
1965 Hope Flying Dutchmen football
- Conference: Michigan Intercollegiate Athletic Association
- Record: 4–4 (3–2 MIAA)
- Head coach: Russ DeVette (11th season)

1965 Michigan Intercollegiate Athletic Association football standings
	Conf.					Overall
Team	W		L		T	W		L		T
Albion $	5	–	0	–	0	7	–	2	–	0
Kalamazoo	3	–	2	–	0	5	–	3	–	0
Hope	3	–	2	–	0	4	–	4	–	0
Olivet	2	–	3	–	0	3	–	6	–	0
Alma	1	–	4	–	0	3	–	5	–	0
Adrian	1	–	4	–	0	1	–	7	–	0
$ – Conference champion

The 1965 Hope Flying Dutchmen football team represented Hope College during the 1965 NCAA College Division football season. In their eleventh year under head coach Russ DeVette, the Flying Dutchmen compiled a 4–4 record (3–2 in MIAA games) and tied with Kalamazoo for second place in the MIAA.

== 1966 ==
1966 Hope Flying Dutchmen football
- Conference: Michigan Intercollegiate Athletic Association
- Record: 3–4 (2–3 MIAA)
- Head coach: Russ DeVette (12th season)

1966 Michigan Intercollegiate Athletic Association football standings
	Conf.					Overall
Team	W		L		T	W		L		T
Albion $	4	–	1	–	0	7	–	2	–	0
Olivet	3	–	2	–	0	5	–	3	–	0
Alma	3	–	2	–	0	5	–	4	–	0
Hope	2	–	3	–	0	3	–	4	–	0
Kalamazoo	2	–	3	–	0	3	–	5	–	0
Adrian	1	–	4	–	0	3	–	5	–	0
$ – Conference champion

The 1966 Hope Flying Dutchmen football team represented Hope College during the 1966 NCAA College Division football season. In their twelfth year under head coach Russ DeVette, the Flying Dutchmen compiled a 3–4 record (2–3 in MIAA games) and tied with Kalamazoo for fourth place in the MIAA.

== 1967 ==
1967 Hope Flying Dutchmen football
- Conference: Michigan Intercollegiate Athletic Association
- Record: 2–6 (1–3 MIAA)
- Head coach: Russ DeVette (13th season)

1967 Michigan Intercollegiate Athletic Association football standings
	Conf.					Overall
Team	W		L		T	W		L		T
No. 20 Alma $	5	–	0	–	0	8	–	0	–	0
Olivet	4	–	1	–	0	8	–	1	–	0
Albion	2	–	2	–	0	2	–	5	–	1
Hope	1	–	3	–	0	2	–	6	–	0
Kalamazoo	1	–	4	–	0	2	–	6	–	0
Adrian	1	–	4	–	0	1	–	7	–	0
$ – Conference champion; Rankings from NAIA poll

The 1967 Hope Flying Dutchmen football team represented Hope College during the 1967 NCAA College Division football season. In their 13th year under head coach Russ DeVette, the Flying Dutchmen compiled a 2–6 record (1–3 in MIAA games) and finished in fourth place in the MIAA.

== 1968 ==
1968 Hope Flying Dutchmen football
- Conference: Michigan Intercollegiate Athletic Association
- Record: 4–5 (2–3 MIAA)
- Head coach: Russ DeVette (14th season)

1968 Michigan Intercollegiate Athletic Association football standings
	Conf.					Overall
Team	W		L		T	W		L		T
No. 12 Alma $	5	–	0	–	0	8	–	0	–	0
Albion	4	–	1	–	0	6	–	3	–	0
Hope	2	–	3	–	0	4	–	5	–	0
Olivet	2	–	3	–	0	3	–	5	–	0
Kalamazoo	1	–	4	–	0	2	–	6	–	0
Adrian	1	–	4	–	0	1	–	7	–	0
$ – Conference champion; Rankings from NAIA poll

The 1968 Hope Flying Dutchmen football team represented Hope College during the 1968 NCAA College Division football season. In their 14th year under head coach Russ DeVette, the Flying Dutchmen compiled a 4–5 record (2–3 in MIAA games) and tied for third place in the MIAA.

== 1969 ==
1969 Hope Flying Dutchmen football
- Conference: Michigan Intercollegiate Athletic Association
- Record: 3–5–1 (2–3 MIAA)
- Head coach: Russ DeVette (15th season)

1969 Michigan Intercollegiate Athletic Association football standings
	Conf.					Overall
Team	W		L		T	W		L		T
Albion $	5	–	0	–	0	8	–	0	–	0
Alma	4	–	1	–	0	6	–	3	–	0
Kalamazoo	3	–	2	–	0	4	–	4	–	0
Hope	2	–	3	–	0	3	–	5	–	1
Olivet	1	–	4	–	0	1	–	8	–	0
Adrian	0	–	5	–	0	3	–	6	–	0
$ – Conference champion

The 1969 Hope Flying Dutchmen football team represented Hope College during the 1969 NCAA College Division football season. In their 15th year under head coach Russ DeVette, the Flying Dutchmen compiled a 3–5–1 record (2–3 in MIAA games) and finished in fourth place in the MIAA.

=== Schedule ===
Date	Opponent	Site	Result	Attendance	Source
September 13	at Defiance*	Defiance, OH	L 7–40		
September 20	Franklin*		T 13–13		
September 27	at Wheaton*	Wheaton, IL	L 14–23		
October 4	at Kalamazoo	Kalamazoo, MI	L 0–31		
October 11	Alma	Holland, MI	L 18–42		
October 18	Olivet	Holland, MI	W 24–22		
October 25	at Albion	Winter-Lau Field; Albion, MI	L 8–10	1,500–2,500	
November 1	Adrian	Holland, MI	W 29–12		
November 8	Taylor*		W 26–16		
*Non-conference game
