= 1961 Hoosier Conference football season =

- Sport: Football
- Number of teams: 6
- Co-champions: Taylor, Anderson (IN)

Football seasons
- ← 1960 1962 →

1961 Hoosier Conference football standings
	Conf.					Overall
Team	W		L		T	W		L		T
Taylor +	4	–	1	–	0	8	–	1	–	0
Anderson (IN) +	4	–	1	–	0	4	–	4	–	0
Hanover	3	–	2	–	0	3	–	6	–	0
Indiana Central	2	–	3	–	0	4	–	5	–	0
Franklin (IN)	1	–	4	–	0	3	–	6	–	0
Manchester (IN)	1	–	4	–	0	1	–	8	–	0
+ – Conference co-champions

The 1961 Hoosier Conference football season was the season of college football played by the six member schools of the Hoosier Conference (HC) as part of the 1961 college football season. The 1961 Taylor Trojans and Anderson Ravens football teams tied for the conference championship. Each had an equal 4–1 conference record. Anderson defeated Taylor in head-to-head competition. Taylor had the stronger overall record at 8–1 (Anderson went 4–4 overall).

== Teams ==
=== Taylor ===
1961 Taylor Trojans football

HC co-champion
- Conference: Hoosier Conference
- Record: 8–1 (4–1 HCC)
- Head coach: Bob Davenport (5th season)

The 1961 Taylor Trojans football team represented Taylor University of Upland, Indiana. In their fifth year under head coach Bob Davenport, the team compiled an 8–1 record (4–1 against HC opponents) and tied for the Hoosier Conference championship. The team was led by Dave Kastelein, who scored 62 points to lead all Indiana college football players in scoring.

Date	Opponent	Site	Result	Attendance	Source
September 16	at Indiana Central	Indianapolis, IN	W 21–13		
September 23	at Rose Poly*	Terre Haute, IN	W 73–0		
September 30	Earlham*	Upland, IN	W 21–7	2,000	
October 7	at Franklin (IN)	Franklin, IN	W 32–6		
October 14	Manchester (IN)	Upland, IN	W 13–7		
October 21	at Anderson (IN)	Anderson, IN	L 16–34		
October 28	Hanover	Upland, IN	W 14–7		
November 4	vs. Defiance*	Fort Wayne, IN	W 26–22		
November 11	Wilmington*	Upland, IN	W 34–13		
*Non-conference game

=== Anderson ===
1961 Anderson Ravens football

HC co-champion
- Conference: Hoosier Conference
- Record: 4–4 (4–1 HCC)
- Head coach: James Macholtz (9th season)

The 1961 Anderson Ravens football team represented Anderson University of Anderson, Indiana. In their ninth year under head coach James Macholtz, the team compiled a 4–4 record (4–1 against HC opponents) and tied for the Hoosier Conference championship.

Date	Opponent	Site	Result	Attendance	Source
September 23	at Franklin (IN)	Franklin, IN	W 12–7		
September 30	Manchester (IN)	Anderson, IN	W 13–0		
October 7	Hanover	Anderson, IN	W 26–13		
October 14	at Albion*	Alumni Field; Albion, MI	L 6–35	1,100	
October 21	at Taylor	Anderson, IN	W 34–16		
October 27	at Indiana Central	Indianapolis, IN	L 0–7		
November 4	Findlay*	Anderson, IN	L 7–25		
November 11	at Defiance*	Defiance, OH	L 20–28		
*Non-conference game

=== Hanover ===
1961 Hanover Panthers football
- Conference: Hoosier Conference
- Record: 3–6 (3–2 HCC)
- Head coach: Leo H. Kelly (7th season)

The 1961 Hanover Panthers football team represented Hanover College of Hanover, Indiana. In their seventh year under head coach Leo H. Kelly, the team compiled a 3–6 record (3–2 against conference opponents) and finished in third place in the Hoosier Conference.

Date	Opponent	Site	Result	Attendance	Source
September 16	Evansville*	Hanover, IN	L 0–26	2,000	
September 23	Georgetown (KY)*	Georgetown, KY	L 7–18		
September 30	Franklin (IN)	Madison, IN	W 20–19		
October 7	at Anderson (IN)	Anderson, IN	L 13–26	3,000	
October 14	at Wabash*	Ingalls Field; Crawfordsville, IN	L 13–35	3,000	
October 21	Centre*	Hanover, IN	L 12–26		
October 28	at Taylor	Upland, IN	L 7–14		
November 4	Indiana Central	Madison, IN	W 7–6		
November 11	at Manchester (IN)	Manchester, IN	W 16–12		
*Non-conference game

=== Indiana Central ===
1961 Indiana Central Greyhounds football
- Conference: Hoosier Conference
- Record: 4–5 (2–3 HCC)
- Head coach: Jay Windell (4th season)

The 1961 Indiana Central Greyhounds football team represented Indiana Central College (now known as University of Indiana of Indianapolis, Indiana. In their fourth and final year under head coach Jay Windell, the team compiled a 4–5 record (2–3 against conference opponents) and finished in fourth place in the Hoosier Conference.

Date	Opponent	Site	Result	Attendance	Source
September 16	Taylor	Indianapolis, IN	L 13–21		
September 23	at Olivet*	Olivet, MI	L 6–22		
September 30	Indiana State*^{†}	Indianapolis, IN	W 26–20		
October 7	at Manchester (IN)	North Manchester, IN	W 20–14		
October 14	Chicago Illini*	Indianapolis, IN	W 6–0		
October 21	at Franklin (IN)	Franklin, IN	L 20–28		
October 27	Anderson (IN)	Indianapolis, IN	W 7–0		
November 4	at Hanover	Madison, IN	L 6–7		
November 11	at Earlham*	Reid Field; Richmond, IN	L 0–16	2,500	
*Non-conference game; ^{†}Homecoming

=== Franklin ===
1961 Franklin Grizzlies football
- Conference: Hoosier Conference
- Record: 3–6 (1–4 HCC)
- Head coach: Stewart Faught (5th season)
- Home stadium: Goodell Field

The 1961 Franklin Grizzlies football team represented Franklin College of Franklin, Indiana. In their fifth year under head coach Stewart Faught, the team compiled a 3–6 record (1–4 against conference opponents) and tied for fifth and last place in the Hoosier Conference.

Date	Opponent	Site	Result	Attendance	Source
September 16	Olivet*	Goodell Field; Franklin, IN	L 7–27	600	
September 23	Anderson (IN)	Goodell Field; Franklin, IN	L 7–12		
September 30	at Hanover	Madison, IN	L 19–20		
October 7	Taylor	Goodell Field; Franklin, IN	L 6–32		
October 14	at Earlham*	Reid Field; Richmond, IN	L 32–34		
October 21	Indiana Central^{†}	Goodell Field; Franklin, IN	W 28–20	2,000	
October 28	at Manchester (IN)	North Manchester, IN	L 14–20		
November 4	Georgetown (KY)*	Goodell Field; Franklin, IN	W 20–12		
November 11	at Rose Poly*	Terre Haute, IN	W 63–0		
*Non-conference game; ^{†}Homecoming

=== Manchester ===
1961 Manchester Spartans football
- Conference: Hoosier Conference
- Record: 1–8 (1–4 HCC)
- Head coach: Eldred A. Weddle (6th season)

The 1961 Manchester Spartans football team represented Manchester University of North Manchester, Indiana. In their sixth and final year under head coach Eldred A. Weddle, the team compiled a 1–8 record (1–4 against conference opponents) and tied for fifth and last place in the Hoosier Conference.

Date	Opponent	Site	Result	Attendance	Source
September 16	at Ashland*	Redwood Stadium; Ashland, OH	L 0–21		
September 23	Augustana (IL)*	North Manchester, IN	L 6–14		
September 30	at Anderson (IN)	Anderson, IN	L 0–13		
October 7	Indiana Central	North Manchester, IN	L 14–20		
October 14	at Taylor	Upland, IN	L 7–13		
October 21	at Earlham*	Reid Field; Richmond, IN	L 14–39	2,500	
October 28	Franklin (IN)	North Manchester, IN	W 20–14		
November 4	at Bluffton*	Bluffton, OH	L 14–28		
November 11	Hanover	North Manchester, IN	L 12–16		
*Non-conference game
