= Henry Frazer =

Henry Frazer may refer to:

- Henry Frazer, see List of World Championships medalists in sailing (keelboat classes)
- Henry Dewar (physician), originally Frazer or Fraser

== See also ==
- Henry Fraser (disambiguation)
