= Lansing Catholic High School =

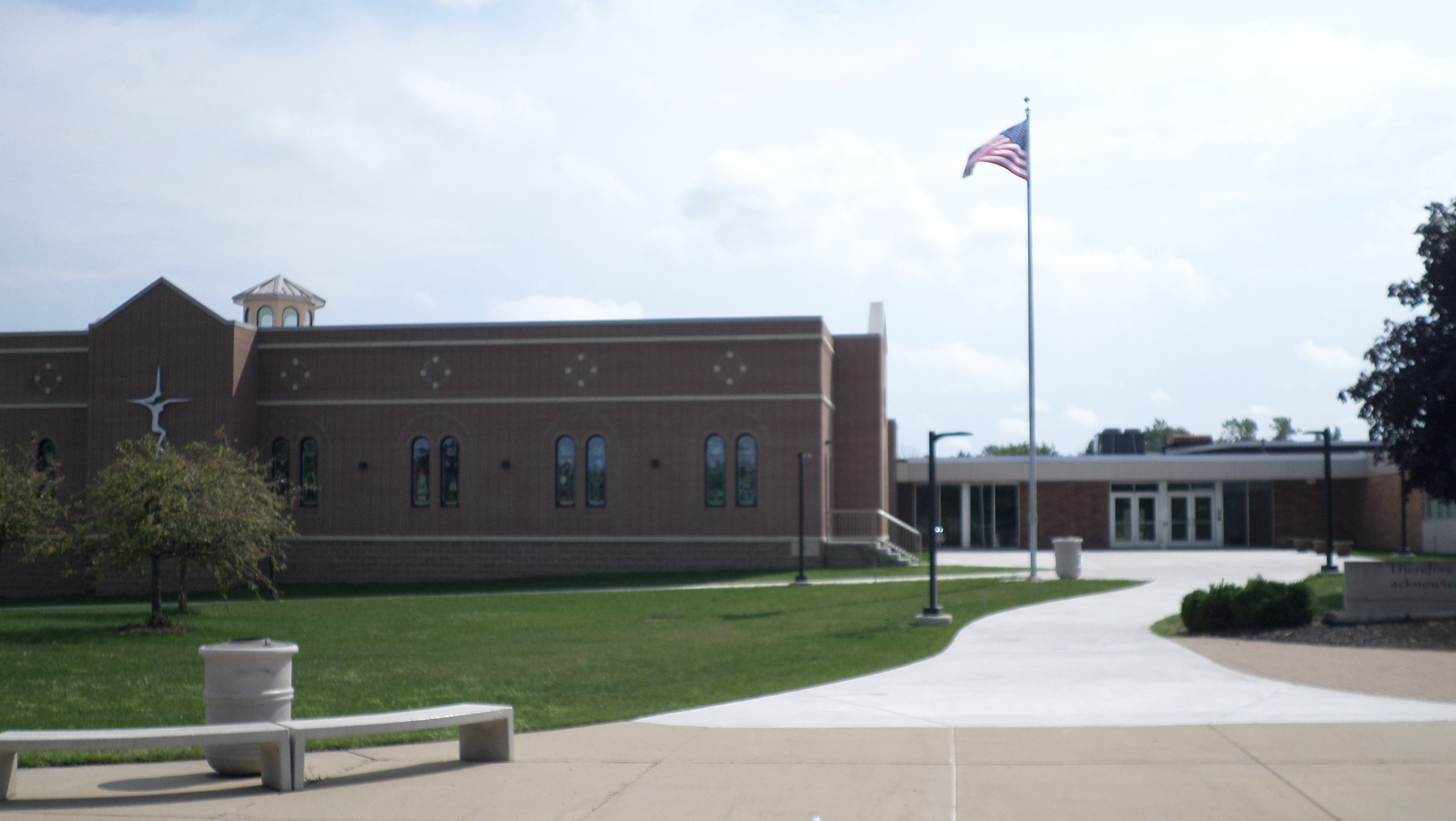
- The school in September 2015

Location
- 501 Marshall Street; Lansing, Michigan 48912; United States; 42°44′20″N 84°31′43″W

Information
- Type: Private
- Motto: Docere Modum Vivendi (Teaching a way of life)
- Religious affiliation: Roman Catholic
- Established: 1970
- Oversight: Diocese of Lansing
- President: Dominic Iocco
- Principal: Dominic Iocco (Interim)
- Chaplain: Fr. Joseph Campbell
- Grades: 9–12
- Gender: Coeducational
- Enrollment: 440 (2020-2021)
- Colors: Columbia Blue, Black and White
- Athletics conference: CAAC
- Nickname: Cougars
- Accreditation: NCEA
- Publication: Totus Tuus
- Yearbook: Reflections
- Tuition: www.lansingcatholic.org/admissions/tuition-fees/
- Website: www.lansingcatholic.org

Lansing Catholic High School is a private, Roman Catholic high school in Lansing, Michigan. It is located in the Roman Catholic Diocese of Lansing.

== History ==
St. Mary High School was established in 1900. Resurrection High School was established in 1935. In 1963, St. Mary High School was closed and Monsignor John W. O'Rafferty High School was opened in Delta Township. At the same time, Resurrection High School was closed and Monsignor John A. Gabriels High School was opened at the corner of W. Saginaw and Marshall St. Due to financial struggles, the two schools were consolidated in 1970 on the Gabriels campus and the school was renamed Lansing Catholic Central High School. It was later again renamed Lansing Catholic High School. The O'Rafferty Campus was sold to Michigan National Bank and became its primary vault and partial headquarters. The site, located on W. Saginaw Hwy, was later in operation as a call center for LaSalle Bank.

In the 2018–19 school year, LCHS instituted the House System as a new way of organizing the school. That year, four houses were established, and every student and staff member was sorted into one of the four. The four houses of Lansing Catholic are Joseph House, Tekakwitha House, De Porres House, and Frassati House. Each house is named after a Saint that is represented in the LCHS chapel. The school's patron is Pope John Paul II.

== Dominican Sisters of Mary ==
Lansing Catholic High School has several Sisters from the Dominican Sisters of Mary, Mother of the Eucharist as part of the teaching staff.

== Performing arts ==
Lansing Catholic offers a concert and marching band, a jazz band and a choir. In addition, the band, choir and drama department produces at least two stage shows every school year.

== Athletics ==
The LCHS Cougars are members of the Capital Area Activities Conference. The school colors are Columbia blue, black and white. As of August 2023, the athletic director is Kenny Goodrich.

Boys cross country won the state championship in 2015. Boys track took the state championship in both 2012 and 2022. Girls golf brought home the state title 2010–2012. The boys basketball team were state champs in 2008. The girls basketball team won the Division 2 state championship in 2023. The boys and girls bowling team captured the state title in 2023. LCHS won state championships in football in 1985, 2019, and 2021. The following MHSAA sanctioned sports are offered:

=== Fall ===
- Football
- Boys Tennis
- Boys Soccer
- Boys & Girls Cross Country
- Girls Volleyball
- Girls Golf
- Girls Swimming & Diving*

=== Winter ===
- Boys Basketball
- Hockey
- Boys Swimming & Diving*
- Boys & Girls Bowling
- Girls Basketball
- Competitive Cheer Team

=== Spring ===
- Baseball
- Boys & Girls Track & Field
- Boys Golf
- Softball
- Girls Tennis
- Girls Soccer
- Boys & Girls Lacrosse*

(Those marked with ^{*} are in conjunction with Waverly Senior High School)

== Notable alumni ==
- Perry Costello, Umpire
- Dave "Mad Dog" DeMarco, Radio Personality
- Mark Murray, 1972, former president of Meijer, Grand Valley State University, and Treasurer of Michigan
- Tony Poljan, NFL TE
- Cooper Rush, 2012, NFL Quarterback
- Craig Rundle, College football coach. Graduated from Gabriel's High School
- Amalia Villarreal, soccer player

== Podcast ==
The Lansing Catholic Podcast, and its subsidiary Cougar Chat is a podcast hosted by the Chaplain, Fr. Joe Campbell, and the Dean of Intellectual Formation, Mr. Chris Stolpa. The weekly format features updates on the daily happenings of the school as well as high energy interviews with students, staff, and members of the community. It is ranked in the top 20 of Best Lansing Podcasts by Feedspot, as well as selected by MillionPodcasts as one of the Top 30 Christian School Podcasts and Top 90 Christian Students Podcasts on the web.

It is currently produced by LCHS 11th grade Nathan Gross.
