= 1961 Mid-Ohio League football season =

- Sport: Football
- Teams: 6
- Champion: Findlay

Football seasons
- 1960 1962

1961 Mid-Ohio League football standings
	Conf.					Overall
Team	W		L		T	W		L		T
Findlay $	5	–	0	–	0	7	–	3	–	0
Ohio Northern	4	–	1	–	0	6	–	3	–	0
Bluffton	2	–	3	–	0	5	–	3	–	0
Defiance	2	–	3	–	0	3	–	5	–	0
Ashland	2	–	3	–	0	3	–	6	–	0
Wilmington (OH)	0	–	5	–	0	0	–	8	–	0
$ – Conference champion

The 1961 Mid-Ohio League football season was the season of college football played by the six member schools of the Mid-Ohio League (MOL) as part of the 1961 college football season. The 1961 Findlay Oilers football team compiled a 7–3 record (5–0 in conference games) and won the MOL championship.

== Teams ==
=== Findlay ===
1961 Findlay Oilers football

MOL champion
- Conference: Mid-Ohio League
- Record: 7–3 (5–0 MOL)
- Head coach: Louis B. Juillerat (1st season)

The 1961 Findlay Oilers football team represented Findlay College (now known as the University of Findlay) of Findlay, Ohio. In their first year under head coach Louis B. Juillerat, the team compiled a 7–3 record (5–0 against MOL opponents) and won the MOL championship.

Date	Opponent	Site	Result	Attendance	Source
September 16	Adrian*	Findlay, OH	W 20–8		
September 23	at Otterbein*	Westerville, OH	L 6–20	2,800	
September 30	at Wilmington (OH)	Wilmington, OH	W 36–8		
October 7	Ohio Northern	Findlay, OH	W 22–0		
October 14	Ashland	Findlay, OH	W 28–6		
October 21	at Bluffton	Bluffton, OH	W 28–6		
October 28	at Defiance	Defiance, OH	W 16–8		
November 4	at Anderson*	Anderson, IN	W 25–7		
November 11	No. 2 Baldwin-Wallace*	Findlay, OH	L 8–14	6,000	
November 18	at Muskingum*	New Concord, OH	L 0–32		
*Non-conference game; Rankings from AP Poll released prior to the game

=== Ohio Northern ===
1961 Ohio Northern Polar Bears football
- Conference: Mid-Ohio League
- Record: 6–3 (4–1 MOL)
- Head coach: Arden Roberson (2nd season)

The 1961 Ohio Northern Polar Bears football team represented Ohio Northern University of Ada, Ohio. In their second year under head coach Arden Roberson, the team compiled a 6–3 record (4–1 against MOL opponents) and finished second in the MOL.

Date	Opponent	Site	Result	Attendance	Source
September 16	at Alma	Alma, MI	W 8–7		
September 23	at Ferris Institute*	Big Rapids, MI	L 7–12		
September 30	Defiance	Ada, OH	W 40–20		
October 7	at Findlay	Findlay, OH	L 0–22		
October 14	Wilmington^{†}	Ada, OH	W 63–8		
October 21	at Ashland	Redwood Stadium; Ashland, OH	W 28–13	3,500	
October 28	Bluffton	Ada, OH	W 18–0		
November 4	Olivet*	Ada, OH	L 3–6		
November 11	Ball State*	Ada, OH	W 49–20		
*Non-conference game; ^{†}Homecoming

=== Bluffton ===
1961 Bluffton Beavers football
- Conference: Mid-Ohio League
- Record: 5–3 (2–3 MOL)
- Head coach: Kenneth Mast (11th season)

The 1961 Bluffton Beavers football team represented Bluffton University of Bluffton, Ohio. In their eleventh year under head coach Kenneth Mast, the team compiled a 5–3 record (2–3 against MOL opponents) and tied for third place in the MOL.

Date	Opponent	Site	Result	Attendance	Source
September 16	at Grand Rapids*	Grand Rapids, MI	W 28–0		
September 23	Alma*	Bluffton, OH	W 14–0	2,000	
September 30	Ashland	Bluffton, OH	L 20–40		
October 7	at Wilmington	Wilmington, OH	W 8–6		
October 14	at Defiance	Defiance, OH	W 32–6		
October 21	Findlay	Bluffton, OH	L 6–28		
October 28	at Ohio Northern	Ada, OH	L 0–18		
November 4	Manchester*	Bluffton, OH	W 28–14		
*Non-conference game

=== Defiance ===
1961 Defiance Yellow Jackets football
- Conference: Mid-Ohio League
- Record: 3–5 (2–3 MOL)
- Head coach: Dick Small (8th season)

The 1961 Defiance Yellow Jackets football team represented Defiance College of Defiance, Ohio. In their eighth year under head coach Dick Small, the team compiled a 3–5 record (2–3 against MOL opponents) and tied for third place in the MOL.

Date	Opponent	Site	Result	Attendance	Source
September 23	at Adrian*	Adrian, MI	L 0–7		
September 30	at Ohio Northern	Ada, OH	L 20–40		
October 7	at Ashland	Redwood Stadium; Ashland, OH	W 25–8		
October 14	Bluffton	Defiance, OH	L 6–32		
October 21	Wilmington	Defiance, OH	W 48–26		
October 28	Findlay	Defiance, OH	L 8–15		
November 4	vs. Taylor*	Fort Wayne, IN	L 22–26		
November 11	Anderson*	Defiance, OH	W 28–20		
*Non-conference game

=== Ashland ===
1961 Ashland Eagles football
- Conference: Mid-Ohio League
- Record: 3–6 (2–3 MOL)
- Head coach: Fred Martinelli (3rd season)
- Home stadium: Redwood Stadium

The 1961 Ashland Eagles football team represented Ashland University of Ashland, Ohio. In their third year under head coach Fred Martinelli, the team compiled a 3–6 record (2–3 against MOL opponents) and tied for third place in the MOL.

Date	Opponent	Site	Result	Attendance	Source
September 16	Manchester*	Redwood Stadium; Ashland, OH	W 21–0		
September 23	Wooster*	Redwood Stadium; Ashland, OH	L 6–28		
September 30	at Bluffton	Bluffton, OH	W 40–20		
October 7	Defiance*	Redwood Stadium; Ashland, OH	L 8–25		
October 14	at Findlay	Findlay, OH	L 6–28		
October 21	Ohio Northern	Redwood Stadium; Ashland, OH	L 13–28		
October 28	at Wilmington (OH)	Wilmington, OH	W 21–6		
November 4	at Otterbein*	Westerville, OH	L 13–15	2,000	
November 11	Mount Union*	Redwood Stadium; Ashland, OH	L 13–25		
*Non-conference game

=== Wilmington ===
1961 Wilmington Quakers football
- Conference: Mid-Ohio League
- Record: 0–8 (0–5 MOL)
- Head coach: C. W. Van Schoyck (2nd season)

The 1961 Wilmington Quakers football team represented Wilmington College of Wilmington, Ohio. In their second year under head coach C. W. Van Schoyck, the team compiled a 0–8 record (0–5 against MOL opponents) and finished in last place in the MOL.

Date	Opponent	Site	Result	Attendance	Source
September 23	Kenyon*	Gambier, OH	L 0–26		
September 30	Findlay	Wilmington, OH	L 8–36		
October 7	Bluffton	Wilmington, OH	L 6–8		
October 14	Ohio Northern	Ada, OH	L 8–63		
October 21	Defiance	Defiance, OH	L 26–48		
October 28	Ashland	Wilmington, OH	L 6–21		
November 4	Earlham*	Wilmington, OH	L 0–26		
November 11	Taylor*	Upland, IN	L 13–34		
*Non-conference game
