= Stewart Faught =

American football player and coach (1924–2005)

Biographical details
- Born: January 7, 1924; Sullivan, Indiana, U.S.
- Died: September 16, 2005 (aged 81); Franklin, Indiana, U.S.

Playing career

Football
- 1943–1946: Indiana State
- Position: Quarterback

Coaching career (HC unless noted)

Football
- 1948–1951: South Bend Riley HS (IN) (assistant)
- 1952–1954: Linton-Stockton HS (IN)
- 1955–1956: Clinton HS (IN)
- 1957–1988: Franklin (IN)
- 1990–1991: Georgetown (KY) (OC)
- 1997: Georgetown (KY) (OC)

Head coaching record
- Overall: 155–146–6 (college)
- Tournaments: 0–1 (NAIA D-II playoffs)

Accomplishments and honors

Championships
- 1 Hoosier (1966); 2 HCC (1980–1981)

Awards
- 3× Hoosier Coach of the Year

Stewart "Red" Faught (January 7, 1924 – September 16, 2005) was an American football player and coach. He served as the head football coach at Franklin College in Franklin, Indiana, from 1957 to 1988, compiling a record of 155–146–6 . As college football player, Faught was the starting quarterback at Indiana State University.

Following his tenure at Franklin, Faught joined the Georgetown Tigers staff as the offensive coordinator. In 1991, the Tigers won the NAIA Division II Football National Championship.

== Head coaching record ==
=== High school ===
Year	Team	Overall	Conference	Standing	Bowl/playoffs
Clinton Wildcats (Western Indiana Conference) (1955–1956)
1955	Clinton	5–5	3–2	2nd	
1956	Clinton	4–6	2–3	4th	
Clinton:		9–11	5–5		
Total:		9–11			

=== College ===
Year	Team	Overall	Conference	Standing	Bowl/playoffs
Franklin Grizzlies (Hoosier/Hoosier–Buckeye Conference) (1957–1969)
1957	Franklin	4–5	1–4	6th	
1958	Franklin	2–6	1–4	T–5th	
1959	Franklin	5–4	3–2	T–2nd	
1960	Franklin	5–4	3–2	T–2nd	
1961	Franklin	1–8	1–4	T–5th	
1962	Franklin	3–4–2	2–1–2	3rd	
1963	Franklin	6–3	3–2	T–2nd	
1964	Franklin	6–3	4–1	2nd	
1965	Franklin	3–5–1	2–2–1	4th	
1966	Franklin	4–5	4–1	T–1st	
1967	Franklin	6–4	4–2	2nd	
1968	Franklin	2–8	1–5	T–6th	
1969	Franklin	4–4–1	3–3	T–3rd	
Franklin Grizzlies (NAIA Division II independent) (1970–1977)
1970	Franklin	7–3			
1971	Franklin	5–5			
1972	Franklin	8–3			L NAIA Division II Semifinal
1973	Franklin	5–4			
1974	Franklin	4–6			
1975	Franklin	6–4			
1976	Franklin	6–3			
1977	Franklin	8–2			
Franklin Grizzlies (Heartland Collegiate Conference) (1978–1986)
1978	Franklin	1–9	1–6	6th	
1979	Franklin	6–4	5–2	2nd	
1980	Franklin	8–2	5–2	T–1st	
1981	Franklin	8–2	6–1	T–1st	
1982	Franklin	6–4	5–2	T–2nd	
1983	Franklin	4–6	2–4	T–4th	
1984	Franklin	5–4–1	3–2–1	4th	
1985	Franklin	5–4–1	2–4–1	4th	
1986	Franklin	3–7	2–4	T–5th	
Franklin Grizzlies (NAIA Division II independent) (1987–1988)
1987	Franklin	2–8			
1988	Franklin	7–3			
Franklin:		155–146–6	63–60–5		
Total:		155–146–6			
National championship Conference title Conference division title or championship game berth
