= Stuart Parsell =

American football coach and college athletics administrator (1928–2015)

Biographical details
- Born: August 6, 1928
- Died: November 19, 2015 (aged 87); Suttons Bay, Michigan, U.S.
- Education: Michigan State University

Coaching career (HC unless noted)
- 1959–1970: Olivet

Administrative career (AD unless noted)
- 1960–1971: Olivet

Head coaching record
- Overall: 47–57 (college)

Accomplishments and honors

Awards
- Michigan Coach of the Year (1961); Olivet College Athletic Hall of Fame (1977)

Records
- Most wins in Olivet football history (47)

Stuart Frank Parsell (August 6, 1928 – November 19, 2015) was an American football coach and college athletics administrator. He served as the head football coach at Olivet College in Olivet, Michigan from 1959 to 1970, compiling a record of 47–57. Parsell was also the athletic director at Olivet from 1960 to 1971.

== Head coaching record ==
=== College ===
| Year | Team | Overall | Conference | Standing | Bowl/playoffs |
|---|---|---|---|---|---|
Olivet Comets (Michigan Intercollegiate Athletic Association) (1959–1970)
| 1959 | Olivet | 3–5 | 1–5 | T–5th | |
| 1960 | Olivet | 3–5 | 1–4 | 5th | |
| 1961 | Olivet | 8–1 | 4–1 | 2nd | |
| 1962 | Olivet | 6–3 | 3–2 | T–2nd | |
| 1963 | Olivet | 1–8 | 0–5 | 6th | |
| 1964 | Olivet | 6–3 | 4–1 | 2nd | |
| 1965 | Olivet | 3–6 | 2–3 | 4th | |
| 1966 | Olivet | 5–3 | 3–2 | T–2nd | |
| 1967 | Olivet | 8–1 | 4–1 | 2nd | |
| 1968 | Olivet | 3–5 | 2–3 | T–3rd | |
| 1969 | Olivet | 1–8 | 1–4 | 5th | |
| 1972 | Olivet | 0–9 | 0–5 | 6th | |
| Olivet: | | 47–57 | 25–36 | | |
| Total: | | 47–57 | | | |
