= Tony Poljan =

American football player (born 1997)

No. 83
- Position: Tight end

Personal information
- Born: April 25, 1997 (age 29); Lansing, Michigan, U.S.
- Listed height: 6 ft 7 in (2.01 m)
- Listed weight: 251 lb (114 kg)

Career information
- High school: Lansing Catholic
- College: Central Michigan (2016–2019); Virginia (2020)
- NFL draft: 2021: undrafted

Career history
- Baltimore Ravens (2021)

Awards and highlights
- Second-team All-MAC (2019)

Tony Poljan (born April 25, 1997) is an American former professional football player who was a tight end for the Baltimore Ravens of the National Football League (NFL). He played college football for the Central Michigan Chippewas and Virginia Cavaliers. He played in one game in the NFL for the Ravens in 2021.

== Early life ==
Poljan grew up in Lansing, Michigan, and attended Lansing Catholic High School, where he played basketball and football and also lettered in track and field. He became the Cougars' starting quarterback as a sophomore and passed for 2,802 yards and 34 touchdowns as a junior while also rushing for 1,017 yards and 22 touchdowns. As a senior, Poljan passed for 1,907 yards and 16 touchdowns, rushed for 1,237 yards and 25 touchdowns and was named first-team Division 5–6 all-state and the Michigan Gatorade Player of the Year.

Poljan originally committed to play college football at Minnesota, but de-committed following the retirement of head coach Jerry Kill. He ultimately signed to play at Central Michigan, where his father had played, over offers from Nebraska, Iowa State and Michigan State, whose coaches wanted him to move to another position. Poljan also had scholarship offers to play basketball at Toledo and Central Michigan.

== College career ==
Poljan redshirted his freshman season with the Central Michigan Chippewas. He played quarterback and wide receiver as a redshirt freshman and completed 13-of-21 passes for 78 yards, rushed for 125 yards and one touchdown, and had five receptions for 97 yards. He began his sophomore season as the Chippewas starting quarterback, but ultimately split time between quarterback and tight end, completing 51.7 percent of his passes for 625 yards with two touchdowns and five interceptions with 123 rushing yards and one touchdown while catching seven passes for 125 yards and two touchdowns. As a junior, Poljan solely played tight end and was named second-team All-Mid-American Conference after catching 33 passes for 496 yards and four touchdowns. Poljan graduated at the end of his junior year and announced that he would be entering the transfer portal and ultimately committed to join Virginia as a graduate transfer. Poljan caught 38 passes for 411 yards and six touchdowns in his lone season with the Cavaliers.

== Professional career ==
=== Baltimore Ravens ===
Poljan signed with the Baltimore Ravens as an undrafted free agent on May 13, 2021. He was waived on August 31, and was re-signed to the team's practice squad the following day.

Poljan signed a reserve/future contract with the Ravens on January 10, 2022. On August 30, Poljan was waived by the Ravens as part of final roster cuts.
