= Louis B. Juillerat =

American football and track and field coach (1915–1969)

Biographical details
- Born: May 30, 1915; Fort Oglethorpe, Georgia, U.S.
- Died: January 17, 1969 (aged 53); Dallas, Texas, U.S.

Playing career

Football
- 1938–1939: Muskingum
- Positions: Guard, tackle

Coaching career (HC unless noted)

Football
- 1940: Coventry HS (OH) (line)
- 1941–1942: Tallmadge HS (OH)
- 1948–1950: Akron South HS (OH)
- 1951–1953: Baldwin–Wallace
- 1954–1960: Troy HS (OH)
- 1961–1962: Findlay
- 1963–1967: Northwood

Track and field
- 1946: Ohio State

Head coaching record
- Overall: 43–40 (college football)

Accomplishments and honors

Championships
- Football; 1 Mid-Ohio (1961)

Louis Baxter Juillerat (May 30, 1915 – January 17, 1969) was an American football and track coach. He served as the head football coach at Baldwin—Wallace College (now known as Baldwin Wallace University) in Berea, Ohio from 1951 to 1953, Findlay College (now known as the University of Findlay) in Findlay, Ohio from 1961 to 1962, and Northwood Institute (now known as Northwood University) in Midland, Michigan from 1963 to 1967, compiling a career college football head coaching record of 43–40.

Juillerat was born on May 30, 1915, in Fort Oglethorpe, Georgia. He graduated in 1934 from South High School in Akron, Ohio. Juillerat earned a master's degree from Ohio State University, and served as a trainer for the Ohio State Buckeyes track and field in 1946. Juillerat died on January 17, 1969, in Dallas, after having suffered a stroke two days prior.

== Head coaching record ==
=== College ===
Year	Team	Overall	Conference	Standing	Bowl/playoffs
Baldwin–Wallace Yellow Jackets (Independent) (1951–1953)
1951	Baldwin–Wallace	3–5			
1952	Baldwin–Wallace	4–4			
1953	Baldwin–Wallace	4–4			
Baldwin–Wallace:		11–13			
Findlay Oilers (Mid-Ohio League) (1961)
1961	Findlay	7–3	5–0	1st	
Findlay Oilers (NAIA independent) (1962)
1962	Findlay	4–5			
Findlay:		11–8	5–0		
Northwood Timberwolves (NAIA independent) (1963–1967)
1963	Northwood	3–4			
1964	Northwood	4–3			
1965	Northwood	5–5			
1966	Northwood	4–4			
1967	Northwood	5–3			
Northwood:		21–19			
Total:		43–40			
National championship Conference title Conference division title or championship game berth
