= Kenneth Mast =

American athletics coach (1926–2025)

Biographical details
- Born: February 2, 1926; Sugarcreek, Ohio, U.S.
- Died: April 10, 2025 (aged 99); Crystal River, Florida, U.S.
- Education: Heidelberg College (1950)

Playing career

Football
- 1947–1950: Heidelberg

Basketball
- 1947–1950: Heidelberg

Golf
- 1947–1950: Heidelberg

Coaching career (HC unless noted)

Football
- 1951–1967: Bluffton

Basketball
- 1950–1966: Bluffton

Track and field
- 1951–1967: Bluffton

Golf
- 1951–1967: Bluffton

Head coaching record
- Overall: 90–52–4 (football); 140–208 (basketball)

Accomplishments and honors

Championships
- Football; 8 MOL / MOC (1951, 1956–1960, 1962, 1967); Basketball; MOC (1965)

Kenneth E. Mast (February 2, 1926 - April 10, 2025) was an American former college athletics coach. He was the head football coach for Bluffton College—now known as Bluffton University—from 1951 to 1967. He was also the head basketball coach from 1950 to 1966, track and field coach from 1951 to 1967, and the golf team's coach from 1951 to 1967.

== Playing career ==
Mast played college football, basketball, and golf for Heidelberg.

== Coaching career ==
Following Mast's graduation he became the head football coach for Bluffton as the successor to A. C. Burcky. In seventeen seasons as head coach he led the team to a 90–52–4 record and won eight conference championships; including five straight from 1956 and 1960. He resigned after the 1967 season.

Mast was the head basketball coach for Bluffton to 1950 to 1966. He recorded an overall record of 140–208. He won one conference championship in 1965.

Mast also coached Bluffton's track and field team and began its golf team.

== Head coaching record ==
=== Football ===
Year	Team	Overall	Conference	Standing	Bowl/playoffs
Bluffton Beavers (Mid-Ohio League / Mid-Ohio Conference) (1951–1967)
1951	Bluffton	6–2	4–1	T–1st	
1952	Bluffton	5–4	3–2	3rd	
1953	Bluffton	3–4	2–2	T–2nd	
1954	Bluffton	4–4	2–2	4th	
1955	Bluffton	3–6	2–3	4th	
1956	Bluffton	8–1	5–0	1st	
1957	Bluffton	7–2	5–0	1st	
1958	Bluffton	8–1	5–0	1st	
1959	Bluffton	6–3	5–0	1st	
1960	Bluffton	5–3–1	4–1	T–1st	
1961	Bluffton	5–3	2–3	T–3rd	
1962	Bluffton	5–3	2–1	T–1st	
1963	Bluffton	7–2	2–1	2nd	
1964	Bluffton	3–5–1	2–1	2nd	
1965	Bluffton	7–2	2–1	2nd	
1966	Bluffton	3–4–1	1–1	2nd	
1967	Bluffton	5–3–1	2–0	1st	
Bluffton:		90–52–4	50–19		
Total:		90–52–4			
National championship Conference title Conference division title or championship game berth

=== Men's basketball ===
Record table
Season	Team	Overall	Conference	Standing	Postseason
Bluffton Beavers (Mid-Ohio League / Mid-Ohio Conference) (1950–1966)
1950	Bluffton	7–13	3–7	5th	
1951	Bluffton	4–15	2–8	5th	
1952	Bluffton	7–11	4–6	4th	
1953	Bluffton	12–9	6–4	2nd	
1954	Bluffton	4–16	2–10	6th	
1955	Bluffton	6–13	3–9	6th	
1956	Bluffton	7–13	4–8	5th	
1957	Bluffton	9–10	4–7	T–4th	
1958	Bluffton	10–10	6–6	4th	
1959	Bluffton	9–12	3–9	6th	
1960	Bluffton	4–17	3–9	6th	
1961	Bluffton	5–15	2–10	7th	
1962	Bluffton	6–15	3–5	T–4th	
1963	Bluffton	11–9	2–6	4th	
1964	Bluffton	12–9	4–4	3rd	
1965	Bluffton	17–6	9–1	1st	
1966	Bluffton	10–15	5–3	2nd	
Bluffton:		140–208	65–112		
Total:		140–208			
National champion Postseason invitational champion Conference regular season champion Conference regular season and conference tournament champion Division regular season champion Division regular season and conference tournament champion Conference tournament champion
