= Tom J. Taylor =

American football coach (1934–2014)

Biographical details
- Born: February 10, 1934; Newberry, Michigan, U.S.
- Died: April 27, 2014 (aged 80); Marquette, Michigan, U.S.
- Education: Albion College (1959); Northern Michigan College (1962)

Playing career
- 1955–1958: Albion
- Position: End

Coaching career (HC unless noted)
- 1959–1961: Clarkston HS (MI)
- 1962–1968: Albion (line)
- 1969–1972: Albion
- 1973–1976: Northern Michigan (RB)

Head coaching record
- Overall: 13–20–2 (college)

Accomplishments and honors

Championships
- 1 MIAA (1969)

Awards
- Albion Britons No. 33 retired Albion Hall of Fame (1989); Little All-American (1957–1958)

Thomas Joseph Taylor (February 10, 1934 – April 27, 2014) was an American college football coach. He was the head football coach for Albion College from 1969 to 1972.

== Early life and playing career ==
Taylor was born on February 10, 1934, in Newberry, Michigan, to Pat and Marie Taylor. He played high school football for Newberry High School in Newberry, Michigan, under head coach Morley Fraser. He was a member of three straight championship teams for Newberry between 1949 and 1951. He capped off his high school career as an All-State player in 1951.

Taylor played college football for Albion as an end under his high school coach Fraser. He was a two-time Little-All American in 1957 and 1958. He was also named Albion's MVP for three consecutive seasons from 1956 to 1958. He was a co-captain in his junior and senior years. He participated in the All-American Bowl following his senior season. Taylor graduated from Albion College in 1959. In 1962, he earned his Master's Degree in education from Northern Michigan University.

== Coaching career ==
Taylor began his coaching career as the head football coach for Clarkston High School. He maintained that post for three seasons. In 1962, he rejoined Fraser for his third stint alongside him, this time as Albion's line coach. In seven season as an assistant, he helped lead the team to four Minnesota Intercollegiate Athletic Conference (MIAA) and an undefeated season in 1965. When Fraser resigned to become the athletic director for Albion following the 1968 season, Taylor was named head football coach. In four seasons as head coach he led the team to a 13–20–2 record. In his first season, he led the team to an undefeated 8–0 record and a MIAA conference championship. He was named Michigan College Coach of the Year after the season. He resigned following the 1972 season after three straight losing seasons. In 1973, he was hired as the running backs coach for Northern Michigan under head coach Rae Drake. He replaced Frank Novak who became the offensive coordinator for East Carolina. He was retained under head coach Gil Krueger in 1974. He retired from coaching following the 1976 season.

== Later career, honors, and death ==
During Taylor's coaching career he served on the physical education staffs for Clarkston High School and Albion. In 1972, after serving as an associate professor of physical education he requested a reassignment following his resignation from coaching.

After Taylor retired from coaching, he served as a student financial aid advisor for Northern Michigan University. He retired in 1994.

In 1989, Taylor was inducted into the Albion Hall of Fame. He also became the fourth player in Albion football history to have their number retired.

Taylor was married to Dorothy and they had five children together. He died on April 27, 2014, in Marquette, Michigan.

== Head coaching record ==
=== College ===
Year	Team	Overall	Conference	Standing	Bowl/playoffs
Albion Britons (Michigan Intercollegiate Athletic Association) (1969–1972)
1969	Albion	8–0	5–0	1st	
1970	Albion	3–6	3–2	T–3rd	
1971	Albion	0–7–2	0–4–1	6th	
1972	Albion	2–7	0–5	6th	
Albion:		13–20–2	8–11–1		
Total:		13–20–2			
National championship Conference title Conference division title or championship game berth
