= R. W. Bechtel =

American football and basketball coach

Biographical details
- Died: 1955; Milwaukie, Oregon, U.S.

Playing career

Football
- 1914–1916: Wittenberg
- Position: Quarterback

Coaching career (HC unless noted)

Football
- 1922–1923: Baldwin–Wallace
- 1924–1926: Albion

Basketball
- 1922–1924: Baldwin–Wallace
- 1924–1927: Albion

Head coaching record
- Overall: 22–17–4 (football); 56–28 (basketball)

Accomplishments and honors

Championships
- Basketball; 1 MIAA (1927)

Reuben William "Rube" Bechtel (? – 1955) was an American football and basketball coach. He served as the head football coach at Baldwin–Wallace College—now known as Baldwin Wallace University—from 1922 to 1923 and at Albion College from 1924 to 1926, compiling a career college football coaching record of 22–17–4. Bechtel was also the head basketball coach at Baldwin–Wallace from 1922 to 1924 and Albion from 1924 to 1927, tallying a career college basketball coaching mark of 56–28.

Bechtel graduated in 1917 from Wittenberg University in Springfield, Ohio. He died in 1955, in Milwaukie, Oregon.

== Head coaching record ==
=== Football ===
Year	Team	Overall	Conference	Standing	Bowl/playoffs
Baldwin–Wallace Yellow Jackets (Independent) (1922–1923)
1922	Baldwin–Wallace	4–3–1			
1923	Baldwin–Wallace	5–2–1			
Baldwin–Wallace:		9–5–2			
Albion (Michigan Intercollegiate Athletic Association) (1924–1926)
1924	Albion	6–3	4–1	2nd	
1925	Albion	3–4–2	3–1–1	2nd	
1926	Albion	4–5	1–3	T–4th	
Albion:		13–12–2	8–5–1		
Total:		22–17–4			
