= 1962 Michigan Intercollegiate Athletic Association football season =

- League: Michigan Intercollegiate Athletic Association
- Sport: Football
- Number of teams: 6
- Champion: Kalamazoo

Football seasons
- ← 1961 1963 →

1962 Michigan Intercollegiate Athletic Association football standings
	Conf.					Overall
Team	W		L		T	W		L		T
Kalamazoo $	5	–	0	–	0	8	–	0	–	0
Albion	3	–	2	–	0	6	–	2	–	0
Olivet	3	–	2	–	0	6	–	3	–	0
Adrian	3	–	2	–	0	3	–	4	–	0
Hope	1	–	4	–	0	3	–	6	–	0
Alma	0	–	5	–	0	0	–	8	–	0
$ – Conference champion

The 1962 Michigan Intercollegiate Athletic Association football season was the season of college football played by the six member schools of the Michigan Intercollegiate Athletic Association (MIAA) as part of the 1962 NCAA College Division football season.

The Kalamazoo Hornets, in their tenth season under head coach Rolla Anderson, won the MIAA championship with a perfect 8–0 record (5–0 against MIAA opponents). Quarterback Jim Harkema led Kalamazoo with 1,012 yards of total offense.

The defending conference champion Albion had a 15-game winning streak broken on October 20 in a 19–12 loss to Kalamazoo.

The conference's individual statistical leaders included Ed Lauerman of Kalamazoo (489 rushing yards), Mike Knowlton of Alma (732 passing yards), Jon Schoon of Hope (423 receiving yards), and Tom Nesbitt of Olivet (42 points scored).

== Conference overview ==
Conf. rank	Team	Head coach	Conf. record	Overall record	Points scored	Points against
1	Kalamazoo	Rolla Anderson	5–0	8–0	219	81
2 (tie)	Albion	Morley Fraser	3–2	6–2	172	83
2 (tie)	Olivet	Stuart Parsell	3–2	6–3	187	142
2 (tie)	Adrian	Charles Marvin	3–2	3–4	91	153
5	Hope	Russ DeVette	1–4	3–6	155	215
6	Alma	Art Smith	0–5	0–8	64	271

== Teams ==
=== Kalamazoo ===
1962 Kalamazoo Hornets football

MIAA champion
- Conference: Michigan Intercollegiate Athletic Association
- Record: 8–0 (5–0 MIAA)
- Head coach: Rolla Anderson (10th season)
- Home stadium: Angell Field

The 1962 Kalamazoo Hornets football team represented Kalamazoo College of Kalamazoo, Michigan. In their second non-consecutive year under head coach Bob Nulf, the Hornets compiled a perfect 8–0 record (5–0 against MIAA opponents), tied for the MIAA championship, and outscored opponents by a total of 219 to 81. It was Kalamazoo's first MIAA championship in 25 years and the first perfect season since 1916. They also had the only unbeaten and untied record in Michigan during the 1962 season.

Key players included quarterback Jim Harkema, defensive tackle Bob Woodruff, and halfbacks Ed Lauerman and Frank McGeath. Harkema finished the season with 1,012 yards of total offense, only the second player in school history with 1,000 yards.

Date	Opponent	Site	Result	Attendance	Source
September 28	at Eastern Michigan*	Briggs Field; Ypsilanti, MI	W 13–6	3,000	
October 6	Hope	Angell Field; Kalamazoo, MI	W 41–22	1,500	
October 13	at Ferris Institute*	Big Rapids, MI	W 9–7		
October 20	Albion	Angell Field; Kalamazoo, MI	W 19–12		
October 27	at Alma	Alma, MI	W 39–0	4,000	
November 3	Adrian	Angell Field; Kalamazoo, MI	W 44–6		
November 10	at Olivet	Olivet, MI	W 33–21	3,000	
November 17	Augustana (IL)*	Angell Field; Kalamazoo, MI	W 21–7		
*Non-conference game

=== Albion ===
1962 Albion Britons football
- Conference: Michigan Intercollegiate Athletic Association
- Record: 6–2 (3–2 MIAA)
- Head coach: Morley Fraser (9th season)

The 1962 Albion Britons football team represented Albion College of Albion, Michigan. In their ninth year under head coach Morley Fraser, the Britons compiled a 6–2 record (3–2 against MIAA opponents), finished in a tie for second place in the MIAA, and outscored opponents by a total of 172 to 83.

The Britons had a 15-game winning streak dating back to the 1960 season. It was the longest winning streak in Albion school history, eclipsing a 14-game streak during the 1939 and 1940 seasons. The streak was broken on October 20 in a loss to Kalamazoo.

Key players included halfbacks Mike Hornus and Russ Wallis and quarterback Frank Gould.

Date	Opponent	Site	Result	Attendance	Source
September 22	Ohio Northern*	Albion, MI	W 16–8		
September 29	Adrian	Albion, MI	W 19–7	4,000	
October 6	at Alma	Alma, MI	W 28–6		
October 13	at Anderson	Anderson, IN	W 34–0		
October 20	at Kalamazoo	Angell Field; Kalamazoo, MI	L 12–19	1,500	
October 27	Wayne State^{†}*	Albion, MI	W 30–6	4,500	
November 3	at Olivet	Olivet, MI	L 7–15	1,500	
November 10	Hope	Albion, MI	W 26–22	1,500	
*Non-conference game; ^{†}Homecoming

=== Olivet ===
1962 Olivet Comets football
- Conference: Michigan Intercollegiate Athletic Association
- Record: 6–3 (3–2 MIAA)
- Head coach: Stuart Parsell (4th season)

The 1962 Olivet Comets football team represented Olivet College of Olivet, Michigan. In their fourth year under head coach Stuart Parsell, the Comets compiled a 6–3 record (3–2 against MIAA opponents), finished in a tie for second place in the MIAA, and outscored opponents by a total of 187 to 142.

Date	Opponent	Site	Result	Attendance	Source
September 15	Franklin (IN)*	Olivet, MI	W 13–12		
September 22	Indiana Central*	Olivet, MI	W 26–21		
September 29	vs. Northwood Institute*	Charlotte, MI	W 32–6	1,500	
October 6	at Adrian	Adrian, MI	L 14–21		
October 13	at Hope	Riverview Park; Holland, MI	W 19–12	4,500	
October 20	Alma	Olivet, MI	W 33–6	1,000	
October 27	at Grand Rapids JC*	Grand Rapids, MI	L 14–24	3,000	
November 3	Albion	Olivet, MI	W 15–7	1,500	
November 10	Kalamazoo	Olivet, MI	L 21–33	3,000	
*Non-conference game

=== Adrian ===
1962 Adrian Bulldogs football
- Conference: Michigan Intercollegiate Athletic Association
- Record: 3–4 (3–2 MIAA)
- Head coach: Charles Marvin (1st season)

The 1962 Adrian Bulldogs football team represented Adrian College of Adrian, Michigan. In their first year under head coach Charles Marvin, the Bulldogs compiled a 3–4 record (3–2 against MIAA opponents), tied for second place in the MIAA, and were outscored by a total of 153 to 91.

Date	Opponent	Site	Result	Attendance	Source
September 22	at Defiance*	Defiance, OH	L 7–20		
September 29	at Albion	Albion, MI	L 7–19	4,000	
October 6	Olivet	Adrian, MI	W 21–14		
October 13	Alma^{†}	Adrian, MI	W 27–26	3,000	
October 20	Ferris Institute	Adrian, MI	L 0–8		
October 27	Hope	Maple Stadium; Adrian, MI	W 23–2	2,000	
November 3	at Kalamazoo	Kalamazoo, MI	L 6–44		
*Non-conference game; ^{†}Homecoming

=== Hope ===
1962 Hope Flying Dutchmen football
- Conference: Michigan Intercollegiate Athletic Association
- Record: 3–6 (3–2 MIAA)
- Head coach: Russ DeVette (8th season)

The 1962 Hope Flying Dutchmen football team represented Hope College of Hope, Michigan. In their eighth year under head coach Russ DeVette, the Dutchmen compiled a 3–6 record (3–2 against MIAA opponents), finished in fifth place in the MIAA, and were outscored by a total of 215 to 155.

Date	Opponent	Site	Result	Attendance	Source
September 15	Ashland*	Riverview Park; Holland, MI	W 21–14	2,000	
September 22	Valparaiso*	Riverview Park; Holland, MI	L 0–48	4,500	
September 29	at Wheaton*	McCully Field; Wheaton, IL	L 0–31	5,500	
October 6	at Kalamazoo	Kalamazoo, MI	L 22–41	1,500	
October 13	Olivet	Riverview Park; Holland, MI	L 12–19	4,500	
October 20	at Eastern Illinois*	Lincoln Field; Charleston, IL	W 26–7	5,000	
October 27	at Adrian	Maple Stadium; Adrian, MI	L 22–23	2,000	
November 3	Alma	Riverview Park; Holland, MI	W 30–6	2,000	
November 10	at Albion	Albion, MI	L 22–26	1,500	
*Non-conference game

=== Alma ===
1962 Alma Scots football
- Conference: Michigan Intercollegiate Athletic Association
- Record: 0–8 (0–5 MIAA)
- Head coach: Art Smith (7th season)

The 1962 Alma Scots football team represented Alma College of Alma, Michigan. In their seventh and final year under head coach Art Smith, the Scots compiled a 0–8 record (0–5 against MIAA opponents), finished in last place in the MIAA, and were outscored by a total of 271 to 64.

Date	Opponent	Site	Result	Attendance	Source
September 14	at Ohio Northern*	Ada, OH	L 6–52		
September 22	Bluffton*	Alma, MI	L 8–32		
October 6	Albion	Alma, MI	L 6–28		
October 13	at Adrian	Adrian, MI	L 26–27	3,000	
October 20	at Olivet	Olivet, MI	L 6–33	1,000	
October 27	Kalamazoo	Alma, MI	L 0–39		
November 3	at Hope	Riverview Park; Holland, MI	L 6–30	2,000	
November 10	at Eastern Michigan*	Briggs Field; Ypsilanti, MI	L 6–30		
*Non-conference game

== All-conference team ==
After the season, MIAA commissioner announced the All-MIAA football team for 1962. Nine players from Kalamazoo College were named to the first team. The first-team selections were:

Offense

- Backs - Jim Harkema, Kalamazoo; Bryce Fauble, Adrian; Ed Lauerman, Kalamazoo; Tom Nesbitt, Olivet
- Ends - John persons, Kalamazoo; Rob Schoon, Hope
- Tackles - Bob Phillips, Kalamazoo; Ron Mitchell, Olivet
- Guards - Bob Peters, Kalamazoo; Jim Dumont, Adrian
- Centers - Jim Wiegerink, Hope; Bill Cassidy, Olivet

Defense

- Ends - Ray Comeau, Kalamazoo; Dave Barrett, Albion
- Tackles - Tom Smith, Adrian; George Pyne, Olivet
- Middle guard - Jim Jahnke, Kalamazoo
- Linebackers - Jim Nadill, Albion; Bob Powell, Olivet; Tim Hayward, Kalamazoo
- Defensive backs - Dan Christiansen, Albion; Bob Porritt, Albion; Larry Melendy, Olivet
