= Will Carl Rufus =

American astronomer and mathematician

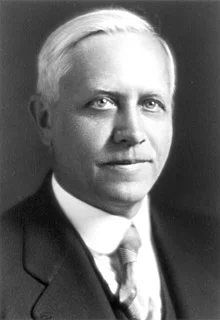
- Will Carl Rufus from the University of Michigan faculty and staff portrait collection.
- Born: July 1, 1876; Chatham, Ontario, Canada
- Died: September 21, 1946 (aged 70); Ann Arbor, Michigan
- Resting place: Forest Hill Cemetery, Ann Arbor, Michigan
- Education: Albion College (A.B.)(M.A.); University of Michigan–Ann Arbor (Ph.D.)
- Spouse: Maude Squire (d. 1946)
- Children: Merlin Q., Howard C., Herman
- Scientific career
- Fields: Astronomy, Mathematics
- Institutions: University of Michigan

Will Carl Rufus (July 1, 1876 – September 21, 1946) was an American astronomer, mathematician, philosopher, poet, administrator and instructor.

== Life ==
Rufus was born in Chatham, Ontario, Canada, on July 1, 1876, to William James and Eliza Ann James. Rufus got his BA and MA from Albion College in 1902 and 1908 respectively. He began teaching mathematics and astronomy in Flint Michigan and Lansing Michigan after studying in Korea. He proceeded to the University of Michigan, where he earned his Doctorate in Astronomy in 1915. While in Korea, he served as University Professor of Mathematics and Astronomy at Union College, Pyeng Yang, Korea, and later Chosen Christian College, Seoul, Korea. He later moved to the University of Michigan in 1917, where he became the acting Director of the Observatory in 1945. He married Maude Rufus (née Squire) on September 29, 1902. He died in his summer home at Crooked Lake on September 21, 1946.

== Contributions ==
Rufus integrated the McMath-Hulbert Observatory and was known for his contributions to the history of astronomy in America. His principal research work in astronomy focused on Asteroseismology, relating to atmospheric circulation in stars of variable density and spectroscopic analysis of the composition of stars. He was one of the earliest research scholars to contribute to the new theory of Cepheid variables stars and in Stellar pulsation.

As a member of the University of Michigan's committee on Barbour scholarships, Rufus aided a large number of women students from East Asian countries.

=== Books ===
Rufus was the editor of Johann Kepler, 1571–1630: A Tercentenary Commemoration of His Life and Work (History of Science Society, 1931).

With Hsing-Chih Tien, he published the book The Soochow Astronomical Chart (University of Michigan, 1945), describing the Suzhou planisphere, a large engraved stone star chart from Song dynasty (13th-century) China.
