= Art Smith (American football) =

American football and basketball coach (1915–2010)

Biographical details
- Born: October 24, 1915; Sault Ste. Marie, Ontario, Canada
- Died: February 24, 2010 (aged 94); Alma, Michigan, U.S.

Playing career

Football
- 1934–1937: Alma

Coaching career (HC unless noted)

Football
- 1939–1940: Alma (freshmen)
- 1941–1942: Three Rivers HS (MI)
- 1946–?: Pontiac HS (MI)
- 1949–?: Boise HS (ID)
- c. 1950: Idaho (assistant)
- 1956–1962: Alma

Basketball
- 1941–1943: Three Rivers HS (MI)
- 1946–?: Pontiac HS (MI)
- 1949–?: Boise HS (ID)
- 1951–1953: Idaho (assistant)
- 1953–1956: Whitworth

Baseball
- 1941–1943: Three Rivers HS (MI)
- 1952–1953: Idaho (assistant)
- 1954–1956: Whitworth

Administrative career (AD unless noted)
- 1956–?: Alma

Head coaching record
- Overall: 21–37–2 (college football); 59–22 (college basketball)

Arthur Louis Smith (October 24, 1915 – February 24, 2010) was an American football and basketball coach. He served as the head football coach at Alma College in Alma, Michigan from 1956 to 1962.

== Head coaching record ==
=== College football ===
| Year | Team | Overall | Conference | Standing | Bowl/playoffs |
|---|---|---|---|---|---|
Alma Scots (Michigan Intercollegiate Athletic Association) (1956–1962)
| 1956 | Alma | 2–7 | 1–5 | 6th | |
| 1957 | Alma | 5–2–2 | 3–2–1 | 4th | |
| 1958 | Alma | 5–3 | 3–3 | 4th | |
| 1959 | Alma | 5–4 | 4–2 | 3rd | |
| 1960 | Alma | 2–7 | 0–5 | 6th | |
| 1961 | Alma | 2–6 | 2–3 | 4th | |
| 1962 | Alma | 0–8 | 0–5 | 6th | |
| Alma: | | 21–37–2 | 13–25–1 | | |
| Total: | | 21–37–2 | | | |
