= Craig Rundle =

American football player and coach (born 1952)

Biographical details
- Born: February 1, 1952 (age 74)
- Education: Albion College (1974)

Playing career
- 1971, 1973: Albion
- Positions: Tight end, defensive lineman

Coaching career (HC unless noted)
- 1976: Central Michigan (assistant)
- 1977–1981: Christian Bros. HS (CA)
- 1982–1984: Wayne State (MI) (assistant)
- 1984–1985: Saint Mary's (DC)
- 1986–1989: Saint Mary's
- 1990–1996: Colorado College
- 1997–2018: Albion

Head coaching record
- Overall: 184–141–1 (college); 29–21–1 (high school)
- Tournaments: 0–5 (NCAA D-III playoffs)

Accomplishments and honors

Championships
- 7 MIAA (1998–1999, 2001, 2005, 2011, 2013, 2015)

Craig Rundle (born February 1, 1952) is an American former football coach. He served as the head football coach at Saint Mary's College of California from 1986 to 1989, and Colorado College from 1990 to 1996, and Albion College from 1997 to 2018, compiling a career college football coaching record of 184–141–1. Rundle led Albion to seven Michigan Intercollegiate Athletic Association (MIAA) titles.

== Albion College (athlete) ==
Rundle graduated from Gabriels High School, which is now part of Lansing Catholic High School. He enrolled at Albion College, where he played at the tight end and defensive line positions for the school's football team. He graduated in 1974 with a bachelor's degree in physical education. He later received a master's degree from Central Michigan University.

== Christian Brothers High School ==
After a one-year stint as an assistant coach at Central Michigan University in 1976, Rundle began his head coaching career at Christian Brothers School ("CBS") in Sacramento, California. He was the head coach at CBS for five years from 1977–1981. In 1981, Rundle led CBS to an 11–2 record and reportedly "stunned the top-ranked [Cordova High School] Lancers" by a score of 24–6 en route to a Metro League title; his 1981 team would go on to win the Sac-Joaqiun Section Title the first in Christian Brothers High School history. In five years at CBS, Rundle's teams compiled a 29–21–1 record.

== Wayne State ==
Rundle left CBS in 1982 to accept a position as the defensive coordinator at Wayne State University in Detroit, Michigan. He held that position from 1982 to 1984.

== Saint Mary's ==
After spending two years as the defensive coordinator at Saint Mary's College in Moraga, California, Rundle was promoted to head coach in March 1986. The Saint Mary's Gaels were 3–8 in 1985, the year before Rundle became head coach. Rundle served four years as the head coach and compiled a record of 29–12. He led the 1988 St. Mary's team to a perfect 10–0 record. Despite being one of only two team in NCAA Division II with an unbeaten, untied record in 1988 (the other was eventual national champion North Dakota State), Rundle's team was unranked and did not receive an invitation to play in the NCAA Division II tournament. The San Francisco Chronicle in November 1988 called the Gaels one of the "better-kept secrets in Division II football."

== Colorado College ==
In February 1990, Rundle was hired as the head coach at Colorado College. He replaced Jerry Carle, who had served as the school's head coach for 33 years. The Colorado College football team had finished the 1989 season with a 1–8 record. Asked about taking over a program that was in a rebuilding phase, Rundle said, "I'm not intimidated about coming into a program that's been down. When I started here at St. Mary's, they weren't that much better. It's going to be a real challenge, but I look forward to it." Rundle explained his decision to make the move as follows, "For raising my family, I found the city of Colorado Springs very appealing. And a Division III program fits my philosophies. I think you'll find Division III programs offer more of a pure sport."

After arriving at Colorado College, Rundle introduced a new, pass-oriented offense. The focal point of the new offense was Rundle's "pro-set, man-in-motion, pass-when-you-can attack." Rundle's first victory at Colorado College was a 38–6 win over Tabor College featuring a passing attack that accounted for 860 yards of offense in the first three games of the 1990 season. After a 63–0 win over Trinity Bible College in late October 1990, the Colorado Springs Gazette-Telegraph referred to the Colorado College offense as "Air Rundle."

Rundle remained at Colorado College for seven seasons from 1990 to 1996 and compiled a seven-year record of 29–33–1. In his first three seasons, his teams finished 4–5, 3–6 and 3–6. However, Rundle turned the program around in 1993, when his team finished with a record of 8–1. The 1993 team opened the season with eight consecutive wins, including consecutive wins over Hardin-Simmons (the No. 4-ranked team in NAIA Division II) and Washington University in St. Louis. However, the team lost the final game of the season by a score of 22–21 against Hastings College, a team that was ranked No. 3 in NAIA Division II. In the loss to Hastings, Colorado College led going into the final minutes when Hastings completed several passes and scored a touchdown for the lead. Years later, Rundle recalled the loss to Hastings, "I still wake up at night sometimes and think about that game. You know, just wondering what if we'd done a few things differently."

Despite the impressive 1993 season, Rundle's team was not invited to play in the Division III playoffs. Rundle told a reporter, "It seems like they might be looking for reasons why we don't belong in the playoffs, instead of why we do. I've called a couple of people on the committee, just trying to enlighten them about our situation. But I'm not sure it's had any effect." Yet, the Colorado Springs Gazette-Telegraph noted, "Rundle, whose priorities and ethics are impeccable, refuses to scream about being victimized by the system."

The day after the season-ending loss to Hastings in 1993, Rundle sought to "break the gloom and doom" by telling his team, "I hadn't had a haircut all season, and if they wanted to give me one, they could." The seniors accepted the offer and "left him with nothing but stubble - and the players with thoughts of all that went right in 1993." The 1993 Colorado College team averaged 38 points a game and allowed 20 points per game, while setting season records for points (344), touchdowns (46), defensive touchdowns (six), points scored by the defense (36) and consecutive victories to start a season (eight).

Despite finishing 4–4–1 and 4–5 in 1994 and 1995, Rundle remained a popular figure in Colorado Springs. In 1996, the Colorado Springs Gazette-Telegraph wrote: "Step into the office of Colorado College football coach Craig Rundle, and you instantly rediscover all's right with the world. Rundle, entering his seventh year at CC, always has made sure his nonscholarship program's priorities remain constant and appropriate."

In his seven years at Colorado College, Rundle became the third-winningest coach in the school's football history behind Jerry Carle and W.T. Van de Graaff. When Rundle announced his decision to leave Colorado College to take the head coaching position at his alma mater, Albion College, a columnist in the Colorado Springs Gazette-Telegraph closed his coverage of the story as follows:

"Craig Rundle is a special person in every way. This job brings us in contact with all kinds of coaches, most of whom go without more than a simple 'good luck, and nice working with you,' as they leave. But for this farewell, it seems appropriate to add something I've never written before. I wish I could have played for you, coach. I really do."

== Albion College (coach) ==
In January 1997, Rundle was hired as the head football coach at Albion College. In his first season at Albion, Rundle's team finished 6-3 but fell short of winning the MIAA championship. However, in 1998, Rundle's Albion finished 8-2, won the MIAA championship, and advanced to the NCAA Division III Playoffs. In his first nine seasons at Albion, Rundle compiled a record of 60-29, won four MIAA championship, and advanced twice to the NCAA Division III playoffs.

In 2001, Albion won an MIAA championship with both of Rundle's sons playing on the team. His oldest son, Travis Rundle, was the team's quarterback and broke many of the school's all-time passing records. Travis held Albion records for the most pass attempts in a season (329 in 2001), most completions in a season (183 in 2001), and as of January 2017 holds the record for most passing touchdowns in a game (six against Olivet College in 2000). Rundle's younger son, Troy Rundle, also played tight end for the 2001 team. Both sons became first-team All-MIAA selections.

Rundle retired at the end of the 2018 season with the most victories (122) of any coach in Albion history, 7 MIAA Championships and 5 NCAA appearances.

In 2024, Rundle was inducted into the Albion Athletics Hall of Fame along with his sons, Travis and Troy.

== Head coaching record ==
=== College ===
Year	Team	Overall	Conference	Standing	Bowl/playoffs
Saint Mary's Gaels (NCAA Division II independent) (1986–1989)
1986	Saint Mary's	5–5			
1987	Saint Mary's	8–3			
1988	Saint Mary's	10–0			
1989	Saint Mary's	6–4			
Saint Mary's:		29–12			
Colorado College Tigers (NCAA Division III independent) (1990–1996)
1990	Colorado College	4–5			
1991	Colorado College	3–6			
1992	Colorado College	3–6			
1993	Colorado College	8–1			
1994	Colorado College	4–4–1			
1995	Colorado College	3–6			
1996	Colorado College	3–6			
Colorado College:		28–34–1			
Albion Britons (Michigan Intercollegiate Athletic Association) (1997–2018)
1997	Albion	6–3	3–2	T–3rd	
1998	Albion	8–2	6–0	1st	L NCAA Division III First Round
1999	Albion	6–3	5–1	T–1st	
2000	Albion	7–3	3–2	T–2nd	
2001	Albion	8–2	5–0	1st	
2002	Albion	5–5	3–3	T–4th	
2003	Albion	6–4	4–2	T–2nd	
2004	Albion	7–3	5–2	T–2nd	
2005	Albion	7–4	6–1	1st	L NCAA Division III First Round
2006	Albion	5–5	3–4	5th	
2007	Albion	2–8	2–5	6th	
2008	Albion	4–6	3–3	T–3rd	
2009	Albion	4–6	4–2	T–2nd	
2010	Albion	5–5	4–2	T–2nd	
2011	Albion	6–5	6–0	1st	L NCAA Division III First Round
2012	Albion	6–4	3–3	4th	
2013	Albion	8–3	6–0	1st	L NCAA Division III First Round
2014	Albion	6–4	4–2	T–2nd	
2015	Albion	9–2	5–1	T–1st	L NCAA Division III First Round
2016	Albion	1–9	0–6	7th	
2017	Albion	4–6	2–4	5th	
2018	Albion	7–3	4–3	T–3rd	
Albion:		127–95	87–48		
Total:		184–141–1			
National championship Conference title Conference division title or championship game berth
