= Les Leggett =

American football player and coach (1927–2011)

Biographical details
- Born: September 3, 1927; Maine, U.S.
- Died: October 14, 2011 (aged 84); Williston, Vermont, U.S.

Playing career

Football
- 1948–1950: Maine

Coaching career (HC unless noted)

Football
- 1956: Whitman (assistant)
- 1957–1958: Portland State
- 1959–1961: Adrian
- 1962–?: Vermont (ends)

Swimming
- 1962–1980: Vermont

Head coaching record
- Overall: 15–25–1 (football)

Leslie R. Leggett (September 3, 1927 – October 14, 2011) was an American football coach. His son Jack Leggett is the long-time head coach for the Clemson Tigers baseball team.

== Football coaching career ==
After graduating from the University of Maine in 1951, Leggett served as a coach at Old Town High School in Old Town, Maine. In 1956, he served as an assistant football coach at Whitman College in Walla Walla, Washington. The following season, he was hired as the head coach at Portland State University.

At Portland State, he held the head coaching position for two seasons, from 1957 until 1958. His coaching record at Portland State was 6–11. He resigned from his position at Portland State in April 1959 to take over as head coach at Adrian.

At Adrian College in Adrian, Michigan, he held the head coaching position for three seasons, from 1959 until 1961. His coaching record at Adrian was 9–14–1. Following his dismissal from Adrian, Leggett served as an assistant for the Vermont Catamounts.

== Other sports ==
In addition to his career as a football coach, Leggett served as a coach for other college sports. At Whitman he served as head baseball coach, and at Adrian he also served as head wrestling and track and field coach from 1960 to 1962. In 1962, Leggett established the swimming and diving program at Vermont and served as its head coach through the 1980 season. During his tenure as head coach the Catamounts had winning records in 16 of his 17 seasons.

== Head coaching record ==
=== Football ===
Year	Team	Overall	Conference	Standing	Bowl/playoffs
Portland State Vikings (Oregon Collegiate Conference) (1957–1958)
1957	Portland State	2–6	1–3	4th	
1958	Portland State	4–5	2–2	3rd	
Portland State:		6–11	3–5		
Adrian Bulldogs (Michigan Intercollegiate Athletic Association) (1959–1961)
1959	Adrian	2–6	1–5	T–5th	
1960	Adrian	5–2–1	3–2	3rd	
1961	Adrian	2–6	1–5	5th	
Adrian:		9–14–1	5–12		
Total:		15–25–1			
