= Geoffery Merszei =

Canadian businessman (born 1951)

Geoffery E. Merszei (born 30 August 1951) is a Canadian businessman. His career was primarily at the Dow Chemical Company, which he joined in 1977 and stayed with until his retirement in 2013, apart from a 4-year stint at Alcan (2001–2005).

== Biography ==
Geoffery Merszei was born in Toronto, to Zoltan Merszei, who served as Dow President and CEO until his retirement in 1979. He attended Albion College in Albion, Michigan, where he graduated with a bachelor's degree in economics.

He started his career at the Royal Bank of Canada. In 1977, he joined Dow Chemical and over 24 years, worked in Geneva, Switzerland, Hong Kong, Frankfurt, Horgen and the corporate headquarters in Midland, Michigan. He resigned in 2001 to become Executive Vice President and Chief Financial Officer of Alcan, Inc. He returned to Dow in July 2005 as Executive Vice President and Chief Financial Officer.

He served on the Board of Directors of Dow Chemical from 2005 to 2009. He represents Dow Chemical for the Cefic. He has served on the Board of Directors of Union Carbide, a subsidiary of Dow Chemical since 2001, and as chairman and Director of Liana Limited and the Dorinco Reinsurance Company. He is a member of The Conference Board Committee of the Council of Financial Executives and a member of the Corporate Executive Board Working Council for Chief Financial Officers. He has served on the executive committee of the United States Council for International Business.
