= Moose Scheib =

American businessman (born 1980)

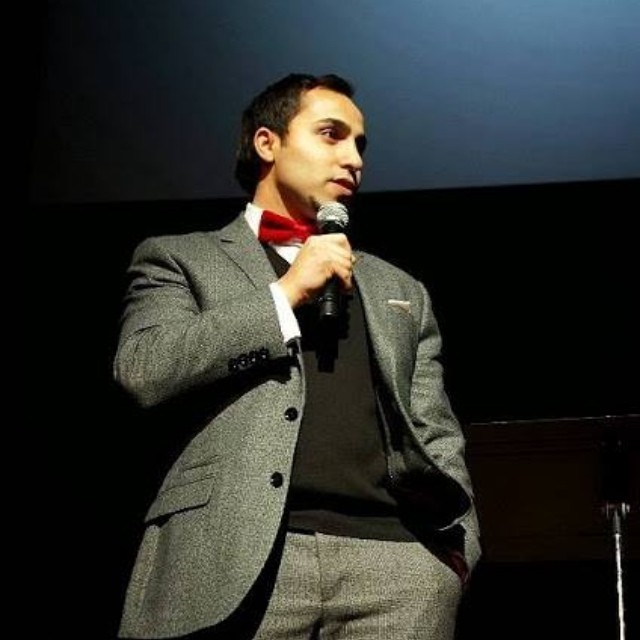
Moose Scheib speaking.

Moose M. Scheib (born June 21, 1980) is a Lebanese-born American attorney, television producer, and real estate specialist. He was the CEO of CBIG, a firm set up to market EB-5 visas (which allow international investors to obtain a US green card by investing in US companies), to Middle East investors.

== Early life and education ==
Scheib was born in Beirut, Lebanon during the Lebanese Civil War, the son of a newspaper editor and government official. His family immigrated to the U.S. (Toledo, Ohio) when he was seven years old and eventually settled in Dearborn, Michigan. When Scheib was twelve, his father – who sought work as a truck driver to keep the family afloat – suffered the first in a series of strokes. As a result, his mother began work at a metro-Detroit restaurant and Scheib began working and caring for his ill father and siblings.

Scheib graduated from Dearborn High School in 1998. He received a Bachelor of Arts in Economics & Management from Albion College and a Juris Doctor from Columbia Law School.

== Career ==
In 2007, Scheib's company, Mizna, began renegotiating mortgages to help homeowners and lenders avoid foreclosure. By September 2008, the company, which sourced 10% of its clients from the loanmod.com website Scheib bought in 2007, had renegotiated over 5,000 mortgages.

Scheib founded Mizna Entertainment, which produced the Arab American Comedy Show in 2007, 2008, and 2009, and viral MTV spoof videos that include Arab CRIBS, Nexted, and Made.

== Community service and awards ==
Scheib received the 2004 Arab American Institute Raymond Jallow Award for Public Service and the 2010 Arabian Business Magazine 30 under 30 Award for the Next Generation of Arab Leaders. He is also co-founder and former board chairman of the National Arab Orchestra.

== See also ==
- History of the Middle Eastern people in Metro Detroit
