= Russ DeVette =

American football, basketball and baseball player and coach

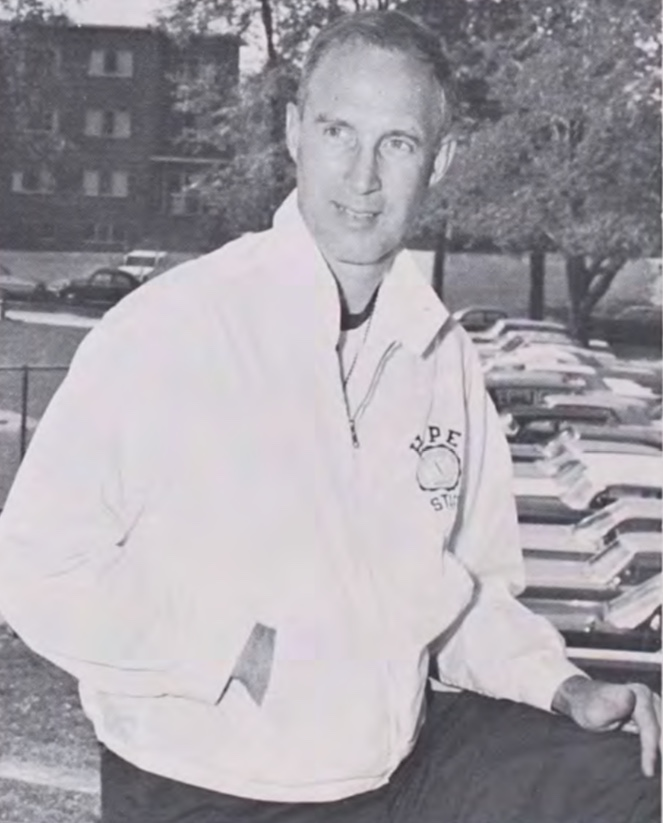
- DeVette from the 1967 Milestone

Biographical details
- Born: July 9, 1923
- Died: November 23, 2009 (aged 86)

Playing career

Basketball
- 1943–1944: Denison
- 1946–1947: Hope
- 1948–1950: Holland Hurricanes
- 1950–1951: Grand Rapids Hornets

Coaching career (HC unless noted)

Football
- 1955–1969: Hope

Basketball
- 1948–1951: Hope
- 1956–1977: Hope

Baseball
- 1952–1954: Hope
- 1956–1961: Hope

Women's track and field
- 1983–1988: Hope

Head coaching record
- Overall: 62–64–1 (football); 329–221 (basketball); 72–43–1 (baseball)

Accomplishments and honors

Championships
- Football; 2 MIAA (1958, 1963)

Russell Bernard DeVette (July 9, 1923 – November 23, 2009) was an American football, basketball and baseball player and coach. He served as the head basketball coach at Hope College in Holland, Michigan, from 1948 to 1951 and from 1956 to 1977.

== Head coaching record ==
=== Football ===
Year	Team	Overall	Conference	Standing	Bowl/playoffs
Hope Flying Dutchmen (Michigan Intercollegiate Athletic Association) (1955–1969)
1955	Hope	4–5	3–3	T–3rd	
1956	Hope	4–4	4–2	3rd	
1957	Hope	7–2	4–2	T–2nd	
1958	Hope	8–1	5–1	T–1st	
1959	Hope	8–1	5–1	2nd	
1960	Hope	5–4	4–1	2nd	
1961	Hope	0–7	0–5	6th	
1962	Hope	3–6	1–5	5th	
1963	Hope	5–4	4–1	1st	
1964	Hope	2–6	1–4	T–4th	
1965	Hope	4–4	3–2	T–2nd	
1966	Hope	3–4	2–3	T–4th	
1967	Hope	2–6	1–3	4th	
1968	Hope	4–5	2–3	T–3rd	
1969	Hope	3–5–1	2–3	4th	
Hope:		62–64–1	41–39		
Total:		62–64–1			
National championship Conference title Conference division title or championship game berth
