= Morley Fraser =

American football and baseball coach (1922–2004)

Biographical details
- Born: June 15, 1922; Milwaukee, Wisconsin, U.S.
- Died: June 28, 2004 (aged 82); Albion, Michigan, U.S.

Coaching career (HC unless noted)

Football
- 1949–1951: Newberry HS (MI)
- 1952–1953: Eastern HS (MI)
- 1954–1968: Albion

Head coaching record
- Overall: 81–41–1 (college football)

Accomplishments and honors

Championships
- Football; 6 MIAA (1958, 1960–1961, 1964–1966)

Henry Morley Fraser (June 15, 1922 – June 28, 2004) was an American football and baseball coach. He was served as the head football coach at Albion College from 1954 to 1968. Fraser died from leukemia in June 2004 at age 82. Fraser's overall record in 15 years as a college football head coach is 81–41–1.

Morley served as a captain in the United States Navy during World War II. He was a native of Milwaukee, Wisconsin, and a graduate of Washburn University in Topeka, Kansas, and Michigan State University in East Lansing, Michigan. Morley began his coaching career in 1949 at Newberry High School in Newberry, Michigan. After three consecutive undefeated seasons at Newberry, he moved to Eastern High School in Lansing Michigan, where he stayed for two seasons before he was hired at Albion.

He became a motivational speaker after retiring as Albion's football coach.

== Head coaching record ==
=== College football ===
Year	Team	Overall	Conference	Standing	Bowl/playoffs
Albion Britons (Michigan Intercollegiate Athletic Association) (1954–1968)
1954	Albion	5–3	4–2	T–2nd	
1955	Albion	3–5	3–3	T–3rd	
1956	Albion	3–5	3–3	4th	
1957	Albion	5–3	4–2	T–2nd	
1958	Albion	6–2	5–1	T–1st	
1959	Albion	4–4	3–3	4th	
1960	Albion	7–1	5–0	1st	
1961	Albion	8–0	5–0	1st	
1962	Albion	6–2	3–2	T–2nd	
1963	Albion	5–4	3–2	T–3rd	
1964	Albion	8–0	5–0	1st	
1965	Albion	7–2	5–0	1st	
1966	Albion	6–2	4–1	1st	
1967	Albion	2–5–1	2–2	3rd	
1968	Albion	6–3	4–1	2nd	
Albion:		81–41–1	58–22		
Total:		81–41–1			
National championship Conference title Conference division title or championship game berth
