= 1980 Michigan Intercollegiate Athletic Association football season =

- League: Michigan Intercollegiate Athletic Association
- Sport: Football
- Teams: 6
- Champion: Adrian

Football seasons

1980 Michigan Intercollegiate Athletic Association football standings
	Conf.					Overall
Team	W		L		T	W		L		T
Adrian $	5	–	0	–	0	9	–	0	–	0
Hope	4	–	1	–	0	4	–	5	–	0
Albion	2	–	3	–	0	5	–	4	–	0
Olivet	2	–	3	–	0	2	–	6	–	0
Kalamazoo	1	–	4	–	0	3	–	5	–	0
Alma	1	–	4	–	0	2	–	7	–	0
$ – Conference champion

The 1980 Michigan Intercollegiate Athletic Association football season was the season of college football played by the six member schools of the Michigan Intercollegiate Athletic Association (MIAA) as part of the 1980 NCAA Division III football season.

The Adrian Bulldogs, in their eighth season under head coach Tom Heckert Sr., won the MIAA championship with a perfect 9–0 record, including a 5–0 mark against MIAA opponents.

== Conference overview ==
Conf. rank	Team	Head coach	Conf. record	Overall record	Points scored	Points against	Passing avg	Rushing avg	Opp pass avg	Opp rush avg
1	Adrian	Tom Heckert Sr.	5–0	9–0	289	81	68.2	278.8	133.8	92.4
2	Hope	Ray Smith	4–1	4–5	168	170	135.0	165.2	156.6	128.0
3 (tie)	Albion	Frank Joranko	2–3	5–4	138	138	113.4	164.6	137.4	97.0
3 (tie)	Olivet	Ron Lynch	2–3	3–6	150	219	182.4	135.6	162.8	170.0
5 (tie)	Kalamazoo	Ed Baker	1–4	3–5	109	171	180.6	97.0	152.8	173.2
5 (tie)	Alma	Phil Brooks	1–4	2–7	116	174	189.2	49.2	123.4	224.2

== All-conference team and statistical leaders ==
The following players were selected as first-team players on the 1980 All-MIAA football team:

- Running back - Scott Thompson, Albion
- Wide receiver - Brad Boyer
- Defensive lineman - Marty Maher, Albion
- Middle guard - Ray Moran, Adrian (also selected as MIAA MVP)
- Linebacker - Tim Carlson
- Defensive back - Eric Tarpinian, Albion
- Kicker - Mike Doctor, Albion
- Punter - John Massab, Albion

The conference's statistical leaders included:

- Rushing - Tim Fogg, Adrian, 637 yards
- Passing - Tom Ranville, Kalamazoo, 910 yards
- Receiving - Brad Boyer, Alma, 483 yards
- Total offense - Tom Ranville, Kalamazoo, 807 yards
- Scoring - Tim Fogg, Adrian, 66 points
- Interceptions - Joe Sabatella, Olivet, 3 for 67 yards

== Teams ==
=== Adrian ===
1980 Adrian Bulldogs football

MIAA champion
- Conference: Michigan Intercollegiate Athletic Association
- Record: 9–0 (5–0 MIAA)
- Head coach: Tom Heckert Sr. (8th season)

The 1980 Adrian Bulldogs football team represented Adrian College of Adrian, Michigan, in the 1980 NCAA Division III football season. In their eighth year under head coach Tom Heckert Sr., the Bulldogs compiled a perfect 9–0 record (5–0 against MIAA opponents) and won the MIAA championship. It was the first perfect season in Albion football history (the 1911 team went 8–0–1), and its first MIAA championship since 1972.

Date	Opponent	Site	Result	Attendance	Source
September 6	at Denison*	Granville, OH	W 42–21	3,000	
September 13	Defiance*	Adrian, MI	W 41–7	1,500	
September 20	Manchester (IN)*	Adrian, MI	W 42–0	3,000	
September 27	at Geneva*	Beaver Falls, PA	W 25–14	1,000	
October 4	at Alma	Alma, MI	W 31–3	2,500	
October 11	at Albion	Albion, MI	W 17–12	2,000	
October 18	Hope	Adrian, MI	W 35–21	4,000	
October 25	at Olivet	Olivet, MI	W 28–0	2,500	
November 1	Kalamazoo	Adrian, MI	W 28–3	4,000	
*Non-conference game

=== Hope ===
1980 Hope Flying Dutchmen football
- Conference: Michigan Intercollegiate Athletic Association
- Record: 4–5 (4–1 MIAA)
- Head coach: Ray Smith (11th season)

The 1980 Hope Flying Dutchmen football team represented Hope College of Hope, Michigan. In their 11th year under head coach Ray Smith, the Dutchmen compiled a 4–5 record (4–1 against MIAA opponents), finished in second place in the MIAA, and were outscored opponents by a total of 170 to 168.

Date	Opponent	Site	Result	Attendance	Source
September 6	Grand Valley State*	Holland, MI	L 7–14	6,308	
September 13	at Wabash*	Crawfordsville, IN	L 14–44		
September 20	DePauw*	Holland, MI	L 7–10		
September 27	at Franklin (IN)*	Franklin, IN	L 14–19		
October 4	Kalamazoo	Holland, MI	W 27–14		
October 11	at Adrian	Adrian, MI	L 21–35		
October 18	at Alma	Alma, MMI	W 23–6		
October 25	at Albion	Albion, MI	W 14–0		
November 1	Olivet	Olivet, MI	W 41–28		
*Non-conference game

=== Albion ===
1980 Albion Britons football
- Conference: Michigan Intercollegiate Athletic Association
- Record: 5–4 (2–3 MIAA)
- Head coach: Frank Joranko (8th season)

The 1980 Albion Britons football team represented Albion College of Albion, Michigan. In their eighth year under head coach Frank Joranko, the Britons compiled a 5–4 record (2–3 against MIAA opponents), tied for third place in the MIAA, scored 138 points, and gave up 138 points.

Date	Opponent	Site	Result	Attendance	Source
September 6	Ripon*	Albion, MI	W 16–0		
September 13	at Allegheny*	Meadville, PA	W 21–14		
September 20	Valparaiso*	Albion, MI	W 22–16		
September 27	at DePauw*	Greencastle, IN	L 6–35		
October 4	Olivet	Albion, MI	W 40–23		
October 11	at Kalamazoo	Kalamazoo, MI	W 14–7	2,000	
October 18	Adrian	Albion, MI	L 12–17		
October 25	at Hope	Holland, MI	L 0–14		
November 1	at Alma	Alma, MI	L 7–12		
*Non-conference game

=== Olivet ===
1980 Olivet Comets football
- Conference: Michigan Intercollegiate Athletic Association
- Record: 3–6 (2–3 MIAA)
- Head coach: Ron Lynch (1st season)

The 1980 Olivet Comets football team represented Olivet College of Olivet, Michigan. In their first year under head coach Ron Lynch, the Comets compiled a 3–6 record (2–3 against MIAA opponents), tied for third place in the MIAA, and were outscored by a total of 219 to 50.

Date	Opponent	Site	Result	Attendance	Source
September 6	Franklin (IN)*	Olivet, MI	L 12–28		
September 13	Carthage*	Kenosha, WI	L 6–31		
September 20	at Saint Joseph's (IN)*	Rensselaer, IN	L 7–14		
September 27	Grand Rapids JC*	Olivet, MI	W 10–6		
October 4	at Albion	Albion, MI	L 23–40		
October 11	Alma	Olivet, MI	W 34–24	2,500	
October 18	Kalamazoo	Kalamazoo, MI	W 30–7		
October 25	Adrian	Olivet, MI	L 0–28		
November 1	Hope	Olivet, MI	L 28–41		
*Non-conference game

=== Kalamazoo ===
1980 Kalamazoo Hornets football
- Conference: Michigan Intercollegiate Athletic Association
- Record: 3–5 (1–4 MIAA)
- Head coach: Bob Kent (1st season)
- Home stadium: Angell Field

The 1980 Kalamazoo Hornets football team represented Kalamazoo College of Kalamazoo, Michigan. In their first year under head coach Ed Baker, the Hornets compiled a 3–5 record (1–4 against MIAA opponents), finished in a tie for fifth place in the MIAA, and were outscored by a total of 171 to 109.

Date	Opponent	Site	Result	Attendance	Source
September 13	Grand Rapids JC*	Kalamazoo, MI	W 23–14		
September 20	Illinois College*	Kalamazoo, MI	W 34–2		
September 27	Wabash*	Kalamazoo, MI	L 7–43		
October 4	at Hope	Holland, MI	L 14–27		
October 11	Albion	Kalamazoo, MI	L 7–14	2,000	
October 18	at Olivet	Olivet, MI	L 7–30		
October 25	Alma	Kalamazoo, MI	W 14–13		
November 1	at Adrian	Adrian, MI	L 3–28	4,000	
*Non-conference game

=== Alma ===
1980 Alma Scots football
- Conference: Michigan Intercollegiate Athletic Association
- Record: 2–7 (1–4 MIAA)
- Head coach: Phil Brooks (10th season)

The 1980 Alma Scots football team represented Alma College of Alma, Michigan. In their 10th year under head coach Phil Brooks, the Scots compiled a 2–7 record (1–4 against MIAA opponents), tied for fifth place in the MIAA, and were outscored by a total of 174 to 116.

Date	Opponent	Site	Result	Attendance	Source
September 6	Grand Rapids JC*	Alma, MI	L 13–20		
September 13	at Illinois College*	Jacksonville, IL	W 19–7		
September 20	vs. Michigan Tech*	Pontiac Silverdome; Pontiac, MI (Michigan Dome Classic)	L 10–14		
September 27	at Ferris State*	Big Rapids, MI	L 16–24		
October 4	Adrian	Alma, MI	L 3–31		
October 11	at Olivet	Olivet, MI	L 24–34	2,500	
October 18	Hope	Alma, MI	L 6–23		
October 25	at Kalamazoo	Kalamazoo, MI	L 13–14		
November 1	Albion	Alma, MI	W 12–7		
*Non-conference game
