= 1984 Michigan Intercollegiate Athletic Association football season =

- League: Michigan Intercollegiate Athletic Association
- Sport: Football
- Teams: 6
- Champion: Hope

Football seasons

1984 Michigan Intercollegiate Athletic Association football standings
	Conf.					Overall
Team	W		L		T	W		L		T
Hope $	5	–	0	–	0	9	–	0	–	0
Alma	4	–	1	–	0	6	–	3	–	0
Albion	3	–	2	–	0	5	–	4	–	0
Adrian	2	–	3	–	0	5	–	4	–	0
Olivet	1	–	4	–	0	1	–	8	–	0
Kalamazoo	0	–	5	–	0	1	–	8	–	0
$ – Conference champion

The 1984 Michigan Intercollegiate Athletic Association football season was the season of college football played by the six member schools of the Michigan Intercollegiate Athletic Association (MIAA) as part of the 1984 NCAA Division III football season.

The Hope Flying Dutchmen, in their 15th season under head coach Ray Smith, won the MIAA championship with a perfect 9–0 record, including a 5–0 mark against MIAA opponents.

The conference's statistical leaders (in MIAA games only) included Dean Ulrich of Alma (1,173 yards of total offense), Greg Heeres of Hope (1,157 passing yards), Mark Konechy of Alma (587 rushing yards and 54 points scored), and Al Goetz of Alma (509 receiving yards).

== Conference overview ==
Conf. rank	Team	Head coach	Conf. record	Overall record	Points scored	Points against
1	Hope	Ray Smith	5–0	9–0	363	116
2	Alma	Phil Brooks	4–1	6–3	358	206
3	Albion	Pete Schmidt	3–2	5–4	138	198
4	Adrian	Ron Labadie	2–3	5–4	270	181
5	Olivet	Glen Stevenson	1–4	1–8	90	394
6	Kalamazoo	Bob Kent	0–5	1–8	110	288

== Teams ==
=== Hope ===
1984 Hope Flying Dutchmen football

MIAA champion
- Conference: Michigan Intercollegiate Athletic Association
- Record: 9–0 (5–0 MIAA)
- Head coach: Ray Smith (15th season)

The 1984 Hope Flying Dutchmen football team represented Hope College of Hope, Michigan. In their 15th year under head coach Ray Smith, the Dutchmen compiled a 9–0 record (5–0 against MIAA opponents), won the MIAA championship, and outscored opponents by a total of 363 to 116. The team led the nation in scoring offense with an average of 40.3 points per game. It is the only Hope football team to compile a perfect season.

Despite being ranked No. 8 in the final Division III poll, Hope was not included in the eight teams invited to the Division III playoffs.

Hope was the first college or university in Michigan to field undefeated teams in both football and basketball in the same season. The basketball team compiled a 22–0 record.

Date	Opponent	Site	Result	Attendance	Source
September 8	at Olivet Nazarene*	Bourbonnais, IL	W 41–7		
September 15	DePauw*	Holland, MI	W 34–26		
September 22	at Carthage*	Kenosha, WI	W 54–7		
September 29	Wabash*	Holland, MI	W 34–24		
October 6	Albion	Holland, MI	W 28–6		
October 13	at Kalamazoo	Kalamazoo, MI	W 45–0		
October 20	Adrian	Holland, MI	W 38–17		
October 27	at Alma	Alma, MI	W 34–29		
November 3	Olivet	Holland, MI	W 55–0		
*Non-conference game

=== Alma ===
1984 Alma Scots football
- Conference: Michigan Intercollegiate Athletic Association
- Record: 6–3 (4–1 MIAA)
- Head coach: Phil Brooks (14th season)

The 1984 Alma Scots football team represented Alma College of Alma, Michigan. In their 14th and final year under head coach Phil Brooks, the Scots compiled a 6–3 record (4–1 against MIAA opponents), finished in second place in the MIAA, and outscored opponents by a total of 358 to 206.

Date	Opponent	Site	Result	Attendance	Source
September 8	at Taylor*	Upland, IN	W 41–17		
September 15	Valparaiso*	Alma, MI	L 24–26		
September 22	at Northeastern Illinois*	Chicago, IL	L 24–26		
September 29	Olivet Nazarene*	Alma, MI	W 61–30		
October 6	at Adrian	Adrian, MI	W 27–14		
October 13	Olivet	Alma, MI	W 48–14		
October 20	at Kalamazoo	Kalamazoo, MI	W 52–25		
October 27	Hope	Alma, MI	L 29–34		
November 2	at Albion	Albion, MI	W 52–20		
*Non-conference game

=== Albion ===
1984 Albion Britons football
- Conference: Michigan Intercollegiate Athletic Association
- Record: 5–4 (3–2 MIAA)
- Head coach: Pete Schmidt (2nd season)

The 1984 Albion Britons football team represented Albion College of Albion, Michigan. In their second year under head coach Pete Schmidt, the Britons compiled a 5–4 record (3–2 against MIAA opponents), finished in third place in the MIAA, and were outscored by a total of 198 to 138.

Date	Opponent	Site	Result	Attendance	Source
September 8	Wayne State*	Albion, MI	W 29–28		
September 15	Ohio Wesleyan*	Albion, MI	W 20–10		
September 22	at Wabash*	Crawfordsville, IN	L 7–36		
September 29	at DePauw*	Greencastle, IN	L 6–21		
October 6	at Hope	Holland, MI	L 6–28		
October 13	Adrian	Albion, MI	W 20–7		
October 20	at Olivet	Olivet, MI	W 20–7		
October 27	Kalamazoo	Albion, MI	W 10–9		
November 2	Alma	Albion, MI	L 20–52		
*Non-conference game

=== Adrian ===
1984 Adrian Bulldogs football
- Conference: Michigan Intercollegiate Athletic Association
- Record: 5–4 (2–3 MIAA)
- Head coach: Ron Labadie (3rd season)

The 1984 Adrian Bulldogs football team represented Adrian College of Adrian, Michigan. In their third year under head coach Ron Labadie, the Bulldogs compiled a 5–4 record (2–3 against MIAA opponents), finished in fourth place in the MIAA, and outscored opponents by a total of 270 to 181.

Date	Opponent	Site	Result	Attendance	Source
September 8	at Kenyon*	Gambier, OH	L 23–30		
September 15	Heidelberg*	Adrian, MI	W 46–27		
September 22	at Ohio Northern*	Ada, OH	W 35–12		
September 29	Mount Union*	Adrian, MI	W 31–27		
October 6	Alma	Adrian, MI	L 14–27		
October 13	at Albion	Albion, MI	L 7–20		
October 20	at Hope	Holland, MI	L 17–38		
October 27	Olivet	Adrian, MI	W 66–0		
November 3	at Kalamazoo	Kalamazoo, MI	W 31–0		
*Non-conference game

=== Olivet ===
1984 Olivet Comets football
- Conference: Michigan Intercollegiate Athletic Association
- Record: 1–8 (1–4 MIAA)
- Head coach: Glen Stevenson (3rd season)

The 1984 Olivet Comets football team represented Olivet College of Olivet, Michigan. In their third year under head coach Glen Stevenson, the Comets compiled a 1–8 record (1–4 against MIAA opponents), finished in fifth place in the MIAA, and were outscored by a total of 394 to 90.

Date	Opponent	Site	Result	Attendance	Source
September 8	Union City		L 0–3		
September 15	Wabash	Olivet, MI	L 7–38		
September 22	at Defiance	Defiance, OH	L 14–24		
September 29	Dayton*	Olivet, MI	L 0–59		
October 6	Kalamazoo	Olivet, MI	W 48–27		
October 13	at Alma	Alma, MI	L 14–48		
October 20	Albion	Olivet, MI	L 7–20		
October 27	at Adrian	Adrian, MI	L 0–66		
November 3	at Hope	Holland, MI	L 0–55		
*Non-conference game

=== Kalamazoo ===
1984 Kalamazoo Hornets football
- Conference: Michigan Intercollegiate Athletic Association
- Record: 1–8 (0–5 MIAA)
- Head coach: Bob Kent (1st season)
- Home stadium: Angell Field

The 1984 Kalamazoo Hornets football team represented Kalamazoo College of Kalamazoo, Michigan. In their first year under head coach Bob Kent, the Hornets compiled a 1–8 record (0–5 against MIAA opponents), finished in last place in the MIAA, and were outscored by a total of 288 to 110.

Date	Opponent	Site	Result	Attendance	Source
September 8	at Ferris State*	Big Rapids, MI	L 5–6		
September 15	at Denison*	Granville, OH	L 21–62		
September 22	at Benedictine*	Lisle, IL	W 13–8		
September 29	Oberlin*	Kalamazoo, MI	L 10–26		
October 6	at Olivet	Olivet, MI	L 27–48		
October 13	Hope	Kalamazoo, MI	L 0–45		
October 20	Alma	Kalamazoo, MI	L 25–42		
October 27	at Albion	Albion, MI	L 9–10		
November 3	Adrian	Kalamazoo, MI	L 0–31		
*Non-conference game
