= Bob Bayer =

American football coach and player

Coaching career (HC unless noted)
- 1975–1986: St. John Fisher

Head coaching record
- Overall: 81–30–2

Accomplishments and honors

Awards
- St. John Fisher Hall of Fame (1993)

Bob Bayer is a retired American football coach and player. He was the head coach at St. John Fisher College from 1975 to 1986.

== Head coaching record ==
Year	Team	Overall	Conference	Standing	Bowl/playoffs
St. John Fisher Cardinals (Independent) (1975–1986)
1975	St. John Fisher	1–6			
1976	St. John Fisher	6–2			
1977	St. John Fisher	4–3–1			
1978	St. John Fisher	5–3–1			
1979	St. John Fisher	5–3			
1980	St. John Fisher	6–3			
1981	St. John Fisher	10–2			
1982	St. John Fisher	6–2			
1983	St. John Fisher	9–1			
1984	St. John Fisher	10–1			
1985	St. John Fisher	9–2			
1986	St. John Fisher	10–2			
St. John Fisher:		81–30–2			
Total:		81–30–2			
