= Ron Labadie =

American football player, coach, and scout (born 1949)

Biographical details
- Born: April 7, 1949 (age 77)

Playing career
- 1968–1970: Adrian

Coaching career (HC unless noted)
- 1974–1981: Marshall HS (MI)
- 1982–1989: Adrian

Administrative career (AD unless noted)
- 1985–1989: Adrian
- 1990–present: Miami Dolphins (scout)

Head coaching record
- Overall: 53–21 (college); 42–30 (high school)
- Tournaments: 0–2 (NCAA D-III playoffs)

Accomplishments and honors

Championships
- 3 MIAA (1983, 1988–1989)

Ron Labadie (born April 7, 1949) is an American football scout and former player and coach. He has been a scout for the Miami Dolphins of the National Football League (NFL) since 1990. Labadie was the head football coach at Adrian College in Adrian, Michigan for eight seasons, from 1982 to 1989, compiling a record of 53–21.

== Head coaching record ==
=== College ===
Year	Team	Overall	Conference	Standing	Bowl/playoffs
Adrian Bulldogs (Michigan Intercollegiate Athletic Association) (1982–1989)
1982	Adrian	7–2	3–2	2nd	
1983	Adrian	8–2	5–0	1st	L NCAA Division III Quarterfinal
1984	Adrian	5–4	2–3	T–4th	
1985	Adrian	6–3	4–1	2nd	
1986	Adrian	8–1	4–1	2nd	
1987	Adrian	7–2	4–1	2nd	
1988	Adrian	7–3	4–1	T–1st	L NCAA Division III First Round
1989	Adrian	5–4	4–1	T–1st	
Adrian:		53–21	30–10		
Total:		53–21			
National championship Conference title Conference division title or championship game berth
