= Robert Kent =

Robert Kent may refer to:

- Robert E. Kent (1911–1984), American film writer and film producer
- Robert F. Kent (1911–1982), American lawyer and politician in Pennsylvania
- Robert Craig Kent (1828–1905), attorney and political figure from the Commonwealth of Virginia
- Robert Kent (actor) (1908–1955), American actor
- Robert Kent (quarterback) (born 1980), American football player
- Robert John Kent (1835–1893), lawyer and politician in Newfoundland
- Robert Thurston Kent (1880–1947), American mechanical engineer
- Murder of Bobby Kent (1973–1993), Iranian-American man murdered by seven people
- Ralph S. Kent (1878–1949), mistakenly named Robert, American football coach
- Bob Kent (born 1942), American football coach

== See also ==
- Robert Kent Gooch (1893–1982), American football player
