= 1976 Albion Britons football team =

American college football season

1976 Albion Britons football

MIAA champion
- Conference: Michigan Intercollegiate Athletic Association
- Record: 9–0 (5–0 MIAA)
- Head coach: Frank Joranko (4th season)
- Captain: Rick Otis
- Home stadium: Sprankle-Sprandel Stadium

1976 Michigan Intercollegiate Athletic Association football standings
	Conf.					Overall
Team	W		L		T	W		L		T
Albion $	5	–	0	–	0	9	–	0	–	0
Hope	4	–	1	–	0	6	–	3	–	0
Alma	3	–	2	–	0	5	–	4	–	0
Kalamazoo	2	–	3	–	0	3	–	4	–	1
Adrian	1	–	4	–	0	3	–	6	–	0
Olivet	0	–	5	–	0	0	–	9	–	0
$ – Conference champion

The 1976 Albion Britons football team was an American football team that represented Albion College as a member of the Michigan Intercollegiate Athletic Association (MIAA) during the 1976 NCAA Division III football season. In their fourth season under head coach Frank Joranko, the Britons compiled a perfect 9–0 record (5–0 against MIAA members), won the MIAA championship, shut out five of nine opponents, and outscored all opponents by a total of 272 to 49. It was the fifth unbeaten season in the history of Albion's football program, with prior unbeaten seasons in 1928, 1961, 1964, and 1969.

The Britons were ranked No. 3 in Division III at the end of the regular season. They also ranked first in Division III in rushing offense, total defense, and scoring defense, fourth in total offense, and third in rushing defense. They were unable to participate in the NCAA Division III championship tournament due to an MIAA rule prohibiting post-season play.

Albion players took 10 of 22 first-team spots on the 1976 MIAA All-League team. The Albion honorees were: quarterback Steve Robb (37 of 72 passes for 565 yards and seven touchdowns); fullback Kevin Nixon (596 rushing yards and nine touchdowns); offensive lineman Kevin Schaefer; center Ron Vanderlinden; defensive end and team captain Rick Otis; defensive linemen Jim Haskins and Steve Spencer; linebackers Fred Cromie and Frank Carr; and defensive back Dave Abbott.

The team played its home games at Sprankle-Sprandel Stadium in Albion, Michigan.

== Schedule ==
Date	Opponent	Site	Result	Attendance	Source
September 11	Defiance*	Sprankle-Sprandel Stadium; Albion, MI	W 38–0	2,208	
September 18	at Mount Union*	Alliance, OH	W 27–0	4,500	
September 25	Wabash*	Sprankle-Sprandel Stadium; Albion, MI	W 36–0	1,873–3,180	
October 2	at Alma	Bahlke Field; Alma, MI	W 16–7	2,000–5,500	
October 9	at Adrian	Adrian, MI	W 20–19	5,400	
October 16	Kalamazoo^{†}	Sprankle-Sprandel Stadium; Albion, MI	W 28–0	3,000–6,340	
October 23	Olivet	Sprankle-Sprandel Stadium; Albion, MI	W 55–6	3,190	
October 30	at Hope	Holland, MI	W 14–3	6,734	
November 6	Lakeland*	Sprankle-Sprandel Stadium; Albion, MI	W 49–14	3,284	
*Non-conference game; ^{†}Homecoming
