= Phil Brooks (American football) =

American football coach (born 1937)

Biographical details
- Born: December 30, 1937 (age 88); Owosso, Michigan, U.S.

Coaching career (HC unless noted)
- 1960–1961: Corunna HS (MI) (backfield/JV)
- 1962–1968: Resurrection/Gabriels HS (MI)
- 1969–1970: East Lansing HS (MI)
- 1971–1990: Alma
- 1991: Eastern Michigan (assistant)
- 1992: Lake Michigan Catholic HS (MI)

Head coaching record
- Overall: 94–86 (college); 157–88–6 (high school, thru 2004)

Accomplishments and honors

Championships
- 3 MIAA (1971–1972, 1988)

Philip L. Brooks (born December 30, 1937) is an American former football coach. He was the head football coach at Alma College in Alma, Michigan, from 1971 to 1990. He is the author of the book Forward Pass: The Play that Saved Football. He also authored "The Fields of Greed," a fiction genre in 2017.

== Early life and playing career ==
Brooks earned first-team All-State honors in football in 1954 as a running back. Corunna football teams were 17–1 his last two years. Brooks graduated from Corunna High School in Corunna, Michigan in 1955. Brooks earned a B.A. degree from Albion College in 1960, and an M.S. Degree from Oklahoma State University in 1968.

== Coaching career ==
Brooks was the head football coach at Alma College in Alma, Michigan. He held that position for 20 seasons, from 1971 until 1990. His coaching record at Alma was 96–86.

== Head coaching record ==
=== College ===
Year	Team	Overall	Conference	Standing	Bowl/playoffs
Alma Scots (Michigan Intercollegiate Athletic Association) (1971–1990)
1971	Alma	7–2	4–1	T–1st	
1972	Alma	8–1	4–1	T–1st	
1973	Alma	5–4	2–3	T–4th	
1974	Alma	4–5	3–2	3rd	
1975	Alma	6–3	3–2	2nd	
1976	Alma	5–4	3–2	3rd	
1977	Alma	6–3	2–3	4th	
1978	Alma	4–5	0–5	6th	
1979	Alma	3–6	1–4	T–5th	
1980	Alma	2–7	1–4	T–5th	
1981	Alma	2–7	1–4	5th	
1982	Alma	3–6	1–4	T–5th	
1983	Alma	4–5	3–2	T–2nd	
1984	Alma	6–3	4–1	2nd	
1985	Alma	5–4	2–3	4th	
1986	Alma	5–4	2–3	4th	
1987	Alma	5–4	2–3	4th	
1988	Alma	6–3	4–1	T–1st	
1989	Alma	5–4	2–3	4th	
1990	Alma	3–6	0–5	6th	
Alma:		94–86	44–56		
Total:		94–86			
National championship Conference title Conference division title or championship game berth
