= 1986 Augustana (Illinois) Vikings football team =

American college football season

1986 Augustana (Illinois) Vikings football

NCAA Division III champion CCIW champion

Stagg Bowl, W 31–3 vs. Salisbury State
- Conference: College Conference of Illinois and Wisconsin
- Record: 12–0–1 (8–0 CCIW)
- Head coach: Bob Reade (8th season)
- Home stadium: Ericson Field

1986 College Conference of Illinois and Wisconsin football standings
	Conf.					Overall
Team	W		L		T	W		L		T
No. 6 Augustana (IL) $^	7	–	0	–	1	12	–	0	–	1
Millikin	6	–	2	–	0	7	–	2	–	0
Wheaton (IL)	6	–	2	–	0	7	–	2	–	0
Illinois Wesleyan	4	–	3	–	1	5	–	3	–	1
North Central (IL)	4	–	3	–	1	5	–	3	–	1
Carthage	3	–	5	–	0	3	–	6	–	0
Elmhurst	2	–	5	–	1	2	–	6	–	1
Carroll (WI)	2	–	6	–	0	2	–	7	–	0
North Park	0	–	8	–	0	0	–	9	–	0
$ – Conference champion; ^ – NCAA Division III playoff participant; Rankings from NCAA Division III poll

The 1986 Augustana (Illinois) Vikings football team was an American football team that represented Augustana College as a member of the College Conference of Illinois and Wisconsin (CCIW) during the 1986 NCAA Division III football season. In their eighth season under head coach Bob Reade, the Vikings compiled a 12–0–1 record and won the CCIW championship. The team then advanced to the NCAA Division III playoffs where they defeated Mount Union in the quarterfinal, Concordia–Moorhead in the semifinal, and Salisbury State in the national championship game. It was Augustana's fourth consecutive Division III national championship.

The team's statistical leaders included Greg Wallace with 547 passing yards, Brad Price with 1,218 rushing yards and 108 points scored, and Eric Welgat with 398 receiving yards.

They played their home games at Ericson Field in Rock Island, Illinois.

== Schedule ==
Date	Opponent	Site	Result	Attendance	Source
September 13	at Elmhurst	Elmhurst, IL	T 0–0	3,000	
September 20	North Park	Ericson Field; Rock Island, IL	W 55–7	1,000	
September 27	at Carroll (WI)	Waukesha, WI	W 42–7	1,500	
October 4	Wheaton (IL)	Ericson Field; Rock Island, IL	W 18–17	3,000	
October 11	at Illinois Wesleyan	Bloomington, IL	W 44–7	2,100	
October 18	Carthage	Ericson Field; Rock Island, IL	W 49–0	4,000	
October 25	at Millikin	Decatur, IL	W 12–2	2,500	
November 1	North Central (IL)	Ericson Field; Rock Island, IL	W 56–0	1,000	
November 8	MacMurray*	Ericson Field; Rock Island, IL	W 42–6	800	
November 22	at Hope*	Holland, MI (NCAA Division III first round)	W 34–10	2,532	
November 29	at Mount Union*	Alliance, OH (NCAA Division III quarterfinal)	W 16–7		
December 6	Concordia–Moorhead*	Rock Island Public Schools Stadium; Rock Island, IL (NCAA Division III semifinal)	W 41–7		
December 13	vs. Salisbury State*	Garrett–Harrison Stadium; Phenix City, AL (Stagg Bowl—NCAA Division III championship game)	W 31–3		
*Non-conference game
