= Ada Iddings Gale =

American author and educator

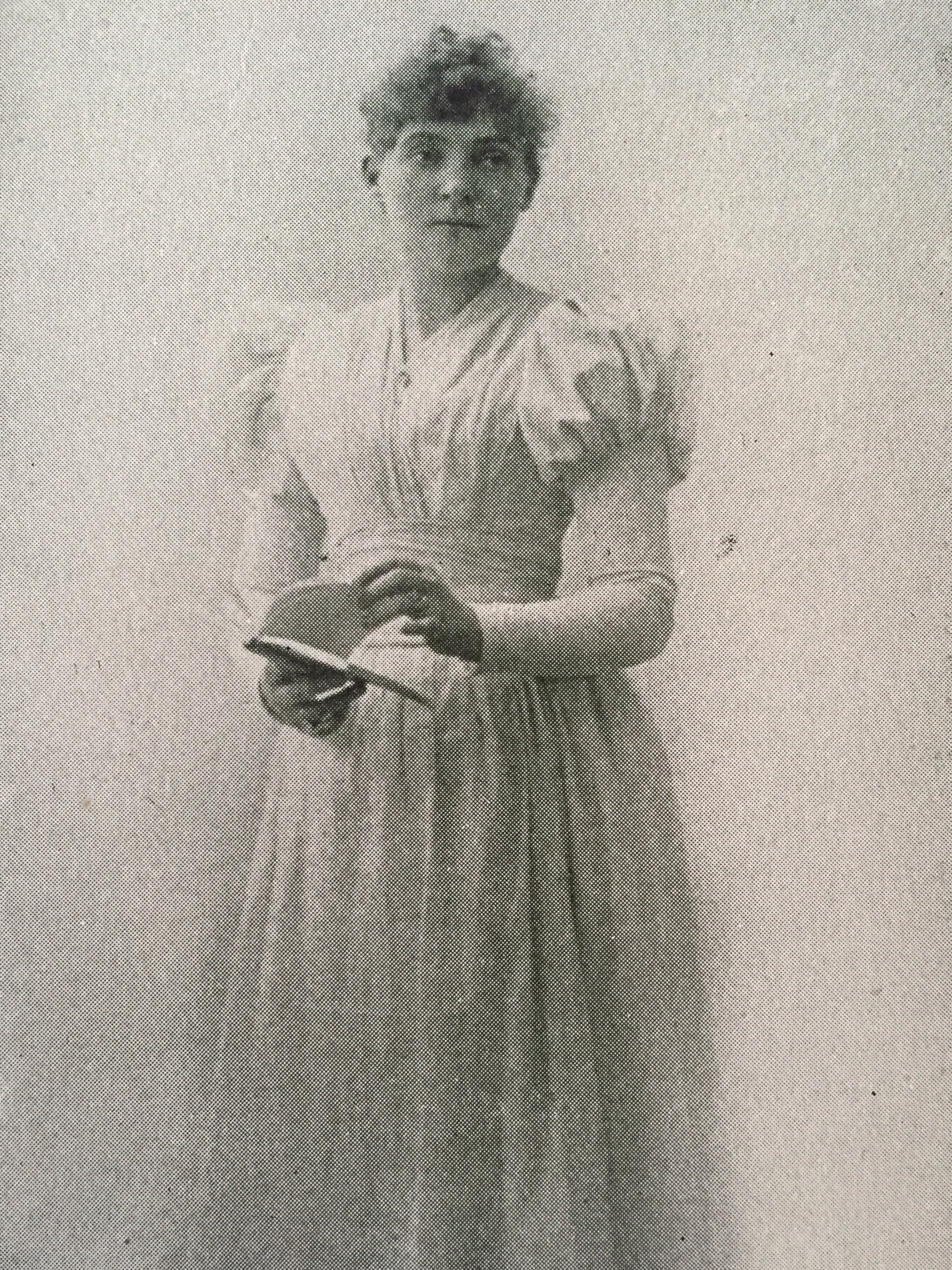
"A Woman of the Century"

Ada Iddings Gale (February 24, 1854 - February 25, 1915) was an author and educator.

== Early life ==
Ada Iddings Gale was born on February 24, 1854, in Dayton, Ohio, the daughter of Joseph Talbert Iddings (1829-1891) and Martha Ann Johnston (1829-1899). She descended from a long line of Quaker ancestry. After ministering in Ohio, Indiana and Michigan, Rev. Iddings retired at Albion, Michigan.

She attended Albion College, graduate Class of 1874. In her early childhood her literary inclining was apparent and received careful fostering from her father, Rev. Joseph Iddings, who was also largely her teacher.

She was a student of English history and literature.

== Career ==
She was a dramatic reader and a teacher of dramatic art. Her daughter Winifred became a dramatic reader as well and toured with the Mozart Quartette.

She was the reader and instructor of the E.L.T. Club of Albion. The club was established in 1893. In 1899 Mary Sheldon Ismon donated the club house, that was shared with the Leisure Hour Club.

She lectured on the "Attributes of Beauty " and published two books, one a volume of verse, "A Little English Portfolio", the other, "Zenobia", a 17th-century romance.

She was a vice-president of the Michigan Woman's Press Association.

== Personal life ==
She lived at Albion, Michigan, and had three children: Lieutenant Alfred Harvey Gale, 4th Field Artillery, U.S. Army; Mrs. Leroy Anderson of Prescott, Arizona; and Winifred Lee Gayle of Fort Sam Houston, Texas. She divorced her first husband, Alpheus Smith Gale, 1898. She remarried Maj Henry D. Thomason (1858–1936), a doctor who served during the Spanish–American War and in the army medical corps in Cuba and in the Philippines and then worked as surgeon on several ocean steamships.

She died on February 25, 1915, in Fort Sam Houston, and is buried with her husband at Riverside Cemetery, Albion, Michigan.
