= Hope Flying Dutchmen football, 1980–1989 =

American college football seasons

1980–1989 Hope Flying Dutchmen football
- Conference: Michigan Intercollegiate Athletic Association
- Head coach: Ray Smith (1970–1994)

The Hope Flying Tigers football program, 1980–1989 represented Hope College from 1980 to 1989 in NCAA Division II college football as a member of the Michigan Intercollegiate Athletic Association (MIAA). The team was led by head coach Ray Smith, who held the position from 1970 to 1994.

== 1980 ==
1980 Hope Flying Dutchmen football
- Conference: Michigan Intercollegiate Athletic Association
- Record: 4–5 (4–1 MIAA)
- Head coach: Ray Smith (11th season)

1980 Michigan Intercollegiate Athletic Association football standings
	Conf.					Overall
Team	W		L		T	W		L		T
Adrian $	5	–	0	–	0	9	–	0	–	0
Hope	4	–	1	–	0	4	–	5	–	0
Albion	2	–	3	–	0	5	–	4	–	0
Olivet	2	–	3	–	0	2	–	6	–	0
Kalamazoo	1	–	4	–	0	3	–	5	–	0
Alma	1	–	4	–	0	2	–	7	–	0
$ – Conference champion

The 1980 Hope Flying Dutchmen football team represented Hope College of Hope, Michigan. In their 11th year under head coach Ray Smith, the Flying Dutchmen compiled a 4–5 record (4–1 against MIAA opponents), finished in second place in the MIAA, and were outscored opponents by a total of 170 to 168.

=== Schedule ===
Date	Opponent	Site	Result	Attendance	Source
September 6	Grand Valley State*	Holland, MI	L 7–14	6,308	
September 13	at Wabash*	Crawfordsville, IN	L 14–44		
September 20	DePauw*	Holland, MI	L 7–10		
September 27	at Franklin (IN)*	Franklin, IN	L 14–19		
October 4	Kalamazoo	Holland, MI	W 27–14		
October 11	at Adrian	Adrian, MI	L 21–35		
October 18	at Alma	Alma, MMI	W 23–6		
October 25	at Albion	Albion, MI	W 14–0		
November 1	Olivet	Olivet, MI	W 41–28		
*Non-conference game

== 1981 ==
1981 Hope Flying Dutchmen football

MIAA champion
- Conference: Michigan Intercollegiate Athletic Association
- Record: 6–3 (5–0 MIAA)
- Head coach: Ray Smith (12th season)

1981 Michigan Intercollegiate Athletic Association football standings
	Conf.					Overall
Team	W		L		T	W		L		T
Hope $	5	–	0	–	0	6	–	3	–	0
Adrian	4	–	1	–	0	8	–	1	–	0
Albion	2	–	2	–	1	4	–	4	–	1
Kalamazoo	2	–	3	–	0	3	–	6	–	0
Alma	1	–	4	–	0	2	–	7	–	0
Olivet	0	–	4	–	1	3	–	5	–	1
$ – Conference champion

The 1981 Hope Flying Dutchmen football team represented Hope College of Hope, Michigan. In their 12th year under head coach Ray Smith, the Flying Dutchmen compiled a 6–3 record (5–0 in MIAA games) and won the MIAA championship.

=== Schedule ===
Date	Opponent	Site	Result	Attendance	Source
September 5	at Valparaiso*	Valparaiso, IN	W 27–2		
September 12	Wabash*	Holland, MI	L 7–14		
September 19	at DePauw*	Greencastle, IN	L 21–35		
September 26	Franklin*	Holland, MI	L 14–28		
October 10	Albion	Holland, MI	W 44–14		
October 17	at Alma	Alma, MI	W 27–19	6,000	
October 24	Kalamazoo	Holland, MI	W 55–28		
October 31	at Adrian	Adrian, MI	W 20–3	5,000	
November 7	Olivet	Holland, MI	W 49–8		
*Non-conference game

== 1982 ==
1982 Hope Flying Dutchmen football

MIAA champion
- Conference: Michigan Intercollegiate Athletic Association
- Record: 8–1 (5–0 MIAA)
- Head coach: Ray Smith (13th season)

1982 Michigan Intercollegiate Athletic Association football standings
	Conf.					Overall
Team	W		L		T	W		L		T
Hope $	5	–	0	–	0	8	–	1	–	0
Adrian	3	–	2	–	0	7	–	2	–	0
Kalamazoo	2	–	2	–	1	5	–	2	–	1
Albion	2	–	2	–	1	3	–	5	–	1
Alma	1	–	4	–	0	3	–	6	–	0
Olivet	1	–	4	–	0	1	–	8	–	0
$ – Conference champion

The 1982 Hope Flying Dutchmen football team represented Hope College of Hope, Michigan, during the 1982 NCAA Division III football season. In their 13th year under head coach Ray Smith, the Flying Dutchmen compiled an 8–1 record (5–0 in MIAA games) and won the MIAA championship.

=== Schedule ===
Date	Opponent	Site	Result	Attendance	Source
September 11	at Wabash	Little Giant Stadium; Crawfordsville, IN	L 7–27	4,000	
September 18	DePauw	Holland, MI	W 48–7	3,924	
September 25	Oberlin*	Holland, MI	W 49–14		
October 2	at Kenyon*	Gambier, OH	W 21–9		
October 9	at Albion	Albion, MI	W 34–0	2,283	
October 16	Alma	Holland, MI	W 28–7		
October 23	at Kalamazoo	Angell Field; Holland, MI	W 40–0		
October 30	Adrian	Holland, MI	W 28–14	4,345	
November 6	at Olivet	Olivet, MI	W 40–0		
*Non-conference game

== 1983 ==
1983 Hope Flying Dutchmen football
- Conference: Michigan Intercollegiate Athletic Association
- Record: 6–3 (3–2 MIAA)
- Head coach: Ray Smith (14th season)

1983 Michigan Intercollegiate Athletic Association football standings
	Conf.					Overall
Team	W		L		T	W		L		T
Adrian $^	5	–	0	–	0	8	–	2	–	0
Hope	3	–	2	–	0	6	–	3	–	0
Alma	3	–	2	–	0	4	–	5	–	0
Albion	2	–	3	–	0	5	–	4	–	0
Kalamazoo	2	–	3	–	0	5	–	4	–	0
Olivet	0	–	5	–	0	3	–	6	–	0
$ – Conference champion; ^ – NCAA Division III playoff participant

The 1983 Hope Flying Dutchmen football team represented Hope College. In their 14th year under head coach Ray Smith, the Flying Dutchmen compiled a 6–3 record (3–2 in MIAA games) and tied for second place in the MIAA.

== 1984 ==
1984 Hope Flying Dutchmen football

MIAA champion
- Conference: Michigan Intercollegiate Athletic Association
- Record: 9–0 (5–0 MIAA)
- Head coach: Ray Smith (15th season)

1984 Michigan Intercollegiate Athletic Association football standings
	Conf.					Overall
Team	W		L		T	W		L		T
Hope $	5	–	0	–	0	9	–	0	–	0
Alma	4	–	1	–	0	6	–	3	–	0
Albion	3	–	2	–	0	5	–	4	–	0
Adrian	2	–	3	–	0	5	–	4	–	0
Olivet	1	–	4	–	0	1	–	8	–	0
Kalamazoo	0	–	5	–	0	1	–	8	–	0
$ – Conference champion

The 1984 Hope Flying Dutchmen football team represented Hope College of Hope, Michigan. In their 15th year under head coach Ray Smith, the Flying Dutchmen compiled a 9–0 record (5–0 against MIAA opponents), won the MIAA championship, and outscored opponents by a total of 363 to 116. The team led the nation in scoring offense with an average of 40.3 points per game. It is the only Hope football team to compile a perfect season.

Despite being ranked No. 8 in the final Division III poll, Hope was not included in the eight teams invited to the Division III playoffs.

Hope was the first college or university in Michigan to field undefeated teams in both football and basketball in the same season. The basketball team compiled a 22–0 record.

=== Schedule ===
Date	Opponent	Site	Result	Attendance	Source
September 8	at Olivet Nazarene*	Bourbonnais, IL	W 41–7		
September 15	DePauw*	Holland, MI	W 34–26		
September 22	at Carthage*	Kenosha, WI	W 54–7		
September 29	Wabash*	Holland, MI	W 34–24		
October 6	Albion	Holland, MI	W 28–6		
October 13	at Kalamazoo	Kalamazoo, MI	W 45–0		
October 20	Adrian	Holland, MI	W 38–17		
October 27	at Alma	Alma, MI	W 34–29		
November 3	Olivet	Holland, MI	W 55–0		
*Non-conference game

== 1985 ==
1985 Hope Flying Dutchmen football
- Conference: Michigan Intercollegiate Athletic Association
- Record: 5–3–1 (3–1–1 MIAA)
- Head coach: Ray Smith (16th season)

1985 Michigan Intercollegiate Athletic Association football standings
	Conf.					Overall
Team	W		L		T	W		L		T
Albion $^	4	–	0	–	1	7	–	2	–	1
Adrian	4	–	1	–	0	6	–	3	–	0
Hope	3	–	1	–	1	5	–	3	–	1
Alma	2	–	3	–	0	5	–	4	–	0
Kalamazoo	1	–	4	–	0	1	–	8	–	0
Olivet	0	–	5	–	0	0	–	9	–	0
$ – Conference champion; ^ – NCAA Division III playoff participant

The 1985 Hope Flying Dutchmen football team represented Hope College. In their 16th year under head coach Ray Smith, the Flying Dutchmen compiled a 5–3–1 record (3–1–1 in MIAA games) and finished in third place in the MIAA.

== 1986 ==
1986 Hope Flying Dutchmen football

MIAA champion

NCAA Division III playoffs, 1st round, L 10–34 vs. Augustana (IL)
- Conference: Michigan Intercollegiate Athletic Association
- Record: 7–2–1 (4–0–1 MIAA)
- Head coach: Ray Smith (17th season)

1986 Michigan Intercollegiate Athletic Association football standings
	Conf.					Overall
Team	W		L		T	W		L		T
No. 11 Hope $^	4	–	0	–	1	7	–	2	–	1
Adrian	4	–	1	–	0	8	–	1	–	0
Albion	3	–	1	–	1	6	–	2	–	1
Alma	2	–	3	–	0	5	–	4	–	0
Kalamazoo	1	–	4	–	0	1	–	8	–	0
Olivet	0	–	5	–	0	3	–	6	–	0
$ – Conference champion; ^ – NCAA Division III playoff participant; Rankings from NCAA Division III poll

The 1986 Hope Flying Dutchmen football team represented Hope College of Hope, Michigan. In their 17th year under head coach Ray Smith, the Flying Dutchmen compiled a 7–2–1 record (4–0–1 in MIAA games) and won the MIAA championship.

=== Schedule ===
Date	Opponent	Site	Result	Attendance	Source
September 13	Wittenberg*	Holland Municipal Stadium; Holland, MI	L 20–23	3,383	
September 20	at DePauw*	Greencastle, IN	W 21–13		
September 27	Wabash*	Holland Municipal Stadium; Holland, MI	W 13–3	2,582	
October 4	at Findlay*	Findlay, OH	W 21–16		
October 11	Alma	Holland Municipal Stadium; Holland, MI	W 35–7		
October 18	at Adrian	Adrian, MI	W 42–10	4,000	
October 25	Kalamazoo	Holland Municipal Stadium; Holland, MI	W 30–13	2,527	
November 1	at Olivet	Olivet, MI	W 10–7		
November 8	at Albion	Albion, MI	T 29–29	4,011	
November 22	Augustana (IL)*	Holland Municipal Stadium; Holland, MI (NCAA Division III 1st round)	L 10–34	2,532	
*Non-conference game

== 1987 ==
1987 Hope Flying Dutchmen football

MIAA champion
- Conference: Michigan Intercollegiate Athletic Association
- Record: 6–3 (5–0 MIAA)
- Head coach: Ray Smith (18th season)
- Home stadium: Holland Municipal Stadium

1987 Michigan Intercollegiate Athletic Association football standings
	Conf.					Overall
Team	W		L		T	W		L		T
Hope $	5	–	0	–	0	6	–	3	–	0
Adrian	4	–	1	–	0	7	–	2	–	0
Albion	3	–	2	–	0	5	–	4	–	0
Alma	2	–	3	–	0	5	–	4	–	0
Olivet	1	–	4	–	0	2	–	6	–	1
Kalamazoo	0	–	5	–	0	1	–	8	–	0
$ – Conference champion

The 1987 Hope Flying Dutchmen football team represented Hope College during the 1987 NCAA Division II football season. In their 18th year under head coach Ray Smith, the Flying Dutchmen compiled a 6–3 record (5–0 in MIAA games) and won the MIAA championship. The team played its home games at Holland Municipal Stadium in Hope, Michigan.

=== Schedule ===
Date	Opponent	Site	Result	Attendance	Source
September 12	at Wittenberg	Springfield, OH	L 17–31	3,200	
September 19	DePauw	Holland Municipal Stadium; Holland, MI	W 46–7	3,962	
September 26	at Wabash	Crawfordsville, IN	L 14–27		
October 3	Findlay	Holland Municipal Stadium; Holland, MI	L 14–23	2,327	
October 10	Albion	Holland Municipal Stadium; Holland, MI	W 31–28		
October 17	at Kalamazoo	Angell Field; Kalamazoo, MI	W 30–10	2,500	
October 24	Alma	Holland Municipal Stadium; Holland, MI	W 10–7		
October 31	at Adrian	Adrian, MI	W 48–14	4,500	
November 7	Olivet	Holland Municipal Stadium; Holland, MI	W 48–14		

== 1988 ==
1988 Hope Flying Dutchmen football
- Conference: Michigan Intercollegiate Athletic Association
- Record: 1–7–1 (1–4 MIAA)
- Head coach: Ray Smith (19th season)

1988 Michigan Intercollegiate Athletic Association football standings
	Conf.					Overall
Team	W		L		T	W		L		T
Adrian +^	4	–	1	–	0	7	–	3	–	0
Alma +	4	–	1	–	0	6	–	3	–	0
Albion	3	–	2	–	0	6	–	3	–	0
Olivet	2	–	2	–	1	4	–	4	–	1
Hope	1	–	4	–	0	1	–	7	–	1
Kalamazoo	0	–	4	–	1	0	–	8	–	1
+ – Conference co-champions; ^ – NCAA Division III playoff participant

The 1988 Hope Flying Dutchmen football team represented Hope College of Hope, Michigan. In their 19th year under head coach Ray Smith, the Flying Dutchmen compiled a 1–7–1 record (1–4 in MIAA games) and finished in fifth place in the MIAA.

== 1989 ==
1989 Hope Flying Dutchmen football
- Conference: Michigan Intercollegiate Athletic Association
- Record: 4–5–1 (3–2 MIAA)
- Head coach: Ray Smith (20th season)

1989 Michigan Intercollegiate Athletic Association football standings
	Conf.					Overall
Team	W		L		T	W		L		T
Albion +	4	–	1	–	0	7	–	2	–	0
Adrian +	4	–	1	–	0	5	–	4	–	0
Hope	3	–	2	–	0	4	–	5	–	1
Alma	2	–	3	–	0	5	–	4	–	0
Olivet	1	–	4	–	0	4	–	5	–	0
Kalamazoo	1	–	4	–	0	1	–	7	–	1
+ – Conference co-champions

The 1989 Hope Flying Dutchmen football team represented Hope College. In their 20th year under head coach Ray Smith, the Flying Dutchmen compiled a 4–5–1 record (3–2 in MIAA games) and finished in third place in the MIAA.
