= Ron Lynch (American football) =

American football player and coach (born 1940)

Biographical details
- Born: June 2, 1940 (age 86)

Playing career

Football
- c. 1960: Olivet
- Positions: Guard, linebacker

Coaching career (HC unless noted)

Football
- 1962–1963: Bellevue HS (MI) (assistant)
- 1964: Athens HS (MI) (assistant)
- 1965–1967: Western HS (MI) (assistant)
- 1968–1969: Clinton HS (MI)
- 1970: Lakeview HS (MI) (assistant)
- 1971–1974: Lakeview HS (MI)
- 1975–1977: Hillsdale (assistant)
- 1978–1979: Hillsdale
- 1980–1981: Olivet
- 1982–1983: Baytown Lee HS (TX) (assistant)
- 1984–1995: Deer Park HS (TX)
- 1996–1997: Alvin HS (TX)
- 1998–1999: Newman Smith HS (TX)
- 2000–2002: Westfield HS (TX)
- 2006: Magnolia HS (TX)
- 2017–2018: Alpha Omega Academy (TX)

Baseball
- 1965: Athens HS (MI)

Wrestling
- 1965–1968: Western HS (MI)

Administrative career (AD unless noted)
- 1968–1970: Clinton HS (MI)
- 1996–1998: Alvin HS (TX)

Head coaching record
- Overall: 14–24–1 (college football)

Ron Lynch (born June 2, 1940) is an American former football coach. He served as the head coach at Hillsdale College from 1978 to 1979 and at Olivet College from 1980 to 1981, compiling a career college football record of 14–24–1. Lynch played college football at Olivet and coached high school football in Michigan and Texas.

== Early life and education ==
Lynch grew up in Lyon County, Kentucky. He graduated from Olivet College in Olivet, Michigan, where started on the football team for three seasons as a guard and linebacker. Lynch later a master's degree from Eastern Michigan University in 1968.

== Coaching career ==
Lynch was the head football coach at Hillsdale College in Hillsdale, Michigan for two seasons, from 1978 to 1979, compiling a record of 8–14.

== Head coaching record ==
=== College football ===
Year	Team	Overall	Conference	Standing	Bowl/playoffs
Hillsdale Chargers (Great Lakes Intercollegiate Athletic Conference) (1978–1979)
1978	Hillsdale	5–6	1–4	6th	
1979	Hillsdale	3–8	1–4	T–5th	
Hillsdale:		8–14	2–8		
Olivet Comets (Michigan Intercollegiate Athletic Association) (1980–1981)
1980	Olivet	3–6	2–3	T–3rd	
1981	Olivet	3–5–1	0–4–1	6th	
Olivet:		6–11–1	2–7–1		
Total:		14–24–1			
