= Hope Flying Dutchmen football, 1970–1979 =

American college football seasons

1970–1979 Hope Flying Dutchmen football
- Conference: Michigan Intercollegiate Athletic Association
- Head coach: Ray Smith (1970–1994)

The Hope Flying Tigers football program, 1970–1979 represented Hope College during the 1970s in NCAA Division II college football as a member of the Michigan Intercollegiate Athletic Association (MIAA). The team was led by head coach Ray Smith, who held the position from 1970 to 1994.

== 1970 ==
1970 Hope Flying Dutchmen football
- Conference: Michigan Intercollegiate Athletic Association
- Record: 5–4 (3–2 MIAA)
- Head coach: Ray Smith (1st season)
- Home stadium: Riverview Park

1970 Michigan Intercollegiate Athletic Association football standings
	Conf.					Overall
Team	W		L		T	W		L		T
Adrian +	4	–	1	–	0	6	–	3	–	0
Alma +	4	–	1	–	0	5	–	3	–	0
Hope	3	–	2	–	0	5	–	4	–	0
Albion	3	–	2	–	0	3	–	6	–	0
Kalamazoo	1	–	4	–	0	3	–	5	–	0
Olivet	0	–	5	–	0	0	–	9	–	0
+ – Conference co-champions

The 1970 Hope Flying Dutchmen football team represented Hope College during the 1970 NCAA College Division football season. In their first year under head coach Ray Smith, the Flying Dutchmen compiled a 5–4 record (3–2 in conference games) and tied for third place in the MIAA. The team's assistant coaches were Russ DeVette, George Kraft, and Jim Bultman. The team played its home games at Riverview Park in Holland, Michigan.

== 1971 ==
1971 Hope Flying Dutchmen football
- Conference: Michigan Intercollegiate Athletic Association
- Record: 4–5 (2–3 MIAA)
- Head coach: Ray Smith (2nd season)
- Home stadium: Riverview Park

1971 Michigan Intercollegiate Athletic Association football standings
	Conf.					Overall
Team	W		L		T	W		L		T
No. 10 Alma +	4	–	1	–	0	7	–	2	–	0
Adrian +	4	–	1	–	0	5	–	4	–	0
Olivet	2	–	2	–	1	3	–	4	–	1
Kalamazoo	2	–	3	–	0	5	–	3	–	0
Hope	2	–	3	–	0	4	–	5	–	0
Albion	0	–	4	–	1	0	–	7	–	2
+ – Conference co-champions; Rankings from NAIA Division II poll

The 1971 Hope Flying Dutchmen football team represented Hope College during the 1971 NCAA College Division football season. In their second year under head coach Ray Smith, the Flying Dutchmen compiled a 4–5 record (2–3 in conference games) and tied for fourth place in the MIAA. The team played its home games at Riverview Park in Holland, Michigan.

== 1972 ==
1972 Hope Flying Dutchmen football
- Conference: Michigan Intercollegiate Athletic Association
- Record: 6–2–1 (3–1–1 MIAA)
- Head coach: Ray Smith (3rd season)

1972 Michigan Intercollegiate Athletic Association football standings
	Conf.					Overall
Team	W		L		T	W		L		T
No. 8 Alma +	4	–	1	–	0	8	–	1	–	0
Adrian +	4	–	1	–	0	5	–	4	–	0
Hope	3	–	1	–	1	6	–	2	–	1
Olivet	2	–	3	–	0	3	–	6	–	0
Kalamazoo	1	–	3	–	1	2	–	5	–	1
Albion	0	–	5	–	0	2	–	7	–	0
+ – Conference co-champions; Rankings from NAIA Division II poll

The 1972 Hope Flying Dutchmen football team represented Hope College of Holland, Michigan, during the 1972 NCAA College Division football season. In their third year under head coach Ray Smith, the Flying Dutchmen compiled a 6–2–1 record (3–1–1 in conference games) and finished in third place in the MIAA.

== 1973 ==
1973 Hope Flying Dutchmen football

MIAA champion
- Conference: Michigan Intercollegiate Athletic Association
- Record: 7–2 (5–0 MIAA)
- Head coach: Ray Smith (4th season)

1973 Michigan Intercollegiate Athletic Association football standings
	Conf.					Overall
Team	W		L		T	W		L		T
Hope $	5	–	0	–	0	7	–	2	–	0
Olivet	3	–	2	–	0	6	–	3	–	0
Albion	3	–	2	–	0	3	–	6	–	0
Alma	2	–	3	–	0	5	–	4	–	0
Kalamazoo	2	–	3	–	0	4	–	4	–	0
Adrian	0	–	5	–	0	1	–	8	–	0
$ – Conference champion

The 1973 Hope Flying Dutchmen football team represented Hope College of Holland, Michigan, during the 1973 NCAA Division II football season. In their fourth year under head coach Ray Smith, the Flying Dutchmen compiled a 7–2 record (5–0 in conference games) and won the MIAA championship.

It was Hope's first outright conference championship in 20 years. Running back Ed Sanders was selected as the most valuable player in the MIAA. Several Hope players received first-team honors on the 1973 All-MIAA team: Sanders; Chuch Brooks, Gerrit Crandall, Bob Kibbey, Bob Yeiter, Craig Van Tuinan, Ron Posthuma, Bob Lees, Jeff Stewart, and Bob Lamer.

== 1974 ==
1974 Hope Flying Dutchmen football
- Conference: Michigan Intercollegiate Athletic Association
- Record: 8–1 (4–1 MIAA)
- Head coach: Ray Smith (5th season)
- Home stadium: Riverview Park

1974 Michigan Intercollegiate Athletic Association football standings
	Conf.					Overall
Team	W		L		T	W		L		T
Olivet $	5	–	0	–	0	7	–	2	–	0
Hope	4	–	1	–	0	8	–	1	–	0
Alma	3	–	2	–	0	4	–	5	–	0
Albion	2	–	3	–	0	3	–	6	–	0
Kalamazoo	1	–	4	–	0	2	–	6	–	0
Adrian	0	–	5	–	0	2	–	7	–	0
$ – Conference champion

The 1974 Hope Flying Dutchmen football team represented Hope College during the 1974 NCAA Division II football season. In their fifth year under head coach Ray Smith, the Flying Dutchmen compiled a 8–1 record (4–1 in conference games) and finished in second place in the MIAA. The team played its home games at Riverview Park in Holland, Michigan.

== 1975 ==
1975 Hope Flying Dutchmen football

MIAA champion
- Conference: Michigan Intercollegiate Athletic Association
- Record: 8–0–1 (4–0–1 MIAA)
- Head coach: Ray Smith (6th season)

1975 Michigan Intercollegiate Athletic Association football standings
	Conf.					Overall
Team	W		L		T	W		L		T
Hope $	4	–	0	–	1	8	–	0	–	1
Alma	3	–	2	–	0	6	–	3	–	0
Albion	2	–	2	–	1	6	–	2	–	1
Adrian	2	–	3	–	0	4	–	5	–	0
Olivet	2	–	3	–	0	4	–	5	–	0
Kalamazoo	1	–	4	–	0	4	–	4	–	0
$ – Conference champion

The 1975 Hope Flying Dutchmen football team represented Hope College of Holland, Michigan, during the 1975 NCAA Division II football season. In their sixth year under head coach Ray Smith, the Flying Dutchmen compiled a 8–0–1 record (4–0–1 in conference games) and won the MIAA championship. It was the first undefeated season in Hope football history and set school records with 271 points scored and 37 touchdowns. The team was ranked sixth in the NCAA Division III Small College poll.

Quarterback Tim Van Heest was selected as the most valuable player in the MIAA. Eight Hope layers received first-team all-conference honors: Van Heest, Bob Les, Craig Van Tuinen, Rick McClouth, Len Fazio, Dave De Waan, Dewey Thompson, and Bill Blacquire.

== 1976 ==
1976 Hope Flying Dutchmen football
- Conference: Michigan Intercollegiate Athletic Association
- Record: 6–3 (4–1 MIAA)
- Head coach: Ray Smith (7th season)

1976 Michigan Intercollegiate Athletic Association football standings
	Conf.					Overall
Team	W		L		T	W		L		T
Albion $	5	–	0	–	0	9	–	0	–	0
Hope	4	–	1	–	0	6	–	3	–	0
Alma	3	–	2	–	0	5	–	4	–	0
Kalamazoo	2	–	3	–	0	3	–	4	–	1
Adrian	1	–	4	–	0	3	–	6	–	0
Olivet	0	–	5	–	0	0	–	9	–	0
$ – Conference champion

The 1976 Hope Flying Dutchmen football team represented Hope College of Holland, Michigan, during the 1976 NCAA Division II football season. In their seventh year under head coach Ray Smith, the Flying Dutchmen compiled a 6–3 record (4–1 in conference games) and finished in second place in the MIAA.

== 1977 ==
1977 Hope Flying Dutchmen football
- Conference: Michigan Intercollegiate Athletic Association
- Record: 6–3 (4–1 MIAA)
- Head coach: Ray Smith (8th season)

1977 Michigan Intercollegiate Athletic Association football standings
	Conf.					Overall
Team	W		L		T	W		L		T
Albion $^	5	–	0	–	0	8	–	2	–	0
Hope	4	–	1	–	0	6	–	3	–	0
Adrian	2	–	2	–	1	4	–	4	–	1
Alma	2	–	3	–	0	6	–	3	–	0
Kalamazoo	1	–	4	–	0	3	–	5	–	0
Olivet	0	–	4	–	1	0	–	8	–	1
$ – Conference champion; ^ – NCAA Division III playoff participant

The 1977 Hope Flying Dutchmen football team represented Hope College of Holland, Michigan, during the 1977 NCAA Division II football season. In their eighth year under head coach Ray Smith, the Flying Dutchmen compiled a 6–3 record (4–1 in conference games) and finished in second place in the MIAA.

== 1978 ==
1978 Hope Flying Dutchmen football

MIAA champion
- Conference: Michigan Intercollegiate Athletic Association
- Record: 8–1 (5–0 MIAA)
- Head coach: Ray Smith (9th season)

1978 Michigan Intercollegiate Athletic Association football standings
	Conf.					Overall
Team	W		L		T	W		L		T
Hope $	5	–	0	–	0	8	–	1	–	0
Adrian	4	–	1	–	0	6	–	3	–	0
Kalamazoo	3	–	2	–	0	6	–	2	–	0
Albion	2	–	3	–	0	3	–	5	–	0
Olivet	1	–	4	–	0	2	–	7	–	0
Alma	0	–	5	–	0	4	–	5	–	0
$ – Conference champion

The 1978 Hope Flying Dutchmen football team represented Hope College of Holland, Michigan, during the 1978 NCAA Division II football season. In their ninth year under head coach Ray Smith, the Flying Dutchmen compiled an 8–1 record (5–0 in conference games) and won the MIAA championship.

=== Schedule ===
Date	Opponent	Site	Result	Attendance	Source
September 9	Maranatha Baptist*	Holland, MI	W 28–0		
September 16	at Wabash*	Crawfordsville, IN	L 3–13		
September 23	DePauw*	Holland, MI	W 35–13		
September 30	Olivet Nazarene*	Holland, MI	W 42–12		
October 7	Albion	Holland, MI	W 31–27		
October 14	at Olivet	Olivet, MI	W 48–0		
October 21	Adrian^{†}	Holland, MI	W 7–0		
October 28	at Alma	Alma, MI	W 16–0		
November 4	Kalamazoo	Holland, MI	W 31–13		
*Non-conference game; ^{†}Homecoming

== 1979 ==
1979 Hope Flying Dutchmen football

MIAA champion
- Conference: Michigan Intercollegiate Athletic Association
- Record: 7–1–1 (4–0–1 MIAA)
- Head coach: Ray Smith (10th season)
- Home stadium: Holland Municipal Stadium

1979 Michigan Intercollegiate Athletic Association football standings
	Conf.					Overall
Team	W		L		T	W		L		T
Hope $	4	–	0	–	1	7	–	1	–	1
Adrian	3	–	1	–	1	6	–	2	–	1
Albion	3	–	2	–	0	4	–	5	–	0
Kalamazoo	2	–	3	–	0	5	–	3	–	0
Olivet	1	–	4	–	0	4	–	5	–	0
Alma	1	–	4	–	0	3	–	6	–	0
$ – Conference champion

The 1979 Hope Flying Dutchmen football team represented Hope College of Holland, Michigan, during the 1979 NCAA Division II football season. In their tenth year under head coach Ray Smith, the Flying Dutchmen compiled an 7–1–1 record (4–0–1 in conference games) and won the MIAA championship.

Craig Groendyk was named to the Little All-America team, the first Hope player to bee so honored in over 20 years. Sophomore quarterback Mark Spencer led the MIAA in passing. Kicker Greg Bekius led the MIAA in scoring with 24 extra points and five field goals.

=== Schedule ===
Date	Opponent	Site	Result	Attendance	Source
September 8	Maranatha Baptist*	Holland Municipal Stadium; Holland, MI	W 64–0		
September 15	Wabash*	Holland Municipal Stadium; Holland, MI	W 20–2		
September 22	at DePauw*	Greencastle, IN	L 11–14		
September 29	Olivet Nazarene*	Holland Municipal Stadium; Holland, MI	W 35–8		
October 6	at Kalamazoo	Angell Field; Kalamazoo, MI	W 24–3		
October 13	Adrian	Holland Municipal Stadium; Holland, MI	T 6–6		
October 20	Alma^{†}	Holland, MI	W 19–0		
October 27	at Albion	Albion, MI	W 12–3		
November 3	Olivet	Holland Municipal Stadium; Holland, MI	W 42–21		
*Non-conference game; ^{†}Homecoming
