= Ray Smith (American football coach) =

American gridiron football player

Biographical details
- Born: c. 1938; Los Angeles, California, U.S.

Playing career
- 1956–1959: UCLA
- 1960–1962: Saskatchewan Roughriders
- Positions: Fullback, linebacker

Coaching career (HC unless noted)
- 1969: Antelope Valley
- 1970–1994: Hope

Administrative career (AD unless noted)
- 1980–2009: Hope

Head coaching record
- Overall: 148–69–9 (college); 1–8 (junior college)
- Tournaments: 0–1 (NCAA D-III playoffs)

Accomplishments and honors

Championships
- 9 MIAA (1973, 1975, 1978–1979, 1981–1982, 1984, 1986–1987)

Ray Smith (born c. 1938) is an American former gridiron football player and coach. He served as the head football coach at Hope College in Holland, Michigan from 1970 to 1994, compiling a record of 148–69–9. He played collegiately for the UCLA Bruins football team and spent three seasons playing for the Saskatchewan Roughriders of the Canadian Football League (CFL).

== Head coaching record ==
=== College ===
Year	Team	Overall	Conference	Standing	Bowl/playoffs
Hope Flying Dutchmen (Michigan Intercollegiate Athletic Association) (1970–1994)
1970	Hope	5–4	3–2	T–3rd	
1971	Hope	4–5	2–3	T–4th	
1972	Hope	6–2–1	3–1–1	3rd	
1973	Hope	7–2	5–0	1st	
1974	Hope	8–1	4–1	2nd	
1975	Hope	8–0–1	4–0–1	1st	
1976	Hope	6–3	4–1	2nd	
1977	Hope	6–3	4–1	2nd	
1978	Hope	8–1	5–0	1st	
1979	Hope	7–1–1	4–0–1	1st	
1980	Hope	4–5	4–1	2nd	
1981	Hope	6–3	5–0	1st	
1982	Hope	8–1	5–0	1st	
1983	Hope	6–3	3–2	T–2nd	
1984	Hope	9–0	5–0	1st	
1985	Hope	5–3–1	3–1–1	3rd	
1986	Hope	7–2–1	4–0–1	1st	L NCAA Division III First Round
1987	Hope	6–3	5–0	1st	
1988	Hope	1–7–1	1–4	5th	
1989	Hope	4–5	3–2	3rd	
1990	Hope	6–1–2	3–1–1	2nd	
1991	Hope	6–3	3–2	T–2nd	
1992	Hope	6–3	4–1	2nd	
1993	Hope	5–4	3–2	3rd	
1994	Hope	4–4–1	2–3	T–3rd	
Hope:		148–69–9	91–28–6		
Total:		148–69–9			
National championship Conference title Conference division title or championship game berth

=== Junior college ===
Year	Team	Overall	Conference	Standing	Bowl/playoffs
Antelope Valley Marauders (Western State Conference) (1969)
1969	Antelope Valley	1–8	0–5	6th	
Antelope Valley:		1–8	0–5		
Total:		1–8			
