= Bob Kent =

American football coach

Biographical details
- Born: c. 1942

Coaching career (HC unless noted)

Football
- 1984: Kalamazoo

Swimming and diving
- 1968–2003: Kalamazoo

Administrative career (AD unless noted)
- 1985–2001: Kalamazoo

Head coaching record
- Overall: 1–8 (football)

Bob Kent (born c. 1942) is an American former college sports coach and athletics administrator. He served as the head men's swimming and diving coach at Kalamazoo College in Kalamazoo, Michigan from 1968 to 2003. Kent was also the head football coach at Kalamazoo for one season, in 1984, and succeeded Rolla Anderson as the school's athletic director in 1985. In additional the head golf coach for nines season and an assistant baseball coach for eight seasons at the college. Kent attended Grand Haven High School in Grand Haven, Michigan. He earned bachelor's and master's degrees from Western Michigan University.

== Head coaching record ==
=== Football ===
Year	Team	Overall	Conference	Standing	Bowl/playoffs
Kalamazoo Hornets (Michigan Intercollegiate Athletic Association) (1984)
1984	Kalamazoo	1–8	0–5	6th	
Kalamazoo:		1–8	0–5		
Total:		1–8			
