= Frank Joranko =

American athlete and coach (1930–2019)

Biographical details
- Born: July 1, 1930
- Died: March 8, 2019 (aged 88); Nashville, Tennessee, U.S.

Playing career

Football
- 1948–1951: Albion
- Position: Quarterback

Coaching career (HC unless noted)

Football
- 1957–1960: Dondero HS (MI) (backfield)
- 1961–1972: Ferndale HS (MI)
- 1973–1982: Albion

Baseball
- 1973–1995: Albion

Head coaching record
- Overall: 49–39–3 (college football)
- Tournaments: Football; 0–1 (NCAA D-III playoffs)

Accomplishments and honors

Championships
- Football; 2 MIAA (1976–1977) Baseball; 9 MIAA (1973, 1976, 1979, 1981–1982, 1988–1989, 1993, 1995)

Frank L. Joranko (July 1, 1930 – March 8, 2019) was an American football and baseball player and coach. He was the head baseball coach at Albion College from 1973 to 1995, the head football coach from 1973 to 1982, and the athletic director from 1975 to 1991.

== Athlete at Albion ==
Joranko attended Albion College and graduated in the Class of 1954. While at Albion, he earned nine varsity letters in three sports—four each in football and baseball and one in basketball. He was the quarterback and defensive end for the school's football team and was selected as the most valuable player in the Michigan Intercollegiate Athletic Association ("MIAA") in 1951. After Joranko scored two touchdowns in a September 1950 game against Ashland University, one newspaper reporter wrote that Joranko "held honors for the prettiest run thus far in the fall campaign." Joranko intercepted a pass in Albion's end zone and rank the ball back 105 yards for a touchdown. Albion coach Del Anderson called it "the longest and most exciting dash I've ever seen." Joranko also played on Albion's 1950 MIAA championship baseball team.

== Military service and high school coach ==
From 1953 to 1955, Joranko served in the U.S. Army as a physical conditioner at an army hospital in El Paso, Texas. Following his service in the military, Joranko became a teacher and coach in northern Ohio. Joranko taught English and coached backfield at Dondero High School in Royal Oak, Michigan for four years through the spring of 1961. He was the football coach at Ferndale High School in Ferndale, Michigan for 12 years from 1961 to 1973. He had three unbeaten teams at Ferndale and led Ferndale to its first state football championship in 1972. Joranko's overall record at Ferndale was 84–19–5.

== Coach and athletic director at Albion College ==
In January 1973, Joranko returned to Albion College as the head coach of its football and baseball teams. He was Albion's head football coach for ten years from 1973 to 1982 and led the school to two MIAA championships. His best seasons as Albion's football coach came in 1976 with an undefeated 9–0 season and 1977 with an 8–2 record. His 1976 team led NCAA Division III in both total defense and scoring defense and finished the season ranked as the No. 3 team in NCAA Division III football. Joranko's career record at Albion was 49–39–3.

In 1980, Joranko was interviewed in an Associated Press story about the success of Division III schools, including Albion, in producing scholar-athletes. The article noted that 100% of Albion's senior football players in 1979 received their degrees. Joranko explained:

"I think, first of all, at the Division III level, the student comes to school more for studies. For example, if they have a lab or a test — they miss practice at Albion. Also, at smaller schools, the kids are apt to be a better student just to get accepted. So, his chances of success in the classroom are probably higher here."

Joranko was Albion's baseball coach from 1973 to 1995. He had over 300 career coaching wins in baseball at Albion, and his teams won 9 MIAA baseball championships and reached the Division III playoffs in 1979 and 1982. Joranko was a member of the NCAA's baseball rules committee and the regional selection committee. He was instrumental in bringing the NCAA Division III baseball tournament to Battle Creek, Michigan from 1990 to 1994, and he served as the tournament director during those years. When Joranko retired in 1995, the baseball field at Albion was named Frank Joranko Field in his honor.

Joranko was also Albion's athletic director from 1975 to 1991. During that time, Albion introduced women's golf and soccer as varsity sports. Joranko was also a professor of physical education at Albion until he retired in 1995.

Joranko is the only person who has been inducted twice into the Albion College Athletic Hall of Fame, first as an athlete in 1991, and as an administrator and coach in 1995.

== Family ==
Joranko and his wife, Joyce Weiss Joranko, had three sons, James, Dan and Tim.

== Head coaching record ==
=== College football ===
Year	Team	Overall	Conference	Standing	Bowl/playoffs
Albion Britons (Michigan Intercollegiate Athletic Association) (1973–1982)
1973	Albion	3–6	3–2	T–2nd	
1974	Albion	3–6	2–3	4th	
1975	Albion	6–2–1	2–2–1	3rd	
1976	Albion	9–0	5–0	1st	
1977	Albion	8–2	5–0	1st	L NCAA Division III First Round
1978	Albion	4–5	2–3	4th	
1979	Albion	4–5	3–2	3rd	
1980	Albion	5–4	2–3	T–3rd	
1991	Albion	4–4–1	2–2–1	3rd	
1982	Albion	3–5–1	2–2–1	T–3rd	
Albion:		49–39–3	28–19–3		
Total:		49–39–3			
National championship Conference title Conference division title or championship game berth
