= 1986 NCAA Division III football season =

American college football season

- Regular season: August – November 1986
- Playoffs: November – December 1986
- National championship: Garrett-Harrison Stadium; Phenix City, AL
- Champion: Augustana (IL)

The 1986 NCAA Division III football season, part of the college football season organized by the NCAA at the Division III level in the United States, began in August 1986, and concluded with the NCAA Division III Football Championship, also known as the Stagg Bowl, in December 1986 at Garrett-Harrison Stadium in Phenix City, Alabama. The Augustana (IL) Vikings won the fourth of their four consecutive Division III championships by defeating the Salisbury State Sea Gulls by a final score of 31−3.

== Conference Changes ==
- Loras College, which had cut its varsity program following the 1954 season and had fielded a club team since then, returned to varsity status in 1986.
- Wesley College and Menlo College, both former junior colleges who competed in the NJCAA, began sponsoring four year football in 1986.
- UC Santa Barbara, a former Division I program which had dropped football in 1971, revived their program at the Division III level in 1986.
- SUNY Maritime, which had upgraded from club status to Division III in 1985, cancelled their 1986 season. They would return for 1987 and a partial season in 1988 before cutting football once again.

School	1985 Conference	1986 Conference
Aurora	Revived Program	D-III Independent
Drake	MVC (I-AA)	D-III Independent
Fitchburg State	D-III Independent	NEFC
Loras	Club Program	Iowa Conference
Maritime	D-III Independent	Dropped Program
Menlo	NJCAA	D-III Independent
UC Santa Barbara	Revived Program	D-III Independent
Wesley	NJCAA	D-III Independent
Western Connecticut	NEFC	D-III Independent

== Conference standings ==
1986 Centennial Conference football standings
	Conf.					Overall
Team	W		L		T	W		L		T
Franklin & Marshall +	6	–	1	–	0	8	–	3	–	0
Muhlenberg +	6	–	1	–	0	7	–	3	–	0
Gettysburg	5	–	2	–	0	6	–	4	–	0
Swarthmore	4	–	3	–	0	4	–	5	–	0
Johns Hopkins	2	–	4	–	1	3	–	5	–	1
Ursinus	2	–	4	–	1	2	–	6	–	1
Dickinson	2	–	5	–	0	4	–	6	–	0
Western Maryland	0	–	7	–	0	0	–	10	–	0
+ – Conference co-champions

1986 College Athletic Conference football standings
	Conf.					Overall
Team	W		L		T	W		L		T
Rose–Hulman $	4	–	0	–	0	8	–	2	–	0
No. 13 Centre	3	–	1	–	0	8	–	1	–	0
Rhodes	2	–	2	–	0	6	–	3	–	0
Sewanee	1	–	3	–	0	2	–	7	–	0
Earlham	0	–	4	–	0	1	–	8	–	0
$ – Conference champion; Rankings from NCAA Division III poll

1986 College Conference of Illinois and Wisconsin football standings
	Conf.					Overall
Team	W		L		T	W		L		T
No. 6 Augustana (IL) $^	7	–	0	–	1	12	–	0	–	1
Millikin	6	–	2	–	0	7	–	2	–	0
Wheaton (IL)	6	–	2	–	0	7	–	2	–	0
Illinois Wesleyan	4	–	3	–	1	5	–	3	–	1
North Central (IL)	4	–	3	–	1	5	–	3	–	1
Carthage	3	–	5	–	0	3	–	6	–	0
Elmhurst	2	–	5	–	1	2	–	6	–	1
Carroll (WI)	2	–	6	–	0	2	–	7	–	0
North Park	0	–	8	–	0	0	–	9	–	0
$ – Conference champion; ^ – NCAA Division III playoff participant; Rankings from NCAA Division III poll

1986 Independent College Athletic Conference football standings
	Conf.					Overall
Team	W		L		T	W		L		T
No. 2 Ithaca $^	3	–	0	–	0	11	–	1	–	0
Alfred	2	–	1	–	0	9	–	2	–	0
Hobart	2	–	2	–	0	5	–	4	–	0
St. Lawrence	1	–	3	–	0	3	–	5	–	1
RPI	0	–	2	–	0	3	–	7	–	0
$ – Conference champion; ^ – NCAA Division III playoff participant; Rankings from NCAA Division III poll

1986 Iowa Conference football standings
	Conf.					Overall
Team	W		L		T	W		L		T
No. 3 Central (IA) $^	8	–	0	–	0	11	–	1	–	0
No. T–15 Buena Vista ^	7	–	1	–	0	9	–	2	–	0
Luther	6	–	2	–	0	7	–	3	–	0
Loras	5	–	3	–	0	6	–	5	–	0
Wartburg	4	–	4	–	0	5	–	5	–	0
William Penn	3	–	5	–	0	3	–	6	–	1
Dubuque	2	–	6	–	0	2	–	9	–	0
Simpson (IA)	1	–	7	–	0	1	–	8	–	0
Upper Iowa	0	–	8	–	0	0	–	9	–	0
$ – Conference champion; ^ – NCAA Division III playoff participant; Rankings from NCAA Division III poll

1986 Liberty Football Conference standings
	Conf.					Overall
Team	W		L		T	W		L		T
Merchant Marine $	4	–	1	–	0	8	–	2	–	0
Fordham	3	–	1	–	1	4	–	5	–	1
St. John's	3	–	2	–	0	6	–	4	–	0
Pace	2	–	2	–	1	5	–	4	–	1
C. W. Post	2	–	3	–	0	2	–	7	–	0
Iona	0	–	5	–	0	0	–	11	–	0
$ – Conference champion

1986 Michigan Intercollegiate Athletic Association football standings
	Conf.					Overall
Team	W		L		T	W		L		T
No. 11 Hope $^	4	–	0	–	1	7	–	2	–	1
Adrian	4	–	1	–	0	8	–	1	–	0
Albion	3	–	1	–	1	6	–	2	–	1
Alma	2	–	3	–	0	5	–	4	–	0
Kalamazoo	1	–	4	–	0	1	–	8	–	0
Olivet	0	–	5	–	0	3	–	6	–	0
$ – Conference champion; ^ – NCAA Division III playoff participant; Rankings from NCAA Division III poll

1986 Middle Atlantic Conference football standings
	Conf.					Overall
Team	W		L		T	W		L		T
No. 7 Susquehanna $^	9	–	0	–	0	11	–	1	–	0
Juniata	7	–	2	–	0	9	–	2	–	0
Lycoming	7	–	2	–	0	7	–	2	–	0
Wilkes	6	–	3	–	0	6	–	3	–	0
Widener	6	–	3	–	0	7	–	4	–	0
Moravian	3	–	5	–	1	4	–	5	–	1
Delaware Valley	3	–	5	–	1	3	–	6	–	1
Albright	2	–	7	–	0	3	–	7	–	0
Lebanon Valley	1	–	8	–	0	2	–	8	–	0
Upsala	0	–	9	–	0	2	–	9	–	0
$ – Conference champion; ^ – NCAA Division III playoff participant; Rankings from NCAA Division III poll

1986 Midwest Conference football standings
	Conf.					Overall
Team	W		L		T	W		L		T
North Division
Lawrence xy	6	–	1	–	0	8	–	2	–	0
Lake Forest	4	–	3	–	0	5	–	3	–	0
Beloit	3	–	4	–	0	4	–	5	–	0
St. Norbert	3	–	4	–	0	3	–	6	–	0
Chicago	2	–	5	–	0	3	–	6	–	0
Ripon	2	–	5	–	0	2	–	7	–	0
South Division
Coe xy$	7	–	0	–	0	9	–	1	–	0
Monmouth (IL)	6	–	1	–	0	8	–	1	–	0
Cornell (IA)	4	–	3	–	0	5	–	4	–	0
Knox	3	–	4	–	0	3	–	5	–	1
Grinnell	2	–	5	–	0	3	–	5	–	0
Illinois College	0	–	7	–	0	1	–	8	–	0
Championship: Lawrence 14, Coe 10
$ – Conference champion; x – Division champion/co-champions; y – Championship game participant

1986 Minnesota Intercollegiate Athletic Conference football standings
	Conf.					Overall
Team	W		L		T	W		L		T
No. 10 Concordia–Moorhead $^	9	–	0	–	0	11	–	2	–	0
Macalester	6	–	2	–	1	7	–	2	–	1
Carleton	6	–	3	–	0	7	–	3	–	0
St. Thomas (MN)	6	–	3	–	0	7	–	3	–	0
Saint John's (MN)	4	–	4	–	1	4	–	4	–	1
St. Olaf	4	–	5	–	0	5	–	5	–	0
Gustavus Adolphus	4	–	5	–	0	4	–	6	–	0
Hamline	4	–	5	–	0	4	–	6	–	0
Augsburg	1	–	8	–	0	1	–	9	–	0
Bethel (MN)	0	–	9	–	0	1	–	9	–	0
$ – Conference champion; ^ – NCAA Division III playoff participant; Rankings from NCAA Division III poll

1986 New England Football Conference standings
	Conf.					Overall
Team	W		L		T	W		L		T
Plymouth State $	8	–	0	–	1	9	–	1	–	1
Curry	8	–	1	–	0	8	–	1	–	0
Bridgewater State	6	–	1	–	2	6	–	1	–	2
Framingham State	6	–	3	–	0	6	–	4	–	0
Westfield State	5	–	4	–	0	5	–	4	–	0
Massachusetts Maritime	5	–	4	–	1	5	–	4	–	1
Worcester State	4	–	5	–	0	4	–	5	–	0
Nichols	3	–	6	–	0	3	–	6	–	0
Western New England	2	–	7	–	0	2	–	7	–	0
Maine Maritime	1	–	8	–	0	1	–	9	–	0
Fitchburg State	0	–	9	–	0	0	–	9	–	0
$ – Conference champion

1986 New England Small College Athletic Conference football standings
	Conf.					Overall
Team	W		L		T	W		L		T
Tufts	6	–	1	–	0	7	–	1	–	0
Hamilton	5	–	1	–	0	5	–	3	–	0
Amherst	6	–	2	–	0	6	–	2	–	0
Trinity (CT)	4	–	3	–	0	5	–	3	–	0
Williams	4	–	3	–	0	4	–	4	–	0
Middlebury	3	–	3	–	0	4	–	4	–	0
Wesleyan	3	–	4	–	0	3	–	5	–	0
Bates	2	–	5	–	0	2	–	6	–	0
Bowdoin	1	–	6	–	0	2	–	6	–	0
Colby	0	–	6	–	0	1	–	7	–	0
The NESCAC did not recognize an official conference champion until 2000

1986 New Jersey Athletic Conference football standings
	Conf.					Overall
Team	W		L		T	W		L		T
No. 8 Montclair State $^	6	–	0	–	0	10	–	2	–	0
Glassboro State	4	–	2	–	0	5	–	5	–	0
William Paterson	3	–	2	–	1	6	–	3	–	1
Jersey City State	3	–	3	–	0	6	–	4	–	0
Trenton State	3	–	3	–	0	4	–	6	–	0
Kean	1	–	5	–	0	3	–	7	–	0
Ramapo	0	–	5	–	1	0	–	9	–	1
$ – Conference champion; ^ – NCAA Division III playoff participant; Rankings from NCAA Division III poll

1986 North Coast Athletic Conference football standings
	Conf.					Overall
Team	W		L		T	W		L		T
No. T–15 Denison $	6	–	0	–	0	9	–	1	–	0
Case Western Reserve	5	–	1	–	0	7	–	1	–	1
Allegheny	4	–	2	–	0	6	–	4	–	0
Wooster	3	–	3	–	0	4	–	5	–	0
Kenyon	2	–	4	–	0	4	–	6	–	0
Oberlin	1	–	5	–	0	2	–	8	–	0
Ohio Wesleyan	0	–	6	–	0	0	–	10	–	0
$ – Conference champion; Rankings from NCAA Division III poll

1986 Ohio Athletic Conference football standings
	Conf.					Overall
Team	W		L		T	W		L		T
No. 4 Mount Union $^	8	–	0	–	0	11	–	1	–	0
Baldwin–Wallace	6	–	2	–	0	7	–	3	–	0
Muskingum	6	–	2	–	0	7	–	3	–	0
Wittenberg	5	–	3	–	0	7	–	3	–	0
Marietta	4	–	4	–	0	6	–	4	–	0
Heidelberg	3	–	5	–	0	5	–	5	–	0
Capital	3	–	5	–	0	4	–	5	–	0
Otterbein	1	–	7	–	0	1	–	9	–	0
Ohio Northern	0	–	8	–	0	0	–	9	–	0
$ – Conference champion; ^ – NCAA Division III playoff participant; Rankings from NCAA Division III poll

1986 Old Dominion Athletic Conference football standings
	Conf.					Overall
Team	W		L		T	W		L		T
No. 14 Emory & Henry $^	5	–	0	–	0	10	–	2	–	0
Hampden–Sydney	4	–	1	–	0	8	–	2	–	0
Randolph–Macon	3	–	2	–	0	7	–	3	–	0
Maryville (TN)	1	–	4	–	0	3	–	7	–	0
Bridgewater	1	–	4	–	0	2	–	6	–	1
Washington and Lee	1	–	4	–	0	2	–	7	–	0
$ – Conference champion; ^ – NCAA Division III playoff participant; Rankings from NCAA Division III poll

1986 Presidents' Athletic Conference football standings
	Conf.					Overall
Team	W		L		T	W		L		T
No. 18 Washington & Jefferson $^	6	–	0	–	0	8	–	2	–	0
Carnegie Mellon	4	–	2	–	0	6	–	3	–	0
Grove City	4	–	2	–	0	5	–	4	–	0
Hiram	3	–	3	–	0	5	–	3	–	1
John Carroll	2	–	4	–	0	2	–	7	–	0
Thiel	1	–	5	–	0	1	–	7	–	0
Bethany (WV)	1	–	5	–	0	1	–	8	–	0
$ – Conference champion; ^ – NCAA Division III playoff participant; Rankings from NCAA Division III poll

1986 Southern California Intercollegiate Athletic Conference football standings
	Conf.					Overall
Team	W		L		T	W		L		T
No. 19 Claremont-Mudd $	4	–	1	–	0	8	–	1	–	0
La Verne	3	–	1	–	1	6	–	3	–	0
Occidental	3	–	1	–	1	5	–	3	–	1
Whittier	2	–	2	–	1	5	–	5	–	0
Pomona-Pitzer	1	–	3	–	1	3	–	6	–	0
Redlands	0	–	5	–	0	0	–	10	–	0
$ – Conference champion; Each team played one other conference member twice. A head-to-head sweep of the two games counted as one win for the winner and one loss for the loser in the conference standings. A split of the two games counted as a tie for each team.; Rankings from NCAA Division III poll

1986 Southern Intercollegiate Athletic Conference football standings
	Conf.					Overall
Team	W		L		T	W		L		T
Division II
No. 18 Albany State x	6	–	1	–	0	9	–	2	–	0
No. 15 Fort Valley State	5	–	2	–	0	7	–	3	–	0
Savannah State	3	–	3	–	0	6	–	4	–	0
Alabama A&M	2	–	2	–	1	5	–	4	–	1
Morehouse	2	–	4	–	0	4	–	5	–	1
Tuskegee	2	–	5	–	1	3	–	7	–	1
Morris Brown	1	–	5	–	1	2	–	7	–	1
Clark	0	–	6	–	0	1	–	9	–	0
Division III
Knoxville x	8	–	1	–	0	4	–	0	–	0
Lane	2	–	2	–	0	4	–	6	–	0
Miles	0	–	4	–	0	0	–	11	–	0
x – Division champion/co-champions; Rankings from 1986 NCAA Division II football rankings

1986 Wisconsin State University Conference football standings
	Conf.					Overall
Team	W		L		T	W		L		T
No. 2 Wisconsin–La Crosse +*	7	–	1	–	0	10	–	2	–	0
Wisconsin–River Falls +	7	–	1	–	0	8	–	2	–	0
No. T–15 Wisconsin–Stevens Point +^	7	–	1	–	0	8	–	4	–	0
Wisconsin–Whitewater	4	–	3	–	1	6	–	3	–	1
Wisconsin–Platteville	3	–	5	–	0	6	–	5	–	0
Wisconsin–Eau Claire	3	–	5	–	0	4	–	6	–	0
Wisconsin–Stout	2	–	5	–	1	2	–	8	–	1
Wisconsin–Oshkosh	2	–	6	–	0	4	–	6	–	0
Wisconsin–Superior	0	–	8	–	0	1	–	9	–	0
+ – Conference co-champions; ^ – NCAA Division III playoff participant; * – NAIA Division II playoff participant; Rankings from NAIA Division II poll for Wisconsin–La Crosse and NCAA Division III poll for Wisconsin–Stevens Point

1986 NCAA Division III independents football records
	Conf.			Overall
Team	W	L	T	W		L		T
No. 5 Salisbury State ^		–		13	–	1	–	0
No. 1 Dayton ^		–		10	–	1	–	0
No. 9 Union (NY) ^		–		9	–	1	–	0
Villanova		–		8	–	1	–	0
No. 20 Buffalo		–		9	–	2	–	0
No. 12 Hofstra ^		–		9	–	2	–	0
Wagner		–		9	–	2	–	0
Millsaps		–		7	–	2	–	0
MacMurray		–		6	–	3	–	0
Wabash		–		6	–	3	–	0
WPI		–		5	–	3	–	0
Duquesne		–		5	–	3	–	1
DePauw		–		6	–	4	–	0
Mercyhurst		–		6	–	4	–	0
Western Connecticut State		–		6	–	4	–	0
Bishop		–		6	–	4	–	1
Canisius		–		5	–	4	–	0
Colorado College		–		5	–	4	–	0
Stony Brook		–		5	–	4	–	0
Georgetown		–		4	–	4	–	0
Menlo		–		4	–	4	–	1
Fairleigh Dickinson–Florham		–		4	–	5	–	0
Saint Francis (PA)		–		4	–	5	–	0
Drake		–		3	–	4	–	0
UC Santa Barbara		–		4	–	5	–	0
Albany		–		4	–	6	–	0
Brockport		–		4	–	6	–	0
Brooklyn		–		4	–	6	–	0
San Diego		–		4	–	6	–	0
Marist		–		3	–	5	–	0
Samford		–		3	–	6	–	0
Frostburg State		–		3	–	7	–	0
Lowell		–		2	–	7	–	0
Washington (MO)		–		2	–	7	–	0
Ferrum		–		3	–	8	–	0
Catholic University		–		2	–	8	–	1
Aurora		–		1	–	4	–	0
Norwich		–		2	–	8	–	0
Rochester (NY)		–		1	–	7	–	1
Buffalo State		–		1	–	8	–	0
Cortland		–		1	–	8	–	0
Saint Peter's		–		0	–	8	–	0
Wesley		–		0	–	8	–	0
^ – NCAA Division III playoff participant; Rankings from NCAA Division III poll

== Conference champions ==
Conference champions
- Centennial Conference – Franklin & Marshall and Muhlenberg
- College Athletic Conference – Rose–Hulman
- College Conference of Illinois and Wisconsin – Augustana (IL)
- Independent College Athletic Conference – Ithaca
- Iowa Intercollegiate Athletic Conference – Central (IA)
- Michigan Intercollegiate Athletic Association – Hope
- Middle Atlantic Conference – Susquehanna
- Midwest Collegiate Athletic Conference – Lawrence
- Minnesota Intercollegiate Athletic Conference – Concordia–Moorhead
- New England Football Conference – Plymouth State
- New Jersey State Athletic Conference – Montclair State
- North Coast Athletic Conference – Denison
- Ohio Athletic Conference – Mount Union
- Old Dominion Athletic Conference – Emory & Henry
- Presidents' Athletic Conference – Washington & Jefferson
- Southern California Intercollegiate Athletic Conference – Claremont–Mudd–Scripps
- Southern Intercollegiate Athletic Conference - Knoxville
- Texas Intercollegiate Athletic Association – Tarleton State
- Upper Midwest Athletic Conference – Northwestern–St. Paul
- Wisconsin Intercollegiate Athletic Conference – Wisconsin–La Crosse, Wisconsin–River Falls, and Wisconsin–Stevens Point

== Postseason ==
The 1986 NCAA Division III Football Championship playoffs were the 14th annual single-elimination tournament to determine the national champion of men's NCAA Division III college football. The championship Stagg Bowl game was held at Garrett-Harrison Stadium in Phenix City, Alabama for the twelfth time and for the second consecutive year. Like the previous tournament, this year's bracket featured sixteen teams.

=== Playoff bracket ===
First Round; Campus Sites
Ithaca (OT)	24
Union (NY)	17
Montclair State	24
Hofstra	21
Susquehanna	28
Washington & Jefferson	20
Salisbury State	34
Emory and Henry	20
Mount Union	42
Dayton	36
Augustana (IL)	34
Hope	10
Central (IA)	37
Buena Vista	0
Concordia–Moorhead	24
Wisconsin–Stevens Point	15

Quarterfinals; Campus Sites
Ithaca	29
Montclair State	15
Susquehanna	17
Salisbury State	31
Mount Union	7
Augustana (IL)	16
Central (IA)	14
Concordia–Moorhead	17

Semifinals; Campus Sites
Ithaca	40
Salisbury State	44
Augustana (IL)	41
Concordia–Moorhead	7

National Championship Game; Garrett-Harrison Stadium; Phenix City, Alabama
Salisbury State	3
Augustana (IL)	31

== See also ==
- 1986 NCAA Division I-A football season
- 1986 NCAA Division I-AA football season
- 1986 NCAA Division II football season
