= Hope Township, Midland County, Michigan =

Hope Township, Michigan
- Civil township
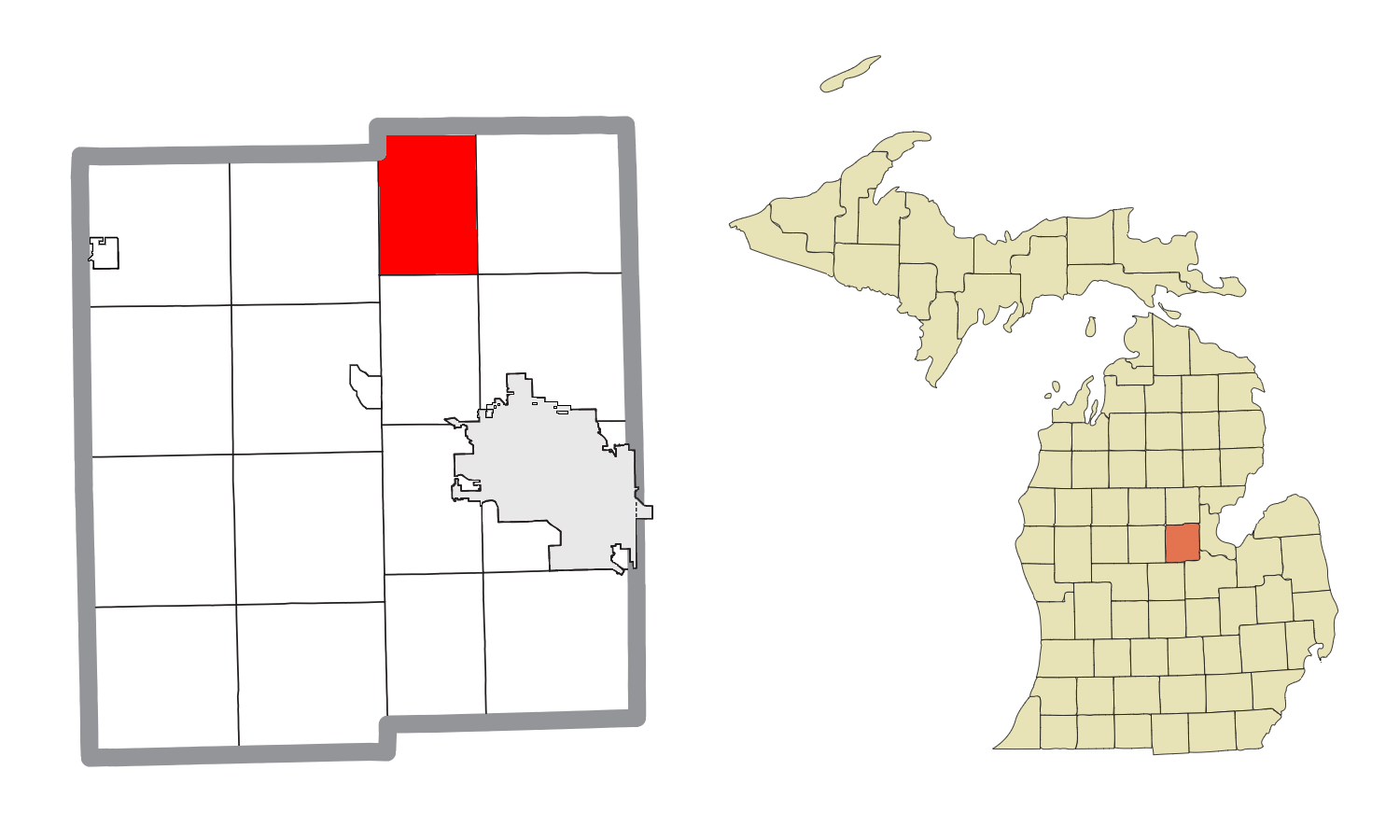
- Location within Midland County and the state of Michigan

- Location within Michigan Location within the United States
- Coordinates: 43°47′03″N 84°19′38″W
- Country: United States
- State: Michigan
- County: Midland
- Established: 1871

Government
  - Supervisor: Andrew Kobisa
  - Clerk: JoAnn Wilkie

Area
  - Total: 23.35 sq mi (60.5 km^{2})
  - Land: 23.02 sq mi (59.6 km^{2})
  - Water: 0.33 sq mi (0.85 km^{2})
- Elevation: 682 ft (208 m)

Population (2020)
  - Total: 1,373
  - Density: 59.6/sq mi (23.0/km^{2})
- Time zone: UTC-5 (Eastern (EST))
  - Summer (DST): UTC-4 (EDT)
- ZIP Code: 48628 (Hope)
- Area code: 989
- FIPS code: 26-111-39160
- GNIS feature ID: 1626489
- Website: hopetwp.org

Hope Township is a civil township of Midland County in the U.S. state of Michigan. The population was 1,373 at the 2020 census.

== Communities ==
- Hope is an unincorporated community and post office in the township centered on the junction of N Hope Road and E Hull Road at 43°45′52″N 84°20′17″W. The Hope ZIP code, 48628, serves the township. The first settlers, Orrin Maltby and Joseph Rooker, arrived in 1856. The first township meeting was in 1871, and a post office was established in May of the same year.

== Geography ==
Hope Township is in northern Midland County, bordered to the north by Gladwin County. According to the United States Census Bureau, the township has a total area of 23.4 square miles (61 km^{2}), of which 23.0 square miles (60 km^{2}) are land and 0.3 square miles (0.78 km^{2}), or 1.42%, are water. The Tittabawassee River crosses the northwest corner of the township and until a 2020 dam failure was impounded as Wixom Lake.

== Demographics ==
Historical population
Census	Pop.	Note	%±
1880	455		—
1890	655		44.0%
1900	752		14.8%
1910	751		−0.1%
1920	659		−12.3%
1930	607		−7.9%
1940	674		11.0%
1950	582		−13.6%
1960	754		29.6%
1970	945		25.3%
1980	1,249		32.2%
1990	1,220		−2.3%
2000	1,286		5.4%
2010	1,361		5.8%
2020	1,373		0.9%
U.S. Decennial Census

As of the census of 2000, there were 1,286 people, 508 households, and 390 families residing in the township. The population density was 55.8 inhabitants per square mile (21.5/km^{2}). There were 604 housing units at an average density of 26.2 per square mile (10.1/km^{2}). The racial makeup of the township was 97.51% White, 1.01% African American, 0.23% Native American, 0.08% Asian, 0.08% Pacific Islander, 0.31% from other races, and 0.78% from two or more races. Hispanic or Latino of any race were 0.62% of the population.

There were 508 households, out of which 27.6% had children under the age of 18 living with them, 68.3% were married couples living together, 3.9% had a female householder with no husband present, and 23.2% were non-families. 19.1% of all households were made up of individuals, and 7.3% had someone living alone who was 65 years of age or older. The average household size was 2.53 and the average family size was 2.88.

In the township the population was spread out, with 23.0% under the age of 18, 5.6% from 18 to 24, 28.2% from 25 to 44, 29.5% from 45 to 64, and 13.7% who were 65 years of age or older. The median age was 41 years. For every 100 females, there were 106.4 males. For every 100 females age 18 and over, there were 109.3 males.

The median income for a household in the township was $45,313, and the median income for a family was $50,365. Males had a median income of $38,125 versus $24,911 for females. The per capita income for the township was $23,660. About 2.3% of families and 3.3% of the population were below the poverty line, including 2.4% of those under age 18 and 5.4% of those age 65 or over.

== Notable people ==
- Sara Lee, WWE Tough Enough winner (Season 6)
