= Albion, Michigan =

Albion
- City
- Flag

- Location of Albion, Michigan

- Location within Michigan Location within the United States Location within North America
- Coordinates: 42°14′48″N 84°45′12″W
- Country: United States
- State: Michigan
- County: Calhoun

Area
  - Total: 4.50 sq mi (11.66 km^{2})
  - Land: 4.41 sq mi (11.42 km^{2})
  - Water: 0.093 sq mi (0.24 km^{2})
- Elevation: 950 ft (290 m)

Population (2020)
  - Total: 7,700
  - Density: 1,746.0/sq mi (674.14/km^{2})
- Time zone: UTC-5 (Eastern (EST))
  - Summer (DST): UTC-4 (EDT)
- ZIP code: 49224
- Area code: 517
- FIPS code: 26-00980
- GNIS feature ID: 0619906

Albion is a city in Calhoun County in the south central region of the Lower Peninsula of the U.S. state of Michigan. The population was 7,700 at the 2020 census. Albion is part of the Battle Creek Metropolitan Statistical Area.

The earliest English-speaking settlers also called this area The Forks, because it is at the confluence of the north and south branches of the Kalamazoo River. In the early 20th century, immigrants came to Albion from various eastern European nations, including the current Lithuania and Russia. More recently, Latino immigrants have come from Mexico and Central America. The Festival of the Forks has been held annually since 1967 to celebrate Albion's diverse ethnic heritage.

Since the 19th century, several major manufacturers were established in Albion, which became known as a factory town. This changed after several manufacturers closed. In the 21st century, Albion's culture is changing to that of a college town whose residents have a strong interest in technology and sustainability. Albion College is a private liberal arts college with a student population of about 1,250. Albion is a sister city with Noisy-le-Roi, France.

== History ==
The first European-American settler, Tenney Peabody, arrived in 1833 along with his brother-in-law, Charles Blanchard, and another young man, Clark Dowling. Peabody's family followed soon after. In 1835, the Albion Company, a land development company formed by Jesse Crowell, platted a village. Peabody's wife was asked to name the settlement. She considered the name "Peabodyville", but selected "Albion" instead, after the former residence of Jesse Crowell. Crowell was appointed in 1838 as the first US postmaster there.

Many early settlers migrated to Albion from western New York and New England, part of a movement after the construction of the Erie Canal and the opening of new lands in Michigan and other Great Lakes territories. They first developed agriculture and it became a rural trading village. Settlers were strong supporters of education and in 1835, Methodists established Albion College affiliated with their church. Its first classes were held in 1843. The college was known by a few other names before 1861. At that time it was fully authorized to confer four-year degrees on both men and women.

Albion incorporated as a village in 1855, following construction of the railroad here in 1852, which stimulated development. It became a city in 1885.

Mills were constructed to operate on the water power of the forks of the Kalamazoo River. They were the first industry in the town, used to process lumber, grain, and other products to build the village. Albion quickly became a mill town as well as an agricultural market. The river that powered industry also flooded the town.

In the Great Flood of 1908, there was severe property damage. In February, several feet of snow fell across the region. Heavy rains and warmer conditions in early March created water saturation in the ground and risk of flooding because of the rivers' high flow. After the Homer Dam broke around 3 p.m. on March 7, the Kalamazoo River flooded Albion. By midnight, the bridges surrounding town were underwater. Six buildings in Albion collapsed, resulting in more than $125,000 in damage (1908 dollars). The town struggled to recover.

In the late 19th and early 20th centuries, numerous Lithuanian and other Eastern European immigrants settled there, most working for the Albion Malleable Iron Company, and some in the coal mine north of town. The iron company initially made agricultural implements, but around World War I shifted to making automotive parts. The Malleable merged in 1969 with the Hayes Corporation, becoming the Hayes-Albion Corporation. Now known as a division of Harvard Industries, the company continues to produce automotive castings in Albion. Molder Statue Park downtown is dedicated to the many molders who dealt with molten iron.

There were soon enough Lithuanians in town to establish Holy Ascension Orthodox Church, which they built in 1916. It is part of the Orthodox Church in America. Today its services are in English.

Albion's population peaked in 1960. In 1973 Albion was named an All-America City by the National Civic League. It celebrated the award on May 15, 1974, when Michigan Governor William Milliken and many other dignitaries came to town. In 1975 the closure of a major factory began a difficult period of industrial restructuring and decline in jobs and population.

Since that time citizens have mobilized, founding the Albion Community Foundation in 1968. They formed the Albion Volunteer Service Organization in the 1980s, with support from Albion College, to address the challenge of diminishing economic opportunity.

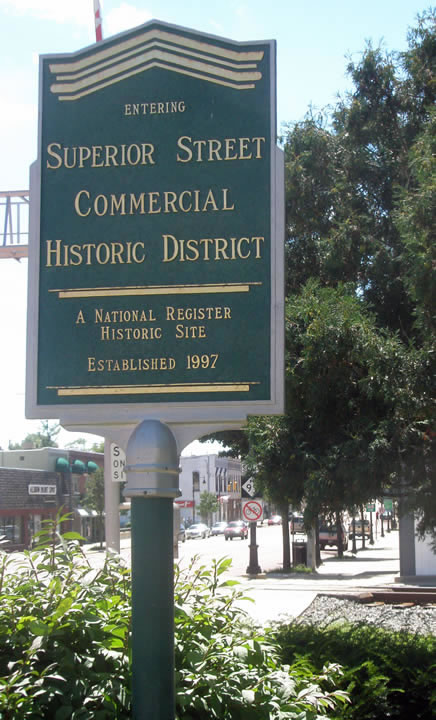
Albion's historic brick main street was first laid in 1903. It was reconstructed in 1993 with hand-laid, kiln-fired clay bricks.

Key to the City Honor Bestowed:

- 1964: Aunt Jemima visited Albion on January 25.
- 1960s: Columnist Ann Landers was presented with a key upon her visit to Starr Commonwealth for Boys.

== Law and government ==
Albion has a council-manager government. City residents elect a mayor at-large and City Council members from each of six single-member districts. The council in turn selects a city manager to handle the city's day-to-day affairs. The mayor presides over and is a voting member of the council. Council members are elected to four-year terms, staggered every two years. A mayor is elected every two years. The city levies an income tax of 1% on residents and 0.5% on nonresidents.

== Geography ==
According to the United States Census Bureau, the city has an area of 4.51 square miles (11.68 km^{2}), of which 4.41 square miles (11.42 km^{2}) is land and 0.10 square miles (0.26 km^{2}) is water. Albion is 42.24 degrees north of the equator and 84.75 degrees west of the prime meridian.

== Climate ==
Climate data for Albion
Month	Jan	Feb	Mar	Apr	May	Jun	Jul	Aug	Sep	Oct	Nov	Dec	Year
Average precipitation inches (mm)	2.62 (67)	1.91 (49)	2.08 (53)	3.25 (83)	4.12 (105)	4.06 (103)	4.20 (107)	4.15 (105)	3.27 (83)	3.49 (89)	2.72 (69)	2.42 (61)	38.29 (974)
Average snowfall inches (cm)	15.2 (39)	6.9 (18)	5.2 (13)	1.0 (2.5)	0.0 (0.0)	0.0 (0.0)	0.0 (0.0)	0.0 (0.0)	0.0 (0.0)	0.1 (0.25)	1.5 (3.8)	10.5 (27)	40.4 (103.55)
Average extreme snow depth inches (cm)	8.4 (21)	6.5 (17)	3.4 (8.6)	1.1 (2.8)	0.0 (0.0)	0.0 (0.0)	0.0 (0.0)	0.0 (0.0)	0.0 (0.0)	0.1 (0.25)	1.2 (3.0)	5.3 (13)	10.1 (26)
Average precipitation days (≥ 0.01 in)	12.5	9.0	8.8	11.6	12.3	10.6	9.9	10.4	9.5	11.4	10.5	11.7	128.2
Average snowy days (≥ 0.1 in)	6.1	4.0	2.3	0.4	0.0	0.0	0.0	0.0	0.0	0.0	1.0	4.3	18.1
Source 1: NOAA
Source 2: National Weather Service

== Demographics ==
Historical population
Census	Pop.	Note	%±
1850	881		—
1880	2,716		—
1890	3,763		38.5%
1900	4,519		20.1%
1910	5,833		29.1%
1920	8,354		43.2%
1930	8,324		−0.4%
1940	8,345		0.3%
1950	10,406		24.7%
1960	12,749		22.5%
1970	12,112		−5.0%
1980	11,059		−8.7%
1990	10,066		−9.0%
2000	9,144		−9.2%
2010	8,616		−5.8%
2020	7,700		−10.6%
Source: Census Bureau. Census 1960- 2000, 2010.

=== 2020 census ===
As of the 2020 census, Albion had a population of 7,700. The median age was 31.1 years. 23.2% of residents were under the age of 18 and 14.5% of residents were 65 years of age or older. For every 100 females there were 103.2 males, and for every 100 females age 18 and over there were 105.0 males age 18 and over.

99.5% of residents lived in urban areas, while 0.5% lived in rural areas.

There were 2,763 households in Albion, of which 31.2% had children under the age of 18 living in them. Of all households, 30.2% were married-couple households, 20.8% were households with a male householder and no spouse or partner present, and 40.3% were households with a female householder and no spouse or partner present. About 33.8% of all households were made up of individuals and 15.2% had someone living alone who was 65 years of age or older.

There were 3,248 housing units, of which 14.9% were vacant. The homeowner vacancy rate was 3.8% and the rental vacancy rate was 7.1%.

Racial composition as of the 2020 census
Race	Number	Percent
White	4,554	59.1%
Black or African American	2,213	28.7%
American Indian and Alaska Native	24	0.3%
Asian	90	1.2%
Native Hawaiian and Other Pacific Islander	4	0.1%
Some other race	179	2.3%
Two or more races	636	8.3%
Hispanic or Latino (of any race)	655	8.5%

=== 2010 census ===
==== Population by gender/age ====
Male	4,013	46.6%
Female	4,603	53.4%
Under 18	1,872	21.7%
18 and over	6,744	78.3%
20-24	1,364	15.8%
25-34	842	9.8%
35-49	1,251	14.5%
50-64	1,368	15.9%
65+	1,124	13.0%

==== Population by ethnicity ====
Hispanic or Latino	500	5.8%
Non Hispanic or Latino	8,116	94.2%

==== Population by race ====
White	5,477	63.6%
African American	2,579	29.9%
Asian	91	1.1%
American Indian and Alaska Native	29	0.3%
Native Hawaiian and Other Pacific Islander	17	0.2%
Other	90	1.0%
Identified by two or more	333	3.9%

== Transportation ==
=== Major highways ===
- I-94
- BL I-94
- M-99
- M-199

=== Rail ===
Amtrak provides daily service to Albion, operating its Wolverine both directions between Chicago, Illinois and Pontiac, Michigan, via Detroit.

=== Bus ===
Greyhound Lines provides daily intercity city bus service to Albion between Chicago and Detroit.

== Notable people ==
- Kim Cascone, musician, composer, owner of Silent Records; born in Albion
- M. F. K. Fisher, food writer, born in Albion
- Ada Iddings Gale, author, lived and buried in Albion
- Helen Rose Hull, author and university professor, was born in Albion. Her 1932 book Heat Lightning concerns a family that owns agricultural implement and automotive parts factories in a small town during the 1930s.
- Frank Joranko, football player and coach for Albion College
- LaVall Jordan, head men's basketball coach for Butler University, born in Albion
- Martin Wells Knapp, American Methodist evangelist who founded the Pilgrim Holiness Church and God's Bible School and College, born in Albion.
- Bill Laswell, jazz bassist, record producer and record label owner; raised in Albion
- Jerome D. Mack, banker, director of Las Vegas hotels Riviera and Dunes, founder of University of Nevada, Las Vegas; born in Albion
- Deacon McGuire, professional baseball player for 26 seasons, lived in Albion
- Harlan Jerome Miner, Minnesota state representative who was born in Albion
- Gary Lee Nelson, composer, pioneer in electronic and computer music; grew up in Albion
- John Sinclair, poet and political activist, attended Albion College
- Jon Scieszka, children's author, attended Albion College
- Brian Tyler, racing driver, born in Albion
- Jack Vaughn, Assistant Secretary of State, Ambassador to Panama and Colombia, and Director of the Peace Corps (1966–1969); grew up in Albion
- The War and Treaty, musical duo

== See also ==
- Holy Ascension Orthodox Church
