= 1984 NCAA Division III football season =

American college football season

- Regular season: August – November 1984
- Playoffs: November – December 1984
- National championship: Galbreath Field; Kings Island, Mason, Ohio
- Champion: Augustana (IL) (2)

The 1984 NCAA Division III football season, part of college football in the United States organized by the National Collegiate Athletic Association at the Division III level, began in August 1984, and concluded with the NCAA Division III Football Championship, also known as the Stagg Bowl, in December 1984 at Galbreath Field in Kings Island, Mason, Ohio. The Augustana (IL) Vikings won the second of their four consecutive Division III championships by defeating the Central (Iowa) Dutch by a final score of 21−12.

== Conference and program changes ==
=== Conference changes ===
- The North Coast Athletic Conference began football play in 1984.

School	1983 Conference	1984 Conference
Earlham	HBC (NAIA)	CAC
Fitchburg State	Club Program	D-III Independent
Fisk	CAC	Dropped Program
Case Western Reserve	PAC	NCAC
Catholic	ODAC	Independent
Denison	OAC	NCAC
Kenyon	OAC	NCAC
Oberlin	OAC	NCAC
Ohio Wesleyan	OAC	NCAC
Principia	CAC	D-III Independent
Wooster	OAC	NCAC
Allegheny	PAC	NCAC
Grove City	D-III Independent	PAC
Samford	Revived Program	D-III Independent
Stony Brook	New Program	D-III Independent

=== Program changes ===
- Fisk University closed its football program.
- After Southwestern University at Memphis changed its name to Rhodes College in 1984, the Southwestern Lynx became the Rhodes Lynx at the start of the 1984 season.
- The Villanova University football program was officially reinstated with St. Lawrence University head coach Andy Talley hired to the same position, as a Division III program. The program simply practiced and redshirted the entire team in preparation for a 1985 launch as a limited-season team.
- Samford revived their football program after cutting it in 1973.
- Stony Brook began their football program in 1984.

== Conference standings ==
1984 Centennial Conference football standings
	Conf.					Overall
Team	W		L		T	W		L		T
Swarthmore +	6	–	1	–	0	8	–	1	–	0
Gettysburg +	6	–	1	–	0	8	–	2	–	0
Muhlenberg	5	–	2	–	0	6	–	3	–	0
Franklin & Marshall	4	–	3	–	0	5	–	4	–	0
Johns Hopkins	3	–	4	–	0	5	–	4	–	0
Ursinus	2	–	5	–	0	4	–	5	–	0
Western Maryland	2	–	5	–	0	3	–	6	–	0
Dickinson	0	–	7	–	0	1	–	9	–	0
+ – Conference co-champions

1984 College Athletic Conference football standings
	Conf.					Overall
Team	W		L		T	W		L		T
Centre $	4	–	0	–	0	7	–	2	–	0
Rose–Hulman	3	–	1	–	0	4	–	5	–	0
Earlham	2	–	2	–	0	4	–	5	–	0
Rhodes	1	–	3	–	0	4	–	4	–	0
Sewanee	0	–	4	–	0	0	–	9	–	0
$ – Conference champion

1984 College Conference of Illinois and Wisconsin football standings
	Conf.					Overall
Team	W		L		T	W		L		T
Augustana (IL) $^	8	–	0	–	0	12	–	0	–	0
Millikin	7	–	1	–	0	7	–	2	–	0
Elmhurst	5	–	3	–	0	6	–	3	–	0
Wheaton (IL)	5	–	3	–	0	6	–	3	–	0
Illinois Wesleyan	5	–	3	–	0	5	–	4	–	0
Carroll (WI)	2	–	6	–	0	3	–	6	–	0
Carthage	2	–	6	–	0	2	–	7	–	0
North Central (IL)	2	–	6	–	0	2	–	7	–	0
North Park	0	–	8	–	0	0	–	9	–	0
$ – Conference champion; ^ – NCAA Division III playoff participant

1984 Independent College Athletic Conference football standings
	Conf.					Overall
Team	W		L		T	W		L		T
Ithaca $	3	–	0	–	0	10	–	1	–	0
Alfred	2	–	1	–	0	6	–	4	–	0
Hobart	2	–	2	–	0	5	–	4	–	0
RPI	1	–	1	–	0	5	–	4	–	0
St. Lawrence	0	–	4	–	0	1	–	8	–	0
$ – Conference champion

1984 Iowa Conference football standings
	Conf.					Overall
Team	W		L		T	W		L		T
Central (IA) $^	7	–	0	–	0	11	–	1	–	0
Wartburg	5	–	2	–	0	7	–	2	–	0
Buena Vista	5	–	2	–	0	7	–	3	–	0
Luther	4	–	3	–	0	5	–	3	–	0
William Penn	3	–	4	–	0	5	–	5	–	0
Dubuque	2	–	5	–	0	3	–	6	–	0
Simpson (IA)	1	–	6	–	0	2	–	7	–	0
Upper Iowa	1	–	6	–	0	1	–	9	–	0
$ – Conference champion; ^ – NCAA Division III playoff participant

1984 Metropolitan Intercollegiate Conference football standings
	Conf.					Overall
Team	W		L		T	W		L		T
St. John's $	4	–	0	–	0	8	–	2	–	0
Pace	3	–	1	–	0	4	–	5	–	0
Marist	2	–	2	–	0	3	–	7	–	0
Brooklyn	1	–	3	–	0	3	–	8	–	0
Saint Peter's	0	–	4	–	0	0	–	10	–	0
$ – Conference champion; Saint Peter's cancelled the remainder of their season after their first game and forfeited those nine remaining games.

1984 Michigan Intercollegiate Athletic Association football standings
	Conf.					Overall
Team	W		L		T	W		L		T
Hope $	5	–	0	–	0	9	–	0	–	0
Alma	4	–	1	–	0	6	–	3	–	0
Albion	3	–	2	–	0	5	–	4	–	0
Adrian	2	–	3	–	0	5	–	4	–	0
Olivet	1	–	4	–	0	1	–	8	–	0
Kalamazoo	0	–	5	–	0	1	–	8	–	0
$ – Conference champion

1984 Middle Atlantic Conference football standings
	Conf.					Overall
Team	W		L		T	W		L		T
Widener $	7	–	1	–	0	8	–	2	–	0
Lycoming	6	–	2	–	0	8	–	2	–	0
Moravian	6	–	2	–	0	7	–	2	–	0
Susquehanna	5	–	3	–	0	6	–	3	–	0
Delaware Valley	4	–	4	–	0	5	–	5	–	0
Upsala	3	–	5	–	0	4	–	6	–	0
Albright	2	–	6	–	0	3	–	6	–	0
Juniata	2	–	5	–	1	3	–	6	–	1
Wilkes	0	–	7	–	1	1	–	7	–	1
$ – Conference champion

1984 Midwest Conference football standings
	Conf.					Overall
Team	W		L		T	W		L		T
North Division
Beloit xy	6	–	1	–	0	8	–	2	–	0
St. Norbert	6	–	1	–	0	6	–	2	–	0
Lake Forest	5	–	2	–	0	6	–	2	–	0
Ripon	2	–	4	–	1	2	–	6	–	1
Lawrence	1	–	5	–	1	2	–	6	–	1
Chicago	1	–	6	–	0	3	–	6	–	0
South Division
Cornell (IA) xy$	6	–	1	–	0	8	–	2	–	0
Coe x	6	–	1	–	0	6	–	3	–	0
Monmouth (IL)	3	–	4	–	0	3	–	6	–	0
Grinnell	2	–	5	–	0	2	–	6	–	0
Knox	2	–	5	–	0	2	–	6	–	0
Illinois College	1	–	6	–	0	1	–	8	–	0
Championship: Cornell 31, Beloit 14
$ – Conference champion; x – Division champion/co-champions; y – Championship game participant

1984 Minnesota Intercollegiate Athletic Conference football standings
	Conf.					Overall
Team	W		L		T	W		L		T
Hamline $	8	–	0	–	1	9	–	0	–	1
Gustavus Adolphus	6	–	2	–	1	6	–	2	–	1
St. Thomas (MN)	6	–	2	–	1	6	–	3	–	1
Saint John's (MN)	6	–	3	–	0	6	–	3	–	0
St. Olaf	4	–	3	–	2	5	–	3	–	2
Macalester	4	–	5	–	0	6	–	5	–	0
Concordia–Moorhead	3	–	5	–	1	4	–	5	–	1
Carleton	2	–	6	–	0	3	–	7	–	0
Augsburg	2	–	7	–	0	2	–	8	–	0
Bethel (MN)	0	–	8	–	0	0	–	10	–	0
$ – Conference champion

1984 New England Football Conference standings
	Conf.					Overall
Team	W		L		T	W		L		T
Plymouth State $^	9	–	0	–	0	10	–	1	–	0
Western Connecticut State	8	–	1	–	0	9	–	1	–	0
Curry	7	–	2	–	0	7	–	2	–	0
Massachusetts Maritime	6	–	3	–	0	6	–	3	–	0
Westfield State	4	–	5	–	0	4	–	5	–	0
Maine Maritime	3	–	5	–	1	4	–	5	–	1
Bridgewater State	2	–	7	–	0	2	–	7	–	0
Nichols	2	–	7	–	0	2	–	7	–	0
Western New England	2	–	7	–	0	2	–	7	–	0
Framingham State	1	–	7	–	1	1	–	7	–	1
$ – Conference champion; ^ – NCAA Division III playoff participant

1984 New England Small College Athletic Conference football standings
	Conf.					Overall
Team	W		L		T	W		L		T
Amherst	8	–	0	–	0	8	–	0	–	0
Hamilton	4	–	1	–	1	6	–	1	–	1
Trinity (CT)	5	–	2	–	0	6	–	2	–	0
Wesleyan	4	–	2	–	1	5	–	2	–	1
Williams	3	–	4	–	0	3	–	5	–	0
Bowdoin	3	–	4	–	0	3	–	5	–	0
Colby	2	–	4	–	0	2	–	6	–	0
Bates	2	–	4	–	1	3	–	4	–	1
Middlebury	1	–	5	–	0	1	–	7	–	0
Tufts	0	–	6	–	1	0	–	7	–	1
The NESCAC did not recognize an official conference champion until 2000

1984 New Jersey State Athletic Conference football standings
	Conf.					Overall
Team	W		L		T	W		L		T
Montclair State $	6	–	0	–	0	7	–	3	–	0
Glassboro State	4	–	2	–	0	4	–	5	–	0
Kean	3	–	2	–	1	4	–	4	–	1
Ramapo	2	–	3	–	1	5	–	3	–	1
Jersey City State	2	–	4	–	0	5	–	4	–	0
Trenton State	2	–	4	–	0	3	–	7	–	0
William Paterson	1	–	5	–	0	2	–	8	–	0
$ – Conference champion

1984 North Coast Athletic Conference football standings
	Conf.					Overall
Team	W		L		T	W		L		T
Case Western Reserve $	6	–	0	–	0	9	–	0	–	0
Denison	4	–	2	–	0	8	–	2	–	0
Kenyon	4	–	2	–	0	7	–	3	–	0
Oberlin	3	–	3	–	0	4	–	6	–	0
Ohio Wesleyan	3	–	3	–	0	3	–	6	–	0
Allegheny	1	–	5	–	0	3	–	7	–	0
Wooster	0	–	6	–	0	0	–	9	–	0
$ – Conference champion

1984 Ohio Athletic Conference football standings
	Conf.					Overall
Team	W		L		T	W		L		T
Baldwin–Wallace $	8	–	0	–	0	9	–	1	–	0
Muskingum	7	–	1	–	0	9	–	1	–	0
Mount Union	5	–	3	–	0	6	–	4	–	0
Wittenberg	5	–	3	–	0	6	–	4	–	0
Capital	3	–	5	–	0	5	–	5	–	0
Heidelberg	3	–	5	–	0	3	–	7	–	0
Ohio Northern	2	–	5	–	1	2	–	6	–	1
Otterbein	2	–	6	–	0	3	–	7	–	0
Marietta	0	–	7	–	1	1	–	8	–	1
$ – Conference champion

1984 Old Dominion Athletic Conference football standings
	Conf.					Overall
Team	W		L		T	W		L		T
Randolph–Macon $^	5	–	0	–	0	9	–	2	–	0
Hampden–Sydney	3	–	2	–	0	8	–	2	–	0
Emory & Henry	3	–	2	–	0	6	–	4	–	0
Washington and Lee	2	–	3	–	0	6	–	4	–	0
Maryville (TN)	1	–	4	–	0	2	–	7	–	0
Bridgewater	1	–	4	–	0	1	–	8	–	0
$ – Conference champion; ^ – NCAA Division III playoff participant

1984 Presidents' Athletic Conference football standings
	Conf.					Overall
Team	W		L		T	W		L		T
Washington & Jefferson $^	6	–	0	–	0	9	–	2	–	0
Carnegie Mellon	5	–	1	–	0	6	–	3	–	0
Bethany (WV)	3	–	3	–	0	3	–	6	–	0
John Carroll	2	–	4	–	0	4	–	5	–	0
Grove City	2	–	4	–	0	3	–	6	–	0
Hiram	2	–	4	–	0	3	–	6	–	0
Thiel	1	–	5	–	0	3	–	6	–	0
$ – Conference champion; ^ – NCAA Division III playoff participant

1984 Southern California Intercollegiate Athletic Conference football standings
	Conf.					Overall
Team	W		L		T	W		L		T
Occidental $^	5	–	0	–	0	10	–	1	–	0
Whittier	3	–	1	–	1	6	–	4	–	0
La Verne	2	–	1	–	2	6	–	3	–	0
Redlands	1	–	3	–	1	5	–	5	–	0
Claremont-Mudd	1	–	3	–	1	3	–	5	–	1
Pomona-Pitzer	0	–	4	–	1	1	–	6	–	1
$ – Conference champion; ^ – NCAA Division III playoff participant; Each team played two other conference members twice. A head-to-head sweep of the two games counted as one win for the winner and one loss for the loser in the conference standings. A split of the two games counted as a tie for each team.

1984 Wisconsin State University Conference football standings
	Conf.					Overall
Team	W		L		T	W		L		T
Wisconsin–River Falls +	7	–	1	–	0	8	–	2	–	0
Wisconsin–Whitewater +	7	–	1	–	0	8	–	3	–	0
No. 10 Wisconsin–La Crosse	6	–	2	–	0	8	–	2	–	0
No. 11 Wisconsin–Eau Claire	5	–	3	–	0	8	–	3	–	0
Wisconsin–Stevens Point	4	–	4	–	0	6	–	5	–	0
Wisconsin–Platteville	4	–	4	–	0	5	–	6	–	0
Wisconsin–Oshkosh	2	–	6	–	0	3	–	7	–	0
Wisconsin–Stout	1	–	7	–	0	2	–	9	–	0
Wisconsin–Superior	0	–	8	–	0	0	–	11	–	0
+ – Conference co-champions; Rankings from NAIA Division II poll

1984 NCAA Division III independents football records
	Conf.			Overall
Team	W	L	T	W		L		T
Dayton ^		–		10	–	1	–	0
Hofstra		–		9	–	1	–	0
Mercyhurst		–		8	–	1	–	0
Millsaps		–		8	–	1	–	0
Norwich		–		9	–	2	–	0
Union (NY) ^		–		9	–	2	–	0
Wabash		–		8	–	2	–	0
Bishop		–		7	–	2	–	0
Merchant Marine		–		7	–	2	–	1
Salisbury State		–		6	–	3	–	0
Frostburg State		–		6	–	3	–	1
Buffalo		–		6	–	4	–	0
DePauw		–		6	–	4	–	0
Wagner		–		6	–	4	–	0
WPI		–		5	–	3	–	0
Buffalo State		–		5	–	4	–	0
Catholic University		–		5	–	4	–	0
Lowell		–		5	–	4	–	0
Albany		–		5	–	5	–	0
Fordham		–		5	–	5	–	0
Fairleigh Dickinson–Florham		–		4	–	5	–	0
Stony Brook		–		4	–	5	–	0
Cortland		–		4	–	6	–	0
Duquesne		–		3	–	5	–	0
Canisius		–		2	–	8	–	0
Iona		–		2	–	8	–	0
San Diego		–		1	–	8	–	1
Georgetown		–		1	–	6	–	0
Saint Francis (PA)		–		1	–	7	–	0
Samford		–		1	–	7	–	0
Brockport		–		1	–	8	–	0
Colorado College		–		1	–	8	–	0
Rochester (NY)		–		1	–	8	–	0
Lebanon Valley		–		1	–	9	–	0
Fitchburg State		–		0	–	9	–	0
^ – NCAA Division III playoff participant

== Conference champions ==
Conference champions
- Centennial Conference – Gettysburg and Swarthmore
- College Athletic Conference – Centre
- College Conference of Illinois and Wisconsin – Augustana (IL)
- Independent College Athletic Conference – Ithaca
- Iowa Intercollegiate Athletic Conference – Central College (IA)
- Michigan Intercollegiate Athletic Association – Hope
- Middle Atlantic Conference – Widener
- Midwest Collegiate Athletic Conference – Cornell College
- Minnesota Intercollegiate Athletic Conference – Hamline
- New England Football Conference – Plymouth State
- New Jersey State Athletic Conference – Montclair State
- North Coast Athletic Conference – Case Western Reserve
- Northwest Conference – Linfield
- Ohio Athletic Conference – Baldwin Wallace
- Old Dominion Athletic Conference – Randolph-Macon
- Presidents' Athletic Conference – Washington & Jefferson
- Southern California Intercollegiate Athletic Conference – Occidental
- Texas Intercollegiate Athletic Association – Austin
- Upper Midwest Athletic Conference – Northwestern–St. Paul
- Wisconsin Intercollegiate Athletic Conference – Wisconsin–River Falls and Wisconsin–Whitewater

== Postseason ==
The 1984 NCAA Division III Football Championship playoffs were the 12th annual single-elimination tournament to determine the national champion of men's NCAA Division III college football. The championship Stagg Bowl game was held at Galbreath Field at the College Football Hall of Fame in Kings Island, Mason, Ohio for the second consecutive time. This was the final tournament to feature eight teams before expanding to sixteen in 1985.

=== Playoff bracket ===
Quarterfinals; Campus Sites
Union (NY)	26
Plymouth State	14
Augustana (IL)	14
Dayton	13
Washington & Jefferson	22
Randolph–Macon	21
Central (IA)	23
Occidental	22

Semifinals; Campus Sites
Union (NY)	6
Augustana (IL)	23
Washington & Jefferson	0
Central (IA)	20

National Championship Game; Galbreath Field; Kings Island, Mason, OH
Augustana (IL)	21
Central (IA)	12

== See also ==
- 1984 NCAA Division I-A football season
- 1984 NCAA Division I-AA football season
- 1984 NCAA Division II football season
