= 2023 American Rivers Conference football season =

- Sport: Football
- Teams: 9
- Champion: Wartburg

Football seasons
- ← 2022 2024 →

2023 American Rivers Conference football standings
	Conf.			Overall
Team	W		L	W		L
No. 3 Wartburg $^	8	–	0	13	–	1
Coe ^	7	–	1	9	–	2
Central (IA)	6	–	2	8	–	2
Dubuque	5	–	3	5	–	5
Loras	4	–	4	5	–	5
Nebraska Wesleyan	2	–	6	4	–	6
Simpson (IA)	2	–	6	3	–	7
Buena Vista	2	–	6	2	–	8
Luther	0	–	8	0	–	10
$ – Conference champion; ^ – NCAA Division III playoff participant; Rankings from D3Football.com

The 2023 American Rivers Conference football season was the season of college football played by the nine member schools of the American Rivers Conference (ARC) as part of the 2023 NCAA Division III football season. The 2023 Wartburg Knights football team compiled a 13–1 record (8–0 in conference games), won the ARC championship, and made it to the NCAA Division III semifinal where they lost to North Central (IL) 34–27.

== Teams ==
=== Wartburg ===
2023 Wartburg Knights football

ARC champion

NCAA Division III Semifinal, L 27–34 vs North Central
- Conference: American Rivers Conference

Ranking
- D3Football.com: No. 3
- Record: 13–1 (8–0 ARC)
- Head coach: Chris Winter (3rd season)
- Offensive coordinator: Matt Wheeler (13th season)
- Defensive coordinator: Matt Tschetter (3rd season)
- Home stadium: Walston-Hoover Stadium

The 2023 Wartburg Knights football team represented Wartburg College of Waverly, Iowa. In their third year under head coach Chris Winter, the team compiled a 13–1 record (8–0 against ARC opponents), won the ARC championship, and made it to the NCAA Division III semifinal where they lost to North Central (IL) 34–27.

Date	Opponent	Site	Result	Attendance	Source
September 2	Monmouth (IL)*	Walston-Hoover Stadium; Waverly, IA	W 62–35	3,756	
September 9	at No. 16 Bethel (MN)*	Royal Stadium; Arden Hills, MN	W 16–2	3,642	
September 16	Buena Vista	Walston-Hoover Stadium; Waverly, IA	W 47–0	2,137	
September 23	at Simpson	Buxton Stadium; Indianola, IA	W 63–0	1,524	
September 30	Coe	Walston-Hoover Stadium; Waverly, IA	W 27–21	3,106	
October 7	at Luther	Carlson Stadium; Decorah, IA	W 54–0	317	
October 14	Dubuque^{†}	Walston-Hoover Stadium; Waverly, IA	W 31–10	5,102	
October 21	at Loras	Rock Bowl; Dubuque, IA	W 62–7	1,300	
October 28	Central (IA)	Walston-Hoover Stadium; Waverly, IA	W 24–14	1,500	
November 4	at Nebraska Wesleyan	Abel Stadium; Lincoln, NE	W 45–0	1,200	
November 18	Illinois College	Walston-Hoover Stadium; Waverly, IA (NCAA Division III First Round)	W 49–14	1,355	
November 25	No. 20 Whitworth	Walston-Hoover Stadium; Waverly, IA (NCAA Division III Second Round)	W 42–20	1,207	
December 2	No. 5 Wisconsin–Whitewater	Walston-Hoover Stadium; Waverly, IA (NCAA Division III Quarterfinal)	W 31–28	3,259	
December 9	No. 1 North Central (IL)	Walston-Hoover Stadium; Waverly, IA (NCAA Division III Semifinal)	L 27–34	3,525	
*Non-conference game; ^{†}Homecoming; Rankings from Coaches' Poll released prior to the game

=== Coe ===
2023 Coe Kohawks football

NCAA Division III First Round, L 7–20 vs Aurora
- Conference: American Rivers Conference
- Record: 9–2 (7–1 ARC)
- Head coach: Tyler Staker (8th season)
- Offensive coordinator: Tyler Staker (16th season)
- Defensive coordinator: Cody Baethke (6th season)
- Home stadium: Clark Field

The 2023 Coe Kohawks football team represented Coe College of Cedar Rapids, Iowa. In their 8th year under head coach Tyler Staker, the team compiled a 9–2 record (7–1 against ARC opponents), finished second in the ARC, and made it to the NCAA Division III first round where they lost to Aurora 7–20.

Date	Opponent	Site	Result	Attendance	Source
September 2	at Cornell (IA)*	Van Metre Field; Mount Vernon, IA	W 56–6	1,360	
September 9	Wisconsin–Ear Claire*	Clark Field; Cedar Rapids, IA	W 44–14	850	
September 16	at Central (IA)	Schipper Stadium; Pella, IA	W 19–11	2,000	
September 23	Nebraska Wesleyan^{†}	Clark Field; Cedar Rapids, IA	W 56–6	672	
September 30	at No. 3 Wartburg	Walston-Hoover Stadium; Waverly, IA	L 21–27	3,106	
October 7	Buena Vista	Clark Field; Cedar Rapids, IA	W 52–7	479	
October 14	at Simpson	Buxton Stadium; Indianola, IA	W 28–0	1,462	
October 28	Luther	Clark Field; Cedar Rapids, IA	W 62–2	0	
November 4	at Dubuque	Chalmers Field; Dubuque, IA	W 23–20	875	
November 11	Loras	Clark Field; Cedar Rapids, IA	W 54–14	503	
November 18	at No. 12 Aurora	Spartan Athletic Park; Aurora, IL (NCAA Division III First Round)	L 7–20	2,189	
*Non-conference game; ^{†}Homecoming; Rankings from Coaches' Poll released prior to the game

=== Central (IA) ===
2023 Central Dutch football
- Conference: American Rivers Conference
- Record: 8–2 (6–2 ARC)
- Head coach: Jeff McMartin (20th season)
- Offensive coordinator: Ryan Maiuri (8th season)
- Defensive coordinator: Mitch Shepherd (3rd season)
- Home stadium: Schipper Stadium

The 2023 Central Dutch football team represented Central College of Pella, Iowa. In their 20th year under head coach Jeff McMartin, the team compiled an 8–2 record (6–2 against ARC opponents) and finished in third place in the ARC.

Date	Opponent	Site	Result	Attendance	Source
September 2	at St. Olaf*	Klein Field; Northfield, MN	W 34–24	912	
September 9	at Illinois Wesleyan*	Tucci Stadium; Bloomington, IL	W 38–13	1,338	
September 16	Coe	Schipper Stadium; Pella, IA	L 11–19	2,000	
September 23	at Luther	Carlson Stadium; Decorah, IA	W 41–16	681	
September 30	Dubuque	Schipper Stadium; Pella, IA	W 55–16	1,750	
October 7	at Loras	Rock Bowl; Dubuque, IA	W 38–14	1,500	
October 21	Nebraska Wesleyan	Schipper Stadium; Pella, IA	W 72–0	1,500	
October 29	at No. 3 Wartburg	Walston-Hoover Stadium; Waverly, IA	L 14–24	1,500	
November 4	Buena Vista	Schipper Stadium; Pella, IA	W 56–22	1,500	
November 11	at Simpson	Buxton Stadium; Indianola, IA	W 69–14	1,506	
*Non-conference game; Rankings from Coaches' Poll released prior to the game

=== Dubuque ===
2023 Dubuque Spartans football
- Conference: American Rivers Conference
- Record: 5–5 (5–3 ARC)
- Head coach: Stan Zweifel (15th season)
- Offensive coordinator: Miles Hookstead (3rd season)
- Defensive coordinator: Rob Huberty (3rd season)
- Home stadium: Chalmers Field

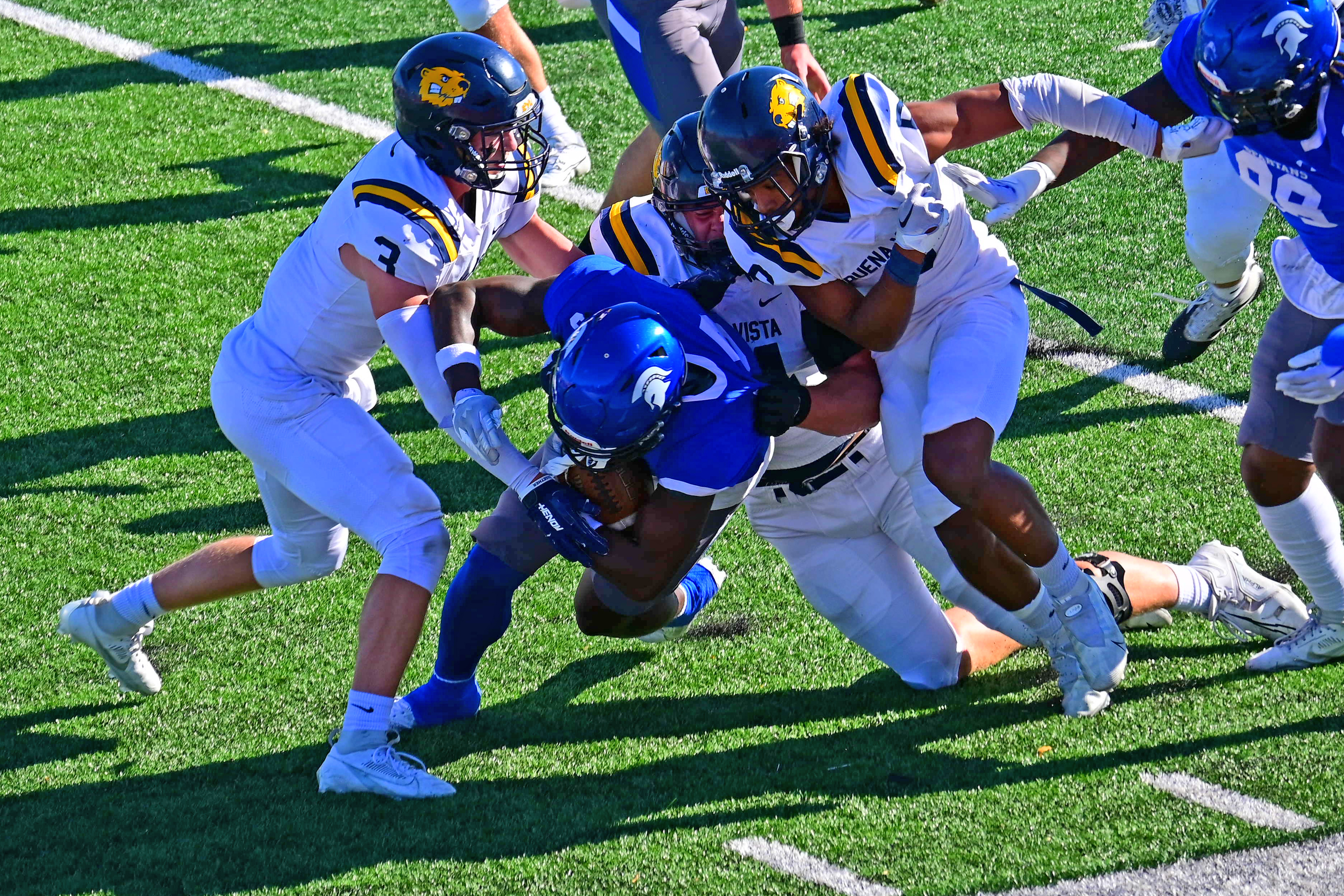
Buena Vista defenders tackle a Dubuque player during their 2023 game.

The 2023 Dubuque Spartans football team represented Dubuque College of Dubuque, Iowa. In their 15th year under head coach Stan Zweifel, the team compiled a 5–5 record (5–3 against ArC opponents) and finished in fourth place in the ARC.

Date	Opponent	Site	Result	Attendance	Source
September 2	Wittenberg*	Chalmers Field; Dubuque, IA	L 27–28	1,200	
September 9	Wisconsin–Platteville*	Chalmers Field; Dubuque, IA	L 19–35	4,850	
September 23	Loras	Chalmers Field; Dubuque, IA	W 35–23	4,250	
September 30	at Central (IA)	Schipper Stadium; Pella, IA	L 16–55	1,750	
October 7	Nebraska Wesleyan	Chalmers Field; Dubuque, IA	W 56–28	630	
October 14	at No. 3 Wartburg	Walston-Hoover Stadium; Waverly, IA	L 10–31	5,102	
October 21	Buena Vista^{†}	Chalmers Field; Dubuque, IA	W 41–0	2,315	
October 28	at Simpson	Buxton Stadium; Indianola, IA	W 45–21	1,377	
November 4	No. 24 Coe	Chalmers Field; Dubuque, IA	L 20–23	875	
November 11	at Luther	Carlson Stadium; Decorah, IA	W 42–10	195	
*Non-conference game; ^{†}Homecoming; Rankings from Coaches' Poll released prior to the game

=== Loras ===
2023 Loras Duhawks football
- Conference: American Rivers Conference
- Record: 5–5 (4–4 ARC)
- Head coach: Steve Helminiak (11th season)
- Offensive coordinator: Jake Olsen (11th season)
- Defensive coordinator: Greg Bower (6th season)
- Home stadium: Rock Bowl

The 2023 Loras Duhawks football team represented Loras College of Dubuque, Iowa. In their 11th year under head coach Steve Helminiak, the team compiled a 5–5 record (4–4 against ARC opponents) and finished in fifth place in the ARC.

Date	Opponent	Site	Result	Attendance	Source
September 2	Benedictine (IL)*	Rock Bowl; Dubuque, IA	W 42–41	1,750	
September 9	at Hope*	Ray & Sue Smith Stadium; Holland, MI	L 28–42	2,344	
September 16	Luther	Rock Bowl; Dubuque, IA	W 44–29	2,500	
September 23	at Dubuque	Chalmers Field; Dubuque, IA	L 23–35	4,250	
October 7	Central (IA)^{†}	Rock Bowl; Dubuque, IA	L 14–38	1,500	
October 14	at Nebraska Wesleyan	Abel Stadium; Lincoln, NE	W 41–38	275	
October 21	No. 3 Wartburg	Rock Bowl; Dubuque, IA	L 7–62	1,300	
October 28	at Buena Vista	Rollins Stadium; Storm Lake, IA	W 49–21	120	
November 4	Simpson	Rock Bowl; Dubuque, IA	W 82–16	1,250	
November 11	at No. 25 Coe	Clark Field; Cedar Rapids, IA	L 14–54	503	
*Non-conference game; ^{†}Homecoming; Rankings from Coaches' Poll released prior to the game

=== Nebraska Wesleyan ===
2023 Nebraska Wesleyan Prairie Wolves football
- Conference: American Rivers Conference
- Record: 4–6 (2–6 ARC)
- Head coach: Brian Keller (28th season)
- Defensive coordinator: William Lawrence (1st season)
- Home stadium: Abel Stadium

The 2023 Nebraska Wesleyan Prairie Wolves football team represented Nebraska Wesleyan University of Lincoln, Nebraska. In their 28th year under head coach Brian Keller, the team compiled a 4–6 record (2–6 against ARC opponents) and finished tied for sixth in the ARC.

Date	Opponent	Site	Result	Attendance	Source
September 2	at Austin*	Apple Stadium; Sherman, TX	W 19–7	1,253	
September 9	Mayville State*	Abel Stadium; Lincoln, NE	W 33–30	540	
September 16	Simpson	Abel Stadium; Lincoln, NE	W 21–13	350	
September 23	at Coe	Clark Field; Cedar Rapids, IA	L 6–56	672	
September 30	Luther^{†}	Abel Stadium; Lincoln, NE	W 35–10	500	
October 7	at Dubuque	Chalmers Field; Dubuque, IA	L 28–56	630	
October 14	Loras	Abel Stadium; Lincoln, NE	L 38–41 (2OT)	275	
October 21	at Central (IA)	Schipper Stadium; Pella, IA	L 0–72	1,500	
November 4	No. 3 Wartburg	Abel Stadium; Lincoln, NE	L 0–45	1,200	
November 11	at Buena Vista	Rollins Stadium; Storm Lake, IA	L 20–25	400	
*Non-conference game; ^{†}Homecoming; Rankings from Coaches' Poll released prior to the game

=== Simpson ===
2023 Simpson Storm football
- Conference: American Rivers Conference
- Record: 3–7 (2–6 ARC)
- Head coach: Reed Hoskins (1st season)
- Offensive coordinator: Robbie Aldinger (1st season)
- Defensive coordinator: Jason Martinez (1st season)
- Home stadium: Buxton Stadium

The 2023 Simpson Storm football team represented Simpson College of Indianola, Iowa. In their first year under head coach Reed Hoskins, the team compiled a 3–7 record (2–6 against ARC opponents) and finished tied for sixth in the ARC.

Date	Opponent	Site	Result	Attendance	Source
September 2	Augustana (IL)*	Buxton Stadium; Indianola, IA	L 27–49	1,452	
September 9	at Crown*	Old National Bank Stadium; St. Bonifacius, MN	W 48–46	455	
September 16	at Nebraska Wesleyan	Abel Stadium; Lincoln, NE	L 13–21	350	
September 23	No. 3 Wartburg	Buxton Stadium; Indianola, IA	L 0–63	1,387	
September 30	at Buena Vista	Rollins Stadium; Storm Lake, IA	W 55–28	400	
October 14	Coe^{†}	Buxton Stadium; Indianola, IA	L 0–28	1,462	
October 21	at Luther	Carlson Stadium; Decorah, IA	W 56–14	215	
October 28	Dubuque	Buxton Stadium; Indianola, IA	L 21–45	1,377	
November 4	at Loras	Rock Bowl; Dubuque, IA	L 16–82	1,250	
November 11	Central (IA)	Buxton Stadium; Indianola, IA	L 14–69	1,506	
*Non-conference game; ^{†}Homecoming; Rankings from Coaches' Poll released prior to the game

=== Buena Vista ===
2023 Buena Vista Beavers football
- Conference: American Rivers Conference
- Record: 2–8 (2–6 ARC)
- Head coach: Austin Dickinson (1st season)
- Offensive coordinator: Alex Johnson (1st season)
- Defensive coordinator: Mike Adams (1st season)
- Home stadium: Rollins Stadium

The 2023 Buena Vista Beavers football team represented Buena Vista University of Buena Vista, Iowa. In their first year under head coach Austin Dickinson, the team compiled a 2–8 record (2–6 against ARC opponents) and finished tied for sixth in the ARC.

Date	Opponent	Site	Result	Attendance	Source
September 2	at Gustavus Adolphus*	Hollingsworth Field; St. Peter, MN	L 7–51	2,137	
September 9	Lakeland*	Rollins Stadium; Storm Lake, IA	L 16–34	450	
September 16	at No. 3 Wartburg	Walston-Hoover Stadium; Waverly, IA	L 0–47	2,137	
September 30	Simpson	Rollins Stadium; Storm Lake, IA	L 28–55	400	
October 7	at Coe	Clark Field; Cedar Rapids, IA	L 7–52	479	
October 14	Luther^{†}	Rollins Stadium; Storm Lake, IA	W 17–10	600	
October 21	at Dubuque	Chalmers Field; Dubuque, IA	L 0–41	2,135	
October 28	Loras	Rollins Stadium; Storm Lake, IA	L 21–49	120	
November 4	at Central (IA)	Schipper Stadium; Pella, IA	L 22–56	1,500	
November 11	Nebraska Wesleyan	Rollins Stadium; Storm Lake, IA	W 25–20	400	
*Non-conference game; ^{†}Homecoming; Rankings from Coaches' Poll released prior to the game

=== Luther ===
2023 Luther Norse football
- Conference: American Rivers Conference
- Record: 0–10 (0–8 ARC)
- Head coach: Joe Troche (2nd season)
- Offensive coordinator: Tim Souza (2nd season)
- Home stadium: Carlson Stadium

The 2023 Luther Norse football team represented Luther College of Decorah, Iowa. In their second year under head coach Joe Troche, the team compiled a 0–10 record (0–8 against ARC opponents) and finished last in the ARC.

Date	Opponent	Site	Result	Attendance	Source
September 9	St. Olaf*	Carlson Stadium; Decorah, IA	L 21–52	559	
September 16	at Loras	Rock Bowl; Dubuque, IA	L 29–44	2,500	
September 23	Central	Carlson Stadium; Decorah, IA	L 16–41	681	
September 30	at Nebraska Wesleyan	Abel Stadium; Lincoln, NE	L 10–35	500	
October 7	No. 3 Wartburg	Carlson Stadium; Decorah, IA	L 0–54	317	
October 14	at Buena Vista	Rollins Stadium; Storm Lake, IA	L 10–17	600	
October 21	No. 3 Simpson	Carlson Stadium; Decorah, IA	L 14–56	215	
October 28	at Coe	Clark Field; Cedar Rapids, IA	L 2–64	0	
November 4	Lyon*	Carlson Stadium; Decorah, IA	L 21–28	157	
November 11	Dubuque	Carlson Stadium; Decorah, IA	L 10–42	195	
*Non-conference game; Rankings from Coaches' Poll released prior to the game
