= 2023 Cortland Red Dragons football team =

American college football season

2023 Cortland Red Dragons football

NCAA Division III National champion Empire 8 champion

Stagg Bowl, W 38–37 vs. North Central (IL)
- Conference: Empire 8

Ranking
- AFCA: No. 1
- D3Football.com: No. 1
- Record: 14–1 (6–0 Empire 8)
- Head coach: Curt Fitzpatrick (3rd season)
- Offensive coordinator: Patrick Rotchford (3rd season)
- Defensive coordinator: Steve Cushing (2nd season)
- Home stadium: Grady Field (6,500)

2023 Empire 8 Athletic Conference football standings
	Conf.			Overall
Team	W		L	W		L
No. 1 Cortland $^	6	–	0	14	–	1
Brockport	5	–	1	8	–	2
Utica	4	–	2	9	–	2
St. John Fisher	2	–	4	5	–	5
Alfred	2	–	4	4	–	6
Morrisville	2	–	4	4	–	6
Hartwick	0	–	6	1	–	9
$ – Conference champion; ^ – NCAA Division III playoff participant; Rankings from D3Football.com

The 2023 Cortland Red Dragons football team was an American football team that represented the State University of New York at Cortland as a member of the Empire 8 during the 2023 NCAA Division III football season. In their third year under head coach Curt Fitzpatrick, the Red Dragons compiled a 14–1 record (6–0 in conference games) and won both the Empire 8 championship and the NCAA Division III national championship. In the Division III playoffs, the Red Dragons defeated Endicott (23–17) in the first round, Grove City (25–24) in the second round, Alma (58–41) in the quarterfinals, and Randolph–Macon (49–14) in the semifinals and North Central (IL) (38–37) in the Stagg Bowl. It was Cortland's first Division III championship.

The Red Dragons outscored opponents by a total of 693 to 296 in 15 games. On offense, they scored an average of 46.2 points per game and gained an average of 509.2 yards per game (284 passing yards and 225 rushing yards). The team's individual statistical leaders included:

- Zac Boyes - 4,020 passing yards and 44 passing touchdowns with only five interceptions;
- Jaden AlfanoStJohn - 1,396 rushing yards and 17 rushing touchdowns;
- Cole Burgess - 87 receptions for 1,375 receiving yards and 16 receiving touchdowns;
- Mike Baloga - 130 points scored on 91 extra points and 13 field goals;
- Jack Winey - 141 total tackles;
- Nick Lardaro - 12.5 tackles for loss and 8.5 sacks; and
- Luke Winslow - five interceptions.

== Schedule ==
Date	Time	Opponent	Rank	Site	Result	Attendance	Source
September 2	12:00 p.m.	Delaware Valley*		Grady Field; Cortland, NY	W 42–13	4,233	
September 9	1:00 p.m.	at Lycoming*		Girardi Stadium; Williamsport, PA	W 62–7	1,278	
September 16	1:00 p.m.	Susquehanna*		Grady Field; Cortland, NY	L 35–38	3,538	
September 30	1:00 p.m.	at Morrisville	No. 20	Drake Field; Morrisville, NY	W 52–15	1,702	
October 7	1:00 p.m.	No. 22 Utica	No. 19	Grady Field; Cortland, NY	W 56–3	3,641	
October 14	1:00 p.m.	Alfred	No. 19	Grady Field; Cortland, NY	W 59–21	1,231	
October 21	12:00 p.m.	at St. John Fisher	No. 19	Growney Stadium; Pittsford, NY	W 42–14	3,321	
October 28	2:30 p.m.	at Hartwick	No. 18	Wright Stadium; Oneonta, NY	W 73–7	413	
November 4	12:00 p.m.	Brockport	No. 17	Grady Field; Cortland, NY	W 41–17	3,321	
November 11	12:00 p.m.	at No. 14 Ithaca*	No. 16	Butterfield Stadium; Ithaca, NY (Cortaca Jug)	W 38–28	7,800	
November 18	12:00 p.m.	at No. 14 Endicott*	No. 11	Hempstead Stadium; Beverly, MA (NCAA Division III first round)	W 23–17	956	
November 25	12:00 p.m.	No. 16 Grove City*	No. 13	Grady Field; Cortland, NY (NCAA Division III second round)	W 25–24	932	
December 2	12:00 p.m.	at No. 11 Alma*	No. 13	Bahlke Field; Alma, MI (NCAA Division III quarterfinal)	W 58–41	2,542	
December 9	12:00 p.m.	at No. 8 Randolph–Macon*	No. 13	Day Field; Ashland, VA (NCAA Division III semifinal)	W 49–14	4,223	
December 15	7:03 p.m.	vs. No. 1 North Central (IL)*	No. 13	Salem Football Stadium; Salem, VA (Stagg Bowl)	W 38–37	3,381	
*Non-conference game; Rankings from AFCA Poll released prior to the game; All times are in Central time

== Roster ==
2023 Cortland Red Dragons football team roster
Players
Coaches
Offense

Pos.	#	Name	Class
RB	2	Jaden AlfanoStJohn	Jr
WR	4	JJ Laap	Sr
WR	5	Rashad Tucker	Sr
WR	6	Joe Iadevaio	So
RB	8	Ashton Capone	Sr
WR	9	Cam Crosier	Sr
WR	10	Andrew Tarpey	Jr
TE	11	Michael Mulhern	Jr
QB	12	Zac Boyes	Jr
WR	15	Cole Burgess	Sr
QB	16	Vin Mazzone	Jr
QB	17	Troy Churney	So
RB	28	Tyson Taylor	Fr
RB	31	Kyle Stracher	Sr
RB	37	Max Barone	So
RB	39	Ethan Gallo	Fr
TE	42	Garret Decker	Jr
OL	55	Ryan Bitka	Jr
OL	60	Nicholas El Chami	Fr
OL	61	Nate Parsons	Fr
OL	62	Sahej Walia	So
OL	64	Wallace Wilson III	Fr
OL	65	Jon Kabes	Sr
OL	66	Jack McGrath	Sr
OL	67	Will Laun	Jr
OL	68	Jack Bonawandt	So
OL	70	Johnnie Booker III	So
OL	71	Dougie Travis	Fr
OL	72	Hunter Hathaway	So
OL	73	Jayden Lont	So
OL	74	Aidan Glynn	So
OL	75	Kevin Whalen	So
OL	76	Nate Graser	So
OL	77	Jake Hromada	So
OL	78	Cody Aikey	Jr
WR	80	Connor Mooney	Jr
WR	81	Jayson Zeva	Fr
WR	82	Ravi Dass Jr.	Fr
WR	83	Joey Penizotto Jr.	So
TE	84	Omari Kendrick	Jr
WR	85	Andrew Fiore	Fr
WR	86	Joey Muscarella	Jr
WR	87	Nick Jordan	Fr
TE	88	Connor Mahunik	Jr
TE	89	Jeff Halusic	Sr
OL		Nick Aldino	Fr
OL		Dion Brucaj	Fr
QB		Craig Galea	Fr
QB		Aaron Jentz	Fr
TE		Dylan Kiely	So
WR		Matt Klamm	So
WR		Joey Leuzzi	Fr
WR		CJ Messina	Jr
QB		Steve Otremba	Fr
RB		Tomaso Ramos	Fr
TE		Logan Wendt	So
QB		Joe Young	So
WR		Austin Zaccagnino	Fr

Defense

Pos.	#	Name	Class
DB	0	Alex Nunez	Sr
DB	1	Eli Alvarez	Fr
DB	3	Alessandro DeRosa	So
DB	7	Mark Noel	Sr
DB	13	Luke Winslow	Sr
LB	18	Matt Lotter	So
DB	19	JT Thuesen	Jr
DB	20	Kaleb Paul	Fr
LB	21	Jaden Martinez	Jr
DB	22	Shane Patterson	So
LB	23	JC Mertz	Sr
DB	24	Allen Flore Jr.	So
DB	26	Ryan Isom	So
DB	29	Logan Hurd	So
DB	30	Nazair Jean-Lubin	Fr
LB	32	Ryan Costello	So
LB	33	Jack Winey	Jr
DB	34	Matt Fuggini	Sr
DB	35	Marco McKnight	So
LB	36	Brett Harvey	Jr
DL	38	Steve Riedel	Sr
DB	40	Ellis Einbinder	So
LB	41	Aidan Lochner	Fr
LB	43	David Romer	So
LB	44	Tziah Owens	Sr
LB	45	Craig Ackerman	Jr
DB	46	Sam Cotton	Fr
DB	48	Anthony Luciano	Fr
LB	50	Joe Ruggieri	Jr
DL	51	Max Llewellyn	Jr
LB	52	Kymanni Dennis	Jr
DL	53	Gavin Guers	So
LB	54	Dan Becker	Jr
LB	56	Zack Thuesen	Sr
LB	57	Jake Ward	So
LB	59	Aaron Henry	Fr
DL	63	George Gjelaj	Fr
DL	79	Will McCarthy	Jr
DL	90	Aden Wiser	So
DL	91	Will Ligarzewski	So
DL	92	Sam Maddi	Sr
DL	93	Parker Kristoff	So
DL	94	Junius Keys	Jr
DL	95	Nick Lardaro	Jr
DL	96	Steve Baker	Sr
DL	97	Will Ruckert	Sr
DL	98	Matt Ferrer	Jr
DL	99	Christian Powell	Sr
LB		Jeff Cubino	Jr
DB		Jackson Cypher	Fr
DL		Jacob Dobricki	Fr
DB		Gino Fulco	Fr
DB		Ty Kolar	Jr
LB		Patrick Moloney	Fr
DL		Aaron Nieves	Fr
LB		Sean O'Brien	Fr
LB		CJ Ozolins	So

Special teams

Pos.	#	Name	Class
K	14	Mike Baloga	Jr
K	25	Patrick Luby	Sr
LS	27	Dennis DeBellis	Jr
LS	47	Brandon Beh	So
K	58	Bryce Carroll	Jr
K	69	Alex Roca	Jr

Head coach

- Curt Fitzpatrick

Coordinators/assistant coaches

- Patrick Rotchford – Asst. Coach (Offensive Coordinator/Offensive Line/Recruiting Coordinator)
- Steve Cushing – Asst. Coach (Defensive Coordinator/Linebackers)
- Nolan Foley – Asst. Coach (Special Teams/Safeties)
- Paul Shaffner – Asst. Coach (Defensive Line)
- Kyle Gallagher – Asst. Coach (Wide Receivers)
- Taj-Amir Torres – Asst. Coach (Cornerbacks)
- Joe Mack – Asst. Coach (Running Backs)
- Bill Spicer – Asst. Coach (Tight Ends/Asst. Offensive Line)
- Mike Conners – Asst. Coach (Asst. Defensive Line)
- Phill Wiltshire – Strength and Conditioning Coordinator

Legend

- (C) Team captain
- (S) Suspended
- (I) Ineligible
- Injured
- Redshirt

Roster
