= 2023 Randolph–Macon Yellow Jackets football team =

American college football season

2023 Randolph–Macon Yellow Jackets football

ODAC champion

Division III seminfinal, L 14–49 vs. Cortland
- Conference: Old Dominion Athletic Conference

Ranking
- AFCA: No. 6
- D3Football.com: No. 7
- Record: 13–1 (7–0 ODAC)
- Head coach: Pedro Arruza (20th season)
- Offensive coordinator: Nick McGee (1st season)
- Defensive coordinator: Clay Emmrich (1st season)
- Co-defensive coordinator: Matt Szymanski (1st season)
- Home stadium: Day Field

2023 Old Dominion Athletic Conference football standings
	Conf.			Overall
Team	W		L	W		L
No. 7 Randolph–Macon $^	7	–	0	13	–	1
Washington & Lee	6	–	1	8	–	3
Bridgewater	5	–	2	7	–	4
Hampden–Sydney	4	–	3	6	–	4
Shenandoah	3	–	4	5	–	5
Averett	2	–	5	5	–	5
Ferrum	1	–	6	3	–	7
Guilford	0	–	7	2	–	8
$ – Conference champion; ^ – NCAA Division III playoff participant; Rankings from D3Football.com

The 2023 Randolph–Macon Yellow Jackets football team is an American football team that represents Randolph–Macon College as a member of the Old Dominion Athletic Conference (ODAC) during the 2023 NCAA Division III football season. In their 20th year under head coach Pedro Arruza, the Yellow Jackets have compiled a 13–1 record (7–0 in conference games), outscored opponents by a total of 636 to 213, and won the ODAC championship. The Yellow Jackets advanced to the NCAA Division III playoff where they defeated Christopher Newport in the first round, Ithaca in the second round, and Johns Hopkins in the quarterfinals. They lost to Cortland in the semifinals.

The team's individual statistical leaders included Drew Campanale with 2,597 passing yards and 24 touchdowns, Nick Hale with 1,049 rushing yards and 138 points scored, and David Wallis with 957 receiving yards.

The Yellow Jackets played their home games on Day Field in Ashland, Virginia.

== Schedule ==
Date	Time	Opponent	Rank	Site	Result	Attendance	Source
September 2	12:00 pm	at North Carolina Wesleyan*	No. 15	Vernon T. Bradley Stadium; Rocky Mount, NC	W 51–9	641	
September 9	1:00 pm	Catholic University*	No. 15	Day Field; Ashland, VA	W 59–14	1,875	
September 16	1:00 pm	at Southern Virginia*	No. 12	Knight Stadium; Buena Vista, VA	W 51–10	598	
September 30	1:00 pm	at Guilford	No. 11	Armfield Athletic Center; Greensboro, NC	W 70–14	2,765	
October 7	1:00 pm	Averett	No. 10	Day Field; Ashland, VA	W 59–7	2,445	
October 14	2:00 pm	at Bridgewater	No. 10	Jopson Athletic Complex; Bridgewater, VA	W 38–3	2,371	
October 21	1:00 pm	Shenandoah^{†}	No. 10	Day Field; Ashland, VA	W 48–13	2,771	
October 28	1:00 pm	Washington & Lee	No. 9	Day Field; Ashland, VA	W 35–12	2,292	
November 4	2:00 pm	at Ferrum	No. 9	W.B. Adams Stadium; Ferrum, VA	W 49–16	1,178	
November 11	1:00 pm	Hampden–Sydney	No. 9	Day Field; Ashland, VA (rivalry)	W 49–10	7,783	
November 18	12:00 pm	Christopher Newport*	No. 8	Day Field; Ashland, VA (NCAA Division III first round)	W 28–20	2,527	
November 25	12:00 pm	No. 19 Ithaca*	No. 8	Day Field; Ashland, VA (NCAA Division III second round)	W 46–0	1,606	
December 2	12:00 pm	at No. 7 Johns Hopkins*	No. 8	Homewood Field; Baltimore, MD (NCAA Division III quarterfinal)	W 39–36	1,719	
December 9	12:00 pm	No. 11 Cortland*	No. 8	Day Field; Ashland, VA (NCAA Division III semifinal)	L 14–49	4,223	
*Non-conference game; ^{†}Homecoming; Rankings from AFCA Poll released prior to the game; All times are in Central time
