= 2021 NCAA Division III football rankings =

Rankings for the 2021 NCAA Division III football season

- Season: 2021
- Postseason: Single-elimination
- Preseason No. 1: Mary Hardin–Baylor
- National champions: Mary Hardin–Baylor
- Conference with most teams in final poll: WIAC (3)

Two human polls and a committee's selections comprise the 2021 National Collegiate Athletic Association (NCAA) Division III football rankings. Unlike in Division I's Football Bowl Subdivision (FBS), the NCAA, Division III college football's governing body, bestows a national championship on the winner of the Stagg Bowl – the championship round of a 32-team postseason tournament. The main weekly poll that begins in the preseason is the D3football.com poll, which ranks the top 25 colleges in Division III football. The AFCA Division III Coaches Poll is released beginning midway through the season.

== Legend ==
| | Increase in ranking |
| | Decrease in ranking |
| | Not ranked previous week |
| | Selected for Division III Football Championship Playoffs |
| (#–#) | Win–loss record |
| (Italics) | Number of first place votes |
| т | Tied with team above or below also with this symbol |

== D3football.com poll ==
| | Preseason August 18 | Week 1 September 6 | Week 2 September 12 | Week 3 September 19 | Week 4 September 26 | Week 5 October 3 | Week 6 October 10 | Week 7 October 17 | Week 8 October 24 | Week 9 October 31 | Week 10 November 7 | Week 11 November 14 | Final December 18 | |
|---|---|---|---|---|---|---|---|---|---|---|---|---|---|---|
| 1. | Mary Hardin–Baylor (10) | Mary Hardin–Baylor (1–0) (12) | Mary Hardin–Baylor (2–0) (13) | North Central (IL) (2–0) (12) | North Central (IL) (3–0) (16) | North Central (IL) (4–0) (17) | North Central (IL) (5–0) (17) | North Central (IL) (6–0) (17) | North Central (IL) (7–0) (17) | North Central (IL) (8–0) (18) | North Central (IL) (9–0) (18) | North Central (IL) (10–0) (18) | Mary Hardin–Baylor (15–0) (25) | 1. |
| 2. | Mount Union (6) | Mount Union (1–0) (4) | Wisconsin–Whitewater (2–0) | Mary Hardin–Baylor (3–0) (10) | Mary Hardin–Baylor (4–0) (8) | Mary Hardin–Baylor (5–0) (7) | Mary Hardin–Baylor (5–0) (7) | Mary Hardin–Baylor (6–0) (7) | Mary Hardin–Baylor (7–0) (7) | Mary Hardin–Baylor (8–0) (7) | Mary Hardin–Baylor (9–0) (7) | Mary Hardin–Baylor (10–0) (7) | North Central (IL) (13–1) | 2. |
| 3. | North Central (IL) (4) | Wisconsin–Whitewater (1–0) (1) | Mount Union (1–0) (4) | Wisconsin–Whitewater (3–0) (1) | Wisconsin–Whitewater (3–0) | Wisconsin–Whitewater (4–0) | Wisconsin–Whitewater (5–0) | Wisconsin–Whitewater (6–0) | Wisconsin–Whitewater (7–0) | Wisconsin–Whitewater (8–0) | Wisconsin–Whitewater (9–0) | Wisconsin–Whitewater (10–0) | Wisconsin–Whitewater (13–1) | 3. |
| 4. | Wisconsin–Whitewater (1) | North Central (IL) (0–0) (4) | North Central (IL) (1–0) (4) | Mount Union (2–0) (2) | Mount Union (3–0) (1) | Mount Union (4–0) (1) | Mount Union (5–0) (1) | Mount Union (6–0) (1) | Mount Union (7–0) (1) | Mount Union (8–0) | Mount Union (9–0) | Mount Union (10–0) | Mount Union (13–1) | 4. |
| 5. | Wheaton (IL) (4) | Wheaton (IL) (1–0) (4) | Wheaton (IL) (1–0) (4) | Wheaton (IL) (1–1) | Wheaton (IL) (2–1) | Wheaton (IL) (3–1) | Saint John's (MN) (5–0) | Saint John's (MN) (6–0) | Saint John's (MN) (7–0) | Saint John's (MN) (8–0) | Saint John's (MN) (9–0) | Saint John's (MN) (10–0) | Linfield (11–1) | 5. |
| 6. | Saint John's (MN) | Saint John's (MN) (1–0) | Hardin–Simmons (2–0) | Saint John's (MN) (2–0) | Saint John's (MN) (3–0) | Saint John's (MN) (4–0) | Wheaton (IL) (4–1) | Wheaton (IL) (5–1) | Wheaton (IL) (6–1) | Wheaton (IL) (7–1) | Wheaton (IL) (8–1) | Wheaton (IL) (9–1) | Central (IA) (12–1) | 6. |
| 7. | Hardin–Simmons | Hardin–Simmons (1–0) | Saint John's (MN) (1–0) | Hardin–Simmons (3–0) | Hardin–Simmons (3–1) | Linfield (3–0) | Linfield (4–0) | Linfield (5–0) | Linfield (6–0) | Linfield (7–0) | Linfield (8–0) | Linfield (9–0) | Muhlenberg (11–2) | 7. |
| 8. | Salisbury | Salisbury (1–0) | Muhlenberg (2–0) | Wisconsin–Oshkosh (2–0) | Wisconsin–Oshkosh (2–0) | Hardin–Simmons (4–1) | Hardin–Simmons (4–1) | Hardin–Simmons (5–1) | Hardin–Simmons (6–1) | Hardin–Simmons (7–1) | Hardin–Simmons (8–1) | Central (IA) (10–0) | Saint John's (MN) (11–1) | 8. |
| 9. | Wisconsin–Oshkosh | Muhlenberg (1–0) | Wisconsin–Oshkosh (2–0) | Linfield (2–0) | Linfield (2–0) | Wisconsin–Oshkosh (3–0) | Delaware Valley (5–0) | Delaware Valley (6–0) | Central (IA) (7–0) | Central (IA) (8–0) | Central (IA) (9–0) | Delaware Valley (10–0) | Wheaton (IL) (10–2) | 9. |
| 10. | Linfield | Delaware Valley (1–0) | Delaware Valley (2–0) | Delaware Valley (3–0) | Delaware Valley (3–0) | Delaware Valley (4–0) | Central (IA) (6–0) | Central (IA) (6–0) | Delaware Valley (7–0) | Delaware Valley (8–0) | Delaware Valley (9–0) | Hardin–Simmons (9–1) | Hardin–Simmons (9–1) | 10. |
| 11. | John Carroll | Wisconsin–Oshkosh (1–0) | Linfield (1–0) | Washington & Jefferson (3–0) | Washington & Jefferson (4–0) | Central (IA) (5–0) | Wisconsin–La Crosse (4–1) | Washington & Jefferson (6–0) | Salisbury (5–1) | Salisbury (6–1) | Salisbury (7–1) | Wisconsin–La Crosse (8–2) | Wisconsin–La Crosse (9–3) | 11. |
| 12. | Delaware Valley | Linfield (0–0) | Washington & Jefferson (2–0) | Union (NY) (3–0) | Union (NY) (4–0) | Washington & Jefferson (5–0) | Washington & Jefferson (6–0) | Salisbury (4–1) | Union (NY) (7–0) | Wisconsin–La Crosse (7–1) | Wisconsin–La Crosse (7–2) | Salisbury (8–1) | Trinity (TX) (9–1) | 12. |
| 13. | Muhlenberg | Washington & Jefferson (1–0) | Union (NY) (2–0) | Bethel (MN) (2–0) | Central (IA) (4–0) | Salisbury (3–1) | Salisbury (3–1) | Union (NY) (6–0) | Wisconsin–La Crosse (6–1) | Union (NY) (8–0) | Bethel (MN) (8–1) | Cortland (10–0) | RPI (11–2) | 13. |
| 14. | Central (IA) | Union (NY) (1–0) | Salisbury (1–1) | Central (IA) (3–0) | Salisbury (2–1) | Union (NY) (5–0) | Johns Hopkins (5–0) | Wisconsin–La Crosse (5–1) | Bethel (MN) (6–1) | Bethel (MN) (7–1) | Cortland (9–0) | Bethel (MN) (8–2) | Johns Hopkins (10–2) | 14. |
| 15. | Union (NY) | Wartburg (1–0) | Bethel (MN) (2–0) | Salisbury (1–1) | Johns Hopkins (4–0) | Johns Hopkins (5–0) | Union (NY) (6–0) | Bethel (MN) (5–1) | Ithaca (7–0) | Cortland (8–0) | Muhlenberg (8–1) | Muhlenberg (8–1) | Delaware Valley (11–1) | 15. |
| 16. | Bethel (MN) | Central (IA) (1–0) | Central (IA) (2–0) | Randolph–Macon (3–0) | Bethel (MN) (2–1) | Bethel (MN) (3–1) | Bethel (MN) (4–1) | Ithaca (6–0) | Cortland (7–0) | Muhlenberg (7–1) | Trinity (TX) (8–0) | Trinity (TX) (9–0) | Cortland (11–1) | 16. |
| 17. | Randolph–Macon | Bethel (MN) (1–0) | Chapman (2–0) | Chapman (3–0) | Ithaca (3–0) | Ithaca (4–0) | Ithaca (5–0) | Cortland (6–0) | Muhlenberg (6–1) | Johns Hopkins (7–1) | Johns Hopkins (8–1) | Johns Hopkins (9–1) | Bethel (MN) (8–3) | 17. |
| 18. | Wartburg | Chapman (1–0) | Randolph–Macon (2–0) | Johns Hopkins (3–0) | Whitworth (3–0) | Whitworth (4–0) | Wisconsin–Oshkosh (3–1) | Muhlenberg (5–1) | Susquehanna (7–0) | Trinity (TX) (7–0) | Ithaca (8–1) | RPI (9–1) | Birmingham–Southern (10–2) | 18. |
| 19. | Washington & Jefferson | Randolph–Macon (1–0) | Ithaca (2–0) | Ithaca (3–0) | Cortland (3–0) | Cortland (4–0) | Cortland (5–0) | Susquehanna (6–0) | Trinity (TX) (6–0) | Birmingham–Southern (8–0) | Wisconsin–Oshkosh (6–2) | Birmingham–Southern (9–1) | Salisbury (8–2) | 19. |
| 20. | Westminster (PA) | Brockport (1–0) | John Carroll (0–1) | Whitworth (3–0) | Wisconsin–La Crosse (2–1) | Wisconsin–La Crosse (3–1) | Susquehanna (5–0) | Johns Hopkins (5–1) | Johns Hopkins (6–1) | Wisconsin–Oshkosh (5–2) | Baldwin Wallace (8–1) | Ithaca (8–2) | Wisconsin–River Falls (9–2) | 20. |
| 21. | Chapman | Aurora (0–1) | Johns Hopkins (2–0) | John Carroll (1–1) | Hobart (4–0) | Muhlenberg (4–1) | Muhlenberg (4–1) | Trinity (TX) (5–0) | Wisconsin–Oshkosh (4–2) | Baldwin Wallace (7–1) | RPI (8–1) | Randolph–Macon (9–1) | Ithaca (8–2) | 21. |
| 22. | Brockport | John Carroll (0–1) | Heidelberg (1–0) | Heidelberg (2–0) | John Carroll (1–2) | John Carroll (2–2) | John Carroll (3–2) | Birmingham–Southern (6–0) | Birmingham–Southern (7–0) | Washington & Jefferson (7–1) | Birmingham–Southern (8–1) | Wisconsin–River Falls (8–2) | Aurora (8–3) | 22. |
| 23. | Aurora | Heidelberg (1–0) | Whitworth (2–0) | Wisconsin–La Crosse (2–1) | Muhlenberg (3–1) | Susquehanna (5–0) | Trinity (TX) (4–0) | Wisconsin–Oshkosh (3–2) | Baldwin Wallace (6–1) | RPI (7–1) | Union (NY) (8–1) | Aurora (8–2) | Randolph–Macon (9–1) | 23. |
| 24. | Heidelberg | Whitworth (1–0) | Wisconsin–La Crosse (2–0) | Muhlenberg (2–1) | Westminster (PA) (2–1) | Westminster (PA) (3–1) | Birmingham–Southern (5–0) | John Carroll (4–2) | Washington & Jefferson (6–1) | Ithaca (7–1) | Randolph–Macon (8–1) | Lake Forest (10–0) | Redlands (8–2) | 24. |
| 25. | Berry | Johns Hopkins (1–0) | Berry (2–0) | Cortland (3–0) | Susquehanna (4–0) | Hobart (4–1) | Baldwin Wallace (4–1) | Baldwin Wallace (5–1) | John Carroll (5–2) | Susquehanna (7–1) | DePauw (8–1) | Redlands (8–1) | Lake Forest (10–1) | 25. |
| | Preseason August 18 | Week 1 September 6 | Week 2 September 12 | Week 3 September 19 | Week 4 September 26 | Week 5 October 3 | Week 6 October 10 | Week 7 October 17 | Week 8 October 24 | Week 9 October 31 | Week 10 November 7 | Week 11 November 14 | Final December 18 | |
| | | Dropped: No. 20 Westminster (PA); No. 25 Berry | Dropped: No. 15 Wartburg; No. 20 Brockport; No. 21 Aurora | Dropped: No. 25 Berry | Dropped: No. 16 Randolph–Macon; No. 17 Chapman; No. 22 Heidelberg | None | Dropped: No. 18 Whitworth; No. 24 Westminster (PA); No. 25 Hobart | None | None | Dropped: No. 25 John Carroll | Dropped: No. 22 Washington & Jefferson; No. 25 Susquehanna | Dropped: No. 19 Wisconsin–Oshkosh; No. 20 Baldwin Wallace; No. 23 Union (NY); No. 25 DePauw | None | |

== AFCA Coaches Poll ==
| | Week 3 September 20 | Week 4 September 27 | Week 5 October 4 | Week 6 October 11 | Week 7 October 18 | Week 8 October 25 | Week 9 November 1 | Week 10 November 8 | Week 11 November 15 | Final December 20 | |
|---|---|---|---|---|---|---|---|---|---|---|---|
| 1. | Mary Hardin–Baylor (3–0) (26) | Mary Hardin–Baylor (4–0) (24) | North Central (IL) (4–0) (21) | North Central (IL) (5–0) (36) | North Central (IL) (6–0) (40) | North Central (IL) (7–0) (17) | North Central (IL) (8–0) (38) | North Central (IL) (9–0) (40) | North Central (IL) (10–0) (39) | Mary Hardin–Baylor (15–0) (47) | 1. |
| 2. | Wisconsin–Whitewater (3–0) (4) | North Central (IL) (3–0) (19) | Mary Hardin–Baylor (5–0) (23) | Mary Hardin–Baylor (5–0) (7) | Mary Hardin–Baylor (6–0) (5) | Mary Hardin–Baylor (7–0) (5) | Mary Hardin–Baylor (8–0) (7) | Mary Hardin–Baylor (9–0) (5) | Mary Hardin–Baylor (10–0) (6) | North Central (IL) (13–1) | 2. |
| 3. | Mount Union (2–0) (2) | Wisconsin–Whitewater (3–0) (3) | Wisconsin–Whitewater (4–0) (2) | Wisconsin–Whitewater (5–0) (3) | Wisconsin–Whitewater (6–0) (1) | Wisconsin–Whitewater (7–0) | Wisconsin–Whitewater (8–0) (1) | Wisconsin–Whitewater (9–0) (1) | Wisconsin–Whitewater (10–0) (1) | Wisconsin–Whitewater (13–1) | 3. |
| 4. | North Central (IL) (2–0) (15) | Mount Union (3–0) (1) | Mount Union (4–0) (1) | Mount Union (5–0) (1) | Mount Union (6–0) (1) | Mount Union (7–0) (1) | Mount Union (8–0) | Mount Union (9–0) | Mount Union (10–0) (1) | Mount Union (13–1) | 4. |
| 5. | Saint John's (MN) (2–0) | Saint John's (MN) (3–0) | Saint John's (MN) (4–0) | Saint John's (MN) (5–0) | Saint John's (MN) (6–0) | Saint John's (MN) (7–0) | Saint John's (MN) (8–0) (1) | Saint John's (MN) (9–0) (1) | Saint John's (MN) (10–0) | Linfield (11–1) | 5. |
| 6. | Hardin–Simmons (3–0) | Wisconsin–Oshkosh (2–0) | Wisconsin–Oshkosh (3–0) | Linfield (4–0) | Linfield (5–0) | Linfield (6–0) | Linfield (7–0) | Linfield (8–0) | Linfield (9–0) | Central (IA) (12–1) | 6. |
| 7. | Wisconsin–Oshkosh (2–0) | Delaware Valley (3–0) | Delaware Valley (4–0) т | Delaware Valley (5–0) | Delaware Valley (6–0) | Delaware Valley (7–0) | Delaware Valley (8–0) | Delaware Valley (9–0) | Delaware Valley (10–0) | Muhlenberg (11–2) | 7. |
| 8. | Delaware Valley (3–0) | Linfield (2–0) | Linfield (3–0) т | Hardin–Simmons (4–1) | Hardin–Simmons (5–1) | Hardin–Simmons (6–1) | Hardin–Simmons (7–1) | Hardin–Simmons (8–1) | Hardin–Simmons (9–1) | Saint John's (MN) (11–1) | 8. |
| 9. | Linfield (2–0) | Hardin–Simmons (3–1) | Hardin–Simmons (4–1) | Wheaton (IL) (4–1) | Wheaton (IL) (5–1) | Wheaton (IL) (6–1) | Wheaton (IL) (7–1) | Wheaton (IL) (8–1) | Wheaton (IL) (9–1) | Wheaton (IL) (10–2) | 9. |
| 10. | Wheaton (IL) (1–1) | Wheaton (IL) (2–1) | Wheaton (IL) (3–1) | Central (IA) (6–0) | Central (IA) (6–0) | Central (IA) (7–0) | Central (IA) (8–0) | Central (IA) (9–0) | Central (IA) (10–0) | Hardin–Simmons (9–1) | 10. |
| 11. | Union (NY) (3–0) | Union (NY) (4–0) | Central (IA) (5–0) | Johns Hopkins (5–0) | Union (NY) (6–0) | Union (NY) (7–0) | Union (NY) (8–0) | Salisbury (7–1) | Salisbury (8–1) | Delaware Valley (11–1) | 11. |
| 12. | Washington & Jefferson (3–0) | Central (IA) (4–0) | Union (NY) (5–0) | Union (NY) (6–0) | Washington & Jefferson (6–0) | Wisconsin–La Crosse (6–1) | Wisconsin–La Crosse (7–1) | Bethel (MN) (8–1) | Cortland (10–0) | Wisconsin–La Crosse (9–3) | 12. |
| 13. | Central (IA) (3–0) | Washington & Jefferson (4–0) | Johns Hopkins (5–0) | Washington & Jefferson (6–0) | Wisconsin–La Crosse (5–1) | Ithaca (7–0) | Salisbury (6–1) | Cortland (9–0) | Muhlenberg (9–1) | Johns Hopkins (10–2) | 13. |
| 14. | Johns Hopkins (3–0) | Johns Hopkins (4–0) | Washington & Jefferson (5–0) | Wisconsin–La Crosse (4–1) | Ithaca (6–0) | Salisbury (5–1) | Bethel (MN) (7–1) | Muhlenberg (8–1) | Trinity (TX) (9–0) | RPI (11–2) | 14. |
| 15. | Bethel (MN) (2–0) | Ithaca (3–0) | Ithaca (4–0) | Ithaca (5–0) | Salisbury (4–1) | Bethel (MN) (6–1) | Cortland (8–0) | Trinity (TX) (8–0) | Wisconsin–La Crosse (8–2) | Trinity (TX) (9–1) | 15. |
| 16. | Randolph–Macon (3–0) | Salisbury (2–1) | Salisbury (3–1) | Salisbury (3–1) | Bethel (MN) (5–1) | Cortland (7–0) | Muhlenberg (7–1) | Wisconsin–La Crosse (7–2) | Johns Hopkins (9–1) | Cortland (11–1) | 16. |
| 17. | Salisbury (1–1) | Bethel (MN) (2–1) | Bethel (MN) (3–1) | Bethel (MN) (4–1) | Cortland (6–0) | Muhlenberg (6–1) | Trinity (TX) (7–0) | Johns Hopkins (8–1) | Bethel (MN) (8–2) | Salisbury (8–2) | 17. |
| 18. | Chapman (3–0) | Wabash (3–0) | Cortland (4–0) | Cortland (5–0) | Muhlenberg (5–1) | Susquehanna (7–0) | Johns Hopkins (7–1) | Ithaca (8–1) | Randolph–Macon (9–1) | Bethel (MN) (8–3) | 18. |
| 19. | Ithaca (3–0) | Cortland (3–0) | Wabash (4–0) | Wisconsin–Oshkosh (3–1) | Susquehanna (6–0) | Trinity (TX) (6–0) | Birmingham–Southern (8–0) | Randolph–Macon (8–1) | Birmingham–Southern (9–1) | Birmingham–Southern (10–2) | 19. |
| 20. | Wabash (3–0) | Wisconsin–La Crosse (2–1) | Wisconsin–La Crosse (3–1) | Wabash (5–0) | Trinity (TX) (5–0) | Johns Hopkins (6–1) | Randolph–Macon (8–1) | Wisconsin–Oshkosh (6–2) | RPI (9–1) | Randolph–Macon (9–1) | 20. |
| 21. | John Carroll (1–1) | Muhlenberg (3–1) | Whitworth (4–0) | Susquehanna (5–0) | Johns Hopkins (5–1) | Birmingham–Southern (7–0) | John Carroll (6–2) т | Baldwin Wallace (8–1) | Redlands (8–1) | Redlands (8–2) | 21. |
| 22. | Wisconsin–La Crosse (2–1) | Whitworth (3–0) | Muhlenberg (4–1) | Muhlenberg (4–1) | John Carroll (4–2) | John Carroll (5–2) | Wisconsin–Oshkosh (5–2) т | Union (NY) (8–1) | Lake Forest (10–0) | Wisconsin–River Falls (9–2) | 22. |
| 23. | Cortland (3–0) | Hobart (4–0) | Susquehanna (5–0) | RPI (6–0) т | Birmingham-Southern (6–0) | Wisconsin–Oshkosh (4–2) | Ithaca (7–1) | Birmingham–Southern (8–1) | Albion (9–1) | Lake Forest (10–1) | 23. |
| 24. | Heidelberg (2–0) | Albion (4–0) | Albion (4–0) | Trinity (TX) (4–0) т | Wisconsin–Oshkosh (3–2) | Randolph–Macon (7–1) | Washington & Jefferson (7–1) | RPI (8–1) | Ithaca (8–2) | Ithaca (8–2) | 24. |
| 25. | Muhlenberg (2–1) | Susquehanna (4–0) | RPI (5–0) | John Carroll (3–2) | Randolph–Macon (6–1) | Washington & Jefferson (6–1) | Baldwin Wallace (7–1) | Redlands (7–1) | Wisconsin–River Falls (8–2) | Albion (9–2) | 25. |
| | Week 3 September 20 | Week 4 September 27 | Week 5 October 4 | Week 6 October 11 | Week 7 October 18 | Week 8 October 25 | Week 9 November 1 | Week 10 November 8 | Week 11 November 15 | Final December 20 | |
| | | Dropped: No. 16 Randolph–Macon; No. 18 Chapman; No. 21 John Carroll; No. 24 Heidelberg | Dropped: No. 23 Hobart | Dropped: No. 21 Whitworth; No. 24 Albion | Dropped: No. 20 Wabash; No. 23т RPI | None | Dropped: No. 18 Susquehanna | Dropped: No. 21т John Carroll; No. 24 Washington & Jefferson | Dropped: No. 20 Wisconsin–Oshkosh; No. 21 Baldwin Wallace; No. 22 Union (NY) | None | |
