= 2023 Wartburg Knights football team =

American college football season

2023 Wartburg Knights football

ARC champion

NCAA Division III Semifinal, L 27–34 vs North Central
- Conference: American Rivers Conference

Ranking
- AFCA: No. 3
- D3Football.com: No. 3
- Record: 13–1 (8–0 ARC)
- Head coach: Chris Winter (3rd season)
- Offensive coordinator: Matt Wheeler (13th season)
- Defensive coordinator: Matt Tschetter (3rd season)
- Home stadium: Walston-Hoover Stadium

2023 American Rivers Conference football standings
| | Conf. | | | Overall |
| Team | W | | L | W | | L |
|---|---|---|---|---|---|---|
| No. 3 Wartburg $^ | 8 | – | 0 | 13 | – | 1 |
| Coe ^ | 7 | – | 1 | 9 | – | 2 |
| Central (IA) | 6 | – | 2 | 8 | – | 2 |
| Dubuque | 5 | – | 3 | 5 | – | 5 |
| Loras | 4 | – | 4 | 5 | – | 5 |
| Nebraska Wesleyan | 2 | – | 6 | 4 | – | 6 |
| Simpson (IA) | 2 | – | 6 | 3 | – | 7 |
| Buena Vista | 2 | – | 6 | 2 | – | 8 |
| Luther | 0 | – | 8 | 0 | – | 10 |
$ – Conference champion; ^ – NCAA Division III playoff participant; Rankings from D3Football.com

The 2023 Wartburg Knights football team represented Wartburg College as a member of the American Rivers Conference (ARC) during the 2023 NCAA Division III football season. The Knights, led by third-year head coach Chris Winter, played home games at Walston-Hoover Stadium in Waverly, Iowa. The Knights clinched their 19th conference championship on October 28, 2023, with a win over Central College and then capped of the regular season 10–0 following a win at Nebraska Wesleyan. Wartburg ended the season in the national semifinals for the second straight year, losing to North Central 34–27.

Senior linebacker Owen Grover was named the Cliff Harris Award winner, awarded to the defensive player of the year in division III. He was also named ARC Defensive player of the year and 1st team all-American along with 3 other teammates, including running back Hunter Clasen, who was also named ARC Offensive player of the year.

== Schedule ==
Wartburg's 2023 regular season scheduled consisted of five home and five away games. The Knights also hosted 4 postseason games.

| Date | Time | Opponent | Rank | Site | Result | Attendance |
|---|---|---|---|---|---|---|
| September 2 | 7:00 p.m. | Monmouth (IL)* | No. 5 | Walston-Hoover Stadium; Waverly, IA | W 62–35 | 3,756 |
| September 9 | 1:00 p.m. | at No. 16 Bethel (MN)* | No. 3 | Royal Stadium; Arden Hills, MN | W 16–2 | 3,642 |
| September 16 | 1:00 p.m. | Buena Vista | No. 3 | Walston-Hoover Stadium; Waverly, IA | W 47–0 | 2,137 |
| September 23 | 1:00 p.m. | at Simpson | No. 3 | Buxton Stadium; Indianola, IA | W 63–0 | 1,524 |
| September 30 | 1:00 p.m. | Coe | No. 3 | Walston-Hoover Stadium; Waverly, IA | W 27–21 | 3,016 |
| October 7 | 1:00 p.m. | at Luther | No. 4 | Carlson Stadium; Decorah, IA | W 54–0 | 317 |
| October 14 | 1:30 p.m. | Dubuque^{†} | No. 3 | Walston-Hoover Stadium; Waverly, IA | W 31–10 | 5,102 |
| October 21 | 1:00 p.m. | at Loras | No. 3 | Rock Bowl; Dubuque, IA | W 62–7 | 1,300 |
| October 28 | 1:00 p.m. | Central (IA) | No. 3 | Walston-Hoover Stadium; Waverly, IA | W 24–14 | 1,500 |
| November 4 | 1:00 p.m. | at Nebraska Wesleyan | No. 3 | Abel Stadium; Lincoln, NE | W 45–0 | 1,200 |
| November 18 | 12:00 p.m. | Illinois College* | No. 3 | Walston-Hoover Stadium; Waverly, IA (NCAA Division III First Round) | W 49–14 | 1,355 |
| November 25 | 12:00 p.m. | No. 20 Whitworth* | No. 3 | Walston-Hoover Stadium; Waverly, IA (NCAA Division III Second Round) | W 42–20 | 1,207 |
| December 2 | 12:00 p.m. | No. 5 Wisconsin–Whitewater* | No. 3 | Walston-Hoover Stadium; Waverly, IA (NCAA Division III Quarterfinals) | W 31–28 | 3,259 |
| December 9 | 2:30 p.m. | No. 1 North Central (IL)* | No. 3 | Walston-Hoover Stadium; Waverly, IA (NCAA Division III Semifinals) | L 27–34 | 3,525 |
*Non-conference game; ^{†}Homecoming; Rankings from D3Football.com Poll released prior to the game; All times are in Central time

== Rankings ==
Ranking movements Legend: ██ Increase in ranking ██ Decrease in ranking
| | Week | | | | | | | | | | | | |
| Poll | Pre | 1 | 2 | 3 | 4 | 5 | 6 | 7 | 8 | 9 | 10 | 11 | Final |
|---|---|---|---|---|---|---|---|---|---|---|---|---|---|
| D3football.com | 5 | 3 | 3 | 3 | 3 | 4 | 3 | 3 | 3 | 3 | 3 | 3 | 3 |
| AFCA | Not released | | | 4 | 4 | 4 | 3 | 3 | 3 | 3 | 3 | 3 | 3 |

== Roster ==
2023 Wartburg Knights football team roster
Players
Coaches
Offense

| Pos. | # | Name | Class |
|---|---|---|---|
| WR | 1 | Brock Califf | Jr |
| QB | 3 | Riley Richards | Jr |
| WR | 4 | Drake George | Sr |
| QB | 5 | Grant Halverson | So |
| WR | 6 | Trey Eagle | Sr |
| WR | 6 | Caleb Egesdal | Fr |
| QB | 7 | Carter Markham | Jr |
| WR | 8 | Karter Decker | Fr |
| QB | 8 | Nile McLaughlin | Sr |
| WR | 10 | Carter Henry | Jr |
| QB | 10 | Payton Salomon | Fr |
| WR | 11 | Thor Maakestad | Sr |
| QB | 15 | Quintin Loeb | Fr |
| WR | 15 | Miles Robertson | Fr |
| WR | 16 | Jagger Schmitt | So |
| WR | 17 | Matt Buckner | Sr |
| QB | 18 | Leo Dodd | So |
| WR | 20 | Dylan Swanstrom | Fr |
| RB | 21 | Ben Bryant | Sr |
| WR | 23 | Darius Whaley | Sr |
| RB | 24 | Hunter Clasen | Sr |
| RB | 25 | Dylan Marti | Fr |
| WR | 26 | Jonathan Greig | Fr |
| RB | 27 | Brenden Fisch | Fr |
| RB | 28 | Bricen White | Jr |
| RB | 31 | Joey Anderson | So |
| RB | 31 | Brandon Cushion | Fr |
| RB | 35 | Levi Pingel | So |
| RB | 36 | Dawson Rud | Fr |
| RB | 38 | CJ Hisler | Fr |
| RB | 39 | Maurice Powell | Fr |
| TE | 41 | John McConohy | Jr |
| TE | 43 | Micah Holmberg | So |
| TE | 46 | Austin Barta | Jr |
| RB | 47 | Jackson Thompson | Fr |
| OL | 51 | Will Conlan | Sr |
| OL | 52 | Ben Petlon | Sr |
| OL | 53 | Brandt Petersen | Sr |
| OL | 60 | Ben Dunlap | Sr |
| OL | 60 | Brady Weepie | Fr |
| OL | 62 | Arturo Venegas | Fr |
| OL | 63 | Reese Theobald | So |
| OL | 64 | Jason Koopmann | So |
| OL | 65 | Brandt Reints | Fr |
| OL | 65 | Cooper Smock | Jr |
| OL | 65 | Garrett Williams | Fr |
| OL | 66 | Cade Carpenter | Jr |
| OL | 67 | Josh Reichard | Fr |
| OL | 68 | Kellen Kpogli | Fr |
| OL | 68 | Ethan Stockwell | Sr |
| OL | 69 | Nathan Lorenzen | So |
| OL | 70 | Logan Peterman | Fr |
| OL | 72 | Jesse Nevarez | Fr |
| OL | 72 | Max Rossow | Fr |
| OL | 73 | Xander Bradley | Jr |
| OL | 74 | Alex Lahmon | Sr |
| OL | 75 | Brady Robinson | Fr |
| OL | 76 | Clayton Bockhoven | Fr |
| OL | 76 | Isaiah Corbin | Jr |
| OL | 77 | Dakota Dally | Fr |
| OL | 77 | Tucker Kinney | Sr |
| OL | 78 | Cole Mahnke | Fr |
| WR | 80 | Tai Streets | So |
| WR | 80 | Ben Wymer | Fr |
| TE | 81 | Kaden Behrens | So |
| TE | 81 | Tom Butters | Sr |
| WR | 82 | Justis Bachman | Fr |
| TE | 82 | Grant Higgins | Jr |
| WR | 83 | Caleb Beck | Fr |
| WR | 83 | Jack Eddy | Fr |
| WR | 83 | Max Solis | Jr |
| WR | 84 | Tucker Mumford | Sr |
| TE | 85 | Matt Dufoe | So |
| WR | 85 | Brayden Lane | Fr |
| WR | 85 | Elijah Mendoza | Fr |
| TE | 86 | Tanner Sauerbrei | Jr |
| WR | 87 | Cade Hughes | So |
| WR | 88 | Carter Bussanmas | Sr |
| WR | 89 | Tyler Ott | Jr |
| TE | 93 | Blayne Farmer | Fr |
| TE | 96 | Matthew Hilleman | Fr |
| TE | 96 | Malachi Moore | Fr |

Defense

| Pos. | # | Name | Class |
|---|---|---|---|
| DB | 2 | Grant McCallips | Sr |
| DB | 2 | Jack Wilson | Fr |
| LB | 3 | Nate Link | Sr |
| DB | 5 | Kaleb Lamphier | Sr |
| DB | 6 | Sam Kissner | Sr |
| DB | 8 | Ryan Doyle | Fr |
| DB | 9 | Ben Parker | Sr |
| DB | 10 | Trace Meyer | Fr |
| DB | 12 | Blake Janssen | So |
| DB | 13 | Thane Alexander | Jr |
| DB | 14 | Parker Rochford | Jr |
| DB | 15 | Grant Larson | Jr |
| DB | 19 | Drew Wyffels | Sr |
| DB | 20 | Conner Grover | So |
| LB | 22 | Sam Conway | So |
| DB | 22 | Dylan Steen | Sr |
| DB | 23 | Ryan Folkerts | So |
| DB | 25 | Calem Maclearn | Jr |
| DB | 26 | Jason O'Boye | Fr |
| DB | 27 | Logan Jungling | Fr |
| DB | 27 | Tegan Wyckoff | Sr |
| DB | 28 | Dylan McCaulley | Fr |
| DB | 28 | Tobias Polk | Jr |
| LB | 29 | Tyler Gayer | Fr |
| DB | 30 | DJ Witt | Jr |
| DB | 32 | Adam Link | Fr |
| DB | 33 | Dakota Lau | Jr |
| DL | 34 | Jordan Downing | Sr |
| LB | 36 | McKade Munn | So |
| LB | 37 | Preston Rochford | Sr |
| LB | 40 | Mac Watts | So |
| DL | 42 | Justin Grieff | Sr |
| LB | 44 | Owen Grover | Sr |
| DB | 45 | Colt Berry | Fr |
| LB | 45 | Dakota Stevenson | Sr |
| LB | 48 | Alex Koch | So |
| LB | 49 | Keenan Tyler | So |
| LB | 50 | Jack Heinberg | So |
| LB | 51 | Aiden Mauer | Fr |
| LB | 52 | Colin Snitker | So |
| DL | 54 | Conner McDonald | Fr |
| DL | 55 | Riley Konrardy | Sr |
| LB | 55 | Kale Rodgers | Jr |
| LB | 56 | Kaden Bibler | So |
| DL | 56 | Kanan Morris | Sr |
| LB | 57 | Seth Madden | Fr |
| LB | 58 | Trent Polley | So |
| LB | 58 | Trent Roberts | So |
| LB | 59 | Zack Crawford | Fr |
| DL | 61 | Riley Theobald | Sr |
| DL | 71 | Kale Folkerts | Jr |
| DL | 72 | Ethan Schellhorn | Jr |
| DL | 73 | Ethan Berding | Fr |
| DL | 74 | Jackson Woodley | Fr |
| DL | 75 | Andrew Friend | Jr |
| DL | 79 | Aiden Roberson | Fr |
| DL | 90 | Jack Drahos | So |
| DL | 91 | Walker Hermeier | Jr |
| DL | 93 | Aiden Doyle | Fr |
| DL | 93 | Griffin Neal | Jr |
| DL | 94 | Josh Stiffend | Sr |
| DL | 95 | Brady Peterson | Fr |
| DL | 96 | Cam Stalzer | So |
| DL | 97 | Owen Hatcher | Jr |
| DL | 98 | Jake Walker | Fr |
| DL | 99 | Christian Nunley | Jr |

Special teams

| Pos. | # | Name | Class |
|---|---|---|---|
| K | 0 | Cael O'Neill | Sr |
| K/P | 39 | Luke Shepard | Fr |
| K/P | 39 | Jaxson Hoppes | So |
| LS | 79 | Parker Sperfslage | Fr |

Head coach

- Chris Winter

Coordinators/assistant coaches

- Matt Wheeler – Offensive Coordinator/Assistant Head Coach
- Matt Tschetter – Defensive Coordinator/Recruiting Coordinator
- Anthony Vela – Defensive Line
- Luke Summers – Offensive Line
- Ethan Lape – Running Backs
- Quinton Murphy – Wide Receivers
- Jeff Beck – Offensive Assistant
- Paul Mugan – Tight Ends
- Steve Kingery – Specialists
- Jason Splitt – Defensive Assistant/Student Coach
- Danny Drees – Athletic Trainer
- Jessica Albright – Athletic Trainer

Legend

- (C) Team captain
- (S) Suspended
- (I) Ineligible
- Injured
- Redshirt

Roster
Last update: June 4, 2025

== Awards and honors ==
Individual awards
| Player | Award |
|---|---|
| Owen Grover | William V. Campbell Trophy Finalist; Gagliardi Trophy Finalist; ARC Defensive Player of the Year; Cliff Harris Award; D3Football.com Defensive Player of the year DIII Academic All-American of the Year; D3football.com 1st team All-American; AFCA 1st team All-American; AP 1st team All-American |
| Hunter Clasen | ARC Offensive Player of the Year; D3football.com 1st team All-American; AP 2nd team All-American |
| Parker Rochford | D3football.com 1st team All-American; AP 1st team All-American |
| Riley Konrardy | D3football.com 1st team All-American |
| Jordan Downing | D3football.com 3rd team All-American; AP 2nd team All-American |
| Tucker Kinney | D3football.com 4th team All-American |
| Coach | Award |
| Chris Winter | ARC Coach of the year AFCA Region 5 Coach of the year |

All-Conference
| Player | Position | Team | Year |
|---|---|---|---|
| Jordan Downing | DL | 1 | SR |
| Riley Konrardy | DL | 1 | SR |
| Owen Grover | LB | 1 | SR |
| Nate Link | LB | 1 | SR |
| Parker Rochford | DB | 1 | JR |
| Hunter Clasen | RB | 1 | SR |
| Tucker Kinney | OT | 1 | SR |
| Alex Lahmon | OG | 1 | SR |
| Justin Grieff | DL | 2 | SR |
| Preston Rochford | LB | 2 | SR |
| Drew Wyffels | DB | 2 | SR |
| Nile McLaughlin | QB | 2 | SR |
| Tom Butters | TE | 2 | SR |
| Ethan Stockwell | OT | 2 | SR |
| Cael O'Neill | K | 2 | SR |
| Jaxson Hoppes | P | HM | SO |
| Dylan Steen | DB | HM | SR |
HM = Honorable mention. Reference:
