= 2021 Wartburg Knights football team =

American college football season

2021 Wartburg Knights football
- Conference: American Rivers Conference
- Record: 7–3 (6–2 ARC)
- Head coach: Chris Winter (1st season)
- Offensive coordinator: Matt Wheeler (11th season)
- Defensive coordinator: Matt Tschetter (1st season)
- Home stadium: Walston-Hoover Stadium

2021 American Rivers Conference football standings
	Conf.			Overall
Team	W		L	W		L
No. 6 Central (IA) $^	8	–	0	12	–	1
Coe	6	–	2	8	–	2
Wartburg	6	–	2	7	–	3
Dubuque	5	–	3	6	–	4
Buena Vista	4	–	4	5	–	5
Loras	4	–	4	4	–	6
Nebraska Wesleyan	2	–	6	4	–	6
Simpson (IA)	1	–	7	1	–	9
Luther	0	–	8	0	–	10
$ – Conference champion; ^ – NCAA Division III playoff participant; Rankings from AFCA Poll

The 2021 Wartburg Knights football team represented Wartburg College as a member of the American Rivers Conference (ARC) during the 2021 NCAA Division III football season. Led by first-year head coach Chris Winter, the Knights opened the season and Winters tenure with a win. They opened conference play with a win over Coe but finished the season with an overall record of 7–3 and a mark of 6–2 in the ARC, placing second. The team played home games at Walston-Hoover Stadium in Waverly, Iowa.

== Schedule ==
Date	Time	Opponent	Rank	Site	Result	Attendance
September 4	7:00 p.m.	Monmouth (IL)*	No. 18	Walston-Hoover Stadium; Waverly, IA	W 44–3	1,500
September 11	1:00 p.m.	at Gustavus Adolphus*	No. 15	Hollingsworth Field; Saint Peter, MN	L 18–27	1,743
September 25	1:00 p.m.	Coe		Walston-Hoover Stadium; Waverly, IA	W 24–49	2,500
October 2	1:00 p.m.	at No. 13 Central (IA)		Ron and Joyce Schipper Stadium; Pella, IA	L 24–49	2,000
October 9	1:30 p.m.	Loras^{†}		Walston-Hoover Stadium; Waverly, IA	W 58–21	3,200
October 16	1:00 p.m.	at Luther		Carlson Stadium; Decorah, IA	W 67–0	405
October 23	1:00 p.m.	Dubuque		Walston-Hoover Stadium; Waverly, IA	W 27–7	2,100
October 30	1:00 p.m.	at Buena Vista		J. Leslie Rollins Stadium and Peterson Field; Storm Lake, IA	L 20–24	615
November 6	1:00 p.m.	Nebraska Wesleyan		Walston-Hoover Stadium; Waverly, IA	W 50–14	650
November 13	1:00 p.m.	at Simpson		Buxton Stadium; Indianola, IA	W 55–23	1,094
*Non-conference game; ^{†}Homecoming; Rankings from D3Football.com Poll released prior to the game; All times are in Central time

== Awards and honors ==
All-Conference
Player	Position	Team	Year
Eli Barrett	DB	1	SR
Antonio Santillan	LB	1	SR
Hunter Clasen	RB	1	JR
Ethan Lape	OG	1	SR
JoJo McNair	DB	2	SR
Jordan Downing	DL	2	JR
Freddie Hosch	DL	2	SR
Owen Grover	LB	2	JR
JoJo McNair	RS	2	SR
Ben Bryant	RS	HM	So
Jace Moore	OB	HM	SR
HM = Honorable mention. Reference:
