= 2021 Saint John's Johnnies football team =

American college football season

2021 Saint John's Johnnies football

MIAC champion MIAC Northwoods Division champion

MIAC Championship Game, W 29–28 vs. Bethel

NCAA Division III Second Round, L 28–31 vs. Linfield
- Conference: Minnesota Intercollegiate Athletic Conference
- Northwoods Division

Ranking
- AFCA: No. 5
- D3Football.com: No. 5
- Record: 11–1 (8–0 MIAC)
- Head coach: Gary Fasching (8th season)
- Offensive coordinator: Kole Heckendorf (3rd season)
- Defensive coordinator: Jerry Haugen (45th season)
- Home stadium: Clemens Stadium

2021 Minnesota Intercollegiate Athletic Conference football standings
	Div			Conf.			Overall
Team	W		L	W		L	W		L
Northwoods Division
No. 8 Saint John's (MN) x$^	4	–	0	8	–	0	11	–	1
Gustavus Adolphus	3	–	1	6	–	2	8	–	2
St. Olaf	2	–	2	4	–	4	5	–	5
Carleton	1	–	3	5	–	3	7	–	3
St. Scholastica	0	–	4	0	–	8	0	–	8
Skyline Division
No. 18 Bethel (MN) x^	4	–	0	6	–	2	8	–	3
Concordia–Moorhead	3	–	1	3	–	5	4	–	6
Augsburg	2	–	2	4	–	4	4	–	6
Macalester	1	–	3	2	–	6	3	–	7
Hamline	0	–	4	2	–	6	4	–	6
Championship: Saint John's (MN) 29, Bethel (MN) 28
$ – Conference champion; x – Division champion/co-champions; ^ – NCAA Division III playoff participant; As of November 17, 2021; Rankings from AFCA Poll

The 2021 Saint John's Johnnies football team represented Saint John's University as a member of the Minnesota Intercollegiate Athletic Conference (MIAC) during the 2021 NCAA Division III football season. Led by eighth-year head coach Gary Fasching, the Johnnies compiled an overall record of 11–1 with a mark of 8–0 in conference play. They finished first the MIAC's Northwoods Division and beat the Bethel Royals, winners of the MIAC's Skyline Division in the MIAC Championship Game. As MIAC champion, Saint John's received and automatic bid to the NCAA Division III Football Championship playoffs, where the defeated Lake Forest in the first round before losing to Linfield in the second round. The Johnnies played home games at Clemens Stadium in Collegeville, Minnesota.

== Schedule ==
Date	Time	Opponent	Rank	Site	Result	Attendance
September 4	1:00 p.m.	No. 23 Aurora*	No. 6	Clemens Stadium; Collegeville, MN	W 39–33	8,688
September 18	1:00 p.m.	Martin Luther*	No. 7	Clemens Stadium; Collegeville, MN	W 55–7	5,421
September 25	1:00 p.m.	No. 13 Bethel (MN)	No. 6	Clemens Stadium; Collegeville, MN	W 31–25	9,133
October 2	1:00 p.m.	at Concordia–Moorhead	No. 6	Jake Christiansen Stadium; Moorhead, MN	W 49–0	5,980
October 9	1:00 p.m.	Augsburg^{†}	No. 6	Clemens Stadium; Collegeville, MN	W 50–0	9,891
October 16	1:00 p.m.	St. Olaf	No. 5	Clemens Stadium; Collegeville, MN (Family Weekend)	W 56–0	8,963
October 23	1:00 p.m.	at Gustavus Adolphus	No. 5	Hollingsworth Field; St. Peter, MN	W 37–7	3,173
October 30	1:00 p.m.	St. Scholastica	No. 5	Clemens Stadium; Collegeville, MN	W 81–0	4,638
November 6	1:00 p.m.	at Carleton	No. 5	Laird Stadium; Northfield, MN	W 38–10	3,174
November 13	1:00 p.m.	at No. 13 Bethel (MN)	No. 5	Royal Stadium; Arden Hills, MN (MIAC Championship Game)	W 29–28	5,982
November 20	12:00 p.m.	No. 24 Lake Forest*	No. 5	Clemens Stadium; Collegeville, MN (NCAA Division III First Round)	W 41–14	2,833
November 27	12:00 p.m.	No. 6 Linfield*	No. 5	Clemens Stadium; Collegeville, MN (NCAA Division III Second Round)	L 31–28	2,378
*Non-conference game; ^{†}Homecoming; Rankings from D3Football.com Poll released prior to the game; All times are in central time; Source:

== Rankings ==
Ranking movements Legend: ██ Increase in ranking ██ Decrease in ranking
	Week												
Poll	Pre	1	2	3	4	5	6	7	8	9	10	11	Final
D3football.com	6	6	7	6	6	6	5	5	5	5	5	5	8
AFCA	Not released												
