= 2023 North Central Cardinals football team =

American college football season

2023 North Central Cardinals football

CCIW champion

Stagg Bowl, L 37–38 vs. Cortland
- Conference: College Conference of Illinois and Wisconsin
- Record: 14–1 (9–0 CCIW)
- Head coach: Brad Spencer (2nd season)
- Offensive coordinator: Eric Stuedemann (2nd season)
- Offensive scheme: West Coast spread
- Defensive coordinator: Shane Dierking (5th season)
- Base defense: 4–3
- Home stadium: Benedetti–Wehrli Stadium

2023 College Conference of Illinois and Wisconsin football standings
	Conf.			Overall
Team	W		L	W		L
No. 2 North Central (IL) $^	9	–	0	14	–	1
No. 12 Wheaton (IL) ^	8	–	1	10	–	2
Augustana (IL)	7	–	2	8	–	3
Washington University	6	–	3	7	–	3
Carroll (WI)	4	–	5	5	–	5
North Park	4	–	5	5	–	5
Carthage	3	–	6	3	–	7
Elmhurst	2	–	7	3	–	7
Illinois Wesleyan	2	–	7	2	–	8
Millikin	0	–	9	0	–	10
$ – Conference champion; ^ – NCAA Division III playoff participant; Rankings from D3Football.com

The 2023 North Central Cardinals football team was an American football team that represented North Central College of Naperville, Illinois, as a member of the College Conference of Illinois and Wisconsin (CCIW) during the 2023 NCAA Division III football season. In their second year under head coach Brad Spencer, the Cardinals compiled a 14–1 record (9–0 against conference opponents), won the CCIW championship, and were ranked No. 1 in Division III at the end of the regular season.

The team advanced to the Division III playoffs where they defeated Belhaven (65–0) in the first round, Trinity (TX) (71–28) in the second round, Wisconsin–La Crosse (55–42) in the quarterfinals, and Wartburg (34–27) in the semifinals. The Cardinals were then defeated by Cortland, 38–37, in the Stagg Bowl, the Division III championship game. North Central scored with 1:20 remaining against Cortland but was stopped on an attempted two-point conversion.

Prior to the loss to Cortland, the Cardinals had won 29 consecutive games and appeared in four consecutive Division III championship games, winning national championships in 2019 and 2022.

The team broke CCIW offensive records with 576 points and 5,504 total yards in nine conference games. Through all 15 games, the Cardinals scored an NCAA record 879 points, an average of 58.6 points per game.

The team was led by quarterback Luke Lehnen, who won the Gagliardi Trophy as the Division III player of the year. Other key players included running back Joe Sacco, wide receiver DeAngelo Hardy, and linebacker BJ Adamchik.

== Schedule ==
Date	Time	Opponent	Rank	Site	Result	Attendance	Source
September 2	1:00 p.m.	at Roosevelt*	No. 1	Morris Field; Arlington Heights, IL	W 41–7	1,132	
September 16	1:00 p.m.	Carthage	No. 1	Benedetti–Wehrli Stadium; Naperville, IL	W 70–0	1,100	
September 23	2:00 p.m.	at Elmhurst	No. 1	Langhorst Field; Elmhurst, IL	W 59–6	2,400	
September 30	1:00 p.m.	at No. 8 Wheaton (IL)	No. 1	McCully Stadium; Wheaton, IL (Battle for the Little Brass Bell)	W 54–35	5,102	
October 7	6:00 p.m.	Carroll (WI)^{†}	No. 1	Benedetti–Wehrli Stadium; Naperville, IL	W 69–24	4,000	
October 14	1:00 p.m.	at Millikin	No. 1	Frank M. Lindsay Field; Decatur, IL	W 75–3	800	
October 21	1:00 p.m.	Washington University	No. 1	Benedetti–Wehrli Stadium; Naperville, IL	W 49–3	2,700	
October 28	1:00 p.m.	at North Park	No. 1	Holmgren Athletic Complex; Chicago, IL	W 56–0	445	
November 4	1:00 p.m.	Illinois Wesleyan	No. 1	Benedetti–Wehrli Stadium; Naperville, IL	W 83–26	2,800	
November 11	12:00 p.m.	at Augustana (IL)	No. 1	Lindberg Stadium; Rock Island, IL	W 61–17	2,286	
November 18	12:00 p.m.	Belhaven*	No. 1	Benedetti–Wehrli Stadium; Naperville, IL (NCAA Division III first round)	W 65–0	1,338	
November 25	12:00 p.m.	No. 4 Trinity (TX)*	No. 1	Benedetti–Wehrli Stadium; Naperville, IL (NCAA Division III second round)	W 71–28	1,169	
December 2	12:00 p.m.	at No. 6 Wisconsin–La Crosse*	No. 1	Veterans Memorial Field; La Crosse, WI (NCAA Division III quarterfinal)	W 55–42	2,422	
December 9	2:33 p.m.	at No. 3 Wartburg*	No. 1	Walston-Hoover Stadium; Waverly, IA (NCAA Division III semifinal)	W 34–27	3,525	
December 15	7:03 p.m.	vs. Cortland*	No. 1	Salem Football Stadium; Salem, VA (Stagg Bowl)	L 37–38	3,381	
*Non-conference game; ^{†}Homecoming; Rankings from AFCA Poll released prior to the game; All times are in Central time

== Coaching staff ==
- Brad Spencer, head coach
- Shane Dierking, assistant head coach, defensive coordinator, linebackers coach
- Eric Stuedemann, offensive coordinator, offensive line coach, recruiting coordinator
- Colin Wood, special teams coordinator, cornerbacks coach
- Joe Fehrle, tight end coach, strength coordinator
- DJ Warkenthien, defensive line coach assistant strength coordinator
- Sharmore Clarke, offensive line coach
