= Gary Fasching =

American football coach

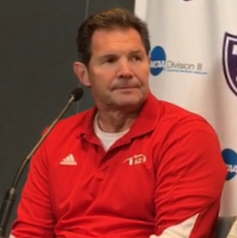
- Fasching in 2019

Current position
- Title: Head coach
- Team: Saint John's (MN)
- Conference: MIAC
- Record: 127–22

Biographical details
- Born: c. 1958 (age 67–68)

Playing career
- 1977–1980: Saint John's (MN)
- Position: Linebacker

Coaching career (HC unless noted)
- 1986–1995: St. Cloud Cathedral HS (MN)
- 1996–2012: Saint John's (MN) (assistant)
- 2013–present: Saint John's (MN)

Head coaching record
- Overall: 127–22 (college); 57–46 (high school)
- Tournaments: 12–10 (NCAA D-III playoffs)

Accomplishments and honors

Championships
- 6 MIAC (2014, 2018–2019, 2021–2022, 2024); 3 MIAC Northwoods Division (2021–2022, 2024)

Awards
- 5× MIAC Coach of the Year (2014, 2017–2019, 2021)

Gary Fasching is an American college football coach. He is the head football coach for Saint John's University, a position he has held since 2013. He succeeded John Gagliardi as head coach after working as an assistant under him for 17 seasons. Fasching was the head football coach at Cathedral High School in St. Cloud, Minnesota from 1986 to 1995, winning two state championships.

== Head coaching record ==
=== College ===
| Year | Team | Overall | Conference | Standing | Bowl/playoffs | D3^{#} | AFCA^{°} |
|---|---|---|---|---|---|---|---|
Saint John's Johnnies (Minnesota Intercollegiate Athletic Conference) (2013–present)
| 2013 | Saint John's | 7–3 | 5–3 | 4th | | | |
| 2014 | Saint John's | 10–2 | 7–1 | 1st | L NCAA Division III Second Round | 12 | |
| 2015 | Saint John's | 10–2 | 7–1 | 2nd | L NCAA Division III Second Round | 10 | |
| 2016 | Saint John's | 10–2 | 7–1 | 2nd | L NCAA Division III Second Round | 9 | |
| 2017 | Saint John's | 9–2 | 7–1 | 2nd | L NCAA Division III First Round | 14 | |
| 2018 | Saint John's | 12–1 | 8–0 | 1st | L NCAA Division III Quarterfinal | 3 | |
| 2019 | Saint John's | 12–2 | 7–1 | 1st | L NCAA Division III Semifinal | 4 | |
| 2020–21 | No team—COVID-19 | | | | | | |
| 2021 | Saint John's | 11–1 | 8–0 | 1st (Northwoods) | L NCAA Division III Second Round | 8 | |
| 2022 | Saint John's | 10–2 | 7–1 | 1st (Northwoods) | L NCAA Division III Second Round | 7 | |
| 2023 | Saint John's | 8–2 | 7–1 | 2nd (Northwoods) | | 19 | 22 |
| 2024 | Saint John's | 11–1 | 8–0 | 1st (Northwoods) | L NCAA Division III Third Round | 3 | 4 |
| 2025 | Saint John's | 10–2 | 8–1 | 2nd | L NCAA Division III Third Round | 11 | 8 |
| 2026 | Saint John's | 7–0 | 6–0 | | | | |
| Saint John's: | | 127–22 | 92–11 | | | | |
| Total: | | 127–22 | | | | | |
National championship Conference title Conference division title or championship game berth

== See also ==
- List of college football career coaching winning percentage leaders
