= Curt Fitzpatrick =

American football coach (born c. 1982)

Current position
- Title: Head coach
- Team: Colgate
- Conference: Patriot League
- Record: 9–10

Biographical details
- Born: c. 1982 (age 43–44); Fulton, New York, U.S.
- Education: St. John Fisher University (2004); Ohio University (2012)

Playing career
- 2000–2004: St. John Fisher
- Position: Quarterback

Coaching career (HC unless noted)
- 2005: Fulton HS (NY) (QB/WR)
- 2006–2007: St. John Fisher (QB)
- 2008–2012: Utica (OC/QB)
- 2013–2019: Morrisville
- 2020–2024: Cortland
- 2025–present: Colgate

Head coaching record
- Overall: 89–53
- Tournaments: 7–3 (NCAA D-III playoffs)

Accomplishments and honors

Championships
- 1 NCAA Division III (2023); 1 NJAC (2014); 4 Empire 8 (2021–2024)

Awards
- D3football.com National Coach of the Year (2023)

Curt Fitzpatrick (born c. 1982) is an American college football coach. He is the head football coach for Colgate University, a position he has held since 2025. He also was the head football coach for the State University of New York at Morrisville from 2013 to 2019 and State University of New York at Cortland from 2020 to 2024. He was an assistant coach for Fulton High School, St. John Fisher, and Utica. He played college football for St. John Fisher as a quarterback.

== Head coaching record ==
Year	Team	Overall	Conference	Standing	Bowl/playoffs	D3^{#}	AFCA^{°}
Morrisville Mustangs (New Jersey Athletic Conference) (2013–2014)
2013	Morrisville	3–7	2–5	6th			
2014	Morrisville	9–2	6–1	T–1st			
Morrisville Mustangs (Empire 8) (2015–2019)
2015	Morrisville	6–4	4–4	5th			
2016	Morrisville	1–9	0–8	9th			
2017	Morrisville	4–6	2–5	T–5th			
2018	Morrisville	6–5	4–3	T–3rd			
2019	Morrisville	6–5	4–2	3rd			
Morrisville:		35–38	22–28				
Cortland Red Dragons (Empire 8) (2020–2024)
2020–21	No team—COVID-19						
2021	Cortland	11–1	6–0	1st	L NCAA Division III Second Round	16	
2022	Cortland	9–2	6–0	1st	L NCAA Division III First Round	19	
2023	Cortland	14–1	7–0	1st	W NCAA Division III Championship	1	1
2024	Cortland	11–1	7–0	1st	L NCAA Division III Third Round	2	2
Cortland:		45–5	26–0				
Colgate Raiders (Patriot League) (2025–present)
2025	Colgate	5–7	3–4	T–3rd			
2026	Colgate	4–3	3–1				
Colgate:		9–10	6–5				
Total:		89–53					
National championship Conference title Conference division title or championship game berth
