= Pedro Arruza =

American football coach (born c. 1973)

Current position
- Title: Head coach
- Team: Randolph–Macon
- Conference: ODAC
- Record: 156–73

Biographical details
- Born: c. 1973 (age 52–53); West Palm Beach, Florida, U.S.
- Education: The King's Academy (1992); Wheaton College (1995); Butler University (1999)

Playing career
- 1992–1995: Wheaton (IL)
- Position: Running back

Coaching career (HC unless noted)
- 1996–1997: Battle Ground HS (TN) (RB/DB)
- 1998: Butler (DB)
- 1999–2000: Washington University (DB)
- 2001–2003: Washington University (DC/DB)
- 2004–present: Randolph–Macon

Head coaching record
- Overall: 156–73
- Tournaments: 6–7 (NCAA D-III playoffs)

Accomplishments and honors

Championships
- 10 ODAC (2007–2008, 2016, 2018, 2020–2025)

Awards
- Wheaton (IL) Hall of Honor (2011); 3× Division III All-American (1993–1995); 3× First Team All-CCIW (1993–1995)

Pedro Arruza (born c. 1973) is an American college football coach. He is the head football coach for Randolph–Macon College, a position he has held since 2004. He also coached for Battle Ground Academy, Butler, and Washington University. He played college football for Wheaton (IL) as a running back, setting program records for rushing yards in a career (3,179) and a single game (313).

== Head coaching record ==
Year	Team	Overall	Conference	Standing	Bowl/playoffs	D3^{#}	AFCA^{°}
Randolph–Macon Yellow Jackets (Old Dominion Athletic Conference) (2004–present)
2004	Randolph–Macon	3–7	2–4	5th			
2005	Randolph–Macon	2–8	1–5	T–5th			
2006	Randolph–Macon	2–8	0–6	7th			
2007	Randolph–Macon	8–2	5–1	T–1st			
2008	Randolph–Macon	6–5	4–2	T–1st	L NCAA Division III First Round		
2009	Randolph–Macon	6–4	4–2	T–2nd			
2010	Randolph–Macon	7–3	3–3	4th			
2011	Randolph–Macon	8–2	4–2	3rd			
2012	Randolph–Macon	7–3	5–2	2nd			
2013	Randolph–Macon	7–3	5–2	T–2nd			
2014	Randolph–Macon	5–5	3–4	5th			
2015	Randolph–Macon	4–6	3–4	5th			
2016	Randolph–Macon	9–2	6–1	1st	L NCAA Division III First Round		
2017	Randolph–Macon	7–3	4–2	T–2nd			
2018	Randolph–Macon	9–3	6–1	1st	L NCAA Division III Second Round	18	
2019	Randolph–Macon	9–2	7–1	2nd			
2020–21	Randolph–Macon	5–0	4–0	1st			
2021	Randolph–Macon	9–1	5–1	T–1st		20	
2022	Randolph–Macon	11–1	7–0	1st	L NCAA Division III Second Round	13	
2023	Randolph–Macon	13–1	7–0	1st	L NCAA Division III Semifinal	7	6
2024	Randolph–Macon	10–2	7–0	1st	L NCAA Division III Third Round		22
2025	Randolph–Macon	9–2	8–0	1st	L NCAA Division III Second Round	22	21
2026	Randolph–Macon	0–0	0–0				
Randolph–Macon:		156–73	100–43				
Total:		156–73					
National championship Conference title Conference division title or championship game berth
