= 2023 Saint John's Johnnies football team =

American college football season

2023 Saint John's Johnnies football
- Conference: Minnesota Intercollegiate Athletic Conference
- Northwoods Division

Ranking
- AFCA: No. 20
- D3Football.com: No. 16
- Record: 8–2 (7–1 MIAC)
- Head coach: Gary Fasching (10th season)
- Offensive coordinator: Kole Heckendorf (6th season)
- Defensive coordinator: Jerry Haugen (47th season)
- Home stadium: Clemens Stadium

2023 Minnesota Intercollegiate Athletic Conference football standings
	Div			Conf.			Overall
Team	W		L	W		L	W		L
Northwoods Division
Gustavus Adolphus xy	4	–	0	5	–	3	6	–	4
No. 19 Saint John's (MN)	3	–	1	7	–	1	8	–	2
Carleton	2	–	2	5	–	3	7	–	3
St. Olaf	1	–	3	4	–	4	5	–	5
St. Scholastica	0	–	4	1	–	7	2	–	8
Skyline Division
Bethel (MN) xy$^	4	–	0	7	–	1	8	–	3
Concordia–Moorhead	3	–	1	4	–	4	5	–	5
Augsburg	2	–	2	4	–	4	6	–	4
Hamline	1	–	3	2	–	6	4	–	6
Macalester	0	–	4	1	–	7	3	–	7
Championship: Bethel (MN) 31, Gustavus Adolphus 7
$ – Conference champion; x – Division champion/co-champions; y – Championship game participant; ^ – NCAA Division III playoff participant; Rankings from D3Football.com

The 2023 Saint John's Johnnies football team represented Saint John's University as a member of the Northwoods Division of the Minnesota Intercollegiate Athletic Conference (MIAC) during the 2023 NCAA Division III football season. Led by tenth-year head coach Gary Fasching, the Johnnies compiled an overall record of 8–2 with a mark of 7–1 in conference play, placing second the MIAC's Northwoods Division. Saint John's failed to advanced to the NCAA Division III Football Championship playoffs for the first time since 2013. The team played home games at Clemens Stadium in Collegeville, Minnesota.

== Schedule ==
Saint John's announced its 2023 regular season schedule on March 1, 2023. It consisted of five home games and five away games.

Date	Time	Opponent	Rank	Site	Result	Attendance
September 2	12:00 p.m.	No. 4 Trinity (TX)*	No. 6	Clemens Stadium; Collegeville, MN	W 34–31 ^{OT}	9,883
September 9	1:00 p.m.	at No. 8 Wisconsin–Whitewater*	No. 4	Perkins Stadium; Whitewater, WI	L 56–28	15,236
September 23	1:00 p.m.	No. 19 Bethel (MN)	No. 8	Clemens Stadium; Collegeville, MN	W 27–7	11,321
September 30	1:00 p.m.	at Augsburg	No. 7	Edor Nelson Field; Minneapolis, MN	W 24–27	1,413
October 7	1:00 p.m.	Concordia–Moorhead	No. 7	Clemens Stadium; Collegeville, MN	W 42–23	6,219
October 14	1:00 p.m.	Carleton^{†}	No. 8	Clemens Stadium; Collegeville, MN	W 63–7	10,477
October 21	1:00 p.m.	at Gustavus Adolphus	No. 7	Hollingsworth Field; St. Peter, MN	L 38–35	2,437
October 28	1:00 p.m.	St. Scholastica	No. 18	Clemens Stadium; Collegeville, MN	W 62–7	2,981
November 4	1:00 p.m.	at St. Olaf	No. 19	Klein Field at Manitou; Northfield, MN	W 49–10	564
November 11	1:00 p.m.	at Concordia–Moorhead	No. 20	Jake Christiansen Stadium; Moorhead, MN (MIAC Week)	W 48–21	2,213
*Non-conference game; ^{†}Homecoming; Rankings from D3Football.com Poll released prior to the game; All times are in central time; Source:

== Rankings ==
Ranking movements Legend: ██ Increase in ranking ██ Decrease in ranking
	Week												
Poll	Pre	1	2	3	4	5	6	7	8	9	10	11	Final
D3football.com	6	4	9	8	7	7	8	7	18	19	20	16	
AFCA	Not released			11	9	9	8	9	20	21	20		

== Game summaries ==
=== vs No. 4 Trinity (TX) ===
	1	2	3	4	OT	Total
No. 4 Tigers	7	14	7	3	0	31
No. 6 Johnnies	7	0	7	17	3	34

Statistics	TU	SJU
First downs	21	21
Total yards	438	368
Rushing yards	65	87
Passing yards	373	281
Turnovers	4	0
Time of possession	33:57	26:03

=== vs No. 8 Wisconsin–Whitewater ===
	1	2	3	4	Total
No. 4 Johnnies	7	14	7	0	28
No. 8 Warhawks	7	14	14	21	56

Statistics	WW	SJU
First downs	17	25
Total yards	299	513
Rushing yards	38	280
Passing yards	261	233
Time of possession	28:32	31:28

== Statistics ==
=== Scoring ===
==== Scoring by quarter (non-conference opponents) ====
	1	2	3	4	OT	Total
Non-Conference Opponents	14	28	21	24	0	87
Saint Johns Johnnies	14	14	14	17	3	62

==== Scoring by quarter (MIAC opponents) ====
	1	2	3	4	Total
MIAC Opponents	0	0	0	0	0
Saint Johns Johnnies	0	0	0	0	0

==== Scoring by quarter (All opponents) ====
	1	2	3	4	OT	Total
All Opponents	14	28	21	24	0	87
Saint Johns Johnnies	14	14	14	17	3	62

== Roster ==
2023 Saint John's Johnnies football team roster
Players
Coaches
Offense

Pos.	#	Name	Class
TE	0	Joey Gendreau	So
WR	1	Marselio Mendez	Jr
RB	2	Takhi Vaughn	So
WR	2	Todd Jager	Sr
WR	2	Dylan Wheeler	So
QB	3	Zander Dittbenner	So
QB	4	Cooper Downs	Jr
WR	4	Riley Schwellenbach	Fr
WR	5	Joey Moberg	Jr
QB	6	Aaron Syverson	Sr
QB	7	Cooper Drews	Fr
WR	7	Nick VanErp	Sr
TE	8	Alex Larson	Sr
QB	9	Lucas Jansky	So
RB	9	Troy Feddema	Sr
WR	10	R. J. Altidort	Sr
WR	11	Jimmy Buck	Sr
QB	12	Kristof Kowalkowski	Jr
QB	13	E. J. Hosty	Fr
WR	13	Jaden-Bryce Smith	Fr
QB	14	Caden Renslow	Fr
QB	15	Vincent Pyne	Fr
WR	15	Tommy Barrett	So
QB	16	Jake Deutschman	So
QB	17	Ryan Warford	Fr
WR	17	Brady VanErp	Jr
QB	18	Nick Peterson	Sr
WR	18	Caden Caligiuri	Fr
WR	19	Owen Amrhein	So
WR	20	Wyatt Sawatzke	So
RB	21	Dylan Kirchner	Fr
WR	21	Jake Johnson	Fr
RB	22	Jaxson Sawyer	Fr
RB	23	Quincy Suggs	Jr
TE	23	Jack Foster	So
RB	25	Devin Vouk	Sr
RB	26	Tony Underwood	Sr
RB	27	Caden Wheeler	So
WR	27	A. J. Loch	Jr
RB	28	Quinn Christoffersen	Jr
WR	29	Jakari Hunnecook	Sr
RB	30	Corey Bohmert	Fr
WR	31	Thomas Jacobs	Fr
RB	32	Henry Truebenbach	Jr
RB	33	Tyler Hoheisel	Fr
RB	35	Josh Muehlbauer	Fr
WR	36	Eddie Sirek	So
WR	37	Sam Nolan	Fr
RB	38	Isaiah Traufler	Sr
WR	39	Andrew Schaffer	Fr
TE	41	Andrew Harren	Fr
OL	50	Nick McKenzie	Jr
OL	51	Barrett Van Deun	Fr
OL	53	Spencer Gustin	Jr
OL	54	Grant Peroutka	Jr
OL	55	Tom Soler	Jr
OL	56	Eddie Reece	So
OL	57	Colton Rada	Fr
OL	58	Will Caldwell	Fr
OL	59	Ethan Sutton	Sr
OL	60	Ian DeGross	So
OL	61	Matt Peterson	Fr
OL	62	Isaak Nowak	Fr
OL	63	Joe Vascellaro	Jr
OL	64	Joe Jaeger	Sr
OL	65	Sean Lew	Jr
OL	66	Luke Wright	So
OL	67	Hank Smith	Sr
OL	69	Henry Anderson	Fr
OL	70	Alex Markgraf	So
OL	71	Mathias Lundgren	Fr
OL	72	Charlie Folkens	Jr
OL	73	Rylan Turqueza	Fr
OL	74	Ethan Lincoln	Fr
OL	76	Jack Stevens	So
OL	77	Carter Trom	So
OL	78	Michael Bougie	Fr
OL	79	Tommy Hessburg	Jr
WR	80	Vinny Gagliardi	Sr
WR	81	Graham Beltrand	Jr
WR	82	Matt Miller	Jr
WR	83	John Hawkins	So
WR	84	Peyton Gremmels	So
TE	85	Trey Steinbach	Jr
WR	86	Cade Berg	Fr
WR	87	Josh Delange	So
TE	88	Charlie Plum	So
WR	89	Parker Durkin	Fr

Defense

Pos.	#	Name	Class
DL	0	Amari Curtis	Sr
LB	1	Andrew Hamilton	Sr
LB	3	Cooper Yaggie	Jr
LB	4	Patrick Doran	Sr
DB	5	Graham Gerlach	Jr
DB	6	Isaac Potter	So
DB	7	Evan Wahlin	So
DB	8	Peyton Goettlicher	Fr
DB	9	Jamari Edwards	Sr
DL	9	Joe Akoh	Sr
DB	10	Mateo Cisneros	Sr
DB	10	David Gogins	Fr
DB	11	Noah Arneson	So
DB	12	Logan Jans	Fr
DB	13	Nate Trewick	Sr
LB	14	Alex Harren	So
DB	15	Brandon Ruikka	Sr
DB	16	Blake Simonson	So
DB	17	Lukas Soto	Sr
DB	18	Ethan Stark	Sr
DB	19	Sanders Asplin	Sr
LB	20	Cam Jackson	Sr
DB	21	Nolan Rueter	Jr
DB	22	Charlie Ryks	So
LB	22	Jake Palmer	Sr
LB	23	Aiden McMahon	Fr
DB	24	Cayden Saxon	Sr
DB	25	Conor Chalmers	Sr
LB	25	Zachariah Hunter	So
DB	26	Jack Savasten	Jr
DB	28	Ryan Sanvik	Jr
DB	29	Cage Linton	Jr
DB	30	Ezra Noska	Sr
DB	31	Dylan Hanson	Fr
DB	32	Khalil Nance	Sr
LB	32	Jake Schwinghammer	Jr
DB	33	Hillary Makori	Sr
LB	33	Tate Link	Fr
LB	34	Andrew Molenaar	So
DB	35	Ethan Kunkel	Fr
LB	35	Mason Wolf	Sr
DB	36	Griffin Schneider	So
LB	37	Zach Helfmann	Fr
DB	38	Jack Klein	Fr
LB	39	D. J. Myles	Jr
DB	40	Blake Ehlert	Jr
DL	40	Isaac Hetland	Jr
LB	41	Beau Boudreaux	Fr
LB	42	Brock Humbert	Sr
LB	43	Hayden Sanders	Jr
LB	44	Sam Lewison	Sr
DL	45	Vinny Wanda	So
LB	46	Ben Dahl	Jr
DB	47	Liam O'Malley	Jr
LB	47	Joe Rossebo	Sr
LB	48	Jack Bjork	Sr
LB	49	Erik Bjork	Sr
LB	50	J. P. Weber	Fr
DL	51	Henry Bendickson	Fr
DL	52	J. P. Johnson	Fr
DL	53	Dawson Van Meter	Jr
LB	53	Kaden Lukkes	So
LB	54	Eric Jurek	Fr
DL	55	Keenan Turqueza	Sr
LB	56	Drew Schmidt	So
LB	57	Garret Strating	Sr
DL	58	Nathan Carroll	Fr
LB	59	Jayden Leach	So
LB	60	Jackson Carlson	Fr
LB	64	Jack Hillman	So
DL	65	T. J. Graves	So
DL	66	Will Mahowald	Fr
DL	67	Mitch Vener	So
DL	70	Caleb Thom	So
DL	73	Jack Krza	So
DL	75	Caleb Poyer	Fr
DL	77	Cody Kwak	Fr
LB	80	Gavin Zolvinski	So
DL	82	Etah Akoh	Jr
DL	83	Alex Lundebrek	Jr
DL	84	Jacob Omtvedt	Sr
DL	86	Mark Roane	Sr
DL	87	Jordan Borgeson	Jr
DL	88	Joe Bisso	Fr
DL	89	Jackson Kirchner	Fr
DL	90	Landon Gallagher	Jr
DL	91	Dylan Owens	So
DL	92	Chandler Obering	So
DL	93	Riley DeRosier	So
DL	94	Ben Karr	So
DL	95	Travis Johnson	Jr
LB	96	Riley Kangas	Jr
DL	97	Zach Frank	Jr
DL	98	Tommy Gilmore	Jr
DL	99	Cole Engen	So

Special teams

Pos.	#	Name	Class
K	12	Conor Murphy	Jr
LS	45	Jack Eibensteiner	Sr
K/P	90	Matt Hansen	Fr
P	95	Spencer Ell	Sr
K/P	95	David Roberts	So

Head coach

- Gary Fasching

Coordinators/assistant coaches

- Jerry Haugen – Defensive Coordinator
- Kole Heckendorf – Offensive Coordinator/Receivers
- Brandon Novak – Co-Defensive Coordinator/Defensive Backs
- Damien Dumonceaux – Recruiting Coordinator/Defensive Line/Special Teams
- Josh Bungum – Running Backs
- Mike Manguson – Offensive Line
- Ben Eli – Offensive line
- Alexi Johnson – Kickers
- Max Jackson – Defensive Assistant/Diversity & Student Success
- Andy Auger – Volunteer Assistant/Defense
- Collin Franz – Defensive Assistant/Defensive Line
- Tom Wicka – Volunteer Assistant/Linebackers
- Graydon Kulick – Quarterbacks

Legend

- (C) Team captain
- (S) Suspended
- (I) Ineligible
- Injured
- Redshirt

Roster
Last update: August 25, 2023
