= 2023 Stagg Bowl =

NCAA Division III college football championship game

2023 NCAA Division III Football Championship
- Stagg Bowl L
| Cortland Red Dragons | North Central Cardinals |
| (13–1) | (14–0) |
| Empire 8 | CCIW |
| 38 | 37 |
| Head coach: Curt Fitzpatrick | Head coach: Brad Spencer |
| | 1 | 2 | 3 | 4 | Total |
|---|---|---|---|---|---|
| Cortland | 0 | 3 | 14 | 21 | 38 |
| North Central | 0 | 7 | 10 | 20 | 37 |
- Date: December 15, 2023
- Season: 2023
- Stadium: Salem Football Stadium
- Location: Salem, Virginia
- Attendance: 3,381

United States TV coverage
- Network: ESPNU

The 2023 NCAA Division III Football Championship Game, more commonly referred to as the 2023 Stagg Bowl or Stagg Bowl L, was a postseason college football game scheduled played on December 15, 2023, at Salem Football Stadium in Salem, Virginia. It determined a national champion in NCAA Division III for the 2023 season. The game began at 7:00 p.m. EST, and aired on ESPNU. The game featured the two finalists of the 32-team single elimination playoff bracket, Cortland and North Central; Cortland won 38–37 to claim their first national championship.

== Teams ==
The participants of the 2023 NCAA Division III Football Championship Game were the finalists of the 2023 Division III Playoffs, a 32-team single elimination brackets tournament which began on November 18. The winners of each of the four 8-team regions qualified for the national semifinals.

=== National semifinals ===
Semifinals; December 9 Asterisk denotes host
Cortland | 49
* | Randolph–Macon | 14
North Central | 34
* | Wartburg | 27

National Championship; December 15; Salem Football Stadium, Salem, VA
Cortland | 38
North Central | 37

== Game summary ==
2023 Stagg Bowl

| Quarter | 1 | 2 | 3 | 4 | Total |
|---|---|---|---|---|---|
| Cortland | 0 | 3 | 14 | 21 | 38 |
| North Central | 0 | 7 | 10 | 20 | 37 |

at Salem Football Stadium • Salem, Virginia

- Date: Friday, December 15, 2023
- Game time: 7:00 p.m. EST
- Game weather: Clear • Temperature: 45 °F (7 °C) • Wind: E 0 mph
- Game attendance: 3,381
- Referee: Justin Ackley
- TV: ESPNU

Scoring summary

| Quarter | Time | Drive | | | Team | Scoring information | Score | |
| Quarter | Time | Plays | Yards | TOP | Team | Scoring information | Cortland | North Central |
|---|---|---|---|---|---|---|---|---|
| 2 | 0:57 | 15 | 92 | 6:21 | North Central | Charles Coleman 7-yard touchdown reception from Luke Lehnen, Sean Ryniec kick good | 0 | 7 |
| 2 | 0:02 | 7 | 55 | 0:55 | Cortland | 31-yard field goal by Mike Baloga | 3 | 7 |
| 3 | 11:33 | 7 | 72 | 3:27 | Cortland | Cole Burgess 9-yard touchdown reception from Zac Boyes, Mike Baloga kick good | 10 | 7 |
| 3 | 6:34 | 5 | 47 | 2:14 | North Central | Joe Sacco 4-yard touchdown run, Sean Ryniec kick good | 10 | 14 |
| 3 | 6:21 | 2 | 65 | 0:13 | Cortland | JJ Laap 65-yard touchdown reception from Zac Boyes, Mike Baloga kick good | 17 | 14 |
| 3 | 3:16 | 7 | 62 | 3:05 | North Central | 24-yard field goal by Sean Ryniec | 17 | 17 |
| 4 | 14:56 | 8 | 73 | 3:20 | Cortland | Joe Iadevaio 9-yard touchdown reception from Zac Boyes, Mike Baloga kick good | 24 | 17 |
| 4 | 13:39 | 3 | 65 | 1:17 | North Central | Luke Lehnen 4-yard touchdown run, Sean Ryniec kick good | 24 | 24 |
| 4 | 8:16 | 10 | 63 | 5:23 | Cortland | Joe Iadevaio 10-yard touchdown reception from Zac Boyes, Mike Baloga kick good | 31 | 24 |
| 4 | 7:16 | 3 | 71 | 1:00 | North Central | Luke Lehnen 64-yard touchdown run, Sean Ryniec kick good | 31 | 31 |
| 4 | 1:41 | 10 | 73 | 5:35 | Cortland | Cole Burgess 21-yard touchdown reception from Zac Boyes, Mike Baloga kick good | 38 | 31 |
| 4 | 1:20 | 2 | 72 | 0:21 | North Central | DeAngelo Hardy 60-yard touchdown reception from Luke Lehnen, 2-point run by Luke Lehnen was stopped short of the end zone | 38 | 37 |
| "TOP" = time of possession. For other American football terms, see Glossary of American football. | | | | | | | 38 | 37 |

== Statistics ==
Team statistical comparison
| Statistic | Cortland | North Central |
|---|---|---|
| First downs | 28 | 21 |
| First downs rushing | 18 | 7 |
| First downs passing | 9 | 14 |
| First downs penalty | 1 | 0 |
| Third down efficiency | 6–12 | 6–10 |
| Fourth down efficiency | 2–3 | 0–2 |
| Total plays–net yards | 71–503 | 58–583 |
| Rushing attempts–net yards | 37–154 | 41–404 |
| Yards per rush | 4.2 | 9.9 |
| Yards passing | 349 | 179 |
| Pass completions–attempts | 26–34 | 8–17 |
| Interceptions thrown | 0 | 0 |
| Punt returns–total yards | 0–0 | 0–0 |
| Kickoff returns–total yards | 5–105 | 6–136 |
| Punts–average yardage | 2–27.5 | 1–47 |
| Fumbles–lost | 0–0 | 1–1 |
| Penalties–yards | 2–10 | 6–64 |
| Time of possession | 32:43 | 27:17 |

Cortland statistics
Red Dragons passing
| | C–A | Yds | TD–INT |
|---|---|---|---|
| Zac Boyes | 26–34 | 349 | 5–0 |
Red Dragons rushing
| | Car | Yds | TD |
| Zac Boyes | 16 | 123 | 0 |
| Ashton Capone | 5 | 28 | 0 |
| Jaden AlfanoStJohn | 13 | 26 | 0 |
| TEAM | 3 | –15 | 0 |
Red Dragons receiving
| | Rec | Yds | TD |
| Cole Burgess | 11 | 134 | 2 |
| Joe Iadevaio | 8 | 95 | 2 |
| JJ Laap | 2 | 75 | 1 |
| Omari Kendrick | 3 | 26 | 0 |
| Jaden AlfanoStJohn | 2 | 19 | 0 |

North Central statistics
Cardinals passing
| | C–A | Yds | TD–INT |
|---|---|---|---|
| Luke Lehnen | 8–17 | 179 | 2–0 |
Cardinals rushing
| | Car | Yds | TD |
| Joe Sacco | 14 | 157 | 1 |
| Luke Lehnen | 11 | 115 | 2 |
| Charles Coleman | 10 | 94 | 0 |
| Sean Allen | 5 | 38 | 0 |
| DeAngelo Hardy | 1 | 0 | 0 |
Cardinals receiving
| | Rec | Yds | TD |
| DeAngelo Hardy | 5 | 146 | 1 |
| Joe Sacco | 1 | 14 | 0 |
| Jack Rummell | 1 | 12 | 0 |
| Charles Coleman | 1 | 7 | 1 |
