= Carlson Stadium =

Stadium in Decorah, Iowa, US

- Interactive map of Carlson Stadium
- Location: Luther College; Decorah, Iowa 52101
- Coordinates: 43.3122°N 91.8073°W
- Capacity: 5,000
- Surface: Blue Turf

Construction
- Opened: 1966

Tenant
- Luther College Norse (IIAC) (1966-present)

Carlson Stadium is a football stadium in Decorah, Iowa, US. The stadium is home to the Luther College Norse.

The permanent seating grandstand of the stadium is set on the hill on the east side of the field, immediately below the Dahl Centennial Union. Instead of a traditional press box, the stadium PA announcer, game broadcasters, officials and assistant coaches sit in the Union cafeteria, whose windows overlook the field.

Track and Field events are also held at Carlson Stadium, which includes a track around the field. Luther's commencement ceremonies are held at the stadium each May.

Luther College (Iowa) football had previously played at Nustad Field on the east side of the college campus. The Preus Library and a parking lot now occupy the site of Nustad Field.

The location also features an eight-lane 400 meter polyurethane surface track. And also has two directional approaches for pole vaulting and all of the jumping events, two shot put circles, discus and hammer cage, and a runway for the javelin area .
