= 2023 NCAA Division III football rankings =

Rankings for the 2023 NCAA Division III football season

- Season: 2023
- Postseason: Single-elimination
- Preseason No. 1: North Central (IL)
- National champions: Cortland
- Conference with most teams in final poll: WIAC (3)

Two human polls and a committee's selections comprise the 2023 National Collegiate Athletic Association (NCAA) Division III football rankings. Unlike in Division I's Football Bowl Subdivision (FBS), the NCAA, Division III college football's governing body, bestows a national championship on the winner of the Stagg Bowl – the championship round of a 32-team postseason tournament. The main weekly poll that begins in the preseason is the D3football.com poll, which ranks the top 25 colleges in Division III football. The AFCA Division III Coaches Poll is released beginning midway through the season.

== Legend ==
	Increase in ranking
	Decrease in ranking
	Not ranked previous week
	Selected for Division III Football Championship Playoffs
(#–#)	Win–loss record
(Italics)	Number of first place votes
т	Tied with team above or below also with this symbol

== D3football.com poll ==
	Preseason Jul 31	Week 1 Sep 3	Week 2 Sep 10	Week 3 Sep 17	Week 4 Sep 24	Week 5 October 1	Week 6 October 8	Week 7 October 15	Week 8 October 22	Week 9 October 29	Week 10 November 5	Week 11 November 12	Final December 16	
1.	North Central (IL) (22)	North Central (IL) (1–0) (23)	North Central (IL) (1–0) (23)	North Central (IL) (2–0) (24)	North Central (IL) (3–0) (24)	North Central (IL) (4–0) (24)	North Central (IL) (5–0) (25)	North Central (IL) (6–0) (25)	North Central (IL) (7–0) (25)	North Central (IL) (8–0) (25)	North Central (IL) (9–0) (25)	North Central (IL) (10–0) (25)	Cortland (14–1) (25)	1.
2.	Mount Union (3)	Mount Union (1–0) (2)	Mount Union (1–0) (1)	Mount Union (2–0)	Mount Union (3–0)	Mount Union (4–0)	Mount Union (5–0)	Mount Union (6–0)	Mount Union (7–0)	Mount Union (8–0)	Mount Union (9–0)	Mount Union (10–0)	North Central (IL) (14–1)	2.
3.	Mary Hardin–Baylor	Wartburg (1–0)	Wartburg (2–0)	Wartburg (3–0)	Wartburg (4–0)	Wisconsin–Whitewater (4–0) (1)	Wartburg (6–0)	Wartburg (7–0)	Wartburg (8–0)	Wartburg (9–0)	Wartburg (10–0)	Wartburg (10–0)	Wartburg (13–1)	3.
4.	Trinity (TX)	Saint John's (MN) (1–0)	Wisconsin–Whitewater (2–0) (1)	Wisconsin–Whitewater (3–0) (1)	Wisconsin–Whitewater (3–0) (1)	Wartburg (5–0)	Wisconsin–River Falls (5–0)	Wisconsin–La Crosse (5–1)	Wisconsin–La Crosse (6–1)	Wisconsin–La Crosse (7–1)	Wisconsin–La Crosse (8–1)	Wisconsin–La Crosse (9–1)	Wisconsin–La Crosse (11–2)	4.
5.	Wartburg	Trinity (TX) (0–1)	Hardin–Simmons (2–0)	Hardin–Simmons (2–0)	Trinity (TX) (3–1)	Wisconsin–River Falls (4–0)	Trinity (TX) (5–1)	Wisconsin–Whitewater (5–1)	Wisconsin–Whitewater (6–1)	Wisconsin–Whitewater (7–1)	Wisconsin–Whitewater (8–1)	Wisconsin–Whitewater (9–1)	Wisconsin–Whitewater (11–2)	5.
6.	Saint John's (MN)	Hardin–Simmons (1–0)	Trinity (TX) (1–1)	Trinity (TX) (2–1)	Wisconsin–River Falls (3–0)	Trinity (TX) (4–1)	Wisconsin–La Crosse (4–1)	Trinity (TX) (5–1)	Trinity (TX) (6–1)	Trinity (TX) (7–1)	Trinity (TX) (8–1)	Trinity (TX) (9–1)	Alma (12–1)	6.
7.	Linfield	Linfield (0–0)	Wisconsin–River Falls (2–0)	Wisconsin–River Falls (3–0)	Saint John's (MN) (2–1)	Saint John's (MN) (3–1)	Wisconsin–Whitewater (4–1)	Saint John's (MN) (5–1)	Wisconsin–River Falls (6–1)	Wisconsin–River Falls (7–1)	Johns Hopkins (9–0)	Johns Hopkins (10–0)	Randolph–Macon (13–1)	7.
8.	Hardin–Simmons	Wisconsin–Whitewater (1–0)	Linfield (1–0)	Saint John's (MN) (1–1)	Linfield (2–0)	Linfield (3–0)	Saint John's (MN) (4–1)	Wisconsin–River Falls (5–1)	Johns Hopkins (7–0)	Johns Hopkins (8–0)	Linfield (8–0)	Randolph–Macon (10–0)	Johns Hopkins (12–1)	8.
9.	Ithaca	Wisconsin–River Falls (1–0)	Saint John's (MN) (1–1)	Linfield (2–0)	Johns Hopkins (3–0)	Johns Hopkins (4–0)	Linfield (4–0)	Linfield (5–0)	Linfield (6–0)	Linfield (7–0)	Randolph–Macon (9–0)	Susquehanna (10–0)	Mount Union (11–1)	9.
10.	Delaware Valley	Cortland (1–0)	Cortland (2–0)	Wheaton (IL) (2–0)	Wheaton (IL) (3–0)	Randolph–Macon (4–0)	Johns Hopkins (5–0)	Johns Hopkins (6–0)	Randolph–Macon (7–0)	Randolph–Macon (8–0)	Susquehanna (9–0)	Wheaton (IL) (9–1)	Grove City (11–1)	10.
11.	Wisconsin–Whitewater	Wisconsin–La Crosse (1–0)	Wheaton (IL) (1–0)	Randolph–Macon (3–0)	Randolph–Macon (3–0)	Susquehanna (5–0)	Randolph–Macon (5–0)	Randolph–Macon (6–0)	Susquehanna (8–0)	Susquehanna (9–0)	Wisconsin–River Falls (7–2)	Cortland (8–1)	Trinity (TX) (10–2)	11.
12.	Wisconsin–La Crosse	Mary Hardin–Baylor (0–1)	Randolph–Macon (2–0)	Johns Hopkins (3–0)	Susquehanna (4–0)	John Carroll (3–1)	Susquehanna (6–0)	Susquehanna (7–0)	Wheaton (IL) (6–1)	Wheaton (IL) (7–1)	Wheaton (IL) (8–1)	Aurora (10–0)	Wheaton (IL) (10–2)	12.
13.	Wheaton (IL)	Wheaton (IL) (0–0)	Johns Hopkins (2–0)	Wisconsin–La Crosse (2–1)	Wisconsin–La Crosse (2–1)	Wheaton (IL) (3–1)	Wheaton (IL) (4–1)	Wheaton (IL) (5–1)	John Carroll (6–1)	John Carroll (7–1)	Aurora (9–0)	Alma (10–0)	Aurora (11–1)	13.
14.	Bethel (MN)	Johns Hopkins (1–0)	Wisconsin–La Crosse (1–1)	Carnegie Mellon (3–0)	John Carroll (2–1)	Wisconsin–La Crosse (3–1)	John Carroll (4–1)	John Carroll (5–1)	Aurora (7–0)	Aurora (8–0)	Ithaca (8–1)	Endicott (9–1)	Susquehanna (10–1)	14.
15.	Randolph–Macon	Randolph–Macon (1–0)	Carnegie Mellon (2–0)	Susquehanna (3–0)	Aurora (3–0)	Aurora (4–0)	Ithaca (4–1)	Aurora (6–0)	Ithaca (6–1)	Ithaca (7–1)	Cortland (8–1)	Hardin–Simmons (9–1)	Endicott (9–2)	15.
16.	Carnegie Mellon	Bethel (MN) (0–0)	Aurora (2–0)	Aurora (3–0)	Cortland (2–1)	Ithaca (3–1)	Aurora (5–0)	Ithaca (5–1)	Cortland (6–1)	Cortland (7–1)	Alma (9–0)	Saint John's (MN) (8–2)	Hardin–Simmons (9–2)	16.
17.	Cortland	Carnegie Mellon (1–0)	John Carroll (0–1)	John Carroll (1–1)	Ithaca (2–1)	Cortland (3–1)	Cortland (4–1)	Cortland (5–1)	Alma (7–0)	Alma (8–0)	Endicott (8–1)	John Carroll (8–2)	Whitworth (10–1)	17.
18.	Johns Hopkins	Ithaca (0–1)	Bethel (MN) (0–1)	Cortland (2–1)	Hardin–Simmons (2–1)	Hardin–Simmons (3–1)	Endicott (4–1)	Alma (6–0)	Saint John's (MN) (5–2)	Endicott (7–1)	John Carroll (7–2)	Grove City (10–0)	Ithaca (9–3)	18.
19.	John Carroll	Wisconsin–Oshkosh (1–0)	Mary Hardin–Baylor (0–2)	Bethel (MN) (1–1)	Alma (4–0)	Alma (5–0)	Alma (5–0)	Endicott (5–1)	Endicott (6–1)	Saint John's (MN) (6–2)	Hardin–Simmons (8–1)	Ithaca (8–2)	Saint John's (MN) (8–2)	19.
20.	Aurora	Aurora (1–0)	Ithaca (1–1)	Alma (3–0)	Wisconsin–Oshkosh (2–1)	Endicott (4–1)	Hardin–Simmons (4–1)	Hardin–Simmons (5–1)	Hardin–Simmons (6–1)	Hardin–Simmons (7–1)	Saint John's (MN) (7–2)	Whitworth (9–0)	John Carroll (8–2)	20.
21.	Wisconsin–Oshkosh	John Carroll (0–1)	Alma (2–0)	Ithaca (2–1)	Endicott (3–1)	Muhlenberg (4–0)	Muhlenberg (5–0)	Muhlenberg (6–0)	Muhlenberg (7–0)	Grove City (9–0)	Grove City (9–0)	Linfield (8–1)	Union (NY) (10–2)	21.
22.	Susquehanna	Susquehanna (1–0)	Susquehanna (1–0)	Wisconsin–Oshkosh (2–1)	Mary Hardin–Baylor (1–3)	Mary Hardin–Baylor (1–3)	Mary Hardin–Baylor (2–3)	Grove City (7–0)	Grove City (8–0)	Muhlenberg (7–1)	Muhlenberg (8–1)	Muhlenberg (9–1)	Muhlenberg (10–1)	22.
23.	Wisconsin–River Falls	Alma (1–0)	Wisconsin–Oshkosh (1–1)	Mary Hardin–Baylor (0–3)	Muhlenberg (3–0)	Grove City (5–0)	Grove City (6–0)	Mary Hardin–Baylor (3–3)	Mary Hardin–Baylor (4–3)	Berry (7–1)	Berry (8–1)	Berry (9–1)	Berry (9–1)	23.
24.	Alma	Delaware Valley (0–1)	Delaware Valley (0–1)	Muhlenberg (3–0)	Carnegie Mellon (3–1)	Delaware Valley (3–1)	Berry (4–1)	Berry (5–1)	Berry (6–1)	Coe (7–1)	Delaware Valley (8–1)	Wisconsin–River Falls (7–3)	Wisconsin–River Falls (7–3)	24.
25.	Salisbury	Salisbury (1–0)	Muhlenberg (2–0)	Delaware Valley (2–1)	Delaware Valley (3–1)	Berry (3–1)	Delaware Valley (4–1)	Delaware Valley (5–1)	Delaware Valley (6–1)	Delaware Valley (7–1)	Coe (8–1)	Delaware Valley (9–1)	Carnegie Mellon (10–1)	25.
	Preseason Jul 31	Week 1 Sep 3	Week 2 Sep 10	Week 3 Sep 17	Week 4 Sep 24	Week 5 October 1	Week 6 October 8	Week 7 October 15	Week 8 October 22	Week 9 October 29	Week 10 November 5	Week 11 November 12	Final December 16	
		None	Dropped: No. 25 Salisbury (1–1)	None	Dropped: No. 19 Bethel (MN) (1–2)	Dropped: No. 20 Wisconsin–Oshkosh (2–2); No. 25 Carnegie Mellon (4–1)	None	None	None	Dropped: No. 23 Mary Hardin–Baylor (4–4)	None	Dropped: No. 25 Coe (9–1)	Dropped: No. 21 Linfield (8–1); No. 25 Delaware Valley (9–2)	

== AFCA Coaches Poll ==
	Week 3 September 18	Week 4 September 25	Week 5 October 2	Week 6 October 9	Week 7 October 16	Week 8 October 23	Week 9 October 30	Week 10 November 6	Week 11 November 13	Final December 18	
1.	North Central (IL) (2–0) (49)	North Central (IL) (3–0) (48)	North Central (IL) (4–0) (48)	North Central (IL) (5–0) (48)	North Central (IL) (6–0) (48)	North Central (IL) (7–0) (48)	North Central (IL) (8–0) (48)	North Central (IL) (9–0) (48)	North Central (IL) (10–0) (48)	Cortland (14–1) (49)	1.
2.	Mount Union (2–0)	Mount Union (3–0) (1)	Mount Union (4–0) (1)	Mount Union (5–0) (1)	Mount Union (6–0) (1)	Mount Union (7–0) (1)	Mount Union (8–0) (1)	Mount Union (9–0) (1)	Mount Union (10–0) (1)	North Central (IL) (14–1)	2.
3.	Wisconsin–Whitewater (3–0)	Wisconsin–Whitewater (3–0)	Wisconsin–Whitewater (4–0)	Wartburg (6–0)	Wartburg (7–0)	Wartburg (8–0)	Wartburg (9–0)	Wartburg (10–0)	Wartburg (10–0)	Wartburg (13–1)	3.
4.	Wartburg (3–0)	Wartburg (4–0)	Wartburg (5–0)	Wisconsin–River Falls (5–0)	Linfield (5–0)	Linfield (6–0)	Linfield (7–0)	Linfield (8–0)	Trinity (TX) (9–1)	Wisconsin–La Crosse (11–2)	4.
5.	Hardin–Simmons (2–0)	Wisconsin–River Falls (3–0)	Wisconsin–River Falls (4–0)	Linfield (4–0)	Trinity (TX) (5–1)	Trinity (TX) (6–1)	Trinity (TX) (7–1)	Trinity (TX) (8–1)	Wisconsin–Whitewater (9–1)	Wisconsin–Whitewater (11–2)	5.
6.	Wisconsin–River Falls (3–0)	Linfield (2–0)	Linfield (3–0)	Trinity (TX) (5–1)	Wisconsin–Whitewater (5–1)	Wisconsin–Whitewater (6–1)	Wisconsin–Whitewater (7–1)	Wisconsin–Whitewater (8–1)	Wisconsin–La Crosse (9–1)	Randolph–Macon (13–1)	6.
7.	Linfield (2–0)	Trinity (TX) (3–1)	Trinity (TX) (4–1)	Johns Hopkins (5–0)	Johns Hopkins (6–0)	Johns Hopkins (7–0)	Wisconsin–La Crosse (7–1)	Wisconsin–La Crosse (8–1)	Johns Hopkins (10–0)	Alma (12–1)	7.
8.	Wheaton (IL) (2–0)	Wheaton (IL) (3–0)	Johns Hopkins (4–0)	Saint John's (MN) (4–1)	Wisconsin–La Crosse (5–1)	Wisconsin–La Crosse (6–1)	Johns Hopkins (8–0)	Johns Hopkins (9–0)	Randolph–Macon (10–0)	Johns Hopkins (12–1)	8.
9.	Trinity (TX) (2–1)	Saint John's (MN) (2–1)	Saint John's (MN) (3–1)	Wisconsin–La Crosse (4–1)	Saint John's (MN) (5–1)	Randolph–Macon (7–0)	Randolph–Macon (8–0)	Randolph–Macon (9–0)	Aurora (10–0)	Mount Union (11–1)	9.
10.	Johns Hopkins (3–0)	Johns Hopkins (3–0)	Randolph–Macon (4–0)	Randolph–Macon (5–0)	Randolph–Macon (6–0)	Wisconsin–River Falls (6–1)	Wisconsin–River Falls (7–1)	Aurora (9–0)	Susquehanna (10–0)	Grove City (11–1)	10.
11.	Saint John's (MN) (1–1)	Randolph–Macon (3–0)	Aurora (4–0)	Wisconsin–Whitewater (4–1)	Wisconsin–River Falls (5–1)	Aurora (7–0)	Aurora (8–0)	Susquehanna (9–0)	Alma (10–0)	Trinity (TX) (10–2)	11.
12.	Randolph–Macon (3–0)	Aurora (3–0)	Susquehanna (5–0)	Aurora (5–0)	Aurora (6–0)	Susquehanna (8–0)	Susquehanna (9–0)	Wheaton (IL) (8–1)	Wheaton (IL) (9–1)	Aurora (11–1)	12.
13.	Carnegie Mellon (3–0)	Susquehanna (4–0)	Wheaton (IL) (3–1)	Susquehanna (6–0)	Susquehanna (7–0)	Wheaton (IL) (6–1)	Wheaton (IL) (7–1)	Alma (9–0)	Cortland (9–1)	Wheaton (IL) (10–2)	13.
14.	Aurora (3–0)	Wisconsin–La Crosse (2–1)	Wisconsin–La Crosse (3–1)	Wheaton (IL) (4–1)	Wheaton (IL) (5–1)	Alma (7–0)	Alma (8–0)	Ithaca (8–1)	Endicott (9–1)	Susquehanna (10–1)	14.
15.	Wisconsin–La Crosse (2–1)	Alma (4–0)	Alma (5–0)	Alma (5–0)	Alma (6–0)	John Carroll (6–1)	John Carroll (7–1)	Wisconsin–River Falls (7–2)	Hardin–Simmons (9–1)	Endicott (9–2)	15.
16.	Susquehanna (3–0)	John Carroll (2–1)	John Carroll (3–1)	John Carroll (4–1)	John Carroll (5–1)	Muhlenberg (7–0)	Ithaca (7–1)	Cortland (8–1)	Grove City (10–0)	Whitworth (10–1)	16.
17.	Alma (3–0)	Muhlenberg (3–0)	Muhlenberg (4–0)	Muhlenberg (5–0)	Muhlenberg (6–0)	Ithaca (6–1)	Cortland (7–1)	Endicott (8–1)	Muhlenberg (9–1)	Hardin–Simmons (9–2)	17.
18.	Bethel (MN) (1–1)	Ithaca (2–1)	Ithaca (3–1)	Ithaca (4–1)	Ithaca (5–1)	Cortland (6–1)	Endicott (7–1)	Hardin–Simmons (8–1)	Linfield (8–1) т	Ithaca (9–3)	18.
19.	John Carroll (1–1)	Hardin–Simmons (2–1)	Cortland (3–1)	Cortland (4–1)	Cortland (5–1)	Endicott (6–1)	Hardin–Simmons (7–1)	Grove City (9–0)	Whitworth (9–0) т	Muhlenberg (10–1)	19.
20.	Muhlenberg (3–0)	Cortland (2–1)	Hardin–Simmons (3–1)	Endicott (4–1)	Endicott (5–1)	Saint John's (MN) (5–2)	Grove City (9–0)	Saint John's (MN) (7–2)	Saint John's (MN) (8–2)	Union (NY) (10–2)	20.
21.	Cortland (2–1)	Wisconsin–Oshkosh (2–1)	Endicott (4–1)	Hardin–Simmons (4–1)	Hardin–Simmons (5–1)	Grove City (8–0)	Saint John's (MN) (6–2)	Muhlenberg (8–1)	DePauw (10–0)	DePauw (10–1)	21.
22.	Ithaca (2–1)	Endicott (3–1)	Utica (5–0)	DePauw (6–0)	Grove City (7–0)	Hardin–Simmons (6–1)	Muhlenberg (7–1)	DePauw (9–0)	Berry (9–1)	Saint John's (MN) (8–2)	22.
23.	Wisconsin–Oshkosh (2–1)	Utica (4–0)	DePauw (5–0)	Grove City (6–0)	DePauw (7–0)	DePauw (8–0)	DePauw (9–0)	John Carroll (7–2)	Ithaca (8–2)	Berry (9–1)	23.
24.	Utica (3–0)	Delaware Valley (3–0)	Delaware Valley (3–1)	Delaware Valley (4–1)	Delaware Valley (5–1)	Delaware Valley (6–1)	Delaware Valley (7–1)	Berry (8–1)	John Carroll (8–2)	Linfield (8–1)	24.
25.	Delaware Valley (2–1) т DePauw (3–0) т	DePauw (4–0)	Grove City (5–0)	Washington (MO) (5–0)	Mary Hardin–Baylor (3–3)	Mary Hardin–Baylor (4–3)	Berry (7–1)	Delaware Valley (8–1)	Delaware Valley (9–1)	John Carroll (8–2)	25.
	Week 3 September 18	Week 4 September 25	Week 5 October 2	Week 6 October 9	Week 7 October 16	Week 8 October 23	Week 9 October 30	Week 10 November 6	Week 11 November 13	Final December 18	
		Dropped: No. 13 Carnegie Mellon (3–1); No. 18 Bethel (MN) (1–2)	Dropped: No. 21 Wisconsin–Oshkosh (2–2)	Dropped: No. 22 Utica (5–1)	Dropped: No. 25 Washington (MO) (5–1)	None	Dropped: No. 25 Mary Hardin-Baylor (4–4)	None	Dropped: No. 15 Wisconsin-River Falls (7–3)	Dropped: No. 25 Delaware Valley (9–2)	
