= Chris Winter (American football) =

American football coach

Current position
- Title: Head coach
- Team: Wartburg
- Conference: ARC
- Record: 61–10

Biographical details
- Born: New Hampton, IA
- Education: Wartburg

Playing career

Football
- 2001–2004: Wartburg

Baseball
- 2001–2004: Wartburg
- Positions: Wide receiver (football); Third baseman (baseball)

Coaching career (HC unless noted)

Football
- 2004–2007: Wartburg (assistant)
- 2008–2010: Wartburg (S&C)
- 2011–2012: Wartburg (DC/S&C)
- 2013–2021: Wartburg (AHC/DC/S&C)
- 2021–present: Wartburg

Head coaching record
- Overall: 61–10
- Tournaments: 7–4 (NCAA D-III playoffs)

Accomplishments and honors

Championships
- 5x A-R-C (2022–2026)

Awards
- 5x A-R-C Coach of the Year (2022–2026); D3football.com National Coach of the Year (2022); AFCA Regional Coach of the Year (2023)

Chris Winter is an American college football coach. He is the head football coach for Wartburg College, a position he has held since 2021. In just his second year at the helm of the Wartburg Knights, he led them to a program record 13 wins and to the first NCAA Division III Semifinal appearance in school history.

== Playing career ==
He attended Wartburg College, where he played football and baseball, earning all-conference honors in both sports. He was named to the Wartburg College Athletics Hall of Fame in 2016.

== Coaching career ==
=== Wartburg ===
Winter was named the head football coach at Wartburg on July 1, 2021, becoming the 14th head coach in the programs history. He took over the program that he was an assistant in for 16 years. In just his second season with the Knights he took the program to new heights when they reached the NCAA semifinals and reached a program mark of 13 wins. The season ended when they lost a thriller to perennial NCAA Division III power Mount Union 34–31. Following the 2022 season, Chris Winter was named the D3football.com National football coach of the year. The 2023 season saw Winter lead his team back to the NCAA semifinals where they would drop another thriller to No. 1 North Central (IL) 34–27.

== Personal life ==
Winter was born in New Hampton, Iowa. Winter and his wife Tara reside in Waverly, IA and have two children. His wife Tara is also a graduate of Wartburg College where she is the head cheerleading coach and executive director of admissions.

== Head coaching record ==
Year	Team	Overall	Conference	Standing	Bowl/playoffs	AFCA^{#}	D3^{°}
Wartburg Knights (American Rivers Conference) (2021–present)
2021	Wartburg	7–3	6–2	2nd			
2022	Wartburg	13–1	8–0	1st	L NCAA Division III Semifinal	4	3
2023	Wartburg	13–1	8–0	1st	L NCAA Division III Semifinal	3	3
2024	Wartburg	10–2	8–0	1st	L NCAA Division III Third Round	12	13
2025	Wartburg	10–1	8–0	1st	L NCAA Division III Second Round	14	12
2026	Wartburg	8–2	7–0	1st		12	12
Wartburg:		61–10	45–2				
Total:		61–10					
National championship Conference title Conference division title or championship game berth
