= Randolph–Macon Yellow Jackets football =

Football program representing Randolph–Macon College

- First season: 1881; 145 years ago
- Head coach: Pedro Arruza; 22nd season, 147–71 (.674)
- Location: Ashland, Virginia
- Stadium: Day Field (capacity: 5,000)
- NCAA division: Division III
- Conference: ODAC
- Colors: Lemon and black
- Bowl record: 2–4 (.333)

National championships
- Claimed: 1 (Div. III): 1969
- Rivalries: Hampden–Sydney (rivalry)

The Randolph–Macon Yellow Jackets football team represents Randolph–Macon College in the sport of American football.

In 1968, Randolph-Macon posted a perfect 9-0 record, the first and only undefeated team in program history. They never trailed after the first 8 minutes and 7 seconds of the first game and outscored opponents 404-87 (an average of 35 points per game). They finished third in the nation in rushing, averaging 279.9 rushing yards per game. Halfback Howard Stevens (5’7” and 165 lbs) led the country with 1,468 rushing yards and 142 points, and later played five years in the NFL. They were inducted into Randolph-Macon’s Athletic Hall of Fame in 2020.

In 1969, Randolph–Macon defeated Bridgeport 47–28 in the inaugural Knute Rockne Bowl laying claim to a shared NCAA College Division national championship with Wittenberg (Springfield, Ohio) which had defeated William Jewell in the first Amos Alonzo Stagg Bowl. The four teams had been chosen by the NCAA to compete in the first ever playoffs established for College Division schools. No complete playoff was set up until the 1973 season. The 1969 football team was inducted into the college's Hall of Fame in 2004.

The Yellow Jackets football team is currently coached by Pedro Arruza and won ODAC championships in 2007, 2008, 2016, 2018, 2020, 2021, 2022, 2023, 2024 and 2025. Going into November 2013, the football team had posted a record seven seasons with a winning record. The football team plays its home games at Day Field.

== History ==
Randolph-Macon has a rich football history dating back to 1881. Randolph-Macon was also a founding member of the Eastern Virginia Intercollegiate Athletic Association (originally just the Virginia Intercollegiate Athletic Association) in 1900, and remained full member of the association until the organization's demise in 1921.

On November 24, 2020, the 1984 football victory over Hampden–Sydney was voted the greatest football game in the history of Randolph–Macon dating back to 1891. In this game, Randolph–Macon’s defense forced five turnovers which allowed the explosive and record breaking offense to score 31 points in a 31–10 victory. This win allowed Randolph–Macon to advance to the NCAA Division III playoffs for the first time in the school’s history, finishing the regular season ranked No. 5 in the nation and No. 1 in the NCAA South Region. During the historic 1984 season, Randolph–Macon wide receiver Keith Gilliam broke the all time NCAA record by having nine consecutive receptions for touchdowns.

== Postseason appearances ==
=== NCAA Division III playoffs ===
The Yellow Jackets have made eight appearances in the NCAA Division III playoffs, with a combined record of 6–8.

Year	Round	Opponent	Result
1969	East Regional championship	Bridgeport	W, 47–28
1984	First Round	Washington & Jefferson	L, 21–22
2008	First Round	Mount Union	L, 0–56
2016	First Round	Johns Hopkins	L, 21–42
2018	First Round; Second Round	John Carroll; Muhlenberg	W, 23–20; L, 6–35
2022	First Round; Second Round	Cortland; Delaware Valley	W, 35–28; L, 32–39
2023	First Round; Second Round; Quarterfinals; Semifinals	Christopher Newport; Ithaca; Johns Hopkins; Cortland	W, 28–20; W, 46–0; W, 39–36; L, 14–49
2024	Second Round; Third Round	Washington & Jefferson; Salisbury	W, 38–22; L, 14–35
2025	Second Round	John Carroll	L, 6–35
