= Day Field =

Stadium in Ashland, Virginia

Coordinates: 37.763947°N 77.477796°W

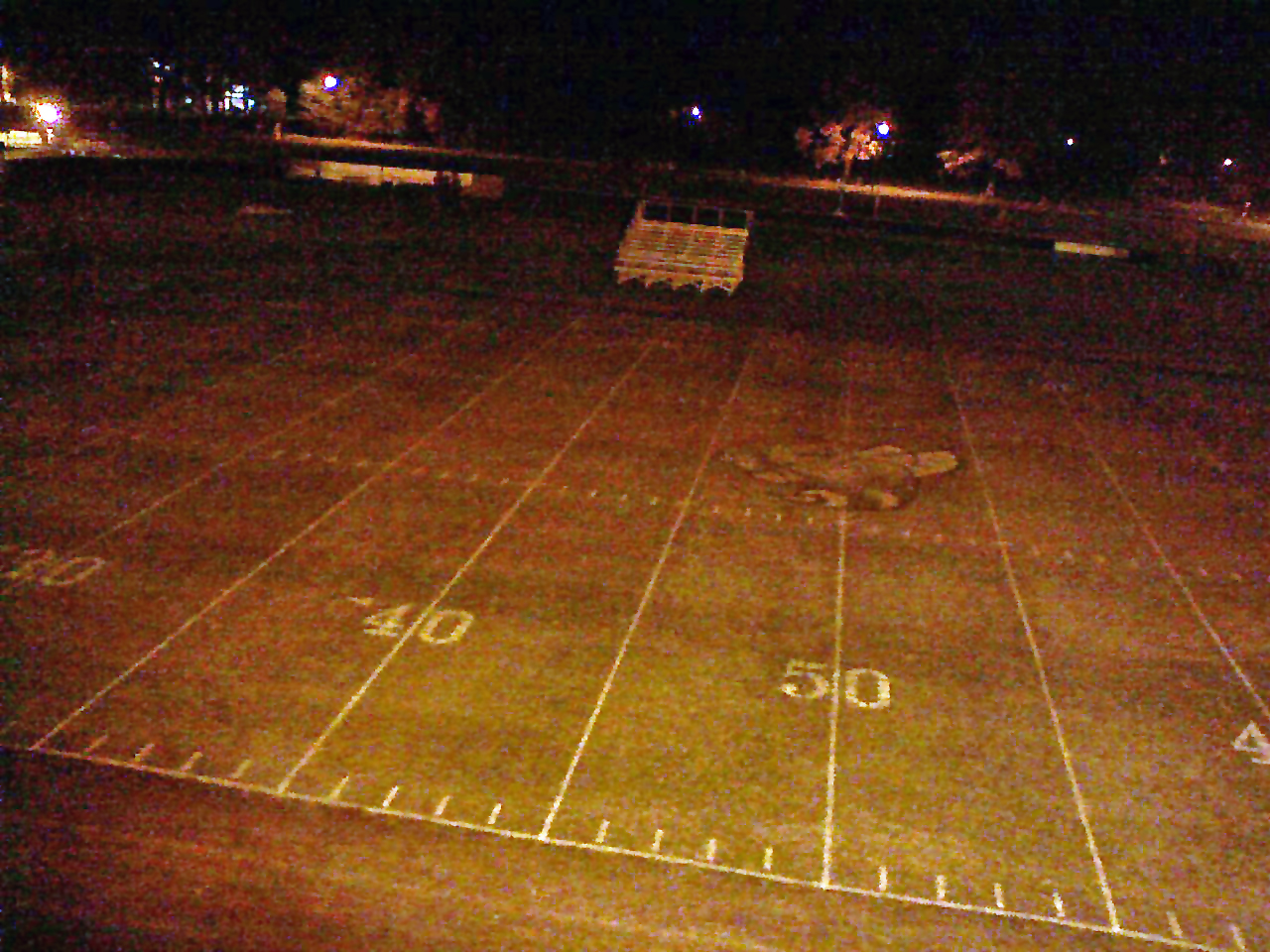
- Day Field in 2007
- Interactive map of Day Field
- Location: Ashland, Virginia
- Owner: Randolph-Macon College
- Capacity: 5,000
- Surface: Natural Grass

Tenants
- Randolph-Macon Yellow Jackets (Football & Lacrosse)

Day Field is a 5,000-capacity stadium in Ashland, Virginia on the campus of Randolph-Macon College where it serves as home to the school's football program as well as both the men's and women's lacrosse teams.

The stadium is named for benefactor Frank L. Day who donated the land it sits on in 1937.
