= 2023 NCAA Division III football season =

American college football season

- Total No. of teams: 240
- Preseason AP No. 1: North Central (IL)
- Regular season: September 2 – November 12, 2023
- Playoffs: November 19 – December 15, 2023
- National championship: Salem Football Stadium; Salem, VA; December 15, 2023
- Champion: Cortland
- Gagliardi Trophy: Luke Lehnen, QB, North Central (IL)

The 2023 NCAA Division III football season was the component of the 2023 college football season organized by the NCAA at the Division III level in the United States. The regular season began on September 2 and ended on November 12. This was the 50th season that the NCAA has sponsored a Division III championship.

North Central (IL) were the defending national champions.

The season's playoffs was played between November 19 and December 15, culminating in the national championship—also known as the Stagg Bowl—at the Salem Football Stadium in Salem, Virginia.

== Conference changes and new programs ==
=== Membership changes ===
Team	Former conference	New conference	Source
Catholic	NEWMAC	Landmark	
Eastern	Independent	MAC	
Finlandia	UMAC	University closed	
Juniata	Centennial	Landmark	
Keystone	ECFC	Landmark	
Lycoming	MAC	Landmark	
Lyon	Sooner (NAIA)	Independent	
Moravian	Centennial	Landmark	
Salve Regina	CCC	NEWMAC	
Southwestern	ASC	SAA	
SUNY Maritime	ECFC	NEWMAC	
Susquehanna	Centennial	Landmark	
Whittier	SCIAC	Program dropped	
Wilkes	MAC	Landmark	

== Other headlines ==
- September 23 – Shenandoah's Haley Van Voorhis became the first woman to play a non-kicking position in NCAA football, coming on as a safety in the first quarter of the Hornets' game against Juniata.
- October 4 – Anna Maria College announced it was leaving the Eastern Collegiate Football Conference and joining the Massachusetts State Collegiate Athletic Conference for the 2025–26 academic year.
- October 10 – Dean College announced it was leaving the Eastern Collegiate Football Conference and joining the Massachusetts State Collegiate Athletic Conference for the 2025–26 academic year.

== Conference standings ==
2023 American Rivers Conference football standings
	Conf.			Overall
Team	W		L	W		L
No. 3 Wartburg $^	8	–	0	13	–	1
Coe ^	7	–	1	9	–	2
Central (IA)	6	–	2	8	–	2
Dubuque	5	–	3	5	–	5
Loras	4	–	4	5	–	5
Nebraska Wesleyan	2	–	6	4	–	6
Simpson (IA)	2	–	6	3	–	7
Buena Vista	2	–	6	2	–	8
Luther	0	–	8	0	–	10
$ – Conference champion; ^ – NCAA Division III playoff participant; Rankings from D3Football.com

2023 American Southwest Conference football standings
	Conf.			Overall
Team	W		L	W		L
No. 16 Hardin–Simmons $^	6	–	0	9	–	2
Mary Hardin–Baylor	5	–	1	6	–	4
Howard Payne	3	–	3	6	–	4
McMurry	3	–	3	6	–	4
East Texas Baptist	3	–	3	5	–	5
Texas Lutheran	1	–	5	2	–	8
Austin	0	–	6	1	–	9
Sul Ross*	0	–	0	4	–	6
$ – Conference champion; ^ – NCAA Division III playoff participant; * Note: Sul Ross ineligible for D3 postseason play and conference games due to start of transition to D2.; Rankings from D3Football.com

2023 Centennial Conference football standings
	Conf.			Overall
Team	W		L	W		L
No. 8 Johns Hopkins $^	6	–	0	12	–	1
No. 22 Muhlenberg	5	–	1	10	–	1
Franklin & Marshall	3	–	3	8	–	3
Ursinus	3	–	3	8	–	3
Dickinson	3	–	3	6	–	4
Gettysburg	1	–	5	2	–	8
McDaniel	0	–	6	0	–	10
$ – Conference champion; ^ – NCAA Division III playoff participant; Rankings from D3Football.com

2023 College Conference of Illinois and Wisconsin football standings
	Conf.			Overall
Team	W		L	W		L
No. 2 North Central (IL) $^	9	–	0	14	–	1
No. 12 Wheaton (IL) ^	8	–	1	10	–	2
Augustana (IL)	7	–	2	8	–	3
Washington University	6	–	3	7	–	3
Carroll (WI)	4	–	5	5	–	5
North Park	4	–	5	5	–	5
Carthage	3	–	6	3	–	7
Elmhurst	2	–	7	3	–	7
Illinois Wesleyan	2	–	7	2	–	8
Millikin	0	–	9	0	–	10
$ – Conference champion; ^ – NCAA Division III playoff participant; Rankings from D3Football.com

2023 Commonwealth Coast Conference football standings
	Conf.			Overall
Team	W		L	W		L
No. 15 Endicott $^	5	–	0	9	–	2
Western New England	4	–	1	8	–	3
Husson	3	–	2	7	–	3
New England (ME)	2	–	3	6	–	4
Curry	1	–	4	3	–	7
Nichols	0	–	5	3	–	7
$ – Conference champion; ^ – NCAA Division III playoff participant; Rankings from D3Football.com

2023 Eastern Collegiate Football Conference standings
	Conf.			Overall
Team	W		L	W		L
Alfred State +^	3	–	1	6	–	5
Anna Maria +	3	–	1	5	–	5
Gallaudet +	3	–	1	4	–	5
Dean	1	–	3	2	–	8
Castleton	0	–	4	2	–	7
+ – Conference co-champions; ^ – NCAA Division III playoff participant

2023 Empire 8 Athletic Conference football standings
	Conf.			Overall
Team	W		L	W		L
No. 1 Cortland $^	6	–	0	14	–	1
Brockport	5	–	1	8	–	2
Utica	4	–	2	9	–	2
St. John Fisher	2	–	4	5	–	5
Alfred	2	–	4	4	–	6
Morrisville	2	–	4	4	–	6
Hartwick	0	–	6	1	–	9
$ – Conference champion; ^ – NCAA Division III playoff participant; Rankings from D3Football.com

2023 Heartland Collegiate Athletic Conference football standings
	Conf.			Overall
Team	W		L	W		L
Mount St. Joseph $^	7	–	0	9	–	2
Rose–Hulman	6	–	1	7	–	3
Hanover	4	–	3	7	–	3
Franklin (IN)	4	–	3	4	–	6
Bluffton	3	–	4	4	–	6
Defiance	3	–	4	4	–	6
Manchester	1	–	6	1	–	9
Anderson (IN)	0	–	7	0	–	10
$ – Conference champion; ^ – NCAA Division III playoff participant

2023 Landmark Conference football standings
	Conf.			Overall
Team	W		L	W		L
No. 14 Susquehanna $^	6	–	0	10	–	1
Lycoming	4	–	2	5	–	6
Wilkes	4	–	2	5	–	6
Catholic University	3	–	3	5	–	5
Moravian	3	–	3	4	–	6
Keystone	1	–	5	2	–	8
Juniata	0	–	6	1	–	9
$ – Conference champion; ^ – NCAA Division III playoff participant; Rankings from D3Football.com

2023 Liberty League football standings
	Conf.			Overall
Team	W		L	W		L
No. 18 Ithaca $^	6	–	0	9	–	3
No. 21 Union (NY) ^	5	–	1	10	–	2
Hobart	4	–	2	8	–	3
RPI	3	–	3	8	–	3
Rochester (NY)	2	–	4	5	–	5
St. Lawrence	1	–	5	3	–	7
Buffalo State	0	–	6	2	–	8
$ – Conference champion; ^ – NCAA Division III playoff participant; Rankings from D3Football.com

2023 Massachusetts State Collegiate Athletic Conference football standings
	Conf.			Overall
Team	W		L	W		L
UMass Dartmouth +	7	–	1	9	–	2
Bridgewater State +	7	–	1	7	–	3
Western Connecticut +^	7	–	1	7	–	3
Framingham State	5	–	3	5	–	4
Plymouth State	4	–	4	4	–	6
Westfield State	3	–	5	3	–	7
Massachusetts Maritime	2	–	6	2	–	8
Worcester State	1	–	7	1	–	9
Fitchburg State	0	–	8	0	–	10
+ – Conference co-champions; ^ – NCAA Division III playoff participant

2023 Michigan Intercollegiate Athletic Association football standings
	Conf.			Overall
Team	W		L	W		L
No. 6 Alma $^	6	–	0	12	–	1
Hope	5	–	1	8	–	2
Trine	4	–	2	6	–	4
Albion	3	–	3	7	–	3
Olivet	2	–	4	4	–	6
Kalamazoo	1	–	5	5	–	5
Adrian	0	–	6	1	–	9
$ – Conference champion; ^ – NCAA Division III playoff participant; Rankings from D3Football.com

2023 Middle Atlantic Conference football standings
	Conf.			Overall
Team	W		L	W		L
Delaware Valley $^	9	–	0	9	–	2
King's (PA)	7	–	2	8	–	3
Stevenson	6	–	3	7	–	4
Widener	6	–	3	7	–	4
Lebanon Valley	6	–	3	6	–	5
FDU–Florham	4	–	5	5	–	5
Misericordia	4	–	5	4	–	6
Eastern	2	–	7	2	–	8
Alvernia	1	–	8	1	–	9
Albright	0	–	9	0	–	10
$ – Conference champion; ^ – NCAA Division III playoff participant

2023 Midwest Conference football standings
	Conf.			Overall
Team	W		L	W		L
Illinois College +^	8	–	1	9	–	2
Monmouth (IL) +	8	–	1	9	–	2
Lake Forest	6	–	3	7	–	3
Cornell (IA)	6	–	3	6	–	4
Chicago	6	–	3	6	–	4
Ripon	5	–	4	5	–	5
Knox	3	–	6	3	–	7
Grinnell	2	–	7	2	–	8
Beloit	1	–	8	2	–	8
Lawrence	0	–	9	0	–	10
+ – Conference co-champions; ^ – NCAA Division III playoff participant; Rankings from D3Football.com

2023 Minnesota Intercollegiate Athletic Conference football standings
	Div			Conf.			Overall
Team	W		L	W		L	W		L
Northwoods Division
Gustavus Adolphus xy	4	–	0	5	–	3	6	–	4
No. 19 Saint John's (MN)	3	–	1	7	–	1	8	–	2
Carleton	2	–	2	5	–	3	7	–	3
St. Olaf	1	–	3	4	–	4	5	–	5
St. Scholastica	0	–	4	1	–	7	2	–	8
Skyline Division
Bethel (MN) xy$^	4	–	0	7	–	1	8	–	3
Concordia–Moorhead	3	–	1	4	–	4	5	–	5
Augsburg	2	–	2	4	–	4	6	–	4
Hamline	1	–	3	2	–	6	4	–	6
Macalester	0	–	4	1	–	7	3	–	7
Championship: Bethel (MN) 31, Gustavus Adolphus 7
$ – Conference champion; x – Division champion/co-champions; y – Championship game participant; ^ – NCAA Division III playoff participant; Rankings from D3Football.com

2023 New England Small College Athletic Conference football standings
	Conf.			Overall
Team	W		L	W		L
Middlebury +	8	–	1	8	–	1
Trinity (CT) +	8	–	1	8	–	1
Tufts	6	–	3	6	–	3
Wesleyan	6	–	3	6	–	3
Amherst	4	–	5	4	–	5
Bowdoin	4	–	5	4	–	5
Colby	3	–	6	3	–	6
Hamilton	3	–	6	3	–	6
Williams	3	–	6	3	–	6
Bates	0	–	9	0	–	9
+ – Conference co-champions

2023 New England Women's and Men's Athletic Conference football standings
	Conf.			Overall
Team	W		L	W		L
Springfield $^	7	–	0	9	–	2
Salve Regina	6	–	1	9	–	2
Merchant Marine	5	–	2	7	–	3
Coast Guard	3	–	4	5	–	5
Maritime	3	–	4	5	–	5
MIT	3	–	4	4	–	5
WPI	1	–	6	3	–	7
Norwich	0	–	7	1	–	9
$ – Conference champion; ^ – NCAA Division III playoff participant

2023 New Jersey Athletic Conference football standings
	Conf.			Overall
Team	W		L	W		L
Christopher Newport $^	5	–	1	7	–	4
Salisbury	4	–	2	6	–	4
Rowan	4	–	2	5	–	5
Montclair State	4	–	2	5	–	5
TCNJ	3	–	3	5	–	5
William Paterson	1	–	5	2	–	8
Kean	0	–	6	0	–	10
$ – Conference champion; ^ – NCAA Division III playoff participant

2023 North Coast Athletic Conference football standings
	Conf.			Overall
Team	W		L	W		L
DePauw $^	8	–	0	10	–	1
Denison	6	–	2	7	–	3
Wabash	6	–	2	7	–	3
Wittenberg	6	–	2	7	–	3
Ohio Wesleyan	4	–	4	5	–	5
Wooster	3	–	5	4	–	6
Kenyon	2	–	6	2	–	8
Hiram	1	–	7	1	–	9
Oberlin	0	–	8	1	–	9
$ – Conference champion; ^ – NCAA Division III playoff participant

2023 Northern Athletics Collegiate Conference football standings
	Conf.			Overall
Team	W		L	W		L
No. 13 Aurora $^	8	–	0	11	–	1
St. Norbert	6	–	2	7	–	4
Concordia (WI)	6	–	2	7	–	3
Benedictine (IL)	5	–	3	5	–	4
Wisconsin Lutheran	4	–	4	4	–	6
Lakeland	3	–	5	4	–	6
Eureka	2	–	6	4	–	6
Rockford	1	–	7	2	–	8
Concordia (IL)	1	–	7	1	–	9
$ – Conference champion; ^ – NCAA Division III playoff participant; Rankings from D3Football.com

2023 Northwest Conference football standings
	Conf.			Overall
Team	W		L	W		L
No. 17 Whitworth $^	7	–	0	10	–	1
Linfield	6	–	1	8	–	1
Lewis & Clark	4	–	3	5	–	5
Pacific Lutheran	4	–	3	5	–	5
George Fox	3	–	4	4	–	6
Puget Sound	2	–	5	3	–	6
Pacific (OR)	2	–	5	2	–	7
Willamette	0	–	7	1	–	9
$ – Conference champion; ^ – NCAA Division III playoff participant; Rankings from D3Football.com

2023 Ohio Athletic Conference football standings
	Conf.			Overall
Team	W		L	W		L
No. 9 Mount Union $^	9	–	0	11	–	1
No. 20 John Carroll	8	–	1	8	–	2
Marietta	7	–	2	8	–	2
Baldwin Wallace	6	–	3	6	–	4
Heidelberg	5	–	4	6	–	4
Ohio Northern	4	–	5	4	–	6
Muskingum	3	–	6	4	–	6
Wilmington (OH)	2	–	7	3	–	7
Capital	1	–	8	1	–	9
Otterbein	0	–	9	0	–	10
$ – Conference champion; ^ – NCAA Division III playoff participant; Rankings from D3Football.com

2023 Old Dominion Athletic Conference football standings
	Conf.			Overall
Team	W		L	W		L
No. 7 Randolph–Macon $^	7	–	0	13	–	1
Washington & Lee	6	–	1	8	–	3
Bridgewater	5	–	2	7	–	4
Hampden–Sydney	4	–	3	6	–	4
Shenandoah	3	–	4	5	–	5
Averett	2	–	5	5	–	5
Ferrum	1	–	6	3	–	7
Guilford	0	–	7	2	–	8
$ – Conference champion; ^ – NCAA Division III playoff participant; Rankings from D3Football.com

2023 Presidents' Athletic Conference football standings
	Conf.			Overall
Team	W		L	W		L
No. 10 Grove City $^	10	–	0	11	–	1
No. 25 Carnegie Mellon	9	–	1	10	–	1
Washington & Jefferson	8	–	2	9	–	2
Case Western Reserve	7	–	3	7	–	3
Westminster (PA)	6	–	4	6	–	4
Geneva	4	–	6	4	–	6
Allegheny	3	–	7	3	–	7
Saint Vincent	3	–	7	3	–	7
Thiel	3	–	7	3	–	7
Waynesburg	2	–	8	2	–	8
Bethany (WV)	0	–	10	0	–	10
$ – Conference champion; ^ – NCAA Division III playoff participant; Rankings from D3Football.com

2023 Southern Athletic Association football standings
	Conf.			Overall
Team	W		L	W		L
No. 11 Trinity (TX) $^	8	–	0	10	–	2
No. 23 Berry	7	–	1	9	–	1
Centre	6	–	2	6	–	4
Rhodes	4	–	4	6	–	4
Hendrix	3	–	5	3	–	7
Southwestern (TX)	3	–	5	3	–	7
Birmingham–Southern	2	–	6	3	–	7
Sewanee	2	–	6	3	–	7
Millsaps	1	–	7	1	–	9
$ – Conference champion; ^ – NCAA Division III playoff participant; Rankings from D3Football.com

2023 Southern California Intercollegiate Athletic Conference football standings
	Conf.			Overall
Team	W		L	W		L
Sun Division
Pomona-Pitzer xy	5	–	3	6	–	4
Redlands	4	–	4	5	–	5
La Verne	1	–	7	2	–	8
Surf Division
Chapman xy$^	6	–	2	6	–	3
Claremont-Mudd-Scripps x	6	–	2	8	–	2
Cal Lutheran	2	–	6	3	–	7
Championship: Chapman 41, Pomona-Pitzer 20
$ – Conference champion; x – Division champion/co-champions; y – Championship game participant; ^ – NCAA Division III playoff participant

2023 Upper Midwest Athletic Conference football standings
	Conf.			Overall
Team	W		L	W		L
Minnesota Morris $^	5	–	0	7	–	4
Northwestern (MN)	4	–	1	6	–	4
Greenville	2	–	3	5	–	5
Martin Luther	2	–	3	2	–	8
Crown	1	–	4	1	–	8
Westminster (MO)	1	–	4	1	–	8
$ – Conference champion; ^ – NCAA Division III playoff participant; Rankings from D3Football.com

2023 USA South Athletic Conference football standings
	Conf.			Overall
Team	W		L	W		L
Belhaven $^	7	–	1	9	–	2
Huntingdon	6	–	1	8	–	2
Maryville (TN)	5	–	2	8	–	2
Brevard	5	–	2	5	–	5
North Carolina Wesleyan	4	–	3	4	–	6
Methodist	2	–	5	2	–	8
Greensboro	2	–	5	2	–	8
Southern Virginia	1	–	6	1	–	9
LaGrange	0	–	7	0	–	9
$ – Conference champion; ^ – NCAA Division III playoff participant

2023 Wisconsin Intercollegiate Athletic Conference football standings
	Conf.			Overall
Team	W		L	W		L
No. 4 Wisconsin–La Crosse $^	7	–	0	11	–	2
No. 5 Wisconsin–Whitewater ^	6	–	1	11	–	2
Wisconsin–Platteville	4	–	3	7	–	4
No. 24 Wisconsin–River Falls	4	–	3	7	–	3
Wisconsin–Oshkosh	4	–	3	6	–	4
Wisconsin–Stout	2	–	5	4	–	6
Wisconsin–Eau Claire	1	–	6	2	–	8
Wisconsin–Stevens Point	0	–	7	1	–	9
$ – Conference champion; + – Conference co-champions; ^ – NCAA Division III playoff participant; Rankings from D3Football.com

2023 NCAA Division III independents football records
	Conf.			Overall
Team	W		L	W		L
Lyon *		–		4	–	4
Hilbert		–		0	–	8
* – Lyon ineligible for postseason play due to transition from NAIA

== Postseason ==
=== Teams ===
==== Automatic bids (28) ====
Automatic bids
Conference	School	Record	Appearance	Last
American Rivers	Wartburg	10–0	16th	2022
American Southwest	Hardin–Simmons	9–1	12th	2022
Centennial	Johns Hopkins	10–0	12th	2021
CCIW	North Central (IL)	10–0	15th	2022
Commonwealth Coast	Endicott	9–1	5th	2022
ECFC	Alfred State	6–4	1st	—
Empire 8	Cortland	9–1	12th	2022
HCAC	Mount St. Joseph	9–1	7th	2022
Landmark	Susquehanna	10–0	5th	2022
Liberty	Ithaca	8–2	21st	2022
MASCAC	Western Connecticut	7–2	4th	2001
Michigan	Alma	10–0	5th	2022
Middle Atlantic	Delaware Valley	9–1	12th	2022
Midwest	Illinois College	9–1	2nd	2011
Minnesota	Bethel (MN)	8–2	12th	2022
NEWMAC	Springfield	9–1	9th	2022
New Jersey	Christopher Newport	7–3	11th	2014
North Coast	DePauw	10–0	5th	2022
NACC	Aurora	10–0	8th	2022
Northwest	Whitworth	9–0	5th	2018
Ohio	Mount Union	10–0	34th	2022
Old Dominion	Randolph–Macon	10–0	6th	2022
Presidents'	Grove City	10–0	1st	—
SAA	Trinity (TX)	9–1	15th	2022
SCIAC	Chapman	6–3	4th	2019
Upper Midwest	Minnesota Morris	7–3	6th	1981
USA South	Belhaven	9–1	1st	—
Wisconsin	Wisconsin–La Crosse	9–1	14th	2022

==== At-large bids (4) ====
At-large bids
School	Conference	Record	Appearance	Last
Wisconsin–Whitewater	WIAC	9–1	20th	2022
Union (NY)	Liberty	9–1	13th	2019
Wheaton (IL)	CCIW	9–1	14th	2022
Coe	ARC	9–1	10th	2016

=== Bracket ===
First round November 18; Campus sites
*	Wisconsin–La Crosse	62
Minnesota Morris	7
*	Aurora	20
Coe	7
*	Trinity (TX)	20
Hardin–Simmons	6
*	North Central (IL)	65
Belhaven	0
*	Wartburg	49
Illinois College	14
*	Whitworth	42
Chapman	28
*	Wheaton (IL)	41
Mount St. Joseph	34
*	Wisconsin–Whitewater	42
Bethel (MN)	14
*	Mount Union	56
Alfred State	14
*	Alma	32
DePauw	17
*	Endicott	17
Cortland	23
*	Susquehanna	20
Grove City	21
*	Johns Hopkins	62
Western Connecticut	20
*	Delaware Valley	16
Union (NY)	24
*	Springfield	7
Ithaca	21
*	Randolph–Macon	28
Christopher Newport	20

Second round November 25; Campus sites
*	Wisconsin–La Crosse	56
Aurora	35
Trinity (TX)	28
*	North Central (IL)	71
*	Wartburg	42
Whitworth	20
Wheaton (IL)	42
*	Wisconsin–Whitewater	49
*	Mount Union	20
Alma	24
*	Cortland	25
Grove City	24
*	Johns Hopkins	39
Union (NY)	17
Ithaca	0
*	Randolph–Macon	46

Quarterfinals; December 2 Campus sites
*	Wisconsin–La Crosse	42
North Central (IL)	55
*	Wartburg	31
Wisconsin–Whitewater	28
*	Alma	41
Cortland	58
*	Johns Hopkins	36
Randolph–Macon	39

Semifinals; December 9 Campus sites
North Central (IL)	34
*	Wartburg	27
Cortland	49
*	Randolph–Macon	14

Championship; 2023 Stagg Bowl; December 15; Salem, Virginia
North Central (IL)	37
Cortland	38

* - Host team

=== Bowl games ===
Division III had 13 bowl games, featuring teams that did not qualify for the Division III postseason tournament.

Date	Time (EST)	Game	Site	Television	Teams	Affiliations	Results
Nov. 18	11:00 a.m.	Centennial-MAC Bowl Series	Campus sites		Franklin & Marshall (7–3); King's (PA) (8–2)	Centennial; MAC	Franklin & Marshall 30; King's (PA) 7
Nov. 18	12:00 p.m.	Centennial-MAC Bowl Series	Campus sites		Muhlenberg (9–1); Lebanon Valley (6–4)	Centennial; MAC	Muhlenberg 23; Lebanon Valley 7
Nov. 18	12:00 p.m.	Whitelaw Bowl	Campus sites		RPI (7–3); Widener (7–3)	Liberty; MAC	RPI 49; Widener 21
Nov. 18	12:00 p.m.	Lynah Bowl	Campus sites		Washington & Jefferson (8–2); Merchant Marine (7–2)	PAC; NEWMAC	Washington & Jefferson 46; Merchant Marine 21
Nov. 18	12:00 p.m.	New England Bowl	Campus sites		Salve Regina (8–2); Anna Maria (5–4)	NEWMAC; ECFC	Salve Regina 37; Anna Maria 34
Nov. 18	12:00 p.m.	New England Bowl	Campus sites		Western New England (7–3); UMass Dartmouth (9–1)	CCC; MASCAC	Western New England 37; UMass Dartmouth 7
Nov. 18	12:00 p.m.	Cape Henry Bowl	Campus sites		Wilkes (4–6); Bridgewater (7–3)	Landmark; ODAC	Wilkes 35; Bridgewater 17
Nov. 18	12:00 p.m.	Cape Charles Bowl	Campus sites		Lycoming (4–6); Washington & Lee (8–2)	Landmark; ODAC	Lycoming 20; Washington & Lee 17
Nov. 18	12:00 p.m.	Lakefront Bowl	Raabe Stadium; Wauwatosa, Wisconsin		Monmouth (IL) (8–2); St. Norbert (7–3)	MWC; NACC	Monmouth (IL) 21; St. Norbert 14
Nov. 18	1:00 p.m.	Chapman Bowl	Campus sites		Utica (8–2); Hobart (8–2)	Empire 8 Liberty	Utica 10; Hobart 6
Nov. 18	2:00 p.m.	Centennial-MAC Bowl Series	Campus sites		Ursinus (7–3); Stevenson (7–3)	Centennial; MAC	Ursinus 31; Stevenson 13
Nov. 18	3:00 p.m.	Isthmus Bowl	Bank of Sun Prairie Stadium; Sun Prairie, Wisconsin		Wisconsin–Platteville (6–4); Augustana (IL) (8–2)	WIAC; CCIW	Wisconsin–Platteville 36; Augustana (IL) 10
Nov. 18	5:00 p.m.	Bushnell Bowl	Campus sites		Carnegie Mellon (9–1); Brockport (8–2)	PAC; Empire 8	Carnegie Mellon 37; Brockport 7

== Coaching changes ==
=== Preseason and in-season ===
This is restricted to coaching changes that took place on or after May 1, 2023, and will include any changes announced after a team's last regularly scheduled games but before its playoff games.

School	Outgoing coach	Date	Reason	Replacement	Previous position
Lebanon Valley	Joe Buehler	May 4, 2023	Retired	J. R. Drake	Lebanon Valley defensive coordinator (2018–2022)
McDaniel	Demarcus White	June 8, 2023	Resigned	David Sartin	McDaniel offensive line coach (2021–2022)
Willamette	Isaac Parker	September 8, 2023	Fired	Tim Rude	Willamette defensive coordinator and defensive backs coach (2022–2023)
Adrian	Jim Deere	October 17, 2023	Resigned	Harry Bailey	Adrian offensive coordinator and running backs coach (2016–2023)

=== End of season ===
This list includes coaching changes announced during the season that did not take effect until the end of the season.

School	Outgoing coach	Date	Reason	Replacement	Previous position
Concordia (IL)	Andy Lambert	N/A	N/A	Chase Hankins	Concordia (IL) offensive coordinator and quarterbacks coach (2022–2023)
Hampden–Sydney	Marty Favret	August 20, 2023 (effective at season's end)	Retired	Vince Luvara	Washington & Jefferson defensive coordinator (2016–2023)
Bethel (MN)	Steve Johnson	October 30, 2023 (effective at season's end)	Retired	Mike McElroy	Bethel (MN) defensive coordinator (2017–2023)
Westminster (MO)	John Welty	November 7, 2023 (effective at season's end)	Retired	Luke Butts	Lake Forest defensive coordinator and linebackers coach (2017–2023)
Nichols	Dale Olmsted	November 10, 2023 (effective at season's end)	Resigned	Vinny Marino	Nichols offensive coordinator (2022–2023)
Carthage	Dustin Hass	November 13, 2023	Resigned	Matt Popino	Endicott assistant head coach and defensive coordinator (2022–2023)
Ohio Northern	Dean Paul	November 13, 2023	Retired	Andy Fries	Rose–Hulman offensive coordinator and offensive line coach (2020–2023)
Dubuque	Stan Zweifel	November 14, 2023	Retired	Ryan Maiuri	Central (IA) assistant head coach, offensive coordinator and quarterbacks coach (2023)
Adrian	Harry Bailey (interim)	November 17, 2023	New coach hired	Joe Palka	Saline HS (MI) head coach (2012–2023)
Belhaven	Blaine McCorkle	November 28, 2023	Hired by Northwestern State	CJ Nightingale	Wheaton (IL) defensive coordinator and defensive backs coach (2020–2023)
Norwich	Mark Murnyack	November 30, 2023	Resigned	Bill Russell	Norwich associate head coach, special teams coordinator, and linebackers (2014–2023)
Union (NY)	Jon Poppe	December 2, 2023	Hired by Columbia	Jon Drach	Wilkes head coach (2018–2023)
Willamette	Tim Rude (interim)	December 11, 2023	New coach hired	Aric Williams	Montana Tech defensive coordinator (2022–2023)
Eureka	Kurt Barth	December 20, 2023	Resigned	Randy Starks	Loughborough defensive line coach (2023)
Wilkes	Jon Drach	December 29, 2023	Hired by Union (NY)	David Biever	Wilkes associate head coach and offensive line coach (2019–2023)
Wilmington	Corey Fillipovich	January 3, 2024	Resigned	Kevin Burke	Minnesota Morris associate head coach and offensive coordinator (2020–2023)
Johns Hopkins	Greg Chimera	January 4, 2024	Hired by Penn	Dan Wodicka	Johns Hopkins defensive coordinator and linebackers coach (2022–2023)
Ferrum	Cleive Adams	Before January 9, 2024	Became school's athletic director	Kevin Sherman	Buffalo wide receivers coach (2022–2023)
Delaware Valley	Duke Greco	January 10, 2024	Hired by West Chester	Mike Isgro	Delaware Valley special teams coordinator and running backs coach (2015–2023)
Millsaps	Cory York (interim)	January 24, 2024	Permanent replacement	Brandon Lechtenberg	Central Oklahoma defensive coordinator and linebackers coach (2022–2023)
Maritime	Mickey Rehring	February 9, 2024	Resigned	Jamel Ramsay	Nassau CC head coach (2017–2023)
Misericordia	John Davis	February 17, 2024	Resigned	Tyler Cottle (interim)	Misericordia defensive coordinator (2021–2023)
King's (PA)	Skyler Fultz	February 19, 2024	Resigned	Mike Cebrosky	King's (PA) associate head coach and defensive coordinator (2023)
McDaniel	David Sartin (interim)	February 22, 2024	Permanent replacement	Skyler Fultz	King's (PA) head coach (2023)
Fitchburg State	Zach Shaw	April 1, 2024	Resigned	Izzy Abraham	American International associate head coach, special teams coordinator, and running backs coach (2022–2023)
Rowan	Jay Accorsi	April 12, 2024	Retired	Pat Ruley	Susquehanna associate head coach, defensive coordinator, and inside linebackers coach (2023)

== See also ==
- 2023 NCAA Division I FBS football season
- 2023 NCAA Division I FCS football season
- 2023 NCAA Division II football season
- 2023 NAIA football season
- 2023 U Sports football season
- 2023 junior college football season
