= List of NCAA Division III football championship appearances by team =

The following is a list of current Division III schools that have participated in the playoffs leading to the NCAA Division III Football Championship.

The playoffs began with four teams in 1973, expanded to eight teams to 1975, 16 teams in 1985, 28 teams in 1999, 32 teams in 2005, and 40 teams in 2024.

== Current Division III members ==
=== Qualified programs ===
- Teams in **bold** participated in the 2026 postseason.
- Updated before 2026 playoffs on November 16, 2026.

Team	Appearances	First	Last	Wins	Losses	Total	Pct.
Adrian Bulldogs	4	1983	2014	0	4	4	.000
Albion Britons	12	1977	2021	5	11	16	.313
Albright Lions	5	1975	2015	4	5	9	.444
Alfred Saxons	4	1981	2016	4	4	8	.500
Alfred State Pioneers	2	2023	2024	0	2	2	.000
Allegheny Gators	8	1987	2003	5	7	12	.417
Alma Scots	6	1999	2025	3	6	9	.333
**Amherst Mammoths**	1	2026	2026	0	0	0	–
Anderson (IN) Ravens	1	1993	1993	0	1	1	.000
Augsburg Auggies	1	1997	1997	1	1	2	.500
Augustana (IL) Vikings	15	1976	2005	22	11	33	.667
Aurora Spartans	9	1992	2024	3	8	11	.273
**Baldwin Wallace Yellow Jackets**	7	1978	2026	4	5	9	.444
Belhaven Blazers	1	2023	2023	0	1	1	.000
**Benedictine (IL) Eagles**	4	2010	2026	0	3	3	.000
Berry Vikings	5	2017	2025	4	4	8	.500
Bethany (WV) Bison	1	1980	1980	0	1	1	.000
Bethel (MN) Royals	14	2000	2025	20	15	35	.571
**Bridgewater State Bears**	5	1999	2026	0	4	4	.000
Bridgewater (VA) Eagles	7	2000	2019	10	7	17	.588
Brockport Golden Eagles	7	2000	2019	7	7	14	.500
Buena Vista Beavers	2	1976	1986	1	2	3	.333
Buffalo State Bengals	7	1992	1999	2	7	9	.222
Cal Lutheran Kingsmen	4	2009	2012	0	4	4	.000
**Calvin Knights**	1	2026	2026	0	0	0	–
Capital (OH) Crusaders	4	1987	2007	4	4	8	.500
Carleton Knights	1	1992	1992	0	1	1	.000
Carnegie Mellon Tartans	9	1978	2024	4	7	11	.364
Carroll (WI) Pioneers	1	1976	1976	0	1	1	.000
Carthage Firebirds	1	2004	2004	2	1	3	.667
Case Western Spartans	5	2007	2019	2	5	7	.286
Catholic University Cardinals	3	1997	1999	0	3	3	.000
Central (IA) Dutch	22	1974	2021	24	21	45	.533
Centre Colonels	4	2011	2024	2	3	5	.400
Chapman Panthers	5	2014	2025	2	5	7	.286
**Christopher Newport Captains**	13	2001	2026	3	12	15	.200
**Claremont-Mudd-Scripps Stags**	2	2018	2026	0	1	1	.000
Coast Guard Bears	2	1996	1997	0	2	2	.000
Coe Kohawks	12	1985	2025	4	11	15	.267
Concordia Chicago Cougars	1	2012	2012	0	1	1	.000
Concordia–Moorhead Cobbers	6	1986	2005	4	6	10	.400
**Concordia Wisconsin Falcons**	6	2003	2026	0	5	5	.000
**Cortland Red Dragons**	15	1988	2026	13	13	26	.500
Crown Polars	1	2025	2025	0	1	1	.000
Curry Colonels	6	2003	2008	2	6	8	.250
Delaware Valley Aggies	12	2004	2023	14	12	26	.538
Denison Big Red	2	1985	2018	0	2	2	.000
**DePauw Tigers**	8	2009	2026	2	6	8	.250
**Dickinson Red Devils**	5	1989	2026	0	4	4	.000
Dubuque Spartans	4	1979	2015	0	4	4	.000
East Texas Baptist Tigers	1	2003	2003	1	1	2	.500
**Eastern Eagles**	2	2025	2026	1	1	2	.500
Elmhurst Bluejays	1	2012	2012	0	1	1	.000
**Endicott Gulls**	8	2010	2026	1	7	8	.125
Eureka Red Devils	2	2017	2018	0	2	2	.000
Framingham State Rams	7	2012	2025	0	7	7	.000
Franklin Grizzlies	9	2007	2017	5	9	14	.357
Franklin & Marshall Diplomats	1	2025	2025	0	1	1	.000
Gallaudet Bison	2	2013	2022	0	2	2	.000
Gettysburg Bullets	1	1985	1985	2	1	3	.667
Grove City Wolverines	3	2023	2025	1	2	3	.333
Gustavus Adolphus Gusties	1	1987	1987	0	1	1	.000
Greenville Panthers	1	2021	2021	0	1	1	.000
**Hampden–Sydney Tigers**	8	1977	2026	1	7	8	.125
**Hanover Panthers**	10	1995	2026	2	9	11	.182
**Hardin–Simmons Cowboys**	15	1999	2026	4	14	18	.222
Hartwick Hawks	1	2007	2007	0	1	1	.000
**Heidelberg Student Princes**	2	2012	2026	0	1	1	.000
Hendrix Warriors	1	2015	2015	0	1	1	.000
Hiram Terriers	1	1987	1987	0	1	1	.000
Hobart Statesmen	13	2000	2024	9	12	21	.429
**Hope Flying Dutchmen**	8	1986	2026	0	6	6	.000
**Huntingdon Hawks**	8	2009	2026	2	7	9	.222
Husson Eagles	4	2014	2018	1	4	5	.200
Illinois College Blueboys	2	2011	2023	0	2	2	.000
Illinois Wesleyan Titans	6	1992	2017	3	6	9	.333
Ithaca Bombers	21	1974	2023	31	18	49	.633
John Carroll Blue Streaks	9	1989	2025	13	9	22	.591
Johns Hopkins Blue Jays	14	2005	2025	18	14	32	.563
Juniata Eagles	1	1973	1973	1	1	2	.500
Kean Cougars	1	2011	2011	1	1	2	.500
King's (PA) Monarchs	2	2002	2024	1	1	2	.500
LaGrange Panthers	2	2008	2025	0	1	1	.000
Lake Forest Foresters	4	2002	2024	0	4	4	.000
Lakeland Muskies	5	2005	2017	0	5	5	.000
Lawrence Vikings	1	1981	1981	1	1	2	.500
La Verne Leopards	2	1994	2015	0	2	2	.000
Lebanon Valley Flying Dutchmen	1	2013	2013	0	1	1	.000
**Linfield Wildcats**	19	2000	2026	30	17	47	.638
Lycoming Warriors	12	1985	2008	13	12	25	.520
Macalester Scots	1	2014	2014	0	1	1	.000
Maine Maritime Mariners	1	2009	2009	0	1	1	.000
Maritime Privateers	2	2010	2019	0	2	2	.000
Martin Luther Knights	2	2018	2019	0	2	2	.000
**Mary Hardin–Baylor Crusaders**	20	2002	2026	42	17	59	.712
Maryville Scots	3	2013	2024	0	1	2	.000
MIT Engineers	3	2014	2019	1	3	4	.250
McDaniel Green Terror	5	1997	2001	2	5	7	.286
McMurry War Hawks	1	2011	2011	1	1	1	.500
**Merchant Marine Mariners**	2	1994	2026	0	1	1	.000
Millikin Big Blue	3	1989	2000	3	1	3	.250
Millsaps Majors	3	1975	2008	2	3	5	.400
Minnesota Morris Cougars	6	1977	2023	3	6	9	.333
**Monmouth (IL) Scots**	9	2005	2026	2	8	10	.200
Montclair State Red Hawks	10	2005	2011	9	10	19	.474
Moravian Greyhounds	2	1988	1993	1	2	3	.333
Mount Ida Mustangs	1	2012	2012	0	1	1	.000
Mount St. Joseph Lions	8	2004	2024	0	7	7	.000
Mount Union Purple Raiders	36	1985	2025	117	23	140	.836
Muhlenberg Mules	11	2002	2025	10	11	21	.476
TCNJ Lions	5	1990	2007	4	5	9	.444
North Carolina Wesleyan Bishops	2	2007	2009	1	2	3	.333
**North Central (IL) Cardinals**	18	2005	2026	39	14	53	.736
**Northwestern (MN) Eagles**	4	2016	2026	0	2	0	.000
Norwich Cadets	2	2011	2015	0	2	2	.000
Ohio Northern Polar Bears	4	1999	2015	5	4	9	.556
Olivet Comets	2	2007	2016	0	2	2	.000
Otterbein Cardinals	1	2008	2008	0	1	1	.000
Pacific Lutheran Lutes	6	1998	2013	8	5	13	.615
Plymouth State Panthers	5	1984	2017	1	5	6	.167
Pomona–Pitzer Sagehens	2	2022	2024	0	2	2	.000
Randolph–Macon Yellow Jackets	8	1984	2025	6	8	14	.429
Redlands Bulldogs	10	1990	2021	0	10	10	.000
**RPI Engineers**	8	1999	2026	7	7	14	.500
Rhodes Lynx	1	1988	1988	0	1	1	.000
Rochester Yellowjackets	1	1987	1987	0	1	1	.000
Rose–Hulman Fightin' Engineers	2	2016	2021	0	2	2	.000
Rowan Profs	16	1991	2014	31	16	47	.660
St. John Fisher Cardinals	5	2004	2013	10	5	15	.667
**Saint John's (MN) Johnnies**	31	1976	2026	45	28	73	.616
St. Lawrence Saints	4	1976	2010	2	4	6	.333
St. Norbert Green Knights	13	1989	2018	2	13	15	.133
St. Olaf Oles	1	1978	1978	0	1	1	.000
St. Scholastica Saints	5	2011	2015	0	5	5	.000
Salisbury Sea Gulls	15	1983	2025	13	15	28	.464
Shenandoah Hornets	1	2004	2004	0	1	1	.000
Simpson Storm	6	1988	2003	2	6	8	.250
**Springfield Pride**	12	1998	2026	7	11	18	.389
Stevenson Mustangs	1	2016	2016	0	1	1	.000
**Susquehanna River Hawks**	8	1986	2026	9	7	16	.563
**Texas Lutheran Bulldogs**	3	2014	2026	0	2	2	.000
Thiel Tomcats	1	2005	2005	1	1	2	.500
Trine Thunder	5	2008	2018	3	5	8	.375
**Trinity (CT) Bantams**	1	2026	2026	0	0	0	–
**Trinity (TX) Tigers**	18	1994	2026	15	17	32	.469
UMass Dartmouth Corsairs	3	2002	2024	0	2	2	.000
Union (NY) Garnet Chargers	14	1983	2025	11	14	25	.440
Ursinus Bears	3	1996	2024	1	3	4	.250
**Utica Pioneers**	2	2022	2026	1	1	2	.500
Wabash Little Giants	10	1977	2019	11	9	20	.550
**Wartburg Knights**	19	1982	2026	18	18	36	.500
**Washington–Saint Louis Bears**	4	1999	2026	0	3	3	.000
**Washington & Jefferson Presidents**	29	1984	2026	23	28	51	.451
Washington and Lee Generals	6	2006	2021	0	6	6	.000
Waynesburg Yellow Jackets	1	2003	2003	0	1	1	.000
**Wesleyan Cardinals**	1	2026	2026	0	0	0	–
Western Connecticut Wolves	4	1985	2023	1	4	5	.200
Western New England Golden Bears	6	2011	2019	1	6	7	.143
Westfield State Owls	1	2001	2001	0	1	1	.000
**Wheaton Thunder**	16	1995	2026	22	15	37	.595
Whitworth Pirates	7	2001	2025	3	4	7	.429
Widener Pride	14	1975	2014	19	12	31	.613
Wilkes Colonels	3	1993	2006	1	3	4	.250
Willamette Bearcats	3	1999	2008	1	3	4	.250
William Paterson Pioneers	1	1993	1993	1	1	2	.500
Wisconsin–Eau Claire Blugolds	2	1998	2007	3	2	5	.600
Wisconsin–La Crosse Eagles	16	1983	2025	21	14	35	.600
Wisconsin–Oshkosh Titans	5	2012	2019	12	5	17	.706
**Wisconsin–Platteville Pioneers**	5	2013	2026	2	4	6	.333
Wisconsin–River Falls Falcons	3	1995	2025	6	2	8	.750
Wisconsin–Stevens Point Pointers	4	1986	2008	1	4	5	.200
Wisconsin–Stout Blue Devils	1	2000	2000	0	1	1	.000
**Wisconsin–Whitewater Warhawks**	22	1988	2026	60	14	74	.811
Wittenberg Tigers	19	1973	2017	22	17	39	.564
Wooster Fighting Scots	1	2004	2004	1	1	2	.500
WPI Engineers	1	1992	1992	0	1	1	.000

=== Not yet qualified (Note: According to conferences in football, not necessarily a team's primary conference.) ===
- **American Rivers Conference** (2) – Loras, Nebraska Wesleyan
- **American Southwest Conference** (2) – Howard Payne, Schreiner
- **College Conference of Illinois and Wisconsin** (1) – North Park
- **Conference of New England** (3) – New England, New England College, Nichols
- **Empire 8** (1) – SUNY Morrisville
- **Heartland Collegiate Athletic Conference** (2) – Bluffton, Manchester
- **Independent** (1) – Keystone
- **Liberty League** (1) – Hilbert
- **Massachusetts State Collegiate Athletic Conference** (4) – Dean, Fitchburg State, Massachusetts Maritime, Worcester State
- **Michigan Intercollegiate Athletic Association** (1) – Kalamazoo
- **Middle Atlantic Conference** (3) – Alvernia, FDU Florham, Misericordia
- **Midwest Conference** (7) – Beloit, Chicago, Cornell (IA), Grinnell, Knox, Luther, Ripon
- **Minnesota Intercollegiate Athletic Conference** (1) – Hamline
- **New England Small College Athletic Conference** (Note: The NESCAC did not participate in the Division III football playoffs prior to the 2026 season.) (7) – Bates, Bowdoin, Colby, Hamilton, Middlebury, Tufts, Williams
- **New England Women's and Men's Athletic Conference** (1) – Salve Regina
- **New Jersey Athletic Conference** (1) – Castleton
- **North Coast Athletic Conference** (3) – Kenyon, Oberlin, Ohio Wesleyan
- **Northern Athletics Collegiate Conference** (2) – Rockford, Wisconsin Lutheran
- **Northwest Conference** (4) – George Fox, Lewis & Clark, Pacific (OR), Puget Sound
- **Ohio Athletic Conference** (3) – Marietta, Muskingum, Wilmington (OH)
- **Old Dominion Athletic Conference** (3) – Averett, Guilford, Roanoke
- **Presidents' Athletic Conference** (4) – Geneva, Saint Francis, St. Vincent, Westminster (PA)
- **Southern Athletic Association** (2) – Sewanee, Southwestern
- **Southern California Intercollegiate Athletic Conference** (2) – Azusa Pacific, Whittier
- **Southern Collegiate Athletic Conference** (3) – Austin, Centenary, Lyon
- **Upper Midwest Athletic Conference** (1) – Westminster (MO)
- **USA South Athletic Conference** (4) – Brevard, Greensboro, Methodist, Southern Virginia

== Former Division III members ==
Former NCAA Division III teams that sponsored football at D-III level and had made at least one appearance in playoffs but had either left NCAA Division III or no longer sponsor football.

Team	Appearances	First	Last	Wins	Losses	Total	Pct.
Albany Great Danes ^{[FCS]}	1	1977	1977	1	1	2	.500
Anna Maria Amcats ^{[Defunct]}	1	2021	2021	0	1	1	.000
Birmingham–Southern Panthers ^{[Defunct]}	1	2021	2021	1	1	2	.500
Bishop (TX) Tigers ^{[Defunct]}	1	1982	1982	1	1	2	.500
Bridgeport Purple Knights ^{[D2-NF]}	1	1973	1973	0	1	1	.000
Colorado College Tigers ^{[NF]}	1	1975	1975	0	1	1	.000
Dayton Flyers ^{[FCS]}	11	1978	1992	16	9	25	.640
Defiance Yellow Jackets ^{[NAIA]}	1	2001	2001	0	1	1	.000
Emory & Henry Wasps ^{[D2]}	5	1986	2000	3	5	8	.375
Evansville Purple Aces ^{[D1]}	1	1974	1974	0	1	1	.000
Ferrum Panthers ^{[D2]}	5	1987	2005	4	5	9	.444
Fordham Rams ^{[FCS]}	1	1987	1987	1	1	2	.500
Fort Valley State Wildcats ^{[D2]}	1	1975	1975	0	1	1	.000
Frostburg State Bobcats ^{[D2]}	3	1993	2018	4	3	7	.571
Hofstra Flying Dutchmen ^{[D1]}	6	1983	1990	2	6	8	.250
Indianapolis Greyhounds ^{[D2]}	1	1975	1975	0	1	1	.000
LIU Post Pioneers ^{[FCS]} (Note: After the 2018–19 school year, Long Island University merged the athletic programs of its two campuses—Division I LIU Brooklyn and Division II LIU Post—into a single Division I program under the LIU name. All varsity sports previously sponsored by either campus continued to be sponsored by the new LIU program, which inherited LIU Brooklyn's Division I and Northeast Conference memberships. The new nickname of Sharks was announced on May 15, 2019.)	1	1976	1976	0	1	1	.000
Louisiana College Wildcats ^{[NAIA]}	1	2012	2012	0	1	1	.000
MacMurray Highlanders ^{[Defunct]}	2	2001	2002	2	0	2	.000
UMass Lowell River Hawks ^{[D1]}	1	1991	1991	1	0	1	.000
Menlo Oaks ^{[D2-NF]}	1	1987	1987	1	0	1	.000
Millersville Marauders ^{[D2]}	1	1979	1979	0	1	1	.000
Mississippi College Choctaws ^{[D2-NF]}	1	2009	2009	0	1	1	.000
Occidental Tigers ^{[NF]}	7	1983	2008	3	7	10	.300
St. Thomas (MN) Tommies ^{[FCS]}	9	1990	2017	20	9	29	.690
San Diego Toreros ^{[FCS]}	1	1973	1973	0	1	1	.000
Slippery Rock ^{[D2]}	1	1974	1974	0	1	1	.000
Thomas More Saints ^{[D2]}	8	1992	2016	4	8	12	.333
Towson State Tigers ^{[FCS]}	1	1976	1976	2	1	1	.667
Wagner Seahawks ^{[FCS]}	4	1980	1988	4	3	7	.571
Wesley Wolverines ^{[Defunct]}	15	2000	2019	30	15	45	.667
West Georgia Wolves ^{[FCS]}	2	1981	1982	3	1	4	.750

=== Program changes ===
- ^{FCS} Program has since joined Division I FCS.
- ^{D1} Program has since joined NCAA Division I but has dropped football.
- ^{D2} Program has since joined Division II.
- ^{D2-NF} Program has since joined Division II but has dropped football.
- ^{NAIA} Program has since joined the NAIA.
- ^{NF} Program remains in Division III but has dropped football.
- ^{Defunct} College has closed its doors.

== See also ==
- NCAA Division III football championship
- List of NCAA Division III football programs
- List of NCAA Division I FBS football bowl records
- List of NCAA Division I FCS playoff appearances by team
- List of NCAA Division II football championship appearances by team
- List of NAIA national football championship series appearances by team
