= Sartin =

Sartin is a surname. Notable people with this surname include:

- Dan Sartin (born 1946), American footballer
- David Sartin (born 1975), American football coach
- Paul Sartin (1971–2022), English singer, instrumentalist etc.

== See also ==
- Antoine Sartine
- Antoine de Sartine
- Sartini
- Sartinville, Mississippi
