= Steve Johnson (coach) =

American football player and coach (born 1956)

Biographical details
- Born: May 25, 1956 (age 70); Chicago, Illinois, U.S.

Playing career
- 1974–1977: Bethel (MN)
- Position: Defensive lineman

Coaching career (HC unless noted)
- 1980–1981: St. Cloud State (GA)
- 1982–1985: Cathedral HS (MN)
- 1986: Minnesota (GA/RB)
- 1987–1988: Montana State (WR)
- 1989–2023: Bethel (MN)

Head coaching record
- Overall: 252–110–1 (college); 20–17 (high school)
- Tournaments: 13–12 (NCAA D-III playoffs)

Accomplishments and honors

Championships
- 6 MIAC (2000–2001, 2006–2007, 2013, 2023); 3 MIAC Skyline Division (2021–2023)

Awards
- AFCA NCAA Division III COY (2022); 6× MIAC Coach of the Year (1989, 2000, 2006–2007, 2013, 2023)

Steve Johnson (born May 25, 1956) is an American former college football coach. He was the head football coach at Bethel University in Arden Hills, Minnesota from 1989 to 2023.

A native of Chicago, Johnson played college football at Bethel, starting for four seasons as a defensive lineman. He served as the head football coach at Cathedral High School in St. Cloud, Minnesota from 1982 to 1985, compiling a record of 20–17. In 1986, he was a graduate assistant at the University of Minnesota under head football coach John Gutekunst. Johnson then coached wide receivers at Montana State University, before returning to Bethel as head football coach in 1989.

== Head coaching record ==
=== College ===
Year	Team	Overall	Conference	Standing	Bowl/playoffs	D3^{#}
Bethel Royals (Minnesota Intercollegiate Athletic Conference) (1989–2023)
1989	Bethel	3–6–1	2–6–1	8th		
1990	Bethel	7–3	6–3	T–3rd		
1991	Bethel	6–3	5–3	T–3rd		
1992	Bethel	5–5	5–3	T–3rd		
1993	Bethel	2–8	2–7	T–8th		
1994	Bethel	7–3	6–3	T–3rd		
1995	Bethel	6–4	5–4	T–5th		
1996	Bethel	9–1	8–1	2nd		
1997	Bethel	6–4	5–4	T–5th		
1998	Bethel	8–2	7–2	T–2nd		
1999	Bethel	8–2	7–2	T–2nd		
2000	Bethel	10–1	9–0	1st	L NCAA Division III First Round	
2001	Bethel	9–2	8–1	T–1st	L NCAA Division III First Round	
2002	Bethel	5–5	5–3	T–3rd		
2003	Bethel	9–2	7–1	2nd	L NCAA Division III First Round	12
2004	Bethel	6–4	5–3	T–4th		
2005	Bethel	5–5	4–4	T–4th		
2006	Bethel	9–2	7–1	T–1st	L NCAA Division III First Round	17
2007	Bethel	12–2	8–0	1st	L NCAA Division III Semifinal	4
2008	Bethel	5–5	4–4	T–4th		
2009	Bethel	7–3	6–2	3rd		
2010	Bethel	12–2	7–1	2nd	L NCAA Division III Semifinal	10
2011	Bethel	8–2	6–2	T–2nd		25
2012	Bethel	9–3	6–2	T–2nd	L NCAA Division III Second Round	12
2013	Bethel	12–1	8–0	1st	L NCAA Division III Quarterfinal	6
2014	Bethel	7–3	6–2	2nd		
2015	Bethel	5–5	4–4	T–5th		
2016	Bethel	5–5	5–3	4th		
2017	Bethel	5–5	5–3	4th		
2018	Bethel	11–2	7–1	2nd	L NCAA Division III Quarterfinal	7
2019	Bethel	8–2	6–2	3rd		23
2020–21	No team—COVID-19					
2021	Bethel	8–3	6–2	1st (Skyline)	L NCAA Division III First Round	18
2022	Bethel	10–3	7–1	1st (Skyline)	L NCAA Division III Quarterfinal	8
2023	Bethel	8–3	7–1	1st (Skyline)	L NCAA Division III First Round	
Bethel:		252–110–1	201–81–1			
Total:		252–110–1				
National championship Conference title Conference division title or championship game berth

== See also ==
- List of college football career coaching wins leaders
