= 2004 Linfield Wildcats football team =

American college football season

2004 Linfield Wildcats football

NCAA Division III national champion NWC champion

Stagg Bowl, W 28–21 vs. Mary Hardin–Baylor
- Conference: Northwest Conference

Ranking
- D3Football.com: No. 1
- Record: 13–0 (5–0 NWC)
- Head coach: Jay Locey (9th season)
- Home stadium: Maxwell Field

2004 Northwest Conference football standings
	Conf.			Overall
Team	W		L	W		L
No. 1 Linfield $^	5	–	0	13	–	0
No. 23 Willamette ^	4	–	1	7	–	4
Whitworth	3	–	2	7	–	2
Pacific Lutheran	2	–	3	6	–	3
Puget Sound	1	–	4	5	–	4
Lewis & Clark	0	–	5	1	–	8
$ – Conference champion; ^ – NCAA Division III playoff participant; Rankings from D3football.com

The 2004 Linfield Wildcats football team was an American football team that represented Linfield University as a member of the Northwest Conference (NWC) during the 2004 NCAA Division III football season. In their ninth season under head coach Jay Locey, the Wildcats compiled a perfect 13–0 record and won the NCAA Division III national championship.

The team opened its season with a 58–17 victory over Division II Western Oregon. The following week, Linfield, ranked No. 2 in Division III, traveled east to face No. 7 Wisconsin–Stevens Point, winning that game by a 46–35 score.

After sweeping through the regular season and winning an NWC championship, the Wildcats advanced to the Division III playoffs. They received a bye in the first round and then defeated Wisconsin–La Crosse in the second round, Occidental in the quarterfinals, Rowan in the semifinals, and Mary Hardin–Baylor in the Stagg Bowl for the national championship.

Quarterback Brett Elliott broke the NCAA single-season touchdown record. His season total of 59 touchdown passes included a school record seven in the Division III quarterfinal game against Occidental. Elliott played high school football in Lake Oswego, Oregon, began his college career playing for Urban Meyer at Division I Utah, and transferred to Linfield after losing the starting job to Alex Smith.

Jay Locey won the AFCA Coach of the Year for NCAA Division III for the 2004 NCAA Division III football season.

Linfield also won NAIA national championships in 1982, 1984, and 1986. The program extended its record to 49 consecutive seasons with a winning record, the longest such streak in all divisions of college football.

== Schedule ==
Date	Opponent	Site	Result	Attendance	Source
September 11	Western Oregon*	Maxwell Field; McMinnville, OR	W 58–17	4,000	
September 18	at Wisconsin–Stevens Point*	Goerke Field; Stevens Points, WI	W 46–35	2,139	
October 2	at Pacific Lutheran	Cal Sparks Stadium; Puyallup, WA	W 40–21	4,200	
October 9	Whitworth	Maxwell Field; McMinnville, OR	W 48–37	3,000	
October 16	Southern Oregon*	Maxwell Field; McMinnville, OR	W 56–34	4,000	
October 23	at Puget Sound	Baker Stadium; Tacoma, WA	W 35–16	1,880	
October 30	Menlo*	Maxwell Field; McMinnville, OR	W 69–13	1,800	
November 6	at Lewis & Clark	Griswold Stadium; Portland, OR	W 62–7	1,350	
November 13	Willamette	Maxwell Field; McMinnville, OR	W 48–14	4,500	
November 27	Wisconsin–La Crosse*	Maxwell Field; McMinnville, OR (NCAA Division III second round)	W 52–14	4,500	
December 4	Occidental*	Maxwell Field; McMinnville, OR (NCAA Division III quarterfinal)	W 56–27	5,000	
December 11	Rowan*	Maxwell Field; McMinnville, OR (NCAA Division III semifinal)	W 52–0	4,000	
December 18	vs. Mary Hardin–Baylor*	Salem Football Stadium; Salem, VA (Stagg Bowl)	W 28–21	3,240	
*Non-conference game

== Roster ==
- 99 Robert Acevedo 4-6 Jr. Truckee, Calif. / Truckee
- 88 Daren Ackerman 3-6 Jr. Banks, Ore. / Banks
- 22 Sunder Aldridge 11-5 Jr. Omak, Wash. / Omak
- 8 Casey Allen 3-6 Sr. Newport, Ore. / Newport
- 70 Kaipo Amina 2-6 Fr. Cornelius, Ore. / Forest Grove
- 17 Jonny Anderson 10-5 Jr. Kenmore, Wash. / Texas Tech
- 22 Josh Armstrong 11-5 Sr. Oregon City, Ore. / Oregon City
- 97 Nathan Arnold 3-6 Fr. Edmonds, Wash. / Edmonds-Woodway
- 80 Tyson Banker 10-5 So. Hermiston, Ore. / Hermiston
- 8 Andrew Bean 0-6 So. Newcastle, Wash. / Eastside Catholic
- 61 Dimitri Beauliere 0-6 Fr. Vancouver, Wash. / Mountain View
- 12 Tim Benzel 3-6 Jr. Vancouver, Wash. / Evergreen
- 40 Kelley Bertrand 5-6 Sr. Dundee, Ore. / Newberg
- 86 Taylor Bethell 5-6 Jr. Albany, Ore. / West Albany
- 31 Chris Boock 8-5 Sr. Salem, Ore. / South Salem
- 34 Rodd Booth 10-5 So. Clackamas, Ore. / Barlow
- 40 Michael Borden 11-5 Fr. Mesa, Ariz. / Dobson
- 1 Jordan Boustead 11-5 Fr. Dallas, Ore. / Dallas
- 6 Brock Britt 10-5 Fr. Salem, Ore. / West Salem
- 44 Rob Brown 10-5 Jr. Medford, Ore. / South Medford
- 17 Jake Buzzetta 10-5 Fr. Hollister, Calif. / San Benito
- 42 Ryan Caffall 11-5 Jr. Newberg, Ore. / Whitworth
- 81 Brandon Carpenter 11-5 So. Redmond, Ore. / Redmond
- 81 Kyle Carpenter 2-6 Sr. The Dalles, Ore. / U. Oregon
- 26 Dan Carter 11-5 Fr. Gig Harbor, Wash. / Gig Harbor
- 2 George Carter 4-6 Sr. Salem, Ore. / South Salem
- 95 Brock Cote 3-6 Fr. Kirkland, Wash. / Lake Washington
- 25 Ian Crosby 0-6 Fr. Salem, Ore. / South Salem
- 20 Pete Cruickshank 7-5 So. Cashmere, Wash. / Cashmere
- 58 Jeff Denney 3-6 So. Scottsdale, Ariz. / Brophy Prep
- 63 Dwight Donaldson 1-6 Sr. Tacoma, Wash. / Stadium
- 5 Brett Elliott 3-6 Jr. Lake Oswego, Ore. / U. Utah
- 62 Zac Elliott 2-6 Fr. Sutherlin, Ore. / Sutherlin
- 27 Puni Ellis 10-5 Sr. Kailua, Hawaii / Kamehameha
- 87 Eric Fischer 5-6 So. Medford, Ore. / South Medford
- 96 Stan Fisher 2-6 So. Kailua, Hawaii / Punahou
- 45 Zach Fleming 2-6 Sr. Peoria, Ariz. / Sunrise Mountain
- 72 Drew Fogg 2-6 Fr. Wilsonville, Ore. / Wilsonville
- 93 Chad Foglesong 4-6 So. Centralia, Wash. / Centralia
- 4 Thomas Ford 9-5 Sr. Seattle, Wash. / Mountlake Terrace
- 7 Kevin Foreman 3-6 Sr. Medford, Ore. / North Medford
- 25 Andy Galpin 8-5 Sr. Rochester, Wash. / Rochester
- 10 Jesse Gibson 7-5 Fr. Tualatin, Ore. / Tualatin
- 74 Kyle Gibson 3-6 Sr. Eugene, Ore. / South Eugene
- 59 Zack Goldberg 2-6 Fr. Angels Camp, Calif. / Bret Harte
- 54 Michael Greenberg 2-6 Jr. Vancouver, Wash. / Mountain View
- 21 O.J. Gulley 10-5 Sr. Portland, Ore. / Reynolds
- 3 Brandon Hazenberg 11-5 Jr. Newberg, Ore. / Newberg
- 13 Nelson Helland 1-6 Fr. Gresham, Ore. / Centennial
- 50 Brody Hess 1-6 So. Keizer, Ore. / McNary
- 10 Eric Hillison 10-5 Sr. Beaverton, Ore. / Beaverton
- 77 James Holan 6-6 Jr. Mill Valley, Calif. / Tamalpais
- 79 Eric Holtgraves 5-6 Sr. Tualatin, Ore. / Tualatin
- 75 Sean Horning 0-6 Jr. Peoria, Ariz. / Centennial
- 44 Ryan Ishizu 8-5 Fr. Pukalani, Hawaii / Maui
- 6 Riley Jenkins 0-6 Sr. Salem, Ore. / Oregon State
- 63 Grant Jones 0-6 Fr. Newport, Ore. / Newport
- 65 Jimmy Joyce 3-6 Fr. Beaveton, Ore. / Beaverton
- 84 Tyler Kaluza 0-6 So. Issaquah, Wash / Skyline
- 52 Kevin Kauweloa 0-6 So. Waianae, Hawaii / Waianae
- 60 Drew Kehoe 3-6 Sr. West Linn, Ore. / West Linn
- 59 John Kemper 2-6 So. Gresham, Ore. / Sam Barlow
- 11 Rob Kerns 2-6 So. Potlatch, Idaho / Whitworth College
- 91 Mike Ketler 0-6 Jr. Salem, Ore. / South Salem
- 78 Jacob Kleffner 0-6 So. Tigard, Ore. / Jesuit
- 71 Danny Kleiber 3-6 So. Sammamish, Wash. / Skyline
- 26 Mordechai Kotler 8-5 Sr. Fountain Valley, Calif. / Fountain Valley
- 4 Natty Krauss 11-5 Fr. Selma, Ore. / Illinois Valley
- 98 Jeff Kutter 2-6 Fr. Banks, Ore. / Banks
- 20 Carl Lam 8-5 Fr. Kamuela, Hawaii / Hawaii Prep
- 41 Reece Lamson 11-5 So. Corning, Calif. / Feather River C.C.
- 3 Clint Languemi 0-6 Jr. Elk Grove, Calif. / Elk Grove
- 1 Scott Lasswell 10-5 So. Tigard, Ore. / Tigard
- 18 Brad Lau 9-5 So. Kamuela, Hawaii / Hawaii Prep
- 23 Tyler Legary 0-6 So. University Place, Wash. / Knox College
- 24 Chet Lemon 11-5 Fr. Knoxville, Tenn. / Campbellsville U.
- 57 Matt Lowe 2-6 Fr. Beaverton, Ore. / Beaverton
- 66 Jake Lucey 4-6 Jr. Keizer, Ore. / McNary
- 64 Joe Mannix 0-6 Fr. Canby, Ore. / Canby
- 18 Travis Masters 8-5 So. Elk Grove, Calif. / Elk Grove
- 38 Stefan Matheny 0-6 Jr. Lexington, Ore. / Heppner
- 89 Martin Mays 2-6 So. Lake Oswego, Ore. / Lake Oswego
- 33 Mitch McClelland 0-6 Fr. Tigard, Ore. / Tigard
- 95 Matt McCullough 2-6 Fr. Hillsboro, Ore. / Glencoe
- 73 Rob McCullough 5-6 Jr. Irvine, Calif. / University
- 29 Brad McKechnie 11-5 Sr. Puyallup, Wash. / Rogers
- 16 Brian Mehl 0-6 So. Eugene, Ore. / Churchill
- 16 D.J. Meier 1-6 Fr. Salem, Ore. / McKay
- 55 Chris Miles 2-6 Sr. Junction City, Ore. / Junction City
- 93 Gus Morrison 1-6 Fr. San Francisco, Calif. / George Washington
- 80 Reid Muller 1-6 Fr. Portland, Ore. / Franklin
- 14 Lance Nelson 11-5 Fr. Clackamas, Ore. / Clackamas
- 94 Scott Olsen 2-6 Fr. St. Helens, Ore. / St. Helens
- 28 Brandon Olson 0-6 So. Wilsonville, Ore. / Wilsonville
- 68 Andrew O'Neal 3-6 Jr. Tigard, Ore. / Tigard
- 9 Josh Ort 11-5 Jr. Silverton, Ore. / Silverton
- 38 Chris Parrette 9-5 Fr. Fremont, Calif. / Bellarmine Prep
- 51 Chris Pelow 1-6 So. Eugene, Ore. / Sheldon
- 48 Louis Penn 0-6 Fr. Troutdale, Ore. / Reynolds
- 46 Bryan Pereboom 11-5 Jr. Prescott, Ariz. / Prescott
- 52 Brandon Petersen 1-6 Sr. Lake Oswego, Ore. / Lake Oswego
- 89 Jacob Peterson 0-6 Fr. Myrtle Point, Ore. / Myrtle Point
- 41 Sean Radford 8-5 Fr. Myrtle Creek, Ore. / South Umpqua
- 53 Drew Ragan 11-5 Fr. Bellevue, Wash. / Sammamish
- 66 Lance Reem 8-5 Fr. Burbank, Calif. / Ribet Academy
- 98 Mike Richardson 0-6 Fr. Salem, Ore. / McKay
- 82 Colby Riddle 2-6 Fr. Lake Oswego, Ore. / U. Oregon
- 27 Derek Robinson 11-5 Fr. Marcola, Ore. / Mohawk
- 11 Cam Rogers 3-6 Jr. Tacoma, Wash. / Wilson
- 37 Phil Rombach 2-6 Jr. Portland, Ore. / Jesuit
- 36 Joe Romero 1-6 Jr. Melba, Idaho / Melba
- 2 Ed Rosario 7-5 Fr. Newberg, Ore. / Newberg
- 67 Kiki Sagoian 1-6 Sr. Kirkland, Wash. / Lake Washington
- 15 Trevor Scharer 4-6 So. Salem, Ore. / McKay
- 69 Zach Schumpert 1-6 Jr. Monroe, Wash. / Monroe
- 90 Joe Seifert 0-6 Fr. Canby, Ore. / Canby
- 76 Colby Shaffer 2-6 Jr. Tumwater, Wash. / Tumwater
- 13 Ryan Smith 9-5 Fr. Stanwood, Wash. / Stanwood
- 33 Ty Smith 8-5 Sr. Dallas, Ore. / Dallas
- 7 Eric Snow 1-6 Fr. Twin Falls, Idaho / Twin Falls
- 49 Nik Soo 0-6 So. Kamuela, Hawaii / Kamehameha
- 15 Ty Stanley 11-5 Fr. Vancouver, Wash. / Columbia River
- 92 Matt Steffens 3-6 So. Yuba City, Calif. / Yuba City
- 35 Keone Tawata 11-5 So. Honolulu, Hawaii / Radford
- 30 Chris Thorpe 9-5 Fr. Kanoehe, Hawaii / Radford
- 56 Brandon Tom 2-6 Jr. Kailua, Hawaii / Kamehameha
- 46 Tim Vaughan 9-5 Fr. Haines, Ore. / Baker
- 85 Joey Vieceli 1-6 So. Issaquah, Wash. / Skyline
- 82 Josh Vierra 11-5 So. Kaneohe, Hawaii / Kamehameha
- 62 Matt Wakeford-Evans 1-6 Fr. Sacramento, Calif. / Del Oro
- 48 Garrett Wales 0-6 Jr. Bend, Ore. / Mountain View
- 24 Travis Warneke 11-5 Fr. Portland, Ore. / Reynolds
- 83 Kyle Warner 2-6 So. Vancouver, Wash. / Mountain View
- 86 Tyler Weaver 10-5 Fr. Keizer, Ore. / McNary
- 19 James Wilson 2-6 Sr. Springfield, Ore. / Thurston
- 54 Kris Wood 3-6 Fr. Banks, Ore. / Banks
- 39 Andrew Woods 1-6 So. Portland, Ore. / Grant
- 23 Phil Zahn 0-6 Fr. Newberg, Ore. / Newberg
- 36 Alex Zerzan 9-5 Fr. Eugene, Ore. / Marist
