= Jay Accorsi =

American football player and coach (born 1963)

Biographical details
- Born: October 1, 1963 (age 63)

Playing career
- 1981–1984: Nichols
- Position: Running back

Coaching career (HC unless noted)
- 1989–1992: Nichols (assistant)
- 1993: Rowan (GA)
- 1994: Rowan (QB)
- 1995: Rowan (DB)
- 1996–1998: Rowan (AHC/DB)
- 1999–2001: Rowan (AHC/DC)
- 2002–2023: Rowan

Head coaching record
- Overall: 143–78

Accomplishments and honors

Championships
- 7 NJAC (2002, 2004–2006, 2010, 2013, 2014)

Awards
- 5× NJAC Coach of the Year (2002, 2004, 2005, 2013, 2014)

John "Jay" Accorsi Jr. (born October 1, 1963) is an American former college football coach. He was the head football coach at Rowan University, an NCAA Division III program in Glassboro, New Jersey. He began coaching at Rowan in 2002, and in his first season he led the Profs to a New Jersey Athletic Conference (NJAC) championship, which was their second in a row. He has guided them to seven outright or tied NJAC championships in all. In 2010, Rowan was the co-champion with Montclair State, but due to a tiebreaker they did not qualify for the postseason. In 2013, Rowan received the playoff bid because of their tiebreaker over SUNY Brockport. He retired following the 2023 season.

He played for Nichols.

He is a member of the South Jersey branch of the National Football Foundation. His son, Jack, is a soccer player.

== Head coaching record ==
Year	Team	Overall	Conference	Standing	Bowl/playoffs
Rowan Profs (New Jersey Athletic Conference) (2002–2023)
2002	Rowan	10–1	6–0	1st	L NCAA Division III First Round
2003	Rowan	7–3	3–2	3rd	
2004	Rowan	10–3	6–0	1st	L NCAA Division III Semifinal
2005	Rowan	11–2	5–1	1st	L NCAA Division III Semifinal
2006	Rowan	9–3	6–1	1st	L NCAA Division III Quarterfinal
2007	Rowan	4–6	2–5	T–6th	
2008	Rowan	8–2	7–2	T–2nd	
2009	Rowan	7–3	6–3	4th	
2010	Rowan	9–1	8–1	T–1st	
2011	Rowan	5–5	5–4	T–5th	
2012	Rowan	7–3	6–1	2nd	L NCAA Division III First Round
2013	Rowan	9–3	6–1	T–1st	L NCAA Division III Second Round
2014	Rowan	7–4	6–1	T–1st	L NCAA Division III First Round
2015	Rowan	6–4	5–4	6th	
2016	Rowan	6–4	5–4	T–5th	
2017	Rowan	4–6	3–6	8th	
2018	Rowan	6–4	5–4	T–5th	
2019	Rowan	4–6	4–3	4th	
2020–21	No team—COVID-19				
2021	Rowan	2–7	2–4	T–4th	
2022	Rowan	7–3	4–2	3rd	
2023	Rowan	5–5	4–2	T–2nd	
Rowan:		143–78	104–51		
Total:		143–78			
National championship Conference title Conference division title or championship game berth
