= John Welty (American football) =

American football coach (born c. 1954)

Biographical details
- Born: c. 1954 (age 71–72); Lisle, Illinois, U.S.
- Education: Illinois Benedictine College (1977)

Playing career
- 1973–1976: Illinois Benedictine

Coaching career (HC unless noted)
- 1977–1983: North Central (IL) (assistant)
- 1984–1988: Simpson (DC)
- 1989: Illinois Benedictine (DC)
- 1990–1997: Illinois Benedictine / Benedictine (IL)
- 1998: Westminster (MO) (DC)
- 1999–2023: Westminster (MO)

Head coaching record
- Overall: 130–176–1

Accomplishments and honors

Championships
- 1 SLIAC (1999); 1 UMAC (2003); 2 UMAC South Division (2004–2005)

Awards
- 3× UMAC South Division Coach of the Year (2003–2005); UMAC Co-Coach of the Year (2004); SLIAC Coach of the Year (1999)

John Welty (born c. 1954) is an American form college football coach. He was the head football coach for Westminster College in Fulton, Missouri, from 1999 to 2023. He also was the head football coach for Illinois Benedictine College—now known as Benedictine University—from 1990 to 1997. He also coached for North Central (IL) and Simpson.

Welty played college football for Illinois Benedictine and was named team captain during his senior year.

== Head coaching record ==
Year	Team	Overall	Conference	Standing	Bowl/playoffs
Illinois Benedictine / Benedictine Eagles (Northern Illinois-Iowa Conference) (1990–1997)
1990	Illinois Benedictine	1–8			
1991	Illinois Benedictine	2–8			
1992	Illinois Benedictine	7–3			
1993	Illinois Benedictine	4–5–1			
1994	Illinois Benedictine	3–6			
1995	Illinois Benedictine	1–8			
1996	Illinois Benedictine	0–9			
1997	Benedictine	3–7			
Illinois Benedictine / Benedictine:		21–54–1			
Westminster Blue Jays (St. Louis Intercollegiate Athletic Conference) (1999)
1999	Westminster	8–2	2–1	T–1st	
Westminster Blue Jays (NCAA Division III independent) (2000–2001)
2000	Westminster	2–8			
2001	Westminster	2–8			
Westminster Blue Jays (Upper Midwest Athletic Conference) (2002–2007)
2002	Westminster	7–2	3–1	2nd (Small)	
2003	Westminster	7–2	7–0	1st (South)	
2004	Westminster	6–3	6–1	1st (South)	
2005	Westminster	5–5	5–2	T–1st (South)	
2006	Westminster	4–5	4–3	T–2nd (South)	
2007	Westminster	4–5	4–3	2nd (South)	
Westminster Blue Jays (St. Louis Intercollegiate Athletic Conference) (2008)
2008	Westminster	4–5	4–3	4th	
Westminster Blue Jays (Upper Midwest Athletic Conference) (2009–2023)
2009	Westminster	5–5	2–1	2nd (Small)	
2010	Westminster	5–5	3–4	6th	
2011	Westminster	8–2	7–2	T–2nd	
2012	Westminster	4–6	2–6	T–6th	
2013	Westminster	2–8	2–7	T–8th	
2014	Westminster	6–4	6–3	T–4th	
2015	Westminster	6–4	6–3	3rd	
2016	Westminster	4–6	4–5	6th	
2017	Westminster	6–4	6–3	T–4th	
2018	Westminster	3–6	3–5	T–5th	
2019	Westminster	4–6	4–4	T–5th	
2020–21	Westminster	2–1	2–1	3rd	
2021	Westminster	3–5	2–4	5th	
2022	Westminster	1–9	1–5	6th	
2023	Westminster	1–8	1–4	T–5th	
Westminster:		109–122	86–71		
Total:		130–176–1			
National championship Conference title Conference division title or championship game berth
