= Accorsi =

Accorsi is an Italian surname. Notable people with the surname include:

- Ernie Accorsi (1941–2026), American football executive
- Jay Accorsi (born 1963), American football coach
- Stefano Accorsi (born 1971), Italian actor
