= Billy Crocker =

American football coach (born c. 1978)

Current position
- Title: Head coach
- Team: Eastern
- Conference: MAC
- Record: 25-17

Biographical details
- Born: c. 1978 (age 47–48)
- Education: Villanova University (2002); University at Albany (2005)

Playing career

Football
- 1997–2001: Coast Guard

Baseball
- 1997: Coast Guard
- Position: Defensive back (football)

Coaching career (HC unless noted)

Football
- 2002: Villanova (GA)
- 2003–2004: Albany (RB)
- 2005–2010: Villanova (DL)
- 2011: Villanova (ST/LB)
- 2012–2016: Villanova (DC)
- 2017–2018: UConn (DC)
- 2019–2021: Elon (DC/LB)
- 2022–present: Eastern

Head coaching record
- Overall: 25-17
- Tournaments: 2–1 (NCAA D-III playoffs)

Accomplishments and honors

Championships
- 2 MAC (2025, 2026)

Awards
- MAC Coach of the Year (2025)

William Crocker (born c. 1978) is an American college football coach. He has served as the head football coach for Eastern University (United States), a position he has held since 2022. He also coached for Villanova, Albany, UConn, and Elon. He played college football for Coast Guard as a defensive back as well as baseball.

== Head coaching record ==
Year	Team	Overall	Conference	Standing	Bowl/playoffs	D3^{#}	AFCA^{°}
Eastern Eagles (Middle Atlantic Conferences) (2023–present)
2023	Eastern	2–8	2–7	8th			
2024	Eastern	5–5	5–4	T–3rd			
2025	Eastern	10–2	8–1	1st	L NCAA Division III Third Round	21	23
2026	Eastern	8–2	7–1	1st			
Eastern:		17–15	15–12				
Total:		17–15					
