= Jon Drach =

American football coach (born c. 1981)

Current position
- Title: Head coach
- Team: Union (NY)
- Conference: Liberty
- Record: 16–15

Biographical details
- Born: c. 1981 (age 44–45); St. Charles, Illinois, U.S.
- Education: Western Michigan University (2004)

Playing career
- 2000–2003: Western Michigan
- Position: Quarterback

Coaching career (HC unless noted)
- 2007–2013: Hobart (QB)
- 2014–2017: Hobart (OC/QB)
- 2018–2023: Wilkes
- 2024–present: Union (NY)

Head coaching record
- Overall: 47–36
- Bowls: 1–0
- Tournaments: 0–1 (NCAA D-III playoffs)

Accomplishments and honors

Championships
- 1 Liberty (2025)

Jonathan Drach (born c. 1981) is an American college football coach. He is the head football coach for Union College, a position he has held since 2024. He was the head football coach for Wilkes University from 2018 to 2023. He also coached for Hobart. He played college football for Western Michigan as a quarterback.

== Head coaching record ==
Year	Team	Overall	Conference	Standing	Bowl/playoffs
Wilkes Colonels (Middle Atlantic Conference) (2018–2022)
2018	Wilkes	5–5	4–4	T–4th	
2019	Wilkes	8–3	6–2	3rd	
2020–21	No team—COVID-19				
2021	Wilkes	6–4	5–3	T–3rd	
2022	Wilkes	7–3	5–3	T–4th	
Wilkes Colonels (Landmark Conference) (2023)
2023	Wilkes	5–6	4–2	T–2nd	W Cape Henry
Wilkes:		31–21	24–14		
Union Garnet Chargers (Liberty League) (2024–present)
2024	Union	3–7	2–4	T–4th	
2025	Union	8–3	7–0	1st	L NCAA Division III First Round
2026	Union	5–5	4–3	4th	
Union:		16–15	13–7		
Total:		47–36			
