= Skyler Fultz =

American football coach (born c. 1989)

Current position
- Title: Head coach
- Team: McDaniel
- Conference: Centennial
- Record: 2–18

Biographical details
- Born: c. 1989 (age 36–37); Gratz, Pennsylvania, U.S.
- Education: McDaniel College (2011)

Playing career
- 2007–2010: McDaniel
- Positions: Tight end, wide receiver

Coaching career (HC unless noted)
- 2011: Susquehanna (TE)
- 2012–2013: King's (PA) (RB/TE)
- 2014: Allegheny (RB)
- 2015–2017: King's (PA) (QB)
- 2018–2022: King's (PA) (OC/QB)
- 2023: King's (PA)
- 2024–present: McDaniel

Head coaching record
- Overall: 10–21
- Bowls: 0–1

Skyler Fultz (born c. 1989) is an American college football coach. He is the head football coach for McDaniel College, a position he has held since 2024. He was the head football coach for King's College in 2023. He also coached for Susquehanna and Allegheny. He played college football for McDaniel as a tight end and wide receiver.

== Head coaching record ==
Year	Team	Overall	Conference	Standing	Bowl/playoffs
King's Monarchs (Middle Atlantic Conference) (2023)
2023	King's	8–3	7–2	2nd	L Centennial-MAC
King's:		8–3	7–2		
McDaniel Green Terror (Centennial Conference) (2024–present)
2024	McDaniel	1–9	0–6	7th	
2025	McDaniel	1–9	0–7	8th	
2026	McDaniel	0–0	0–0		
McDaniel:		2–18	0–13		
Total:		10–21			
