= Eastern Eagles football =

College football team

- First season: 2022; 4 years ago
- Athletic director: Brian Bingaman
- Head coach: Billy Crocker; 3rd season, 17–15 (.531)
- Location: Radnor, Pennsylvania
- Stadium: O'Hara Field
- NCAA division: Division III
- Conference: MAC
- Colors: Burgundy and white
- All-time record: 17–15 (.531)
- Mascot: Eagles
- Website: goeasterneagles.com

The Eastern Eagles football team represents Eastern University in college football at the NCAA Division III level. The Eagles are members of the Middle Atlantic Conference (MAC), fielding its team in the MAC since 2023. The Eagles play their home games at O'Hara Field in Radnor, Pennsylvania.

Their head coach is Billy Crocker, who took over the position in 2022 as the team began play in 2023.

== Conference affiliations ==
- Middle Atlantic Conferences (2023–present)

== List of head coaches ==
=== Key ===
Key to symbols in coaches list
| General | | Overall | | Conference | | Postseason (Note: Although the first Rose Bowl Game was played in 1902, it has been continuously played since the 1916 game, and is recognized as the oldest bowl game by the NCAA. "—" indicates any season prior to 1916 when postseason games were not played.) | |
|---|---|---|---|---|---|---|---|
| No. | Order of coaches (Note: A running total of the number of head coaches, with coaches who served separate tenures being counted only once. Interim head coaches are represented with "Int" and are not counted in the running total. "—" indicates the team played but either without a coach or no coach is on record. "X" indicates an interim year without play.) | GC | Games coached | CW | Conference wins | PW | Postseason wins |
| DC | Division championships | OW | Overall wins | CL | Conference losses | PL | Postseason losses |
| CC | Conference championships | OL | Overall losses | CT | Conference ties | PT | Postseason ties |
| NC | National championships | OT | Overall ties (Note: Overtime rules in college football were introduced in 1996, making ties impossible in the period since.) | C% | Conference winning percentage | | |
| † | Elected to the College Football Hall of Fame | O% | Overall winning percentage (Note: When computing the win–loss percentage, a tie counts as half a win and half a loss.) | | | | |

=== Coaches ===
List of head football coaches showing season(s) coached, overall records, conference records, postseason records, championships and selected awards
| No. | Name | Season(s) | GC | OW | OL | O% | CW | CL | C% | PW | PL | PT | DC | CC | NC | Awards |
|---|---|---|---|---|---|---|---|---|---|---|---|---|---|---|---|---|
| 1 | Billy Crocker | 2022–present | 32 | 17 | 15 | 0.531 | 15 | 12 | 0.556 | – | – | – | – | – | – | – |

== Year-by-year results ==
| National champions | Conference champions | Bowl game berth | Playoff berth |

| Season | Year | Head coach | Association | Division | Conference | Record | | | | | Postseason | Final ranking |
| Season | Year | Head coach | Association | Division | Conference | Overall | | Conference | | | Postseason | Final ranking |
| Season | Year | Head coach | Association | Division | Conference | Win | Loss | Finish | Win | Loss | Postseason | Final ranking |
Eastern Eagles
| 2023 | 2023 | Billy Crocker | NCAA | Division III | MAC | 2 | 8 | 8th | 2 | 7 | — | — |
| 2024 | 2024 | Billy Crocker | NCAA | Division III | MAC | 5 | 5 | T–3rd | 5 | 4 | — | — |
| 2025 | 2025 | Billy Crocker | NCAA | Division III | MAC | 10 | 2 | 1st | 8 | 1 | L NCAA Division III Third Round | — |

== Postseason appearances ==
=== NCAA Division III ===
The Eagles have made two appearances in the NCAA Division III playoffs, with a combined record of 1–1.

| Year | Round | Opponent | Result |
|---|---|---|---|
| 2025 | Second Round; Third Round | Franklin & Marshall; Susquehanna | W, 28–24; L, 0–29 |
| 2026 | First Round | Susquehanna | TBP |
