= Mark Murnyack =

American football coach (born 1974)

Current position
- Title: Defensive coordinator
- Team: Wilmington
- Conference: OAC

Biographical details
- Born: c. 1974 (age 51–52)
- Education: Juniata College (1996)

Playing career

Football
- 1992–1995: Juniata

Coaching career (HC unless noted)

Football
- 1997–2000: Norwich (ST/LB/DL)
- 2001–2005: Juniata (DC)
- 2006: Norwich (DL)
- 2007–2010: Norwich (DC/DL)
- 2011–2023: Norwich
- 2024–present: Wilmington (DC)

Baseball
- 1997–2000: Norwich (assistant)
- 2002–2005: Juniata (assistant)

Head coaching record
- Overall: 54–70
- Tournaments: 0–2 (NCAA D-III playoffs)

Accomplishments and honors

Championships
- 3 ECFC (2011, 2013, 2015)

Awards
- ECFC Coach of the Year (2011)

Mark Murnyack (born 1974) is an American college football coach. He is the defensive coordinator for Wilmington College, a position he has held since 2024. He was the head football coach for Norwich University from 2011 to 2023. He also coached and played college football for Juniata.

== Head coaching record ==
Year	Team	Overall	Conference	Standing	Bowl/playoffs
Norwich Cadets (Eastern Collegiate Football Conference) (2011–2016)
2011	Norwich	7–4	7–0	1st	L NCAA Division III First Round
2012	Norwich	7–3	4–2	4th	
2013	Norwich	7–4	6–1	T–1st	
2014	Norwich	7–4	5–2	T–2nd	
2015	Norwich	6–5	6–1	T–1st	L NCAA Division III First Round
2016	Norwich	5–5	5–2	2nd	
Norwich Cadets (New England Women's and Men's Athletic Conference) (2017–2023)
2017	Norwich	1–9	1–6	T–6th	
2018	Norwich	3–7	2–5	6th	
2019	Norwich	5–5	2–5	T–5th	
2020–21	No team—COVID-19				
2021	Norwich	2–8	1–5	6th	
2022	Norwich	3–7	2–4	T–4th	
2023	Norwich	1–9	0–7	8th	
Norwich:		54–70	41–40		
Total:		54–70			
National championship Conference title Conference division title or championship game berth
