= Jay Locey =

American football player and coach (born 1955)

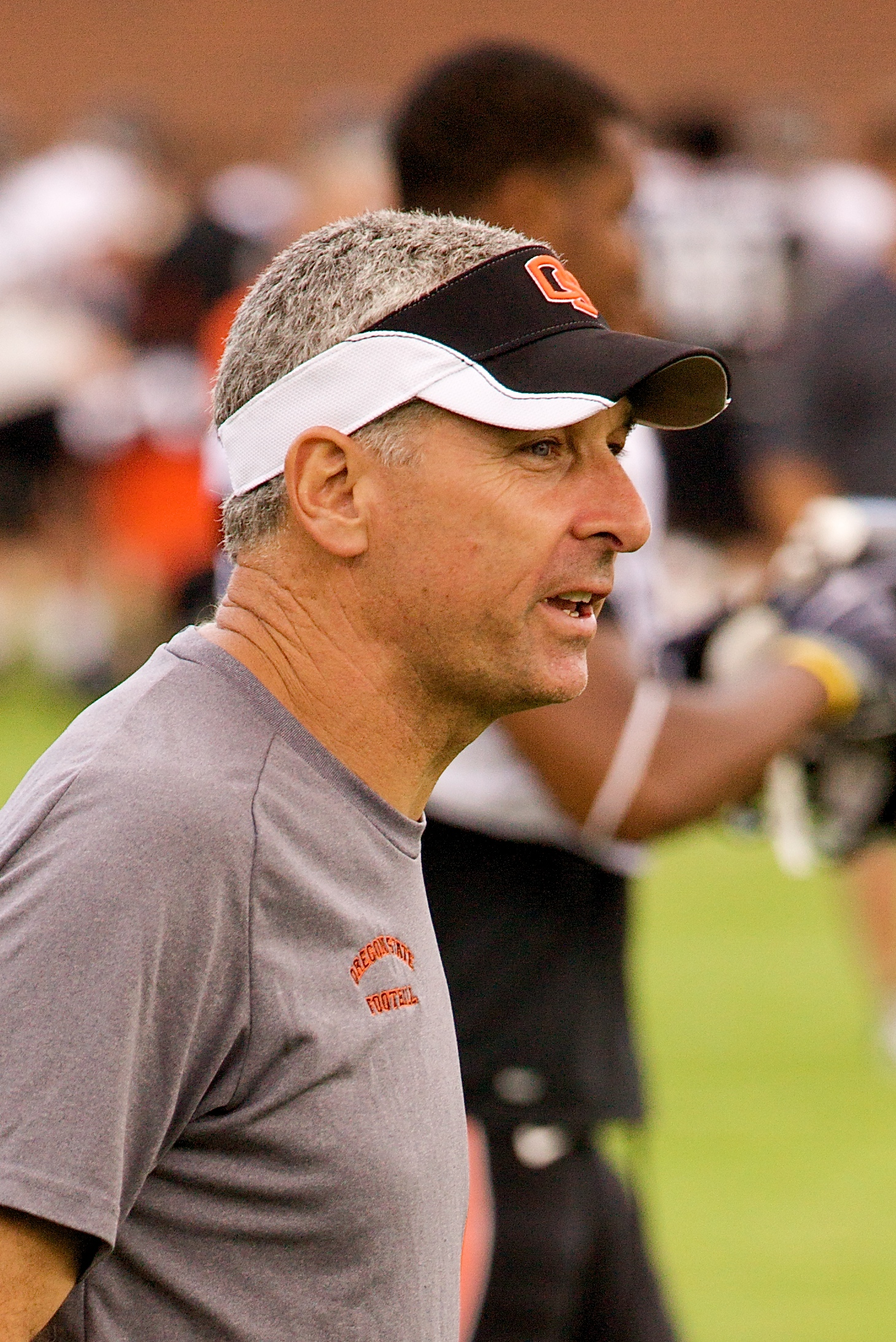

Profile
- Position: Defensive back

Personal information
- Born: February 4, 1955 (age 71); Corvallis, Oregon, U.S.

Career information
- College: Oregon State (1974–1976)
- NFL draft: 1977: undrafted

Career history

Playing
- Winnipeg Blue Bombers (1977)*
- * Offseason or practice squad member only

Coaching
- Oregon State (1977) Graduate assistant; Lakeridge HS (OR) (1978–1981) Secondary coach; Corvallis HS (OR) (1982) Assistant coach; Linfield (1983–1995) Defensive coordinator; Linfield (1996–2005) Head coach; Oregon State (2006–2014) Assistant head coach & wide receivers coach; Lewis & Clark (2015–2021) Head coach; New Jersey Generals (2022–2023) Running backs coach & tight ends coach

Awards and highlights
- NCAA Division III (2004); 6× NWC (2000, 2001, 2002, 2003, 2004, 2005); AFCA NCAA Division III COY (2004); 5× NWC Coach of the Year (2000, 2002, 2003, 2004, 2005); First-team All-Pac-8 (1976)

Head coaching record
- Regular season: 95–61 (.609)
- Postseason: 9–4 (.692)
- Career: 104–65 (.615)

Jay Locey (born February 3, 1955) is an American football coach and former player. Locey served as the head football coach at Linfield College from 1996 to 2005, compiling a record of 84–18.

== Early life ==
Locey attended Corvallis High School in his hometown of Corvallis, Oregon from 1969 to 1973. As a sophomore, he earned a spot on the varsity football team. The starting quarterback on that team was senior Mike Riley. That season the Spartans went 11–1, losing to North Salem in their homecoming game, and won the state championship, avenging their loss in the 1969 championship the year before. Locey was a reserve linebacker and played special teams that season.

Upon graduating from Corvallis High, he accepted a scholarship to play football at Oregon State. He started one game as a defensive back for the Beavers his sophomore season. His junior year, he became a starter and earned second team All Pacific-8 Conference. At the conclusion of his senior season, he was named first team All-Pacific-8 Conference.

Locey was honored twice as OSU's top student-athlete and received the outstanding senior award his senior year.

Following Locey's graduation, he signed with the Winnipeg Blue Bombers of the Canadian Football League (CFL). He was released in June 1977.

== Coaching career ==
Locey began his coaching career as a graduate assistant at Oregon State in 1977. After one season, he was hired at Lakeridge High School by coach Tom Smythe. He was the secondary coach for four seasons at Lakeridge. In 1982, he returned to Corvallis to coach at his alma mater, Corvallis High School, under head coach Gary Beck.

=== Linfield ===
After one season with the Spartans, he returned to the college ranks in 1983 when he was hired by Ad Rutschman at Linfield College as the defensive coordinator, replacing Mike Riley who had left to coach in the Canadian Football League (CFL).

Locey was promoted to head coach at Linfield in 1996. In his first four years, Locey's Wildcats had a record of 24–12. The Wildcats went 60–6 with an NCAA Division III Title in 2004 in Locey's final six seasons at the helm.

In his 10 seasons as the head coach, Locey guided the Wildcats to an 84–18 record and one NCAA Division III title. He was named the Northwest Conference Coach of the Year five times and at one point coached the Wildcats on a 41-game winning streak. He coached 16 All-Americans at Linfield.

=== Oregon State ===
In 2006, Mike Riley, who was then head coach for the Oregon State Beavers, hired Locey as the assistant head coach, bringing him back to his hometown. As the assistant head coach, he was also the tight ends coach.

In 2012, Riley promoted Locey from assistant head coach to chief of staff and promoted assistant Trent Bray to linebackers coach. As assistant head coach, Locey's duties included fundraising, alumni engagement, high school and community relations, player leadership development and team building activities.

=== Lewis & Clark ===
In December 2014, Locey became head football coach of the Lewis & Clark Pioneers in Portland. He went winless in his first two seasons as head coach. By the end of Locey's seven-year tenure, the pioneers were having the most success in almost a decade. They reached a season high in wins since 2012 when they won four games in 2019, and they won three or more games in consecutive years for the first time since 2011–2012. The win–loss record doesn't show the whole story of success, as Lewis and Clark Athletic Director Mark Pietrok stated, "Coach Locey has created a new era of Lewis & Clark football and followed through on his commitment to building our program. We are thankful to Jay for leading our student-athletes over the last seven seasons..." when he announced Locey's retirement following the 2021 season.

== Personal life ==
Locey is the grandson of former Oregon State athletic director Percy Locey. He and his wife, Susan, have three daughters.

== Head coaching record ==
Year	Team	Overall	Conference	Standing	Bowl/playoffs
Linfield Wildcats (Columbia Football Association) (1996)
1996	Linfield	5–4	3–2	3rd	
Linfield Wildcats (Northwest Conference) (1997–2005)
1997	Linfield	6–3	4–1	2nd	
1998	Linfield	7–2	4–1	2nd	
1999	Linfield	6–3	3–2	3rd	
2000	Linfield	9–1	5–0	1st	L NCAA Division III Second Round
2001	Linfield	7–2	4–1	T–1st	
2002	Linfield	10–1	5–0	1st	L NCAA Division III Quarterfinal
2003	Linfield	11–1	5–0	1st	L NCAA Division III Quarterfinal
2004	Linfield	13–0	5–0	1st	W NCAA Division III Championship
2005	Linfield	10–1	4–0	1st	L NCAA Division III Quarterfinal
Linfield:		84–18	42–7		
Lewis & Clark Pioneers (Northwest Conference) (2015–2021)
2015	Lewis & Clark	0–9	0–7	8th	
2016	Lewis & Clark	0–9	0–7	8th	
2017	Lewis & Clark	2–7	1–6	7th	
2018	Lewis & Clark	2–7	1–6	7th	
2019	Lewis & Clark	4–5	3–4	6th	
2020–21	No team—COVID-19				
2021	Lewis & Clark	3–6	2–5	6th	
Lewis & Clark:		11–43	7–35		
Total:		95–61			
National championship Conference title Conference division title or championship game berth
