= Sartini =

Sartini is a surname. Notable people with the surname include:

- Antonino Sartini (1889–1954), Italian painter
- Blake L. Sartini (born 1954), American entrepreneur
- Estelle Sartini (born 1973), French rugby union player
- Sidney Sartini, member of the American Bahari (band)

== See also ==
- Santini
- Sartin
