= Brett Elliott =

American football player and coach (born 1982)

Current position
- Title: Head coach
- Team: Lewis & Clark
- Conference: NWC
- Record: 6–4

Biographical details
- Born: June 11, 1982 (age 44); Portland, Oregon, U.S.

Playing career
- 2002–2003: Utah
- 2004–2005: Linfield
- 2006: San Diego Chargers
- 2007: Rhein Fire
- 2008: San Jose SaberCats
- 2010: Utah Blaze
- 2011: Georgia Force
- Position: Quarterback

Coaching career (HC unless noted)
- 2012: Mississippi State (GA)
- 2013–2014: Mississippi State (OQC)
- 2015: James Madison (co-OC/QB)
- 2016: Texas State (OC/QB)
- 2017: Mississippi State (QB)
- 2018: Texas State (QB)
- 2019–2024: Linfield (OC/QB)
- 2025–present: Lewis & Clark

Head coaching record
- Overall: 6–4

Accomplishments and honors

Awards
- Gagliardi Trophy (2005); Melberger Award (2005); D3Football.com Offensive Player of the Year (2005)

Brett Elliott (born June 11, 1982) is an American college football coach and former player. He is the head football coach for Lewis & Clark College, a position he has held since 2025. He also coached for Mississippi State, James Madison, Texas State, and Linfield.

== Playing career ==
=== College ===
Elliott was the starter for the 2002 Utah Utes football team and began the season as the starter for the 2003 team before breaking his wrist in the second game of the season and being replaced by Heisman finalist and future #1 NFL draft pick Alex Smith.

After Alex Smith took over the starting job, Brett transferred to Linfield University where he led the 2004 Linfield Wildcats football team to an NCAA Division III Football Championship, and set national college football records including the season record for touchdowns thrown in a season (61). In 2005, he won both the Gagliardi Trophy and the Melberger Award.

==== College statistics ====
		Passing							Rushing		
Season	Team	GP	Comp	Att	Pct	Yds	TD	INT	Att	Yds	TD
2002	Utah	8	130	221	58.82	1,529	10	8	28	31	2
2003	Utah	2	29	59	49.2	304	2	2	25	73	1
2004	Linfield	13	290	437	66.4	4,595	61	11			
2005	Linfield	11	277	396	69.9	4,019	49	9			
Totals		34	726	1113	65.2	10,441	122	30			

=== Professional ===
Elliot was on the San Diego Chargers roster in 2006. He served as a backup on the San Jose SaberCats in 2008, behind Mark Grieb. He did not throw a pass, but the SaberCats reached ArenaBowl XXII before losing to the Philadelphia Soul.

In 2010, Elliot became the starter for the Utah Blaze. He was 249-of-432 (57.6%) for 2,674 yards, 59 touchdowns and 17 interceptions. But the Blaze finished the 2010 season with a 2–14 record. In 2011, he joined the Georgia Force. Through three games, he led the AFL with a 126.06 quarterback rating.

== Coaching career ==
In 2012, Elliott was hired as the graduate assistant for the offense at Mississippi State University. In 2015, Elliott is served as the co-offensive coordinator and quarterback's coach for James Madison University. In 2016, Elliott went to Texas State University where he served as offensive coordinator and QB coach. On February 7, 2017, news broke that he would be returning to Mississippi State as the quarterbacks coach replacing Brian Johnson who left MSU to become offensive coordinator at Houston. In March 2018, it was announced that Elliot would be rejoining the coaching staff of Texas State football as the quarterbacks coach. From 2019 to 2024, Elliott was the co-offensive coordinator and quarterbacks coach for Linfield.

On January 29, 2025, Elliot was named head football coach for Lewis & Clark College.

== Head coaching record ==
Year	Team	Overall	Conference	Standing	Bowl/playoffs
Lewis & Clark Pioneers (Northwest Conference) (2025–present)
2025	Lewis & Clark	6–4	3–4	5th	
2026	Lewis & Clark	0–0	0–0		
Lewis & Clark:		6–4	3–4		
Total:		6–4			
