= Cleive Adams =

American football coach (born c. 1968)

Current position
- Title: Athletic director
- Team: Ferrum
- Conference: Carolinas

Biographical details
- Born: c. 1968 (age 57–58); Radford, Virginia, U.S.

Playing career
- 1987–1989: Ferrum

Coaching career (HC unless noted)
- 1998: Ferrum (SA)
- 2002–2003: Ferrum (DL)
- 2004: Ferrum (DC)
- 2005–2006: Washington & Lee (ST/DL)
- 2007–2013: Ferrum (DC)
- 2014–2019: Averett
- 2020–2023: Ferrum

Administrative career (AD unless noted)
- 2023–present: Ferrum

Head coaching record
- Overall: 42–52

Accomplishments and honors

Awards
- Ferrum Hall of Fame (2019)

Cleive Adams (born c. 1968) is an American athletic director and former college football coach. He is the athletic director for Ferrum College; a position he has held since 2023. He was the head football coach for Averett University from 2014 to 2019 and Ferrum College from 2020 to 2023. He also coached for Washington and Lee. He played college football for Ferrum and was inducted into the Ferrum Hall of Fame in 2019.

== Head coaching record ==
Year	Team	Overall	Conference	Standing	Bowl/playoffs
Averett Cougars (USA South Athletic Conference) (2014–2019)
2014	Averett	2–8	1–7	T–8th	
2015	Averett	2–7	2–4	T–4th	
2016	Averett	5–5	4–3	T–4th	
2017	Averett	6–4	5–2	T–2nd	
2018	Averett	8–2	6–1	2nd	
2019	Averett	7–3	5–2	T–2nd	
Averett:		30–29	23–19		
Ferrum Panthers (Old Dominion Athletic Conference) (2020–2023)
2020–21	Ferrum	2–3	2–2	4th	
2021	Ferrum	6–4	3–3	T–4th	
2022	Ferrum	1–9	1–6	T–6th	
2023	Ferrum	3–7	1–6	7th	
Ferrum:		12–23	7–17		
Total:		42–52			
