= Kevin Burke (American football coach) =

American football coach and former wide receiver

Current position
- Title: Head coach
- Team: Wilmington
- Conference: OAC
- Record: 4–16

Biographical details
- Education: Gettysburg College (1990); Stony Brook University (1992)

Playing career
- 1986–1989: Gettysburg
- Position: Wide receiver

Coaching career (HC unless noted)
- 1990–1991: Stony Brook (WR)
- 1992–1993: Hamilton (DB)
- 1994–1996: Juniata (OC)
- 1997: Norwich (OC)
- 1998–2003: Juniata
- 2004–2017: Gettysburg (OC)
- 2018–2019: Gettysburg
- 2020–2023: Minnesota Morris (AHC/OC)
- 2024–present: Wilmington

Head coaching record
- Overall: 31–69

Kevin Burke is an American college football coach and former player. He is the head football coach for Wilmington College, a position he has held since 2024. He previously served as the head football coach at Juniata College in Huntingdon, Pennsylvania from 1998 to 2003 and at his alma mater, Gettysburg College in Gettysburg, Pennsylvania, from 2018 to 2019.

== Head coaching record ==
| Year | Team | Overall | Conference | Standing | Bowl/playoffs |
|---|---|---|---|---|---|
Juniata Eagles (Middle Atlantic Conference) (1998–2003)
| 1998 | Juniata | 5–5 | 5–3 | 4th | |
| 1999 | Juniata | 6–4 | 6–3 | T–2nd | |
| 2000 | Juniata | 1–9 | 1–8 | T–10th | |
| 2001 | Juniata | 5–5 | 4–5 | T–5th | |
| 2002 | Juniata | 5–5 | 4–5 | 7th | |
| 2003 | Juniata | 3–7 | 3–6 | T–8th | |
| Juniata: | | 25–35 | 23–30 | | |
Gettysburg Bullets (Centennial Conference) (2018–2019)
| 2018 | Gettysburg | 1–9 | 1–8 | 9th | |
| 2019 | Gettysburg | 1–9 | 1–8 | 10th | |
| Gettysburg: | | 2–18 | 2–16 | | |
Wilmington Quakers (Ohio Athletic Conference) (2024–present)
| 2024 | Wilmington | 1–9 | 1–8 | T–8th | |
| 2025 | Wilmington | 3–7 | 1–7 | T–7th | |
| 2026 | Wilmington | 0–0 | 0–0 | | |
| Wilmington: | | 4–16 | 2–15 | | |
| Total: | | 31–69 | | | |
