= Belhaven Blazers football =

Intercollegiate American football team for Belhaven University

- First season: 1998; 28 years ago
- Athletic director: Scott Little
- Head coach: CJ Nightingale; 2nd season, 11–9 (.550)
- Location: Jackson, Mississippi
- Stadium: Belhaven Bowl (capacity: 5,000)
- NCAA division: Division III
- Conference: USA South
- Colors: Green and yellow
- All-time record: 127–163 (.438)
- Playoff record: 0–1 (.000)

College Football Playoff appearances
- Div. III: 1 (2023)

Conference championships
- USA South: 1 (2023)

Conference division championships
- Mid-South West Division: 1 (2006)
- Website: Belhaven Athletics

The Belhaven Blazers football program is the intercollegiate American football team for Belhaven University in Jackson, Mississippi. The team competes at the Division III level of the National Collegiate Athletic Association NCAA), and is a member of the USA South Athletic Conference. Belhaven's first football team was fielded in 1998. It was a member of the Mid-South Conference in the National Association of Intercollegiate Athletics (NAIA) from its inception through the 2014 season, after which it joined the NCAA Division III American Southwest Conference. Following the 2021 season, Belhaven planned to move to the USA South, but that conference agreed to split into two leagues after the 2021–22 school year. Belhaven joined the eight USA South members that left to form the Collegiate Conference of the South (CCS), which does not sponsor football. As part of the separation agreement, all CCS members with football teams became USA South members in that sport.

The team plays its home games at The Belhaven Bowl Stadium in Jackson. CJ Nightingale has served as the team's head coach since 2024.

== Playoff appearances ==
=== NCAA Division III ===
The Blazers have appeared in the Division III playoffs one time, with an overall record of 0–1.

Year	Round	Opponent	Result
2023	First Round	North Central (IL)	L 0–65
