= Mike McElroy =

American football coach (born 1988)

Current position
- Title: Head coach
- Team: Bethel (MN)
- Conference: MIAC
- Record: 28–6

Biographical details
- Born: September 13, 1988 (age 38); Lowell, Michigan, U.S.
- Education: Southern Illinois University (2012)

Playing career
- 2007–2011: Southern Illinois
- Position: Defensive back

Coaching career (HC unless noted)
- 2012: Marion HS (IL) (WR/DB)
- 2013: Elverado-Trico HS (IL)
- 2014–2015: Minnesota (GA)
- 2016: Concordia–St. Paul (DC/DB)
- 2017–2023: Bethel (MN) (DC)
- 2024–present: Bethel (MN)

Head coaching record
- Overall: 28–6 (college); 1–8 (high school)
- Tournaments: 5–2 (NCAA D-III playoffs)

Accomplishments and honors

Championships
- 1 MIAC (2025); 1 MIAC Skyline Division (2024)

Awards
- 2× MVFC (2009, 2011); 1× MIAC Coach of the Year (2025)

Michael McElroy (born September 13, 1988) is an American college football coach. He is the head football coach for Bethel University, a position he has held since 2024. He was the head football coach for Elverado High School and Trico High School's co-op football team in 2013. He also coached for Marian High School, Minnesota, and Concordia–St. Paul. He played college football for Southern Illinois as a defensive back.

== Head coaching record ==
=== College ===
Year	Team	Overall	Conference	Standing	Bowl/playoffs	D3^{#}	AFCA^{°}
Bethel Royals (Minnesota Intercollegiate Athletic Conference) (2024–present)
2024	Bethel	11–3	6–2	1st (Skyline)	L NCAA Division III Quarterfinal	24	
2025	Bethel	12–1	9–0	1st	L NCAA Division III Quarterfinal	4	5
2026	Bethel	5–2	5–1				
Bethel:		28–6	20–3				
Total:		28–6					
National championship Conference title Conference division title or championship game berth

=== High school ===
Year	Team	Overall	Conference	Standing	Bowl/playoffs
Elverado-Trico Falcons () (2013)
2013	Elverado-Trico	1–8	1–8	10th	
Elverado-Trico:		1–8	1–8		
Total:		1–8			
