= Bethel Royals football =

- First season: 1947; 79 years ago
- Athletic director: Greg Peterson
- Head coach: Mike McElroy; 2nd season, 23–4 (.852)
- Location: Arden Hills, Minnesota
- Stadium: Royal Stadium (capacity: 8,000)
- Conference: MIAC
- Colors: Navy blue and gold
- All-time record: 360–332–7 (.520)

Conference championships
- (6) 2000, 2001, 2006, 2007, 2013, 2023
- Consensus All-Americans: 18
- Website: athletics.bethel.edu/football

The Bethel Royals football program represents Bethel University of Arden Hills, Minnesota in college football. Bethel competes at the NCAA Division III level as members of the Minnesota Intercollegiate Athletic Conference (MIAC). The head coach of the Royals is Mike McElroy, who has held the position since 2024.

Bethel plays its home games at Royal Stadium, located on the campus in Arden Hills, Minnesota. Royal Stadium was built in 1995 and renovated in 2001 and 2021.

== History ==
Bethel has had 15 head coaches since organized football started in 1947 adopting the nickname "Royals". The winningest coach in program history was Steve Johnson with a 252–110–1 career record. He is ranked No. 33 in all time wins as a head coach in NCAA college football. On April 2, 2016, he was inducted into the Minnesota Football Coaches Hall of Fame. He retired after the 2023 season.

Mike McElroy was named the head football coach for the 2024 season. McElroy served as the Royals’ defensive coordinator for the previous seven years after joining the program in 2017.

Bethel's biggest conference rival is Saint John's University. Bethel defeated the No. 4 ranked St. John's 17-10 in 2025 in Arden Hills. Bethel defeated No. 2 ranked Saint John's 28–24 on September 24, 2022 in Arden Hills. Bethel finished the 2022 season ranked No. 5 in the country. Bethel won 7 of the 8 meetings against Saint John's between 2006 and 2013.

Bethel has won 7 MIAC conference championships (2000, 2001, 2006, 2007, 2013, 2023, 2025). Bethel has appeared in 14 NCAA playoff appearances (2000, 2001, 2003, 2006, 2007, 2010, 2012, 2013, 2018, 2021, 2022, 2023, 2024, 2025). Bethel's deepest playoff run was appearing in the NCAA Division III playoff semifinals (2007, 2010).

== Postseason appearances ==
=== NCAA Division III playoffs ===
The Royals have made fifteen appearances in the NCAA Division III playoffs, with a combined record of 20–15.

Year	Round	Opponent	Result
2000	First Round	Pacific Lutheran	L, 13–41
2001	First Round	Wisconsin–Stevens Point	L, 27–37
2003	First Round	Wartburg	L, 7–21
2006	First Round	Wisconsin–La Crosse	L, 21–28
2007	First Round; Second Round; Quarterfinals; Semifinals	Concordia Wisconsin; Wisconsin–Eau Claire; Central (IA); Mount Union	W, 28–0; W, 21–12; W, 27–13; L, 14–62
2010	First Round; Second Round; Quarterfinals; Semifinals	Wartburg; Wheaton (IL); St. Thomas (MN); Mount Union	W, 28–20; W, 15–0; W, 12–7; L, 14–34
2012	First Round; Second Round	Concordia Chicago; Wisconsin–Oshkosh	W, 24–23; L, 14–37
2013	First Round; Second Round; Quarterfinals	St. Scholastica; Wartburg; North Central (IL)	W, 70–13; W, 34–27; L, 17–41
2018	First Round; Second Round; Quarterfinals	Wartburg; North Central (IL); Wisconsin–Whitewater	W, 41–14; W, 27–24; L, 12–26
2021	First Round	Central (IA)	L, 35–61
2022	First Round; Second Round	Wheaton (IL); Linfield; Mary Hardin–Baylor	W, 34–32; W, 30–13; L, 28–41
2023	First Round	Wisconsin–Whitewater	L, 14–42
2024	First Round; Second Round; Third Round; Quarterfinals	Coe; Lake Forest; Wartburg; Susquehanna	W, 31–26; W, 48–21; W, 24–14; L, 21–24
2025	Second Round; Third Round; Quarterfinals	Coe; Wisconsin–Platteville; North Central (IL)	W, 51–26; W, 35–24; L, 21–35

== First-team All-Americans ==
Name	Year	Position
Jim Nelson	1963	Running Back
Rey Sheperd	1963	Lineman
Kevin Hallstrom	1976	Defensive Back
Trent Anderson	1990	Quarterback
Jack Negren	1990	Wide Receiver
Vincent Hooper	1993	Wide Receiver
Jeremy Tvedt	1996	Running Back
Chico Rowland	1999	Offensive Tackle
Ben Matthews	2000	Cornerback
Mike Johnson	2001	Running Back
Phil Porta	2006	Running Back
Brandon Carr	2007	Defensive Back
Seth Mathis	2012, 2013	Linebacker
Dawson Brown	2018	Defensive Back
Kyle Kilgore	2018	Defensive End
Nate Farm	2021	Defensive Back
Travis Sinclair	2022	Offensive Line
Matt Jung	2024	Defensive Back
Caden DeWall	2024	Edge Rusher
Albert Rundell	2025	Wide Receiver
Devin Williams	2025	Defensive Back

== Allstate and AFCA good works team ==
Name	Year	Position
Eric Runyan	1998	Wide Receiver
Chico Rowland	1999	Outside Linebacker
Josh Gingerich	2002	Outside Linebacker
Matt Wassink	2004	Linebacker
A.J. Parnell	2005	Quarterback
Reid Velo	2009	Wide Receiver
J.D. Mehlhorn	2013	Safety
Joshua Perkins	2014	Offensive Tackle
Matt Mehlhorn	2015	Defensive Back
Drew Neuville	2016	Tight End
Josh Dalki	2017	Inside Linebacker
Kyle Kilgore	2018	Defensive End
Danny Muñoz	2019	Offensive Line
Mike Delich	2020	Linebacker/Running Back
Jaran Roste	2021	Quarterback
Matthew Feldick	2022	Defensive Back
Evan Ginter	2023	Offensive Line
Aaron Ellingson	2024	Running Back
Devin Williams	2025	Defensive Back

== Hall of Fame ==
Name	Year of Graduation	Position
Rey Sheperd	1962	Offensive Tackle
Jim Nelson	1964	Running Back
Duane Gibson	1966	Linebacker
Don Land	1966	Running Back
Al Selander	1967	Quarterback
Terry Karlsgodt	1975	Linebacker
Willie Gardner	1976	Running Back
Craig Hansen	1976	Offensive Tackle
Kevin Hallstrom	1977	Defensive Back
John Holine	1977	Quarterback
Kim Walker	1977	Wide Receiver
Mike Anderson	1978	Linebacker
Ken Cooper	1982	Wide Receiver
Jimmy Miller	1983	Defensive Back
Bryan Johnson	1984	Wide Receiver
Trent Anderson	1991	Quarterback
Chub Reynolds		Head coach

== Coaching staff ==
- Head Coach: Mike McElroy
- Offensive Coordinator/Quarterbacks: Collin Duling
- Defensive Coordinator/Defensive Backs: Mike McElroy
- Linebackers/Recruiting Coordinator: Kyle Kilgore
- Defensive Backs/Special Teams: Tavian Swanson
- Offensive Line: Mathias Durie
- Outside Linebackers: Tyler Krebs
- Defensive Line: Brady Bomsta
- Running Backs: Jaran Roste
- Cornerbacks: Brooks Byrd
- Wide Receivers: Matt Houston
- Tight Ends: Tim Carlson
- Offensive Assistant: Eric Tulberg

== NFL players ==
- Matt Eller, Defensive Line (2002) – Minnesota Vikings and Green Bay Packers
- Cory Svihla, Linebacker (2010) – Minnesota Vikings
- Mitch Elliot, Offensive Tackle (2011) – Minnesota Vikings
- Seth Mathis, Linebacker (2013) – Minnesota Vikings
- Mitch Hallstrom, Wide receiver (2013) – Minnesota Vikings
- Dawson Brown, Defensive Back (2019) - Atlanta Falcons
- Kyle Kilgore, Defensive Line (2019) – Minnesota Vikings
- Travis Sinclair, Offensive Line (2022) - Minnesota Vikings
