= Mike Cebrosky =

American football coach (born c. 1985)

Current position
- Title: Head coach
- Team: King's (PA)
- Conference: MAC
- Record: 15–7

Biographical details
- Born: c. 1985 (age 40–41); Lehighton, Pennsylvania, U.S.
- Education: Delaware Valley College (2008)

Playing career
- 2003–2004: Buffalo
- 2005–2007: Delaware Valley
- Position: Guard

Coaching career (HC unless noted)
- 2008–2009: Nazareth Area HS (PA) (OL/DL)
- 2010–2013: King's (PA) (LB)
- 2014–2022: King's (PA) (DC/LB)
- 2023: King's (PA) (assoc. HC/DC/LB)
- 2024–present: King's (PA)

Head coaching record
- Overall: 15–7
- Tournaments: 1–1 (NCAA D-III playoffs)

Accomplishments and honors

Championships
- 1 MAC (2024)

Awards
- MAC Coach of the Year (2024)

Michael Cebrosky (born c. 1985) is an American college football coach. He is the head football coach for King's College, a position he has held since 2024. He also coached for Nazareth Area High School and was an assistant for King's (PA) for 14 years from 2010 to 2023. He played college football for Buffalo and Delaware Valley as a guard.

== Head coaching record ==
Year	Team	Overall	Conference	Standing	Bowl/playoffs
King's Monarchs (Middle Atlantic Conference) (2024–present)
2024	King's	10–2	9–0	1st	L NCAA Division III Second Round
2025	King's	5–5	5–4	T–5th	
2026	King's	0–0	0–0		
King's:		15–7	14–4		
Total:		15–7			
National championship Conference title Conference division title or championship game berth
