= CJ Nightingale =

American football coach (born c. 1991)

Current position
- Title: Head coach
- Team: Belhaven
- Conference: USA South
- Record: 11–9

Biographical details
- Born: c. 1991 (age 34–35); Colon, Michigan, U.S.
- Education: Wheaton College (2014)

Playing career
- 2010–2013: Wheaton (IL)
- Position: Cornerback

Coaching career (HC unless noted)
- 2016: Greenville (DB)
- 2017–2019: Indiana Wesleyan (ST/LB)
- 2020–2023: Wheaton (IL) (DC/DB)
- 2024–present: Belhaven

Head coaching record
- Overall: 11–9

CJ Nightingale (born c. 1991) is an American college football coach. He is the head football coach for Belhaven University, a position he has held since 2024. He also coached for Greenville, Indiana Wesleyan, and Wheaton (IL). He played college football for Wheaton (IL) as a cornerback.

== Head coaching record ==
Year	Team	Overall	Conference	Standing	Bowl/playoffs
Belhaven Blazers (USA South Athletic Conference) (2024–present)
2024	Belhaven	5–5	5–3	T–4th	
2025	Belhaven	6–4	5–2	T–2nd	
2026	Belhaven	0–0	0–0		
Belhaven:		11–9	10–5		
Total:		11–9			
