= Vince Luvara =

American football coach (born 1989)

Current position
- Title: Head coach
- Team: Hampden–Sydney
- Conference: ODAC
- Record: 12–8

Biographical details
- Born: February 26, 1989 (age 37); Pittsburgh, Pennsylvania, U.S.
- Education: Allegheny College (2011); Misericordia University (2014)

Playing career
- 2007–2010: Allegheny
- Position: Inside linebacker

Coaching career (HC unless noted)
- 2012–2013: Misericordia (GA/LB)
- 2014: Allegheny (LB)
- 2015: Washington & Jefferson (LB)
- 2016–2023: Washington & Jefferson (DC)
- 2024–present: Hampden–Sydney

Head coaching record
- Overall: 12–8

Vincent Luvara (born February 26, 1989) is an American college football coach. He is the head football coach for Hampden–Sydney College, a position he has held since 2024. He also coached for Misericordia, Allegheny, and Washington & Jefferson. He played college football for Allegheny as an inside linebacker.

== Head coaching record ==
Year	Team	Overall	Conference	Standing	Bowl/playoffs
Hampden–Sydney Tigers (Old Dominion Athletic Conference) (2024–present)
2024	Hampden–Sydney	5–5	3–4	T–5th	
2025	Hampden–Sydney	7–3	5–3	4th	
2026	Hampden–Sydney	0–0	0–0		
Hampden–Sydney:		12–8	8–7		
Total:		12–8			
