= David Sartin =

American football coach (born c. 1975)

Current position
- Title: Offensive line coach
- Team: McDaniel
- Conference: Centennial

Biographical details
- Born: c. 1975 (age 50–51)
- Education: University of Mount Union (1998)

Playing career
- 1993–1996: Mount Union
- Position: Offensive tackle

Coaching career (HC unless noted)
- 1997: Mount Union (SA)
- 1998–2000: Wartburg (DL)
- 2001–2002: North Park (DC/DL)
- 2003–2005: North Park (AHC/DC/DL)
- 2006: Grand Valley State (GA)
- 2007–2008: Grand Valley State (assistant OL)
- 2009–2018: Michigan Tech (OL)
- 2019–2020: Finlandia (AHC/DC/DL)
- 2021–2022: McDaniel (OL)
- 2023: McDaniel (interim HC)
- 2024–present: McDaniel (OL)

Head coaching record
- Overall: 0–10

David H. Sartin (born c. 1975) is an American college football coach. He is the offensive line coach for McDaniel College, a position he has held since 2024. He was the interim head football coach for McDaniel College in 2023. He also coached for Mount Union, Wartburg, North Park, Grand Valley State, Michigan Tech, and Finlandia. He played college football for Mount Union as an offensive tackle.

== Head coaching record ==
| Year | Team | Overall | Conference | Standing | Bowl/playoffs |
|---|---|---|---|---|---|
McDaniel Green Terror (Centennial Conference) (2023)
| 2023 | McDaniel | 0–10 | 0–6 | 7th | |
| McDaniel: | | 0–10 | 0–6 | | |
| Total: | | 0–10 | | | |
