= Pat Ruley =

American football coach (born c. 1991)

Current position
- Title: Head coach
- Team: Rowan
- Conference: NJAC
- Record: 14–6–1

Biographical details
- Born: c. 1991 (age 34–35)
- Education: Rowan University (2013)

Playing career
- 2009–2012: Rowan
- Position: Linebacker

Coaching career (HC unless noted)
- 2013: Towson (DQC)
- 2014–2015: Muhlenberg (OLB)
- 2016: Alderson Broaddus (ST/LB)
- 2017–2022: Susquehanna (DC/ILB)
- 2023: Susquehanna (assoc. HC/DC)
- 2024–present: Rowan

Head coaching record
- Overall: 14–6–1
- Bowls: 1–0

Accomplishments and honors

Awards
- 2× All-NJAC (2011–2012)

Pat Ruley (born c. 1991) is an American college football coach. He is the head football coach for Rowan University, a position he has held since 2024. He also coached for Towson, Muhlenberg, Alderson Broaddus, and Susquehanna. He was a two-time All-New Jersey Athletic Conference (NJAC) linebacker for Rowan.

== Head coaching record ==
| Year | Team | Overall | Conference | Standing | Bowl/playoffs |
|---|---|---|---|---|---|
Rowan Profs (New Jersey Athletic Conference) (2024–present)
| 2024 | Rowan | 6–4 | 4–2 | 3rd | |
| 2025 | Rowan | 8–2–1 | 5–2 | 3rd | W Asa S. Bushnell |
| 2026 | Rowan | 0–0 | 0–0 | | |
| Rowan: | | 14–6–1 | 9–4 | | |
| Total: | | 14–6–1 | | | |
