= 2004 NCAA Division III football season =

American college football season

- Regular season: August – November 2004
- Playoffs: November – December 2004
- National championship: Salem Football Stadium; Salem, VA
- Champion: Linfield (1)
- Gagliardi Trophy: Rocky Myers (S), Wesley (DE)

The 2004 NCAA Division III football season, part of the college football season organized by the NCAA at the Division III level in the United States, began in August 2004, and concluded with the NCAA Division III Football Championship, also known as the Stagg Bowl, in December 2004 at Salem Football Stadium in Salem, Virginia. The Linfield Wildcats won their first Division III championship by defeating the Mary Hardin–Baylor Crusaders, 28−21.

The Gagliardi Trophy, given to the most outstanding player in Division III football, was awarded to Rocky Myers, safety from Wesley (DE).

== Conference changes and new programs ==
School	2003 conference	2004 conference
Eastern Oregon Mountaineers	Independent	Cascade (NAIA)
Stillman Tigers	Independent	Independent (Division II)

== Conference standings ==
2004 American Southwest Conference football standings
	Conf.			Overall
Team	W		L	W		L
No. 4 Hardin–Simmons $^	9	–	0	10	–	1
No. 2 Mary Hardin–Baylor ^	8	–	1	13	–	2
Texas Lutheran	7	–	2	7	–	3
Howard Payne	6	–	3	7	–	3
Louisiana College	4	–	5	5	–	5
East Texas Baptist	4	–	5	4	–	6
Austin	3	–	6	3	–	7
Sul Ross	2	–	7	2	–	8
McMurry	1	–	8	2	–	8
Mississippi College	1	–	8	1	–	9
$ – Conference champion; ^ – NCAA Division III playoff participant; Rankings from D3football.com

2004 Atlantic Central Football Conference standings
	Conf.			Overall
Team	W		L	W		L
Salisbury $^	5	–	0	10	–	1
Wesley	4	–	1	8	–	2
Brockport	3	–	2	6	–	4
Buffalo State	2	–	3	4	–	6
Frostburg State	1	–	4	2	–	8
Apprentice §	0	–	5	3	–	7
$ – Conference champion; ^ – NCAA Division III playoff participant; § – Not an NCAA member

2004 Centennial Conference football standings
	Conf.			Overall
Team	W		L	W		L
Johns Hopkins +	4	–	2	9	–	2
Franklin & Marshall +	4	–	2	8	–	3
Muhlenberg +	4	–	2	8	–	3
Dickinson +	4	–	2	6	–	4
McDaniel +	4	–	2	6	–	4
Gettysburg	1	–	5	1	–	9
Ursinus	0	–	6	1	–	9
+ – Conference co-champions

2004 College Conference of Illinois and Wisconsin football standings
	Conf.			Overall
Team	W		L	W		L
No. 5 Carthage +^	6	–	1	11	–	2
No. 12 Wheaton (IL) +^	6	–	1	10	–	2
Augustana (IL)	5	–	2	7	–	3
North Central (IL)	4	–	3	7	–	3
Millikin	4	–	3	5	–	5
Illinois Wesleyan	2	–	5	3	–	7
Elmhurst	1	–	6	4	–	6
North Park	0	–	7	1	–	9
$ – Conference champion; ^ – NCAA Division III playoff participant; Rankings from D3football.com

2004 Empire 8 Athletic Conference football standings
	Conf.			Overall
Team	W		L	W		L
No. 15 St. John Fisher +^	5	–	1	9	–	2
No. 20 Ithaca +	5	–	1	9	–	2
Springfield	4	–	2	8	–	2
Alfred	3	–	3	8	–	3
Norwich	3	–	3	7	–	4
Utica	1	–	5	3	–	7
Hartwick	0	–	6	1	–	8
+ – Conference co-champions; ^ – NCAA Division III playoff participant; Rankings from D3football.com

2004 Illini–Badger Football Conference standings
	Conf.			Overall
Team	W		L	W		L
Lakeland +	6	–	1	8	–	2
Concordia (WI) +	6	–	1	7	–	3
Aurora +^	6	–	1	6	–	5
MacMurray	4	–	3	6	–	3
Greenville	3	–	4	3	–	6
Eureka	2	–	5	3	–	7
Benedictine (IL)	1	–	6	1	–	9
Concordia (IL)	0	–	7	0	–	10
+ – Conference co-champions; ^ – NCAA Division III playoff participant

2004 Heartland Collegiate Athletic Conference football standings
	Conf.			Overall
Team	W		L	W		L
Mount St. Joseph $^	6	–	0	10	–	1
Hanover	5	–	1	6	–	4
Anderson (IN)	3	–	3	5	–	5
Bluffton	3	–	3	5	–	5
Franklin (IN)	3	–	3	5	–	5
Defiance	1	–	5	1	–	9
Manchester	0	–	6	0	–	10
$ – Conference champion; ^ – NCAA Division III playoff participant

2004 Iowa Conference football standings
	Conf.			Overall
Team	W		L	W		L
No. 24 Wartburg +^	6	–	2	8	–	3
Coe +	6	–	2	7	–	3
Buena Vista	5	–	3	6	–	4
Central (IA)	5	–	3	6	–	4
Luther	5	–	3	6	–	4
Simpson (IA)	4	–	4	6	–	4
Loras	3	–	5	4	–	6
Cornell (IA)	1	–	7	2	–	8
Dubuque	1	–	7	2	–	8
+ – Conference co-champions; ^ – NCAA Division III playoff participant; Rankings from D3football.com

2004 Liberty League football standings
	Conf.			Overall
Team	W		L	W		L
No. 21 Hobart $^	7	–	0	9	–	2
Union (NY)	6	–	1	6	–	3
RPI	4	–	3	5	–	4
Rochester (NY)	3	–	4	4	–	6
St. Lawrence	3	–	4	4	–	6
Merchant Marine	3	–	4	3	–	7
WPI	2	–	5	5	–	5
Coast Guard	0	–	7	1	–	8
$ – Conference champion; ^ – NCAA Division III playoff participant; Rankings from D3football.com

2004 Michigan Intercollegiate Athletic Association football standings
	Conf.			Overall
Team	W		L	W		L
Alma $^	6	–	1	8	–	3
Olivet	5	–	2	8	–	2
Albion	5	–	2	7	–	3
Hope	5	–	2	6	–	4
Adrian	3	–	4	6	–	4
Tri-State *	2	–	5	2	–	8
Wisconsin Lutheran	2	–	5	2	–	8
Kalamazoo	0	–	7	1	–	9
$ – Conference champion; ^ – NCAA Division III playoff participant; * – Provisional NCAA Division III member

2004 Middle Atlantic Conference football standings
	Conf.			Overall
Team	W		L	W		L
No. 11 Delaware Valley $^	9	–	0	12	–	1
Moravian	7	–	2	7	–	4
Albright	6	–	3	8	–	3
Wilkes	6	–	3	6	–	4
Widener	5	–	4	6	–	4
King's (PA)	4	–	5	4	–	6
Fairleigh Dickinson–Florham	3	–	6	4	–	6
Lebanon Valley	3	–	6	4	–	6
Susquehanna	3	–	6	4	–	6
Lycoming	3	–	6	3	–	7
Juniata	1	–	8	1	–	9
$ – Conference champion; ^ – NCAA Division III playoff participant; Rankings from D3football.com

2004 Midwest Conference football standings
	Conf.			Overall
Team	W		L	W		L
No. 22 St. Norbert $^	9	–	0	9	–	2
Monmouth (IL)	8	–	1	9	–	1
Lake Forest	7	–	2	8	–	2
Grinnell	5	–	4	6	–	4
Illinois College	5	–	4	6	–	4
Ripon	4	–	5	5	–	5
Carroll (WI)	3	–	6	3	–	7
Beloit	2	–	7	3	–	7
Lawrence	1	–	8	2	–	8
Knox	1	–	8	1	–	9
$ – Conference champion; ^ – NCAA Division III playoff participant; Rankings from D3football.com

2004 Minnesota Intercollegiate Athletic Conference football standings
	Conf.					Overall
Team	W		L		T	W		L		T
No. 9 Concordia–Moorhead $^	8	–	0	–	0	11	–	1	–	0
St. Thomas (MN)	6	–	2	–	0	7	–	2	–	0
Saint John's (MN)	6	–	2	–	0	7	–	3	–	0
St. Olaf	5	–	3	–	0	7	–	3	–	0
Bethel (MN)	5	–	3	–	0	6	–	4	–	0
Gustavus Adolphus	2	–	6	–	0	2	–	8	–	0
Augsburg	2	–	6	–	0	2	–	8	–	0
Hamline	1	–	7	–	0	3	–	7	–	0
Carleton	1	–	7	–	0	2	–	8	–	0
$ – Conference champion; ^ – NCAA Division III playoff participant; Rankings from D3football.com

2004 New England Football Conference standings
	Conf.			Overall
Team	W		L	W		L
Bogan Division
Fitchburg State xy	6	–	0	8	–	4
Bridgewater State	4	–	2	6	–	3
Westfield State	4	–	2	5	–	4
Worcester State	3	–	3	6	–	4
Maine Maritime	3	–	3	3	–	6
Massachusetts Maritime	1	–	5	1	–	8
Framingham State	0	–	6	0	–	9
Boyd Division
Curry xy$^	5	–	1	9	–	2
Endicott x	5	–	1	6	–	4
UMass Dartmouth	4	–	2	7	–	4
Western New England	3	–	3	5	–	4
Nichols	3	–	3	4	–	6
Salve Regina	1	–	6	2	–	8
MIT	0	–	6	2	–	7
Championship: Curry 17, Fitchburg State 7
$ – Conference champion; x – Division champion/co-champions; y – Championship game participant; ^ – NCAA Division III playoff participant

2004 New England Small College Athletic Conference football standings
	Conf.			Overall
Team	W		L	W		L
Trinity (CT) $	8	–	0	8	–	0
Amherst	6	–	2	6	–	2
Colby	6	–	2	6	–	2
Williams	6	–	2	6	–	2
Middlebury	4	–	4	4	–	4
Wesleyan	3	–	5	3	–	5
Bates	2	–	6	2	–	6
Bowdoin	2	–	6	2	–	6
Tufts	2	–	6	2	–	6
Hamilton	1	–	7	1	–	7
$ – Conference champion

2004 New Jersey Athletic Conference football standings
	Conf.			Overall
Team	W		L	W		L
Rowan $^	6	–	0	10	–	3
TCNJ	5	–	1	7	–	2
Cortland	4	–	2	5	–	4
Montclair State	2	–	4	4	–	4
Western Connecticut	2	–	4	5	–	5
Kean	1	–	5	2	–	8
William Paterson	1	–	5	2	–	8
$ – Conference champion; ^ – NCAA Division III playoff participant

2004 North Coast Athletic Conference football standings
	Conf.			Overall
Team	W		L	W		L
No. 10 Wooster $^	7	–	0	11	–	1
Wittenberg	5	–	2	7	–	3
Ohio Wesleyan	5	–	2	5	–	5
Denison	4	–	3	6	–	4
Wabash	4	–	3	6	–	4
Allegheny	4	–	3	5	–	5
Earlham	3	–	4	4	–	6
Kenyon	2	–	5	2	–	8
Oberlin	1	–	6	1	–	9
Hiram	0	–	7	0	–	10
$ – Conference champion; ^ – NCAA Division III playoff participant; Rankings from D3football.com

2004 Northwest Conference football standings
	Conf.			Overall
Team	W		L	W		L
No. 1 Linfield $^	5	–	0	13	–	0
No. 23 Willamette ^	4	–	1	7	–	4
Whitworth	3	–	2	7	–	2
Pacific Lutheran	2	–	3	6	–	3
Puget Sound	1	–	4	5	–	4
Lewis & Clark	0	–	5	1	–	8
$ – Conference champion; ^ – NCAA Division III playoff participant; Rankings from D3football.com

2004 Ohio Athletic Conference football standings
	Conf.			Overall
Team	W		L	W		L
No. 3 Mount Union $^	9	–	0	12	–	1
No. 19 Ohio Northern	7	–	2	8	–	2
Capital	6	–	3	7	–	3
John Carroll	6	–	3	6	–	4
Baldwin–Wallace	5	–	4	6	–	4
Marietta	5	–	4	5	–	4
Otterbein	3	–	6	4	–	6
Wilmington (OH)	3	–	6	3	–	7
Muskingum	1	–	8	1	–	9
Heidelberg	0	–	9	0	–	10
$ – Conference champion; ^ – NCAA Division III playoff participant; Rankings from D3football.com

2004 Old Dominion Athletic Conference football standings
	Conf.			Overall
Team	W		L	W		L
No. 17 Bridgewater $^	6	–	0	8	–	3
Hampden–Sydney	5	–	1	8	–	2
Washington and Lee	4	–	2	6	–	4
Emory & Henry	3	–	3	4	–	6
Randolph–Macon	2	–	4	3	–	7
Guilford	1	–	5	1	–	9
Catholic University	0	–	6	0	–	10
$ – Conference champion; ^ – NCAA Division III playoff participant; Rankings from D3football.com

2004 Presidents' Athletic Conference football standings
	Conf.			Overall
Team	W		L	W		L
No. 8 Washington & Jefferson $^	5	–	0	12	–	1
Thiel	4	–	1	7	–	3
Waynesburg	3	–	2	7	–	3
Westminster (PA)	2	–	3	5	–	5
Grove City	1	–	4	3	–	7
Bethany (WV)	0	–	5	1	–	9
$ – Conference champion; ^ – NCAA Division III playoff participant; Rankings from D3football.com

2004 Southern California Intercollegiate Athletic Conference football standings
	Conf.			Overall
Team	W		L	W		L
No. 7 Occidental $^	6	–	0	10	–	2
Cal Lutheran	4	–	2	6	–	3
La Verne	3	–	3	4	–	5
Pomona-Pitzer	3	–	3	4	–	5
Redlands	3	–	3	4	–	5
Claremont-Mudd-Scripps	1	–	5	2	–	7
Whittier	1	–	5	2	–	7
$ – Conference champion; ^ – NCAA Division III playoff participant; Rankings from D3football.com

2004 Southern Collegiate Athletic Conference football standings
	Conf.			Overall
Team	W		L	W		L
No. 14 Trinity (TX) $^	6	–	0	9	–	2
DePauw	5	–	1	8	–	2
Rhodes	3	–	3	5	–	5
Millsaps	3	–	3	4	–	5
Centre	2	–	4	4	–	6
Rose–Hulman	1	–	5	4	–	6
Sewanee	1	–	5	2	–	8
$ – Conference champion; ^ – NCAA Division III playoff participant; Rankings from D3football.com

2004 University Athletic Association football standings
	Conf.			Overall
Team	W		L	W		L
Washington University $	3	–	0	6	–	4
Case Western Reserve	2	–	1	5	–	5
Carnegie Mellon	1	–	2	6	–	4
Chicago	0	–	3	3	–	6
$ – Conference champion

2004 Upper Midwest Athletic Conference football standings
	Conf.			Overall
Team	W		L	W		L
North
Martin Luther x	6	–	1	6	–	3
Northwestern (MN) x	6	–	1	6	–	5
Minnesota Morris	4	–	3	5	–	5
Crown	2	–	5	2	–	7
Trinity Bible	0	–	7	0	–	9
South
Westminster (MO) x	6	–	1	6	–	3
Rockford	5	–	2	7	–	3
Blackburn	3	–	4	3	–	7
Principia	2	–	5	3	–	6
Maranatha Baptist	1	–	6	3	–	6
x – Division champion/co-champions

2004 USA South Athletic Conference football standings
	Conf.			Overall
Team	W		L	W		L
No. 16 Christopher Newport +^	5	–	1	9	–	3
Shenandoah +^	5	–	1	7	–	4
Methodist	4	–	2	7	–	3
North Carolina Wesleyan	3	–	3	4	–	4
Averett	2	–	4	6	–	4
Ferrum	1	–	5	4	–	6
Greensboro	1	–	5	2	–	8
+ – Conference co-champions; ^ – NCAA Division III playoff participant; Rankings from D3football.com

2004 Wisconsin Intercollegiate Athletic Conference football standings
	Conf.			Overall
Team	W		L	W		L
No. 13 Wisconsin–La Crosse $^	5	–	2	7	–	4
Wisconsin–Eau Claire	4	–	3	7	–	3
No. 25 Wisconsin–Whitewater	4	–	3	7	–	3
Wisconsin–Stevens Point	4	–	3	6	–	4
Wisconsin–Platteville	3	–	4	6	–	4
Wisconsin–Stout	3	–	4	5	–	4
Wisconsin–River Falls	3	–	4	3	–	7
Wisconsin–Oshkosh	2	–	5	5	–	5
$ – Conference champion; ^ – NCAA Division III playoff participant; Rankings from D3football.com

2004 NCAA Division III independents football records
	Conf.			Overall
Team	W		L	W		L
Mount Ida		–		6	–	2
Maryville (TN)		–		5	–	4
Chapman		–		4	–	5
Huntingdon		–		4	–	5
Thomas More		–		4	–	6
Colorado College		–		2	–	7
Husson		–		2	–	7
Menlo		–		1	–	7
Macalester		–		1	–	8
Plymouth State		–		1	–	8
Chowan		–		1	–	9

== Conference champions ==
Conference champions
- American Southwest Conference – Hardin–Simmons
- Atlantic Central Football Conference – Salisbury
- Centennial Conference – Dickinson, Franklin & Marshall, Johns Hopkins, McDaniel, and Muhlenberg
- College Conference of Illinois and Wisconsin – Carthage and Wheaton (IL)
- Empire 8 Conference – Ithaca and St. John Fisher
- Heartland Collegiate Athletic Conference – Mount St. Joseph
- Illini-Badger Football Conference – Aurora, Concordia (WI), and Lakeland
- Iowa Intercollegiate Athletic Conference – Coe and Wartburg
- Liberty League – Hobart
- Michigan Intercollegiate Athletic Association – Alma
- Middle Atlantic Conference – Delaware Valley
- Midwest Conference – St. Norbert
- Minnesota Intercollegiate Athletic Conference – Concordia–Moorhead
- New England Football Conference – Fitchburg State (Bogan Division), Curry and Endicott (Boyd Division)
  - Championship Game: Curry 17, Fitchburg State 7
- New England Small College Athletic Conference – Trinity (CT)
- New Jersey Athletic Conference – Rowan
- North Coast Athletic Conference – Wooster
- Northwest Conference – Linfield
- Ohio Athletic Conference – Mount Union
- Old Dominion Athletic Conference – Bridgewater
- Presidents' Athletic Conference – Washington & Jefferson
- Southern California Intercollegiate Athletic Conference – Occidental
- Southern Collegiate Athletic Conference – DePauw and Trinity (TX)
- University Athletic Association – Washington–Saint Louis
- Upper Midwest Athletic Conference – Westminster (MO)
- USA South Athletic Conference – Christopher Newport and Shenandoah
- Wisconsin Intercollegiate Athletic Conference – Wisconsin–La Crosse

== Postseason ==
The 2004 NCAA Division III Football Championship playoffs were the 32nd annual single-elimination tournament to determine the national champion of men's NCAA Division III college football. The championship Stagg Bowl game was held at Salem Football Stadium in Salem, Virginia for the 12th time. This was the last bracket to feature 28 teams before expanding to 32 teams in 2005.

=== Playoff bracket ===
First Round; Campus Sites
UW–La Crosse	37
St. Norbert	23
Occidental	28
Willamette	14
Concordia–Moorhead	28
Wartburg	14
Hobart	35
Curry	16
St. John Fisher	31
Muhlenberg	3
Delaware Valley	21
Shenandoah	17
Mary Hardin–Baylor	32
Trinity (TX)	13
Christopher Newport	35
Salisbury	24
Wash. & Jefferson	55**
Bridgewater (VA)	48
Wheaton (IL)	31
Mount St. Joseph	7
Carthage	31
Alma	28
Wooster	41
Aurora	34

Second Round; Campus Sites
Linfield	52
UW–La Crosse	14
Occidental	42
Concordia–Moorhead	40
Rowan	45
Hobart	14
St. John Fisher	20
Delaware Valley	26
Hardin–Simmons	28
Mary Hardin–Baylor	42
Christopher Newport	14
Wash. & Jefferson	24
Mount Union	27
Wheaton (IL)	6
Carthage	14
Wooster	7

Quarterfinals; Campus Sites
Linfield	56
Occidental	27
Rowan	56
Delaware Valley	7
Mary Hardin–Baylor	52
Wash. & Jefferson	16
Mount Union	38
Carthage	20

Semifinals; Campus Sites
Linfield	52
Rowan	0
Mary Hardin–Baylor	38
Mount Union	35

National Championship Game; Salem Football Stadium; Salem, Virginia
Linfield	28
Mary Hardin–Baylor	21

* Overtime

== Final D3football.com Poll ==
Team	Final Record	Points
1. Linfield (25)	13–0	625
2. Mary Hardin–Baylor	13–2	600
3. Mount Union	12–1	571
4. Hardin–Simmons	10–1	501
5. Carthage	11–2	491
6. Rowan	10–3	488
7. Occidental	10–2	463
8. Washington & Jefferson	12–1	447
9. Concordia–Moorhead	11–1	429
10. Wooster	11–1	397
11. Delaware Valley	12–1	363
12. Wheaton (Ill.)	10–2	339
13. Wisconsin–La Crosse	7–4	320
14. Trinity (TX)	9–2	281
15. St. John Fisher	10–2	262
16. Christopher Newport	9–3	248
17. Bridgewater (Va.)	8–3	200
18. Salisbury	10–1	195
19. Ohio Northern	8–2	165
20. Ithaca	9–2	163
21. Hobart	9–2	95
22. St. Norbert	9–2	80
23. Willamette	7–4	71
24. Wartburg	8–3	53
25. Wisconsin–Whitewater	7–3	48

Others receiving votes: Mount St. Joseph 39, Trinity (CT) 33, Alma 31, Wisconsin–Eau Claire 30, Whitworth 17, Texas Lutheran 17, Aurora 16, Augustana (Ill.) 16, Muhlenberg 14, Johns Hopkins 12, Springfield 9, Shenandoah 9, Hampden–Sydney 9, Moravian 8, Albright 3, Capital 2, Waynesburg 1, TCNJ 1, Curry 1, McDaniel 1.

== Awards ==
Gagliardi Trophy: Rocky Myers, Wesley (DE)

AFCA Coach of the Year: Jay Locey, Linfield

AFCA Regional Coach of the Year: Region 1: Chuck Priore, Trinity College (CT) Region 2: G. A. Mangus, Delaware Valley College Region 3: Jimmie Keeling, Hardin–Simmons University Region 4: Tim Rucks, Carthage College Region 5: Terry Horan, Concordia–Moorhead College

== See also ==
- 2004 NCAA Division I-A football season
- 2004 NCAA Division I-AA football season
- 2004 NCAA Division II football season
