= Rowan Profs football =

- First season: 1947
- Head coach: Pat Ruley; 2nd season, 14–6–1 (.690)
- Location: Glassboro, New Jersey
- Stadium: Coach Richard Wackar Stadium (capacity: 5,000)
- NCAA division: Division III
- Conference: NJAC
- Colors: Brown and gold

Conference championships
- 1972, 1974, 1975, 1976, 1977, 1983, 1991, 1992, 1993, 1995, 1997, 2001, 2002, 2004, 2005, 2006, 2010, 2013, 2014
- Rivalries: Montclair State (Breakfast Bowl)
- Marching band: Pride of the Profs
- Website: rowanathletics.com

The Rowan Profs football team represents Rowan University, located in Glassboro, New Jersey, in NCAA Division III college football.

The Profs, who began playing football in 1947, compete as members of the New Jersey Athletic Conference.

Rowan have finished as runners-up in the NCAA Division III football championship five times: 1993, 1995, 1996, 1998, and 1999. During this time, the Profs were led by future Delaware, Sam Houston, and Temple coach, K.C. Keeler.

== History ==
=== Conferences ===
- 1947–1968: Independent
- 1969–1984: New Jersey State Athletic Conference
- 1985–present: New Jersey Athletic Conference
