= List of Wheaton Thunder head football coaches =

The Wheaton Thunder football program is a college football team that represents Wheaton College as a member of the College Conference of Illinois and Wisconsin CCIW) at the NCAA Division III level. The team has had 22 head coaches since its first recorded game in 1900. The team's current coach is Jesse Scott. who took the position in 2020.

== Key ==
Key to symbols in coaches list
General		Overall		Conference		Postseason (Note: Although the first Rose Bowl Game was played in 1902, it has been continuously played since the 1916 game, and is recognized as the oldest bowl game by the NCAA. "—" indicates any season prior to 1916 when postseason games were not played.)	
No.	Order of coaches (Note: A running total of the number of head coaches, with coaches who served separate tenures being counted only once. Interim head coaches are represented with "Int" and are not counted in the running total. "—" indicates the team played but either without a coach or no coach is on record. "X" indicates an interim year without play.)	GC	Games coached	CW	Conference wins	PW	Postseason wins
DC	Division championships	OW	Overall wins	CL	Conference losses	PL	Postseason losses
CC	Conference championships	OL	Overall losses	CT	Conference ties	PT	Postseason ties
NC	National championships	OT	Overall ties (Note: Overtime rules in college football were introduced in 1996, making ties impossible in the period since.)	C%	Conference winning percentage		
†	Elected to the College Football Hall of Fame	O%	Overall winning percentage (Note: When computing the win–loss percentage, a tie counts as half a win and half a loss.)				

== Coaches ==
Statistics correct as of the end of the 2025 college football season.

No.	Name	Term	GC	OW	OL	OT	O%	CW	CL	CT	C%	PW	PL	CCs	NCs	Awards
—	No coach	1900, 1912, 1917	9	2	7	0	.222	—	—	—		—	—	—	—	
1	Jasper Turnbell	1914–1915	13	6	7	0	.462	—	—	—		—	—	—	—	
2	Bob Robinson	1916	8	3	5	0	.375	—	—	—		—	—	—	—	
3	Rex Gary	1919–1920	12	5	6	1	.458	—	—	—		—	—	—	—	
4	Robert S. Woodruff	1921	8	6	2	0	.750	—	—	—		—	—	—	—	
5	Jack Conley	1922–1924	21	8	11	2	.429	3	6	1	.350	—	—	—	—	
6	Dave Gillespie	1925	8	1	7	0	.125	1	5	0	.167	—	—	—	—	
7	Ed Coray	1926–1928	22	5	14	3	.295	0	7	2	.111	—	—	—	—	
8	Vic Gustafson	1929–1934	46	14	27	5	.359	3	20	4	.154	—	—	—	—	
9	Wendell Smith	1935	8	2	5	1	.313	1	2	1	.375	—	—	—	—	
10	Mysterious Walker	1936–1939	29	11	14	4	.448	8	5	3	.594	—	—	—	—	
11	Harvey Chrouser	1940–1941, 1946–1960	146	104	34	8	.740	68	10	2	.863	—	—	9	—	
12	Albert Graff	1942	9	5	3	1	.611	—	—	—		—	—	—	—	
13	Carl E. DeVries	1943–1945	19	11	5	3	.658	—	—	—		—	—	—	—	
14	Jack Swartz	1961–1968	71	41	30	0	.577	—	—	—		—	—	—	—	
15	Mal Pearson	1969–1970	18	4	13	1	.250	1	6	1	.188	—	—	—	—	
16	Gary Taylor	1971–1972	18	2	16	0	.111	2	14	0	.125	—	—	—	—	
17	Dewey King	1973–1979	63	29	34	0	.460	26	30	0	.464	—	—	—	—	
18	Clift Schimmels	1980	9	2	7	0	.222	1	7	0	.125	—	—	—	—	
19	Jim Rexilius	1981	9	2	7	0	.222	1	7	0	.125	—	—	—	—	
20	J. R. Bishop	1982–1995	128	84	43	1	.660	70	37	1	.653	1	1	1	—	
21	Mike Swider	1996–2019	261	209	52	0	.801	140	34	0	.805	15	11	9	—	
22	Jesse Scott	2020–present	60	48	12	0	.800	40	5	0	.889	6	4	0	—	
