= Clift =

Clift is a surname and given name which may refer to:

== Surname ==
- Bill Clift (1762–1840), British jockey
- Charmian Clift (1923–1969), Australian writer and essayist during the mid 20th century
- David Horace Clift (1907–1972), American librarian, chief executive of the American Library Association
- Denison Clift (1885–1961), American screenwriter and film director
- Eleanor Clift (born 1940), American political reporter, television pundit, author
- Harlond Clift (1912–1992), American Major League Baseball player
- Jack Clift (born 1955), American composer and music oroducer
- James A. Clift (1857–1923), lawyer, insurance agent and politician in Newfoundland
- James Shannon Clift (1814–1873), English-born merchant and politician in Newfoundland
- Jean Dalby Clift, Episcopal priest and pastoral counsellor
- Joseph W. Clift (1837–1908), American politician
- Ken Clift (1916–2009), Australian soldier and author, recipient of the Distinguished Conduct Medal
- Malcolm Clift, Australian former professional rugby league footballer and coach
- Mia Clift (born 2004), Australian snowboarder
- Montgomery Clift (1920–1966), American film and stage actor
- Paddy Clift (1953–1996), Zimbabwean educated first class cricketer
- Pat Studdy-Clift, Australian author specializing in historical fiction and non-fiction
- Paul Clift (born 1978), Australian composer
- Peter Clift (born 1966), British marine geologist and geophysicist
- Robert Clift (born 1962), former field hockey player
- Robert Clift, Jr. (1824–1859), American soldier and early settler in California
- Roland Clift (born 1942), British chemical engineer and professor
- Wallace Clift (1926–2018), American priest and author, professor emeritus at the University of Denver
- William Clift, (1775–1849), British naturalist

== Given name ==
- Clift Andrus (1890–1968), United States Army major general
- Clift Chandler (1887–1967), American politician
- Clift Schimmels (died 2001), American football coach and Baptist speaker and educator
- Clift Tsuji (1941–2016), American politician
