= Gary Taylor =

Gary Taylor may refer to:

- Gary Taylor (strongman) (born 1961), British winner of the 1993 World's Strongest Man competition
- Gary Taylor (scholar) (born 1953), American professor and writer
- Gary L. Taylor (born 1938), American district court judge
- Gary Taylor (singer), American singer, songwriter and producer
- Gene Taylor (Mississippi politician), American politician

Gary Taylor (politician), American politician

- Gary Taylor (journalist) (born 1947), American journalist
- Gary Taylor (baseball) American baseball player
- Gary Taylor (American football), American football coach

== See also ==
- Gareth Taylor (born 1973), English-Welsh footballer
