= David Gillespie (disambiguation) =

David Gillespie (born 1964) is an Australian rugby league player.

David or Dave Gillespie may also refer to:

- David Gillespie (surveyor) (1774–1829), American land surveyor, military officer and politician
- David Gillespie (Australian politician) (born 1957), Australian politician and gastroenterologist
- David Gillespie (murder victim) (died 2004), victim in the House of Blood murders
- David Gillespie (author), Australian author of self-help books
- Dave Gillespie (Australian footballer) (1887–1917), Australian rules footballer
- Dave Gillespie (rugby union) (1934–2025), New Zealand rugby union player
- Dave Gillespie (American football), American football coach
