= Bob Woodruff (disambiguation) =

Bob Woodruff (b. 1961) is an American television journalist.

Bob Woodruff is also the name of:

- Bob Woodruff (American football) (1916–2001), American college football player and coach
- Bob Woodruff (singer) (born 1961), American country music singer and songwriter

== See also ==
- Robert Woodruff (disambiguation)
