= John Conley =

John Conley may refer to:

- John Conley (American football) (born 1950), former American football player
- John Conley (Wisconsin politician) (born 1828), American politician, member of the Wisconsin State Assembly
- John D. Conley (1843–1926), American professor in geology and physics at the University of Wyoming; see John D. Conley House
- John D. Conley House, in Laramie, Wyoming, US, on the National Register of Historic Places
- John Conley, bassist in the Australian jazz band Galapagos Duck
- John Conley, musician in the American Indie pop band Holiday Flyer
- John Conley, corporal in UPR, killed in The Troubles in Garvagh

== See also ==
- John Conlee, American country music singer
- Jack Conley (disambiguation)
