= Coray =

Coray may refer to:

== People ==
- Artúr Coray (1881–1909), Hungarian track and field athlete
- Coray Colina
- Ed Coray (1901–1993), American coach
- Hans Coray (1906–1991), Swiss artist
- Ira Coray Abbott, American soldier
- Martha Jane Knowlton Coray (1821–1881)

== Places ==
- Coray, Finistère, France
- San Francisco de Coray, Honduras
