= James Clift =

James Clift may refer to:

- James Shannon Clift (1814–1877), merchant and political figure in Newfoundland
- James A. Clift (1857–1923), lawyer, insurance agent and political figure in Newfoundland
