= Conley House =

Conley House may refer to:

- John D. Conley House, a two-story Victorian dwelling of wooden frame construction in Laramie, Wyoming, listed on the NRHP in Wyoming
- Sanford F. Conley House, an ornate eighteenth-century residence in Columbia, Missouri, listed on the NRHP in Missouri
