= Wendell Smith =

Wendell Smith may refer to:

- Wendell Smith (coach) (1908–1994), American football and track and field coach
- Wendell Smith (sportswriter) (1914–1972), American baseball writer
- Wendell Smith (actor) (fl. 1977–2010), Canadian actor
