= Jack Conley =

Jack Conley may refer to:

- Jack Conley (actor) (born 1958), American actor
- Jack Conley (English footballer) (1920–1991), English footballer
- Jack Conley (Australian rules footballer) (1920–2008)
- Jack Conley (American football), American football coach in the United States

== See also ==
- John Conley (disambiguation)
