= Your Worst Nightmare =

- Genre: Television documentary
- Narrated by: D.C. Goode
- Composer: Discovery Music Source
- Country of origin: United States
- No. of seasons: 6
- No. of episodes: 58

Production
- Executive producers: Tom Cappello; Alana Goldstein; Anne Garofalo Paterno
- Producers: Alissa Collins; Joseph Greco
- Running time: 43 minutes (excluding commercials)
- Production company: Crazy Legs Productions

Original release
- Network: Investigation Discovery
- Release: October 22, 2014 – September 21, 2020

Your Worst Nightmare is an American television documentary series on Investigation Discovery that debuted on October 22, 2014. The show is a 60-minute narrated true crime show blending reenactments of key events with commentary from law enforcement, criminal justice professionals, friends and family of the victims, and occasionally, the victims themselves.

== Episodes ==
Season	Episodes	Originally released	
Season	Episodes	First released	Last released
1	6	October 22, 2014	November 26, 2014
2	10	November 11, 2015	January 13, 2016
3	10	December 3, 2016	February 18, 2017
4	10	November 17, 2017	February 3, 2018
5	10	January 1, 2019	March 15, 2019
6	12	July 6, 2020	September 21, 2020

=== Season 1 (2014) ===
No. overall	No. in season	Title	Original release date
1	1	"Somebody's Watching"	October 22, 2014
Sandy Jeffers does she know that one man is completely obsessed with her. When she comes face to face with her stalker in Knoxville, Tennessee the outcome is fatal.
2	2	"When the Lights Go Out"	October 29, 2014
Cassie Jo Stoddart is terrorized by classmates Brian Draper and Torey Adamcik while house sitting.
3	3	"Water Foul"	November 5, 2014
Martha Brailsford goes sailing in Salem, Massachusetts with an acquaintance and never returns, causing her family to suspect the worst.
4	4	"Horror in the Heartland"	November 12, 2014
The bodies of Annette Cooper and Todd Schultz are found hacked to pieces in small town Logan, Ohio and the case goes unsolved for 25 years.
5	5	"The Bad Son"	November 19, 2014
Matthew Heikkila shoots his parents and then terrorizes his girlfriend.
6	6	"The Killer Beside Me"	November 26, 2014
Janet Overton dies under suspicious circumstance after suffering from an undiagnosed illness.

=== Season 2 (2015-2016) ===
No. overall	No. in season	Title	Original release date
7	1	"Bump in the Night"	November 11, 2015
Two sisters hold a séance to contact their mother's spirit and strange things begin to happen around the house. They fail to realize that they are being watched by Daniel LaPlante.
8	2	"Murder House"	November 18, 2015
The story of John List, who murdered his family in 1971 New Jersey, then disappears for almost two decades.
9	3	"Unexpected Company"	November 25, 2015
Retirees Reggie and Carol Sumner go missing after a visit from a former neighbor Tiffany Cole.
10	4	"While She Was Sleeping"	December 2, 2015
Denise and her husband believe they know who broke into their home until she comes face to face with the actual intruder: Harvey Miguel Robinson.
11	5	"There's No Place Like Home"	December 9, 2015
Sarah Harris finds an intruder in her home and when her father arrives, he must take extreme action to save both their lives.
12	6	"Psycho for Love"	December 16, 2015
Chanin Starbuck comes home to find the house vandalized and fears it's due to her online dating.
13	7	"Neighbor From Hell"	December 23, 2015
Lois Pearson turns down a date with a neighbor and thinks the encounter is over, but years later, finds he harbors animosity towards her.
14	8	"Fight or Flight"	December 30, 2015
A flight attendant breaks her own rule of traveling alone just once and pays the ultimate price. Jeffrey Gorton
15	9	"High School Revenge"	January 6, 2016
Mary and Beth Stauffer are kidnapped by a Ming Sen Shiue just days before they're due to move to the Philippines. After seven weeks, they see their chance to escape alive.
16	10	"The Devil Went Down to Georgia"	January 13, 2016
Jerry Glaser believes someone is trying to kill him and takes his life into his own hands to protect himself and his family.

=== Season 3 (2016-2017) ===
No. overall	No. in season	Title	Original release date
17	1	"Primal Instincts"	December 3, 2016
On Mother's Day, first-time mother Tennyson Jacobson fights off a violent intruder during her daughter's nap time.
18	2	"Cabin in the Woods"	December 10, 2016
The Millers always thought something was off with their oldest son Steven, but they find out just how off he is with fatal consequences.
19	3	"A Night Alone"	December 17, 2016
College sophomore Gina Tenney discovers she has a stalker, then comes face to face with her tormentor and realizes she knows him.
20	4	"Secret Rage"	January 7, 2017
Sarah Wisnosky goes to college to have new experiences, but when she catches the eye of a flirty frat boy, she finds he's hiding a dark secret.
21	5	"Cooking with Fire"	January 14, 2017
After leaving a violent ex-husband and firing a problem employee, 21-year-old Cathy Whitehead is happy to build a life with the man of her dreams. A stranger shows up on her doorstep and she is soon caught up in a web of danger.
22	6	"Black Widow"	January 21, 2017
One month after becoming involved intimately with Catherine Mehaffey, Gary Taylor realizes he's made a terrible mistake.
23	7	"Blood in the Barn"	January 28, 2017
Frankie Cochran falls for handsome David Gehrard, then his behavior begins to alarm her and she realizes a secret from his past is dangerous.
24	8	"Domestic Disturbance"	February 4, 2017
With a new home and loving fiancé, single mom Lisa Filiaggi finally feels like luck is on her side, then trouble from her past comes back to haunt her.
25	9	"Into the Wild"	February 11, 2017
While out for a run in the Montana wilderness, 22-year-old college student Kari Swenson is taken prisoner by two mountain men. When she learns of their twisted plans for her, she'll do everything she can to escape or die trying.
26	10	"Shadow Walker"	February 18, 2017
Sandi Musk begins casually seeing Andy LeFleur, a much younger man, who becomes obsessed with her and when she tries to break off the relationship, finds her life is in danger.

=== Season 4 (2017-2018) ===
No. overall	No. in season	Title	Original release date
27	1	"Every Step You Take"	December 2, 2017
Dancer Jodi Sanderholm spends weeks practicing for her team's big performance in Arkansas City, Kansas but then vanishes a few hours before the event.
28	2	"He's Out There"	December 9, 2017
Teen Karen Slattery is brutally murdered while babysitting a neighbors' children, then the violent intruder vanishes without a trace, and the case goes cold till police links the case to Duane Owen.
29	3	"Midlife Crisis"	December 16, 2017
Deborah Houchin believes she's finally found the man of her dreams, then disappears and it takes the help of her coworkers to find out what happened.
30	4	"He Seems Perfect"	December 23, 2017
New York fashion designer Jenae Aragosa falls hard for bartender Trevor Frederick, when she sees a dark side come out, she realizes she may not make it out of the relationship alive.
31	5	"The One that Got Away"	December 30, 2017
Single mother Tracy Whitehead is starting to turn her life around when she falls for Joby Palczynzki, then his jealousy starts to overtake their relationship and she finds that she can't escape.
32	6	"Life on the Line"	January 6, 2018
Cousins Ana Franklin and Jennifer Holliday are traveling home to Lufkin, Texas late one night when terror strikes. Holliday is taken hostage by an unstable individual, but she manages to call a 911 operator, who will stop at nothing to save her.
33	7	"A Noise in the Night"	January 13, 2018
Sisters Bre and Kayli Lasley move into a perfect apartment in downtown Salt Lake City, unaware that a recent parolee lives nearby, then they cross paths with him in an explosive way.
34	8	"He's Coming for Me"	January 20, 2018
Twenty two year old Adriane Fields can't shake the feeling she's going to fall victim to a serial killer who is on the loose in Arlington, Texas. Crippled by fear, Fields moves across town, only to come face to face with her worst nightmare.
35	9	"Twisted Plan"	January 27, 2018
When Gail Spencer fails to show up for work in Macon, Georgia, her coworkers are concerned. During the investigation into her disappearance, the police find someone at work knows more than they are letting on.
36	10	"Home Invasion"	February 3, 2018
After separating from her husband of 13 years, 36 year old Julie Boyd suddenly finds her life in danger and will stop at nothing to keep herself and her three children safe.

=== Season 5 (2019) ===
No. overall	No. in season	Title	Original release date
37	1	"Locked Away"	January 1, 2019
When college graduate Anita Wooldridge goes missing from her parents’ home in Kokomo, Indiana, investigators must work fast to find her before it's too late.
38	2	"Play Dead"	January 11, 2019
Single mom Kaye Robinson turns away a late night stranger at her door and thinks the encounter is over, but has no idea the threat to her and her son is just beginning.
39	3	"Run For Your Life"	January 18, 2019
College student Micah Rine feels she has found the man of her dreams but after they marry, things begin to unravel. When her husband reports her missing after going on a run, take a closer look at their life in Bartlett, Tennessee.
40	4	"Never Let Go"	January 25, 2019
Karen Widdoss thinks she's rid of her possessive ex boyfriend, Leonard, but while dating someone new, she can't shake the feeling she's being stalked.
41	5	"Come With Me"	February 1, 2019
Jennifer Hitchcock moves in with Maurice Mason in Lincoln, Nebraska and begins to believe someone is watching her every move.
42	6	"One Last Goodbye"	February 9, 2019
Recently divorced Tanya Petro goes missing after meeting a new man. The police of Landers, California find that all isn't what it seems.
43	7	"Firestarter"	February 16, 2019
Audrey Mabry believes she's found the man of her dreams in NYPD detective Chris Hanney. They move to Tampa, Florida to start a new life and Audrey begins to realize Chris is lying about almost everything.
44	8	"Behind the Barn"	February 23, 2019
Twenty year old Kristy Ray is living at home and attending college when she is abducted by Charles Ray Crawford and the police turn to the FBI and the community to find Kristy before her time runs out.
45	9	"A Way Out"	March 2, 2019
The police soon realize the abduction of 13-year old Jessyca Mullenberg took meticulous planning and her abductor will go to any lengths to avoid being caught.
46	10	"Cruel Intentions"	March 15, 2019
Ashleigh Lindsey makes a terrible decision after meeting Josh Mahaffey.

=== Season 6 (2020) ===
No. overall	No. in season	Title	Original release date
47	1	"No End in Sight"	July 6, 2020
Debbie Puglisi is kidnapped from Newark, Delaware and held captive for nearly a week by a man who also kills her husband.
48	2	"Danger in Store"	July 13, 2020
Joi Partain falls for Jonathan Pearson, and believes he's truly in love with her. Instead, he turns out to be a control freak with the worst possible anger issues.
49	3	"The Watcher"	July 20, 2020
On a rare day off from work, Carrie Caudill and a friend embark on a well-deserved girl's night out. But out of nowhere, an unexpected confrontation puts Carrie on a dangerous collision course with a calculating and sadistic madman.
50	4	"He's Back"	July 27, 2020
After her mom gets mugged outside their New York City apartment, 16-year-old Natalie Purdie's parents decide it's safer for their daughter to go live with her grandma in Norfolk, Virginia. Despite her new surroundings, Natalie adapts quickly; she makes new friends and her talent even earns her a spot of her high school dance troupe. But when Natalie earns the opportunity to audition for her dream dance company back in New York, she double-downs on making dance her number one priority and she puts her social life on the back burner. But to Natalie's dismay, her focus on dance fuels a jealous fire in some of her closest relationships, igniting a streak of violence that won't be stopped until nearly twenty years later.
51	5	"No Escape"	August 3, 2020
When Peggy Klinke returns to school to pursue her dream of becoming a doctor, she catches the eye of fellow student, Patrick Kennedy. But their relationship eventually leads them down a terrifying path of jealousy, obsession, and murder.
52	6	"Heart of Darkness"	August 10, 2020
Devastated by personal loss, 25-year-old Heather Kelso finds a fresh start and falls fast for charismatic Gerry DeJesus. But jealousy and other friendships will ultimately drive a deadly wedge straight into the heart of their relationship.
53	7	"The Night Shift"	August 17, 2020
Single mother Barbara Nunn relocates to Davie, Florida, but she struggles to find her way. After she lands a job at a local diner, it appears her troubles are finally behind her. But then one night, a surprise confrontation with customers ends in murder.
54	8	"Never Saw It Coming"	August 24, 2020
When recently divorced, 30-year-old phlebotomist and aspiring physician's assistant Tammie Craycraft Smith picks up a waitress job to help make ends meet, she has no idea it will lead her to love. And, unbeknownst to her, that love will spark a series of events that ends in jealousy, rage, and murder.
55	9	"Living in Fear"	September 7, 2020
Michelle Cable, her partner Kevin, and her children Billy, Jessica, and Josh make for a tight-knit, happy family unit. But as she gets older, Jessica becomes more curious about her imprisoned biological father. Despite serious reservations, Michelle allows Jessica to reach out to him. But that leads to serious trouble when he starts to send threatening letters to Michelle. After Jessica's father escapes from prison, Michelle and her kids are forced into hiding, and the intense drama that follows drives a knife into Michelle and Kevin's relationship. Eventually, Michelle finds love again with an old family friend, James "Jitters" VanDivner. But Michelle's propensity for giving troubled souls second chances eventually comes back to haunt her.
56	10	"Root of All Evil"	September 7, 2020
Sheila Dates and her daughter Regina are more than blood relatives - they're best friends and roommates too. But one morning, their lives are irrevocably changed the moment two unexpected guests appear at their doorstep.
57	11	"The Grudge"	September 14, 2020
With its beautiful, sun-kissed beaches and vibrant social scene, Fort Lauderdale, Florida is the perfect place for 38-year-old outdoor enthusiast Christine Kent to call home. To pay her bills, the friendly, outgoing, single gal works as a doctor's assistant during the week and moonlights as a promotional and trade show model on weekends. But as she crosses paths with the public, Christine attracts attention - both good and bad. And by the time Christine realizes she's in grave danger, it's too late.
58	12	"Do You Love Me?"	September 21, 2020
For Jeanne Smith, love has always been a losing game. Despite her kind, generous heart, this devoted mother and grandmother's past is littered with failed marriages. And as much as she cherishes a close, nurturing bond with her daughters Marie and Anna, the absence of romance in her life leaves Jeanne longing for more. And she's not the only one with love woes; to Jeanne's dismay, Anna appears to have inherited her mother's bad taste in men with her own hard-drinking, volatile boyfriend. Nevertheless, Jeanne decides to give love another shot. After testing the waters of online dating, Jeanne strikes a match with nice guy Mike Iseman. But for Jeanne and her daughters, love will ultimately turn toxic and deadly.
