= Jeffrey Gorton =

American murderer and rapist (born 1962)

- Born: Jeffrey Wayne Gorton; November 1, 1962 (age 63)
- Height: 6 ft 0 in (183 cm)
- Convictions: Criminal Sexual Conduct-1st Deg; Homicide - Felony Murder; Homicide - Murder First Degree-Premeditated; Homicide - Felony Murder
- Penalty: Life imprisonment

Details
- Victims: 2
- Span of crimes: 1986–1991
- Country: United States
- State: Michigan
- Date apprehended: 2002
- Imprisoned at: Richard A. Handlon Correctional Facility, Michigan

Jeffrey Wayne Gorton (born November 1, 1962) is an American murderer and rapist, who was convicted in 2002 of the rape and murder of flight attendant Nancy Ludwig on February 17, 1991, at the (then) Hilton hotel in Romulus, Michigan. He later pleaded no contest to charges that he raped and murdered a professor and provost of the University of Michigan–Flint, Margarette Eby, on November 9, 1986.

It took until 2002 before the two rapes and murders were proved to be the work of one person by matching semen samples taken from the two crime scenes. Gorton had left a latent fingerprint at the Eby crime scene; when it was matched to him, the Michigan State Police learned the killer's identity. Gorton was then proven to be the rapist by matching the DNA of his semen with that of the samples taken from the two murder victims.

Gorton was sentenced to life imprisonment without parole.

The murders of both Margarette Eby and Nancy Ludwig by Gorton were depicted in the episode "Silk Stalkings" in the television series Forensic Files as well as in the Investigation Discovery television series Your Worst Nightmare in the episode "Fight or Flight" and The Lake Erie Murders episode “Heartbreak Hotel”.

== See also ==
- List of homicides in Michigan
