= Gary Taylor (American football) =

American sports coach (born c. 1939)

Biographical details
- Born: c. 1939

Playing career

Football
- 1961: Fresno State
- Position: Center

Coaching career (HC unless noted)

Football
- 1966: Antelope Valley (line)
- 1967–1970: Eastern New Mexico (OL)
- 1971–1972: Wheaton (IL)

Baseball
- 1975–1980: Wheaton (IL)

Wrestling
- 1967–1971: Eastern New Mexico

Head coaching record
- Overall: 2–16 (football); 54–77 (baseball)

Accomplishments and honors

Awards
- Baseball; CCIW Coach of the Year (1980)

Gary Taylor (born c. 1939) is an American former football, baseball, and wrestling coach. He served as the head football coach at Wheaton College in Wheaton, Illinois for two seasons, from 1971 to 1972, compiling a record of 2–16. Taylor was also the head baseball coach at Wheaton from 1976 to 1980, tallying a mark of 54–77.

Taylor was the line coach for the football team at Antelope Valley College in Lancaster, California before was hired, in 1967, as the head wrestling coach and offensive line coach for the football team at Eastern New Mexico University. He was also an assistant professor of health and education at Eastern New Mexico. In 1971, Taylor was named the head football coach at Wheaton, succeeding Mal Pearson. He resigned from that post in early 1973. Taylor was appointed head baseball coach at Wheaton in late 1975 to succeed Lee Pfund. He was named baseball Coach of the Year by the College Conference of Illinois and Wisconsin (CCIW) in 1980.

== Head coaching record ==
=== Football ===
Year	Team	Overall	Conference	Standing	Bowl/playoffs
Wheaton Crusaders (College Conference of Illinois and Wisconsin) (1971–1972)
1971	Wheaton	1–8	1–7	8th	
1972	Wheaton	1–8	1–7	8th	
Wheaton:		2–16	2–14		
Total:		2–16			

=== Baseball ===
Record table
Season	Team	Overall	Conference	Standing	Postseason
Wheaton Crusaders (College Conference of Illinois and Wisconsin) (1976–1980)
1976	Wheaton	6–22	3–13	T–8th	
1977	Wheaton	11–14	6–10	T–8th	
1978	Wheaton	9–16	5–9	7th	
1979	Wheaton	13–13	8–8	5th	
1980	Wheaton	15–12	11–5	2nd	
Wheaton:		54–77	33–45		
Total:		54–77			
