= Albert Graff =

American football coach

Coaching career (HC unless noted)
- 1942: Wheaton (IL)

Head coaching record
- Overall: 5–3–1

Albert Graff was an American football coach. He served as the head coach at Wheaton College in Wheaton, Illinois for one season, in 1942, compiling a record of 5–3–1.

== Head coaching record ==
Year	Team	Overall	Conference	Standing	Bowl/playoffs
Wheaton Crusaders (Independent) (1942)
1942	Wheaton	5–3–1			
Wheaton:		5–3–1			
Total:		5–3–1			
