= Bob Robinson (American football) =

American football and basketball coach

Coaching career (HC unless noted)

Football
- 1916: Wheaton (IL)

Basketball
- 1916–1917: Wheaton (IL)

Head coaching record
- Overall: 3–5 (football); 5–4 (basketball)

Robert Robinson was an American college football and college basketball coach. He was the head football coach at Wheaton College in Wheaton, Illinois, serving for one season in 1916 and compiling a record of 3–5. Robinson was also the head basketball coach at Wheaton for one season, in 1916–17, tallying a mark of 5–4.

== Head coaching record ==
=== Football ===
Year	Team	Overall	Conference	Standing	Bowl/playoffs
Wheaton Crusaders (Independent) (1916)
1916	Wheaton	3–5			
Wheaton:		3–5			
Total:		3–5			
