= Florence Violet McKenzie =

Australian electrical engineer (1890–1982)

Florence Violet McKenzie OBE
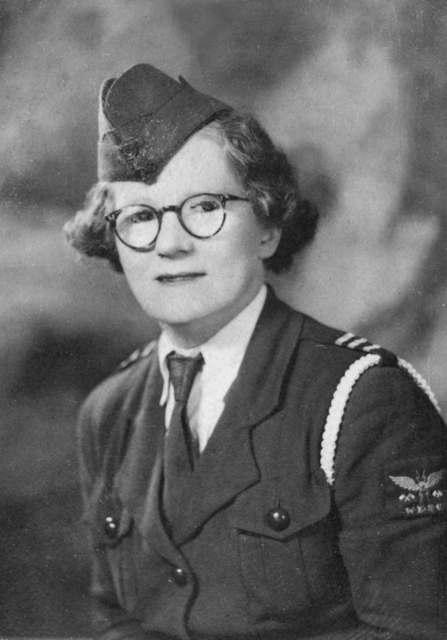
- McKenzie in uniform c. 1940
- Born: Florence Violet Granville; 28 September 1890; Melbourne, Australia
- Died: 23 May 1982 (aged 91); Sydney, Australia
- Other names: "Mrs Mac"; Violet Wallace
- Education: Sydney Technical College
- Occupation: Electrical engineer
- Known for: Founding the Women's Emergency Signalling Corps

Florence Violet McKenzie OBE (née Granville; 28 September 1890 – 23 May 1982), affectionately known as "Mrs Mac", was Australia's first female electrical engineer, founder of the Women's Emergency Signalling Corps (WESC) and lifelong promoter of technical education for women. She campaigned successfully to have some of her female trainees accepted into the all-male Navy, thereby originating the Women's Royal Australian Naval Service (WRANS). Some 12,000 servicemen passed through her signal instruction school in Sydney, acquiring skill in Morse code and visual signalling (flag semaphore and International Code of Signals).

She set up her own electrical contracting business in 1918, and apprenticed herself to it, in order to meet the requirements of the Diploma in Electrical Engineering at Sydney Technical College. Described at the time as Australia's "Mademoiselle Edison", in 1922 she became the first Australian woman to take out an amateur radio operator's licence. Through the 1920s and 1930s, her "Wireless Shop" in Sydney's Royal Arcade was renowned amongst Sydney radio experimenters and hobbyists. She founded The Wireless Weekly in 1922, established the Australian Electrical Association for Women in 1934, and wrote the first "all-electric cookbook" in 1936. She corresponded with Albert Einstein in the postwar years.

== Family and education ==
Florence Violet Granville was born in Melbourne on 28 September 1890 to George and Marie Annie (née Giles) Wallace. Other sources cite 1892 as her birth year. Before her marriage to Cecil McKenzie at the age of 34, she was known as Violet Wallace. On Violet's birth certificate, Annie's name was listed as "Annie Granville", after the listed father of her elder brother Walter, James Granville [or Greville]. No records confirm the existence of James. When Violet was two, the family moved to Austinmer, south of Sydney.

The siblings attended Thirroul Public School. Here little Violet already displayed both confidence and ability at a school entertainment in 1899 in recitation and singing.

"I went down to Technical College and saw the Head there, and he said, 'Oh, you can't come here and do engineering unless you're working at it'... I said, 'Well now, suppose I had an electrical engineering business and I'm working at it, would that be all right?' He said, 'Yes, if you produce proof.' So I went back and I had some cards printed with my name on, and electrical work, and got the paper and wrote down the ads, and read that a house in ... Undercliffe about 2 miles from the tram ... was asking for prices for putting in electric light and power... I went out there and nobody else was silly enough to go, so they gave me the job. ... I went back to Tech and took my card down and showed them the contract for the job, and they said, 'All right, you can start.'"

— Florence McKenzie

From a young age, Violet had an independent interest in electricity and invention. As she recalled in an oral history interview in 1979:

I used to play about with bells and buzzers and things around the house. My mother would sometimes say "Oh, come and help me find something, it's so dark in this cupboard" – she didn't have very good eyesight... So I'd get a battery and I'd hook a switch, and when she opened that cupboard door a light would come on... I started sort of playing with those things.

Violet later won a bursary to study at Sydney Girls' High School and completed her senior year in 1909, despite repeating a year due to ill health. She then enrolled in Sydney Teachers' College with the intention of becoming a mathematics teacher. Her elder brother had studied to become an electrical engineer in England while Violet was in high school, returning as she began her teaching diploma. In 1915 she passed Chemistry I and Geology I at the University of Sydney, then approached the Sydney Technical College in Ultimo to enrol in the Diploma of Electrical Engineering. By March 1922, she had won the diploma. In December 1923, McKenzie graduated from the Sydney Technical College. She later gave her Diploma – the first of its kind awarded in Australia to a woman – to the collection of the Powerhouse Museum, also in Ultimo.

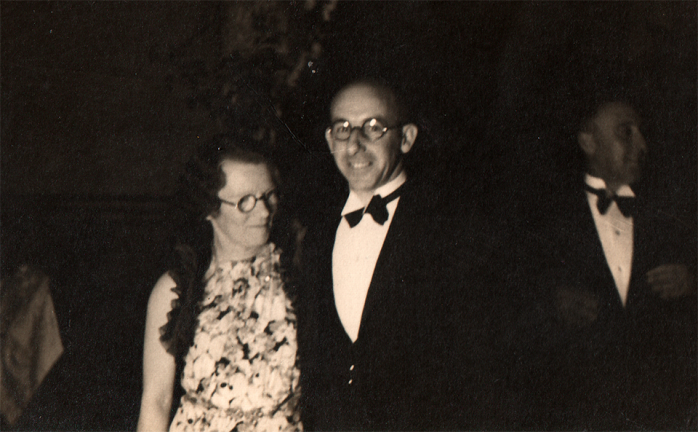
Violet McKenzie and husband Cecil McKenzie c1935

Cecil Roland McKenzie was a young electrical engineer employed by the Sydney County Council's Electricity Undertaking. He too was a radio enthusiast (callsign 2RJ from early 1922, but for receive only), and one of Violet's customers at the shop. They were married at the Church of St Philip in Auburn on New Year's Eve 1924. They built a house at 26 George Street, Greenwich Point complete with a wireless room in the attic. The house remains, but has been extensively renovated since the McKenzies lived there.

The McKenzies had a daughter on 9 June in 1926 (stillborn). There is no record of any other children. They sometimes took in the two sons of Violet's only sibling, Walter Reginald Wallace, from Melbourne. According to the Sands Directory these boys, Merton Reginald Wallace and Lindsay Gordon Wallace, later operated their own radio shop in Prahran, Melbourne.

== Early employment and interests ==
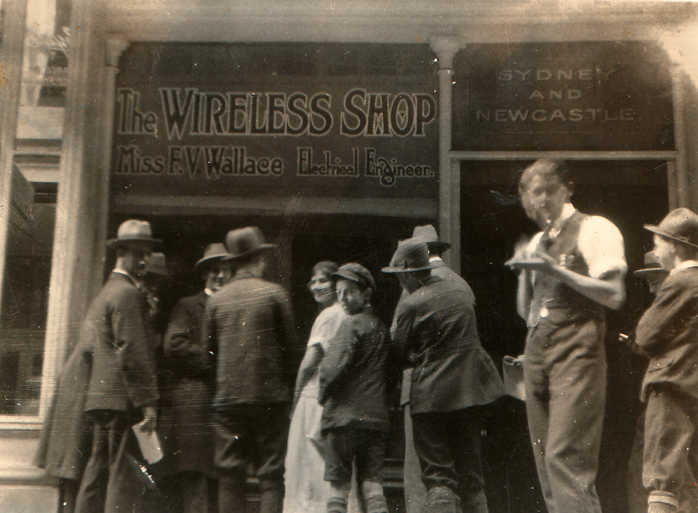
The Wireless Shop Miss F.V. Wallace, electrical engineer

Wallace taught mathematics at Armidale, before deciding to take a course in electrical engineering.

Throughout her studies, Wallace worked as an electrical contractor, installing electricity in private houses, such as that of politician Archdale Parkhill in Mosman, and in factories and commercial premises, including the Standard Steam Laundry on Dowling Street, Woolloomooloo.

Wallace was an enthusiastic wireless experimenter, being licensed to receive from late 1922 shortly after the commencement of the new Wireless Regulations of 1922 (callsign 2GA, later A2GA, OA2GA, VK2GA). She passed the Amateur Operator's Proficiency Certificate in 1925 (the first woman to do so) and thereafter was permitted to transmit. She held her licence continuously till the commencement of WW2 in 1939 when all Australian amateur transmitting privileges were withdrawn for the duration of the war. When amateur licensing resumed in 1946, her allocated callsign was VK2FV (the letters no doubt chosen by Violet for Florence Violet).

In 1922 Wallace opened "The Wireless Shop", after purchasing the entire stock of the wireless vendor who preceded her – billing itself as "the oldest radio shop in town" – at shop 18 in the Royal Arcade (which ran from George Street through to Pitt Street – replaced in the 1970s by the Hilton hotel). McKenzie later said it was schoolboys visiting her shop who first introduced her to Morse code. Australia's first weekly radio magazine was conceived at the shop by Wallace and three co-founders. "The Wireless Weekly" became the monthly magazine "Radio & Hobbies" (after a period operating in parallel), then "Radio, Television & Hobbies", and finally Electronics Australia, and remained in circulation until 2001.

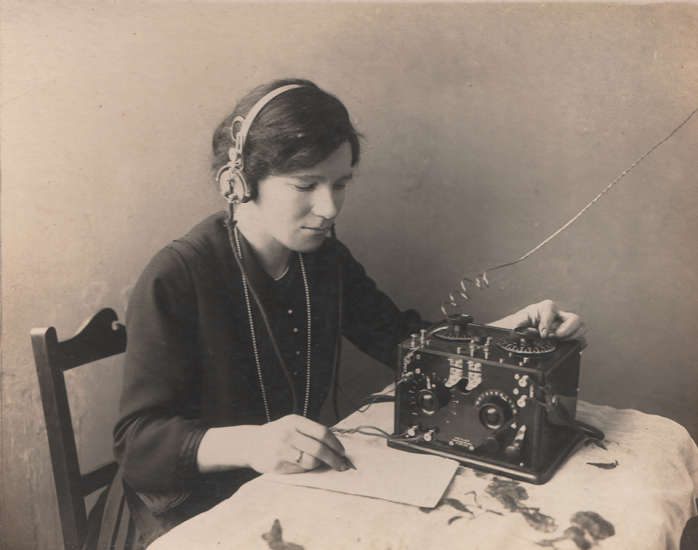
McKenzie working with the wireless radio c1922

In 1924 McKenzie became the only female member of the Wireless Institute of Australia. That same year she travelled to the United States for business reasons, and in San Francisco was welcomed at Radio KGO: 'Miss Wallace, an electrical engineer from Australia, will now talk from the studio.' She reportedly used her time on air to comment on the difference between the tram systems in San Francisco and those in Sydney. In 1931 she also notes that she experimented with improving the science of television through the use of chemistry:

"[I] have a pronounced kink for television work and devote most of my spare time in experimenting that branch of the science. Have a deep-rooted conviction that chemistry is going to provide the solution and am working along those lines."

The McKenzies had a mutual interest in tropical fish and had an enormous fishpond in the front yard. She spoke of heating water electrically to house tropical fish at home in the early 1920s, and of having given talks on Radio 2FC about tropical fish in the days when she was doing electrical contracting work. In January 1933 the American journal Aquariana published an article written by McKenzie concerning 'Some interesting inhabitants of Sydney seashores', in which she recommended keeping sea horses in a salt-water tank.

McKenzie joined the British-based Women's Engineering Society in the 1930s (at that time the only organisation for women engineers in the world) and was described as "our most distant" member in an article in The Woman Engineer journal 1942.

== Women's technical education ==
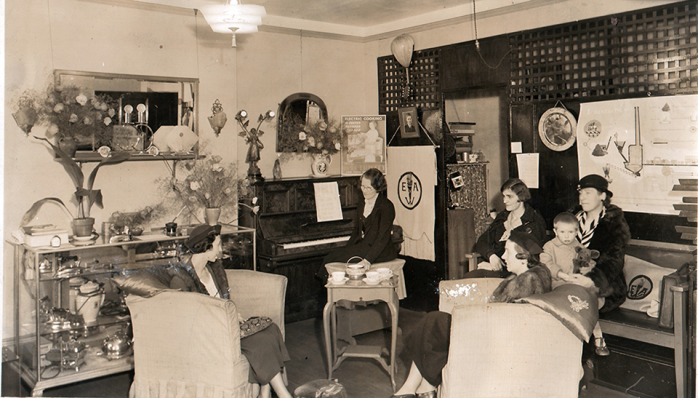
The rooms of the Electrical Association for Women, c1936. McKenzie sitting at the piano

In the 1930s, McKenzie turned her attention increasingly to teaching other women about electricity and radio. She had observed the need over years of working in the field herself. In 1925, she told the Australian Woman's Mirror: "[T]here are such a lot of women experimenters [amongst my customers] that I would like to form a Women's Wireless Club." In 1931 she told a Sunday Sun reporter that she wanted to see a course of lectures on domestic radio and electricity established in girls' schools and technical colleges. The following year she took matters into her own hands, opening a Women's Radio College on Phillip Street in 1932. She persuaded employers to take on some of her trainees, as one of them later recalled:

During the Depression I joined Mrs Mac's electrical school in Phillip Street. It was the first time girls were involved with electrical circuits, Morse and making radio sets. Later Mrs Mac decided it was time to use our skills in industry, so she persuaded Airzone Ltd to take one of us (me) on trial in their radio section. Soon the others followed from the school, and we started the component parts section, and we were absorbed into many other sections.

McKenzie believed that electricity could save women from domestic drudgery, writing that... "To see every woman emancipated from the "heavy" work of the household by the aid of electricity is in itself a worthy object." To this end in 1934 she founded an educational initiative, the Electrical Association for Women (EAW) at 170 King Street in the centre of Sydney, later moving a few blocks away to 9 Clarence Street.

Concerned with safety when using electrical appliances, and no doubt drawing on her own experience in receiving an accidental electric shock that knocked her out for an hour, McKenzie delivered at least one talk on resuscitation, advising that conventional resuscitation should proceed for up to three-quarters of an hour following electrocution. She knew of one case where recovery took 4 hours.

By 1936, McKenzie had sold the Wireless Shop, and was busy at the Electrical Association for Women. She gave electric cooking demonstrations in the EAW kitchen, which was fitted out with show electrical appliances by the Sydney County Council. She compiled the EAW Cookery Book, Australia's first "all-electric" cookery book, which ran into seven editions and remained in print until 1954. She wrote an illustrated book for children about electrical safety called The Electric Imps in 1938.

In July 1938, McKenzie was one of 80 women in attendance at the inaugural meeting of the Australian Women's Flying Corps (later known as the Australian Women's Flying Club) held at the Feminist Club of New South Wales at 77 King Street. She was appointed treasurer and instructor in Morse code to the organisation.

== Women's Emergency Signalling Corps ==
In 1939 McKenzie established the Women's Emergency Signalling Corps (WESC) in her Clarence Street rooms – known affectionately as "Sigs". Her original idea was to train women in telegraphy so that they could replace men working in civilian communications, thereby freeing those skilled men up to serve in the war. By the time war broke out, 120 women had been trained to instructional standard.

== Women's Royal Australian Naval Service ==
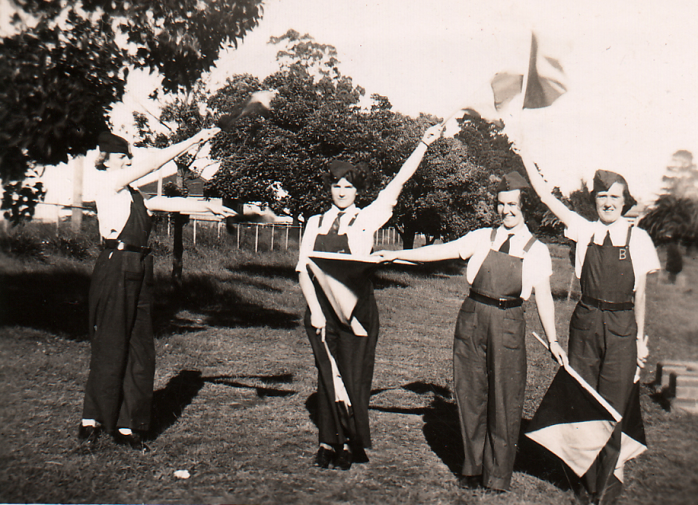
Dressed in the practical green uniforms designed by McKenzie, Corps members spell out W E S C in flag semaphore.

McKenzie campaigned energetically to have some of her female trainees accepted into the Air Force and Navy as telegraphists. She encountered a great deal of official resistance. In 1940 she wrote to the Minister of the Navy, former Prime Minister Billy Hughes, saying "I would like to offer the services of our Signalling Corps, if not acceptable as telegraphists then at least as instructors." Despite her suggestion being dismissed, some time later McKenzie and six trainees were provided third-class train tickets to Melbourne to meet with the Naval Board for testing.

In early January 1941, Commander Newman, the Navy's Director of Signals and Communications, visited the WESC headquarters on Clarence Street to test McKenzie's trainees. Finding they were highly proficient, he recommended the Navy admit them. Hughes still took some convincing. After McKenzie threatened to take her offer to the Air Force instead, the urgent need for trained telegraphists prevailed, and on 21 April a Navy Office letter authorised the entry of women into the Navy. This was the beginning of the Women's Royal Australian Naval Service – the WRANS. The minister's condition was that "no publicity...be accorded this break with tradition".

On 28 April 1941, McKenzie accompanied 14 of her WESC trainees (twelve telegraphists and two domestic helpers). They had their medical test on 25 April and arrived at HMAS Harman in Canberra on 28 April 1941. The women were dressed in their green WESC uniform which had been designed by McKenzie herself – it was several months before a female Navy uniform was ready. Francis Proven became WRANS number 1. From this initial intake of 14, the WRANS ranks expanded to some 2,600 by the end of the war, representing about 10 per cent of the entire Royal Australian Naval force at the time. All told, McKenzie trained about 3,000 women, one-third of whom went into the services. Many others remained at the Clarence Street school as instructors.

In May 1941, the Air Force appointed McKenzie as an honorary flight officer of the Women's Auxiliary Australian Air Force, so she could legitimately instruct Air Force personnel. This was the only official recognition McKenzie received during the war for her efforts.

== Post-war wireless training ==
Violet McKenzie helped with rehabilitation after the war, keeping her school open for as long as there was a need for instruction in wireless signalling. In the postwar years, she trained men from the merchant navy, pilots in commercial aviation, and others needing the trade qualification known as a "signaller's ticket". In 1948, a reporter from Sky Script visited the school and described the scene, and diversity of the students:

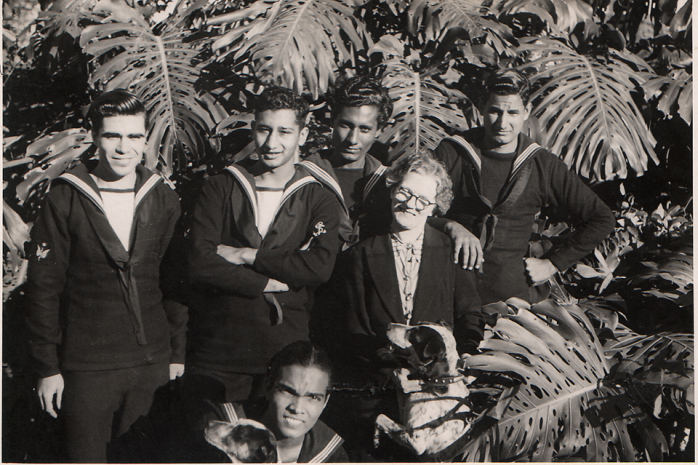
Mrs McKenzie with overseas naval personnel, c1953

At a table in a corner recently there were six elementary trainees: One was a Chinese quartermaster, another a half-Burmese. Two were Americans ... One ... an aircraft skipper down from New Guinea to get his wireless ticket; and the other chap a ship's officer with the same objective. In another corner there's an ANA commander preparing for his 20-word-a-minute exam: an English ship's wireless officer...an ex-RAF Wing-Commander...an Indian Navy man... [and] groups of airline 'types' also on the job.

McKenzie told a journalist that, after the war, "All the airmen came back and wanted to join Qantas, but they needed to build up their Morse speed and learn to use the modern equipment." The Department of Civil Aviation fitted out a room at the school with transmitters, receivers and radio compass so that pilots could train for their wireless ticket at the school. From 1948, McKenzie held a First Class Flight Radio Telephony Operator Licence.

One of the ex-RAAF airmen who retrained for a civilian career with McKenzie wrote:

Being unemployed, we spent almost all of each weekday at the school, so if a tuition fee had been applicable, Mrs Mac would have earned a tidy sum of money. That, of course, was not her way of doing things. She required no payment for the training she provided, and I suspect that she was quite out of pocket over the whole affair... It would be true to say that a great number of the pilots whose futures were finally fulfilled in airlines in Australia owe a deal to Mrs Mac... There was no other school operating in Sydney at the time, providing Morse training to potential airline pilots, and no other school then or thereafter giving such training completely free of charge.

Famous aviators who trained for their wireless ticket at McKenzie's school include Patrick Gordon Taylor and Cecil Arthur Butler. McKenzie also trained Mervyn Wood, later Commissioner of Police in New South Wales, and the principals of the Navigation Schools at both the Melbourne and Sydney Technical Colleges.

According to a People magazine profile of McKenzie written in January 1953, McKenzie received an unceremonious notice from the owners of 10 Clarence Street to quit the premises. The Sands Directory indicates that she moved her operation briefly to No 6 Wharf at Circular Quay in 1953, before retiring to her home at Greenwich Point in 1954. McKenzie wrote that she closed the school when the airlines established their own school and the government added a signals training section to the Navigation School at the Technical College. She continued to help the occasional pupil with special difficulties at her home.

== Later life ==
=== Correspondence with Einstein ===
In early 1949 McKenzie started writing to Albert Einstein. Her first letter to him wished him a speedy recovery from recent illness. Two of her letters are held in the Einstein archives in Jerusalem. It is clear from the second letter that he wrote back to her at least once. Some accounts claim that McKenzie corresponded regularly with Einstein for as long as 15 years before his death in 1955, but the documentary record suggests such reports exaggerate the extent of the correspondence. She also sent him several gifts over the years including shells (for his daughter) that airmen would collect across the Pacific on her request and a boomerang which had been brought to her from Central Australia by an airline pilot. She wrote that, "Some of your mathematical friends might like to plot its flight!" There are other reports that she sent him a didgeridoo, and a recording of didgeridoo music when he replied that he couldn't work out how to play the instrument.

=== Awards and honours ===
On 8 June 1950, McKenzie was appointed an Officer of the Order of the British Empire (OBE) for her work with the WESC. In 1957 she was elected a Fellow of the Australian Institute of Navigation. In 1964 she became Patron of the Ex-WRANS Association. In 1979 she was made a Member of the Royal Naval Amateur Radio Society. In 1980 a plaque celebrating her "skills, character and generosity" was unveiled at the Missions to Seamen Mariners' Church, Flying Angel House. The church has since relocated to 320 Sussex Street, where the plaque can be seen in the garden. She was posthumously inducted onto the Victorian Honour Roll of Women in 2001. Captain Cook Cruises named a Richardson Devine Marine built ferry that operates on Sydney Harbour Florence Violet McKenzie in 2015.

In March 2022 Snowy Hydro named a tunnel boring machine after McKenzie. In September 2023, a park adjacent to the shopping centre in Campbell, Australian Capital Territory, was named in her honour.

=== Final years ===
Violet McKenzie was nine years older than her husband Cecil, but she outlived him by 23 years. After his death in 1958, she shared her house for a time with Cecil's sister Jean, a primary school teacher. In May 1977, after a stroke paralysed her right side and made her wheelchair reliant, McKenzie moved to the nearby Glenwood Nursing Home in the suburb of Greenwich. She died peacefully in her sleep on 23 May 1982. At her funeral service, held at the Church of St Giles in Greenwich, 24 serving WRANS formed a Guard of Honour. McKenzie was cremated at the Northern Suburbs Crematorium. The June 1982 edition of the newsletter of the Ex-WRANS Association was devoted to their former teacher and patron. Amongst the memories recorded therein is a statement McKenzie made two days before she died: "...it is finished, and I have proved to them all that women can be as good as, or better than men."

== See also ==
- Women in early radio
- Edith Clarke

== Bibliography and External links ==
- Dufty, David (2020), Radio Girl: The Story of the Extraordinary Mrs Mac, Pioneering Engineer and Wartime Legend, Allen & Unwin, ISBN 978-1-76087-665-4
- McKenzie, Florence Violet (1892–1982) at The Australian Women's Register
- "Signals, currents and wires: the untold story of Florence Violet McKenzie", in Hindsight ABC Radio National by Catherine Freyne. First broadcast 16 March 2008.
- Huie, Shirley Fenton (2000), Ships belles: the story of the Women's Royal Australian Naval Service in war and peace 1941–1985, Watermark Press, ISBN 978-0-949284-47-1
This Wikipedia article is substantially built upon the essay "McKenzie, Violet" in the Dictionary of Sydney
written by Catherine Freyne, 2010 and licensed under CC by-sa. Imported on 7 September 2011.
