= Women's Emergency Signalling Corps =

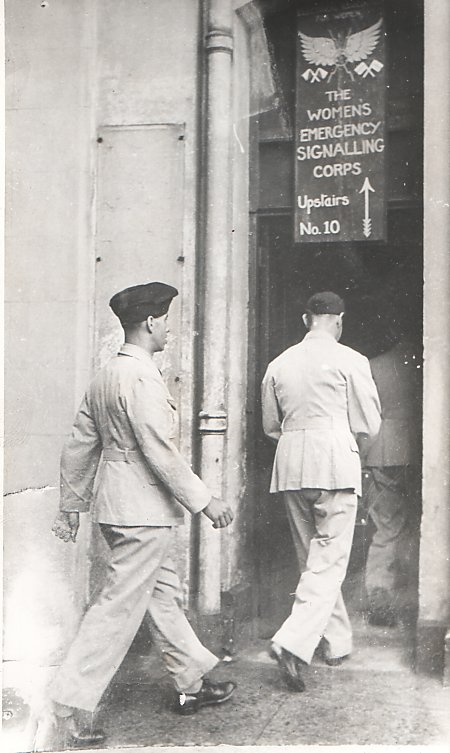
Servicemen entering WESC c 1940 to receive signals training

The Women's Emergency Signalling Corps (WESC) was founded by Florence Violet McKenzie in 1939 as a volunteer organisation in Sydney. As World War II loomed, McKenzie saw that with her qualifications and teaching skills she could make a valuable contribution. She foresaw a military demand for people with skills in wireless communications. As she told The Australian Women's Weekly in 1978: "When Neville Chamberlain came back from Munich and said 'Peace in our time' [sic], I began preparing for war."

Initially, training was provided to female trainees, but after the war broke out, the corps also provided training to male servicemen using a pool of female instructors. In 1941, a number of WESC personnel were recruited into the Royal Australian Navy initially as civilian employees before becoming part of the Women's Royal Australian Naval Service in 1942. Throughout the war, the demand for signals training saw over 12,000 servicemen and recruits receive training at the WESC school, while 3,000 women also received signals training, with around one third joining the services. The organisation was dissolved in 1954.

== History ==
=== Foundation ===
In 1939 McKenzie established the Women's Emergency Signalling Corps in Sydney in her Clarence Street rooms – known affectionately as "Sigs". Her original idea was to train women in telegraphy so that they could replace men working in civilian communications, thereby freeing those skilled men up to serve in the war. By the time war broke out, 120 women had been trained to instructional standard.

=== Training for men ===
It quickly became apparent that men in the armed forces also urgently needed training in wireless communications and McKenzie's female trainees were in a position to train the male servicemen directly:

Early in the war, one young would-be pilot tried to enlist but was refused because he didn't know Morse code. By sheer coincidence he walked past [the Women's Emergency Signalling Corps on Clarence Street] and heard the sounds of Morse signalling. "It was just a room full of women", remembered Mrs McKenzie, "but he walked up to me and said 'Will you teach me Morse code?" I just heaved a big sigh because I saw a whole world opening up in front of me. Then I knew what we could do. We could train girls to train the men. It was wonderful, because I'd thought we could only do things like relieving in the post office."

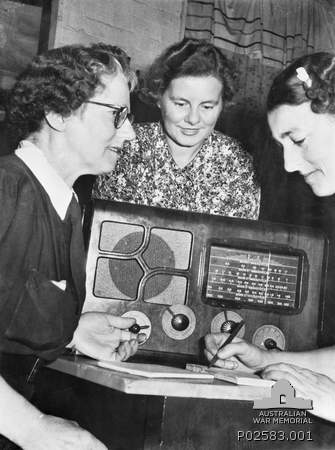
Members of WESC

The premises at 9 Clarence Street became overcrowded, so McKenzie moved the operation to an old wool store at 10 Clarence Street, where during the 1940s the WESC occupied the first and second floors, which she renovated with linoleum flooring and installed radio equipment for twelve classes. Sometimes military intelligence personnel would appear at the school with complaints from guests in the pub next door, who thought a spy operation was at work when they heard Morse code through the walls each evening.

=== Funding ===
McKenzie ran the school without any government grant or allocation of accommodation by the services. The women of the WESC each gave one shilling per week towards the rent. No fees were ever charged for tuition as McKenzie said it was "her contribution to the war effort". By August 1940, there was a waiting list of 600 women for the small school, and WESC-trained telegraphists were teaching men from the armed forces and merchant navy.

=== Joining the Navy ===
Inspired by an article on the Women's Royal Naval Service, McKenzie contacted the Royal Australian Navy on several occasions to suggest that her telegraphists be employed by the RAN. In 1940 she wrote to the Minister of the Navy, former Prime Minister WM (Billy) Hughes, saying "I would like to offer the services of our Signalling Corps, if not acceptable as telegraphists then at least as instructors." In early January 1941, Commander Newman, the Navy's Director of Signals and Communications, visited the WESC headquarters on Clarence Street to test McKenzie's trainees. Finding they were highly proficient, he recommended the Navy admit them. Hughes still took some convincing. After McKenzie threatened to take her offer to the Air Force instead, the urgent need for trained telegraphists prevailed, and on 21 April a Navy Office letter authorised the entry of women into the Navy. This was the beginning of the Women's Royal Australian Naval Service – the WRANS. The minister's condition was that "no publicity...be accorded this break with tradition'.

On 28 April 1941, McKenzie accompanied 14 of her WESC trainees (twelve telegraphists and two domestic helpers). They had their medical test on 25 April and arrived at HMAS Harman in Canberra on 28 April 1941. The women were dressed in their green WESC uniform which had been designed by McKenzie herself – it was several months before a female Navy uniform was ready. Francis Proven became WRANS number 1. The women became employed at the Royal Australian Navy Wireless/Transmitting Station Canberra. Six months later, another nine women were recruited. Although treated as naval personnel, the women were technically civilian employees of the RAN. Despite the formation of women's auxiliaries in the Army and Air Force, the RAN remained reluctant to formally enlist the telegraphists.

=== Official recognition ===
The increasing demand for manpower in the Pacific War resulted in a change of opinion in the RAN, with increasing recruitment of female personnel, and public promotion of the service. Approval to form a Women's Royal Australian Naval Service of 580 personnel (280 telegraphists plus 300 other duties) was granted on 24 July 1942, and the initial WESC telegraphists were offered enlistment on 1 October 1942. The scale of the response to recruitment campaigns was unexpected, with over 1,000 women enlisted by the end of 1942. This prompted the RAN to establish an officer corps within the Women's Royal Australian Naval Service, with the first training course for female officers beginning at Flinders Naval Depot on 18 January 1943, and a further 16 courses run by September 1945. The WRANS ranks expanded to some 2,600 by the end of the war, representing about 10 per cent of the entire Royal Australian Naval force at the time. All told, McKenzie trained about 3,000 women, one-third of whom went into the services. By the end of the war approximately 12,000 servicemen and recruits had been trained at the WESC school:

The Army sent lorry loads of soldiers to have early training in Morse before going to the Middle East, the RAAF sent several groups of servicemen in uniform, with their own instructor... to use our equipment. The Royal Indian Navy sent their Indian communication ratings… Many RAN musterings came to the signalling school to improve their signalling. Scores of American servicemen attended the school, sometimes with their own instructor, but mostly to join our classes. More than forty police officers attended the school in their spare time to reach the necessary standard for enlisting as pilots in the RAAF.

The organisation was dissolved in 1954.

== See also ==
- Pat Studdy-Clift
