= Robert Woodruff =

Robert Woodruff may refer to:

- Robert Woodruff (director) (born 1947), theatre director
- Robert A. Woodruff (born 1943), American physicist
- Robert Eastman Woodruff (1884–1957), president of Erie Railroad, 1939–1949
- Robert S. Woodruff, coach at Wheaton College in Illinois
- Robert W. Woodruff (1889–1985), philanthropist and long-time president of The Coca-Cola Company
- Bob Woodruff (born 1961), television journalist wounded in Iraq in 2006
- Bob Woodruff (American football) (1916–2001), University of Florida and Baylor University head football coach
- Bob Woodruff (singer) (born 1961), American country music singer and songwriter
- Bobby Woodruff (born 1940), English former footballer

== See also ==
- Robert Woodruff Anderson, American playwright
