= Rex Gary =

American sports coach (1893–1968)

Biographical details
- Born: February 28, 1893
- Died: May 4, 1968; Sarasota, Florida, U.S.

Playing career

Football
- 1913–1914: Illinois College
- Position: Quarterback

Coaching career (HC unless noted)

Football
- 1919–1920: Wheaton (IL)

Basketball
- 1919–1921: Wheaton (IL)

Baseball
- 1921: Wheaton (IL)

Head coaching record
- Overall: 6–6 (football); 17–7 (basketball); 3–7 (baseball)

Accomplishments and honors

Championships
- Football; 1 IIAC (1920)

Rex Inglis Gary Sr. (February 28, 1893 – May 4, 1968) was an American college football, college basketball, and college baseball coach, executive for the Boy Scouts of America, and United States Army officer. He served as the head football coach at Wheaton College in Wheaton, Illinois for two seasons, from 1919 to 1920, compiling a record of 6–6. Gary was also the head basketball coach at Wheaton for two seasons, from 1919 to 1921, tallying a mark of 17–7, and the school's baseball coach in 1921, leading his team to a record of 3–7.

Gary attended Alton High School in Alton, Illinois, where he played football. He then went to Illinois College in Jacksonville, Illinois, where he played football as a quarterback in 1913 and 1914. In 1919, Gary, then a U.S. Army lieutenant, was listed as slighted wounded by the United States Department of War.

In 1935, Gary left St. Joseph, Missouri to work for the Boy Scouts's Valley Forge Council of Philadelphia. He was later executive of the Pony Express Council of the Boy Scouts of America. Gary was killed on May 4, 1968, in an automobile accident in Sarasota, Florida. He was buried at Arlington National Cemetery.

== Head coaching record ==
=== Football ===
Year	Team	Overall	Conference	Standing	Bowl/playoffs
Wheaton Crusaders (Illinois Intercollegiate Athletic Conference) (1919–1920)
1919	Wheaton	2–3			
1920	Wheaton	4–3		T–1st	
Wheaton:		6–6			
Total:		6–6			
National championship Conference title Conference division title or championship game berth

=== Basketball ===
Record table
Season	Team	Overall	Conference	Standing	Postseason
Wheaton Crusaders (Illinois Intercollegiate Athletic Conference) (1919–1921)
1919–20	Wheaton	13–4			
1920–21	Wheaton	4–3			
Wheaton:		17–7			
Total:		17–7			
