= Wireless Weekly =

Australian wireless magazine

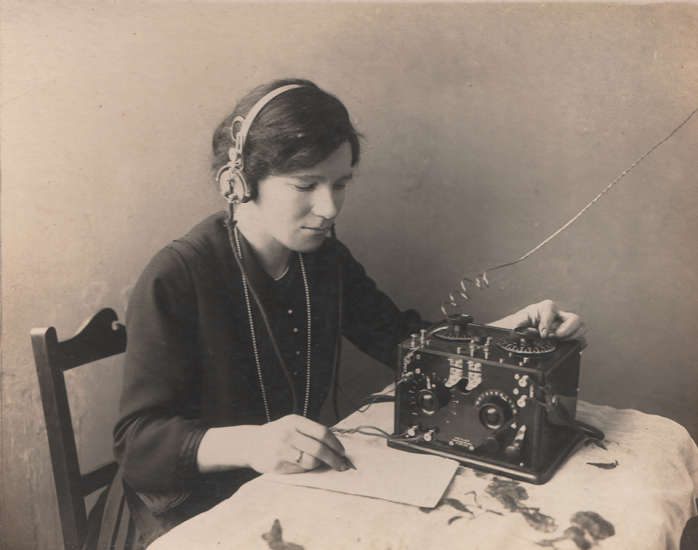
McKenzie working with the wireless radio c1922

Wireless Weekly was Australia's first news-stand wireless magazine (not counting the AWA Monthly), published in 1922 in Sydney by William John Foster St Clair Maclardy ("W. J. Maclardy") and his father William McIntyre St Clair Maclardy ("W. M. Maclardy"). W. J. Maclardy was one of the founders of the "A" Class radio station 2SB (soon changed to 2BL). It arose from conversations between Florence McKenzie (née Wallace), aka 'Violet Wallace, 'Vera Wallace' and later 'Mrs Mac' (1890-1982), who owned a wireless shop in the Royal Arcade, Sydney, Ron Marsden her engineer, and Maclardy. The front cover featured a photo of amateur radio activity.

== First issue ==
The first issue of Wireless Weekly was planned in weekly meetings in Mr. MacLardy's reportedly 'dark and dusty basement' in Castlereagh Street, Sydney. Mrs Mackenzie wrote industry news, components notes, a short story or maybe a wireless 'poem'. Mr. Marsden wrote technical article. Mr A. Mitchell, as Editor, arranged the material, adding relevant material from Sydney's Evening News daily where he worked.

The first 12- page issue had a print run of a few hundred copies, and went on sale from Mrs. Mackenzie's shop at 8am on 4 August 1922. It carried the imprint: Published by WJ.MacLardy, 249 Castlereagh Street, Sydney.

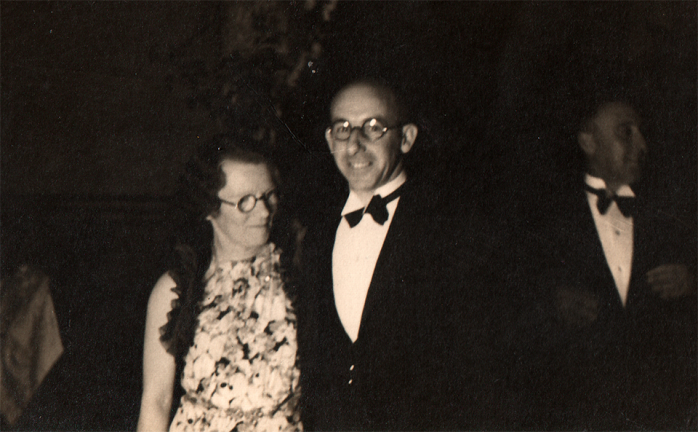
Violet McKenzie and husband Cecil McKenzie c1935

Initially Wireless Weekly was exclusively for amateurs, but gradually became a broadcast listeners' journal. With the start of commercial broadcasting in 1923, it featured information about commercial stations and programs and flourished, often exceeding 64 pages.

== Sale and continued publication ==
In 1923 the publication was sold to Wireless Newspapers Ltd. As time passed, Wireless Weekly became a listeners' weekly program magazine sometimes including small booklets as supplements, listing amateur and commercial radio stations.

The Wireless Weekly became the monthly magazine "Radio & Hobbies", then "Radio, Television & Hobbies", and finally Electronics Australia, and remained in circulation until 2001.

== Special Publications ==
Throughout the life of Wireless Weekly, the publishers produced a range of adjuncts to the magazine. Sometimes these were simply supplements of a few pages, included in the sold magazine, but which could be readily separated from the magazine proper. But less frequently, larger special publications were produced and sold separately to the main magazine, including:

- "A Booklet of Call Signs" 27 November 1931
- "What Station was That" 24 August 1934
- "What Station is That" 6 December 1935.
