= Jasper Turnbell =

American football and basketball coach (1890–1958)

Jasper Turnbull
Biographical details
- Born: January 8, 1890; Pawnee City, Nebraska, U.S.
- Died: October 4, 1958 (aged 68); Oklahoma City, Oklahoma, U.S.

Coaching career (HC unless noted)

Football
- 1914–1915: Wheaton (IL)

Basketball
- 1914–1916: Wheaton (IL)

Head coaching record
- Overall: 6–7 (football); 7–15 (basketball)

Jasper Robert Turnbull (January 8, 1890 – October 4, 1958) was an American college football and college basketball coach. He was the first head football coach at Wheaton College in Wheaton, Illinois, serving for the 1914 and 1915 seasons and compiling a record of 6–7. Turnbull was also the head basketball coach at Wheaton from 1914 to 1916, tallying a mark of 7–15.

Turnbull died in 1958.

== Head coaching record ==
=== Football ===
| Year | Team | Overall | Conference | Standing | Bowl/playoffs |
|---|---|---|---|---|---|
Wheaton Crusaders (Independent) (1914–1915)
| 1914 | Wheaton | 1–6 | | | |
| 1915 | Wheaton | 5–2 | | | |
| Wheaton: | | 6–7 | | | |
| Total: | | 6–7 | | | |
