= Robert S. Woodruff =

American sports coach, educator (1895–1981)

Biographical details
- Born: 1895; Georgetown, Illinois, U.S.
- Died: October 31, 1981 (aged 86); Clearwater, Florida, U.S.

Playing career

Football
- 1913–1916: DePauw
- Position: End

Coaching career (HC unless noted)

Football
- 1921: Wheaton (IL)
- 1922–1926: Carbondale Community HS (IL)

Basketball
- 1921–1922: Wheaton (IL)
- 1922–1927: Carbondale Community HS (IL)

Baseball
- 1922: Wheaton (IL)

Head coaching record
- Overall: 6–2 (college football); 4–10 (college basketball); 2–5 (college baseball)

Robert S. Woodruff (1895 – October 31, 1981) was an American football, basketball, and baseball coach and educator. He served as the head football coach at Wheaton College in Wheaton, Illinois for one season, in 1921, compiling a record of 6–2.

A native of Georgetown, Illinois, Woodruff graduated from DePauw University in Greencastle, Indiana, where he played on the football team, lettering in 1913, 1914, and 1915. He elected team captain in 1916, succeeding John Foote who resigned from the position. In late October, Woodruff suffered a "dry knee", and was ordered to cease playing.

Woodruff served as a first lieutenant in the United States Army during World War I. In 1922, Woodruff was as the first athletic coach at Carbondale Community High School in Carbondale, Illinois. He coached football and basketball at Carbondale Community before leaving the school in 1927. His football team won a conference championship in 1923, and his basketball squad won a conference title in 1924–25. Woodruff also coached track and field and taught mathematics at Carbondale Community. He later taught in Lawrenceville, Illinois and at Oak Park High School in Oak Park, Illinois prior to his retirement in 1960.

Woodruff and his wife lived in Clearwater, Florida for over 20 years. He died at the age of 86, on October 31, 1981, at Horizon Hospital in Clearwater.

== Head coaching record ==
=== College football ===
Year	Team	Overall	Conference	Standing	Bowl/playoffs
Wheaton Crusaders (Illinois Intercollegiate Athletic Conference) (1921)
1921	Wheaton	6–2			
Wheaton:		6–2			
Total:		6–2			
