= Mike Swider =

American football coach (born 1955)

Biographical details
- Born: May 26, 1955 (age 71); Illinois, U.S.

Coaching career (HC unless noted)
- 1977: Indiana (GA)
- 1978–1984: Westminster HS (GA)
- 1985–1996: Wheaton (IL) (DC)
- 1996–2019: Wheaton (IL)

Head coaching record
- Overall: 209–52
- Tournaments: 15–10 (NCAA D-III playoffs)

Accomplishments and honors

Championships
- 9 CCIW (2000, 2002–2004, 2006, 2012, 2014–2015, 2019); Georgia Class 3A (1978)

Awards
- 7× CCIW Coach of the Year (2002, 2002–2003, 2006, 2014–2015, 2019)

Mike Swider (born May 26, 1955) is an American former football coach. He served as head football coach at Wheaton College in Wheaton, Illinois from 1996 to 2019. Swider's Wheaton teams won nine conference titles and made 10 appearances in the NCAA Division III football championship playoffs. In each of their first five appearances, they were eliminated from the tournament by Larry Kehres's Mount Union Purple Raiders.

Swider's coaching record at Wheaton was 209–52. He has the most wins and highest winning percentage (.801) of any coach in program history. Swider announced his retirement on December 10, 2019.

== Head coaching record ==
Year	Team	Overall	Conference	Standing	Bowl/playoffs
Wheaton Crusaders/Thunder (College Conference of Illinois and Wisconsin) (1996–2019)
1996	Wheaton	8–1	6–1	2nd	
1997	Wheaton	4–5	4–3	T–3rd	
1998	Wheaton	6–3	5–2	T–2nd	
1999	Wheaton	7–2	5–2	T–2nd	
2000	Wheaton	8–2	6–1	T–1st	
2001	Wheaton	6–4	5–2	T–3rd	
2002	Wheaton	10–2	7–0	1st	L NCAA Division III Second Round
2003	Wheaton	12–1	7–0	1st	L NCAA Division III Quarterfinal
2004	Wheaton	10–2	6–1	T–1st	L NCAA Division III Second Round
2005	Wheaton	7–3	4–3	T–3rd	
2006	Wheaton	10–2	6–1	T–1st	L NCAA Division III Second Round
2007	Wheaton	8–2	5–2	3rd	
2008	Wheaton	11–3	5–2	T–2nd	L NCAA Division III Semifinal
2009	Wheaton	7–3	4–3	T–3rd	
2010	Wheaton	10–2	6–1	2nd	L NCAA Division III Second Round
2011	Wheaton	8–2	5–2	3rd	
2012	Wheaton	8–2	6–1	T–1st	
2013	Wheaton	8–2	5–2	3rd	
2014	Wheaton	11–1	7–0	1st	L NCAA Division III Second Round
2015	Wheaton	11–1	7–0	1st	L NCAA Division III Second Round
2016	Wheaton	11–2	7–1	2nd	L NCAA Division III Quarterfinal
2017	Wheaton	8–2	6–2	3rd	
2018	Wheaton	8–2	7–2	T–3rd	
2019	Wheaton	12–1	9–0	1st	L NCAA Division III Quarterfinal
Wheaton:		209–52	140–34		
Total:		209–52			
National championship Conference title Conference division title or championship game berth

== See also ==
- List of college football career coaching wins leaders
