= David Gillespie (author) =

Australian author

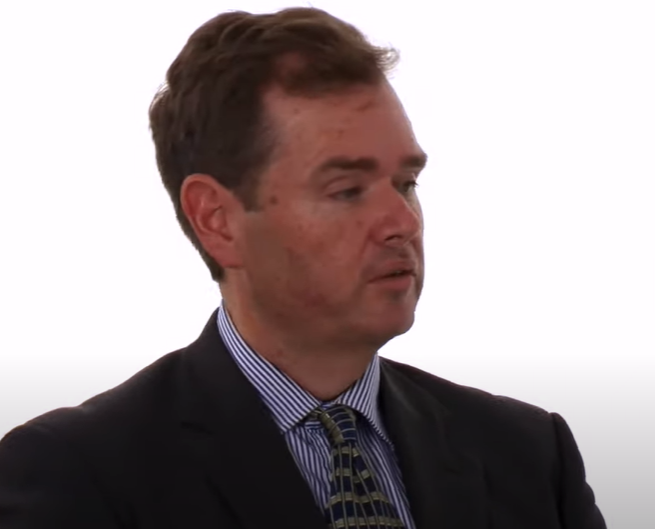
- Occupations: Lawyer, author
- Writing career
- Genres: Diet, psychology
- Notable works: Sweet Poison, Why Sugar Makes Us Fat, Toxic Oil, Taming Toxic People, Free Schools

David Gillespie is an Australian lawyer, anti-sugar activist and low-carbohydrate diet author who has written several books about health and nutrition. Gillespie admits to no qualifications in nutrition or medicine. Gillespie's advocacy for a diet high in saturated fat and his erroneous claim that polyunsaturated fat from vegetable oil is toxic have been criticized by medical experts as dangerous, misleading and wrong.

== Books ==
Gillespie has authored a number of books in the nutrition and self-help genre.

Sweet Poison, Why Sugar Makes Us Fat is Gillespie's first book which tells the story of how and why he stopped eating sugar. This was followed by the publication of The Sweet Poison Quit Plan, the 'how to' supplement to Sweet Poison; The Sweet Poison Quit Plan Cookbook, a supplementary book of recipes for sweets made with dextrose instead of fructose and The No Sugar Recipe Book, which is the UK edition of the cookbook under a different title. Several Sugar Free Shopper's Guides were first published in 2014 and updated in 2016, for the Australian, North American and British markets.

Following the commercial success of his anti-sugar books, Gillespie published Toxic Oil: Why Vegetable Oil Will Kill You And How To Save Yourself which examines what he believes are the dangers of eating vegetable oil.

Gillespie has also written several books about food and dieting that combine his beliefs. Big Fat Lies: How The Diet Industry Is Making You Sick, Fat & Poor which combines Gillespie's views on sugar and polyunsaturated oils; Eat Real Food laying out Gillespie's arguments for why one should eat fresh, not processed food and Eat Real Food Cookbook, the supplementary cookbook for Eat Real Food.

In 2017 Gillespie published Taming Toxic People: The science of identifying and dealing with psychopaths at work and home in which he claims to examine the scientific research on psychopaths and attempts to understand how they operate and how best to deal with them.

With six children to educate, Gillespie has also turned his attention to schooling in Australia and in 2014 published his research in Free Schools: How to get a great education without paying a fortune.

== General discussion of Gillespie's approach ==
Gillespie has researched and written a series of books about diet and other issues on the basis of his personal experience and conclusions from reading. In the introduction to Big Fat Lies he states "I'm just a lawyer who's worried about my health and the health of my family". He confirms his lack of specific training in many interviews with statements such as: "I’m not a nutritionist or doctor or a biochemist or any of that sort of stuff. So, I’m phenomenally unqualified to talk to anybody about any of that stuff, but because I’m a lawyer it’s not gonna stop me." His knowledge of psychology and education is also through personal research reading.

== Criticism of food and diet books ==
Much criticism of Gillespie's arguments cite his use of qualitative language, his stance of declaring foods "good and bad" or using terms such as "toxic" or "poison". The "typical modern" meals Gillespie describes are recognized by qualified dietitians as unhealthy but these experts maintain that a balanced diet as identified in scientific studies is the recommended diet rather than the extremes that Gillespie suggests. Dietitian Karen Inge comments "Put simply, there are no bad foods per se. There are some that lack nutritional integrity but consumed occasionally, in small quantities as a celebratory food or treat, they would have no long-lasting negative effects on our health...But there are poorly balanced diets. There are diets that have excessively large portions of foods and drinks that contribute too many kilojoules – whether the source is sugar, fat, protein or alcohol."

When Rosemary Stanton, a well known Australian dietitian, was asked to comment on Gillespie's attitude to food, she said "I really think common sense would set us off on the right path. If you're overweight you're eating too much food and it should be less junk food. And this is really far more important than finding a scapegoat. Whether that scapegoat be a particular kind of sugar, a particular kind of fat or the glycemic index."

The National Heart Foundation of Australia has released a statement disagreeing with Gillespie's claims around vegetable oils and including a strong health warning. "There is no single cause of chronic diseases, including heart disease. However there is scientific consensus that replacing saturated fat with unsaturated fat, in particular polyunsaturated fat, reduces your risk of heart disease. The Heart Foundation believes that to say otherwise is dangerous, misleading and wrong. Following such advice is fraught with risk and if followed could lead to the rapid development of serious health conditions."

With reference to Gillespie's attitude to sugar Stanton says: "It makes very good sense to cut down on food such as sugar where you have no nutrients present rather than cutting down on foods such as fruit and I would absolutely differ with David Gillespie here because there are lots of studies showing when people eat a bit more fruit, and I am talking about fruit not juice, that is correlated with a lower risk of weight gain."

Gillespie's belief that polyunsaturated fats cause cancer is not supported by evidence-based medicine and diametrically opposed to every leading cancer authority in the world. Peter Clifton a Professor of Nutrition at the University of South Australia has criticized Gillespie's dietary book Toxic Oil as poorly researched and the message "so over-the-top that it’s hard to believe that anyone would take it seriously".

== Discussion of Taming Toxic People ==
Gillespie bases his analysis in his book Taming Toxic People on "available research, personal experience and observations, as well as stories of psychopaths and their victims". Most studies he has examined involve male prison inmates. As with his other books he claims no expertise in his subject.

The term "psychopath" is not defined in the Diagnostic and Statistical Manual of Mental Disorders (DSM). Gillespie says describing someone as a psychopath "is really just a shorthand way of saying a person that completely lacks empathy." He uses as examples of "the possible behaviour of psychopaths", the behaviour of figures as diverse as Mother Teresa, Caligula, Donald Trump, Lance Armstrong, Winston Churchill and Jesus while saying the tests used are not scientific.

== Discussion of Free Schools ==
Free Schools is a book about the Australian Education system. In the book Gillespie looks at how Australia came to have the current school system and then provides a guide to finding the best school. The key finding of the book is that "there is no correlation between how much you pay and the quality of education".

Gillespie argues that there are two critical factors in identifying the best school; the quality of the teachers and the quality of the leadership team and that these can be found in any part of the Australian school system. In the book Gillespie states that he has 6 children and if he sent them to the private school he attended or the equivalent girls' school he would have to have paid over $AUS1.3 million in fees. While the book has received criticism from Teachers Unions, who he says have taken incentives away from teachers, and by the independent school system, no one has disputed that the quality of teachers count.

== Personal life ==
Gillespie is married with six children, the two youngest of whom are twins.
