= Jesse Scott =

American football coach (born c. 1986)

Current position
- Title: Head coach
- Team: Wheaton (IL)
- Conference: CCIW
- Record: 58–12

Biographical details
- Born: c. 1986 (age 39–40)
- Education: Wheaton College (2009)

Playing career
- 2005–2008: Wheaton (IL)
- Position: Right tackle

Coaching career (HC unless noted)
- 2009–2010: Wheaton (IL) (GA)
- 2011: Wheaton (IL) (DL)
- 2012–2015: Wheaton (IL) (OL)
- 2016–2019: Wheaton (IL) (OC)
- 2020–present: Wheaton (IL)

Head coaching record
- Overall: 58–12
- Bowls: 1–0
- Tournaments: 5–4 (NCAA D-III playoffs)

Accomplishments and honors

Championships
- 1 CCIW (2026)

Jesse Scott (born c. 1986) is an American college football coach. He is the head football coach for Wheaton College, a position he has held since 2020. He was a long-time assistant for Wheaton Thunder football program, serving from 2009 to 2019. He played college football for Wheaton as a right tackle.

== Head coaching record ==
Year	Team	Overall	Conference	Standing	Bowl/playoffs	AFCA^{#}	D3^{°}
Wheaton Thunder (College Conference of Illinois and Wisconsin) (2020–present)
2020–21	No team—COVID-19						
2021	Wheaton	10–2	8–1	2nd	L NCAA Division III Second Round	9	9
2022	Wheaton	8–3	8–1	2nd	L NCAA Division III First Round	17	17
2023	Wheaton	10–2	8–1	2nd	L NCAA Division III Second Round	13	12
2024	Wheaton	9–2	8–1	2nd	W Isthmus		23
2025	Wheaton	11–3	8–1	2nd	L NCAA Division III Quarterfinal	7	7
2026	Wheaton	10–0	8–0	1st			
Wheaton:		58–12	48–5				
Total:		58–12					
