= Wendell Smith (coach) =

American football and track and field coach (1908–1994)

Wendel Smith
Biographical details
- Born: December 15, 1908; Aurora, Nebraska, U.S.
- Died: May 8, 1994; Riverside County, California, U.S.

Playing career

Football
- 1927–1929: Occidental

Track and field
- 1929–1930: Occidental
- Positions: End (football); Hammer throw, discus throw, hurles, 100-yard dash, decathlon (track and field)

Coaching career (HC unless noted)

Football
- 1935: Wheaton (IL)
- 1936–1938: Manual Arts HS (CA) (line)
- 1939–1941: Manual Arts HS (CA)
- 1946: Manual Arts HS (CA)
- 1966: Los Angeles City (backfield)

Track and field
- 1936–?: Manual Arts HS (CA)
- 1947–?: Los Angeles City

Head coaching record
- Overall: 2–5–1 (college football)

Marion Wendell Smith (December 15, 1908 – May 8, 1994) was an American football and track and field coach. He served as the head football coach at Wheaton College in Wheaton, Illinois for one season, in 1935, compiling a record of 2–5–1.

After graduating from Van Nuys High School in the Van Nuys neighborhood of Los Angeles, Smith attended Occidental College played on the football team as an End, and led the Occidental Tigers football to a Southern California Conference title in 1929. For Occidental's track and field team, he competed in the hammer throw, discus throw, Hurles, and 100-yard dash. In 1929 and 1930, Smith won the Cliff Argue trophy, awarded to the athlete with the most points at the annual dual track meet between Occidental and Pomona College.

In 1932, Smith was working as a professor of physical education and hygiene at Belvedere Junior High School in Los Angeles. He also competed in track with the Los Angeles Athletic Club (LAAC) at that time. In June 1932, he won the Southern California decathlon meet in Los Angeles.

Smith was hired as Wheaton College in 1935 as head football coach and physical instructor. He joined the coaching staff at Manual Arts High School of Los Angeles in 1936. He was put in charge of the varsity track team and coached the line for the varsity football team. Three years later, in 1939, Smith was promoted to head football coach at Manual Arts, replacing Jim Blewett, who left to join the coaching staff of the UCLA Bruins football team. After serving in the United States Navy during World War II, he returned to Manual Arts as head football coach in 1946. A year later, he succeeded Harry Campbell as head track coach at Los Angeles City College (LACC). In 1966, Smith coached the backfield for football team at LACC, under newly-hired head football coach Ron Botchan, a fellow Occidental alumnus.

== Head coaching record ==
Year	Team	Overall	Conference	Standing	Bowl/playoffs
Wheaton Crusaders (Illinois Intercollegiate Athletic Conference) (1935)
1935	Wheaton	2–5–1	1–2–1	T–13th	
Wheaton:		2–5–1	1–2–1		
Total:		2–5–1			
