= Pat Studdy-Clift =

Patricia Elizabeth Studdy (1926 – 2 July 2017) after her marriage known as Studdy-Clift or Pat Clift, and thus most often referred to as Pat Studdy-Clift, was an Australian author specialising in historical fiction and non-fiction. Even in her mature years and legally blind for the last 17 years due to the insidious onset of macular degeneration, she continues to pursue her love of researching and writing books on exciting people and events in our nation's colourful history.

Born in 1926 she lived in Gunnedah until she was sent to a boarding school in Sydney. On the outbreak of WWII she left the school and returned to Gunnedah where she ran the property with her mother, an invalid father and eventually three Italian Prisoners of War. She wrote ten books.

== Biography ==
Initially educated by Brackfriars Correspondence School at the family rural property, “Kareela”, outside of Gunnedah in north-western NSW followed by secondary schooling in Sydney at Ascham Girls School to Intermediate standard.

In 1943, aged 15, she joined the Women's Emergency Signalling Corps in Sydney where she taught Morse code to the personnel from the Australian Air Force, Merchant Navy and also American Airmen, who had trouble grasping the concept. This was the time of the midget sub shelling on Sydney suburbs and their torpedo attacks on harbour shipping in 1942.

With her father doing his war duty as an Army officer in Victoria Barracks in Sydney and the family farm being run by a manager, Studdy-Clift's world was turned upside down when the farm manager suddenly resigned in 1943 and the women folk were required to return to look after the property. Suddenly thrust into a man's world as a teenager, she together with her mother and 5-year-old brother, faced the complexities of running a rural property – compounded by wartime rationing and a raging drought. Battling these elements, she learned many farm skills including killing and cutting up their own meat with Pat even learning to drive a Caterpillar type tractor to build a dam for part of their emergency water supplies. One of her heartbreaking jobs was the mercy killing of stock at death's door from the results of the drought.

A year after Studdy-Clift took over “Kareela” her father was invalided out of the Army and to relieve their manpower shortage they were assigned three Italian prisons of war (POW) for working on the property. Pat often worked on her own with these men in remote parts of the property and never felt threatened by them even though these people were technically the enemy. She wrote and illustrated a book on these experiences titled “Only Our Gloves On”, the title reflecting that Pat and her sister, Joan, slept in the hot summer evenings in the nude but wore gloves to protect the bed sheets from the homemade concoction that softened their rough farmers’ hands in an effort to preserve their femininity. (Pat's older sister, Joan, received her discharge from the Australian Women's Army Service (AWAS) towards the end of the war and returned home to help on the farm.)

After the war Studdy-Clift and her sister became share farmers (working their father's land for a share of the profits) with their own tractor, truck and equipment. They were the first known women broad acre share farmers in NSW and possible Australia and traded as the Studdy Sisters with even their truck sign written with that title.

Marrying Jim Clift from Breeza, NSW in 1948, they moved in late 1954 to a river front property near Condamine in the western Darling Downs in Queensland, which they developed with almost 30 years of hard but rewarding work. Again she faced many challenges, not the least of which was being left alone by the menfolk in a heavily pregnant state and with a small but active toddler and his two older brothers, who travelled to school by boat and bus, while being surrounded by floodwaters for 6 months and having no forms of communication. Heavily engaged in transforming the under developed lands into a thriving rural enterprise she also involved herself and the family with many local activities. One unusual interest that the family followed from the start of the 1960s was water skiing on the local lagoons with Pat becoming very proficient at water ballet. She has written up these and many other experiences in a book called “On the Banks of the Condamine” with a later revised edition named “On the Banks of the Condamine Revisited”. It personalises the challenges of being on the land and threads a tapestry of the strong social fabric of the surrounding rural community of those times.

'Retiring' to northern NSW in the 1980s and captivated by the cosmopolitan nature of the Tweed Shire she wrote and illustrated two books called “The Many Faces of the Tweed”, a snapshot of the characters from her newly adopted neighbourhood. Interviewing and recording a diverse range of people varying from followers of Hare Krishna and ‘Orange People’ through to singers like Jade Hurley and the civic movers and shakers, she immersed herself in many aspects of local culture very foreign from her rural roots. The second Tweed book was a project in association with local unemployed youths.

Having time to seriously pursue her love of writing she then undertook research and completion of a number of books on some of our lesser-known events and characters. A chance meeting with an ex Northern Territory policeman, Ron Brown, led to a collaboration between them that produced two books. The first, “Bush Justice”, tells of Ron's experiences as a lone representative of the white man's law and mediator on camel patrols in the red centre of Australia between 1945 and 1952. The second, titled “Darwin Dilemmas”, details life and the events at that top end administrative centre through the eyes of a local policeman stationed there between the years of 1939 to 1945. His firsthand account recalls the times of the much hushed up 68 air raids on northern Australia by Japanese bombers and the human face of Darwin in the period.

In 1996 Studdy-Clift completed perhaps her most intriguing book to date. Thoroughly researched and based on historical facts, “The Lady Bushranger” relives the life of Elizabeth Jessie Hickman, née Martini, née Hunt, a colourful woman with many aliases, whose story remained hidden along with the Wollemi Pine and her hideout in the extended valleys of the Blue Mountains until the early 90s. Jessie's early circus life, cattle duffing, repeated escapes from the police and her final taming are now portrayed for all but like most accounts of bushranging adventures it is mixed with truth, legend and mystery.

In between all these activities Studdy-Clift, with a strong love of music, found time to teach the piano, organ and keyboard. At one time she even played for a choral group appropriately named the Condamine Belles.

Following Studdy-Clift's diagnosis with macular degeneration in the early 1990s, her sight has deteriorated to a world of blurred images and shapes with some very very minor peripheral vision. She treats her handicap as just another one of life's challenges and continues to undertake as many of her previous activities as possible. Unfortunately, she can no longer do her own illustrations. Cooking at times has provided an interesting interpretation of the menu with non-correct identification of critical ingredients!

Writing continued to be a passion for Studdy-Clift and she produced two books in 2009. The first chronicled the history of a small 1934 monoplane called St Paulus that started its flying life in the wild and rugged New Guinea mainland for a German-based Catholic mission and after many adventures and mishaps, including an attack by a Japanese Zero, the plane ended up in Australia. Passing through several owners and continuing to notch up some very interesting escapades the ‘Incredible Klemm” survives to this day as most likely the oldest mission plane in the world. Her second effort also came from New Guinea during World War II when, aided by an Aussie ex-pat, a group of five nuns walked for three months from the Sepik coast over some of the most rugged country on earth up the highlands to escape the Japanese. Titled, “When Nuns Wore Soldiers’ Trousers”, it reveals a tale of adventure and endurance known to few outside of PNG.

Studdy-Clift's final literary effort, an addendum to her Lady Bushranger book, provides an update of her continuing research and data collection on that subject since its original publication 15 years before. She feels her Lady Bushranger book will be perhaps her most lasting legacy and illustrates this by stating it has been under film options almost since its production.

Unfortunately now her failed sight has meant that she cannot carry on with her love of writing as she is unable to keep track of the continuity in presenting a story. Even in her senior years life is never dull for Pat as she often is presented as one of the Lismore City Library's Living Books that ‘readers’ borrow for half an hour before putting her back ‘on the shelf’!

When she was in her mid 80s, Studdy-Clift's mind is as sharp as ever and illustrating this point is the example of a recent conversation when it was stated that she was “visually impaired”. Her retort was that there was nothing wrong with the way she looked but she had trouble with her eyesight and so was actually “vision impaired”!

== Selected works ==
- Only our Gloves on (1981)
- The Many Faces of the Tweed (1984)
- The Many Faces of the Tweed II (1986)
- Bush Justice, with Ron Brown (1990)
- Darwin Dilemma, with Ron Brown (1992)
- The Lady Bushranger – the Life of Elizabeth Jessie Hickman, 1996 Hesperian Press, WA, ISBN 0-85905-223-0
- On The Banks of the Condamine (2000)
- On The Banks of the Condamine Revisited (2004)
- When Nuns Wore Soldiers’ Trousers (2009)
- The Incredible Klemm (2009)
- Lady Bushranger Truth, Mystery and Legend Grows (2011)
