= Mal Pearson =

American football coach (1923–2009)

Biographical details
- Born: February 23, 1923; Chicago, Illinois, U.S.
- Died: August 11, 2009 (aged 86); Manistee, Michigan, U.S.

Playing career

Football
- 1946–1949: Western Michigan
- Position: Tackle

Coaching career (HC unless noted)

Football
- 1950–1961: Manistee HS (MI)
- 1962–1965: Lakeview HS (MI)
- 1966–1968: Wheaton (IL) (line)
- 1969–1970: Wheaton (IL)

Basketball
- 1966–?: Wheaton (IL) (freshmen)

Head coaching record
- Overall: 4–13–1 (college)

Malcolm Paul Pearson (February 23, 1923 – August 11, 2009) was an American football coach. He served as the head football coach at Wheaton College in Wheaton, Illinois for two seasons, from 1969 to 1970, compiling a record of 4–13–1.

Pearson played high school football at Senn High School in Chicago before graduating in 1941. He earned all-city and all-state honors, and was named the most outstanding player in the Chicago public school league. Pearson served in the United States Navy during World War II on the USS Kasaan Bay. After the war, he played college football at Western Michigan College of Education—now known as Western Michigan University as a tackle before graduating in 1950.

Pearson began his coaching career in 1950 when was named football coach at Manistee High School in Manistee, Michigan. In 12 years at Manistee, he led his teams to a record of 61–37–5, and won one Class B state championship. In 1962, Pearson moved to Lakeview High School in Battle Creek, Michigan. He was head football coach there until 1966, when he was hired by Wheaton College as varsity football line coach, freshman basketball coach, and physical education instructor. In 1969, Pearson was promoted to head football coach at Wheaton, succeeding Jack Swartz. After winning only four games in two seasons, he was fired as Wheaton's head football coach, but remained an assistant professor of physical education at the school.

== Head coaching record ==
=== College ===
Year	Team	Overall	Conference	Standing	Bowl/playoffs
Wheaton Crusaders (NCAA College Division independent) (1969)
1969	Wheaton	3–6			
Wheaton Crusaders (College Conference of Illinois and Wisconsin) (1970)
1970	Wheaton	1–7–1	1–6–1	8th	
Wheaton:		4–13–1	1–6–1		
Total:		4–13–1			
