= Dave Gillespie (American football) =

American football coach

Coaching career (HC unless noted)
- 1925: Wheaton (IL)

Head coaching record
- Overall: 1–7

Dave Gillespie was an American football coach. He served as the head football coach at Wheaton College in Wheaton, Illinois for one season, in 1925, compiling a record of 1–7.

== Head coaching record ==
Year	Team	Overall	Conference	Standing	Bowl/playoffs
Wheaton Crusaders (Illinois Intercollegiate Athletic Conference) (1925)
1925	Wheaton	1–7	1–5	18th	
Wheaton:		1–7	1–5		
Total:		1–7			
