= Jack Clift =

American Composer and Music Producer

Background information
- Origin: Oklahoma City, Oklahoma (United States) USA
- Labels: Effigy Records
- Website: effigyrecords.net

Jack Clift (born September 15, 1955, in Oklahoma City, Oklahoma) is an American Composer and Music Producer. He is best known for his hybrid soundscapes combining elements of American folk music, jazz and bluegrass music with traditional instruments and singers from the many countries he has visited.

Clift's recordings feature virtuoso performances from Sardegna, Turkey, Corsica, Malta, and most notably Uzbekistan where he has been a part-time resident since 2004. That was when he co-founded the American-Uzbek musical group, Jadoo. Jadoo's members are Toir Kuziev, Utkur Kadirov, Otanazar Khudaynazarov, Olim Khakimov, Nodir Umarov, Abdulakhad Abdrashidov, Matrasul Matyokubov, Gulom Mukhamedjanov and other musical contributors.

Clift has had compositions licensed by ABC for the 1996 Summer Olympics ("Guitarland", title track of Los Angeles guitarist Tim Pierce's solo album) and the nationally syndicated radio program, Car Talk ("Borrowed Car", co-written with Tom Adler and title track of Adler's CD).

In September 2006, Clift met with John Carter Cash in Hendersonville, Tennessee where the two conceived an ambitious project melding the Central Asian influences of Jadoo with traditional American Mountain Music, including songs from the catalogue of the Carter Family. Clift then returned to Tashkent, Uzbekistan and met with Tatar guitarist Enver İzmaylov and the members of Jadoo for the first recording sessions of the project. Upon his return to the United States, he reconvened with Cash in Tennessee to begin introducing the contributions of mountain singer Ralph Stanley, recipient of the National Medal of Arts in 2006, country music icon Marty Stuart, The Peasall Sisters (O Brother, Where Art Thou?, Down from the Mountain), Randy Scruggs, Ronnie McCoury, John Cowan, Greg Leisz, and Ron Miles, thus forming the group Cedar Hill Refugees. This project, titled Pale Imperfect Diamond had a limited release in 2009. "Keys to the Kingdom", featuring Ralph Stanley, was chosen to be the first track on Coal Country Music, a compilation produced by Andy Mahler and Jason Wilber as a companion to the Sierra Club film Coal Country.

A second Jadoo album, And Darkling Waters Flow, was also released in 2009. This beat-oriented instrumental album features the guitar work of longtime collaborator Tim Pierce.

In June 2009, Clift was invited to perform with Jadoo for an episode of PBS travel series Rudy Maxa's World, working with travel guru Rudy Maxa and Emmy award-winning director Sue McNally. Jadoo not only performs live, but selections from various Jadoo CDs are featured prominently throughout the episode. Continuing this collaboration, Clift, Maxa, and McNally have begun developing a concert documentary that will bring the musicians of these two great traditions together for a concert.

2009 also brought the online pre-release of Horses Fleet as Wind, a collection of live studio improvisations featuring Jadoo with special guests Enver İzmaylov, and Vitaliy Papelov. This title is currently available only as a download from the Effigy Records website but rumors of a pending packaged commercial release persist.

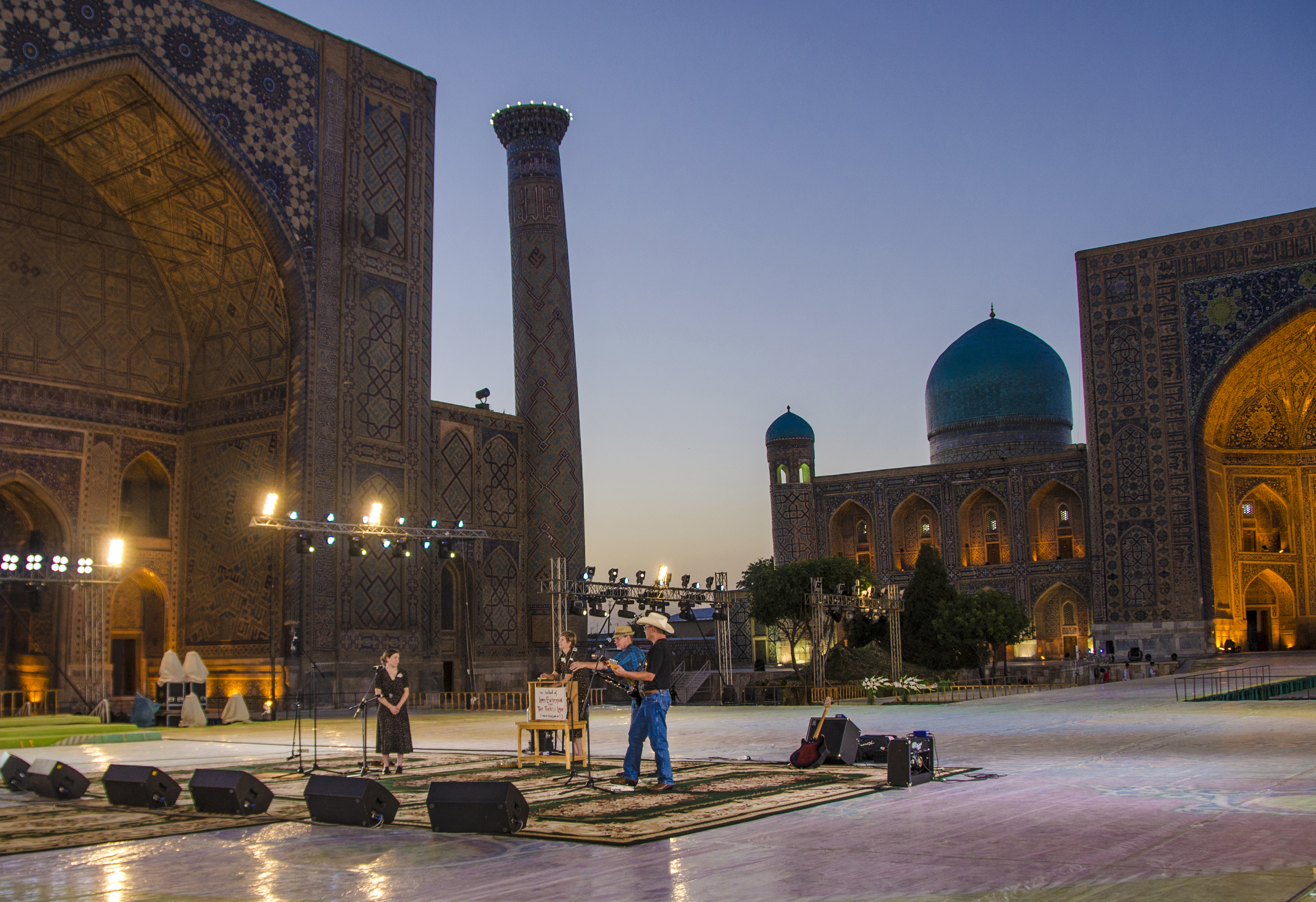
Cedar Hill Refugees perform in the Registan, Samarkand, Uzbekistan at Sharq Taronalari Festival 2013.

In 2013 Clift led a group of American musicians – Anna & Elizabeth and Brad Houser (Edie Brickell & New Bohemians) – to represent the United States in the Sharq Taronalari music festival in Samarkand, Uzbekistan.

The third Jadoo album entitled Danza Tigresa was completed in 2016 and was coproduced by longtime Clift associate, drummer and photographer, Dony Wynn (Robert Palmer, Chaka Khan, Robert Plant, Brooks & Dunn). The album was mixed by engineer, Jason Corsaro, 1959-2017 (David Bowie, Peter Gabriel, Madonna, Moby, Rolling Stones) in Lake Hopatcong, NJ, and includes a cover of the song Cheyah by Australian Electronic Music composer/producer, Mr Bill, adapted for Clift’s Uzbek/American ensemble.

Currently, Clift and John Carter Cash are in the production of the Cedar Hill Refugees album featuring Ralph Stanley, The Peasall Sisters, Marty Stuart, Bill Miller (musician), Jeff Taylor, Rebekah Del Rio, Ana Cristina and John Cowan are again featured as well as several new guest collaborators: Jerry Douglas, Bela Fleck, Rosanne Cash, Sam Bush, bluegrass singer Dave Evans (bluegrass) and acclaimed Virginia traditional singer, Elizabeth LaPrelle.

== Discography ==
- Danza Tigresa (2016)
- Horses Fleet as Wind (2009)
- And Darkling Waters Flow (2008)
- Pale Imperfect Diamond (2008)
- Prairie Fire (2006)
- A Parade for the Fallen (2004)
- The Earlyears (2003)
- The Secret Histories (2001)
- From A Window Black as Rain (1997)
- On a Bright, Bright Morning (1993)

== Awards ==
- 1998 New Mexico Music Industry Awards (Best Producer)
- 1998 New Mexico Music Industry Awards (Best Musical Production Original Modern Classical Genre )
- 1998 New Mexico Music Industry Awards (Best Musical Production Eclectic)
- 1997 New Mexico Music Industry Awards (Best Musical Production Mainstream Rock)
- 1997 New Mexico Music Industry Awards (Best Musical Production Metal)
- 1997 New Mexico Music Industry Awards (Best Musical Production Adult Contemporary)
- 1993 New Mexico Music Industry Awards (Best Musical Production Acoustic/Folk)
- 1992 New Mexico Music Industry Awards (Best Musical Production Single)
- 1992 New Mexico Music Industry Awards (Best Musical Production Alternative/Modern)
- 1988 New Mexico Music Industry Awards (Best Musical Production Best Producer)
- 1988 New Mexico Music Industry Awards (Best Musical Production Best of Show)

== Notable Collaborators ==
- Tim Pierce
- Alan Pasqua
- Enver İzmaylov
- John Carter Cash
- John Cowan
- Ralph Stanley
- Ronnie McCoury
- Jeff Beal
- Edgar Meyer
- Marty Stuart
- Jerry Douglas
- Bela Fleck
- Rosanne Cash
