= Ed Coray =

American sports coach (1901–1993)

Biographical details
- Born: August 24, 1901; Rhode Island, U.S.
- Died: January 2, 1993 (aged 91); Wheaton, Illinois, U.S.

Coaching career (HC unless noted)

Football
- 1926–1928: Wheaton (IL)

Basketball
- 1926–1936: Wheaton (IL)
- 1943–1951: Wheaton (IL)

Baseball
- 1927–1936: Wheaton (IL)
- 1941–1944: Wheaton (IL)

Administrative career (AD unless noted)
- ?–1951: Wheaton (IL)

Head coaching record
- Overall: 5–14–3 (football); 227–143 (basketball); 56–111–2 (baseball)

Edward Atherton Coray (August 24, 1901 – January 2, 1993) was an American college football, college basketball and college baseball coach. He was the head football coach at Wheaton College in Wheaton, Illinois for three seasons, from 1926 to 1928, compiling a record of 5–14–3. Coray served two stints as head basketball coach at Wheaton, from 1926 to 1936 and 1943 to 1951, tallying a mark of 227–143 in 17 seasons. He also had two stints as the school's head baseball coach, from 1927 to 1936 and 1941 to 1944, amassing a record of 56–111–2. In addition, Corey was Wheaton's athletic director until 1951, when has promoted to executive secretary of the college. He was succeeded as head of the athletic department by Harvey Chrouser.

Coray died on January 2, 1993.

== Head coaching record ==
=== Football ===
Year	Team	Overall	Conference	Standing	Bowl/playoffs
Wheaton Crusaders (Illinois Intercollegiate Athletic Conference) (1926–1928)
1926	Wheaton	0–6–1	0–3–1	19th	
1927	Wheaton	2–4–1	0–2	20th	
1928	Wheaton	3–4–1	0–2–1	T–19th	
Wheaton:		5–14–3	0–7–2		
Total:		5–14–3			
