= Clift Schimmels =

American football coach, Baptist speaker, and educator (1937–2001)

Cliff Schimmels
Biographical details
- Born: May 11, 1937; Arapaho, Oklahoma, U.S.
- Died: May 9, 2001 (aged 63)

Coaching career (HC unless noted)
- 1980: Wheaton (IL)

Head coaching record
- Overall: 2–7

Clifford Dean Schimmels (May 11, 1937 – May 9, 2001) was an American football coach, Baptist speaker, educator. He served as chaplain to the Chicago Cubs and Chicago White Sox while also a professor at Wheaton College and Lee University.

== Early life, education, and family ==
Schimmels was born in 1937 in Arapaho, Oklahoma. He attended Oklahoma Baptist University in Shawnee, Oklahoma. He later earned a master's degree from Southwestern Oklahoma State University in Weatherford, Oklahoma. He earned his PhD at the University of Oklahoma in 1973.

While a student at Oklahoma Baptist, Schimmels met and married fellow student, Mary Wade. They had three children: Paula, Larry, and Kristina. Schimmels also had four grandchildren: Alyssa, Ann, Delaney, and Will.

== Coaching career ==
Schimmels was the head football coach for the Wheaton College in Wheaton, Illinois. He held that position for the 1980 season. His coaching record at Wheaton was 2–7.

== Head coaching record ==
Year	Team	Overall	Conference	Standing	Bowl/playoffs
Wheaton Crusaders (College Conference of Illinois and Wisconsin) (1980)
1979	Wheaton	2–7	1–7	T–8th	
Wheaton:		2–7	1–7		
Total:		2–7			
