= Jack Conley (American football) =

American football, basketball, and baseball coach

Coaching career (HC unless noted)

Football
- 1922–1924: Wheaton (IL)

Basketball
- 1922–1924: Wheaton (IL)

Baseball
- 1923–1924: Wheaton (IL)

Head coaching record
- Overall: 8–11–2 (football); 12–13 (basketball); 3–12 (baseball)

John F. Conley was an American football, basketball, and baseball coach. He served as the head football coach at Wheaton College in Wheaton, Illinois for three seasons, from 1922 to 1924, compiling a record of 8–11–2. He resigned as coach at Wheaton in October 1925.

== Head coaching record ==
=== Football ===
Year	Team	Overall	Conference	Standing	Bowl/playoffs
Wheaton Crusaders (Illinois Intercollegiate Athletic Conference) (1922–1924)
1922	Wheaton	2–5	0–3		
1923	Wheaton	2–3–2	0–1–1	21st	
1924	Wheaton	4–3	3–2	T–8th	
Wheaton:		8–11–2	3–6–1		
Total:		8–11–2			
