= Gary Taylor (journalist) =

American journalist and author (born 1947)

- Born: Gary Dale Taylor; March 4, 1947
- Occupation: journalist

Gary Dale Taylor (born March 4, 1947) is an American journalist and author best known for reporting for newspapers and magazines from Houston, Texas, since 1971 and for the attempt on his life in 1980 by controversial Texas attorney Catherine Mehaffey Shelton. He recorded his recollection of that event in an award-winning 2008 memoir entitled Luggage By Kroger.

== Roots ==
Gary Taylor is the only son and oldest of three children born in St. Louis, Missouri, to Dale and Rheva (Wright) Taylor, who had left the farmlands of Central Missouri during the Great Depression to seek opportunities in the nearest big city. Despite a lack of formal education beyond elementary school, Dale Taylor became a successful entrepreneur in St. Louis after World War II, creating the city's largest business for sales and service of gasoline-powered lawnmowers as that industry grew increasingly important in American culture. Rheva (Wright) Taylor was a homemaker until her death in 1981. Dale Taylor died in 1984. Gary Taylor's younger sister, Brenda, is an assistant US Attorney in Denver, Colorado, and another sister, Sherri, works in the banking industry in St. Louis.

== Education ==
Taylor was educated in St. Louis-area public schools, graduating in 1965 from Pattonville High School in St. Ann, Missouri. He then attended the University of Missouri at Columbia, graduating in 1969 with a Bachelor of Journalism degree from that university's School of Journalism. The university honored him with the Walter Williams Award, given annually to the graduating student deemed the "outstanding writer" at the Missouri School of Journalism.

== Newspaper career ==
Upon graduation from college, Taylor began his journalism career as a reporter in Flint, Michigan, for the Flint Journal, where he covered the Genesee County Courthouse and legal affairs for that paper until December 1971. He left Flint to take a job with The Houston Post, where he remained until August 1980. During his years at The Houston Post, Taylor covered a wide range of stories and beats, but focused primarily on police, the Texas prison system, criminal courts and legal affairs. In 1976 the paper nominated him for the Pulitzer Prize, recognizing his work on a series of stories that resulted in the release of an aged inmate from the Texas prison system. And, in 1978 he shared the Texas UPI Enterprise Reporting award with another Post reporter for work on a series of articles exposing police corruption in the Houston suburb of Jacinto City. While serving as the paper's beat reporter at the Harris County Criminal Courthouse between 1977 and 1980, Taylor covered dozens of capital murder trials. Taylor's byline also appeared in the Post's coverage of a number of historically significant Texas legal events, including coverage of the 1974 Huntsville Prison Siege standoff between officials and inmates at the Huntsville Unit of the Texas prison system; the 1977 trial of Houston police officers accused in the racially charged death of a Hispanic laborer; and, one of the trials of Fort Worth tycoon T. Cullen Davis.

== Freelance Journalist ==
Taylor resigned from The Houston Post in August 1980 to begin the second phase of his journalism career, self-employed as a freelancer in Houston. This phase would last 17 years. During his freelance career, Taylor held contract positions with four national publications. He was responsible for coverage of Texas courts and legal affairs for the National Law Journal (1986–1997). He covered financial affairs as the Houston correspondent for Money magazine (1983–1997). He covered trade and business news for The Journal of Commerce (1985–1997). And, he covered the oil and gas industry for the AAPG Explorer, the official publication of the American Association of Petroleum Geologists (1980–1997). Taylor also served as a stringer for the Houston Bureau of Time magazine. In addition, Taylor researched, wrote and sold hundreds of articles to many other publications on a wide range of subjects from medical technology to sports and general interest. A short summary of some of his articles is available on his personal Web site, "Taylor's Hole in the Web." Besides reporting for magazines and newspapers, Taylor also researched and wrote four books during these years. One was a coffee table book about the city of Houston entitled Gateway to the Future, produced as a marketing project for the publisher. The second was a book about the history of the Federal Reserve System (ISBN 1-55546-136-0), written as a contract assignment for that publisher. The third was a privately financed corporate history of a Houston industrial gases company named Big Three Industries. And the fourth was written for a client who retained him to ghost a memoir about the client's experiences as a Vietnam refugee and undercover drug investigator. Called China Green, the book was never published.

== Trade Press ==
In 1997, Taylor began the current phase of his journalism career, working full-time as a staffer for two international business publications. From June 1997 until April 2004, Taylor covered the international chemical industry as deputy editor for the Reed Elsevier online news site, Chemical News & Intelligence (CNI). And, since April 2004, Taylor has covered the oil and gas business for Platts Oilgram News, a daily newsletter published by the McGraw-Hill Companies. At CNI, Taylor functioned as a wire service reporter and editor in the Houston bureau of that pioneering Web-based publication while traveling widely to cover the chemical industry. In February 2001, CNI assigned him to spend six weeks reorganizing the network's Singapore news bureau. Other overseas assignments for CNI took him to Vienna, Monte Carlo and Rio de Janeiro. As senior writer in the Houston bureau of Platts Oilgram News, Taylor covers all aspects of the US oil and gas business including corporate earnings for more than 80 companies, oilfield discoveries, exploration in the Gulf of Mexico and merger-acquisitions activities. Taylor's experiences covering courts and legal affairs also has proved useful at Oilgram News, where he has had occasion to handle several high-profile legal stories from the energy industry. In 2004 he covered the unsuccessful attempt by US executives of Russian oil company Yukos to prosecute a Chapter 11 bankruptcy filing in Houston. In 2006 he covered the investigation into a $70 million embezzlement by the chief financial officer of a Texas contract drilling company. And, also in 2006, Taylor covered one of the criminal trials of former Enron chief executive Ken Lay.

== Memoir of Fatal Attraction Notoriety ==
Despite his lengthy journalism career, Taylor likely has received more notoriety for a well-publicized attempt on his life that occurred in 1980 while working as a reporter for The Houston Post. The story of the events leading to that attempt has been optioned twice for treatment as movies, recreated on television, reported widely in newspaper and magazine articles and prompted appearances by Taylor in 1987 on a number of television interview programs including Oprah Winfrey, Regis and Kathie Lee and Sally Jessy Raphael. Taylor recounted his personal story of those events in his 2008 book, Luggage By Kroger: A True Crime Memoir. The book has been recognized with awards from three national small press true crime book contests. It won the Silver Medal in the 2009 Independent Publisher Book Awards (IPPYs), the Bronze Medal in ForeWord Magazine's 2008 Book-of-the-Year Awards and was a finalist in the true crime category of the 2009 National Indie Excellence Awards. The book also was a finalist for ForeWord Magazine's 2008 Book-of-the-Year. Taylor shared details of his writing process in a June 2009 interview with the online journal The New Criminologist. The news of his book also was covered in a feature article in April 2009 by the Houston Chronicle.

=== Backstory ===
Taylor's trail toward Fatal Attraction notoriety started in 1979 when he began a short-lived romantic relationship with a female Houston attorney named Catherine Mehaffey that eventually led to her conviction in the January 1980 attempt on his life. They met while he was estranged from his second wife and she was under investigation in the still-unsolved murder earlier that year of George Tedesco, a Houston doctor she had sued for divorce under a claim they had been in a common-law marriage. After Tedesco's death, Mehaffey had filed for his estate, claiming status as his widow and sparking a trial in Harris County Probate Court where Tedesco's family challenged her claim. As the courts reporter for The Houston Post, Taylor met Mehaffey just before that probate trial began in September 1979. By March 1980, she was on trial for attempted murder in an unsuccessful attempt to shoot him after their relationship ended. Although convicted in the assault on Taylor and suspended from the practice of law, Mehaffey later regained her license and practiced law again in Dallas under the name Catherine Shelton. In Dallas, she became embroiled in an unrelated 1999 murder investigation that culminated with the conviction of her husband and sparked a new round of publicity about her career.

=== Fanfare ===
The Taylor-Mehaffey Houston story generated its first feature length story in 1981 when the Westward Sunday magazine of The Dallas Times Herald published a cover feature by noted freelancer Hugh Aynesworth. It then gained more prominent national attention in 1987 in the wake of popularity for the hit movie Fatal Attraction, starring Michael Douglas and Glenn Close. Capitalizing on the movie's theme about an adulterous affair that ends in violence, People magazine included a summary of the Taylor-Mehaffey relationship in an October 26, 1987 cover article about the movie's real life implications. Entitled "The Dark Side of Love," the People article probed the universal themes of Fatal Attraction in an effort to demonstrate how "Real Life Stories Show Why This Season's Hottest Movie Is Hitting Home." The Oprah Winfrey Show invited Taylor to appear on a similarly themed presentation as an interview subject for true-life fatal attractions and the dangers of obsessive relationships. After Oprah, Taylor appeared on several other shows and saw his story recreated in brief documentary form in 1988 for a prime-time ABC network television special entitled Crimes of Passion and hosted by the actor James Woods. Taylor also agreed to the first of what would be two options on the story for treatment as a television docudrama, although this first deal in 1988 failed to culminate with a production. In his memoir, Taylor cited the fanfare of those years in describing himself as "the poster boy for true-life fatal attractions."

=== New Prominence ===
The Taylor-Mehaffey story found new prominence in 1999 when Mehaffey attracted media attention in Dallas as attorney Catherine Shelton during the investigation into the murder of a business associate's husband. The Dallas Morning News, the Houston Press and the Dallas Observer newspapers included reports of the 1979-80 Taylor-Mehaffey affair as background in the 1999 Dallas murder investigation. In its January 13, 2000, story, headlined "Love Hurts," the Houston Press summarized her career: "Six of her ex-lovers or associates are wounded or dead. Authorities wonder if old ways die hard for former Houston attorney Catherine Mehaffey Shelton." The CBS network news magazine 48 Hours included lengthy interviews with Taylor and Mehaffey-Shelton in a June 23, 2004 program entitled "The Law and Mrs. Shelton." And the A&E network's American Justice true crime television series also produced a segment on the cases, including another interview with Taylor. A&E called its production: "Under Suspicion: The Case of Catherine Shelton." All this publicity prompted a second option from Hollywood, which this time resulted in the 2004 production of a movie initially called Heartless, starring Melanie Griffith and Esai Morales as characters based on Shelton and Taylor. Taylor’s 2008 memoir deals only with the earlier events of 1979 and 1980 in Houston.

== Family life ==
Taylor has been married and divorced twice. He has two grown daughters and three grandsons from the second marriage, which figured prominently as a prelude to his ill-fated 1979 relationship with Mehaffey.
