= John D. Conley House =

- U.S. National Register of Historic Places
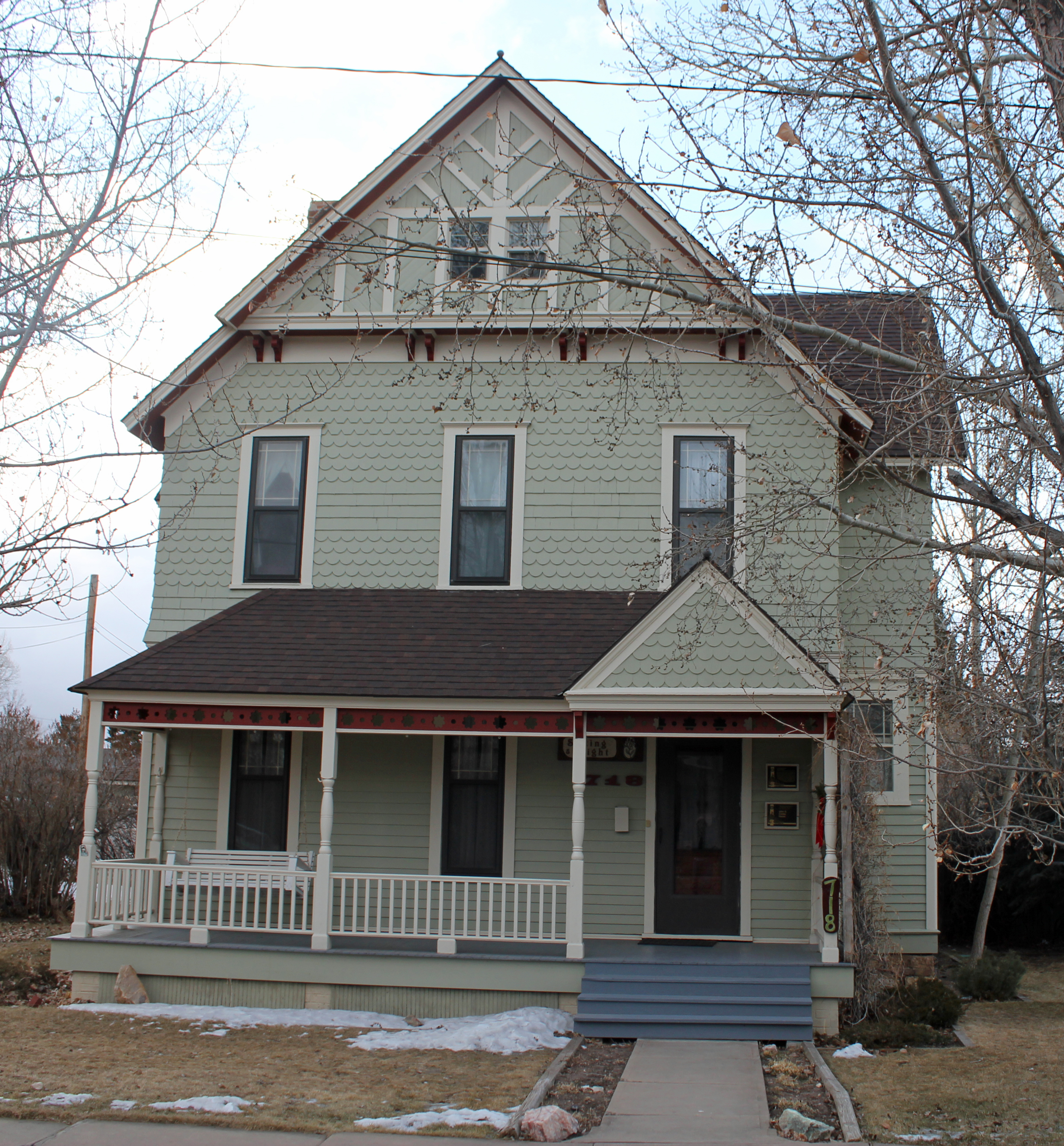

- Location within Wyoming
- Location: 718 Ivinson Street, Laramie, Wyoming
- Coordinates: 41°18′41″N 105°35′14″W
- Area: less than one acre
- Built: 1888
- Architectural style: Late Victorian
- NRHP reference No.: 80004299
- Added to NRHP: May 15, 1980

The John D. Conley House was built in 1888 in Laramie, Wyoming for University of Wyoming professor John Dykeman Conley (1843–1926). In 1890 Conley became acting president of the university, serving until 1891 when he reverted to a professorship and sold the house to an eventual president, Elmer E. Smiley. Smiley served from 1898 to 1903, selling the house in 1903 to C.D. Spalding, president of the Albany National Bank. The Spalding family sold the house in 1924 to the Wyoming Diocese of the Episcopal Church, who owned it until 1946. From 1946 it was owned by Christenna Christensen, who operated it as a boarding house. In 1966 it became a private residence.

The two-story wood-frame Victorian style house is about 31 feet (9.4 m) wide and 45 feet (14 m) deep. It has three porches and detailing resembling half-timbering at the attic level. There are four main rooms downstairs and five bedrooms upstairs.

The Conley House was placed on the National Register of Historic Places on May 15, 1980.
