= James Shannon Clift =

Canadian politician

James Shannon Clift (March 5, 1814 – July 16, 1877) was a merchant and political figure in Newfoundland.

Clift was born in St. John's in 1814 to James and Flora Clift. His father was also a merchant. He operated a commission merchant and ship brokerage business in partnership with James B. Woods, his brother-in-law. He was district grand master for the Freemasons from 1871 to 1877. He was a member of the Legislative Council from 1861 to 1874 and served in the Executive Council from 1870 to 1874.

Clift died in St. John's in 1877.
