= Wheaton Thunder football =

- First season: 1914
- Head coach: Jesse Scott; 6th season, 48–12 (.800)
- Location: Wheaton, Illinois
- Stadium: McCully Stadium (capacity: 4,100)
- NCAA division: Division III
- Conference: CCIW
- Colors: Blue and Orange
- Mascot: Thunder
- Website: Wheaton Football

The Wheaton Thunder football represents Wheaton College, located in Wheaton, Illinois, in NCAA Division III college football. The Thunder, who began playing football in 1914, compete as members of the College Conference of Illinois and Wisconsin (CCIW).

Wheaton's home games are played at McCully Stadium.

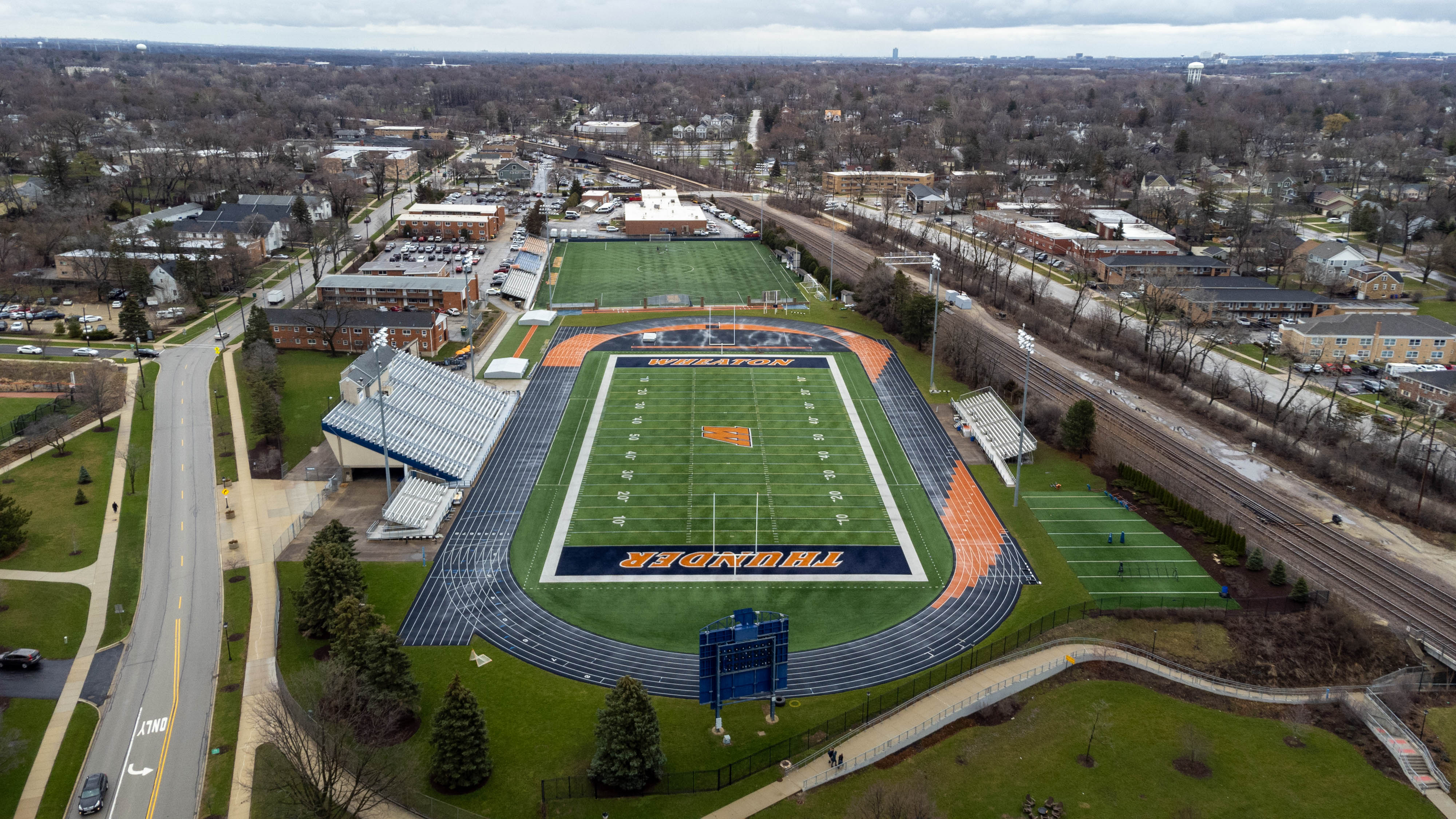
An aerial view of the Wheaton Thunder's football stadium

The school's football team is coached by Jesse Scott, who has taken the team to the NCAA Division III Football Championship playoffs three times. The team was previously coached by Mike Swider, who has taken the team to the playoffs nine times.

== History ==
In 2008, Andy Studebaker was selected in the NFL draft by the Philadelphia Eagles; he subsequently signed with the Kansas City Chiefs.

In March 2018, Charles Nagy, a former Wheaton College football player, sued the college and seven former teammates citing the school had attempted to cover up a hazing incident by his former teammates. In 2016, Nagy was kidnapped and beaten by his former teammates before being left on the baseball field in the middle of the night half-naked. Nagy was admitted to a nearby hospital and was diagnosed with two labrum tears requiring surgery. Despite the controversy, three players involved were allowed to compete in the next football game. Nagy alleged that the college administration was aware of the tradition of hazing on the team, but took no action. Wheaton faced additional controversy when it issued a public statement condemning hazing but hired a third-party investigator to discredit Nagy's account of the incident. Ultimately, all five players involved in the hazing pled guilty.
