= 2026 Schreiner Mountaineers football team =

American college football season

2026 Schreiner Mountaineers football
- Conference: American Southwest Conference
- Record: 3–7 (0–5 ASC)
- Head coach: Keith Allen (1st season)
- Offensive coordinator: David Jones (1st season)
- Offensive scheme: Multiple spread
- Defensive coordinator: Shane Hallmark (1st season)
- Base defense: Multiple
- Home stadium: Antler Stadium

2026 American Southwest Conference football standings
	Conf.			Overall
Team	W		L	W		L
No. 6 Hardin–Simmons	4	–	0	8	–	0
No. 15 Mary Hardin–Baylor	4	–	0	8	–	1
McMurry	2	–	2	5	–	4
Howard Payne	1	–	3	5	–	3
East Texas Baptist	1	–	3	3	–	6
Schreiner	0	–	4	3	–	6
$ – Conference champion; ^ – NCAA Division III playoff participant; As of November 15, 2026; Rankings from D3football.com

The 2026 Schreiner Mountaineers football team represented Schreiner University as a member of the American Southwest Conference (ASC) during the 2026 NCAA Division III football season. Led by first-year head coach Keith Allen, the Mountaineers played home games at Antler Stadium in Kerrville, Texas.

== Background ==
In 2024, Schreiner University announced the return of its football program, last fielding a team in 1956 as a junior college team; the Mountaineers played an exhibition schedule in 2025 with the 2026 season being the team's first full season since the program's return, with Kerrville Independent School District's Antler Stadium serving as the Mountaineers' home stadium.

New England Nor'easters defensive coordinator Kenneth Treschitta was named the Mountaineer's head coach on July 3, 2024. In February 2025, Treschitta stepped down for unknown reasons with Klein High School offensive coordinator Keith Allen being named the Mountaineers' new head coach. On March 7, 2025, Klein head coach Shane Hallmark was hired as the Mountaineers' defensive coordinator, with Allen having served under Hallmark while at Klein. Former Tivy High School head coach David Jones was hired as the team's offensive coordinator later that month on March 25.

== ASC prediction poll ==
The American Southwest Conference released its preseason prediction poll on August 18, 2026. The Mountaineers were predicted to finish 6th (last) in the conference.

== Schedule ==
Date	Time	Opponent	Site	Result	Attendance
September 5	6:00 p.m.	Austin*	Antler Stadium; Kerrville, TX	W 33–27	2,506
September 12	6:00 p.m.	at Oklahoma Panhandle State*	Carl Wooten Field; Goodwell, OK	L 29–47	983
September 19	6:00 p.m.	Southwestern (TX)*	Antler Stadium; Kerrville, TX	W 31–28	2,300
September 26	6:00 p.m.	at Centenary*	Atkins Field; Shreveport, LA	W 14–7	345
October 3	6:00 p.m.	Hendrix*	Antler Stadium; Kerrville, TX	L 42–49	2,050
October 10	1:00 p.m.	at East Texas Baptist	Ornelas Stadium; Marshall, TX	L 28–62	1,703
October 17	2:00 p.m.	Howard Payne	Antler Stadium; Kerrville, TX	L 21–41	1,650
October 31	1:00 p.m.	at No. 17 Mary Hardin–Baylor	Crusader Stadium; Belton, TX	L 7–66	N/A
November 7	1:00 p.m.	at No. 6 Hardin–Simmons	Shelton Stadium; Abilene, TX	L 0–67	3,131
November 14	2:00 p.m.	McMurry	Antler Stadium; Kerrville, TX	L 26–37	1,100
*Non-conference game; Rankings from D3football.com Poll released prior to the game; All times are in Central time

== Personnel ==
2026 Schreiner Mountaineers football team roster
Players
Coaches
Offense

Pos.	#	Name	Class
QB	1	Isaac Ponce	Jr
QB	2	Gibby Alvarado	Fr
WR	3	Ethan Colida	Jr
QB	4	Jett Flores	Fr
WR	5	Joseph Leal	Fr
WR	6	Mar'kel Ford	So
WR	7	Derrick Gray	So
RB	8	Christian Lora	So
QB	9	Ezra Morgan	So
RB	10	Will Spaulding	So
QB	11	Jacari Killingsworth	Jr
QB	12	Major Luna	Fr
WR	13	Carson Jones	So
QB	14	Maxwell Smith	So
WR	15	Cade Jones	So
QB	16	Xavier Gonzalez	Fr
QB	17	J. D. Linnstaedter	Fr
QB	18	Alexander Manning	Fr
WR	19	Isaac Torres	So
WR	20	Benjamin Hatcher	Fr
RB	21	Tylor Simpson	So
WR	22	Nicholas Hall	So
RB	23	Domynik Vasquez	So
RB	24	Jason Ortiz	Fr
RB	25	Tyler Gilmore	Fr
WR	26	Julian Johnson	Fr
RB	27	Aiden Martinez	Fr
RB	28	Peyton Lopez	Fr
RB	29	Marcos Salas	Fr
RB	32	Traey Alvarado	Fr
RB	33	Aidan Varwig	So
TE	34	Cole Hirsch	So
WR	37	Isahia Hinds	Fr
RB	41	Theodis Fields	Fr
TE	44	Mason Madtes	Fr
RB	48	Julius Johnson	So
OL	50	Hayden Donovan	Fr
OL	51	Ja'mari Cooper	Fr
OL	52	Tory Iles	Fr
OL	53	Ethan Jones	So
OL	54	Maximus Jackson	Fr
OL	55	Kaleb Gowens	Fr
OL	56	Dakota Marak	Fr
OL	57	Luke Freeman	Fr
OL	58	Matthew Howard	Fr
OL	59	Noah Jenkins	Fr
OL	60	Logan Reed	Fr
OL	61	David Bryson	Fr
OL	62	Kaleb Merchant	So
OL	63	Alexander Vick	Fr
OL	64	Christopher Alva	Fr
OL	65	Nathaniel Evans	Fr
OL	67	Logan Harman	Fr
OL	68	Evan Guardiola	So
OL	69	Michael Gonzales	Fr
OL	70	Isaiah Walker-Lopez	Fr
OL	71	Layton Kopycinski	Fr
OL	72	Erik Sanchez	Fr
OL	73	James McKinney	Fr
OL	74	Omar Williams	Fr
OL	75	Talon Brengman	Fr
OL	76	Jaquan Justice	Fr
OL	77	Javian Charles	Fr
OL	78	Thor Bass	Fr
OL	79	Mohamed Ndiaye	Fr
WR	80	Alejandro Rodriguez	Fr
WR	81	President Calamaco	Fr
WR	82	Isaiah Cathey	Fr
WR	83	Cash Myers	Fr
WR	84	DeMarcus Davis	Fr
WR	87	Jamari Klembara-Chilton	Fr
WR	88	Bryson Edmon	Fr
WR	89	Shaun Evans	Fr
TE	99	Francisco Munoz	Fr

Defense

Pos.	#	Name	Class
CB	1	Braylen South	Fr
DE	2	Darren Hurtado	Fr
ILB	3	Triston Wilson	Fr
OLB	4	Travis Johnson	Fr
DE	5	Vamaur Johnson	So
ILB	6	Kobi Fears	So
CB	7	Casen Warren	Fr
DL	8	Markhas Rose	So
OLB	9	Luke Burkhalter	Fr
ILB	10	Vincent Reyes	So
DE	11	Caleb Sosa	So
DB	12	Gabriel Collins	Fr
DB	13	Marcus Troy	Fr
OLB	14	Re Char Robinson	Fr
OLB	15	Xavier Vincent	Fr
DB	16	Brady Criswell	So
DB	17	Cameron Floyd	Fr
DE	19	Devonte Mckenzie	So
CB	20	John Medaris	So
DB	21	Major Holland	So
ILB	22	Andrew Henley	Fr
DB	23	Zakary Blanchard	Fr
OLB	24	Marcus Potts	Fr
DB	25	Colby Morgan	Fr
CB	26	Jameriest Williams	Fr
DB	27	Devin Eure	So
CB	28	Bubba Medrano	Fr
ILB	30	Peculiar Henry	Fr
CB	31	Jaydon Hallock	Fr
DB	32	Kaden Williams	Fr
DB	35	Davis Holladay	Fr
DB	36	Jailynn Davis	Fr
CB	37	Cedrick Jones	Fr
CB	38	Nicholas Hayes	Fr
DB	39	Javien Grant	Fr
LB	40	Wyatt Porowski	Fr
DE	41	Ellis Rodgers	Fr
DB	42	Kenneth Peck Jr.	Fr
OLB	43	Kolton Strey	Fr
DE	44	Christian Doiron	So
OLB	45	Tobi Oladeinde	Fr
ILB	47	Ty Weaver	Fr
DE	48	Lawrence Carter	Fr
ILB	50	Adrian Agbasoga	Fr
DL	52	Jason Delossantos	Fr
ILB	53	Orlando Martinez	Fr
DL	54	Lamar Fields	Fr
ILB	55	Luke Lorenzan	Fr
DL	56	Nicholas McPherson	Fr
DL	58	Caden Lieck	Fr
DL	63	Michael Torres	So
DL	70	Brandon Castenada	Sr
DE	80	Henry Hughes	Fr
DB	83	Cash Myers	Fr
DL	88	Malachi Brooks-Hoodye	So
DE	89	Jared Martinez	Fr
DE	90	Joaquin Martinez	So
DE	91	Dominic Davis	Fr
ILB	92	Ja'kiree Teal	Fr
DE	93	Dylan Daniels	Fr
DE	96	Jonah Kalu	Fr
DE	99	Christopher Gonzalez	So

Special teams

Pos.	#	Name	Class
K	18	Bryce Warren	So
K	29	Sebastian Perez	Fr
K	33	Corin Ramesar	Fr
K	34	Cameron McGinnis	Fr
LS	46	Johnny Guajardo	Fr
LS	71	Joseph Stall	Fr
LS	72	Luke Silguero	Fr

Head coach

- Keith Allen

Coordinators/assistant coaches

- David Jones
  Offensive coordinator
- Shane Hallmark
  Defensive coordinator
- Cody Zwernemann
  Offensive line
- Chris Biggurs
  Defensive line

Legend

- (C) Team captain
- (S) Suspended
- (I) Ineligible
- Injured
- Redshirt

Roster
Last update: August 31, 2026

== Game summaries ==
=== Austin ===
Austin Kangaroos at Schreiner Mountaineers – Game summary

Quarter	1	2	3	4	Total
Kangaroos	7	7	7	6	27
Mountaineers	13	7	0	13	33

at Antler Stadium, Kerrville, Texas

- Date: September 5
- Game time: 6:00 p.m. CDT
- Game weather: Sunny
- Game attendance: 2,506
- Referee: Eric Smith
- Box score, Recap

Game information
First quarter
- SU – Christian Lora 8-yard run (Bryce Warren kick), 13:03. Mountaineers 7–0. Drive: 5 plays, 63 yards, 1:34.
- AC – Zyan Stewart 1-yard run (Alex McGregor kick), 11:04. Tied 7–7. Drive: 3 plays, 74 yards, 1:44.
- SU – Aidan Varwig 2-yard run (kick failed), 7:57. Mountaineers 13–7. Drive: 8 plays, 90 yards, 2:53.

Second quarter

- AC – Vincent Aparacio 8-yard pass from Leyton Riviere (Alex McGregor kick), 2:12. Kangaroos 14–13. Drive: 14 plays, 83 yards, 8:21.
- SU – Javien Grant 17-yard run (Bryce Warren kick), 1:07. Mountaineers 20–14. Drive: 5 plays, 63 yards, 0:58.

Third quarter

- AC – Jermiah Johnson 40-yard pass from Leyton Riviere (Alex McGregor kick), 12:57. Kangaroos 21–20. Drive: 4 plays, 73 yards, 1:48.

Fourth quarter

- AC – Alex McGregor 38-yard field goal, 14:13. Kangaroos 24–20. Drive: 6 plays, 54 yards, 3:04.
- SU – Isaac Ponce 4-yard run (Bryce Warren kick), 10:07. Mountaineers 27–24. Drive: 11 plays, 92 yards, 3:42.
- SU – Ethan Collida 15-yard pass from Isaac Ponce (kick failed), 1:44. Mountaineers 33–24. Drive: 11 plays, 81 yards, 4:46.
- AC – Alex McGregor 27-yard field goal, 0:38. Mountaineers 33–27. Drive: 7 plays, 37 yards, 0:57.

Statistics	AC	SU
First downs	22	24
Total yards	443	459
Rushing yards	127	211
Passing yards	316	248
Turnovers	0	0
Time of possession	36:19	23:41

Team	Category	Player	Statistics
Austin	Passing	Leyton Riviere	15/25, 316 yards, 2 TD
Austin	Rushing	Zyan Stewart	20 rushes, 80 yards, TD
Austin	Receiving	Vincent Aparicio	4 receptions, 119 yards, TD
Schreiner	Passing	Isaac Ponce	14/18, 183 yards, TD
Schreiner	Rushing	Isaac Ponce	13 rushes, 55 yards, TD
Schreiner	Receiving	President Calamaco	6 receptions, 103 yards

=== At Oklahoma Panhandle State ===
Schreiner Mountaineers at Oklahoma Panhandle State Aggies – Game summary

Quarter	1	2	3	4	Total
Mountaineers	0	8	0	21	29
Aggies	7	14	12	14	47

at Carl Wooten Field, Goodwell, Oklahoma

- Date: September 12
- Game time: 6:00 p.m. CDT
- Game weather: Sunny and breezy, 87 °F (31 °C)
- Game attendance: 983
- Box score, Recap

Game information
First quarter
- OPSU – Harrison Hackbarth 1-yard run (Aaron Ortega kick), 9:09. Aggies 7–0. Drive: 8 plays, 84 yards, 4:11.

Second quarter

- OPSU – Elijah Crook 87-yard pass from Harrison Hackbarth (Aaron Ortega kick), 13:31. Aggies 14–0. Drive: 1 play, 87 yards, 0:13.
- OPSU – David Zeller 28-yard pass from Harrison Hackbarth (Aaron Ortega kick), 7:45. Aggies 21–0. Drive: 8 plays, 70 yards, 3:49.
- SU – Christian Lora 1-yard run (Isaac Ponce run), 0:41. Aggies 21–8. Drive: 6 plays, 67 yards, 1:35.

Third quarter

- OPSU – David Zeller 19-yard pass from Harrison Hackbarth (kick failed), 8:50. Aggies 27–8. Drive: 2 plays, 32 yards, 0:23.
- OPSU – Tyrean Henderson 1-yard run (kick failed), 0:40. Aggies 33–8. Drive: 14 plays, 88 yards, 7:09.

Fourth quarter

- OPSU – David Zeller 32-yard pass from Harrison Hackbarth (Aaron Ortega kick), 10:25. Aggies 40–8. Drive: 9 plays, 70 yards, 4:20.
- SU – Theodis Fields 4-yard run (Major Luna pass to President Calamaco), 7:07. Aggies 40–16. Drive: 11 plays, 67 yards, 3:09.
- SU – Theodis Fields 2-yard run (pass failed), 3:10. Aggies 40–22. Drive: 6 plays, 70 yards, 1:38.
- OPSU – Joshua Cason 87-yard run (Aaron Ortega kick), 2:12. Aggies 47–22. Drive: 2 plays, 92 yards, 0:57.
- SU – Mar'kel Ford 54-yard pass from Major Luna (Bryce Warren kick), 1:35. Aggies 47–29. Drive: 3 plays, 64 yards, 0:26.

Statistics	SU	OPSU
First downs	24	23
Total yards	429	554
Rushing yards	134	210
Passing yards	295	344
Turnovers	1	1
Time of possession	28:37	31:23

Team	Category	Player	Statistics
Schreiner	Passing	Major Luna	9/18, 154 yards, TD, INT
Schreiner	Rushing	Aidan Varwig	8 rushes, 41 yards
Schreiner	Receiving	President Calamaco	6 receptions, 148 yards
Oklahoma Panhandle State	Passing	Harrison Hackbarth	17/24, 344 yards, 4 TD, INT
Oklahoma Panhandle State	Rushing	Joshua Cason	9 rushes, 103 yards, TD
Oklahoma Panhandle State	Receiving	Elijah Crook	4 receptions, 132 yards, TD

=== Southwestern (TX) ===
Southwestern Pirates at Schreiner Mountaineers – Game summary

Quarter	1	2	3	4	Total
Pirates	7	14	0	7	28
Mountaineers	7	7	7	10	31

at Antler Stadium, Kerrville, Texas

- Date: September 19
- Game time: 6:00 p.m. CDT
- Game weather: Sunny
- Game attendance: 2,300
- Referee: Xaiver Velasquez
- Box score, Recap

Game information
First quarter
- SW – Parker Threats 87-yard pass from Jaxon Sims (Alec Hargis kick), 5:52. Pirates 7–0. Drive: 1 play, 87 yards, 0:13.
- SU – Isaac Ponce 28-yard run (Bryce Warren kick), 3:57. Tied 7–7. Drive: 7 plays, 78 yards, 1:49.

Second quarter

- SU – Domynik Vasquez 41-yard pass from Isaac Ponce (Bryce Warren kick), 11:12. Mountaineers 14–7. Drive: 7 plays, 79 yards, 2:42.
- SW – Reece Cutrer 20-yard pass from Jaxon Sims (Alec Hargis kick), 3:05. Tied 14–14. Drive: 16 plays, 99 yards, 8:07.
- SW – Hudson Eidem 6-yard run (Alec Hargis kick), 0:58. Pirates 21–14. Drive: 3 plays, 80 yards, 0:51.

Third quarter

- SU – Devin Eure 10-yard interception return (Bryce Warren kick), 1:03. Tied 21–21.

Fourth quarter

- SU – Isaac Ponce 4-yard run (Bryce Warren kick), 3:26. Mountaineers 28–21. Drive: 14 plays, 83 yards, 4:55.
- SW – Graydon Thompson 54-yard pass from Jaxon Sims (Alec Hargis kick), 1:27. Tied 28–28. Drive: 6 plays, 99 yards, 1:59.
- SU – Bryce Warren 33-yard field goal, 0:00. Mountaineers 31–28. Drive: 9 plays, 59 yards, 1:18.

Statistics	SW	SU
First downs	20	28
Total yards	494	451
Rushing yards	207	225
Passing yards	287	226
Turnovers	2	0
Time of possession	31:49	28:11

Team	Category	Player	Statistics
Southwestern	Passing	Jaxon Sims	14/32, 287 yards, 3 TD, 2 INT
Southwestern	Rushing	Devin Baylor	15 rushes, 69 yards
Southwestern	Receiving	Parker Threats	3 receptions, 112 yards, TD
Schreiner	Passing	Isaac Ponce	19/28, 204 yards, TD
Schreiner	Rushing	Isaac Ponce	12 rushes, 66 yards, 2 TD
Schreiner	Receiving	President Calamaco	5 receptions, 69 yards

=== At Centenary ===
Schreiner Mountaineers at Centenary Gentlemen – Game summary

Quarter	1	2	3	4	Total
Mountaineers	0	7	7	0	14
Gentlemen	0	0	0	7	7

at Atkins Field, Shreveport, Louisiana

- Date: September 26
- Game time: 6:00 p.m. CDT
- Game weather: Sunny
- Game attendance: 345
- Referee: Bobby King III
- Box score, Recap

Game information
First quarter
- No scoring plays

Second quarter

- SU – Christian Lora 17-yard run (Bryce Warren kick), 3:21. Mountaineers 7–0. Drive: 7 plays, 80 yards, 5:07.

Third quarter

- SU – Derrick Gray 10-yard pass from Major Luna (Bryce Warren kick), 7:54. Mountaineers 14–0. Drive: 8 plays, 43 yards, 2:14.

Fourth quarter

- CEN – Theopholius Dunn 44-yard pass from Devon Strickland (Zane Wyss kick), 5:02. Mountaineers 14–7. Drive: 1 play, 59 yards, 0:08.

Statistics	SU	CEN
First downs	19	16
Total yards	390	290
Rushing yards	175	120
Passing yards	215	170
Turnovers	3	3
Time of possession	30:47	29:13

Team	Category	Player	Statistics
Schreiner	Passing	Isaac Ponce	9/16, 134 yards
Schreiner	Rushing	Theodis Fields	16 rushes, 97 yards
Schreiner	Receiving	Derrick Gray	7 receptions, 105 yards, TD
Centenary	Passing	Devon Strickland	3/8, 84 yards, TD
Centenary	Rushing	Theo Dunn	4 rushes, 42 yards
Centenary	Receiving	Theo Dunn	6 receptions, 69 yards, TD

=== Hendrix ===
Hendrix Warriors at Schreiner Mountaineers – Game summary

Quarter	1	2	3	4	Total
Warriors	7	14	21	7	49
Mountaineers	26	6	7	3	42

at Antler Stadium, Kerrville, Texas

- Date: October 3
- Game time: 6:00 p.m. CDT
- Game weather: Sunny
- Game attendance: 2,050
- Referee: John Grieger
- Box score, Recap

Game information
First quarter
- SU – President Calamaco 14-yard pass from Isaac Ponce (Bryce Warren kick), 12:51. Mountaineers 7–0. Drive: 5 plays, 45 yards, 0:58.
- SU – Theodis Fields 13-yard run (kick failed), 8:46. Mountaineers 13–0. Drive: 6 plays, 68 yards, 1:55.
- HEN – Westin Bruce 58-yard pass from Jake Blice (Clay Brandenburg kick), 6:37. Mountaineers 13–7. Drive: 5 plays, 75 yards, 2:09.
- SU – Derrick Gray 56-yard pass from Major Luna (Bryce Warren kick), 5:39. Mountaineers 20–7. Drive: 4 plays, 70 yards, 0:53.
- SU – Derrick Gray 40-yard pass from Isaac Ponce (pass failed), 2:36. Mountaineers 26–7. Drive: 3 plays, 61 yards, 1:00.

Second quarter

- SU – Bryce Warren 21-yard field goal, 10:08. Mountaineers 29–7. Drive: 10 plays, 94 yards, 3:07.
- HEN – Noah Jackson 3-yard run (Clay Brandenburg kick), 4:01. Mountaineers 29–14. Drive: 12 plays, 88 yards, 5:55.
- HEN – Westin Bruce 50-yard pass from Jake Blice (Clay Brandenburg kick), 0:54. Mountaineers 29–21. Drive: 5 plays, 76 yards, 0:59.
- SU – Bryce Warren 38-yard field goal, 0:00. Mountaineers 32–21. Drive: 7 plays, 44 yards, 0:54.

Third quarter

- HEN – Jayger Rainwater 8-yard pass from Jake Blice (Clay Brandenburg kick), 9:25. Mountaineers 32–28. Drive: 9 plays, 45 yards, 4:06.
- HEN – Westin Bruce 52-yard pass from Jake Blice (Clay Brandenburg kick), 6:42. Warriors 35–32. Drive: 3 plays, 65 yards, 1:28.
- HEN – Noah Jackson 3-yard run (Clay Brandenburg kick), 4:25. Warriors 42–32. Drive: 3 plays, 43 yards, 1:16.
- SU – Theodis Fields 7-yard pass from Major Luna (Bryce Warren kick), 1:01. Warriors 42–39. Drive: 10 plays, 68 yards, 3:24.

Fourth quarter

- HEN – Amare Foreman 5-yard pass from Jake Blice (Clay Brandenburg kick), 12:57. Warriors 49–39. Drive: 8 plays, 50 yards, 2:58.
- SU – Bryce Warren 22-yard field goal, 0:57. Warriors 49–42. Drive: 16 plays, 65 yards, 2:32.

Statistics	HEN	SU
First downs	30	28
Total yards	581	541
Rushing yards	133	157
Passing yards	448	384
Turnovers	1	1
Time of possession	36:47	23:13

Team	Category	Player	Statistics
Hendrix	Passing	Jake Blice	32/42, 448 yards, 5 TD, INT
Hendrix	Rushing	Noah Jackson	29 rushes, 110 yards, 2 TD
Hendrix	Receiving	Westin Bruce	5 receptions, 196 yards, 3 TD
Schreiner	Passing	Major Luna	16/31, 242 yards, 2 TD, INT
Schreiner	Rushing	Theodis Fields	18 rushes, 102 yards, TD
Schreiner	Receiving	President Calamaco	11 receptions, 165 yards, TD

=== At East Texas Baptist ===
Schreiner Mountaineers at East Texas Baptist Tigers – Game summary

Quarter	1	2	3	4	Total
Mountaineers	7	7	7	7	28
Tigers	27	14	7	14	62

at Ornelas Stadium, Marshall, Texas

- Date: October 10
- Game time: 1:00 p.m. CDT
- Game weather: Sunny, 83 °F (28 °C)
- Game attendance: 1,703
- Referee: Andy Dunklin
- Box score, Recap

Game information
First quarter
- ETB – Christopher Moore 6-yard pass from Jack Crawford (Pedro Cavazos kick), 11:28. Tigers 7–0. Drive: 8 plays, 59 yards, 3:21.
- SU – Theodis Fields 4-yard pass from Isaac Ponce (Bryce Warren kick), 8:39. Tied 7–7. Drive: 9 plays, 77 yards, 2:46.
- ETB – Dakarion Judge 24-yard pass from Jack Crawford (Pedro Cavazos kick), 6:40. Tigers 14–7. Drive: 4 plays, 75 yards, 1:59.
- ETB – Paul Woodard 57-yard run (Pedro Cavazos kick), 4:48. Tigers 21–7. Drive: 2 plays, 78 yards, 0:46.
- ETB – Eric Stovall 16-yard pass from Jack Crawford (kick failed), 0:16. Tigers 27–7. Drive: 5 plays, 70 yards, 2:09.

Second quarter

- SU – Derrick Gray 42-yard pass from Isaac Ponce (Bryce Warren kick), 10:03. Tigers 27–14. Drive: 4 plays, 62 yards, 1:30.
- ETB – Paul Woodard 19-yard pass from Jack Crawford (Pedro Cavazos kick), 9:07. Tigers 34–14. Drive: 2 plays, 31 yards, 0:43.
- ETB – Dakarion Judge 29-yard pass from Jack Crawford (Pedro Cavazos kick), 0:22. Tigers 41–14. Drive: 4 plays, 63 yards, 0:41.

Third quarter

- SU – Isaac Ponce 1-yard run (Bryce Warren kick), 8:08. Tigers 41–21. Drive: 15 plays, 84 yards, 6:46.
- ETB – Paul Woodard 19-yard run (Pedro Cavazos kick), 4:54. Tigers 48–21. Drive: 7 plays, 75 yards, 3:14.

Fourth quarter

- ETB – Carson French 41-yard pass from Jaylen Spriggs (Mitchell White kick), 14:03. Tigers 55–21. Drive: 3 plays, 39 yards, 0:52.
- ETB – Jaylen Spriggs 7-yard run (Mitchell White kick), 7:41. Tigers 62–21. Drive: 1 play, 7 yards, 0:08.
- SU – DeMarcus Davis 20-yard pass from Major Luna (Bryce Warren kick), 5:02. Tigers 62–28. Drive: 8 plays, 75 yards, 2:39.

Statistics	SU	ETB
First downs	28	29
Total yards	545	705
Rushing yards	126	308
Passing yards	419	397
Turnovers	2	1
Time of possession	29:28	30:32

Team	Category	Player	Statistics
Schreiner	Passing	Isaac Ponce	28/39, 299 yards, 2 TD, INT
Schreiner	Rushing	Isaac Ponce	11 rushes, 56 yards, TD
Schreiner	Receiving	President Calamaco	12 receptions, 140 yards
East Texas Baptist	Passing	Jack Crawford	20/24, 345 yards, 5 TD
East Texas Baptist	Rushing	Paul Woodard	15 rushes, 156 yards, 2 TD
East Texas Baptist	Receiving	Kyler Paul	5 receptions, 82 yards

=== Howard Payne ===
Howard Payne Yellow Jackets at Schreiner Mountaineers – Game summary

Quarter	1	2	3	4	Total
Yellow Jackets	13	0	21	7	41
Mountaineers	0	7	7	7	21

at Antler Stadium, Kerrville, Texas

- Date: October 17
- Game time: 2:00 p.m. CDT
- Game weather: Sunny
- Game attendance: 1,650
- Referee: Duane Martin
- Box score, Recap

Game information
First quarter
- HPU – Deuce Martin 74-yard pass from Bryce Still (Osvaldo Gomez kick), 10:21. Yellow Jackets 7–0. Drive: 1 play, 74 yards, 0:12.
- HPU – Bryce Still 10-yard run (kick failed), 2:42. Yellow Jackets 13–0. Drive: 4 plays, 54 yards, 1:41.

Second quarter

- SU – Jason Oritz 7-yard run (Bryce Warren kick), 13:52. Yellow Jackets 13–7. Drive: 13 plays, 66 yards, 3:41.

Third quarter

- HPU – Devin Guillory 26-yard punt return (Osvaldo Gomez kick), 13:50. Yellow Jackets 20–7.
- HPU – J. D. Mays 7-yard run (Osvaldo Gomez kick), 9:21. Yellow Jackets 27–7. Drive: 7 plays, 54 yards, 3:25.
- SU – Aidan Varwig 12-yard run (Bryce Warren kick), 7:10. Yellow Jackets 27–14. Drive: 4 plays, 65 yards, 2:11.
- HPU – Ellis Myers 15-yard pass from Bryce Still (Osvaldo Gomez kick), 4:16. Yellow Jackets 34–14. Drive: 5 plays, 88 yards, 2:42.

Fourth quarter

- SU – Isaac Ponce 1-yard run (Bryce Warren kick), 14:37. Yellow Jackets 34–21. Drive: 12 plays, 50 yards, 4:31.
- HPU – Blessing Ngene 8-yard run (Osvaldo Gomez kick), 1:47. Yellow Jackets 41–21. Drive: 10 plays, 58 yards, 5:26.

Statistics	HPU	SU
First downs	23	25
Total yards	510	425
Rushing yards	307	179
Passing yards	203	246
Turnovers	1	3
Time of possession	35:32	24:28

Team	Category	Player	Statistics
Howard Payne	Passing	Bryce Still	16/27, 203 yards, 2 TD, INT
Howard Payne	Rushing	Blessing Ngene	26 rushes, 188 yards, TD
Howard Payne	Receiving	Deuce Martin	4 receptions, 96 yards, TD
Schreiner	Passing	Isaac Ponce	16/25, 209 yards, 2 INT
Schreiner	Rushing	Jason Ortiz	21 rushes, 112 yards, TD
Schreiner	Receiving	President Calamaco	7 receptions, 103 yards

=== At No. 17 Mary Hardin–Baylor ===
Schreiner Mountaineers at No. 17 Mary Hardin–Baylor Crusaders – Game summary

Quarter	1	2	3	4	Total
Mountaineers	0	0	7	0	7
No. 17 Crusaders	42	17	0	7	66

at Crusader Stadium, Belton, Texas

- Date: October 31
- Game time: 1:00 p.m. CDT
- Game weather: Sunny
- Referee: Eric Stern
- Box score, Recap

Game information
First quarter
- MHB – Will McClintock 19-yard pass from Carson Horton (Dax Dunham kick), 12:40. Crusaders 7–0. Drive: 6 plays, 75 yards, 2:20.
- MHB – B. J. Stewart 17-yard pass from Carson Horton (Dax Dunham kick), 8:48. Crusaders 14–0. Drive: 4 plays, 61 yards, 1:18.
- MHB – Jet Hayes 17-yard run (Dax Dunham kick), 7:47. Crusaders 21–0. Drive: 1 play, 17 yards, 0:09.
- MHB – Ja'Quaylon Silas 32-yard run (Dax Dunham kick), 6:16. Crusaders 28–0. Drive: 1 play, 32 yards, 0:08.
- MHB – Joey Johnson 31-yard interception return (Dax Dunham kick), 5:43. Crusaders 35–0.
- MHB – B. J. Stewart 51-yard pass from Carson Horton (Dax Dunham kick), 3:36. Crusaders 42–0. Drive: 2 plays, 60 yards, 0:41.

Second quarter

- MHB – Seth Mouser 1-yard run (Dax Dunham kick), 9:30. Crusaders 49–0. Drive: 4 plays, 81 yards, 1:26.
- MHB – Dax Dunham 18-yard field goal, 5:21. Crusaders 52–0. Drive: 4 plays, 3 yards, 1:59.
- MHB – Isaiah Nesmith 12-yard pass from Seth Mouser (Dax Dunham kick), 1:53. Crusaders 59–0. Drive: 5 plays, 46 yards, 1:54.

Third quarter

- SU – Derrick Gray 35-yard pass from Isaac Ponce (Bryce Warren kick), 3:35. Crusaders 59–7. Drive: 12 plays, 88 yards, 4:54.

Fourth quarter

- MHB – Ty'Zavion Hafford 9-yard run (Dax Dunham kick), 7:06. Crusaders 66–7. Drive: 3 plays, 18 yards, 1:54.

Statistics	SU	MHB
First downs	13	20
Total yards	207	501
Rushing yards	8	270
Passing yards	199	231
Turnovers	5	0
Time of possession	28:49	31:11

Team	Category	Player	Statistics
Schreiner	Passing	Isaac Ponce	8/16, 106 yards, TD, 2 INT
Schreiner	Rushing	Jason Ortiz	7 rushes, 16 yards
Schreiner	Receiving	Derrick Gray	7 receptions, 115 yards, TD
Mary Hardin–Baylor	Passing	Carson Horton	9/11, 205 yards, 3 TD
Mary Hardin–Baylor	Rushing	Ja'Quaylon Silas	11 rushes, 126 yards, TD
Mary Hardin–Baylor	Receiving	B. J. Stewart	5 receptions, 118 yards, 2 TD

=== At No. 6 Hardin–Simmons ===
Schreiner Mountaineers at No. 6 Hardin–Simmons Cowboys – Game summary

Quarter	1	2	3	4	Total
Mountaineers	0	0	0	0	0
No. 6 Cowboys	15	24	14	14	67

at Shelton Stadium, Abilene, Texas

- Date: November 7
- Game time: 1:00 p.m. CST
- Game weather: Cloudy, 55 °F (13 °C)
- Game attendance: 3,131
- Referee: James Minor
- Box score, Recap

Statistics	SU	HSU
First downs	9	35
Total yards	168	623
Rushing yards	79	303
Passing yards	89	320
Turnovers	4	0
Time of possession	24:56	35:04

Team	Category	Player	Statistics
Schreiner	Passing	Major Luna	12/31, 93 yards, 4 INT
Schreiner	Rushing	Aidan Varwig	10 rushes, 35 yards
Schreiner	Receiving	Ethan Collida	4 receptions, 52 yards
Hardin–Simmons	Passing	Ty Thompson	8/15, 140 yards
Hardin–Simmons	Rushing	Cayden Jones	16 rushes, 77 yards, 2 TD
Hardin–Simmons	Receiving	Jairdyn Anderson	5 receptions, 80 yards

=== McMurry ===
McMurry War Hawks at Schreiner Mountaineers – Game summary

Quarter	1	2	3	4	Total
War Hawks	0	14	16	7	37
Mountaineers	6	7	6	7	26

at Antler Stadium, Kerrville, Texas

- Date: November 14
- Game time: 2:00 p.m. CST
- Game weather: Sunny
- Game attendance: 1,100
- Referee: Duane Martin
- Box score, Recap

Statistics	MCM	SU
First downs	25	25
Total yards	471	414
Rushing yards	199	197
Passing yards	272	217
Turnovers	0	1
Time of possession	29:31	30:29

Team	Category	Player	Statistics
McMurry	Passing	Carson Roper	20/33, 261 yards, 2 TD
McMurry	Rushing	Carson Roper	13 rushes, 103 yards, TD
McMurry	Receiving	Thomas Chandler	8 receptions, 54 yards
Schreiner	Passing	Major Luna	18/29, 198 yards, TD, INT
Schreiner	Rushing	Major Luna	17 rushes, 73 yards
Schreiner	Receiving	Derrick Gray	5 receptions, 102 yards, TD
