= Antler Stadium =

Stadium in Mesquite, Texas

- Interactive map of Antler Stadium
- Full name: Tivy Antler Stadium
- Location: 1310 Sidney Baker Street, Kerrville, Texas, 78028
- Coordinates: 30.0568°N 99.1319°W
- Owner: Kerrville ISD
- Operator: Kerrville ISD
- Capacity: 6,000
- Surface: Omnigrass synthetic turf

Construction
- Opened: 1945
- Renovated: 2014

Tenants
- Tivy High School (UIL) (1945–present); Schreiner Mountaineers (NCAA) (2026–present)

Antler Stadium is a stadium located in Kerrville, Texas. It is owned and operated by the Kerrville Independent School District and serves as the home stadium for the Tivy High School Antlers and the Schreiner Mountaineers college football team. Antler stadium is primarily used for football, but is also used for soccer and track and field.

Following the July 2025 floods throughout the Texas Hill Country, Antler Stadium was used as a volunteer hub for cleanup and recovery. During the Antlers' 2025 football season opener at Antler Stadium, the players wore special jerseys with "First Responder" on the nameplate to honor the first responders and volunteers who worked during the floods.
