= Keith Allen (American football) =

American football coach (born 1974)

Current position
- Title: Head coach
- Team: Schreiner
- Conference: ASC
- Record: 3–7

Biographical details
- Born: July 12, 1974 (age 52); Tulsa, Oklahoma, U.S.
- Education: University of Oklahoma

Coaching career (HC unless noted)
- 1994–1996: Oklahoma (SA)
- 1997: Oklahoma (GA)
- 1998: Northeast Louisiana (DB)
- 1999–2000: TCU (RC)
- 2000–2001: Quincy (IL) (DC/ST)
- 2002–2004: San Jose State (ST/DB)
- 2005–2006: Southwest Baptist (DC)
- 2007–2012: Southwest Baptist
- 2013–2021: The King's Academy (FL)
- 2022–2024: Klein HS (TX) (OC)
- 2025–present: Schreiner

Head coaching record
- Overall: 30–46 (college); 5–1 (club team); 60–29 (high school)

Accomplishments and honors

Awards
- 2016: South Florida coach of the year, Florida Dairy Farmers Independent Football coach of the year, Palm Beach Post Coach of the Year 2017: South Florida Conference Coach of the Year 2018: Palm Beach Post Coach of the Year, Sun Sentinel Coach of the Year, FloridaHSFootball.com Coach of the Year 2019: NFHS Florida State Coach of the Year

Keith D. Allen (born July 12, 1974) is an American college football coach. He is the head football coach for Schreiner University, a position he has held since 2025. He was the head football coach at Southwest Baptist University from 2007 to 2012 and The King's Academy from 2013 to 2021. His 27 wins are the second-most in the history of Southwest Baptist's football program.

== Coaching career ==
Allen began coaching as a student coach at the University of Oklahoma under defensive coordinator Bill Young and head coach John Blake. After completing his degree in civil engineering, Allen stayed on in 1997 as the graduate assistant, working on defense. From there, Allen served as cornerbacks coach at Northeast Louisiana University—now the University of Louisiana at Monroe. After the 1998 season, Allen then took a position on Dennis Franchione's staff at Texas Christian University. In 2000, Allen left for Quincy University to be the defensive coordinator and special teams coordinator. In 2002, Allen left Quincy to be the defensive backs coach and special teams coordinator at San Jose State University. In 2005, he moved to Southwest Baptist University as defensive coordinator. Allen was elevated to interim head coach in 2007 after the resignation of Jack Peavey. Allen was then named head football coach at the conclusion of the 2007 season. He was the head football coach for The King's Academy in South Florida from 2013 to 2021.

== Head coaching record ==
=== College ===
Year	Team	Overall	Conference	Standing	Bowl/playoffs
Southwest Baptist Bearcats (Mid-America Intercollegiate Athletics Association) (2007)
2007	Southwest Baptist	0–11	0–9	10th	
Southwest Baptist Bearcats (NCAA Division II Independent) (2008–2011)
2008	Southwest Baptist	5–6			
2009	Southwest Baptist	6–5			
2010	Southwest Baptist	7–4			
2011	Southwest Baptist	6–5			
Southwest Baptist Bearcats (Mid-America Intercollegiate Athletics Association) (2012)
2012	Southwest Baptist	3–8	3–8	12th	
Southwest Baptist:		27–39	3–17		
Schreiner Mountaineers (American Southwest Conference) (2026–present)
2026	Schreiner	3–7	0–5	6th	
Schreiner:		3–7	0–5		
Total:		30–46			

=== Club team ===
Year	Team	Overall	Conference	Standing	Bowl/playoffs
Schreiner Mountaineers (Club team) (2025)
2025	Schreiner	5–1			
Schreiner:		5–1			
Total:		5–1			

=== High school ===
Year	Team	Overall	Conference	Standing	Bowl/playoffs
King's Academy Lions () (2013–2021)
2013	King's Academy	6–3	0–3	4th	
2014	King's Academy	5–5	4–2	3rd	
2015	King's Academy	4–6	3–6	7th	
2016	King's Academy	11–0	4–0	1st	
2017	King's Academy	7–2	6–1	2nd	
2018	King's Academy	12–2	7–1	2nd	
2019	King's Academy	5–5	0–0	N/A	
2020	King's Academy	4–2	0–0	N/A	
2021	King's Academy	6–4	0–0	N/A	
King's Academy:		60–29	24–13		
Total:		60–29			
National championship Conference title Conference division title or championship game berth
