= 2026 Wartburg Knights football team =

American college football season

2026 Wartburg Knights football

A–R–C Champion
- Conference: American Rivers Conference

Ranking
- AFCA: No. 12
- D3Football.com: No. 12
- Record: 8–2 (7–0 ARC)
- Head coach: Chris Winter (6th season)
- Offensive coordinator: Matt Wheeler (16th season)
- Defensive coordinator: Matt Tschetter (6th season)
- Home stadium: Walston-Hoover Stadium

2026 American Rivers Conference football standings
	Conf.			Overall
Team	W		L	W		L
No. 12 Wartburg $^	7	–	0	8	–	2
Coe	6	–	1	7	–	3
Dubuque	5	–	2	6	–	4
Central (IA)	4	–	3	6	–	4
Simpson (IA)	3	–	4	4	–	6
Nebraska Wesleyan	2	–	5	2	–	8
Buena Vista	1	–	6	2	–	8
Loras	0	–	7	2	–	8
$ – Conference champion; ^ – NCAA Division III playoff participant; As of November 20, 2026; Rankings from D3football.com

The 2026 Wartburg Knights football team represents Wartburg College as a member of the American Rivers Conference (ARC) during the 2026 NCAA Division III football season. Led by sixth-year head coach Chris Winter, the Knights play home games at Walston-Hoover Stadium in Waverly, Iowa.

The Knights won their 21st conference championship and 4th straight in 2025. On October 11, 2025 in their homecoming game against the University of Dubuque, the Knights won their 30th conference game in a row, which passed the old mark of 29 set by Central College in 1987.

== Schedule ==
Wartburg's 2026 regular season schedule consists of five home, with five on the road.

Date	Time	Opponent	Rank	Site	Result	Attendance
September 5	7:00 p.m.	at Monmouth (IL)*	No. 9	April Zorn Stadium; Monmouth, IL	W 36–21	2,250
September 12	1:00 p.m.	No. 1 North Central*	No. 9	Walston-Hoover Stadium; Waverly, IA	L 20–26	
September 19	1:00 p.m.	No. 4 Wisconsin–River Falls*	No. 6	Walston-Hoover Stadium; Waverly, IA	L 14–31	2,847
October 3	1:00 p.m.	at Nebraska Wesleyan	No. 12	Abel Stadium; Lincoln, NE	W 69–26	429
October 10	1:30 p.m.	Buena Vista^{†}	No. 11	Walston-Hoover Stadium; Waverly, IA	W 72–14	3,800
October 17	1:00 p.m.	at Loras	No. 11	Rock Bowl; Dubuque, IA	W 68–7	705
October 24	1:00 p.m.	at Dubuque	No. 11	Chalmers Field; Dubuque, IA	W 33–14	3,400
October 31	1:00 p.m.	Simpson	No. 12	Walston-Hoover Stadium; Waverly, IA	W 63–14	2,304
November 7	1:00 p.m.	at Central (IA)	No. 12	Ron and Joyce Schipper Stadium; Pella, IA	W 28–7	2,500
November 14	1:00 p.m.	Coe	No. 12	Walston-Hoover Stadium; Waverly, IA	W 21–10	3,404
November 21	12:00 p.m.	Northwestern (MN)*	No. 12	Walston-Hoover Stadium; Waverly, IA (NCAA Division III First Round)		
*Non-conference game; ^{†}Homecoming; Rankings from D3football.com Poll released prior to the game; All times are in central time

== Rankings ==
Ranking movements Legend: ██ Increase in ranking ██ Decrease in ranking
	Week												
Poll	Pre	1	2	3	4	5	6	7	8	9	10	11	Final
D3football.com	9	9	6	11	12	11	11	11	12	12	12	12	
AFCA	9	10	10	18	18	16	15	13	13	12	12	12	

== Awards and honors ==
Individual awards
Player	Award
Jake Walker	ARC Defensive Player of the Year
Coach	Award
Chris Winter	ARC Coach of the year

All-Conference
Player	Position	Team	Year
Jake Walker	DL	1	SR
Conner McDonald	DL	1	SR
David Borchers	DL	1	SR
Adam Link	LB	1	SR
Jason O'Boye	DB	1	SR
Dawson Rud	RB	1	JR
Sam Heither	TE	1	SO
Cole Hotz	OL	1	SR
Braden Plotz	OL	1	JR
Sam Watts	DL	2	JR
Tyler Gayer	LB	2	SR
Josh Papesh	QB	2	JR
Cole Mahnke	OL	2	JR
Drew Streb	OL	2	JR
Dylan Swanstrom	WR	2	SR
Austin Souhrada	LS	2	JR
Dylan Swanstrom	RS	2	SR
Rayce Heitman	WR	HM	SO
HM = Honorable mention. Reference:
