= B. J. Hammer =

American football coach (born c. 1978)

Current position
- Title: Head coach
- Team: Bowdoin
- Conference: NESCAC
- Record: 13–41

Biographical details
- Born: c. 1978 (age 47–48); Carmel, Indiana, U.S.
- Education: Wabash College (2001)

Playing career
- 1997–2000: Wabash
- Position: Linebacker

Coaching career (HC unless noted)
- 2001: Wabash (OLB)
- 2002: Heidelberg (LB)
- 2003–2005: Whittier (DC)
- 2006–2010: Whittier
- 2011–2015: Wabash (DC)
- 2016–2018: Allegheny
- 2019–present: Bowdoin

Head coaching record
- Overall: 35–94

Accomplishments and honors

Awards
- 2× All-American (1999–2000); 3× All-NCAC (1998–2000)

William J. Hammer (born c. 1978) is an American college football coach. He is the head football coach for Bowdoin College, a position he has held since 2019. He was the head football coach for Whittier College from 2006 to 2010 and Allegheny College from 2016 to 2018. He also coached for Wabash and Heidelberg. He played college football for Wabash as a defensive lineman.

== Head coaching record ==
Year	Team	Overall	Conference	Standing	Bowl/playoffs
Whittier Poets (Southern California Intercollegiate Athletic Conference) (2006–2010)
2006	Whittier	2–7	1–5	7th	
2007	Whittier	4–5	3–3	4th	
2008	Whittier	1–8	0–6	7th	
2009	Whittier	3–6	1–5	6th	
2010	Whittier	2–7	1–5	T–5th	
Whittier:		12–33	6–24		
Allegheny Gators (North Coast Athletic Conference) (2016–2018)
2016	Allegheny	1–9	1–8	9th	
2017	Allegheny	3–7	2–7	8th	
2018	Allegheny	6–4	6–3	4th	
Allegheny:		10–20	9–18		
Bowdoin Polar Bears (New England Small College Athletic Conference) (2019–present)
2019	Bowdoin	0–9	0–9	10th	
2020–21	No team—COVID-19				
2021	Bowdoin	1–8	1–8	10th	
2022	Bowdoin	3–6	3–6	T–6th	
2023	Bowdoin	4–5	4–5	T–5th	
2024	Bowdoin	3–6	3–6	7th	
2025	Bowdoin	2–7	2–7	T–8th	
2026	Bowdoin	0–0	0–0		
Bowdoin:		13–41	13–41		
Total:		35–94			
