= Schreiner University =

Presbyterian university in Kerrville, Texas

Coordinates: 30.032°N 99.130°W

- Former names: Schreiner Institute (1923–1973); Schreiner College (1973–2001)
- Motto: You Will Achieve More
- Type: Private university
- Established: September 1923; 103 years ago
- Founder: Charles Schreiner Sr.
- Religious affiliation: Presbyterian Church (USA)
- Endowment: $57.9 million
- President: Dr. Charlie McCormick
- Provost: Dr. Lucien Costley
- Students: 1,326
- Undergraduates: 1,120
- Postgraduates: 206
- Location: 2100 Memorial Blvd, Kerrville, Texas, 78028, United States
- Campus: 212 acres; Rural
- Colors: Maroon & White
- Nickname: Mountaineers
- Sporting affiliations: NCAA Division III – SCAC
- Mascot: Monty the Mountain Lion
- Website: schreiner.edu
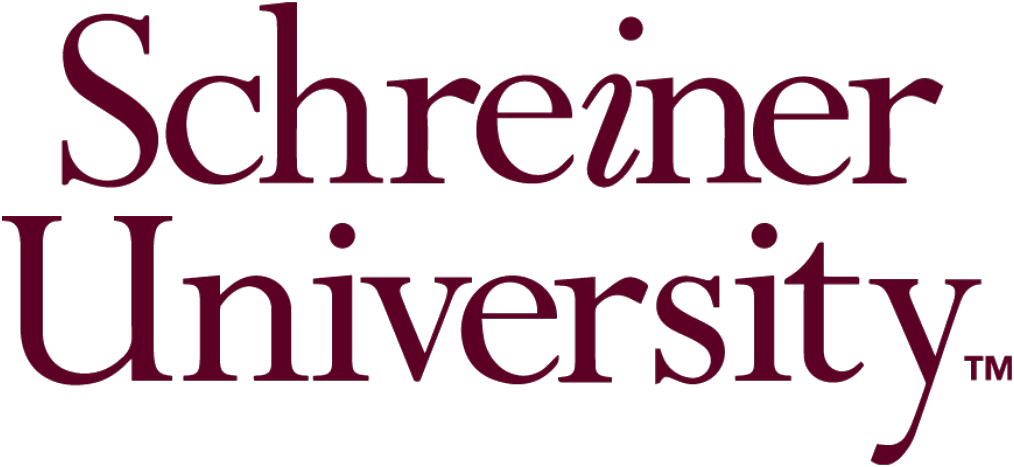

Schreiner University is a private Presbyterian university in Kerrville, Texas. The university enrolls an estimated 1,300 undergraduate and graduate students. It offers over 40 four-year undergraduate programs, an MBA and a master of education. Established in 1923, it has been coeducational since 1932. The university is also home to Schreiner Institute, a college-level service academy preparatory program for those who did not receive appointments or nominations straight out of high school, ROTC, and veteran services. Prior to the founding of the Schreiner Institute, Schreiner University was home to Greystone Preparatory School, a service academy preparatory program, which now operates at the University of the Ozarks.

== History ==
Captain Charles Schreiner Sr. founded "Schreiner Institute" (sometimes called Schreiner Military Institute) in 1917 and worked toward its establishment until 1923. The military institute, a residential school, was created for young boys and included both secondary school and junior college curricula to prepare students for further education. 1971 marked the end of military training at the institute. In 1973, it began focusing on a college curriculum and changed its name to "Schreiner College". The college experience changed once more in 1981 when it became a four-year college. The college became "Schreiner University" in 2001 and began offering master's degrees. Schreiner University now hosts a number of lecture series and academic conferences, including its annual popular culture symposium.

In 2017, Schreiner surpassed its five-year capital campaign fundraising goal of $50 million. Since 2012, the institution has received $52.4 million from approximately 3,600 donors. Nearly $30 million of the amount raised is earmarked for student scholarships, which have been previously funded at $13 million. The school will add endowed chairs in mathematics, science, and humanities and hire a visiting artist and performer or designer in residence. Schreiner has a current enrollment of 1,326.

== Campus ==
The university no longer operates the Hill Country Museum in the house of its founder, the Capt. Charles Schreiner Mansion.

== Academics ==
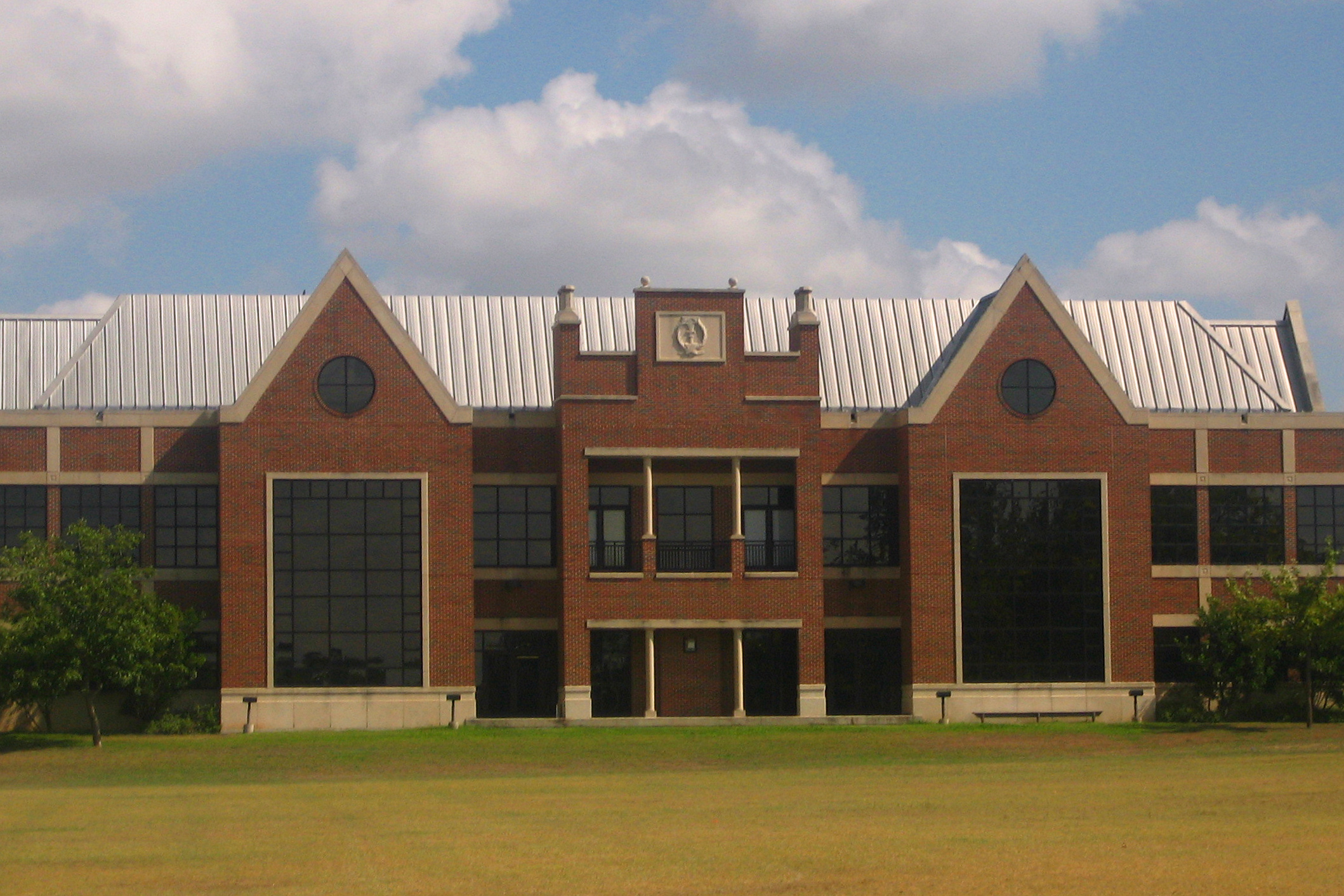
The Callioux Campus Activity Center (CCAC) on Schreiner University's campus

Schreiner University is accredited by the Commission on Colleges of the Southern Association of Colleges and Schools to award masters, baccalaureate and associate degrees. The university also holds accreditation by the Texas Board of Vocational Nurse Examiners and is approved by the Texas Board of Nursing as well as the State Board for Educator Certification (SBEC) for teacher certification programs.

The university holds membership in the American Association for Higher Education, the American Council on Education, the Association of Presbyterian Colleges and Universities, the National Association of Independent Colleges and Universities, the Association of Texas Colleges and Universities, and the Independent Colleges and Universities of Texas.

== Student life ==
=== Athletics ===
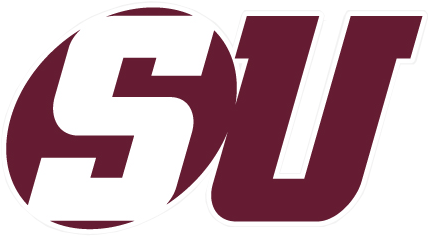
Schreiner athletics monogram

Schreiner University sports teams participate as a member of the National Collegiate Athletic Association (NCAA)'s Division III. The Mountaineers are a member of the Southern Collegiate Athletic Conference (SCAC), but will move to the American Southwest Conference (ASC) effective July 1, 2026.

Men's sports include baseball, basketball, track and field, cross country, golf, soccer and tennis; while women's sports include basketball, track and field, cross country, golf, soccer, softball, tennis and volleyball. Wrestling was added for the start of the 2018-19 year, only the second program in the state after Wayland Baptist University and the first in the NCAA.

In 2024, the university announced that the football program would be returning, last fielding a team in the 1950s; the team will play an exhibition schedule in 2025 before playing a full schedule in the 2026 season, playing home games at Kerrville ISD's Antler Stadium. Kenneth Treschitta was announced as the Mountaineers' head coach on July 3, 2024, having previously served as the defensive coordinator for the New England Nor'easters. Treschitta would step down in February 2025 for unknown reasons and was replaced by Keith Allen. On March 7, 2025, Klein High School head coach Shane Hallmark, whom Allen had worked under as an offensive coordinator, was hired as the Mountaineers' defensive coordinator. Former Tivy High School head coach David Jones was hired as the Mountaineers' offensive coordinator a few weeks later on March 25.

The National Football League's Houston Oilers conducted training camp at Schreiner from 1967 to 1973.

=== Greek life ===
Greek life began at Schreiner University with the chartering of the sorority Delta Phi Epsilon, establishing its Gamma Gamma chapter on January 25, 2003. On May 3 of the same year, the Phi Delta Theta fraternity established its Texas Sigma chapter, being the first fraternity to be officially chartered with 26 founding fathers including Mickey Holt, 2nd baseman of the baseball team. Greek life had been unofficially established on campus earlier, on February 21, 2001, when Chi Phi fraternity founded a colony at Schreiner University; however, the colony was not chartered into the Iota Theta chapter of the Chi Phi fraternity until 2005. On March 25, 2006, the Theta Epsilon chapter of Alpha Sigma Alpha was installed, becoming the second sorority on campus.

== Notable people ==
- Winnie Baze, American football player
- Raymond Berry, American football player and coach
- David Hulse, former Major League Baseball player (Texas Rangers and Milwaukee Brewers)
- Tex Irvin, American football player
- Charley Johnson, American football quarterback and retired professor of chemical engineering attended Schreiner
- James E. Nugent (Class of 1941), former member of the Texas House of Representatives and the Texas Railroad Commission
- Charles Schreiner III, rancher and businessman in Kerr County, who helped to preserve the Texas Longhorn cattle; grandson of Charles Schreiner Sr.
- Gene S. Walker Sr., rancher and businessman in Webb County

== See also ==
- Capt. Charles Schreiner Mansion
