= 2026 NCAA Division III football season =

American college football season

- Total No. of teams: 244
- Regular season: September 3 – November 14, 2026
- Playoffs: November 21 – January 3, 2027
- National championship: Salem Football Stadium; Salem, VA; January 3, 2027

The 2026 NCAA Division III football season is the component of the 2026 college football season organized by the NCAA at the Division III level in the United States. The regular season began on September 3 and will end on November 14. This is the 53rd season in which the NCAA has sponsored a Division III championship.

Wisconsin–River Falls is the defending national champion.

The season's playoffs will be played between November 21 and January 3, 2027, culminating in the national championship—also known as the Stagg Bowl—at Salem Football Stadium in Salem, Virginia.

== Conference changes and new programs ==
=== Membership changes ===
Team	Former conference	New conference	Source
Anna Maria Amcats	MASCAC	School closed	
Azusa Pacific Cougars	Restarted program (Note: Azusa Pacific is also transitioning from Division II.)	SCIAC	
Gallaudet Bison	ODAC	SCAC	
Luther Norse	American Rivers	Midwest	
McMurry War Hawks	SCAC	American Southwest	
Saint Francis Red Wolves	NEC (D-I FCS)	Presidents'	
Schreiner Mountaineers	New program	American Southwest	
Washington University Bears	CCIW	North Coast	
Whittier Poets	Restarted program	SCIAC	

== Other headlines ==
- The NESCAC announced that it would begin allowing its teams to participate in the NCAA Division III Championship, beginning in the 2026 season.

== Conference standings ==
2026 American Rivers Conference football standings
	Conf.			Overall
Team	W		L	W		L
No. 12 Wartburg $^	7	–	0	8	–	2
Coe	6	–	1	7	–	3
Dubuque	5	–	2	6	–	4
Central (IA)	4	–	3	6	–	4
Simpson (IA)	3	–	4	4	–	6
Nebraska Wesleyan	2	–	5	2	–	8
Buena Vista	1	–	6	2	–	8
Loras	0	–	7	2	–	8
$ – Conference champion; ^ – NCAA Division III playoff participant; As of November 22, 2026; Rankings from D3football.com

2026 American Southwest Conference football standings
	Conf.			Overall
Team	W		L	W		L
No. 10 Mary Hardin–Baylor $^	5	–	0	9	–	1
No. 11 Hardin–Simmons ^	4	–	1	8	–	1
McMurry	3	–	2	6	–	4
Howard Payne	2	–	3	6	–	3
East Texas Baptist	1	–	4	3	–	7
Schreiner	0	–	5	3	–	7
$ – Conference champion; ^ – NCAA Division III playoff participant; As of November 22, 2026; Rankings from D3football.com

2026 Centennial Conference football standings
	Conf.			Overall
Team	W		L	W		L
Dickinson $^	6	–	1	8	–	2
Franklin & Marshall	5	–	2	8	–	2
Ursinus	5	–	2	8	–	2
Carnegie Mellon	4	–	3	5	–	5
Johns Hopkins	4	–	3	5	–	5
Muhlenberg	3	–	4	5	–	5
Gettysburg	1	–	6	3	–	7
McDaniel	0	–	7	1	–	9
$ – Conference champion; ^ – NCAA Division III playoff participant; As of November 22, 2026; Rankings from D3football.com

2026 College Conference of Illinois and Wisconsin football standings
	Conf.			Overall
Team	W		L	W		L
No. 1 Wheaton (IL) $^	8	–	0	10	–	0
No. 5 North Central (IL) ^	7	–	1	9	–	1
Illinois Wesleyan	5	–	3	7	–	3
Augustana (IL)	5	–	3	6	–	4
Carroll (WI)	3	–	5	4	–	6
Millikin	3	–	5	4	–	6
North Park	3	–	5	3	–	7
Carthage	2	–	6	3	–	7
Elmhurst	0	–	8	1	–	9
$ – Conference champion; ^ – NCAA Division III playoff participant; As of November 22, 2026; Rankings from D3Football.com

2026 Conference of New England football standings
	Conf.			Overall
Team	W		L	W		L
No. 6 Endicott $^	7	–	0	10	–	0
Western New England	5	–	2	6	–	4
New England (ME)	5	–	2	5	–	5
Husson	5	–	2	5	–	5
Curry	3	–	4	4	–	6
Nichols	2	–	5	2	–	8
New England (NH)	1	–	6	2	–	8
Maine Maritime	0	–	7	0	–	10
$ – Conference champion; ^ – NCAA Division III playoff participant; As of November 22, 2026; Rankings from D3Football.com

2026 Empire 8 Athletic Conference football standings
	Conf.			Overall
Team	W		L	W		L
No. 7 Cortland $^	7	–	0	10	–	0
No. 20 Utica ^	6	–	1	9	–	1
Brockport	5	–	2	4	–	3
St. John Fisher	4	–	3	7	–	3
Alfred State	3	–	4	6	–	4
Alfred	2	–	5	3	–	7
Hartwick	1	–	6	3	–	7
Morrisville	0	–	7	1	–	9
$ – Conference champion; ^ – NCAA Division III playoff participant; As of November 22, 2026; Rankings from D3Football.com

2026 Heartland Collegiate Athletic Conference football standings
	Conf.			Overall
Team	W		L	W		L
Hanover +^	5	–	1	8	–	2
Mount St. Joseph +	5	–	1	8	–	2
Rose–Hulman +	5	–	1	7	–	3
Franklin (IN)	3	–	3	5	–	5
Bluffton	2	–	4	2	–	8
Anderson (IN)	1	–	5	2	–	8
Manchester	0	–	6	1	–	9
+ – Conference co-champions; ^ – NCAA Division III playoff participant; As of November 22, 2026; Rankings from D3Football.com

2026 Landmark Conference football standings
	Conf.			Overall
Team	W		L	W		L
No. 18 Susquehanna $^	6	–	0	9	–	1
Lycoming	5	–	1	6	–	4
Wilkes	4	–	2	5	–	4
Western Connecticut	2	–	4	3	–	6
Catholic University	2	–	4	2	–	8
Juniata	1	–	5	2	–	8
Moravian	1	–	5	2	–	8
$ – Conference champion; ^ – NCAA Division III playoff participant; As of November 22, 2026; Rankings from D3Football.com

2026 Liberty League football standings
	Conf.			Overall
Team	W		L	W		L
RPI $^	7	–	0	8	–	2
Ithaca	6	–	1	7	–	3
Hobart	5	–	2	7	–	3
Union (NY)	4	–	3	5	–	5
Rochester	3	–	4	4	–	6
St. Lawrence	2	–	5	3	–	7
Buffalo State	1	–	6	1	–	9
Hilbert	0	–	7	0	–	10
$ – Conference champion; ^ – NCAA Division III playoff participant; As of November 22, 2026; Rankings from D3Football.com

2026 Massachusetts State Collegiate Athletic Conference football standings
	Conf.			Overall
Team	W		L	W		L
Bridgewater State $^	7	–	1	8	–	1
Framingham State	6	–	2	7	–	2
Massachusetts Maritime	5	–	3	6	–	3
UMass Dartmouth	5	–	3	5	–	4
Worcester State	5	–	3	5	–	5
Westfield State	4	–	4	4	–	5
Plymouth State	3	–	5	4	–	5
Fitchburg State	1	–	7	1	–	8
Dean	0	–	8	1	–	8
$ – Conference champion; ^ – NCAA Division III playoff participant; As of November 22, 2026; Rankings from D3Football.com

2026 Michigan Intercollegiate Athletic Association football standings
	Conf.			Overall
Team	W		L	W		L
No. 13 Calvin $^	7	–	0	10	–	0
No. 19 Hope ^	6	–	1	9	–	1
Trine	5	–	2	7	–	3
Adrian	3	–	4	5	–	5
Alma	3	–	4	3	–	7
Kalamazoo	2	–	5	3	–	7
Albion	2	–	5	2	–	8
Olivet	0	–	7	3	–	7
$ – Conference champion; ^ – NCAA Division III playoff participant; As of November 22, 2026; Rankings from D3Football.com

2026 Middle Atlantic Conference football standings
	Conf.			Overall
Team	W		L	W		L
Eastern +^	8	–	1	8	–	2
Delaware Valley +	8	–	1	8	–	2
Misericordia	6	–	3	7	–	3
Stevenson	6	–	3	7	–	3
Alvernia	5	–	4	5	–	5
Lebanon Valley	4	–	5	4	–	6
Albright	3	–	6	4	–	6
King's (PA)	3	–	6	3	–	6
Widener	2	–	7	2	–	8
FDU–Florham	0	–	9	0	–	10
+ – Conference co-champions; ^ – NCAA Division III playoff participant; As of November 22, 2026; Rankings from D3Football.com

2026 Midwest Conference football standings
	Conf.			Overall
Team	W		L	W		L
Monmouth (IL) $^	8	–	0	8	–	2
Chicago	7	–	1	8	–	2
Lake Forest	7	–	1	9	–	1
Luther	6	–	2	7	–	3
Grinnell	4	–	4	5	–	5
Illinois College	4	–	4	5	–	5
Cornell (IA)	3	–	5	4	–	6
Ripon	3	–	5	3	–	7
Beloit	1	–	7	2	–	8
Lawrence	1	–	7	1	–	9
Knox	0	–	8	1	–	9
$ – Conference champion; ^ – NCAA Division III playoff participant; As of November 22, 2026; Rankings from D3Football.com

2026 Minnesota Intercollegiate Athletic Conference football standings
	Conf.			Overall
Team	W		L	W		L
No. 3 Saint John's (MN) $^	9	–	0	10	–	0
No. 14 Bethel (MN)	8	–	1	8	–	2
Concordia–Moorhead	7	–	2	8	–	2
Gustavus Adolphus	6	–	3	7	–	3
Carleton	5	–	4	5	–	5
St. Olaf	4	–	5	4	–	6
Augsburg	3	–	6	3	–	7
Macalester	2	–	7	3	–	7
St. Scholastica	1	–	8	1	–	9
Hamline	0	–	9	1	–	9
$ – Conference champion; ^ – NCAA Division III playoff participant; As of November 22, 2026; Rankings from D3Football.com

2026 New England Small College Athletic Conference football standings
	Conf.			Overall
Team	W		L	W		L
Amherst +^	8	–	1	8	–	1
Trinity (CT) +^	8	–	1	8	–	1
Wesleyan +^	8	–	1	8	–	1
Tufts	6	–	3	6	–	3
Williams	5	–	4	5	–	4
Middlebury	4	–	5	4	–	5
Hamilton	3	–	6	3	–	6
Colby	2	–	7	2	–	7
Bates	1	–	8	1	–	8
Bowdoin	0	–	9	0	–	9
+ – Conference co-champions; ^ – NCAA Division III playoff participant; As of November 22, 2026; Rankings from D3Football.com

2026 New England Women's and Men's Athletic Conference football standings
	Conf.			Overall
Team	W		L	W		L
No. 24 Springfield $^	7	–	0	9	–	1
Merchant Marine ^	6	–	1	8	–	1
MIT	5	–	2	7	–	2
Salve Regina	4	–	3	7	–	3
WPI	3	–	4	5	–	5
Coast Guard	2	–	5	4	–	6
Norwich	1	–	6	3	–	7
Maritime	0	–	7	2	–	8
$ – Conference champion; ^ – NCAA Division III playoff participant; As of November 22, 2026; Rankings from D3Football.com

2026 New Jersey Athletic Conference football standings
	Conf.			Overall
Team	W		L	W		L
No. 17 Christopher Newport +^	6	–	1	9	–	1
Montclair State +	6	–	1	8	–	2
Rowan	5	–	2	7	–	3
Salisbury	5	–	2	8	–	2
TCNJ	3	–	4	4	–	6
Kean	2	–	5	3	–	6
William Paterson	1	–	6	1	–	9
Castleton	0	–	7	2	–	8
+ – Conference co-champions; ^ – NCAA Division III playoff participant; As of November 22, 2026; Rankings from D3Football.com

2026 North Coast Athletic Conference football standings
	Conf.			Overall
Team	W		L	W		L
No. 8 Washington University $^	9	–	0	10	–	0
No. 15 DePauw ^	8	–	1	9	–	1
No. 23 John Carroll	7	–	2	8	–	2
Denison	6	–	3	6	–	4
Ohio Wesleyan	5	–	4	6	–	4
Wabash	4	–	5	5	–	5
Wooster	3	–	6	3	–	7
Kenyon	2	–	7	3	–	7
Wittenberg	1	–	8	1	–	9
Oberlin	0	–	9	0	–	10
$ – Conference champion; ^ – NCAA Division III playoff participant; As of November 22, 2026; Rankings from D3Football.com

2026 Northern Athletics Collegiate Conference football standings
	Conf.			Overall
Team	W		L	W		L
Concordia (WI) $^	8	–	0	10	–	0
Benedictine (IL) ^	7	–	1	9	–	1
St. Norbert	6	–	2	6	–	4
Aurora	5	–	3	5	–	5
Concordia (IL)	4	–	4	6	–	4
Lakeland	3	–	5	4	–	6
Wisconsin Lutheran	2	–	6	4	–	6
Rockford	1	–	7	1	–	9
Eureka	0	–	8	0	–	10
$ – Conference champion; ^ – NCAA Division III playoff participant; As of November 22, 2026; Rankings from D3Football.com

2026 Northwest Conference football standings
	Conf.			Overall
Team	W		L	W		L
No. 21 Linfield $^	7	–	0	9	–	1
Lewis & Clark	6	–	1	8	–	2
Whitworth	5	–	2	6	–	3
George Fox	4	–	3	7	–	3
Pacific Lutheran	2	–	5	3	–	7
Puget Sound	2	–	5	2	–	7
Pacific (OR)	2	–	5	2	–	8
Willamette	0	–	7	1	–	9
$ – Conference champion; ^ – NCAA Division III playoff participant; As of November 22, 2026; Rankings from D3Football.com

2026 Ohio Athletic Conference football standings
	Conf.			Overall
Team	W		L	W		L
No. 9 Baldwin Wallace $^	8	–	0	10	–	0
Heidelberg ^	6	–	2	8	–	2
Mount Union	6	–	2	7	–	3
Marietta	5	–	3	7	–	3
Ohio Northern	5	–	3	6	–	4
Capital	3	–	5	5	–	5
Otterbein	2	–	6	3	–	7
Wilmington (OH)	1	–	7	2	–	8
Muskingum	0	–	8	0	–	10
$ – Conference champion; ^ – NCAA Division III playoff participant; As of November 22, 2026; Rankings from D3Football.com

2026 Old Dominion Athletic Conference football standings
	Conf.			Overall
Team	W		L	W		L
No. 25 Hampden–Sydney $^	7	–	0	9	–	1
Washington and Lee	5	–	2	7	–	3
Randolph–Macon	5	–	2	7	–	3
Shenandoah	4	–	3	6	–	4
Bridgewater	4	–	3	4	–	6
Roanoke	2	–	5	5	–	5
Averett	1	–	6	3	–	7
Guilford	0	–	7	1	–	9
$ – Conference champion; ^ – NCAA Division III playoff participant; As of November 22, 2026; Rankings from D3Football.com

2026 Presidents' Athletic Conference football standings
	Conf.			Overall
Team	W		L	W		L
No. 22 Washington & Jefferson $^	7	–	0	9	–	1
Grove City	6	–	1	7	–	3
Allegheny	6	–	2	8	–	2
Case Western Reserve	5	–	2	8	–	2
Westminster (PA)	4	–	3	5	–	5
Waynesburg	4	–	4	4	–	6
Saint Vincent	3	–	4	5	–	4
Bethany (WV)	2	–	5	4	–	6
Geneva	2	–	5	4	–	6
Hiram	1	–	6	4	–	6
Saint Francis (PA) *	0	–	0	0	–	8
Thiel	0	–	8	0	–	10
$ – Conference champion; ^ – NCAA Division III playoff participant; * – Saint Francis (PA) ineligible for postseason play due to transition from NCAA Division I FCS; As of November 22, 2026; Rankings from D3Football.com

2026 Southern Athletic Association football standings
	Conf.			Overall
Team	W		L	W		L
No. 16 Trinity (TX) $^	6	–	1	9	–	1
Millsaps	5	–	2	7	–	3
Maryville (TN)	5	–	2	5	–	5
Berry	4	–	3	7	–	3
Centre	4	–	3	5	–	5
Southwestern (TX)	3	–	4	3	–	7
Rhodes	1	–	6	2	–	8
Sewanee	0	–	7	1	–	9
$ – Conference champion; ^ – NCAA Division III playoff participant; As of November 22, 2026; Rankings from D3Football.com

2026 Southern California Intercollegiate Athletic Conference football standings
	Conf.			Overall
Team	W		L	W		L
Claremont-Mudd-Scripps y$^	7	–	1	8	–	2
Chapman y	7	–	1	8	–	2
Cal Lutheran	5	–	3	6	–	4
Pomona–Pitzer	5	–	3	6	–	4
Redlands	4	–	4	4	–	6
Azusa Pacific *	2	–	6	2	–	7
La Verne	2	–	6	4	–	6
Whittier	0	–	8	1	–	9
Championship: Clarmont-Mudd-Scripps 19, Chapman 14
$ – Conference champion; y – Championship game participant; ^ – NCAA Division III playoff participant; * – Azusa Pacific ineligible for postseason play due to transition from NCAA Division II; As of November 22, 2026; Rankings from D3Football.com

2026 Southern Collegiate Athletic Conference football standings
	Conf.			Overall
Team	W		L	W		L
Texas Lutheran y$^	5	–	0	9	–	1
Hendrix y	3	–	2	6	–	4
Centenary	2	–	3	3	–	6
Lyon	2	–	3	3	–	7
Austin	1	–	4	2	–	8
Gallaudet	0	–	1	0	–	7
Championship: Texas Lutheran 47, Hendrix 7
$ – Conference champion; y – Championship game participant; ^ – NCAA Division III playoff participant; As of November 22, 2026; Rankings from D3Football.com

2026 Upper Midwest Athletic Conference football standings
	Conf.			Overall
Team	W		L	W		L
Northwestern (MN) $^	6	–	1	6	–	4
Westminster (MO)	5	–	2	7	–	3
Martin Luther	5	–	2	5	–	5
Greenville	2	–	5	3	–	7
Minnesota Morris	2	–	5	3	–	7
Crown	1	–	6	2	–	8
$ – Conference champion; ^ – NCAA Division III playoff participant; As of November 22, 2026; Rankings from D3Football.com

2026 USA South Athletic Conference football standings
	Conf.			Overall
Team	W		L	W		L
Huntingdon $^	7	–	0	8	–	2
LaGrange	6	–	1	8	–	2
Brevard	5	–	2	8	–	2
Belhaven	3	–	4	4	–	6
Greensboro	3	–	4	4	–	6
North Carolina Wesleyan	2	–	5	4	–	6
Southern Virginia	2	–	5	3	–	7
Methodist	0	–	7	1	–	9
$ – Conference champion; ^ – NCAA Division III playoff participant; As of November 22, 2026; Rankings from D3Football.com

2026 Wisconsin Intercollegiate Athletic Conference football standings
	Conf.			Overall
Team	W		L	W		L
No. 2 Wisconsin–Whitewater $^	7	–	0	10	–	0
No. 4 Wisconsin–Platteville ^	6	–	1	9	–	1
No. 25 Wisconsin–River Falls	4	–	3	7	–	3
Wisconsin–Stout	4	–	3	6	–	4
Wisconsin–Eau Claire	3	–	4	6	–	4
Wisconsin–La Crosse	3	–	4	4	–	6
Wisconsin–Oshkosh	1	–	6	3	–	7
Wisconsin–Stevens Point	0	–	7	2	–	8
$ – Conference champion; ^ – NCAA Division III playoff participant; As of November 22, 2026; Rankings from D3Football.com

2026 NCAA Division III independents football records
	Conf.			Overall
Team	W		L	W		L
Keystone		–		2	–	7

== Postseason ==
=== Teams ===
==== Automatic bids (29) ====
Automatic bids
Conference	School	Record	Appearance	Last
American Rivers	Wartburg	8–2	19th	2025
American Southwest	Mary Hardin–Baylor	9–1	20th	2024
Centennial	Dickinson	8–2	5th	2006
CCIW	Wheaton (IL)	10–0	16th	2025
Empire 8	Cortland	9–1	15th	2025
HCAC	Hanover	8–2	10th	2025
Landmark	Susquehanna	9–1	8th	2025
Liberty	RPI	8–2	8th	2021
MASCAC	Bridgewater State	8–1	5th	2016
Michigan	Calvin	10–0	1st	—
Middle Atlantic	Eastern	8–2	2nd	2025
Midwest	Monmouth (IL)	8–2	9th	2025
Minnesota	Saint John's (MN)	10–0	31st	2025
NESCAC	Trinity (CT)	8–1	1st	—
NEWMAC	Springfield	9–1	12th	2025
New England	Endicott	10–0	8th	2025
New Jersey	Christopher Newport	9–1	13th	2025
North Coast	Washington University	10–0	4th	2016
NACC	Concordia (WI)	10–0	6th	2025
Northwest	Linfield	9–1	19th	2024
Ohio	Baldwin Wallace	10–0	7th	2003
Old Dominion	Hampden–Sydney	9–1	8th	2014
Presidents'	Washington & Jefferson	9–1	29th	2025
SAA	Trinity (TX)	9–1	18th	2025
SCAC	Texas Lutheran	9–1	2nd	2024
SCIAC	Claremont-Mudd-Scripps	8–2	2nd	2018
Upper Midwest	Northwestern (MN)	6–4	4th	2024
USA South	Huntingdon	8–2	8th	2022
Wisconsin	Wisconsin–Whitewater	10–0	22nd	2025

==== At-large bids (11) ====
At-large bids
School	Conference	Record	Appearance	Last
Benedictine (IL)	NACC	9–1	4th	2014
Heidelberg	Ohio	8–2	2nd	2012
Amherst	NESCAC	8–1	1st	—
Hardin–Simmons	American Southwest	8–1	15th	2025
North Central (IL)	CCIW	9–1	18th	2025
DePauw	North Coast	9–1	8th	2025
Merchant Marine	NEWMAC	8–1	2nd	1994
Wesleyan	NESCAC	9–1	1st	—
Utica	Empire 8	9–1	2nd	2022
Wisconsin–Platteville	Wisconsin	9–1	5th	2025
Hope	Michigan	9–1	8th	2025

=== Bracket ===
First round November 21; Campus sites
*	Claremont-Mudd-Scripps	20
Huntingdon	19
*	Benedictine (IL)	24
Hanover	30
*	Heidelberg	21
Monmouth (IL)	24
*	Wartburg	42
Northwestern (MN)	7
*	Amherst	42
Bridgewater State	7
*	Trinity (CT)	21
RPI	17
*	Susquehanna	42
Eastern	7
*	Hardin–Simmons	34
Texas Lutheran	31

Second round November 28; Campus sites
*	Wisconsin–Whitewater
Claremont-Mudd-Scripps
*	Mary Hardin–Baylor
Trinity (TX)
*	Saint John's (MN)
Hanover
*	North Central (IL)
DePauw
*	Wheaton (IL)
Monmouth (IL)
*	Washington & Jefferson
Christopher Newport
*	Washington University
Wartburg
*	Concordia (WI)
Linfield
*	Cortland
Amherst
Merchant Marine
*	Hampden–Sydney
*	Endicott
Trinity (CT)
*	Springfield
Wesleyan
*	Baldwin Wallace
Susquehanna
*	Utica
Dickinson
*	Calvin
Hardin–Simmons
*	Wisconsin–Platteville
Hope

Third round December 5 Campus sites

Quarterfinals; December 12; Campus sites

Semifinals; December 19; Campus sites

Championship; 2027 Stagg Bowl; January 9, 2026; Salem Football Stadium; Salem, Virginia

* - Host team

=== Bowl games ===
Division III will hold 15 bowl games in 2026, featuring teams that did not qualify for the Division III postseason tournament.

Date	Time (EST)	Game	Site	Streaming	Teams	Affiliations	Results
Nov 20	6:30 PM	Bushnell Bowl	Campus sites		Brockport; Montclair State*	Empire 8 NJAC	Brockport 52; Montclair State 19
Nov 21	12:00 PM	Centennial-MAC; Bowl Series	Campus sites	Centennial Digital Network; MACtv	Misericordia; Franklin & Marshall*	Centennial; MAC	Misericordia 7 Franklin & Marshall 31
Nov 21	12:00 PM	Centennial-MAC; Bowl Series	Campus sites	Centennial Digital Network; MACtv	Ursinus; Delaware Valley*	Centennial; MAC	Ursinus 19; Delaware Valley 17
Nov 21	1:00 PM	Centennial-MAC; Bowl Series	Campus sites	Centennial Digital Network; MACtv	Carnegie Mellon; Stevenson*	Centennial; MAC	Carnegie Mellon 35; Stevenson 16
Nov 21	12:00 PM	Whitelaw Bowl	Campus sites		St. John Fisher; Allegheny*	Empire 8 PAC	St. John Fisher 24; Allegheny 21
Nov 21	1:00 PM	Chapman Bowl	Campus sites		Alfred State; Hobart*	Empire 8 Liberty	Alfred State 14; Hobart 63
Nov 21	12:00 PM	Lakefront Bowl	Raabe Stadium; Wauwatosa, Wisconsin	JustAGame	St. Norbert; Chicago	MWC; NACC	St. Norbert 21; Chicago 28
Nov 21	12:00 PM	Fusion Bowl	Campus sites	Northeast Sports Network	Western New England; MIT*	CNE; NEWMAC	Western New England 14; MIT 24
Nov 21	12:00 PM	Cape Henry Bowl	Campus sites	FloSports	Randolph–Macon; Lycoming*	Landmark; ODAC	Randolph–Macon 21; Lycoming 17
Nov 21	12:00 PM	Cape Charles Bowl	Campus sites	FloSports	Wilkes; Washington & Lee*	Landmark; ODAC	Wilkes 21; Washington and Lee 7
Nov 21	3:00 PM	Isthmus Bowl	Bank of Sun Prairie Stadium; Sun Prairie, Wisconsin	JustAGame	Wisconsin–River Falls; Illinois Wesleyan	WIAC; CCIW	Wisconsin–River Falls 55; Illinois Wesleyan 24
Nov 21	1:00 PM	ForeverLawn Bowl	Tom Benson Hall of Fame Stadium; Canton, Ohio	FloSports	Ohio Northern; Mount St. Joseph	OAC; HCAC	Ohio Northern 14; Mount St. Joseph 21
Nov 21	6:00 PM	Extra Points Bowl	Tom Benson Hall of Fame Stadium; Canton, Ohio	FloSports	Grove City; John Carroll	PAC; NCAC	Grove City 19; John Carroll 43
Nov 21	1:00 PM	Riverbend; Bowl Series	Rocket Stadium; Neenah, Wisconsin	HomeTeam	Lake Forest; Coe	MWC; ARC	Lake Forest 24; Coe 21
Nov 21	6:00 PM	Riverbend; Bowl Series	Rocket Stadium; Neenah, Wisconsin	HomeTeam	Dubuque; Aurora	ARC; NACC	Dubuque 45; Aurora 42

* - Host team

== Coaching changes ==
=== Preseason and in-season ===
This is restricted to coaching changes that took place on or after May 1, 2026, and will include any changes announced after a team's last regularly scheduled games but before its playoff games.

School	Outgoing coach	Date	Reason	Replacement	Previous position
Hilbert	Ted Egger	Before June 17, 2026	Fired	John Noel	Hilbert defensive line coach (2023–2025)
Southern Virginia	Joe DuPaix	July 2, 2026	Resigned	Chris Ehorn Jr. (interim)	Southern Virginia defensive coordinator (2025)
Bluffton	Chris Hedden	September 11, 2026	Fired	Cody Crawford (interim)	Bluffton defensive coordinator
Albion	Travis Rundle	September 28, 2026	Fired	Stephen Wasil (interim)	Albion offensive coordinator and quarterbacks coach (2019–2026)
Thiel	Sam Bauman	October 16, 2026	Fired	Greg Polis (interim)	Thiel offensive coordinator (2025–2026)
Rhodes	Rich Duncan	October 28, 2026	Resigned	Matt Ellis (interim)	Rhodes defensive coordinator (2025–2026)
Bowdoin	B. J. Hammer	November 3, 2026	Fired	Nick Turchyn (interim)	Bowdoin tight ends coach (2026)

== See also ==
- 2026 NCAA Division I FBS football season
- 2026 NCAA Division I FCS football season
- 2026 NCAA Division II football season
- 2026 NAIA football season
- 2026 U Sports football season
- 2026 junior college football season
