= Mike Dyal =

American football player (born 1966)

No. 84, 87, 82
- Position: Tight end

Personal information
- Born: May 20, 1966 (age 60); San Antonio, Texas, U.S.
- Listed height: 6 ft 2 in (1.88 m)
- Listed weight: 240 lb (109 kg)

Career information
- High school: Tivy (Kerrville, Texas)
- College: Texas A&I (1984–1987)
- NFL draft: 1988: undrafted

Career history
- Los Angeles Raiders (1988–1991); Kansas City Chiefs (1992–1993); San Diego Chargers (1993)

Career NFL statistics
- Receptions: 38
- Receiving yards: 640
- Receiving touchdowns: 2
- Stats at Pro Football Reference

Michael Eben Dyal (born May 20, 1966) is an American former professional football player who was a tight end for four seasons in the National Football League (NFL) with the Los Angeles Raiders, Kansas City Chiefs, and San Diego Chargers. He played college football for the Texas A&I Javelinas.

== Early life and college ==
Michael Eben Dyal was born on May 20, 1966, in San Antonio, Texas. He attended Tivy High School in Kerrville, Texas.

Dyal was a four-year letterman for the Texas A&I Javelinas of Texas A&I University from 1984 to 1987. He graduated with a bachelor of business administration degree in 1990. He was inducted into the school's athletics hall of fame in 1993.

== Professional career ==
After going undrafted in the 1988 NFL draft, Dyal signed with the Los Angeles Raiders on April 28. He was placed on injured reserve on August 22, 1988, and missed the entire season. He started all 16 games for the Raiders in 1989, catching 27 passes for 499 yards and two touchdowns. Dyal's 18.5 yards per catch set a team record previously held by Dave Casper. Dyal was named the AFC Offensive Player of the Week for Week 13 of the 1989 season. The next year, he was placed on injured reserve on September 19, 1990, activated on December 2, and placed on injured reserve again on December 4, 1990. Overall, he appeared in three games, starting two, during the 1990 season and recorded three receptions for 51 yards. Dyal also played in two playoff games that year. He was placed on the reserve/physically unable to perform list on August 19, 1991, and ended up missing the entire season again. His contract expired in February 1992.

Dyal was signed by the Kansas City Chiefs on April 1, 1992. He was placed on the reserve/physically unable to perform list on August 25, activated on October 17, and placed on injured reserve on November 11, 1992. Overall, he played in three games for the Chiefs in 1992, catching one pass for seven yards on one target. Dyal appeared in six games during the 1993 season, totaling seven receptions for 83 yards on 15 targets. He was released on October 25, 1993.

Dyal signed with the San Diego Chargers on October 29, 1993. He played in four games for the Chargers that year but was not targeted any. He became a free agent after the season and re-signed with the Chargers on April 4, 1994. Dyal was released on August 17, 1994.
