= 2026 NCAA Division III football rankings =

American college football season rankings

- Season: 2026
- Postseason: Single-elimination
- Preseason No. 1: North Central

Two human polls and a committee's selections comprise the 2026 National Collegiate Athletic Association (NCAA) Division III football rankings. Unlike in Division I's Football Bowl Subdivision (FBS), the NCAA, Division III college football's governing body, bestows a national championship on the winner of the Stagg Bowl – the championship round of a 40-team postseason tournament. The two main weekly polls that begin in the preseason are the D3football.com poll and the AFCA Coaches Poll, which rank the top 25 colleges in Division III football.

== Legend ==
	Increase in ranking
	Decrease in ranking
	Not ranked previous week
	Selected for Division III Football Championship Playoffs
(#–#)	Win–loss record
(Italics)	Number of first place votes
т	Tied with team above or below also with this symbol

== D3football.com poll ==
	Preseason July 20	Week 1 September 6	Week 2 September 13	Week 3 September 20	Week 4 September 27	Week 5 October 4	Week 6 October 11	Week 7 October 18	Week 8 October 25	Week 9 November 1	Week 10 November 8	Week 11 November 15	Final	
1.	North Central (25)	North Central (1–0) (25)	North Central (2–0) (25)	North Central (3–0) (20)	North Central (3–0) (20)	North Central (4–0) (24)	Wheaton (IL) (6–0) (23)	Wheaton (IL) (7–0) (21)	Wheaton (IL) (7–0) (20)	Wheaton (IL) (8–0) (17)	Wheaton (IL) (9–0) (18)	Wheaton (IL) (10–0) (16)		1.
2.	Bethel (MN)	Wheaton (IL) (1–0)	Wheaton (IL) (2–0)	Wisconsin–River Falls (3–0) (5)	Wisconsin–River Falls (3–0) (5)	Wheaton (IL) (5–0)	Saint John's (MN) (5–0) (1)	Wisconsin–Platteville (6–0) (3)	Wisconsin–Platteville (7–0) (4)	Wisconsin–Platteville (8–0) (7)	Wisconsin–Whitewater (9–0) (7)	Wisconsin–Whitewater (10–0) (9)		2.
3.	Mount Union	Johns Hopkins (1–0)	Wisconsin–Platteville (2–0)	Wheaton (IL) (3–0)	Wheaton (IL) (4–0)	Saint John's (MN) (4–0) (1)	North Central (IL) (4–1)	Saint John's (MN) (6–0)	Saint John's (MN) (7–0)	Saint John's (MN) (8–0)	Saint John's (MN) (9–0)	Saint John's (MN) (10–0)		3.
4.	Johns Hopkins	Wisconsin–Platteville (1–0)	Wisconsin–River Falls (2–0)	Wisconsin–Platteville (3–0)	Wisconsin–Platteville (3–0)	Wisconsin–Platteville (4–0)	Wisconsin–Whitewater (5–0) (1)	North Central (IL) (5–1)	North Central (IL) (6–1)	Wisconsin–Whitewater (8–0) (1)	North Central (IL) (8–1)	Wisconsin–Platteville (9–1)		4.
5.	Wheaton (IL)	Bethel (MN) (0–1)	Saint John's (MN) (1–0)	Saint John's (MN) (2–0)	Saint John's (MN) (3–0)	Wisconsin–Whitewater (4–0)	Wisconsin–Platteville (5–0)	Wisconsin–Whitewater (6–0) (1)	Wisconsin–Whitewater (7–0) (1)	North Central (IL) (7–1)	Wisconsin–Platteville (8–1)	North Central (IL) (9–1)		5.
6.	Wisconsin–Platteville	Wisconsin–River Falls (1–0)	Wartburg (1–1)	Wisconsin–Whitewater (2–0)	Wisconsin–Whitewater (3–0)	Wisconsin–River Falls (3–1)	Wisconsin–River Falls (4–1)	Hardin–Simmons (5–0)	Hardin–Simmons (6–0)	Hardin–Simmons (7–0)	Hardin–Simmons (8–0)	Endicott (10–0)		6.
7.	Wisconsin–River Falls	Mount Union (0–1)	Bethel (MN) (0–1)	John Carroll (3–0)	Bethel (MN) (2–1)	Hardin–Simmons (3–0)	Hardin–Simmons (4–0)	Endicott (6–0)	Endicott (7–0)	Endicott (8–0)	Endicott (9–0)	Cortland (10–0)		7.
8.	John Carroll	Saint John's (MN) (1–0)	Mount Union (1–1)	Hardin–Simmons (2–0)	John Carroll (4–0)	Trinity (TX) (4–0)	Trinity (TX) (5–0)	Washington (MO) (6–0)	Washington (MO) (7–0)	Washington (MO) (8–0)	Washington (MO) (9–0)	Washington (MO) (10–0)		8.
9.	Wartburg	Wartburg (1–0)	Wisconsin–Whitewater (2–0)	Bethel (MN) (1–1)	Hardin–Simmons (2–0)	Endicott (5–0)	Endicott (5–0)	Hope (6–0)	Hope (7–0)	Hope (8–0)	Cortland (9–0)	Baldwin Wallace (10–0)		9.
10.	Wisconsin–La Crosse	John Carroll (1–0)	John Carroll (2–0)	Trinity (TX) (3–0)	Trinity (TX) (3–0)	Washington (MO) (5–0)	Washington (MO) (5–0)	Christopher Newport (6–0)	Christopher Newport (7–0)	Cortland (8–0)	Christopher Newport (9–0)	Mary Hardin–Baylor (9–1)		10.
11.	Saint John's (MN)	Wisconsin–Whitewater (1–0)	Hardin–Simmons (2–0)	Wartburg (1–2)	Endicott (4–0)	Wartburg (2–2)	Wartburg (3–2)	Wartburg (4–2)	Cortland (7–0)	Christopher Newport (8–0)	Baldwin Wallace (9–0)	Hardin–Simmons (8–1)		11.
12.	Wisconsin–Whitewater	Wisconsin–La Crosse (0–1)	Trinity (TX) (2–0)	Endicott (3–0)	Wartburg (1–2)	Salisbury (4–0)	Hope (5–0)	Cortland (6–0)	Wartburg (5–2)	Wartburg (6–2)	Wartburg (7–2)	Wartburg (8–2)		12.
13.	DePauw	Trinity (TX) (1–0)	Johns Hopkins (1–1)	Salisbury (2–0)	Salisbury (3–0)	Christopher Newport (4–0)	Christopher Newport (5–0)	Wisconsin–River Falls (4–2)	Baldwin Wallace (7–0)	Baldwin Wallace (8–0)	Mary Hardin–Baylor (8–1)	Calvin (10–0)		13.
14.	Trinity (TX)	Hardin–Simmons (1–0)	Salisbury (1–0)	Susquehanna (3–0)	Christopher Newport (3–0)	Hope (5–0)	Cortland (5–0)	John Carroll (5–1)	John Carroll (6–1)	Wisconsin–River Falls (6–2)	Bethel (MN) (7–2)	Bethel (MN) (8–2)		14.
15.	Hardin–Simmons	DePauw (1–0)	Berry (2–0)	Berry (3–0)	Hope (4–0)	Cortland (5–0)	Bethel (MN) (3–2)	Bethel (MN) (4–2)	Wisconsin–River Falls (5–2)	Mary Hardin–Baylor (7–1)	Calvin (9–0)	DePauw (9–1)		15.
16.	Berry	Berry (1–0)	Mary Hardin–Baylor (2–0)	Hope (3–0)	Berry (3–0)	Bethel (MN) (2–2)	John Carroll (4–1)	Baldwin Wallace (6–0)	Bethel (MN) (5–2)	Bethel (MN) (6–2)	DePauw (8–1)	Trinity (TX) (9–1)		16.
17.	Salisbury	Salisbury (0–0)	Hope (2–0)	Christopher Newport (2–0)	Cortland (4–0)	John Carroll (4–1)	Baldwin Wallace (5–0)	Mary Hardin–Baylor (5–1)	Mary Hardin–Baylor (6–1)	DePauw (7–1)	Trinity (TX) (8–1)	Christopher Newport (9–1)		17.
18.	Christopher Newport	Hope (1–0)	Christopher Newport (2–0)	Cortland (3–0)	Washington (MO) (4–0)	Wisconsin–La Crosse (2–2)	Mary Hardin–Baylor (4–1)	Trinity (TX) (5–1)	Trinity (TX) (6–1)	Trinity (TX) (7–1)	Susquehanna (8–1)	Susquehanna (9–1)		18.
19.	Hope	Mary Hardin–Baylor (1–0)	Linfield (1–0)	Wisconsin–La Crosse (1–2)	Wisconsin–La Crosse (1–2)	Mary Hardin–Baylor (3–1)	Berry (4–1)	Berry (5–1)	Berry (6–1)	Susquehanna (7–1)	Hope (8–1)	Hope (9–1)		19.
20.	Susquehanna	Christopher Newport (1–0)	Endicott (2–0)	Washington (MO) (3–0)	Mary Hardin–Baylor (2–1)	Baldwin Wallace (4–0)	Wisconsin–La Crosse (2–3)	Wisconsin–La Crosse (3–3)	Susquehanna (6–1)	Linfield (6–1)	Chapman (8–1)	Utica (9–1)		20.
21.	Mary Hardin–Baylor	Coe (1–0)	Wisconsin–La Crosse (0–2)	Mary Hardin–Baylor (2–1)	Heidelberg (4–0)	Berry (3–1)	Salisbury (4–1)	Susquehanna (5–1)	Linfield (5–1)	Chapman (7–1)	Utica (8–1)	Linfield (8–1)		21.
22.	Coe	Linfield (1–0)	Washington (MO) (2–0)	Heidelberg (3–0)	Utica (4–0)	Franklin & Marshall (4–0)	Susquehanna (4–1)	Linfield (4–1)	Chapman (6–1)	Utica (7–1)	Linfield (7–1)	Washington & Jefferson (9–1)		22.
23.	Cortland	Susquehanna (1–0)	Cortland (2–0)	Utica (3–0)	Susquehanna (3–1)	Randolph–Macon (3–1)	Linfield (3–1)	Salisbury (5–1)	Rowan (6–1)	John Carroll (6–2)	John Carroll (7–2)	John Carroll (8–2)		23.
24.	Endicott	Cortland (1–0)	Susquehanna (2–0)	Mount Union (1–2)	Mount Union (1–2)	Susquehanna (3–1)	Rowan (4–1)	Rowan (5–1)	Heidelberg (6–1)	Rowan (6–2)	Rowan (7–2)	Springfield (9–1)		24.
25.	Randolph–Macon	Endicott (1–0)	Randolph–Macon (1–1)	Randolph–Macon (2–1)	Randolph–Macon (2–1)	Heidelberg (4–1)	Heidelberg (4–1)	Heidelberg (5–1)	DePauw (6–1)	Calvin (8–0)	Washington & Jefferson (8–1)	Wisconsin–River Falls (7–3)		25.
	Preseason July 20	Week 1 September 6	Week 2 September 13	Week 3 September 20	Week 4 September 27	Week 5 October 4	Week 6 October 11	Week 7 October 18	Week 8 October 25	Week 9 November 1	Week 10 November 8	Week 11 November 15	Final	
		Dropped: No. 25 Randolph–Macon	Dropped: No. 15 DePauw; No. 21 Coe	Dropped: No. 13 Johns Hopkins; No. 19 Linfield	None	Dropped: No. 22 Utica; No. 24 Mount Union	Dropped: No. 22 Franklin & Marshall; No. 23 Randolph–Macon	None	Dropped: No. 20 Wisconsin–La Crosse; No. 23 Salisbury	Dropped: No. 19 Berry; No. 24 Heidelberg	Dropped: No. 14 Wisconsin–River Falls	Dropped: No. 20 Chapman; No. 24 Rowan	None	

== AFCA Coaches Poll ==
	Preseason August 24	Week 1 September 8	Week 2 September 14	Week 3 September 21	Week 4 September 28	Week 5 October 5	Week 6 October 12	Week 7 October 19	Week 8 October 26	Week 9 November 2	Week 10 November 9	Week 11 November 16	Final	
1.	North Central (50)	North Central (1–0) (52)	North Central (2–0) (52)	North Central (3–0) (46)	North Central (3–0) (44)	North Central (4–0) (53)	Wheaton (IL) (6–0) (50)	Wheaton (IL) (7–0) (41)	Wheaton (IL) (7–0) (37)	Wheaton (IL) (8–0) (36)	Wheaton (IL) (9–0) (37)	Wheaton (IL) (10–0) (37)		1.
2.	Bethel (MN)	Wheaton (IL) (1–0)	Wheaton (IL) (2–0)	Wheaton (IL) (3–0)	Wisconsin–River Falls (3–0) (9)	Wheaton (5–0)	Saint John's (MN) (5–0) (1)	Wisconsin–Platteville (6–0) (11)	Wisconsin–Platteville (7–0) (15)	Wisconsin–Platteville (8–0) (16)	Wisconsin–Whitewater (9–0) (16)	Wisconsin–Whitewater (10–0) (16)		2.
3.	Mount Union	Johns Hopkins (1–0)	Wisconsin–Platteville (2–0)	Wisconsin–River Falls (3–0) (7)	Wheaton (IL) (4–0)	Saint John's (MN) (4–0)	Wisconsin–Platteville (5–0)	Saint John's (MN) (6–0)	Saint John's (MN) (7–0)	Saint John's (MN) (8–0)	Saint John's (MN) (9–0)	Saint John's (MN) (10–0)		3.
4.	Johns Hopkins	Wisconsin–Platteville (1–0)	Wisconsin–River Falls (2–0) (1)	Wisconsin–Platteville (3–0)	Wisconsin–Platteville (3–0)	Wisconsin–Platteville (4–0)	North Central (IL) (4–1)	Wisconsin–Whitewater (6–0) (1)	Wisconsin–Whitewater (7–0) (1)	Wisconsin–Whitewater (8–0) (1)	North Central (IL) (8–1)	North Central (IL) (9–1)		4.
5.	Wheaton (IL)	Wisconsin–River Falls (1–0) (1)	Saint John's (MN) (1–0)	Saint John's (MN) (2–0)	Saint John's (MN) (3–0)	Wisconsin–Whitewater (4–0)	Wisconsin–Whitewater (5–0) (2)	North Central (IL) (5–1)	North Central (IL) (6–1)	North Central (IL) (7–1)	Hardin–Simmons (8–0)	Wisconsin–Platteville (9–1)		5.
6.	Wisconsin–Platteville	Mount Union (0–1)	John Carroll (2–0)	John Carroll (3–0)	John Carroll (4–0)	Trinity (TX) (4–0)	Trinity (TX) (5–0)	Hardin–Simmons (5–0)	Hardin–Simmons (6–0)	Hardin–Simmons (7–0)	Wisconsin–Platteville (8–1)	Washington (MO) (10–0)		6.
7.	Wisconsin–River Falls (3)	Bethel (MN) (0–1)	Bethel (MN) (0–1)	Wisconsin–Whitewater (2–0)	Wisconsin–Whitewater (3–0)	Hardin–Simmons (3–0) т	Hardin–Simmons (4–0)	Washington (MO) (6–0)	Washington (MO) (7–0)	Washington (MO) (8–0)	Washington (MO) (9–0)	Endicott (10–0)		7.
8.	John Carroll	Saint John's (MN) (1–0)	Mount Union (1–1)	Bethel (MN) (1–1)	Bethel (MN) (2–1)	Wisconsin–River Falls (3–1) т	Wisconsin–River Falls (4–1)	Christopher Newport (6–0)	Christopher Newport (7–0)	Hope (8–0)	Christopher Newport (9–0)	Cortland (10–0)		8.
9.	Wartburg	John Carroll (1–0)	Wisconsin–Whitewater (2–0)	Trinity (TX) (3–0)	Trinity (TX) (3–0)	Salisbury (4–0)	Washington (MO) (5–0)	Hope (6–0)	Hope (7–0)	Christopher Newport (8–0)	Endicott (9–0)	Baldwin Wallace (10–0) т		9.
10.	Wisconsin–La Crosse	Wartburg (1–0)	Wartburg (1–1)	Hardin–Simmons (2–0)	Hardin–Simmons (2–0)	Christopher Newport (4–0)	Christopher Newport (5–0)	Endicott (6–0)	Endicott (7–0)	Endicott (8–0)	Cortland (9–0)	Mary Hardin–Baylor (9–1) т		10.
11.	Saint John's (MN)	Wisconsin–Whitewater (1–0)	Trinity (TX) (2–0)	Berry (3–0)	Berry (3–0)	Washington (MO) (5–0)	Hope (5–0)	Cortland (6–0)	Cortland (7–0)	Cortland (8–0)	Baldwin Wallace (9–0)	Calvin (10–0)		11.
12.	Wisconsin–Whitewater	Trinity (TX) (1–0)	Hardin–Simmons (2–0)	Salisbury (2–0)	Salisbury (3–0)	Hope (5–0)	Endicott (5–0)	John Carroll (5–1)	John Carroll (6–1)	Wartburg (6–2)	Wartburg (7–2)	Wartburg (8–2)		12.
13.	DePauw	DePauw (1–0)	Berry (2–0)	Susquehanna (3–0)	Christopher Newport (3–0)	Endicott (5–0)	Cortland (5–0)	Wartburg (4–2)	Wartburg (5–2)	Mary Hardin–Baylor (7–1)	Mary Hardin–Baylor (8–1)	Hardin–Simmons (8–1)		13.
14.	Trinity (TX)	Wisconsin–La Crosse (0–1)	Salisbury (1–0)	Christopher Newport (2–0)	Hope (4–0)	Cortland (5–0)	John Carroll (4–1)	Mary Hardin–Baylor (5–1)	Mary Hardin–Baylor (6–1)	Baldwin Wallace (8–0)	Calvin (9–0)	Trinity (TX) (9–1)		14.
15.	Berry	Berry (1–0)	Johns Hopkins (1–1)	Hope (3–0)	Endicott (4–0)	John Carroll (4–1)	Wartburg (3–2)	Trinity (TX) (5–1)	Trinity (TX) (6–1)	Trinity (TX) (7–1)	Trinity (TX) (8–1)	DePauw (9–1)		15.
16.	Hardin–Simmons	Hardin–Simmons (1–0)	Christopher Newport (2–0)	Endicott (3–0)	Cortland (4–0)	Wartburg (2–2)	Mary Hardin–Baylor (4–1)	Bethel (MN) (4–2)	Baldwin Wallace (7–0)	Bethel (MN) (6–2)	Bethel (MN) (7–2)	Bethel (MN) (8–2)		16.
17.	Salisbury	Salisbury (0–0)	Mary Hardin–Baylor (2–0)	Cortland (3–0)	Washington (MO) (4–0)	Bethel (MN) (2–2)	Bethel (MN) (3–2)	Wisconsin–River Falls (4–2)	Bethel (MN) (5–2)	DePauw (7–1)	DePauw (8–1)	Susquehanna (9–1)		17.
18.	Christopher Newport	Christopher Newport (1–0)	Hope (2–0)	Wartburg (1–2)	Wartburg (1–2)	Mary Hardin–Baylor (3–1)	Berry (4–1)	Baldwin Wallace (6–0)	Wisconsin–River Falls (5–2)	Wisconsin–River Falls (6–2)	Susquehanna (8–1)	Christopher Newport (9–1)		18.
19.	Hope	Mary Hardin–Baylor (1–0)	Susquehanna (2–0)	Washington (MO) (3–0)	Wisconsin–La Crosse (1–2)	Berry (3–1)	Salisbury (4–1)	Berry (5–1)	Berry (6–1)	Susquehanna (7–1)	Hope (8–1)	Hope (9–1)		19.
20.	Mary Hardin–Baylor	Hope (1–0)	Linfield (1–0)	Wisconsin–La Crosse (1–2)	Mary Hardin–Baylor (2–1)	Wisconsin–La Crosse (2–2)	Baldwin Wallace (5–0)	Salisbury (5–1)	Susquehanna (6–1)	Calvin (8–0)	Springfield (8–1)	Springfield (9–1)		20.
21.	Susquehanna	Coe (1–0)	Cortland (2–0)	Mary Hardin–Baylor (2–1)	Utica (4–0)	Franklin & Marshall (4–0)	Susquehanna (4–1)	Susquehanna (5–1)	DePauw (6–1)	Lake Forest (8–0)	Lake Forest (9–0)	Utica (9–1)		21.
22.	Coe	Susquehanna (1–0)	Endicott (2–0)	DePauw (2–1)	Susquehanna (3–1)	Susquehanna (3–1)	DePauw (4–1)	DePauw (5–1)	Calvin (7–0)	Springfield (7–1)	Utica (8–1)	Linfield (8–1)		22.
23.	Randolph–Macon	Linfield (1–0)	Wisconsin–La Crosse (0–2) т	Mount Union (1–2)	DePauw (3–1)	DePauw (4–1)	Calvin (5–0)	Calvin (6–0)	Lake Forest (7–0)	John Carroll (6–2)	John Carroll (7–2) т	John Carroll (8–2)		23.
24.	Endicott	Cortland (1–0)	Washington (MO) (2–0) т	Utica (3–0)	Heidelberg (4–0)	Baldwin Wallace (4–0)	Lake Forest (6–0)	Lake Forest (7–0)	Rowan (6–1)	Utica (7–1)	Linfield (7–1) т	Washington & Jefferson (9–1)		24.
25.	Cortland	Endicott (1–0)	DePauw (1–1)	Franklin & Marshall (3–0)	Franklin & Marshall (3–0)	Randolph–Macon (3–1)	Rowan (4–1)	Ursinus (6–0)	Heidelberg (6–1)	Linfield (6–1)	Chapman (8–1)	Hampden–Sydney (9–1)		25.
	Preseason August 24	Week 1 September 8	Week 2 September 14	Week 3 September 21	Week 4 September 28	Week 5 October 5	Week 6 October 12	Week 7 October 19	Week 8 October 26	Week 9 November 2	Week 10 November 9	Week 11 November 16	Final	
		Dropped: No. 23 Randolph–Macon	Dropped: No. 21 Coe	Dropped: No. 15 Johns Hopkins; No. 20 Linfield	Dropped: No. 23 Mount Union	Dropped: No. 21 Utica; No. 24 Heidelberg	Dropped: No. 20 Wisconsin–La Crosse; No. 21 Franklin & Marshall; No. 25 Randolph–Macon	Dropped: No. 25 Rowan	Dropped: No. 20 Salisbury; No. 25 Ursinus	Dropped: No. 19 Berry; No. 24 Rowan; No. 25 Heidelberg	Dropped: No. 18 Wisconsin–River Falls	Dropped: No. 21 Lake Forest; No. 25 Chapman	None	
