= Kerrville Independent School District =

School district in Texas, United States

Location
- 1009 Barnett Street, Kerrville, TX, 78028 United States of America

District information
- Type: Public
- Grades: PK – 12
- Superintendent: Dr. Brent Ringo
- Schools: 8

Other information
- Website: www.kerrvilleisd.net

Kerrville Independent School District is a public school district based in Kerrville, Texas (USA).The superintendent of the District is Brent Ringo. The Texas Education Association (TEA) Accountability Ratings were released on July 31, 2009 and Kerrville Independent School District has been confirmed as a Recognized District for the third year in a row.

In 2009, the school district was rated "recognized" by the Texas Education Agency.

== Schools ==
=== Tivy High School ===
Home of the Fighting Antlers, Tivy High School is located at 3250 Loop 534. The Principal of Tivy is Rick Sralla.

=== Hal Peterson Middle School ===
Hal Peterson Middle School is located at 3175 Loop 534. The Principal is Sonerka Mouton.

=== Tom Daniels Elementary School ===
Daniels Elementary School is located at 2002 Singing Wind. The Principal is Amy Billeiter.

=== Fred H. Tally Elementary School ===
Fred H. Tally Elementary (colloquially Tally Elementary ) is located at 1840 Goat Creek Pkwy. The Principal of is Gena Carpenter.

=== Nimitz Elementary School ===
Nimitz Elementary is located at 100 Valley View Dr. The Principal is Julie Johnson.

=== Starkey Elementary School ===
Starkey Elementary School is located at 1030 West Main. The principal is Jenna Wentrcek.

== Other Schools ==
- Hill Country High School
- Early Childhood Center (ECC); Head Start, Prekindergarten (PK), Early Childhood Special Education(ECSE), Tivy Child Development Center (TCDC)
- Disciplinary Alternative Education
