= Tivy High School =

Public school in Texas, United States

Location
- 3250 Loop 534; Kerrville, Texas 78028-2698; United States; 30.0373°N 99.1098°W

Information
- School type: Public high school
- School district: Kerrville Independent School District
- Principal: Rick Sralla
- Teaching staff: 94.55 (FTE)
- Grades: 9-12
- Enrollment: 1,374 (2025-2026)
- Student to teacher ratio: 14.75
- Colors: Blue and gold
- Athletics conference: UIL Class AAAAA
- Mascot: Scrappy
- Newspaper: Tivy Tattler
- Yearbook: The Antler
- Website: tivy.kerrvilleisd.net

Tivy High School is a public high school located in Kerrville, Texas, United States. It is classified as a 5A school by the UIL, and is a part of the Kerrville Independent School District located in east central Kerr County. In 2015, the school was rated "Met Standard" by the Texas Education Agency.

== Athletics ==
Tivy competes in Volleyball, Cross Country, Football, Basketball, Soccer, Golf, Tennis, Track, Baseball & Softball.

=== State titles ===
- Boys Basketball -
  - 1969(3A), 1970(3A)
- Girls Golf -
  - 1980(3A), 1981(3A)

==== State Finalist ====
- Girls Basketball -
  - 2006(4A)
- Football -
  - 1936(3A)

== Band ==
The marching season for the Tivy High School Band begins when school starts and end after Area/State UIL contest, which is before the end of the 1st semester. During the 2nd semester, marching band students transition to concert band.

=== Tivy High School Marching Band ===
The Tivy HS Marching Band participates in UIL Marching Contest every year. UIL Area and State Contest are held in alternate years to keep down the cost. Tivy HS Marching Band falls under 5A, which is measured by the student enrollment to the school and is located in Area H.

=== Concert Band ===
Concert Band consist of Symphonic Band and Wind Ensemble. The Wind Ensemble usually plays grade 4-5 music, and the Symphonic Band plays grade 2-3 and sometimes grade 4 music.

== Academics ==
=== State Titles ===
- UIL Boys Team Debate Champions
  - 1965(3A)
- UIL Accounting Team Champions
  - 2022(5A), 2026(5A)

=== State Finalist ===
- UIL Accounting Team Runner-Ups
  - 2023(5A), 2025(5A)
- UIL Accounting Team 3rd Place
  - 2021(5A), 2024(5A)

== Theater ==
- One Act Play
  - 2000(4A)

== Notable alumni ==
- Chester Nimitz, fleet admiral in the United States Navy and commander-in-chief of the Pacific fleet as well as all Allied land, air and sea forces in the central Pacific theater during World War II.
- Asa Lacy, professional baseball pitcher in the Kansas City Royals organization.
- Mike Dyal, former football tight end for the Los Angeles Raiders, Kansas City Chiefs and San Diego Chargers
- Carter Blackburn, Sportscaster for ESPN and CBS
- Morgan Chesky, NBC News National Correspondent
- Johnny Manziel, Heisman Trophy recipient and former football quarterback for Texas A&M University and Cleveland Browns
