= 1983 Plymouth State Panthers football team =

American college football season

1983 Plymouth State Panthers football

NEFC co-champion

New England Bowl, W 35–24 vs. Massachusetts Maritime
- Conference: New England Football Conference
- Record: 9–2 (8–1 NEFC)
- Head coach: Jay Cottone (3rd season)
- Offensive coordinator: Gary Emanuel (1st season)
- Defensive coordinator: Lou Desloges (6th season)
- Home stadium: Currier Field

1983 New England Football Conference standings
	Conf.					Overall
Team	W		L		T	W		L		T
Plymouth State +	8	–	1	–	0	9	–	2	–	0
Massachusetts Maritime +	8	–	1	–	0	8	–	2	–	0
Nichols	7	–	2	–	0	7	–	2	–	0
Western Connecticut State	6	–	3	–	0	7	–	3	–	0
Bridgewater State	4	–	5	–	0	4	–	5	–	0
Western New England	4	–	5	–	0	4	–	5	–	0
Framingham State	3	–	6	–	0	3	–	6	–	0
Maine Maritime	3	–	6	–	0	3	–	6	–	0
Westfield State	2	–	7	–	0	2	–	7	–	0
Curry	0	–	9	–	0	0	–	9	–	0
+ – Conference co-champions

The 1983 Plymouth State Panthers football team was an American football team that represented Plymouth State University as a member of the New England Football Conference (NEFC) during the 1983 NCAA Division III football season. In their third year under head coach Jay Cottone, the Panthers compiled a 9–2 record (8–1 against NEFC opponents), shared the NEFC championship, outscored opponents by a total of 358 to 120, and won the inaugural ECAC New England Bowl over Massachusetts Maritime.

Plymouth State entered the season with a nineteen-game win streak that spanned to the beginning of the 1981 season. It was the longest win streak at any level of college football.

The team was led by quarterback John Sperzel who finished the season with 619 passing yards, twelve touchdowns, and five interceptions. The original starter was Larry Cummings, but he suffered a back injury and a shoulder tear in the third week. Sophomore running back Joe Dudek rushed for 1,483 yards on 247 carries (134.8 yards per game), scored fifteen touchdowns, and was later inducted into the College Football Hall of Fame.

The team played its home games at Currier Field in Plymouth, New Hampshire. The field was renamed in honor of former head coach and offensive coordinator Charlie Currier who died after the 1982 season. Offensive line coach and head basketball coach Gary Emanuel was promoted to offensive coordinator following Currier's death.

== Schedule ==
Date	Opponent	Site	Result	Attendance	Source
September 10	at Norwich*	Sabine Field; Northfield, VT	L 0–31	4,500	
September 17	at Nichols	Dudley, MA	W 33–7	2,500	
September 24	Western Connecticut	Currier Field; Plymouth, NH	W 27–0	3,113	
October 1	Westfield State	Currier Field; Plymouth, NH	W 40–0	5,492	
October 8	at Massachusetts Maritime	Buzzards Bay, MA	L 19–22	1,500	
October 15	Framingham State	Currier Field; Plymouth, NH	W 38–0	3,207	
October 22	at Maine Maritime	Ritchie Field; Castine, ME	W 42–21	1,500	
October 29	Western New England	Currier Field; Plymouth, NH	W 34–0	1,537	
November 5	at Bridgewater State	Bridgewater, MA	W 38–8	1,000	
November 12	Curry	Currier Field; Plymouth, NH	W 52–7	2,000	
November 19	at Massachusetts Maritime*	Buzzards Bay, MA (New England Bowl)	W 35–24		
*Non-conference game
