= 1982 Plymouth State Panthers football team =

American college football season

1982 Plymouth State Panthers football

NEFC champion Lambert Trophy
- Conference: New England Football Conference
- Record: 10–0 (9–0 NEFC)
- Head coach: Jay Cottone (2nd season)
- Offensive coordinator: Charlie Currier (9th season)
- Defensive coordinator: Lou Desloges (5th season)
- Home stadium: Panther Field

1982 New England Football Conference standings
	Conf.					Overall
Team	W		L		T	W		L		T
Plymouth State $	9	–	0	–	0	10	–	0	–	0
Massachusetts Maritime	7	–	2	–	0	7	–	2	–	0
Maine Maritime	6	–	2	–	1	7	–	2	–	1
Bridgewater State	5	–	3	–	1	5	–	3	–	1
Nichols	5	–	4	–	0	5	–	4	–	0
Western New England	4	–	5	–	0	4	–	5	–	0
Framingham State	3	–	6	–	0	3	–	6	–	0
Western Connecticut State	2	–	7	–	0	2	–	7	–	0
Westfield State	2	–	7	–	0	2	–	7	–	0
Curry	1	–	8	–	0	1	–	8	–	0
$ – Conference champion

The 1982 Plymouth State Panthers football team was an American football team that represented Plymouth State University as a member of the New England Football Conference (NEFC) during the 1982 NCAA Division III football season. In their second year under head coach Jay Cottone, the Panthers compiled a perfect 10–0 record (9–0 against NEFC opponents), won the NEFC championship, outscored opponents by a total of 414 to 48, and received the Lambert Trophy as the best Division III team in the east. The team had a nine-game winning streak at the end of the 1981 season and extended that streak to 19 games. At the time, it was the longest active winning streak at any level of college football.

The team gave up only 122.2 yards and 4.8 points per game on defense while the offense averaged 41.4 points per game. Freshman running back Joe Dudek rushed for 1,094 yards on 123 carries (121.6 yards per game), scored 16 touchdowns, and was later inducted into the College Football Hall of Fame. Other statistical leaders included quarterback Kevin Bradley with 1,151 passing yards and Scott Anson with 37 catches for 529 receiving yards.

The team played its home games at Panther Field in Plymouth, New Hampshire.

== Schedule ==
Date	Opponent	Site	Result	Attendance	Source
September 11	Norwich*	Plymouth, NH	W 53–14	3,924	
September 18	Nichols	Plymouth, NH	W 47–0	1,949	
September 25	at Western Connecticut State	Danbury High School; Danbury, CT	W 46–0	850	
October 1	at Westfield State	Westfield, MA	W 43–0	1,500	
October 9	Massachusetts Maritime	Plymouth, NH	W 35–0	4,817	
October 16	at Framingham State	Framingham, MA	W 37–0	1,500	
October 23	Maine Maritime	Plymouth, NH	W 34–0	2,143–4,628	
October 30	at Western New England	Springfield, MA	W 28–6	1,200–2,100	
November 6	Bridgewater State	Plymouth, NH	W 35–15	1,814–2,133	
November 13	at Curry	Milton, MA	W 56–13	800–1,200	
*Non-conference game
