= 1981 Plymouth State Panthers football team =

American college football season

1981 Plymouth State Panthers football

NEFC champion
- Conference: New England Football Conference
- Record: 9–1 (9–0 NEFC)
- Head coach: Jay Cottone (1st season)
- Offensive coordinator: Charlie Currier (8th season)
- Defensive coordinator: Lou Desloges (4th season)
- Home stadium: Panther Field

1981 New England Football Conference standings
	Conf.					Overall
Team	W		L		T	W		L		T
Plymouth State $	9	–	0	–	0	9	–	1	–	0
Maine Maritime	7	–	2	–	0	7	–	2	–	0
Massachusetts Maritime	6	–	3	–	0	6	–	3	–	0
Western New England	5	–	4	–	0	5	–	4	–	0
Nichols	5	–	4	–	0	5	–	4	–	0
Framingham State	4	–	5	–	0	4	–	5	–	0
Bridgewater State	3	–	6	–	0	3	–	6	–	0
Curry	3	–	6	–	0	3	–	6	–	0
Western Connecticut State	1	–	7	–	0	1	–	8	–	0
Boston State *	1	–	8	–	0	1	–	8	–	0
$ – Conference champion; * – Boston State's game against Norwich counted in the conference standings.

The 1981 Plymouth State Panthers football team was an American football team that represented Plymouth State University as a member of the New England Football Conference (NEFC) during the 1981 NCAA Division III football season. In their first year under head coach Jay Cottone, the Panthers compiled a 9–1 record (9–0 against NEFC opponents), won the NEFC championship, outscored opponents by a total of 239 to 57, and recorded a defensive shut out in half of the team's games.

The team was led by quarterback Kevin Bradley who finished the season with 835 passing yards, ten touchdowns, and nine interceptions.

This season was the team's first-ever conference title.

The team played its home games at Panther Field in Plymouth, New Hampshire.

After former head coach Jim Aguiar resigned in April 1981, Plymouth State hired former Norwich offensive coordinator and backfield coach Jay Cottone as the team's next head football coach.

== Schedule ==
Date	Opponent	Site	Result	Attendance	Source
September 12	at Norwich*	Sabine Field; Northfield, VT	L 0–17	2,000	
September 19	at Nichols	Dudley, MA	W 14–8	2,500	
September 26	Western Connecticut	Panther Field; Plymouth, NH	W 35–0	3,840	
October 3	Boston State	Panther Field; Plymouth, NH	W 34–0	1,400	
October 10	at Massachusetts Maritime	Buzzards Bay, MA	W 13–0	1,500	
October 17	Framingham State	Panther Field; Plymouth, NH	W 16–6	2,818	
October 24	at Maine Maritime	Ritchie Field; Castine, ME	W 21–14	1,000	
October 31	Western New England	Panther Field; Plymouth, NH	W 29–0	2,225	
November 7	at Bridgewater State	Bridgewater, MA	W 14–6	500	
November 14	Curry	Panther Field; Plymouth, NH	W 63–6	2,790	
*Non-conference game
