= 1984 Plymouth State Panthers football team =

American college football season

1984 Plymouth State Panthers football

NEFC champion L NCAA Division III Quarterfinal 14–26 vs. Union (NY)
- Conference: New England Football Conference
- Record: 10–1 (9–0 NEFC)
- Head coach: Jay Cottone (4th season)
- Offensive coordinator: Gary Emanuel (2nd season)
- Defensive coordinator: Lou Desloges (7th season)
- Home stadium: Currier Field

1984 New England Football Conference standings
	Conf.					Overall
Team	W		L		T	W		L		T
Plymouth State $^	9	–	0	–	0	10	–	1	–	0
Western Connecticut State	8	–	1	–	0	9	–	1	–	0
Curry	7	–	2	–	0	7	–	2	–	0
Massachusetts Maritime	6	–	3	–	0	6	–	3	–	0
Westfield State	4	–	5	–	0	4	–	5	–	0
Maine Maritime	3	–	5	–	1	4	–	5	–	1
Bridgewater State	2	–	7	–	0	2	–	7	–	0
Nichols	2	–	7	–	0	2	–	7	–	0
Western New England	2	–	7	–	0	2	–	7	–	0
Framingham State	1	–	7	–	1	1	–	7	–	1
$ – Conference champion; ^ – NCAA Division III playoff participant

The 1984 Plymouth State Panthers football team was an American football team that represented Plymouth State University as a member of the New England Football Conference (NEFC) during the 1984 NCAA Division III football season. In their fourth year under head coach Jay Cottone, the Panthers compiled a 10–1 record (9–0 against NEFC opponents), won the NEFC championship, outscored opponents by a total of 358 to 120, and received a bid to the NCAA Division III playoffs. The team lost to Union (NY) 14–26 in the quarterfinal.

The team was led by quarterback Larry Cummings, who finished the season with 1,516 passing yards, seventeen touchdowns, and four interceptions. Junior running back Joe Dudek rushed for 1,378 yards on 199 carries (125.3 yards per game), scored 21 touchdowns, and was later inducted into the College Football Hall of Fame.

Against Massachusetts Maritime, Dudek set the NCAA small college's record for career touchdowns with 43.

The team played its home games at Currier Field in Plymouth, New Hampshire.

== Schedule ==
Date	Opponent	Site	Result	Attendance	Source
September 8	Norwich*	Currier Field; Plymouth, NH	W 21–15	4,300	
September 15	Nichols	Currier Field; Plymouth, NH	W 52–7	1,300	
September 22	at Western Connecticut	Danbury, CT	W 23–16	2,000	
September 29	at Westfield State	Alumni Field; Westfield, MA	W 34–6	1,105	
October 6	Massachusetts Maritime	Currier Field; Plymouth, NH	W 34–21	4,500	
October 13	at Framingham State	Framingham, MA	W 42–0	1,500	
October 20	Maine Maritime	Currier Field; Plymouth, NH	W 38–0	4,000	
October 27	at Bridgewater State	Bridgewater, MA	W 28–7	1,000	
November 3	Western New England	Currier Field; Plymouth, NH	W 50–0	1,100	
November 10	at Curry	Milton, MA	W 43–14	2,502	
November 17	at Union (NY)*	Schenectady, NY (NCAA Division III Quarterfinal)	L 14–26		
*Non-conference game
