= Jay Cottone =

American football coach & player (born c.1949)

Biographical details
- Born: c. 1949 (age 76–77)

Playing career
- 1968–1970: Norwich
- Position: Quarterback

Coaching career (HC unless noted)
- 1976: Norwich (ST/JV)
- 1977–1978: Norwich (ST/LB/DB)
- 1979: Norwich (backfield)
- 1980: Norwich (OC/backfield)
- 1981–1985: Plymouth State
- 1986–1987: UMass (QB/WR)
- 1988–1995: Hall HS (CT)

Head coaching record
- Overall: 46–7 (college); 33–41–3 (high school)
- Bowls: 1–1
- Tournaments: 0–1 (NCAA D-III playoffs)

Accomplishments and honors

Championships
- 5 NEFC (1981–1985)

Joseph R. "Jay" Cottone (born c. 1949) is an American former football coach. He served as head football coach at Plymouth State University in Plymouth, New Hampshire from 1981 to 1985, compiling a record of 46–7 and leading the Panthers to five consecutive New England Football Conference (NEFC) titles.

Cottone played college football as a quarterback at Norwich University in Northfield, Vermont from 1968 to 1970 and served as an assistant football coach from 1976 to 1980. He resigned from his position at Plymouth State University in July 1986 to become an assistant at the University of Massachusetts Amherst (UMass) under head coach Jim Reid. In 1988, Cottone was hired as the head football coach at Hall High School in West Hartford, Connecticut. He resigned in 1995 after amassing a record of 33–41–3 in eight seasons.

== Head coaching record ==
=== College ===
Year	Team	Overall	Conference	Standing	Bowl/playoffs
Plymouth State Panthers (New England Football Conference) (1981–1985)
1981	Plymouth State	9–1	9–0	1st	
1982	Plymouth State	10–0	9–0	1st	
1983	Plymouth State	9–2	8–1	T–1st	W New England
1984	Plymouth State	10–1	9–0	1st	L NCAA Division III Quarterfinal
1985	Plymouth State	8–3	8–1	T–1st	L North
Plymouth State:		46–7	43–2		
Total:		46–7			
National championship Conference title Conference division title or championship game berth
