= Paul Castonia =

American football coach (born 1965)

Current position
- Title: Co-head coach
- Team: Plymouth State
- Conference: MASCAC
- Record: 112–112

Biographical details
- Born: c. 1965 (age 60–61)
- Education: Trinity College (1986); University of Rhode Island (1989)

Coaching career (HC unless noted)
- 1986–1988: Rhode Island (GA)
- 1989–1991: Maryland (GA)
- 1992: Hartwick (OC/ST)
- 1993–1996: Ferrum (OC/ST)
- 1997: Lynn Classical HS (MA) (assistant)
- 1998–2000: UMass Boston
- 2001–2002: Bryant (DC)
- 2003–2019: Plymouth State
- 2020–present: Plymouth State (co-HC)

Head coaching record
- Overall: 114–140
- Bowls: 2–1
- Tournaments: 0–2 (NCAA D-III playoffs)

Accomplishments and honors

Championships
- 1 NEFC (2008); 2 MASCAC (2017, 2025)

Paul Castonia (born c. 1965) is an American college football coach. He is the co-head football coach for Plymouth State University, a position he has held since 2020. He also was the head football coach for University of Massachusetts Boston from 1998 to 2000. He previously coached for Rhode Island, Maryland, Hartwick, Ferrum, and Bryant.

== Head coaching record ==
Year	Team	Overall	Conference	Standing	Bowl/playoffs
UMass Boston Beacons (New England Football Conference) (1998–2000)
1998	UMass Boston	0–10	0–6	7th	
1999	UMass Boston	1–9	1–5	6th	
2000	UMass Boston	1–9	0–5	7th	
UMass Boston:		2–28	1–16		
Plymouth State Panthers (Freedom Football Conference) (2003)
2003	Plymouth State	0–10	0–6	7th	
Plymouth State Panthers (Independent) (2004–2005)
2004	Plymouth State	1–8			
2005	Plymouth State	4–6			
Plymouth State Panthers (New England Football Conference) (2006–2012)
2006	Plymouth State	4–5	4–3	T–3rd	
2007	Plymouth State	9–1	6–1	2nd	W North Atlantic
2008	Plymouth State	10–2	7–0	1st	L NCAA Division III First Round
2009	Plymouth State	8–3	6–1	2nd	L Northeast
2010	Plymouth State	6–4	4–3	T–4th	
2011	Plymouth State	4–6	2–5	5th	
2012	Plymouth State	2–8	1–6	T–6th	
Plymouth State Panthers (Massachusetts State Collegiate Athletic Conference) (2013–present)
2013	Plymouth State	2–8	1–7	T–8th	
2014	Plymouth State	1–9	0–8	9th	
2015	Plymouth State	2–8	1–7	T–8th	
2016	Plymouth State	6–4	4–4	T–3rd	
2017	Plymouth State	9–2	7–1	T–1st	L NCAA Division III First Round
2018	Plymouth State	6–4	5–3	4th	
2019	Plymouth State	6–4	5–3	T–5th	
2020–21	No team—COVID-19				
2021	Plymouth State	5–5	5–3	4th	
2022	Plymouth State	9–2	6–2	2nd	W New England
2023	Plymouth State	4–6	4–4	5th	
2024	Plymouth State	5–4	5–4	T–3rd	
2025	Plymouth State	8–2	7–2	T–1st	
2026	Plymouth State	1–1	0–1		
Plymouth State:		112–112	80–74		
Total:		114–140			
National championship Conference title Conference division title or championship game berth
