= Mike Kemp (American football) =

American football player and coach (born 1952)

Current position
- Title: Head coach
- Team: Erie
- Conference: NJCAA Division III independent
- Record: 20–28

Biographical details
- Born: c. 1952 (age 73–74); Brockport, New York, U.S.
- Education: University of Notre Dame (1975); Springfield College (1986)

Playing career
- 1971–1974: Notre Dame
- 1975–1981: Rochester Mustangs
- Position: Defensive back

Coaching career (HC unless noted)
- 1976–1979: Brockport HS (NY) (LB)
- 1980–1983: Brockport (DB)
- 1984–1986: Springfield (GA)
- 1986–1987: St. Lawrence (WR)
- 1987–1989: Connecticut (TE/OLB)
- 1990–1991: Penn (RB)
- 1991–1995: Cortland (OC)
- 1996–1998: Plymouth State
- 1999–2007: Utica
- 2008–2010: Brockport (ST/DB)
- 2011–2012: Holly Junior-Senior HS (NY) (DC)
- 2013–2014: Elba / Byron–Bergen HS (NY) (ST/QB)
- 2015: York–Pavilion HS (NY)
- 2016–2017: Norwich (QB)
- 2018–2020: Erie (ST/OL)
- 2021–present: Erie

Head coaching record
- Overall: 35–54 (college); 20–28 (junior college); 2–6 (high school)
- Bowls: 0–2

Michael Kemp (born c. 1952) is an American college football coach who is the head football coach for SUNY Erie, a position he has held since 2021. He was previously an assistant coach for Brockport High School, Brockport, Springfield, St. Lawrence, UConn, Penn, Cortland, Holly Senior-Junior High School, Elba / Byron–Bergen High School, Norwich, and SUNY Erie. He was the head coach for the Plymouth State Panthers football team from 1996 to 1998 and was the first head coach in program history for the Utica Pioneers football team from 2000 to 2007. He also coached the York–Pavilion High School football team in 2015.

== Head coaching record ==
=== College ===
Year	Team	Overall	Conference	Standing	Bowl/playoffs
Plymouth State Panthers (Freedom Football Conference) (1996–1998)
1996	Plymouth State	5–4	3–3	T–4th	
1997	Plymouth State	7–4	4–2	T–2nd	L Northwest
1998	Plymouth State	7–4	4–2	3rd	L Northeast
Plymouth State:		19–12	11–7		
Utica Pioneers (NCAA Division III independent) (2001)
2001	Utica	0–8			
Utica Pioneers (Empire 8) (2002–2007)
2002	Utica	1–9	0–4	5th	
2003	Utica	1–9	0–4	5th	
2004	Utica	3–7	1–5	6th	
2005	Utica	6–4	3–3	4th	
2006	Utica	3–7	1–5	6th	
2007	Utica	2–5 (Note: Kemp left the team after seven games and was replaced by Kirk Jellerson for the remainder of the season.)	0–3		
Utica:		16–42	5–24		
Total:		35–54			

=== Junior college ===
Year	Team	Overall	Conference	Standing	Bowl/playoffs	NJCAA D3^{#}
Erie Kats (NJCAA Division III independent) (2021–present)
2021	Erie	1–7				
2022	Erie	1–9				
2023	Erie	3–7				
2024	Erie	6–4				
2025	Erie	9–1				4
Erie:		20–28				
Total:		20–28				

=== High school ===
Year	Team	Overall	Conference	Standing	Bowl/playoffs
York–Pavilion Golden Knights () (2015)
2015	York–Pavilion	2–6	2–5	6th	
York–Pavilion:		2–6	2–5		
Total:		2–6			
