= Thomas H. Bell =

American football coach, lacrosse coach

Biographical details
- Born: August 2, 1944 (age 82)

Coaching career (HC unless noted)

Football
- 1966–1968: Chicopee HS (MA) (assistant)
- 1971: Dean
- 1972–1975: Plymouth State
- 1976–1982: New Haven
- 1985: Yale (assistant)
- 1986–1992: Coast Guard
- 1993: Springfield Cathedral HS (MA)
- 1994–1997: Macalester
- 2001–2002: Barron G. Collier HS (FL)
- 2004–2007: Hoosac Valley HS (MA)
- 2011–?: Westfield State (OL/TE)

Lacrosse
- 1979–1980: New Haven

Head coaching record
- Overall: 95–102–6 (college football); 4–18 (college lacrosse); 4–3 (junior college football)

Accomplishments and honors

Championships
- 1 NEFC (1979)

Thomas H. Bell (born August 2, 1944) is an American football and lacrosse coach. He served as the head football coach at Plymouth State University (1972–1975), the University of New Haven (1976–1982), the United States Coast Guard Academy (1986–1992), and Macalester College (1994–1997), compiling a career college football record of 95–102–6. Bell was also the head men's lacrosse coach at New Haven from 1979 to 1980, tallying a mark of 4–18.

== Coaching career ==
Bell was the head football coach for the Coast Guard Bears located in New London, Connecticut. He held that position for seven seasons, from 1986 until 1992. His coaching record at Coast Guard was 38 wins and 28 losses. Bell took over mostly losing football programs and was able to transform them into winners. During his career he was able to change the fortunes of Plymouth State University, the University of New Haven and the United States Coast Guard Academy.

== Head coaching record ==
=== College football ===
Year	Team	Overall	Conference	Standing	Bowl/playoffs
Plymouth State Panthers (New England Football Conference) (1972–1975)
1972	Plymouth State	4–2–1	3–1–1	2nd	
1973	Plymouth State	6–2	3–2	2nd	
1974	Plymouth State	7–1–1	5–1–1	2nd	
1975	Plymouth State	6–4	5–3	T–4th	
Plymouth State:		23–9–2	16–7–2		
New Haven Chargers (New England Football Conference) (1976–1980)
1976	New Haven	1–8	1–7	T–8th	
1977	New Haven	3–6	3–5	7th	
1978	New Haven	6–3	5–3	T–3rd	
1979	New Haven	8–0–1	8–0–1	1st	
1980	New Haven	6–3–1	6–2–1	2nd	
New Haven Chargers (NCAA Division II independent) (1981–1982)
1981	New Haven	4–4–2			
1982	New Haven	4–6			
New Haven:		32–30–4	23–17–2		
Coast Guard Bears (NCAA Division III independent) (1986–1991)
1986	Coast Guard	4–5			
1987	Coast Guard	6–2			
1988	Coast Guard	9–1			
1989	Coast Guard	5–4			
1990	Coast Guard	4–5			
1991	Coast Guard	6–3			
Coast Guard Bears (Freedom Football Conference) (1992)
1992	Coast Guard	1–8	1–6	8th	
Coast Guard:		35–28	1–6		
Macalester Scots (Minnesota Intercollegiate Athletic Conference) (1994–1997)
1994	Macalester	0–10	0–9	10th	
1995	Macalester	1–9	0–9	10th	
1996	Macalester	3–7	2–7	T–7th	
1997	Macalester	1–9	0–9	10th	
Macalester:		5–35	2–34		
Total:		95–102–6			
National championship Conference title Conference division title or championship game berth

=== Junior college football ===
Year	Team	Overall	Conference	Standing	Bowl/playoffs
Dean Red Demons (Independent) (1971)
1971	Dean	4–3			
Dean:		4–3			
Total:		4–3			
