= Dan Zaneski =

American football player and coach (1945–2015)

Biographical details
- Born: September 21, 1945; New London, Connecticut, U.S.
- Died: October 14, 2015 (aged 70); Madison, Connecticut, U.S.

Playing career
- 1964–1967: Central Connecticut

Coaching career (HC unless noted)
- 1968: Fitch HS (CT) (assistant)
- 1969–1971: Bristol St. Paul HS (CT)
- 1972–1974: Mattatuck CC (CT)
- 1978–1979: Plymouth State
- 1980: Maryville

Head coaching record
- Overall: 11–18 (college)

Dan Zaneski (September 21, 1945 – October 14, 2015) was an American football coach. He served as the head football coach at Plymouth State University in Plymouth, Massachusetts from 1978 to 1979 and Maryville College in Maryville, Tennessee in 1980, compiling a career college football coaching record of 11–18.

== Head coaching record ==
=== College ===
Year	Team	Overall	Conference	Standing	Bowl/playoffs
Plymouth State Panthers (New England Football Conference) (1978–1979)
1978	Plymouth State	3–6	2–6	8th	
1979	Plymouth State	4–6	4–5	T–5th	
Plymouth State:		7–12	6–11		
Maryville Scots (Old Dominion Athletic Conference) (1980)
1980	Maryville	4–6	3–2	T–2nd	
Maryville:		4–6	3–2		
Total:		11–18			
