= List of Cerritos College alumni =

Cerritos College is a public community college in Norwalk, California. Following is a list of some of its notable alumni.

== Art and literature ==
- Eric Draper – personal photographer for US President George W. Bush
- John Saul – horror author

== Entertainment ==
- John Corbett – actor
- Bobby McFerrin – musician
- Rodney Allen Rippy – actor
- Han Ye-seul – South Korean actress
- Steve Seungjun Yoo – Korean-American singer

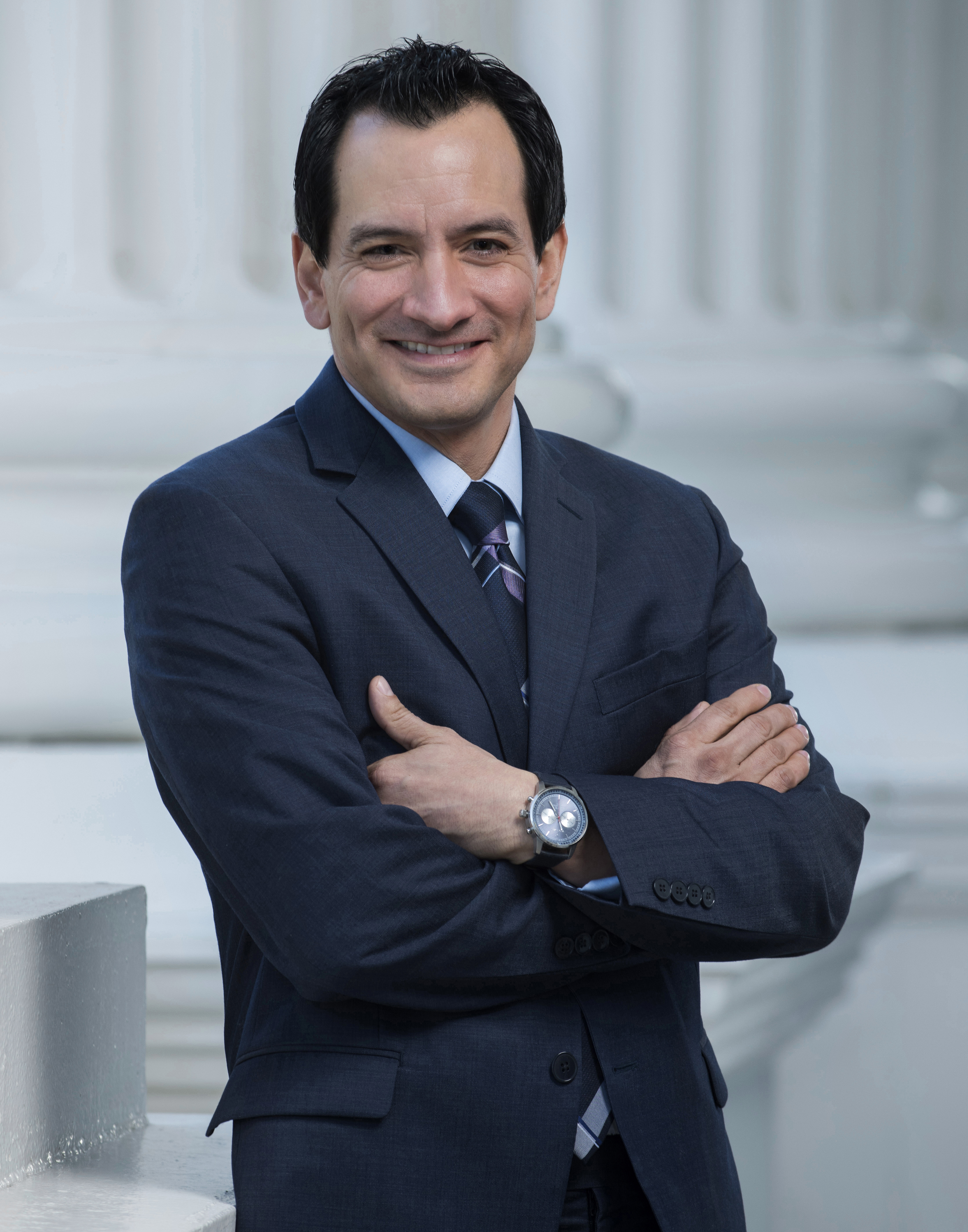
Anthony Rendon 70th speaker of the California State Assembly

== Politics ==
- Grace Napolitano – U.S. representative
- Art Olivier – mayor of Bellflower, California
- Anthony Rendon – 70th speaker of the California State Assembly

== Sports ==
=== Baseball ===
- Bob Apodaca – retired Colorado Rockies pitching coach
- Rod Barajas – Los Angeles Dodgers catcher / San Diego Padres Quality Control Coach
- Bret Barberie – Major League Baseball player
- Mike Benjamin – Major League Baseball infielder
- George Horton – University of Oregon former baseball coach
- Brian Hunter – Major League Baseball former infielder
- Bobby Magallanes – Atlanta Braves assistant hitting coach
- Louie Medina – Major League Baseball
- Tom Nieto – Major League Baseball former catcher, coach
- Bubby Rossman – major league baseball pitcher for the Philadelphia Phillies
- Dusty Wathan – third base coach for the Philadelphia Phillies
- Craig Worthington – former Major League Baseball third baseman

=== Basketball ===
- Lorenzo Romar – former Washington Huskies head basketball coach
- Tom Tolbert – radio sports talk host and former NBA player

=== Football ===
- Corey Bojorquez – Cleveland Browns punter
- Rich Camarillo – former New England Patriots player
- John Farris – former San Diego Chargers player
- Fou Fonoti – former American football player
- Joe Gibbs – former Washington Redskins head coach
- T. J. Houshmandzadeh – former Cincinnati Bengals wide receiver
- Kirk Jellerson – college football coach
- Bobby Lane – former American football player
- Kareem Larrimore – former Dallas Cowboys cornerback
- Steve Mooshagian – American football player and college football coach, National Football League coach
- Tupe Peko – National Football League former player
- Elijhaa Penny – National Football League player
- D. J. Reed – New York Jets defensive back
- Rhamondre Stevenson – New England Patriots running back
- Jeff Tedford – Fresno State Bulldogs head football coach (graduated from California State University, Fresno State)
- Broderick Thompson – former National Football League player
- Demetrin Veal – Tennessee Titans former defensive tackle
- Jim Vellone – former Minnesota Vikings guard
- Herb Welch – former New York Giants player
- Ray Wersching – former San Francisco 49ers kicker
- Ron Yary – former Minnesota Vikings offensive tackle, member of Pro Football Hall of Fame
- Jim Zorn – former Seattle Seahawks quarterback and Washington Redskins head coach

=== MMA ===
- Emanuel Newton (attended) – professional mixed martial artist
- Damacio Page – state champion wrestler; current mixed martial artist, formerly for the WEC and the UFC
- Bao Quach – wrestler, professional MMA fighter
- A.J. McKee – former Bellator MMA featherweight champion

=== Other ===
- Marcelo Balboa – US National soccer team captain
- John Force – NHRA funny car driver
- Houston McTear – former world record sprinter
