= UMass football =

UMass football may refer to:

- UMass Minutemen football of the University of Massachusetts Amherst
- UMass Boston Beacons football of the University of Massachusetts Boston
- UMass Dartmouth Corsairs football of the University of Massachusetts Dartmouth
- UMass Lowell River Hawks football of the University of Massachusetts Lowell
- Boston State Warriors football of Boston State College, which eventually merged with the University of Massachusetts Boston after the football team was disbanded
