= Walter Murphy (disambiguation) =

Walter Murphy (born 1952) is an American composer and pianist.

Walter Murphy may also refer to:

- Walter Murphy (baseball) (1907–1976) Major League Baseball pitcher
- Walter F. Murphy (1929–2010), American political scientist and writer
- Walter L. Murphy (1937–2025), American football coach and judge
- Pete Murphy (Walter Murphy, 1872–1946), American football player and state legislator
- Walter Murphy (politician), state legislator who served as Speaker of the North Carolina House of Representatives
- Walter M. Murphy Company, an automobile coachbuilder
