= Jim Aguiar =

American football and wrestling coach (1946–2015)

Biographical details
- Born: December 30, 1946; Biddeford, Maine, U.S.
- Died: August 3, 2015 (aged 68)

Playing career

Football
- 1966: Boston University

Coaching career (HC unless noted)

Football
- 1974–1979: Plymouth State (DC)
- 1980: Plymouth State

Wrestling
- 1974–1985: Plymouth State
- 1986–1988: Moorhead State (MN)

Head coaching record
- Overall: 6–3–1 (football); 109–90–1 (wrestling duals)

James Aguiar (December 10, 1946 – August 13, 2015) was an American football and wrestling coach. He served as the head football coach at Plymouth State University in 1980, compiling a record of 6–3–1.

== Head coaching record ==
=== Football ===
Year	Team	Overall	Conference	Standing	Bowl/playoffs
Plymouth State Panthers (New England Football Conference) (1980)
1980	Plymouth State	6–3–1	5–3–1	T–4th	
Plymouth State:		6–3–1	5–3–1		
Total:		6–3–1			
