= Chris Rorke =

American football player and coach

Current position
- Title: Head coach
- Team: Tabor Academy (MA)

Playing career
- 1987–1988: Dartmouth
- Position: Quarterback

Coaching career (HC unless noted)
- 1989–1990: Georgia Tech (GA)
- 1991–1993: Dartmouth (WR/TE)
- 1994–1998: Illinois Wesleyan (OC)
- 1999–2002: Plymouth State
- 2003–2005: Lehigh (OC)
- 2006–2010: Trinity (CT) (OC)
- 2011–2016: Dartmouth (QB)
- 2017–2022: Tabor Academy (MA)

Head coaching record
- Overall: 20–21 (college)
- Bowls: 1–0

Accomplishments and honors

Championships
- 1 FFC (2001)

Chris Rorke is an American football coach and former player. He most recently served as the head football coach at Tabor Academy in Marion, Massachusetts. Rorke was the head football coach at Plymouth State University in Plymouth, New Hampshire from 1999 to 2002, compiling a record of 20–21. He played quarterback at Dartmouth College, where he lettered in 1987 and 1988.

== Head coaching record ==
=== College ===
Year	Team	Overall	Conference	Standing	Bowl/playoffs
Plymouth State Panthers (Freedom Football Conference) (1999–2002)
1999	Plymouth State	8–3	4–2	T–2nd	
2000	Plymouth State	5–5	3–3	T–3rd	
2001	Plymouth State	7–3	5–1	T–1st	W ECAC Northeast Championship
2002	Plymouth State	0–10	0–6	7th	
Plymouth State:		20–21	12–12		
Total:		20–21			
National championship Conference title Conference division title or championship game berth
