= Gus Giardi =

American football coach (born c. 1941–1942)

Biographical details
- Born: c. 1942 or 1943 (age 83–84)

Playing career
- 1960–1963: Syracuse
- 1964–1967: Nashua Colts
- Position: Halfback

Coaching career (HC unless noted)
- 1968–?: Bishop Brady HS (NH) (assistant)
- ?–1971: Norwood HS (MA)
- 1972–1978: Central Catholic HS (MA)
- 1979–1993: Braintree HS (MA)
- 1994–1997: UMass Boston

Head coaching record
- Overall: 7–29 (college); 92–114–6 (high school)

Augustin A. Giardi (born c. 1941 or 1942) is an American former football coach. He was head coach for the UMass Boston Beacons football team from 1994 to 1997. He previously coached for Bishop Brady High School, Norwood High School, Central Catholic High School, and Braintree High School. He played college football for Syracuse and semi-professionally for the Nashua Colts as a halfback.

== Head coaching record ==
=== College ===
Year	Team	Overall	Conference	Standing	Bowl/playoffs
UMass Boston Beacons (New England Football Conference) (1994–1997)
1994	UMass Boston	0–9	0–8	9th	
1995	UMass Boston	2–7	1–7	T–8th	
1996	UMass Boston	2–7	2–6	7th	
1997	UMass Boston	3–6	3–5	T–6th	
UMass Boston:		7–29	6–26		
Total:		7–29			
