= Kirk Jellerson =

American football player and coach

Playing career
- 1980–1981: Cerritos
- 1982–1983: Weber State

Coaching career (HC unless noted)
- 1983–1988: Cerritos (assistant)
- 1989–1992: Fullerton (assistant)
- 1993: Whittier (assistant)
- 1994–1996: Chapman (DC)
- 1999: Plymouth State (assistant)
- 2000–2002: Kean (assistant)
- 2004–2007: Utica (DC)
- 2007: Utica (interim HC)
- 2008: Western Washington (DB)
- 2009–2010: Whittier (DC)
- 2011: Whittier

Head coaching record
- Overall: 3–9

Kirk Jellerson is an American former college football player and coach. He served as the interim head football coach at Utica College in 2007 and as the head football coach at Whittier College in 2011.

== Playing career ==
After graduating from St. Paul High School in Santa Fe Springs, California, where he was a member of California state runner-up team in 1978, he went on to play football at Cerritos College and Weber State University. He earned a bachelor's degree from California State University, Long Beach in 1988.

== Coaching career ==
Jellerson began his coaching career at Cerritos College, where he was the linebackers coach from 1983 to 1988. While at Cerritos, they won the South Coast Championship in 1986 and played in three bowl games. He then moved on to Fullerton College, where he was an assistant from 1989 to 1992. After one season as an assistant coach at Whittier College in 1993, he went to Chapman University, where he was an assistant from 1994 top 1996. During his time at Chapman, the Panthers went 26–4–1. Jellerson was the defensive coordinator at Plymouth State University in 1999 and at Kean University from 2000 to 2002. From 2004 from 2006, Jellerson served as the assistant head coach at Utica College and then moved on to Western Washington University from in 2008. In 2008, Western Washington won the Rotary Bowl championship before they ended the program. In 2009 and 2010, Jellerson was the defensive coordinator at Whittier. On November 18, 2010, he was named the interim head coach at Whittier on a permanent basis. On February 21, 2011, he was named the head coach at Whittier. He was removed of his head coaching duties after the 2011 season.

== Head coaching record ==
Year	Team	Overall	Conference	Standing	Bowl/playoffs
Utica Pioneers (Empire 8) (2007)
2007	Utica	1–2	1–2	6th	
Utica:		1–2	1–2		
Whittier Poets (Southern California Intercollegiate Athletic Conference) (2011)
2011	Whittier	2–7	1–5	6th	
Whittier:		2–7	1–5		
Total:		3–9			
