= Kevin Bradley (American football) =

American football coach

Biographical details
- Born: c. 1961 (age 64–65); Methuen, Massachusetts
- Education: Plymouth State College (1983)

Playing career

Football
- 1979–1982: Plymouth State

Basketball
- 1979–1982: Plymouth State
- Position: Quarterback (football)

Coaching career (HC unless noted)

Football
- ?: Norwich (assistant)
- ?: Virginia Tech (assistant)
- ?: Villanova (assistant)
- 1991: West Virginia Tech
- 2001–after 2015: Whittier Tech HS (MA)

Administrative career (AD unless noted)
- 2001–after 2015: Whittier Tech HS (MA)

Head coaching record
- Overall: 0–10 (college)

Accomplishments and honors

Awards
- Plymouth State Hall of Fame (2015)

Kevin Bradley is an American football coach. He served as the head football coach at West Virginia University Institute of Technology in Montgomery, West Virginia for one season, in 1990, compiling a record of 0–10. He played college football for Plymouth State as a quarterback.
