= Donald Birx =

American physicist and academic administrator

15th President of Plymouth State University
- Incumbent
- Assumed office July 31, 2015
- Preceded by: Sara Jayne Steen

Personal details
- Born: Donald Luther Birx Pennsylvania, U.S.
- Relatives: Deborah Birx (sister)

Academic background
- Education: University of California, Berkeley (BS); Miami University (MS, MBA); University of Dayton (PhD)
- Thesis: The design of a neural network that performs a complex mapping for phase sensitive detection and characterization of eddy current impedance plane data (1990)
- Doctoral advisor: Gary A. Thiele

Academic work
- Discipline: Physics
- Sub-discipline: Engineering physics Artificial intelligence
- Institutions: New Mexico State University; University of Houston System; Penn State Erie, The Behrend College; Plymouth State University

Donald Luther Birx is an American physicist and academic administrator who has been the 15th president of Plymouth State University since 2015. Prior to assuming office on July 31, 2015, Birx was an administrator at Pennsylvania State University, the University of Houston System, and the New Mexico State University.

== Early life and education ==
Birx was born in Pennsylvania, the son of Donald Birx Sr., a mathematician and electrical engineer, and Adele Birx (née Sparks), a nursing instructor. His younger sister, Deborah Birx, is a physician and diplomat. His brother, Daniel "Danny" Birx, died in a plane crash in 2000. Birx earned a Bachelor of Science degree in engineering physics from the University of California, Berkeley, a Master of Science in physics and Master of Business Administration from Miami University, and a PhD in electrical engineering and artificial intelligence from the University of Dayton.

== Career ==
Birx began his career at Systems Research Laboratories, Inc., where he was a senior research scientist, principal investigator, and general manager of the intelligent systems division. He then relocated to Las Cruces, New Mexico, where he became a professor of physics and interim vice president for research at New Mexico State University. Birx later worked as the vice chancellor and vice president for research of University of Houston System. Prior to his tenure at Plymouth State University, Birx was the chancellor of Penn State Erie, The Behrend College.

In May 2015 trustees of the University System of New Hampshire announced that Birx had been selected to serve as the 15th president of Plymouth State University, succeeding Sara Jayne Steen. He assumed office on July 31, 2015.

In October 2025, after the departure of Keene State President Melinda Treadwell, the University System of New Hampshire Board of Trustees appointed Birx as interim president of Keene State College. Birx is serving concurrently as president of both institutions through June 30, 2026. During this period, day-to-day operations at Keene State are overseen by Provost Kirsti Sandy and Executive Vice President for Finance and Administration Nathalie Houder.
