= Walter L. Murphy =

American jurist (1937–2025)

Chief Justice of the New Hampshire Superior Court
- In office 2000–2003
- Nominated by: Jeanne Shaheen
- Preceded by: Joseph P. Nadeau
- Succeeded by: Robert J. Lynn

Associate Justice of the New Hampshire Superior Court
- In office 1983–2000
- Nominated by: John H. Sununu

Personal details
- Born: December 11, 1937 Boston, Massachusetts, U.S.
- Died: January 29, 2025 (aged 87)
- Party: Democratic
- Spouse: Joan Elizabeth Hjelm (m. 1962)
- Children: 5
- Education: College of the Holy Cross (BS); Boston College (JD)
- Coaching career

Coaching career (HC unless noted)
- 1966–1969: Plymouth HS (NH) (Asst.)
- 1970–1971: Plymouth State

Head coaching record
- Overall: 5–6 (college)

Walter Leonard Murphy (December 11, 1937 – January 29, 2025) was an American jurist who served as a justice on the New Hampshire Superior Court from 1983 to 2003 and was the first football coach at Plymouth State University. In 1985 Murphy ruled in a case between Dartmouth College and their head football coach, Joe Yukica, that resulted in Yukica regaining his job.

== Background ==
Murphy was born on December 11, 1937, to James Walter and Mary P. née Leonard Murphy. He graduated from the College of the Holy Cross in 1959 and Boston College Law School in 1962. He was a member of the varsity track team at Holy Cross. On July 14, 1962, he married Joan Elizabeth Hjelm. They had five children. Murphy died on January 29, 2025, at the age of 87.

== Coaching ==
From 1966 to 1969, Murphy was an assistant football coach at Plymouth High School in Plymouth, New Hampshire. In 1970, he became the first football coach at Plymouth State University. On the first play in school history, Alan Wool returned the opening kickoff 95 yards for a touchdown on a double-reverse kickoff return play that Murphy had the team practice the night before its first game. The Panthers finished the inaugural season with an 0–3 record, including a loss to Acadia University in a game played under a combination of Canadian and American football rules. The following year, Plymouth State finished 5–3, giving the school its first winning season.

== Legal career ==
Murphy was admitted to the New Hampshire bar in 1962 and began his legal career as an associate of William F. Batchelder. In 1963 he became a partner of the firm, which was known as Batchelder & Murphy until Batchelder's appointment to the New Hampshire Superior Court in 1970. He then practiced with Ross V. Deachman from 1970 to 1975. From 1975 to 1977, Murphy was the clerk of the Grafton County Superior Court. He was then a partner of Murphy & Foley with Robert J. Foley until his appointment to the bench in 1983.

Murphy also served as a member of the Plymouth school committee from 1968 to 1978 and was the town moderator from 1978 to 1983.

== Judicial career ==
In December 1983, Murphy was appointed an associate justice on the New Hampshire Superior Court. He served as supervisory judge of the Hillsborough Superior Court and was a member of the superior court executive committee. He was also an adjunct professor at the Franklin Pierce School of Law and a faculty advisor to the National Judicial College. In October 2000 he was appointed chief justice of the New Hampshire Superior Court by Governor Jeanne Shaheen. He retired from the bench in 2003.

=== Yukica v. Leland ===
Dartmouth head football coach Joe Yukica was asked by athletic director Ted Leland to resign after a 2–7–1 1985 season. He refused and on November 29, 1985, Yukica was removed as head coach and reassigned to another position in the athletic department for the remainder of his contract, which was to expire on June 30, 1987. Yukica, represented by attorney Michael Slive, filed suit seeking to have his dismissal declared illegal and be allowed to complete his contract. Dartmouth, represented by Thomas D. Rath, contended that the school had the right to change the terms of Yukica's contract as long it fulfilled the financial terms. During the trial, fellow coaches Joe Paterno, Jack Bicknell, and Bob Blackman testified on Yukica's behalf. On December 13, 1985, Murphy ruled in favor of Yukica. Dartmouth had the right to appeal, but the two sides reached an out-of-court settlement that allowed Yukica to coach the 1986 season, after which he would leave the school.

Although the case was not resolved at trial, Yukica v. Leland has been hailed by the American Football Coaches Association and others as setting an important precedent in sports law. The case also affected how coaching contracts were written, particularly at the college level.

== Commission to study the death penalty ==
In 2009, Murphy was appointed by Governor John Lynch as chairman of the Commission to Study the Death Penalty in New Hampshire, which had been dormant since the execution of Howard Long in 1939 until the conviction of Michael K. Addison in 2008 for the 2006 murder of Michael Briggs, an on-duty police officer. Murphy was a prominent supporter of the repeal of the death penalty.

== Head coaching record ==
=== College ===
Year	Team	Overall	Conference	Standing	Bowl/playoffs
Plymouth State Panthers (NCAA College Division independent) (1970)
1970	Plymouth State	0–3			
Plymouth State Panthers (New England Football Conference) (1971)
1971	Plymouth State	5–3			
Plymouth State:		5–6			
Total:		5–6			
