= 1981 NCAA Division III football season =

American college football season

- Regular season: August – November 1981
- Playoffs: November – December 1981
- National championship: Garrett-Harrison Stadium; Phenix City, AL
- Champion: Widener

The 1981 NCAA Division III football season, part of college football in the United States organized by the National Collegiate Athletic Association at the Division III level, began in August 1981, and concluded with the NCAA Division III Football Championship in December 1981 at Garrett-Harrison Stadium in Phenix City, Alabama. The Widener Pioneers won their second Division III championship, defeating the defending national champion Dayton by a final score of 17−10.

== Conference changes and new programs ==
- Western New England College joined Division III this year after competing for 11 years as a club team. Buffalo State also abandoned club status to join Division III this year.
- West Georgia revived their football program after last fielding a team in 1958.
- This was the first year that Mercyhurst fielded a football team, just 12 years after the school started admitting male students. They joined Division III as an independent.

School	1980 Conference	1981 Conference
Buffalo State	Club Team	D-III Independent
Iona	MIC	D-III independent
Mercyhurst	New program	Independent (D-III)
New Haven	NEFC	D-II Independent
Saint Mary's	D-III Independent	D-II Independent
West Georgia	Revived Program	D-III Independent
Western New England	Club Team	NEFC

== Conference standings ==
1981 College Athletic Conference football standings
	Conf.					Overall
Team	W		L		T	W		L		T
Rose–Hulman $	5	–	0	–	0	6	–	2	–	1
Illinois College	4	–	1	–	0	7	–	2	–	0
Sewanee	3	–	2	–	0	5	–	4	–	0
Centre	2	–	3	–	0	4	–	5	–	0
Southwestern (TN)	1	–	4	–	0	3	–	5	–	1
Principia	0	–	5	–	0	1	–	8	–	0
$ – Conference champion

1981 College Conference of Illinois and Wisconsin football standings
	Conf.					Overall
Team	W		L		T	W		L		T
Augustana (IL) $^	8	–	0	–	0	9	–	1	–	0
Elmhurst	7	–	1	–	0	7	–	2	–	0
Carthage	6	–	2	–	0	7	–	2	–	0
Millikin	3	–	5	–	0	4	–	5	–	0
Carroll (WI)	3	–	5	–	0	3	–	6	–	0
Illinois Wesleyan	3	–	5	–	0	3	–	6	–	0
North Central (IL)	3	–	5	–	0	3	–	6	–	0
North Park	2	–	6	–	0	2	–	7	–	0
Wheaton (IL)	1	–	7	–	0	2	–	7	–	0
$ – Conference champion; ^ – NCAA Division III playoff participant

1981 Independent College Athletic Conference football standings
	Conf.					Overall
Team	W		L		T	W		L		T
Alfred $^	3	–	0	–	0	10	–	1	–	0
Ithaca	2	–	1	–	0	6	–	4	–	0
St. Lawrence	2	–	2	–	0	5	–	4	–	0
RPI	1	–	1	–	0	3	–	6	–	0
Hobart	0	–	4	–	0	1	–	8	–	0
$ – Conference champion; ^ – NCAA Division III playoff participant

1981 Iowa Conference football standings
	Conf.					Overall
Team	W		L		T	W		L		T
Central (IA) $	6	–	1	–	0	6	–	2	–	1
Buena Vista	5	–	2	–	0	7	–	2	–	0
Wartburg	6	–	2	–	0	6	–	3	–	0
Dubuque	4	–	3	–	0	4	–	6	–	0
Luther *	3	–	4	–	0	3	–	6	–	0
Simpson (IA)	2	–	5	–	0	3	–	6	–	0
William Penn	2	–	5	–	0	3	–	7	–	0
Upper Iowa	1	–	6	–	0	1	–	8	–	0
$ – Conference champion; * – forfeited one non-conference game

1981 Metropolitan Intercollegiate Conference football standings
	Conf.					Overall
Team	W		L		T	W		L		T
St. John's $	4	–	0	–	0	8	–	2	–	0
Pace	3	–	1	–	0	5	–	5	–	0
Brooklyn	2	–	2	–	0	4	–	6	–	0
Marist	1	–	3	–	0	2	–	7	–	0
Saint Peter's	0	–	4	–	0	1	–	8	–	0
$ – Conference champion

1981 Michigan Intercollegiate Athletic Association football standings
	Conf.					Overall
Team	W		L		T	W		L		T
Hope $	5	–	0	–	0	6	–	3	–	0
Adrian	4	–	1	–	0	8	–	1	–	0
Albion	2	–	2	–	1	4	–	4	–	1
Kalamazoo	2	–	3	–	0	3	–	6	–	0
Alma	1	–	4	–	0	2	–	7	–	0
Olivet	0	–	4	–	1	3	–	5	–	1
$ – Conference champion

1981 Middle Atlantic Conference football standings
	Conf.					Overall
Team	W		L		T	W		L		T
Northern Division
Delaware Valley x	6	–	1	–	0	9	–	2	–	0
Juniata x	6	–	1	–	0	6	–	2	–	1
Albright	4	–	2	–	1	5	–	3	–	1
Lycoming	4	–	2	–	1	5	–	4	–	1
Susquehanna	4	–	3	–	0	6	–	3	–	0
Upsala	2	–	5	–	0	4	–	6	–	0
Fairleigh Dickinson–Florham	1	–	6	–	0	1	–	8	–	0
Wilkes	0	–	7	–	0	0	–	9	–	0
Southern Division
Widener x^	8	–	0	–	0	13	–	0	–	0
Johns Hopkins	6	–	2	–	0	7	–	2	–	0
Swarthmore	6	–	2	–	0	7	–	2	–	0
Franklin & Marshall	5	–	3	–	0	6	–	3	–	0
Gettysburg	5	–	3	–	0	6	–	4	–	0
Western Maryland	5	–	3	–	0	5	–	3	–	1
Lebanon Valley	4	–	4	–	0	4	–	5	–	0
Muhlenberg	3	–	5	–	0	3	–	5	–	0
Ursinus	1	–	6	–	1	2	–	6	–	1
Moravian	0	–	7	–	1	2	–	8	–	1
Dickinson	0	–	8	–	0	0	–	9	–	0
x – Division champion/co-champions; ^ – NCAA Division III playoff participant

1981 Midwest Conference football standings
	Conf.					Overall
Team	W		L		T	W		L		T
Lawrence $^	8	–	0	–	0	10	–	1	–	0
Carleton	6	–	2	–	0	7	–	2	–	0
Coe	6	–	2	–	0	7	–	2	–	0
Ripon	6	–	2	–	0	7	–	2	–	0
Cornell (IA)	5	–	3	–	0	6	–	3	–	0
Beloit	3	–	5	–	0	4	–	5	–	0
Lake Forest	3	–	5	–	0	3	–	5	–	0
Chicago	2	–	6	–	0	2	–	6	–	1
Grinnell	2	–	6	–	0	2	–	6	–	0
Knox	2	–	6	–	0	2	–	7	–	0
Monmouth (IL)	1	–	7	–	0	1	–	8	–	0
$ – Conference champion; ^ – NCAA Division III playoff participant

1981 Minnesota Intercollegiate Athletic Conference football standings
	Conf.					Overall
Team	W		L		T	W		L		T
No. 1 Concordia–Moorhead $^	8	–	0	–	0	11	–	0	–	2
No. 15 Saint John's (MN)	6	–	2	–	0	7	–	2	–	0
No. 19 St. Thomas (MN)	6	–	2	–	0	7	–	2	–	0
Gustavus Adolphus	5	–	3	–	0	6	–	4	–	0
Augsburg	3	–	5	–	0	4	–	6	–	0
Macalester	2	–	6	–	0	4	–	6	–	0
St. Olaf	2	–	6	–	0	4	–	7	–	0
Bethel (MN)	2	–	6	–	0	3	–	7	–	0
Hamline	2	–	6	–	0	3	–	7	–	0
$ – Conference champion; ^ – NAIA Division II playoff participant; Rankings from NAIA Division II poll

1981 New England Football Conference standings
	Conf.					Overall
Team	W		L		T	W		L		T
Plymouth State $	9	–	0	–	0	9	–	1	–	0
Maine Maritime	7	–	2	–	0	7	–	2	–	0
Massachusetts Maritime	6	–	3	–	0	6	–	3	–	0
Western New England	5	–	4	–	0	5	–	4	–	0
Nichols	5	–	4	–	0	5	–	4	–	0
Framingham State	4	–	5	–	0	4	–	5	–	0
Bridgewater State	3	–	6	–	0	3	–	6	–	0
Curry	3	–	6	–	0	3	–	6	–	0
Western Connecticut State	1	–	7	–	0	1	–	8	–	0
Boston State *	1	–	8	–	0	1	–	8	–	0
$ – Conference champion; * – Boston State's game against Norwich counted in the conference standings.

1981 New England Small College Athletic Conference football standings
	Conf.					Overall
Team	W		L		T	W		L		T
Middlebury	5	–	1	–	0	7	–	1	–	0
Tufts	5	–	2	–	1	5	–	2	–	1
Bates	5	–	2	–	0	6	–	2	–	0
Amherst	5	–	3	–	0	5	–	3	–	0
Trinity (CT)	4	–	2	–	0	6	–	2	–	0
Wesleyan	3	–	3	–	1	4	–	3	–	1
Williams	2	–	4	–	0	3	–	5	–	0
Bowdoin	2	–	5	–	0	2	–	6	–	0
Colby	1	–	5	–	0	2	–	6	–	0
Hamilton	0	–	5	–	0	0	–	8	–	0
The NESCAC did not recognize an official conference champion until 2000

1981 New Jersey State Athletic Conference football standings
	Conf.					Overall
Team	W		L		T	W		L		T
Montclair State $^	6	–	0	–	0	10	–	2	–	0
Ramapo	4	–	1	–	1	6	–	2	–	1
Glassboro State	4	–	2	–	0	5	–	5	–	0
Trenton State	3	–	2	–	1	5	–	4	–	1
William Paterson	2	–	4	–	0	4	–	6	–	0
Kean	1	–	5	–	0	3	–	7	–	0
Jersey City State	0	–	6	–	0	2	–	8	–	0
$ – Conference champion; ^ – NCAA Division III playoff participant

1981 Northern Intercollegiate Conference football standings
	Conf.					Overall
Team	W		L		T	W		L		T
No. 1 Moorhead State $*	6	–	0	–	0	10	–	1	–	1
Minnesota Duluth	5	–	1	–	0	9	–	1	–	0
Minnesota Morris ^	4	–	2	–	0	7	–	3	–	1
Southwest State (MN)	3	–	3	–	0	6	–	4	–	0
Northern State	2	–	4	–	0	4	–	6	–	0
Winona State	1	–	5	–	0	1	–	9	–	0
Bemidji State	0	–	6	–	0	0	–	10	–	0
$ – Conference champion; ^ – NCAA Division III playoff participant; * – NAIA Division I playoff participant; Rankings from NAIA Division I poll

1981 Ohio Athletic Conference football standings
	Conf.					Overall
Team	W		L		T	W		L		T
Blue Division
Wittenberg xy$	6	–	0	–	0	8	–	2	–	0
Capital	4	–	2	–	0	6	–	3	–	0
Ohio Northern	4	–	2	–	0	6	–	3	–	0
Wooster	3	–	3	–	0	4	–	5	–	0
Ohio Wesleyan	2	–	4	–	0	4	–	5	–	0
Denison	1	–	5	–	0	3	–	6	–	0
Muskingum	1	–	5	–	0	3	–	6	–	0
Red Division
Baldwin–Wallace xy	5	–	0	–	0	8	–	2	–	0
Otterbein	3	–	2	–	0	7	–	2	–	0
Mount Union	3	–	2	–	0	5	–	4	–	0
Kenyon	2	–	3	–	0	5	–	4	–	0
Heidelberg	2	–	3	–	0	2	–	7	–	0
Marietta	0	–	5	–	0	0	–	9	–	0
Not competing for championship
Oberlin			–			3	–	6	–	0
Championship: Wittenberg 10, Baldwin–Wallace 7
$ – Conference champion; x – Division champion/co-champions; y – Championship game participant

1981 Old Dominion Athletic Conference football standings
	Conf.					Overall
Team	W		L		T	W		L		T
Washington and Lee $	4	–	1	–	0	8	–	2	–	0
Maryville (TN)	4	–	1	–	0	5	–	4	–	1
Randolph–Macon	3	–	1	–	1	5	–	3	–	1
Hampden–Sydney	2	–	2	–	1	2	–	7	–	1
Bridgewater	0	–	4	–	1	2	–	6	–	1
Emory & Henry	0	–	4	–	1	1	–	8	–	1
$ – Conference champion; Washington and Lee won the conference title by virtue of their win over Maryville.

1981 Presidents' Athletic Conference football standings
	Conf.					Overall
Team	W		L		T	W		L		T
Carnegie Mellon $	6	–	0	–	1	7	–	1	–	1
Bethany (WV)	5	–	2	–	0	7	–	2	–	0
Hiram	5	–	2	–	0	6	–	3	–	0
Thiel	4	–	2	–	1	4	–	4	–	1
Allegheny	3	–	4	–	0	3	–	5	–	0
John Carroll	3	–	4	–	0	3	–	6	–	0
Washington & Jefferson	1	–	6	–	0	2	–	7	–	0
Case Western Reserve	0	–	7	–	0	0	–	9	–	0
$ – Conference champion

1981 Southern California Intercollegiate Athletic Conference football standings
	Conf.					Overall
Team	W		L		T	W		L		T
Whittier $	5	–	0	–	0	6	–	4	–	0
Claremont-Mudd	4	–	1	–	0	4	–	5	–	0
Redlands	3	–	2	–	0	5	–	5	–	0
Occidental	1	–	4	–	0	3	–	7	–	0
La Verne	1	–	4	–	0	2	–	7	–	0
Pomona-Pitzer	1	–	4	–	0	1	–	8	–	0
$ – Conference champion

1981 Southern Intercollegiate Athletic Conference football standings
	Conf.					Overall
Team	W		L		T	W		L		T
Division II
Morris Brown *	6	–	1	–	0	6	–	4	–	0
Alabama A&M x	2	–	1	–	0	7	–	3	–	0
Fort Valley State	5	–	2	–	0	9	–	2	–	0
Tuskegee	5	–	2	–	0	7	–	4	–	0
Savannah State	4	–	4	–	0	4	–	6	–	0
Morehouse	3	–	6	–	0	3	–	7	–	0
Albany State	0	–	7	–	0	0	–	10	–	0
Division III
Knoxville x	4	–	1	–	0	6	–	2	–	0
Clark	3	–	3	–	0	3	–	6	–	0
Miles	2	–	3	–	1	2	–	7	–	1
Lane	2	–	3	–	1	2	–	7	–	1
Fisk	0	–	6	–	0	0	–	9	–	0
x – Division champion/co-champions; * – Morris Brown was stripped of their division title for using ineligible players. Alabama A&M is recognized as the Division II champion by the SIAC.

1981 Wisconsin State University Conference football standings
	Conf.					Overall
Team	W		L		T	W		L		T
No. 9 Wisconsin–Eau Claire $	8	–	0	–	0	9	–	1	–	0
Wisconsin–Whitewater	5	–	3	–	0	7	–	3	–	0
Wisconsin–Stout	5	–	3	–	0	7	–	4	–	0
Wisconsin–La Crosse	4	–	4	–	0	6	–	4	–	0
Wisconsin–Platteville	4	–	4	–	0	6	–	4	–	0
Wisconsin–Stevens Point	4	–	4	–	0	5	–	5	–	0
Wisconsin–Oshkosh	3	–	5	–	0	5	–	5	–	0
Wisconsin–River Falls	3	–	5	–	0	5	–	5	–	0
Wisconsin–Superior	0	–	8	–	0	0	–	11	–	0
$ – Conference champion; Rankings from NAIA Division I poll

1981 NCAA Division III independents football records
	Conf.			Overall
Team	W	L	T	W		L		T
DePauw		–		9	–	1	–	0
San Diego		–		9	–	1	–	0
Wagner		–		9	–	1	–	0
West Georgia ^		–		9	–	1	–	0
Dayton ^		–		12	–	2	–	0
Wabash		–		8	–	1	–	0
Illinois College		–		7	–	2	–	0
Millsaps		–		7	–	2	–	0
WPI		–		6	–	2	–	0
Albany		–		7	–	3	–	0
Georgetown		–		5	–	3	–	0
Cortland		–		6	–	4	–	0
Bishop		–		6	–	5	–	0
Brockport		–		5	–	5	–	0
Buffalo		–		5	–	5	–	0
Buffalo State		–		3	–	3	–	0
Fordham		–		5	–	5	–	0
Iona		–		5	–	5	–	0
Mercyhurst		–		4	–	2	–	1
Rochester (NY)		–		4	–	4	–	1
Union (NY)		–		4	–	4	–	1
Colorado College		–		4	–	5	–	0
Duquesne		–		4	–	5	–	0
Frostburg State		–		4	–	5	–	0
Lowell		–		4	–	5	–	0
Canisius		–		4	–	6	–	0
Hofstra		–		4	–	6	–	0
UCF		–		4	–	6	–	0
Saint Francis (PA)		–		3	–	6	–	1
Norwich		–		3	–	7	–	0
Grove City		–		2	–	7	–	0
Salisbury State		–		2	–	7	–	0
St. Norbert		–		2	–	7	–	0
Washington (MO)		–		2	–	7	–	0
Catholic University		–		1	–	8	–	0
Merchant Marine		–		1	–	9	–	0
^ – NCAA Division III playoff participant

== Conference champions ==
Conference champions
- College Athletic Conference – Rose-Hulman
- College Conference of Illinois and Wisconsin – Augustana (IL)
- Independent College Athletic Conference – Alfred
- Iowa Intercollegiate Athletic Conference – Central (IA)
- Michigan Intercollegiate Athletic Association – Hope
- Middle Atlantic Conference – Delaware Valley and Juniata (North), Widener (South)
- Midwest Collegiate Athletic Conference – Lawrence
- Minnesota Intercollegiate Athletic Conference – Concordia–Moorhead
- New England Football Conference – Plymouth State
- New Jersey State Athletic Conference – Montclair State
- Northwest Conference – Pacific Lutheran
- Ohio Athletic Conference – Baldwin Wallace (Red Division), Wittenberg (Blue Division)
- Old Dominion Athletic Conference – Washington & Lee
- Presidents' Athletic Conference – Carnegie Mellon
- Southern California Intercollegiate Athletic Conference – Whittier
- Texas Intercollegiate Athletic Association – Austin and Sul Ross
- Twin Rivers Conference – Concordia–St. Paul and Northwestern–St. Paul
- Wisconsin Intercollegiate Athletic Conference – Wisconsin–Eau Claire

== Postseason ==
The 1981 NCAA Division III Football Championship playoffs were the ninth annual single-elimination tournament to determine the national champion of men's NCAA Division III college football. The championship game was held at Garrett-Harrison Stadium in Phenix City, Alabama for the ninth consecutive year. Like the previous six championships, eight teams competed in this edition.

=== Playoff bracket ===
Quarterfinals; Campus Sites
Dayton	19
Augustana (IL)	7
Lawrence	21*
Minnesota–Morris	14
Montclair State	13
Alfred	12
Widener	10
West Georgia	3

Semifinals; Campus Sites
Dayton	38
Lawrence	0
Montclair State	12
Widener	23

National Championship Game; Garrett-Harrison Stadium; Phenix City, AL
Dayton	10
Widener	17

== See also ==
- 1981 NCAA Division I-A football season
- 1981 NCAA Division I-AA football season
- 1981 NCAA Division II football season
- 1981 NAIA Division I football season
- 1981 NAIA Division II football season
