= Jack Storms =

American glass sculptor and entrepreneur (born 1970)

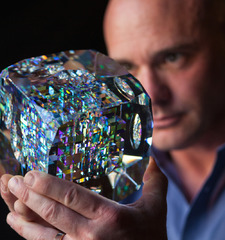
Glass sculptor Jack Storms

Jack Storms (born September 25, 1970) is an American glass sculptor and entrepreneur. He uses cold glass (fabricated glass) sculpting process to create his works. His glass Spectrum Cube and Tear Drop sculptures were used in the Marvel film Guardians of the Galaxy.

== Career ==
Born in Exeter, New Hampshire, Storms attended Plymouth State College where he earned a degree in art, studio emphasis, with a minor in art history. Storms was introduced to glass by a local glass sculptor, Toland Sand. Sand mentored and taught Storms all of the processes and techniques used in Storms’ glass work. Storms started his own studio in 2002 in Carmel Valley, California. In 2004, he opened StormsWorks Studio. He used a cold glass lathe, where he was able to turn glass like one would turn wood enabling him to make shapes like eggs, wine bottles and baseball bats using the cold glass process, which otherwise would be impossible. The glass artist moved his studio to Valencia, California in 2013, where he expanded his operation and opened Storms Publishing.

Storms specializes in both geometric and representational glass sculptures. Some of his work can be figurative as well as abstract. Storms works with three different types of glass: optical crystal, lead crystal, and dichroic glass. He cuts and stacks slivers of dichroic glass and glues them with a two part epoxy to achieve a "floating core look," he then layers optic or crystal glass around the first structure, then hand sculpts it into a specific shape. It can take more than ten weeks to produce one piece. He uses the Fibonacci theory at the core of every one of his designs.

In 2011, the Harrington Art Partnership commissioned Storms to create a large glass bell for public display at the Firehouse Arts Center in Pleasanton, California. The five hundred pound, two-foot tall Firehouse Crystal Bell is an allusion to the art gallery's history as the city's first fire station and it was created in part to honor past firefighters. The bell is composed of over eight thousand pieces of glass and features the use of Starphire glass in addition to the other three glasses that Storms works with. Storms spent approximately two years on the optic bell.

In 2012, Douglas Biro commissioned Storms to create a work of art that commemorates Derek Jeter's 3000th hit. The Optic Crystal Baseball Bat was designed from three thousand pieces of glass. The Carmel Valley Rotary Club commissioned Storms to create a sculpture as a gift to President of Nigeria Olusegun Obasanjo to mark the opening of the first blood bank in Africa.
