= UMass Boston Beacons football =

College football team

- First season: 1988
- Last season: 2000
- Head coach: Paul Castonia; 3rd season, 1–29 (.033)
- Stadium: Clark Athletic Center (capacity: 3,000)
- Location: Boston, Massachusetts
- NCAA division: Division III
- Conference: NEFC
- All-time record: 28–91 (.235)
- Colors: Blue and light blue
- Mascot: Beacons

The UMass Boston Beacons football team represented the University of Massachusetts Boston in college football at the NCAA Division III level. The Beacons were members of the New England Football Conference (NEFC), having fielded its team in the NEFC from 1988 to 2000. The Beacons played their home games at the Clark Athletic Center in Boston, Massachusetts.

Their last head coach was Paul Castonia, who took over the position from 1998 to 2000.

== Conference affiliations ==
- New England Football Conference (1988–2000)

== List of head coaches ==
=== Key ===
Key to symbols in coaches list
General		Overall		Conference		Postseason (Note: Although the first Rose Bowl Game was played in 1902, it has been continuously played since the 1916 game, and is recognized as the oldest bowl game by the NCAA. "—" indicates any season prior to 1916 when postseason games were not played.)	
No.	Order of coaches (Note: A running total of the number of head coaches, with coaches who served separate tenures being counted only once. Interim head coaches are represented with "Int" and are not counted in the running total. "—" indicates the team played but either without a coach or no coach is on record. "X" indicates an interim year without play.)	GC	Games coached	CW	Conference wins	PW	Postseason wins
DC	Division championships	OW	Overall wins	CL	Conference losses	PL	Postseason losses
CC	Conference championships	OL	Overall losses	CT	Conference ties	PT	Postseason ties
NC	National championships	OT	Overall ties (Note: Overtime rules in college football were introduced in 1996, making ties impossible in the period since.)	C%	Conference winning percentage		
†	Elected to the College Football Hall of Fame	O%	Overall winning percentage (Note: When computing the win–loss percentage, a tie counts as half a win and half a loss.)				

=== Coaches ===
List of head football coaches showing season(s) coached, overall records, and conference records
No.	Name	Season(s)	GC	OW	OL	OT	O%	CW	CL	CT	C%
1	Jim Kent	1988–1993	53	19	34	0	0.358	11	26	0	0.297
2	Gus Giardi	1994–1997	36	7	29	0	0.194	6	26	0	0.188
3	Paul Castonia	1998–2000	30	2	28	0	0.067	1	16	0	0.059

== Year-by-year results ==
National champions	Conference champions	Bowl game berth	Playoff berth

Season	Year	Head Coach	Association	Division	Conference	Record						
Season	Year	Head Coach	Association	Division	Conference	Overall			Conference			
Season	Year	Head Coach	Association	Division	Conference	Win	Loss	Tie	Finish	Win	Loss	Tie
UMass Boston Beacons
1988	1988	Jim Kent	NCAA	Division III	NEFC	3	6	0	5th (North)	2	4	0
1989	1989	Jim Kent	NCAA	Division III	NEFC	1	7	1	6th (North)	0	5	0
1990	1990	Jim Kent	NCAA	Division III	NEFC	4	5	0	5th (North)	1	4	0
1991	1991	Jim Kent	NCAA	Division III	NEFC	4	5	0	T–4th (North)	2	3	0
1992	1992	Jim Kent	NCAA	Division III	NEFC	5	4	0	T–5th	4	4	0
1993	1993	Jim Kent	NCAA	Division III	NEFC	2	7	0	8th	2	6	0
1994	1994	Gus Giardi	NCAA	Division III	NEFC	0	9	0	9th	0	8	0
1995	1995	Gus Giardi	NCAA	Division III	NEFC	2	7	0	T–8th	1	7	0
1996	1996	Gus Giardi	NCAA	Division III	NEFC	2	7	0	7th	2	6	0
1997	1997	Gus Giardi	NCAA	Division III	NEFC	3	6	0	T–6th	3	5	0
1998	1998	Paul Castonia	NCAA	Division III	NEFC	0	10	0	7th (Blue)	0	6	0
1999	1999	Paul Castonia	NCAA	Division III	NEFC	1	9	0	6th (Blue)	1	5	0
2000	2000	Paul Castonia	NCAA	Division III	NEFC	1	9	0	7th (Boyd)	0	5	0
