= 1981 Widener Pioneers football team =

American college football season

1981 Widener Pioneers football

NCAA Division III champion MAC Southern Division champion

Stagg Bowl, W 17–10 vs. Dayton
- Conference: Middle Atlantic Conference
- Southern Division
- Record: 13–0 (8–0 MAC)
- Head coach: Bill Manlove (13th season)

1981 Middle Atlantic Conference football standings
	Conf.					Overall
Team	W		L		T	W		L		T
Northern Division
Delaware Valley x	6	–	1	–	0	9	–	2	–	0
Juniata x	6	–	1	–	0	6	–	2	–	1
Albright	4	–	2	–	1	5	–	3	–	1
Lycoming	4	–	2	–	1	5	–	4	–	1
Susquehanna	4	–	3	–	0	6	–	3	–	0
Upsala	2	–	5	–	0	4	–	6	–	0
Fairleigh Dickinson–Florham	1	–	6	–	0	1	–	8	–	0
Wilkes	0	–	7	–	0	0	–	9	–	0
Southern Division
Widener x^	8	–	0	–	0	13	–	0	–	0
Johns Hopkins	6	–	2	–	0	7	–	2	–	0
Swarthmore	6	–	2	–	0	7	–	2	–	0
Franklin & Marshall	5	–	3	–	0	6	–	3	–	0
Gettysburg	5	–	3	–	0	6	–	4	–	0
Western Maryland	5	–	3	–	0	5	–	3	–	1
Lebanon Valley	4	–	4	–	0	4	–	5	–	0
Muhlenberg	3	–	5	–	0	3	–	5	–	0
Ursinus	1	–	6	–	1	2	–	6	–	1
Moravian	0	–	7	–	1	2	–	8	–	1
Dickinson	0	–	8	–	0	0	–	9	–	0
x – Division champion/co-champions; ^ – NCAA Division III playoff participant

The 1981 Widener Pioneers football team represented Widener University as a member of the Middle Atlantic Conference (MAC) during the 1981 NCAA Division III football season. In their 13th season under head coach Bill Manlove, the Pride compiled a 13–0 record and won the NCAA Division III championship.

The team played its home games in Chester, Pennsylvania.

== Schedule ==
Date	Opponent	Site	Result	Attendance	Source
September 12	Delaware Valley*	Chester, PA	W 21–6	2,500	
September 19	at Juniata*	Huntingdon, PA	W 37–13	2,500	
September 26	Johns Hopkins	Chester, PA	W 26–13	3,000	
October 3	at Muhlenberg	Allentown, PA	W 17–3	2,000	
October 10	Gettysburg	Chester, PA	W 38–19	4,500	
October 17	Dickinson	Chester, PA	W 31–0	3,000	
October 24	at Moravian	Bethlehem, PA	W 23–0	2,000	
October 31	at Franklin & Marshall	Lancaster, PA	W 17–7	6,000	
November 7	Ursinus	Chester, PA	W 43–14	3,000	
November 14	at Swarthmore	Swarthmore, PA	W 16–6	9,000	
November 21	at West Georgia*	Grisham Stadium; Carrollton, GA (NCAA Division III quarterfinal)	W 10–3		
November 28	Montclair State*	Chester, PA (NCAA Division III semifinal)	W 23–12		
December 5	vs. Dayton*	Phenix City, AL (Stagg Bowl—NCAA Division III championship game)	W 17–10	6,000	
*Non-conference game
