= Charlie Currier =

American football coach (1928–1982)

Biographical details
- Born: May 6, 1928; Ashland, New Hampshire, U.S.
- Died: November 29, 1982 (aged 54); Plymouth, New Hampshire, U.S.

Coaching career (HC unless noted)
- 1968–1971: Plymouth State (OL)
- 1972–1975: Plymouth State (OC)
- 1976–1977: Plymouth State
- 1978–1982: Plymouth State (OC/OL)

Head coaching record
- Overall: 7–10–1

Charles Lester "Muggsy" Currier (April 6, 1928 – November 29, 1982) was an American college football coach. He was the head football coach for Plymouth State College from 1976 to 1977. He also was a long-time assistant for Plymouth State, dating back to the team's inception in 1970.

Plymouth State's football field is named in his honor following his death in 1982.

== Head coaching record ==
Year	Team	Overall	Conference	Standing	Bowl/playoffs
Plymouth State Panthers (New England Football Conference) (1976–1977)
1976	Plymouth State	5–4	5–3	T–2nd	
1977	Plymouth State	2–6–1	1–6–1	9th	
Plymouth State:		7–10–1	6–9–1		
Total:		7–10–1			
