= Holley Central School District =

School district in New York, United States

Address
- 3800 North Main Street Holley, New York, 14470; United States

District information
- Type: Public
- Grades: PreK–12
- NCES District ID: 3614610

Students and staff
- Students: 981 (2020–2021)
- Teachers: 88.0 (on an FTE basis)
- Staff: 115.1 (on an FTE basis)
- Student–teacher ratio: 11.15:1

Other information
- Website: www.holleycsd.org

Holley Central School District has a pre-K-12 student population of 1,047. Children attend school on a single, central campus in Holley, New York. Middle school and high school students share one building (grades 7-12) and the district office shares a building with the single elementary school (PreK-grade 6).

HCSD is the central site of activities for the community. As such, the community has supported extensive renovations and upgrades of district facilities over the past decade, including construction of a transportation facility and an all-weather track and stadium facility in 2014. A new capital improvement project was approved in 2022. It is estimated to begin in spring 2024 and last through fall of 2025 with lots of highly anticipated updates. It will prioritize safety by building new secure entrances at the Elementary School and Middle/High School. There will be a new science, technology, engineering and mathematics classroom (STEM) built at the ES and the chorus and band rooms in both buildings will be renovated. Changes to look forward to for athletics include new bleachers, scoreboard, lights and a new parking lot at The Woodlands soccer field, and the track will be resurfaced in Hawk Stadium.

== Board of education ==
The current board of education members are:

Anne Winkley, President Term Ends: 2025

Trina Lorentz, Vice President Term Ends: 2026

Joseph Flanagan Term Ends: 2027

Stephanie Merkley Term Ends: 2025

Jennifer Reisman Term Ends: 2027

Jessica Sniatecki Term Ends: 2025

Tracy Van Ameron Term Ends: 2025

== Schools ==
- Holley Elementary School, Principal - Tim Artessa
- Holley Junior-Senior High School, Principal - Matt Feldman
