= Plymouth State Panthers football =

College football team

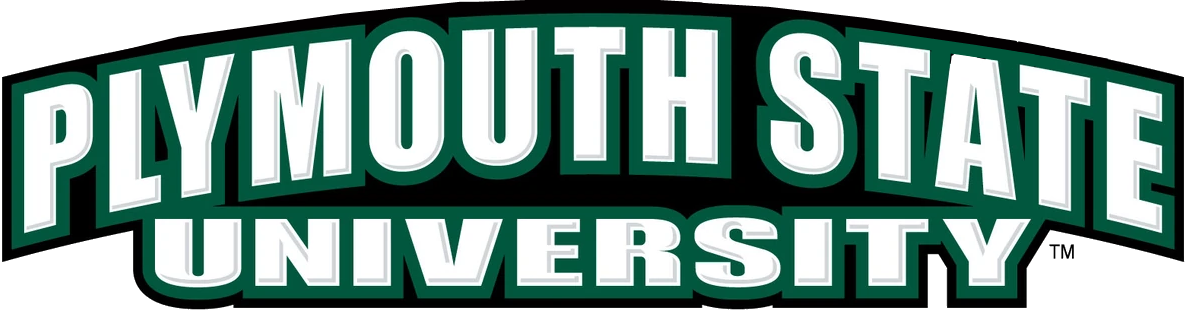
- First season: 1970; 56 years ago
- Athletic director: Kim Bownes
- Head coach: Paul Castonia; Devin Zeman (Note: Zeman has served as co-head coach since 2020. He will be in his fifth year with a record of 23–17.); 22nd season, 111–111 (.500)
- Stadium: Panther Field (capacity: 1,200)
- Location: Plymouth, New Hampshire
- NCAA division: Division III
- Conference: MASCAC
- All-time record: 312–206–7 (.601)
- Bowl record: 5–8 (.385)

Conference championships
- 14
- Rivalries: UMass Dartmouth
- Colors: Green and white
- Mascot: Panther
- Website: athletics.plymouth.edu/football

The Plymouth State Panthers football team represents Plymouth State University in college football at the NCAA Division III level. The Panthers are members of the Massachusetts State Collegiate Athletic Conference, fielding its team in the Massachusetts State Collegiate Athletic Conference since 2013. The Panthers play their home games at Panther Field in Plymouth, New Hampshire.

Their co-head coaches are Paul Castonia, who took over the position in 2003, and Devin Zeman who took over the position in 2020.

== Championships ==
=== Conference championships ===
Plymouth State claims 14 conference titles, the most recent of which came in 2017.

Year	Conference		Overall record	Conf. record	Coach
1981	New England Football	9–1	9–0	Jay Cottone	
1982	New England Football	10–0	9–0	Jay Cottone	
1983†	New England Football	9–2	8–1	Jay Cottone	
1984	New England Football	10–1	9–0	Jay Cottone	
1985†	New England Football	8–3	8–1	Jay Cottone	
1986	New England Football	9–2–1	8–0–1	Lou Desloges	
1987	New England Football	10–1	5–0	Lou Desloges	
1988	New England Football	10–1	6–0	Lou Desloges	
1990	New England Football	9–2	5–0	Lou Desloges	
1994†	Freedom Football	10–1	6–0	Don Brown	
1995	Freedom Football	9–1	7–0	Don Brown	
2001†	Freedom Football	7–3	5–1	Chris Rorke	
2008	New England Football	10–2	7–0	Paul Castonia	
2017†	Massachusetts State	9–2	7–1	Paul Castonia	

† Co-champions

=== Division championships ===
Plymouth State claims 3 division titles, the most recent of which came in 1990.

Year	Division	Coach	Overall Record	Conf. record	Opponent	CG result
1987	NEFC North	Lou Desloges	10–1	5–0	Worcester State	W 40–0
1988	NEFC North	Lou Desloges	10–1	6–0	Worcester State	W 62–0
1990	NEFC North	Lou Desloges	9–1	5–0	Bridgewater State	W 26–7

† Co-champions

== Playoffs ==
The Panthers have made five appearances in the Division III playoffs. Their combined record is 1–5.

Year	Round	Opponent	Result
1984	First Round	Union (NY)	L 14–26
1994	First Round; Second Round	Merchant Marine; Ithaca	W 19–18; L 7–22
1995	First Round	Union (NY)	L 7–24
2008	First Round	Cortland	L 14–26
2017	First Round	Brockport	L 0–66

== Seasons ==
National champions	Conference champions	Bowl game berth	Playoff berth

Season	Year	Head coach	Association	Division	Conference	Record							Postseason	Final ranking
Season	Year	Head coach	Association	Division	Conference	Overall			Conference				Postseason	Final ranking
Season	Year	Head coach	Association	Division	Conference	Win	Loss	Tie	Finish	Win	Loss	Tie	Postseason	Final ranking
Plymouth State Panthers
1970	1970	Walter L. Murphy	NCAA	—	—	0	3	0					—	—
1971	1971	Walter L. Murphy	NCAA	—	NEFC	5	3	0					—	—
1972	1972	Tom Bell	NCAA	—	NEFC	4	2	1	2nd	3	1	1	—	—
1973	1973	Tom Bell	NCAA	Division III	NEFC	6	2	0	2nd	3	2	0	—	—
1974	1974	Tom Bell	NCAA	Division III	NEFC	7	1	1	2nd	5	1	1	—	—
1975	1975	Tom Bell	NCAA	Division III	NEFC	6	4	0	5th	5	3	0	—	—
1976	1976	Charlie Currier	NCAA	Division III	NEFC	5	4	0	T-2nd	5	3	0	—	—
1977	1977	Charlie Currier	NCAA	Division III	NEFC	2	6	1	9th	1	6	1	—	—
1978	1978	Dan Zaneski	NCAA	Division III	NEFC	3	6	0	8th	2	6	0	—	—
1979	1979	Dan Zaneski	NCAA	Division III	NEFC	4	6	0	T-5th	4	5	0	—	—
1980	1980	Jim Aguiar	NCAA	Division III	NEFC	6	3	1	T-4th	5	3	1	—	—
1981	1981	Jay Cottone	NCAA	Division III	NEFC	9	1	0	1st	9	0	0	Conference Champion	—
1982	1982	Jay Cottone	NCAA	Division III	NEFC	10	0	0	1st	9	0	0	Conference Champion	—
1983	1983	Jay Cottone	NCAA	Division III	NEFC	9	2	0	1st	8	1	0	Won ECAC Championship	—
1984	1984	Jay Cottone	NCAA	Division III	NEFC	10	1	0	1st	9	0	0	Lost First Round 14–26	—
1985	1985	Jay Cottone	NCAA	Division III	NEFC	8	3	0	1st	8	1	0	Lost ECAC Championship	—
1986	1986	Lou Desloges	NCAA	Division III	NEFC	9	1	1	1st	8	0	1	Lost ECAC Championship	—
1987	1987	Lou Desloges	NCAA	Division III	NEFC	10	1	0	1st	5	0	0	Won ECAC Championship	—
1988	1988	Lou Desloges	NCAA	Division III	NEFC	10	1	0	1st	6	0	0	Lost ECAC Championship	—
1989	1989	Lou Desloges	NCAA	Division III	NEFC	7	2	0	2nd	4	1	0	—	—
1990	1990	Lou Desloges	NCAA	Division III	NEFC	9	2	0	1st	5	0	0	Lost ECAC Championship	—
1991	1991	Lou Desloges	NCAA	Division III	NEFC	6	3	1	2nd	3	2	0	Lost ECAC Championship	—
1992	1992	Lou Desloges	NCAA	Division III	FFC	4	4	1	3rd	4	1	1	—	—
1993	1993	Don Brown	NCAA	Division III	FFC	6	4	0	2nd	5	1	0	Lost ECAC Championship	—
1994	1994	Don Brown	NCAA	Division III	FFC	10	1	0	1st	6	0	0	Won 1994 First Round 19–18; Lost Second Round 7–22	—
1995	1995	Don Brown	NCAA	Division III	FFC	9	1	0	1st	7	0	0	Lost 1994 First Round 7–24	—
1996	1996	Mike Kemp	NCAA	Division III	FFC	5	4	0	T-4th	3	3	0	—	—
1997	1997	Mike Kemp	NCAA	Division III	FFC	7	4	0	T-2nd	4	2	0	Lost ECAC Championship	—
1998	1998	Mike Kemp	NCAA	Division III	FFC	7	4	0	3rd	4	2	0	Lost ECAC Championship	—
1999	1999	Chris Rorke	NCAA	Division III	FFC	8	3	0	T-2nd	4	2	0	Won ECAC Championship	—
2000	2000	Chris Rorke	NCAA	Division III	FFC	5	5	0	T-3rd	3	3	0	—	—
2001	2001	Chris Rorke	NCAA	Division III	FFC	7	3	0	T-1st	5	1	0	Conference Champion	—
2002	2002	Chris Rorke	NCAA	Division III	FFC	0	10	0	7th	0	6	0	—	—
2003	2003	Paul Castonia	NCAA	Division III	FFC	0	10	0	7th	0	6	0	—	—
2004	2004	Paul Castonia	NCAA	Division III	—	1	8	0					—	—
2005	2005	Paul Castonia	NCAA	Division III	—	4	6	0					—	—
2006	2006	Paul Castonia	NCAA	Division III	NEFC	4	5	0	T-3rd	4	3		—	—
2007	2007	Paul Castonia	NCAA	Division III	NEFC	9	1	0	2nd	6	1		Won ECAC Championship	—
2008	2008	Paul Castonia	NCAA	Division III	NEFC	10	2	0	1st	7	0		Lost 2008 First Round 14–26	—
2009	2009	Paul Castonia	NCAA	Division III	NEFC	8	3	0	2nd	6	1		Lost ECAC Championship	—
2010	2010	Paul Castonia	NCAA	Division III	NEFC	6	4	0	T-4th	4	3		—	—
2011	2011	Paul Castonia	NCAA	Division III	NEFC	4	6	0	5th	2	5		—	—
2012	2012	Paul Castonia	NCAA	Division III	NEFC	2	8	0	T-6th	1	6		—	—
2013	2013	Paul Castonia	NCAA	Division III	MASCAC	2	8	0	T-8th	1	7		—	—
2014	2014	Paul Castonia	NCAA	Division III	MASCAC	1	9	0	9th	0	8		—	—
2015	2015	Paul Castonia	NCAA	Division III	MASCAC	2	8	0	T-8th	1	7		—	—
2016	2016	Paul Castonia	NCAA	Division III	MASCAC	6	4	0	T-3rd	4	4		—	—
2017	2017	Paul Castonia	NCAA	Division III	MASCAC	9	2	0	T-1st	7	1		Lost 2017 First Round 0–66	—
2018	2018	Paul Castonia	NCAA	Division III	MASCAC	6	4	0	4th	5	3		—	—
2019	2019	Paul Castonia	NCAA	Division III	MASCAC	6	4	0	T-5th	4	4		—	—
Season canceled due to COVID-19
2021	2021	Paul Castonia / Devin Zeman	NCAA	Division III	MASCAC	5	5	0	4th	5	3	0	—	—
2022	2022	Paul Castonia / Devin Zeman	NCAA	Division III	MASCAC	9	2	0	2nd	6	2	0	Won New England Bowl 21–20	—
2023	2023	Paul Castonia / Devin Zeman	NCAA	Division III	MASCAC	4	6	0	5th	4	4	0	—	—
2024	2024	Paul Castonia / Devin Zeman	NCAA	Division III	MASCAC									

== List of head coaches ==
=== Key ===
Key to symbols in coaches list
General		Overall		Conference		Postseason (Note: Although the first Rose Bowl Game was played in 1902, it has been continuously played since the 1916 game, and is recognized as the oldest bowl game by the NCAA. "—" indicates any season prior to 1916 when postseason games were not played.)	
No.	Order of coaches (Note: A running total of the number of head coaches, with coaches who served separate tenures being counted only once. Interim head coaches are represented with "Int" and are not counted in the running total. "—" indicates the team played but either without a coach or no coach is on record. "X" indicates an interim year without play.)	GC	Games coached	CW	Conference wins	PW	Postseason wins
DC	Division championships	OW	Overall wins	CL	Conference losses	PL	Postseason losses
CC	Conference championships	OL	Overall losses	CT	Conference ties	PT	Postseason ties
NC	National championships	OT	Overall ties (Note: Overtime rules in college football were introduced in 1996, making ties impossible in the period since.)	C%	Conference winning percentage		
†	Elected to the College Football Hall of Fame	O%	Overall winning percentage (Note: When computing the win–loss percentage, a tie counts as half a win and half a loss.)				

=== Coaches ===
List of head football coaches showing season(s) coached, overall records, conference records, postseason records, championships and selected awards
No.	Name	Season(s)	GC	OW	OL	OT	O%	CW	CL	CT	C%	PW	PL	PT	DC	CC	NC	Awards
1	Walter Murphy	1970–1971	11	5	6	0	0.455	–	–	–	–	–	–	–	–	–	–	–
2	Tom Bell	1972–1975	34	23	9	2	0.706	–	–	–	–	–	–	–	–	–	–	–
3	Charlie Currier	1976–1977	18	7	10	1	0.417	–	–	–	–	–	–	–	–	–	–	–
4	Dan Zaneski	1978–1979	19	7	12	0	0.368	–	–	–	–	–	–	–	–	–	–	–
5	Jim Aguiar	1980	10	6	3	1	0.650	–	–	–	–	–	–	–	–	–	–	–
6	Jay Cottone	1981–1985	53	46	7	0	0.868	–	–	–	–	1	2	0	–	5	–	–
7	Lou Desloges	1986–1992	73	55	15	3	0.774	–	–	–	–	1	4	0	–	4	–	–
8	Don Brown	1993–1995	31	25	6	0	0.806	–	–	–	–	1	2	0	–	2	–	–
9	Mike Kemp	1996–1998	31	19	12	0	0.613	–	–	–	–	0	2	0	–	–	–	–
10	Chris Rorke	1999–2002	41	20	21	0	0.488	–	–	–	–	1	0	0	–	1	–	–
11	Paul Castonia	2003–present	182	85	97	0	0.467	–	–	–	–	1	4	0	–	2	–	–
12	Devin Zeman	2020–present	33	18	15	0	0.545	–	–	–	–	–	–	–	–	–	–	–
