= Gary Emanuel =

American football coach

Personal information
- Born: October 30, 1958 (age 68); Philadelphia, Pennsylvania, U.S.

Career information
- High school: New London (CT)
- College: Westchester Community College, Plymouth State

Career history
- Plymouth State (1981) Assistant offensive line coach; Plymouth State (1982) Offensive line coach; Plymouth State (1983–1984) Offensive coordinator & offensive line coach; West Chester (1985) Defensive line coach; Massachusetts (1986–1987) Outside linebackers coach; Dartmouth (1988–1990) Defensive line coach; Syracuse (1991–1993) Defensive line coach; Washington State (1994–1996) Defensive line coach; Purdue (1997–1999) Defensive tackles coach; Purdue (2000–2002) Defensive ends coach; Purdue (2003–2004) Assistant head coach & defensive ends coach; San Francisco 49ers (2005–2006) Defensive line coach; San Jose State (2007) Defensive line coach; Rutgers (2008–2009) Defensive line coach; Purdue (2010) Co-defensive coordinator & defensive line coach; Purdue (2011) Defensive coordinator & defensive line coach; Indianapolis Colts (2012–2017) Defensive line coach; New York Giants (2018–2019) Defensive line coach; Atlanta Falcons (2021–2022) Defensive line coach

Gary Emanuel (born October 30, 1958) is an American football coach who served as defensive line coach of the Atlanta Falcons. He was the defensive line coach of the Indianapolis Colts from 2012 to 2017 and the New York Giants from 2018 to 2019.
