= Widener Pride football =

Widener Pride
- First season: 1879; 147 years ago
- Head coach: Mike Barainyak; 6th season, 31–32 (.492)
- Location: Chester, Pennsylvania
- Stadium: Leslie C. Quick Jr. Stadium (capacity: 4,000)
- Field: Elizabeth J. Hirschmann Field
- NCAA division: Division III
- Conference: MAC
- Colors: Blue and gold

NCAA Division III championships
- 1977, 1981
- Mascot: Pride
- Website: widenerpride.com/football

The Widener Pride football team represents Widener University, located in Chester, Pennsylvania, in NCAA Division III college football. Under previous college names and athletics nicknames, the team was also previously known as the Pennsylvania Military Cadets and the Widener Pioneers.

The Pride, who began playing football in 1879, compete as members of the Middle Atlantic Conferences.

Widener's home games are played at Leslie C. Quick Jr. Stadium.

== Championships ==
=== National championships ===
Year	Association	Division	Head coach	Record	Opponent	Result
1977	NCAA (2)	Division III (2)	Bill Manlove	11–1 (6–0 MAC)	Wabash	W, 39–36
1981	NCAA (2)	Division III (2)	Bill Manlove	13–0 (8–0 MAC)	Dayton	W, 17–10
