= Lou Desloges =

American football coach (1947–2021)

Biographical details
- Born: February 22, 1947; Franklin, New Hampshire, U.S.
- Died: September 28, 2021 (aged 74); Plymouth, New Hampshire, U.S.
- Education: Plymouth State University

Playing career
- 1966–1967: Southern Connecticut State
- Position: Offensive lineman

Coaching career (HC unless noted)
- 1976: Plymouth State (assistant)
- 1977: Plymouth Regional HS (NH) (assistant)
- 1978–1985: Plymouth State (DC)
- 1986–1992: Plymouth State
- 1993–?: Bethany (WV) (DC)
- ?–2000: Dartmouth (assistant)
- 2001–2019: Plymouth State (DT)

Head coaching record
- Overall: 55–15–3
- Bowls: 1–4

Accomplishments and honors

Championships
- 4 NEFC (1986–1988, 1990)

Awards
- Plymouth State Athletic Hall of Fame (2018)

Louis Raymond Desloges (February 22, 1947 – September 28, 2021) was an American football coach. He was the head coach for the Plymouth State Panthers football team from 1986 to 1992, compiling a record of 55–15–3. He was also an assistant coach for Plymouth Regional High School, Bethany, and Dartmouth.

== Head coaching record ==
Year	Team	Overall	Conference	Standing	Bowl/playoffs
Plymouth State Panthers (New England Football Conference) (1986–1991)
1986	Plymouth State	9–2–1	8–0–1	1st	L North
1987	Plymouth State	10–1	5–0	1st (North)	W North
1988	Plymouth State	10–1	6–0	1st (North)	L North
1989	Plymouth State	8–2	4–1	2nd (North)	
1990	Plymouth State	9–2	5–0	1st (North)	L North
1991	Plymouth State	6–3–1	3–2	T–2nd (North)	L Northwest
Plymouth State Panthers (Freedom Football Conference) (1992)
1992	Plymouth State	4–4–1	4–1–1	3rd	
Plymouth State:		55–15–3	35–4–2		
Total:		55–15–3			
National championship Conference title Conference division title or championship game berth
