= Joe Dudek =

American football player (born 1964)

No. 32
- Position: Running back

Personal information
- Born: January 22, 1964 (age 62); Boston, Massachusetts, U.S.
- Listed height: 6 ft 0 in (1.83 m)
- Listed weight: 200 lb (91 kg)

Career information
- High school: North Quincy (Quincy, Massachusetts)
- College: Plymouth State (1982–1985)
- NFL draft: 1986: undrafted

Career history
- Denver Broncos (1986–1987); New York Jets (1989)*
- * Offseason or practice squad member only

Career NFL statistics
- Rushing yards: 154
- Rushing average: 4.4
- Touchdowns: 2
- Stats at Pro Football Reference
- College Football Hall of Fame

Joseph Anthony Dudek (born January 22, 1964) is an American former professional football player.

Dudek received national attention when he was featured on the cover of Sports Illustrated's December 2, 1985, issue as the magazine's pick for the Heisman Trophy after he broke Walter Payton's NCAA record for career touchdowns. Dudek finished ninth in the voting, the best result ever for a non-Division I player.

Dudek finished his collegiate career with ten school records. He holds the NCAA record for career 100-yard rushing games (30) and games with two or more touchdowns (24). Plymouth State went 37–6 during his time there, reaching the Eastern College Athletic Conference playoffs twice and earning their first-ever NCAA playoff appearance. Dudek's number 22 was the first to be retired at Plymouth State College.

Dudek played two games for the Denver Broncos in 1987 (during the 1987 NFL players' strike), rushing for 154 yards and two touchdowns.

Dudek was elected to the College Football Hall of Fame in 1997. He lives in Auburn, New Hampshire, with his wife and their two children, working for Southern Wine & Spirits.

His son, Joey, plays ice hockey at Boston College and was selected 152nd overall in the 2014 NHL entry draft by the New Jersey Devils.
