= ECAC Bowl =

Defunct college football bowl game

The ECAC Bowl is a series of college football bowl games organised by the Eastern College Athletic Conference (ECAC) in NCAA Divisions I and III. The D-I series ran from 1993 to 2003, while the D-III games have been held since 1983.

== Division I game ==
ECAC Bowl Games (defunct)
- Eastern College Athletic Conference; Bowl Games
- Location: New York State; Pennsylvania
- Operated: 1983–2003
- Championship affiliation: NEC; MAAC

From 1993 until its cancellation in 2003, the game pitted the champion of the Northeast Conference against the Metro Atlantic Athletic Conference champion. All games were played on campus sites.

All games involved a team from either New York State or Pennsylvania, and only the 1997 game, hosted by Georgetown University, did not take place in either one of those states. At the time, the NEC and MAAC were two of three conferences (the third being the Pioneer Football League) that did not have an automatic bid into the NCAA Division I Football Championship but had not voluntarily abstained from the tournament; the conferences were notable in that they did not offer football scholarships. The Northeast Conference edged the MAAC in all-time results, with NEC members winning six of the ten games.

By 2003, several of the MAAC universities were closing down their football teams, and the ECAC Bowl was likewise shuttered; this contraction eventually led to the conference's dropping of the sport in 2007. From 2006 to 2009, the NEC champion instead participated in the Gridiron Classic against the Pioneer Football League champion. The NEC was awarded an automatic bid to the NCAA tournament in 2010, with the PFL receiving their bid in 2013.

=== Results ===
key

- Title count in (brackets):

Date	Champion	Score	Runner-up	Venue
November 18, 1989	Franklin & Marshall (1)	31–18	St. John's	Jamaica, NY
November 21, 1992	Wagner (1)	48–6	Saint Francis (PA)	Staten Island, NY
November 20, 1993	Wagner (2)	32–0	Iona	New Rochelle, NY
November 19, 1994	St. John's (1)	34–14	Wagner	Jamaica, NY
November 18, 1995	Duquesne (1)	44–20	Wagner	Pittsburgh, PA
November 23, 1996	Robert Morris (1)	28–26	Duquesne	Pittsburgh, PA
November 22, 1997	Robert Morris (2)	35–13	Georgetown	Washington, DC
December 1, 2001	Sacred Heart (1)	31–15	Duquesne	Pittsburgh, PA
November 23, 2002	Albany (1)	23–0	Duquesne	Albany, NY
November 22, 2003	Duquesne (2)	12–10	Monmouth	Pittsburgh, PA

== ECAC Bowl Series (Division III) ==
ECAC Bowl Games
- Eastern College Athletic Conference; Bowl Games
- Stadium: Various in New York State
- Location: New York State; Pennsylvania
- Operated: 1983–present
- Championship affiliation: Various conferences

The ECAC introduced in 1983 two Division III football bowl games: The Metro NY/NJ and the New England bowls. In 1984 they were renamed to North and South, and in 1991 they were expanded to two games per region: Northeast, Northwest, Southeast and Southwest bowls. In 2002 they were expanded to three games per region, with an additional game per region if there were enough qualifying teams: Northeast, Northwest, North Atlantic, Southeast, Southwest, South Atlantic, North Central (2010, 2013, 2014) and South Central (2008).

Format was changed in 2015 so all the teams played at a single site over three days, and names were changed to: Asa S. Bushnell, Clayton Chapman, James Lynah, Legacy, Presidents and Robert M. "Scotty" Whitelaw. The games returned to campus sites in 2018, but with only four played: Asa S. Bushnell, Clayton Chapman, James Lynah and Robert M. "Scotty" Whitelaw. At this point many conferences had decided to sponsor bowls outside the ECAC structure (New England Bowl Series, New York Bowl and Centennial-MAC Bowl Series).

=== Results ===
Year	Bowl	Champion	Runner-up	Score
1983	Metro NY/NJ	Wagner	St. John's (NY)	48–7
1983	New England	Plymouth State	Massachusetts Maritime	35–24
1984	North	Ithaca	Norwich	35–14
1984	South	Merchant Marine	Widener	38–6
1985	North	Albany	Plymouth State	33–21
1985	South	Wagner	Merchant Marine	9–7
1986	North	Alfred	Plymouth State	30–3
1986	South	Wagner	Franklin & Marshall	40–28
1987	North	Plymouth State	Ithaca	13–12
1987	South	Franklin & Marshall	Kean	21–0
1988	North	Coast Guard	Plymouth State	28–19
1988	South	Dickinson	Fordham	21–14
1989	North	Alfred	Bridgewater State	30–27
1989	South	Franklin & Marshall	St. John's (NY)	31–18
1990	North	Union	Plymouth State	33–19
1990	South	Ramapo	Frostburg State	20–14
1991	Northeast	Buffalo State	WPI	23–17
1991	Northwest	Cortland	Plymouth State	21–6
1991	Southeast	Frostburg State	William Paterson	46–16
1991	Southwest	Wesley	Ramapo	35–21
1992	Northeast	RPI	Bridgewater State	28–25
1992	Northwest	Cortland	Bentley	38–20
1992	Southeast	Wagner	St. Francis (PA)	48–6
1992	Southwest	Merchant Marine	Dickinson	20–13 (ot)
1993	Northeast	Maine Maritime	Brockport	28–20
1993	Northwest	RPI	Plymouth State	13–0
1993	Southeast	Wesley	Fairleigh Dickinson–Florham	6–0
1993	Southwest	Montclair State	Dickinson	17–9
1994	Northeast	Cortland	Maine Maritime	15–6
1994	Northwest	Union	UMass Dartmouth	34–14
1994	Southeast	Wilkes	Stony Brook	28–21 (ot)
1994	Southwest	Kean	Frostburg State	41–7
1995	Northeast	Springfield	Cortland	49–26
1995	Northwest	RPI	Worcester State	69–12
1995	Southeast	Trenton State	Wesley	10–7
1995	Southwest	Albright	Salisbury	20–10
1996	Northeast	Ithaca	Worcester State	27–21
1996	Northwest	Union	Salve Regina	26–13
1996	Southeast	Frostburg State	Wilkes	24–21
1996	Southwest	Merchant Marine	Franklin & Marshall	20–0
1997	Northeast	RPI	Worcester State	14–13
1997	Northwest	Buffalo State	Plymouth State	21–17
1997	Southeast	Albright	Wesley	10–0
1997	Southwest	Merchant Marine	Grove City	25–12
1998	Northeast	Salve Regina	Plymouth State	36–6
1998	Northwest	Ithaca	Hartwick	40–6
1998	Southeast	Montclair State	Widener	15–7
1998	Southwest	Dickinson	Wesley	35–28
1999	Northeast	Plymouth State	Salve Regina	13–7
1999	Northwest	Union	Ithaca	31–7
1999	Southeast	Wilkes	Fairleigh Dickinson–Florham	27–6
1999	Southwest	Carnegie Mellon	Frostburg State	28–10
2000	Northeast	Western Connecticut	Nichols	63–10
2000	Northwest	Buffalo State	Hartwick	43–20
2000	Southeast	King's (PA)	Ursinus	45–20
2000	Southwest	Muhlenberg	Wilkes	26–22
2001	Northeast	Worcester State	Curry	36–35
2001	Northwest	Union	Hartwick	38–25
2001	Southeast	King's (PA)	Muhlenberg	32–29
2001	Southwest	Albright	Wesley	49–35
2002	Northeast	RPI	Worcester State	55–29
2002	Northwest	Cortland	Westfield State	30–7
2002	Southeast	McDaniel	Moravian	21–7
2002	Southwest	Johns Hopkins	Frostburg State	24–21
2002	North Atlantic	Hartwick	Curry	69–14
2002	South Atlantic	Wilkes	Merchant Marine	33–7
2003	Northeast	UMass Dartmouth	Worcester State	21–7
2003	Northwest	St. John Fisher	Cortland	47–37
2003	Southeast	Delaware Valley	College of New Jersey	54–37
2003	Southwest	Washington & Jefferson	Wilkes	41–19
2003	North Atlantic	Hobart	Norwich	34–18
2003	South Atlantic	Johns Hopkins	King's (PA)	41–13
2004	Northeast	Alfred	Norwich	36–17
2004	Northwest	Ithaca	UMass Dartmouth	36–19
2004	Southeast	Johns Hopkins	Waynesburg	26–23
2004	Southwest	Franklin and Marshall	Moravian	37–20
2004	North Atlantic	Springfield	Fitchburg State	53–7
2004	South Atlantic	Albright	McDaniel	54–10
2005	Northeast	Bridgewater State	Fitchburg State	34–17
2005	Northwest	RPI	St. John Fisher	26–22
2005	Southeast	Salisbury	Franklin & Marshall	27–23
2005	Southwest	Moravian	Frostburg State	14–7
2005	North Atlantic	Alfred	Maine Maritime	63–20
2005	South Atlantic	Widener	Montclair State	27–18
2006	Northeast	RPI	Cortland	26–7
2006	Northwest	Alfred	Rochester	40–34 (ot)
2006	Southeast	Kean	King's (PA)	37–0
2006	Southwest	Widener	Ursinus	14–7
2006	North Atlantic	Bridgewater State	Coast Guard	41–22
2006	South Atlantic	Salisbury	Delaware Valley	15–9
2007	Northeast	Cortland	Union	23–7
2007	Northwest	Alfred	Rochester	49–14
2007	Southeast	Dickinson	Waynesburg	16–10 (ot)
2007	Southwest	Carnegie Mellon	Gettysburg	21–20
2007	North Atlantic	Plymouth State	Bridgewater State	24–21
2007	South Atlantic	Montclair State	Albright	17–13
2008	Northeast	St. John Fisher	Husson	17–7
2008	Northwest	Brockport	Hartwick	70–68
2008	Southeast	Catholic	Johns Hopkins	18–17
2008	Southwest	Salisbury	Moravian	21–17
2008	North Atlantic	RPI	Alfred	34–31
2008	South Atlantic	Delaware Valley	Kean	16–7
2008	South Central	Albright	Montclair State	42–14
2009	Northeast	Springfield	Plymouth State	42–13
2009	Northwest	St. John Fisher	Cortland	34–20
2009	Southeast	Kean	Ursinus	35–14
2009	Southwest	Lebanon Valley	Salisbury	37–21
2009	North Atlantic	Union	Hartwick	39–21
2009	South Atlantic	Franklin & Marshall	Wilkes	29–24
2010	Northeast	Framingham State	Norwich	27–21 (ot)
2010	Northwest	St. John Fisher	RPI	56–13
2010	Southeast	Moravian	Wilkes	26–14
2010	Southwest	Washington & Jefferson	Franklin & Marshall	54–41
2010	North Atlantic	Springfield	Mount Ida	26–17
2010	South Atlantic	Johns Hopkins	Lebanon Valley	44–14
2010	North Central	Western New England	Maine Maritime	66–41
2011	Northeast	Alfred	Bridgewater State	41–10
2011	Northwest	Salve Regina	Worcester State	26–6
2011	Southeast	Cortland	Albright	14–0
2011	Southwest	Lebanon Valley	Saint Vincent	23–15
2011	North Atlantic	Endicott	Mount Ida	31–22
2011	South Atlantic	Widener	Waynesburg	48–27
2012	Northeast	Springfield	Alfred	31–8
2012	Northwest	St. John Fisher	Castleton State	63–7
2012	Southeast	Albright	Franklin & Marshall	38–34
2012	Southwest	Waynesburg	Carnegie Mellon	28–24
2012	North Atlantic	Endicott	Norwich	34–14
2012	South Atlantic	Delaware Valley	Muhlenberg	24–21
2013	Northeast	Western Connecticut	Salve Regina	48–35
2013	Northwest	Brockport	Waynesburg	19–12
2013	Southeast	Franklin & Marshall	Delaware Valley	38–14
2013	Southwest	Albright	Juniata	45–34
2013	North Atlantic	Springfield	Norwich	28–27
2013	South Atlantic	Salisbury	Muhlenberg	21–19
2013	North Central	Alfred	Cortland	21–14
2014	Northeast	Salve Regina	Norwich	48–21
2014	Northwest	St. John Fisher	Western Connecticut	28–14
2014	Southeast	Stevenson	Bethany	29–7
2014	Southwest	Buffalo State	Waynesburg	59–36
2014	North Atlantic	Framingham State	RPI	42–36 (ot)
2014	South Atlantic	Salisbury	Albright	48–27
2014	North Central	Morrisville	Utica	52–41
2015	Asa S. Bushnell	RPI	Buffalo State	20–13
2015	Clayton Chapman	Salve Regina	Husson	42–39
2015	James Lynah	Westminster	St. John Fisher	42–21
2015	Robert M. "Scotty" Whitelaw	Alfred	Fitchburg State	11–10
2015	Legacy	Carnegie Mellon	Bridgewater State	48–13
2015	Presidents	Kean	WPI	24–6
2016	Asa S. Bushnell	Frostburg State	St. John Fisher	38–14
2016	Clayton Chapman	Kean	Cortland	30–27
2016	James Lynah	Westminster	Utica	33–6
2016	Robert M. "Scotty" Whitelaw	RPI	Maritime College	38–6
2016	Legacy	Salisbury	Carnegie Mellon	52–20
2016	Presidents	Washington & Jefferson	Brockport	38–31
2017	Asa S. Bushnell	Muhlenberg	Carnegie Mellon	32–6
2017	Clayton Chapman	Merchant Marine	Buffalo State	35–20
2017	James Lynah	Alfred	Stevenson	29–16
2017	Robert M. "Scotty" Whitelaw	Ithaca	Salisbury	27–17
2018	Asa S. Bushnell	Alfred	Salisbury	14–7
2018	Clayton Chapman	Wesley	Westminster	42–34
2018	James Lynah	Grove City	Morrisville	56–48
2018	Robert M. "Scotty" Whitelaw	Utica	Ithaca	44–42
2019	Asa S. Bushnell	Washington & Jefferson	Ithaca	20–17
2019	Clayton Chapman	Westminster	Morrisville	35–24
2019	James Lynah	Grove City	RPI	41–38
2019	Robert M. "Scotty" Whitelaw	Brevard	Carnegie Mellon	42–28
2020	2020 bowls canceled due to the COVID-19 pandemic			
2021	Asa S. Bushnell	Hobart	Westminster	21–3
2021	Clayton Chapman	Brockport	Washington & Jefferson	20–7
2021	James Lynah	Fairleigh Dickinson–Florham	Saint Vincent	38–19
2021	Robert M. "Scotty" Whitelaw	Grove City	Utica	49–7
2022	Asa S. Bushnell	Washington & Jefferson	Hobart	35–18
2022	Clayton Chapman	Brockport	Westminster	– (Note: Game cancelled due to extreme weather.)
2022	James Lynah	Grove City	Fairleigh Dickinson–Florham	31–14
2022	Robert M. "Scotty" Whitelaw	RPI	Morrisville	10–6
2023	Asa S. Bushnell	Carnegie Mellon	Brockport	37–7
2023	Clayton Chapman	Utica	Hobart	10–6
2023	James Lynah	Washington & Jefferson	Merchant Marine	39–14
2023	Robert M. "Scotty" Whitelaw	RPI	Widener	49–21
2024	Asa S. Bushnell	Western Connecticut	Alfred	45–14
2024	Clayton Chapman	Brockport	Rochester	42–23
2024	Robert M. "Scotty" Whitelaw	Morrisville	Stevenson	21–18
2025	Asa S. Bushnell	Rowan	Utica	26–20
2025	Clayton Chapman	RPI	St. John Fisher	35–24
2025	James Lynah	Hobart	Maritime College	42–14
2025	Robert M. "Scotty" Whitelaw	Brockport	Geneva	46–10
