= Commonwealth Coast Football =

NCAA Division III football league

- Formerly: New England Football Conference
- Association: NCAA
- Founded: 1965 (Renamed 2017)
- Commissioner: Gregg M. Kaye (since 2015)
- Sports fielded: 1
- Division: Division III
- No. of teams: 7
- Headquarters: Biddeford, Maine
- Region: New England
- Website: www.cccathletics.com/sports/fball/index

Locations
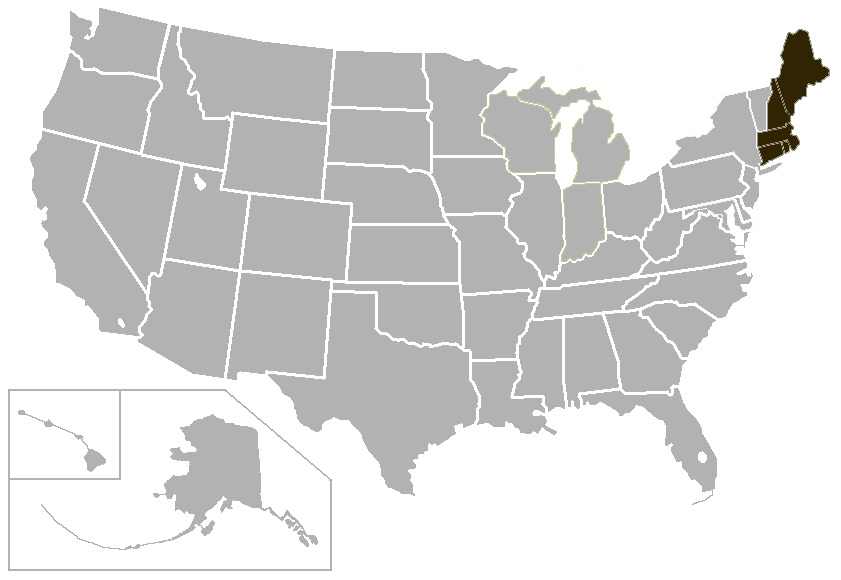

Commonwealth Coast Football (CCC Football) was a single-sport athletic conference that competed in football in the NCAA's Division III. It began play as CCC Football in 2017 after the New England Football Conference (NEFC) was renamed following the 2016 season. CCC Football was administered by the Commonwealth Coast Conference, known since August 2024 as the Conference of New England.

The conference competed under the NEFC banner from 1965 through the 2016 season. Member teams are located in New England.

Before an NEFC conference split that took effect with the 2013 season, the NEFC was divided into the Boyd Division and the Bogan Division, with the division champions competing in Division III football's only season-ending conference championship game.

After the 2012 season, the NEFC split, with the seven Massachusetts state institutions and Plymouth State playing in the MASCAC for football. The conference's automatic bid to the NCAA Division III playoffs continued to be held by the eight remaining members: Curry, Endicott, Maine Maritime, MIT, Nichols, Salve Regina, Coast Guard, and Western New England. In the 12 seasons the NEFC hosted a championship game between its two division winners, these remaining eight members accounted for 16 of the 24 championship game participants and 8 of 12 conference champions.

The decision to rename the NEFC was made in October 2015, as the Commonwealth Coast Conference announced that it would add football by effectively absorbing the NEFC as a single-sport conference known as Commonwealth Coast Football, starting with the 2017–18 school year. Accordingly, the 2016 season was the last for the NEFC under its long-standing name and acronym.

The CCC and Commonwealth Coast Football unveiled a new family of logos during a June 2019 visual rebrand.

Due to changes in NCAA Division III legislation regarding the number of members required for a conference to receive an automatic qualifier (AQ), football was incorporated into the multi-sport Commonwealth Coast Conference in 2022, eliminating the need for the football-only league. As noted above, the multi-sports conference adopted its current name, Conference of New England, in 2024.

== NEFC and CCC Football Membership evolution ==
1965 – The New England Football Conference is founded by charter members Curry, Bridgewater State and Maine Maritime.

1971 – Plymouth State and New England College become conference members.

1972 – Nichols College and Boston State become conference members.

1972 – New England College suspends football program following '72 season; Mass. Maritime Academy becomes conference member.

1973 – Framingham State and New Haven become conference members.

1979 – Western Connecticut State becomes conference member.

1981 – Western New England College becomes conference member.

1981 – New Haven leaves conference, moves to Division II.

1981 – Boston State suspends football program following '81 season.

1982 – Westfield State becomes conference member.

1985 – Fitchburg State and Worcester State become conference members.

1985 – Western Connecticut leaves conference to pursue independent schedule.

1987 – UMass Lowell becomes conference member in 1987, initiating a split into two six-team divisions with divisional winners meeting in championship playoff game.

1988 – UMass Boston and UMass Dartmouth become conference members.

1988 – Western New England leaves conference following '88 season.

1992 – Plymouth State and UMass Lowell join the Freedom Football Conference; Curry and Nichols join the Eastern Collegiate Football Conference.

1992 – The conference now numbers nine colleges that play a round robin schedule.

1997 – Five new members begin conference play in 1998: Curry, Nichols, MIT, Salve Regina and WNEC. The 14-team conference had two 7-team divisions.

1999 – Bridgewater State (10–0) receives first automatic qualification to NCAA playoffs.

2000 – The first Championship game in the 14-team Conference is scheduled. Wal*Mart agrees to sponsor the game. The Divisions are renamed with the Red being the Bogan Division and the Blue becoming the Boyd Division named after the NEFC's first two commissioners. Bridgewater State defeats Salve Regina 27–24 for the championship. UMass Boston drops football.

2001 – The Bogan Division plays with only six teams while the Boyd continues with seven. Endicott College begins a football program and is admitted into the Boyd Division beginning with the 2003 season.

2004 – A Most Valuable Player Award is established for the NEFC Championship Game and is named the William Mottola Award in honor of the long-time conference commissioner.

2005 – Plymouth State University and the United States Coast Guard Academy are admitted as members for play beginning in the 2006 season. Plymouth enters the Boyd Division and Coast Guard Academy competes in the Bogan Division. The Conference decides that the Championship Game will be played at the campus of the Bogan Division winner in even numbered years and on the field of the Boyd Division champion in odd numbered years.

2007 – Curry College becomes the first NEFC team to win an NCAA Division III Championship Tournament game, defeating Hartwick College 42–21.

2008 – The NEFC qualifies two teams for the NCAA Division III Championship Tournament for the first time. Conference champion Plymouth State University receives the automatic bid, and Curry College receives an at-large bid.

2010 – Maine Maritime Academy sets a new NCAA Division III season rushing record with 5189 yards in 11 games. The Mariners miss the all-Division mark set by the University of Oklahoma in 1971 by eight yards.

2011 – Massachusetts State College Athletic Conference institution presidents decide to form a MASCAC football league, which consists of nine schools, and the league champion is awarded an automatic berth to the NCAA D-III Football National Tournament. Bridgewater State University, Fitchburg State University, Framingham State University, Massachusetts Maritime Academy, Westfield State University, and Worcester State University are the six core schools deciding to join the new MASCAC conference. Also, Plymouth State University, UMass-Dartmouth, and Western Connecticut State also join the MASCAC conference as flagship members, effectively in 2013.

2012 – The NEFC qualifies two teams for the NCAA Division III National Tournament for the second time in league history. Framingham State (10–1) won the NEFC Championship and received the automatic bid, while Bridgewater State (9–1) received an at-large bid. Framingham State lost in the first round, 20–19 to Cortland State (NY), while Bridgewater State also lost in the first round, 44–14 to Widener University (PA).

2013 – Retired Bridgewater State University Director of Athletics John Harper is named Commissioner of the Conference

2014 – The Conference Championship traveling trophy is named for former Maine Maritime Academy Director of Athletics and football coach Bill Mottola. Mottola was NEFC Commissioner from 1997 to 2007 and was affiliated with the conference for four decades.

2015 – Maine Maritime Academy, Massachusetts Institute of Technology, and the United States Coast Guard Academy announce plans to leave the NEFC following the 2016 season to compete in the NEWMAC, which begins sponsoring football as a championship sport in 2017.

2015 – Gregg Kaye, Commissioner of the Commonwealth Coast Conference, is named NEFC Commissioner.

2016 – The NEFC completes its final season of play under the NEFC name. Curry, Endicott, Nichols, Salve Regina, and Western New England compete in a renamed NEFC known as Commonwealth Coast Football (CCC Football) in succeeding years. Becker joins as an associate member in 2017 and the University of New England adds a football program and becomes CCC Football's seventh football member in 2018. As a renamed NEFC, CCC Football continues to receive automatic qualification to the NCAA Division III Championship Tournament.

2017 – The NEFC begins play as Commonwealth Coast Football and continues to operate as a single-sport conference administered by the Commonwealth Coast Conference.

2019 – Husson joins as an associate member.

2021 – Becker ceases operations.

2022 - Football fully incorporated into the CCC sport sponsorship, rendering CCC Football a defunct league.

== Member schools ==
=== Current members ===
Institution	Location	Founded	Type	Enrollment	Nickname	Joined	Primary Conference	Colors
Curry College	Milton, Massachusetts	1879	Private	2,410	Colonels	1965; 1998	CNE	
Endicott College	Beverly, Massachusetts	1939	Private	4,528	Gulls	2003	CNE	
Husson University	Bangor, Maine	1898	Private	3,476	Eagles	2019	NAC	
Nichols College	Dudley, Massachusetts	1815	Private	1,518	Bison	1972; 1998	CNE	
Salve Regina University	Newport, Rhode Island	1934	Private/Catholic	2,771	Seahawks	1998	CNE	
University of New England	Biddeford, Maine	1831	Private	7,208	Nor'easters	2018	CNE	
Western New England University	Springfield, Massachusetts	1919	Private	3,702	Golden Bears	1981; 1998	CNE	

=== Former NEFC/CCC Football members ===
The years of departure listed are the calendar years in which each school left the conference. Because football is a fall sport, the year of departure is the calendar year after the last season of competition.

Institution	Location	Founded	Type	Enrollment	Nickname	Joined	Left	Football conference	Primary conference
Becker College	Worcester, Massachusetts	1784	Private	2,189	Hawks	2017	2021	Closed in 2021	
Boston State College	Boston, Massachusetts	1872	Public	11,000	Warriors	1972	1982	Merged into the University of Massachusetts Boston	
Bridgewater State University	Bridgewater, Massachusetts	1840	Public	10,651	Bears	1965	2013	MASCAC	
United States Coast Guard Academy (Coast Guard)	New London, Connecticut	1876	Federal	988	Bears	2006	2017	NEWMAC	
Fitchburg State University	Fitchburg, Massachusetts	1894	Public	4,659	Falcons	1985	2013	MASCAC	
Framingham State University	Framingham, Massachusetts	1839	Public	4,876	Rams	1973	2013	MASCAC	
Maine Maritime Academy	Castine, Maine	1941	Public	937	Mariners	1965	2017	NEWMAC	NAC
University of Massachusetts Boston	South Boston, Massachusetts	1964	Public	16,259	Beacons	1988	2001	no longer sponsors football	Little East (LEC)
University of Massachusetts Dartmouth	Dartmouth, Massachusetts	1895	Public	8,513	Corsairs	1988	2013	MASCAC	Little East (LEC)
University of Massachusetts Lowell	Lowell, Massachusetts	1894	Public	18,338	River Hawks	1988	1992	no longer sponsors football (Note: Although UMass Lowell left the NEFC in 1992, it continued to sponsor the sport through the 2002 season.)	America East (NCAA D-I)
Massachusetts Maritime Academy	Buzzards Bay, Massachusetts	1891	Public	1,637	Buccaneers	1972	2013	MASCAC	
Massachusetts Institute of Technology (MIT)	Cambridge, Massachusetts	1861	Private	4,512 (Note: Undergraduate enrollment; total enrollment is 11,319.)	Engineers	1998	2017	NEWMAC	
New England College	Henniker, New Hampshire	1946	Private	1,460	Pilgrims	1971	1973	no longer sponsors football	NAC
University of New Haven	West Haven, Connecticut	1920	Private	6,000	Chargers	1973	1982	Northeast Conference (NCAA D-I)	
Plymouth State University	Plymouth, New Hampshire	1871	Public	4,491	Panthers	1971; 1989	1991; 2013	MASCAC	Little East (LEC)
Western Connecticut State University	Danbury, Connecticut	1903	Public	5,246	Colonials	1979	1986	MASCAC	Little East (LEC)
Westfield State University	Westfield, Massachusetts	1838	Public	5,400	Owls	1982	2013	MASCAC	
Worcester State University	Worcester, Massachusetts	1874	Public	6,434	Lancers	1985	2013	MASCAC	

Commonwealth Coast Football
Location of the current members

== Primary conferences ==
When the conference operated under the NEFC name, its teams competed in other primary multi-sport conferences.
