= Plymouth State University =

Public university in Plymouth, New Hampshire, US

Coordinates: 43°45′32″N 71°41′21″W

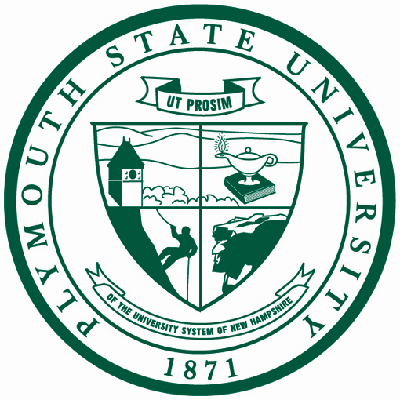
- Former name: List: Plymouth Holmes Academy (1808–1870); Plymouth Normal School (1871–1939); Plymouth Teachers College (1939–1963); Plymouth State College (1963–2003)
- Motto: Ut prosim (That I may serve)
- Type: Public university
- Established: 1871; 155 years ago (as public college)
- Parent institution: University System of New Hampshire
- Academic affiliations: Space-grant
- Endowment: $41.2 million
- President: Donald Birx
- Provost: Nathaniel Bowditch
- Students: 3,707 (2024)
- Undergraduates: 3,182 (2024)
- Postgraduates: 525 (2024)
- Location: Plymouth, New Hampshire, United States
- Campus: 170 acres (69 ha); College town
- Nickname: Panthers
- Sporting affiliations: NCAA Division III – Little East; MASCAC; New England Hockey Conference; EISA
- Mascot: Pemi the Panther
- Website: plymouth.edu
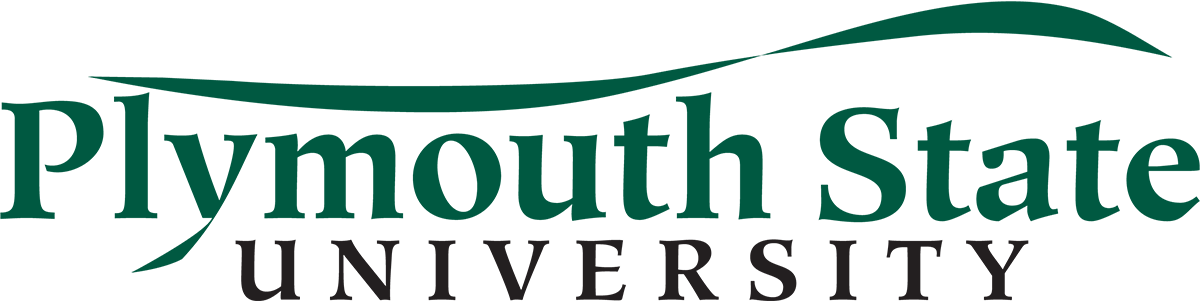

Plymouth State University (PSU) is a public university in Plymouth, New Hampshire, United States. It was founded as Plymouth Normal School in 1871. Since that time, it has evolved to a teachers college, a state college, and finally to a state university in 2003. PSU is part of the University System of New Hampshire.

== History ==
The current Plymouth State University traces its origins to 1808, when the State of New Hampshire established the Holmes Plymouth Academy, a private institution akin to a high school, with some teacher preparation as well. It went through several name changes before closing its doors in 1870. The building and grounds continued to be used for various educational purposes, including as a seminary and high school. On March 15, 1871, the grounds became a public normal school, the Plymouth Normal School. Plymouth Normal School was subsequently renamed Plymouth Teacher's College and later Plymouth State College. In between these name changes in 1948, the school expanded its curriculum to include graduate degrees. The college was renamed as a university by the New Hampshire General Court in 2003, thus adopting its current name, "Plymouth State University".

== Academics ==
Undergraduate demographics as of Fall 2023
Race and ethnicity	Total
White	79%
Two or more races	6%
Hispanic	5%
Unknown	5%
Black	2%
International student	2%
Asian	1%
Economic diversity
Low-income (Note: The percentage of students who received an income-based federal Pell grant intended for low-income students.)	27%
Affluent (Note: The percentage of students who are a part of the American middle class at the bare minimum.)	73%

The university offers both undergraduate and graduate degrees, including BA, BFA, BS, MA, MAT, MBA, MS, and MEd degrees, the Certificate of Advanced Graduate Studies (CAGS), and the Doctor of Education (EdD) in Learning, Leadership, and Community.

Plymouth State is accredited by the New England Commission of Higher Education and approved by the New Hampshire Postsecondary Education Commission. Program-specific accreditations include the Council for the Accreditation of Educator Preparation for teacher education; Commission on Accreditation of Athletic Training Education (CAATE) for athletic training; Accreditation Council for Business Schools and Programs (ACBSP) for undergraduate and graduate degrees; the Council on Social Work Education (CSWE) for social work; the Society of Public Health Education and the American Association of Health Education (SOPHE/AAHE) for health education; and the Council for Accreditation of Counseling and Related Educational Programs (CACREP) for the Master of Education in Counselor Education, including mental health counseling and school counseling concentrations.

The university currently has 19 academic departments. Within each department there are several different study options and degree programs. The most popular majors at Plymouth State are business and education. Other popular majors include physical education, health education, art, social science, psychology, and communication studies. In 2011, Plymouth State University added a BS in nursing degree to its list of available programs of study.

Beginning in fall of 2017, the university switched to a "cluster model" with seven interdisciplinary areas instead of academic departments or colleges. The clusters are:

- Arts and technology
- Education, democracy and social change
- Exploration and discovery
- Health and human enrichment
- Innovation and entrepreneurship
- Justice and security
- Tourism, environment and sustainable development

The cluster approach is designed to encourage collaboration and communication in the application of solving problems and innovating for the digital age. The cluster model is championed by university president Donald Birx who was hired in 2015 after creating cluster models at other colleges and universities at which he previously worked.

== Facilities ==
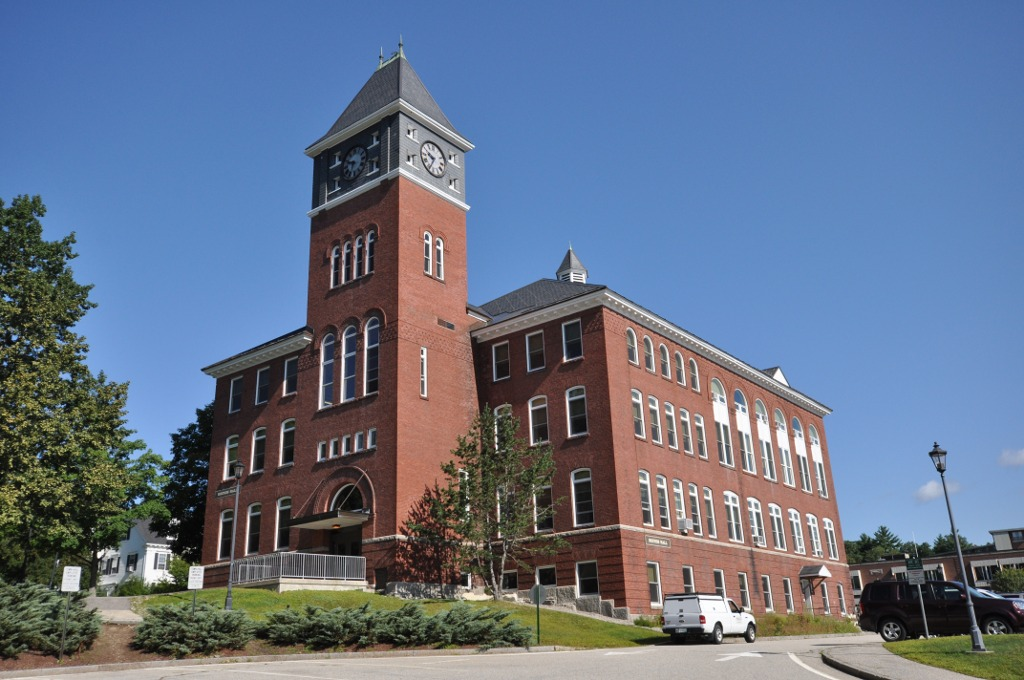
Rounds Hall

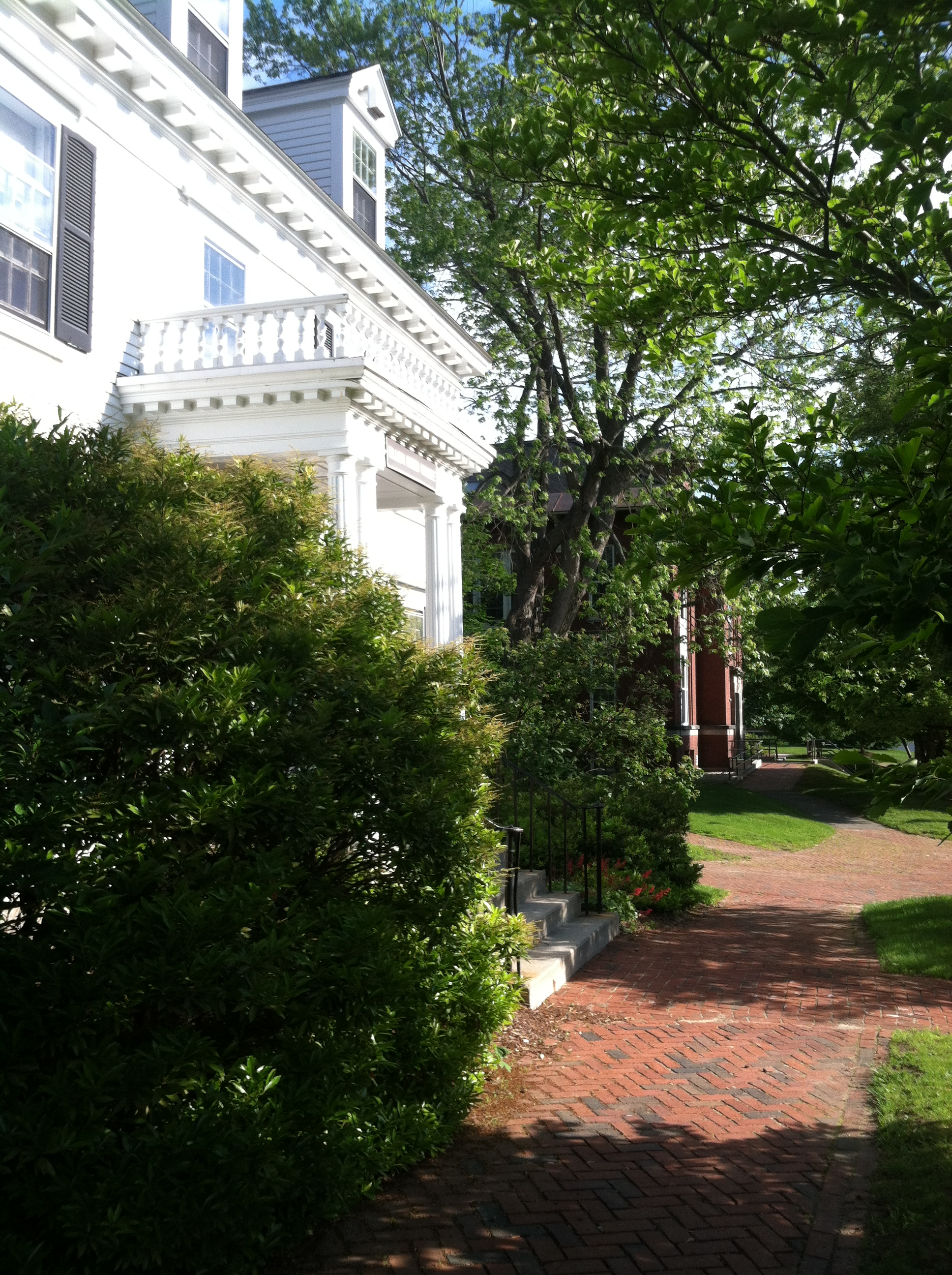
Ellen Reed House

Rounds Hall, with its iconic clock tower, was built in 1890 and named for Principal Charles Collins Rounds, who, as enrollment grew, strongly advocated for construction of a new classroom building. Today, Rounds Hall houses the university's education departments. An annual tradition called Pumpkins on Rounds has been ongoing since 1975.

In spring 1923, Plymouth Normal School opened Samuel Read Hall Dormitory, named after a teacher educator who taught at Holmes Plymouth Academy in the late 1830s. The facility is now focused on human and environmental health.

Built in 1974, Hyde Hall is named for Plymouth State's 10th president, Harold E. Hyde, whose 26-year tenure from 1951 to 1977 was a period of growth for the institution in both number of students and in campus facilities. Today, Hyde Hall is home to academic programs.

Boyd Science Center is the heart of scientific research and study at PSU. The building, named for longtime science professor Robert L. Boyd, is also home to the Mark Sylvestre Planetarium and the Judd Gregg Meteorology Institute, a resource for students in PSU's undergraduate and graduate meteorology degree programs, the only such programs in New Hampshire.

The Enterprise Center at Plymouth (ECP) opened in 2013 as a collaboration between the university and the Grafton County Economic Development Council. The ECP serves as a business incubator and accelerator, assisting start-ups and existing businesses with professional services and resources.

Built in 1916 and renovated in 2006, Mary Lyon Hall is named after Mary Lyon (1797–1849), an American pioneer in women's education. In 2012, Mary Lyon Hall was added to the New Hampshire State Register of Historic Places. Mary Lyon is home to PSU's international programs as well as the Center for Student Success, which offers academic support programs, undergraduate advising, global education resources, and career services.

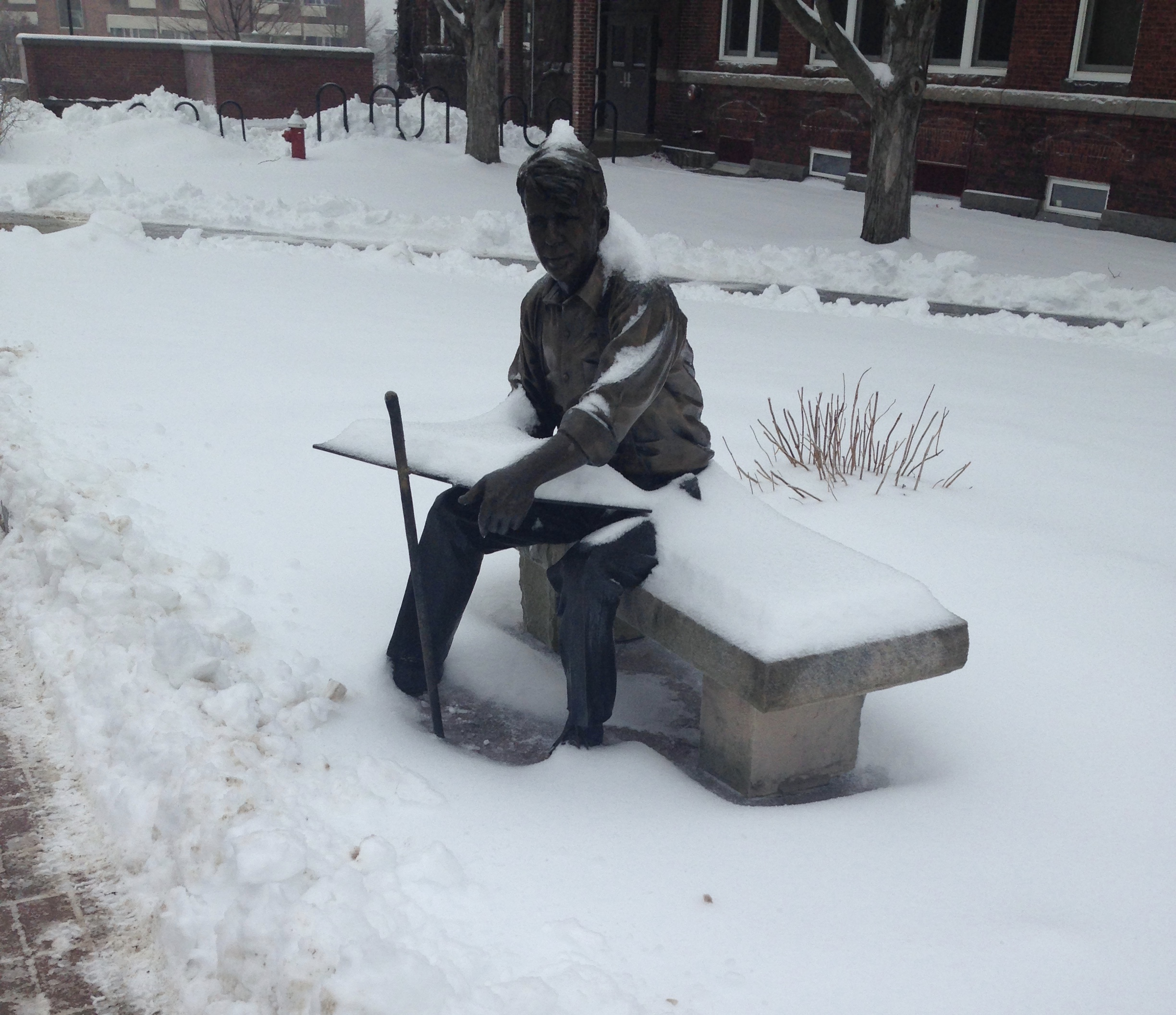
A statue of Robert Frost sits on a bench in front of Rounds Hall.

The center of student life on campus, the HUB, is a multi-function building. The HUB is home to student-run and professional offices. The HUB is also home to the Daily Paws Cafe, the Union Grille, and university offices. A PSU annual tradition called First Fire is held in the HUB Fireplace Lounge each fall and students come out to collect their unique First Fire Mug.

Built in 1956 and named for longtime Plymouth State president Ernest Silver, Silver Hall served as a physical education center, a music and theater teaching and performance facility, and an assembly hall. The Silver Center for the Arts supports PSU students of the performing arts. The Silver Center is also the home of the New Hampshire Music Festival, which performs classical and pops concerts in the Hanaway Theater and chamber music concerts in Smith Recital Hall. The festival begins the week after the July 4th holiday and runs through the middle of August.

In the early twentieth century, the Draper & Maynard Building was home to premier sporting goods manufacturer Draper & Maynard Sporting Goods Company. It is home to PSU's Department of the Arts. The first floor of the building houses the university's MakerSpace. The fourth floor is currently under construction and will soon feature several labs for the university's program in Electromechanic Technology and Robotics (EMTR). Many professional players received their equipment from D&M such as Babe Ruth.

Lamson Library and Learning Commons opened in September 2006. It is the largest publicly accessible library in central/northern New Hampshire and second largest overall after Dartmouth College. Resources include open technology labs, the Spinelli Archives and Special Collections, and the Writing Center.

=== Residential halls and apartment buildings ===
Most first-year students will reside in double or triple rooms in one of the university's traditional residence halls: Belknap, Geneva Smith, Grafton, Mary Lyon, and Pemigewasset. Newly admitted Upper Division students and graduate students are eligible to request housing in the White Mountain Apartments, Langdon Woods, and Merrill Place. Langdon Woods was the first college dormitory building in New Hampshire to receive LEED Gold certification.

- Belknap Hall
- Geneva Smith Hall
- Grafton Hall
- Langdon Woods
- Mary Lyon Hall
- Merrill Place
- Non-Traditional Student Apartments
- Pemigewasset Hall
- White Mountain Apartments

=== Museum of the White Mountains ===
The Museum of the White Mountains showcases artifacts and art from the White Mountains region and supports the university's teaching and research missions. Among the collections acquired by the museum are:

- Archives and images, including rare glass-plate photographs, stereoscopic images, hotel ledgers, postcards and more donated by the late Dan Noel.
- A comprehensive collection early and first edition as well as more recent books and guides about the region from John W. (Jack) and Anne H. Newton.
- White Mountains art by women artists from Frances "Dolly" MacIntyre.
- Images and collectables from the Balsams Grand Resort Hotel from Steve Barba.

== Athletics ==
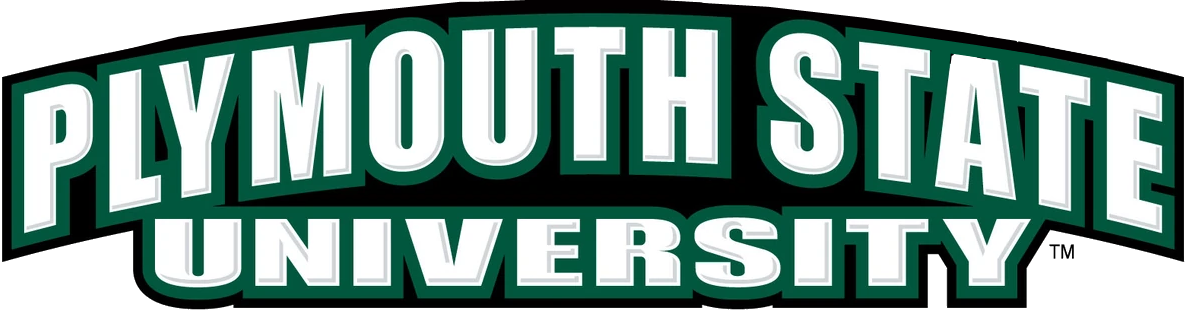
Plymouth State athletics wordmark

Plymouth State University's athletic teams are known as the Panthers. The athletic teams' colors are green and white. PSU competes in NCAA Division III as a member of the Little East Conference (LEC) for most of its intercollegiate sports. They've been successful in men's and women's skiing, ice hockey, football, basketball, and soccer, and women's field hockey, swimming and diving, and volleyball. The school's main rival is Keene State College, which also competes in the LEC. Every year the President's Cup is awarded to the school which has more victories in total sports competitions against each other.

Plymouth State University athletics mostly take place in the Physical Education (PE) Center which was opened in the Spring of 1969. Since that time it has undergone several expansions and renovations, and plans are now being developed to build a new, larger facility.

Plymouth State gained national attention in 1985 when Sports Illustrated featured PSU student and football player Joe Dudek as their favorite to win the Heisman Trophy. Dudek, a running back for the Panthers, earned the attention for breaking Walter Payton's mark for career touchdowns.

== Notable people ==
=== Alumni ===
==== Arts and Media ====
- Ken Barlow (b.1962), television meteorologist
- Paul Reubens (1952-2023), actor known for his character Pee-wee Herman (did not graduate)
- Chris Romano (b. 1978), television producer, co-creator of Blue Mountain State
- Jack Storms (b. 1970), glass sculptor
- Anok Yai (b. 1997), fashion model

==== Politics, government, and law ====
- Ella Knowles Haskell (1860–1911), first woman to argue a case in the U.S. Supreme Court (attended for one year)
- Jeffrey R. Howard (b. 1955), U.S. Courts of Appeals judge (1978)
- Chuck Morse (b. 1960), President of the New Hampshire Senate, Acting Governor
- Raymond S. Burton, longest serving member of the Executive Council of New Hampshire in state history.
- Dennis Ruprecht (b. 1999), member of the New Hampshire House of Representatives from 2018-2021.
- Matthew Wilhelm, Minority Leader of the New Hampshire House of Representatives
- Sanna Ejaz, Pashtun women's rights activist
- Rodney Elliott, former mayor of Lowell, Massachusetts and member of the Massachusetts House of Representatives

==== Sports ====
- Ed Ashnault (b. 1934), collegiate baseball, basketball and football coach (1960)
- Don Brown (b. 1955), Defensive Coordinator, University of Michigan (1996 M.Ed.)
- Joe Dudek (b. 1964), All-American collegiate football player, Heisman trophy finalist & former Denver Broncos player
- Matt Tupman (b. 1979), Major League Baseball player for the Kansas City Royals (freshman only)
- Freydís Halla Einarsdóttir, Olympic athlete
- Elene Gedevanishvili, Olympic athlete

=== Faculty ===
- Donald Birx, American physicist and university administrator, 15th president of Plymouth State University.
- Karl Drerup (1904–2000), professor of fine arts from 1948 to 1968; namesake of university's art gallery
- Robert Frost (1874–1963), American poet; taught at Plymouth Normal School in 1911
- Joseph Monninger (1953-2025), professor of English and writer of fiction and non-fiction
- Walter L. Murphy, judge and first-ever Plymouth state football coach
