= Centennial Conference football =

Annual American football competition

Centennial Conference football is an annual American football competition of the Centennial Conference competing in NCAA Division III.

== History ==
On June 4, 1981, the Centennial Conference was founded as a football-only league, then known as the Centennial Football Conference. Charter members included Dickinson College, Franklin & Marshall College, Gettysburg College, Johns Hopkins University, Muhlenberg College, Swarthmore College, Ursinus College, and Western Maryland College (now McDaniel College).

== Standings by year ==
1983 Centennial Conference football standings
	Conf.					Overall
Team	W		L		T	W		L		T
Gettysburg +	5	–	2	–	0	8	–	2	–	0
Swarthmore +	5	–	2	–	0	7	–	2	–	0
Muhlenberg +	5	–	2	–	0	6	–	3	–	0
Franklin & Marshall	4	–	3	–	0	5	–	4	–	0
Johns Hopkins	3	–	4	–	0	5	–	4	–	0
Western Maryland	3	–	4	–	0	4	–	4	–	1
Ursinus	2	–	5	–	0	4	–	5	–	0
Dickinson	1	–	6	–	0	2	–	7	–	0
+ – Conference co-champions

1984 Centennial Conference football standings
	Conf.					Overall
Team	W		L		T	W		L		T
Swarthmore +	6	–	1	–	0	8	–	1	–	0
Gettysburg +	6	–	1	–	0	8	–	2	–	0
Muhlenberg	5	–	2	–	0	6	–	3	–	0
Franklin & Marshall	4	–	3	–	0	5	–	4	–	0
Johns Hopkins	3	–	4	–	0	5	–	4	–	0
Ursinus	2	–	5	–	0	4	–	5	–	0
Western Maryland	2	–	5	–	0	3	–	6	–	0
Dickinson	0	–	7	–	0	1	–	9	–	0
+ – Conference co-champions

1985 Centennial Conference football standings
	Conf.					Overall
Team	W		L		T	W		L		T
Gettysburg $^	6	–	0	–	1	11	–	1	–	1
Franklin & Marshall	5	–	1	–	1	7	–	2	–	1
Muhlenberg	5	–	2	–	0	7	–	3	–	0
Johns Hopkins	4	–	3	–	0	6	–	3	–	0
Ursinus	3	–	4	–	0	5	–	4	–	0
Swarthmore	3	–	4	–	0	4	–	5	–	0
Dickinson	1	–	6	–	0	1	–	8	–	0
Western Maryland	0	–	7	–	0	0	–	9	–	0
$ – Conference champion; ^ – NCAA Division III playoff participant

1986 Centennial Conference football standings
	Conf.					Overall
Team	W		L		T	W		L		T
Franklin & Marshall +	6	–	1	–	0	8	–	3	–	0
Muhlenberg +	6	–	1	–	0	7	–	3	–	0
Gettysburg	5	–	2	–	0	6	–	4	–	0
Swarthmore	4	–	3	–	0	4	–	5	–	0
Johns Hopkins	2	–	4	–	1	3	–	5	–	1
Ursinus	2	–	4	–	1	2	–	6	–	1
Dickinson	2	–	5	–	0	4	–	6	–	0
Western Maryland	0	–	7	–	0	0	–	10	–	0
+ – Conference co-champions

1987 Centennial Conference football standings
	Conf.					Overall
Team	W		L		T	W		L		T
Franklin & Marshall $	7	–	0	–	0	9	–	1	–	1
Dickinson	5	–	2	–	0	7	–	3	–	0
Muhlenberg	5	–	2	–	0	7	–	3	–	0
Gettysburg	4	–	3	–	0	7	–	3	–	0
Johns Hopkins	3	–	4	–	0	4	–	6	–	0
Ursinus	2	–	5	–	0	3	–	6	–	0
Swarthmore	1	–	6	–	0	2	–	8	–	0
Western Maryland	1	–	6	–	0	1	–	8	–	1
$ – Conference champion

1988 Centennial Conference football standings
	Conf.					Overall
Team	W		L		T	W		L		T
Dickinson +	6	–	1	–	0	10	–	1	–	0
Franklin & Marshall +	6	–	1	–	0	7	–	3	–	0
Muhlenberg	5	–	2	–	0	7	–	3	–	0
Gettysburg	4	–	3	–	0	4	–	6	–	0
Ursinus	3	–	4	–	0	3	–	7	–	0
Swarthmore	2	–	5	–	0	2	–	8	–	0
Johns Hopkins	1	–	6	–	0	1	–	9	–	0
Western Maryland	1	–	6	–	0	1	–	9	–	0
+ – Conference co-champions

1989 Centennial Conference football standings
	Conf.					Overall
Team	W		L		T	W		L		T
Dickinson $^	7	–	0	–	0	9	–	1	–	1
Franklin & Marshall	6	–	1	–	0	10	–	1	–	0
Muhlenberg	4	–	2	–	1	5	–	4	–	1
Ursinus	3	–	4	–	0	5	–	5	–	0
Swarthmore	3	–	4	–	0	5	–	5	–	0
Gettysburg	2	–	4	–	1	2	–	7	–	1
Western Maryland	1	–	6	–	0	2	–	8	–	0
Johns Hopkins	1	–	6	–	0	1	–	9	–	0
$ – Conference champion; ^ – NCAA Division III playoff participant

1990 Centennial Conference football standings
	Conf.					Overall
Team	W		L		T	W		L		T
Dickinson $	5	–	1	–	1	8	–	1	–	1
Western Maryland	5	–	2	–	0	6	–	3	–	1
Johns Hopkins	4	–	2	–	1	5	–	4	–	1
Swarthmore	4	–	3	–	0	7	–	3	–	0
Gettysburg	4	–	3	–	0	4	–	5	–	1
Ursinus	2	–	5	–	0	4	–	5	–	0
Franklin & Marshall	2	–	5	–	0	3	–	7	–	0
Muhlenberg	1	–	6	–	0	2	–	8	–	0
$ – Conference champion

1991 Centennial Conference football standings
	Conf.					Overall
Team	W		L		T	W		L		T
Dickinson $^	7	–	0	–	0	9	–	1	–	0
Franklin & Marshall	5	–	2	–	0	6	–	4	–	0
Western Maryland	4	–	3	–	0	5	–	5	–	0
Johns Hopkins	3	–	4	–	0	5	–	4	–	1
Ursinus	3	–	4	–	0	5	–	5	–	0
Muhlenberg	3	–	4	–	0	3	–	7	–	0
Gettysburg	2	–	5	–	0	2	–	7	–	0
Swarthmore	1	–	6	–	0	2	–	7	–	0
$ – Conference champion; ^ – NCAA Division III playoff participant

1992 Centennial Conference football standings
	Conf.					Overall
Team	W		L		T	W		L		T
Dickinson $	5	–	1	–	1	8	–	2	–	1
Swarthmore	4	–	2	–	1	5	–	3	–	1
Gettysburg	4	–	3	–	0	6	–	4	–	0
Johns Hopkins	4	–	3	–	0	6	–	4	–	0
Western Maryland	4	–	3	–	0	5	–	5	–	0
Franklin & Marshall	3	–	4	–	0	5	–	5	–	0
Ursinus	2	–	5	–	0	4	–	6	–	0
Muhlenberg	1	–	6	–	0	1	–	8	–	1
$ – Conference champion

1993 Centennial Conference football standings
	Conf.					Overall
Team	W		L		T	W		L		T
Dickinson +	5	–	2	–	0	7	–	4	–	0
Franklin & Marshall +	5	–	2	–	0	6	–	4	–	0
Ursinus	4	–	3	–	0	5	–	4	–	0
Gettysburg	4	–	3	–	0	5	–	5	–	0
Muhlenberg	4	–	3	–	0	4	–	5	–	0
Johns Hopkins	2	–	5	–	0	4	–	6	–	0
Western Maryland	2	–	5	–	0	3	–	5	–	1
Swarthmore	2	–	5	–	0	3	–	6	–	0
+ – Conference co-champions

1994 Centennial Conference football standings
	Conf.					Overall
Team	W		L		T	W		L		T
Dickinson $^	7	–	0	–	0	10	–	1	–	0
Gettysburg	6	–	1	–	0	8	–	2	–	0
Western Maryland	4	–	3	–	0	5	–	4	–	0
Johns Hopkins	4	–	3	–	0	4	–	6	–	0
Swarthmore	3	–	4	–	0	3	–	7	–	0
Ursinus	3	–	4	–	0	3	–	7	–	0
Muhlenberg	1	–	6	–	0	2	–	8	–	0
Franklin & Marshall	0	–	7	–	0	1	–	9	–	0
$ – Conference champion; ^ – NCAA Division III playoff participant

1995 Centennial Conference football standings
	Conf.					Overall
Team	W		L		T	W		L		T
Franklin & Marshall $	6	–	1	–	0	7	–	3	–	0
Dickinson	5	–	1	–	1	7	–	2	–	1
Johns Hopkins	4	–	2	–	1	6	–	3	–	1
Western Maryland	3	–	2	–	2	5	–	3	–	2
Gettysburg	3	–	3	–	1	5	–	4	–	1
Swarthmore	3	–	4	–	0	5	–	5	–	0
Ursinus	1	–	6	–	0	3	–	7	–	0
Muhlenberg	0	–	6	–	1	0	–	9	–	1
$ – Conference champion

1996 Centennial Conference football standings
	Conf.			Overall
Team	W		L	W		L
Ursinus $^	7	–	0	9	–	2
Franklin & Marshall	6	–	1	9	–	2
Johns Hopkins	5	–	2	7	–	3
Dickinson	3	–	4	5	–	5
Western Maryland	3	–	4	4	–	6
Gettysburg	3	–	4	3	–	7
Muhlenberg	1	–	6	1	–	9
Swarthmore	0	–	7	0	–	10
$ – Conference champion; ^ – NCAA Division III playoff participant

1997 Centennial Conference football standings
	Conf.			Overall
Team	W		L	W		L
Western Maryland $^	7	–	0	10	–	1
Dickinson	6	–	1	7	–	3
Johns Hopkins	5	–	2	7	–	3
Franklin & Marshall	4	–	3	4	–	6
Ursinus	3	–	4	4	–	6
Gettysburg	2	–	5	4	–	6
Muhlenberg	1	–	6	1	–	9
Swarthmore	0	–	7	0	–	10
$ – Conference champion; ^ – NCAA Division III playoff participant

1998 Centennial Conference football standings
	Conf.			Overall
Team	W		L	W		L
Western Maryland $^	7	–	0	10	–	2
Dickinson	5	–	2	8	–	3
Johns Hopkins	5	–	2	7	–	3
Franklin & Marshall	4	–	3	4	–	6
Muhlenberg	3	–	4	5	–	5
Gettysburg	2	–	5	3	–	7
Ursinus	2	–	5	3	–	7
Swarthmore	0	–	7	0	–	8
$ – Conference champion; ^ – NCAA Division III playoff participant

1999 Centennial Conference football standings
	Conf.			Overall
Team	W		L	W		L
Western Maryland $^	7	–	0	11	–	1
Ursinus ^	6	–	1	10	–	2
Dickinson	4	–	3	6	–	4
Muhlenberg	4	–	3	6	–	4
Johns Hopkins	3	–	4	4	–	6
Gettysburg	2	–	5	3	–	7
Franklin & Marshall	1	–	6	2	–	8
Swarthmore	0	–	7	1	–	8
$ – Conference champion; ^ – NCAA Division III playoff participant

2000 Centennial Conference football standings
	Conf.			Overall
Team	W		L	W		L
Western Maryland $^	7	–	0	10	–	2
Muhlenberg	5	–	2	9	–	2
Ursinus	5	–	2	8	–	3
Johns Hopkins	4	–	3	5	–	5
Dickinson	4	–	3	5	–	5
Swarthmore	2	–	5	4	–	5
Gettysburg	1	–	6	1	–	9
Franklin & Marshall	0	–	7	0	–	10
$ – Conference champion; ^ – NCAA Division III playoff participant

2001 Centennial Conference football standings
	Conf.			Overall
Team	W		L	W		L
Western Maryland +^	5	–	1	8	–	3
Muhlenberg +	5	–	1	7	–	4
Johns Hopkins	4	–	2	6	–	3
Ursinus	3	–	3	6	–	4
Dickinson	3	–	3	5	–	5
Gettysburg	1	–	5	4	–	6
Franklin & Marshall	0	–	6	1	–	9
+ – Conference co-champions; ^ – NCAA Division III playoff participant

2002 Centennial Conference football standings
	Conf.			Overall
Team	W		L	W		L
Muhlenberg +^	5	–	1	10	–	2
Johns Hopkins +	5	–	1	9	–	2
McDaniel +	5	–	1	9	–	2
Dickinson	3	–	3	5	–	5
Franklin & Marshall	2	–	4	4	–	6
Gettysburg	1	–	5	4	–	6
Ursinus	0	–	6	2	–	8
+ – Conference co-champions; ^ – NCAA Division III playoff participant

2003 Centennial Conference football standings
	Conf.			Overall
Team	W		L	W		L
No. 25 Johns Hopkins +	5	–	1	10	–	1
Muhlenberg +	5	–	1	7	–	3
McDaniel	4	–	2	5	–	5
Franklin & Marshall	3	–	3	4	–	6
Gettysburg	2	–	4	5	–	5
Dickinson	2	–	4	4	–	6
Ursinus	0	–	6	3	–	7
+ – Conference co-champions; ^ – NCAA Division III playoff participant; Rankings from D3football.com

2004 Centennial Conference football standings
	Conf.			Overall
Team	W		L	W		L
Johns Hopkins +	4	–	2	9	–	2
Franklin & Marshall +	4	–	2	8	–	3
Muhlenberg +	4	–	2	8	–	3
Dickinson +	4	–	2	6	–	4
McDaniel +	4	–	2	6	–	4
Gettysburg	1	–	5	1	–	9
Ursinus	0	–	6	1	–	9
+ – Conference co-champions

2005 Centennial Conference football standings
	Conf.			Overall
Team	W		L	W		L
Johns Hopkins $^	5	–	1	8	–	3
Franklin & Marshall	4	–	2	5	–	6
Dickinson	3	–	3	4	–	6
Gettysburg	3	–	3	4	–	6
McDaniel	2	–	4	5	–	5
Ursinus	2	–	4	4	–	6
Muhlenberg	2	–	4	3	–	7
$ – Conference champion; ^ – NCAA Division III playoff participant

2006 Centennial Conference football standings
	Conf.			Overall
Team	W		L	W		L
Dickinson $^	5	–	1	8	–	3
Ursinus	4	–	2	8	–	3
Gettysburg	3	–	3	5	–	5
Johns Hopkins	3	–	3	5	–	5
Muhlenberg	2	–	4	5	–	5
McDaniel	2	–	4	4	–	6
Franklin & Marshall	2	–	4	3	–	7
$ – Conference champion; ^ – NCAA Division III playoff participant

2007 Centennial Conference football standings
	Conf.			Overall
Team	W		L	W		L
No. 8 Muhlenberg $^	8	–	0	11	–	1
Dickinson	6	–	2	9	–	2
Ursinus	5	–	3	7	–	3
Gettysburg	5	–	3	6	–	5
Moravian	4	–	4	6	–	4
Franklin & Marshall	4	–	4	4	–	6
Johns Hopkins	3	–	5	4	–	6
McDaniel	1	–	7	1	–	9
Juniata	0	–	8	1	–	9
$ – Conference champion; ^ – NCAA Division III playoff participant; Rankings from D3football.com

2008 Centennial Conference football standings
	Conf.			Overall
Team	W		L	W		L
No. 25 Muhlenberg $^	7	–	1	9	–	2
Johns Hopkins	6	–	2	8	–	3
Moravian	6	–	2	8	–	3
Dickinson	5	–	3	6	–	4
Gettysburg	5	–	3	5	–	5
Franklin & Marshall	3	–	5	4	–	6
Ursinus	2	–	6	3	–	7
McDaniel	1	–	7	2	–	8
Juniata	1	–	7	1	–	9
$ – Conference champion; ^ – NCAA Division III playoff participant; Rankings from D3football.com

2009 Centennial Conference football standings
	Conf.			Overall
Team	W		L	W		L
No. 11 Johns Hopkins $^	7	–	1	10	–	3
Franklin & Marshall	6	–	2	9	–	2
Dickinson	6	–	2	8	–	2
Ursinus	6	–	2	6	–	5
McDaniel	3	–	5	5	–	5
Gettysburg	3	–	5	3	–	7
Muhlenberg	2	–	6	3	–	7
Moravian	2	–	6	2	–	8
Juniata	1	–	7	1	–	9
$ – Conference champion; ^ – NCAA Division III playoff participant; Rankings from D3football.com

2010 Centennial Conference football standings
	Conf.			Overall
Team	W		L	W		L
Ursinus +	7	–	2	8	–	2
Johns Hopkins +	7	–	2	8	–	3
Muhlenberg +^	7	–	2	7	–	4
Moravian	6	–	3	7	–	4
Gettysburg	5	–	4	6	–	4
Franklin & Marshall	5	–	4	6	–	5
McDaniel	4	–	5	5	–	5
Dickinson	3	–	6	3	–	7
Susquehanna	1	–	8	2	–	8
Juniata	0	–	9	0	–	10
+ – Conference co-champions; ^ – NCAA Division III playoff participant

2011 Centennial Conference football standings
	Conf.			Overall
Team	W		L	W		L
No. 18 Johns Hopkins $^	9	–	0	10	–	1
Muhlenberg	7	–	2	7	–	3
Gettysburg	6	–	3	6	–	4
Ursinus	6	–	3	6	–	4
Susquehanna	5	–	4	6	–	4
Dickinson	4	–	5	4	–	6
Franklin & Marshall	3	–	6	3	–	7
McDaniel	2	–	7	2	–	8
Moravian	2	–	7	2	–	8
Juniata	1	–	8	1	–	9
$ – Conference champion; ^ – NCAA Division III playoff participant; Rankings from D3football.com

2012 Centennial Conference football standings
	Conf.			Overall
Team	W		L	W		L
No. 22 Johns Hopkins $^	8	–	1	10	–	2
Muhlenberg	7	–	2	8	–	3
Gettysburg	6	–	3	7	–	3
Franklin & Marshall	6	–	3	7	–	4
Susquehanna	5	–	4	6	–	4
Ursinus	5	–	4	6	–	4
Dickinson	4	–	5	4	–	6
Juniata	2	–	7	3	–	7
Moravian	2	–	7	2	–	8
McDaniel	0	–	9	0	–	10
$ – Conference champion; ^ – NCAA Division III playoff participant; Rankings from D3football.com

2013 Centennial Conference football standings
	Conf.			Overall
Team	W		L	W		L
No. 12 Johns Hopkins $^	9	–	0	10	–	1
Muhlenberg	7	–	2	8	–	3
Ursinus	6	–	3	7	–	3
Franklin & Marshall	6	–	3	7	–	4
Juniata	6	–	3	7	–	4
Gettysburg	3	–	6	4	–	6
Dickinson	3	–	6	3	–	7
McDaniel	2	–	7	2	–	8
Moravian	2	–	7	2	–	8
Susquehanna	1	–	8	1	–	9
$ – Conference champion; ^ – NCAA Division III playoff participant; Rankings from D3football.com

2014 Centennial Conference football standings
	Conf.			Overall
Team	W		L	W		L
No. 10 Johns Hopkins $^	9	–	0	11	–	1
No. 23 Muhlenberg ^	8	–	1	9	–	2
Ursinus	6	–	3	7	–	3
Gettysburg	5	–	4	5	–	5
Franklin & Marshall	4	–	5	5	–	5
Juniata	4	–	5	5	–	5
Moravian	4	–	5	5	–	5
Dickinson	3	–	6	3	–	7
Susquehanna	2	–	7	2	–	8
McDaniel	0	–	9	1	–	9
$ – Conference champion; ^ – NCAA Division III playoff participant; Rankings from D3football.com

2015 Centennial Conference football standings
	Conf.			Overall
Team	W		L	W		L
No. 13 Johns Hopkins $^	9	–	0	11	–	1
Moravian	7	–	2	8	–	3
Muhlenberg	7	–	2	8	–	3
Gettysburg	6	–	3	7	–	3
Franklin & Marshall	5	–	4	6	–	4
Susquehanna	4	–	5	5	–	5
Dickinson	3	–	6	3	–	7
Juniata	2	–	7	3	–	7
Ursinus	2	–	7	3	–	7
McDaniel	0	–	9	0	–	10
$ – Conference champion; ^ – NCAA Division III playoff participant; Rankings from D3football.com

2016 Centennial Conference football standings
	Conf.			Overall
Team	W		L	W		L
No. 11 Johns Hopkins $^	9	–	0	11	–	1
Muhlenberg	8	–	1	9	–	2
Franklin & Marshall	6	–	3	7	–	4
Susquehanna	6	–	3	6	–	4
Moravian	4	–	5	5	–	5
Juniata	3	–	6	4	–	6
Gettysburg	3	–	6	3	–	7
McDaniel	3	–	6	3	–	7
Ursinus	2	–	7	2	–	8
Dickinson	1	–	8	1	–	9
$ – Conference champion; ^ – NCAA Division III playoff participant; Rankings from D3football.com

2017 Centennial Conference football standings
	Conf.			Overall
Team	W		L	W		L
Franklin & Marshall +	8	–	1	10	–	1
No. 20 Johns Hopkins +^	8	–	1	9	–	2
Muhlenberg	6	–	3	8	–	3
Susquehanna	6	–	3	8	–	3
Ursinus	5	–	4	6	–	4
Dickinson	3	–	6	3	–	7
Gettysburg	3	–	6	3	–	7
Juniata	2	–	7	3	–	7
McDaniel	2	–	7	3	–	7
Moravian	2	–	7	2	–	8
+ – Conference co-champions; ^ – NCAA Division III playoff participant; Rankings from D3football.com

2018 Centennial Conference football standings
	Conf.			Overall
Team	W		L	W		L
No. 5 Johns Hopkins +^	8	–	1	12	–	2
No. 9 Muhlenberg +^	8	–	1	11	–	2
Franklin & Marshall	6	–	3	7	–	3
Susquehanna	6	–	3	7	–	3
Ursinus	6	–	3	7	–	3
Moravian	4	–	5	5	–	5
Dickinson	4	–	5	4	–	6
McDaniel	2	–	7	3	–	7
Gettysburg	1	–	8	1	–	9
Juniata	0	–	9	0	–	10
+ – Conference co-champions; ^ – NCAA Division III playoff participant; Rankings from D3football.com

2019 Centennial Conference football standings
	Conf.			Overall
Team	W		L	W		L
No. 7 Muhlenberg $^	9	–	0	13	–	1
No. 16 Susquehanna	8	–	1	10	–	1
Johns Hopkins	6	–	3	8	–	3
Franklin & Marshall	5	–	4	7	–	4
Dickinson	4	–	5	5	–	5
Ursinus	4	–	5	5	–	5
Moravian	4	–	5	4	–	6
McDaniel	2	–	7	3	–	7
Juniata	2	–	7	2	–	8
Gettysburg	1	–	8	1	–	9
$ – Conference champion; ^ – NCAA Division III playoff participant; Rankings from D3football.com

2021 Centennial Conference football standings
	Conf.			Overall
Team	W		L	W		L
No. 7 Muhlenberg +^	8	–	1	11	–	2
No. 13 Johns Hopkins +^	8	–	1	10	–	2
Susquehanna	7	–	2	9	–	2
Ursinus	6	–	3	7	–	4
Franklin & Marshall	5	–	4	6	–	5
Dickinson	4	–	5	4	–	6
Moravian	3	–	6	3	–	7
McDaniel	2	–	7	2	–	8
Gettysburg	1	–	8	1	–	9
Juniata	1	–	8	1	–	9
+ – Conference co-champions; ^ – NCAA Division III playoff participant; Rankings from AFCA Poll

2022 Centennial Conference football standings
	Conf.			Overall
Team	W		L	W		L
No. 20 Susquehanna $^	9	–	0	10	–	1
No. 21 Johns Hopkins	8	–	1	10	–	1
Ursinus	7	–	2	9	–	2
Muhlenberg	6	–	3	7	–	4
Franklin & Marshall	5	–	4	6	–	4
Dickinson	3	–	6	3	–	7
Moravian	3	–	6	3	–	7
McDaniel	3	–	6	3	–	7
Gettysburg	1	–	8	1	–	9
Juniata	0	–	9	0	–	10
$ – Conference champion; ^ – NCAA Division III playoff participant; Rankings from AFCA Poll

2023 Centennial Conference football standings
	Conf.			Overall
Team	W		L	W		L
No. 8 Johns Hopkins $^	6	–	0	12	–	1
No. 22 Muhlenberg	5	–	1	10	–	1
Franklin & Marshall	3	–	3	8	–	3
Ursinus	3	–	3	8	–	3
Dickinson	3	–	3	6	–	4
Gettysburg	1	–	5	2	–	8
McDaniel	0	–	6	0	–	10
$ – Conference champion; ^ – NCAA Division III playoff participant; Rankings from D3Football.com

2024 Centennial Conference football standings
	Conf.			Overall
Team	W		L	W		L
No. 19 Johns Hopkins $^	6	–	0	12	–	2
Ursinus ^	5	–	1	9	–	2
Muhlenberg	4	–	2	8	–	3
Franklin & Marshall	3	–	3	7	–	4
Dickinson	2	–	4	5	–	6
Gettysburg	1	–	5	2	–	8
McDaniel	0	–	6	1	–	9
$ – Conference champion; ^ – NCAA Division III playoff participant; Rankings from D3football.com

== Championship records ==
=== By school ===
School	Championships	Years
Johns Hopkins	17	2002, 2003, 2004, 2005, 2009, 2010, 2011, 2012, 2013, 2014, 2015, 2016, 2017, 2018, 2021, 2023, 2024
Muhlenberg	12	1983, 1986, 2001, 2002, 2003, 2004, 2007, 2008, 2010, 2018, 2019, 2021
Dickinson	10	1988, 1989, 1990, 1991, 1992, 1993, 1994, 2004, 2006, 2026
Franklin & Marshall	8	1986, 1987, 1988, 1993, 1995, 2004, 2017, 2025
McDaniel	7	1997, 1998, 1999, 2000, 2001, 2002, 2004
Gettysburg	3	1983, 1984, 1985
Ursinus	2	1996, 2010
Swarthmore	2	1983, 1984
Susquehanna	1	2022
Carnegie Mellon	0	
Juniata	0	
Moravian	0	

=== By year ===
		Record		
Year	Champions	Conference	Overall	Head coach
1983	Gettysburg	5–2	8–2	Barry H. Streeter
1983	Muhlenberg	5–2	6–3	Ralph Kirchenheiter
1983	Swarthmore	5–2	7–2	Tom Lapinski
1984	Gettysburg	6–1	8–2	Barry H. Streeter
1984	Swarthmore	6–1	8–1	Tom Lapinski
1985	Gettysburg	6–0–1	11–1–1	Barry H. Streeter
1986	Franklin & Marshall	6–1	8–3	Tom Gilburg
1986	Muhlenberg	6–1	7–3	Ralph Kirchenheiter
1987	Franklin & Marshall	7–0	9–1–1	Tom Gilburg
1988	Dickinson	6–1	10–1	Ed Sweeney
1988	Franklin & Marshall	6–1	7–3	Tom Gilburg
1989	Dickinson	7–0	9–1–1	Ed Sweeney
1990	Dickinson	5–1–1	8–1–1	Ed Sweeney
1991	Dickinson	7–0	9–1	Ed Sweeney
1992	Dickinson	5–1–1	8–2–1	Ed Sweeney
1993	Dickinson	5–2	7–4	Darwin Breaux
1993	Franklin & Marshall	5–2	6–4	Tom Gilburg
1994	Dickinson	7–0	10–1	Darwin Breaux
1995	Franklin & Marshall	6–1	7–3	Tom Gilburg
1996	Ursinus	7–0	9–2	Steve Gilbert
1997	McDaniel	7–0	10–1	Tim Keating
1998	McDaniel	7–0	10–2	Tim Keating
1999	McDaniel	7–0	11–1	Tim Keating
2000	McDaniel	7–0	10–2	Tim Keating
2001	McDaniel	5–1	8–3	Tim Keating
2001	Muhlenberg	5–1	7–4	Mike Donnelly
2002	Johns Hopkins	5–1	9–2	Jim Margraff
2002	McDaniel	5–1	9–2	Tim Keating
2002	Muhlenberg	5–1	10–2	Mike Donnelly
2003	Johns Hopkins	5–1	10–1	Jim Margraff
2003	Muhlenberg	5–1	7–3	Mike Donnelly
2004	Dickinson	4–2	6–4	Darwin Breaux
2004	Franklin & Marshall	4–2	8–3	Shawn Halloran
2004	Johns Hopkins	4–2	9–2	Jim Margraff
2004	McDaniel	4–2	6–4	Tim Keating
2004	Muhlenberg	4–2	8–3	Mike Donnelly
2005	Johns Hopkins	5–1	8–3	Jim Margraff
2006	Dickinson	5–1	8–3	Darwin Breaux
2007	Muhlenberg	8–0	11–1	Mike Donnelly
2008	Muhlenberg	7–1	9–2	Mike Donnelly
2009	Johns Hopkins	7–1	10–3	Jim Margraff
2010	Johns Hopkins	7–2	8–3	Jim Margraff
2010	Muhlenberg	7–2	7–4	Mike Donnelly
2010	Ursinus	7–2	8–2	Peter Gallagher
2011	Johns Hopkins	9–0	10–1	Jim Margraff
2012	Johns Hopkins	8–1	10–2	Jim Margraff
2013	Johns Hopkins	9–0	10–1	Jim Margraff
2014	Johns Hopkins	9–0	11–1	Jim Margraff
2015	Johns Hopkins	9–0	11–1	Jim Margraff
2016	Johns Hopkins	9–0	11–1	Jim Margraff
2017	Franklin & Marshall	8–1	10–1	John Troxell
2017	Johns Hopkins	8–1	9–2	Jim Margraff
2018	Johns Hopkins	8–1	12–2	Jim Margraff
2018	Muhlenberg	8–1	11–2	Nate Milne
2019	Muhlenberg	9–0	13–1	Nate Milne
2021	Johns Hopkins	8–1	9–1	Greg Chimera
2021	Muhlenberg	8–1	9–1	Nate Milne
2022	Susquehanna	9–0	10-1	Tom Perkovich
2023	Johns Hopkins	6–0	12–1	Greg Chimera
2024	Johns Hopkins	6–0	12–2	Dan Wodicka
2025	Franklin & Marshall	7–0	9–2	Michael Phelan
2026	Dickinson	6–1	8–2	Brad Fordyce
