= List of Franklin & Marshall Diplomats head football coaches =

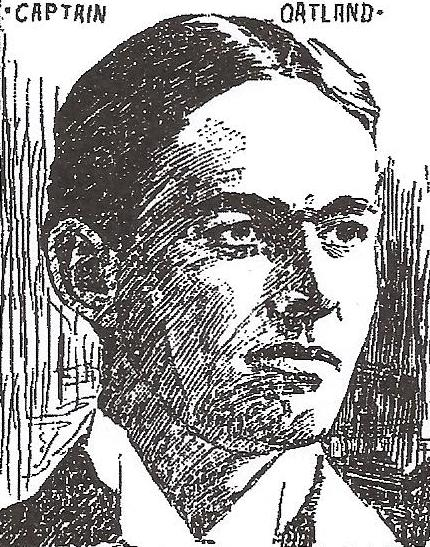
The 11th head coach was John Outland, the namesake for the Outland Trophy.

The Franklin & Marshall Diplomats football program is a college football team that represents Franklin & Marshall College as a member of the Centennial Conference at the NCAA Division III level. The team has had 40 head coaches since its first recorded football game in 1887. The current coach is Michael Phelan, who took the position in 2025.

Among the coaches for the program include Hall of Fame coach John H. Outland, namesake of the Outland Trophy.

== Key ==
Key to symbols in coaches list
General		Overall		Conference		Postseason (Note: Although the first Rose Bowl Game was played in 1902, it has been continuously played since the 1916 game, and is recognized as the oldest bowl game by the NCAA. "—" indicates any season prior to 1916 when postseason games were not played.)	
No.	Order of coaches (Note: A running total of the number of head coaches, with coaches who served separate tenures being counted only once. Interim head coaches are represented with "Int" and are not counted in the running total. "—" indicates the team played but either without a coach or no coach is on record. "X" indicates an interim year without play.)	GC	Games coached	CW	Conference wins	PW	Postseason wins
DC	Division championships	OW	Overall wins	CL	Conference losses	PL	Postseason losses
CC	Conference championships	OL	Overall losses	CT	Conference ties	PT	Postseason ties
NC	National championships	OT	Overall ties (Note: Overtime rules in college football were introduced in 1996, making ties impossible in the period since.)	C%	Conference winning percentage		
†	Elected to the College Football Hall of Fame	O%	Overall winning percentage (Note: When computing the win–loss percentage, a tie counts as half a win and half a loss.)				

== Coaches ==
Statistics correct as of the end of the 2025 college football season.

No.	Name	Term	GC	OW	OL	OT	O%	CW	CL	CT	C%	PW	PL	CCs	NCs	Awards
1	Miles O. Noll	1887	2	0	2	0	.000	—	—	—		—	—	—	—	
X	No team	1888	—	—	—	—	—	—	—	—		—	—	—	—	
2	William Mann Irvine	1889–1990	17	13	3	1	.794	—	—	—		—	—	—	—	
3	Bruce Griffith	1891–1892	13	6	7	0	.462	—	—	—		—	—	—	—	
4	Eugene P. Skyles	1893	7	4	2	1	.643	—	—	—		—	—	—	—	
5	George W. Hartman	1894	10	6	4	0	.600	—	—	—		—	—	—	—	
6	Ward W. Reese	1895	9	3	5	1	.389	—	—	—		—	—	—	—	
7	Alfred E. Bull	1896–1897	19	5	10	4	.368	—	—	—		—	—	—	—	
8	M. Delmar Ritchie	1898	10	4	4	2	.500	—	—	—		—	—	—	—	
9	Harry Shindle Wingert	1899	9	3	5	1	.389	—	—	—		—	—	—	—	
10	John H. Outland^{†}	1900	9	4	5	0	.444	—	—	—		—	—	—	—	
11	John C. Hedges	1901	11	7	3	1	.682	—	—	—		—	—	—	—	
12	John Chalmers	1902	9	7	2	0	.778	—	—	—		—	—	—	—	
13	D. R. Brown	1903	11	5	5	1	.500	—	—	—		—	—	—	—	
14	William Penn Bates	1904–1905	20	4	16	0	.200	—	—	—		—	—	—	—	
15	Samuel L. Moyer	1906	9	3	5	1	.389	—	—	—		—	—	—	—	
16	Vere Triechler	1907	10	4	6	0	.400	—	—	—		—	—	—	—	
17	Jack Hollenback	1908–1909	21	13	7	1	.643	—	—	—		—	—	—	—	
18	Frank Mount Pleasant	1910	9	4	3	2	.556	—	—	—		—	—	—	—	
19	Dexter W. Draper	1911–1912	19	9	10	0	.474	—	—	—		—	—	—	—	
20	Charles Mayser	1913–1914, 1924–1925, 1944–1945	49	25	21	3	.541	—	—	—		—	—	—	—	
21	John M. Reed	1915	8	6	2	0	.750	—	—	—		—	—	—	—	
22	O. Webster Saylor	1916	8	1	7	0	.125	—	—	—		—	—	—	—	
23	Arthur S. Herman	1917	8	2	6	0	.250	—	—	—		—	—	—	—	
24	Harry D. Weller	1918	3	2	1	0	.667	—	—	—		—	—	—	—	
25	Byron W. Dickson	1919	8	2	4	2	.375	—	—	—		—	—	—	—	
26	John B. Price	1920–1923	35	20	10	5	.643	—	—	—		—	—	—	—	
27	Ken Shroyer	1926–1927	18	1	15	2	.111	1	5	1	.214	—	—	0	—	
28	Jonathan K. Miller	1928–1930	27	15	11	1	.574	6	5	1	.542	—	—	0	—	
29	Alan M. Holman	1931–1941	93	63	25	5	.704	28	10	3	.720	—	—	7	—	
30	Dick Barker	1942–1943	16	9	5	2	.625	0	2	1	.167	—	—	0	—	
31	Charles R. Soleau	1946–1947	15	7	7	1	.500	—	—	—		—	—	—	—	
32	S. Woodrow Sponaugle	1948–1962	123	59	58	6	.504	5	13	1	.289	—	—	0	—	
33	George H. Storck	1963–1967	39	20	17	2	.538	18	13	2	.576	—	—	0	—	
34	David Pooley	1968–1970	24	10	14	0	.417	10	11	0	.476	—	—	0	—	
35	Bob Curtis	1971–1974	35	32	3	0	.914	30	2	0	.938	—	—	0	—	
36	Tom Gilburg	1975–2002	274	160	112	2	.588	126	76	1	.623	2	2	5	—	
37	Shawn Halloran	2003–2005	32	17	15	—	.531	11	7	—	.611	1	1	1	—	
38	John Troxell	2006–2021	159	92	67	—	.579	74	55	—	.574	6	3	1	—	
39	Tom Blumenauer	2022–2025	32	21	11	—	.656	11	10	—	.524	2	0	0	—	
40	Michael Phelan	2025–present	10	9	2	—	.818	7	0	—	1.000	0	1	0	—	
