= Skyles =

Skyles may refer to:

== Places ==
- Skyles, West Virginia, an unincorporated community, United States
- Skyles Creek, a stream, West Virginia, United States

== People ==
- Charles Skyles, an American politician
- N. H. Skyles, an American football coach
- Ethel Skyles Alexander (1925-2016), an American politician

== Other ==
- Skyles Electric Works

== See also ==
- Scyles, a Scythian king who lived around 500 BC
