= 2025 Franklin & Marshall Diplomats football team =

American college football season

2025 Franklin & Marshall Diplomats football

Centennial champion

NCAA Division III Second Round, L 24–28 vs. Eastern
- Conference: Centennial Conference

Ranking
- AFCA: No. 22
- D3Football.com: No. 23
- Record: 9–2 (7–0 Centennial)
- Head coach: Michael Phelan (1st season)
- Offensive coordinator: Matt Quattrone (4th season)
- Defensive coordinator: Mike Furlong (1st season)
- Captain: Gary Lewis
- Home stadium: Shadek Stadium

2025 Centennial Conference football standings
	Conf.			Overall
Team	W		L	W		L
No. 23 Franklin & Marshall $^	7	–	0	9	–	2
No. 3 Johns Hopkins ^	6	–	1	12	–	2
Muhlenberg ^	5	–	2	9	–	3
Ursinus	3	–	4	7	–	4
Carnegie Mellon	3	–	4	6	–	5
Dickinson	3	–	4	5	–	6
Gettysburg	1	–	6	1	–	9
McDaniel	0	–	7	1	–	9
$ – Conference champion; ^ – NCAA Division III playoff participant; Rankings from D3football.com

The 2025 Franklin & Marshall Diplomats football team was an American football team that represented Franklin & Marshall College as a member of the Centennial Conference during the 2025 NCAA Division III football season. In its first season under head coach Michael Phelan, the Diplomats compiled a 9–2 record (7–0 against Centennial opponents) and won the Centennial Conference championship in an overtime upset win over reigning champ Johns Hopkins. The team played its home games at Shadek Stadium in Lancaster, Pennsylvania.

The Centennial Conference title earned the Diplomats an automatic bid to the NCAA Division III football championship. The appearance snapped the Diplomats' 1,229 game streak without a post-season tournament appearance, the longest in NCAA Division III. The Diplomats hosted the Eastern University Eagles in the second round of the NCAA tournament, losing 28-24 in both program's post-season debut.

== Schedule ==
Date	Opponent	Site	Result	Attendance	Source
September 4	at Lebanon Valley*	Arnold Field; Annville, PA	W 31–21	3,097	
September 13	Westminster (PA)*	Shadek Stadium; Lancaster, PA	L 7–27	875	
September 20	Catholic University*^{†}	Shadek Stadium; Lancaster, PA	W 42–7	2,150	
October 4	at Gettysburg	Musselman Stadium; Gettysburg, PA	W 35–28	1,832	
October 11	Muhlenberg	Shadek Stadium; Lancaster, PA	W 28–27	875	
October 18	at Dickinson	Biddle Field Complex; Carlisle, PA	W 23–20	765	
October 25	at Ursinus	Patterson Field; Collegeville, PA	W 52–20	1,047	
November 1	McDaniel	Shadek Stadium; Lancaster, PA	W 24–3	1,250	
November 8	at Carnegie Mellon	Gesling Stadium; Pittsburgh, PA	W 31–24	2,708	
November 15	Johns Hopkins	Shadek Stadium; Lancaster, PA	W 29–28 ^{OT}	2,375	
November 29	Eastern*	Shadek Stadium; Lancaster, PA (NCAA Division III Second Round)	L 24–28	3,525	
*Non-conference game; ^{†}Homecoming

== Player awards ==
Star wide receiver Gary Lewis became Franklin and Marshall's first semifinalist for the Gagliardi Trophy. In addition, Lewis was named an AP Second-Team All-American, AFCA All-American, Centennial Conference Offensive Player of the Year, First-Team All-Centennial Conference, and broke the school record for receiving touchdowns.
