= Waggy, West Virginia =

Waggy
- Unincorporated community
- Location within the state of West Virginia Waggy (the United States)
- Coordinates: 38°31′35″N 80°39′10″W
- Country: United States
- State: West Virginia
- County: Braxton and Nicholas
- Elevation: 1,873 ft (571 m)
- Time zone: UTC-5 (Eastern (EST))
  - Summer (DST): UTC-4 (EDT)
- GNIS ID: 1741126

Waggy was an unincorporated community on the border of Braxton and Nicholas counties, West Virginia, United States, located just west of the Webster County line on the road from Bays to Erbacon and a logging railroad from Ramp Run. It was also known as Rose Hill.

The community was named after Henry Waggy, a businessperson in the lumber industry.
