= Peter Gallagher (American football) =

American football coach (born c. 1971)

Current position
- Title: Head coach
- Team: Ursinus
- Conference: Centennial
- Record: 138–110

Biographical details
- Born: c. 1971 (age 54–55); St. Johnsbury, Vermont, U.S.
- Education: West Virginia Wesleyan College (1993); Wagner College (1997)

Playing career
- 1989–1992: West Virginia Wesleyan
- Position: Linebacker

Coaching career (HC unless noted)
- 1993–1994: Georgetown (OLB)
- 1995–1996: Wagner (GA/DL)
- 1997: Dartmouth (DE)
- 1998–2000: Rochester (DC)
- 2001–present: Ursinus

Head coaching record
- Overall: 138–110
- Bowls: 4–3
- Tournaments: 0–1 (NCAA D-III playoffs)

Accomplishments and honors

Championships
- 1 Centennial (2010)

Awards
- All-WVAC (1992)

Peter Gallagher (born c. 1971) is an American college football coach. He is the head football coach for Ursinus College, a position he has held since 2001. He also coached for Georgetown, Wagner, Dartmouth, and Rochester. He played college football for West Virginia Wesleyan as a linebacker.

== Head coaching record ==
Year	Team	Overall	Conference	Standing	Bowl/playoffs
Ursinus Bears (Centennial Conference) (2001–present)
2001	Ursinus	6–4	3–3	T–4th	
2002	Ursinus	2–8	0–6	7th	
2003	Ursinus	3–7	0–6	7th	
2004	Ursinus	1–9	0–6	7th	
2005	Ursinus	4–6	2–4	T–5th	
2006	Ursinus	8–3	4–2	2nd	L Southwest
2007	Ursinus	7–3	5–3	T–3rd	
2008	Ursinus	3–7	2–6	7th	
2009	Ursinus	6–5	6–2	T–2nd	L Southeast
2010	Ursinus	8–2	7–2	T–1st	
2011	Ursinus	6–4	6–3	T–3rd	
2012	Ursinus	6–4	5–4	T–5th	
2013	Ursinus	7–3	6–3	T–3rd	
2014	Ursinus	7–3	6–3	3rd	
2015	Ursinus	3–7	2–7	T–8th	
2016	Ursinus	2–8	2–7	9th	
2017	Ursinus	6–4	5–4	5th	
2018	Ursinus	8–3	6–3	T–3rd	W Centennial-MAC
2019	Ursinus	5–5	4–5	T–5th	
2020–21	No team—COVID-19				
2021	Ursinus	7–4	6–3	4th	L Centennial-MAC
2022	Ursinus	9–2	7–2	3rd	W Centennial-MAC
2023	Ursinus	8–3	3–3	T–3rd	W Centennial-MAC
2024	Ursinus	9–2	5–1	2nd	L NCAA Division III First Round
2025	Ursinus	7–4	3–4	T–4th	W Centennial–MAC
2026	Ursinus	0–0	0–0		
Ursinus:		138–110	95–92		
Total:		138–110			
National championship Conference title Conference division title or championship game berth
