= Tim Keating =

Tim Keating may refer to:

- Timothy J. Keating (born 1948), retired U.S. Navy admiral
- Tim Keating (soldier), Lieutenant General and New Zealand Chief of Defence Force
- Tim Keating (American football), American college football coach
