= Michael Phelan (American football) =

American football coach

Current position
- Title: Head coach
- Team: Franklin & Marshall
- Conference: Centennial
- Record: 17–4

Playing career
- 2011–2015: St. Lawrence
- Position: Defensive back

Coaching career (HC unless noted)
- 2017–2018: Castleton (GA)
- 2019–2020: St. Lawrence (DA)
- 2021: St. Lawrence (DC)
- 2022–2024: Franklin & Marshall (DC)
- 2025–present: Franklin & Marshall

Head coaching record
- Overall: 17–4
- Tournaments: 0–1 (NCAA D-III playoffs)

Accomplishments and honors

Championships
- 1 Centennial (2025)

Michael Phelan is an American college football coach and former player. He is the head football coach for Franklin & Marshall College, a position he has held since 2025. Phelan previously served as the defensive coordinator and recruiting director at Franklin & Marshall College for three seasons from 2022 to 2024. Before coming to F&M, Phelan spent two seasons as a graduate assistant at Castleton University from 2017 to 2018 and defensive coordinator at St. Lawrence University in 2021.

In his first season at F&M, Phelan coached the Diplomats to win the 2025 Centennial Conference football championship. Earning an automatic bid from the championship win, Phelan will coach Franklin & Marshall to its first ever NCAA Division III football championship appearance.

== Playing career ==
Phelan played as a defensive back for the St. Lawrence Saints. While playing for St. Lawrence, the team was ranked top ten nationally and the defense led the nation in passing efficiency.

Phelan graduated from St. Lawrence University in 2015 with a degree in government. After St. Lawrence, Phelan attended Castleton University as graduate assistant, earning a masters degree in athletic leadership.

== Coaching career ==
=== St. Lawrence ===
Phelan returned to his alma mater in the 2019 season as a defensive assistant. In 2021, after statistical improvements in the St. Lawrence defense, Phelan was promoted to defensive coordinator and recruitment director.

=== Franklin & Marshall ===
In 2022, Phelan was hired by the Diplomats under recently-appointed head coach Tom Blumenauer as defensive coordinator and director of recruitment. As defensive coordinator, Phelan mentored 62 players onto the Centennial Conference academic honor roll. While defensive coordinator, the Diplomats defense ranked top 20 in the nation every year for passing defense efficiency.

==== 2025 season ====
On February 17, 2025, Phelan was inaugurated as the 40th head coach in Franklin & Marshall football, succeeding Blumenauer. In his first season as head coach, Phelan led the Diplomats to 9–1 in regular season play, going undefeated in the Centennial Conference. During the season, the Diplomats pulled up sets against the then-ranked Muhlenberg and Carnegie Mellon earning F&M its first bid to the conference championships since 2017. After defeating Carnegie Mellon, the Diplomats were ranked in the top 25 for the first time since 2018.

As the no. 25 ranked team, F&M entered the Centennial Conference championship against no. 3 Johns Hopkins as a heavy underdog. After the first quarter, the Diplomats trailed Johns Hopkins 0-21. However, the Diplomats rallied in the second quarter, scoring 14 unanswered points to narrow the lead to 21–14. After a touchdown pass in the third quarter, the game entered overtime tied at 21–21. After Johns Hopkins landed a touchdown and one-point conversion, the Diplomats answered with a touchdown and two-point conversion to secure the upset victory.

===== NCAA playoffs =====
The Diplomats earned an automatic bid to the NCAA Division III football championship, the first in school history. Entering the bracket as the no. 9 seed, Franklin and Marshall secured a first-round bye and a second-round home game against Eastern University Eagles.

== Head coaching record ==
Year	Team	Overall	Conference	Standing	Bowl/playoffs	D3^{#}	AFCA^{°}
Franklin & Marshall Diplomats (Centennial Conference) (2025–present)
2025	Franklin & Marshall	9–2	7–0	1st	L NCAA Division III Second Round	23	22
2026	Franklin & Marshall	8–2	5–2	2nd	2026 Centennial-MAC Bowl Series		
Franklin & Marshall:		17–4	12–2				
Total:		17–4					
National championship Conference title Conference division title or championship game berth
