= Barry H. Streeter =

American football player and coach

Barry Streeter
Biographical details
- Born: c. 1949

Playing career

Football
- c. 1970: Lebanon Valley
- Positions: Fullback, tight end

Coaching career (HC unless noted)

Football
- 1971–1972: Cumberland Valley HS (PA) (assistant)
- 1973–1974: Delaware (GA)
- 1975–1977: Gettysburg (DC)
- 1978–2003: Gettysburg
- 2005–2017: Gettysburg

Track and field
- 1976–1978: Gettysburg

Head coaching record
- Overall: 196–193–5 (football)
- Tournaments: Football; 2–1 (NCAA D-III playoffs)

Accomplishments and honors

Championships
- Football; 3 Centennial (1983–1985)

Barry H. Streeter (born c. 1949) is an American former college football coach.

Streeter grew up in Millville, New Jersey, and played football as a defensive back at Millville High School, graduating in 1967. He then attended Lebanon Valley College in Annville Township, Lebanon County, Pennsylvania, where he played as a fullback and tight end on the football team and on defense for the lacrosse team. He graduated in 1971. He received a master's degree from the University of Delaware in 1975.

In August 1975, Streeter was hired by Gettysburg College as an assistant football coach, head track coach, and an instructor in the physical education department. He became Gettysburg's head football coach in February 1978. He remained as the head coach for 39 years through the 2017 season, compiling a 196–193–5 record.

== Head coaching record ==
=== Football ===
Year	Team	Overall	Conference	Standing	Bowl/playoffs
Gettysburg Bullets (Middle Atlantic Conference) (1978–1982)
1978	Gettysburg	5–5	3–3	5th (Southern)	
1979	Gettysburg	5–6	4–4	T–5th (Southern)	
1980	Gettysburg	6–3–1	4–3–1	4th (Southern)	
1981	Gettysburg	6–4	5–3	T–4th (Southern)	
1982	Gettysburg	7–3	6–2	T–3rd (Southern)	
Gettysburg Bullets (Centennial Conference) (1983–2003)
1983	Gettysburg	8–2	5–2	T–1st	
1984	Gettysburg	8–2	6–1	T–2nd	
1985	Gettysburg	11–1–1	6–0–1	1st	L NCAA Division III Semifinal
1986	Gettysburg	6–4	5–2	3rd	
1987	Gettysburg	7–3	4–3	4th	
1988	Gettysburg	4–6	4–3	4th	
1989	Gettysburg	2–7–1	2–4–1	6th	
1990	Gettysburg	4–5–1	4–3	T–4th	
1991	Gettysburg	2–7	2–5	T–4th	
1992	Gettysburg	6–4	4–3	T–3rd	
1993	Gettysburg	5–5	4–3	T–3rd	
1994	Gettysburg	8–2	6–1	2nd	
1995	Gettysburg	5–4–1	3–3–1	5th	
1996	Gettysburg	3–7	3–4	T–4th	
1997	Gettysburg	4–6	2–5	6th	
1998	Gettysburg	3–7	2–5	T–6th	
1999	Gettysburg	3–7	2–5	6th	
2000	Gettysburg	1–9	1–6	7th	
2001	Gettysburg	4–6	1–5	6th	
2002	Gettysburg	4–6	1–5	6th	
2003	Gettysburg	5–5	2–4	T–5th	
Gettysburg Bullets (Centennial Conference) (2005–2017)
2005	Gettysburg	4–6	3–3	T–3rd	
2006	Gettysburg	5–5	3–3	T–3rd	
2007	Gettysburg	6–5	5–3	T–3rd	
2008	Gettysburg	5–5	5–3	T–4th	
2009	Gettysburg	3–7	3–5	T–5th	
2010	Gettysburg	6–4	5–4	T–5th	
2011	Gettysburg	6–4	6–3	T–3rd	
2012	Gettysburg	7–3	6–3	T–3rd	
2013	Gettysburg	4–6	3–6	T–6th	
2014	Gettysburg	5–5	5–4	T–4th	
2015	Gettysburg	7–3	6–3	4th	
2016	Gettysburg	3–7	3–6	T–6th	
2017	Gettysburg	3–7	3–6	T–6th	
Gettysburg:		196–193–5	147–139–4		
Total:		196–193–5			
National championship Conference title Conference division title or championship game berth
