= Waggy =

Waggy may refer to:

- Waggy, West Virginia, a former community
- "Waggy", a Blink-182 song from Dude Ranch (album) and They Came to Conquer... Uranus EP
- "Waggy", nickname of Danni Wyatt (born 1991), English cricketer
