= Alan Holman =

Alan Holman may refer to:

- Alan M. Holman (1904–1994), American football player and coach of football and basketball
- J. Alan Holman (1931–2006), American paleontologist and herpetologist
