= Darwin Breaux =

American football, golf, and wrestling coach (born 1955)

Biographical details
- Born: May 8, 1955 (age 70)

Playing career

Football
- c. 1975: West Chester

Golf
- c. 1975: West Chester

Coaching career (HC unless noted)

Football
- c. 1985: Gettysburg (assistant)
- 1989–1992: Dickinson (OC)
- 1993–2016: Dickinson

Golf
- c. 1985: Gettysburg
- 2000–present: Dickinson

Wrestling
- c. 1985: Gettysburg

Head coaching record
- Overall: 131–113–1 (football)
- Bowls: 2–1
- Tournaments: Football; 0–2 (NCAA D-III playoffs)

Accomplishments and honors

Championships
- Football; 4 Centennial (1993–1994, 2004, 2006)

Awards
- Football; AFCA South Region Coach of The Year (1994)

Darwin Breaux (born May 8, 1955) is an American football, golf, and wrestling coach.

== Biography ==
Breaux is the head men's golf coach at Dickinson College, a position he has held since 2000. He served as the head football coach at Dickinson from 1993 to 2016, and was the thirty-fourth person to take that post; several coaches have held the post twice.

Breaux joined the Dickinson football staff in 1989 as offensive coordinator and took over the head coaching position in 1993. His 1994 team put together a school record 10–0 regular season and earned an NCAA Playoff appearance and was named the AFCA South Region Coach of The Year.

Breaux also coaches the Dickinson men's golf team, a perennial Centennial Conference powerhouse.

== Head coaching record ==
=== Football ===
Year	Team	Overall	Conference	Standing	Bowl/playoffs
Dickinson Red Devils (Centennial Conference) (1993–2016)
1993	Dickinson	7–4	5–2	T–1st	L ECAC Southwest Bowl
1994	Dickinson	10–1	7–0	1st	L NCAA Division III First Round
1995	Dickinson	7–2–1	5–1–1	2nd	
1996	Dickinson	5–5	3–4	T–4th	
1997	Dickinson	7–3	6–1	2nd	
1998	Dickinson	8–3	5–2	T–2nd	W ECAC Southwest Bowl
1999	Dickinson	6–4	4–3	T–3rd	
2000	Dickinson	5–5	4–3	T–4th	
2001	Dickinson	5–5	3–3	T–4th	
2002	Dickinson	5–5	3–3	4th	
2003	Dickinson	4–6	2–4	T–5th	
2004	Dickinson	6–4	4–2	T–1st	
2005	Dickinson	4–6	3–3	T–3rd	
2006	Dickinson	8–3	5–1	1st	L NCAA Division III First Round
2007	Dickinson	9–2	6–2	2nd	W ECAC Southeast Bowl
2008	Dickinson	6–4	5–3	T–4th	
2009	Dickinson	8–2	6–2	T–2nd	
2010	Dickinson	3–7	3–6	T–4th	
2011	Dickinson	4–6	4–5	6th	
2012	Dickinson	4–6	4–5	7th	
2013	Dickinson	3–7	3–6	T–6th	
2014	Dickinson	3–7	3–6	8th	
2015	Dickinson	3–7	3–6	7th	
2016	Dickinson	1–9	1–8	10th	
Dickinson:		131–113–1	97–81–1		
Total:		131–113–1			
National championship Conference title Conference division title or championship game berth
