= Greg Chimera =

American football coach

Biographical details
- Born: Gaithersburg, Maryland, USA

Playing career
- 2005–2008: Johns Hopkins
- Position: Fullback

Coaching career (HC unless noted)
- 2009–2012: Johns Hopkins (RB/TE)
- 2013: Johns Hopkins (WR)
- 2014–2018: Johns Hopkins (OC)
- 2019–2023: Johns Hopkins
- 2024–2025: Penn (OC/QB)

Head coaching record
- Overall: 40–7
- Bowls: 2–0
- Tournaments: 3–2 (NCAA D-III playoffs)

Accomplishments and honors

Championships
- 2 Centennial (2021, 2023)

Gregory Chimera is an American college football coach. He was most recently the offensive coordinator and quarterbacks coach for the University of Pennsylvania, positions he held from 2024 through 2025. He was the head football coach at Johns Hopkins University from 2019 to 2023.

== Personal life and education ==
Chimera was born in Gaithersburg, Maryland, and attended Quince Orchard High School. After Quince Orchard, he graduated from Johns Hopkins University (JHU) in 2009 with his degree in psychological and brain sciences with a minor in entrepreneurship and management. During his time at JHU, he was a fullback for the Johns Hopkins Blue Jays football team. Prior to graduating, he was inducted into the National Football Foundation's Hampshire Honor Society.

== Career ==
Immediately following graduation, Chimera returned to his alma mater as a running backs and tight ends coach. In 2014, he was promoted to serve as the team's offensive coordinator. Following the passing of Jim Margraff in 2019, Chimera was appointed interim head coach of Johns Hopkins Blue Jays football. On February 22, 2019, Chimera was officially promoted to the 27th head coach in school history. In his debut game as head coach, the Blue Jays beat the Randolph–Macon Yellow Jackets 17–12, making him the first JHU head coach in 99 years to earn a win in his debut. Chimera guided the Blue Jays to an 8–3 record in his first season, the most wins ever recorded by a first-year Johns Hopkins coach. Over his four seasons as head coach, Chimera led the Blue Jays to a 40–7 record, two Centennial Conference titles, and two NCAA DIII playoff series. His .851 winning percentage is the highest in program history, and his 40 wins rank third in program history. He left Johns Hopkins in January 2024 to become the offensive coordinator and quarterbacks coach for the University of Pennsylvania.

== Head coaching record ==
Year	Team	Overall	Conference	Standing	Bowl/playoffs	AFCA^{#}	D3^{°}
Johns Hopkins Blue Jays (Centennial Conference) (2019–2023)
2019	Johns Hopkins	8–3	6–3	3rd	W Centennial-MAC Bowl Series		
2020–21	No team—COVID-19						
2021	Johns Hopkins	10–2	8–1	T–1st	L NCAA Division III Second Round	13	14
2022	Johns Hopkins	10–1	8–1	2nd	W Centennial-MAC Bowl Series	21	21
2023	Johns Hopkins	12–1	6–0	1st	L NCAA Division III Quarterfinals	8	8
Johns Hopkins:		40–7	28–5				
Total:		40–7					
National championship Conference title Conference division title or championship game berth
