= Tom Gilburg =

American football player and coach (born 1938)

No. 73
- Positions: Offensive tackle, punter

Personal information
- Born: November 27, 1938 (age 87); Bronxville, New York, U.S.
- Listed height: 6 ft 5 in (1.96 m)
- Listed weight: 245 lb (111 kg)

Career information
- High school: Horace Greeley (Chappaqua, New York)
- College: Syracuse
- NFL draft: 1961: 2nd round, 21st overall pick
- AFL draft: 1961: 3rd round, 18th overall pick

Career history

Playing
- Baltimore Colts (1961–1965)

Coaching
- Football: Hofstra (1966-1970) Assistant coach; Lehigh (1971-1974) Linebackers coach; Franklin & Marshall (1975-2002) Head coach; Lacrosse: Lehigh (1972-1975) Head coach

Awards and highlights
- National championship (1959); 5× Centennial Conference championship (1986-1988, 1993, 1995); MAC Southern Division championship (1976)

Career NFL statistics
- Punts: 232
- Punting yards: 9,606
- Longest punt: 66
- Stats at Pro Football Reference

Head coaching record
- Career: Football: 160–112–2 (.588); Lacrosse: 21–26–0 (.447)

Thomas deMagnin Gilburg (born November 27, 1938) is an American former professional football player and coach. He was a punter and second-string offensive tackle for the Baltimore Colts of the National Football League (NFL) from 1961 to 1965.

Gilburg played college football for the Syracuse Orange before being selected by the Colts in the second round of the 1961 NFL draft with the 21st overall pick. He was the head football coach at Franklin & Marshall College in Lancaster, Pennsylvania for 28 seasons, from 1975 until 2002, compiling a record of 160–112–2.

== Head coaching record ==
=== Football ===
Year	Team	Overall	Conference	Standing	Bowl/playoffs
Franklin & Marshall Diplomats (Middle Atlantic Conference) (1975–1982)
1975	Franklin & Marshall	7–2	6–2	T–2nd (Southern)	
1976	Franklin & Marshall	8–1	8–1	1st (Southern)	
1977	Franklin & Marshall	8–1	7–1	2nd (Southern)	
1978	Franklin & Marshall	7–2	6–2	3rd (Southern)	
1979	Franklin & Marshall	7–2	6–2	T–2nd (Southern)	
1980	Franklin & Marshall	7–2	6–2	3rd (Southern)	
1981	Franklin & Marshall	6–3	5–3	T–4th	
1982	Franklin & Marshall	7–2	6–2	T–3rd (Southern)	
Franklin & Marshall Diplomats (Centennial Conference) (1983–2002)
1983	Franklin & Marshall	5–4	4–3	4th	
1984	Franklin & Marshall	5–4	4–3	4th	
1985	Franklin & Marshall	7–2–1	5–1–1	2nd	
1986	Franklin & Marshall	8–3	6–1	T–1st	L ECAC Southern Championship
1987	Franklin & Marshall	9–1–1	7–0	1st	W ECAC Southern Championship
1988	Franklin & Marshall	7–3	6–1	T–1st	
1989	Franklin & Marshall	10–1	6–1	2nd	W ECAC Southwest Championship
1990	Franklin & Marshall	3–7	2–5	T–6th	
1991	Franklin & Marshall	6–4	5–2	2nd	
1992	Franklin & Marshall	5–5	3–4	6th	
1993	Franklin & Marshall	6–4	5–2	T–1st	
1994	Franklin & Marshall	1–9	0–7	8th	
1995	Franklin & Marshall	7–3	6–1	1st	
1996	Franklin & Marshall	9–2	6–1	2nd	L ECAC South Championship
1997	Franklin & Marshall	4–6	4–3	4th	
1998	Franklin & Marshall	4–6	4–3	4th	
1999	Franklin & Marshall	2–8	1–6	7th	
2000	Franklin & Marshall	0–10	0–7	8th	
2001	Franklin & Marshall	1–9	0–6	7th	
2002	Franklin & Marshall	4–6	2–4	5th	
Franklin & Marshall:		160–112–2	126–76–1		
Total:		160–112–2			
National championship Conference title Conference division title or championship game berth
