= Tim Keating (American football) =

Playing career
- 1971–1974: Bethany (WV)

Coaching career (HC unless noted)
- 1978–1979: Georgetown (assistant)
- 1980–1981: DePauw (assistant)
- 1982–1985: Penn (assistant)
- 1986–1987: Rice (assistant)
- 1988–1992: Wesley (DE)
- 1993–2011: McDaniel
- 2013–2015: Stetson (ST/WR/TE)
- 2016: Stetson (volunteer)

Head coaching record
- Overall: 136–106–3 (college)
- Tournaments: 2–5 (NCAA D-III playoffs)

Accomplishments and honors

Championships
- 7 Centennial (1997–2002, 2004)

Tim Keating is an American former college football coach and player. He was currently a volunteer assistant at Stetson University. He was the head football coach at the Wesley College in Dover, Delaware, a position he has held since the 1988 to 1992.

From 1993 to 2011, Keating served as the head coach at McDaniel College, winning over 100 games and becoming the program's winningest coach.

== Head coaching record ==
=== College ===
Year	Team	Overall	Conference	Standing	Bowl/playoffs
Wesley Wolverines (NCAA Division III independent) (1988–1992)
1988	Wesley	1–8			
1989	Wesley	4–5			
1990	Wesley	5–5			
1991	Wesley	9–2			W ECAC Southeast Bowl
1992	Wesley	7–3			
Wesley:		26–23			
Western Maryland / McDaniel Green Terror (Centennial) (1993–2011)
1993	Western Maryland	3–5–1	2–5	T–6th	
1994	Western Maryland	5–4	4–3	T–3rd	
1995	Western Maryland	5–3–2	3–2–2	4th	
1996	Western Maryland	4–6	3–4	T–4th	
1997	Western Maryland	10–1	7–0	1st	L NCAA Division III First Round
1998	Western Maryland	10–1	7–0	1st	L NCAA Division III First Round
1999	Western Maryland	11–1	7–0	1st	L NCAA Division III Second Round
2000	Western Maryland	10–2	7–0	1st	L NCAA Division III Second Round
2001	Western Maryland	8–3	5–1	T–1st	L NCAA Division III First Round
2002	McDaniel	9–2	5–1	T–1st	
2003	McDaniel	5–5	4–2	3rd	
2004	McDaniel	6–4	4–2	T–1st	
2003	McDaniel	5–5	2–4	T–5th	
2006	McDaniel	4–6	2–4	T–5th	
2007	McDaniel	1–9	1–7	8th	
2008	McDaniel	2–8	1–7	T–9th	
2009	McDaniel	5–5	3–5	T–5th	
2010	McDaniel	5–5	4–5	7th	
2011	McDaniel	2–8	2–7	T–8th	
Western Maryland / McDaniel:		110–83–3	73–59–2		
Total:		136–106–3			
National championship Conference title Conference division title or championship game berth

== See also ==
- List of college football coaches with 100 losses
