= Tom Blumenauer =

American football coach (born c. 1985)

Current position
- Title: Head coach
- Team: Cortland
- Conference: Empire 8
- Record: 18–3

Biographical details
- Born: c. 1984 (age 41–42); Brentwood, New York, U.S.
- Education: Ithaca College (2007)

Playing career
- 2003–2004: Connecticut
- 2005–2006: Ithaca
- Positions: Free safety, linebacker

Coaching career (HC unless noted)
- 2007: Ithaca (SA)
- 2008–2009: Anna Howard Shaw Junior HS (PA) (JV)
- 2010–2011: St. Lawrence (WR)
- 2012–2013: St. Lawrence (QB)
- 2014: Endicott (OC/QB)
- 2015: Bowdoin (OC/QB)
- 2016–2020: Williams (OL)
- 2021: Williams (OC/QB)
- 2022–2024: Franklin & Marshall
- 2025–present: Cortland

Head coaching record
- Overall: 39–14
- Bowls: 2–0
- Tournaments: 0–1 (NCAA D-III playoffs)

Accomplishments and honors

Championships
- 2 Empire 8 (2025, 2026)

Awards
- 2 Empire 8 Coaching Staff of the Year (2025, 2026)

Tom Blumenauer (born c. 1985) is an American college football coach. He is the head football coach for State University of New York at Cortland, a position he has held since 2025. He previously served as the head football coach for Franklin & Marshall College from 2022 to 2024. He also coached for Ithaca, Anna Howard Shaw Junior High School, St. Lawrence, Endicott, Bowdoin, and Williams.

Blumenauer played college football for Connecticut and Ithaca as a free safety and linebacker.

== Head coaching record ==
Year	Team	Overall	Conference	Standing	Bowl/playoffs	AFCA^{#}
Franklin & Marshall Diplomats (Centennial Conference) (2022–2024)
2022	Franklin & Marshall	6–4	5–4	5th		
2023	Franklin & Marshall	8–3	3–3	T–3rd	W Centennial–MAC	
2024	Franklin & Marshall	7–4	3–3	4th	W Centennial–MAC	
Franklin & Marshall:		21–11	11–10			
Cortland Red Dragons (Empire 8) (2025–present)
2025	Cortland	8–3	7–0	1st	L NCAA Division III First Round	22
2026	Cortland	10–0	7–0	1st		
Cortland:		18–3	14–0			
Total:		39–14				
National championship Conference title Conference division title or championship game berth
