= Jim Margraff =

American football player and coach (1960–2019)

Biographical details
- Born: April 18, 1960
- Died: January 2, 2019 (aged 58); Baltimore, Maryland, U.S.

Playing career
- 1978–1981: Johns Hopkins
- Position: Quarterback

Coaching career (HC unless noted)
- 1982: Johns Hopkins (QB)
- 1983–1984: Miller Place HS (NY) (OB/DB)
- 1985–1986: Albany (OL)
- 1987: Penn (TE)
- 1988: Rochester (OL)
- 1989: Columbia (OL)
- 1990–2018: Johns Hopkins

Head coaching record
- Overall: 221–89–3
- Bowls: 4–1
- Tournaments: 9–10 (NCAA D-III playoffs)

Accomplishments and honors

Championships
- 14 Centennial (2002–2005, 2009–2018)

Awards
- AFCA NCAA Division III COY (2018); 4× Centennial Coach of the Year (2011–2012, 2014, 2016); D3football.com National COY (2018)
- College Football Hall of Fame; Inducted in 2026 (profile)

James Frederic Margraff III (April 18, 1960 – January 2, 2019) was an American football coach. He served as the head football coach at Johns Hopkins University from 1990 to 2018, compiling a record of 221–89–3. Margraff died suddenly of a heart attack on January 2, 2019.

== Head coaching record ==
Year	Team	Overall	Conference	Standing	Bowl/playoffs
Johns Hopkins Blue Jays (Centennial Conference) (1990–2018)
1990	Johns Hopkins	5–4–1	4–2–1	3rd	
1991	Johns Hopkins	5–4–1	3–4	T–4th	
1992	Johns Hopkins	6–4	4–3	T–3rd	
1993	Johns Hopkins	4–6	2–5	T–6th	
1994	Johns Hopkins	4–6	4–3	T–3rd	
1995	Johns Hopkins	6–3–1	4–2–1	3rd	
1996	Johns Hopkins	7–3	5–2	3rd	
1997	Johns Hopkins	7–3	5–2	3rd	
1998	Johns Hopkins	7–3	5–2	T–2nd	
1999	Johns Hopkins	4–6	3–4	5th	
2000	Johns Hopkins	5–5	4–3	T–4th	
2001	Johns Hopkins	6–3	4–2	3rd	
2002	Johns Hopkins	9–2	5–1	T–1st	W ECAC Southwest Bowl
2003	Johns Hopkins	10–1	5–1	T–1st	W ECAC South Atlantic Bowl
2004	Johns Hopkins	9–2	4–2	T–1st	W ECAC Southeast Bowl
2005	Johns Hopkins	8–3	5–1	1st	L NCAA Division III First Round
2006	Johns Hopkins	5–5	3–3	T–3rd	
2007	Johns Hopkins	4–6	3–5	7th	
2008	Johns Hopkins	8–3	6–2	T–2nd	L ECAC Southeast Bowl
2009	Johns Hopkins	10–3	7–1	1st	L NCAA Division III Quarterfinal
2010	Johns Hopkins	8–3	7–2	T–1st	W ECAC South Atlantic Bowl
2011	Johns Hopkins	10–1	9–0	1st	L NCAA Division III First Round
2012	Johns Hopkins	10–2	8–1	1st	L NCAA Division III Second Round
2013	Johns Hopkins	10–1	9–0	1st	L NCAA Division III First Round
2014	Johns Hopkins	11–1	9–0	1st	L NCAA Division III Second Round
2015	Johns Hopkins	11–1	9–0	1st	L NCAA Division III Second Round
2016	Johns Hopkins	11–1	9–0	1st	L NCAA Division III Second Round
2017	Johns Hopkins	9–2	8–1	T–1st	L NCAA Division III First Round
2018	Johns Hopkins	12–2	8–1	T–1st	L NCAA Division III Semifinal
Johns Hopkins:		221–89–3	161–55–2		
Total:		221–89–3			
National championship Conference title Conference division title or championship game berth

== See also ==
- List of college football career coaching wins leaders
