= Ward W. Reese =

American football coach and reverend

Biographical details
- Born: February 12, 1870; Lancaster County, Pennsylvania, U.S.
- Died: August 17, 1927 (aged 57); Bowling Green, Kentucky, U.S.

Coaching career (HC unless noted)
- 1895: Franklin & Marshall

Head coaching record
- Overall: 3–5–1

Ward Winter Reese (February 12, 1870 – August 17, 1927) was an American college football coach and reverend of the Episcopal Church. He served as the head football at the Franklin & Marshall College in Lancaster, Pennsylvania in 1895, compiling a record of 3–5–1.

Reese was a graduate of the University of Pennsylvania and attended Harvard Divinity School. He served as archdeacon of the Episcopal Diocese of Utah and rector of St. Paul's Episcopal Church in Salt Lake City and was later rector of Christ Church in Bowling Green, Kentucky. Reese died on August 17, 1927, in Bowling Green.

== Head coaching record ==
Year	Team	Overall	Conference	Standing	Bowl/playoffs
Franklin & Marshall (Independent) (1895)
1895	Franklin & Marshall	3–5–1			
Franklin & Marshall:		3–5–1			
Total:		3–5–1			
