= John Moiseichik =

American basketball player (1920–2016)

Personal information
- Born: June 5, 1920 Cortland, New York, U.S.
- Died: April 16, 2016 (aged 95) Groton, New York, U.S.
- Listed height: 5 ft 11 in (1.80 m)
- Listed weight: 180 lb (82 kg)

Career information
- High school: Cortland (Cortland, New York)
- College: Cortland (1940–1943, 1945–1946)
- Playing career: 1946–1947
- Position: Guard

Career history
- 1946–1947: Syracuse Nationals

Career NBL statistics
- Games played: 9
- Points: 16 (1.8 ppg)

John Stephen Moiseichik (June 5, 1920 – April 16, 2016) was an American professional basketball player. He played in the National Basketball League for the Syracuse Nationals during the 1946–47 season and averaged 1.8 points per game. At SUNY Cortland he played on both the football and basketball teams.
