= David Pooley =

American football coach

Biographical details
- Born: May 30, 1936 (age 90)

Coaching career (HC unless noted)
- 1967: Franklin & Marshall (assistant)
- 1968–1970: Franklin & Marshall

Head coaching record
- Overall: 10–14

Accomplishments and honors

Championships
- 1 MAC Southern College Division (1968)

David W. Pooley (born May 30, 1936) is an American former college football coach. He served as the head football coach at Franklin & Marshall College in Lancaster, Pennsylvania for three seasons, from 1968 to 1970, compiling a record of 10–14.

== Head coaching record ==
Year	Team	Overall	Conference	Standing	Bowl/playoffs
Franklin & Marshall Diplomats (Middle Atlantic Conference) (1968–1970)
1968	Franklin & Marshall	6–2	6–1	T–1st (Southern College)	
1969	Franklin & Marshall	1–7	1–6	T–9th (Southern College)	
1970	Franklin & Marshall	3–5	3–4	T–7th (Southern)	
Franklin & Marshall:		10–14	10–11		
Total:		10–14			
National championship Conference title Conference division title or championship game berth
