= Vere Triechler =

American football coach

Biographical details
- Born: June 5, 1879; Elizabethtown, Pennsylvania, U.S.
- Died: April 28, 1947 (aged 67); Elizabethtown, Pennsylvania, U.S.

Coaching career (HC unless noted)
- 1907: Franklin & Marshall

Head coaching record
- Overall: 4–6

Vere Triechler (June 5, 1879 – April 28, 1947) was an American college football coach and physician. He served as the head football coach at Franklin & Marshall College in Lancaster, Pennsylvania for one season, in 1907, compiling a record of 4–6.

Triechler died of a heart attack on April 28, 1947.

== Head coaching record ==
Year	Team	Overall	Conference	Standing	Bowl/playoffs
Franklin & Marshall (Independent) (1907)
1907	Franklin & Marshall	4–6			
Franklin & Marshall:		4–6			
Total:		4–6			
