= Erbacon, West Virginia =

Unincorporated community in West Virginia, United States

Erbacon
- Unincorporated community
- Location within the state of West Virginia Erbacon (the United States)
- Coordinates: 38°31′8″N 80°35′20″W
- Country: United States
- State: West Virginia
- County: Webster
- Time zone: UTC-5 (Eastern (EST))
  - Summer (DST): UTC-4 (EDT)
- ZIP code: 26203
- Area codes: 304 and 681
- GNIS feature ID: 1538734

Erbacon is a small unincorporated community and coal town in Webster County, West Virginia, United States. The town's namesake was a prominent investor, E.R. Bacon, who owned much of the land surrounding what is now Erbacon during the early 20th century. The village was established primarily around the railroad, and today is considered remote.

The population of Erbacon in 1901 was 235. By 1916, its population was 194 which was Webster County's second largest village at the time (second to Skyles).

The West Virginia and Pittsburgh Railroad connected through Erbacon through at least the late 1890s. The Erbacon and Summersville Railroad was established in 1911 and ran for approximately 15 miles and was connected with the Baltimore and Ohio's Richwood Branch. It was primarily used to transport lumber between Erbacon to the Davis-Eakin Lumber Company located in Nicholas County. By the 1920s, the main industries were mining, logging, and farming.

There were a number of old-time fiddle players from Erbacon, with the most famous fiddle player of this style being Lewis Johnson "Uncle Jack" McElwain (1856–1938) who played in the "old West Fork style." McElwain was known locally for having entered and won a fiddling contest at the 1893 World's Fair in Chicago.

The village also had the "Ice Cream Bear" which was a black bear owned by a resident, Lindsay Rose (who died in 1912). Erbacon residents recalled seeing the bear accompanying Rose as he traveled through the village selling ice cream.
