= Bays, West Virginia =

Unincorporated community in West Virginia, United States

Bays
- Unincorporated community
- Location within the state of West Virginia
- Coordinates: 38°31′45″N 80°42′58″W
- Country: United States
- State: West Virginia
- County: Nicholas
- Elevation: 1,598 ft (487 m)
- Time zone: UTC-5 (Eastern (EST))
  - Summer (DST): UTC-4 (EDT)
- GNIS feature ID: 1535322

Bays is a settlement in Nicholas County, West Virginia, United States on the border of Braxton and Webster Counties. It is at the intersection of Mill Creek Road and Old Turnpike Road. Its post office has been closed.
