= Cortland Red Dragons football =

American football team of SUNY Cortland

- First season: 1893; 133 years ago
- Athletic director: Mike Urtz
- Head coach: Tom Blumenauer; 1st season, 8–3 (.727)
- Location: Cortland, New York
- Stadium: James J. Grady '50, M '61 Field at the SUNY Cortland Stadium Complex (Grady Field) (capacity: 6,500)
- NCAA division: Division III
- Conference: Empire 8
- Colors: Red and white
- All-time record: 499–339–27 (.592)
- Bowl record: 5–8 (.385)

NCAA Division III championships
- 2023

Conference championships
- 13
- Rivalries: Ithaca Bombers (rivalry)
- Website: cortlandreddragons.com

The Cortland Red Dragons football program is the intercollegiate American football team for the State University of New York at Cortland. The team competes in the NCAA Division III, and is a member of the Empire 8. The team plays its home games at James J. Grady '50, M '61 Field at the SUNY Cortland Stadium Complex or Grady Field for short in Cortland, New York. The Red Dragons are led by Tom Blumenauer, who has served as head coach since 2025. The Red Dragons won their first NCAA Division III national championship in 2023.

== Year-by-year results ==
Statistics correct as of the end of the 2025–26 college football season

NCAA Division III playoff berth	National champion	Conference champion	Division champion	Undefeated season

Year	NCAA Division	Conference	Conference division	Coach	Overall					Conference						Final ranking
Year	NCAA Division	Conference	Conference division	Coach	Games	Win	Loss	Tie	Pct.	Games	Win	Loss	Tie	Pct.	Standing	Final ranking
2007	III	NJAC	—	Dan MacNeill	11	8	3	0	.727	7	6	1	0	.857	T–1st	—
2008	III	NJAC	—	Dan MacNeill	13	11	2	0	.846	9	9	0	0	1.000	1st	6
2009	III	NJAC	—	Dan MacNeill	11	0 (7)*	4	0	.000	9	0 (7)*	2	0	.000	3rd	—
2010	III	NJAC	—	Dan MacNeill	12	10	2	0	.833	9	8	1	0	.889	T–1st	18
2011	III	NJAC	—	Dan MacNeill	11	9	2	0	.818	9	7	2	0	.778	T–2nd	—
2012	III	NJAC	—	Dan MacNeill	11	9	2	0	.818	7	7	0	0	1.000	1st	24
2013	III	NJAC	—	Dan MacNeill	11	6	5	0	.545	7	5	2	0	.714	3rd	—
2014	III	NJAC	—	Dan MacNeill	10	5	5	0	.500	7	4	3	0	.571	4th	—
2015	III	Empire 8	—	Dan MacNeill	12	9	3	0	.750	8	6	2	0	.750	T–1st	15
2016	III	Empire 8	—	Dan MacNeill	11	5	6	0	.455	8	3	5	0	.375	T–6th	—
2017	III	Empire 8	—	Dan MacNeill	11	7	4	0	.636	7	5	2	0	.714	T–2nd	—
2018	III	Empire 8	—	Dan MacNeill	10	7	3	0	.700	7	5	2	0	.714	2nd	—
2019	III	Empire 8	—	Dan MacNeill	11	8	3	0	.727	6	5	1	0	.833	T–1st	—
2021	III	Empire 8	—	Curt Fitzpatrick	12	11	1	0	.917	6	6	0	0	1.000	1st	16
2022	III	Empire 8	—	Curt Fitzpatrick	11	9	2	0	.818	6	6	0	0	1.000	1st	19
2023	III	Empire 8	—	Curt Fitzpatrick	15	14	1	0	.933	7	7	0	0	1.000	1st	1
2024	III	Empire 8	—	Curt Fitzpatrick	12	11	1	0	.917	7	7	0	0	1.000	1st	2
2025	III	Empire 8	—	Tom Blumenauer	11	8	3	0	.727	7	7	0	0	1.000	1st	22
	Totals				206	147*	52	0	.739	133	103*	23	0	.817		

* All seven wins from the 2009 season were later vacated by the NCAA.

== Postseason appearances ==
=== NCAA Division III playoffs ===
The Red Dragons have made fourteen appearances in the NCAA Division III playoffs, with a combined record of 13–13 and one national championship.

Year	Round	Opponent	Result
1988	First Round; Second Round	Hofstra; Ithaca	W, 32–17; L, 17–24
1989	First Round	Union (NY)	L, 14–42
1990	First Round	Hofstra	L, 9–35
1997	First Round	TCNJ	L, 30–34
2005	First Round	Hobart	L, 22–23
2008	First Round; Second Round; Quarterfinals	Plymouth State; Curry; Mount Union	W, 31–14; W, 42–0; L, 14–41
2010	First Round; Second Round	Endicott; Alfred	W, 49–35; L, 20–34
2012	First Round; Second Round	Framingham State; Wesley	W, 20–19; L, 6–56
2015	First Round; Second Round	Salisbury; Linfield	W, 45–21; L, 22–38
2021	First Round; Second Round	Springfield; RPI	W, 26–21; L, 14–21
2022	First Round	Randolph–Macon	L, 28–35
2023	First Round; Second Round; Quarterfinals; Semifinals; Stagg Bowl	Endicott; Grove City; Alma; Randolph–Macon; North Central (IL)	W, 23–17; W, 25–24; W, 58–41; W, 49–14; W, 38–37
2024	Second Round; Third Round	Endicott; Springfield	W, 17–9; L, 28–40
2025	First Round	Springfield	L, 7–21

== Notable former players ==
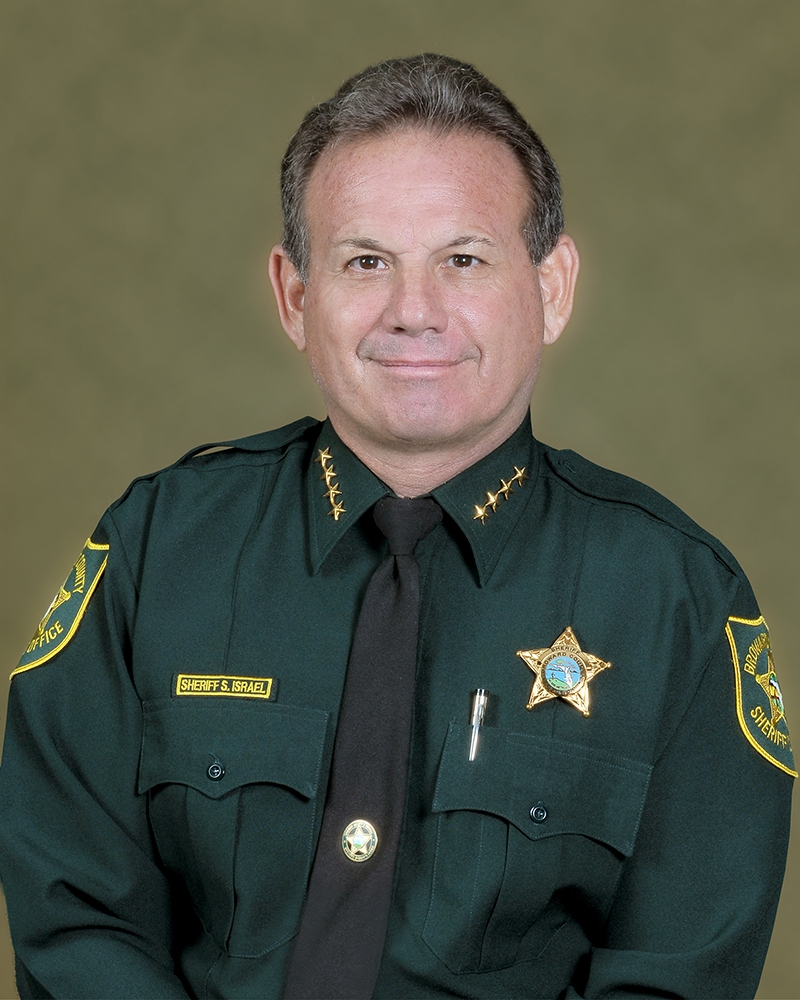
Scott Israel

- Bob Bateson (1983), retired CFL & Italian Football League linebacker, current associate head coach of the Buffalo eXtreme
- Jake Ceresna (2016), NFL & CFL defensive end
- Scott Israel (BA, 1977), quarterback, former sheriff of Broward County, Florida, current police chief of Opa-locka, Florida.
- Kevin James, actor and comedian
- Ryan McCarthy (2002), head football coach at Central Connecticut University
- John Moiseichik (1946), professional basketball player in the National Basketball League
- Craig Peterson (2010), American football placekicker in the Indoor Football League
- Dan Pitcher (2011), NFL coach
- R-Kal Truluck (1997), NFL defensive end for the Kansas City Chiefs, Green Bay Packers, and Arizona Cardinals
