= Skyles, West Virginia =

Skyles
- Unincorporated community
- Location within the state of West Virginia Skyles (the United States)
- Coordinates: 38°30′14″N 80°40′40″W
- Country: United States
- State: West Virginia
- County: Webster
- Elevation: 1,250 ft (380 m)
- Time zone: UTC-5 (Eastern (EST))
  - Summer (DST): UTC-4 (EDT)
- GNIS ID: 1727913

Skyles was an unincorporated community in Webster County, West Virginia.

The community takes its name from nearby Skyles Creek.
