= Skyles Creek =

Stream in the American state of West Virginia

Coordinates: 38°30′14″N 80°40′40″W

Skyles Creek is a stream in the U.S. state of West Virginia.

Skyles Creek was named after a government surveyor.

== See also ==
- List of rivers of West Virginia
