= 2002 NCAA Division III football season =

American college football season

- Regular season: August – November 2002
- Playoffs: November – December 2002
- National championship: Salem Football Stadium; Salem, VA
- Champion: Mount Union (7)
- Gagliardi Trophy: Dan Pugh (RB), Mount Union

The 2002 NCAA Division III football season, part of the college football season organized by the NCAA at the Division III level in the United States, began in August 2002, and concluded with the NCAA Division III Football Championship, also known as the Stagg Bowl, in December 2002 at Salem Football Stadium in Salem, Virginia. The Mount Union Purple Raiders won their seventh, and third consecutive, Division III championship by defeating the Trinity (TX) Tigers, 48−7.

The Gagliardi Trophy, given to the most outstanding player in Division III football, was awarded to Dan Pugh, running back from Mount Union.

== Conference changes and new programs ==
=== Name changes ===
- Before the start of the season, Western Maryland College changed its name to McDaniel College. Its football program thus changed from the Western Maryland Green Terror to the McDaniel Green Terror. The team remained a member of the Centennial Conference.

== Conference standings ==
2002 American Southwest Conference football standings
	Conf.			Overall
Team	W		L	W		L
Mary Hardin–Baylor $^	9	–	0	10	–	1
Howard Payne	8	–	1	9	–	1
Hardin–Simmons	7	–	2	8	–	2
East Texas Baptist	6	–	3	6	–	4
Mississippi College	4	–	5	4	–	6
Austin *	4	–	5	4	–	6
Louisiana College	3	–	6	4	–	6
Texas Lutheran	2	–	7	2	–	8
McMurry *	0	–	9	0	–	10
Sul Ross *	2	–	7	2	–	8
$ – Conference champion; ^ – NCAA Division III playoff participant; * – Sul Ross forfeited wins over Austin and McMurry for use of ineligible player, but season records stood.

2002 Atlantic Central Football Conference standings
	Conf.			Overall
Team	W		L	W		L
Frostburg State $	3	–	0	6	–	5
Salisbury ^	2	–	1	9	–	2
Wesley	1	–	2	5	–	5
Apprentice §	0	–	3	5	–	5
$ – Conference champion; ^ – NCAA Division III playoff participant; § – Not an NCAA member

2002 Centennial Conference football standings
	Conf.			Overall
Team	W		L	W		L
Muhlenberg +^	5	–	1	10	–	2
Johns Hopkins +	5	–	1	9	–	2
McDaniel +	5	–	1	9	–	2
Dickinson	3	–	3	5	–	5
Franklin & Marshall	2	–	4	4	–	6
Gettysburg	1	–	5	4	–	6
Ursinus	0	–	6	2	–	8
+ – Conference co-champions; ^ – NCAA Division III playoff participant

2002 College Conference of Illinois and Wisconsin football standings
	Conf.			Overall
Team	W		L	W		L
Wheaton (IL) $^	7	–	0	10	–	2
Augustana (IL)	6	–	1	7	–	2
Millikin	4	–	3	7	–	3
North Central (IL)	4	–	3	6	–	4
Illinois Wesleyan	3	–	4	6	–	4
Carthage	3	–	4	4	–	6
Elmhurst	1	–	6	3	–	7
North Park	0	–	7	1	–	9
$ – Conference champion; ^ – NCAA Division III playoff participant

2002 Dixie Conference football standings
	Conf.			Overall
Team	W		L	W		L
Christopher Newport +^	5	–	1	6	–	5
Ferrum +	5	–	1	5	–	5
Shenandoah	4	–	2	5	–	5
Greensboro	4	–	2	4	–	6
Methodist	2	–	4	3	–	7
Averett	1	–	5	2	–	7
Chowan	0	–	6	0	–	10
+ – Conference co-champions; ^ – NCAA Division III playoff participant

2002 Empire 8 Athletic Conference football standings
	Conf.			Overall
Team	W		L	W		L
Ithaca $	4	–	0	7	–	3
Hartwick	3	–	1	8	–	2
St. John Fisher	2	–	2	6	–	4
Alfred	1	–	3	4	–	6
Utica	0	–	4	1	–	9
$ – Conference champion

2002 Freedom Football Conference standings
	Conf.			Overall
Team	W		L	W		L
Springfield (MA) $^	6	–	0	8	–	2
Merchant Marine	5	–	1	8	–	3
Western Connecticut	4	–	2	7	–	3
WPI	3	–	3	4	–	6
Norwich	2	–	4	4	–	6
Coast Guard	1	–	5	2	–	7
Plymouth State	0	–	6	0	–	10
$ – Conference champion; ^ – NCAA Division III playoff participant

2002 Heartland Collegiate Athletic Conference football standings
	Conf.			Overall
Team	W		L	W		L
Hanover $^	6	–	0	10	–	1
Anderson (IN)	5	–	1	7	–	3
Mount St. Joseph	4	–	2	5	–	5
Manchester	2	–	4	3	–	7
Franklin (IN)	2	–	4	2	–	8
Bluffton	1	–	5	3	–	7
Defiance	1	–	5	3	–	7
$ – Conference champion; ^ – NCAA Division III playoff participant

2002 Illini–Badger Football Conference standings
	Conf.			Overall
Team	W		L	W		L
MacMurray $^	7	–	0	10	–	1
Concordia (WI)	6	–	1	8	–	2
Aurora	5	–	2	5	–	4
Lakeland	4	–	3	6	–	4
Benedictine (IL)	3	–	4	4	–	6
Eureka	2	–	5	2	–	8
Greenville	1	–	6	1	–	9
Concordia (IL)	0	–	7	0	–	10
$ – Conference champion; ^ – NCAA Division III playoff participant

2002 Iowa Conference football standings
	Conf.			Overall
Team	W		L	W		L
Coe +^	8	–	1	10	–	2
Wartburg +^	8	–	1	10	–	2
Central (IA) +	8	–	1	8	–	2
Simpson (IA)	6	–	3	6	–	4
Loras	4	–	5	5	–	5
Cornell (IA)	3	–	6	4	–	6
Luther	3	–	6	4	–	6
Buena Vista	3	–	6	3	–	7
Upper Iowa	2	–	7	2	–	8
Dubuque	0	–	9	1	–	9
+ – Conference co-champions; ^ – NCAA Division III playoff participant

2002 Michigan Intercollegiate Athletic Association football standings
	Conf.			Overall
Team	W		L	W		L
Alma $^	6	–	0	9	–	2
Hope	4	–	2	5	–	5
Adrian	3	–	3	6	–	4
Olivet	3	–	3	5	–	4
Albion	3	–	3	5	–	5
Kalamazoo	2	–	5	4	–	5
Wisconsin Lutheran	0	–	6	3	–	7
$ – Conference champion; ^ – NCAA Division III playoff participant

2002 Middle Atlantic Conference football standings
	Conf.			Overall
Team	W		L	W		L
King's (PA) $^	8	–	1	9	–	3
Widener	8	–	1	9	–	1
Moravian	7	–	2	7	–	4
Lycoming	6	–	3	6	–	3
Wilkes	5	–	4	7	–	4
Susquehanna	5	–	4	5	–	5
Juniata	4	–	5	5	–	5
Albright	2	–	7	2	–	8
Fairleigh Dickinson–Florham	2	–	7	2	–	8
Delaware Valley	1	–	8	2	–	8
Lebanon Valley	1	–	8	1	–	9
$ – Conference champion; ^ – NCAA Division III playoff participant

2002 Midwest Conference football standings
	Conf.			Overall
Team	W		L	W		L
St. Norbert +^	8	–	1	9	–	1
Lake Forest +^	8	–	1	9	–	2
Ripon	7	–	2	7	–	3
Beloit	5	–	4	6	–	4
Knox	5	–	4	6	–	4
Monmouth (IL)	5	–	4	5	–	5
Grinnell	4	–	5	4	–	6
Illinois College	2	–	7	3	–	7
Carroll (WI)	1	–	8	1	–	9
Lawrence	0	–	9	0	–	10
+ – Conference co-champions; ^ – NCAA Division III playoff participant

2002 Minnesota Intercollegiate Athletic Conference football standings
	Conf.					Overall
Team	W		L		T	W		L		T
Saint John's (MN) $^	8	–	0	–	0	12	–	2	–	0
Concordia–Moorhead	7	–	1	–	0	7	–	3	–	0
Gustavus Adolphus	5	–	3	–	0	6	–	4	–	0
Bethel (MN)	5	–	3	–	0	5	–	5	–	0
St. Thomas (MN)	5	–	3	–	0	5	–	5	–	0
St. Olaf	3	–	5	–	0	5	–	5	–	0
Hamline	2	–	6	–	0	3	–	7	–	0
Augsburg	1	–	7	–	0	2	–	8	–	0
Carleton	0	–	8	–	0	0	–	10	–	0
$ – Conference champion; ^ – NCAA Division III playoff participant

2002 New England Football Conference standings
	Conf.			Overall
Team	W		L	W		L
Bogan Division
Westfield State xy	6	–	0	8	–	3
Worcester State	5	–	1	9	–	2
Fitchburg State	4	–	2	5	–	4
Bridgewater State	3	–	3	4	–	5
Framingham State	1	–	5	1	–	8
Maine Maritime	1	–	5	1	–	8
Massachusetts Maritime	1	–	5	1	–	8
Boyd Division
UMass Dartmouth xy$^	5	–	0	11	–	1
Curry	3	–	2	7	–	3
Nichols	3	–	2	5	–	4
MIT	2	–	3	4	–	5
Salve Regina	2	–	3	2	–	7
Western New England	0	–	5	1	–	8
Championship: UMass Dartmouth 16, Westfield State 0
$ – Conference champion; x – Division champion/co-champions; y – Championship game participant; ^ – NCAA Division III playoff participant

2002 New England Small College Athletic Conference football standings
	Conf.			Overall
Team	W		L	W		L
Trinity (CT) +	7	–	1	7	–	1
Williams +	7	–	1	7	–	1
Amherst	6	–	2	6	–	2
Wesleyan	5	–	3	5	–	3
Colby	4	–	4	4	–	4
Middlebury	4	–	4	4	–	4
Bates	3	–	5	3	–	5
Tufts	3	–	5	3	–	5
Bowdoin	1	–	7	1	–	7
Hamilton	0	–	8	0	–	8
+ – Conference co-champions

2002 New Jersey Athletic Conference football standings
	Conf.			Overall
Team	W		L	W		L
Rowan $^	6	–	0	10	–	1
Cortland	4	–	2	9	–	2
TCNJ	4	–	2	6	–	3
Montclair State	4	–	2	5	–	5
Kean	2	–	4	4	–	6
New Jersey City	1	–	5	1	–	8
William Paterson	0	–	6	1	–	9
$ – Conference champion; ^ – NCAA Division III playoff participant

2002 North Coast Athletic Conference football standings
	Conf.			Overall
Team	W		L	W		L
Wabash $^	7	–	0	12	–	1
Wittenberg ^	6	–	1	10	–	2
Wooster	5	–	2	8	–	2
Allegheny	4	–	3	5	–	5
Earlham	4	–	3	4	–	6
Ohio Wesleyan	3	–	4	5	–	5
Oberlin	3	–	4	3	–	7
Denison	2	–	5	2	–	8
Kenyon	1	–	6	1	–	9
Hiram	0	–	7	0	–	10
$ – Conference champion; ^ – NCAA Division III playoff participant

2002 Northwest Conference football standings
	Conf.			Overall
Team	W		L	W		L
Linfield $^	5	–	0	10	–	1
Whitworth	3	–	2	7	–	3
Willamette	3	–	2	6	–	3
Pacific Lutheran	3	–	2	5	–	4
Lewis & Clark	1	–	4	3	–	6
Puget Sound	0	–	5	1	–	8
$ – Conference champion; ^ – NCAA Division III playoff participant

2002 Ohio Athletic Conference football standings
	Conf.			Overall
Team	W		L	W		L
Mount Union $^	9	–	0	14	–	0
John Carroll ^	8	–	1	12	–	2
Baldwin–Wallace	7	–	2	8	–	2
Capital	6	–	3	6	–	4
Ohio Northern	5	–	4	5	–	5
Muskingum	3	–	6	3	–	7
Marietta	2	–	7	3	–	7
Wilmington (OH)	2	–	7	3	–	7
Heidelberg	2	–	7	2	–	8
Otterbein	1	–	8	2	–	8
$ – Conference champion; ^ – NCAA Division III playoff participant

2002 Old Dominion Athletic Conference football standings
	Conf.			Overall
Team	W		L	W		L
Bridgewater $^	6	–	0	11	–	1
Hampden–Sydney	5	–	1	8	–	2
Randolph–Macon	3	–	3	6	–	4
Washington and Lee	3	–	3	5	–	5
Catholic University	2	–	4	4	–	6
Emory & Henry	2	–	4	4	–	6
Guilford	0	–	6	3	–	7
$ – Conference champion; ^ – NCAA Division III playoff participant

2002 Presidents' Athletic Conference football standings
	Conf.			Overall
Team	W		L	W		L
Washington & Jefferson $^	5	–	0	9	–	3
Westminster (PA)	4	–	1	6	–	4
Waynesburg	2	–	3	5	–	4
Thiel	2	–	3	3	–	7
Bethany (WV)	1	–	4	3	–	7
Grove City	1	–	4	3	–	7
$ – Conference champion; ^ – NCAA Division III playoff participant

2002 Southern California Intercollegiate Athletic Conference football standings
	Conf.			Overall
Team	W		L	W		L
Redlands $^	5	–	0	7	–	3
Claremont-Mudd-Scripps	4	–	1	7	–	2
Cal Lutheran	3	–	2	4	–	5
Occidental	1	–	4	5	–	4
La Verne	1	–	4	3	–	5
Whittier	1	–	4	1	–	8
$ – Conference champion; ^ – NCAA Division III playoff participant

2002 Southern Collegiate Athletic Conference football standings
	Conf.			Overall
Team	W		L	W		L
Trinity (TX) $^	6	–	0	14	–	1
DePauw	5	–	1	7	–	3
Sewanee	4	–	2	5	–	5
Centre	2	–	4	6	–	4
Rose–Hulman	2	–	4	3	–	7
Rhodes	1	–	5	4	–	6
Millsaps	1	–	5	3	–	6
$ – Conference champion; ^ – NCAA Division III playoff participant

2002 University Athletic Association football standings
	Conf.			Overall
Team	W		L	W		L
Washington University $	3	–	0	6	–	4
Case Western Reserve	1	–	2	6	–	4
Carnegie Mellon	1	–	2	5	–	5
Chicago	1	–	2	4	–	5
$ – Conference champion

2002 Upper Midwest Athletic Conference football standings
	Conf.			Overall
Team	W		L	W		L
North
Northwestern (MN) x	3	–	0	8	–	2
Martin Luther	2	–	1	6	–	3
Crown	1	–	2	2	–	7
Trinity Bible	0	–	3	0	–	9
South
Maranatha Baptist x	4	–	0	6	–	3
Westminster (MO)	3	–	1	7	–	2
Principia	2	–	2	5	–	4
Rockford	1	–	3	4	–	6
Blackburn	0	–	4	1	–	8
x – Division champion/co-champions

2002 Upstate Collegiate Athletic Association football standings
	Conf.			Overall
Team	W		L	W		L
Hobart $^	4	–	0	8	–	2
Union (NY)	3	–	1	5	–	5
RPI	2	–	2	8	–	2
Rochester (NY)	1	–	3	2	–	8
St. Lawrence	0	–	4	0	–	10
$ – Conference champion; ^ – NCAA Division III playoff participant

2002 Wisconsin Intercollegiate Athletic Conference football standings
	Conf.			Overall
Team	W		L	W		L
Wisconsin–La Crosse $^	6	–	1	7	–	4
Wisconsin–Eau Claire	5	–	2	8	–	2
Wisconsin–Stout	4	–	3	7	–	3
Wisconsin–Stevens Point	4	–	3	6	–	4
Wisconsin–Whitewater	4	–	3	5	–	5
Wisconsin–Oshkosh	2	–	5	4	–	6
Wisconsin–River Falls	2	–	5	3	–	7
Wisconsin–Platteville	1	–	6	2	–	7
$ – Conference champion; ^ – NCAA Division III playoff participant

2002 NCAA Division III independents football records
	Conf.			Overall
Team	W		L	W		L
Brockport ^		–		10	–	3
Thomas More		–		7	–	3
Macalester		–		5	–	5
Menlo		–		5	–	5
Pomona-Pitzer		–		4	–	4
Chapman		–		3	–	7
Mount Ida		–		2	–	7
Colorado College		–		1	–	8
Buffalo State		–		1	–	9
Maryville (TN)		–		0	–	10
^ – NCAA Division III playoff participant

== Conference champions ==
Conference champions
- American Southwest Conference – Mary Hardin–Baylor
- Atlantic Central Football Conference – Frostburg State
- Centennial Conference – Johns Hopkins, McDaniel, and Muhlenberg
- College Conference of Illinois and Wisconsin – Wheaton (IL)
- Dixie Intercollegiate Football Conference – Christopher Newport and Ferrum
- Empire 8 Conference – Ithaca
- Freedom Football Conference – Springfield
- Heartland Collegiate Athletic Conference – Hanover
- Illini-Badger Football Conference – MacMurray
- Iowa Intercollegiate Athletic Conference – Central (IA), Coe, and Wartburg
- Michigan Intercollegiate Athletic Association – Alma
- Middle Atlantic Conference – King's College and Widener
- Midwest Conference – Lake Forest and St. Norbert
- Minnesota Intercollegiate Athletic Conference – Saint John's (MN)
- New England Football Conference – Westfield State (Bogan Division), UMass Dartmouth (Boyd Division)
  - Championship Game: UMass Dartmouth 16, Westfield State 0
- New England Small College Athletic Conference – Trinity (CT) and Williams
- New Jersey Athletic Conference – Rowan
- North Coast Athletic Conference – Wabash
- Northwest Conference – Linfield
- Ohio Athletic Conference – Mount Union
- Old Dominion Athletic Conference – Bridgewater
- Presidents' Athletic Conference – Washington & Jefferson
- Southern California Intercollegiate Athletic Conference – Redlands
- Southern Collegiate Athletic Conference – Trinity (TX)
- University Athletic Association – Washington–Saint Louis
- Upper Midwest Athletic Conference – Northwestern–St. Paul
- Upstate Collegiate Athletic Conference – Hobart
- Wisconsin Intercollegiate Athletic Conference – Wisconsin–La Crosse

== Postseason ==
The 2002 NCAA Division III Football Championship playoffs were the 30th annual single-elimination tournament to determine the national champion of men's NCAA Division III college football. The championship Stagg Bowl game was held at Salem Football Stadium in Salem, Virginia for the 10th time. This was the fourth bracket to feature 28 teams since last expanding in 1999.

=== Playoff bracket ===
First Round; Campus Sites
Wheaton (IL)	42
Alma	14
Wabash	42
MacMurray	7
Wittenberg	34
Hanover	33
Brockport	16
Springfield	0
John Carroll	27
Hobart	7
Muhlenberg	56
UMass Dartmouth	6
Wartburg	45
Lake Forest	0
Saint John's (MN)	31
Redlands	24
Coe	21
UW–La Crosse	18
King's (PA)	28
Salisbury State	0
Trinity (TX)	48
Mary Hardin–Baylor	38
Wash. & Jefferson	24
Christopher Newport	10

Second Round; Campus Sites
Mount Union	42
Wheaton (IL)	21
Wabash	25
Wittenberg	14
Rowan	12
Brockport	15
John Carroll	21
Muhlenberg	10
Linfield	52
Wartburg	15
Saint John's (MN)	45
Coe	14
Bridgewater (VA)	19
King's (PA)	17
Trinity (TX)	45
Wash. & Jefferson	10

Quarterfinals; Campus Sites
Mount Union	45
Wabash	16
Brockport	10
John Carroll	16*
Linfield	14
Saint John's (MN)	21
Bridgewater (VA)	32
Trinity (TX)	38

Semifinals; Campus Sites
Mount Union	57
John Carroll	19
Saint John's (MN)	34
Trinity (TX)	41

National Championship Game; Salem Football Stadium; Salem, Virginia
Mount Union	48
Trinity (TX)	7

* Overtime

== See also ==
- 2002 NCAA Division I-A football season
- 2002 NCAA Division I-AA football season
- 2002 NCAA Division II football season
