= Alan M. Holman =

American football and basketball coach (1904–1994)

Biographical details
- Born: December 30, 1904; Missouri, U.S.
- Died: October 8, 1994 (aged 89); Franklin, Ohio, U.S.

Playing career

Football
- 1924: Parsons
- 1926: Iowa State
- 1928–1929: Ohio State
- Position: Quarterback

Coaching career (HC unless noted)

Football
- 1931–1941: Franklin & Marshall

Basketball
- 1933–1935: Franklin & Marshall

Head coaching record
- Overall: 63–25–5 (football); 14–13 (basketball)

Accomplishments and honors

Championships
- Football; 7 Eastern Pennsylvania Collegiate (1932, 1934–1936, 1938, 1940–1941)

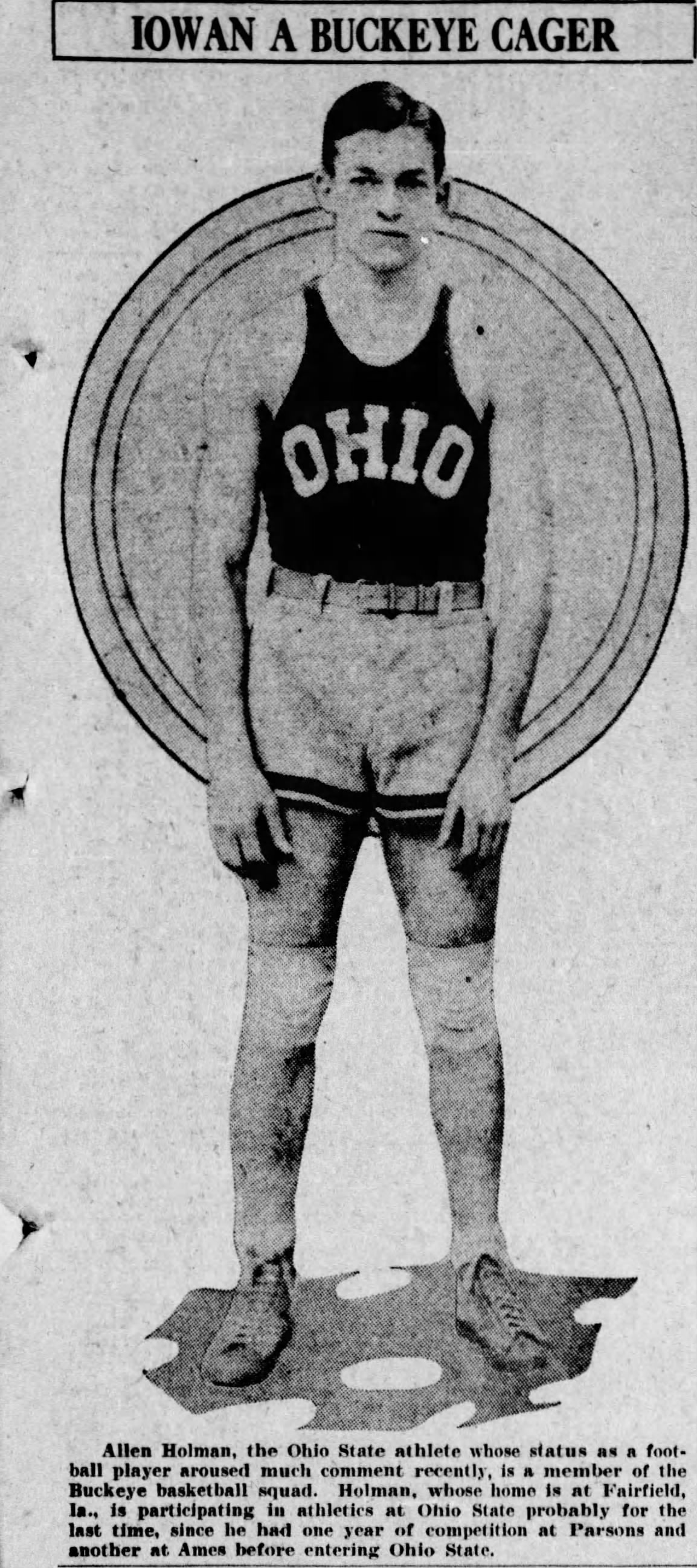

Alan M. Holman (December 30, 1904 – October 8, 1994) was an American college football player and coach of college football and college basketball. Holman played football at Parsons College (1924), Iowa State University (1926) and Ohio State University (1928–1929). Holman was the head football coach at Franklin & Marshall College in Lancaster, Pennsylvania. He held that position for 11 seasons, from 1931 until 1941, compiling a record of 63–25–5. Holman was also the head basketball coach at Franklin & Marshall for two seasons, from 1933 to 1935, tallying a mark of 14–13.

== Head coaching record ==
=== Football ===
Year	Team	Overall	Conference	Standing	Bowl/playoffs
Franklin & Marshall Diplomats (Eastern Pennsylvania Collegiate Conference) (1931–1941)
1931	Franklin & Marshall	6–2	3–1	2nd	
1932	Franklin & Marshall	4–2–1	2–1–1	T–1st	
1933	Franklin & Marshall	4–5	2–2	3rd	
1934	Franklin & Marshall	8–1	3–1	T–1st	
1935	Franklin & Marshall	7–2–1	4–0	1st	
1936	Franklin & Marshall	7–1–1	3–0–1	1st	
1937	Franklin & Marshall	4–4	2–2	T–2nd	
1938	Franklin & Marshall	6–2	3–1	T–1st	
1939	Franklin & Marshall	5–3–1	1–1–1	3rd	
1940	Franklin & Marshall	7–2	3–0	1st	
1941	Franklin & Marshall	5–1–1	2–1	T–1st	
Franklin & Marshall:		63–25–5	28–10–3		
Total:		63–25–5			
National championship Conference title Conference division title or championship game berth
