= Dickinson Red Devils football =

American college football program

- First season: 1885; 141 years ago
- Head coach: Brad Fordyce; 9th season, 43–49 (.467)
- Location: Carlisle, Pennsylvania
- Stadium: Biddle Field Complex
- NCAA division: Division III
- Conference: Centennial
- Nickname: Red Devils; Red and White (historical)
- Colors: Red and black
- Playoff record: 0–4 (.000)
- Bowl record: 4–3 (.571)

Conference championships
- Centennial Conference: 1986, 1987, 1988, 1989, 1990, 1993, 1994, 2004, 2006, 2026
- Rivalries: Franklin & Marshall Diplomats; Gettysburg Bullets
- Fight song: "Dickinson Fight Song"

The Dickinson Red Devils football program represents Dickinson College in college football at the NCAA Division III level. The Red Devils have competed as members of the Centennial Conference since 1983 and play their home games at the Biddle Field Complex in Carlisle, Pennsylvania. Brad Fordyce has served as the team's head coach since 2017.

Historically known as the Red and White, Dickinson adopted the "Red Devils" nickname in 1930 after they were dubbed such by a writer from the Public Ledger.

Dickinson has won ten Centennial Conference titles: five consecutive under Ed Sweeney (1986–1990), four under Darwin Breaux (1993, 1994, 2004, 2007), and one under Brad Fordyce (2026). The Red Devils have appeared in the NCAA Division III Football Championship playoffs four times, in 1989, 1991, 1994, 2006, losing in the first round each time.

== Rivalries ==
The Red Devils are a part of two trophy rivalry games with Centennial Conference foes F&M and Gettysburg.

=== Franklin & Marshall ===
Since 1889, Dickinson has played Franklin & Marshall in the Battle for the Conestoga Wagon. The winner of each game is awarded the Conestoga Wagon trophy. After each contest is held, the winning side retains possession of the Wagon until the next game is decided. F&M holds possession of the Wagon after winning the 2022 contest. F&M leads the all-time series 67–43–3 through the 2022 season.

=== Gettysburg ===
Since 1892, Dickinson has played Gettysburg in the Little Brown Bucket Game. The winner of each game is awarded the Little Brown Bucket trophy. After each contest is held, the winning side retains possession of the Bucket until the next game is decided. Dickinson holds possession of the Bucket after winning the 2022 contest. Gettysburg leads the all-time series 42–41–2 through the 2022 season.
