= Franklin & Marshall Diplomats football =

College football team in NCAA Division III

- First season: 1886; 140 years ago
- Athletic director: Lauren Packer
- Head coach: Michael Phelan; 2nd season, 17–4 (.810)
- Location: Lancaster, Pennsylvania
- Stadium: Shadek Stadium (capacity: 2,500)
- Field: Tom Gilburg Field
- NCAA division: Division III
- Conference: Centennial
- Nickname: Diplomats; Blue and White; Nevonians (historical)
- Colors: Blue, white, and light blue
- All-time record: 684–518–47 (.566)
- Playoff record: 0–1 (.000)
- Bowl record: 10–6 (.625)

Conference championships
- EPCC: 1932, 1934, 1935, 1936, 1938, 1940, 1941; Centennial Conference: 1986, 1987, 1988, 1993, 1995, 2004, 2017, 2025

Division championships
- MAC Southern Division: 1964, 1968, 1971, 1972, 1973, 1974, 1976
- Rivalries: Dickinson Red Devils; Gettysburg Bullets; Swarthmore Garnet Tide (historical)
- Fight song: Down the Field "Hail! Hail! Nevonia" (historical)
- Mascot: Benjamin Franklin (historical); John Marshall (historical)
- Website: Go Diplomats

The Franklin & Marshall Diplomats football program represents Franklin & Marshall College in college football at the NCAA Division III level. The Diplomats have competed as members of the Centennial Conference since 1983 and play their home games at Shadek Stadium in Lancaster, Pennsylvania. Michael Phelan has served as the team's head coach since 2025.

Franklin & Marshall football began in 1886 and played its first game on October 18, 1887. From 1889 to 1895, the program was coached by team captains. Alfred E. Bull was hired in 1896 as Franklin & Marshall's first professional coach. Originally known as the Nevonians, the program acquired the Diplomat nickname after a well-received game played against Fordham University in 1935.

Until the 2025 season, the Diplomats never appeared in the NCAA Division III Football Championship playoffs. However, under first year head coach Michael Phelan, the Diplomats upset #3 Johns Hopkins University to win the 2025 Centennial Conference championship and automatic bid to the playoffs. Additionally, the Diplomats have played in 15 NCAA Division III bowl games.

== History ==
=== Early history ===
Franklin & Marshall football began in 1886 when the school joined forces with the University of Pennsylvania, Swarthmore College, Lehigh University, Lafayette College, and Haverford College to found the short-lived Inter-state Athletic Association.

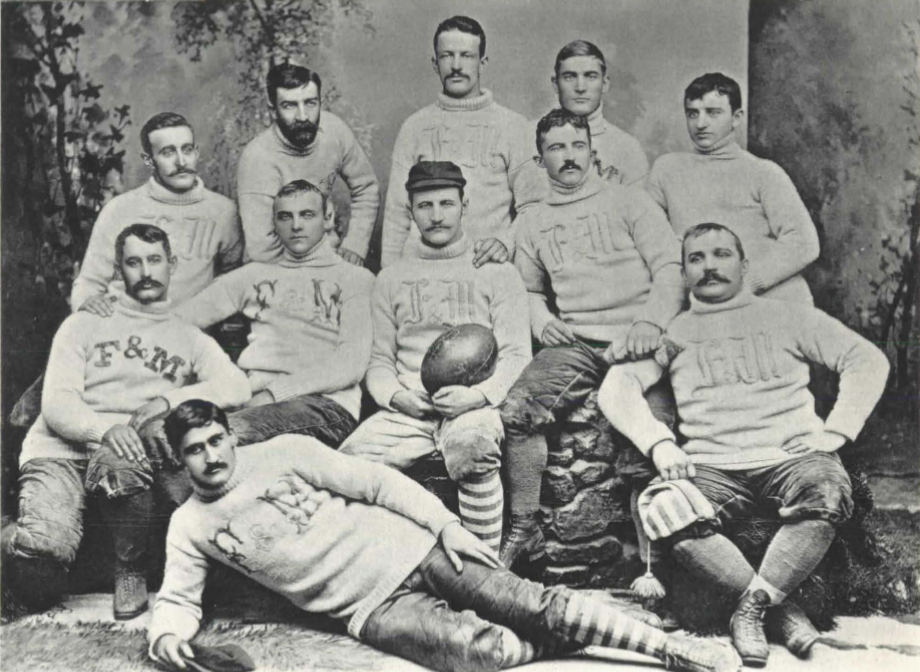
1890 Franklin and Marshall Nevonians football team

Under team captain William Mann Irvine, the Franklin & Marshall Nevonians played their first game against the York County YMCA on October 18, 1887. Future college president Henry Harbaugh Apple played on the first F&M football team, later promoting its growth on campus. The first win for the program against another collegiate team came in 1889 with a 60–0 win against Millersville University.

Franklin & Marshall was a founding member of the short-lived Pennsylvania Intercollegiate Football Association. Playing for one season in 1891, Franklin & Marshall's 12–6 victory against Bucknell University gave the first and only conference championship to Penn State.

=== Diplomats nickname ===
From 1886 to 1935, all Franklin & Marshall sports teams were known as the Nevonians. The nickname derived from the last name of F&M's second president, John Williamson Nevin. In 1935, against the nationally ranked Fordham Rams, the Nevonians traveled to New York as heavy underdogs. Despite their underdog status, the Nevonians kept the game competitive and nearly upset the Rams. The sportsmanship earned the team praise from New York City newspapers, who christened the team ''Diplomats.''

=== Founding the Centennial Conference ===
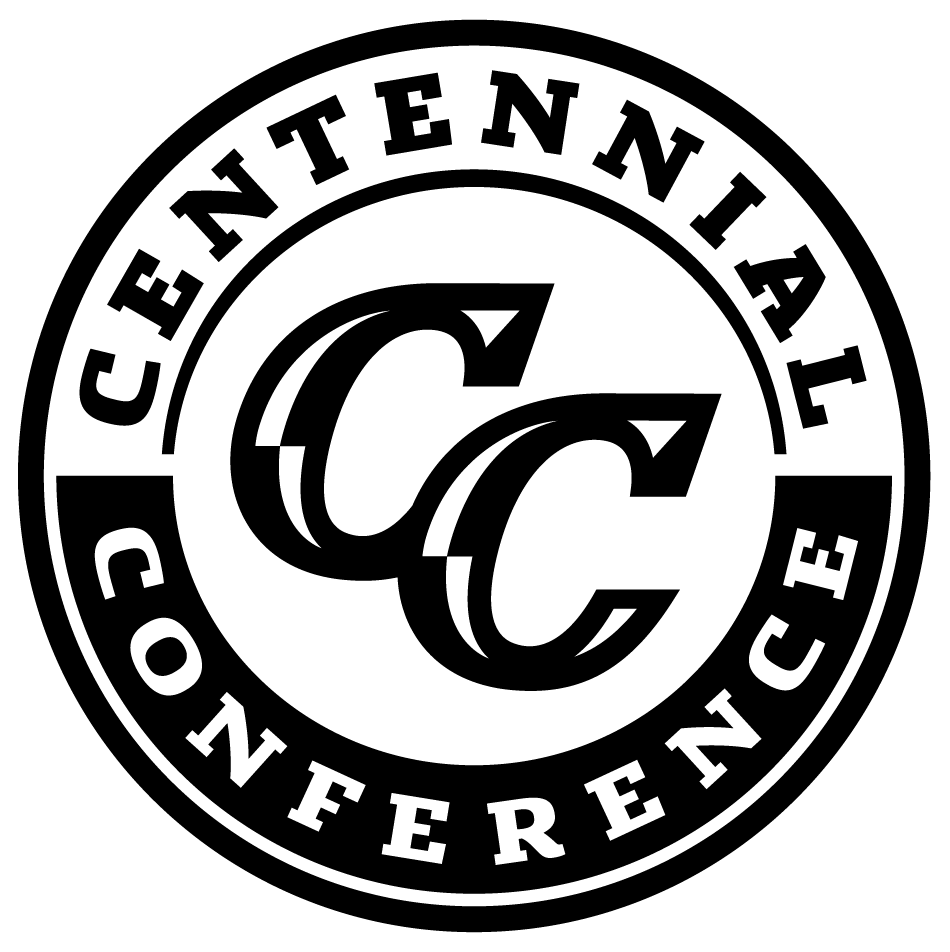
Centennial Conference logo

On June 4, 1981, F&M President Keith Spalding announced the formation of the football-only Centennial Football Conference. Headquartered on Franklin and Marshall's campus, the Diplomats led Dickinson College, Gettysburg College, Johns Hopkins University, Muhlenberg College, Swarthmore College, Ursinus College, and Western Maryland College as founding members of the conference.

The conference existed as a football-only conference until 1992, when a commissioner's report recommended sponsoring other sports. In 1992, Bryn Mawr College, Haverford College, and Washington College were invited as additional charter members of the refounded, all-sports Centennial Conference.

== Rivalries ==
=== Dickinson ===
Franklin & Marshall played the Dickinson College Red Devils for the first time in 1889. Franklin & Marshall won the match, beginning one of the longest sports rivalries in college football. Since 1889, the Diplomats and Red Devils have played 117 times, known as the Battle for the Wagon.

=== Gettysburg ===
Gettysburg College and Franklin & Marshall met on the football field for the first time in 1890. The rivalry is one of the longest ongoing sports rivalries in college football, as the Gettysburg Bullets and Diplomats have faced each other 111 times since 1890. The winner of the rivalry game earns the Lincoln Football Trophy.

On October 3, 2026, the Diplomats won their 10th straight victory against Gettysburg, the longest winning streak in series history.

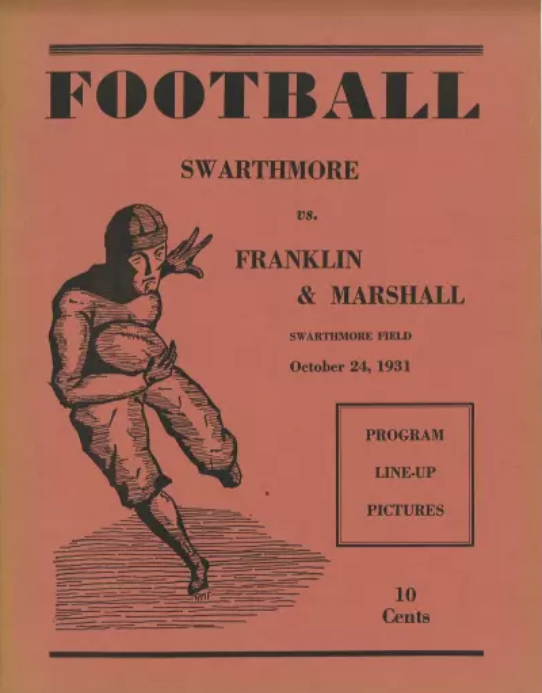
Swarthmore v. Franklin and Marshall (1931)

=== Swarthmore (1889–2000) ===
Before discontinuing its program, Swarthmore College and Franklin & Marshall played one of the then-longest standing college football rivalries. Swarthmore and F&M first met on the field in 1889 in a 22–4 victory for Franklin & Marshall. Both teams joined the Centennial Conference, where they met regularly until Swarthmore discontinued its football program in 2000. The Swarthmore Garnet Tide and Diplomats played 87 games, where the Diplomats led the series 48–28–9.

== Conference championships ==
Franklin & Marshall has won 15 conference titles, most recently in 2025. The Diplomats won seven Eastern Pennsylvania Collegiate Conference titles between 1932 and 1941 under head coach Alan M. Holman. Since 1986, Franklin & Marshall has won eight Centennial Conference titles, three of them outright.

Season	Coach	Conference	Overall record	Conference record
1932†	Alan M. Holman	Eastern Pennsylvania Collegiate Conference	4–2–1	2–1–1
1934†	Alan M. Holman	Eastern Pennsylvania Collegiate Conference	8–1	3–1
1935	Alan M. Holman	Eastern Pennsylvania Collegiate Conference	7–2–1	4–0
1936	Alan M. Holman	Eastern Pennsylvania Collegiate Conference	7–1–1	3–0–1
1938†	Alan M. Holman	Eastern Pennsylvania Collegiate Conference	6–2	3–1
1940	Alan M. Holman	Eastern Pennsylvania Collegiate Conference	7–2	3–0
1941†	Alan M. Holman	Eastern Pennsylvania Collegiate Conference	5–1–1	2–1
1986†	Tom Gilburg	Centennial Conference	8–3	6–1
1987	Tom Gilburg	Centennial Conference	9–1–1	7–0
1988†	Tom Gilburg	Centennial Conference	7–3	6–1
1993†	Tom Gilburg	Centennial Conference	6–4	5–2
1995	Tom Gilburg	Centennial Conference	7–3	6–1
2004†	Shawn Halloran	Centennial Conference	8–3	4–2
2017†	John Troxell	Centennial Conference	10–1	8–1
2025	Michael Phelan	Centennial Conference	9–2	7–0

† Co-champions

=== Division championships ===
In their time in the Middle Atlantic Conference, the Diplomats won the Southern Division championship seven times.

Season	Overall record	Conference record
1964	8–0	7–0
1968†	6–2	6–1
1971	6–2	6–1
1972	9–0	8–0
1973	8–1	8–1
1974	9–0	8–0
1976	8–1	8–1

† Co-champions

== Postseason appearances ==
=== Bowl games ===
The Diplomats are 10–6 in bowl games.

Season	Bowl	Opponent	Result
1986	ECAC Southern Championship	Wagner	L 28–40
1987	ECAC Southern Championship	Kean	W 21–0
1989	ECAC Southwest Championship	St. John's (N.Y.)	W 31–18
1996	ECAC South Championship	Merchant Marine	L 0–20
2004	ECAC South Championship	Moravian	W 37–20
2005	ECAC South Championship	Salisbury	L 23–27
2009	ECAC South Atlantic Championship	Wilkes	W 29–24
2010	ECAC Southwest Championship	Washington & Jefferson	L 41–54
2012	ECAC Southeast Championship	Albright	L 34–38
2013	ECAC Southeast Championship	Delaware Valley	W 38–14
2016	Centennial-MAC Bowl Series	Albright	L 23–28
2017	Centennial-MAC Bowl Series	Widener	W 21–7
2018	Centennial-MAC Bowl Series	Lycoming	W 21–20
2019	Centennial-MAC Bowl Series	Misericordia	W 31–13
2021	Centennial-MAC Bowl Series	Stevenson	W 42–28
2023	Centennial-MAC Bowl Series	King's (Pa.)	W 30–7

=== NCAA Division III playoffs ===
The Diplomats have made one appearance in the NCAA Division III playoffs, with a combined record of 0–1.

Year	Round	Opponent	Result
2025	Second Round	Eastern	L, 24–28
