= Centennial Conference =

American college athletic conference

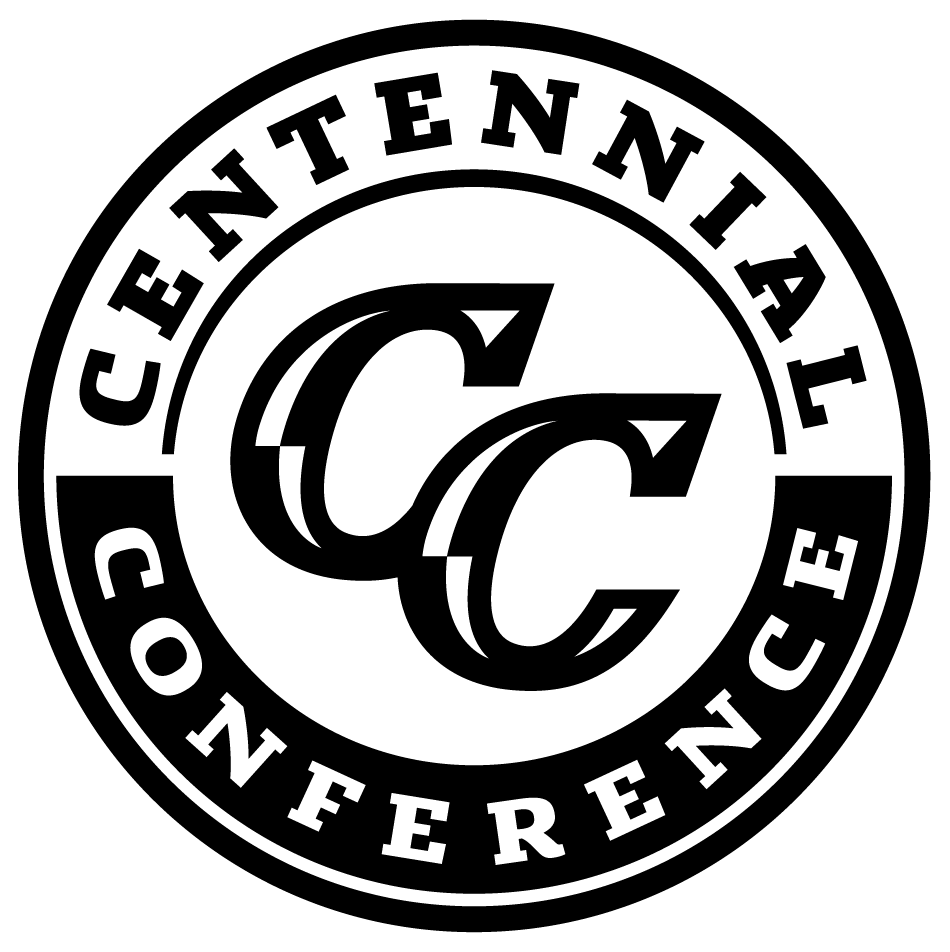
- Association: NCAA
- Founded: 1981; 45 years ago
- Commissioner: Portia Hoeg
- Sports fielded: 24; men's: 12; women's: 12
- Division: Division III
- No. of teams: 11 chartered members, 6 associate members
- Headquarters: Lancaster, Pennsylvania, U.S.
- Region: Mid-Atlantic
- Website: centennial.org

Locations
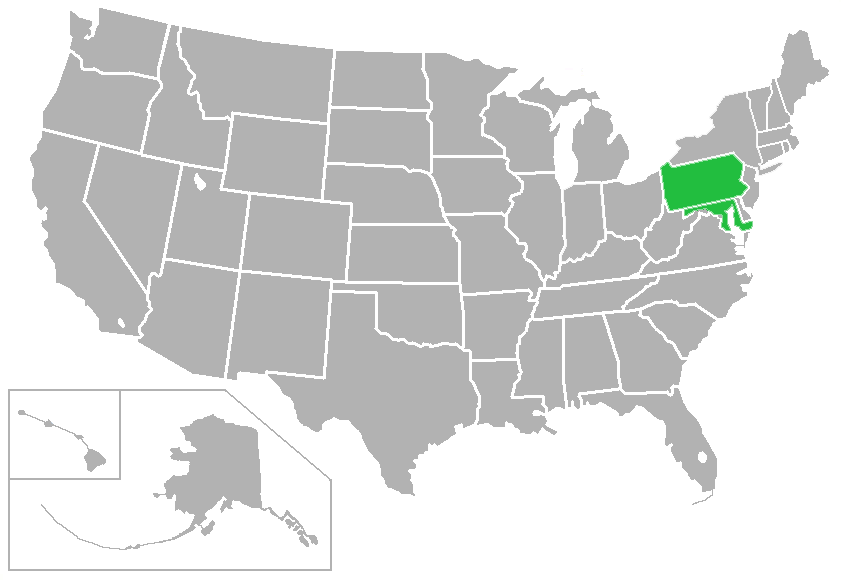

The Centennial Conference is an intercollegiate athletic conference which competes in the NCAA's Division III. Chartered member teams are located in Maryland and Pennsylvania; associate members are also located in New York and Virginia.

Eleven private colleges compose the chartered member teams of the Centennial Conference. Five of its 11 members rank among the top 50 national liberal arts colleges and Johns Hopkins University is ranked sixth among national universities.

On average, Centennial members sponsor 19 varsity teams. Conference members have won seventeen NCAA team titles: Johns Hopkins women's cross country (2012, 2013, 2014, 2016, 2017, 2019, 2021), Gettysburg women's lacrosse (2011, 2017, 2018), Haverford men's cross country (2010), Franklin & Marshall women's lacrosse (2007, 2009), Ursinus field hockey (2006), Washington men's lacrosse (1998), and Washington men's tennis (1994, 1997).

== History ==
Centennial Conference
Location of Centennial members: full, affiliate

According to the Centennial Conference's website, "On June 4, 1981, Keith Spalding, then-president of Franklin & Marshall College, made the announcement that "eight private colleges found it timely and appropriate to form a round-robin football schedule among institutions with similar attitudes and practices in intercollegiate football competition." With that statement, the Centennial Conference was born. Those private colleges were Dickinson College, Franklin & Marshall College, Gettysburg College, Johns Hopkins University, Muhlenberg College, Swarthmore College, Ursinus College, and Western Maryland College, later renamed and now known as McDaniel College.

The conference moved from a football-only conference to an all-sports conference after a 1991 feasibility study. The study also recommended to expand from eight schools to eleven. The other schools recommended were Bryn Mawr College, Haverford College, and Washington College. Those three schools accepted and became charter members in 1992 as the conference expanded its sports offerings.

All of the charter members defected from the Middle Atlantic Conference (MAC). Johns Hopkins and McDaniel College both played in the Mason–Dixon Conference prior to entering the MAC in 1975.

=== Recent changes ===
On August 21, 2019, Cabrini University joined the Centennial as an affiliate member for women's golf to replace Neumann University's spot, effective in the 2020 spring season (2019–20 academic year).

On August 31, 2022, football affiliates Juniata College, Moravian University and Susquehanna University departed for a new football league in the Landmark Conference, beginning the 2023 fall season (2022–23 academic year).

On August 6, 2024, Carnegie Mellon University will join the Centennial as an associate football member, effective beginning the 2025 fall season (2025–26 academic year).

=== Chronological timeline ===
- 1981 – On June 4, 1981, the Centennial Conference was founded as a football-only league, then known as the Centennial Football Conference. Charter members included Dickinson College, Franklin & Marshall College, Gettysburg College, Johns Hopkins University, Muhlenberg College, Swarthmore College, Ursinus College, and Western Maryland College (now McDaniel College), beginning the 1981 fall season (1981–82 academic year).
- 1992 – The Centennial Football Conference was rebranded as the Centennial Conference when the conference expanded to add other sports, beginning the 1992–93 academic year. Bryn Mawr College, Haverford College and Washington College also joined the newly-formed all-sports conference.
- 1998 – Washington and Lee University joined the Centennial as an affiliate member for men's wrestling in the 1998–99 academic year.
- 2001 – Johns Hopkins left the University Athletic Association (UAA) to fully align with the Centennial Conference for all the sports being sponsored in the 2001–02 academic year.
- 2004 – The United States Merchant Marine Academy (Merchant Marine) and Stevens Institute of Technology (Stevens or Stevens Tech) joined the Centennial as affiliate members for men's wrestling in the 2004-05 academic year.
- 2007 – Juniata College and Moravian College (now Moravian University) joined the Centennial as affiliate members for football in the 2007 fall season (2007–08 academic year).
- 2009 – Susquehanna University joined the Centennial as an affiliate member for women's golf in the 2010 spring season (2009–10 academic year).
- 2010 – Susquehanna added football into its Centennial affiliate membership in the 2010 fall season (2010–11 academic year).
- 2012 – New York University joined the Centennial as an affiliate member for men's wrestling in the 2012–13 academic year.
- 2016 – NYU left the Centennial as an affiliate member for wrestling after the 2015–16 academic year.
- 2017:
  - Susquehanna left the Centennial as an affiliate member for women's golf after the 2017 spring season (2016–17 academic year).
  - Marymount University and Neumann University joined the Centennial as affiliate members for women's golf in the 2018 spring season (2017–18 academic year).
- 2019:
  - Two institutions left the Centennial as affiliate members, both effective after the 2018–19 academic year:
    - Neumann for women's golf
    - and Stevens for men's wrestling
  - Cabrini University joined the Centennial as an affiliate member for women's golf to replace Neumann's spot in the 2020 spring season (2019–20 academic year).
- 2022 – Washington and Lee University left as an affiliate member in wrestling for their primary conference home, the Old Dominion Athletic Conference (ODAC), after the 2021–22 academic year.
- 2023 – Juniata, Moravian and Susquehanna left the Centennial as football affiliates for a new football league within their primary conference home, the Landmark Conference, after the 2022 fall season (2022–23 academic year).
- 2024 – Cabrini left the Centennial as an affiliate member for women's golf after the 2024 spring season (2024–25 academic year); as the school ceased operations in June 2024.
- 2025 – Carnegie Mellon University joined the Centennial as an associate football member, beginning the 2025 fall season (2025–26 academic year).

== Member schools ==
=== Current members ===
The Centennial currently has 11 full members, all are private schools:

Institution	Location	Founded	Affiliation	Enrollment	Acceptance Rate	Nickname	Colors	Joined (Note: Represents the calendar year when fall sports competition begins.)	Football
Bryn Mawr College (Note: This institution is a women's college, therefore it does not sponsor men's teams.)	Bryn Mawr, Pennsylvania	1885	Nonsectarian	1,381	38%	Owls		1992	No
Dickinson College	Carlisle, Pennsylvania	1783	Nonsectarian	2,420	35%	Red Devils		1981 (Note: Originally a charter member of the Centennial Football Conference in the 1981 fall season (1981–82 academic year); before the conference became an all-sports league, being declared as charter members since the 1992–93 academic year.)	Yes
Franklin & Marshall College	Lancaster, Pennsylvania	1787	Nonsectarian	1,911	28%	Diplomats		1981	Yes
Gettysburg College	Gettysburg, Pennsylvania	1832	Lutheran ELCA	2,384	56%	Bullets		1981	Yes
Haverford College	Haverford, Pennsylvania	1833	Nonsectarian	1,268	12.9%	Fords		1992	No
Johns Hopkins University (Note: Johns Hopkins had dual athletic conference membership with the University Athletic Association from 1992–93 to 2000–01, then the Blue Jays left the UAA in order to fully align with the Centennial Conference. Additionally, its men's and women's lacrosse teams do not play in the Centennial Conference, but instead play as Division I teams in the Big Ten Conference.)	Baltimore, Maryland	1876	Nonsectarian	20,174	6.5%	Blue Jays		1981	Yes
McDaniel College	Westminster, Maryland	1867	Nonsectarian	1,559	70%	Green Terror		1981	Yes
Muhlenberg College	Allentown, Pennsylvania	1848	Lutheran ELCA	2,408	68%	Mules		1981	Yes
Swarthmore College	Swarthmore, Pennsylvania	1864	Nonsectarian	1,543	8%	Garnet		1981	No
Ursinus College	Collegeville, Pennsylvania	1869	Secular	1,556	80%	Bears		1981	Yes
Washington College	Chestertown, Maryland	1782	Nonsectarian	1,479	57%	Shoremen & Shorewomen		1992	No

=== Affiliate members ===
The Centennial currently has three affiliate members, two private schools and a public school:

Institution	Location	Founded	Affiliation	Enrollment	Nickname	Joined (Note: Represents the calendar year when fall sports competition begins.)	Centennial sport	Primary conference
Carnegie Mellon University	Pittsburgh, Pennsylvania	1900	Nonsectarian	10,875	Tartans	2025	football	University (UAA)
Marymount University	Arlington, Virginia	1950	Catholic (RSHM)	3,684	Saints	2017	women's golf	Atlantic East (AEC)
United States Merchant Marine Academy (Merchant Marine)	Kings Point, New York	1943	Federal	1,011	Mariners	2004	wrestling	Skyline

=== Former affiliate members ===
The Centennial had eight former affiliate members, all were private schools:

Institution	Location	Founded	Affiliation	Enrollment	Nickname	Joined (Note: Represents the calendar year when fall sports competition begins.)	Left (Note: Represents the calendar year when spring sports competition ends.)	Centennial sport	Primary conference
Cabrini University	Radnor, Pennsylvania	1957	Catholic (Missionary Sisters)	1,759	Cavaliers	2019	2024	women's golf	N/A (Note: Cabrini closed following the 2023–24 academic year and was acquired by Villanova University.)
Juniata College	Huntingdon, Pennsylvania	1876	Church of the Brethren	1,568	Eagles	2007	2023	football	Landmark
Moravian University	Bethlehem, Pennsylvania	1742	Moravian	1,568	Greyhounds	2007	2023	football	Landmark
Neumann University	Aston, Pennsylvania	1965	Catholic (Franciscan)	3,000	Knights	2017	2019	women's golf	Atlantic East (AEC)
New York University	New York City	1832	Nonsectarian	22,280	Violets	2011	2016	wrestling	University (UAA)
Stevens Institute of Technology	Hoboken, New Jersey	1870	Nonsectarian	5,260	Ducks	2004	2019	wrestling	MAC Freedom
Susquehanna University	Selinsgrove, Pennsylvania	1858	Lutheran ELCA	2,195	River Hawks	2009^{w.gf.}	2017^{w.gf.}	women's golf	Landmark
Susquehanna University	Selinsgrove, Pennsylvania	1858	Lutheran ELCA	2,195	River Hawks	2010^{fb.}	2023^{fb.}	football	Landmark
Washington and Lee University	Lexington, Virginia	1749	Nonsectarian	1,830	Generals	1998	2022	wrestling	Old Dominion (ODAC)

=== Membership timeline ===
Full member (all sports) Full member (non-football) Associate member (football) Associate member (sport)

== Sports ==
A divisional format was used for basketball (M / W) from 1992–93 to 2002–03.
East
- Bryn Mawr
- Haverford
- Muhlenberg
- Swarthmore
- Ursinus
- Washington
West
- Dickinson
- Franklin & Marshall
- Gettysburg
- Johns Hopkins
- McDaniel

The Centennial Conference sponsors championships in the following sports:

Conference sports
Sport	Men's	Women's
Baseball	✓	
Basketball	✓	✓
Cross country	✓	✓
Field hockey		✓
Football	✓	
Golf	✓	✓
Lacrosse	✓	✓
Soccer	✓	✓
Softball		✓
Swimming	✓	✓
Tennis	✓	✓
Track and field (indoor)	✓	✓
Track and field (outdoor)	✓	✓
Volleyball		✓
Wrestling	✓	

=== Men's sponsored sports by school ===
School	Baseball	Basketball	Cross country	Football	Golf	Lacrosse	Soccer	Swimming	Tennis	Track & Field (indoor)	Track & Field (outdoor)	Wrestling	Total
Dickinson	✓	✓	✓	✓	✓	✓	✓	✓	✓	✓	✓	✗	11
Franklin & Marshall	✓	✓	✓	✓	✓	✓	✓	✓	✓	✓	✓	✗ (Note: Franklin & Marshall sponsors men's wrestling, however, the team does not compete in the Centennial Conference, but instead competes as a Division I team in the Eastern Intercollegiate Wrestling Association.)	11
Gettysburg	✓	✓	✓	✓	✓	✓	✓	✓	✓	✓	✓	✓	12
Haverford	✓	✓	✓	✗	✗	✓	✓	✗	✓	✓	✓	✗	9
Johns Hopkins	✓	✓	✓	✓	✗	✗ (Note: Johns Hopkins sponsors men's lacrosse, however, the team does not compete in the Centennial Conference, but instead competes as a Division I team in the Big Ten Conference.)	✓	✓	✓	✓	✓	✓	9
McDaniel	✓	✓	✓	✓	✓	✓	✓	✓	✓	✓	✓	✓	12
Muhlenberg	✓	✓	✓	✓	✓	✓	✓	✗	✓	✓	✓	✓	11
Swarthmore	✓	✓	✓	✗	✓	✓	✓	✓	✓	✓	✓	✗	10
Ursinus	✓	✓	✓	✓	✓	✓	✓	✓	✓	✓	✓	✓	12
Washington	✓	✓	✗	✗	✗	✓	✓	✓	✓	✗	✗	✗	6
Totals	10	10	9	7+1	7	9	10	8	10	9	9	5+1	104+2
Merchant Marine												✓	1
Carnegie Mellon				✓									1

==== Men's varsity sports not sponsored by the Centennial Conference that are played by Centennial schools ====
School	Fencing	Rowing	Sailing	Squash	Trap & Skeet	Water Polo
Dickinson	✗	✗	✗	MASC	✗	✗
Franklin & Marshall	✗	MARC	✗	MASC	✗	✗
Haverford	MACFA	✗	✗	CSA	✗	✗
Johns Hopkins	MACFA	✗	✗	✗	✗	MAWPC
Washington	✗	MARC	MAISA	✗	ACUI	✗

=== Women's sponsored sports by school ===
School	Basketball	Cross country	Field Hockey	Golf	Lacrosse	Soccer	Softball	Swimming	Tennis	Track & Field (indoor)	Track & Field (outdoor)	Volleyball	Total
Bryn Mawr	✓	✓	✓	✗	✓	✓	✗	✓	✓	✓	✓	✓	10
Dickinson	✓	✓	✓	✓	✓	✓	✓	✓	✓	✓	✓	✓	12
Franklin & Marshall	✓	✓	✓	✓	✓	✓	✓	✓	✓	✓	✓	✓	12
Gettysburg	✓	✓	✓	✓	✓	✓	✓	✓	✓	✓	✓	✓	12
Haverford	✓	✓	✓	✗	✓	✓	✓	✗	✓	✓	✓	✓	10
Johns Hopkins	✓	✓	✓	✗	✗ (Note: Johns Hopkins sponsors women's lacrosse, however, the team does not play in the Centennial Conference, but instead play as Division I teams in the Big Ten Conference.)	✓	✗	✓	✓	✓	✓	✓	8
McDaniel	✓	✓	✓	✓	✓	✓	✓	✓	✓	✓	✓	✓	12
Muhlenberg	✓	✓	✓	✓	✓	✓	✓	✗	✓	✓	✓	✓	11
Swarthmore	✓	✓	✓	✗	✓	✓	✓	✓	✓	✓	✓	✓	11
Ursinus	✓	✓	✓	✓	✓	✓	✓	✓	✓	✓	✓	✓	12
Washington	✓	✗	✓	✗	✓	✓	✓	✓	✓	✗	✗	✓	8
Totals	11	10	11	6+1	10	11	9	9	11	10	10	11	118+1
Marymount				✓									1

==== Women's varsity sports not sponsored by the Centennial Conference that are played by Centennial schools ====
School	Badminton	Fencing	Gymnastics	Rowing	Sailing	Squash	Trap & Skeet
Bryn Mawr	Independent	✗	✗	MARC	✗	✗	✗
Dickinson	✗	✗	✗	✗	✗	MASC	✗
Franklin & Marshall	✗	✗	✗	MARC	✗	MASC	✗
Haverford	✗	EWFC/NIWFA	✗	✗	✗	CSA	✗
Johns Hopkins	✗	MACFA	✗	✗	✗	✗	✗
Swarthmore	Independent	✗	✗	✗	✗	✗	✗
Ursinus	✗	✗	NCGA	✗	✗	✗	✗
Washington	✗	✗	✗	MARC	MAISA	✗	ACUI

== Current champions ==
Season	Sport	Women's Champion	Men's Champion
Fall 2025	Cross Country	Johns Hopkins (X17)	Johns Hopkins (X6)
Fall 2025	Field Hockey	Johns Hopkins (X11)	—N/a
Fall 2025	Football	—N/a	Franklin & Marshall (X8)
Fall 2025	Soccer	Johns Hopkins (X18)	Dickinson (X2)
Fall 2025	Volleyball	Johns Hopkins (X12)	—N/a
Winter 2025–26	Basketball	Gettysburg (X6)	Gettysburg (x4)
Winter 2025–26	Swimming	Swarthmore (X7)	Johns Hopkins (X1)
Winter 2025–26	Indoor Track & Field	Johns Hopkins (X15)	Johns Hopkins (X13)
Winter 2025–26	Wrestling	—N/a	Ursinus (X14)
Spring 2026	Baseball	—N/a	Johns Hopkins (x20)
Spring 2026	Golf	Marymount (X4)	Franklin & Marshall (X15)
Spring 2026	Lacrosse	Franklin & Marshall (X11)	Gettysburg (X11)
Spring 2026	Softball	Swarthmore (X3)	—N/a
Spring 2026	Tennis	Swarthmore (X7)	Swarthmore (X4)
Spring 2026	Outdoor Track and Field	Johns Hopkins (X16)	Johns Hopkins (X9)

== See also ==
- Centennial Conference football
- Centennial Conference men's basketball tournament
