= Mark Sullivan (American football) =

American football coach (born 1962 or 1963)

Current position
- Title: Associate head coach & defensive coordinator
- Team: Fitchburg State
- Conference: MASCAC

Biographical details
- Born: c. 1962 or 1963 (age 63–64); Marlborough, Massachusetts, U.S.

Playing career
- 1981–1982: UMass
- Position: Nose guard

Coaching career (HC unless noted)
- 1983: Marlboro HS (MA) (assistant)
- 1984–1987: St. Bernard's HS (MA) (assistant)
- 1988–1992: Keefe Technical HS (MA)
- 1993: Murdock HS (MA)
- 1994: Ayer HS (MA)
- 1995: Westfield HS (MA)
- 1996–1997: Amesbury HS (MA)
- 1998: UMass Lowell (OC/RB)
- 1999: UMass Lowell (ST/DL)
- 2000–2001: Worcester State (assistant DC/ILB)
- 2002–2006: Framingham State
- 2007–2013: Worcester State (assoc. HC/DC/DB)
- 2014: Nichols (DC)
- 2015–2018: Nichols (DC/DB)
- 2019–2022: Fitchburg State (DC)
- 2022: Fitchburg State (interim HC)
- 2023–present: Fitchburg State (AHC/DC)

Head coaching record
- Overall: 4–45 (college)

Mark J. Sullivan (born c. 1962 or 1963) is an American college football coach. He is the associate head football coach and defensive coordinator for Fitchburg State University, positions he has held since 2023. Sullivan served as the head football coach at Framingham State University from 2002 to 2006 and as the interim head football coach for Fitchburg State University in 2022.

== Early life and playing career ==
Sullivan grew up in Marlborough, Massachusetts, and attended Marlboro High School. After graduating, he attended the University of Massachusetts Amherst and played college football as a nose guard. His playing career ended following a second knee operation in his second season in 1982.

== Coaching career ==
At 19, Sullivan returned to his alma mater, Marlboro High School, as an assistant football coach. After one season, he moved to St. Bernard's High School as an assistant. In 1988, at only 25 years old, Sullivan was hired as the head football coach for Keefe Technical School, replacing Jim Blair.

From 1993 to 1997, Sullivan had stints as the head coach for Murdock School, Ayer Shirley Regional High School, Westfield High School, and Amesbury High School. In 1998, he moved to the college ranks as the offensive coordinator and running backs coach for UMass Lowell. The next year he transitioned to special teams coordinator and defensive line coach. In 2000, he was hired as the assistant defensive coordinator and inside linebackers coach for Worcester State.

In 2002, Sullivan was hired as the head football coach for Framingham State. He was the head coach for five seasons, amassing an overall record of 4–40, and was ultimately not retained after 2006.

Sullivan returned to Worcester State in 2007 as the associate head coach, defensive coordinator, and defensive backs coach. In 2014, after seven seasons, he was hired as the defensive coordinator for Nichols. The following year he added the role of defensive backs coach.

In 2019, Sullivan was hired as the defensive coordinator for Fitchburg State. In 2022, he took over as interim head coach following Scott Sperone's resignation, leading the team to a 0–5 record. Sullivan was retained for the following season after the hiring of Zach Shaw, reverting to defensive coordinator and adding the role of assistant head coach. After Shaw's resignation, Sullivan was again retained after Izzy Abraham was hired, this time as associate head coach and defensive coordinator.

== Head coaching record ==
=== College ===
Year	Team	Overall	Conference	Standing	Bowl/playoffs
Framingham State Rams (New England Football Conference) (2002–2006)
2002	Framingham State	1–8	1–5	T–5th (Bogan)	
2003	Framingham State	0–9	0–6	8th (Bogan)	
2004	Framingham State	0–9	0–6	7th (Bogan)	
2005	Framingham State	2–7	1–5	6th (Bogan)	
2006	Framingham State	1–7	1–6	T–7th (Bogan)	
Framingham State:		4–40	3–28		
Fitchburg State Falcons (Massachusetts State Collegiate Athletic Conference) (2022)
2022	Fitchburg State	0–5 (Note: Scott Sperone served as Fitchburg State's head coach for the first five games of the 2022 season before he resigned. Sullivan was named interim head coach for the remainder of the season. Fitchburg State finished the year with an overall record of 1–9 and a mark of 0–8 in conference play.)	0–5	9th	
Fitchburg State:		0–5	0–5		
Total:		4–45			
