= James McGuire =

James McGuire may refer to:

- James Washington Lonoikauoalii McGuire (1862–1941), Hawaiian courtier and dressmaker
- Deacon McGuire (James Thomas McGuire, 1863–1936), American baseball player
- James G. Maguire, American Congressman
- James Kennedy McGuire (1868–1923), American politician, mayor of Syracuse, New York
- James McGuire (Irish politician) (1903–1989), Irish Cumann na nGaedhael politician
- James McGuire (soccer) (1911–1974), president of the United States Soccer Federation
- James McGuire (footballer) (1883–?), English footballer
- James McGuire (VC) (1827–1862), Irish recipient of the Victoria Cross
- James McGuire (railways) (1856–1927), commissioner of railways in South Australia
- Jim McGuire (baseball coach), American college baseball coach
- Jim McGuire (shortstop) (1875–1917), American baseball shortstop
- Jim McGuire (American football), American football coach
- Jimmy McGuire, member of the Jeopardy! Clue Crew

== See also ==
- James Maguire (disambiguation)
