= David Flynn =

David Flynn may refer to:

- David Flynn (composer) (born 1977), Irish composer and musician
- David Flynn (Gaelic footballer), Gaelic footballer from Clonown in County Roscommon
- David Flynn (soccer) (born 1989), American soccer player
- Dave Flynn (American football) (born c. 1971), American college football coach
- David Flynn, co-founder of Fusion-io
- David Flynn, engineer designer of RISC architectures, co-recipient of the IEEE/RSE James Clerk Maxwell Medal with Dave Jaggar
