= Euclidean theorem =

Euclidean theorem may refer to:

- Any theorem in Euclidean geometry
- Any theorem in Euclid's Elements, and in particular:
  - Euclid's theorem that there are infinitely many prime numbers
  - Euclid's lemma, also called Euclid's first theorem, on the prime factors of products
  - The Euclid–Euler theorem characterizing the even perfect numbers
  - Geometric mean theorem about right triangle altitude

== See also ==
- Euclidean (disambiguation)
- Euclid (disambiguation)
