= Benjamin Murphy =

Benjamin or Ben Murphy may refer to:

- Ben Murphy (Benjamin Edward Murphy, born 1942), American actor
- B. Frank Murphy (Benjamin Franklin Murphy, 1867–1938), American politician from Ohio
- B. Russell Murphy (Benjamin Russell Murphy, 1889–1957), American athlete and coach
- Ben Murphy (rugby union, born 1996), Welsh rugby union player
- Ben Murphy (rugby union, born 2001), Irish rugby union player
- Ben Murphy (aviator) (born 1975), British pilot
- Ben Murphy (American football), American football coach
