= J. B. Wells =

American football coach

Current position
- Title: Offensive coordinator
- Team: Coast Guard
- Conference: NEWMAC

Biographical details
- Education: Trinity (CT) (1991)

Playing career
- 1987–1990: Trinity (CT)

Coaching career (HC unless noted)
- 1991: Brown (TE)
- 1992–1993: Trinity (CT) (OL)
- 1994–1995: Bates (OL)
- 1996–1997: Chicago (RB)
- 1998: Trinity (CT) (OL)
- 1999–2001: Illinois Wesleyan (OC)
- 2003–2014: Endicott
- 2015–2018: Bowdoin
- 2019–2021: Kingswood Oxford School (CT)
- 2022–present: Coast Guard (OC)

Head coaching record
- Overall: 78–79 (college); 6–10 (high school)
- Bowls: 2–0
- Tournaments: 0–2 (NCAA D-III playoffs)

Accomplishments and honors

Championships
- 2 NEFC (2010, 2013); 3 NEFC Boyd Division (2004, 2010, 2012)

J. B. Wells is an American college football coach. He is the offensive coordinator for the United States Coast Guard Academy, a position he has held since 2022. He was the first head football coach at Endicott College in Beverly, Massachusetts, serving from 2003 to 2014. Wells was the head football coach at Bowdoin College in Brunswick, Maine from 2015 to 2018.

== Head coaching record ==
=== College ===
Year	Team	Overall	Conference	Standing	Bowl/playoffs
Endicott Gulls (New England Football Conference) (2003–2014)
2003	Endicott	4–5	3–3	4th (Boyd)	
2004	Endicott	6–4	5–1	T–1st (Boyd)	
2005	Endicott	7–3	5–1	2nd (Boyd)	
2006	Endicott	6–4	5–2	2nd (Boyd)	
2007	Endicott	3–6	3–4	5th (Boyd)	
2008	Endicott	3–7	2–5	7th (Boyd)	
2009	Endicott	5–5	3–5	T–4th (Boyd)	
2010	Endicott	9–3	6–1	T–1st (Boyd)	L NCAA Division III First Round
2011	Endicott	10–1	6–1	2nd (Boyd)	W ECAC Bowl
2012	Endicott	9–2	6–1	T–1st (Boyd)	W ECAC Bowl
2013	Endicott	8–3	7–0	1st	L NCAA Division III First Round
2014	Endicott	5–5	4–3	4th	
Endicott:		75–48	55–27		
Bowdoin Polar Bears (New England Small College Athletic Conference) (2015–2018)
2015	Bowdoin	2–6	2–6	T–6th	
2016	Bowdoin	0–8	0–8	T–9th	
2017	Bowdoin	0–9	0–9	10th	
2018	Bowdoin	1–8	1–8	9th	
Bowdoin:		3–31	3–31		
Total:		78–79			
National championship Conference title Conference division title or championship game berth

=== High school ===
Year	Team	Overall	Conference	Standing	Bowl/playoffs
Kingswood Oxford School Wyverns () (2019–2021)
2019	Kingswood Oxford School	3–5	1–3	3rd	
2020	No team—COVID-19				
2021	Kingswood Oxford School	3–5	1–3	3rd	
Kingswood Oxford School:		6–10	2–6		
Total:		6–10			
