= Euclid Avenue =

Euclid Avenue may refer to:

- California State Route 83 or Euclid Avenue in San Bernardino County, California
  - Euclid Avenue (Ontario and Upland, California), a historic district
- Euclid Avenue station (San Diego Trolley), California, a railway station
- Euclid Avenue School, Jamestown, New York
- Euclid Avenue station (IND Fulton Street Line), a subway station in New York City
- Euclid Avenue (Cleveland), Ohio
  - Euclid Avenue Historic District (Cleveland, Ohio)
  - Euclid Avenue station (Pennsylvania Railroad)
- Euclid Avenue Historic District (Bristol, Virginia)
