= Walsh Middle School =

Walsh Middle School may refer to:

- Walsh Middle School, Framingham Public School District, Framingham, Massachusetts
- James Garland Walsh Middle School, Round Rock Independent School District, Round Rock, Texas
