= Euclid (disambiguation) =

Euclid generally refers to the ancient Greek mathematician Euclid of Alexandria (3rd century BC), who wrote a work on geometry called the Elements.

Euclid, Euclides, or Eucleides may also refer to:

== People ==
- Euclid of Megara (c. 435 BC–c. 365 BC), ancient Greek philosopher
- Eucleides, archon of Athens (5th century BC)
- Euclid Bertrand (born 1974), Dominican former footballer
- Euclid Cummings (born 1991), American football player
- Euclides da Cunha (1866–1909), Brazilian sociologist
- Euclid James Sherwood (1942–2011), American musician
- Euclid Kyurdzidis (born 1968), Russian actor
- Euclid Tsakalotos (born 1960), Greek economist and Minister of Finance
- Nicholas Euclid (1932–2007), Australian rugby league player, coach, and official

== Mathematics, science, and technology ==
- Euclid (computer program)
- Euclid (programming language)
- Euclid, a space telescope built by ESA, launched in 2023
- Euclid, a computer system used by Euroclear
- Euclid Contest, a maths competition held by the Centre for Education in Mathematics and Computing
- Euclidean space
- 4354 Euclides

== Higher education ==
- EUCLID (university), an intergovernmental organization
- Euclid Consortium, a group of universities
- Project Euclid, a university collaboration to assist publishing in math and statistics

== Places in the United States ==
- Euclid, Minnesota, an unincorporated community
- Euclid, Ohio, a city and suburb of Cleveland
- Euclid, Pennsylvania, an unincorporated community
- Euclid, West Virginia, an unincorporated community
- Euclid Township, Polk County, Minnesota
- Euclid Township, Cuyahoga County, Ohio, in existence from 1809 to 1917

== Fiction ==
- Euclid, a supercomputer built by the fictional character Maximillian Cohen in the 1998 film Pi
- Euclid, a town in the game Tales of Phantasia
- Euclid, an object classification in the SCP Foundation storytelling project

== Other uses ==
- Euclid Avenue (disambiguation), several streets in the United States, as well as transit stations and a school
- Euclid Apartments, listed on the National Register of Historic Places in Washington, D.C.
- Euclid Tree, a giant Sequoia in California
- Euclid Trucks, a company specialized in heavy equipment for earthmoving
- Village of Euclid, Ohio v. Ambler Realty Co., a U.S. Supreme Court case relevant to contemporary land use and police power issues; the legal precedent for zoning
- "Euclid", a song by Sleep Token from Take Me Back to Eden

== See also ==
- Euclidean (disambiguation)
