= Paul McGonagle (disambiguation) =

Paul McGonagle may refer to

- Paul McGonagle (1939–1974), Irish-American mobster and leader
- Paul McGonagle (American football), American football coach

== See also ==
- Paul McGonigle, Irish Gaelic footballer
