= DeWall =

DeWall is a surname, likely of Dutch origin. Notable people with the surname include:

- Caleb DeWall (born 1979), better known as Silas Young, American professional wrestler
- Kevin DeWall (born 1977), American football coach
- Richard DeWall (1926-2016), American cardiothoracic surgeon
