= Scott Sperone =

American football coach (born 1979)

Current position
- Title: Special teams coordinator & safeties coach
- Team: Kean
- Conference: NJAC

Biographical details
- Born: c. 1979 (age 46–47)
- Education: Springfield College (2001)

Playing career
- 1997–2000: Springfield
- Position: Safety

Coaching career (HC unless noted)
- 2000: Springfield (student volunteer)
- 2001: King's (PA) (OLB)
- 2002–2003: Springfield (GA)
- 2004: Stonehill (DB)
- 2005: Williams (WR)
- 2006–2007: Brown (RB)
- 2008–2010: Merrimack (DC/DB)
- 2011–2016: FDU–Florham (DC/DB)
- 2017–2019: WPI (DC)
- 2020–2022: Fitchburg State
- 2023–present: Kean (STC/S)

Head coaching record
- Overall: 1–14

Scott Sperone (born c. 1979) is an American college football coach. He is the special teams coordinator and safeties coach for Kean University, positions he has held since 2023. He was the head football coach for Fitchburg State University from 2020 to 2022. He also coached for Springfield, King's, Stonehill, Williams, Brown, Merrimack, Fairleigh Dickinson–Florham, and WPI. He played college football for Springfield as a safety.

Sperone resigned from Fitchburg State following verbal abuse allegations.

== Head coaching record ==
Year	Team	Overall	Conference	Standing	Bowl/playoffs
Fitchburg State Falcons (Massachusetts State Collegiate Athletic Conference) (2020–2022)
2020–21	No team—COVID-19				
2021	Fitchburg State	0–10	0–8	9th	
2022	Fitchburg State	1–4 (Note: Sperone resigned after five games and was replaced by Mark Sullivan for the remainder of the season.)	0–2		
Fitchburg State:		1–14	0–10		
Total:		1–14			
