= Paul McGonagle (American football) =

American football coach (born 1975)

Current position
- Title: Head coach
- Team: Endicott
- Conference: CNE
- Record: 72–16

Biographical details
- Born: May 11, 1975 (age 51); Melrose, Massachusetts, U.S.

Playing career
- 1995–1998: Kentucky
- Positions: Tight end, offensive lineman

Coaching career (HC unless noted)
- 1999: Northeastern (TE/RB)
- 2000–2001: Eastern Kentucky (TE/RB)
- 2002: Bucknell (RB)
- 2003: Bentley (OC/OL)
- 2004–2006: Stony Brook (OC)
- 2007–2010: Fitchburg State
- 2011–2012: Endicott (OA)
- 2013: Assumption (OC/QB)
- 2014: Assumption (AHC/OC/QB)
- 2015–2017: Assumption (AHC/OC/TE)
- 2018–present: Endicott

Head coaching record
- Overall: 84–43
- Bowls: 1–1
- Tournaments: 1–5 (NCAA D-III playoffs)

Accomplishments and honors

Championships
- 1 CCC Football (2021); 5 CCC/CNE (2022–2026)

Paul Andrew McGonagle (born May 11, 1975) is an American college football coach. He is the head football coach for Endicott College, a position he has held since 2018. McGonagle was the head football coach at Fitchburg State University from 2007 to 2010.

== Head coaching record ==
Year	Team	Overall	Conference	Standing	Bowl/playoffs	D3^{#}	AFCA^{°}
Fitchburg State Falcons (New England Football Conference) (2007–2010)
2007	Fitchburg State	3–6	3–4	T–5th (Bogan)			
2008	Fitchburg State	4–6	4–3	T–3rd (Bogan)			
2009	Fitchburg State	4–6	2–5	T–6th (Bogan)			
2010	Fitchburg State	1–9	1–6	T–7th (Bogan)			
Fitchburg State:		12–27	10–18				
Endicott Gulls (Commonwealth Coast Football) (2018–2021)
2018	Endicott	7–4	5–1	T–2nd	L New England		
2019	Endicott	9–2	6–1	1st	W New England		
2020–21	No team—COVID-19						
2021	Endicott	8–3	5–1	1st	L NCAA Division III First Round		
Endicott Gulls (Commonwealth Coast Conference / Conference of New England) (2022–present)
2022	Endicott	10–1	6–0	1st	L NCAA Division III First Round		25
2023	Endicott	9–2	5–0	1st	L NCAA Division III First Round	15	15
2024	Endicott	10–2	5–0	1st	L NCAA Division III Second Round	10	12
2025	Endicott	9–2	7–0	1st	L NCAA Division III Second Round		24
2026	Endicott	10–0	7–0	1st			
Endicott:		72–16	46–3				
Total:		84–43					
National championship Conference title Conference division title or championship game berth
