= Dave Secino =

American football coach (born 1955)

Biographical details
- Born: c. 1955 (age 70–71)

Playing career
- 1974–1977: Maine
- Position: Offensive lineman

Coaching career (HC unless noted)
- ?–1983: Fitchburg HS (MA) (assistant)
- 1984–1989: Fitchburg State
- 1990–1994: Monty Tech HS (MA)

Head coaching record
- Overall: 4–49 (college)

David Secino (often misspelled as Cecino; born c. 1955) is an American former football coach. He was the head coach for the Fitchburg State Falcons football team from 1984 to 1989. He also coached for Fitchburg High School and Montachusett Regional Vocational Technical School. He played college football for Maine as an offensive lineman.

Secino was the leader of the 1989 team that snapped the school's NCAA-record losing streak at 36 games as they beat Southeastern Massachusetts 33–7.

== Head coaching record ==
=== College ===
| Year | Team | Overall | Conference | Standing | Bowl/playoffs |
|---|---|---|---|---|---|
Fitchburg State Falcons (NCAA Division III independent) (1984–1985)
| 1984 | Fitchburg State | 0–9 | | | |
| 1985 | Fitchburg State | 1–7 | | | |
Fitchburg State Falcons (New England Football Conference) (1986–1989)
| 1986 | Fitchburg State | 0–9 | 0–9 | 11th | |
| 1987 | Fitchburg State | 0–8 | 0–5 | 6th (South) | |
| 1988 | Fitchburg State | 0–9 | 0–6 | 7th (South) | |
| 1989 | Fitchburg State | 3–7 | 2–4 | T–5th (South) | |
| Fitchburg State: | | 4–49 | 2–24 | | |
| Total: | | 4–49 | | | |
