= Izzy Abraham =

American football coach (born c. 1989)

Current position
- Title: Head coach
- Team: Fitchburg State
- Conference: MASCAC
- Record: 5–15

Biographical details
- Born: c. 1989 (age 36–37); Canton, Massachusetts, U.S.
- Education: Endicott College (2012)

Playing career
- 2008–2011: Endicott
- Positions: Fullback, cornerback

Coaching career (HC unless noted)
- 2012–2013: Stonehill (RB)
- 2014: Stonehill (ST/RB)
- 2015: Susquehanna (RB)
- 2016 (summer): Tennessee Titans (assistant RB)
- 2017–2018: American International (RB)
- 2019 (summer): Los Angeles Chargers (assistant RB)
- 2019–2021: Holy Cross (RB)
- 2022 (summer): Jacksonville Jaguars (assistant TE)
- 2022–2023: American International (AHC/ST/RB)
- 2024–present: Fitchburg State

Administrative career (AD unless noted)
- 2015–2016: Cleveland Browns (scout)

Head coaching record
- Overall: 5–15

Israel Abraham (born c. 1990) is an American football coach. He is the head football coach for Fitchburg State University, a position he has held since 2024. He also coached for Stonehill, Susquehanna, American International, and Holy Cross. He served as a summer intern for the Tennessee Titans, Los Angeles Chargers, and the Jacksonville Jaguars of the National Football League (NFL). He played college football for Endicott as a fullback and cornerback.

== Head coaching record ==
Year	Team	Overall	Conference	Standing	Bowl/playoffs
Fitchburg State Falcons (Massachusetts State Collegiate Athletic Conference) (2024–present)
2024	Fitchburg State	2–8	1–8	10th	
2025	Fitchburg State	3–7	2–7	9th	
2026	Fitchburg State	0–0	0–0		
Fitchburg State:		5–15	3–15		
Total:		5–15			
