= Massachusetts Bay Community College =

Public college in Wellesley, Massachusetts, US

Coordinates: 42°18′42.16″N 71°15′49.51″W

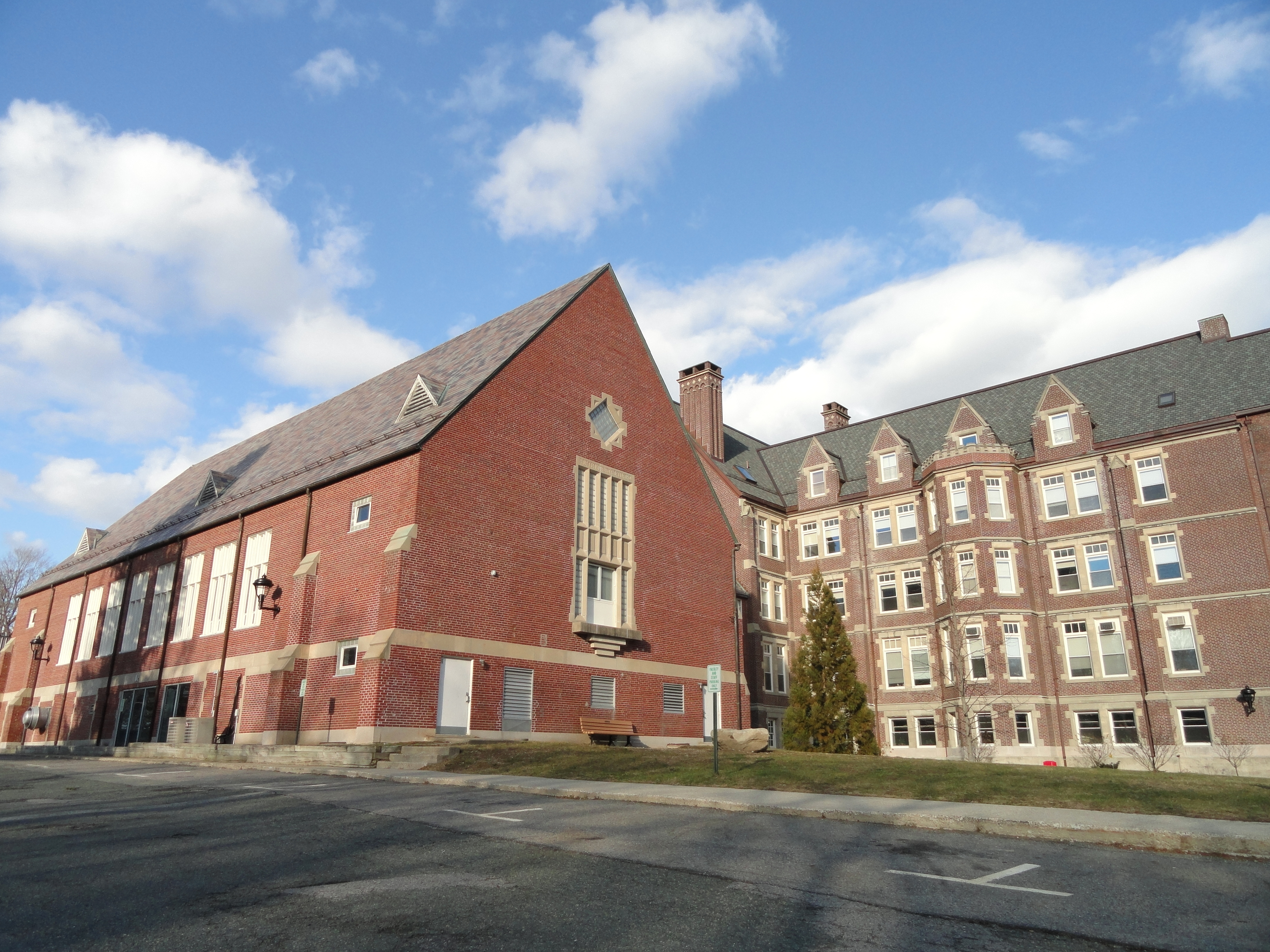
- Wellesley Campus
- Motto: Start here. Go anywhere.
- Type: Public community college
- Established: 1961
- Accreditation: NECHE
- President: David Podell
- Administrative staff: 74 (full-time); 250 (part-time)
- Students: 4,400
- Location: Wellesley; Framingham; Ashland, Massachusetts, United States
- Campus: Suburban
- Colors: Navy
- Mascot: Buccaneer
- Website: www.massbay.edu

Massachusetts Bay Community College (colloquially known as MassBay) is a public community college in Norfolk and Middlesex Counties. Founded in 1961, MassBay currently serves more than 4,400 full-time and part-time students on its three locations: Wellesley, Ashland, and Framingham. MassBay offers more than 70 degree and certificate programs aimed at helping students transfer to a four-year college or university or towards direct placement into a career. Massachusetts Bay Community College is accredited by the New England Commission of Higher Education.

== History ==
Massachusetts Bay Community College was chartered in February 1961 by the Commonwealth of Massachusetts as one of the first community colleges in Massachusetts. MassBay opened with temporary campuses in Watertown, in a property leased from Raytheon, and Boston, and at the time served just several hundred students. In 1975, the college moved to its permanent location in Wellesley Hills, on the campus of the former Elizabeth Seton High School. In 1990, MassBay entered into a lease with Framingham Public Schools for a second campus in Framingham to house its health sciences and human services programs. In 2001, MassBay opened its Automotive Technology Center in Ashland. In January 2024, the college opened a new 68,000 square foot, LEED Gold Certified MassBay Center for Health Sciences, Early Childhood, and Human Services in Framingham.
