= Chris Nugai =

American football coach (born 1969)

Biographical details
- Born: c. 1969 (age 56–57); Waterbury, Connecticut, U.S.
- Education: Worcester State University (1992); Fitchburg State University (2001)

Playing career
- 1988: American International
- 1989–1991: Worcester State
- Position: Quarterback

Coaching career (HC unless noted)
- 1993: King's (PA) (intern)
- 1994: Maine (assistant)
- 1995: Yale (off. assistant)
- 1996–1997: Fitchburg State
- 1998: Coast Guard (OC/QB/WR)
- 1999–2001: Tufts (OC/QB/WR)
- 2002: Columbia (QB)
- 2003–2004: Harvard (RB)
- 2005: UConn (GA)
- 2005: Hamilton Tiger-Cats (GC)
- 2006–2011: Columbia (RB/ST)
- 2010: Winnipeg Blue Bombers (GC)
- 2012–2013: Holy Cross (TE/FB)
- 2014–2015: New Haven (ST/TE)
- 2016 (spring): Woburn HS (MA)
- 2016–2019: New Haven (OL)
- 2020–2022: Wagner (OC)
- 2023: Post (assistant)

Head coaching record
- Overall: 3–16

Christopher Nugai (born c. 1969) is an American college football coach. He was the head football coach for Fitchburg State College—now known as Fitchburg State University—from 1996 to 1997. He also coached for King's (PA), Maine, Yale, Coast Guard, Tufts, Columbia, Harvard, UConn, the Hamilton Tiger-Cats and Winnipeg Blue Bombers of the Canadian Football League (CFL), Holy Cross, New Haven, Wagner, and Post. He played college football for American International and Worcester State as a quarterback.

== Head coaching record ==
Year	Team	Overall	Conference	Standing	Bowl/playoffs
Fitchburg State Falcons (New England Football Conference) (1996–1997)
1996	Fitchburg State	0–9	0–8	9th	
1997	Fitchburg State	3–7	1–7	8th	
Fitchburg State:		3–16	1–15		
Total:		3–16			
