= Intermediate Math League of Eastern Massachusetts =

The Intermediate Math League of Eastern Massachusetts (or IMLEM) is a math league for middle schools across Eastern Massachusetts. A brief history of IMLEM is given in its By-Laws:

The first contest of the Intermediate Math League was held in March, 1965. This meeting was viewed as an experiment to determine the advisability of this type of academic competition for the age levels of students in grades 7 through 9. Enthusiasm and commitment to the contest idea spread quickly. Throughout the years, the League has grown in membership from ten to forty three schools. Students have the honor of representing their school in an academic competition, while interacting academically and socially with students from other communities. Advisors have the opportunity to discuss and compare their programs in mathematics. In 1986, the academic competition was redesigned to accommodate the regional change from junior high schools to middle schools. Teams then consisted of students in grades 7 and 8. Sixth grade students were allowed to participate as seventh graders.

== Schools ==
As of 2017, 86 different schools attend the competition. Each school is allowed to send more than 1 team and each team can consist of at most 10 people. Alternates, people who are not officially part of team, can be taken too. There are a total of 15 different geographic clusters of schools and there is even a cluster of schools from Pennsylvania. The schools are then separated into different divisions with the schools in each division be approximately the same level. Schools can then make their way up through divisions to try to get into the top division, which is the Lexington Division. In total there are 13 divisions.

Schools may send more than one team, however no student can compete on more than one team in a year. Also, a school may send alternates to gain the experience of a meet.

== Meets ==
IMLEM has five meets every year, one in October, November, January, February, and March. For the first three meets, no calculators or external aids of any sort are allowed for any round. However, for the last two meets, calculators without programming or graphing capabilities, and without a QWERTY keyboard, are allowed for all rounds.

Meets are held at distinct locations for each of the ten geographic clusters. Schools within the clusters generally hold at most one of the meets. Each of the meets are generally held on the same day by all clusters; however for scheduling conflicts, schools may host meets on other days.

There are five individual categories, and they are: Mystery, Geometry, Number Theory, Arithmetic, and Algebra. Each individual round contains three questions, varying in content but focusing on topics published by the test writer. Questions in individual rounds are worth 2 points each. (Before this was the case, questions would be worth the question number, i.e., one point for question one, two points for question two and three points for question three.) Students are given 10 minutes to complete the round, along with a 1-minute warning.

The sixth category is a 15-minute team round that consists of six or nine questions (The amount of questions is unknown before the round starts). The entire team collaborates to solve each of the questions. The questions are usually based on topics from the five individual rounds with some extra knowledge required to solve other questions.

Students take three individual categories, and no more than six students on a team may take a single category. In a round, the maximum score for an individual is 6, and the maximum score for a team is 36. It follows that the maximum individual score is 18, and the maximum team score is 216.

18s are not uncommon, and each meet sees many individuals who get 18s. Coming into the 2004-05 school year, a score above 200 had been achieved only five times: twice by Diamond Middle School, twice by Clarke Middle School, and the long-standing record of 205 set by Marblehead in 1983. (This was when individual rounds were weighted 1-2-3 instead of 2-2-2.) The first meet of 2004-05 saw two teams score 200: Clarke scored 200, and Diamond shattered the record by scoring 212. Diamond scored perfect 36s in each of the rounds except for round 3 (number theory), in which 2 students each got a question wrong.

The 2007-08 season saw Clarke Middle School shatter many records, recent and not alike. Firstly, Clarke scored 1006 for the year, which is an average of 201.2 per meet. This broke the previous record set by Diamond back in the 2004-05 year. Secondly, they outscored second place Diamond by 122 points, also breaking a Diamond record, this one set in 2005-06. This is in part an effect of the test-writers' push to make problems easier so as to encourage more participation.

Each of the meets follows the following basic format. Each of the teams arrive usually by 3:15, and after snacks, the five individual rounds are held in succession. After that, a fifteen-minute team round is conducted. For all rounds, alternates and regulars are split. Finally, awards are distributed and teams should depart around 5:30.

== Topics ==
IMLEM Topics (As of 2007-08)
Meet	Cat 1	Cat 2	Cat 3	Cat 4	Cat 5
Meet	Mystery	Geometry	Number Theory	Arithmetic	Algebra
1	?	Angle measures in plane figures including supplements and complements	Divisibility rules, factors, primes, composites	Order of operations; mean, median, mode; rounding; statistics	Simplifying and evaluating expressions; solving equations with 1 unknown including identities
2	?	Area and perimeter of polygons	GCF, LCM, prime factorization	Fractions, terminating and repeating decimals, percents	Word problems with 1 unknown; working with formulas; reasoning in number sentences
3	?	Properties of polygons; Pythagorean Theorem	Bases, scientific notation	Integral powers (positive, negative, and zero), roots up to the sixth	Absolute value; inequalities in one variable including interpreting line graphs
4	?	Properties of circles	Modular arithmetic, series and sequences	Percent applications: find percent of a number, find what percent a number is of another, find a number where the percent of that number is known, find percent of change, compound interest	Word problems (linear, including direct proportions or systems)
5	?	Solid geometry (volume and surface area)	Set theory, Venn diagrams	Combinatorics and Probability	Solving quadratics with rational solutions, including word problems

== Divisions ==
IMLEM Divisions (As of 2013-14)
Euclidean	Meadowbrook - Weston		3
Euclidean	Jonas Clarke Middle School		8
Euclidean	Newton - Brown		7
Euclidean	Belmont Middle School		6
Euclidean	Weston Middle School		6
Pythagorean	Westborough - Gibbons	1 and 2	9
Pythagorean	Sharon Middle School		8
Pythagorean	William Diamond Middle School	1 and 2	10
Pythagorean	Stony Brook Middle School		3
Pythagorean	Sarah Gibbons Middle School		9
Wellesley Middle School		9	
Pascal	Andover - Doherty		
Pascal	Andover - West		6
Pascal	Newton - Bigelow		
Pascal	Worcester Academy		9
Pascal	Newton - Oak Hill		7
Fibonacci	Sudbury Curtis MS	1 and 2	11
Fibonacci	Wayland		3
Fibonacci	Reading - Parker		4
Fibonacci	Lincoln		8
Fibonacci	BB&N		8
Fibonacci	Jewish Community Day School		7
Da Vinci	Northborough - Melican		9
Da Vinci	Masconomet Regional		12
Da Vinci	Natick - Wilson	1 and 2	3
Da Vinci	Reading - Coolidge 1		4
Da Vinci	Framingham - Walsh		11
Da Vinci	Melrose - Veterans Memorial Middle School		4
Gauss	Newton - Day		
Gauss	Concord		11
Gauss	Andover - Wood Hill		6
Gauss	Franklin - Horace Mann	1 and 2	10
Gauss	Hampstead		1
Mosca	Amesbury		1
Mosca	Shore Country Day		2
Mosca	Marblehead - Veterans		5
Mosca	Brookline - Heath		7
Mosca	Norfolk - King Philip MS		10
Hypatia	Beverly - Briscoe		2
Hypatia	Tewksbury - Wynn		6
Hypatia	Swampscott		5
Hypatia	Triton Regional MS		1
Hypatia	Ipswich		12
Gardner	Manchester Essex	1 and 2	12
Gardner	Mansfield - Qualters	1 and 2	10
Gardner	Lynnfield		4
Gardner	Hamilton Wenham - Miles River Regional		12
Gardner	Newburyport Nock	1 and 2	1
Gardner	Natick Kennedy		3
Noether	Beverly - Waring School		2
Noether	Stoneham		4
Noether	West Newbury - Pentucket Regional		1
Noether	St. Mary Danvers	1 and 2	2
Noether	Norwood Coakley		10
Ramanujan	Reading Coolidge 2		4
Ramanujan	Rockport		12
Ramanujan	Austin Prep		4
Ramanujan	Lynn Pickering	1 and 2	5
Ramanujan	St. John Peabody		2
Liu Hui	Framingham - Fuller		11
Liu Hui	Lynn Breed	1 and 2	5
Liu Hui	Lynn Marshall		5
Liu Hui	Abby Kelley Foster Charter		
Liu Hui	Framingham Cameron		
undecided	Saugus		5
undecided	Cambridge Friends School		7
undecided	Westford - Blanchard		6

† Year indicated is that of the end of that school year (i.e., 2007 represents the 2006-07 school year).
