= Vin Keough =

American football coach (born 1944)

Biographical details
- Born: c. 1944 (age 81–82); Buffalo, New York, U.S.
- Education: Ithaca College (1967)

Playing career
- 1963–1966: Ithaca
- Position: Defensive lineman

Coaching career (HC unless noted)
- 1971–1973: Lawrence HS (MA)
- 1974–?: Whittier Regional Vocational Technical (MA)
- 1990–1992: Fitchburg State
- 1994–?: UMass Boston (OC/OL)

Head coaching record
- Overall: 4–23 (college)

Vincent Keough (born c. 1944) is an American former football coach. He was the head coach for the Fitchburg State Falcons football team from 1989 to 1992. He also coached for Lawrence High School, Whittier Regional Vocational Technical High School, and UMass Boston. He played college football for Ithaca as a defensive lineman.

== Head coaching record ==
=== College ===
Year	Team	Overall	Conference	Standing	Bowl/playoffs
Fitchburg State Falcons (New England Football Conference) (1990–1992)
1990	Fitchburg State	2–7	2–4	T–4th (South)	
1991	Fitchburg State	2–7	1–5	T–6th (South)	
1992	Fitchburg State	0–9	0–8	9th	
Fitchburg State:		4–23	3–17		
Total:		4–23			
