= James Maguire =

James Maguire may refer to:

- James G. Maguire (1853–1920), American politician
- James Maguire (basketball) (born 1939), Canadian basketball player
- James Rochfort Maguire (1855–1925), British imperialist and Irish Nationalist politician and MP
- James Maguire (rugby union) (1886–1966), New Zealand rugby union player
- Jim Maguire (Irish footballer)
- Jim Maguire (Australian footballer) (1918–1990), Australian rules football player (Hawthorn)
- Jim Maguire (footballer, born 1930) (1930–2020), Scottish footballer (Rochdale AFC)
- Jamie Maguire, character of the British television drama series Shameless
- Jim Maguire (cyclist), Northern Ireland cyclist
