= Patrick Haverty =

American football coach

Biographical details
- Education: Worcester State University (1991)

Coaching career (HC unless noted)
- 1992–1996: Leominster HS (MA) (assistant)
- 1996–1997: Fitchburg State (DC)
- 1998–1999: UMass Lowell (OC)
- 2000–2001: North Middlesex Regional HS (MA)
- 2002–2006: Fitchburg State
- 2011–2017: Fitchburg State
- 2023–2024: Bentley (off. assistant)

Head coaching record
- Overall: 62–59 (college)
- Bowls: 0–3

Accomplishments and honors

Championships
- 2 NEFC Bogan Division (2004–2005)

Patrick Haverty is an American college football coach. He was the head football coach for Fitchburg State University from 2002 to 2006 and 2011 to 2017. He was previously an assistant coach for Leominster High School, UMass Lowell, North Middlesex Regional High School, and Bentley

== Head coaching record ==
=== College ===
Year	Team	Overall	Conference	Standing	Bowl/playoffs
Fitchburg State Falcons (New England Football Conference) (2002–2006)
2002	Fitchburg State	5–4	4–2	3rd (Bogan)	
2003	Fitchburg State	5–4	3–3	4th (Bogan)	
2004	Fitchburg State	8–4	6–0	1st (Bogan)	
2005	Fitchburg State	8–3	6–0	1st (Bogan)	
2006	Fitchburg State	4–5	3–4	T–4th (Bogan)	
Fitchburg State Falcons (New England Football Conference) (2011–2012)
2011	Fitchburg State	2–8	1–6	8th (Bogan)	
2012	Fitchburg State	2–8	1–6	7th (Bogan)	
Fitchburg State Falcons (Massachusetts State Collegiate Athletic Conference) (2013–2017)
2013	Fitchburg State	6–4	5–3	T–3rd	
2014	Fitchburg State	6–4	4–4	T–4th	
2015	Fitchburg State	8–3	6–2	T–2nd	L Robert M. "Scotty" Whitelaw Bowl
2016	Fitchburg State	5–5	3–5	T–6th	
2017	Fitchburg State	3–7	2–6	T–7th	
Fitchburg State:		62–59	44–41		
Total:		62–59			
National championship Conference title Conference division title or championship game berth
