= Euclidean =

Euclidean (or, less commonly, Euclidian) is an adjective derived from the name of Euclid, an ancient Greek mathematician.

== Geometry ==
- Euclidean space, the two-dimensional plane and three-dimensional space of Euclidean geometry as well as their higher dimensional generalizations
- Euclidean geometry, the study of the properties of Euclidean spaces
- Non-Euclidean geometry, systems of points, lines, and planes analogous to Euclidean geometry but without uniquely determined parallel lines
- Euclidean distance, the distance between pairs of points in Euclidean spaces
- Euclidean ball, the set of points within some fixed distance from a center point

== Number theory ==
- Euclidean division, the division which produces a quotient and a remainder
- Euclidean algorithm, a method for finding greatest common divisors
- Extended Euclidean algorithm, a method for solving the Diophantine equation ax + by = d where d is the greatest common divisor of a and b
- Euclid's lemma: if a prime number divides a product of two numbers, then it divides at least one of those two numbers
- Euclidean domain, a ring in which Euclidean division may be defined, which allows Euclid's lemma to be true and the Euclidean algorithm and the extended Euclidean algorithm to work

== Other ==
- Euclidean relation, a property of binary relations related to transitivity
- Euclidean distance map, a digital image in which each pixel value represents the Euclidean distance to an obstacle
- Euclidean rhythm, a method of distributing beats across musical steps based on Euclid's algorithm
- Euclidean zoning, a system of land use management modeled after the zoning code of Euclid, Ohio
- Euclidean division of the Intermediate Math League of Eastern Massachusetts

== See also ==
- Euclid (disambiguation)
- Euclid's Elements, a 13-book mathematical treatise written by Euclid, that includes both geometry and number theory
- Euclideon, an Australian computer graphics company
