= Fitchburg State Falcons football =

College football team

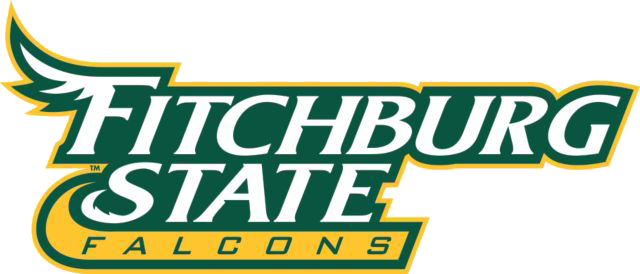
- First season: 1984; 42 years ago
- Athletic director: Matthew Burke
- Head coach: Izzy Abraham; 2nd season, 5–15 (.250)
- Location: Fitchburg, Massachusetts
- Stadium: Elliot Field (capacity: 1,200)
- NCAA division: Division III
- Conference: MASCAC
- Colors: Green and yellow
- All-time record: 130–293–1 (.308)
- Bowl record: 0–3 (.000)

Division championships
- 2 NEFC Bogan Division (2004–2005)
- Rivalries: Worcester State (Sterling Cup)
- Mascot: Falcons
- Website: fitchburgfalcons.com

The Fitchburg State Falcons football team represents Fitchburg State University in college football at the NCAA Division III level. The Falcons are members of the Massachusetts State Collegiate Athletic Conference, fielding its team in the Massachusetts State Collegiate Athletic Conference since 2013. The Falcons play their home games at Elliot Field in Fitchburg, Massachusetts.

Fitchburg State is known for the longest college football losing streak at the time, which ended in 1989 after thirty-plus losses. The school was featured in many news sources, such as The New York Times, ESPN, and many local newspapers. Fitchburg State defeated Southeastern Massachusetts on October 14, 1989, by the score of 33–7. Thanks to notable plays by the defence, including a recovered fumble by Paul Camick, a sophomore at the time, it was the first Fitchburg State win in over four years. In the ensuing celebrations at Fitchburg, five people were arrested.

On September 9, 2023, Taylor Crout became the first female football player to play a non-kicking position in an NCAA game at any level, which she did for the Falcons as a cornerback.

The Falcons’ head coach is Izzy Abraham, who took over the position for the 2024 season.

== Conference affiliations ==
- New England Football Conference (1986–2012)
- Massachusetts State Collegiate Athletic Conference (2013–present)

== Championships ==
=== Division championships ===
Fitchburg State claims 2 division titles, the most recent of which came in 2005.

| Year | Division | Coach | Overall Record | Conference Record | Opponent | CG result |
|---|---|---|---|---|---|---|
| 2004 | NEFC Bogan | Patrick Haverty | 8–4 | 6–0 | Curry | L 7–17 |
| 2005 | NEFC Bogan | Patrick Haverty | 8–3 | 6–0 | Curry | L 7–14 |

=== Bowl games ===
Fitchburg State has participated in three bowl games, and has a record of 0–3.

| Season | Coach | Bowl | Opponent | Result |
|---|---|---|---|---|
| 2004 | Patrick Haverty | ECAC Bowl | Springfield | L 7–53 |
| 2005 | Patrick Haverty | ECAC Bowl | Bridgewater State | L 17–34 |
| 2015 | Patrick Haverty | ECAC Bowl | Alfred | L 10–11 |

== List of head coaches ==
=== Key ===
Key to symbols in coaches list
| General | | Overall | | Conference | | Postseason (Note: Although the first Rose Bowl Game was played in 1902, it has been continuously played since the 1916 game, and is recognized as the oldest bowl game by the NCAA. "—" indicates any season prior to 1916 when postseason games were not played.) | |
|---|---|---|---|---|---|---|---|
| No. | Order of coaches (Note: A running total of the number of head coaches, with coaches who served separate tenures being counted only once. Interim head coaches are represented with "Int" and are not counted in the running total. "—" indicates the team played but either without a coach or no coach is on record. "X" indicates an interim year without play.) | GC | Games coached | CW | Conference wins | PW | Postseason wins |
| DC | Division championships | OW | Overall wins | CL | Conference losses | PL | Postseason losses |
| CC | Conference championships | OL | Overall losses | CT | Conference ties | PT | Postseason ties |
| NC | National championships | OT | Overall ties (Note: Overtime rules in college football were introduced in 1996, making ties impossible in the period since.) | C% | Conference winning percentage | | |
| † | Elected to the College Football Hall of Fame | O% | Overall winning percentage (Note: When computing the win–loss percentage, a tie counts as half a win and half a loss.) | | | | |

=== Coaches ===
List of head football coaches showing season(s) coached, overall records, and conference records
| No. | Name | Season(s) | GC | OW | OL | OT | O% | CW | CL | CT | C% |
|---|---|---|---|---|---|---|---|---|---|---|---|
| 1 | Dave Secino | 1984–1989 | 53 | 4 | 49 | 0 | 0.058 | 2 | 24 | 0 | 0.058 |
| 2 | Vin Keough | 1990–1992 | 27 | 4 | 23 | 0 | 0.148 | 3 | 17 | 0 | 0.150 |
| 3 | Mike Woessner | 1993–1995 | 47 | 4 | 22 | 1 | 0.167 | 3 | 21 | 0 | 0.125 |
| 4 | Chris Nugai | 1996–1997 | 19 | 3 | 16 | 0 | 0.158 | 1 | 15 | 0 | 0.063 |
| 5 | Dave Flynn | 1998–2001 | 38 | 16 | 22 | 0 | 0.421 | 11 | 13 | 0 | 0.458 |
| 6 | Patrick Haverty | 2002–2006, 2011–2017 | 121 | 62 | 59 | 0 | 0.512 | 44 | 41 | 0 | 0.518 |
| 7 | Paul McGonagle | 2007–2010 | 39 | 12 | 27 | 0 | 0.308 | 10 | 18 | 0 | 0.357 |
| 8 | Jim McGuire | 2018–2019 | 20 | 4 | 16 | 0 | 0.200 | 3 | 13 | 0 | 0.188 |
| 9 | Scott Sperone | 2021–2022 | 15 | 1 | 14 | 0 | 0.067 | 0 | 10 | 0 | .000 |
| 10 | Mark Sullivan | 2022 (interim) | 5 | 0 | 5 | 0 | .000 | 0 | 5 | 0 | .000 |
| 11 | Zach Shaw | 2023 | 10 | 0 | 10 | 0 | .000 | 0 | 8 | 0 | .000 |
| 12 | Izzy Abraham | 2024–present | 0 | 0 | 0 | 0 | – | 0 | 8 | 0 | – |

== Year-by-year results ==
| National champions | Conference champions | Bowl game berth | Playoff berth |

| Season | Year | Head coach | Association | Division | Conference | Record | | | | | | | Postseason | Final ranking |
| Season | Year | Head coach | Association | Division | Conference | Overall | | | Conference | | | | Postseason | Final ranking |
| Season | Year | Head coach | Association | Division | Conference | Win | Loss | Tie | Finish | Win | Loss | Tie | Postseason | Final ranking |
Fitchburg State Falcons
| 1984 | 1984 | Dave Secino | NCAA | Division III | Independent | 0 | 9 | 0 | | | | | — | — |
| 1985 | 1985 | Dave Secino | NCAA | Division III | Independent | 1 | 7 | 0 | | | | | — | — |
| 1986 | 1986 | Dave Secino | NCAA | Division III | NEFC | 0 | 9 | 0 | 11th | 0 | 9 | 0 | — | — |
| 1987 | 1987 | Dave Secino | NCAA | Division III | NEFC | 0 | 8 | 0 | 6th (South Div.) | 0 | 5 | 0 | — | — |
| 1988 | 1988 | Dave Secino | NCAA | Division III | NEFC | 0 | 9 | 0 | 7th (South Div.) | 0 | 6 | 0 | — | — |
| 1989 | 1989 | Dave Secino | NCAA | Division III | NEFC | 3 | 7 | 0 | T–5th (South Div.) | 2 | 4 | 0 | — | — |
| 1990 | 1990 | Vin Keough | NCAA | Division III | NEFC | 2 | 7 | 0 | T–4th (South Div.) | 2 | 4 | 0 | — | — |
| 1991 | 1991 | Vin Keough | NCAA | Division III | NEFC | 2 | 7 | 0 | T–6th (South Div.) | 1 | 5 | 0 | — | — |
| 1992 | 1992 | Vin Keough | NCAA | Division III | NEFC | 0 | 9 | 0 | 9th | 0 | 8 | 0 | — | — |
| 1993 | 1993 | Mike Woessner | NCAA | Division III | NEFC | 0 | 8 | 1 | 9th | 0 | 8 | 0 | — | — |
| 1994 | 1994 | Mike Woessner | NCAA | Division III | NEFC | 3 | 6 | 0 | 7th | 2 | 6 | 0 | — | — |
| 1995 | 1995 | Mike Woessner | NCAA | Division III | NEFC | 1 | 8 | 0 | 9th | 1 | 7 | 0 | — | — |
| 1996 | 1996 | Chris Nugai | NCAA | Division III | NEFC | 0 | 9 | 0 | 9th | 0 | 8 | 0 | — | — |
| 1997 | 1997 | Chris Nugai | NCAA | Division III | NEFC | 3 | 7 | 0 | 8th | 1 | 7 | 0 | — | — |
| 1998 | 1998 | Dave Flynn | NCAA | Division III | NEFC | 3 | 7 | 0 | T–5th (Red Div.) | 2 | 4 | 0 | — | — |
| 1999 | 1999 | Dave Flynn | NCAA | Division III | NEFC | 6 | 4 | 0 | 3rd (Red Div.) | 4 | 2 | 0 | — | — |
| 2000 | 2000 | Dave Flynn | NCAA | Division III | NEFC | 5 | 4 | 0 | 3rd (Bogan Div.) | 4 | 2 | 0 | — | — |
| 2001 | 2001 | Dave Flynn | NCAA | Division III | NEFC | 2 | 7 | 0 | 7th (Bogan Div.) | 1 | 5 | 0 | — | — |
| 2002 | 2002 | Patrick Haverty | NCAA | Division III | NEFC | 5 | 4 | 0 | 3rd (Bogan Div.) | 4 | 2 | 0 | — | — |
| 2003 | 2003 | Patrick Haverty | NCAA | Division III | NEFC | 5 | 4 | 0 | 4th (Bogan Div.) | 3 | 3 | 0 | — | — |
| 2004 | 2004 | Patrick Haverty | NCAA | Division III | NEFC | 8 | 4 | 0 | 1st (Bogan Div.) | 6 | 0 | 0 | L North Atlantic Bowl | — |
| 2005 | 2005 | Patrick Haverty | NCAA | Division III | NEFC | 8 | 3 | 0 | 1st (Bogan Div.) | 6 | 0 | 0 | L Northeast Bowl | — |
| 2006 | 2006 | Patrick Haverty | NCAA | Division III | NEFC | 4 | 5 | 0 | T–4th (Bogan Div.) | 3 | 4 | 0 | — | — |
| 2007 | 2007 | Paul McGonagle | NCAA | Division III | NEFC | 3 | 6 | 0 | T–5th (Bogan Div.) | 3 | 4 | 0 | — | — |
| 2008 | 2008 | Paul McGonagle | NCAA | Division III | NEFC | 4 | 6 | 0 | T–3rd (Bogan Div.) | 4 | 3 | 0 | — | — |
| 2009 | 2009 | Paul McGonagle | NCAA | Division III | NEFC | 4 | 6 | 0 | T–6th (Bogan Div.) | 2 | 5 | 0 | — | — |
| 2010 | 2010 | Paul McGonagle | NCAA | Division III | NEFC | 1 | 9 | 0 | T–7th (Bogan Div.) | 1 | 6 | 0 | — | — |
| 2011 | 2011 | Patrick Haverty | NCAA | Division III | NEFC | 2 | 8 | 0 | 8th (Bogan Div.) | 1 | 6 | 0 | — | — |
| 2012 | 2012 | Patrick Haverty | NCAA | Division III | NEFC | 2 | 8 | 0 | 7th (Bogan Div.) | 1 | 6 | 0 | — | — |
| 2013 | 2013 | Patrick Haverty | NCAA | Division III | NEFC | 6 | 4 | 0 | T–3rd | 5 | 3 | 0 | — | — |
| 2014 | 2014 | Patrick Haverty | NCAA | Division III | MASCAC | 6 | 4 | 0 | T–4th | 4 | 4 | 0 | — | — |
| 2015 | 2015 | Patrick Haverty | NCAA | Division III | MASCAC | 8 | 3 | 0 | T–2nd | 6 | 2 | 0 | L Robert M. "Scotty" Whitelaw Bowl | — |
| 2016 | 2016 | Patrick Haverty | NCAA | Division III | MASCAC | 5 | 5 | 0 | T–6th | 3 | 5 | 0 | — | — |
| 2017 | 2017 | Patrick Haverty | NCAA | Division III | MASCAC | 3 | 7 | 0 | T–7th | 2 | 6 | 0 | — | — |
| 2018 | 2018 | Jim McGuire | NCAA | Division III | MASCAC | 2 | 8 | 0 | 7th | 2 | 6 | 0 | — | — |
| 2019 | 2019 | Jim McGuire | NCAA | Division III | MASCAC | 2 | 8 | 0 | 8th | 1 | 7 | 0 | — | — |
Season canceled due to COVID-19
| 2021 | 2021 | Scott Sperone | NCAA | Division III | MASCAC | 0 | 10 | 0 | 9th | 0 | 8 | 0 | — | — |
| 2022 | 2022 | Scott Sperone (games 1–5); Mark Sullivan (games 6–10) | NCAA | Division III | MASCAC | 1 | 9 | 0 | 9th | 0 | 7 | 0 | — | — |
| 2023 | 2023 | Zach Shaw | NCAA | Division III | MASCAC | 0 | 10 | 0 | 9th | 0 | 8 | 0 | — | — |
| 2024 | 2024 | Izzy Abraham | NCAA | Division III | MASCAC | 2 | 8 | 0 | 10th | 1 | 8 | 0 | — | — |
| 2025 | 2025 | Izzy Abraham | NCAA | Division III | MASCAC | 3 | 7 | 0 | 9th | 2 | 7 | 0 | — | — |
