= Dennis Miller (American football) =

American football coach

Biographical details
- Education: St. Cloud State

Coaching career (HC unless noted)
- 1977–1978: Cathedral HS (MN) (DC)
- 1980–1983: St. Cloud State (DC/LB)
- 1984–1985: BYU (WR/LB)
- 1986–1997: Northern State
- 2000–2012: Wisconsin Lutheran
- 2014–2019: Wisconsin Lutheran

Head coaching record
- Overall: 147–164
- Tournaments: 0–1 (NAIA D-I playoffs)

Accomplishments and honors

Championships
- 2 NIC/NSIC (1990, 1992); 1 NACC (2014)

Awards
- 3× NIC/NSIC Coach of the Year (1986, 1990, 1992)

Dennis Miller is an American former football coach. He served two stints as the head football coach at Wisconsin Lutheran College, from 2000 to 2012 and again from 2014 to 2019. Miller had a brief one-year retirement during the 2013 season. He was inducted into Wisconsin Lutheran College’s Paul F. Knueppel Athletics Hall of Fame in 2025.

Miller previously served as the head coach of Northern State University in Aberdeen, South Dakota from 1986 to 1997, leading a once-moribund team to national prominence and a playoff appearance in 1988.

As an assistant coach at Brigham Young University, Miller was part of the staff that won a national title in 1984.

== Head coaching record ==
Year	Team	Overall	Conference	Standing	Bowl/playoffs
Northern State Wolves (Northern Intercollegiate Conference / Northern Sun Intercollegiate Conference) (1986–1997)
1986	Northern State	9–2	5–1	2nd	
1987	Northern State	7–4	4–2	T–3rd	
1988	Northern State	8–4	5–1	2nd	L NAIA Division I First Round
1989	Northern State	8–2	4–2	T–2nd	
1990	Northern State	7–4	5–1	T–1st	
1991	Northern State	6–5	3–3	4th	
1992	Northern State	6–5	5–1	1st	
1993	Northern State	6–5	4–2	T–2nd	
1994	Northern State	5–6	4–2	3rd	
1995	Northern State	4–7	2–4	T–5th	
1996	Northern State	7–4	4–2	3rd	
1997	Northern State	4–7	3–3	T–3rd	
Northern State:		77–55	48–24		
Wisconsin Lutheran Warriors (NCAA Division III independent) (2000–2001)
2000	Wisconsin Lutheran	3–7			
2001	Wisconsin Lutheran	4–5			
Wisconsin Lutheran Warriors (Michigan Intercollegiate Athletic Association) (2002–2006)
2002	Wisconsin Lutheran	3–7	0–6	7th	
2003	Wisconsin Lutheran	5–5	3–3	T–4th	
2004	Wisconsin Lutheran	2–8	2–5	T–6th	
2005	Wisconsin Lutheran	1–9	1–6	7th	
2006	Wisconsin Lutheran	0–10	0–7	8th	
Wisconsin Lutheran Warriors (Northern Athletics Collegiate Conference) (2007–2012)
2007	Wisconsin Lutheran	2–8	1–6		
2008	Wisconsin Lutheran	4–6	3–4	5th	
2009	Wisconsin Lutheran	5–5	4–3	5th	
2010	Wisconsin Lutheran	6–4	4–3	4th	
2011	Wisconsin Lutheran	6–4	5–2	3rd	
2012	Wisconsin Lutheran	7–3	5–2	3rd	
Wisconsin Lutheran Warriors (Northern Athletics Collegiate Conference) (2014–2019)
2014	Wisconsin Lutheran	7–3	5–1	T–1st	
2015	Wisconsin Lutheran	5–5	4–2	3rd	
2016	Wisconsin Lutheran	5–5	4–2	T–3rd	
2017	Wisconsin Lutheran	3–7	3–3	4th	
2018	Wisconsin Lutheran	2–8	2–5	T–6th	
2019	Wisconsin Lutheran	2–8	2–5	7th	
Wisconsin Lutheran:		72–117	48–65		
Total:		149–172			
National championship Conference title Conference division title or championship game berth
