= Mike Woessner =

American football coach (born 1959)

Biographical details
- Born: c. 1959 (age 66–67); Athol, Massachusetts, U.S.

Coaching career (HC unless noted)
- 1981–1986: Athol HS (MA) (assistant)
- 1987: Athol HS (MA) (OC)
- 1988–1989: Athol HS (MA) (DC)
- 1990: Nichols (OL)
- 1991–1992: Fitchburg State (DL)
- 1993–1995: Fitchburg State
- 1999–2005: Quabbin Regional HS (MA)
- 2006–2013: Gardner HS (MA) (OC)

Head coaching record
- Overall: 4–22–1 (college)

Michael Woessner (born c. 1959) is an American former football coach. He most recently served as the offensive coordinator for Gardner High School from 2006 to 2012. He was previously the head coach for the Fitchburg State Falcons football team from 1993 to 1995 and the Quabbin Regional High School football team from 1999 to 2005. He was previously an assistant coach for Athol High School and Nichols.

== Head coaching record ==
=== College ===
Year	Team	Overall	Conference	Standing	Bowl/playoffs
Fitchburg State Falcons (New England Football Conference) (1993–1995)
1993	Fitchburg State	0–8–1	0–8	9th	
1994	Fitchburg State	3–6	2–6	7th	
1995	Fitchburg State	1–8	1–7	9th	
Fitchburg State:		4–22–1	3–21		
Total:		4–22–1			
