= 2007 Mount Union Purple Raiders football team =

American college football season

2007 Mount Union Purple Raiders football

OAC champion

NCAA Division III Championship, L 21–31 vs. Wisconsin–Whitewater
- Conference: Ohio Athletic Conference

Ranking
- D3Football.com: No. 2
- Record: 14–1 (9–0 OAC)
- Head coach: Larry Kehres (22nd season)
- Offensive coordinator: Jason Candle (1st season)
- Defensive coordinator: Vince Kehres (3rd season)
- Home stadium: Mount Union Stadium

2007 Ohio Athletic Conference football standings
	Conf.			Overall
Team	W		L	W		L
No. 2 Mount Union $^	9	–	0	14	–	1
No. 13 Capital ^	7	–	2	8	–	3
Ohio Northern	6	–	3	7	–	3
Baldwin–Wallace	5	–	4	6	–	4
John Carroll	5	–	4	6	–	4
Otterbein	5	–	4	5	–	5
Heidelberg	3	–	6	4	–	6
Marietta	3	–	6	3	–	7
Wilmington (OH)	2	–	7	2	–	8
Muskingum	0	–	9	0	–	10
$ – Conference champion; ^ – NCAA Division III playoff participant; Rankings from D3football.com

The 2007 Mount Union Purple Raiders Football team represented the University of Mount Union in the 2007 NCAA Division III football season. Led by veteran head coach Larry Kehres, with future NFL wide receivers Pierre Garçon and Cecil Shorts III, The Raiders completed their second consecutive undefeated regular season. The Raiders battled to the Stagg Bowl National Championship for the third consecutive year, but unlike the previous two years, the Raiders were defeated by UW-Whitewater. After the season, Garçon was drafted in the sixth round of the NFL draft by the Indianapolis Colts, for whom he started in Super Bowl XLIV, before being traded to the Washington Redskins and San Francisco 49ers. Shorts entered the NFL in 2011 for the Jacksonville Jaguars.

== Schedule ==
Date	Time	Opponent	Rank	Site	Result	Attendance
September 1	1:00 p.m.	Averett*	No. 1	Mount Union Stadium; Alliance, OH	W 75–7	3,632
September 15	7:00 p.m.	Otterbein	No. 1	Mount Union Stadium; Alliance, OH	W 58–14	4,372
September 22	7:00 p.m.	Muskingum	No. 1	Mount Union Stadium; Alliance, OH	W 62–0	5,672
September 29	1:30 p.m.	at Heidelberg	No. 1	Frost-Kalnow Stadium; Tiffin, OH	W 62–3	1,200
October 6	1:30 p.m.	No. 9 Ohio Northern	No. 1	Dial–Roberson Stadium; Ada, Ohio	W 44–0	5,177
October 13	1:30 p.m.	Wilmington (OH)	No. 1	Mount Union Stadium; Alliance, OH	W 59–0	3,132
October 20	1:30 p.m.	Baldwin–Wallace	No. 1	Mount Union Stadium; Alliance, OH	W 35–0	6,322
October 27	1:30 p.m.	at No. 12 Capital	No. 1	Bernlohr Stadium; Columbus, OH	W 37–0	3,147
November 3	1:30 p.m.	at John Carroll	No. 1	Don Shula Stadium; University Heights, OH	W 53–0	3,312
November 10	1:30 p.m.	Marietta	No. 1	Mount Union Stadium; Alliance, OH	W 57–0	4,132
November 17	12:00 p.m.	Ithaca*	No. 1	Mount Union Stadium; Alliance, OH (NCAA Division III First Round)	W 42–18	2,082
November 24	12:00 p.m.	No. 21 TCNJ*	No. 1	Mount Union Stadium; Alliance, OH (NCAA Division III Second Round)	W 59–7	2,593
December 1	12:00 p.m.	No. 5 St. John Fisher*	No. 1	Mount Union Stadium; Alliance, OH (NCAA Division III Quarterfinal)	W 52–10	2,678
December 8	12:00 p.m.	No. 5 Bethel (MN)*	No. 1	Mount Union Stadium; Alliance, OH (NCAA Division III Semifinal)	W 62–14	2,791
December 15	4:09 p.m.	vs. No. 2 Wisconsin–Whitewater*	No. 1	Salem Football Stadium; Salem, VA (NCAA Division III Championship—Stagg Bowl)	L 21–31	5,099
*Non-conference game; Rankings from D3football.com Poll released prior to the game; All times are in Eastern time
