= Ben Murphy (American football) =

American football coach

Playing career
- 2001–2004: Wisconsin Lutheran
- Position: Defensive lineman

Coaching career (HC unless noted)
- 2006: Wisconsin Lutheran (DL)
- 2007: Northern State (DL)
- 2008–2012: Wisconsin Lutheran (DC)
- 2013: Wisconsin Lutheran
- 2014: Wisconsin Lutheran (DC)

Head coaching record
- Overall: 4–6

Ben Murphy is an American football coach. Most recently, he served as the defensive coordinator at Wisconsin Lutheran College. In 2013, he served as head coach at Wisconsin Lutheran College while Dennis Miller had a one-year retirement.

A four-year player for Wisconsin Lutheran, Murphy spent one year as a defensive line coach at Northern State University in Aberdeen, South Dakota.

== Head coaching record ==
Year	Team	Overall	Conference	Standing	Bowl/playoffs
Wisconsin Lutheran Warriors (Northern Athletics Collegiate Conference) (2013)
2013	Wisconsin Lutheran	4–6	3–3	3rd	
Wisconsin Lutheran:		4–6	3–3		
Total:		4–6			
