= 2007 Wisconsin–Whitewater Warhawks football team =

American college football season

2007 Wisconsin–Whitewater Warhawks football

NCAA Division III champion WIAC champion

Stagg Bowl, W 31–21 vs. Mount Union
- Conference: Wisconsin Intercollegiate Athletic Conference

Ranking
- D3Football.com: No. 1
- Record: 14–1 (7–0 WIAC)
- Head coach: Lance Leipold (1st season)
- Offensive coordinator: Jim Zebrowski (1st season)
- Offensive scheme: Pro-style
- Defensive coordinator: Brian Borland (6th season)
- Base defense: 4–3
- Home stadium: Perkins Stadium

2007 Wisconsin Intercollegiate Athletic Conference football standings
	Conf.			Overall
Team	W		L	W		L
No. 1 Wisconsin–Whitewater $^	7	–	0	14	–	1
No. 12 Wisconsin–Eau Claire ^	5	–	2	9	–	3
Wisconsin–Oshkosh	4	–	3	7	–	3
Wisconsin–Stevens Point	3	–	4	6	–	4
Wisconsin–La Crosse	3	–	4	5	–	4
Wisconsin–Stout	3	–	4	4	–	6
Wisconsin–River Falls	2	–	5	3	–	7
Wisconsin–Platteville	1	–	6	2	–	8
$ – Conference champion; ^ – NCAA Division III playoff participant; Rankings from D3football.com

The 2007 Wisconsin–Whitewater Warhawks football team was an American football team that represented the University of Wisconsin–Whitewater as a member of the Wisconsin Intercollegiate Athletic Conference (WIAC) during the 2007 NCAA Division III football season. In their first season under head coach Lance Leipold, the Warhawks compiled a 14–1 record and won the NCAA Division III national championship. In the Division III playoffs, they defeated Wabash in the quarterfinal, Mary Hardin-Baylor in the semifinal, and Mount Union in the national championship game.

== Schedule ==
Date	Opponent	Rank	Site	Result	Attendance	Source
September 1	at Lakeland*	No. 2	Taylor Memorial Field; Sheboygan, WI	W 41–7	758	
September 15	at St. Cloud State*	No. 2	Husky Stadium; St. Cloud, MN	L 16–26	3,982	
September 22	Wisconsin–Eau Claire	No. 3	Perkins Stadium; Whitewater, WI	W 27–0	5,325	
September 29	at No. 6 Wisconsin–La Crosse	No. 3	Veterans Memorial Stadium; La Crosse, WI	W 35–28	4,853	
October 6	Wisconsin–River Falls	No. 3	Perkins Stadium; Whitewater, WI	W 38–12	6,301	
October 13	Wisconsin–Oshkosh^{†}	No. 3	Perkins Stadium; Whitewater, WI	W 26–14	7,825	
October 20	at No. 20 Wisconsin–Stevens Point	No. 3	Goerke Field; Stevens Point, WI	W 31–14	1,815	
October 27	No. 2 Mary Hardin–Baylor*	No. 3	Perkins Stadium; Whitewater, WI	W 41–14	6,061	
November 3	at Wisconsin–Stout	No. 2	Williams Stadium; Menomonie, WI	W 26–10	2,136	
November 10	Wisconsin–Platteville	No. 2	Perkins Stadium; Whitewater, WI	W 21–7	4,940	
November 17	No. 14 Capital*	No. 2	Perkins Stadium; Whitewater, WI (NCAA Division III First Round)	W 34–14	1,689	
November 24	No. 20 North Central (IL)*	No. 2	Perkins Stadium; Whitewater, WI (NCAA Division III Second Round)	W 59–28	2,248	
December 1	No. 12 Wabash*	No. 2	Perkins Stadium; Whitewater, WI (NCAA Division III Quarterfinal)	W 47–7	2,335	
December 8	No. 4 Mary Hardin–Baylor*	No. 2	Perkins Stadium; Whitewater, WI (NCAA Division III Semifinal)	W 16–7	2,237	
December 15	vs. No. 1 Mount Union*	No. 2	Salem Football Stadium; Salem, VA (Stagg Bowl)	W 31–21	5,099	
*Non-conference game; ^{†}Homecoming; Rankings from NCAA Division III D3football.com poll released prior to the game
