= Dave Flynn (American football) =

American football coach (born c. 1971)

Biographical details
- Born: c. 1971 (age 54–55)
- Education: Union College (1993); Endicott College (2011)

Playing career
- 1989–1992: Union (NY)
- Position: Fullback

Coaching career (HC unless noted)
- 1993–1994: WPI (assistant)
- 1995–1997: Harvard (assistant)
- 1998–2001: Fitchburg State
- 2002–2005: Dedham HS (MA) (assistant)
- 2006–2010: Braintree HS (MA)
- 2011–2020: Dedham HS (MA)

Head coaching record
- Overall: 16–22 (college); 58–104 (high school)

David Flynn (born c. 1971) is an American college football coach. He was the head football coach for Dedham High School from 2011 to 2020. He previously coached for WPI and Harvard. He was the head football coach for Fitchburg State College—now known as Fitchburg State University—from 1998 to 2001 and Braintree High School from 2006 to 2010. He played college football for Union (NY) as a fullback.

In 2011, Flyyn was hired as the head coach at Dedham High School. His contract was not renewed in January 2021 because he expressed "significant philosophical differences" with the school district after he sent an e-mail to the school committee voicing opposition to critical race theory being included in his daughter's seventh grade curriculum. Following his firing, lawyers for the conservative activist group Judicial Watch filed a lawsuit on Flynn's behalf. The lawsuit was dismissed in May 2021, but Judicial Watch appealed. The two sides reached a settlement in which Flynn received $9,944 and a letter of apology from the superintendent.

== Head coaching record ==
=== College ===
Year	Team	Overall	Conference	Standing	Bowl/playoffs
Fitchburg State Falcons (New England Football Conference) (1998–2001)
1998	Fitchburg State	3–7	2–4	T–5th (Red)	
1999	Fitchburg State	6–4	4–2	3rd (Red)	
2000	Fitchburg State	5–4	4–2	3rd (Bogan)	
2001	Fitchburg State	2–7	1–5	7th (Bogan)	
Fitchburg State:		16–22	11–13		
Total:		16–22			

=== High school ===
Year	Team	Overall	Conference	Standing	Bowl/playoffs
Braintree Wamps () (2006–2010)
2006	Braintree	5–6	5–6	5th	
2007	Braintree	5–6	5–6	3rd	
2008	Braintree	5–6	5–6	3rd	
2009	Braintree	3–8	3–8	5th	
2010	Braintree	3–8	3–8	5th	
Braintree:		21–34	21–34		
Dedham Marauders () (2011–2020)
2011	Dedham	2–9			
2012	Dedham	2–9			
2013	Dedham	4–8	1–4	5th	
2014	Dedham	2–9	0–6	6th	
2015	Dedham	1–12	0–7	6th	
2016	Dedham	2–9	0–5	6th	
2017	Dedham	7–2	4–1	2nd	
2018	Dedham	9–4	4–1	1st	
2019	Dedham	6–5	3–2	3rd	
2020	Dedham	1–3	1–3	4th	
Dedham:		37–70	13–29		
Total:		58–104			
National championship Conference title Conference division title or championship game berth
