= Euclid, Pennsylvania =

Unincorporated community in Pennsylvania, U.S.

Coordinates: 40°59′36″N 79°55′44″W

Euclid is an unincorporated community in Butler County, in the U.S. state of Pennsylvania.

== History ==
Euclid was founded c. 1880, and named after fashionable Euclid Avenue, in Cleveland, Ohio.
