= Wisconsin Lutheran College =

Private college near Milwaukee, Wisconsin, US

Coordinates: 43°02′13.0″N 88°01′21.9″W

- Type: Private
- Established: 1973; 53 years ago
- Religious affiliation: Wisconsin Evangelical Lutheran Synod
- Endowment: $51.2 million (2025)
- President: Daniel W. Johnson
- Faculty: 132 (fall 2023)
- Students: 1,094 (fall 2023)
- Undergraduates: 1,021 (fall 2023)
- Postgraduates: 73 (fall 2023)
- Location: Milwaukee, Wisconsin, United States
- Campus: Suburban, 40 acres (16 ha)
- Athletics: 18 NCAA Division III teams
- Colors: Green and White
- Mascot: Warriors
- Website: wlc.edu
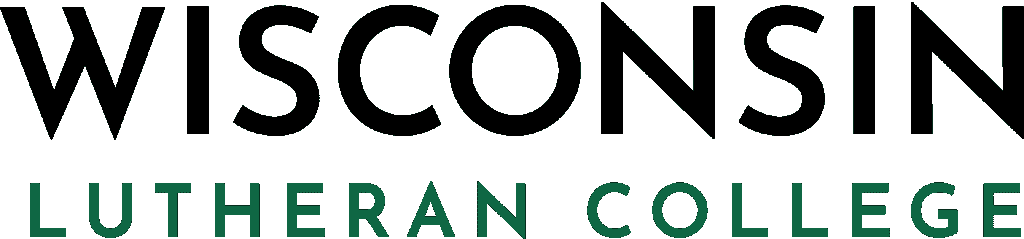

Wisconsin Lutheran College (WLC) is a private liberal arts college in Milwaukee, Wisconsin, United States. It has an enrollment of about 1,100 students. The college is affiliated with the Wisconsin Evangelical Lutheran Synod and is accredited by the Higher Learning Commission.

== History ==
Wisconsin Lutheran College opened in the fall of 1973 with a part-time faculty and two dozen students. The school had its first full-time president two years later. In 1977, the school purchased five buildings on an 8.5-acre (3.4 ha) campus, and had a set of plans that allowed for growth and development. In 1982, the college purchased the academic library from Milton College. Volunteers moved and installed this 60,000-volume library. In 1983, the college purchased and installed the science laboratory furnishings of the University of Wisconsin Center at Medford. These major additions helped the college pursue its dream of becoming a four-year college.

In 1984, the Board of Regents approved the four-year program to start in the fall of 1985. The evaluation team from the North Central Association of Colleges and Schools agreed that the necessary planning and resources existed to enable Wisconsin Lutheran College to move toward accreditation as a baccalaureate degree-granting institution. In May 1987, the first 12 students graduated with baccalaureate degrees. In June 1987, the Executive Commissioners of the North Central Association granted Wisconsin Lutheran College initial accreditation as a baccalaureate degree-granting institution.

Gary Greenfield, who served as the college's first full-time president for 28 years, retired in June 2003. Timothy Kriewall was inaugurated as the second president on Sept. 7, 2003, and retired in June 2008. Daniel Johnson accepted the call to be the third full-time president of Wisconsin Lutheran College in July 2008 and was inaugurated on April 24, 2009.

The college was the site of the theft of the Lipinski Stradivarius violin in 2014. On January 27, 2014, violin owner Frank Almond was assaulted in the parking lot of the college after giving a performance there. The violin was stolen and a $100,000 reward was offered for its return. It was eventually recovered a week later and the thieves were arrested.

== Campus ==
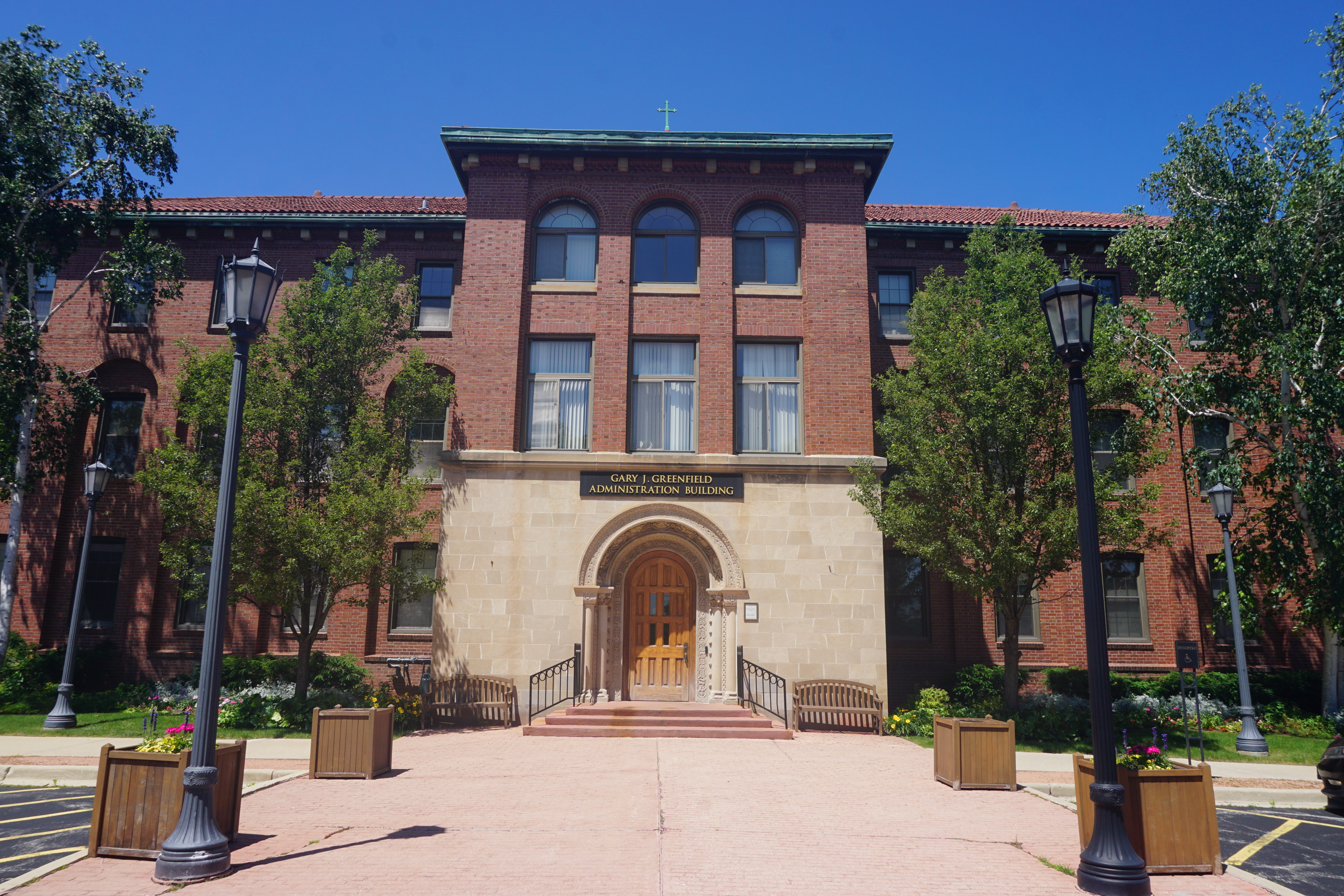
The Gary J. Greenfield Administration Building

The Wisconsin Lutheran College campus straddles the border of Milwaukee and Wauwatosa, Wisconsin. It consists of the Gary J. Greenfield Administration Building, the Campus Center, the Center for Arts and Performance, the Marvin M. Schwan Library building, the Science Hall (renamed Generac Hall in May 2011), a recreational center, two dormitories, and several apartment buildings near campus owned by the school.

The Gary J. Greenfield Administration Building was built in the 1880s under the supervision of Milwaukee architect Alexander Eschweiler. It served as the home of a Catholic boys', then girls' school for many years until it was bought by Wisconsin Lutheran College in the early 1970s.

=== Campus construction ===
In September 1987, construction began on the first building erected on campus. One year later, on Sept. 10, 1988, the Marvin M. Schwan Library was completed and dedicated. In July 1991, after two years of negotiation with the city of Wauwatosa, construction began on the college's second building, the Recreation Complex, which was dedicated on September 12, 1992. A third building, the Center for Arts and Performance, was completed in 1996, and the Campus Center was finished and dedicated in 1998. Two residence halls were constructed and dedicated on September 9, 2000. After two years of additional negotiation with the city of Wauwatosa and neighbors, construction began on Science Hall, which was dedicated on September 11, 2004. In February 2004, the college purchased 26 acres (10.5 ha) of land in the northwest quadrant of the Milwaukee County Grounds as a site for its new outdoor athletic complex. Warrior Fields was dedicated on September 10, 2005.

== Rankings ==
WLC was ranked 12th in the U.S. on Washington Monthly's 2013 Best Bang for the Buck Rankings for liberal arts colleges. In 2013, WLC ranked 12th in the nation on CBS MoneyWatch's list of U.S. colleges with the best professors.

== Athletics ==
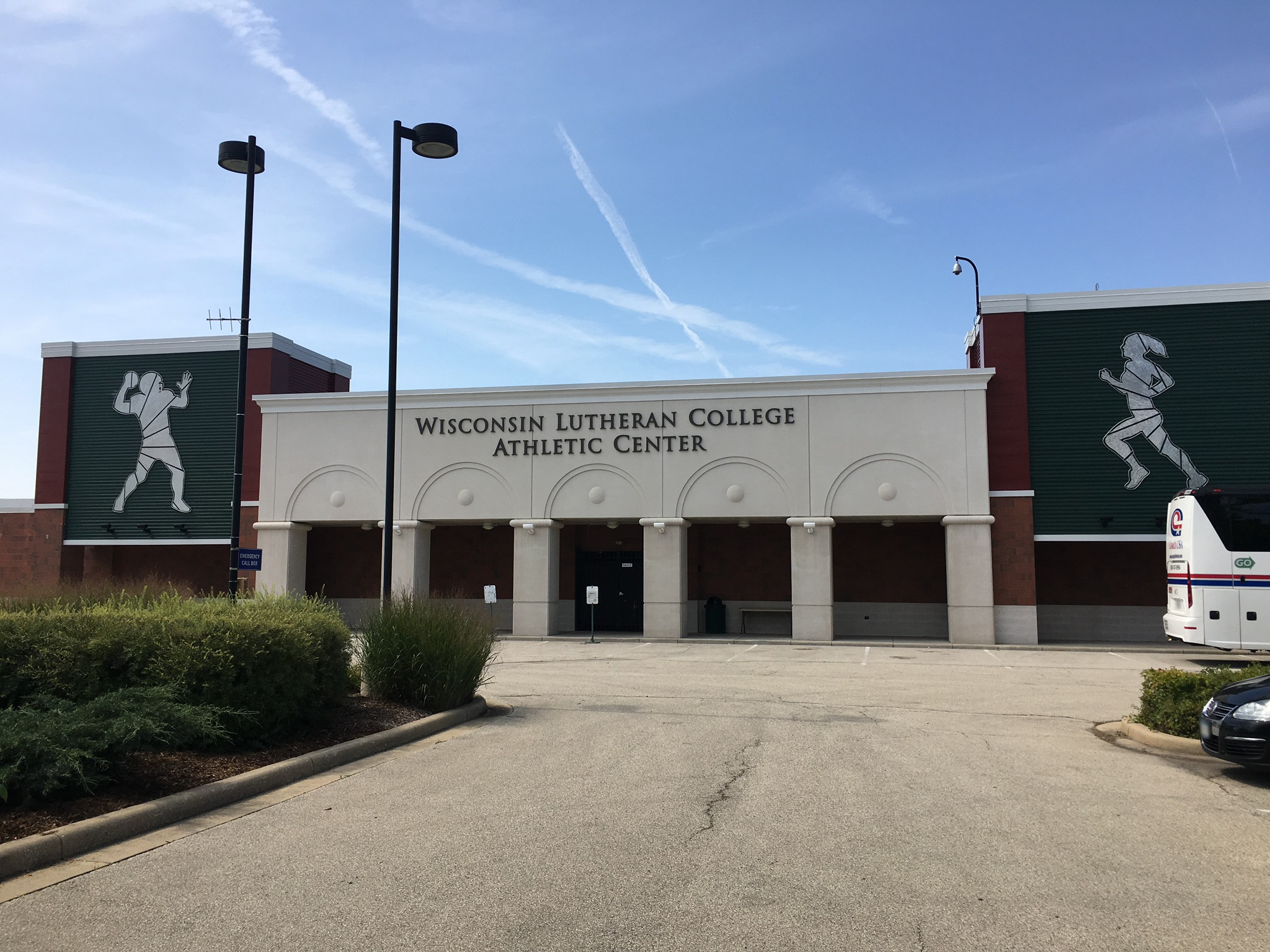
Wisconsin Lutheran College Athletic Center

Wisconsin Lutheran teams participate as a member of the National Collegiate Athletic Association's Division III. The Warriors are a member of the Northern Athletics Conference (NACC). Wisconsin Lutheran was also a member of the Lake Michigan Conference until the spring of 2006. Men's sports include baseball, basketball, cross country, football, golf, soccer, tennis and track & field; while women's sports include basketball, cross country, golf, soccer, softball, tennis, track & field and volleyball.

=== Extra-curricular activities ===
- Intramural and club sports
- Concert band and six ensembles
- Two choirs
- 30 + clubs and organizations
- Ministry, outreach, and volunteer opportunities

== Notable people ==
=== Alumni ===
- Suzanne Grzanna, musician
- Ben Murphy, football coach
- Zach Shaw, football coach

=== Faculty ===
- Dennis Miller, football coach
