= Endicott Gulls football =

- First season: 2002; 24 years ago
- Head coach: Paul McGonagle; 7th season, 62–16 (.795)
- Location: Beverly, Massachusetts
- Stadium: The Multi-Purpose Stadium (capacity: 2,200)
- Conference: CNE
- Colors: Blue and green
- All-time record: 150–81–0 (.649)
- Bowl record: 3–1 (.750)

Conference championships
- 6

Division championships
- 3
- Website: ECGulls.com

The Endicott Gulls football team is a college football that competes as part of National Collegiate Athletic Association (NCAA) Division III, representing Endicott College in the Conference of New England (CNE).

== Championships ==
=== Conference championships ===
Endicott claims 8 conference titles, the most recent of which came in 2026.

Year	Conference	Overall Record	Conference Record	Coach
2010	New England Football Conference	9–3	6–1	J. B. Wells
2013	New England Football Conference	8–3	7–0	J. B. Wells
2021†	Commonwealth Coast Football	8–3	5–1	Paul McGonagle
2022	Commonwealth Coast Conference	10–1	6–0	Paul McGonagle
2023	Commonwealth Coast Conference	9–2	5–0	Paul McGonagle
2024	Conference of New England	10–2	5–0	Paul McGonagle
2025	Conference of New England	9–2	7–0	Paul McGonagle
2026	Conference of New England			Paul McGonagle

† Co-champions

=== Division championships ===
Endicott claims 3 division titles, the most recent of which came in 2012.

Year	Division	Coach	Overall Record	Conference Record	Opponent	CG result
2004†	NEFC Boyd	J. B. Wells	6–4	5–1	N/A lost tiebreaker to Curry	
2010†	NEFC Boyd	J. B. Wells	9–3	6–1	Maine Maritime	W 38–35
2012†	NEFC Boyd	J. B. Wells	9–2	6–1	N/A lost tiebreaker to Salve Regina	

† Co-champions

== Postseason games ==
=== NCAA Division III playoffs ===
The Gulls have made seven appearances in the NCAA Division III playoffs, with a combined record of 1–7.

Year	Round	Opponent	Result
2010	First Round	Cortland	L, 35–49
2013	First Round	Rowan	L, 0–24
2021	First Round	RPI	L, 14–20
2022	First Round	Springfield	L, 14–17
2023	First Round	Cortland	L, 17–23
2024	First Round; Second Round	Alfred State; Cortland	W, 44–0; L, 9–17
2025	First Round	Salisbury	L, 28–35

=== Bowl games ===
The Gulls have participated in four bowl games, and has a record of 3–1.

Season	Coach	Bowl	Opponent	Result
2011	J. B. Wells	ECAC Bowl	Mount Ida	W 31–22
2012	J. B. Wells	ECAC Bowl	Norwich	W 34–14
2018	Paul McGonagle	New England Bowl	Merchant Marine	L 22–38
2019	Paul McGonagle	New England Bowl	Dean	W 52–10

== Year-by-year results ==
National champions	Conference champions	Bowl game berth	Playoff berth

Season	Year	Head Coach	Association	Division	Conference	Record							Postseason	Final ranking
Season	Year	Head Coach	Association	Division	Conference	Overall			Conference				Postseason	Final ranking
Season	Year	Head Coach	Association	Division	Conference	Win	Loss	Tie	Finish	Win	Loss	Tie	Postseason	Final ranking
Endicott Gulls
2002	2002	Junior varsity team												
2003	2003	J. B. Wells	NCAA	Division III	NEFC	4	5	0	4th (Boyd)	3	3	0	—	—
2004	2004	J. B. Wells	NCAA	Division III	NEFC	6	4	0	T–1st (Boyd)	5	1	0	—	—
2005	2005	J. B. Wells	NCAA	Division III	NEFC	7	3	0	2nd (Boyd)	5	1	0	—	—
2006	2006	J. B. Wells	NCAA	Division III	NEFC	6	4	0	2nd (Boyd)	5	2	0	—	—
2007	2007	J. B. Wells	NCAA	Division III	NEFC	3	6	0	5th (Boyd)	3	4	0	—	—
2008	2008	J. B. Wells	NCAA	Division III	NEFC	3	7	0	7th (Boyd)	2	5	0	—	—
2009	2009	J. B. Wells	NCAA	Division III	NEFC	5	5	0	T–4th (Boyd)	3	5	0	—	—
2010	2010	J. B. Wells	NCAA	Division III	NEFC	9	3	0	T–1st (Boyd)	6	1	0	L NCAA First Round	—
2011	2011	J. B. Wells	NCAA	Division III	NEFC	10	1	0	2nd (Boyd)	6	1	0	W ECAC Bowl	—
2012	2012	J. B. Wells	NCAA	Division III	NEFC	10	1	0	T–1st (Boyd)	6	1	0	W ECAC Bowl	—
2013	2013	J. B. Wells	NCAA	Division III	NEFC	8	3	0	1st	7	0	0	L NCAA First Round	—
2014	2014	J. B. Wells	NCAA	Division III	NEFC	5	5	0	5th	4	3	0	—	—
2015	2015	Kevin DeWall	NCAA	Division III	NEFC	5	5	0	T–2nd	5	2	0	—	—
2016	2016	Kevin DeWall	NCAA	Division III	NEFC	5	5	0	3rd	5	2	0	—	—
2017	2017	Kevin DeWall	NCAA	Division III	NEFC	3	7	0	4th	2	3	0	—	—
2018	2018	Paul McGonagle	NCAA	Division III	CCF	7	4	0	T–2nd	5	1	0	L New England Bowl	—
2019	2019	Paul McGonagle	NCAA	Division III	CCF	9	2	0	1st	6	1	0	W New England Bowl	—
Season canceled due to COVID-19
2021	2021	Paul McGonagle	NCAA	Division III	CCF	8	3	0	1st	5	1	0	L NCAA First Round	—
2022	2022	Paul McGonagle	NCAA	Division III	CCC	10	1	0	1st	6	0	0	L NCAA First Round	25
2023	2023	Paul McGonagle	NCAA	Division III	CCC	9	2	0	1st	5	0	0	L NCAA First Round	15
2024	2024	Paul McGonagle	NCAA	Division III	CCC	10	2	0	1st	5	0	0	L NCAA Second Round	10
2025	2025	Paul McGonagle	NCAA	Division III	CNE	9	2	0	1st	7	0	0	L NCAA Second Round	—
