= Ben Murphy (rugby union, born 1996) =

Welsh rugby union player

- Born: Ben Murphy; 20 January 1996 (age 30) Wales
- Height: 196 cm (6 ft 5 in)
- Weight: 120 kg (18 st 13 lb)

Rugby union career
- Current team: Doncaster Knights
Senior career
Years	Team	Apps	(Points)
2017-2021	Cardiff Blues	19	(0)
- Correct as of 11 December 2019

Ben Murphy (born 20 January 1996) is a Welsh rugby union player, who plays for Doncaster Knights in the second row.

Murphy made his debut for the first XV in 2017 having previously played for the academy side.
