= Euclid Avenue School =

- U.S. National Register of Historic Places
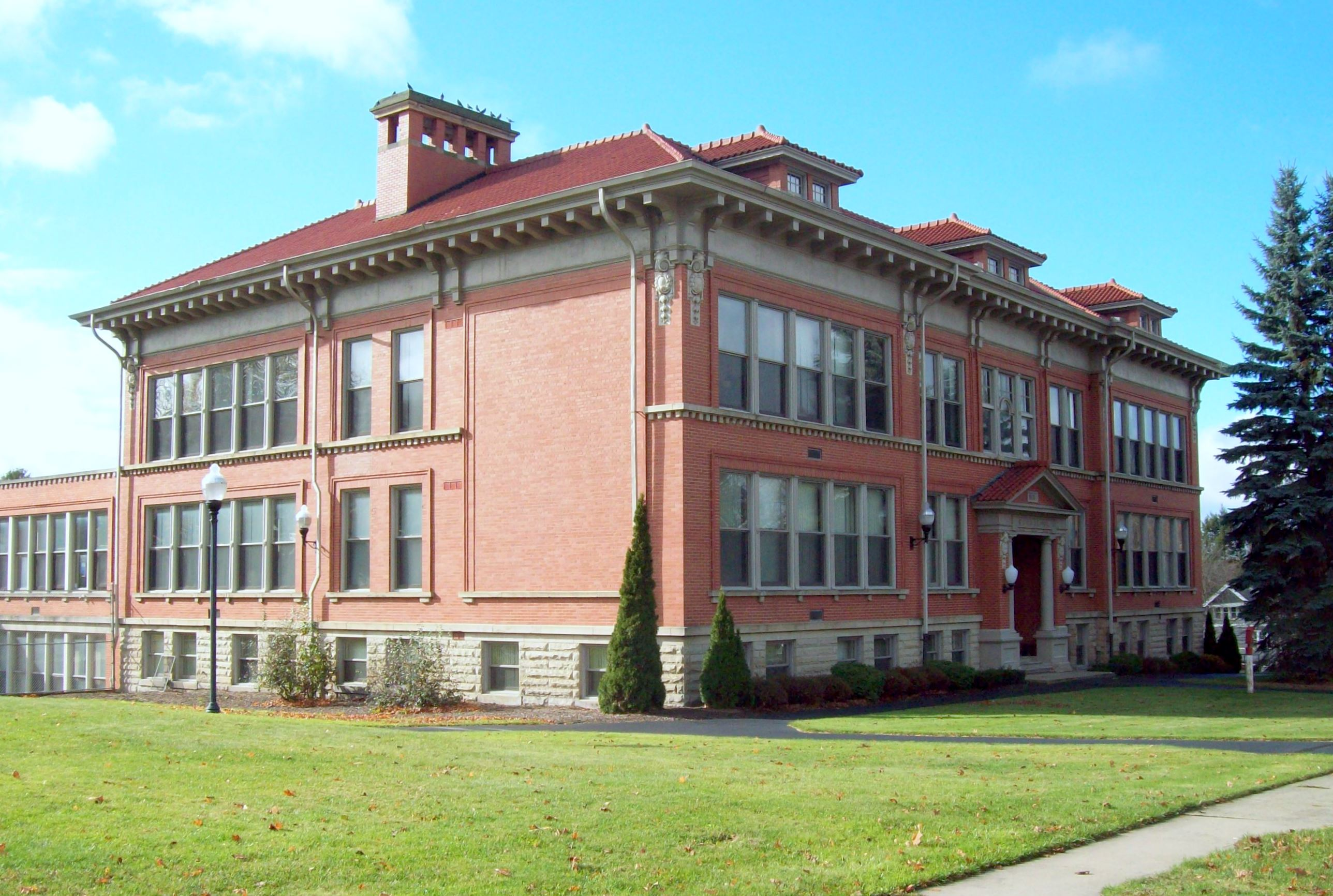
- Euclid Avenue School, November 2010

- Location within New York Location within the United States
- Location: 28 Euclid Ave., Jamestown, New York
- Coordinates: 42°06′31″N 79°14′17″W
- Built: 1911
- Architect: Pedersen, C.C.
- Architectural style: Classical Revival
- NRHP reference No.: 85000628
- Added to NRHP: March 21, 1985

Euclid Avenue School is a historic school building located at Jamestown in Chautauqua County, New York. It is a two-story, rectangular brick structure built in 1911 and enlarged in 1920 and 1956. The structure combines Neoclassical features and proportions with elements of the Spanish Mission and American Craftsman styles in an eclectic composition that is characteristic of early 20th-century architectural fashion.

It was listed on the National Register of Historic Places in 1985.
