= 2007 NCAA Division III football season =

American college football season

- Regular season: August – November 2007
- Playoffs: November – December 2007
- National championship: Salem Football Stadium; Salem, VA
- Champion: Wisconsin–Whitewater (1)
- Gagliardi Trophy: Justin Beaver (RB), Wisconsin–Whitewater

The 2007 NCAA Division III football season, part of the college football season organized by the NCAA at the Division III level in the United States, began in August 2007, and concluded with the NCAA Division III Football Championship, also known as the Stagg Bowl, in December 2007 at Salem Football Stadium in Salem, Virginia. The Wisconsin–Whitewater Warhawks won their first Division III championship by defeating the Mount Union Purple Raiders, 31−21. This was the third of seven straight championship games between Mount Union (3 wins) and Wisconsin–Whitewater (4 wins).

The Gagliardi Trophy, given to the most outstanding player in Division III football, was awarded to Justin Beaver, running back from Wisconsin–Whitewater.

== Conference standings ==
2007 American Southwest Conference football standings
	Conf.			Overall
Team	W		L	W		L
No. 3 Mary Hardin–Baylor $^	8	–	0	12	–	2
Mississippi College	6	–	2	8	–	2
Hardin–Simmons	6	–	2	6	–	4
East Texas Baptist	5	–	3	5	–	5
Louisiana College	4	–	4	5	–	5
Sul Ross	3	–	5	5	–	5
Texas Lutheran	2	–	6	2	–	8
McMurry	1	–	7	2	–	8
Howard Payne	1	–	7	1	–	9
$ – Conference champion; ^ – NCAA Division III playoff participant; Rankings from D3football.com

2007 Atlantic Central Football Conference standings
	Conf.			Overall
Team	W		L	W		L
No. 5 Wesley $^	4	–	0	11	–	2
No. 14 Salisbury ^	3	–	1	9	–	2
Brockport	2	–	2	5	–	5
Apprentice §	1	–	3	4	–	6
Frostburg State	0	–	4	2	–	7
$ – Conference champion; ^ – NCAA Division III playoff participant; § – Not an NCAA member; Rankings from D3football.com

2007 Centennial Conference football standings
	Conf.			Overall
Team	W		L	W		L
No. 8 Muhlenberg $^	8	–	0	11	–	1
Dickinson	6	–	2	9	–	2
Ursinus	5	–	3	7	–	3
Gettysburg	5	–	3	6	–	5
Moravian	4	–	4	6	–	4
Franklin & Marshall	4	–	4	4	–	6
Johns Hopkins	3	–	5	4	–	6
McDaniel	1	–	7	1	–	9
Juniata	0	–	8	1	–	9
$ – Conference champion; ^ – NCAA Division III playoff participant; Rankings from D3football.com

2007 College Conference of Illinois and Wisconsin football standings
	Conf.			Overall
Team	W		L	W		L
No. 11 North Central (IL) +^	6	–	1	9	–	3
Illinois Wesleyan +	6	–	1	7	–	3
Wheaton (IL)	5	–	2	8	–	2
Carthage	4	–	3	7	–	3
Elmhurst	3	–	4	6	–	4
Augustana (IL)	3	–	4	5	–	5
Millikin	1	–	6	2	–	8
North Park	0	–	7	1	–	9
+ – Conference co-champions; ^ – NCAA Division III playoff participant; Rankings from D3football.com

2007 Empire 8 Athletic Conference football standings
	Conf.			Overall
Team	W		L	W		L
No. 7 St. John Fisher +^	5	–	1	11	–	2
Hartwick +^	5	–	1	8	–	3
Alfred	4	–	2	8	–	3
No. 21 Ithaca ^	4	–	2	8	–	3
Springfield	2	–	4	4	–	6
Utica	1	–	5	3	–	7
Norwich	0	–	6	2	–	8
+ – Conference co-champions; ^ – NCAA Division III playoff participant; Rankings from D3football.com

2007 Heartland Collegiate Athletic Conference football standings
	Conf.			Overall
Team	W		L	W		L
No. 18 Franklin (IN) $^	7	–	0	9	–	2
Mount St. Joseph ^	6	–	1	9	–	2
Rose-Hulman	4	–	3	7	–	3
Defiance	4	–	3	5	–	5
Anderson (IN)	3	–	4	4	–	6
Hanover	2	–	5	2	–	8
Manchester	1	–	6	3	–	7
Bluffton	1	–	6	1	–	9
$ – Conference champion; ^ – NCAA Division III playoff participant; Rankings from D3football.com

2007 Illini–Badger Football Conference standings
	Conf.			Overall
Team	W		L	W		L
Concordia (WI) +^	6	–	1	7	–	4
Lakeland +	6	–	1	6	–	4
Aurora	4	–	3	5	–	5
Benedictine (IL)	4	–	3	5	–	5
Greenville	4	–	3	5	–	5
Concordia (IL)	2	–	5	3	–	7
Eureka	2	–	5	2	–	8
MacMurray	0	–	7	0	–	10
+ – Conference co-champions; ^ – NCAA Division III playoff participant

2007 Iowa Intercollegiate Athletic Conference football standings
	Conf.			Overall
Team	W		L	W		L
No. 6 Central (IA) $^	8	–	0	12	–	1
No. 20 Wartburg	7	–	1	8	–	2
Coe	5	–	3	7	–	3
Dubuque	5	–	3	7	–	3
Luther	4	–	4	5	–	5
Buena Vista	3	–	5	5	–	5
Simpson (IA)	3	–	5	4	–	6
Loras	1	–	7	2	–	8
Cornell (IA)	0	–	8	2	–	8
$ – Conference champion; ^ – NCAA Division III playoff participant; Rankings from D3football.com

2007 Liberty League football standings
	Conf.			Overall
Team	W		L	W		L
RPI +^	6	–	1	8	–	2
Hobart +^	6	–	1	8	–	3
Rochester (NY)	5	–	2	6	–	5
Union (NY)	5	–	2	5	–	5
St. Lawrence	3	–	4	4	–	5
WPI	1	–	6	4	–	6
Susquehanna	1	–	6	2	–	8
Merchant Marine	1	–	6	1	–	9
+ – Conference co-champions; ^ – NCAA Division III playoff participant

2007 Michigan Intercollegiate Athletic Association football standings
	Conf.			Overall
Team	W		L	W		L
Hope +	6	–	1	6	–	4
Olivet +^	6	–	1	6	–	5
Alma	5	–	2	5	–	5
Adrian	4	–	3	7	–	3
Tri-State	4	–	3	6	–	4
Albion	2	–	5	2	–	8
Wisconsin Lutheran	1	–	6	1	–	9
Kalamazoo	0	–	7	1	–	8
+ – Conference co-champions; ^ – NCAA Division III playoff participant

2007 Middle Atlantic Conference football standings
	Conf.			Overall
Team	W		L	W		L
Widener $^	7	–	0	8	–	3
Albright	5	–	2	7	–	4
Delaware Valley	5	–	2	5	–	5
Wilkes	4	–	3	4	–	6
Lebanon Valley	3	–	4	4	–	6
Lycoming	3	–	4	3	–	7
King's	1	–	6	1	–	9
FDU Florham	0	–	7	2	–	8
$ – Conference champion; ^ – NCAA Division III playoff participant; Rankings from D3football.com

2007 Midwest Conference football standings
	Conf.			Overall
Team	W		L	W		L
St. Norbert $^	9	–	0	10	–	1
Monmouth (IL)	7	–	2	7	–	3
Ripon	7	–	2	7	–	3
Carroll (WI)	5	–	4	5	–	5
Lake Forest	5	–	4	5	–	5
Illinois College	4	–	5	4	–	6
Lawrence	4	–	5	4	–	6
Knox	2	–	7	3	–	7
Beloit	1	–	8	1	–	9
Grinnell	1	–	8	1	–	9
$ – Conference champion; ^ – NCAA Division III playoff participant

2007 Minnesota Intercollegiate Athletic Conference football standings
	Conf.			Overall
Team	W		L	W		L
No. 4 Bethel (MN) $^	8	–	0	12	–	2
No. 9 Saint John's (MN) ^	7	–	1	10	–	2
St. Olaf	6	–	2	8	–	2
Concordia–Moorhead	5	–	3	7	–	3
Augsburg	3	–	5	5	–	5
Gustavus Adolphus	3	–	5	5	–	5
St. Thomas (MN)	2	–	6	2	–	8
Carleton	1	–	7	3	–	7
Hamline	1	–	7	3	–	7
$ – Conference champion; ^ – NCAA Division III playoff participant; Rankings from D3football.com

2007 New England Football Conference standings
	Conf.			Overall
Team	W		L	W		L
Bogan Division
Coast Guard xy	7	–	0	8	–	2
Bridgewater State	5	–	2	6	–	4
Maine Maritime	4	–	3	5	–	4
Westfield State	4	–	3	5	–	4
Worcester State	3	–	4	4	–	6
Fitchburg State	3	–	4	3	–	6
Massachusetts Maritime	1	–	6	3	–	7
Framingham State	1	–	6	2	–	7
Boyd Division
No. 23 Curry xy$^	7	–	0	12	–	1
Plymouth State	6	–	1	9	–	1
Nichols	4	–	3	5	–	4
UMass Dartmouth	4	–	3	5	–	5
Endicott	3	–	4	3	–	6
MIT	2	–	5	2	–	7
Western New England	1	–	6	3	–	7
Salve Regina	1	–	6	2	–	7
Championship: Curry 10, Coast Guard 7
$ – Conference champion; x – Division champion/co-champions; y – Championship game participant; ^ – NCAA Division III playoff participant; Rankings from D3football.com

2007 New England Small College Athletic Conference football standings
	Conf.			Overall
Team	W		L	W		L
Middlebury $	7	–	1	7	–	1
Trinity (CT)	6	–	2	6	–	2
Williams	6	–	2	6	–	2
Tufts	5	–	3	5	–	3
Amherst	4	–	4	4	–	4
Wesleyan	4	–	4	4	–	4
Bowdoin	3	–	5	3	–	5
Colby	2	–	6	2	–	6
Hamilton	2	–	6	2	–	6
Bates	1	–	7	1	–	7
$ – Conference champion

2007 New Jersey Athletic Conference football standings
	Conf.			Overall
Team	W		L	W		L
No. 15 TCNJ +^	6	–	1	9	–	3
Cortland +	6	–	1	8	–	3
Montclair State	5	–	2	9	–	2
Kean	3	–	4	5	–	5
William Paterson	3	–	4	5	–	5
Rowan	2	–	5	4	–	6
Western Connecticut	2	–	5	4	–	6
Buffalo State	1	–	6	2	–	8
+ – Conference co-champions; ^ – NCAA Division III playoff participant; Rankings from D3football.com

2007 North Coast Athletic Conference football standings
	Conf.			Overall
Team	W		L	W		L
No. 10 Wabash $^	7	–	0	11	–	2
Wittenberg	6	–	1	8	–	2
Oberlin	5	–	2	5	–	5
Ohio Wesleyan	4	–	3	4	–	6
Wooster	4	–	3	4	–	6
Allegheny	3	–	4	5	–	5
Denison	3	–	4	4	–	6
Earlham	2	–	5	3	–	7
Kenyon	1	–	6	2	–	8
Hiram	0	–	7	0	–	10
$ – Conference champion; ^ – NCAA Division III playoff participant; Rankings from D3football.com

2007 Northwest Conference football standings
	Conf.			Overall
Team	W		L	W		L
No. 24 Whitworth $	6	–	0	8	–	2
Pacific Lutheran	4	–	2	7	–	2
Linfield	4	–	2	6	–	3
Willamette	3	–	3	4	–	6
Puget Sound	2	–	4	4	–	5
Menlo	2	–	4	2	–	8
Lewis & Clark	0	–	6	0	–	9
$ – Conference champion; Rankings from D3football.com

2007 Ohio Athletic Conference football standings
	Conf.			Overall
Team	W		L	W		L
No. 2 Mount Union $^	9	–	0	14	–	1
No. 13 Capital ^	7	–	2	8	–	3
Ohio Northern	6	–	3	7	–	3
Baldwin–Wallace	5	–	4	6	–	4
John Carroll	5	–	4	6	–	4
Otterbein	5	–	4	5	–	5
Heidelberg	3	–	6	4	–	6
Marietta	3	–	6	3	–	7
Wilmington (OH)	2	–	7	2	–	8
Muskingum	0	–	9	0	–	10
$ – Conference champion; ^ – NCAA Division III playoff participant; Rankings from D3football.com

2007 Old Dominion Athletic Conference football standings
	Conf.			Overall
Team	W		L	W		L
Randolph–Macon +	5	–	1	8	–	2
Hampden–Sydney +^	5	–	1	8	–	3
Washington and Lee	4	–	2	6	–	3
Bridgewater	3	–	3	7	–	3
Guilford	2	–	4	6	–	4
Catholic University	1	–	5	5	–	5
Emory & Henry	1	–	5	4	–	6
$ – Conference champion; + – Conference co-champions; ^ – NCAA Division III playoff participant

2007 Presidents' Athletic Conference football standings
	Conf.			Overall
Team	W		L	W		L
No. 17 Washington & Jefferson $^	6	–	0	10	–	1
Waynesburg	5	–	1	8	–	3
Grove City	3	–	3	4	–	6
Westminster (PA)	2	–	4	5	–	5
Bethany (WV)	2	–	4	4	–	6
Thomas More	2	–	4	4	–	6
Thiel	1	–	5	3	–	7
Geneva #		–		8	–	3
St. Vincent #		–		0	–	10
$ – Conference champion; ^ – NCAA Division III playoff participant; # – Provisional NCAA Divisional III member; games not counted in standings; Rankings from D3football.com

2007 Southern California Intercollegiate Athletic Conference football standings
	Conf.			Overall
Team	W		L	W		L
No. 25 Redlands +^	5	–	1	8	–	2
Cal Lutheran +	5	–	1	5	–	4
Occidental	4	–	2	7	–	2
Whittier	3	–	3	4	–	5
Claremont–Mudd–Scripps	2	–	4	3	–	6
Pomona–Pitzer	1	–	5	2	–	7
La Verne	1	–	5	1	–	8
+ – Conference co-champions; ^ – NCAA Division III playoff participant; Rankings from D3football.com

2007 Southern Collegiate Athletic Conference football standings
	Conf.			Overall
Team	W		L	W		L
No. 16 Trinity (TX) +^	6	–	1	9	–	2
Millsaps +	6	–	1	8	–	2
DePauw	5	–	2	8	–	2
Centre	4	–	3	6	–	4
Rhodes	4	–	3	6	–	4
Austin	2	–	5	4	–	6
Colorado College	1	–	6	4	–	6
Sewanee	0	–	7	1	–	8
Birmingham–Southern #		–		1	–	7
+ – Conference co-champions; ^ – NCAA Division III playoff participant; # – Provisional Division III member; games not counted in standings; Rankings from D3football.com

2007 University Athletic Association football standings
	Conf.			Overall
Team	W		L	W		L
No. 22 Case Western Reserve $^	3	–	0	11	–	1
Carnegie Mellon	2	–	1	7	–	4
Washington University	1	–	2	7	–	3
Chicago	0	–	3	4	–	5
$ – Conference champion; ^ – Division III playoff participant; Rankings from D3football.com

2007 Upper Midwest Athletic Conference football standings
	Conf.			Overall
Team	W		L	W		L
North
Northwestern (MN) xy$#	7	–	0	7	–	2
Martin Luther	5	–	2	6	–	3
Crown #	4	–	3	5	–	3
Minnesota–Morris #	4	–	3	4	–	4
Trinity Bible §	1	–	6	1	–	8
South
Rockford xy	5	–	2	6	–	3
Westminster (MO)	4	–	3	4	–	5
Blackburn	3	–	4	3	–	6
Maranatha Baptist	1	–	6	2	–	7
Principia	1	–	6	1	–	8
Championship: Northwestern (MN) 28, Rockford 27
$ – Conference champion; x – Division champion/co-champions; y – Championship game participant; # – Provisional NCAA Division III member § – Not an NCAA member

2007 USA South Athletic Conference football standings
	Conf.			Overall
Team	W		L	W		L
No. 19 North Carolina Wesleyan $^	7	–	0	9	–	3
Christopher Newport	6	–	1	7	–	3
Maryville (TN)	4	–	3	7	–	3
Ferrum	4	–	3	5	–	5
Methodist	4	–	3	4	–	6
Shenandoah	2	–	5	2	–	8
Greensboro	1	–	6	2	–	8
Averett	0	–	7	0	–	10
$ – Conference champion; ^ – NCAA Division III playoff participant; Rankings from D3football.com

2007 Wisconsin Intercollegiate Athletic Conference football standings
	Conf.			Overall
Team	W		L	W		L
No. 1 Wisconsin–Whitewater $^	7	–	0	14	–	1
No. 12 Wisconsin–Eau Claire ^	5	–	2	9	–	3
Wisconsin–Oshkosh	4	–	3	7	–	3
Wisconsin–Stevens Point	3	–	4	6	–	4
Wisconsin–La Crosse	3	–	4	5	–	4
Wisconsin–Stout	3	–	4	4	–	6
Wisconsin–River Falls	2	–	5	3	–	7
Wisconsin–Platteville	1	–	6	2	–	8
$ – Conference champion; ^ – NCAA Division III playoff participant; Rankings from D3football.com

2007 NCAA Division III independents football records
	Conf.			Overall
Team	W		L	W		L
Chapman		–		6	–	3
Husson		–		6	–	3
Huntingdon		–		5	–	5
Macalester		–		4	–	5
Morrisville State #		–		3	–	7
Mount Ida		–		3	–	7
Gallaudet		–		2	–	6
Becker		–		2	–	7
SUNY Maritime		–		2	–	8
LaGrange		–		0	–	10
# – Provisional Division III member

== Conference champions ==
Conference champions
- American Southwest Conference – Mary Hardin–Baylor
- Atlantic Central Football Conference – Wesley
- Centennial Conference – Muhlenberg
- College Conference of Illinois and Wisconsin – Illinois Wesleyan and North Central (IL)
- Empire 8 Conference – Hartwick and St. John Fisher
- Heartland Collegiate Athletic Conference – Franklin
- Illini-Badger Football Conference‡ – Concordia (WI) and Lakeland
- Iowa Intercollegiate Athletic Conference – Central (IA)
- Liberty League – Hobart and RPI
- Michigan Intercollegiate Athletic Association – Hope and Olivet
- Middle Atlantic Conference – Widener
- Midwest Conference – St. Norbert
- Minnesota Intercollegiate Athletic Conference – Bethel (MN)
- New England Football Conference – Coast Guard (Bogan Division), Curry (Boyd Division)
  - Championship Game: Curry 10, Coast Guard 7
- New England Small College Athletic Conference – Middlebury
- New Jersey Athletic Conference – SUNY Cortland and TCNJ
- North Coast Athletic Conference – Wabash
- Northwest Conference – Whitworth
- Ohio Athletic Conference – Mount Union
- Old Dominion Athletic Conference – Hampden–Sydney
- Presidents' Athletic Conference – Washington & Jefferson
- Southern California Intercollegiate Athletic Conference – Cal Lutheran and Redlands
- Southern Collegiate Athletic Conference – Millsaps and Trinity (TX)
- University Athletic Association – Case Western Reserve
- Upper Midwest Athletic Conference – Northwestern–St. Paul
- USA South Athletic Conference – North Carolina Wesleyan
- Wisconsin Intercollegiate Athletic Conference – Wisconsin–Whitewater

== Postseason ==
The 2007 NCAA Division III Football Championship playoffs were the 35th annual single-elimination tournament to determine the national champion of men's NCAA Division III college football. The championship Stagg Bowl game was held at Salem Football Stadium in Salem, Virginia for the 15th time.

=== Qualification ===
Twenty-two conferences met the requirements for an automatic ("Pool A") bid to the playoffs. Besides the NESCAC, which does not participate in the playoffs, four conferences had no Pool A bid. The NWC was in the second year of the two-year waiting period, while the ACFC, UAA, and UMAC failed to meet the seven-member requirement. The PAC received a Pool A bid for the first time, having attained seven members and passed through the waiting period.

Schools not in Pool A conferences were eligible for Pool B. The number of Pool B bids was determined by calculating the ratio of Pool A conferences to schools in those conferences and applying that ratio to the number of Pool B schools. The 22 Pool A conferences contained 190 schools, an average of 8.6 teams per conference. Thirty schools were in Pool B, enough for three bids.

The remaining seven playoff spots were at-large ("Pool C") teams.

=== Playoff bracket ===
First Round; Campus Sites
Mount Union	42
Ithaca	18
TCNJ	17
RPI	14
Curry	42
Hartwick	21
St. John Fisher	24
Hobart	7
Central (IA)	38
Olivet	17
Saint John's (MN)	41
Redlands	13
Wisconsin–Eau Claire	24
St. Norbert	20
Bethel (MN)	28
Concordia Wisconsin	0
North Carolina Wesleyan	35*
Washington & Jefferson	34
Mary Hardin–Baylor	52
Trinity (TX)	23
Muhlenberg	31
Salisbury	21
Wesley	45
Hampden–Sydney	17
Wisconsin–Whitewater	34
Capital	14
North Central (IL)	44
Franklin	42
Wabash	31
Mount St. Joseph	21
Case Western	21
Widener	20

Second Round; Campus Sites
Mount Union	59
TCNJ	7
Curry	7
St. John Fisher	38
Central (IA)	37
Saint John's (MN)	7
Wisconsin–Eau Claire	12
Bethel (MN)	21
North Carolina Wesleyan	0
Mary Hardin–Baylor	64
Muhlenberg	21
Wesley	38
Wisconsin–Whitewater	59
North Central (IL)	28
Wabash	38
Case Western	23

Quarterfinals; Campus Sites
Mount Union	52
St. John Fisher	10
Central (IA)	13
Bethel (MN)	27
Mary Hardin–Baylor	27
Wesley	10
Wisconsin–Whitewater	47
Wabash	7

Semifinals; Campus Sites
Mount Union	62
Bethel (MN)	14
Mary Hardin–Baylor	7
Wisconsin–Whitewater	16

National Championship Game; Salem Football Stadium; Salem, Virginia
Mount Union	21
Wisconsin–Whitewater	31

* Overtime

=== Bowl games ===
Date	Bowl	Location	Home team	Away team	Score
November 17	ECAC North Atlantic Bowl	Currier Field; Plymouth, New Hampshire	Plymouth State	Bridgewater State	24–21
November 17	Victory Bowl	Reeves Field; Beaver Falls, Pennsylvania	Malone (NAIA)	Geneva	45–17

== See also ==
- 2007 NCAA Division I FBS football season
- 2007 NCAA Division I FCS football season
- 2007 NCAA Division II football season
