= Zach Shaw =

American football coach (born 1990)

Current position
- Title: Offensive coordinator & quarterbacks coach
- Team: Saint Vincent
- Conference: PAC

Biographical details
- Born: December 10, 1990 (age 35)
- Education: Wisconsin Lutheran College (2013); Nichols College (2020)

Playing career
- 2009–2012: Wisconsin Lutheran
- 2013: Søllerød Gold Diggers
- 2015: Elancourt Templiers
- 2016–2017: Potsdam Royals
- 2018: Winterthur Warriors
- Position: Quarterback

Coaching career (HC unless noted)
- 2014: Mesabi Range (OC/QB/WR)
- 2015–2016: Wisconsin Lutheran (GA/RB)
- 2016–2017: Potsdam Royals (OC)
- 2018: Winterthur Warriors (co-OC)
- 2019–2020: Nichols (OC)
- 2021: Hiram (OC)
- 2022: Elmhurst (co-OC/QB)
- 2023: Fitchburg State
- 2024: Manchester (QB)
- 2025–present: Saint Vincent (OC/QB)

Administrative career (AD unless noted)
- 2020: Nichols (director of football operations)

Head coaching record
- Overall: 0–10

Accomplishments and honors

Awards
- NACC co-Freshman of the Year (2009)

Zachary Shaw (born December 10, 1990) is an American football coach. He is the offensive coordinator and quarterbacks coach for Saint Vincent College, positions he has held since 2025. He was the head football coach for Fitchburg State University in 2023. He played college football for Wisconsin Lutheran and played professionally in Europe for the Søllerød Gold Diggers, Elancourt Templiers, Potsdam Royals, and Winterthur Warriors. He also coached for Mesabi Range, Wisconsin Lutheran, Nichols, Hiram, Elmhurst, and Manchester.

== College career ==
Shaw played college football for Wisconsin Lutheran as a quarterback. With the team he threw for a school-record 6,013 yards and 63 touchdowns. He holds the school's record for touchdowns responsible for with 75. He was named Conference Freshman of the Year in 2009 while also earning honorable mention all-conference honors in 2011.

=== Statistics ===
Season	Games		Passing								Rushing			
Season	GP	Record	Comp	Att	Pct	Yards	Avg	TD	Int	Rate	Att	Yards	Avg	TD
Wisconsin Lutheran Warriors
2009	10	4–3	87	189	46.0	1,141	6.0	16	8	116.2	34	-137	-4.0	1
2010	10	6–4	106	260	40.8	1,306	5.0	17	12	95.3	27	-12	-0.4	2
2011	10	6–4	125	231	54.1	1,933	8.4	15	14	133.7	25	-74	-0.3	6
2012	10	7–3	117	224	52.3	1,633	7.3	15	13	124.0	28	1	0.0	3
Career	40	23−14	435	904	48.1	6,013	6.7	63	47	116.6	114	-222	-1.9	12

== Professional career ==
Shaw played professionally in Europe. He first signed with the Søllerød Gold Diggers in Denmark. He also played for Elancourt Templiers in France, Potsdam Royals in Germany, and Winterthur Warriors in Switzerland. He also was the offensive coordinator while also being the starting quarterback for Winterthur and Potsdam.

=== Søllerød Gold Diggers ===
On April 4, 2013, Shaw signed with Søllerød, where he filled in for injured Casper Reinhardt. He led the team in the European Football League playoffs where they lost to the eventual Eurobowl champion Vienna Vikings from the Austrian Football League in the quarter finals.

=== Elancourt Templiers ===
In 2015, Shaw played for Elancourt in the Division 1 Elite Championship after a coaching stint with Mesabi Range.

=== Potsdam Royals ===
In 2016, Shaw played for Potsdam. On June 16, 2017, Shaw broke his collarbone. In 2017 the team was promoted from German Football League 2 GFL2 into the top league the German Football League GFL. In two seasons with the team he compiled a 18–4 record as a starter while also passing for over 4,000 yards and 41 touchdowns.

=== Winterthur Warriors ===
In 2018, Shaw played for Winterhur in the Nationalliga A (American football).

== Coaching career ==
Shaw began his coaching career in 2014 with Mesabi Range College, a National Junior College Athletic Association (NCJAA) school in Virginia, Minnesota, as offensive coordinator, quarterbacks coach, and wide receivers coach. Shaw returned to his alma mater, Wisconsin Lutheran, in 2015, working as a graduate assistant and running backs coach. While playing professionally, Shaw also coached as an offensive coordinator for two teams he played for in Europe, Potsdam and Winterthur.

In 2019, Shaw joined the football staff at Nichols College in Dudley, Massachusetts as the team's offensive coordinator and director of football operations. In 2021, Shaw was hired as offensive coordinator at Hiram College in Hiram, Ohio. The following year, he moved on to Elmhurst University in Elmhurst, Illinois as co-offensive coordinator and quarterbacks coach.

On January 10, 2023, Shaw was hired by Fitchburg State University in Fitchburg, Massachusetts as head football coach. Following a 0–10 record in his inaugural season he resigned in the spring of 2024 for personal reasons.

In spring 2024, Shaw was hired as the quarterbacks coach for Manchester University under head coach Vann Hunt. After one season, Shaw joined Casey Goff at Saint Vincent as his offensive coordinator and quarterbacks coach.

== Head coaching record ==
Year	Team	Overall	Conference	Standing	Bowl/playoffs
Fitchburg State Falcons (Massachusetts State Collegiate Athletic Conference) (2023)
2023	Fitchburg State	0–10	0–8	9th	
Fitchburg State:		0–10	0–8		
Total:		0–10			
