= James McGuire (footballer) =

English footballer

Personal information
- Full name: James McGuire
- Date of birth: 10 December 1883
- Place of birth: Wallsend, England
- Position: Half-back

Senior career*
Years	Team	Apps	(Gls)
1902–1903	North Shields Athletic		
1903–1905	Barnsley	32	(0)
1905–1906	North Shields Athletic		
1906–1913	Sheffield United	61	(1)
1914	North Shields Athletic		
Total		93	(1)
- * Club domestic league appearances and goals

James McGuire (born 10 December 1883) was an English footballer who played in the Football League for Barnsley and Sheffield United.
