= Justin Beaver =

American gridiron football player (born 1984)

Profile
- Position: Running back

Personal information
- Born: October 19, 1984 (age 42); Palmyra, Wisconsin, U.S.
- Listed height: 5 ft 7 in (1.70 m)
- Listed weight: 191 lb (87 kg)

Career information
- College: UW–Whitewater
- NFL draft: 2008: undrafted

Career history
- Green Bay Packers (2008)*; Saskatchewan Roughriders (2009)*
- * Offseason or practice squad member only

Awards and highlights
- Gagliardi Trophy (2007); D3Football.com Offensive Player of the Year (2007)

Justin Beaver (born October 19, 1984) is an American former football running back. He played college football at the University of Wisconsin–Whitewater.

== Early life ==
Beaver grew up in Palmyra, Wisconsin.

== College career ==
Beaver played college football for the Wisconsin–Whitewater Warhawks. As the team's running back, he set numerous rushing records for the Warhawks and the Wisconsin Intercollegiate Athletic Conference. His contributions helped lead the Warhawks to their third consecutive appearance in the Amos Alonzo Stagg Bowl game. During the Championship Game, Beaver ran for 253 yards and one touchdown, topping his single season team record from 2005 leading the Warhawks to a 31–21 win over the University of Mount Union.

Beaver was named 2007 winner of the Gagliardi Trophy—named for John Gagliardi—which is awarded to the outstanding player of the 2007 season of NCAA Division III Football. In three seasons as the featured back, Beaver led the Warhawks to a 41-3 record and three straight Wisconsin Intercollegiate Athletic Conference (WIAC) titles.

== Professional career ==
=== Green Bay Packers ===
After not being selected in the 2008 NFL draft or offered a contract as an undrafted free agent by any National Football League team, Beaver was invited to attend the 2008 rookie mini-camp tryout. After the mini-camp was over, the Packers informed him that they would not be signing him to a contract.

=== Saskatchewan Roughriders ===
Beaver had a workout with the Buffalo Bills, and had a short stint on the practice squad with the Saskatchewan Roughriders. He was placed on the Roughriders' practice roster on June 25, 2009. Beaver did not see action in any regular season games.
