= Euclid Avenue Historic District (Bristol, Virginia) =

Historic district in Virginia, United States

- U.S. National Register of Historic Places
- U.S. Historic district
- Virginia Landmarks Register
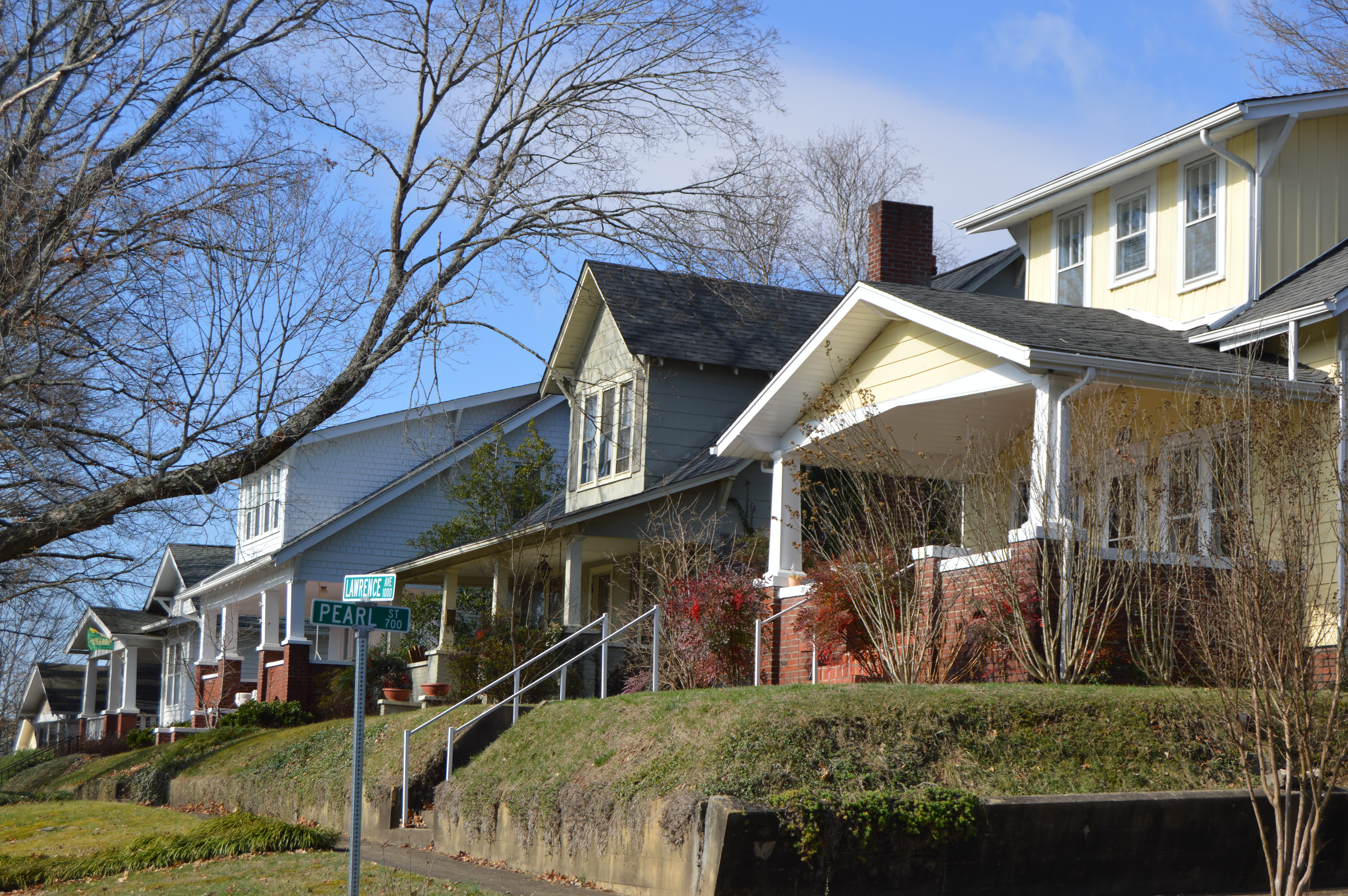
- Houses on Lawrence Street

- Location within Virginia Location within the United States
- Location: Along Sect. of Arlington, Euclid, Fairmount, Glenway, Highland, Lawrence, Piedmont Aves., Chester, Grove, Lindsey, Bristol, Virginia
- Coordinates: 36°36′17″N 82°11′07″W
- Area: 113.8 acres (46.1 ha)
- Architect: Kearfott, Clarence
- Architectural style: Queen Anne, Bungalow/craftsman
- NRHP reference No.: 06000369
- VLR No.: 102-5022

Significant dates
- Added to NRHP: May 10, 2006
- Designated VLR: March 8, 2006

Euclid Avenue Historic District is a national historic district located at Bristol, Virginia. The district encompasses 573 contributing buildings and 3 contributing structures in a predominantly residential area of Bristol. The neighborhood developed in the late-19th and early-20th centuries, and contains primarily one- to two-story frame and brick dwellings constructed from 1890 through the 1940s. Notable buildings include the William G. Lindsey House (c. 1890), Euclid Avenue Baptist Church (1928), R.C. Horner House (1930), architect Clarence B. Kearfott House, James Cecil House, and the dwelling at 611 Arlington Avenue, which is the only example of a Lustron house known to exist in Bristol. The Virginia High School (1914) is separately listed.

It was listed on the National Register of Historic Places in 2006.
