= Kevin DeWall =

American football player and coach (born 1977)

Current position
- Title: Head coach
- Team: Hobart
- Conference: Liberty
- Record: 61–25

Biographical details
- Born: November 4, 1977 (age 49)
- Education: Hobart College

Playing career
- 1999: Hobart
- Position: Free safety

Coaching career (HC unless noted)
- 2000–2002: Hobart (DB)
- 2003–2014: Hobart (OC)
- 2015–2017: Endicott
- 2018–present: Hobart

Head coaching record
- Overall: 74–42
- Bowls: 3–2
- Tournaments: 0–1 (NCAA D-III playoffs)

Accomplishments and honors

Championships
- Liberty (2024)

Kevin DeWall is an American college football coach. He is the head football coach for Hobart and William Smith Colleges, a position he has held since 2018. From 2015 to 2017, DeWall was head football coach at Endicott College in Beverly, Massachusetts.

DeWall previously served in a number of coaching roles at Hobart. He began his coaching career with the Hobart Statesmen football program in 2000, serving as the defensive backs coach for three seasons. He later served as offensive coordinator from 2003 to 2014.

DeWall led some of Hobart's most productive teams in program history, including guiding an offense that generated eight of the top nine scoring seasons and eight of the top 10 seasons of total offense in school history. In 2012 and 2014, Hobart football advanced to the NCAA quarterfinals.

In 2008, DeWall was inducted into the Waterloo Athletic Hall of Fame in Waterloo, New York. He has a bachelor's degree in biology from Hobart College.

== Head coaching record ==
Year	Team	Overall	Conference	Standing	Bowl/playoffs
Endicott Gulls (New England Football Conference) (2015–2017)
2015	Endicott	5–5	5–2	T–2nd	
2016	Endicott	5–5	5–2	3rd	
2017	Endicott	3–7	2–3	4th	
Endicott:		13–17	12–7		
Hobart Statesmen (Liberty League) (2018–present)
2018	Hobart	5–4	3–2	T–3rd	
2019	Hobart	9–2	4–2	T–2nd	W New York
2020–21	No team—COVID-19				
2021	Hobart	9–2	4–2	T–3rd	W Asa S. Bushnell
2022	Hobart	7–4	4–2	3rd	L Asa S. Bushnell
2023	Hobart	8–3	4–2	3rd	L Clayton Chapman
2024	Hobart	9–2	6–0	1st	L NCAA Division III Second Round
2025	Hobart	6–5	4–3	4th	W James Lynah
2026	Hobart	7–3	5–2	3rd	W Clayton Chapman
Hobart:		61–25	34–15		
Total:		74–42			
