= David Flynn (Gaelic footballer) =

Irish Gaelic footballer

Personal information
- Native name: Daithí Ó Floinn (Irish)
- Born: Ballinasloe, Ireland
- Height: 1.83 m (6 ft 0 in)

Sport
- Sport: Gaelic Football
- Position: Centre Back
Club
- Years: Club
- Clann na nGael
Inter-county
- Years: County
- Roscommon

David Flynn is a Gaelic footballer from Clonown in County Roscommon. He was captain of the 2006 All-Ireland Minor Football Championship winning team. He plays with the Clann na nGael club.
