= Jim Maguire (Irish footballer) =

Irish footballer

Jim Maguire was an Irish footballer who played as a full back. He was born in Dublin.

== Career ==
He joined Shamrock Rovers in 1927. His brother Mick also played at Glenmalure Park for the Hoops and their father William Maguire was one of the founders of Shamrock Rovers. Former Rovers Chairman Tony Maguire is his son.

He won one cap for the Irish Free State in a 4–0 friendly win over Belgium at Dalymount Park on 20 April 1929.

== Sources ==
- Paul Doolan; Robert Goggins. The Hoops. ISBN 0-7171-2121-6.
- Jim Maguire at WorldFootball.net
