= Jim McGuire (American football) =

American football coach (born 1962)

Biographical details
- Born: c. 1962 (age 63–64); Hudson, Massachusetts, U.S.

Coaching career (HC unless noted)
- 1998: Dean (GA)
- 1999–2000: Fitchburg State (RB)
- 2001: Assumption (RB)
- 2002–2005: Fitchburg State (OC)
- 2008–2010: Assumption (RB)
- 2011: Fitchburg State (OC)
- 2012: Assumption (RB)
- 2013–2014: WPI (RB)
- 2015–2017: Fitchburg State (ST/RB)
- 2018–2019: Fitchburg State
- 2022: Nichols (RB)

Head coaching record
- Overall: 4–16

James McGuire (born c. 1962) is an American college football coach. He was most recently the running backs coach for the Nichols College in 2022. He previously was a coach for Dean, Fitchburg State, Assumption, and WPI. He was the head coach for the Fitchburg State Falcons football team from 2018 to 2019.

== Head coaching record ==
Year	Team	Overall	Conference	Standing	Bowl/playoffs
Fitchburg State Falcons (Massachusetts State Collegiate Athletic Conference) (2018–2019)
2018	Fitchburg State	2–8	2–6	7th	
2019	Fitchburg State	2–8	1–7	8th	
Fitchburg State:		4–16	3–13		
Total:		4–16			
