= Framingham Public School District =

School district in Massachusetts, United States

Address
- 19 Flagg Drive Framingham, Massachusetts, 01702; United States
- Coordinates: 42°17′31″N 71°24′29″W

District information
- Established: 1650; 376 years ago
- Superintendent: Robert A. Tremblay
- NCES District ID: 2504980

Students and staff
- Students: 8,733 (2020–2021)
- Staff: 733.21 (on an FTE basis)
- Student–teacher ratio: 11.91

Other information
- Website: www.framingham.k12.ma.us

The Framingham Public School District or Framingham Public Schools (FPS) comprises thirteen public schools in the city of Framingham, Massachusetts. It is classified as one of the state's 24 urban school districts, while the district generally describes itself as urban/suburban. The school district's main offices are located at 73 Mount Wayte Avenue in Framingham, in what is known as the Perini building.

During the late 1990s and early 2000s Framingham upgraded its schools, replacing the former Cameron school with a completely new school and performed major renovations to the Wilson elementary school, the McCarthy elementary school and the high school. Two public school buildings that were mothballed due to financial issues or population drops were leased to the Metrowest Jewish Day School (at the former Juniper Hill Elementary) and Mass Bay Community College (at the former Farley Middle school). At some point in the 1980s, the district sold off some of its older, smaller schools that were no longer being used, including Lincoln, Roosevelt and Washington. These schools were originally constructed in the 1930s as part of several WPA buildings. Additionally, the former Memorial school on Hollis street was closed when high levels of asbestos was found in the building. The Lincoln school is now a medical office building, Memorial and Roosevelt are now senior citizen housing and Washington demolished and replaced with a park.

The Framingham School Department traces its origins to 1706, when the town hired its first schoolmaster, Deacon Joshua Hemenway. Although Framingham had a schoolmaster from that time, it did not obtain its first public school building until 1716. The town's first secondary school, Framingham Academy, opened in 1792. However, the academy was eventually closed because of financial difficulties and questions regarding the legality of municipal funding for a private school. The first town-operated high school opened in 1852 and has operated continuously at various locations throughout Framingham ever since.

The Superintendent of Schools is Dr. Robert Tremblay.

== Public schools ==
B.L.O.C.K.S (Building Learning Opportunities for Children's Kindergarten Success) Preschool is a program taught by certified early childhood teachers. Half-day, full-day, and extended-day options are available for students. There is a maximum of 18 children per class along with 1 teacher and 1 aide. B.L.O.C.K.S fosters a flexible and nurturing atmosphere that meets children's needs individually and as part of a group. Sessions are offered at Juniper Hill School and Framingham High School.

=== Elementary schools ===
All Framingham elementary schools feature kindergarten through grade five.

- Barbieri School
  The Barbieri school opened in 1974 as a middle school, one of three new middle schools at the time, and is named for local fire department LT. Paul F. Barbieri. The school specializes in bilingual language and communication based teaching. It has been cited as a Commonwealth Compass School. It is located on Dudley Road, in a complex of parkland, athletic fields and schools on the west shore of Farm Pond. The school is one of the four elementary schools with a Dual Language program. The standard program was eliminated in the 2009–2010 school year.

Facilities:
- 30 classrooms on four floors
- Cafeteria
- Auditorium
- Gymnasium
- Olympic sized pool (closed)
- In-school library
- 7 baseball fields (in adjacent athletic facility)
- Outdoor basketball court (in adjacent athletic facility)
- 1 multi-use athletic field (football/soccer/lacrosse)

- Brophy School
  The Brophy school opened in 1968 and is named for local Framingham educators Rose and Anna Brophy. Its school slogan is "Sharing One World at Brophy." It is located on Pleasant Street (Route 30), about one mile west of Temple Street. It shares its building design with the Potter Road School. https://www.framingham.k12.ma.us/Domain/9

Facilities:
- 26 classrooms on two floors
- Shared cafeteria/auditorium
- Gymnasium
- In-school Library Media Center
- Central courtyard
- Community playground
- 3 multi-use athletic fields (football/soccer/lacrosse)
- Outdoor basketball court

- Charlotte A. Dunning Elementary School
  Built in the early 1960s and originally called The Frost Street Elementary School, it was renamed in 1965 after local politician Charlotte A. Dunning. It is located on Frost Street, in a complex of nature paths, athletic fields, farmland and schools adjacent to the Hultman Aqueduct. It shares a building design with the Hemenway School.

Facilities:
- 30 classrooms
- Shared cafeteria/auditorium
- Gymnasium
- In-school library
- Central courtyard
- Community playground
- 2 baseball fields (shared with Walsh Middle School)
- 1 multi-use athletic field (football/soccer/lacrosse/track & field, shared with Walsh Middle School)
- 1 outdoor basketball court (shared with Walsh Middle School)
- 4 outdoor asphalt tennis courts (shared with Walsh Middle School)

- The Joshua Hemenway Elementary School
  Hemenway opened in 1961 and is named after Framingham's first school headmaster, Deacon Joshua Hemenway. Hemenway is a multiple intelligences school that teaches using real-life experiences, hands-on science and current world events. It is located on Water Street, approximately half a mile east of Edgell Road. It shares a building design with the Dunning School.

Facilities:
- 30 classrooms, 2 temporary classroom facilities
- Shared cafeteria/auditorium
- Gymnasium
- In-school library
- Central courtyard
- Community playground
- 1 baseball field

- The George P. King Elementary School

King Elementary school is Framingham's first STEAM school. STEAM (Science, Technology, Engineering, Art, and Math) is essentially science and technology interpreted through engineering and the arts, all based in mathematical elements.

- Miriam F. McCarthy School
  McCarthy was built in the mid-1950s and expanded in 1995 and is named after local educator Miriam F. McCarthy. McCarthy places a focus on literary arts in an effort to teach its students to become proficient and strategic readers and writers. It is located on Flagg Drive in a complex of schools and athletic fields.

Facilities:
- 30 classrooms
- Shared cafeteria/auditorium
- Gymnasium
- In-school library and computer lab
- Community playground
- 1 baseball field (shared with Fuller Middle School)
- 2 baseball fields (in adjacent athletic facility)
- 2 multi-use athletic fields (football/soccer/lacrosse, in adjacent athletic facility)

- Potter Road Elementary School
  Built in 1969, along with the Brophy School, Potter Road is the only school besides FHS that is not named after an individual. Potter Road emphasizes a plan for lifelong learning that teaches students that education is not confined to the classroom and that personal growth continues beyond the school doors. Potter Road is located on its name-sake road, halfway between Water Street and Elm Street.

Facilities:
- 36 classrooms on two floors
- Shared cafeteria/auditorium
- Gymnasium
- In-school library and computer lab
- Central courtyard
- Community playground
- 2 baseball fields
- 1 multi-use athletic field (football/soccer/lacrosse)
- 1 outdoor basketball court

- Mary E. Stapleton Elementary
  Built in the 1920s as the Saxonville School, it was expanded in 1980 and renamed for local educator and principal Mary E. Stapleton. Stapleton implements a school wide theme focusing on environmental education which uses hands-on learning and features the Carol Getchell Nature Trail along the Sudbury River. In 2006, the Commonwealth of Massachusetts cited Stapleton as "Environmental Eagle" due to the success of its recycling program. It is located on Elm Street, just north of the Concord Street/Central Street/Elm Street intersection.

Facilities
- 30 classrooms on two floors
- Shared cafeteria/auditorium
- Gymnasium
- In-school library and computer lab
- Community playground

- Harmony Grove, formerly known as Wilson Elementary School
  Wilson was built in the 1940s and underwent a major renovation/expansion in the early 2000s, and is named for President Woodrow Wilson. The Global Studies program expands on the standard curriculum by adding age-appropriate activities and modules that help children gain a greater personal knowledge of the world. It is located on Leland Street, just south of the Beaver Street/Kendall Avenue/Leland Street intersection. It is the last of the schools in Framingham named for US Presidents, with the former Washington and Lincoln schools closed and sold off to private groups.

Facilities
- 44 classrooms on two floors
- Shared cafeteria/auditorium
- Gymnasium
- In-school library and computer lab
- Community playground

=== Middle schools ===
All Framingham middle schools feature grades six through eight.

- Cameron Middle School
  The original Cameron Middle School opened in 1974 and is named after Framingham educator, Dr. Walter C. Cameron. Cameron was originally one of three new middle school buildings built by the town using the same architectural design, the others being Farley and Barberi. The school was closed in 1982 and demolished in 2000. The current school opened in 2002. Its school colors are yellow and green and the mascot is the Cameron Cougars. In the 2006–07 school year, the student council at Cameron conducted a survey of the student body of the school about changing the name mascot from the Cameron Comets; from a list of ten possible names, the name Cougars was chosen. The school is located on Elm Street across from Norton's Pond.
- Fuller Middle School
  The Fuller Middle School Opened in 1998 in the former Framingham South High School building. It is named after Dr. Solomon Carter Fuller (1872–1953), a pioneering African-American in the field of psychology and his wife Meta Vaux Warrick Fuller (1877–1968), a well-known sculptor and artist in the 1920s. Its school colors are black (Onyx) and green (Jade) and the mascot is Fuller Falcons. The school is located on Flagg Drive across from the McCarthy Elementary School. It has been cited as a Commonwealth Compass School.
- Walsh Middle School
  Walsh Middle School opened in 1969 and is named after Framingham educator, William S. Walsh. Its school colors are maroon and gold and the mascot is the Walsh Wildcats. The school is located on Brook Street, in a complex of nature paths, athletic fields, farmland and schools adjacent to the Hultman Aqueduct and the Dunning Elementary School.

=== High school ===
- Framingham High School (grades nine through 12)

From 1963 until 1990, the town operated two independent high schools; Framingham North High School and Framingham South High School. The two separate high schools often competed with each other in sports, causing a friendly rivalry. Due to falling population, the two schools were combined at the campus of Framingham North, which was renamed Framingham High School. (The Framingham South High school building was made into the Fuller Middle School.)

The two high schools were distinguished by their colors and mascots: North had the Spartans in green and gold while South had the Flyers in blue and white. When the time for the merger of the schools came, the district held an election to determine the fate of the colors and mascots. The winning combination was to be the Spartans in blue and white, however alumni of the original Framingham High raised a protest that the town should revert to the original mascot and colors which happened to be used by Framingham South. The School Committee agreed with the alumni and overrode the students choice.

- Eugene Thayer Campus (grades nine through 12)
  The Thayer Campus is for students who do not learn well in a typical school setting.
