= 2021 NCAA Division III football season =

American college football season

- Total No. of teams: 239
- Preseason AP No. 1: Mary Hardin–Baylor
- Regular season: September 4 – November 13, 2021
- Playoffs: November 20 – December 17, 2021
- National championship: Tom Benson Hall of Fame Stadium; Canton, OH; December 17, 2021
- Champion: Mary Hardin–Baylor
- Gagliardi Trophy: Blaine Hawkins (QB), Central (IA)

The 2021 NCAA Division III football season was the component of the 2021 college football season organized by the NCAA at the Division III level in the United States. The regular season began on September 4 and ended on November 13.

The season's playoffs were played between November 20 and December 17, and culminated in the national championship, also known as the Stagg Bowl, at the Tom Benson Hall of Fame Stadium in Canton, Ohio. The Mary Hardin–Baylor Crusaders beat the North Central Cardinals in the title game, 57–24.

== Conference changes and new programs ==
=== Membership changes ===
Team	Former conference	New conference
Austin	SAA	American Southwest
Becker	CCC Football	College closed
Emory & Henry	Old Dominion	NCAA Division II independent
Finlandia	Michigan	Upper Midwest
Iowa Wesleyan	Upper Midwest	North Star (NAIA)
Keystone	Returning program, last competed 1947	ECFC
Louisiana College	American Southwest	Sooner (NAIA)
Macalester	Midwest	Minnesota
Maine Maritime	NEWMAC (Note: Already did not play in 2020–21 but their football conference did not hold a football season in 2020–21.)	Suspended program
Occidental	Southern California	Dropped program
St. Norbert (Note: Already moved in 2020–21 but did not play during the spring 2020–21 season.)	Midwest	NACC
St. Scholastica	Upper Midwest	Minnesota
St. Thomas (MN)	Minnesota	Pioneer (NCAA Division I FCS)
Wesley	New Jersey	College acquired by Delaware State

== Conference standings ==
2021 American Rivers Conference football standings
	Conf.			Overall
Team	W		L	W		L
No. 6 Central (IA) $^	8	–	0	12	–	1
Coe	6	–	2	8	–	2
Wartburg	6	–	2	7	–	3
Dubuque	5	–	3	6	–	4
Buena Vista	4	–	4	5	–	5
Loras	4	–	4	4	–	6
Nebraska Wesleyan	2	–	6	4	–	6
Simpson (IA)	1	–	7	1	–	9
Luther	0	–	8	0	–	10
$ – Conference champion; ^ – NCAA Division III playoff participant; Rankings from AFCA Poll

2021 American Southwest Conference football standings
	Conf.			Overall
Team	W		L	W		L
No. 1 Mary Hardin–Baylor $^	9	–	0	15	–	0
No. 10 Hardin–Simmons	8	–	1	9	–	1
Belhaven	6	–	3	7	–	3
Howard Payne	6	–	3	7	–	3
East Texas Baptist	4	–	5	5	–	5
Southwestern (TX)	4	–	5	4	–	6
Texas Lutheran	3	–	6	3	–	7
McMurry	2	–	7	2	–	7
Sul Ross	2	–	7	2	–	7
Austin	1	–	8	1	–	8
$ – Conference champion; ^ – NCAA Division III playoff participant; Rankings from AFCA Poll

2021 Centennial Conference football standings
	Conf.			Overall
Team	W		L	W		L
No. 7 Muhlenberg +^	8	–	1	11	–	2
No. 13 Johns Hopkins +^	8	–	1	10	–	2
Susquehanna	7	–	2	9	–	2
Ursinus	6	–	3	7	–	4
Franklin & Marshall	5	–	4	6	–	5
Dickinson	4	–	5	4	–	6
Moravian	3	–	6	3	–	7
McDaniel	2	–	7	2	–	8
Gettysburg	1	–	8	1	–	9
Juniata	1	–	8	1	–	9
+ – Conference co-champions; ^ – NCAA Division III playoff participant; Rankings from AFCA Poll

2021 College Conference of Illinois and Wisconsin football standings
	Conf.			Overall
Team	W		L	W		L
No. 2 North Central (IL) $^	9	–	0	13	–	1
No. 9 Wheaton (IL) ^	8	–	1	10	–	2
Washington University	7	–	2	7	–	4
Carroll (WI)	5	–	4	6	–	4
Augustana (IL)	4	–	5	5	–	5
Carthage	3	–	6	3	–	7
Illinois Wesleyan	3	–	6	3	–	7
Millikin	3	–	6	3	–	7
North Park	2	–	7	2	–	8
Elmhurst	1	–	8	1	–	9
$ – Conference champion; ^ – NCAA Division III playoff participant; Rankings from AFCA Poll

2021 Commonwealth Coast Football standings
	Conf.			Overall
Team	W		L	W		L
Endicott +^	5	–	1	8	–	3
Western New England +	5	–	1	7	–	4
Salve Regina	4	–	2	8	–	2
Husson	4	–	2	7	–	3
New England	2	–	4	4	–	5
Curry	1	–	5	3	–	6
Nichols	0	–	6	2	–	8
+ – Conference co-champions; ^ – NCAA Division III playoff participant

2021 Eastern Collegiate Football Conference standings
	Conf.			Overall
Team	W		L	W		L
Anna Maria +^	5	–	1	7	–	3
Alfred State +	5	–	1	6	–	5
Castleton	4	–	2	6	–	4
Gallaudet	3	–	3	5	–	3
Maritime	3	–	3	3	–	6
Dean	1	–	5	2	–	8
Keystone	0	–	6	0	–	10
+ – Conference co-champions; ^ – NCAA Division III playoff participant

2021 Empire 8 Athletic Conference football standings
	Conf.			Overall
Team	W		L	W		L
No. 16 Cortland $^	6	–	0	11	–	1
Brockport	4	–	2	8	–	3
Alfred	4	–	2	5	–	5
Utica	3	–	3	6	–	4
St. John Fisher	2	–	4	4	–	6
Hartwick	1	–	5	2	–	7
Morrisville State	0	–	5	2	–	8
$ – Conference champion; ^ – NCAA Division III playoff participant; Rankings from AFCA Poll

2021 Heartland Collegiate Athletic Conference football standings
	Conf.			Overall
Team	W		L	W		L
Rose–Hulman $^	7	–	0	8	–	3
Mount St. Joseph	5	–	2	6	–	4
Franklin (IN)	4	–	3	6	–	4
Hanover	4	–	3	5	–	5
Bluffton	3	–	4	4	–	6
Manchester	3	–	4	3	–	7
Anderson (IN)	1	–	6	1	–	9
Defiance	1	–	6	1	–	9
$ – Conference champion; ^ – NCAA Division III playoff participant

2021 Liberty League football standings
	Conf.			Overall
Team	W		L	W		L
No. 14 RPI +^	5	–	1	11	–	2
No. 24 Ithaca +	5	–	1	8	–	2
Hobart	4	–	2	9	–	2
Union (NY)	4	–	2	8	–	2
St. Lawrence	2	–	4	5	–	5
Rochester (NY)	1	–	5	3	–	7
Buffalo State	0	–	6	0	–	10
+ – Conference co-champions; ^ – NCAA Division III playoff participant; Rankings from AFCA Poll

2021 Massachusetts State Collegiate Athletic Conference football standings
	Conf.			Overall
Team	W		L	W		L
Framingham State $^	8	–	0	8	–	3
UMass Dartmouth	6	–	2	9	–	2
Bridgewater State	6	–	2	6	–	4
Plymouth State	5	–	3	5	–	5
Western Connecticut	4	–	4	5	–	5
Massachusetts Maritime	3	–	5	4	–	6
Worcester State	3	–	5	3	–	7
Westfield State	1	–	7	1	–	9
Fitchburg State	0	–	8	0	–	10
$ – Conference champion; ^ – NCAA Division III playoff participant

2021 Michigan Intercollegiate Athletic Association football standings
	Conf.			Overall
Team	W		L	W		L
No. 25 Albion +^	5	–	1	9	–	2
Hope +	5	–	1	8	–	2
Trine	4	–	2	6	–	4
Olivet	3	–	3	7	–	3
Adrian	3	–	3	5	–	5
Alma	1	–	5	5	–	5
Kalamazoo	0	–	6	1	–	9
$ – Conference champion; ^ – NCAA Division III playoff participant; Rankings from AFCA Poll

2021 Middle Atlantic Conference football standings
	Conf.			Overall
Team	W		L	W		L
No. 11 Delaware Valley $^	8	–	0	11	–	1
Lycoming	6	–	2	8	–	3
FDU–Florham	5	–	3	7	–	4
Widener	5	–	3	7	–	4
Stevenson	5	–	3	5	–	6
Wilkes	5	–	3	6	–	4
Lebanon Valley	4	–	4	5	–	5
King's (PA)	3	–	5	5	–	5
Misericordia	2	–	6	3	–	6
Albright	1	–	7	2	–	8
Alvernia	0	–	8	0	–	10
$ – Conference champion; ^ – NCAA Division III playoff participant; Rankings from AFCA Poll

2021 Midwest Conference football standings
	Conf.			Overall
Team	W		L	W		L
No. 23 Lake Forest $^	9	–	0	10	–	1
Monmouth (IL)	8	–	1	8	–	2
Chicago	7	–	2	8	–	2
Ripon	5	–	3	6	–	3
Illinois College	5	–	4	5	–	5
Cornell (IA)	4	–	5	4	–	6
Knox	3	–	6	3	–	6
Grinnell	2	–	7	2	–	8
Lawrence	1	–	7	2	–	7
Beloit	0	–	9	0	–	10
$ – Conference champion; ^ – NCAA Division III playoff participant; Rankings from AFCA Poll

2021 Minnesota Intercollegiate Athletic Conference football standings
	Div			Conf.			Overall
Team	W		L	W		L	W		L
Northwoods Division
No. 8 Saint John's (MN) x$^	4	–	0	8	–	0	11	–	1
Gustavus Adolphus	3	–	1	6	–	2	8	–	2
St. Olaf	2	–	2	4	–	4	5	–	5
Carleton	1	–	3	5	–	3	7	–	3
St. Scholastica	0	–	4	0	–	8	0	–	8
Skyline Division
No. 18 Bethel (MN) x^	4	–	0	6	–	2	8	–	3
Concordia–Moorhead	3	–	1	3	–	5	4	–	6
Augsburg	2	–	2	4	–	4	4	–	6
Macalester	1	–	3	2	–	6	3	–	7
Hamline	0	–	4	2	–	6	4	–	6
Championship: Saint John's (MN) 29, Bethel (MN) 28
$ – Conference champion; x – Division champion/co-champions; ^ – NCAA Division III playoff participant; As of November 17, 2021; Rankings from AFCA Poll

2021 New England Small College Athletic Conference football standings
	Conf.			Overall
Team	W		L	W		L
Williams $	9	–	0	9	–	0
Trinity (CT)	8	–	1	8	–	1
Wesleyan	6	–	3	6	–	3
Amherst	5	–	4	5	–	4
Colby	4	–	5	4	–	5
Tufts	4	–	5	4	–	5
Bates	3	–	6	3	–	6
Middlebury	3	–	6	3	–	6
Hamilton	2	–	7	2	–	7
Bowdoin	1	–	8	1	–	8
$ – Conference champion

2021 New England Women's and Men's Athletic Conference football standings
	Conf.			Overall
Team	W		L	W		L
Springfield $^	6	–	0	7	–	4
Merchant Marine	5	–	1	9	–	1
Catholic University	4	–	2	6	–	4
MIT	3	–	3	5	–	4
WPI	2	–	4	3	–	7
Norwich	1	–	5	2	–	8
Coast Guard	0	–	6	2	–	8
$ – Conference champion; ^ – NCAA Division III playoff participant

2021 New Jersey Athletic Conference football standings
	Conf.			Overall
Team	W		L	W		L
No. 17 Salisbury $^	6	–	0	8	–	2
Kean	4	–	2	4	–	5
Christopher Newport	3	–	3	5	–	5
William Paterson	2	–	4	4	–	6
TCNJ	2	–	4	3	–	6
Montclair State	2	–	4	3	–	7
Rowan	2	–	4	2	–	7
$ – Conference champion; ^ – NCAA Division III playoff participant; Rankings from AFCA Poll

2021 North Coast Athletic Conference football standings
	Conf.			Overall
Team	W		L	W		L
DePauw $^	8	–	1	9	–	3
Ohio Wesleyan	7	–	2	8	–	2
Wittenberg	7	–	2	7	–	3
Wabash	6	–	3	7	–	3
Denison	6	–	3	6	–	4
Wooster	5	–	4	6	–	4
Kenyon	3	–	6	4	–	7
Allegheny	2	–	7	3	–	7
Oberlin	1	–	8	1	–	9
Hiram	0	–	9	1	–	9
$ – Conference champion; ^ – NCAA Division III playoff participant

2021 Northern Athletics Collegiate Conference football standings
	Conf.			Overall
Team	W		L	W		L
Aurora $^	8	–	0	8	–	3
Benedictine (IL)	7	–	1	8	–	2
Lakeland	6	–	2	8	–	2
Concordia (WI)	4	–	4	6	–	4
St. Norbert	4	–	4	6	–	6
Wisconsin Lutheran	3	–	5	3	–	7
Eureka	2	–	6	2	–	8
Concordia (IL)	1	–	7	3	–	7
Rockford	1	–	7	2	–	8
$ – Conference champion; ^ – NCAA Division III playoff participant

2021 Northwest Conference football standings
	Conf.			Overall
Team	W		L	W		L
No. 5 Linfield $^	7	–	0	11	–	1
George Fox	6	–	1	6	–	3
Pacific (OR)	5	–	2	6	–	3
Whitworth	4	–	3	7	–	3
Pacific Lutheran	3	–	4	4	–	5
Lewis & Clark	2	–	5	3	–	6
Puget Sound	1	–	6	1	–	9
Willamette	0	–	7	1	–	9
$ – Conference champion; ^ – NCAA Division III playoff participant; Rankings from AFCA Poll

2021 Ohio Athletic Conference football standings
	Conf.			Overall
Team	W		L	W		L
No. 4 Mount Union $^	9	–	0	13	–	1
Baldwin Wallace	7	–	2	8	–	2
Heidelberg	7	–	2	8	–	2
John Carroll	7	–	2	7	–	3
Muskingum	4	–	5	5	–	5
Marietta	4	–	5	4	–	6
Ohio Northern	3	–	6	4	–	6
Wilmington (OH)	2	–	7	2	–	8
Capital	1	–	8	2	–	8
Otterbein	1	–	8	1	–	9
$ – Conference champion; ^ – NCAA Division III playoff participant; Rankings from AFCA Poll

|

2021 Old Dominion Athletic Conference football standings
	Conf.			Overall
Team	W		L	W		L
Washington and Lee +^	5	–	1	8	–	3
No. 20 Randolph–Macon +	5	–	1	9	–	1
Hampden–Sydney	4	–	2	5	–	5
Shenandoah	3	–	3	7	–	4
Ferrum	3	–	3	6	–	4
Bridgewater	1	–	5	4	–	6
Guilford	0	–	6	1	–	8
+ – Conference co-champions; ^ – NCAA Division III playoff participant; Rankings from AFCA Poll

2021 Presidents' Athletic Conference football standings
	Conf.			Overall
Team	W		L	W		L
Carnegie Mellon +^	8	–	1	8	–	2
Westminster (PA) +	8	–	1	8	–	3
Washington & Jefferson	7	–	2	8	–	3
Grove City	6	–	3	8	–	3
Case Western Reserve	5	–	4	6	–	4
Saint Vincent	4	–	5	5	–	6
Geneva	4	–	5	4	–	6
Waynesburg	2	–	7	2	–	8
Bethany (WV)	1	–	8	1	–	9
Thiel	0	–	9	0	–	10
+ – Conference co-champions; ^ – NCAA Division III playoff participant

2021 Southern Athletic Association football standings
	Conf.			Overall
Team	W		L	W		L
No. 15 Trinity (TX) $^	7	–	0	9	–	1
No. 19 Birmingham–Southern ^	6	–	1	10	–	2
Centre	5	–	2	8	–	2
Berry	4	–	3	6	–	4
Rhodes	2	–	5	3	–	7
Hendrix	2	–	5	3	–	7
Millsaps	2	–	5	2	–	8
Sewanee	0	–	7	0	–	10
$ – Conference champion; ^ – NCAA Division III playoff participant; Rankings from AFCA Poll

2021 Southern California Intercollegiate Athletic Conference football standings
	Conf.			Overall
Team	W		L	W		L
No. 21 Redlands $^	6	–	0	8	–	2
Claremont-Mudd-Scripps	4	–	2	7	–	3
Chapman	4	–	2	7	–	3
Cal Lutheran	3	–	3	5	–	3
Pomona-Pitzer	2	–	4	4	–	5
La Verne	2	–	4	3	–	6
Whittier	0	–	6	0	–	9
$ – Conference champion; ^ – NCAA Division III playoff participant; Rankings from AFCA Poll

2021 Upper Midwest Athletic Conference football standings
	Conf.			Overall
Team	W		L	W		L
Greenville $^	6	–	0	8	–	3
Martin Luther	5	–	1	5	–	4
Minnesota–Morris	4	–	2	5	–	5
Northwestern (MN)	2	–	3	2	–	7
Westminster (MO)	2	–	4	3	–	5
Crown	1	–	4	1	–	8
Finlandia	0	–	6	0	–	9
$ – Conference champion; ^ – NCAA Division III playoff participant

2021 USA South Athletic Conference football standings
	Conf.			Overall
Team	W		L	W		L
Huntingdon $^	8	–	0	8	–	3
Methodist	7	–	1	7	–	2
Brevard	6	–	2	6	–	4
Averett	4	–	4	5	–	5
Maryville (TN)	4	–	4	4	–	6
North Carolina Wesleyan	4	–	4	4	–	6
LaGrange	2	–	6	2	–	8
Southern Virginia	1	–	7	2	–	8
Greensboro	0	–	8	0	–	10
$ – Conference champion; ^ – NCAA Division III playoff participant

2021 Wisconsin Intercollegiate Athletic Conference football standings
	Conf.			Overall
Team	W		L	W		L
No. 3 Wisconsin–Whitewater $^	7	–	0	13	–	1
No. 12 Wisconsin–La Crosse ^	6	–	1	9	–	3
No. 22 Wisconsin–River Falls	5	–	2	9	–	2
Wisconsin–Oshkosh	4	–	3	6	–	3
Wisconsin–Platteville	3	–	4	4	–	6
Wisconsin–Stout	2	–	5	5	–	5
Wisconsin–Eau Claire	1	–	6	3	–	7
Wisconsin–Stevens Point	0	–	7	2	–	8
$ – Conference champion; ^ – NCAA Division III playoff participant; Rankings from AFCA Poll

== Postseason ==
=== Qualification ===
==== Automatic bids (27) ====
Conference	Team	Appearance	Last
American Southwest Conference	Mary Hardin–Baylor	17th	2019
American Rivers Conference	Central (IA)	22nd	2019
Centennial Conference	Muhlenberg	10th	2019
College Conference of Illinois and Wisconsin	North Central (IL)	13th	2019
Commonwealth Coast Football	Endicott	3rd	2013
Eastern Collegiate Football Conference	Anna Maria	1st	—
Empire 8	Cortland	10th	2015
Heartland Collegiate Athletic Conference	Rose–Hulman	2nd	2016
Liberty League	RPI	7th	2018
Massachusetts State Collegiate Athletic Conference	Framingham State	6th	2019
Michigan Intercollegiate Athletic Association	Albion	12th	2015
Middle Atlantic Conference	Delaware Valley	10th	2019
Midwest Conference	Lake Forest	2nd	2002
Minnesota Intercollegiate Athletic Conference	Saint John's (MN)	27th	2019
New England Women's and Men's Athletic Conference	Springfield	7th	2017
New Jersey Athletic Conference	Salisbury	12th	2019
North Coast Athletic Conference	DePauw	3rd	2010
Northern Athletics Collegiate Conference	Aurora	6th	2019
Northwest Conference	Linfield	16th	2019
Ohio Athletic Conference	Mount Union	32nd	2019
Old Dominion Athletic Conference	Washington and Lee	6th	2017
Presidents' Athletic Conference	Carnegie Mellon	7th	2006
Southern Athletic Association	Trinity (TX)	13th	2011
Southern California Intercollegiate Athletic Conference	Redlands	10th	2019
Upper Midwest Athletic Conference	Greenville	1st	—
USA South Athletic Conference	Huntingdon	6th	2019
Wisconsin Intercollegiate Athletic Conference	Wisconsin–Whitewater	18th	2019

==== At-large bids (5) ====
Team	Conference	Appearance	Last
Bethel (MN) Royals	MIAC	10th	2018
Birmingham-Southern	SAA	1st	—
Johns Hopkins	Centennial	11th	2018
Wheaton (IL)	CCIW	12th	2019
Wisconsin–La Crosse	WIAC	12th	2006

=== Bracket ===
First round November 20
*	Saint John's (MN)	41
Lake Forest	14
*	Linfield	44
Redlands	10
*	Mary Hardin–Baylor	13
Trinity (TX)	3
*	Birmingham–Southern	24
Huntingdon	14
*	Wisconsin–Whitewater	69
Greenville	7
*	DePauw	26
Rose–Hulman	21
*	Central (IA)	61
Bethel (MN)	35
*	Wheaton (IL)	63
Aurora	31
*	North Central (IL)	w/o
Carnegie Mellon	(Note: The day before the game was scheduled to be played, Carnegie Mellon announced that it would withdraw from the tournament due to a number of positive COVID-19 tests among members of the team and the game was declared as a no contest.)
*	Albion	23
Wisconsin–La Crosse	58
*	Cortland	26
Springfield	21
*	Endicott	14
RPI	20
*	Mount Union	52
Washington and Lee	0
*	Salisbury	20
Johns Hopkins	45
*	Delaware Valley	62
Anna Maria	10
*	Muhlenberg	45
Framingham State	0

Second round November 27
*	Saint John's (MN)	28
Linfield	31
*	Mary Hardin–Baylor	42
Birmingham–Southern	7
*	Wisconsin–Whitewater	45
DePauw	0
*	Central (IA)	30
Wheaton (IL)	28
*	North Central (IL)	34
Wisconsin–La Crosse	20
*	Cortland	14
RPI	21
*	Mount Union	45
Johns Hopkins	35
*	Delaware Valley	0
Muhlenberg	14

Quarterfinals; December 4
Linfield	24
Mary Hardin–Baylor	49
Wisconsin–Whitewater	51
Central (IA)	21
North Central (IL)	55
RPI	6
Mount Union	35
Muhlenberg	29

Semifinals; December 11
Mary Hardin–Baylor	24
Wisconsin–Whitewater	7
North Central (IL)	26
Mount Union	13

Championship; Stagg Bowl; December 17; Canton, Ohio
Mary Hardin–Baylor	57
North Central (IL)	24

== Coaching changes ==
This list includes all head coaching changes announced during or after the season.

School	Outgoing coach	Date	Reason	Replacement	Previous position
Carnegie Mellon	Rich Lackner	Before November 2022 (effective at season end)	Retired	Ryan Larsen	Columbia quarterbacks coach (2019–2021)
Christopher Newport	Art Link	November 7, 2021	Fired	Paul Crowley	Christopher Newport offensive line coach (2019–2021)
Merchant Marine	Mike Toop	November 10, 2021	Retired	Jameson Croall	Merchant Marine offensive coordinator and offensive line coach (2012–2021)
Luther	Caleb Padilla	November 15, 2021	Fired	Joe Troche	St. Olaf special teams coordinator and defensive backs coach (2019–2021)
Wittenberg	Joe Fincham	November 18, 2021	Retired	Jim Collins	Dayton offensive coordinator and quarterbacks coach (2020–2021)
Wisconsin–Platteville	Mike Mendorfer	November 22, 2021	Retired	Ryan Munz	Wisconsin–Platteville offensive coordinator (2007–2021)
Dean	Steve Tirrell	November 23, 2021	Resigned	Andrae Murphy	Columbia defensive backs coach (2018–2021)
Millikin	Dan Gritti	November 29, 2021	Resigned	Carlton Hall	Millikin defensive coordinator (2020–2021)
Wisconsin–Oshkosh	Pat Cerroni	November 30, 2021	Retired	Peter Jennings	Wisconsin–Whitewater offensive coordinator and quarterbacks coach (2018–2021)
Sul Ross	John Pearce	December 1, 2021	Resigned	Barry Derickson	Sul Ross offensive coordinator (2021)
Kenyon	James Rosenbury	December 3, 2021	Resigned	Ian Good	Kenyon defensive coordinator and linebackers coach (2019–2021)
Waynesburg	Chris Smithley	December 7, 2021	Moved to administrative position	Cornelius Coleman	Duquesne defensive line coach (2020–2021)
Rockford	J. T. Zimmerman	December 9, 2021	Resigned	Calvin Toliver	Rockford offensive coordinator (2021)
Franklin & Marshall	John Troxell	December 14, 2021	Hired as head coach for Lafayette	Tom Blumenauer	Williams offensive coordinator and quarterbacks coach (2021)
Wisconsin–Stevens Point	Greg Breitbach	December 30, 2021	Resigned	Luke Venne	Wisconsin–Oshkosh offensive coordinator (2017–2021)
Albright	John Marzka	December 2021	Resigned	Isaac Collins	Bucknell defensive coordinator and defensive backs coach (2021)
Thiel	Mike Winslow	December 2021	Fired	Sam Bauman	Wooster defensive coordinator and linebackers coach (2015–2021)
Mary Hardin–Baylor	Pete Fredenburg	January 7, 2022	Retired	Larry Harmon	Mary Hardin–Baylor defensive coordinator (2002–2021)
Idaho State	Christian Ozolins (interim head coach)	January 21, 2022	Permanent replacement hired	Lazarus Morgan	Cortland defensive coordinator and safeties coach (2020–2021)
Ithaca	Dan Swanstrom	January 24, 2022	Hired as offensive coordinator and quarterbacks coach for Penn	Michael Toerper	Holy Cross safeties coach (2020–2021)
Chicago	Chris Wilkerson	January 25, 2022	Hired as head coach by Eastern Illinois	Todd Gilcrist Jr.	Holy Cross wide receivers coach (2019–2021)
North Central (IL)	Jeff Thorne	January 26, 2022	Hired as offensive coordinator and quarterbacks coach for Western Michigan	Brad Spencer	North Central (IL) offensive coordinator (2015–2021)
FDU–Florham	Jimmy Robertson	January 27, 2022	Hired as quarterbacks coach for Monmouth	Anthony Van Curen	FDU–Florham defensive coordinator (2019–2021)
Bethany (WV)	Bill Garvey	January 28, 2022	Fired	Brandon Robinson	Baldwin Wallace offensive coordinator and quarterbacks coach (2020–2021)
Anna Maria	Dan Mulrooney	January 31, 2022	Hired as the head coach for Lock Haven	Steve Croce	Anna Maria offensive coordinator and running backs coach (2019–2021)
Alvernia	Ralph Clark	Before January 2022	Fired	Steve Azzanesi	Delaware State offensive coordinator and quarterbacks coach (2020–2021)
Lewis & Clark	Jay Locey	February 4, 2022	Retired	Joe Bushman	Lewis & Clark offensive coordinator (2019–2021)
Bates	Ed Argast (interim)	February 8, 2022	Permanent replacement hired	Matt Coyne	Wesleyan defensive coordinator, special teams coordinator, and linebackers coach (2021)
John Carroll	Rick Finotti	March 14, 2022	Resigned	Drew Nystrom (full season interim)	John Carroll offensive coordinator and offensive line coach (2020–2021)
Macalester	KiJuan Ware (interim)	March 18, 2022	Permanent replacement hired	Phil Nicolaides	Randolph–Macon defensive coordinator (2016–2021)
Martin Luther	Mark Stein	Before April 25, 2022	Hired as athletic director for Fox Valley Lutheran HS (WI)	Paul Huebner	Shoreland Lutheran HS (WI) head coach (2011–2021)
Curry	Skip Bandini	Before April 2022	Retired	Todd Parsons	Endicott assistant head coach and offensive coordinator (2020–2021)
William Paterson	Dustin Johnson	Before May 2022	Hired as cornerbacks coach for Villanova	Shaun Williams	William Paterson defensive coordinator and safeties coach (2013–2021)

== See also ==
- 2021 NCAA Division I FBS football season
- 2021 NCAA Division I FCS football season
- 2021 NCAA Division II football season
- 2021 NAIA football season
- 2021 U Sports football season
