= Red Eye Louie's Vodquila =

Blend of vodka and tequila

Vodquila
- Type: Blended liquor
- Manufacturer: Red Eye Louie's
- Origin: USA
- Introduced: 2011
- Alcohol by volume: 40%
- Proof (US): 80
- Colour: Clear
- Ingredients: Vodka, Tequila
- Website: www.vodquila.com

Red Eye Louie's Vodquila is a blend of vodka and tequila, which is produced by Red Eye Louie's. The primary ingredients include vodka, 6 times distilled and made from multiple grains and tequila made from the agave plant. It is bottled at 40% alcohol by volume. (80 Proof)

The three co-founders, Chander, Nina, and Romie Arora created the product in 2011. Headquartered in Alabama, with offices in New York as well, Red Eye Louie's Vodquila is available in 30 states in the United States as well as the UK, Spain, Portugal, Australia, Egypt, and Alberta, as of March 2017.

== History ==
Vodquila was originally created in 2011 when co-founder Nina Arora had where she needed to come up with a new marketable product. She created the initial product at home, and tested it first with her father and brother. The three decided they had a marketable product and further developed the recipe and packaging.

The name "Red Eye Louie's Vodquila" came about when the Alcohol and Tobacco Tax and Trade Bureau rejected their initial proposal of marketing the product under the simple name "Vodquila", claiming that the family had created an entirely new product category (vodquila) and therefore needed a more specific brand name for their product.

== Product information ==
Red Eye Louie's Vodquila is currently available in the following sizes:

- 700ml glass / 6 pack
- 750ml glass/ 6 pack
- 750ml glass/ 12 pack
- 375ml glass/ 24 pack
- 50ml plastic/ 60 pack
- 50ml glass / 50 pack

1 liter size bottles were released in the second quarter of 2016.

== Awards ==
Year	Event	Award
2013	WSWA Convention	Silver medal
2013	SIP Awards	Silver medal
2014	WSWA Convention	Gold medal
2014	IWSC (UK)	Silver medal
2014	IWSC (Hong Kong)	Silver medal
2015	San Francisco World Spirit	Bronze medal

== Sources ==
- Glass, Jeremy (24 February 2014). "We tasted Vodquila and lived to tell the tale". Super Compressor.
- Sedgwick, Lauren (21 August 2014). "'Vodquila', a blend of tequila and vodka, to hit the market". The Telegraph.
- Lynch, Alison (19 August 2014). "New spirit hybrid Vodquila combines vodka and tequila to give 2 hangovers for the price of 1". The Metro.
- Hull, Christopher (1 January 2014). "Review: Red Eye Louie's Vodquila". Drink Hacker.
- Peters, Lucia (8 August 2014). "Review: Red Eye Louie's Vodquila Combines All the Best and Worst Attributes of Vodka and Tequila in One Bottle". Bustle.
- "Vodquila Gets Attention From Prestigious Competition". NPR.
- Wisenthal, Marianne. "Coming soon to a bar near you: Vodquila". The Loop.
- Calhoun, Jennifer. "Alabama family gains national attention with Vodquila". Dothan Eagle.
- Pimpernel, Claret. "Vodquila, A vodka tequila blend". Harpers. Archived from the original on 27 June 2015.
