= Skip Bandini =

American football coach

Playing career
- 1977–1980: Massachusetts Maritime
- Position: Offensive lineman

Coaching career (HC unless noted)
- 1981–1982: Massachusetts Maritime (assistant OL)
- 1989–1990: Saint Clement HS (MA)
- 1992–1995: Don Bosco Tech HS (MA)
- 1996–1998: MIT (OC)
- 1999: Mount Ida (DC)
- 2000–2002: UMass Lowell (OL/DL)
- 2003–2004: Curry (DC)
- 2005: Curry (OC)
- 2006–2021: Curry

Head coaching record
- Overall: 88–68 (college)
- Bowls: 1–0
- Tournaments: 2–3 (NCAA D-III playoffs)

Accomplishments and honors

Championships
- 2 NEFC (2006–2007); 3 NEFC Boyd Division (2006–2007, 2009)

Skip Bandini is an American former football coach. He served as the head football coach at Curry College in Milton, Massachusetts from 2006 to 2021. Bandini was the defensive coordinator and then offensive coordinator at Curry under Steve Nelson before succeeding him as head coach.

In 1992, Bandini was appointed head football coach at Don Bosco Technical High School in Boston.

== Head coaching record ==
Year	Team	Overall	Conference	Standing	Bowl/playoffs	D3^{#}
Curry Colonels (New England Football Conference / Commonwealth Coast Football) (2006–2021)
2006	Curry	11–1	7–0	1st (Boyd)	L NCAA Division III First Round	
2007	Curry	12–1	7–0	1st (Boyd)	L NCAA Division III Second Round	23
2008	Curry	10–2	6–1	2nd (Boyd)	L NCAA Division III Second Round	22
2009	Curry	8–3	7–0	1st (Boyd)		
2010	Curry	6–4	4–3	T–4th (Boyd)		
2011	Curry	5–5	3–4	5th (Boyd)		
2012	Curry	6–4	5–2	3rd (Boyd)		
2013	Curry	4–5	4–3	T–3rd		
2014	Curry	3–7	3–4	5th		
2015	Curry	4–6	1–6	7th		
2016	Curry	3–6	1–6	7th		
2017	Curry	8–3	4–1	2nd	W New England	
2018	Curry	3–7	1–5	T–5th		
2019	Curry	2–8	2–5	T–6th		
2020–21	No team—COVID-19					
2021	Curry	3–6	1–5	6th		
Curry:		88–68	56–45			
Total:		88–68				
National championship Conference title Conference division title or championship game berth
^{#}Rankings from D3football.com.
