= Chakana wines =

Chakana Wines
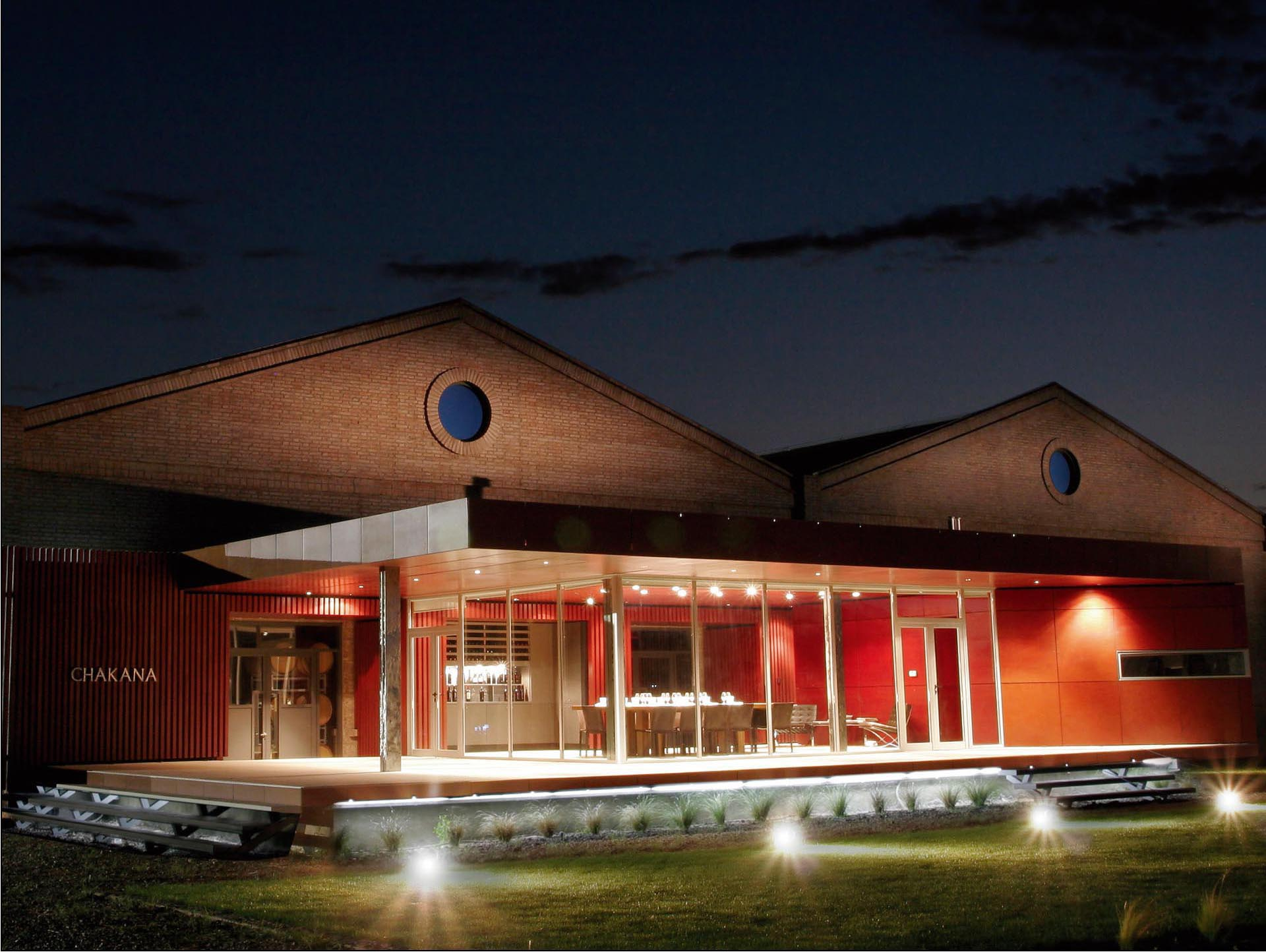
- Company type: Winery
- Founded: May 2, 2002
- Founder: Juan Pelizzatti
- Headquarters: Argentina
- Area served: United States, Europe, Argentina
- Website: http://www.chakanawines.com.ar/

Chakana Winery was founded on May 2, 2002, in Agrelo, Lujan de Cuyo, Mendoza, Argentina, by Juan Pelizzatti. Chakana is a family-owned winery located 960 meters (3,149 feet) above sea level in the Andes Mountains' foothills.

The wines come in three different ranges: Maipe (fresh fruit-forward wines for everyday consumption), Maipe Reserve (complex, barrel-aged varietal wines), and Chakana Estate. In 2011, Chakana won one of the three gold medals: best-in-class awards from the International Wine and Spirit Competition (IWSC) for its Chakana Reserve Malbec 2010. This allowed the winery to compete for the Argentinean Producer of the Year Trophy, which took place on November 16 in London.

== History ==
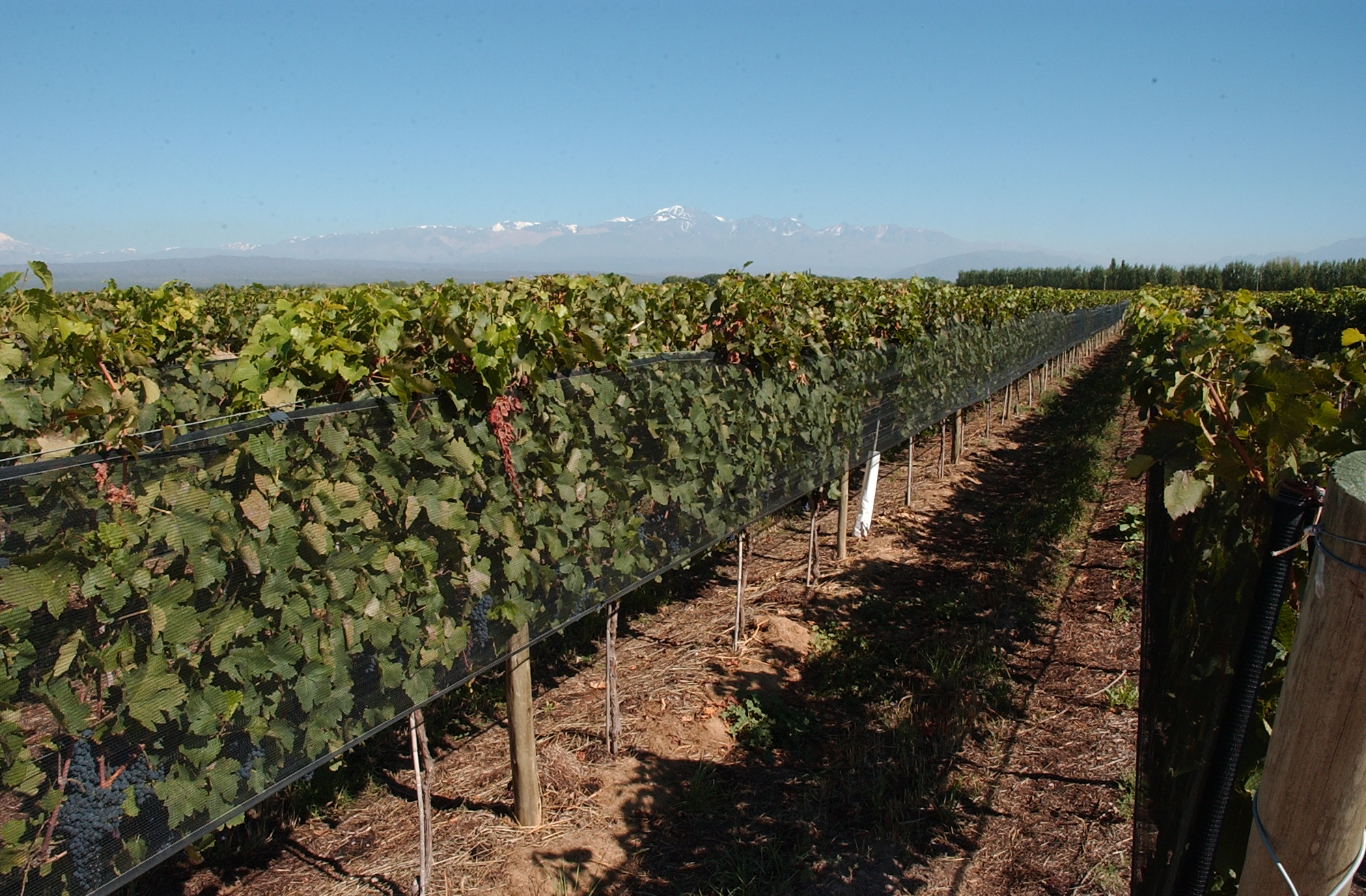

Chakana, the company, was founded on May 2, 2002. As of 2011, the Agrelo winery had a 2-million-liter capacity. It was created with small tanks in order to preserve the character of each soil parcel. Chakana began exporting in 2004, eventually growing to 1.5 million bottles in 2011 to more than 25 nations.

In October 2009, a local fund took shares in the company.

== Location ==
Chakana wines are made from grapes grown on a 150-ha estate in Lujan de Cuyo, at 960 m above sea level.

The winery in Agrelo has a 2-million-liter capacity. Small tanks are used to maintain the identity of each soil parcel.

== Vineyards and soils ==
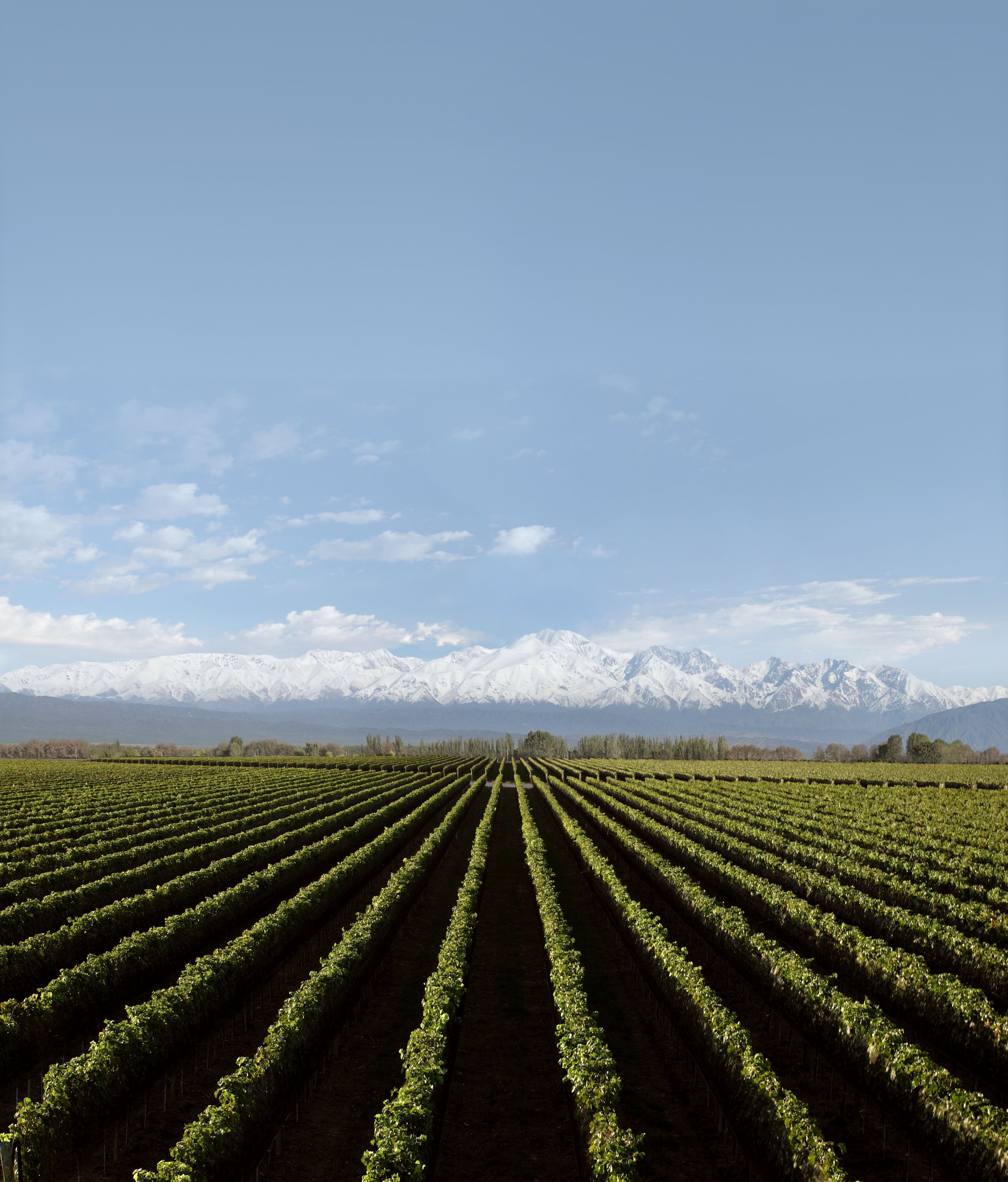

Chakana vineyards are orientated 45 degrees northwest to maximize fruit expression. This also is a surprising example of synchronicity, as this is the exact route that the Andean development chose.

This line was named by the Andean natives as the Viracocha line or the line of the truth of the Incas. Following this line, all main Inca centers can be found, from the origins on the Titicaca lake and Tiwanaku to Cuzco. The planting direction in Chakana was chosen to avoid sunburn of the grapes during peak temperature hours, as the canopy shades the bunches.

Soils: Chakana prefers alluvial soil of clay loam to sandy loam texture, with round stones at the bottom between 50 and 100 cm and excellent drainage. The best parcels in Agrelo, Mayor Drummond and Altamira feature these conditions that offer round tannins, fantastic structure and full ripeness.

Climate: Lujan de Cuyo and Uco Valley offer all year round dry conditions with extreme thermal amplitude that promote aromatic compounds in wines.

Irrigation: Drip irrigation is used in all Chakana vineyards as a way to control the growing cycle and make a rational use of water. Winery effluents are neutralized and reused in vineyard irrigation with no impact to the environment.

== Terroir concept ==
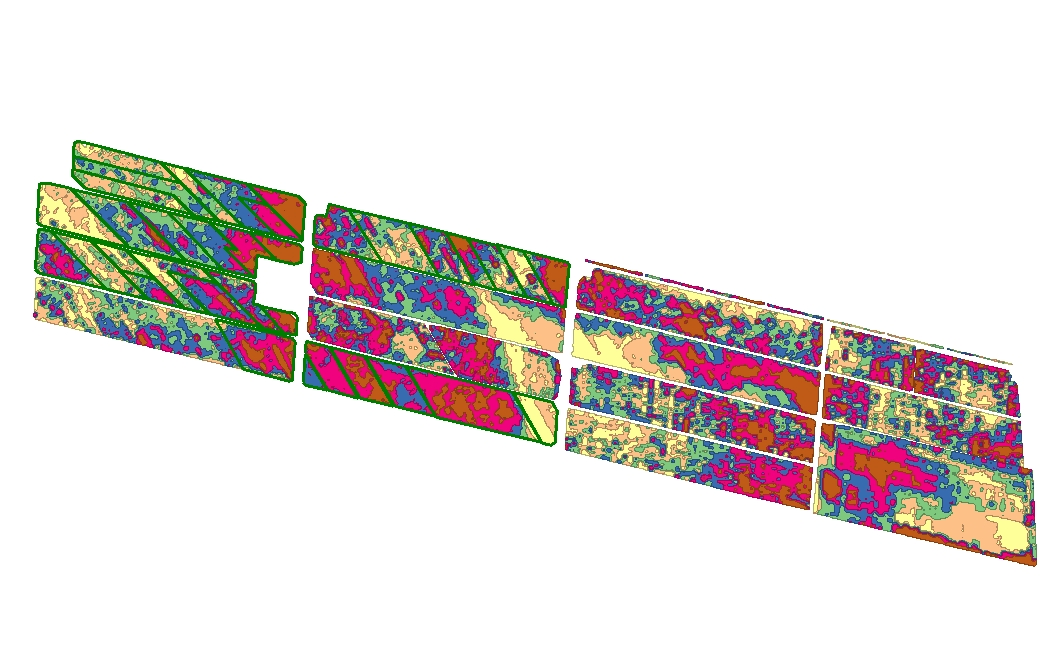

Chakana wines uses terroir concept methodology managed by Chilean terroir expert Pedro Parra. Pedro has been involved with wineries in Chile, California, Tuscany and Argentina to help them identify terroirs of superior potential.
