= KDAN =

KDAN may refer to:

- KDAN (FM), a radio station (91.5 FM) licensed to serve Marshall, California, United States
- Danville Regional Airport (ICAO code KDAN)
