= Kennard Winchester =

American basketball player

Personal information
- Born: September 3, 1966 (age 59) Chestertown, Maryland, U.S.
- Listed height: 6 ft 5 in (1.96 m)
- Listed weight: 210 lb (95 kg)

Career information
- High school: Queen Anne's County (Centreville, Maryland)
- College: James Madison (1984–1988); Averett (1988–1989)
- NBA draft: 1989: undrafted
- Playing career: 1989–1996
- Position: Small forward / shooting guard
- Number: 20, 7

Career history
- 1989–1990: Atenas de Cordoba
- 1990–1991: Houston Rockets
- 1991–1992: New York Knicks
- 1992–1993: Houston Rockets
- 1993–1994: Rapid City Thrillers
- 1994: Columbus Horizon
- 1994–1995: Olimpia de Venado Tuerto
- 1995–1996: Le Mans Sarthe
- 1996: Carolina Cardinals
- 1996: Treasure Coast Tropics

Career highlights
- All-CAA (1988)
- Stats at NBA.com
- Stats at Basketball Reference

Kennard Norman Winchester Jr. (born September 3, 1966) is an American former professional basketball player. He was a 6-foot-5-inch (1.96 m) 210 pounds (95 kg) swingman born in Chestertown, Maryland and played college basketball for the James Madison Dukes and Averett Cougars.

Winchester started his collegiate career at James Madison University and averaged 3.3 points per game during the 1984–85 season. He missed the 1985–86 season but improved to 13.6 points per game when he returned in 1986–87. Winchester was selected as the team's most valuable player during the 1987–88 season when he averaged 16.1 points per game. He was suspended by the team after he was arrested for shoplifting cable connection accessories for a video cassette recorder. He transferred to Averett University in NCAA Division III where he averaged 20.2 points per game during the 1988–89 season.

Winchester played 107 games for the NBA's Houston Rockets from 1990–93. He also played briefly for the New York Knicks in 1991–92.

Kennard Winchester is the men's Varsity Basketball Coach at East Chapel Hill High School as of May 2023.
