= Women's Forum for the Economy & Society =

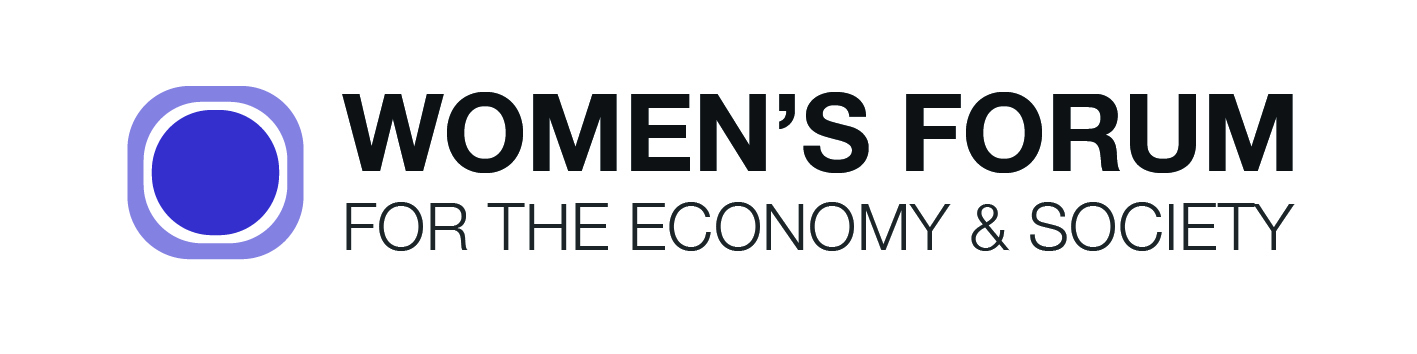
Women's Forum corporate logo

The Women's Forum for Economy & Society is a platform that highlights women's voices and perspectives on pressing global issues ranging from sustainable development and economics to culture and media. Headquartered in Paris, the Women's Forum for the Economy & Society promotes women's leadership and progress throughout the year with initiatives in partnership with businesses, cultural leaders, media leaders, and non-governmental organizations.

== History ==
The Women's Forum for the Economy & Society was established in 2005 by Aude de Thuin with the support of a group of influential French women, including Véronique Morali, Anne Lauvergeon, Laurence Parisot and Dominique Hériad Dubreuil. Publicis Groupe has been a major stakeholder in the Women's Forum since September 2009.

In 2014, Jacqueline Franjou was confirmed as the CEO of the Women's Forum. Clara Gaymard held the position of president from 2014 to 2018. In January 2017, Chiara Corazza was named the managing director, having previously been the managing director of the Greater Paris Investment Agency (GPIA), among other prestigious roles. She successfully led the Women;s Forum for five years. Dame Kristin Scott Thomas was named as the honorary president of the Women's Forum in 2019. In 2018, Anne-Gabrielle Heilbronner became the president.

In April 2021, Audrey Tcherkoff was appointed managing director of the Women's Forum, a position that she held for a year. Today, the Women's Forum is managed by Anne-Gabrielle Heilbronner as president and Isabelle Gélinet-Vidal as Managing Director.

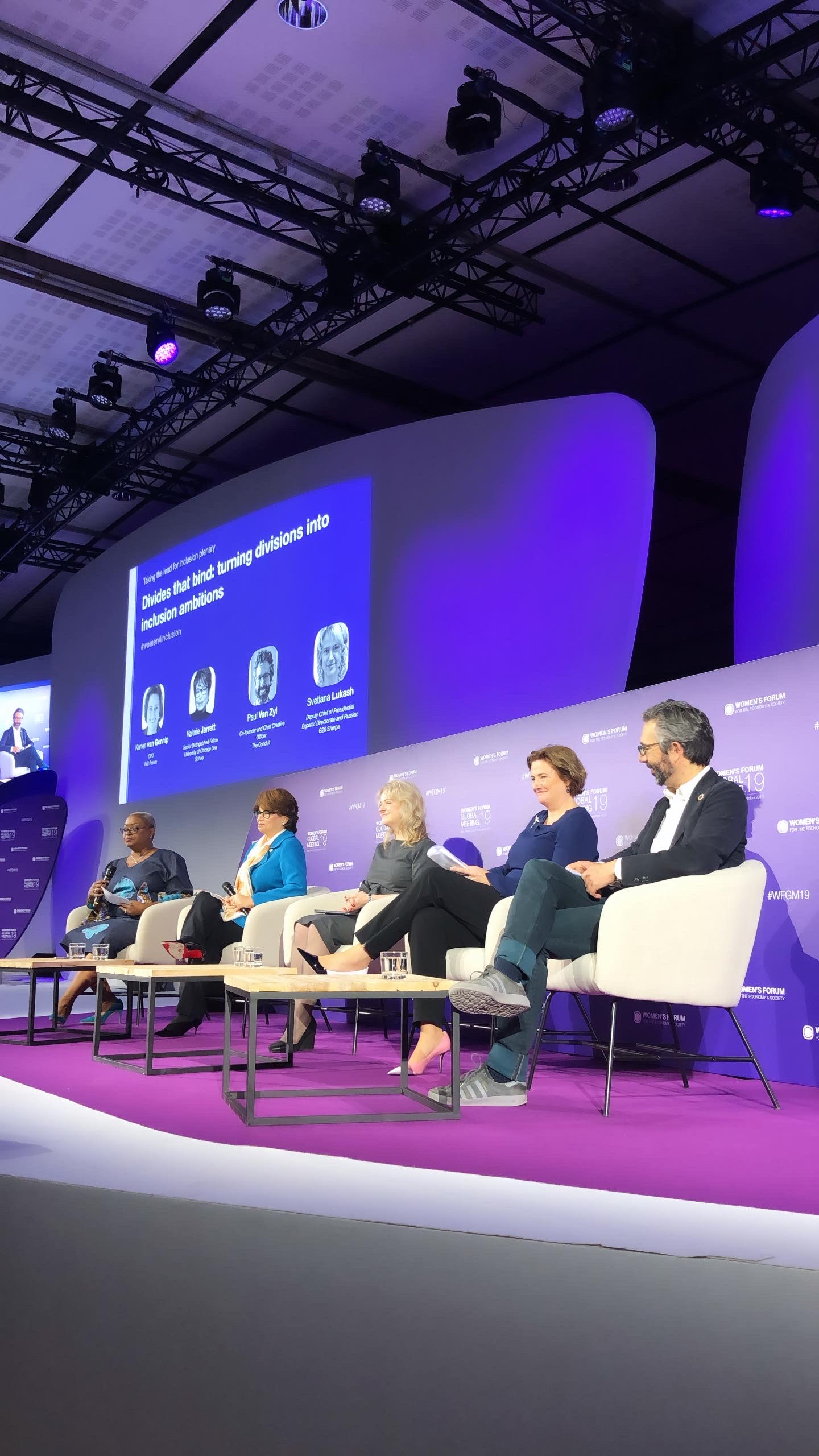
Women's Forum Global Meeting in Paris

== Meetings ==
Over the years, the Women's Forum has convened over 60,000 delegates from over 158 nationalities at its various international Meetings. Sectors represented include:

| Industries (energy, healthcare, retail...) | 30% |
| Entertainment and media | 15% |
| Finance | 25% |
| Public sector, non-profit & governments | 20% |
| Other | 10% |

=== Previous Global Meetings ===
The flagship Women's Forum Global Meeting moved to Paris from Deauville, France, in 2017. Every year, the Global Meeting brings together over 2,500 delegates from 90 countries and builds on the success of Women's Forum Meetings with a regional focus.

The 2019 Women's Forum Global Meeting featured special delegations from around the globe, youth delegations, CEO Champions, the 2019 batch of Rising Talents, and more on the pillars of shifting mindsets, reimagining organizations, and putting technology to work to "Taking the lead for inclusion: Accelerating impact."

=== Previous Regional Meetings ===
Along with the successes of the Women's Forum Brazil in 2012, 2013, and 2014, the international expansion of the Women's Forum gathered steam with successive meetings in Myanmar in 2013 and 2014. The Women's Forum Italy, which took place during Expo Milano 2015, focused on issues surrounding food and nutrition from the perspective of gender. In 2016, Global Women's Forum Dubai examined the achievements of women in the Arab world. The inaugural edition of Women's Forum Mexico highlighted what women and men in Mexico can do to "co-create together". The Women's Forum Mauritius explored climate change from the perspective of African countries and Small Island Developing States.

Under the leadership of the new CEO Chiara Corazza in 2017, the Women's Forum Rome (26–27 June) focused on revitalizing Europe with women's energy for peace and prosperity launching a manifesto for climate change, while the Women's Forum Global Meeting convened for the first time in Paris (5–6 October) on the theme "Engage for Impact! Daring to lead in a disrupted world". The second edition of Women's Forum Mexico (8–9 November) was dedicated to the unsung heroes who demonstrated incredible civic engagement during the earthquakes.

In 2018, Women's Forum in Toronto Canada (10–11 May) generated concrete ideas to inform and influence the agenda of the G7 Summit for inclusive progress. The Manifesto focused on security, women in the workforce, access to education and technology, realigning public and private policy, and more. First Women's Forum Singapore (12–14 September) fostered women's leadership for social progress and economic impact in Singapore and ASEAN in the France–Singapore Year of Innovation.

== Partners ==
=== Strategic Committee ===
Strategic Partners include AXA, Bayer, BNP Paribas, and Publicis Groupe.

=== Global partners ===
Global partners of the Women's Forum include Accenture, Bouygues, Johnson & Johnson and Lenovo.

=== Editorial partners ===
Décisions Durables, LinkedIn, The New York Times, and The Wall Street Journal are the editorial partners of the Women's Forum.

== Initiatives ==
The Women's Forum has initiated a range of initiatives to support women around the globe.

=== Daring Circles ===
Daring Circles are workgroups that build on existing research compiled by the Women's Forum. They draw on the collaborative expertise of its partners to reveal innovative views and insights, and generate positive societal and economic outcomes.

Each program consists of a combination of strategic members, global partners, knowledge partners sourcing content, and institutional partners with relevant policy influence and expertise. The Daring Circles aim to generate evidence-based insights and drive tangible action among members and beyond.

The Women's Forum launched Daring Circles five key areas:

==== Women & Climate ====
- Led by AXA, which addresses gender gaps, and ensures women lead in health technology.

==== Women & AI ====
- Led by BNP Paribas and L'Oréal, which enables women to lead actions against climate change, and addresses its disproportionate impact on women.

=== Women & STEM ===
- Led by Microsoft, which inspires organizations to apply a gender-lens to their AI development and implementation.

==== Women & Access to Health ====
- Led by Google, which promotes the increase in representation, leadership, and impact of women with STEM skills.

==== Women & Business ====
- Led by P&G, which raises awareness of the power of procurement for women's economic empowerment, and promotes women-owned businesses.

==== The report "Women at the Heart of the Economy" ====
After the G7 hosted and chaired by France in Biarritz in August 2019, Ms. Chiara Corazza, managing director of the Women's Forum, was commissioned by Ms. Marlène Schiappa, French Government Minister of State for Gender Equality and the Fight against Discrimination, and by Mr. Cédric O, French Government Minister of State for the Digital Sector, to provide critical policy proposals and a national action plan to foster the attractiveness of STEM skills for girls and women throughout their lives.

Thanks to the support from the partners of the Women's Forum, Corazza proposed 27 recommendations, outlined in the report "Women at the Heart of the Economy" and designed to enable women to be where they can have a positive and decisive social and economic impact in order to bring their added value to a rapidly changing world.

These proposals will contribute to the law for women's economic empowerment that the French Government is submitting in 2020.

== Rising Talents ==
The Rising Talents program aims to distinguish highly talented young women who will become influential figures in our economies and societies in the future. In partnership with Eurazeo, Spencer Stuart and Lazard, the initiative is an example of the values championed by the Women's Forum since its creation. The Rising Talents network includes more than 100 members and offers networking opportunities year-round. Having celebrated its 10th anniversary in 2017, this initiative brings the vision of these change-makers to the Women's Forum. Each year, some 15 young women join the Rising Talents network and attend the Women's Forum Global Meeting and regional Women's Forum meetings, benefiting from enhanced networking activities during these events and in the future.

== CEO Champions ==
CEO Champions is an initiative launched in 2010 by the Women's Forum, designed to drive progress and accountability for women's advancement in the private and public sectors. In partnership with McKinsey & Company, the peer-to-peer network presents an opportunity for CEOs to underscore their organization's commitment to women's advancement as well as take a strong leadership role in the broader global economy and society. CEO Champions members are participants who track and drive measurable progress for women's advancement through on-record mutual commitments and accountability. Now in its ninth year, the CEO Champions Initiative is a pioneer as a high-level international platform that advocates for the inclusion of both men and women at leadership level in the private as well as the public sector. In 2018, the Women's Forum gathered over 150 CEOs at CEO Champions workshops, organized in partnership with McKinsey & Company, in Canada, Singapore, and France.
