= Phil Kleckler =

American football coach (born c. 1984)

Phil Klecker
Current position
- Title: Head coach
- Team: Lindsey Wilson
- Conference: MSC
- Record: 32–11

Biographical details
- Born: c. 1984 (age 41–42); Rockton, Illinois, U.S.
- Education: Monmouth College (2006); Averett University (2009)

Playing career
- 2003–2006: Monmouth (IL)

Coaching career (HC unless noted)
- 2007–2008: Averett (LB)
- 2009–2010: Occidental (DL)
- 2011–2014: Benedictine (IL) (LB)
- 2015–2016: Benedictine (IL) (DC)
- 2017–2021: Lindsey Wilson (DC)
- 2022–present: Lindsey Wilson

Head coaching record
- Overall: 32–11
- Tournaments: 2–2 (NAIA playoffs)

Accomplishments and honors

Championships
- 2011, 2015, 2017, 2019, 2020, 2021, 2025

Awards
- 2018 NAIA Assistant Coach of the Year 2020 Footballscoop Cordinator of the Year 2025 MSC Coach of the Year

Phil Klecker (born c. 1984) is an American college football coach. He is the head football coach for Lindsey Wilson University, a position he has held since 2022. He also coached for Averett, Occidental, and Benedictine (IL). He played college football for Monmouth (Illinois).

== Head coaching record ==
Year	Team	Overall	Conference	Standing	Bowl/playoffs	NAIA Coaches'^{#}
Lindsey Wilson Blue Raiders (Mid-South Conference) (2022–present)
2022	Lindsey Wilson	10–2	7–1	2nd	L NAIA Quarterfinals	8
2023	Lindsey Wilson	7–3	4–2	3rd		19
2024	Lindsey Wilson	5–4	3–3	3rd		
2025	Lindsey Wilson	10–2	5–1	1st	L NAIA Quarterfinals	7
2026	Lindsey Wilson	0–0	0–0			
Lindsey Wilson:		32–11	19–7			
Total:		32–11				
