= Averett University =

Baptist college in Danville, Virginia, US

Coordinates: 36°34′43.9″N 79°24′44.1″W

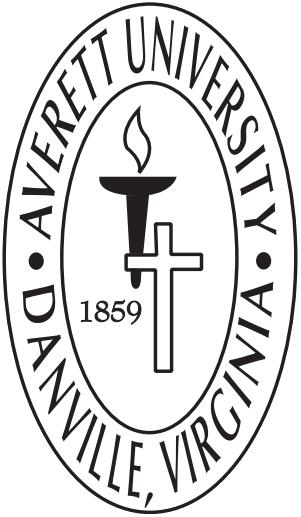
- Other name: AU
- Former names: Union Female College (1859–1917); Averett College (1917–2001)
- Motto: Latin: Irreparabile Tempus
- Motto in English: Irreparable Time
- Type: Private university
- Established: 1859; 167 years ago
- Religious affiliation: Baptist
- Endowment: $21.3 million (2019)
- President: Tatia Daniels Granger
- Faculty: 270
- Students: 1879
- Undergraduates: 870
- Postgraduates: 1000
- Location: Danville, Virginia, US
- Campus: Suburban
- Colors: Blue and Gold
- Nickname: Cougars
- Sporting affiliations: NCAA Division III – ODAC
- Mascots: Ave and Rett
- Website: averett.edu

Averett University (AU) is a private university in Danville, Virginia, United States. Founded in 1859 as a women's college, Averett became a coeducational institution in 1969. In 2011, the university restored its Baptist affiliation, renewing a relationship that had existed from Averett's founding until 2005.

== History ==
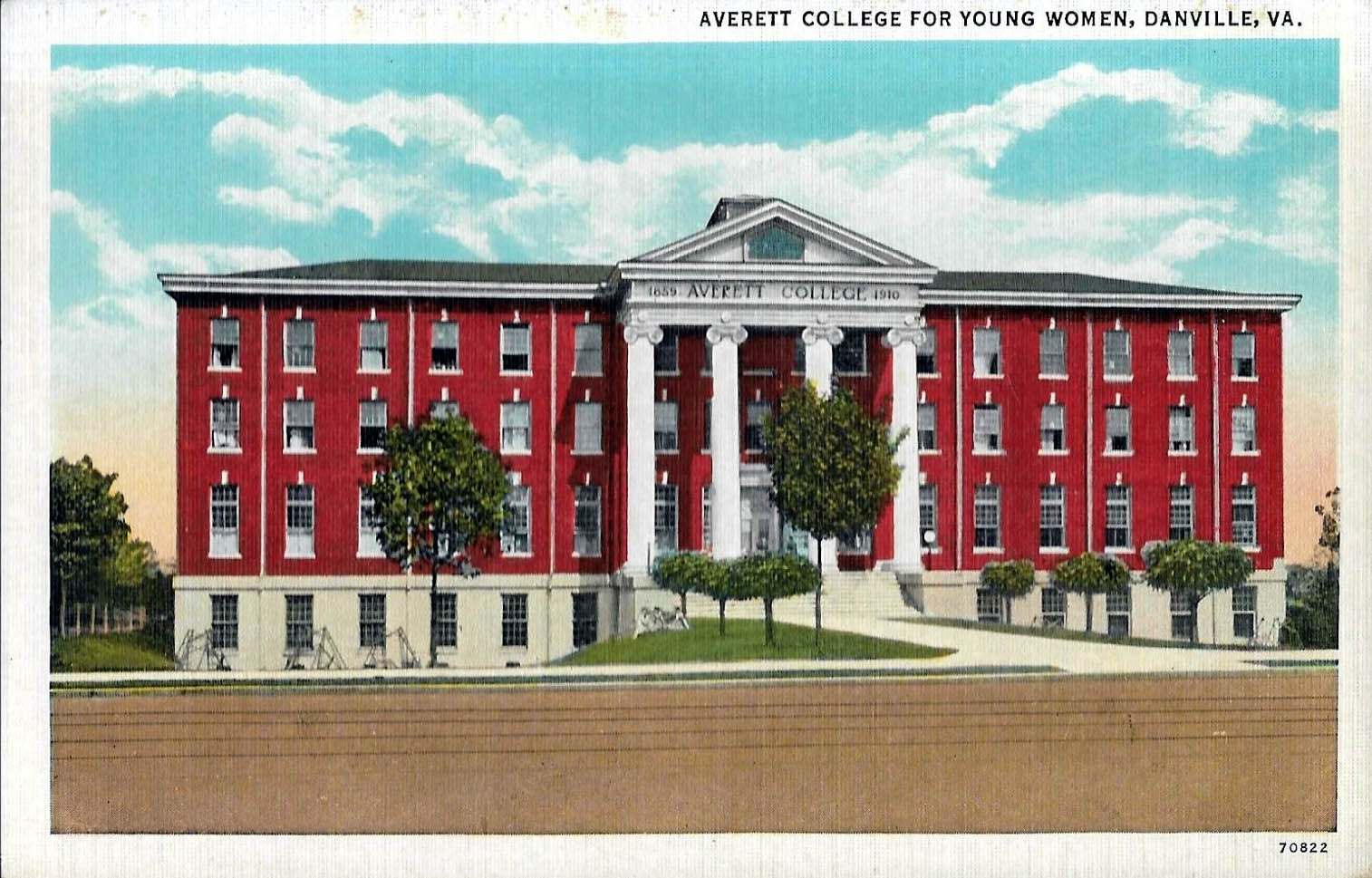
Averett College building depicted on an old postcard

The school was chartered in 1859 as "Union Female College" and became affiliated with the Baptist General Association of Virginia in 1910. The school's name was changed to "Averett College" and received accreditation as a junior college in 1917. Accreditation by the Southern Association of Colleges and Schools followed in 1928. Averett became a coeducational four-year college in 1969 and offered its first graduate programs in the 1980s. The school changed its name to Averett University in 2001.

In 2005, the Baptist General Association of Virginia dissolved their ties with Averett after the university abandoned Baptist positions on homosexuality. In November 2011, the Baptist General Association of Virginia voted to restore the association's relationship with Averett University.

== Academics ==
Averett University offers associate and bachelor's degree programs in approximately 15 majors. There are also two master's degree programs available: a Master of Education degree and a Master of Business Administration degree. The student-to-faculty ratio is 12:1.

=== Undergraduate admissions ===
In 2023, the university accepted 76% of applicants to undergraduate programs, with those admitted having an average 3.07 GPA. Averett University is standardized test optional and applicants do not have to submit either SAT or ACT scores. Of applicants, only 3–4% submitted scores.

=== Flight school ===
Averett University has a Bachelor of Science in Aerospace Management degree with two concentration options: Aviation Business and Flight Operations. Also available is a joint Aerospace Management/Criminal Justice bachelor's degree. The university has a FAA-approved Part 141 Pilot School with flight operations conducted out of the Danville Regional Airport (KDAN) that is close to campus.

== Rankings ==
For 2027, U.S. News & World Report ranked Averett University tied for No.94 out of 135 Regional Universities South, No.28 in Best Value Schools, No.45 in Top Performers on Social Mobility, and tied for No. 648 in Nursing.

== Campus ==
Averett's main campus is a 19-acre (77,000 m^{2}) campus on West Main Street in Danville. The 70-acre (280,000 m^{2}) North Campus Athletic Center and Averett Flight Center at Danville Regional Airport are also in Danville. The 100-acre (0.40 km^{2}) Equestrian Center in Pelham, North Carolina, lies just across the Virginia–North Carolina border.

== Student life ==
=== Averett Student Foundation ===
Averett Student Foundation members represent the university at special functions such as plays, receptions and donor recognition events.

=== The Chanticleer ===
Averett's student-run news magazine, The Chanticleer, was established in 1922.

=== Student Government Association ===
The Student Government Association (SGA) is Averett's student governing body.

== Athletics ==
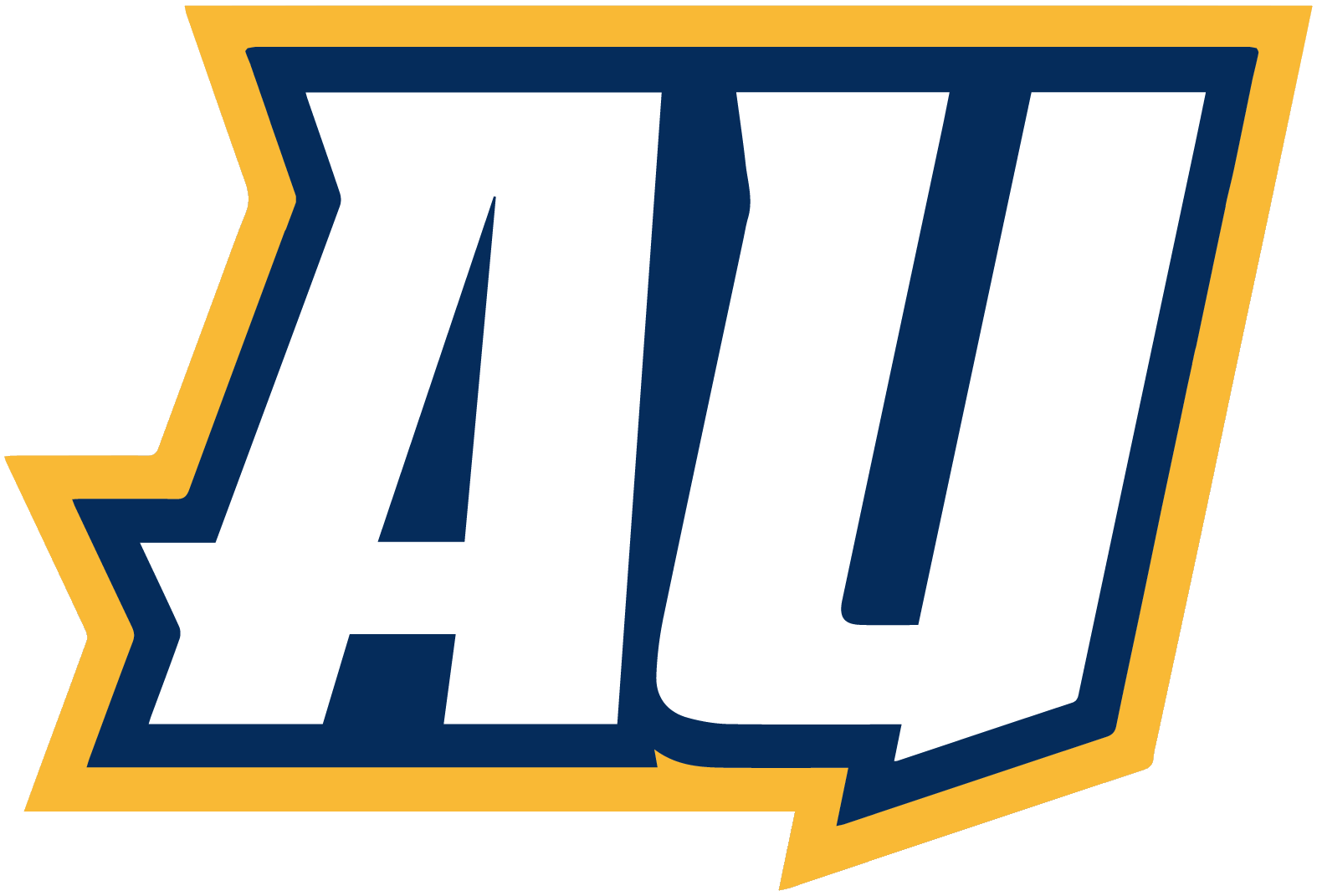
Averett athletics monogram

Averett competes in 23 intercollegiate varsity sports, and its athletic teams are called the Cougars. The university is a member of the Division III of the National Collegiate Athletic Association (NCAA), primarily competing in the Old Dominion Athletic Conference (ODAC) since the 2022–23 academic year. The Cougars previously competed in the USA South Athletic Conference (USA South) from 1978–79 to 2021–22.

=== List of teams ===
Men's sports	Women's sports
Baseball	Basketball
Basketball	Cross country
Cross country	Equestrian
Equestrian (non-NCAA)	Golf
Football	
Golf	Soccer
Lacrosse	Softball
Soccer	Tennis
	Track and field
Track and field	Volleyball
Volleyball	
Wrestling	

=== Facilities ===
Averett's athletics facilities are located on the E. Stuart James Grant North Campus in Danville. Football, lacrosse and soccer competitions are played on Daly Field at Frank R. Campbell Stadium, which was previously known as the "Cougar Den" Redevelopment of the facility began in 2014 with new turf and lights for the existing stadium, and the field was renamed "Daly Field". Further development of the stadium complex followed, with it being named "Frank R. Campbell Stadium" once the press box and home stands were built.

Basketball, volleyball and wrestling competitions are held in the E. Stuart James Grant Center on North Campus. The baseball stadium, Owen-Fulton Field, and softball stadium, Cougar Field, are also located on the North Campus.

== Notable alumni ==
- Rossie D. Alston Jr., attorney and judge
- Alexander Assefa, politician
- Phil Berger, politician
- Ken Boyd, politician
- James E. Edmunds, politician
- Skye Gunn, soccer player
- Greg Harbaugh Jr., football coach
- Jeff Hughley, football player
- Phil Kleckler, football coach
- Anton Matinlauri, soccer coach
- Donald Merricks, politician
- Todd Parsons, football coach
- Gregory L. Robinson, engineer
- Ginnie Sebastian Storage, 47th President General of the Daughters of the American Revolution
- Katherine Waddell, politician
- Kennard Winchester, basketball player
- Jeff Yoo, soccer player
