= Calvin Toliver =

American football coach

Current position
- Title: Head coach
- Team: Rockford
- Conference: NACC
- Record: 8–32

Playing career
- 2007–2009: Delaware State
- 2011: Wenatchee Valley Venom
- Positions: Quarterback, H-back, wide receiver

Coaching career (HC unless noted)
- 2014: Valley Forge Military (PA) (WR/DB)
- 2015: Delaware Valley (QB)
- 2016: Cheyney (WR)
- 2017: Cheyney (PGC/QB)
- 2018: Thiel (PGC/QB)
- 2019–2020: Rockford (assistant)
- 2021: Rockford (OC)
- 2022–present: Rockford

Head coaching record
- Overall: 8–32

Calvin Toliver is an American college football coach and former player. He is the head football coach for Rockford University, a position he has held since 2022. Toliver played college football as a quarterback and H-back at Delaware State University and professionally with the Wenatchee Valley Venom of the Indoor Football League (IFL) as a quarterback and wide receiver.

Toliver joined the coaching staff at Rockford in 2019, was promoted to offensive coordinator for the spring 2021 season, and succeeded J. T. Zimmerman as head coach in December 2021.

== Head coaching record ==
Year	Team	Overall	Conference	Standing	Bowl/playoffs
Rockford Regents (Northern Athletics Collegiate Conference) (2022–present)
2022	Rockford	1–9	0–8	9th	
2023	Rockford	2–8	1–7	T–8th	
2024	Rockford	4–6	2–6	7th	
2025	Rockford	1–9	0–8	9th	
2026	Rockford	0–0	0–0		
Rockford:		8–32	3–29		
Total:		8–32			
