= Bill McKeown =

American football coach (born 1941)

Biographical details
- Born: c. 1941 (age 84–85)

Playing career

Football
- c. 1963: Northeastern

Baseball
- 1962–1964: Northeastern
- Positions: End (football); Center fielder (baseball)

Coaching career (HC unless noted)

Football
- 1964: Brookline HS (MA) (assistant)
- 1965–1966: Boston University (OL)
- 1967: Western Illinois (DL)
- 1968: Brookline HS (MA) (assistant)
- 1969–1971: Curry
- 1972–1973: Northeastern (OC)
- 1974–1975: Jersey City State
- 1976: Pequannock Township HS (NJ)
- 1980–1982: Holliston HS (MA)
- 1983–1989: Brookline HS (MA)
- 1990: Dean
- 1992: Dean

Wrestling
- 1968–1969: Brookline HS (MA)

Administrative career (AD unless noted)
- 2001–2003: Brookline HS (MA)

Head coaching record
- Overall: 15–26–1 (college football); 11–7 (junior college football)

Accomplishments and honors

Championships
- 2 NEFC (1970–1971)

Bill McKeown (born c. 1941) is an American former football coach. He served as the head football coach at Curry College in Milton, Massachusetts from 1969 to 1971 and Jersey City State College—now known as New Jersey City University (NJCU)—Jersey City, New Jersey from 1974 to 1975, compiling a career college football coaching record of 15–26–1. A native of Brookline, Massachusetts, McKeown attended Northeastern University in Boston, where played football as an end and baseball as a center fielder.

McKeown was hired in 1990 as the head football coach at Dean Junior College—now known as Dean College–in Franklin, Massachusetts.

== Head coaching record ==
=== College football ===
Year	Team	Overall	Conference	Standing	Bowl/playoffs
Curry Colonels (New England Football Conference) (1969–1971)
1969	Curry	3–5			
1970	Curry	4–4–1		1st	
1971	Curry	6–2		1st	
Curry:		13–11–1			
Jersey City State Gothic Knights (New Jersey State Athletic Conference) (1974–1975)
1974	Jersey City State	0–9	5–5	6th	
1975	Jersey City State	2–6	1–4	6th	
Jersey City State:		2–15	1–9		
Total:		15–26–1			
National championship Conference title Conference division title or championship game berth

=== Junior college football ===
Year	Team	Overall	Conference	Standing	Bowl/playoffs
Dean Red Demons (Independent) (1990)
1990	Dean	7–2			
Dean Red Demons (Independent) (1992)
1992	Dean	4–5			
Dean:		11–7			
Total:		11–7			
