= Dean Peterson (American football) =

American football coach (born 1949)

Biographical details
- Born: August 14, 1949 (age 77)

Coaching career (HC unless noted)
- 1978–1980: Dean
- 1981–1986: Frostburg State

Head coaching record
- Overall: 27–29–3 (college); 20–4 (junior college)

Dean Peterson (born August 14, 1949) is an American former college football coach. He was the seventh head football coach at Frostburg State University in Frostburg, Maryland, serving for six seasons, from 1981 to 1986, and compiling a record of 27–29–3.

== Head coaching record ==
=== College ===
Year	Team	Overall	Conference	Standing	Bowl/playoffs
Frostburg State Bobcats (NCAA Division III independent) (1981–1986)
1981	Frostburg State	4–5			
1982	Frostburg State	6–2–2			
1983	Frostburg State	2–8			
1984	Frostburg State	6–3–1			
1985	Frostburg State	6–4			
1986	Frostburg State	3–7			
Frostburg State:		27–29–3			
Total:		27–29–3			

=== Junior college ===
Year	Team	Overall	Conference	Standing	Bowl/playoffs
Dean Red Demons (Independent) (1978–1979)
1978	Dean	7–1			
1979	Dean	7–1			
1980	Dean	6–2			
Dean:		20–4			
Total:		20–4			
