= Dean Bulldogs football =

College football team in Massachusetts

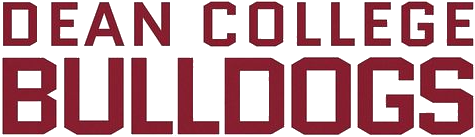
- First season: 1957; 69 years ago
- Athletic director: Eric Desmond Lee (Vice President of Athletics and Recreation)
- Head coach: Luke Bakanowsky; 1st season, 0–10 (.000)
- Location: Franklin, Massachusetts
- Stadium: Dale Lippert Field (capacity: 1,500)
- NCAA division: Division III
- Conference: MASCAC
- Colors: Cardinal, white, and black
- All-time record: 310–240–5 (.563)
- Bowl record: 1–1 (.500)

Conference championships
- 5
- Mascot: Bulldog
- Website: deanbulldogs.com

The Dean Bulldogs football team represents Dean College in college football at the NCAA Division III level. The Bulldogs are members of the Massachusetts State Collegiate Athletic Conference (MASCAC), having joined the conference in 2025. Dean competed in the Eastern Collegiate Football Conference (ECFC) from 2017 to 2024. The Bulldogs play their home games at Dale Lippert Field in Franklin, Massachusetts. Luke Bakanowsky is the head coach of the program. He took over from Andrae Murphy after the 2024 season.

The team was formally known as the Red Demons until 1994 when the school went from Dean Junior College to Dean College.

== Conference affiliations ==
- Unknown (1957–1997)
- Northeast Football Conference (1998–2015)
- Eastern Collegiate Football Conference (2017–2024)
- Massachusetts State Collegiate Athletic Conference (2025–present)

== List of head coaches ==
=== Key ===
Key to symbols in coaches list
| General | | Overall | | Conference | | Postseason (Note: Although the first Rose Bowl Game was played in 1902, it has been continuously played since the 1916 game, and is recognized as the oldest bowl game by the NCAA. "—" indicates any season prior to 1916 when postseason games were not played.) | |
|---|---|---|---|---|---|---|---|
| No. | Order of coaches (Note: A running total of the number of head coaches, with coaches who served separate tenures being counted only once. Interim head coaches are represented with "Int" and are not counted in the running total. "—" indicates the team played but either without a coach or no coach is on record. "X" indicates an interim year without play.) | GC | Games coached | CW | Conference wins | PW | Postseason wins |
| DC | Division championships | OW | Overall wins | CL | Conference losses | PL | Postseason losses |
| CC | Conference championships | OL | Overall losses | CT | Conference ties | PT | Postseason ties |
| NC | National championships | OT | Overall ties (Note: Overtime rules in college football were introduced in 1996, making ties impossible in the period since.) | C% | Conference winning percentage | | |
| † | Elected to the College Football Hall of Fame | O% | Overall winning percentage (Note: When computing the win–loss percentage, a tie counts as half a win and half a loss.) | | | | |

=== Coaches ===
List of head football coaches showing season(s) coached, overall records, conference records, postseason records, championships and selected awards
| No. | Name | Season(s) | GC | OW | OL | OT | O% | CW | CL | CT | C% | PW | PL | PT | DC | CC | NC | Awards |
|---|---|---|---|---|---|---|---|---|---|---|---|---|---|---|---|---|---|---|
| 1 | Sal Lombardo | 1957–1963 | 41 | 20 | 19 | 2 | 0.512 | – | – | – | – | – | – | – | – | – | – | – |
| 2 | Bruce Marshall | 1964–1965 | 16 | 10 | 6 | 0 | 0.375 | – | – | – | – | – | – | – | – | – | – | – |
| 3 | Jim Wolfe | 1966–1970 | 38 | 17 | 21 | 0 | 0.447 | – | – | – | – | – | – | – | – | – | – | – |
| 4 | Thomas H. Bell | 1971 | 7 | 4 | 3 | 0 | 0.571 | – | – | – | – | – | – | – | – | – | – | – |
| 5 | Tom Schoen | 1972–1973 | 14 | 7 | 6 | 1 | 0.536 | – | – | – | – | – | – | – | – | – | – | – |
| 6 | George Colfer | 1974 | 3 | 2 | 1 | 0 | 0.667 | – | – | – | – | – | – | – | – | – | – | – |
| 7 | Gary Scutt | 1975–1977 | 23 | 14 | 8 | 1 | 0.630 | – | – | – | – | – | – | – | – | – | – | – |
| 8 | Dean Peterson | 1978–1979 | 16 | 14 | 2 | 0 | 0.875 | – | – | – | – | – | – | – | – | – | – | – |
| 9 | James Attaway | 1980–1989 | 78 | 50 | 27 | 1 | 0.647 | – | – | – | – | – | – | – | – | – | – | – |
| 10 | Bill McKeown | 1990, 1992 | 18 | 11 | 7 | 0 | 0.611 | – | – | – | – | – | – | – | – | – | – | – |
| 11 | Rich Flanders | 1991 | 10 | 10 | 0 | 0 | 1.000 | – | – | – | – | – | – | – | – | – | – | – |
| 12 | Tom Rezzuti | 1993 | 9 | 7 | 2 | 0 | 0.778 | – | – | – | – | – | – | – | – | – | – | – |
| 12 | Jim Foster | 1994–1995 | 15 | 12 | 3 | 0 | 0.800 | – | – | – | – | – | – | – | – | – | – | – |
| 13 | Roger Pollard | 1996–1997 | 16 | 7 | 9 | 0 | 0.438 | – | – | – | – | – | – | – | – | – | – | – |
| 14 | Jack Charney | 1998–2003 | 53 | 20 | 33 | 0 | 0.377 | – | – | – | – | – | – | – | – | – | – | – |
| 15 | Todd Vasey | 2004–2015 | 120 | 82 | 38 | 0 | 0.683 | – | – | – | – | – | – | – | – | – | – | – |
| 16 | Steve Tirrell | 2016–2021 | 50 | 20 | 30 | 0 | 0.400 | – | – | – | – | – | – | – | – | – | – | – |
| 17 | Andrae Murphy | 2022–2024 | 28 | 3 | 25 | 0 | 0.107 | – | – | – | – | – | – | – | – | – | – | – |
| 18 | Luke Bakanowsky | 2025 | 0 | 0 | 0 | 0 | – | – | – | – | – | – | – | – | – | – | – | – |

== Year-by-year results ==
| National champions | Conference champions | Bowl game berth | Playoff berth |

| Season | Year | Head Coach | Association | Division | Conference | Record | | | | | | | Postseason | Final ranking |
| Season | Year | Head Coach | Association | Division | Conference | Overall | | | Conference | | | | Postseason | Final ranking |
| Season | Year | Head Coach | Association | Division | Conference | Win | Loss | Tie | Finish | Win | Loss | Tie | Postseason | Final ranking |
Dean Bulldogs
| 1957 | 1957 | Sal Lombardo | NJCAA | — | — | NR | | | | | | | | |
| 1958 | 1958 | Sal Lombardo | NJCAA | — | — | 6 | 2 | 1 | – | | | | | |
| 1959 | 1959 | Sal Lombardo | NJCAA | — | — | NR | | | | | | | | |
| 1960 | 1960 | Sal Lombardo | NJCAA | — | — | 6 | 2 | 1 | – | | | | | |
| 1961 | 1961 | Sal Lombardo | NJCAA | — | — | 0 | 7 | 0 | – | | | | | |
| 1962 | 1962 | Sal Lombardo | NJCAA | — | — | 3 | 5 | 0 | – | | | | | |
| 1963 | 1963 | Sal Lombardo | NJCAA | — | — | 5 | 3 | 0 | – | | | | | |
| 1964 | 1964 | Bruce Marshall | NJCAA | — | — | 4 | 4 | 0 | – | | | | | |
| 1965 | 1965 | Bruce Marshall | NJCAA | — | — | 6 | 2 | 0 | – | | | | | |
| 1966 | 1966 | Jim Wolfe | NJCAA | — | — | 4 | 4 | 0 | – | | | | | |
| 1967 | 1967 | Jim Wolfe | NJCAA | — | — | 3 | 4 | 0 | – | | | | | |
| 1968 | 1968 | Jim Wolfe | NJCAA | — | — | 2 | 6 | 0 | – | | | | | |
| 1969 | 1969 | Jim Wolfe | NJCAA | — | — | 5 | 3 | 0 | – | | | | | |
| 1970 | 1970 | Jim Wolfe | NJCAA | — | — | 3 | 4 | 0 | – | | | | | |
| 1971 | 1971 | Thomas Bell | NJCAA | — | — | 4 | 3 | 0 | – | | | | | |
| 1972 | 1972 | Tom Schoen | NJCAA | — | — | 5 | 2 | 0 | – | | | | | |
| 1973 | 1973 | Tom Schoen | NJCAA | — | — | 2 | 4 | 1 | – | | | | | |
| 1974 | 1974 | George Colfer | NJCAA | — | — | 2 | 1 | 0 | – | | | | | |
| 1975 | 1975 | Gary Scutt | NJCAA | — | — | 4 | 2 | 0 | – | | | | | |
| 1976 | 1976 | Gary Scutt | NJCAA | — | — | 5 | 2 | 1 | – | | | | | |
| 1977 | 1977 | Gary Scutt | NJCAA | — | — | 5 | 4 | 0 | – | | | | | |
| 1978 | 1978 | Dean Peterson | NJCAA | — | — | 7 | 1 | 0 | – | | | | | |
| 1979 | 1979 | Dean Peterson | NJCAA | — | — | 7 | 1 | 0 | – | | | | | |
| 1980 | 1980 | Dean Peterson | NJCAA | — | — | 6 | 2 | 0 | – | | | | | |
| 1981 | 1981 | James Attaway | NJCAA | — | — | 7 | 2 | 0 | – | | | | | 2 |
| 1982 | 1982 | James Attaway | NJCAA | — | — | 5 | 3 | 0 | – | | | | | 10 |
| 1983 | 1983 | James Attaway | NJCAA | — | — | 7 | 5 | 0 | – | | | | | |
| 1984 | 1984 | James Attaway | NJCAA | — | — | 4 | 4 | 0 | – | | | | | |
| 1985 | 1985 | James Attaway | NJCAA | — | — | 5 | 2 | 1 | – | | | | | |
| 1986 | 1986 | James Attaway | NJCAA | — | — | 5 | 4 | 0 | – | | | | | 6 |
| 1987 | 1987 | James Attaway | NJCAA | — | — | 3 | 5 | 0 | – | | | | | |
| 1988 | 1988 | James Attaway | NJCAA | — | — | 7 | 3 | 0 | – | | | | Bowl game berth | |
| 1989 | 1989 | James Attaway | NJCAA | — | — | 7 | 1 | 0 | – | | | | | |
| 1990 | 1990 | Bill McKeown | NJCAA | — | — | 7 | 2 | 0 | – | | | | | |
| 1991 | 1991 | Rich Flanders | NJCAA | — | — | 10 | 0 | 0 | – | | | | Bowl game berth | |
| 1992 | 1992 | Bill McKeown | NJCAA | — | — | 4 | 5 | 0 | – | | | | | |
| 1993 | 1993 | Tom Rezzuti | NJCAA | — | — | 7 | 2 | 0 | – | | | | | |
| 1994 | 1994 | Jim Foster | NJCAA | — | — | 6 | 2 | 0 | – | | | | | |
| 1995 | 1995 | Jim Foster | NJCAA | — | — | 6 | 1 | 0 | – | | | | | |
| 1996 | 1996 | Roger Pollard | NJCAA | — | — | 4 | 4 | 0 | – | | | | | |
| 1997 | 1997 | Roger Pollard | NJCAA | — | NEFC | 3 | 5 | 0 | – | | | | | |
| 1998 | 1998 | Jack Charney | NJCAA | — | NEFC | 2 | 7 | 0 | – | | | | | |
| 1999 | 1999 | Jack Charney | NJCAA | — | NEFC | 7 | 2 | 0 | – | | | | Conference champions | |
| 2000 | 2000 | Jack Charney | NJCAA | — | NEFC | 4 | 4 | 0 | – | | | | | |
| 2001 | 2001 | Jack Charney | NJCAA | — | NEFC | 2 | 6 | 0 | – | | | | | |
| 2002 | 2002 | Jack Charney | NJCAA | — | NEFC | 3 | 7 | 0 | – | | | | | |
| 2003 | 2003 | Jack Charney | NJCAA | — | NEFC | 2 | 7 | 0 | – | | | | | |
| 2004 | 2004 | Todd Vasey | NJCAA | — | NEFC | 2 | 8 | 0 | – | | | | | |
| 2005 | 2005 | Todd Vasey | NJCAA | — | NEFC | 6 | 4 | 0 | – | | | | | |
| 2006 | 2006 | Todd Vasey | NJCAA | — | NEFC | 7 | 3 | 0 | – | | | | | |
| 2007 | 2007 | Todd Vasey | NJCAA | — | NEFC | 9 | 1 | 0 | – | | | | Conference champions | |
| 2008 | 2008 | Todd Vasey | NJCAA | — | NEFC | 10 | 1 | 0 | – | | | | Conference champions | |
| 2009 | 2009 | Todd Vasey | NJCAA | — | NEFC | 9 | 2 | 0 | – | | | | Conference champions | |
| 2010 | 2010 | Todd Vasey | NJCAA | — | NEFC | 6 | 4 | 0 | – | | | | | |
| 2011 | 2011 | Todd Vasey | NJCAA | — | NEFC | 8 | 1 | 0 | – | | | | Bowl game berth | |
| 2012 | 2012 | Todd Vasey | NJCAA | — | NEFC | 7 | 3 | 0 | – | | | | | |
| 2013 | 2013 | Todd Vasey | NJCAA | — | NEFC | 6 | 4 | 0 | – | | | | | |
| 2014 | 2014 | Todd Vasey | NJCAA | — | NEFC | 6 | 4 | 0 | – | | | | | |
| 2015 | 2015 | Todd Vasey | NJCAA | — | NEFC | 6 | 3 | 0 | – | | | | | |
| 2016 | 2016 | Steve Tirell | Club team | | | 5 | 5 | 0 | – | | | | | |
| 2017 | 2017 | Steve Tirell | NCAA | Division III | ECFC | 4 | 6 | 0 | – | 2 | 5 | 0 | — | — |
| 2018 | 2018 | Steve Tirell | NCAA | Division III | ECFC | 5 | 5 | 0 | – | 4 | 2 | 0 | — | — |
| 2019 | 2019 | Steve Tirell | NCAA | Division III | ECFC | 4 | 6 | 0 | – | 4 | 1 | 0 | Conference champions | — |
Season canceled due to COVID-19
| 2021 | 2021 | Steve Tirell | NCAA | Division III | ECFC | 2 | 8 | 0 | – | 1 | 5 | 0 | — | — |
| 2022 | 2022 | Andrae Murphy | NCAA | Division III | ECFC | 1 | 9 | 0 | – | 1 | 5 | 0 | — | — |
| 2023 | 2023 | Andrae Murphy | NCAA | Division III | ECFC | 2 | 8 | 0 | – | 1 | 3 | 0 | — | — |
| 2024 | 2024 | Andrae Murphy | NCAA | Division III | ECFC | 0 | 8 | 0 | – | 0 | 3 | 0 | — | — |
| 2025 | 2025 | Luke Bakanowsky | NCAA | Division III | MASCAC | 0 | 10 | 0 | – | 0 | 9 | 0 | — | — |
