= International Wine and Spirit Competition =

Annual competition

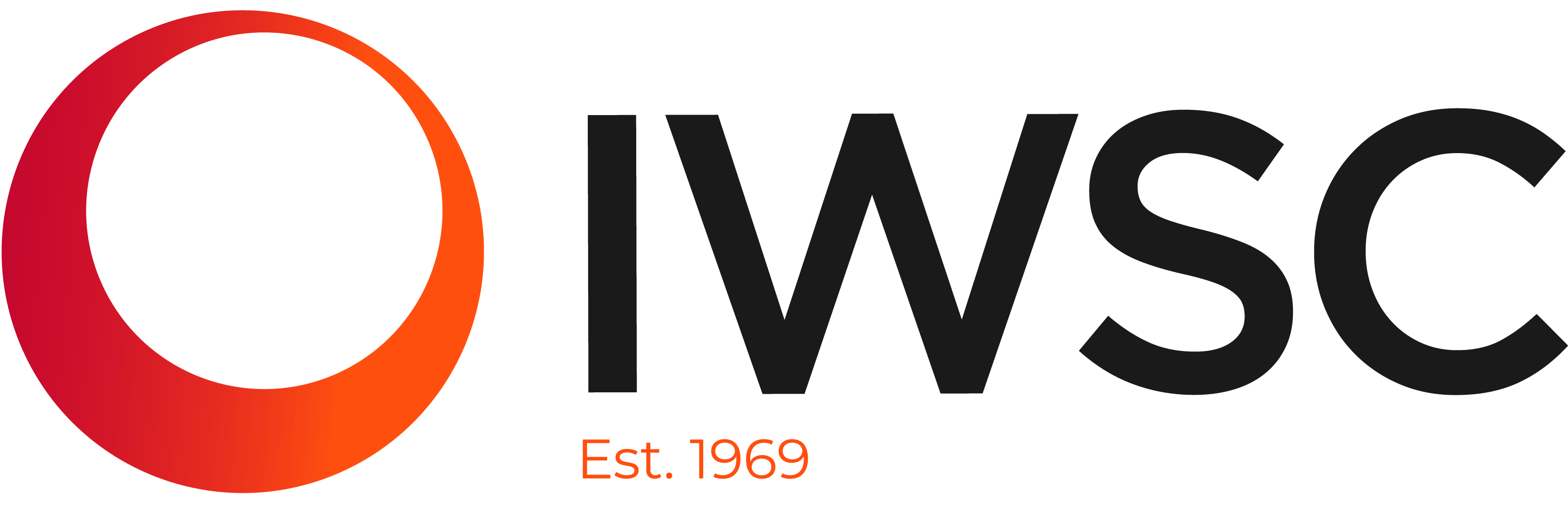
IWSC logo

The International Wine & Spirit Competition is an annual wine and spirit competition founded in 1969 by the German/British oenologist Anton Massel. Each year the competition receives 12,000 entries from over 90 countries worldwide. The awards given by the competition are considered as high honours in the industry. The judging occurs annually, in London. Only brands that pay the entry fee are judged, and two or four bottles of each entry must be supplied, depending on the category entered.

Depending on the points out of 100 awarded, submitted drinks can receive gold outstanding (for spirits only), gold, silver, or bronze awards, and there are no limitations on how many of each which can be awarded. Top-scoring products then advance to the trophy judging round; trophy winners are revealed only at the annual awards ceremony.

== Judging ==
The judging process consists of double-blind tasting, limited numbers of entries judged per day, and panel discussions. Samples are pre-poured in numbered glasses to guarantee anonymity. In certain categories, gold medal candidates are re-tasted by IWSC's independent Spirits Judging Committee for an additional round of judging. Entries are judged by panels drawn from 250 specialists from around the world.

=== Judging processes ===
In 2019, IWSC wine judging moved to London for the first time.

The competition makes use of over 250 specialist judges from all over the world. Many are Masters of Wine, Master Sommelier, some are winemakers or distillers, others are trade specialists, media, and global distribution, each judging in their special field.

=== Spirits Judging Committee ===
In addition to the judging panels, the Spirits category includes an independent "Spirits Judging Committee" that overseas all panel chairs and judges. The committee is tasked with leading each of the judging days, and committee members are also responsible for re-tasting every gold medal candidate for a final seal of approval.

== Annual award ceremony ==
The competition culminates in London in Autumn with the annual awards presentation and dinner, at the Roundhouse (previously the annual banquet was held at the City of London Guildhall).

== Presidents/industry champion ==
A president/industry champion is selected annually from the wines and spirits industry. After their term, they sit on the competition's advisory board.

- 2023 Richard Seale, Barbados
- 2022 Johann Krige, South Africa
- 2021 Michael Urquhart, UK
- 2020 Tamara Roberts, UK
- 2019 George Fistonich, New Zealand
- 2018 Facundo L. Bacardi
- 2017 Chris Blandy, Portugal
- 2016 Matteo Lunelli, Italy
- 2015 Neil McGuigan, Australia
- 2014 Laura Catena, Argentina
- 2013 G. Garvin Brown IV, US
- 2012 Mauricio González-Gordon y Díez, Spain
- 2011 Prince Robert of Luxembourg, France
- 2010 Prinz Michael zu Salm-Salm, Germany
- 2009 Sir Ian Good, UK
- 2008 Rafael Guilisasti, Chile
- 2007 Gina Gallo, US
- 2006 Anthony von Mandl, Canada
- 2005 Wolf Blass, Australia
- 2004 Paul Symington, Portugal
- 2003 Claes Dahlbäck, Sweden
- 2002 Dominique Hériard Dubreuil, France
- 2001 Warren Winiarski, US
- 2000 Baroness Philippine de Rothschild, France
- 1999 Miguel A. Torres, Spain
- 1998 Sir Anthony Greener, UK
- 1997 Jean Hugel, France
- 1996 Anton Rupert, South Africa
- 1995 Marchese Leonardo de Frescobaldi, Italy
- 1994 Michael Jackaman, UK
- 1993 Mme May de Lencquesaing, France
- 1992 Chris Hancock, Australia
- 1991 Peter Sichel, US
- 1990 Robert Drouhin, France
- 1989 Jos Ignacio Domecq, Spain
- 1988 Marchese Piero Antinori, Italy
- 1987 Kenneth Grahame, UK
- 1986 Max Lake, Australia
- 1985 Marquis de Goulaine, France
- 1984 Mme Odette Pol Roger, France
- 1983 Robert Mondavi, SA
- 1982 Hans Ambrosi, Germany
- 1981 Harry Waugh, UK
- 1980 Peter Noble
- 1979 Cyril Ray, UK
- 1978 Sir Reginald Bennett, UK
- 1977 Lord Montagu of Beaulieu, UK

== See also ==
- Spirits ratings
