= Jeff Yoo =

American soccer player

Jeff Yu
Personal information
- Date of birth: October 30, 1978 (age 48)
- Position: Forward

Youth career
- Averett University

Senior career*
Years	Team	Apps	(Gls)
2000	VfL Osnabrück	1	(0)
2000	Ulsan Hyundai Horang-i	3	(0)
2001	Bucheon SK	2	(0)
- * Club domestic league appearances and goals as of May 5, 2009

Jeff Yu, or Yu Ji-Young, (born October 30, 1978) is a former association football player.

Yu is the first American football (soccer) player to have played in the Korean K-League. He represented Ulsan Hyundai Horang-i in 2000 and Bucheon SK in 2001.

Yu had a brief spell with VfL Osnabrück in the German 2. Bundesliga.
