= Jim Schroeder =

American football coach (born c. 1977)

Current position
- Title: Head coach
- Team: Benedictine (IL)
- Conference: NACC
- Record: 50–23

Biographical details
- Born: c. 1977 (age 48–49)
- Education: Valparaiso University (2000, 2006)

Playing career
- 1996–1999: Valparaiso
- 2000: Dortmund Giants
- Position: Offensive lineman

Coaching career (HC unless noted)
- 2001: Valparaiso (GA)
- 2002: Columbia (DL)
- 2003–2004: Davidson (RB)
- 2005–2014: Benedictine (IL) (DC)
- 2015–2018: Rockford
- 2019–present: Benedictine (IL)

Head coaching record
- Overall: 58–54
- Tournaments: 0–1 (NCAA D-III playoffs)

Jim Schroeder (born c. 1977) is an American college football coach. He is the head football coach for Benedictine University, a position he has held since 2019. He was the head football coach for Rockford University from 2015 to 2018. He also coached for Valparaiso, Columbia, and Davidson. He played college football for Valparaiso as an offensive lineman and professionally for the Dortmund Giants of the German Football League 2 (GFL2).

== Head coaching record ==
Year	Team	Overall	Conference	Standing	Bowl/playoffs
Rockford Regents (Northern Athletics Collegiate Conference) (2015–2018)
2015	Rockford	3–7	1–5	6th	
2016	Rockford	1–9	0–6	7th	
2017	Rockford	1–8	1–5	T–5th	
2018	Rockford	3–7	2–5	T–6th	
Rockford:		8–31	4–21		
Benedictine Eagles (Northern Athletics Collegiate Conference) (2019–present)
2019	Benedictine	7–3	6–1	2nd	
2020–21	Benedictine	2–1	2–1	3rd	
2021	Benedictine	8–2	7–1	2nd	
2022	Benedictine	7–3	4–3	T–4th	
2023	Benedictine	5–4	5–3	4th	
2024	Benedictine	5–5	3–5	6th	
2025	Benedictine	7–3	5–3	T–3rd	
2026	Benedictine	9–2	7–1	2nd	L NCAA Division III First Round
Benedictine:		50–23	39–18		
Total:		58–54			
