= Tatia Daniels Granger =

President of Averett University
- Incumbent
- Assumed office August 1, 2026

Personal details
- Education: University of Virginia

Tatia Daniels Granger is a U.S. academic administrator serving as the 17th president of Averett University since 2026.

== Life ==
Granger earned a Bachelor of Arts in French from the University of Virginia in 1989, a Master of Education in the social foundations of education from the same institution in 1993, and a Ph.D. in higher education and leadership from the University of Virginia in 1999. She later completed a leadership coaching certificate at Georgetown University School of Continuing Studies in 2015 and a college teaching certificate from the College of William & Mary School of Education in 2017.

Granger began her career in higher education administration as assistant dean of undergraduate admission at the University of Virginia, serving from 1990 to 1994. She then directed the Center for Multicultural Student Services at James Madison University from 1994 to 1997. From 2000 to 2003, she served as chief of staff to the chief financial officer at Duke University. She subsequently held the position of vice president for enrollment services at Bennett College for Women from 2003 to 2005.

In 2008, Granger joined the College of William & Mary as its inaugural university ombuds, a role she held until 2016. Concurrently and afterward, she taught in the Mason School of Business, first as an adjunct professor of organizational behavior from 2013 to 2017 and then as clinical associate professor of organizational behavior beginning in 2017. Since 2019, she has also served as adjunct faculty in leadership coaching at Georgetown University's Institute for Transformational Leadership.

On August 1, 2026, Granger became the 17th president of Averett University. She is its second woman and first Black president.
