= Todd Parsons =

American football coach (born c. 1984)

Current position
- Title: Head coach
- Team: Curry
- Conference: CNE
- Record: 18–23

Biographical details
- Born: c. 1984 (age 41–42)
- Education: Averett University (2007); McDaniel College (2008)

Playing career
- 2003–2006: Averett
- Position: Quarterback

Coaching career (HC unless noted)
- 2007–2009: McDaniel (GA)
- 2010–2012: Salve Regina (OC)
- 2013: Assumption (ST/WR)
- 2014–2017: Brown (QB)
- 2018: Bentley (OC/QB)
- 2019: Endicott (OC/QB)
- 2020–2021: Endicott (AHC/OC)
- 2022–present: Curry

Head coaching record
- Overall: 18–23
- Bowls: 0–1

Todd Parsons (born c. 1984) is an American college football coach. He is the head football coach for Curry College, a position he has held since 2022. He also coached for McDaniel, Salve Regina, Assumption, Brown, Bentley, and Endicott. He played college football for Averett as a quarterback.

== Head coaching record ==
Year	Team	Overall	Conference	Standing	Bowl/playoffs
Curry Colonels (Commonwealth Coast Conference / Conference of New England) (2022–present)
2022	Curry	3–7	1–5	T–6th	
2023	Curry	3–7	1–4	5th	
2024	Curry	4–6	2–3	T–4th	
2025	Curry	8–3	6–1	2nd	L Fusion
2026	Curry	0–0	0–0		
Curry:		18–23	10–13		
Total:		18–23			
