= Rick Finotti =

American football coach

Coaching career (HC unless noted)
- ?: Villa Angela-St. Joseph HS (OH) (assistant)
- ?: Benedictine HS (OH) (assistant)
- 2005–2008: Mayfield HS (OH) (DC)
- 2009–2014: St. Edward HS (OH)
- 2015: Michigan (dir. ops.)
- 2016: Michigan (def. assis.)
- 2017–2021: John Carroll

Head coaching record
- Overall: 33–11 (college); 62–15 (high school)
- Tournaments: 0–1 (NCAA D-III playoffs)

Accomplishments and honors

Championships
- 2 Ohio Division I state (2010, 2014)

Awards
- Assistant Coach of the Year for Region III (Ohio) (2008); Head coach of the Year award (Ohio) (2010)

Rick Finotti is an American football coach. He served as the head coach of the John Carroll football team from January 2017 until March 2022.

== Early life ==
Finotti is a 1991 graduate of VASJ High School where he played for head coach Bill Gutbrod on the 1989 Ohio Division II state championship team. He attended Cleveland State University where earned his Business Administration degree and then completed his Post Baccalaureate Program from the College of Education.

== High school coaching ==
=== Assistant ===
Finotti served as an assistant coach at his alma mater Villa Angela-St. Joseph High School, as well as Benedictine High School and Mayfield High School. From 2005 until 2008, Finotti was the Wildcats' defensive coordinator. Those teams reached the Ohio State Playoffs in 2006, 2007 (state semifinals) and 2008. In his last year at Mayfield, Finotti was awarded Assistant Coach of the Year for Region III in the state of Ohio by the Ohio High School Coaches Association.

=== St. Edward ===
In six seasons at St. Edward (2009–14), Finotti amassed a record of 62-15 and guided the team to Ohio Division I state titles in 2010 and 2014. The 2010 state crown was the first in school history in the sport of football, with Finotti earning the in the state of Ohio as selected by the Associated Press. Both the 2010 and 2014 teams finished the season ranked #2 in the nation by the Max Preps Poll.

== College coaching ==
=== Michigan ===
After the 2014 season, Finotti was recruited by Jim Harbaugh to be his first Director of Football Operations at Michigan. In that role, Finotti provided administrative assistance for Harbaugh with regard to NCAA rules interpretations as well as serving as liaison for all academic matters related to current and prospective football student athletes. He coordinated and participated in the "Summer Swarm" and Summer Camps in 2015.

The following season, Finotti was a defensive assistant coach, serving as part of defensive coordinator Don Brown's staff. In 2016, Michigan was tied for first in total defense and stood alone atop the nation in third down defense. The Wolverines were second in scoring defense. He worked primarily with the defensive line and run game planning, mentoring a unit that finished second in the country in sacks.

=== John Carroll ===
On January 23, 2017, Finotti was named the head coach of the John Carroll Blue Streaks in University Heights, Ohio. Finotti coached the Blue Streaks for five seasons, compiling a record of 33–11 before stepping down in March 2022.

== Head coaching record ==
=== College ===
Year	Team	Overall	Conference	Standing	Bowl/playoffs	D3^{#}
John Carroll Blue Streaks (Ohio Athletic Conference) (2017–present)
2017	John Carroll	6–4	6–3	T–2nd		
2018	John Carroll	9–2	8–1	2nd	L NCAA Division III First Round	20
2019	John Carroll	9–1	8–1	2nd		13
2020–21	John Carroll	2–1	2–1	4th		
2021	John Carroll	7–3	7–2	T–2nd		
John Carroll:		33–11	31–8			
Total:		33–11				
