= Anton Matinlauri =

Finnish football coach (born 1989)

Personal information
- Date of birth: 31 May 1989 (age 37)
- Place of birth: Finland

Team information
- Current team: LAFC (head of strength & conditioning)

College career
Years	Team	Apps	(Gls)
2009–2013	Averett University		

Managerial career
- 2013: San Jose Earthquakes (fitness coach)
- 2015–2016: Sevilla (fitness coach)
- 2017–2020: HJK (fitness coach)
- 2021–2022: Fortaleza (head of conditioning)
- 2021–2022: Fortaleza (assistant)
- 2022–: LAFC (head of strength & conditioning)

Anton Matinlauri (born 31 May 1989) is a Finnish professional football coach. He is currently coaching in Major League Soccer side LAFC as the head of strength and conditioning.

== Career ==
Matinlauri played football and graduated from the Averett University in Danville, Virginia. After working for the MLS club San Jose Earthquakes, Matinlauri moved to Spain to study the master's degree at the University of Murcia. During the 2015–16 season, he was the fitness coach of La Liga club Sevilla.

In October 2017, Matinlauri started working for HJK Helsinki as fitness coach. He left HJK after the 2020 season.

In January 2021, he moved to Colombia to join Fortaleza C.E.I.F. as the director for conditioning coaching, and additionally worked as an assistant coach of the team.

Since March 2022, Matinlauri has worked in the technical staff of MLS franchise Los Angeles FC, serving as the club's head of strength and conditioning.
