= J. T. Zimmerman =

American football coach (born 1989)

Current position
- Title: Defensive coordinator & linebackers coach
- Team: Aurora
- Conference: NACC

Biographical details
- Born: March 22, 1989 (age 37)
- Education: Benedictine University (2011)

Playing career
- 2008–2011: Benedictine (IL)
- Position: Linebacker

Coaching career (HC unless noted)
- 2012: Benedictine (IL) (DL)
- 2013: Benedictine (IL) (DB)
- 2014: Western New England (DB)
- 2015–2018: Rockford (DC)
- 2019–2021: Rockford
- 2022–2023: Aurora (co-DC/ST/DL)
- 2024–present: Aurora (DC/LB)

Head coaching record
- Overall: 4–20

J. T. Zimmerman (born March 22, 1989) is an American college football coach. He is defensive coordinator and linebackers coach for Aurora University, positions he has held since 2024. He was the head football coach for Rockford University from 2019 to 2021.

== Career ==
Zimmerman played college football for Benedictine University as a linebacker.

In 2012, Zimmerman began his coaching career at his alma mater, Benedictine, as the defensive line coach. In 2013, he transitioned to the role of defensive backs coach. In 2014, he was hired for the same position for Western New England. After one year he was hired as the defensive coordinator for Rockford. In 2019, Zimmerman was named head football coach for Rockford following Jim Schroeder leaving for Benedictine. He was the youngest head coach at the NCAA Division III level at 29 years old. In three seasons he led the team to an overall record of 4–20 with his best season coming in 2021 as they finished 2–8. He resigned following the 2021 season. In 2022, he was hired as the co-defensive coordinator, special teams coordinator, and defensive line coach for Aurora.

== Head coaching record ==
Year	Team	Overall	Conference	Standing	Bowl/playoffs
Rockford Regents (Northern Athletics Collegiate Conference) (2019–2021)
2019	Rockford	1–9	0–7	8th	
2020–21	Rockford	1–3	1–2	T–4th	
2021	Rockford	2–8	1–7	T–8th	
Rockford:		4–20	2–16		
Total:		4–20			
