= Andrae Murphy =

American football coach (born 1986)

Biographical details
- Born: April 11, 1986 (age 40); Miami, Florida, U.S.
- Education: Dean College (2007); Salem State University (2015); Lynn University (2017); Columbia University (2019)

Playing career
- 2005–2007: Dean
- 2008: Bridgewater State
- Position: Defensive back

Coaching career (HC unless noted)
- 2009: Everglades HS (FL) (WR)
- 2010: J. P. Taravella HS (FL) (DB)
- 2014–2015: Massachusetts Maritime (DC/DB)
- 2016 (spring): Florida Atlantic (DQC)
- 2016: Holy Cross (DB)
- 2017: Columbia (DQC)
- 2018–2021: Columbia (DB)
- 2022–2024: Dean

Head coaching record
- Overall: 3–25

Accomplishments and honors

Awards
- First Team All-NFC (2007); First Team All-MASCAC (2008); First Team All-New England (2008)

Andrae Murphy (born April 11, 1986) is an American college football coach. He was the head football coach for Dean College from 2022 to 2024. He also coached for Everglades High School, J. P. Taravella High School, Massachusetts Maritime, Florida Atlantic, Holy Cross, and Columbia. He played college football for Dean and Bridgewater State as a defensive back.

== Playing career ==
Murphy began his college football career with Dean as a defensive back where he earned First Team All-Northeast Junior College honors. He transferred to Bridgewater State in 2008. With the Bears he earned First Team All-NEFC and First Team All-New England honor as a defensive back and linebacker. The team also won the 2008 NEFC Championship.

== Coaching career ==
After graduating from Bridgewater State University, Murphy joined Everglades High School in Everglades City, Florida, in 2009 as a wide receivers coach. In 2010, he moved on to J. P. Taravella High School in Coral Springs, Florida, as a defensive back coach.

Murphy earned his first college football coaching position as the defensive coordinator for Massachusetts Maritime of the Massachusetts State Collegiate Athletic Conference (MASCAC) in 2014. In his three-year stint with the Buccaneers, the team went 4–6 each season.

In 2016, Murphy joined Florida Atlantic as a defensive quality control coach before joining Holy Cross as a defensive backs coach. Following his stint with the Crusaders he joined Columbia as a defensive quality control coach. After one year in that position he transitioned into the defensive backs coach for the next four seasons.

=== Dean ===
Murphy was hired as Dean's head football coach following a 2–8 season and the stepping down of previous head coach Steve Tirrell. In his first season with the team they finished with a 1–9 record which was good enough for last in the Eastern Collegiate Football Conference (ECFC). He won his first game as a head coach against Alfred State in a 36–35 overtime win. Following a winless 2024 regular season, Murphy was relieved of his duties as head coach of the Bulldogs. He ended his career with a 3–25 total record with the NCAA division III program.

== Education and military service ==
Murphy graduated from Dean College with an associate degree in communications in 2007, Salem State University with a bachelor's degree in history in 2015, Lynn University with a master of business administration degree in sports management in 2017, and a master of science in sports management from Columbia University in 2019.

From 2011 to 2015, Murphy served in the United States Army as a combat infantry fire team leader. He earned multiple Army Commendation and Achievement medals.

== Head coaching record ==
Year	Team	Overall	Conference	Standing	Bowl/playoffs
Dean Bulldogs (Eastern Collegiate Football Conference) (2022–2024)
2022	Dean	1–9	1–5	7th	
2023	Dean	2–8	1–3	4th	
2024	Dean	0–8 (Note: Murphy was fired after the regular season and was replaced by Eric Desmond Lee before the ECFC playoffs.)	0–3	4th	
Dean:		3–25	2–11		
Total:		3–25			
