= Paul Huebner =

American football coach (born 1983)

Current position
- Title: Head coach
- Team: Martin Luther
- Conference: UMAC
- Record: 16–30

Biographical details
- Born: July 4, 1983 (age 43); West St. Paul, Minnesota, U.S.

Playing career
- 2005: Martin Luther
- Position: Defensive back

Coaching career (HC unless noted)
- 2006–2010: Shoreland Lutheran HS (WI) (assistant)
- 2011–2021: Shoreland Lutheran HS (WI)
- 2022–present: Martin Luther

Head coaching record
- Overall: 16–30 (college)

Paul Huebner (born July 4, 1983) is an American college football coach. He is the head football coach for Martin Luther College, a position he has held since 2022. Huebner was an accomplished soccer player as well as defensive back at Martin Luther, before becoming an assistant under Mark Stein at Shoreland Lutheran High School following his graduation from MLC. Huebner eventually succeeded Stein at Shoreland in 2011, coaching the Pacers to multiple state playoff appearances, which included a semifinal appearance in 2015. In 2022, Huebner again succeeded Stein, this time at his alma mater, taking over the Martin Luther Knights.

== Head coaching record ==
=== College ===
Year	Team	Overall	Conference	Standing	Bowl/playoffs
Martin Luther Knights (Upper Midwest Athletic Conference) (2022–present)
2022	Martin Luther	2–8	2–4	5th	
2023	Martin Luther	2–8	2–3	T–3rd	
2024	Martin Luther	6–4	4–3	T–3rd	
2025	Martin Luther	5–5	3–4	T–3rd	
2026	Martin Luther	1–5	1–2		
Martin Luther:		16–30	12–16		
Total:		16–30			
