= Mark Stein (American football) =

American football coach

Biographical details
- Education: Martin Luther College

Coaching career (HC unless noted)
- 1998: Wisconsin Lutheran HS (WI) (assistant)
- 1999–2011: Shoreland Lutheran HS (WI)
- 2015–2021: Martin Luther

Head coaching record
- Overall: 33–32 (college)
- Tournaments: 0–2 (NCAA D-III playoffs)

Accomplishments and honors

Championships
- 3 UMAC (2018)

Awards
- UMAC Coach of the Year (2017)

Mark Stein is an American college football coach. He was the head football coach at Martin Luther College in New Ulm, Minnesota, a position he held from 2015 to 2021. Inheriting a depleted roster during his first seasons, Stein has led a rebuilding of the MLC program, highlighted by being named Upper Midwest Athletic Conference Coach of the Year in 2017.

== Head coaching record ==
=== College ===
Year	Team	Overall	Conference	Standing	Bowl/playoffs
Martin Luther Knights (Upper Midwest Athletic Conference) (2015–2021)
2015	Martin Luther	2–8	1–8	T–9th	
2016	Martin Luther	0–10	0–9	10th	
2017	Martin Luther	5–5	4–5	T–6th	
2018	Martin Luther	9–2	8–0	1st	L NCAA Division III First Round
2019	Martin Luther	9–2	8–0	1st	L NCAA Division III First Round
2020–21	Martin Luther	3–1	1–0	T–1st	
2021	Martin Luther	5–4	5–1	2nd	
Martin Luther:		33–32	27–23		
Total:		33–32			
National championship Conference title Conference division title or championship game berth
