= Steve Nelson (American football) =

American football player and coach (born 1951)

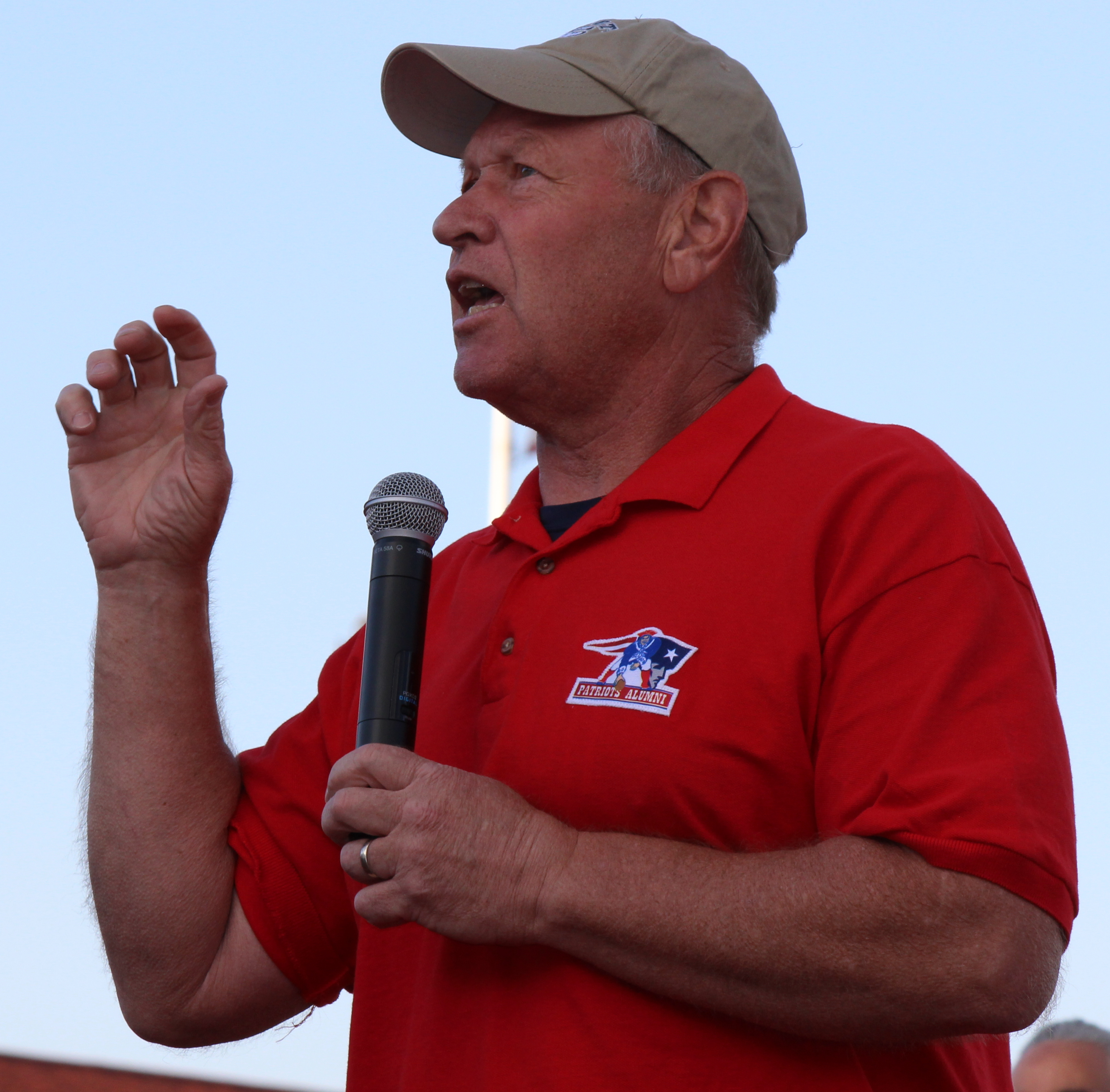
- Nelson in 2015

No. 57
- Position: Linebacker

Personal information
- Born: April 26, 1951 (age 75); Farmington, Minnesota, U.S.
- Listed height: 6 ft 2 in (1.88 m)
- Listed weight: 230 lb (104 kg)

Career information
- High school: Anoka (Anoka, Minnesota)
- College: North Dakota State
- NFL draft: 1974: 2nd round, 34th overall pick

Career history

Playing
- New England Patriots (1974–1987)

Coaching
- Curry (1998–2005) Head coach

Awards and highlights
- First-team All-Pro (1980); Second-team All-Pro (1984); 3× Pro Bowl (1980, 1984, 1985); New England Patriots All-1970s Team; New England Patriots All-1980s Team; New England Patriots 35th Anniversary Team; New England Patriots 50th Anniversary Team; New England Patriots Hall of Fame; New England Patriots No. 57 retired

Career NFL statistics
- Sacks: 19.5
- Interceptions: 17
- Fumble recoveries: 16
- Stats at Pro Football Reference

Steven Lee Nelson (born April 26, 1951) is a former professional football player and high school coach. He played as a linebacker for the New England Patriots of the National Football League (NFL) from 1974 to 1987. He served as the head coach at Curry College in Milton, Massachusetts from 1998 to 2005, compiling a record of 64–22.

Nelson was a three-sport athlete at Anoka High School, in Anoka, Minnesota, earning letters in football, basketball and baseball. As a senior, Nelson was selected as captain, team MVP and to the all-state team in football. Nelson went on to college at North Dakota State University and graduated in 1974 after being named a two-time All-American, team captain and MVP in football.

He was selected by the Patriots in the second round of the 1974 NFL draft. He was selected to the Pro Bowl three times in 1980, 1984, and 1985 and his #57 jersey was retired by the Patriots. He is credited with helping the Patriots reach Super Bowl XX versus the Chicago Bears.

Nelson played linebacker for the Patriots from 1974 to 1987 and became the nucleus of the Patriots defense. Nelson was voted to three Pro Bowls and recorded more than 100 tackles nine times during his career. He led the Patriots in tackles in eight of his 14 seasons, including an unofficial team record of 207 in 1984. He finished his career with 1,776 total tackles. After retirement, he coached for the Patriots and later built Curry College into a perennial power. In 1993, Nelson was inducted into the Patriots Hall of Fame.

More recently, Nelson has become a familiar football analyst on local television and radio. He currently works as a business development executive for Lighthouse Computer Services, Inc., a Lincoln, RI-based technology company. In September 2011, Nelson was named to the inaugural class of the Anoka High School Hall of Fame. He currently resides in Middleboro, MA with his wife Angela and his five daughters, Cameron, Caitlin, Casey, Kelli, and Grace.

== Head coaching record ==
Year	Team	Overall	Conference	Standing	Bowl/playoffs
Curry Colonels (New England Football Conference / Commonwealth Coast Football) (1998–2005)
1998	Curry	6–4	4–2	3rd (Blue)	
1999	Curry	7–3	5–1	2nd (Blue)	
2000	Curry	6–4	3–3	T–4th (Boyd)	
2001	Curry	9–2	4–1	2nd (Boyd)	
2002	Curry	7–3	3–2	T–2nd (Boyd)	
2003	Curry	11–1	6–0	1st (Boyd)	L NCAA Division III First Round
2004	Curry	9–2	5–1	T–1st (Boyd)	L NCAA Division III First Round
2005	Curry	9–3	6–0	1st (Boyd)	L NCAA Division III First Round
Curry:		64–22	36–10		
Total:		64–22			
National championship Conference title Conference division title or championship game berth

== See also ==
- Snowplow Game (game ball given to Nelson)
