= Steve Tirrell =

American football coach (born c. 1966)

Biographical details
- Born: c. 1966 (age 59–60); Concord, New Hampshire, U.S.
- Education: Plymouth State College (1989); Southern New Hampshire University (2019)

Playing career
- 1984–1988: Plymouth State
- Position: Defensive tackle

Coaching career (HC unless noted)
- 1989–1995: Plymouth State (DL)
- 1996–1997: Brown (ST/DL)
- 1998–1999: Brown (DL)
- 2000–2002: Northeastern (ST/DL)
- 2003: Northeastern (AHC/ST/DL)
- 2004–2006: UMass (AHC/ST/DL)
- 2007–2008: Nichols (AHC/DC)
- 2009–2011: UMass (ST/DL)
- 2016–2021: Dean
- 2022–2023: UMass (Spec. asst. to the HC)
- 2024 (spring): UMass (DL)
- 2024: East Coast Prep (MA) (DC)

Head coaching record
- Overall: 16–26
- Bowls: 0–1

Accomplishments and honors

Championships
- 1 ECFC (2019)

Awards
- ECFC Coach of the Year (2019); Plymouth State Hall of Fame (2001)

Stephen (Note: Tirrell's UMass profile spells his name as Stephen, while his Plymouth State profile spells it as Steven.) Tirrell (born c. 1966) is an American college football coach. He most recently served as the defensive coordinator for East Coast Prep, a position he held in 2024. He was the head football coach for Dean College from 2016 to 2021. He also coached for Plymouth State, Brown, Northeastern, Nichols, and UMass. He played college football for Plymouth State as a defensive tackle.

In 2001, Tirrell was inducted into the Plymouth State Hall of Fame.

== Head coaching record ==
Year	Team	Overall	Conference	Standing	Bowl/playoffs
Dean Bulldogs (NCAA Division III independent) (2016)
2016	Dean	1–1			
Dean Bulldogs (Eastern Collegiate Football Conference) (2017–2021)
2017	Dean	4–6	2–5	6th	
2018	Dean	5–5	4–2	3rd	
2019	Dean	4–6	4–1	1st	L New England
2020–21	No team—COVID-19				
2021	Dean	2–8	1–5	6th	
Dean:		16–26	11–13		
Total:		16–26			
National championship Conference title Conference division title or championship game berth
