= Matt Coyne =

American football coach (born c. 1990)

Current position
- Title: Head coach
- Team: Bates
- Conference: NESCAC
- Record: 7–29

Biographical details
- Born: c. 1990 (age 35–36); Bristol, Connecticut, U.S.
- Education: Wesleyan University (2012)

Playing career
- 2008–2009: Williams
- 2010–2011: Wesleyan
- Position: Quarterback

Coaching career (HC unless noted)
- 2012–2014: Wesleyan (WR)
- 2015: Oberlin (QB)
- 2016: Oberlin (OC/QB)
- 2017 (spring): Anna Maria (OC)
- 2017–2020: Wesleyan (DC/LB)
- 2021: Wesleyan (DC/ST/LB)
- 2022–present: Bates

Head coaching record
- Overall: 7–29

Matt Coyne (born c. 1990) is an American college football coach. He is the head football coach for Bates College, a position he has held since 2022. He also coached for Wesleyan, Oberlin, and Anna Maria. He played college football for Williams and Wesleyan as a quarterback.

== Head coaching record ==
Year	Team	Overall	Conference	Standing	Bowl/playoffs
Bates Bobcats (New England Small College Athletic Conference) (2022–present)
2022	Bates	3–6	3–6	T–6th	
2023	Bates	0–9	0–9	10th	
2024	Bates	2–7	2–7	T–8th	
2025	Bates	2–7	2–7	T–8th	
2026	Bates	0–0	0–0		
Bates:		7–29	7–29		
Total:		7–29			
