= Curry Colonels football =

- First season: 1959; 67 years ago
- Head coach: Todd Parsons; 4th season, 18–23 (.439)
- Location: Milton, Massachusetts
- Stadium: Walter M. Katz Field (capacity: 1,000)
- Conference: CNE
- Colors: Purple and white
- All-time record: 273–291–6 (.484)
- Bowl record: 0–3 (.000)

Conference championships
- 7

Conference division championships
- 6
- Website: CurryAthletics.com

The Curry Colonels football team is a college football that competes as part of National Collegiate Athletic Association (NCAA) Division III, representing Curry College in the Conference of New England (CNE).

== Championships ==
=== Conference championships ===
Curry claims 7 conference titles, the most recent of which came in 2007.

| Year | Conference | Overall Record | Conference Record | Coach |
|---|---|---|---|---|
| 1970 | New England Football Conference | 4–4–1 | 2–0 | Bill McKeown |
| 1971 | New England Football Conference | 6–2 | 3–0 | Bill McKeown |
| 2003 | New England Football Conference | 11–1 | 6–0 | Steve Nelson |
| 2004 | New England Football Conference | 9–2 | 5–1 | Steve Nelson |
| 2005 | New England Football Conference | 9–3 | 6–0 | Steve Nelson |
| 2006 | New England Football Conference | 11–1 | 7–0 | Skip Bandini |
| 2007 | New England Football Conference | 12–1 | 7–0 | Skip Bandini |

=== Division championships ===
Curry claims 6 division titles, the most recent of which came in 2009.

| Year | Division | Coach | Overall Record | Conference Record | Opponent | CG result |
|---|---|---|---|---|---|---|
| 2003 | NEFC Boyd | Steve Nelson | 11–1 | 6–0 | Westfield State | W 36–0 |
| 2004† | NEFC Boyd | Steve Nelson | 9–2 | 5–1 | Fitchburg State | W 17–7 |
| 2005 | NEFC Boyd | Steve Nelson | 9–3 | 6–0 | Fitchburg State | W 17–14 |
| 2006 | NEFC Boyd | Skip Bandini | 11–1 | 7–0 | Coast Guard | W 34–28 |
| 2007 | NEFC Boyd | Skip Bandini | 12–1 | 7–0 | Coast Guard | W 10–7 |
| 2009 | NEFC Boyd | Skip Bandini | 8–3 | 7–0 | Maine Maritime | L 42–48 |

† Co-champions

== Postseason games ==
=== NCAA Division III playoff games ===
Curry has appeared in the Division III playoffs six times, with an overall record of 2–6.

| Year | Round | Opponent | Result |
|---|---|---|---|
| 2003 | First Round | RPI | L, 20–34 |
| 2004 | First Round | Hobart | L, 16–35 |
| 2005 | First Round | Delaware Valley | L, 22–37 |
| 2006 | First Round | Springfield | L, 14–42 |
| 2007 | First Round; Second Round | Hartwick; St. John Fisher | W, 42–21; L, 7–38 |
| 2008 | First Round; Second Round | Ithaca; Cortland | W, 26–21; L, 0–42 |

=== Bowl games ===
Curry has participated in four bowl games, and has a record of 0–4.

| Season | Coach | Bowl | Opponent | Result |
|---|---|---|---|---|
| 2001 | Steve Nelson | ECAC Bowl | Worcester State | L 35–36 |
| 2002 | Steve Nelson | ECAC Bowl | Hartwick | L 14–69 |
| 2017 | Skip Bandini | New England Bowl | Framingham State | L 14–48 |
| 2025 | Todd Parsons | Fusion Bowl | Merchant Marine | L 24–27 |
