= Danville Regional Airport =

- IATA: DAN; ICAO: KDAN; FAA LID: DAN

Summary
- Airport type: Public
- Owner: City of Danville
- Serves: Danville, Virginia
- Elevation AMSL: 571 ft (174 m)
- Coordinates: 36°34′20″N 079°20′10″W
- Website: www.danville-va.gov/...

Map
- Location within Virginia Location within the United States

Runways
Direction	Length		Surface
Direction	ft	m	Surface
2/20	5,900	1,798	Asphalt
13/31	3,910	1,192	Asphalt

Statistics (2019)
- Aircraft operations: 19,120
- Based aircraft: 38
- Source: Federal Aviation Administration

Danville Regional Airport (IATA: DAN, ICAO: KDAN, FAA LID: DAN) is three miles east of Danville, in southern Virginia. The Federal Aviation Administration (FAA) National Plan of Integrated Airport Systems for 2017–2021 categorized it as a regional general aviation facility.

The first scheduled flights to the airport were Eastern Airlines DC-3s in 1947; Eastern pulled out in 1964. Piedmont Airlines arrived in 1948.

== Facilities ==
The airport covers 800 acres (320 ha) at an elevation of 571 feet (174 m). It has two asphalt runways: 2/20 is 5,900 by 100 feet (1,798 x 30 m) and 13/31 is 3,910 by 100 feet (1,192 x 30 m).

In the year ending December 31, 2019 the airport had 19,120 aircraft operations, average 52 per day: 100% general aviation and <1% military. In December 2019, 38 aircraft were based at the airport: 35 single-engine, 1 multi-engine, 1 jet, and 1 helicopter.

=== Taxiway revamp ===
In January 2017 the City Council of Danville approved a 3.1 million dollar project to rebuild taxiway A, and narrow it to 35 feet. Construction work was scheduled to begin in March 2017.
