= Dominique Hériard Dubreuil =

French businesswoman (born 1946)

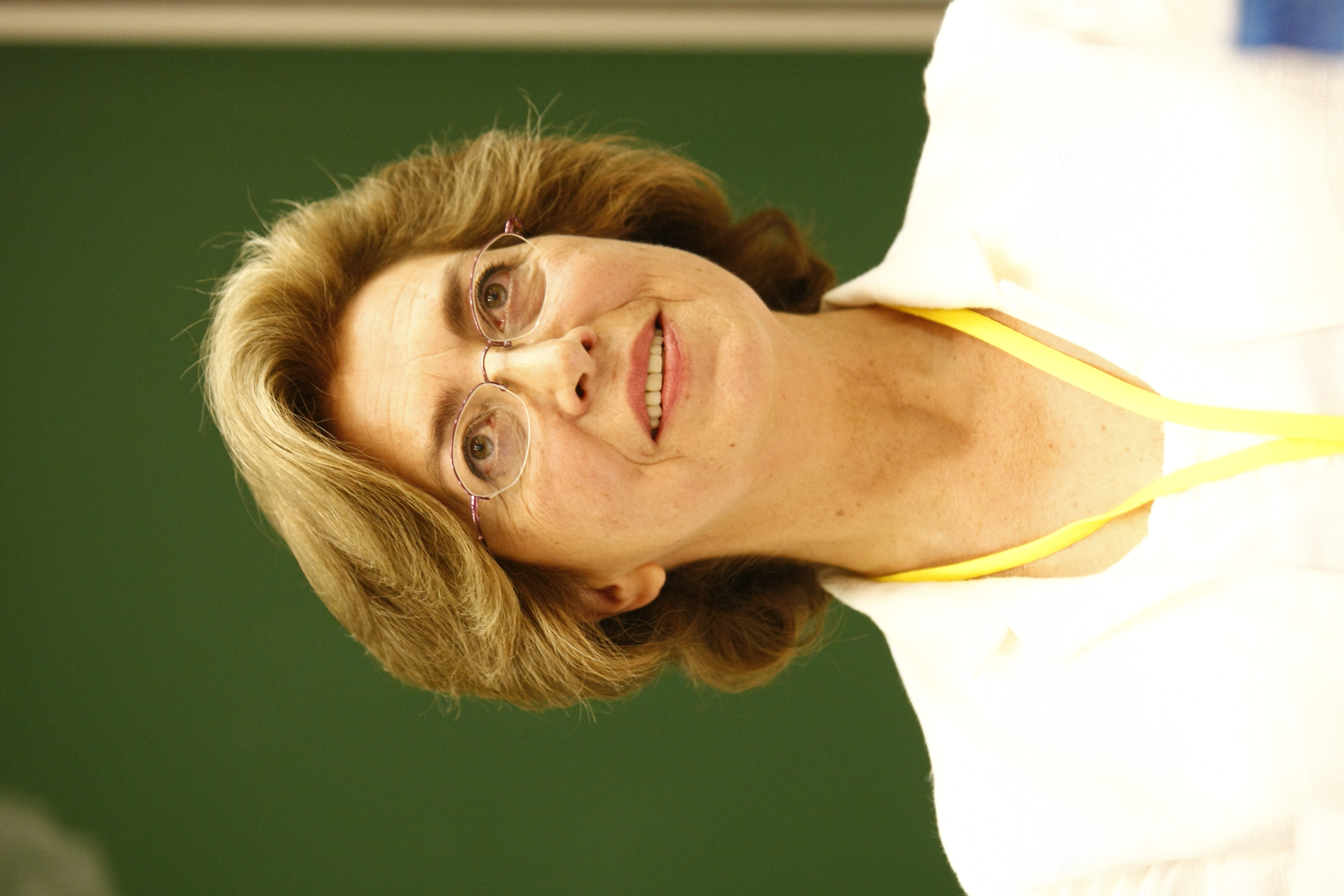
Dominique Dubreuil

Dominique Hériard Dubreuil (born in 1946) is a French businesswoman. She has been CEO of Rémy Cointreau since 2001 and chairman of the board of directors since 2004.

According to Fortune 2008, she is the 42nd most influential businesswoman in the world. Dubreuil is also a member of the board of FEVS (Fédération des exportateurs de vins & spiritueux), Comité Colbert, Vinexpo Américas, Baccarat and Stora Enso.
