= Ian Good =

Scottish businessman (1943–2023)

Sir Ian Good (September 25, 1943 – October 29, 2023) was a Scottish businessman.

== Biography ==
Ian Good was born on September 25, 1943, in Bishopton, Renfrewshire. His father was an industrial chemist. He was educated at the John Neilson Institution in Paisley and qualified as a chartered accountant with Smith & Williamson in Glasgow. Later, he worked for Price Waterhouse in London and Glasgow.

In 1969, Good joined Robertson & Baxter (R&B) as an executive assistant to managing director John Macphail. Good quickly advanced within the company, earning the trust of Miss Babs, and was appointed to the boards of Lang Brothers and Hepburn & Ross, companies acquired by R&B in the 1960s. He joined the R&B board in 1974 and became influential in shaping the management and direction of Edrington. In 1979, he appeared before competition authorities to oppose a takeover bid by the U.S. spirits company Hiram Walker for Highland Distillers, which co-produced The Famous Grouse whisky with R&B.

Good became chief executive in 1989 and chairman in 1994, retiring in 2013. From 2000 to 2005, he served as chair of the Scotch Whisky Association. He also served as the chairman of The Robertson Trust from 2000 to 2012.

Good co-owned racehorses and was chairman of Hamilton Park Racecourse from 1999. In 2000, he became the founding chairman of Scottish Racing and was elected to the Jockey Club in 2005. His horse, Penny a Day, won the 1995 Zetland Gold Cup at Redcar.

He was also a golfer at Erskine Golf Club.

== Personal life ==
In 1969, Good married Irene Mitchell; they had two daughters, Fiona and Catriona.
