= Averett Cougars =

- University: Averett University
- Conference: Old Dominion Athletic Conference
- Athletic director: Danny Miller
- Location: Danville, Virginia
- Football stadium: Frank R. Campbell Stadium
- Basketball arena: E. Stuart James Grant Center
- Baseball stadium: Owen-Fulton Field
- Softball stadium: Cougar Field
- Tennis venue: Averett Tennis Courts
- Nickname: Cougars
- Colors: Navy and gold
- Website: averettcougars.com

The Averett Cougars are the athletic teams that represent Averett University, located in Danville, Virginia, in NCAA Division III intercollegiate sports. The Cougars are members of the Old Dominion Athletic Conference for all sports. Altogether, Averett sponsors 24 sports: 13 for men and 11 for women.

Before joining the ODAC in 2022, the Cougars were members of the USA South Athletic Conference from 1978 to 2022.

== Varsity teams ==
Men's sports (13)	Women's sports (11)
Baseball	Basketball
Basketball	Cheerleading
Cheerleading	Cross country
Cross country	Dance
Equestrian	Equestrian
Football	Golf
Golf	Soccer
Lacrosse	Softball
Soccer	Tennis
Tennis	Track & field
Track & field	Volleyball
Volleyball
Wrestling
