= List of Massachusetts State Collegiate Athletic Conference football standings =

The Massachusetts State Collegiate Athletic Conference first sponsored football in the 2013 season. This is a list of its annual standings.

== Massachusetts State Collegiate Athletic Conference standings ==
2013 Massachusetts State Collegiate Athletic Conference football standings
	Conf.			Overall
Team	W		L	W		L
Framingham State $^	8	–	0	9	–	2
Western Connecticut	6	–	2	8	–	2
Bridgewater State	5	–	3	6	–	4
Fitchburg State	5	–	3	6	–	4
Westfield State	4	–	4	5	–	5
Massachusetts Maritime	3	–	5	5	–	5
UMass Dartmouth	3	–	5	3	–	6
Worcester State	1	–	7	3	–	7
Plymouth State	1	–	7	2	–	8
$ – Conference champion; ^ – NCAA Division III playoff participant

2014 Massachusetts State Collegiate Athletic Conference football standings
	Conf.			Overall
Team	W		L	W		L
Framingham State $	8	–	0	10	–	1
Western Connecticut	6	–	2	7	–	4
Worcester State	5	–	3	7	–	3
Fitchburg State	4	–	4	6	–	4
Westfield State	4	–	4	5	–	5
Bridgewater State	3	–	5	4	–	6
Massachusetts Maritime	3	–	5	4	–	6
UMass Dartmouth	3	–	5	4	–	6
Plymouth State	0	–	8	1	–	9
$ – Conference champion

2015 Massachusetts State Collegiate Athletic Conference football standings
	Conf.			Overall
Team	W		L	W		L
Framingham State $^	8	–	0	9	–	2
Fitchburg State	6	–	2	8	–	3
Bridgewater State	6	–	2	7	–	4
Western Connecticut	4	–	4	5	–	5
Worcester State	4	–	4	4	–	6
Massachusetts Maritime	3	–	5	4	–	6
UMass Dartmouth	3	–	5	4	–	6
Plymouth State	1	–	7	2	–	8
Westfield State	1	–	7	2	–	8
$ – Conference champion; ^ – NCAA Division III playoff participant

2016 Massachusetts State Collegiate Athletic Conference football standings
	Conf.			Overall
Team	W		L	W		L
Bridgewater State $^	8	–	0	8	–	3
Framingham State	6	–	2	8	–	3
Plymouth State	4	–	4	6	–	4
UMass Dartmouth	4	–	4	5	–	5
Western Connecticut	4	–	4	5	–	5
Fitchburg State	3	–	5	5	–	5
Massachusetts Maritime	3	–	5	4	–	6
Worcester State	3	–	5	3	–	7
Westfield State	1	–	7	2	–	8
$ – Conference champion; ^ – NCAA Division III playoff participant

2017 Massachusetts State Collegiate Athletic Conference football standings
	Conf.			Overall
Team	W		L	W		L
Framingham State +	7	–	1	10	–	1
Plymouth State +^	7	–	1	9	–	2
Western Connecticut	5	–	3	7	–	3
Worcester State	5	–	3	6	–	4
UMass Dartmouth	4	–	4	4	–	6
Westfield State	3	–	5	3	–	7
Fitchburg State	2	–	6	3	–	7
Bridgewater State	2	–	6	2	–	8
Massachusetts Maritime	1	–	7	2	–	8
+ – Conference co-champions; ^ – NCAA Division III playoff participant

2018 Massachusetts State Collegiate Athletic Conference football standings
	Conf.			Overall
Team	W		L	W		L
Framingham State $^	7	–	1	8	–	3
Western Connecticut	6	–	2	8	–	2
Bridgewater State	6	–	2	8	–	3
Plymouth State	5	–	3	6	–	4
UMass Dartmouth	4	–	4	5	–	5
Westfield State	4	–	4	5	–	5
Fitchburg State	2	–	6	2	–	8
Massachusetts Maritime	1	–	7	2	–	8
Worcester State	1	–	7	2	–	8
$ – Conference champion; ^ – NCAA Division III playoff participant

2019 Massachusetts State Collegiate Athletic Conference football standings
	Conf.			Overall
Team	W		L	W		L
Framingham State $^	8	–	0	8	–	3
Western Connecticut	6	–	2	8	–	3
Bridgewater State	6	–	2	6	–	4
UMass Dartmouth	5	–	3	7	–	3
Massachusetts Maritime	4	–	4	6	–	4
Plymouth State	4	–	4	6	–	4
Westfield State	2	–	6	2	–	8
Fitchburg State	1	–	7	2	–	8
Worcester State	0	–	8	0	–	10
$ – Conference champion; ^ – NCAA Division III playoff participant

2021 Massachusetts State Collegiate Athletic Conference football standings
	Conf.			Overall
Team	W		L	W		L
Framingham State $^	8	–	0	8	–	3
UMass Dartmouth	6	–	2	9	–	2
Bridgewater State	6	–	2	6	–	4
Plymouth State	5	–	3	5	–	5
Western Connecticut	4	–	4	5	–	5
Massachusetts Maritime	3	–	5	4	–	6
Worcester State	3	–	5	3	–	7
Westfield State	1	–	7	1	–	9
Fitchburg State	0	–	8	0	–	10
$ – Conference champion; ^ – NCAA Division III playoff participant

2022 Massachusetts State Collegiate Athletic Conference football standings
	Conf.			Overall
Team	W		L	W		L
UMass Dartmouth $^	8	–	0	9	–	2
Plymouth State	6	–	2	9	–	2
Western Connecticut	6	–	2	7	–	3
Bridgewater State	6	–	2	7	–	4
Framingham State	4	–	4	5	–	5
Massachusetts Maritime	3	–	5	3	–	7
Westfield State	2	–	6	2	–	8
Worcester State	1	–	7	1	–	9
Fitchburg State	0	–	8	1	–	9
$ – Conference champion; ^ – NCAA Division III playoff participant

2023 Massachusetts State Collegiate Athletic Conference football standings
	Conf.			Overall
Team	W		L	W		L
UMass Dartmouth +	7	–	1	9	–	2
Bridgewater State +	7	–	1	7	–	3
Western Connecticut +^	7	–	1	7	–	3
Framingham State	5	–	3	5	–	4
Plymouth State	4	–	4	4	–	6
Westfield State	3	–	5	3	–	7
Massachusetts Maritime	2	–	6	2	–	8
Worcester State	1	–	7	1	–	9
Fitchburg State	0	–	8	0	–	10
+ – Conference co-champions; ^ – NCAA Division III playoff participant

2024 Massachusetts State Collegiate Athletic Conference football standings
	Conf.			Overall
Team	W		L	W		L
UMass Dartmouth $^	9	–	0	10	–	1
Western Connecticut	8	–	1	9	–	2
Plymouth State	5	–	4	5	–	4
Bridgewater State	5	–	4	5	–	5
Massachusetts Maritime	5	–	4	5	–	5
Westfield State	4	–	5	4	–	6
Framingham State	3	–	6	3	–	7
Worcester State	3	–	6	3	–	7
Castleton	2	–	7	3	–	7
Fitchburg State	1	–	8	2	–	8
$ – Conference champion; ^ – NCAA Division III playoff participant

2025 Massachusetts State Collegiate Athletic Conference football standings
	Conf.			Overall
Team	W		L	W		L
Plymouth State +	7	–	2	8	–	2
Anna Maria +	7	–	2	7	–	3
Framingham State +^	7	–	2	7	–	4
UMass Dartmouth	6	–	3	6	–	4
Bridgewater State	5	–	4	5	–	5
Massachusetts Maritime	5	–	4	5	–	5
Westfield State	3	–	6	3	–	7
Worcester State	3	–	6	3	–	7
Fitchburg State	2	–	7	3	–	7
Dean	0	–	9	0	–	10
+ – Conference co-champions; ^ – NCAA Division III playoff participant
