= UMass Dartmouth Corsairs football under Mark Robichaud =

College head coaching tenure

Mark Robichaud is the former head coach of the UMass Dartmouth Corsairs team, which represents the University of Massachusetts Dartmouth in the NCAA, and participated in the New England Football Conference (NEFC) and the Massachusetts State Collegiate Athletic Conference (MASCAC) during his tenure. Robichaud was hired prior to the 2007 season and he led the resurgence of the UMass Dartmouth program following the retirement of William Kavanaugh. In 2007, the team played as a member of the NEFC. In 2013, UMass Dartmouth joined the newly formed MASCAC. Robichaud led the Corsairs to back-to-back (in 2021 and 2022) and compiled a 70–81 record. Under the leadership of Robichaud the Corsairs won their first ever MASCAC championship in the 2022 season and first postseason appearance since 2002 under Kavanaugh.

== Record ==
Year	Team	Overall	Conference	Standing	Bowl/playoffs
UMass Dartmouth Corsairs (New England Football Conference) (2007–2012)
2007	UMass Dartmouth	5–5	4–3	T–3rd	
2008	UMass Dartmouth	6–4	4–3	3rd	
2009	UMass Dartmouth	0–10	0–7	8th	
2010	UMass Dartmouth	3–7	2–5	6th	
2011	UMass Dartmouth	5–5	4–3	4th	
2012	UMass Dartmouth	1–9	1–6	T–6th	
UMass Dartmouth Corsairs (Massachusetts State Collegiate Athletic Conference) (2013–2022)
2013	UMass Dartmouth	3–6	3–5	T–6th	
2014	UMass Dartmouth	4–6	3–5	T–6th	
2015	UMass Dartmouth	3–6	3–5	T–6th	
2016	UMass Dartmouth	5–5	4–4	T–3rd	
2017	UMass Dartmouth	4–6	4–4	5th	
2018	UMass Dartmouth	5–5	4–4	T–5th	
2019	UMass Dartmouth	7–3	5–3	4th	
2020–21	No team				
2021	UMass Dartmouth	9–2	6–2	2nd	W New England Bowl
2022	UMass Dartmouth	9–2	8–0	1st	L NCAA Division III First Round
UMass Dartmouth:		70–81	55–59		
Total:		70–81			
National championship Conference title Conference division title or championship game berth

== Seasons ==
=== 2007 ===
2007 UMass Dartmouth Corsairs football
- Conference: New England Football Conference
- Record: 5–5 (4–3 NEFC)
- Head coach: Mark Robichaud (1st season)
- Defensive coordinator: Steve Faniel (1st season)
- Home stadium: Cressy Field

In June 2007, Mark Robichaud was hired by the University of Massachusetts Dartmouth following the retirement of long-time head coach William Kavanaugh. Kavanaugh retired as the programs all-time leader in wins and left with a final record of 104–64 including two New England Football Conference (NEFC) championships (in 1994 and 2002) and three bowl game appearances with one win. Robichaud game to UMass Dartmouth after spending the previous three seasons as an assistant coach for Bishop Stang High School. In his first game as head football coach, Robichaud lost to non-conference opponent WPI 17–49. He earned his first-career win against divisional opponent Fitchburg State in Fitchburg, Massachusetts, 48–35. He also went on a three-game winning streak against MIT, Western New England, and Salve Regina before losing two of the final three games of the season to finish his inaugural season with a record of 5–4 (4–3 in conference play) which was good enough to finish tied third in the Boyd Division of the NEFC.

Date	Time	Opponent	Site	Result	Attendance	Source
September 1	7:00 p.m.	at WPI*	Alumni Field; Worcester, MA	L 17–49	2,203	
September 8	12:00 p.m.	Bridgewater State	Cressy Field; Dartmouth, MA	L 17–31	1,800	
September 15	1:30 p.m.	at Fitchburg State	Elliot Field; Fitchburg, MA	W 48–35	1,001	
September 22	12:00 p.m.	Plymouth State	Cressy Field; Dartmouth, MA	L 28–35	1,600	
September 29	2:00 p.m.	at MIT	Steinbrenner Stadium; Cambridge, MA	W 49–14	375	
October 6	12:00 p.m.	Western New England	Cressy Field; Dartmouth, MA	W 34–14	1,000	
October 13	12:00 p.m.	at Salve Regina	Toppa Field; Newport, RI	W 17–0	750	
October 20	12:00 p.m.	Nichols^{†}	Cressy Field; Dartmouth, MA	L 10–21	1,550	
October 27	12:00 p.m.	Endicott	Cressy Field; Dartmouth, MA	W 40–14	1,000	
November 3	12:00 p.m.	at Curry	Walter M. Katz Field; Milton, MA	L 40–25	402	
*Non-conference game; ^{†}Homecoming; All times are in Eastern time

=== 2008 ===
2008 UMass Dartmouth Corsairs football
- Conference: New England Football Conference
- Record: 6–4 (4–3 NEFC)
- Head coach: Mark Robichaud (2nd season)
- Defensive coordinator: Steve Faniel (2nd season)
- Home stadium: Cressy Field

Date	Time	Opponent	Site	Result	Attendance	Source
September 5	7:00 p.m.	WPI*	Cressy Field; Dartmouth, MA	L 28–34	1,350	
September 13	12:00 p.m.	at Bridgewater State	Swenson Field; Bridgewater, MA	W 32–27	950	
September 20	6:00 p.m.	Fitchburg State	Cressy Field; Dartmouth, MA	W 45–17	1,050	
September 27	1:00 p.m.	at Plymouth State	Currier Field; Plymouth, NH	L 10–30	1,000	
October 4	3:00 p.m.	MIT	Cressy Field; Dartmouth, MA	W 51–20	1,250	
October 11	1:00 p.m.	at Western New England	Golden Bear Stadium; Springfield, MA	L 31–38	715	
October 18	12:00 p.m.	Salve Regina^{†}	Cressy Field; Dartmouth, MA	W 41–33	1,150	
October 25	1:00 p.m.	at Nichols	Vendetti Field; Dudley, MA	W 33–22	462	
November 1	5:00 p.m.	at Endicott	Endicott Stadium; Beverly, MA	W 53–35	629	
November 8	12:00 p.m.	Curry	Cressy Field; Dartmouth, MA	L 20–40	1,250	
*Non-conference game; ^{†}Homecoming; All times are in Eastern time

=== 2009 ===
2009 UMass Dartmouth Corsairs football
- Conference: New England Football Conference
- Record: 0–10 (0–7 NEFC)
- Head coach: Mark Robichaud (3rd season)
- Defensive coordinator: Steve Faniel (3rd season)
- Home stadium: Cressy Field

Date	Time	Opponent	Site	Result	Attendance	Source
September 5	12:00 p.m.	Alfred*	Cressy Field; Dartmouth, MA	L 6–35	1,200	
September 12	7:00 p.m.	Bridgewater State	Cressy Field; Dartmouth, MA	L 6–42	1,000	
September 19	1:30 p.m.	at Fitchburg State	Elliot Field; Fitchburg, MA	L 7–23	1,000	
September 26	12:00 p.m.	Plymouth State^{†}	Cressy Field; Dartmouth, MA	L 0–34	1,100	
October 3	1:00 p.m.	at MIT	Steinbrenner Stadium; Cambridge, MA	L 0–26	220	
October 10	7:00 p.m.	Western New England	Cressy Field; Dartmouth, MA	L 9–31	500	
October 17	12:00 p.m.	at Salve Regina	Gaudet Field; Middletown, RI	L 14–49	2,194	
October 24	12:00 p.m.	Nichols	Cressy Field; Dartmouth, MA	L 10–13	750	
October 31	12:00 p.m.	Endicott	Cressy Field; Dartmouth, MA	L 0–34	1,000	
November 7	1:00 p.m.	at Curry	Walter M. Katz Field; Milton, MA	L 12–28	1,727	
*Non-conference game; ^{†}Homecoming; All times are in Eastern time

=== 2010 ===
2010 UMass Dartmouth Corsairs football
- Conference: New England Football Conference
- Record: 3–7 (2–5 NEFC)
- Head coach: Mark Robichaud (4th season)
- Defensive coordinator: Steve Faniel (4th season)
- Home stadium: Cressy Field

Date	Time	Opponent	Site	Result	Attendance	Source
September 4	12:00 p.m.	Fitchburg State	Cressy Field; Dartmouth, MA	W 37–15	1,250	
September 11	1:00 p.m.	at Bridgewater State	Bridgewater-Raynham HS (MA); Bridgewater, MA	L 7–10	930	
September 18	1:00 p.m.	at Maine Maritime	Ritchie Field; Castine, ME	L 0–42		
September 25	12:00 p.m.	Plymouth State^{†}	Cressy Field; Dartmouth, MA	L 9–33	1,200	
October 2	1:00 p.m.	at MIT	Steinbrenner Stadium; Cambridge, MA	W 14–6	258	
October 9	6:00 p.m.	Salve Regina	Cressy Field; Dartmouth, MA	L 6–28	900	
October 16	12:00 p.m.	at Nichols	Vendetti Field; Dudley, MA	W 9–7	1,268	
October 23	12:00 p.m.	Endicott	Cressy Field; Dartmouth, MA	L 13–37	1,000	
October 30		Curry	Cressy Field; Dartmouth, MA	L 10–28		
November 6	1:00 p.m.	at Western New England	Golden Bear Stadium; Springfield, MA	L 14–37	1,075	
^{†}Homecoming; All times are in Eastern time

=== 2011 ===
2011 UMass Dartmouth Corsairs football
- Conference: New England Football Conference
- Record: 5–5 (4–3 NEFC)
- Head coach: Mark Robichaud (5th season)
- Offensive coordinator: Josh Sylvester (1st season)
- Defensive coordinator: Steve Faniel (5th season)
- Home stadium: Cressy Field

Date	Time	Opponent	Site	Result	Attendance	Source
September 2	7:00 p.m.	Mount Ida*	Cressy Field; Dartmouth, MA	W 24–21	850	
September 10	6:00 p.m.	Bridgewater State	Cressy Field; Dartmouth, MA	L 0–27	1,400	
September 17	1:00 p.m.	Maine Maritime	Cressy Field; Dartmouth, MA	L 13–21	1,350	
September 24	1:00 p.m.	at Plymouth State	Currier Field; Plymouth, NH	L 0–16	1,924	
October 1	12:00 p.m.	MIT	Cressy Field; Dartmouth, MA	W 31–29	1,000	
October 8	12:00 p.m.	at Salve Regina	Gaudet Field; Middletown, RI	L 7–38	800	
October 15	1:00 p.m.	Nichols^{†}	Cressy Field; Dartmouth, MA	L 21–6	1,100	
October 22	1:00 p.m.	at Endicott	Endicott Stadium; Beverly, MA	L 14–27	2,000	
October 29	1:00 p.m.	at Curry	Walter M. Katz Field; Milton, MA	W 33–7	550	
November 5	12:00 p.m.	Western New England	Cressy Field; Dartmouth, MA	L 18–28	1,300	
*Non-conference game; ^{†}Homecoming; All times are in Eastern time

=== 2012 ===
2012 UMass Dartmouth Corsairs football
- Conference: New England Football Conference
- Record: 1–9 (1–6 NEFC)
- Head coach: Mark Robichaud (6th season)
- Offensive coordinator: Josh Sylvester (2nd season)
- Defensive coordinator: Steve Faniel (6th season)
- Home stadium: Cressy Field

Date	Time	Opponent	Site	Result	Attendance	Source
August 31	7:00 p.m.	at Mount Ida*	Alumni Field; Newton, MA	L 21–24	2,000	
September 8	12:00 p.m.	at Bridgewater State	Swenson Field; Bridgewater, MA	L 6–31	1,200	
September 15	1:00 p.m.	at Framingham State	Bowditch Field; Framingham, MA	L 0–30	1,500	
September 22	4:00 p.m.	Plymouth State^{†}	Cressy Field; Dartmouth, MA	W 23–21	1,300	
September 29	12:00 p.m.	at MIT	Steinbrenner Stadium; Cambridge, MA	L 27–28	685	
October 6	12:00 p.m.	Salve Regina	Cressy Field; Dartmouth, MA	L 21–57	1,000	
October 13	1:00 p.m.	Nichols	Vendetti Field; Dudley, MA	L 16–26	1,059	
October 20	12:00 p.m.	Endicott	Cressy Field; Dartmouth, MA	L 15–61	1,000	
October 27	1:00 p.m.	Curry	Cressy Field; Dartmouth, MA	L 14–33	1,000	
November 3	1:00 p.m.	at Western New England	Golden Bear Stadium; Springfield, MA	L 12–38	1,499	
*Non-conference game; ^{†}Homecoming; All times are in Eastern time

=== 2013 ===
2013 UMass Dartmouth Corsairs football
- Conference: Massachusetts State Collegiate Athletic Conference
- Record: 3–6 (3–5 MASCAC)
- Head coach: Mark Robichaud (7th season)
- Offensive coordinator: Josh Sylvester (3rd season)
- Defensive coordinator: Steve Faniel (7th season)
- Home stadium: Cressy Field

Date	Time	Opponent	Site	Result	Attendance	Source
September 6	7:00 p.m.	Mount Ida*	Cressy Field; Dartmouth, MA	L 20–21	1,500	
September 21	1:00 p.m.	at Westfield State	Alumni Field; Westfield, MA	L 7–36	2,336	
September 28	1:00 p.m.	Maine Maritime^{†}	Cressy Field; Dartmouth, MA	W 38–14	1,000	
October 5	1:00 p.m.	at Framingham State	Bowditch Field; Framingham, MA	L 14–21	1,009	
October 11	7:00 p.m.	Bridgewater State	Cressy Field; Dartmouth, MA	W 33–29	250	
October 18	12:00 p.m.	Worcester State	Cressy Field; Dartmouth, MA	W 34–33	1,225	
October 26	12:00 p.m.	at Massachusetts Maritime	Clean Harbors Stadium; Buzzards Bay, MA	L 21–34	1,026	
November 2	1:00 p.m.	Western Connecticut	Cressy Field; Dartmouth, MA	L 12–35	500	
November 9	1:00 p.m.	at Fitchburg State	Elliot Field; Fitchburg, MA	L 20–25	1,000	
*Non-conference game; ^{†}Homecoming; All times are in Eastern time

=== 2014 ===
2014 UMass Dartmouth Corsairs football
- Conference: Massachusetts State Collegiate Athletic Conference
- Record: 4–6 (3–5 MASCAC)
- Head coach: Mark Robichaud (8th season)
- Offensive coordinator: Josh Sylvester (4th season)
- Defensive coordinator: Steve Faniel (8th season)
- Home stadium: Cressy Field

Date	Time	Opponent	Site	Result	Attendance	Source
September 5	7:00 p.m.	at Mount Ida*	Alumni Field; Newton, MA	W 21–14	1,894	
September 12	7:00 p.m.	Springfield*	Cressy Field; Dartmouth, MA	L 20–41	1,200	
September 20	4:00 p.m.	Westfield State^{†}	Alumni Field; Westfield, MA	L 13–14	1,300	
September 27	1:00 p.m.	at Plymouth State	Currier Field; Plymouth, NH	W 20–5	3,500	
October 4	12:00 p.m.	Framingham State	Cressy Field; Dartmouth, MA	L 14–48	600	
October 10	7:00 p.m.	at Bridgewater State	Swenson Field; Bridgewater, MA	W 37–10	703	
October 18	2:30 p.m.	at Worcester State	Coughlin Field; Worcester, MA	L 43–50	1,250	
October 25	12:00 p.m.	Massachusetts Maritime	Cressy Field; Dartmouth, MA	L 41–46	1,400	
November 1	12:00 p.m.	at Western Connecticut	The WAC; Danbury, CT	L 14–30	245	
November 8	1:00 p.m.	Fitchburg State	Cressy Field; Dartmouth, MA	W 37–36	1,000	
*Non-conference game; ^{†}Homecoming; All times are in Eastern time

=== 2015 ===
2015 UMass Dartmouth Corsairs football
- Conference: Massachusetts State Collegiate Athletic Conference
- Record: 4–6 (3–5 MASCAC)
- Head coach: Mark Robichaud (9th season)
- Offensive coordinator: Josh Sylvester (5th season)
- Defensive coordinator: Steve Faniel (9th season)
- Home stadium: Cressy Field

Date	Time	Opponent	Site	Result	Attendance	Source
September 4	7:00 p.m.	Mount Ida*	Cressy Field; Dartmouth, MA	W 41–6	2,000	
September 11	7:00 p.m.	at Springfield*	Stagg Field; Springfield, MA	L 17–35	2,300	
September 19	1:00 p.m.	at Westfield State	Alumni Field; Westfield, MA	W 48–41	2,163	
September 26	4:00 p.m.	Plymouth State	Cressy; Field	W 29–13	2,200	
October 3	2:00 p.m.	at Framingham State	Maple Street Field; Framingham, MA	L 14–26	1,008	
October 9	7:00 p.m.	Bridgewater State	Cressy Field; Dartmouth, MA	L 13–34	450	
October 16	7:00 p.m.	Worcester State	Cressy Field; Dartmouth, MA	L 32–45	750	
October 24	12:00 p.m.	at Massachusetts Maritime	Clean Harbors Stadium; Buzzards Bay, MA	L 34–35	1,412	
October 31	12:00 p.m.	Western Connecticut	Cressy Field; Dartmouth, MA	W 27–21	1,000	
November 7	1:00 p.m.	at Fitchburg State	Elliot Field; Fitchburg, MA	L 14–33	2,512	
*Non-conference game; All times are in Eastern time

=== 2016 ===
2016 UMass Dartmouth Corsairs football
- Conference: Massachusetts State Collegiate Athletic Conference
- Record: 5–5 (4–4 MASCAC)
- Head coach: Mark Robichaud (10th season)
- Offensive coordinator: Josh Sylvester (6th season)
- Defensive coordinator: Steve Faniel (10th season)
- Home stadium: Cressy Field

Date	Time	Opponent	Site	Result	Attendance	Source
September 2	6:00 p.m.	at Mount Ida*	Alumni Field; Newton, MA	W 40–9	2,451	
September 10	5:00 p.m.	Hartwick*	Cressy Field; Dartmouth, MA	L 41–48	2,015	
September 17	1:00 p.m.	Westfield State	Cressy Field; Dartmouth, MA	W 41–21	500	
September 24	1:00 p.m.	at Plymouth State	Currier Field; Plymouth, NH	L 14–30	1,924	
October 1	5:00 p.m.	Framingham State^{†}	Cressy Field; Dartmouth, MA	W 35–34 ^{OT}		
October 7	7:00 p.m.	at Bridgewater State	Swenson Field; Bridgewater, MA	L 19–27	665	
October 15	2:00 p.m.	at Worcester State	Coughlin Field; Worcester, MA	W 42–26	1,600	
October 22	12:00 p.m.	Massachusetts Maritime	Cressy Field; Dartmouth, MA	W 33–0	372	
October 29	5:00 p.m.	at Western Connecticut	The WAC; Danbury, CT	L 22–35	701	
November 5	1:00 p.m.	Fitchburg State	Cressy Field; Dartmouth, MA	L 14–22	650	
*Non-conference game; ^{†}Homecoming; All times are in Eastern time

=== 2017 ===
2017 UMass Dartmouth Corsairs football
- Conference: Massachusetts State Collegiate Athletic Conference
- Record: 4–6 (4–4 MASCAC)
- Head coach: Mark Robichaud (11th season)
- Offensive coordinator: Josh Sylvester (7th season)
- Defensive coordinator: Steve Faniel (11th season)
- Home stadium: Cressy Field

Date	Time	Opponent	Site	Result	Attendance
September 1	1:00 p.m.	Mount Ida*	Cressy Field; Dartmouth, MA	L 10–12	544
September 16	5:00 p.m.	Westfield State	Cressy Field; Dartmouth, MA	W 51–26	743
September 23	1:00 p.m.	at Plymouth State	Currier Field; Plymouth, NH	L 7–37	4,356
September 30	5:00 p.m.	Western Connecticut	Cressy Field; Dartmouth, MA	W 17–13	1,000
October 7	1:00 p.m.	at Curry*	Walter M. Katz Field; Milton, MA	L 27–30	1,043
October 13	7:00 p.m.	Bridgewater State	Cressy Field; Dartmouth, MA	L 22–24	532
October 21	2:00 p.m.	at Worcester State	Coughlin Field; Worcester, MA	L 40–45	1,400
October 28	12:00 p.m.	Framingham State	Cressy Field; Dartmouth, MA	L 14–34	1,000
November 4	12:00 p.m.	at Massachusetts Maritime	Clean Harbors; Buzzards Bay, MA	W 37–14	
November 11	12:00 p.m.	at Fitchburg State	Elliot Field; Fitchburg, MA	W 38–0	1,500
*Non-conference game; All times are in Eastern time

=== 2018 ===
2018 UMass Dartmouth Corsairs football
- Conference: Massachusetts State Collegiate Athletic Conference
- Record: 5–5 (4–4 MASCAC)
- Head coach: Mark Robichaud (12th season)
- Offensive coordinator: Josh Sylvester (8th season)
- Defensive coordinator: Steve Faniel (12th season)
- Home stadium: Cressy Field

Date	Time	Opponent	Site	Result	Attendance
September 1	1:00 p.m.	Alfred State*	Pioneer Stadium; Alfred, NY	W 49–21	837
September 8	12:00 p.m.	No. 23 Delaware Valley	Cressy Field; Dartmouth, MA	L 21–52	550
September 14	7:00 p.m.	at Westfield State	Alumni Field; Westfield, MA	W 28–9	1,500
September 22	5:30 p.m.	Plymouth State	Cressy Field; Dartmouth, MA	W 21–16	975
September 29	5:00 p.m.	at Western Connecticut	The WAC; Danbury, CT	L 27–40	1,823
October 13	4:00 p.m.	at Bridgewater State	Swenson Field; Bridgewater, MA	L 28–44	1,532
October 20	2:30 p.m.	Worcester State	Cressy Field; Dartmouth, MA	W 41–27	750
October 26	7:00 p.m.	at Framingham State	Bowditch Field; Framingham, MA	L 13–44	1,002
November 3	12:00 p.m.	Massachusetts Maritime	Cressy Field; Dartmouth, MA	W 20–0	350
November 10	12:00 p.m.	Fitchburg State	Cressy Field; Dartmouth, MA	L 29–32	450
*Non-conference game; Rankings from D3football.com Poll released prior to the game; All times are in Eastern time

=== 2019 ===
2019 UMass Dartmouth Corsairs football
- Conference: Massachusetts State Collegiate Athletic Conference
- Record: 7–3 (5–3 MASCAC)
- Head coach: Mark Robichaud (13th season)
- Offensive coordinator: Josh Sylvester (9th season)
- Defensive coordinator: Steve Faniel (13th season)
- Home stadium: Cressy Field

Date	Time	Opponent	Site	Result	Attendance
September 7	12:00 p.m.	Alfred State*	Cressy Field; Dartmouth, MA	W 54–7	1,033
September 14	12:00 p.m.	Husson*	Cressy Field; Dartmouth, MA	W 48–41 ^{OT}	1,117
September 21	4:30 p.m.	Fitchburg State	Cressy Field; Dartmouth, MA	W 37–14	1,442
September 28	2:00 p.m.	Plymouth State	Cressy Field; Dartmouth, MA	W 21–14	1,102
October 5	12:00 p.m.	at Framingham State	Bowditch Field; Framingham, MA	L 33–39	1,404
October 19	3:00 p.m.	at Bridgewater State	Swenson Field; Bridgewater, MA	L 20–56	1,865
October 26	3:00 p.m.	Worcester State	Cressy Field; Dartmouth, MA	W 46–8	1,250
November 2	6:00 p.m.	at Western Connecticut	The WAC; Danbury, CT	W 28–12	444
November 9	12:00 p.m.	Massachusetts Maritime	Cressy Field; Dartmouth, MA	L 14–28	1,284
November 16	12:00 p.m.	at Westfield State	Alumni Field; Westfield, MA	W 19–13	722
*Non-conference game; All times are in Eastern time

=== 2021 ===
2021 UMass Dartmouth Corsairs football

New England Bowl, W 42–16 vs. Alfred State
- Conference: Massachusetts State Collegiate Athletic Conference
- Record: 9–2 (6–2 MASCAC)
- Head coach: Mark Robichaud (14th season)
- Offensive coordinator: Josh Sylvester (10th season)
- Defensive coordinator: Steve Faniel (14th season)
- Home stadium: Cressy Field

Date	Time	Opponent	Site	Result	Attendance
September 4	1:00 p.m.	at Husson*	Winkin Complex; Bangor, ME	W 21–14	500
September 11	12:00 p.m.	Dean*	Cressy Field; Dartmouth, MA	W 48–29	1,008
September 18	12:00 p.m.	at Framingham State	Bowditch Field; Framingham, MA	L 21–45	1,100
September 25	12:00 p.m.	Worcester State	Cressy Field; Dartmouth, MA	W 52–7	1,025
October 2	5:00 p.m.	at Western Connecticut	The WAC; Danbury, CT	L 19–34	888
October 9	2:30 p.m.	Massachusetts Maritime	Cressy Field; Dartmouth, MA	W 26–10	1,562
October 16	2:00 p.m.	at Westfield State	Alumni Field; Westfield, MA	W 26–16	1,500
October 23	3:30 p.m.	Fitchburg State	Cressy Field; Dartmouth, MA	W 40–0	1,023
October 30	12:00 p.m.	at Bridgewater State	Swenson Field; Bridgewater, MA	W 26–20	850
November 13	12:00 p.m.	Plymouth State	Cressy Field; Dartmouth, MA	W 28–7	1,113
November 20	1:00 p.m.	Alfred State*	Cressy Field; Dartmouth, MA (New England Bowl)	W 42–16	2,120
*Non-conference game; All times are in Eastern time

=== 2022 ===
2022 UMass Dartmouth Corsairs football

MASCAC champion

NCAA Division III First Round, L 20–63 at Ithaca
- Conference: Massachusetts State Collegiate Athletic Conference
- Record: 9–2 (8–0 MASCAC)
- Head coach: Mark Robichaud (15th season)
- Offensive coordinator: Josh Sylvester (11th season)
- Defensive coordinator: Steve Faniel (15th season)
- Home stadium: Cressy Field

Date	Time	Opponent	Site	TV	Result	Attendance
September 3	12:00 p.m.	Husson*	Cressy Field; Dartmouth, MA		W 35–14	1,843
September 10	12:00 p.m.	at Anna Maria*	Caparso Field; Paxton, MA	Boxcast TV	L 48–63	197
September 17	1:30 p.m.	Framingham State	Cressy Field; Dartmouth, MA	LEC Network	W 46–21	1,921
September 24	2:30 p.m.	at Worcester State	John Coughlin Memorial Field; Worcester, MA	Youtube	W 41–20	1,206
September 30	7:00 p.m.	Western Connecticut	Cressy Field; Dartmouth, MA	LEC Network	W 48–21	2,500
October 6	7:00 p.m.	at Massachusetts Maritime	Clean Harbors Stadium; Buzzards Bay, MA	Boxcast TV	W 28–14	1,891
October 15	4:00 p.m.	Westfield State	Cressy Field; Dartmouth, MA	LEC Network	W 34–7	2,227
October 22	12:00 p.m.	at Fitchburg State	Elliot Field Athletic Complex; Fitchburg, MA	Boxcast TV	W 49–0	1,500
October 29	12:00 p.m.	Bridgewater State	Cressy Field; Dartmouth, MA	LEC Network	W 48–7	2,145
November 12	1:00 p.m.	at Plymouth State	Panther Field; Plymouth, NH	LEC Network	W 46–21	1,112
November 19	12:00 p.m.	at No. 9 Ithaca*	Butterfield Stadium; Ithaca, NY (NCAA Division III First Round)	ICTV	L 20–63	563
*Non-conference game; Rankings from AFCA Poll released prior to the game; All times are in Eastern time
