= William Kavanaugh =

William Kavanaugh may refer to:

- William Marmaduke Kavanaugh, U.S. senator from Arkansas
- William C. Kavanaugh, member of the Wisconsin State Assembly
- William Kavanaugh (American football), American football coach
- Bill Kavanaugh, his son, American football coach

== See also ==
- William Kavanaugh Oldham, acting governor of Arkansas
- William T. Cavanaugh, American Roman Catholic theologian
