= 2023 Massachusetts State Collegiate Athletic Conference football season =

2023 Massachusetts State Collegiate Athletic Conference season
- League: NCAA Division III
- Sport: football
- Duration: September 1, 2023; November 18, 2023
- Number of teams: 9
- TV partner(s): LEC Network

2024 NFL draft

Seasons
- ← 2022 2024 →

2023 Massachusetts State Collegiate Athletic Conference football standings
	Conf.			Overall
Team	W		L	W		L
UMass Dartmouth +	7	–	1	9	–	2
Bridgewater State +	7	–	1	7	–	3
Western Connecticut +^	7	–	1	7	–	3
Framingham State	5	–	3	5	–	4
Plymouth State	4	–	4	4	–	6
Westfield State	3	–	5	3	–	7
Massachusetts Maritime	2	–	6	2	–	8
Worcester State	1	–	7	1	–	9
Fitchburg State	0	–	8	0	–	10
+ – Conference co-champions; ^ – NCAA Division III playoff participant

The 2023 Massachusetts State Collegiate Athletic Conference season will be the 11th season of the Massachusetts State Collegiate Athletic Conference taking place during the 2023 NCAA Division III football season. The season will begin on September 1, 2023, with non-conference play and with conference play beginning on September 15, 2023.

== Preseason ==
=== Recruiting classes ===
National Rankings
Team	Total Signees
Bridgewater State	11
Fitchburg State	17
Framingham State	28
Massachusetts Maritime	13
Plymouth State	13
UMass Dartmouth	25
Western Connecticut	21
Westfield State	n/a
Worcester State	n/a

=== Preseason poll ===
The preseason poll was released on August 24, 2023.

MASCAC
Predicted finish	Team	Votes (1st place)
1	UMass Dartmouth	63 (7)
2	Bridgewater State	53
3	Western Connecticut	47 (1)
4	Framingham State	46 (1)
5	Plymouth State	41
6	Massachusetts Maritime	29
7	Westfield State	19
8	Worcester State	16
9	Fitchburg State	10

- First place votes in ()

== Head coaches ==
Team	Head coach	Years at school	Overall record	Record at school	MASCAC record
Bridgewater State	Joe Verria	8	37–26	37–26	34–14
Fitchburg State	Zach Shaw	1	0–0	0–0	0–0
Framingham State	Tom Kelley	19	120–67–1	120–67–1	64–8
Massachusetts Maritime	Jeremy Cameron	19	59–102	59–102	24–48
Plymouth State	Paul Castonia	20	87–125	85–97	33–39
UMass Dartmouth	Josh Sylvester	1	0–0	0–0	0–0
Western Connecticut	Joe Loth	11	110–101	54–37	31–17
Westfield State	Pete Kowalski	10	22–60	22–60	17–47
Worcester State	Adam Peloquin	4	4–16	4–16	4–12

== Schedule ==
Index to colors and formatting
MASCAC member won
MASCAC member lost
MASCAC teams in **bold**

All times EST time.

=== Regular season schedule ===
==== Week One ====
Date	Time	Visiting team	Home team	Site	TV	Result	Attendance	Ref.
September 1	6:00 PM	**UMass Dartmouth**	Nichols	Vendetti Field • Dudley, MA		**W** 57–6	564	
September 1	7:00 PM	**Worcester State**	WPI	Alumni Stadium • Worcester, MA		**L** 13–44	3,112	
September 2	12:00 PM	Merchant Marine	**Western Connecticut**	The WAC • Danbury, CT		**L** 35–12	775	
September 2	12:00 PM	**Westfield State**	Anna Maria	Caparso Field • Paxton, MA		**L** 26–51	368	
September 2	12:00 PM	**Fitchburg State**	Dean	Dale Lippert Field • Franklin, MA		**L** 17–33	1,007	
September 2	12:00 PM	**Bridgewater State**	MIT	Steinbrenner Stadium • Cambridge, MA		**L** 27–41	957	
September 2	1:00 PM	**Plymouth State**	Castleton	Dave Wolk Stadium • Castleton, VT		**L** 21–25	3,106	
^{#}Rankings from AP Poll released prior to game. All times are in EST.

==== Week Two ====
Date	Time	Visiting team	Home team	Site	TV	Result	Attendance	Ref.
September 7	6:30 PM	**Framingham State**	Salve Regina	Toppa Field • Newport, RI		**L** 0–29	2,107	
September 8	7:00 PM	Western New England	**Westfield State**	Alumni Field • Westfield, MA		**L** 0–46	2,000	
September 8	7:00 PM	Maritime	**Massachusetts Maritime**	Clean Harbors Stadium • Buzzards Bay, MA (Annual Chowder Bowl)		**L** 7–14	1,234	
September 8	7:00 PM	WPI	**Bridgewater State**	Swenson Field • Bridgewater, MA		**L** 21–24	1,504	
September 9	12:00 PM	New England (ME)	**Plymouth State**	Panther Field • Plymouth, NH		**L** 21–31	2,681	
September 9	12:00 PM	Union	Worcester State	John F. Coughlin Field • Worcester, MA		**L** 0–63	0	
September 9	3:00 PM	Castleton	**Fitchburg State**	Elliot Field • Fitchburg, MA		**L** 3–32	350	
September 9	5:00 PM	Curry	**UMass Dartmouth**	Cressy Field • Dartmouth, MA		**W** 28–14	2,788	
^{#}Rankings from AP Poll released prior to game. All times are in EST.

==== Week Three ====
Date	Time	Visiting team	Home team	Site	TV	Result	Attendance	Ref.
September 15	7:00 PM	**Westfield State**	**Western Connecticut**	The WAC • Danbury, CT		42–0 (WCSU)	775	
September 16	12:00 PM	**UMass Dartmouth**	**Framingham State**	Bowditch Field • Framingham, MA		33–7 (UMD)	800	
September 16	12:00 PM	**Fitchburg State**	**Worcester State**	John F. Coughlin Field • Worcester, MA		33–13 (WOR)	245	
September 16	12:00 PM	**Plymouth State**	**Bridgewater State**	Swenson Field • Bridgewater, MA		41–19 (BSU)	1,100	
September 16	12:00 PM	**Massachusetts Maritime**	Anna Maria	Caparso Field • Paxton, MA		**L** 30–37	391	
^{#}Rankings from AP Poll released prior to game. All times are in EST.

==== Week Four ====
Date	Time	Visiting team	Home team	Site	TV	Result	Attendance	Ref.
September 23	12:00 PM	**Westfield State**	**Framingham State**	Bowditch Field • Framingham, MA		9–8 (FRA)	1,000	
September 23	12:00 PM	**Worcester State**	**UMass Dartmouth**	Cressy Field • Dartmouth, MA	LEC Network	59–0 (UMD)	300	
September 23	1:00 PM	**Fitchburg State**	**Massachusetts Maritime**	Clean Harbor Stadium • Buzzards Bay, MA		21–3 (MMA)	1,891	
September 23	4:00 PM	**Western Connecticut**	**Bridgewater State**	Swenson Field • Bridgewater, MA		35–28 (BSU)	1,100	
^{#}Rankings from AP Poll released prior to game. All times are in EST.

==== Week Five ====
Date	Time	Visiting team	Home team	Site	TV	Result	Attendance	Ref.
September 30	12:00 PM	**Massachusetts Maritime**	**Westfield State**	Alumni Field • Westfield, MA		17–10 (WES)	1,017	
September 30	12:00 PM	**Bridgewater State**	**Fitchburg State**	Elliot Field • Fitchburg, MA		38–14 (BSU)	1,200	
September 30	1:00 PM	**Framingham State**	**Plymouth State**	Panther Field • Plymouth, NH		24–14 (FRA)	4,679	
September 30	4:00 PM	**UMass Dartmouth**	**Western Connecticut**	The WAC • Danbury, CT		52–21 (WCSU)	1,995	
^{#}Rankings from AP Poll released prior to game. All times are in EST.

==== Week Six ====
Date	Time	Visiting team	Home team	Site	TV	Result	Attendance	Ref.
October 6	12:00 PM	**Bridgwater State**	**Worcester State**	John F. Coughlin Field • Worcester, MA		35–7 (BSU)	912	
October 7	12:00 PM	**Framingham State**	**Fitchburg State**	Elliot Field • Fitchburg, MA		40–7 (FRA)	1,200	
October 7	1:00 PM	**Massachusetts Maritime**	**UMass Dartmouth**	Cressy Field • Dartmouth, MA		26–0 (UMD)	0	
October 7	4:00 PM	**Plymouth State**	**Western Connecticut**	The WAC • Danbury, CT		55–20 (WCSU)	1,001	
^{#}Rankings from AP Poll released prior to game. All times are in EST.

==== Week Seven ====
Date	Time	Visiting team	Home team	Site	TV	Result	Attendance	Ref.
October 12	12:00 PM	**Worcester State**	**Massachusetts Maritime**	Clean Harbors Stadium • Buzzards Bay, MA		22–19 (MMA)	2,134	
October 14	12:00 PM	**Western Connecticut**	**Framingham State**	Bowditch Field • Framingham, MA		56–34 (WCSU)	600	
October 14	12:00 PM	**Fitchburg State**	**Plymouth State**	Panther Field • Plymouth, NH		40–21 (PSU)	1,213	
October 14	2:00 PM	**UMass Dartmouth**	**Westfield State**	Alumni Field • Westfield, MA	LEC Network	26–23 OT (UMD)	2,326	
^{#}Rankings from AP Poll released prior to game. All times are in EST.

==== Week Eight ====
Date	Time	Visiting team	Home team	Site	TV	Result	Attendance	Ref.
October 20	7:00 PM	**Massachusetts Maritime**	**Western Connecticut**	The WAC • Danbury, CT		28–0 (WCSU)	880	
October 21	12:00 PM	**Worcester State**	**Plymouth State State**	Panther Field • Plymouth, NH		35–0 (PSU)	192	
October 21	4:00 PM	**Fitchburg State**	**UMass Dartmouth**	Cressy Field • Dartmouth, MA		42–7 (UMD)	419	
October 21	4:00 PM	**Westfield State**	**Bridgewater State**	Swenson Field • Bridgewater, MA		21–0 (BSU)	2,000	
^{#}Rankings from AP Poll released prior to game. All times are in EST.

==== Week Nine ====
Date	Time	Visiting team	Home team	Site	TV	Result	Attendance	Ref.
October 28	12:00 PM	**Framingham State**	**Massachusetts Maritime**	Clean Harbors Stadium • Buzzards Bay, MA		28–3 (FRA)	1,764	
October 28	12:00 PM	**UMass Dartmouth**	**Bridgewater State**	Swenson Field • Bridgewater, MA		34–14 (UMD)	1,500	
October 28	4:00 PM	**Plymouth State**	**Westfield State**	Alumni Field • Westfield, MA		20–19 (PSU)	1,207	
October 28	3:00 PM	**Western Connecticut**	**Worcester State**	John F. Coughlin Field • Worcester, MA			-	
^{#}Rankings from AP Poll released prior to game. All times are in EST.

==== Week Ten ====
Date	Time	Visiting team	Home team	Site	TV	Result	Attendance	Ref.
November 4	12:00 PM	**Western Connecticut**	**Fitchburg State**	Elliot Field • Fitchburg, MA		54-0 (WCSU)	1,200	
November 4	12:00 PM	**Bridgewater State**	**Framingham State**	Bowditch Field • Framingham, MA			-	
November 4	12:00 PM	**Worcester State**	**Westfield State**	Alumni Field • Westfield, MA			-	
November 4	12:00 PM	**Massachusetts Maritime**	**Plymouth State**	Panther Field • Plymouth, NH			-	
^{#}Rankings from AP Poll released prior to game. All times are in EST.

==== Week Eleven ====
Date	Time	Visiting team	Home team	Site	TV	Result	Attendance	Ref.
November 11	12:00 PM	**Westfield State**	**Fitchburg State**	Elliot Field • Fitchburg, MA		49-0 (WES)	1,200	
November 11	12:00 PM	**Bridgewater State**	**Massachusetts Maritime**	Clean Harbors Stadium • Buzzards Bay, MA (Cranberry Bowl)			-	
November 11	12:00 PM	**Plymouth State**	**UMass Dartmouth**	Cressy Field • Dartmouth, MA			-	
November 11	12:00 PM	**Framingham State**	**Worcester State**	John F. Coughlin Field • Worcester, MA			-	
^{#}Rankings from AP Poll released prior to game. All times are in EST.

== Head to head matchups ==
Head to head
Team	Bridgewater State	Fitchburg State	Framingham State	Massachusetts Maritime	Plymouth State	UMass Dartmouth	Western Connecticut	Westfield State	Worcester State
Bridgewater State	—	L 14–38	—	—	L 19–41	—	L 28–35	—	L 7–35
Fitchburg State	W 38–14	—	W 40–7	W 21–3	—	—	—	—	W 33–13
Framingham State	—	L 7–40	—	—	L 14–24	W 33–7	—	L 8–9	—
Massachusetts Maritime	—	L 3–21	—	—	—	W 26–0	—	W 17–10	L 19–22
Plymouth State	W 41–19	—	W 24–14	—	—	—	W 55–20	—	—
UMass Dartmouth	—	—	L 7–33	L 0–26	—	—	W 52–21	—	L 0–59
Western Connecticut	W 35–28	—	—	—	L 20–55	L 21–52	—	L 0–42	—
Westfield State	—	—	W 9–8	L 10–17	—	—	W 42–0	—	—
Worcester State	W 35–7	L 13–33	—	W 22–19	—	W 59–0	—	—	—

Updated with the results of all regular season conference games.

== Awards and honors ==
=== Player of the week honors ===
Week	Offensive			Defensive			Special Teams			Rookie		
Week	Player	Team	Position	Player	Team	Position	Player	Team	Position	Player	Team	Position
Week 1	Dante Aviles-Santos	UMass Dartmouth	QB	Trell Best	UMass Dartmouth	DB	Braedyn DeMarco	UMass Dartmouth	K	Rocky Marchitelli	Fitchburg State	QB
Week 2	Marvens Jean	UMass Dartmouth	WR	Trell Best (2)	UMass Dartmouth	DB	Isaiah Wright	Bridgewater State	RB	Jason Nickerson	UMass Dartmouth	DB
Week 3	James Cahoon	Bridgewater State	QB	Ryan Justin	Worcester State	DL	Joey Naso	Bridgewater State	K	Lance Williams	Worcester State	WR
Week 4	Adam Couch	Bridgewater State	RB	Jared Martino	Framingham State	LB	Isaiah Wright (2)	Bridgewater State	RB	Dae'Shawn Allen	Western Connecticut	RB
Week 4	Adam Couch	Bridgewater State	RB	Jared Martino	Framingham State	LB	Najier Monteiro	Framingham State	LB	Dae'Shawn Allen	Western Connecticut	RB
Week 5	Devaun Ford	Framingham State	RB	Max Margeson	Westfield State	DB	Aiden Figueroa	Western Connecticut	RB	Cooper Harvey	Westfield State	K
Week 6	Devaun Ford (2)	Framingham State	RB	Mike Henricksen	UMass Dartmouth	LB	Moise Nazaire	Framingham State	DB	Jorge Aquino Debes	Bridgewater State	DE
Week 7	Keion Jones	Western Connecticut	QB	Cade Nelson	Westfield State	DL	Cooper Harvey	Westfield State	K	Dae'Shawn Allen (2)	Western Connecticut	RB
Week 8	Luis Gonzalez	UMass Dartmouth	RB	Jack Cataldi	Plymouth State	RB	Angel Sanchez	UMass Dartmouth	WR	Dae'Shawn Allen (3)	Western Connecticut	RB

== Home game announced attendance ==
Team	Stadium	Capacity	Game 1	Game 2	Game 3	Game 4	Game 5	Game 6	Game 7	Total	Average	% of capacity
Bridgewater State	Swenson Field	1,600	1,504	1,100	1,100	**2,000†**	1,500	---	---	7,204	1,441	90.1%
Fitchburg State	Elliot Field	1,200	350	1,200†	1,200†	---	---	---	---	2,750	917	76.4%
Framingham State	Bowditch Field	5,130	800	1,000†	600	---	---	---	---	2,400	900	17.5%
Massachusetts Maritime	Clean Harbors Stadium	2,300	1,234	1,891	2,134†	1,764	---	---	---	7,023	1,756	76.3%
Plymouth State	Currier Memorial Field / Panther Field	1,200	**2,681**	**4,679†**	**1,213**	192	---	---	---	8,765	2,191	182.6%
UMass Dartmouth	Cressy Field	1,850	**2,788†**	300	0	419	---	---	---	3,507	877	47.4%
Western Connecticut	The WAC	4,500	775	775	1,995†	1,001	880	---	---	5,426	1,085	24.1%
Westfield State	Alumni Field	4,000	2,000	1,017	2,326†	1,207	---	---	---	6,550	1,310	32.8%
Worcester State	John F. Coughlin Field	2,500	0	245	912†	---	---	---	---	1,157	386	15.4%

Bold – exceeded capacity
† Season high

== Other headlines ==
On October 4, 2023, Anna Maria College announced it was leaving the Eastern Collegiate Football Conference and joining the MASCAC for the 2025–26 academic year.

On October 10, 2023 Dean College announced it was leaving the Eastern Collegiate Football Conference and joining the MASCAC for the 2025–26 academic year.
