= Paul Harrison (American football coach, born c. 1949) =

American football coach (1949–2019)

Biographical details
- Born: c. 1949; Middleborough, Massachusetts, U.S.
- Died: March 4, 2019 (aged 69–70); Lakeville, Massachusetts, U.S.
- Education: Andover Institute of Business; Unity College; Suffolk University

Coaching career (HC unless noted)

Football
- ?–1983: Middleborough HS (MA)
- 1984: Dennis-Yarmouth Regional HS (MA)
- 1985–1989: Southeastern Massachusetts
- 2017–2018: UMass Dartmouth (assistant)

Basketball
- ?–1983: Middleborough HS (MA)
- 1999–2000: Massasoit

Administrative career (AD unless noted)
- 2001–?: Martha's Vineyard HS (MA)
- ?–?: Framingham HS (MA)
- 2014–2019?: Northbrook Academy (MA)

Head coaching record
- Overall: 7–11 (college football); 16–26 (junior college basketball)

Paul Kenneth Harrison (c. 1949 – March 4, 2019) was an American football and basketball coach and athletic director. He was the first coach in Southeastern Massachusetts (now known as UMass Dartmouth) history as he coached there for their first five seasons. He also coached basketball for Massasoit Community College along with being the athletic directors for Martha's Vineyard Regional High School, Framingham High School, and Northbrook Academy.

== Early life and education ==
Harrison was born in 1949 in Middleborough, Massachusetts. He was the son of Paul and Winona Harrison. He attended and graduated from Andover Institute of Business with an Associate degree, Unity College with a Bachelor's degree in science, and Suffolk University for his Master's degree.

== Coaching career ==
=== Football ===
Until 1983, Harrison coached high school football for Middleborough High School.

In 1984, Harrison coached Dennis-Yarmouth Regional High School.

In 1985, Harrison was hired by Southeastern Massachusetts to be the team's first head coach in program history. For the first three seasons he led the team as it was only a club team. In 1988, the team's first non-club season, he led them to a 5–4 record with their first win ever coming against Western New England 23–15. The following season would be his last with the team as they went 2–7.

In 2017, Harrison returned to UMass Dartmouth as a volunteer assistant coach.

=== Basketball ===
Until 1983, Harrison coached Middleborough High School as a basketball coach alongside being the football coach. He coached his younger brother, David.

In 1999, Harrison was hired by Massasoit Community College to be their women's basketball head coach, replacing Mike Boyle after a season without a team. In two seasons with the team he led them to a 16–26 record, neither of them above .500.

== Head coaching record ==
=== College football ===
Year	Team	Overall	Conference	Standing	Bowl/playoffs
Southeastern Massachusetts Corsairs (Club team) (1985–1987)
1985	Southeastern Massachusetts				
1986	Southeastern Massachusetts				
1987	Southeastern Massachusetts				
Southeastern Massachusetts Corsairs (NCAA Division III independent) (1988–1989)
1988	Southeastern Massachusetts	5–4			
1989	Southeastern Massachusetts	2–7			
Southeastern Massachusetts:		7–11			
Total:		7–11			

=== Junior college basketball ===
Record table
Season	Team	Overall	Conference	Standing	Postseason
Massasoit Warriors (National Junior College Athletic Association) (1999–2000)
1999–00	Massasoit	7–12			
2000–01	Massasoit	9–14			
Massasoit:		16–26 (.381)			
Total:		16–26 .381			

== Administrative career ==
From 2001 until Harrison's death in 2019, he was the athletic director for Martha's Vineyard Regional High School, Framingham High School, and Northbrook Academy. For Northbrook he was also the headmaster.

== Personal life ==
For 31 years, Harrison was a teacher of business and social studies at Middleborough High School.

For 22 years, Harrison coached tennis for boys and girls throughout many summer camps.

Harrison was a founding father and minister to the Rochester Congregational Church.
