= Bill Kavanaugh =

American football player and coach (born c. 1982)

Biographical details
- Born: c. 1982 (age 43–44); Dartmouth, Massachusetts, U.S.
- Education: Bentley University (2004); Pennsylvania State University (2010)

Playing career
- 2000–2003: Bentley
- Position: Defensive end

Coaching career (HC unless noted)
- 2004–2006: UMass Dartmouth (ST/LB)
- 2007: Stonehill (DL)
- 2008: Bentley (assistant)
- 2008–2011: Penn State (GA)
- 2012: Penn State (WR)
- 2013: Penn State (RC)
- 2014–2021: Bentley

Head coaching record
- Overall: 40–34
- Tournaments: 0–1 (NCAA D-II playoffs)

Accomplishments and honors

Championships
- 1 NE-10 (2019)

Awards
- NE-10 Coach of the Year (2019)

William Kavanaugh Jr. (born c. 1982) is an American college football coach. He was the head football coach for Bentley University team from 2014 to 2021. He previously coached for UMass Dartmouth, Stonehill, and Penn State. He played college football for Bentley as a defensive end. He is the son of UMass Dartmouth Corsairs football team's former head coach William Kavanaugh.

== Head coaching record ==
Year	Team	Overall	Conference	Standing	Bowl/playoffs	AFCA^{#}
Bentley Falcons (Northeast-10 Conference) (2014–2021)
2014	Bentley	5–6	3–6	8th		
2015	Bentley	5–6	5–4	T–4th		
2016	Bentley	5–6	5–4	5th		
2017	Bentley	6–4	6–3	3rd		
2018	Bentley	4–6	4–5	6th		
2019	Bentley	6–4	6–2	T–1st		
2020–21	No team—COVID-19					
2021	Bentley	9–2	7–1	2nd	L NCAA Division II First Round	24
Bentley:		40–34	36–25			
Total:		40–34				
National championship Conference title Conference division title or championship game berth
