= Mark Robichaud =

American football coach (born 1964)

Biographical details
- Born: c. 1964 (age 61–62)

Playing career
- 1982–1985: Springfield
- Position: Linebacker

Coaching career (HC unless noted)
- 1986: Springfield (assistant)
- 1987: Milford Academy (NY) (assistant)
- 1988: Springfield (LB)
- 1989: Wesleyan (LB)
- 1990–1991: Chicago (DC)
- 1992–2001: Shepherd (DL/RC)
- 2000: Brown (assistant)
- 2001–2003: Portsmouth HS (RI) (assistant)
- 2004–2006: Bishop Stang (MA) (assistant)
- 2007–2022: UMass Dartmouth

Head coaching record
- Overall: 70–81
- Bowls: 1–0
- Tournaments: 0–1 (NCAA D-III playoffs)

Accomplishments and honors

Championships
- 1 MASCAC (2022)

Mark Robichaud (born c. 1964) is a former American college football coach. He served as the head football coach at the University of Massachusetts Dartmouth from 2007 until his retirement after the 2022 season; leading the UMass Dartmouth Corsairs football to a record of 70–81 in fifteen seasons. Robichaud previously was an assistant coach for Shepherd, where he helped lead the team to a record of 54–31 in that time span. During his time at Shepherd the team had eight winning seasons, five West Virginia Intercollegiate Athletic Conference (WVIAC) championships, three NCAA Division II Football Championship playoffs appearances, and two advances into the second round. At UMass Dartmouth, he led the team back to success by reaching the New England Bowl in 2021, and their first NCAA Division III Football Championship playoff appearance in twenty years in 2022. He finished second all-time in wins with the team.

== Coaching career ==
Robichaud began his coaching career with Springfield and Milford Academy. He then joined Wesleyan as a linebackers coach.

He got his first main coaching job as a defensive coordinator for Chicago. In 1991, his final year with the team, they finished 0–10 under Greg Quick.

In 1992, Shepherd hired Robichaud as the team's defensive line coach, recruiting coordinator, and athletic-academic advisor. In his nine year stretch with the team, the team went 54–31, including eight winning seasons, five West Virginia Intercollegiate Athletic Conference (WVIAC) championships, and three NCAA Division II tournament appearances, including two advancements to the second round.

During Robichaud's stint with Shepherd he worked with Division I team Brown where he worked as an assistant coach during the 2000 season.

In 2004, Robichaud joined Bishop Stang High School as an assistant coach. With the school, they won two Eastern Athletic Conference championships, two Massachusetts Interscholastic Athletic Association (MIAA) playoff berths, and an appearance in the 2005 MIAA Superbowl.

=== UMass Dartmouth ===
In 2007, Robichaud was hired by UMass Dartmouth to be their third head coach all-time, despite having no prior head coaching experience. He replaced William Kavanaugh, who resigned to become the head coach of Robichaud's previous team, Bishop Stang High School. In his first season with the team they went 5–5. The team started 0–5, but after beating Nichols, 28–7, the team won five straight to finish at an even .500. Over the next ten years the team was consistently below average, reaching as high 6–4 in 2008 and as low as 0–10 in 2009 and 1–9 in 2012.

In 2019, the Corsairs began the season with a 54–7 win over Alfred State and won their first four games of the season before falling to Framingham State 39–33. The team would drop another game to Bridgewater State 56–20 before winning their homecoming game against Worcester State 46–8. The team finished with a record of 7–3, their best since their last Bowl Game appearance in 2004 under Kavanaugh. In 2020, the season was cancelled due to the COVID-19 pandemic.

In 2021, Robichaud and the Corsairs were back to their winning ways after a year off after the cancellation of the 2020 season. Compiling a record of 9–2 enroot to a New England Bowl appearance where the team faced Alfred State. The game ended in a 42–16 win for the Corsairs, their first bowl win since 2003.

In 2022, Robichaud and the Corsairs compiled a 9–1 record en route to a playoff appearance and a MASCAC championship after beating Plymouth State 46–21 in Plymouth. He received the Murray Lewis Award, given to an outstanding football coach who positively influenced the game of football. Robichaud was named as the BSN Coach of the Year.

=== Retirement ===
On February 1, 2023, Robichaud announced his retirement from coaching.

== Personal life ==
Robichaud and his wife live in Oklahoma and have two children. He previously served as a physical education teacher for Wesleyan University and Westport Middle School.

== Head coaching record ==
| Year | Team | Overall | Conference | Standing | Bowl/playoffs |
|---|---|---|---|---|---|
UMass Dartmouth Corsairs (New England Football Conference) (2007–2012)
| 2007 | UMass Dartmouth | 5–5 | 4–3 | T–3rd | |
| 2008 | UMass Dartmouth | 6–4 | 4–3 | 3rd | |
| 2009 | UMass Dartmouth | 0–10 | 0–7 | 8th | |
| 2010 | UMass Dartmouth | 3–7 | 2–5 | 6th | |
| 2011 | UMass Dartmouth | 5–5 | 4–3 | 4th | |
| 2012 | UMass Dartmouth | 1–9 | 1–6 | T–6th | |
UMass Dartmouth Corsairs (Massachusetts State Collegiate Athletic Conference) (2013–2022)
| 2013 | UMass Dartmouth | 3–6 | 3–5 | T–6th | |
| 2014 | UMass Dartmouth | 4–6 | 3–5 | T–6th | |
| 2015 | UMass Dartmouth | 3–6 | 3–5 | T–6th | |
| 2016 | UMass Dartmouth | 5–5 | 4–4 | T–3rd | |
| 2017 | UMass Dartmouth | 4–6 | 4–4 | 5th | |
| 2018 | UMass Dartmouth | 5–5 | 4–4 | T–5th | |
| 2019 | UMass Dartmouth | 7–3 | 5–3 | 4th | |
| 2020–21 | No team—COVID-19 | | | | |
| 2021 | UMass Dartmouth | 9–2 | 6–2 | 2nd | W New England |
| 2022 | UMass Dartmouth | 9–2 | 8–0 | 1st | L NCAA Division III First Round |
| UMass Dartmouth: | | 70–81 | 55–59 | | |
| Total: | | 70–81 | | | |
National championship Conference title Conference division title or championship game berth

== See also ==
- UMass Dartmouth Corsairs football under Mark Robichaud
