= 2021 UMass Dartmouth Corsairs football team =

American college football season

2021 UMass Dartmouth Corsairs football

New England Bowl, W 42–16 vs. Alfred State
- Conference: Massachusetts State Collegiate Athletic Conference
- Record: 9–2 (6–2 MASCAC)
- Head coach: Mark Robichaud (14th season)
- Offensive coordinator: Josh Sylvester (10th season)
- Defensive coordinator: Steve Faniel (14th season)
- Home stadium: Cressy Field

2021 Massachusetts State Collegiate Athletic Conference football standings
	Conf.			Overall
Team	W		L	W		L
Framingham State $^	8	–	0	8	–	3
UMass Dartmouth	6	–	2	9	–	2
Bridgewater State	6	–	2	6	–	4
Plymouth State	5	–	3	5	–	5
Western Connecticut	4	–	4	5	–	5
Massachusetts Maritime	3	–	5	4	–	6
Worcester State	3	–	5	3	–	7
Westfield State	1	–	7	1	–	9
Fitchburg State	0	–	8	0	–	10
$ – Conference champion; ^ – NCAA Division III playoff participant

The 2021 UMass Dartmouth Corsairs football team represented the University of Massachusetts Dartmouth as a member of the Massachusetts State Collegiate Athletic Conference (MASCAC) during the 2021 NCAA Division III football season. The Corsairs, led by 15th-year head coach Mark Robichaud, played their home games at Cressy Field in Dartmouth, Massachusetts.

The Corsairs 2020 season was cancelled due to the COVID-19 pandemic.

== Schedule ==
Date	Time	Opponent	Site	Result	Attendance
September 4	1:00 p.m.	at Husson*	Winkin Complex; Bangor, ME	W 21–14	500
September 11	12:00 p.m.	Dean*	Cressy Field; Dartmouth, MA	W 48–29	1,008
September 18	12:00 p.m.	at Framingham State	Bowditch Field; Framingham, MA	L 21–45	1,100
September 25	12:00 p.m.	Worcester State	Cressy Field; Dartmouth, MA	W 52–7	1,025
October 2	5:00 p.m.	at Western Connecticut	The WAC; Danbury, CT	L 19–34	888
October 9	2:30 p.m.	Massachusetts Maritime	Cressy Field; Dartmouth, MA	W 26–10	1,562
October 16	2:00 p.m.	at Westfield State	Alumni Field; Westfield, MA	W 26–16	1,500
October 23	3:30 p.m.	Fitchburg State	Cressy Field; Dartmouth, MA	W 40–0	1,023
October 30	12:00 p.m.	at Bridgewater State	Swenson Field; Bridgewater, MA	W 26–20	850
November 13	12:00 p.m.	Plymouth State	Cressy Field; Dartmouth, MA	W 28–7	1,113
November 20	1:00 p.m.	Alfred State*	Cressy Field; Dartmouth, MA (New England Bowl)	W 42–16	2,120
*Non-conference game; All times are in Eastern time

== Game summaries ==
=== At Husson ===
Game One – UMass Dartmouth Corsairs (0–0) vs Husson Eagles (0–0)

Quarter	1	2	3	4	Total
UMass Dartmouth	0	7	6	8	21
Husson	0	7	0	7	14

at Winkin Complex • Bangor, Maine

- Date: Saturday, September 4, 2021
- Game time: 1:00 p.m. EST
- Game weather: Sunny and Warm
- Game attendance: 500
- Referee: Rick Puente

Game information

First quarter

No Scoring

Second quarter

- (13:36) HUS – Tucker Buzzell 70 Yd Interception, Aaron Paradis Kick (Husson 7–0)
- (10:09) UMD – Mike Vincent 3 Yd Pass, Douglas Chicca Kick (Tied 7–7)

Third quarter

- (9:35) UMD – Diondre Ellis 6 Yd Pass, Douglas Chicca PAT Failed (UMass Dartmouth 7–13)

Fourth quarter

- (11:19) HUS – Anthony Walker 10 Yd Pass, Aaron Paradis Kick (Husson 14–13)
- (1:48) UMD – Antonio Brown 39 Yd Pass, Dante Aviles-Santos 2PT Conversion (UMass Dartmouth 14–21)

Statistics	UMD	HUS
First downs	23	21
Plays–yards	72–334	74–354
Rushes–yards	113	73
Passing yards	221	281
Passing: comp–att–int	15–34–1	24–41–1
Time of possession	27:33	32:27

Team	Category	Player	Statistics
UMass Dartmouth	Passing	Dante Aviles-Santos	9/20, 128 yards, 2 TD
UMass Dartmouth	Rushing	Luis Gonzalez	19 carries, 55 yards
UMass Dartmouth	Receiving	Douglas Machado	4 receptions, 84 yards
Husson	Passing	Nic Vesser	24/41, 281 yards, 1 TD, 1 INT
Husson	Rushing	Jordan Marcano	11 carries, 54 yards
Husson	Receiving	Tyler Halls	6 receptions, 87 yards

=== Dean ===
Game Two – UMass Dartmouth Corsairs (1–0) vs Dean Bulldogs (1–0)

Quarter	1	2	3	4	Total
Dean	7	0	7	15	29
UMass Dartmouth	18	0	12	18	48

at Cressy Field • Dartmouth, Massachusetts

- Date: Saturday, September 11, 2021
- Game time: 12:00 p.m. EST
- Game weather: Sunny
- Game attendance: 1,008
- Referee: Chris Hadden

Game information

First quarter

- (13:25) UMD – Mike Vincent 41 Yd Pass, Douglas Chicca PAT Failed (UMass Dartmouth 6–0)
- (13:04) DEC – David Curry 61 Yd Run, Mason Dill Kick (Dean 6–7)
- (11:54) UMD – Antonio Brown 55 Yd Pass, Douglas Chicca PAT Failed (UMass Dartmouth 12–7)
- (8:11) UMD – Douglas Machado 78 Yd Pass, Douglas Chicca PAT Failed (UMass Dartmouth 18–7)

Second quarter

No Scoring

Third quarter

- (11:22) UMD – Dante Aviles-Santos 1 Yd Run, Douglas Chicca PAT Failed (UMass Dartmouth 24–7)
- (1:58) DEC – Jordan Mason 24 Yd Pass, Mason Dill Kick (UMass Dartmouth 24–14)
- (0:10) UMD – Thomas Zednik 14 Yd Pass, Douglas Chicca PAT Failed (UMass Dartmouth 30–14)

Fourth quarter

- (13:48) DEC – Ki'sean Bullard 44 Yd Pass, Quintus Reid 2PT Conversion (UMass Dartmouth 30–22)
- (11:27) UMD – Douglas Machado 9 Yd Pass, Douglas Chicca PAT Failed (UMass Dartmouth 36–22)
- (8:10) DEC – Quintus Reid 13 Yd Pass, Mason Dill Kick (UMass Dartmouth 36–29)
- (4:06) UMD – Marvens Jean 2 Yd Run, Douglas Chicca PAT Failed (UMass Dartmouth 42–29)
- (1:17) UMD – Luis Gonzalez 40 Yd Run, Douglas Chicca PAT Failed (UMass Dartmouth 48–29)

Statistics	DEC	UMD
First downs	21	26
Plays–yards	73–398	71–594
Rushes–yards	163	269
Passing yards	235	325
Passing: comp–att–int	25–48–2	15–29–0
Time of possession	27:16	32:42

Team	Category	Player	Statistics
Dean	Passing	Dante Aviles-Santos	15/29, 325 yards, 5 TD
Dean	Rushing	Luis Gonzalez	23 carries, 144 yards, 1 TD
Dean	Receiving	Douglas Machado	7 receptions, 196 yards, 2 TD
UMass Dartmouth	Passing	David Curry	25/48, 235 yards, 3 TD, 2 INT
UMass Dartmouth	Rushing	Mike Bethune Jr.	16 carries, 84 yards
UMass Dartmouth	Receiving	Jordan Mason	4 receptions, 99 yards, 1 TD

=== At Framingham State ===
Game Three – UMass Dartmouth Corsairs (2–0) vs Framingham State Rams (1–1)

Quarter	1	2	3	4	Total
UMass Dartmouth	7	0	0	14	21
Framingham State	14	10	14	7	45

at Bowditch Field • Framingham, Massachusetts

- Date: Saturday, September 18, 2021
- Game time: 1:00 p.m. EST
- Game attendance: 1,100

Game information

First quarter

- (13:47) UMD – Douglas Machado 57 Yd Pass, Douglas Chicca Kick (UMass Dartmouth 7–0)
- (3:44) FSU – Cole Moretti 42 Yd Fumble Recovery, Matthew Farley Kick (Tied 7–7)
- (0:06) FSU – Kareem Coleman 14 Yd Pass, Matthew Farley Kick (Framingham State 7–14)

Second quarter

- (9:47) FSU – Marcus McBean Jr. 21 Yd Run, Matthew Farley Kick (Framingham State 7–21)
- (2:15) FSU – Matthew Farley 23 Yd Field Goal (Framingham State 7–24)

Third quarter

- (7:40) FSU – Elijah Nichols 15 Yd Pass, Matthew Farley Kick (Framingham State 7–31)
- (1:15) FSU – Devaun Ford 3 Yd Run, Matthew Farley Kick (Framingham State 7–38)

Fourth quarter

- (14:48) UMD – Luis Gonzalez 20 Yd Pass, Douglas Chicca Kick (Framingham State 14–38)
- (8:39) FSU – Nicolas Goffredo 22 Yd Run, Matthew Farley Kick (Framingham State 14–45)
- (3:57) UMD – Marvens Jean 3 Yd Run, Douglas Chicca Kick (Framingham State 21–45)

Statistics	UMD	FSU
First downs	15	25
Plays–yards	61–299	80–439
Rushes–yards	84	273
Passing yards	215	166
Passing: comp–att–int	12–31–1	14–26–0
Time of possession	21:16	38:44

Team	Category	Player	Statistics
UMass Dartmouth	Passing	Dante Aviles-Santos	11/30, 195 yards, 1 TD, 1 INT
UMass Dartmouth	Rushing	Marvens Jean	6 carries, 48 yards, 1 TD
UMass Dartmouth	Receiving	Douglas Machado	2 receptions, 67 yards, 1 TD
Framingham State	Passing	Nicolas Goffredo	14/26, 166 yards, 2 TD
Framingham State	Rushing	Nicolas Goffredo	7 carries, 82 yards, 1 TD
Framingham State	Receiving	Elijah Nichols	8 receptions, 107 yards, 1 TD

=== Worcester State ===
Game Four – UMass Dartmouth Corsairs (2–1) vs Worcester State Lancers (1–2)

Quarter	1	2	3	4	Total
Worcester State	0	0	7	0	7
UMass Dartmouth	12	13	13	14	52

at Cressy Field • Dartmouth, Massachusetts

- Date: Saturday, September 25, 2021
- Game time: 12:00 p.m. EST
- Game weather: Sunny
- Game attendance: 1,025
- Referee: Gregg Camara

Game information

First quarter

- (11:42) UMD – Luis Gonzalez 6 Yd Run, Douglas Chicca PAT Failed (UMass Dartmouth 6–0)
- (4:02) UMD – Douglas Machado 25 Yd Pass, Douglas Chicca PAT Failed (UMass Dartmouth 12–0)

Second quarter

- (3:08) UMD – Luis Gonzalez 3 Yd Run, Douglas Chicca PAT Failed (UMass Dartmouth 18–0)
- (0:21) UMD – Marvens Jean 62 Yd Run, Douglas Chicca Kick (UMass Dartmouth 25–0)

Third quarter

- (9:41) WSU – Dylan Hall 1 Yd Pass, Kyle Wall Kick (UMass Dartmouth 25–7)
- (8:04) UMD – Douglas Machado 39 Yd Pass, Douglas Chicca PAT Failed (UMass Dartmouth 31–7)
- (0:22) UMD – Easten Coleman 12 Yd Pass, Douglas Chicca Kick (UMass Dartmouth 38–7)

Fourth quarter

- (9:51) UMD – Jayln Aponte 16 Yd Run, Douglas Chicca Kick (UMass Dartmouth 45–7)
- (1:48) UMD – Richarno Hylton 27 Yd Run, Douglas Chicca Kick (UMass Dartmouth 52–7)

Statistics	WSU	UMD
First downs	11	25
Plays–yards	62–191	67–537
Rushes–yards	40	372
Passing yards	151	165
Passing: comp–att–int	12–33–1	11–19–0
Time of possession	28:48	31:12

Team	Category	Player	Statistics
Worcester State	Passing	Aaron-Moses Williams	9/24, 113 yard, 1 INT
Worcester State	Rushing	Aaron-Moses Williams	14 carries, 21 yards
Worcester State	Receiving	Dylan McLaughlin	2 receptions, 36 yards
UMass Dartmouth	Passing	Dante Aviles-Santos	10/17, 146 yards, 3 TD
UMass Dartmouth	Rushing	Marvens Jean	10 carries, 137 yards, 1 TD
UMass Dartmouth	Receiving	Douglas Machado	4 receptions, 87 yards, 2 TD

=== At Western Connecticut ===
Game Five – UMass Dartmouth Corsairs (3–1) vs Western Connecticut Colonials (2–2)

Quarter	1	2	3	4	Total
UMass Dartmouth	6	7	0	6	19
Western Connecticut	0	21	6	7	34

at The WAC • Danbury, Connecticut

- Date: Saturday, October 2, 2021
- Game time: 5:00 p.m. EST
- Game weather: Temperature: 66 °F (19 °C) • Weather: Nice
- Game attendance: 888
- Referee: Mesnick M.

Game information

First quarter

- (6:06) UMD – Luis Gonzalez 1 Yd Run, Douglas Chicca PAT Failed (UMass Dartmouth 6–0)

Second quarter

- (14:57) UMD – Douglas Machado 10 Yd Pass, Douglas Chicca Kick (UMass Dartmouth 13–0)
- (10:53) WCSU – Mack Driver 3 Yd Run, Anthony Weidtman Kick (UMass Dartmouth 13–7)
- (7:25) WCSU – Mack Driver 17 Yd Run, Anthony Weidtman Kick (Western Connecticut 13–14)
- (2:32) WCSU – Chad Blaszky 16 Yd Run, Anthony Weidtman Kick (Western Connecticut 13–21)

Third quarter

- (8:22) WCSU – Mack Driver 18 Yd Run, Anthony Weidtman PAT Failed (Western Connecticut 13–27)

Fourth quarter

- (6:36) WCSU – Julian Ferguson 15 Yd Pass, Anthony Weidtman Kick (Western Connecticut 13–34)
- (2:43) UMD – Dante Aviles-Santos 2 Yd Run, Douglas Chicca PAT Failed (Western Connecticut 19–34)

Statistics	UMD	WCSU
First downs	24	25
Plays–yards	71–307	66–377
Rushes–yards	138	337
Passing yards	169	40
Passing: comp–att–int	16–28–0	4–8–0
Time of possession	26:38	33:22

Team	Category	Player	Statistics
UMass Dartmouth	Passing	Dante Aviles-Santos	16/28, 169 yards, 1 TD
UMass Dartmouth	Rushing	Luis Gonzalez	22 carries, 75 yards, 1 TD
UMass Dartmouth	Receiving	Douglas Machado	6 receptions, 69 yards, 1 TD
Western Connecticut	Passing	John Giller	4/8, 40 yards, 1 TD
Western Connecticut	Rushing	Chad Blaszky	28 carries, 149 yards, 1 TD
Western Connecticut	Receiving	Messiah Diggs	2 receptions, 27 yards

=== Massachusetts Maritime ===
Game Six – UMass Dartmouth Corsairs (3–2) vs Massachusetts Maritime Buccaneers (3–1)

Quarter	1	2	3	4	Total
Massachusetts Maritime	0	3	7	0	10
UMass Dartmouth	6	6	8	6	26

at Cressy Field • Dartmouth, Massachusetts

- Date: Saturday, October 9, 2021
- Game time: 2:30 p.m. EST
- Game weather: Sunny
- Game attendance: 1,562
- Referee: Joe Smith

Game information

First quarter

- (4:21) UMD – Luis Gonzalez 2 Yd Pass, Douglas Chicca PAT Failed (UMass Dartmouth 6–0)

Second quarter

- (10:26) MMA – George Lampros 20 Yd Field Goal (UMass Dartmouth 6–3)
- (0:56) UMD – Dante Aviles-Santos 3 Yd Pass, Douglas Chicca PAT Failed (UMass Dartmouth 12–3)

Third quarter

- (5:25) UMD – Antonio Brown 49 Yd Pass, Antonio Brown Pass (UMass Dartmouth 20–3)
- (3:40) MMA – Jonah Mitchell 33 Yd Pass, George Lampros Kick (UMass Dartmouth 20–10)

Fourth quarter

- (7:46) UMD – Marvens Jean 6 Yd Run, Douglas Chicca PAT Failed (UMass Dartmouth 26–10)

Statistics	MMA	UMD
First downs	8	23
Plays–yards	61–150	85–363
Rushes–yards	48	114
Passing yards	102	249
Passing: comp–att–int	10–30–3	20–39–2
Time of possession	24:31	35:29

Team	Category	Player	Statistics
Massachusetts Maritime	Passing	Curtis Cann	4/20, 87 yards, 1 TD, 2 INT
Massachusetts Maritime	Rushing	Jonah Mitchell	7 carries, 22 yards
Massachusetts Maritime	Receiving	Andrew Brightman	2 receptions, 46 yards
UMass Dartmouth	Passing	Dante Aviles-Santos	14/28, 198 yards, 1 TD, 1 INT
UMass Dartmouth	Rushing	Luis Gonzalez	18 carries, 61 yards
UMass Dartmouth	Receiving	Luis Gonzalez	6 receptions, 53 yards, 1 TD

=== At Westfield State ===
Game Seven – UMass Dartmouth Corsairs (4–2) vs Westfield State Owls (0–5)

Quarter	1	2	3	4	Total
UMass Dartmouth	6	0	0	20	26
Westfield State	2	14	0	0	16

at Alumni Field • Westfield, Massachusetts

- Date: Saturday, October 16, 2021
- Game time: 2:00 p.m. EST
- Game weather: Temperature: 72 °F (22 °C) • Weather: Clear
- Game attendance: 1,500
- Referee: John Rauseo

Game information

First quarter

- (10:21) UMD – Marvens Jean 31 Yd Pass, Aviles-Santos Pass Intercepted (UMass Dartmouth 6–0)
- (10:21) WSU – Cameron Danahy 98 PAT Interception Return (UMass Dartmouth 6–2)

Second quarter

- (14:43) WSU – Christian Julian 75 Yd Punt Return, Anthony Cintron Run 2PT Conversion (Westfield State 6–10)
- (0:19) WSU – Anthony Cintron 24 Yd Pass, Shane Clark Run 2PT Conversion Failed (Westfield State 6–16)

Third quarter

No scoring

Fourth quarter

- (11:38) UMD – Dante Aviles-Santos 13 Yd Run, Matt Gacioch Pass 2PT Failed (Westfield State 12–16)
- (7:56) UMD – Luis Gonzales 73 Yd Run, Keenan Little Pass 2PT Conversion (UMass Dartmouth 20–16)
- (4:36) UMD – Antonio Brown 40 Yd Pass, Dante Aviles-Santos Pass 2PT Conversion Failed (UMass Dartmouth 26–16)

Statistics	UMD	WSU
First downs	21	14
Plays–yards	66–445	62–173
Rushes–yards	222	93
Passing yards	223	80
Passing: comp–att–int	15–25–0	10–23–3
Time of possession	28:32	31:28

Team	Category	Player	Statistics
UMass Dartmouth	Passing	Dante Aviles-Santos	14/20, 227 yards, 2 TD
UMass Dartmouth	Rushing	Luis Gonzalez	14 carries, 124 yards, 1 TD
UMass Dartmouth	Receiving	Antonio Brown	4 receptions, 77 yards, 1 TD
Westfield State	Passing	Peyton Capizzi	10/23, 80 yards, 1 TD, 3 INT
Westfield State	Rushing	Shane Clark	14 carries, 51 yards
Westfield State	Receiving	Anthony Cintron	2 receptions, 35 yards, 1 TD

=== Fitchburg State ===
Game Eight – UMass Dartmouth Corsairs (5–2) vs Fitchburg State Falcons (0–7)

Quarter	1	2	3	4	Total
Fitchburg State	0	0	0	0	0
UMass Dartmouth	8	18	8	6	40

at Cressy Field • Dartmouth, Massachusetts

- Date: Saturday, October 23, 2021
- Game time: 3:30 p.m. EST
- Game weather: Sunny
- Game attendance: 1,023
- Referee: Mike Lee

Game information

First quarter

- (3:38) UMD – Dante Aviles-Santos 24 Yd Run, Thomas Zednik Pass 2PT Conversion (UMass Dartmouth 8–0)

Second quarter

- (10:45) UMD – Luis Gonzalez 7 Yd Run, PAT Failed (UMass Dartmouth 14–0)
- (7:17) UMD – Dante Aviles-Santos 14 Yd Run, PAT Failed (UMass Dartmouth 20–0)
- (0:42) UMD – Luis Gonzalez 15 Yd Pass, PAT Failed (UMass Dartmouth 26–0)

Third quarter

- (5:45) UMD – Marvens Jean 33 Yd Run, Thomas Zednik Pass 2PT Conversion (UMass Dartmouth 34–0)

Fourth quarter

- (8:58) UMD – Richarno Hylton 51 Yd Run, PAT Failed (UMass Dartmouth 40–0)

Statistics	FSU	UMD
First downs	9	31
Plays–yards	53–145	76–597
Rushes–yards	83	427
Passing yards	62	170
Passing: comp–att–int	4–9–1	16–28–0
Time of possession	29:42	30:18

Team	Category	Player	Statistics
Fitchburg State	Passing	Joseph Haskins	3/8, 61 yards, 1 INT
Fitchburg State	Rushing	Frank Sims, IV	11 carries, 39 yards
Fitchburg State	Receiving	Gabriel Mangrum	2 receptions, 57 yards
UMass Dartmouth	Passing	Dante Aviles-Santos	14/24, 140 yards
UMass Dartmouth	Rushing	Marvens Jean	15 carries, 173 yards, 1 TD
UMass Dartmouth	Receiving	Mike Vincent	5 receptions, 46 yards

=== At Bridgewater State ===
Game Nine – UMass Dartmouth Corsairs (6–2) vs Bridgewater State Bears (5–2)

Quarter	1	2	3	4	Total
UMass Dartmouth	8	6	6	6	26
Bridgewater State	12	8	0	0	20

at Swenson Field • Bridgewater, Massachusetts

- Date: Saturday, October 30, 2021
- Game time: 12:00 p.m. EST
- Game weather: Temperature: 60 °F (16 °C) • Weather: Rain
- Game attendance: 850
- Referee: Joseph Bollus

Game information

First quarter

- (9:19) BSU – Adam Couch 1 Yd Run, Thomas Fay PAT Failed (Bridgewater State 6–0)
- (5:32) UMD – Douglas Machado 42 Yd Pass, Luis Gonzalez Run 2PT Conversion (UMass Dartmouth 6–8)
- (3:06) BSU – Adam Couch 33 Yd Run, Thomas Fay PAT Failed (Bridgewater State 12–8)

Second quarter

- (14:40) UMD – Keenan Little 2 Yd Pass, Marvens Jean Run 2PT Conversion Failed (UMass Dartmouth 12–14)
- (2:49) BSU – Adam Couch 25 Yd Run, T.J. Hairston Pass 2PT Conversion (Bridgewater State 20–14)

Third quarter

- (9:43) UMD – Marvens Jean 7 Yd Pass, Marvens Jean Run 2PT Conversion Failed (Tied 20–20)

Fourth quarter

- (13:58) UMD – Douglas Machado 18 Yd Pass, Dante Aviles-Santos Run 2PT Conversion Failed (UMass Dartmouth 20–26)

Statistics	UMD	BSU
First downs	22	20
Plays–yards	73–453	70–304
Rushes–yards	217	155
Passing yards	236	149
Passing: comp–att–int	16–25–0	15–34–2
Time of possession	31:54	28:06

Team	Category	Player	Statistics
UMass Dartmouth	Passing	Dante Aviles-Santos	16/25, 236 yards, 4 TD
UMass Dartmouth	Rushing	Marvens Jean	10 carries, 84 yards
UMass Dartmouth	Receiving	Douglas Machado	6 receptions, 84 yards, 2 TD
Bridgewater State	Passing	James Cahoon	15/34, 149 yards, 2 INT
Bridgewater State	Rushing	Adam Couch	22 carries, 151 yards, 3 TD
Bridgewater State	Receiving	T.J. Hairston	4 receptions, 61 yards

=== Plymouth State ===
Game Ten – UMass Dartmouth Corsairs (7–2) vs Plymouth State Panthers (5–4)

Quarter	1	2	3	4	Total
Plymouth State	0	0	0	7	7
UMass Dartmouth	8	12	0	8	28

at Cressy Field • Dartmouth, Massachusetts

- Date: Saturday, November 13, 2021
- Game time: 12:00 p.m. EST
- Game weather: Sunny
- Game attendance: 1,113
- Referee: Chris Hadden

Game information

First quarter

- (8:21) UMD – Dante Aviles-Santos 4 Yd Run, Thomas Zednik Pass 2PT Conversion (UMass Dartmouth 8–0)

Second quarter

- (11:18) UMD – Douglas Machado 5 Yd Pass, PAT Failed (UMass Dartmouth 14–0)
- (9:29) UMD – Marvens Jean 9 Yd Pass, PAT Failed (UMass Dartmouth 20–0)

Third quarter

No scoring

Fourth quarter

- (11:21) UMD – Luis Gonzalez 1 Yd Run, Keenan Little Pass 2PT Conversion (UMass Dartmouth 28–0)
- (0:15) PSU – Manny Sanchez 3 Yd Run, Dan Carey Kick (UMass Dartmouth 28–7)

Statistics	PSU	UMD
First downs	13	17
Plays–yards	61–154	61–329
Rushes–yards	124	212
Passing yards	30	117
Passing: comp–att–int	6–15–0	14–20–0
Time of possession	28:17	31:43

Team	Category	Player	Statistics
Plymouth State	Passing	Brett Lavanchy	6/15, 30 yards
Plymouth State	Rushing	Manny Sanchez	34 carries, 141 yards, 1 TD
Plymouth State	Receiving	Gavin Moody	2 receptions, 16 yards
UMass Dartmouth	Passing	Dante Aviles-Santos	14/20, 117 yards, 2 TD
UMass Dartmouth	Rushing	Dante Aviles-Santos	10 carries, 75 yards, 1 TD
UMass Dartmouth	Receiving	Marvens Jean	6 receptions, 78 yards, 1 TD

=== Alfred State ===
Game Eleven – UMass Dartmouth Corsairs (8–2) vs Alfred State Pioneers (6–4)

Quarter	1	2	3	4	Total
Alfred State	3	0	13	0	16
UMass Dartmouth	16	6	12	8	42

at Cressy Field • Dartmouth, Massachusetts

- Date: Saturday, November 20, 2021
- Game time: 1:00 p.m. EST
- Game weather: Sunny
- Game attendance: 2,120
- Referee: Ronnie Patry

Game information

First quarter

- (11:56) UMD – Dante Aviles-Santos 3 Yd Run, Luis Gonzalez Run 2PT Conversion (UMass Dartmouth 8–0)
- (5:36) UMD – Antonio Brown 43 Yd Pass, Thomas Zednik Pass 2PT Conversion (UMass Dartmouth 16–0)
- (0:25) ASC – Dawson Fontaine 0 Yd Field Goal (UMass Dartmouth 16–3)

Second quarter

- (2:48) UMD – Keenan Little 22 Yd Pass, PAT Failed (UMass Dartmouth 22–3)

Third quarter

- (12:53) ASC – Roman Napoleon 13 Yd Pass, PAT Failed (UMass Dartmouth 22–9)
- (10:14) UMD – Tyler Gmyr 0 Yd Pass, PAT Failed (UMass Dartmouth 28–9)
- (7:21) UMD – Dante Aviles-Santos 5 Yd Run, PAT Failed (UMass Dartmouth 34–9)
- (5:10) ASC – Jake Palmer 2 Yd Run, Dawson Fontaine Kick (UMass Dartmouth 34–16)

Fourth quarter

- (10:15) UMD – Winston DeLeon 8 Yd Pass, Mike Vincent Pass 2PT Conversion (UMass Dartmouth 42–16)

Statistics	ASC	UMD
First downs	12	29
Plays–yards	57–278	91–621
Rushes–yards	63	303
Passing yards	215	318
Passing: comp–att–int	11–31–2	16–30–2
Time of possession	23:52	36:08

Team	Category	Player	Statistics
Alfred State	Passing	Aaron Jenkins	11/31, 215 yards, 1 TD, 2 INT
Alfred State	Rushing	Aaron Jenkins	22 carries, 72 yards
Alfred State	Receiving	Shy'rel Broadwater	5 receptions, 98 yards
UMass Dartmouth	Passing	Dante Aviles-Santos	15/28, 316 yards, 4 TD, 2 INT
UMass Dartmouth	Rushing	Marvens Jean	19 carries, 129 yards
UMass Dartmouth	Receiving	Douglas Machado	5 receptions, 151 yards

== Personnel ==
=== Coaching staff ===
Name	Position
Mark Robichaud	Head coach
Steve Faniel	Defensive coordinator/defensive back coach
Andrew Gacioch	Defensive line coach
Ryan McCormack	Associate head coach/Running backs coach/Recruiting coordinator
John Gendron	Linebackers coach
Josh Sylvester	Offensive coordinator/quarterbacks coach
Ryan Struthers	Wide receivers coach/special teams coordinator
Justin Borden	Offensive line coach
Andrew Brown	Defensive back coach
Stephen Gacioch	Student assistant coach

=== Roster ===
2021 UMass Dartmouth Corsairs Football
Quarterbacks: 2 – Matt Gacioch – freshman (6'3, 195); 6 – Dante Aviles-Santos – sophomore (6'1, 180); Running backs: 4 – Luis Gonzalez – junior (6'1, 225); 9 – Marvens Jean – freshman (6'0, 225); 20 – Jalyn Aponte – freshman (5'10, 200); 24 – Shyne Fernandes – freshman (5'9, 190); 31 – Aaron Perez – freshman (6'1, 205); 35 – Richarno Hylton – sophomore (5'8, 180); 37 – Khadir Green – junior (5'6, 175); Wide receivers: 8 – Douglas Machado – 5th (5'10, 175); 10 – Diondre Ellis – junior (6'0, 180); 12 – Winston DeLeon – junior (5'10, 200); 14 – Paul Osayande – senior (6'2, 180); 16 – DeJuan Hayes – sophomore (5'9, 175); 17 – Easten Coleman – freshman (6'0, 185); 18 – Anontio Brown – freshman (6'2, 185); 19 – Keenan Little – senior (6'4, 200); 41 – Nate Upchurch – sophomore (5'9, 175); 46 – Jonathan Brightman – freshman (6'1, 180); 80 – Malakie Simao – sophomore (6'2, 175); 81 – Mike Vincent – freshman (6'2, 180); 82 – Wayman Jenkins – junior (6'0, 205); 83 – Cade Rutkowski – junior (6'2, 170); 84 – Zack Leo – junior (5'10, 175); 85 – Thomas Zednik – freshman (6'5, 210); 86 – Clinton Maleski – sophomore (6'3, 205); 87 – Isaiah Cole – sophomore (5'10, 175); 88 – Jaydon Pearson – freshman (5'11, 170); 89 – Owen Quigley – freshman (6'0, 175)	Tight ends: 65 – Collin Farr – freshman (6'7, 260); Offensive linemen: 50 – Colby Fenton – sophomore (6'1, 235); 53 – Joe Paulo – sophomore (5'11, 230); 56 – Sai Hallums – sophomore (6'0, 290); 61 – Nick Richard – freshman (6'2, 235); 62 – Kolby Stockwell – freshman (6'3, 280); 63 – Liam Whaley – junior (6'1, 285); 66 – Adam Boulrisse – senior (5'11, 255); 68 – Henry Doane – sophomore (6'2, 260); 70 – Pat Matarese – freshman (6'4, 270); 72 – Brandon DiChiaro – junior (6'3, 290); 73 – Andrew Paulus – senior (6'1, 265); 74 – Tyler Gmyr – freshman (6'5, 300); 75 – Carlos Goncalves-Robalo – junior (6'1, 310); 78 – Saih Hill-Gore – junior (6'1, 260)	Defensive linemen: 0 – Matt Gisonno – senior (6'5, 225); 40 – Kyle Kauzens – senior (6'1, 205); 48 – Josh Lacerte – junior (6'0, 210); 51 – Mekhi Geter – senior (6'1, 250); 58 – Woodley Felix – freshman (6'4, 200); 64 – Ryan Rego – sophomore (6'1, 230); 77 – Marcus Elysee – graduate (6'2, 270); 91 – Teshuah Williams – freshman (5'11, 230); 93 – Sean Reall – 5th (6'4, 225); 96 – Magnus Hartz – freshman (6'0, 195); 97 – Justin Nortelus – freshman (6'2, 220); 98 – Cam Junes – freshman (6'1, 225); Linebackers: 5 – Javien Delgado – senior (5'11, 225); 25 – Malik Gibson – senior (6'2, 185); 32 – Mike Henricksen – freshman (6'1, 220); 34 – Dave Silvia – sophomore (6'1, 220); 43 – Ty Couto – junior (5'11, 200); 44 – Jackson Wellman – sophomore (6'2, 220); 45 – Sam Alicea – freshman (6'0, 210); 47 – Douglas Chicca – sophomore (5'9, 205); 49 – Jaydon Lame – sophomore (5'11, 210); 52 – Anthony Durante – sophomore (5'11, 185); 55 – Randy Jean-Francois – sophomore (5'10, 225); 59 – Daniel Chalghin – freshman (6'0, 210); 60 – Connor Richard – sophomore (5'11, 180); 92 – Jacob Silva – freshman (5'11, 185); 95 – Nick Eckstrom – sophomore (6'1, 225); 99 – Bobby Reynolds – junior (5'11, 210)	Defensive backs: 1 – Chris Gomes – 5th (5'11, 180); 3 – Adam Washington – senior (6'3, 205); 7 – JP Mason – senior (6'1, 175); 13 – Trell Best – sophomore (5'9, 185); 21 – Stevie Kolodko – junior (6'1, 180); 22 – Isaiah Price – freshman (5'9, 180); 23 – Tyrique Dasilva – junior (5'8, 175); 26 – Michael Koussa – freshman (5'11, 170); 27 – Logan Chappell – sophomore (6'1, 185); 28 – Will Tuttle – junior (5'8, 170); 29 – Mohamed Jalloh – freshman (5'11, 190); 30 – Shane Meerbott – sophomore (6'1, 180); 33 – Gee Napoleon – senior (5'10, 185); 36 – Fernando Aguilar – junior (5'10, 180); 38 – Connor Donohue – junior (5'9, 175); 39 – Walter Lazare – junior (5'10, 180); 42 – Collin Harrison – sophomore (6'1, 180); 90 – Alex Cruz – freshman (5'9, 180)
Source and player details, 2021 UMass Dartmouth Corsairs (11/5/2022):

== Statistics ==
=== Team ===
	UMass Dartmouth	Opp
Scoring	349	198
Points per game	31.7	18.0
First downs	256	179
Rushing	134	92
Passing	105	71
Penalty	17	16
Rushing yards	2,471	1,452
Avg per play	5.1	3.4
Avg per game	224.6	132.0
Rushing touchdowns	23	13
Passing yards	2,408	1,511
Att–Comp–Int	308–166–6	298–135–15
Avg per pass	7.8	5.1
Avg per game	218.9	137.4
Passing touchdowns	30	11
Total offense	4,879	2,192
Avg per game	443.5	269.4
Fumbles–Lost	13–10	14–7
Penalties–Yards	64–639	63–507
Avg per game	58.1	46.1

	UMass Dartmouth	Opp
Punts–Yards	44–1,545	52–1,857
Avg per punt	30.4	34.8
Time of possession/Game	29:24	29:41
3rd down conversions	77–156	63–160
4th down conversions	17–30	12–33
Touchdowns scored	53	27
Field goals–Attempts	0–0	3–7
PAT–Attempts	9–18	18–22

=== Individual leaders ===
==== Offense ====
Passing statistics
#	NAME	POS	RAT	CMP	ATT	YDS	AVG/G	CMP%	TD	INT	LONG
6	Dante Aviles-Santos	QB	151.32	148	269	2,197	199.7	55.0%	25	4	78
2	Matt Gacioch	QB	71.88	6	16	50	4.55	37.5%	1	1	23
11	Stephen Gacioch	QB	116.25	6	13	93	93.0	46.2%	1	1	32
19	Keenan Little	WR	186.48	3	5	36	3.27	60.0%	1	0	19
10	Diondre Ellis	WR	299.00	1	2	20	3.33	50.0%	1	0	20
81	Mike Vincent	WR	455.20	1	1	3	0.27	100.0%	1	0	3
	TOTALS		147.73	165	307	2,399	218.1	53.75%	30	6	78

Rushing statistics
#	NAME	POS	ATT	YDS	AVG	TD	LONG
4	Luis Gonzalex	RB	207	964	4.7	7	73
9	Marvens Jean	RB	119	901	7.6	5	62
6	Dante Aviles-Santos	QB	94	299	3.2	8	26
35	Richarno Hylton	RB	8	104	13.0	2	51
20	Jalyn Aponte	RB	18	98	5.4	1	16
2	Matt Gacioch	QB	9	59	5.7	0	19
24	Shyne Fernandes	RB	5	43	8.6	0	25
11	Stephen Gacioch	QB	6	19	3.2	0	14
31	Aaron Perez	RB	3	14	4.7	0	9
37	Khadir Green	RB	1	5	5.0	0	5
8	Douglas Machado	WR	1	0	0.0	0	0
19	Keenan Little	WR	1	-6	-6.0	0	-6
	TOTALS		486	2,471	5.1	23	73

Receiving statistics
#	NAME	POS	CTH	YDS	AVG	TD	LONG
8	Douglas Machado	WR	38	759	20.0	9	78
18	Antonio Brown	WR	17	394	23.2	5	55
81	Mike Vincent	WR	25	346	13.8	2	41
9	Marvens Jean	RB	18	229	12.7	3	36
19	Keenan Little	WR	20	200	10.0	2	31
17	Easten Coleman	WR	14	166	11.9	1	28
4	Luis Gonzalez	RB	15	150	10.0	3	45
85	Thomas Zednik	WR	4	62	15.5	1	30
12	Winston DeLeon	WR	3	39	13.0	1	20
15	Eric Woodbury	WR	2	33	16.5	0	23
10	Diondre Ellis	WR	5	29	5.8	1	11
46	Jonathan Brightman	WR	1	15	15.0	0	15
6	Dante Aviles-Santos	QB	2	5	2.5	1	3
87	Isaiah Cole	WR	1	1	1.0	0	1
74	Tyler Gmyr	OL	0	0	NaN	0	1
	TOTALS		165	2,428	14.7	30	78

==== Special teams ====
Punting statistics
#	NAME	POS	PUNTS	AVG	LONG	YDS
2	Matt Gacioch	P	44	35.1	49	1,545
	TOTALS		44	35.1	49	1,545
