= Golden Bear Stadium =

Sports facility in Springfield, Massachusetts

Coordinates: 42.112718°N 72.513384°W

- Interactive map of Golden Bear Stadium
- Location: 1215 Wilbraham Road; Springfield, MA 01119
- Owner: Western New England University
- Operator: Western New England University
- Capacity: 1,500

Construction
- Opened: September 2002

Tenant
- Western New England University (NCAA) 2002-Present

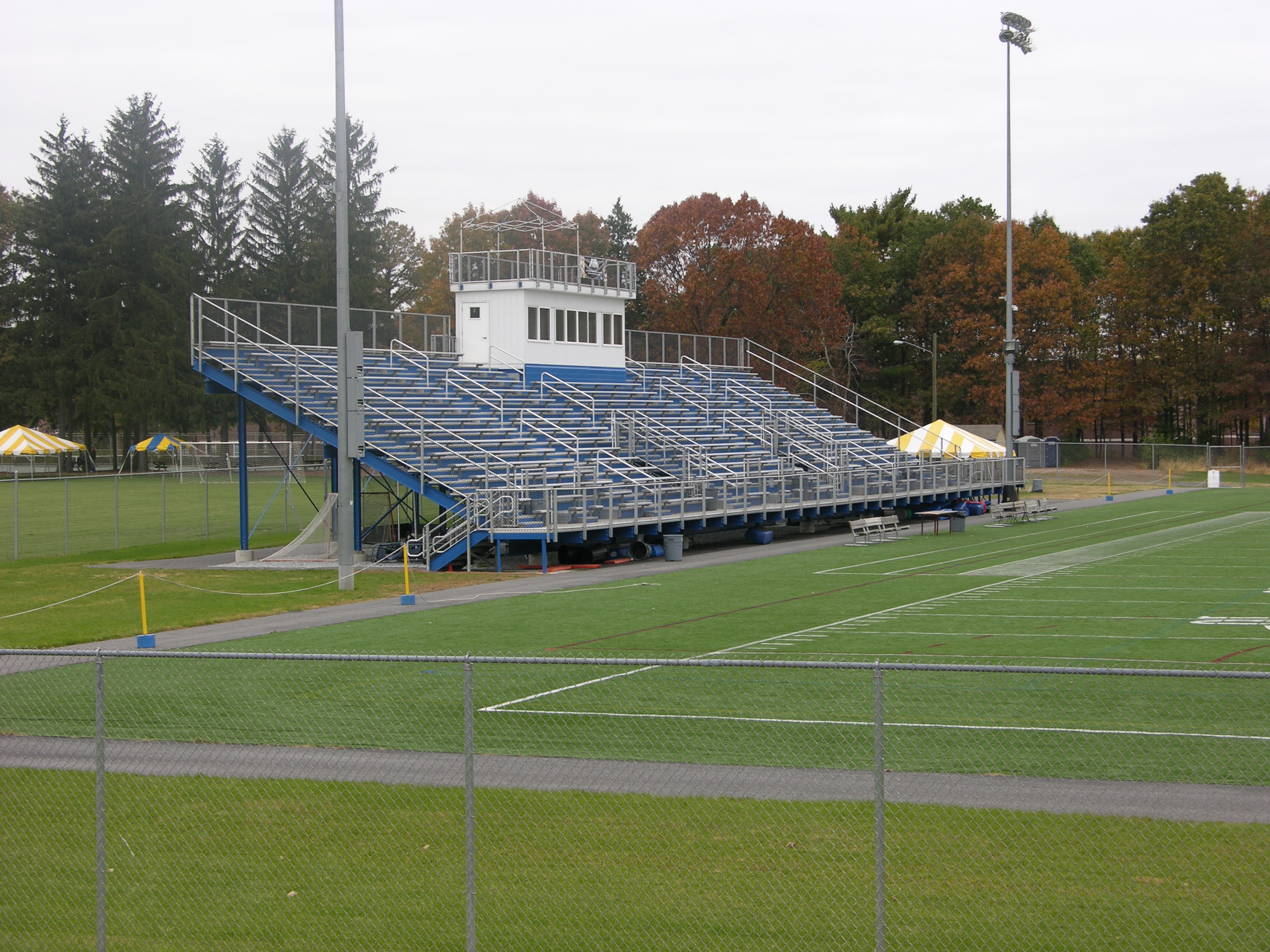
Golden Bear Stadium

Golden Bear Stadium is a multipurpose outdoor sports facility on the campus of Western New England University in Springfield, Massachusetts. It features a synthetic turf field. The 1,500-seat stadium serves as the home field for Western New England University's football, field hockey, and men's and women's lacrosse teams.

Western New England University's football and lacrosse teams previously played their contests on the game field located near the St. Germain Campus Center. The field hockey team played its events on a grass surface at Suprenant Field.

== Memorable moments ==
- October 31, 2006 - Field hockey team defeats Simmons College, 2-1, in a semifinal match of the North Atlantic Conference (NAC) Tournament. It was the final varsity athletic event held at Golden Bear Stadium for Western New England under the auspices of the NAC.
- May 5, 2007 - Women's lacrosse defeats Worcester State College, 14-10, in the championship game of the New England Women's Lacrosse Alliance (NEWLA) Tournament. It was the final varsity athletic event held at Golden Bear Stadium for Western New England under the auspices of the NEWLA.
- May 5, 2007 - Men's lacrosse defeats Springfield College, 8-6, in the championship game of the Pilgrim League Tournament. It was the final varsity athletic event held at Golden Bear Stadium for Western New England under the auspices of the Pilgrim League.
- May 12, 2007 - The Western New England men's lacrosse team hosts a second-round game of the NCAA Division III Tournament at Golden Bear Stadium, defeating Keene State 13-5. This is the first NCAA Tournament event in any sport to be held at Western New England University.
- May 16, 2007 - The Western New England men's lacrosse team hosts a quarterfinal game of the NCAA Division III Tournament at Golden Bear Stadium, losing to Cortland State 12-10.
- September 26, 2007 - Field hockey team defeats Endicott College, 3-2, in the first varsity athletic event held at Golden Bear Stadium for Western New England under the auspices of The Commonwealth Coast Conference (TCCC).
- May 7, 2008 - Men's lacrosse team defeats Western Connecticut State University, 14-4, in the first round of the 2008 NCAA Division III Men's Lacrosse Championship.
- May 2, 2009 - Men's lacrosse team defeats Endicott College, 12-7, to win TCCC Championship and earn an automatic berth to the 2009 NCAA Division III Men's Lacrosse Championship.
- November 7, 2009 - Football team ends it most successful season ever with a 31-10 victory over Nichols College. The Football team ended the year with a 6-4 mark, setting a school record for wins in a season to date.
- August 10, 2010 - New FieldTurf installed at Golden Bear Stadium
- November 20, 2010 - Football team participates in and wins the program's first postseason contest with a 66-41 victory over Maine Maritime in the Eastern College Athletic Conference (ECAC) North Central Bowl Championship. The win caps the most successful in program history as the Golden Bears finished with a school record 9-2 mark and tied for first in the New England Football Conference Boyd Division with a 6-1 conference record.
- August 2011 - New LED Scoreboard and Play Clock systems installed at Stadium.
- November 12, 2011 - Football team defeats Framingham State University 20-13 (OT) to win the program's first ever New England Football Conference championship. With the victory, the football team qualified for the NCAA Division III Football Championship for the first time in school history.
