= 2024 UMass Dartmouth Corsairs football team =

American college football season

2024 UMass Dartmouth Corsairs football

MASCAC champion

NCAA Division III Second Round, L 27–54 vs. Springfield
- Conference: Massachusetts State Collegiate Athletic Conference
- Record: 10–1 (9–0 MASCAC)
- Head coach: Josh Sylvester (2nd season)
- Offensive coordinator: Ryan Struthers (2nd season)
- Defensive coordinator: Steve Faniel (17th season)
- Home stadium: Cressy Field

2024 Massachusetts State Collegiate Athletic Conference football standings
	Conf.			Overall
Team	W		L	W		L
UMass Dartmouth $^	9	–	0	10	–	1
Western Connecticut	8	–	1	9	–	2
Plymouth State	5	–	4	5	–	4
Bridgewater State	5	–	4	5	–	5
Massachusetts Maritime	5	–	4	5	–	5
Westfield State	4	–	5	4	–	6
Framingham State	3	–	6	3	–	7
Worcester State	3	–	6	3	–	7
Castleton	2	–	7	3	–	7
Fitchburg State	1	–	8	2	–	8
$ – Conference champion; ^ – NCAA Division III playoff participant

The 2024 UMass Dartmouth Corsairs football team represent the University of Massachusetts Dartmouth as a member of the Massachusetts State Collegiate Athletic Conference (MASCAC) during the 2024 NCAA Division III football season. Led by second-year head coach Josh Sylvester, the Corsairs played home games at Cressy Field in Dartmouth, Massachusetts.

== Schedule ==
Date	Time	Opponent	Site	TV	Result	Attendance	Source
September 7	4:00 p.m.	Nichols*	Cressy Field; Dartmouth, MA		W 64–24		
September 14	12:00 p.m.	at Fitchburg State	Elliot Field; Fitchburg, MA		W 73–7	850	
September 20	7:00 p.m.	Framingham State	Cressy Field; Dartmouth, MA		W 58–13	561	
September 28	12:00 p.m.	Castleton	Cressy Field; Dartmouth, MA		W 60–10	563	
October 4	7:00 p.m.	at Massachusetts Maritime	Clean Harbors Stadium; Buzzards Bay, MA		W 34–0		
October 19	12:00 p.m.	at Worcester State	John Coughlin Field; Worcester, MA		W 58–7	757	
October 26	1:00 p.m.	Bridgewater State	Cressy Field; Dartmouth, MA		W 51–7	1,089	
November 2	3:00 p.m.	Western Connecticut	Cressy Field; Dartmouth, MA		W 41–30	1,127	
November 9	12:00 p.m.	at Westfield State	Alumni Field; Westfield, MA		W 56–14	1,275	
November 16	12:00 p.m.	at Plymouth State	Panther Field; Plymouth, NH		W 47–42	1,016	
November 30	12:00 p.m.	at No. 23 Springfield*	Stagg Field; Springfield, MA (NCAA Division III Second Round)	ESPN+	L 27–54	2,225	
*Non-conference game; Rankings from D3 Poll released prior to the game; All times are in Eastern time
