= 2023 UMass Dartmouth Corsairs football team =

American college football season

2023 UMass Dartmouth Corsairs football

MASCAC co-champion

New England Bowl, L 7–37 vs. Western New England
- Conference: Massachusetts State Collegiate Athletic Conference
- Record: 9–2 (7–1 MASCAC)
- Head coach: Josh Sylvester (1st season)
- Offensive coordinator: Ryan Struthers (1st season)
- Defensive coordinator: Steve Faniel (16th season)
- Home stadium: Cressy Field

2023 Massachusetts State Collegiate Athletic Conference football standings
	Conf.			Overall
Team	W		L	W		L
UMass Dartmouth +	7	–	1	9	–	2
Bridgewater State +	7	–	1	7	–	3
Western Connecticut +^	7	–	1	7	–	3
Framingham State	5	–	3	5	–	4
Plymouth State	4	–	4	4	–	6
Westfield State	3	–	5	3	–	7
Massachusetts Maritime	2	–	6	2	–	8
Worcester State	1	–	7	1	–	9
Fitchburg State	0	–	8	0	–	10
+ – Conference co-champions; ^ – NCAA Division III playoff participant

The 2023 UMass Dartmouth Corsairs football team represented the University of Massachusetts Dartmouth as a member of the Massachusetts State Collegiate Athletic Conference (MASCAC) during the 2023 NCAA Division III football season. Led by first-year head coach Josh Sylvester, the Corsairs compiled an overall record of 9–2 with a mark of 7–1 in conference play, sharing the MASCAC title with Bridgewater State and Western Connecticut. UMass Dartmouthwas invited to the New England Bowl, where the Corsairs lost to Western New England. The team played home games at Cressy Field in Dartmouth, Massachusetts.

== Schedule ==
Date	Time	Opponent	Site	TV	Result	Attendance
September 1	6:00 p.m.	at Nichols*	Michael Vendetti Field; Dudley, MA		W 57–6	564
September 9	5:00 p.m.	Curry*	Cressy Field; Dartmouth, MA		W 28–14	2,788
September 16	12:00 p.m.	at Framingham State	Bowditch Field; Framingham, MA		W 33–7	800
September 23	12:00 p.m.	Worcester State	Cressy Field; Dartmouth, MA	LEC Network	W 59–0	300
September 30	5:00 p.m.	at Western Connecticut	The WAC; Danbury, CT		L 21–52	
October 6	7:00 p.m.	Massachusetts Maritime	Cressy Field; Dartmouth, MA		W 26–0	
October 14	TBA	at Westfield State	Alumni Field; Westfield, MA		W 26–23	
October 21	4:00 p.m.	Fitchburg State	Cressy Field; Dartmouth, MA	LEC Network	W 42–7	
October 28	12:00 p.m.	at Bridgewater State	Swenson Field; Bridgewater, MA		W 48–7	
November 11	12:00 p.m.	Plymouth State	Cressy Field; Dartmouth, MA	LEC Network	W 41–7	
November 18	12:00 p.m.	at Western New England	Golden Bear Stadium; Springfield, MA (New England Bowl)		L 3–37	2,524
*Non-conference game; All times are in Eastern time

== Game summaries ==
=== At Nichols ===
Game One – UMass Dartmouth Corsairs (0–0) vs Nichols Bison (0–0)

Quarter	1	2	3	4	Total
UMass Dartmouth	7	29	14	7	57
Nichols	0	0	0	6	6

at Vendetti Field • Dudley, Massachusetts

- Date: Saturday, September 2, 2023
- Game time: 6:00 P.M. EST
- Game weather: Sunny
- Game attendance: 564
- Referee: Chris Hadden

Game information

First quarter

- (6:22) UMD – Angel Sanchez 54-yard pass from Dante Aviles-Santos, Braedyn DeMarco kick (Drive: 5 plays, 92 yards, 1:35; UMass Dartmouth 7–0)

Second quarter

- (12:33) UMD – Angel Sanchez 10-yard pass from Dante Aviles-Santos, Braedyn DeMarco kick (Drive: 6 plays, 69 yards, 2:18; UMass Dartmouth 14–0)
- (10:11) UMD – Trell Best 73-yard interception, Jalen Kopecky 2-point pass (UMass Dartmouth 22–0)
- (4:29) UMD – Thomas Zednik 13-yard pass from Dante Aviles-Santos, Braedyn DeMarco kick (Drive: 11 plays, 72 yards, 4:10; UMass Dartmouth 29–0)
- (0:15) UMD – Luis Gonzalez 5-yard run, Braedyn DeMarco kick (Drive: 6 plays, 65 yards, 0:56; UMass Dartmouth 36–0)

Third quarter

- (5:08) UMD – Jalen Kopecky 6-yard pass from Dante Aviles-Santos, Braedyn DeMarco kick (Drive: 9 plays, 75 yards, 3:58; UMass Dartmouth 43–0)
- (0:21) UMD – Malachi Johnson 1-yard run, Braedyn DeMarco kick (Drive: 6 plays, 48 yards, 3:10; UMass Dartmouth 50–0)

Fourth quarter

- (3:47) NIC – Joshua Vitti 15-yard pass from Xavier Powell (Drive: 4 plays, 84 yards, 1:31; UMass Dartmouth 50–6)
- (2:46) UMD – Mekhi Wilson 15-yard pass from JC Petrongolo, Braedyn DeMarco kick (Drive: 3 plays, 3 1 yards, 0:11; UMass Dartmouth 57–6)

Statistics	UMD	NIC
First downs	26	21
Plays–yards	570	333
Rushes–yards	273	246
Passing yards	297	87
Passing: comp–att–int	18–29–0	9–28–2
Time of possession	25:30	32:58

Team	Category	Player	Statistics
UMass Dartmouth	Passing	Dante Avile-Santos	17/27, 282 yards, 4 TDs
UMass Dartmouth	Rushing	Luis Gonzalez	11 carries, 117 yards, 1 TD
UMass Dartmouth	Receiving	Angel Sanchez	4 receptions, 78 yards, 2 TDs
Nichols	Passing	Xavier Powell	9/24, 87 yards, 1 TD, 1 INT
Nichols	Rushing	Xavier Powell	10 carries, 74 yards
Nichols	Receiving	Joshua Vitti	3 receptions, 29 yards, 1 TD

=== Curry ===
Game Two – UMass Dartmouth Corsairs (1–0) vs Curry Colonels (0–1)

Quarter	1	2	3	4	Total
Curry	0	0	7	7	14
UMass Dartmouth	13	0	0	15	28

at Cressy Field • Dartmouth, Massachusetts

- Date: Saturday, September 9, 2023
- Game time: 5:00 P.M. EST
- Game weather: Clear
- Game attendance: 2,788
- Referee: Gregg Camara
- Recap, box score

Game information

First quarter

- (6:36) UMD – Marvens Jean 71-yard pass from Dante Aviles-Santos, Braedyn DeMarco kick failed (Drive: 1 plays, 71 yards, 0:11; UMass Dartmouth 6–0)
- (2:02) UMD – Marvens Jean 1-yard run, Braedyn DeMarco kick (Drive: 8 plays, 65 yards, 3:11; UMass Dartmouth 13–0)

Second quarter

No scoring

Third quarter

- (7:32) CUR – Finn Sullivan 2-yard run, Trevor Swanbeck kick (Drive: 13 plays, 85 yards, 7:22; UMass Dartmouth 13–7)

Fourth quarter

- (10:24) CUR – Hunter Telesco 5-yard run, Trevor Swanbeck kick (Drive: 3 plays, 89 yards, 1:00; Curry 13–14)
- (8:11) UMD – Xavier Lopes 11-yard interception, Dante Aviles-Santos rush (UMass Dartmouth 21–14)
- (2:51) UMD – Dante Aviles-Santos 49-yard run, Braedyn DeMarco kick (Drive: 5 plays, 69 yards, 2:58; UMass Dartmouth 28–14)

Statistics	CUR	UMD
First downs	16	14
Plays–yards	71–274	53–391
Rushes–yards	221	126
Passing yards	53	265
Passing: comp–att–int	9–21–1	11–23–1
Time of possession	37:58	22:02

Team	Category	Player	Statistics
Curry	Passing	Dallas Murphy	7/17, 44 yards
Curry	Rushing	Montie Quinn	19 carries, 169 yards
Curry	Receiving	Colin Ridley	3 receptions, 28 yards
UMass Dartmouth	Passing	Dante Aviles-Santos	11/23, 265 yards, 1 TD, 1 INT
UMass Dartmouth	Rushing	Luis Gonzalez	13 carries, 54 yards
UMass Dartmouth	Receiving	Marvens Jean	4 receptions, 91 yards, 1 TD

=== At Framingham State ===
Game Three – UMass Dartmouth Corsairs (2–0) vs Framingham State Rams (0–1)

Quarter	1	2	3	4	Total
UMass Dartmouth	13	7	0	13	33
Framingham State	7	0	0	0	7

at Bowditch Field • Framingham, Massachusetts

- Date: Saturday, September 16, 2023
- Game time: 12:00 p.m. EST
- Game weather: Cloudy
- Game attendance: 800
- Recap, box score

Game information

First quarter

- (10:38) FRA – Noah Demoranville 2-yard run, Matthew Farley kick (Drive: 4 plays, 53 yards, 2:09; Framingham State 0–7)
- (9:43) UMD – Marvens Jean 50-yard run, Braedyn DeMarco kick (Drive: 2 plays, 50 yards, 0:48; Tied 7–7)
- (3:51) UMD – Angel Sanchez 21-yard pass from Dante-Aviles Santos, Braedyn DeMarco kick failed (Drive: 8 plays, 60 yards, 2:52; UMass Dartmouth 13–7)

Second quarter

- (12:54) UMD – Jalen Kopecky 10-yard pass from Dante-Aviles Santos, Braedyn DeMarco kick (Drive: 6 plays, 37 yards, 2:25; UMass Dartmouth 20–7)

Third quarter

No scoring

Fourth quarter

- (13:26) UMD – Jalen Kopecky 22-yard pass from Dante-Aviles Santos, Braedyn DeMarco kick failed (Drive: 5 plays, 52 yards, 2:13; UMass Dartmouth 26–7)
- (10:54) UMD – Luis Gonzalez 16-yard run, Braedyn DeMarco kick (Drive: 3 plays, 53 yards, 1:00; UMass Dartmouth 33–7)

Statistics	UMD	FRA
First downs	19	16
Plays–yards	68–399	64–227
Rushes–yards	182	181
Passing yards	217	46
Passing: comp–att–int	15–31–1	4–21–3
Time of possession	28:00	32:00

Team	Category	Player	Statistics
UMass Dartmouth	Passing	Dante Aviles-Santos	15/31, 217 yards, 3 TDs, 1 INT
UMass Dartmouth	Rushing	Marvens Jean	6 carries, 68 yards, 1 TD
UMass Dartmouth	Receiving	Angel Sanchez	4 receptions, 72 yards, 1 TD
Framingham State	Passing	Henri Borque	3/6, 36 yards, 1 INT
Framingham State	Rushing	Devaun Ford	27 carries, 157 yards
Framingham State	Receiving	Manny Lara	2 receptions, 20 yards

=== Worcester State ===
Game Four – UMass Dartmouth Corsairs (3–0) vs Worcester State Lancers (1–2)

Quarter	1	2	Total
Worcester State			0
UMass Dartmouth			0

at Cressy Field • Dartmouth, Massachusetts

- Date: Saturday, September 23, 2023
- Game time: 12:00 P.M. EST

Game information

First quarter
Second quarter
Third quarter
Fourth quarter

Statistics	WSU	UMD
First downs		
Plays–yards		
Rushes–yards		
Passing yards		
Passing: comp–att–int		
Time of possession		

Team	Category	Player	Statistics
Worcester State	Passing		
Worcester State	Rushing		
Worcester State	Receiving		
UMass Dartmouth	Passing		
UMass Dartmouth	Rushing		
UMass Dartmouth	Receiving		

=== At Western Connecticut ===
Game Five – UMass Dartmouth Corsairs (0–0) vs Western Connecticut Wolves (0–0)

Quarter	1	2	Total
UMass Dartmouth			0
Western Connecticut State			0

at The WAC • Danbury, Connecticut

- Date: Saturday, September 30, 2023
- Game time: TBA EST

Game information

First quarter
Second quarter
Third quarter
Fourth quarter

Statistics	UMD	WCSU
First downs		
Plays–yards		
Rushes–yards		
Passing yards		
Passing: comp–att–int		
Time of possession		

Team	Category	Player	Statistics
UMass Dartmouth	Passing		
UMass Dartmouth	Rushing		
UMass Dartmouth	Receiving		
Western Connecticut	Passing		
Western Connecticut	Rushing		
Western Connecticut	Receiving		

=== Massachusetts Maritime ===
Game Six – UMass Dartmouth Corsairs (0–0) vs Massachusetts Maritime Buccaneers (0–0)

Quarter	1	2	Total
Massachusetts Maritime			0
UMass Dartmouth			0

at Cressy Field • Dartmouth, Massachusetts

- Date: Friday, October 6, 2023
- Game time: 7:00 P.M. EST

Game information

First quarter
Second quarter
Third quarter
Fourth quarter

Statistics	MMA	UMD
First downs		
Plays–yards		
Rushes–yards		
Passing yards		
Passing: comp–att–int		
Time of possession		

Team	Category	Player	Statistics
Massachusetts Maritime	Passing		
Massachusetts Maritime	Rushing		
Massachusetts Maritime	Receiving		
UMass Dartmouth	Passing		
UMass Dartmouth	Rushing		
UMass Dartmouth	Receiving		

=== At Westfield State ===
Game Seven – UMass Dartmouth Corsairs (0–0) vs Westfield State Owls (0–0)

Quarter	1	2	Total
UMass Dartmouth			0
Westfield State			0

at Alumni Field • Westfield, Massachusetts

- Date: Saturday, October 14, 2023
- Game time: TBA EST

Game information

First quarter
Second quarter
Third quarter
Fourth quarter

Statistics	UMD	WSU
First downs		
Plays–yards		
Rushes–yards		
Passing yards		
Passing: comp–att–int		
Time of possession		

Team	Category	Player	Statistics
UMass Dartmouth	Passing		
UMass Dartmouth	Rushing		
UMass Dartmouth	Receiving		
Westfield State	Passing		
Westfield State	Rushing		
Westfield State	Receiving		

=== Fitchburg State ===
Game Eight – UMass Dartmouth Corsairs (0–0) vs Fitchburg State Falcons (0–0)

Quarter	1	2	Total
Fitchburg State			0
UMass Dartmouth			0

at Cressy Field • Dartmouth, Massachusetts

- Date: Saturday, October 21, 2023
- Game time: 4:00 P.M. EST

Game information

First quarter
Second quarter
Third quarter
Fourth quarter

Statistics	FSU	UMD
First downs		
Plays–yards		
Rushes–yards		
Passing yards		
Passing: comp–att–int		
Time of possession		

Team	Category	Player	Statistics
Fitchburg State	Passing		
Fitchburg State	Rushing		
Fitchburg State	Receiving		
UMass Dartmouth	Passing		
UMass Dartmouth	Rushing		
UMass Dartmouth	Receiving		

=== At Bridgewater State ===
Game Nine – UMass Dartmouth Corsairs (0–0) vs Bridgewater State Bears (0–0)

Quarter	1	2	Total
UMass Dartmouth			0
Bridgewater State			0

at Swenson Field • Bridgewater, Massachusetts

- Date: Saturday, October 28, 2023
- Game time: 12:00 P.M. EST

Game information

First quarter
Second quarter
Third quarter
Fourth quarter

Statistics	UMD	BSU
First downs		
Plays–yards		
Rushes–yards		
Passing yards		
Passing: comp–att–int		
Time of possession		

Team	Category	Player	Statistics
UMass Dartmouth	Passing		
UMass Dartmouth	Rushing		
UMass Dartmouth	Receiving		
Bridgewater State	Passing		
Bridgewater State	Rushing		
Bridgewater State	Receiving		

=== Plymouth State ===
Game Ten – UMass Dartmouth Corsairs (0–0) vs Plymouth State Panthers (0–0)

Quarter	1	2	Total
Plymouth State			0
UMass Dartmouth Corsairs			0

at Cressy Field • Dartmouth, Massachusetts

- Date: Saturday, November 11, 2023
- Game time: 12:00 P.M. EST

Game information

First quarter
Second quarter
Third quarter
Fourth quarter

Statistics	PSU	UMD
First downs		
Plays–yards		
Rushes–yards		
Passing yards		
Passing: comp–att–int		
Time of possession		

Team	Category	Player	Statistics
Plymouth State	Passing		
Plymouth State	Rushing		
Plymouth State	Receiving		
UMass Dartmouth	Passing		
UMass Dartmouth	Rushing		
UMass Dartmouth	Receiving		
