= Josh Sylvester =

American football coach (born c. 1983)

Current position
- Title: Head coach
- Team: UMass Dartmouth
- Conference: MASCAC
- Record: 25–7

Biographical details
- Born: c. 1983 (age 42–43); Wareham, Massachusetts, U.S.
- Education: Babson College (2005); University of Massachusetts Dartmouth (2020)

Coaching career (HC unless noted)
- 2009–2010: UMass Dartmouth (OL/RB/S)
- 2011–2020: UMass Dartmouth (OC)
- 2021–2022: UMass Dartmouth (OC/QB)
- 2023–present: UMass Dartmouth

Head coaching record
- Overall: 25–7
- Bowls: 0–1
- Tournaments: 0–1 (NCAA D-III playoffs)

Accomplishments and honors

Championships
- 2 MASCAC (2023, 2024)

Joshua Sylvester (born c. 1983) is an American college football coach. He is the head football coach for the University of Massachusetts Dartmouth, a position he has held since 2023. He was previously the offensive coordinator and quarterbacks coach for eleven seasons before being promoted following the retirement of Mark Robichaud.

== Coaching career ==
Sylvester began his career with UMass Dartmouth in 2009. He previously served as an offensive line, running back, and safety coach before being named as offensive coordinator in 2011.

On February 1, 2023, Sylvester was named the fourth head coach in UMass Dartmouth history following the retirement of 16-year coach Mark Robichaud.

== Personal life and education ==
Sylvester graduated from Babson College in 2005 with a bachelor's degree in entrepreneurship and finance. He earned his master's degree in business administration from UMass Dartmouth in 2020. He has served as the director of alumni relations for UMass Dartmouth after he earned his master's degree.

== Head coaching record ==
| Year | Team | Overall | Conference | Standing | Bowl/playoffs |
|---|---|---|---|---|---|
UMass Dartmouth Corsairs (Massachusetts State Collegiate Athletic Conference) (2023–present)
| 2023 | UMass Dartmouth | 9–2 | 7–1 | T–1st | L New England |
| 2024 | UMass Dartmouth | 10–1 | 9–0 | 1st | L NCAA Division III Second Round |
| 2025 | UMass Dartmouth | 6–4 | 6–3 | 4th | |
| 2026 | UMass Dartmouth | 0–0 | 0–0 | | |
| UMass Dartmouth: | | 25–7 | 22–4 | | |
| Total: | | 25–7 | | | |
National championship Conference title Conference division title or championship game berth
