= William Kavanaugh (American football) =

American football coach (born 1950)

Biographical details
- Born: c. 1950 (age 75–76); Dartmouth, Massachusetts, U.S.
- Education: Stonehill College (1972)

Playing career
- Position: Offensive lineman

Coaching career (HC unless noted)
- 1973–?: Bishop Stang HS (MA) (assistant)
- ?–1989: Dartmouth HS (MA) (assistant)
- 1990–2006: Southeastern Massachusetts / UMass Dartmouth
- 2007–2011: Bishop Stang HS (MA)

Head coaching record
- Overall: 104–64 (college); 18–36 (high school)
- Bowls: 1–2
- Tournaments: 0–1 (NCAA D-III playoffs)

Accomplishments and honors

Championships
- 2 NEFC (1994, 2002)

Awards
- 3× NEFC Coach of the Year (1996, 1998, 2002); Corsair Athletic Hall of Fame (2011)

William Kavanaugh Sr. (born c. 1950) is an American former football coach. He was most recently the head coach for the Bishop Stang High School football team. He was previously an assistant coach for Dartmouth High School before becoming the head coach for the UMass Dartmouth Corsairs football team from 1990 to 2006. He was inducted into the Corsair Hall of Fame in 2011. He is the father of former Bentley Falcons football team head coach Bill Kavanaugh.

== Head coaching record ==
=== College ===
Year	Team	Overall	Conference	Standing	Bowl/playoffs
Southeastern Massachusetts Corsairs (NCAA Division III independent) (1990)
1990	Southeastern Massachusetts	1–8			
UMass Dartmouth Corsairs (New England Football Conference) (1991–2006)
1991	UMass Dartmouth	6–3	4–2	T–2nd (South)	
1992	UMass Dartmouth	5–4	4–4	T–5th	
1993	UMass Dartmouth	5–4	5–3	T–2nd	
1994	UMass Dartmouth	8–3	7–1	T–1st	L ECAC Championship
1995	UMass Dartmouth	4–6	3–5	T–5th	
1996	UMass Dartmouth	8–2	7–1	2nd	
1997	UMass Dartmouth	8–2	6–2	3rd	
1998	UMass Dartmouth	8–2	5–1	2nd (Blue)	
1999	UMass Dartmouth	3–7	2–4	5th (Blue)	
2000	UMass Dartmouth	5–4	4–2	T–2nd (Boyd)	
2001	UMass Dartmouth	6–3	3–2	3rd (Boyd)	
2002	UMass Dartmouth	11–1	5–0	1st (Boyd)	L NCAA Division III First Round
2003	UMass Dartmouth	9–2	4–2	T–2nd (Boyd)	W ECAC Championship
2004	UMass Dartmouth	7–4	4–2	3rd (Boyd)	L ECAC Championship
2005	UMass Dartmouth	5–5	4–2	3rd (Boyd)	
2006	UMass Dartmouth	5–4	4–3	T–3rd (Boyd)	
Southeastern Massachusetts / UMass Dartmouth:		104–64	71–36		
Total:		104–64			
National championship Conference title Conference division title or championship game berth

=== High school ===
Year	Team	Overall	Conference	Standing	Bowl/playoffs
Bishop Stang Spartans () (2007–2011)
2007	Bishop Stang	6–4	1–3	4th	
2008	Bishop Stang	2–9	0–3	4th	
2009	Bishop Stang	2–8	0–4	5th	
2010	Bishop Stang	5–7	1–3	4th	
2011	Bishop Stang	3–8	1–3	4th	
Bishop Stang:		18–36	3–16		
Total:		18–36			
