= UMass Dartmouth Corsairs football =

College football team

2024 UMass Dartmouth Corsairs football team
- First season: 1985; 41 years ago
- Athletic director: Lori Hendricks
- Head coach: Josh Sylvester; 3rd season, 25–7 (.781)
- Location: Dartmouth, Massachusetts
- Stadium: Cressy Field (capacity: 1,850)
- NCAA division: Division III
- Conference: MASCAC
- Colors: Blue and gold
- All-time record: 200–159 (.557)
- Bowl record: 2–2 (.500)

Conference championships
- 2 NEFC (1994, 2002); 3 MASCAC (2022–2024)

Division championships
- 1 NEFC Bogan Division (2002)
- Rivalries: Plymouth State
- Mascot: Arnie
- Website: corsairathletics.com

The UMass Dartmouth Corsairs football team represents the University of Massachusetts Dartmouth in college football at the NCAA Division III level. The Corsairs are members of the Massachusetts State Collegiate Athletic Conference (MASCAC), fielding its team in the MASCAC since 2013. The Corsairs play their home games at Cressy Field in Dartmouth, Massachusetts.

Their head coach is Josh Sylvester, who took over the position in 2023.

== History ==
It was announced in the late 1960s that UMass Dartmouth—then Southeastern Massachusetts University—would establish an American football team as a club team in the coming years. The University of Massachusetts Dartmouth football program played its inaugural season as a club team in 1985 off campus at Sargent Field (now named Paul Walsh Field). The team's first coach was Paul Harrison in 1985, and he held the position until 1989. In 1988, the school transitioned its football team from a club team to an official varsity sport. The university hired William Kavanaugh as their head coach in 1990 until his retirement in 2006. The third head coach, Mark Robichaud, was named as Kavanaugh's successor for the 2007 season where he coached until his retirement following the 2022 season. Josh Sylvester, previously an offensive coordinator for the team, replaced Robichaud.

=== Paul Harrison era (1985–1989) ===
In 1985, Harrison was hired to be their first head coach. He coached the team through its first three years as a club team and then two more years after transitioning to Division III.

In 1988, Harrison led the Corsairs to a 5–4 record, getting his first win against Western New England with the final score being 23–15. The team went on a five-game winning streak beating UMass–Boston (35–3), Worcester State (14–7), Bridgewater State (22–9), and Fitchburg State (34–0) before ending the year dropping three in a row to Framingham State (18–26), Westfield State (0–7), and Massachusetts Maritime (6–14).

The following year in 1989, UMass Dartmouth finished with a record of 2–7 and did not win a single of their five games on the road. The team's first win of the season did not come until homecoming night where the Corsairs beat Framingham State 22–18 at home. They finished the year winning one more game against Massachusetts Maritime 30–16 to finish Harrison's last game as a coach for the team.

=== William Kavanaugh era (1990–2006) ===
In 1990, Kavanaugh took the job as the UMass Dartmouth head coach and finished his first campaign with the team with a 1–8 record; with their only win being Westfield State on the second-to-last-week of the season 14–13. The next season, in 1991, Kavanaugh had turned the team around to accomplish a 6–3 record which was good enough for second in the New England Football Conference (NEFC).

After finishing 5–4 in both 1992 and 1993, the Corsairs finished 8–3 in 1994, their best record in program history up to that point. With a 7–1 conference record UMass Dartmouth was named conference co-champions alongside Maine Maritime and were invited to the team's first postseason appearance in the ECAC Northwest Championship Bowl at Union College. The team lost against Union 34–14 for its first action in postseason play.

The team went 4–6 in 1995 before going 8–2 three consecutive years from 1996 to 1998. Finishing second in the NEFC in 1996 and 1998 and third in 1997. Despite having an 8–2 record for three straight years the team was yet to get a spot in the NCAA Division III Football Championship playoffs. The team went 3–7 in 1999, 5–4 in 2000, and 6–3 in 2001.

In 2002, Kavanaugh led the team to an undefeated regular season record of 11–0. The Corsairs beat their opponents by at least 20 points in all but three outings, including a 44–0 win over Utica on homecoming night. UMass Dartmouth beat Westfield State 16–0 in the NEFC Championship Game to advance into their first ever playoff tournament appearance and postseason appearance since they were co-champions in 1994. The Corsairs lost their first-ever tournament appearance 6–56 against the Muhlenberg Mules.

Despite the large loss in the previous year, UMass Dartmouth followed their undefeated season with a 9–2 record including a 21–7 victory over Worcester State in the ECAC Northeast Bowl, making the team back-to-back champions. The following year Kavanaugh went 7–4 as the coach and once again went to the ECAC Northwest Bowl, they lost to Ithaca 19–36 in what would be Kavanaugh's last bowl game appearance.

The last two seasons of Kavanaugh's career were average, going 5–5 in 2005 and 5–4 the following year. His final record with the team was 104–64 (.619) including two bowl game victories. He was named NEFC Coach of the Year three times throughout his seventeen years with the Corsairs, and is currently still the team's all-time leader in coaching wins and seasons coached. He was inducted into the UMass Dartmouth Hall of Fame in 2011.

=== Mark Robichaud era (2007–2022) ===
In 2007, UMass Dartmouth hired Mark Robichaud to be their next head coach, despite having no prior head coaching experience. In Robichaud's first season with the team they went 5–5. The team started 0–5, but after beating Nichols, 28–7, the team won five straight to finish at an even .500. Over the next ten years the team was consistently below average, reaching as high 6–4 in 2008 and as low as 0–10 in 2009 and 1–9 in 2012.

In 2019, the Corsairs began the season with a 54–7 win over Alfred State and won their first four games of the season before falling to Framingham State 33–39. The team would drop another game to Bridgewater State 20–56 before winning their homecoming game against Worcester State 46–8. The team finished with a record of 7–3, their best since their last bowl game appearance in 2004 under Kavanaugh. In 2020, the season was cancelled due to the COVID-19 pandemic.

In 2021, Robichaud and the Corsairs compiled a record of 9–2 en route to a New England Bowl appearance where the team faced Alfred State. The game ended in a 42–16 win for the Corsairs, their first bowl win since 2003.

In 2022, the team finished with a 9–1 record, a trip to the playoffs, and a MASCAC championship after beating Plymouth State 46–21 in Plymouth, New Hampshire. He was also given the Murray Lewis Award, given to an outstanding football coach who positively influenced the game of football. Robichaud was named as the BSN Coach of the Year.

Under Robichaud, UMass Dartmouth produced 49 all-conference selections, and in 2016 the MASCAC Offensive Player of the Year was junior running back Eddie Sheridan.

On February 1, 2023, Robichaud announced his retirement; he finished as the school's second all-time leader in coaching wins.

=== Josh Sylvester era (2023–present) ===
On February 1, 2023, following Robichaud's retirement, former Corsair offensive coordinator Josh Sylvester took over the position. In his first season as head coach he led the team to a 9–1 regular season record and finished as conference co-champions alongside Bridgewater State and Western Connecticut. Following the season the Corsairs earned their second bid to the New England Bowl against Western New England, which they lost 37–7.

== Championships ==
=== Conference championship ===
UMass Dartmouth has won five championships, sharing two.

Season	Conference	Coach	Overall record	Conference record	Opponent	Score
1994†	New England Football Conference	William Kavanaugh	8–3	7–0	n/a	n/a
2002	New England Football Conference	William Kavanaugh	11–1	5–0	Westfield State	W 16–0
2022	Massachusetts State Collegiate Athletic Conference	Mark Robichaud	9–2	8–0	n/a	n/a
2023†	Massachusetts State Collegiate Athletic Conference	Josh Sylvester	9–2	7–1	n/a	n/a
2024	Massachusetts State Collegiate Athletic Conference	Josh Sylvester	10–1	9–0	n/a	n/a

† Co-champions

=== Division championships ===
UMass Dartmouth has won one division championship, their first, and only, being in the 2002 season as they won the Boyd Division with a record of 11–1.

Year	Division	Coach	Overall record	Conference record
2002	New England Football Conference	William Kavanaugh	11–1	5–0

== Bowl games ==
UMass Dartmouth has participated in five bowl games, going 2–3.

Season	Coach	Bowl	Opponent	Result	Source
1994	William Kavanaugh	ECAC Bowl	Union	L 14–34	
2003	William Kavanaugh	ECAC Northeast Bowl	Worcester State	W 21–7	
2004	William Kavanaugh	ECAC Northwest Bowl	Ithaca	L 19–36	
2021	Mark Robichaud	New England Bowl	Alfred State	W 42–16	
2023	Josh Sylvester	New England Bowl	Western New England	L 7–37	

== Conference affiliations ==
- New England Football Conference (1991–2012)
- Massachusetts State Collegiate Athletic Conference (2013–present)

== List of head coaches ==
=== Key ===
Key to symbols in coaches list
General		Overall		Conference		Postseason (Note: Although the first Rose Bowl Game was played in 1902, it has been continuously played since the 1916 game, and is recognized as the oldest bowl game by the NCAA. "—" indicates any season prior to 1916 when postseason games were not played.)	
No.	Order of coaches (Note: A running total of the number of head coaches, with coaches who served separate tenures being counted only once. Interim head coaches are represented with "Int" and are not counted in the running total. "—" indicates the team played but either without a coach or no coach is on record. "X" indicates an interim year without play.)	GC	Games coached	CW	Conference wins	PW	Postseason wins
DC	Division championships	OW	Overall wins	CL	Conference losses	PL	Postseason losses
CC	Conference championships	OL	Overall losses	CT	Conference ties	PT	Postseason ties
NC	National championships	OT	Overall ties (Note: Overtime rules in college football were introduced in 1996, making ties impossible in the period since.)	C%	Conference winning percentage		
†	Elected to the College Football Hall of Fame	O%	Overall winning percentage (Note: When computing the win–loss percentage, a tie counts as half a win and half a loss.)				

=== Coaches ===
List of head football coaches showing season(s) coached, overall records, conference records, postseason records, championships and selected awards
No.	Name	Season(s)	GC	OW	OL	O%	CW	CL	C%	PW	PL	DC	CC	NC	Awards
1	Paul Harrison	1985–1989	18	7	11	0.389	–	–	–	–	–	–	–	–	–
2	William Kavanaugh	1990–2006	168	104	64	0.619	71	36	0.664	1	3	1	2	–	NEFC Coach of the Year (1996, 1998, 2002)
3	Mark Robichaud	2007–2022	151	70	81	0.464	55	59	0.482	1	1	–	1	–	Murray Lewis Award (2022) BSN Coach of the Year (2022)
4	Josh Sylvester	2023–present	22	19	3	0.864	16	1	0.941	0	1	–	2	–	–

== Postseason appearances ==
=== NCAA Division III playoffs ===
The Corsairs have made three appearances in the NCAA Division III playoffs, with a combined record of 0–3.

Year	Round	Opponent	Result	Source
2002	First Round	Muhlenberg	L 6–56	
2022	First Round	Ithaca	L 20–63	
2024	Second Round	Springfield	L 27–54	

== Year-by-year results ==
National champions	Conference champions	Bowl game berth	Playoff berth

Season	Year	Head Coach	Association	Division	Conference	Record							Postseason	Final ranking
Season	Year	Head Coach	Association	Division	Conference	Overall			Conference				Postseason	Final ranking
Season	Year	Head Coach	Association	Division	Conference	Win	Loss	Tie	Finish	Win	Loss	Tie	Postseason	Final ranking
Southeastern Massachusetts Corsairs
1985	1985	Paul Harrison	Club team											
1986	1986	Paul Harrison	Club team											
1987	1987	Paul Harrison	Club team											
1988	1988	Paul Harrison	NCAA	Division III	—	5	4	0	–	–	–	–	—	—
1989	1989	Paul Harrison	NCAA	Division III	—	2	7	0	–	–	–	–	—	—
1990	1990	William Kavanaugh	NCAA	Division III	—	1	8	0	–	–	–	–	—	—
UMass Dartmouth Corsairs
1991	1991	William Kavanaugh	NCAA	Division III	NEFC	6	3	0	T–2nd (South)	4	2	0	—	—
1992	1992	William Kavanaugh	NCAA	Division III	NEFC	5	4	0	T–5th	4	4	0	—	—
1993	1993	William Kavanaugh	NCAA	Division III	NEFC	5	4	0	T–2nd	5	3	0	—	—
1994	1994	William Kavanaugh	NCAA	Division III	NEFC	8	3	0	T–1st	7	1	0	Lost ECAC Championship 14–34	—
1995	1995	William Kavanaugh	NCAA	Division III	NEFC	4	6	0	T–5th	3	5	0	—	—
1996	1996	William Kavanaugh	NCAA	Division III	NEFC	8	2	0	2nd	7	1	0	—	—
1997	1997	William Kavanaugh	NCAA	Division III	NEFC	8	2	0	3rd	6	2	0	—	—
1998	1998	William Kavanaugh	NCAA	Division III	NEFC	8	2	0	2nd (Blue)	5	1	0	—	—
1999	1999	William Kavanaugh	NCAA	Division III	NEFC	3	7	0	5th (Blue)	2	4	0	—	—
2000	2000	William Kavanaugh	NCAA	Division III	NEFC	5	4	0	T–2nd (Boyd)	4	2	0	—	—
2001	2001	William Kavanaugh	NCAA	Division III	NEFC	6	3	0	3rd (Boyd)	3	2	0	—	—
2002	2002	William Kavanaugh	NCAA	Division III	NEFC	11	1	0	1st (Boyd)	5	0	0	Lost NCAA Division III First Round 6–56	—
2003	2003	William Kavanaugh	NCAA	Division III	NEFC	9	2	0	T–2nd (Boyd)	4	2	0	Won ECAC Championship 21–7	—
2004	2004	William Kavanaugh	NCAA	Division III	NEFC	7	4	0	3rd (Boyd)	4	2	0	Lost ECAC Championship 19–36	—
2005	2005	William Kavanaugh	NCAA	Division III	NEFC	5	5	0	3rd (Boyd)	4	2	0	—	—
2006	2006	William Kavanaugh	NCAA	Division III	NEFC	5	4	0	T–3rd (Boyd)	4	3	0	—	—
2007	2007	Mark Robichaud	NCAA	Division III	NEFC	5	5	0	T–3rd (Boyd)	4	3	0	—	—
2008	2008	Mark Robichaud	NCAA	Division III	NEFC	6	4	0	3rd (Boyd)	4	3	0	—	—
2009	2009	Mark Robichaud	NCAA	Division III	NEFC	0	10	0	8th (Boyd)	0	7	0	—	—
2010	2010	Mark Robichaud	NCAA	Division III	NEFC	3	7	0	6th (Boyd)	2	5	0	—	—
2011	2011	Mark Robichaud	NCAA	Division III	NEFC	5	5	0	4th (Boyd)	4	3	0	—	—
2012	2012	Mark Robichaud	NCAA	Division III	NEFC	1	9	0	T–6th (Boyd)	1	6	0	—	—
2013	2013	Mark Robichaud	NCAA	Division III	MASCAC	3	6	0	T–6th	3	5	0	—	—
2014	2014	Mark Robichaud	NCAA	Division III	MASCAC	4	6	0	T–6th	3	5	0	—	—
2015	2015	Mark Robichaud	NCAA	Division III	MASCAC	4	6	0	T–6th	3	5	0	—	—
2016	2016	Mark Robichaud	NCAA	Division III	MASCAC	5	5	0	T–3rd	4	4	0	—	—
2017	2017	Mark Robichaud	NCAA	Division III	MASCAC	4	6	0	5th	4	4	0	—	—
2018	2018	Mark Robichaud	NCAA	Division III	MASCAC	5	5	0	T–5th	4	4	0	—	—
2019	2019	Mark Robichaud	NCAA	Division III	MASCAC	7	3	0	4th	5	3	0	—	—
Season canceled due to COVID-19
2021	2021	Mark Robichaud	NCAA	Division III	MASCAC	9	2	0	2nd	6	2	0	Won New England Bowl 42–16	—
2022	2022	Mark Robichaud	NCAA	Division III	MASCAC	9	2	0	1st	8	0	0	Lost NCAA Division III First Round 20–63	—
2023	2023	Josh Sylvester	NCAA	Division III	MASCAC	9	2	0	T–1st	7	1	0	Lost New England Bowl 7–37	—
2024	2024	Josh Sylvester	NCAA	Division III	MASCAC	10	1	0	1st	9	0	0	Lost NCAA Division III Second Round 27–54	—
2025	2025	Josh Sylvester	NCAA	Division III	MASCAC	6	4	0	4th	6	3	0	—	—

== Cressy Field ==
Cressy Field
- Location: 285 Old Westport Rd; Dartmouth, MA 02747
- Owner: University of Massachusetts Dartmouth
- Operator: University of Massachusetts Dartmouth
- Capacity: 1,850
- Surface: FieldTurf

Construction
- Opened: 1988

Tenant
- UMass Dartmouth Corsairs (NCAA) (1985–present)

Cressy Field is a multi-purpose stadium in Dartmouth, Massachusetts, with a seating capacity of 1,850. It is home to the University of Massachusetts Dartmouth Corsairs football, field hockey, lacrosse and track and field teams. The facility opened in 1988.

The field is named after former chancellor Peter H. Cressy. It received renovations for artificial turf in 2002.
