= Joe Verria =

American football coach

Current position
- Title: Head coach
- Team: Bridgewater State
- Conference: MASCAC
- Record: 54–39

Biographical details
- Education: Bridgewater State University (1980)

Playing career
- 1976–1979: Bridgewater State
- 1980: Green Bay Packers*
- 1981: Cincinnati Bengals*
- 1982: Miami Dolphins*
- 1983: New England Patriots*
- Position: Defensive tackle

Coaching career (HC unless noted)
- 1985–1987: East Bridgewater HS (MA)
- 1988–2015: Bridgewater State (DC)
- 2016–present: Bridgewater State

Head coaching record
- Overall: 54–39 (college)
- Bowls: 2–0
- Tournaments: 0–1 (NCAA D-III playoffs)

Accomplishments and honors

Championships
- 2 MASCAC (2016, 2023)

Joseph Verria is an American college football coach and former player. He is the head football coach for Bridgewater State University, a position he has held since 2016.

A star player at Bridgewater State for head coach Peter Mazzaferro from 1976 to 1979, Verria spent time on the preseason rosters of several National Football League teams, including the Green Bay Packers under head coach Bart Starr in 1980, the Cincinnati Bengals under head coach Forrest Gregg in 1981, the Miami Dolphins under head coach Don Shula in 1982, and the New England Patriots under head coach Ron Meyer in 1983.

== Head coaching record ==
=== College ===
Year	Team	Overall	Conference	Standing	Bowl/playoffs
Bridgewater State Bears (Massachusetts State Collegiate Athletic Conference) (2016–present)
2016	Bridgewater State	8–3	8–0	1st	L NCAA Division III First Round
2017	Bridgewater State	2–8	2–6	T–7th	
2018	Bridgewater State	8–3	6–2	T–2nd	W New England
2019	Bridgewater State	6–4	6–2	T–2nd	
2020–21	No team—COVID-19				
2021	Bridgewater State	6–4	6–2	T–2nd	
2022	Bridgewater State	7–4	6–2	T–2nd	W New England
2023	Bridgewater State	7–3	7–1	T–1st	
2024	Bridgewater State	5–5	5–4	T–3rd	
2025	Bridgewater State	5–5	5–4	T–5th	
2026	Bridgewater State	0–0	0–0		
Bridgewater State:		54–39	51–23		
Total:		54–39			
National championship Conference title Conference division title or championship game berth
