= 2022 UMass Dartmouth Corsairs football team =

American college football season

2022 UMass Dartmouth Corsairs football

MASCAC champion

NCAA Division III First Round, L 20–63 at Ithaca
- Conference: Massachusetts State Collegiate Athletic Conference
- Record: 9–2 (8–0 MASCAC)
- Head coach: Mark Robichaud (15th season)
- Offensive coordinator: Josh Sylvester (11th season)
- Defensive coordinator: Steve Faniel (15th season)
- Home stadium: Cressy Field

2022 Massachusetts State Collegiate Athletic Conference football standings
| | Conf. | | | Overall |
| Team | W | | L | W | | L |
|---|---|---|---|---|---|---|
| UMass Dartmouth $^ | 8 | – | 0 | 9 | – | 2 |
| Plymouth State | 6 | – | 2 | 9 | – | 2 |
| Western Connecticut | 6 | – | 2 | 7 | – | 3 |
| Bridgewater State | 6 | – | 2 | 7 | – | 4 |
| Framingham State | 4 | – | 4 | 5 | – | 5 |
| Massachusetts Maritime | 3 | – | 5 | 3 | – | 7 |
| Westfield State | 2 | – | 6 | 2 | – | 8 |
| Worcester State | 1 | – | 7 | 1 | – | 9 |
| Fitchburg State | 0 | – | 8 | 1 | – | 9 |
$ – Conference champion; ^ – NCAA Division III playoff participant

The 2022 UMass Dartmouth Corsairs football team represented the University of Massachusetts Dartmouth as a member of the Massachusetts State Collegiate Athletic Conference (MASCAC) during the 2022 NCAA Division III football season. The Corsairs, led by 16th-year head coach Mark Robichaud, played their home games at Cressy Field in Dartmouth, Massachusetts.

== Schedule ==
| Date | Time | Opponent | Site | TV | Result | Attendance |
|---|---|---|---|---|---|---|
| September 3 | 12:00 p.m. | Husson* | Cressy Field; Dartmouth, MA | | W 35–14 | 1,843 |
| September 10 | 12:00 p.m. | at Anna Maria* | Caparso Field; Paxton, MA | Boxcast TV | L 48–63 | 197 |
| September 17 | 1:30 p.m. | Framingham State | Cressy Field; Dartmouth, MA | LEC Network | W 46–21 | 1,921 |
| September 24 | 2:30 p.m. | at Worcester State | John Coughlin Memorial Field; Worcester, MA | Youtube | W 41–20 | 1,206 |
| September 30 | 7:00 p.m. | Western Connecticut | Cressy Field; Dartmouth, MA | LEC Network | W 48–21 | 2,500 |
| October 6 | 7:00 p.m. | at Massachusetts Maritime | Clean Harbors Stadium; Buzzards Bay, MA | Boxcast TV | W 28–14 | 1,891 |
| October 15 | 4:00 p.m. | Westfield State | Cressy Field; Dartmouth, MA | LEC Network | W 34–7 | 2,227 |
| October 22 | 12:00 p.m. | at Fitchburg State | Elliot Field Athletic Complex; Fitchburg, MA | Boxcast TV | W 49–0 | 1,500 |
| October 29 | 12:00 p.m. | Bridgewater State | Cressy Field; Dartmouth, MA | LEC Network | W 48–7 | 2,145 |
| November 12 | 1:00 p.m. | at Plymouth State | Panther Field; Plymouth, NH | LEC Network | W 46–21 | 1,112 |
| November 19 | 12:00 p.m. | at No. 9 Ithaca* | Butterfield Stadium; Ithaca, NY (NCAA Division III First Round) | ICTV | L 20–63 | 563 |
*Non-conference game; Rankings from AFCA Poll released prior to the game; All times are in Eastern time

== Game summaries ==
=== Husson ===
Game One – UMass Dartmouth Corsairs (0–0) vs Husson Eagles (0–0)

| Quarter | 1 | 2 | 3 | 4 | Total |
|---|---|---|---|---|---|
| Husson | 0 | 7 | 7 | 0 | 14 |
| UMass Dartmouth | 7 | 7 | 14 | 7 | 35 |

at Cressy Field • Dartmouth, Massachusetts

- Date: Saturday, September 3, 2022
- Game time: 12:00 p.m. EST
- Game weather: Sunny
- Game attendance: 1,843
- Referee: Ronnie Patry

Game information

First quarter

- (4:29) UMD – Dante Aviles-Santos 12 Yd Run, Braedyn DeMarco Kick (UMass Dartmouth 7–0)

Second quarter

- (11:51) UMD – Antonio Brown 25 Yd Pass, Braedyn DeMarco Kick (UMass Dartmouth 14–0)
- (2:11) HUS – Dom Wilson 5 Yd Pass, Aaron Paradis Kick (UMass Dartmouth 14–7)

Third quarter

- (8:36) UMD – Easten Coleman 1 Yd Pass, Braedyn DeMarco Kick (UMass Dartmouth 21–7)
- (3:29) UMD – Isaiah Cole 37 Yd Pass, Braedyn DeMarco Kick (UMass Dartmouth 28–7)
- (1:39) HUS – Elijah Garnett 36 Yd Run, Aaron Paradis Kick (UMass Dartmouth 28–14)

Fourth quarter

- (6:08) UMD – Antonio Brown 3 Yd Pass, Braedyn DeMarco Kick (UMass Dartmouth 35–14)

| Statistics | UMD | HUS |
|---|---|---|
| First downs | 30 | 9 |
| Plays–yards | 93–558 | 58–246 |
| Rushes–yards | 363 | 86 |
| Passing yards | 195 | 160 |
| Passing: comp–att–int | 26–45–0 | 10–26–1 |
| Time of possession | 31:19 | 28:41 |

| Team | Category | Player | Statistics |
|---|---|---|---|
| Husson | Passing | Nic Visser | 10/26, 160 yards, 1 TD, 1 INT |
| Husson | Rushing | Elijah Garnett | 15 carries, 103 yards, 1 TD |
| Husson | Receiving | Cristian Walker | 4 receptions, 64 yards |
| UMass Dartmouth | Passing | Dante Aviles-Santos | 25/44, 178 yards, 4 TD |
| UMass Dartmouth | Rushing | Marven Jeans | 26 carries, 254 yards |
| UMass Dartmouth | Receiving | Antonio Stakley | 7 receptions, 57 yards |

=== At Anna Maria ===
Game Two – UMass Dartmouth Corsairs (1–0) vs Anna Maria Amcats (0–0)

| Quarter | 1 | 2 | 3 | 4 | Total |
|---|---|---|---|---|---|
| UMass Dartmouth | 0 | 13 | 14 | 21 | 48 |
| Anna Maria | 14 | 28 | 14 | 7 | 63 |

at Caparso Field • Paxton, Massachusetts

- Date: Saturday, September 10, 2022
- Game time: 12:00 p.m. EST
- Game weather: Sunny
- Game attendance: 197

Game information

First quarter

- (11:31) ANC – Alex Cohen 2 Yd Run, Drew Sinclair Kick (Anna Maria 7–0)
- (6:06) ANC – Devin Tolbert 49 Yd Pass, Drew Sinclair Kick (Anna Maria 14–0)

Second quarter

- (14:04) ANC – Deandre Wallace 49 Yd Pass, Drew Sinclair Kick (Anna Maria 21–0)
- (9:28) ANC – Justin McMillia 11 Yd Pass, Drew Sinclair Kick (Anna Maria 28–0)
- (9:17) UMD – Marvens Jean 58 Yd Run, Braedyn DeMarco PAT Failed (Anna Maria 28–6)
- (5:08) ANC – Alex Cohen 2 Yd Run, Drew Sinclair Kick (Anna Maria 35–6)
- (2:04) ANC – Justin McMillia 42 Yd Pass, Drew Sinclair Kick (Anna Maria 42–6)
- (1:13) UMD – Thomas Zednik 25 Yd Pass, Braedyn DeMarco Kick (Anna Maria 42–13)

Third quarter

- (5:39) UMD – Owen Quigley 18 Yd Pass, Braedyn DeMarco Kick (Anna Maria 42–20)
- (2:26) ANC – Justin McMillia 47 Yd Pass, Drew Sinclair Kick (Anna Maria 49–20)
- (0:47) ANC – Justin McMillia 27 Yd Pass, Drew Sinclair Kick (Anna Maria 56–20)
- (0:17) UMD – Keenan Little 75 Yd Pass, Braedyn DeMarco Kick (Anna Maria 56–27)

Fourth quarter

- (13:40) UMD – Marvens Jean 61 Yd Run, Braedyn DeMarco Kick (Anna Maria 56–34)
- (13:18) UMD – Team Safety (Anna Maria 56–36)
- (11:19) UMD – Keenan Little 35 Yd Pass, Braedyn DeMarco PAT Failed (Anna Maria 56–42)
- (5:35) UMD – Dante Aviles-Santos 23 Yd Run, Braedyn DeMarco PAT Failed (Anna Maria 56–48)
- (1:38) ANC – Ryan Russell 14 Yd Run, Drew Sinclair Kick (Anna Maria 63–48)

| Statistics | UMD | ANC |
|---|---|---|
| First downs | 31 | 23 |
| Plays–yards | 84–631 | 74–537 |
| Rushes–yards | 269 | 99 |
| Passing yards | 362 | 438 |
| Passing: comp–att–int | 19–43–1 | 17–33–0 |
| Time of possession | 27:37 | 32:12 |

| Team | Category | Player | Statistics |
|---|---|---|---|
| UMass Dartmouth | Passing | Dante Aviles-Santos | 19/43, 362 yards, 4 TD, 1 INT |
| UMass Dartmouth | Rushing | Marven Jeans | 19 carries, 219 yards, 2 TD |
| UMass Dartmouth | Receiving | Keenan Little | 2 receptions, 110 yards, 2 TD |
| Anna Maria | Passing | Alex Cohen | 15/30, 415 yards, 6 TD |
| Anna Maria | Rushing | Kahlil Bowens | 13 carries, 53 yards |
| Anna Maria | Receiving | Justin McMillia | 5 receptions, 184 yards, 4 TD |

=== Framingham State ===
Game Three – UMass Dartmouth Corsairs (1–1) vs Framingham State Rams (1–1)

| Quarter | 1 | 2 | 3 | 4 | Total |
|---|---|---|---|---|---|
| Framingham State | 7 | 0 | 7 | 7 | 21 |
| UMass Dartmouth | 14 | 15 | 10 | 7 | 46 |

at Cressy Field • Dartmouth, Massachusetts

- Date: Saturday, September 17, 2022
- Game time: 1:30 p.m. EST
- Game weather: Sunny
- Game attendance: 1,921
- Referee: Ronnie Patry

Game information

First quarter

- (13:56) UMD – Mike Vincent 24 Yd Pass, Braedyn DeMarco Kick (UMass Dartmouth 7–0)
- (7:33) UMD – Angel Sanchez 22 Yd Pass, Braedyn DeMarco Kick (UMass Dartmouth 14–0)
- (2:18) FSU – Devaun Ford 18 Yd Run, Matthew Farley Kick (UMass Dartmouth 14–7)

Second quarter

- (13:37) UMD – Braedyn DeMarco 24 Yd Field Goal (UMass Dartmouth 17–7)
- (1:37) UMD – Keenan Little 23 Yd Pass, Braedyn DeMarco PAT Failed (UMass Dartmouth 23–7)
- (0:27) UMD – Angel Sanchez 50 Yd Pass, Braedyn DeMarco PAT Failed (UMass Dartmouth 29–7)

Third quarter

- (9:11) UMD – Braedyn DeMarco 19 Yd Field Goal (UMass Dartmouth 32–7)
- (6:46) UMD – Sam Alicea 0 Yd Interception, Braedyn DeMarco Kick (UMass Dartmouth 39–7)
- (6:25) FSU – Jaden Lewis 90 Yd Kickoff Return, Matthew Farley Kick (UMass Dartmouth 39–14)

Fourth quarter

- (8:38) UMD – Richarno Hylton 29 Yd Run, Braedyn DeMarco Kick (UMass Dartmouth 46–14)
- (3:13 FSU – Darrell Coombs 6 Yd Pass, Matthew Farley Kick (UMass Dartmouth 46–21)

| Statistics | FSU | UMD |
|---|---|---|
| First downs | 12 | 24 |
| Plays–yards | 51–212 | 78–474 |
| Rushes–yards | 200 | 153 |
| Passing yards | 12 | 321 |
| Passing: comp–att–int | 3–16–3 | 18–37–1 |
| Time of possession | 21:32 | 38:28 |

| Team | Category | Player | Statistics |
|---|---|---|---|
| Framingham State | Passing | Nick Goffredo | 2/15, 6 yards, 3 INT |
| Framingham State | Rushing | Devaun Ford | 23 carries, 143 yards, 1 TD |
| Framingham State | Receiving | Darrell Coombs | 1 reception, 6 yards, 1 TD |
| UMass Dartmouth | Passing | Dante Aviles-Santos | 18/36, 321 yards, 4 TD, 1 INT |
| UMass Dartmouth | Rushing | Jayln Aponte | 19 carries, 58 yards |
| UMass Dartmouth | Receiving | Angel Sanchez | 5 receptions, 161 yards, 2 TD |

=== At Worcester State ===
Game Four – UMass Dartmouth Corsairs (2–1) vs Worcester State Lancers (1–2)

| Quarter | 1 | 2 | 3 | 4 | Total |
|---|---|---|---|---|---|
| UMass Dartmouth | 14 | 14 | 7 | 6 | 41 |
| Worcester State | 0 | 0 | 7 | 13 | 20 |

at John Coughlin Memorial Field • Worcester, Massachusetts

- Date: Saturday, September 24, 2022
- Game time: 2:30 p.m. EST
- Game weather: Windy
- Game attendance: 1,206
- Referee: William Gosseli

Game information

First quarter

- (12:16) UMD – Luis Gonzalez 3 Yd Run, Braedyn DeMarco Kick (UMass Dartmouth 7–0)
- (5:03) UMD – Richarno Hylton 3 Yd Run, Braedyn DeMarco Kick (UMass Dartmouth 14–0)

Second quarter

- (7:53) UMD – Jayln Aponte 1 Yd Run, Braedyn DeMarco Kick (UMass Dartmouth 21–0)
- (4:06) UMD – Richarno Hylton 2 Yd Run, Braedyn DeMarco Kick (UMass Dartmouth 28–0)

Third quarter

- (12:55) WSU – Ebenezer Ankoma 23 Yd Interception, Santiago Rodriguez-D'Atri Kick (UMass Dartmouth 28–7)
- (5:16) UMD – Isaiah Cole 10 Yd Pass, Braedyn DeMarco Kick (UMass Dartmouth 35–7)

Fourth quarter

- (14:26) UMD – Richarno Hylton 3 Yd Run, Braedyn DeMarco Kick (UMass Dartmouth 41–7)
- (8:04) WSU – Deion Osei-Sarpong 25 Yd Pass, Santiago Rodriguez-D'Atri Kick (UMass Dartmouth 41–14)
- (2:00) WSU – Mike Loveless 68 Yd Run, Santiago Rodriguez-D'Atri PAT Failed (UMass Dartmouth 41–20)

| Statistics | UMD | WSU |
|---|---|---|
| First downs | 36 | 9 |
| Plays–yards | 83–657 | 47–214 |
| Rushes–yards | 250 | 81 |
| Passing yards | 407 | 133 |
| Passing: comp–att–int | 33–40–1 | 12–22–1 |
| Time of possession | 37:07 | 22:53 |

| Team | Category | Player | Statistics |
|---|---|---|---|
| UMass Dartmouth | Passing | Dante Aviles-Santos | 26/33, 354 yards, 1 TD, 1 INT |
| UMass Dartmouth | Rushing | Richarno Hylton | 8 carries, 77 yards, 3 TD |
| UMass Dartmouth | Receiving | Angel Sanchez | 5 receptions, 120 yards |
| Worcester State | Passing | Aaron-Moses Williams | 10/20, 120 yards, 1 TD, 1 INT |
| Worcester State | Rushing | Mike Loveless | 1 carry, 68 yards, 1 TD |
| Worcester State | Receiving | Deion Osei-Sarpong | 3 receptions, 44 yards, 1 TD |

=== Western Connecticut ===
Game Five – UMass Dartmouth Corsairs (3–1) vs Western Connecticut Wolves (2–2)

| Quarter | 1 | 2 | 3 | 4 | Total |
|---|---|---|---|---|---|
| Western Connecticut State | 7 | 7 | 7 | 0 | 21 |
| UMass Dartmouth | 14 | 13 | 7 | 14 | 48 |

at Cressy Field • Dartmouth, Massachusetts

- Date: Friday, September 30, 2022
- Game time: 7:00 p.m. EST
- Game weather: Sunny
- Game attendance: 2,500
- Referee: Gregg Camara

Game information

First quarter

- (13:16) UMD – Luis Gonzalez 5 Yd Run, Braedyn DeMarco Kick (UMass Dartmouth 7–0)
- (8:50) UMD – Malakie Simao 34 Yd Pass, Braedyn DeMarco Kick (UMass Dartmouth 14–0)
- (3:50) WCS – Shakespeare Rodriguez 1 Yd Run, Anthony Weidtman Kick (UMass Dartmouth 14–7)

Second quarter

- (11:33) WCS – Chad Blaszky 13 Yd Pass, Anthony Weidtman Kick (Tied 14–14)
- (7:19) UMD – Angel Sanchez 10 Yd Pass, Braedyn DeMarco PAT Failed (UMass Dartmouth 20–14)
- (0:51) UMD – Easten Coleman 43 Yd Pass, Braedyn DeMarco Kick (UMass Dartmouth 27–14)

Third quarter

- (6:45) UMD – Keenan Little 15 Yd Pass, Braedyn DeMarco Kick (UMass Dartmouth 34–14)
- (3:49) WCS – Chad Blaszky 1 Yd Run, Anthony Weidtman Kick (UMass Dartmouth 34–21)

Fourth quarter

- (13:58) UMD – Ammon Schirling 4 Yd Pass, Braedyn DeMarco Kick (UMass Dartmouth 41–14)
- (10:37) UMD – Angel Sanchez 65 Yd Pass, Braedyn DeMarco Kick (UMass Dartmouth 48–14)

| Statistics | WCSU | UMD |
|---|---|---|
| First downs | 18 | 24 |
| Plays–yards | 62–285 | 61–514 |
| Rushes–yards | 139 | 181 |
| Passing yards | 146 | 333 |
| Passing: comp–att–int | 13–26–0 | 20–25–1 |
| Time of possession | 33:43 | 26:17 |

| Team | Category | Player | Statistics |
|---|---|---|---|
| Western Connecticut | Passing | John Giller | 13/26, 146 yards, 1 TD |
| Western Connecticut | Rushing | Chad Blaszky | 25 carries, 118 yards, 1 TD |
| Western Connecticut | Receiving | David Ross | 3 receptions, 48 yards |
| UMass Dartmouth | Passing | Dante Aviles-Santos | 20/25, 333 yards, 6 TD, 1 INT |
| UMass Dartmouth | Rushing | Luis Gonzalez | 19 carries, 112 yards, 1 TD |
| UMass Dartmouth | Receiving | Angel Sanchez | 7 receptions, 141 yards, 2 TD |

=== At Massachusetts Maritime ===
Game Six – UMass Dartmouth Corsairs (4–1) vs Massachusetts Maritime Buccaneers (2–2)

| Quarter | 1 | 2 | 3 | 4 | Total |
|---|---|---|---|---|---|
| UMass Dartmouth | 7 | 14 | 7 | 0 | 28 |
| Worcester State | 0 | 0 | 14 | 0 | 14 |

at Clean Harbors Stadium • Buzzards Bay, Massachusetts

- Date: Thursday, October 6, 2022
- Game time: 7:00 p.m. EST
- Game weather: Clear
- Game attendance: 1,891
- Referee: Jordan Hopson

Game information

First quarter

- (6:51) UMD – Luis Gonzalez 28 Yd Run, Braedyn DeMarco Kick (UMass Dartmouth 7–0)

Second quarter

- (9:03) UMD – Angel Sanchez 22 Yd Pass, Braedyn DeMarco Kick (UMass Dartmouth 14–0)
- (6:29) UMD – Dante Aviles-Santos 4 Yd Run, Braedyn DeMarco Kick (UMass Dartmouth 21–0)

Third quarter

- (11:16) MMA – Declan Van Nest 41 Yd Pass, Logan Tsika Kick (UMass Dartmouth 21–7)
- (6:01) MMA – Andrew Brightma 3 Yd Pass, Logan Tsika Kick (UMass Dartmouth 21–14)
- (2:42) UMD – Luis Gonzalez 1 Yd Run, Braedyn DeMarco Kick (UMass Dartmouth 28–14)

Fourth quarter

No scoring

| Statistics | UMD | MMA |
|---|---|---|
| First downs | 21 | 15 |
| Plays–yards | 68–457 | 53–290 |
| Rushes–yards | 138 | 32 |
| Passing yards | 319 | 258 |
| Passing: comp–att–int | 19–30–0 | 17–26–1 |
| Time of possession | 27:39 | 30:37 |

| Team | Category | Player | Statistics |
|---|---|---|---|
| UMass Dartmouth | Passing | Dante Aviles-Santos | 19/30, 319 yards, 1 TD |
| UMass Dartmouth | Rushing | Richarno Hylton | 14 carries, 66 yards |
| UMass Dartmouth | Receiving | Angel Sanchez | 6 receptions, 191 yards, 1 TD |
| Massachusetts Maritime | Passing | Marc Murphy | 17/26, 258 yards, 2 TD, 1 INT |
| Massachusetts Maritime | Rushing | Ja'iel Johnson | 15 carries, 54 yards |
| Massachusetts Maritime | Receiving | Declan Van Nest | 2 receptions, 64 yards, 1 TD |

=== Westfield State ===
Game Seven – UMass Dartmouth Corsairs (5–1) vs Westfield State Owls (0–5)

| Quarter | 1 | 2 | 3 | 4 | Total |
|---|---|---|---|---|---|
| Westfield State | 0 | 0 | 0 | 7 | 7 |
| UMass Dartmouth | 0 | 7 | 13 | 14 | 34 |

at Cressy Field • Dartmouth, Massachusetts

- Date: Friday, October 15, 2022
- Game time: 4:00 p.m. EST
- Game weather: Sunny
- Game attendance: 2,227
- Referee: Rick Puente

Game information

First quarter

No scoring

Second quarter

- (7:50) UMD – Winston DeLeon 32 Yd Pass, Braedyn DeMarco Kick (UMass Dartmouth 7–0)

Third quarter

- (9:33) UMD – Luis Gonzalez 2 Yd Pass, Braedyn DeMarco Kick (UMass Dartmouth 14–0)
- (3:14) UMD – Richarno Hylton 45 Yd Run, Braedyn DeMarco PAT Failed (UMass Dartmouth 20–0)

Fourth quarter

- (11:42) UMD – Luis Gonzalez 2 Yd Run, Braedyn DeMarco Kick (UMass Dartmouth 27–0)
- (9:00) WSU – Dylan Disabella 20 Yd Pass, Evan Milstead Kick (UMass Dartmouth 27–7)
- (2:13) UMD – Luis Gonzalez 13 Yd Run, Braedyn DeMarco Kick (UMass Dartmouth 34–7)

| Statistics | WSU | UMD |
|---|---|---|
| First downs | 12 | 20 |
| Plays–yards | 65–166 | 77–466 |
| Rushes–yards | -5 | 199 |
| Passing yards | 171 | 267 |
| Passing: comp–att–int | 15–38–2 | 18–39–1 |
| Time of possession | 30:37 | 29:23 |

| Team | Category | Player | Statistics |
|---|---|---|---|
| Westfield State | Passing | Colby Pires | 13/31, 156 yards, 1 TD, 2 INT |
| Westfield State | Rushing | Jordan Smith | 15 carries, 44 yards |
| Westfield State | Receiving | Dylan Disabella | 7 receptions, 104 yards, 1 TD |
| UMass Dartmouth | Passing | Dante Aviles-Santos | 18/39, 267 yards, 2 TD, 1 INT |
| UMass Dartmouth | Rushing | Richarno Hylton | 9 carries, 77 yards, 1 TD |
| UMass Dartmouth | Receiving | Angel Sanchez | 9 receptions, 152 yards, 1 TD |

=== At Fitchburg State ===
Game Eight – UMass Dartmouth Corsairs (6–1) vs Fitchburg State Falcons (1–6)

| Quarter | 1 | 2 | 3 | 4 | Total |
|---|---|---|---|---|---|
| UMass Dartmouth | 21 | 14 | 14 | 0 | 49 |
| Fitchburg State | 0 | 0 | 0 | 0 | 0 |

at Elliot Field • Fitchburg, Massachusetts

- Date: Saturday, October 22, 2022
- Game time: 12:00 p.m. EST
- Game weather: Mostly Sunny
- Game attendance: 1,500
- Referee: Gregg Camara

Game information

First quarter

- (11:37) UMD – Luis Gonzalez 3 Yd Run, Braedyn DeMarco Kick (UMass Dartmouth 7–0)
- (6:50) UMD – Luis Gonzalez 1 Yd Run, Braedyn DeMarco Kick (UMass Dartmouth 14–0)
- (2:19) UMD – Jalyn Aponte 2 Yd Run, Braedyn DeMarco Kick (UMass Dartmouth 21–0)

Second quarter

- (6:30) UMD – Jalyn Aponte 2 Yd Pass, Braedyn DeMarco Kick (UMass Dartmouth 28–0)
- (0:16) UMD – Angel Sanchez 21 Yd Pass, Braedyn DeMarco Kick (UMass Dartmouth 35–0)

Third quarter

- (12:25) UMD – Jalyn Aponte 54 Yd Run, Braedyn DeMarco Kick (UMass Dartmouth 42–0)
- (4:57) UMD – Jacob Gibbons 1 Yd Run, Braedyn DeMarco Kick (UMass Dartmouth 49–0)

Fourth quarter

No scoring

| Statistics | UMD | FSU |
|---|---|---|
| First downs | 25 | 5 |
| Plays–yards | 68–532 | 38–23 |
| Rushes–yards | 362 | -19 |
| Passing yards | 170 | 42 |
| Passing: comp–att–int | 10–18–0 | 7–19–2 |
| Time of possession | 30:07 | 29:53 |

| Team | Category | Player | Statistics |
|---|---|---|---|
| UMass Dartmouth | Passing | Dante Aviles-Santos | 7/14, 141 yards |
| UMass Dartmouth | Rushing | Jalyn Aponte | 6 carries, 117 yards, 2 TD |
| UMass Dartmouth | Receiving | Angel Sanchez | 7 receptions, 155 yards, 1 TD |
| Fitchburg State | Passing | Dylan Cosner | 3/5, 22 yards |
| Fitchburg State | Rushing | Elijah Zaire McKnight | 6 carries, 8 yards |
| Fitchburg State | Receiving | Brandon Cohen | 3 receptions, 19 yards |

=== Bridgewater State ===
Game Nine – UMass Dartmouth Corsairs (7–1) vs Bridgewater State Bears (4–3)

| Quarter | 1 | 2 | 3 | 4 | Total |
|---|---|---|---|---|---|
| Bridgewater State | 0 | 0 | 7 | 0 | 7 |
| UMass Dartmouth | 14 | 21 | 6 | 7 | 48 |

at Cressy Field • Dartmouth, Massachusetts

- Date: Saturday, October 29, 2022
- Game time: 12:00 p.m. EST
- Game weather: Sunny
- Game attendance: 2,145
- Referee: Bill Gosselin

Game information

First quarter

- (9:31) UMD – Luis Gonzalez 1 Yd Run, Braedyn DeMarco Kick (UMass Dartmouth 7–0)
- (5:09) UMD – Richarno Hylton 9 Yd Run, Braedyn DeMarco Kick (UMass Dartmouth 14–0)

Second quarter

- (14:57) UMD – Luis Gonzalez 1 Yd Run, Braedyn DeMarco Kick (UMass Dartmouth 21–0)
- (9:36) UMD – Thomas Zednik 5 Yd Pass, Braedyn DeMarco Kick (UMass Dartmouth 28–0)
- (4:41) UMD – Jalyn Aponte 1 Yd Run, Braedyn DeMarco Kick (UMass Dartmouth 35–0)

Third quarter

- (11:04) UMD – Richarno Hylton 7 Yd Run, Braedyn DeMarco PAT Failed (UMass Dartmouth 41–0)
- (9:00) BSU – Jack McCarthy 38 Yd Pass, Joey Naso Kick (UMass Dartmouth 41–7)

Fourth quarter

- (2:53) UMD – Luis Gonzalez 4 Yd Run, Braedyn DeMarco Kick (UMass Dartmouth 48–7)

| Statistics | BSU | UMD |
|---|---|---|
| First downs | 12 | 27 |
| Plays–yards | 59–223 | 88–627 |
| Rushes–yards | 95 | 278 |
| Passing yards | 128 | 349 |
| Passing: comp–att–int | 13–33–0 | 21–35–1 |
| Time of possession | 24:00 | 36:00 |

| Team | Category | Player | Statistics |
|---|---|---|---|
| Bridgewater State | Passing | James Cahoon | 13/32, 128 yards, 1 TD |
| Bridgewater State | Rushing | Adam Couch | 16 rushes, 68 yards |
| Bridgewater State | Receiving | Adam Couch | 5 receptions, 46 yards |
| UMass Dartmouth | Passing | Dante Aviles-Santos | 21/35, 349 yards, 1 TD, 1 INT |
| UMass Dartmouth | Rushing | Jalyn Aponte | 14 carries, 132 yards, 1 TD |
| UMass Dartmouth | Receiving | Thomas Zednik | 4 receptions, 100 yards, 1 TD |

=== At Plymouth State ===
Game Ten – UMass Dartmouth Corsairs (8–1) vs Plymouth State Panthers (7–1)

| Quarter | 1 | 2 | 3 | 4 | Total |
|---|---|---|---|---|---|
| UMass Dartmouth | 12 | 7 | 20 | 7 | 46 |
| Plymouth State | 0 | 14 | 0 | 7 | 21 |

at Panther Field • Plymouth, New Hampshire

- Date: Saturday, November 12, 2022
- Game time: 12:00 p.m. EST
- Game weather: Temperature: 65 °F (18 °C) • Weather: Cloudy
- Game attendance: 1,112
- Referee: Chris Hadden
- TV: LEC Network

Game information

First quarter

- (8:19) UMD – Richarno Hylton 10 Yd Run, PAT Failed (UMass Dartmouth 6–0)
- (11:59) UMD – Jalyn Aponte 37 Yd Run, PAT Failed (UMass Dartmouth 12–0)

Second quarter

- (9:11) PSU – Manny Sanchez 2 Yd Run, Seth Disalvo Kick (UMass Dartmouth 12–7)
- (4:31) UMD – Luis Gonzalez 3 Yd Run, Braedyn DeMarco Kick (UMass Dartmouth 19–7)
- (0:23) PSU – Jake Donahue 8 Yd Pass, Seth Disalvo Kick (UMass Dartmouth 19–14)

Third quarter

- (6:56) UMD – Angel Sanchez 4 Yd Pass, Braedyn DeMarco Kick (UMass Dartmouth 26–14)
- (2:40) UMD – Mike Vincent 18 Yd Pass, PAT failed (UMass Dartmouth 32–14)
- (0:29) UMD – Angel Sanchez 12 Yd Pass, Braedyn DeMarco Kick (UMass Dartmouth 39–14)

Fourth quarter

- (7:42) UMD – Luis Gonzalez 3 Yd Run, Braedyn DeMarco Kick (UMass Dartmouth 46–14)
- (0:05) PSU – Manny Sanchez 3 Yd Run, Seth Disalvo Kick (UMass Dartmouth 46–21)

| Statistics | UMD | PSU |
|---|---|---|
| First downs | 28 | 16 |
| Plays–yards | 72–542 | 63–271 |
| Rushes–yards | 226 | 113 |
| Passing yards | 316 | 158 |
| Passing: comp–att–int | 26–29–0 | 12–28–1 |
| Time of possession | 31:35 | 28:25 |

| Team | Category | Player | Statistics |
|---|---|---|---|
| UMass Dartmouth | Passing | Dante Aviles-Santos | 26/29, 316 yards, 3 TD |
| UMass Dartmouth | Rushing | Richarno Hylton | 12 carries, 71 yards, 1 TD |
| UMass Dartmouth | Receiving | Angel Sanchez | 8 receptions, 121 yards, 2 TD |
| Plymouth State | Passing | Braden Lynn | 12/28, 158 yards, 1 TD, 1 INT |
| Plymouth State | Rushing | Manny Sanchez | 22 carries, 91 yards, 2 TD |
| Plymouth State | Receiving | Bryan Warren | 5 receptions, 75 yards |

=== At No. 9 Ithaca ===
Game Eleven – UMass Dartmouth Corsairs (9–1) vs No. 9 Ithaca Bombers (10–0)

| Quarter | 1 | 2 | 3 | 4 | Total |
|---|---|---|---|---|---|
| UMass Dartmouth | 0 | 0 | 6 | 14 | 20 |
| No. 9 Ithaca | 21 | 21 | 0 | 21 | 63 |

at Butterfield Stadium • Ithaca, New York

- Date: Saturday, November 19, 2022
- Game time: 12:00 p.m. EST
- Game weather: Temperature: 31 °F (−1 °C) • Weather: Sunny
- Referee: Jay Johnson
- TV: ICTV

Game information

First quarter

- (12:42) ITH – Jake Williams 11 Yd Pass, Nicholas Bahamondem Kick (No. 9 Ithaca 7–0)
- (9:50) ITH – Jake Williams 1 Yd Run, Nicholas Bahamonde Kick (No. 9 Ithaca 14–0)
- (8:35) ITH – Jake Williams 1 Yd Run, Nicholas Bahamonde Kick (No. 9 Ithaca 21–0)

Second quarter

- (12:00) ITH – Jonathan Koumas 21 Yd Pass, Nicholas Bahamonde Kick (No. 9 Ithaca 28–0)
- (4:53) ITH – Jalen Leonard-Osborne 35 Yd Run, Nicholas Bahamonde Kick (No. 9 Ithaca 35–0)
- (1:55) ITH – Conner Hayes 5 Yd Run, Nicholas Bahamonde Kick (No. 9 Ithaca 42–0)

Third quarter

- (2:57) UMD – Luis Gonzalez 16 Yd Pass, PAT Failed (No. 9 Ithaca 42–6)

Fourth quarter

- (14:50) ITH – Max Perry 33 Yd Run, Nicholas Bahamonde Kick (No. 9 Ithaca 49–6)
- (5:14) UMD – Luis Gonzalez 9 Yd Run, Braedyn DeMarco Kick (No. 9 Ithaca 49–13)
- (4:59) ITH – Anthony D'Addetta 60 Yd Pass, Nicholas Bahamonde Kick (No. 9 Ithaca 56–13)
- (4:04) UMD – Keenan Little 62 Yd Pass, Braedyn DeMarco Kick (No. 9 Ithaca 56–20)
- (2:01) ITH – Max Perry 21 Yd Run, Nicholas Bahamond Kick (No. 9 Ithaca 63–20)

| Statistics | UMD | ITH |
|---|---|---|
| First downs | 24 | 27 |
| Plays–yards | 75–394 | 69–540 |
| Rushes–yards | 145 | 365 |
| Passing yards | 249 | 175 |
| Passing: comp–att–int | 20–34–2 | 14–18–1 |
| Time of possession | 27:43 | 32:17 |

| Team | Category | Player | Statistics |
|---|---|---|---|
| UMass Dartmouth | Passing | Dante Aviles-Santos | 20/34, 249 yards, 2 TD, 2 INT |
| UMass Dartmouth | Rushing | Luis Gonzalez | 10 carries, 52 yards, 1 TD |
| UMass Dartmouth | Receiving | Keenan Little | 4 receptions, 78 yards, 1 TD |
| No. 9 Ithaca | Passing | Max Perry | 5/6, 95 yards, 1 TD |
| No. 9 Ithaca | Rushing | Jalen Leonard-Osbourne | 9 carries, 89 yards, 1 TD |
| No. 9 Ithaca | Receiving | Anthony D'Addetta | 2 reception, 59 yards, 1 TD |

== Personnel ==
=== Coaching staff ===
| Name | Position |
|---|---|
| Mark Robichaud | Head coach |
| Steve Faniel | Defensive coordinator |
| Andrew Gacioch | Defensive line coach |
| Ryan McCormack | Associate head coach/Running backs coach/Recruiting coordinator |
| John Gendron | Linebackers coach |
| Josh Sylvester | Offensive coordinator/quarterbacks coach |
| Ryan Struthers | Wide receivers coach/special teams coordinator |
| Bryan McCann | Offensive line coach |
| Justin Borden | Offensive line coach |
| Andrew Brown | Defensive back coach |
| Joe Paulo | Student assistant coach |

=== Roster ===
2022 UMass Dartmouth Corsairs Football
| Quarterbacks: 3 – Angel Arce – freshman (6'1, 160); 6 – Dante Aviles-Santos – junior (6'1, 180); 18 – Joey McCann – freshman (6'0, 215); 20 – Liam Smith – freshman (6'0, 180); 21 – Jacob Furtado – freshman (6'3, 185); 24 – Matt Gacioch – sophomore (6'3, 200); 27 – Lucas Gay – freshman (5'11, 195); 29 – Matt Kirrane – freshman (5'11, 170); Running backs: 1 – Marven Jean – sophomore (6'0, 225); 4 – Luis Gonzalez – senior (6'1, 225); 9 – Jalyn Aponte – sophomore (5'10, 200); 13 – Richarno Hylton – junior (5'8, 180); 34 – Napoleon DeBarros – freshman (5'10, 205); 37 – Chau'zen Davis – freshman (6'2, 210); 38 – Jayden Massey – freshman (5'8, 190); 41 – Jacob Gibbons – freshman (5'4, 160); 42 – Terry Cousin – freshman (6'0, 215); 43 – Efosa Imade – freshman (5'10, 190); Wide receivers: 2 – Isaiah Cole – junior (5'10, 175); 5 – Angel Sanchez – sophomore (6'0, 185); 7 – Antonio Stakley – junior (5'9, 174); 8 – Thomas Zednik – sophomore (6'5, 210); 10 – Jonathan Brightman – sophomore (6'1, 180); 11 – Antonio Brown – sophomore (6'2, 185); 12 – Winston DeLeon – senior (5'10, 200); 14 – Malakie Simao – junior (6'2, 175); 15 – Owen Quigley – sophomore (6'0, 175); 16 – Myles Ward – freshman (5'9, 175); 17 – Easten Coleman – sophomore (6'0, 185); 19 – Keenan Little – 5th (6'4, 200); 22 – PJ Higgins – freshman (5'9, 185); 29 – Hunter Remington – freshman (5'10, 175); 33 – Matt Castagiuolo – freshman (5'9, 165); 36 – Jason Motta – sophomore (5'8, 150); 80 – Richard Medeiros – freshman (5'10, 165); 81 – Mike Vincent – sophomore (6'2, 180); 82 – Donovan Clark – freshman (6'1, 175); 83 – Jaden Pimental – freshman (6'1, 185); 85 – Malik White – freshman (5'9, 165); 86 – Myzel Vilbrun – freshman (6'3, 220); 89 – Donovan Wright – freshman (5'10, 165) | Tight end: 87 – Ammon Schirling – junior (6'5, 265); Offensive linemen: 52 – Imani Ramirez – freshman (6'1, 310); 54 – Josiah Cora – freshman (5'10, 220); 59 – Michael Cuartas – freshman (6'1, 255); 61 – Jacob Roberts – freshman (6'2, 220); 62 – Kolby Stockwell – sophomore (6'3, 280); 63 – Liam Whaley – senior (6'1, 285); 65 – Collin Farr – sophomore (6'7, 260); 66 – Jameson Griffith – freshman (6'1, 280); 68 – Oscar Alvarez – freshman (5'10, 335); 69 – Henry Doane – junior (6'2, 260); 70 – Colby Briggs – freshman (6'1, 280); 72 – Brandon DiChiaro – senior (6'3, 290); 73 – Andrew Paulus – 5th (6'1, 265); 74 – Tyler Gmyr – sophomore (6'5, 300); 75 – Carlos Goncalves-Robalo – senior (6'1, 310); 76 – LaPriest Agnew – freshman (6'2, 325); 78 – Saih Hill-Gore – senior (6'1, 260); 79 – Matt Goodison – freshman (6'2, 300) | Defensive linemen: 0 – Justin Nortelus – sophomore (6'2, 220); 23 – Hassan Gaye – freshman (6'1, 230); 48 – Josh Lacerte – senior (6'0, 210); 50 – Alex Santini – freshman (5'11, 190); 51 – Mekhi Geter – 5th (6'1, 250); 56 – Isaiah Delgado – freshman (6'0, 235); 58 – Woodley Felix – sophomore (6'4, 200); 64 – Ryan Rego – junior (6'1, 230); 67 – Jeffy Le – freshman (5'8, 265); 77 – Marcus Elysee – 5th (6'2, 270); 90 – Kairis Codio – freshman (6'0, 290); 91 – Jason Scott – freshman (6'2, 230); 92 – Liva Dunner – freshman (6'0, 265); 93 – Bryan Silva – freshman (6'0, 240); 95 – Kyle Hicks, Jr. – freshman (5'11, 210); 96 – Xavier Webster – freshman (6'2, 200); 97 – Lamar Beaton – freshman (6'0, 215); 98 – Jaylin Daniels – freshman (6'3, 245); 99 – Chinedu Obi – freshman (6'4, 265); Linebackers: 5 – Javien Delgado – 5th (5'11, 225); 9 – Sean Portley – freshman (5'11, 190); 10 – Ty Couto – senior (5'11, 200); 21 – Dylan Bradley – freshman (5'9, 180); 24 – Kevin Franjul – freshman (5'11, 225); 25 – Malik Gibson – 5th (6'2, 185); 32 – Mike Henricksen – sophomore (6'1, 220); 35 – Nathaniel Lopes – freshman (6'0, 210); 40 – Jaydon Lame – junior (5'11, 210); 44 – Jackson Wellman – junior (6'2, 220); 45 – Sam Alicea – sophomore (6'0, 210); 46 – Dante Paredes-Martinez – freshman (6'0, 190); 47 – Douglas Chicca – junior (5'9, 205); 53 – Jake Sioch – freshman (6'0, 230); 55 – Randy Jean-Francois – junior (5'10, 225); 60 – Angel Velez – freshman (6'0, 225) | Defensive backs: 1 – Logan Chappell – junior (6'1, 185); 2 – Trell Best – junior (5'10, 185); 3 – Adam Washington – 5th (6'3, 205); 4 – CJ Waite – junior (6'2, 210); 6 – Gary Poyser – freshman (6'1, 180); 7 – JP Mason – 5th (6'1, 175); 8 – Stevie Kolodko – senior (6'1, 180); 11 – Carlos Giron – freshman (6'1, 170); 12 – Connor Donohue – senior (5'9, 175); 13 – Isaiah Price – sophomore (5'9, 180); 14 – Alex Kakooza – freshman (6'1, 165); 15 – Teshawn Campbell – freshman (5'9, 180); 18 – Anthony Perez – freshman (5'9, 175); 19 – Matthias Barros – freshman (5'9, 175); 22 – Jeremie Alecia-Leroy – freshman (6'0 175); 26 – Michael Koussa – sophomore (5'11, 170); 28 – Will Tuttle – senior (5'8, 170); 30 – Shane Meerbott – junior (6'1, 180); 31 – Brady Burke – freshman (6'1, 165); 39 – Walter Lazare – senior (5'10, 180); 88 – Michael Silvestro – freshman (5'7, 170); Placekicker: 94 – Braedyn DeMarco – sophomore (6'1, 200) |
Source and player details, 2022 UMass Dartmouth Corsairs (10/22/2022):

== Statistics ==
=== Team ===
| | UMass Dartmouth | Opp |
|---|---|---|
| Scoring | 443 | 251 |
| Points per game | 40.27 | 22.82 |
| First downs | 290 | 158 |
| Rushing | 139 | 71 |
| Passing | 136 | 69 |
| Penalty | 15 | 18 |
| Rushing yards | 2,564 | 1,186 |
| Avg per play | 5.4 | 3.4 |
| Avg per game | 233.1 | 107.8 |
| Rushing touchdowns | 34 | 16 |
| Passing yards | 3,288 | 1,182 |
| Att–Comp–Int | 375–230–8 | 285–133–12 |
| Avg per pass | 8.8 | 6.4 |
| Avg per game | 298.9 | 165.6 |
| Passing touchdowns | 30 | 18 |
| Total offense | 5,852 | 3,007 |
| Avg per game | 532.0 | 273.4 |
| Fumbles–Lost | 22–11 | 21–9 |
| Penalties–Yards | 72–672 | 64–505 |
| Avg per game | 61.1 | 45.9 |

| | UMass Dartmouth | Opp |
|---|---|---|
| Punts–Yards | 29–972 | 64–2,410 |
| Avg per punt | 31.9 | 36.9 |
| Time of possession/Game | 31:12 | 28:37 |
| 3rd down conversions | 71–146 | 38–141 |
| 4th down conversions | 13–38 | 9–26 |
| Touchdowns scored | 64 | 36 |
| Field goals–Attempts | 2–2 | 0–1 |
| PAT–Attempts | 51–63 | 35–36 |

=== Individual leaders ===
==== Offense ====
Passing statistics
| # | NAME | POS | RAT | CMP | ATT | YDS | AVG/G | CMP% | TD | INT | LONG |
|---|---|---|---|---|---|---|---|---|---|---|---|
| 6 | Dante Aviles-Santos | QB | 155.6 | 219 | 362 | 3,189 | 289.9 | 60.5% | 28 | 8 | 75 |
| 24 | Matt Gacioch | QB | 195.7 | 10 | 12 | 82 | 8.2 | 83.3% | 2 | 0 | 21 |
| 2 | Isaiah Cole | WR | 242.8 | 1 | 1 | 17 | 1.6 | 100.0% | 0 | 0 | 17 |
| | TOTALS | | 157.12 | 230 | 375 | 3,288 | 298.9 | 61.3% | 30 | 8 | 75 |

Rushing statistics
| # | NAME | POS | ATT | YDS | AVG | TD | LONG |
|---|---|---|---|---|---|---|---|
| 9 | Jalyn Aponte | RB | 101 | 637 | 6.3 | 5 | 54 |
| 13 | Richarno Hylton | RB | 101 | 580 | 5.7 | 8 | 45 |
| 4 | Luis Gonzalez | RB | 99 | 499 | 5.0 | 15 | 28 |
| 1 | Marven Jean | RB | 50 | 193 | 9.9 | 2 | 61 |
| 41 | Jacob Gibbons | RB | 25 | 193 | 7.7 | 1 | 16 |
| 6 | Dante Aviles-Santos | QB | 56 | 180 | 3.2 | 3 | 28 |
| 85 | Malik White | WR | 9 | 64 | 7.1 | 0 | 26 |
| 38 | Jayden Massey | RB | 2 | 15 | 7.5 | 0 | 8 |
| 34 | Napoleon DeBarros | RB | 7 | 13 | 1.9 | 0 | 4 |
| 37 | Chau'zen Davis | RB | 2 | 3 | 1.5 | 0 | 3 |
| 5 | Angel Sanchez | WR | 2 | 1 | 0.5 | 0 | 4 |
| 21 | Jacob Furtado | QB | 1 | 0 | 0.0 | 0 | 0 |
| 19 | Keenan Little | WR | 1 | -2 | -2.0 | 0 | 0 |
| 20 | Liam Smith | QB | 1 | -14 | -14.0 | 0 | 0 |
| 24 | Matt Gacioch | QB | 4 | -25 | -6.8 | 0 | 0 |
| | TOTALS | | 472 | 2,564 | 5.4 | 34 | 61 |

Receiving statistics
| # | NAME | POS | CTH | YDS | AVG | TD | LONG |
|---|---|---|---|---|---|---|---|
| 8 | Angel Sanchez | WR | 38 | 759 | 20.0 | 9 | 78 |
| 18 | Keenan Little | WR | 17 | 394 | 23.2 | 5 | 55 |
| 81 | Easton Coleman | WR | 25 | 346 | 13.8 | 2 | 41 |
| 9 | Isaiah Cole | RB | 18 | 229 | 12.7 | 3 | 36 |
| 19 | Antonio Stakley | WR | 20 | 200 | 10.0 | 2 | 31 |
| 17 | Mike Vincent | WR | 14 | 166 | 11.9 | 1 | 28 |
| 4 | Thomas Zednik | RB | 15 | 150 | 10.0 | 3 | 45 |
| 85 | Thomas Zednik | WR | 4 | 62 | 15.5 | 1 | 30 |
| 12 | Winston DeLeon | WR | 3 | 39 | 13.0 | 1 | 20 |
| 15 | Eric Woodbury | WR | 2 | 33 | 16.5 | 0 | 23 |
| 10 | Diondre Ellis | WR | 5 | 29 | 5.8 | 1 | 11 |
| 46 | Jonathan Brightman | WR | 1 | 15 | 15.0 | 0 | 15 |
| 6 | Dante Aviles-Santos | QB | 2 | 5 | 2.5 | 1 | 3 |
| 87 | Isaiah Cole | WR | 1 | 1 | 1.0 | 0 | 1 |
| 74 | Tyler Gmyr | OL | 0 | 0 | NaN | 0 | 1 |
| | TOTALS | | 165 | 2,428 | 14.7 | 30 | 78 |

==== Special teams ====
Punting statistics
| # | NAME | POS | PUNTS | AVG | LONG | YDS |
|---|---|---|---|---|---|---|
| 2 | Matt Gacioch | QB | 44 | 35.1 | 49 | 1,545 |
| | TOTALS | | 44 | 35.1 | 49 | 1,545 |
