= 2022 Massachusetts State Collegiate Athletic Conference football season =

- League: NCAA Division III
- Sport: football
- Duration: September 2, 2022; November 2022
- Teams: 9
- TV partner: LEC Network

2023 NFL draft
- Champion: UMass Dartmouth

Seasons
- ← 2021 2023 →

2022 Massachusetts State Collegiate Athletic Conference football standings
	Conf.			Overall
Team	W		L	W		L
UMass Dartmouth $^	8	–	0	9	–	2
Plymouth State	6	–	2	9	–	2
Western Connecticut	6	–	2	7	–	3
Bridgewater State	6	–	2	7	–	4
Framingham State	4	–	4	5	–	5
Massachusetts Maritime	3	–	5	3	–	7
Westfield State	2	–	6	2	–	8
Worcester State	1	–	7	1	–	9
Fitchburg State	0	–	8	1	–	9
$ – Conference champion; ^ – NCAA Division III playoff participant

The 2022 Massachusetts State Collegiate Athletic Conference football season was the 10th season of the Massachusetts State Collegiate Athletic Conference football taking place during the 2022 NCAA Division III football season. The season began on September 2 with non-conference play. Conference play began on September 16, 2022.

The MASCAC Championship Game was played at Panther Field in Plymouth, New Hampshire, on November 12, 2022. The game featured the UMass Dartmouth Corsairs and the Plymouth State Panthers.

== Preseason ==
=== Recruiting classes ===
National Rankings
Team	Total Signees
Bridgewater State	30
Fitchburg State	19
Framingham State	20
Massachusetts Maritime	30
Plymouth State	34
UMass Dartmouth	60
Western Connecticut	46
Westfield State	29
Worcester State	30

=== Preseason poll ===
The preseason poll was released on August 30, 2022.

MASCAC
Predicted finish	Team	Votes (1st place)
1	Framingham State (5)	61
2	UMass Dartmouth (4)	59
3	Bridgewater State	50
4	Western Connecticut	40
5	Massachusetts Maritime	35
6	Plymouth State	34
7	Worcester State	22
8	Westfield State	15
9	Fitchburg State	8

- First place votes in ()

== Head coaches ==
Team	Head coach	Years at school	Overall record	Record at school	MASCAC record
Bridgewater State	Joe Verria	7	37–26	37–26	34–14
Fitchburg State	Scott Sperone (games 1–5) / Mark Sullivan (games 6–10)	2 / 1	1–14 / 4–46	1–14 / 0–5	0–11 / 3–33
Framingham State	Tom Kelley	18	120–67–1	120–67–1	64–8
Massachusetts Maritime	Jeremy Cameron	18	59–102	59–102	24–48
Plymouth State	Paul Castonia	19	87–125	85–97	33–39
UMass Dartmouth	Mark Robichaud	16	70–81	70–81	40–36
Western Connecticut	Joe Loth	10	110–101	54–37	31–17
Westfield State	Pete Kowalski	9	22–60	22–60	17–47
Worcester State	Adam Peloquin	3	4–16	4–16	4–12

== Schedule ==
Index to colors and formatting
MASCAC member won
MASCAC member lost
MASCAC teams in **bold**

All times EST time.

† denotes Homecoming game

=== Regular season schedule ===
==== Week One ====
Date	Time	Visiting team	Home team	Site	TV	Result	Attendance	Ref.
September 2	7:00 PM	**Worcester State**	WPI	John F. Coughlin • Worcester, MA		**L** 21–58	1,084	
September 2	7:00 PM	Dean	**Fitchburg State**	Elliot Field • Fitchburg, MA		**W** 33–28	750	
September 2	7:00 PM	Nichols	**Westfield State**	Alumni Field • Westfield, MA		**L** 29–30	2,229	
September 3	12:00 PM	Ithaca	**Bridgewater State**	Swenson Field • Bridgewater State		**L** 14–51	1,700	
September 3	12:00 PM	Husson	**UMass Dartmouth**	Cressy Field • Dartmouth, MA		**W** 35–14	1,843	
September 3	12:00 PM	**Framingham State**	Brockport State	Bob Boozer Field • Brockport, NY		**L** 7–27	2,356	
September 3	12:00 PM	Castleton	**Plymouth State**	Panther Field • Plymouth, NH	LEC Network	**W** 20–7	760	
September 3	1:00 PM	**Western Connecticut**	William Paterson	Wightman Stadium • Wayne, NJ		**L** 7–28	0	
^{#}Rankings from AP Poll released prior to game. All times are in EST.

==== Week Two ====
Date	Time	Visiting team	Home team	Site	TV	Result	Attendance	Ref.
September 9	7:00 PM	**Massachusetts Maritime**	SUNY Maritime	Reinhart Field • Throggs Neck, NY (14th Annual Chowder Bowl)		**L** 14–17	842	
September 10	12:00 PM	**UMass Dartmouth**	Anna Maria	Caparso Field • Paxton, MA	Boxcast TV	**L** 48–63	197	
September 10	12:00 PM	St. John Fisher	**Framingham State**	Bowditch Field • Framingham, MA		**W** 31–20	1,023	
September 10	12:00 PM	**Plymouth State**	Husson	Winkin Complex • Bangor, ME		**W** 17–0	1,700	
September 10	1:00 PM	**Westfield State**	Western New England	Golden Bear Stadium • Springfield, MA		**L** 14–38	2,575	
September 10	1:00 PM	**Worcester State**	Union	Frank Bailey Field • Schenectady, NY		**L** 7–76	1,515	
September 10	1:00 PM	**Bridgewater State**	New England	UNE Blue Storm Stadium • Biddeford, ME		**L** 23–38	1,624	
September 10	1:00 PM	**Fitchburg State**	Castelton	Dave Wolk Stadium • Castleton, VT		**L** 0–48	4,112	
September 10	3:00 PM	**Western Connecticut**		Eugene L. Shirk • Reading, PA		**W** 28–14	1,000	
^{#}Rankings from AP Poll released prior to game. All times are in EST.

==== Week Three ====
Date	Time	Visiting team	Home team	Site	TV	Result	Attendance	Ref.
September 16	7:00 PM	**Western Connecticut**	**Westfield State**	Alumni Field • Westfield, MA		**WCSU** 34–20	1,000	
September 17	12:00 PM	**Worcester State**	**Fitchburg State**	Elliot Field • Fitchburg, MA		**WOR** 56–10	1,675	
September 17	12:00 PM	**Bridgewater State**	**Plymouth State**	Panther Field • Plymouth, NH	LEC Network	**PSU** 41–34	1,100	
September 17	1:00 PM	Anna Maria	**Massachusetts Maritime**	Clean Harbors • Buzzards Bay, MA		**L** 14–23	3,012	
September 17	1:30 PM	**Framingham State**	**UMass Dartmouth**	Cressy Field • Dartmouth, MA	LEC Network	**UMD** 46–21	1,921	
^{#}Rankings from AP Poll released prior to game. All times are in EST.

==== Week Four ====
Date	Time	Visiting team	Home team	Site	TV	Result	Attendance	Ref.
September 24	12:00 PM	**Massachusetts Maritime**	**Fitchburg State**	Elliot Field • Fitchburg, MA		**MMA** 38–13	1,244	
September 24	2:00 PM	**Framingham State**	**Westfield State**	Alumni Field • Westfield, MA	ESPN	**FSU** 14–11	1,411	
September 24	2:30 PM	**UMass Dartmouth**	**Worcester State**	John F. Coughlin • Worcester, MA	Youtube	**UMD** 41–20	1,206	
September 24	5:00 PM	**Bridgewater State**	**Western Connecticut**	The WAC • Danbury, CT		**BSU** 40–27	1,903	
^{#}Rankings from AP Poll released prior to game. All times are in EST.

==== Week Five ====
Date	Time	Visiting team	Home team	Site	TV	Result	Attendance	Ref.
September 30	7:00 PM	**Western Connecticut**	**UMass Dartmouth**	Cressy Field • Dartmouth, MA	LEC Network	**UMD** 48–21	2,500	
October 1	12:00 PM	**Plymouth State**	**Framingham State**	Bowditch Field • Framingham, MA		**PSU** 14–9	900	
October 1	12:00 PM	**Westfield State**	**Massachusetts Maritime**	Clean Harbors • Buzzards Bay, MA		**MMA** 20–9	0	
October 1	4:00 PM	**Fitchburg State**	**Bridgewater State**	Swenson Field • Bridgewater, MA		**BSU** 82–0	2,500	
^{#}Rankings from AP Poll released prior to game. All times are in EST.

==== Week Six ====
Date	Time	Visiting team	Home team	Site	TV	Result	Attendance	Ref.
October 6	7:00 PM	**UMass Dartmouth**	**Massachusetts Maritime**	Clean Harbors • Buzzards Bay, MA	Boxcast TV	**UMD** 28–14	1,891	
October 8	12:00 PM	**Worcester State**	**Bridgewater State**	Swenson Field • Bridgewater, MA		**BSU** 45–0	1,600	
October 8	12:00 PM	**Fitchburg State**	**Framingham State**	Bowditch Field • Framingham, MA		**FSU** 47–0	0	
October 8	1:00 PM	**Western Connecticut**	**Plymouth State**	Panther Field • Plymouth, NH	LEC Network	**WCSU** 34–27	2,399	
^{#}Rankings from AP Poll released prior to game. All times are in EST.

==== Week Seven ====
Date	Time	Visiting team	Home team	Site	TV	Result	Attendance	Ref.
October 15	12:00 PM	**Plymouth State**	**Fitchburg State**	Elliot Field • Fitchburg State		**PSU** 42–7	120	
October 15	2:30 PM	**Massachusetts Maritime**	**Worcester State**	John F. Coughlin • Worcester, MA		**MMA** 25–17	670	
October 15	3:000 PM	**Framingham State**	**Western Connecticut**	The WAC • Danbury, CT		**WCSU** 35–14	0	
October 15	4:00 PM	**Westfield State**	**UMass Dartmouth**	Cressy Field • Dartmouth, MA	LEC Network	**UMD** 34–7	2,227	
^{#}Rankings from AP Poll released prior to game. All times are in EST.

==== Week Eight ====
Date	Time	Visiting team	Home team	Site	TV	Result	Attendance	Ref.
October 22	12:00 PM	**Plymouth State**	**Worcester State**	John F. Coughlin • Worcester, MA		**PSU** 56–21	670	
October 22	12:00 PM	**Western Connecticut**	**Massachusetts Maritime**	Clear Harbors • Buzzards Bay, MA		**WSCU** 24–3	300	
October 22	12:00 PM	**UMass Dartmouth**	No. Boxcast TV **Fitchburg State**	Elliot Field • Fitchburg, MA		**UMD** 49–0	0	
October 22	2:00 PM	**Bridgewater State**	**Westfield State**	Alumni Field • Westfield, MA		**BSU** 42–7	1,542	
^{#}Rankings from AP Poll released prior to game. All times are in EST.

==== Week Nine ====
Date	Time	Visiting team	Home team	Site	TV	Result	Attendance	Ref.
October 29	12:00 PM	**Westfield State**	**Plymouth State**	Panther Field • Plymouth, NH	LEC Network	**PSU** 31–22	1,029	
October 29	12:00 PM	**Massachusetts Maritime**	**Framingham State**	Bowditch Field • Framingham, MA		**FSU** 34–10	0	
October 29	12:00 PM	**Bridgewater State**	**UMass Dartmouth**	Cressy Field • Dartmouth, MA	LEC Network	**UMD** 48–7	2,145	
October 29	2:00 PM	**Worcester State**	**Western Connecticut**	The WAC • Danbury, CT		**WCSU** 38–35	0	
^{#}Rankings from AP Poll released prior to game. All times are in EST.

==== Week Ten ====
Date	Time	Visiting team	Home team	Site	TV	Result	Attendance	Ref.
November 5	12:00 PM	**Plymouth State**	**Massachusetts Maritime**	Clean Harbors • Buzzards Bay, MA		**PSU** 21–7	1,891	
November 5	12:00 PM	**Framingham State**	**Bridgewater State**	Swenson Field • Bridgewater, MA		**BSU** 20–19	1,300	
November 5	12:00 PM	**Fitchburg State**	**Western Connecticut**	The WAC • Danbury, CT		**WCSU** 41–21	600	
November 5	12:00 PM	**Westfield State**	**Worcester State**	John F. Coughlin • Worcester, MA (Lancer Game)		**WSU** 28–18	1,325	
^{#}Rankings from AP Poll released prior to game. All times are in EST.

==== Week Eleven ====
Date	Time	Visiting team	Home team	Site	TV	Result	Attendance	Ref.
November 11	7:00 PM	**Worcester State**	**Framingham State**	Bowditch Field • Framingham, MA		**FSU** 21–16	500	
November 12	12:00 PM	**UMass Dartmouth**	**Plymouth State**	Currier Memorial Field • Plymouth, NH (MASCAC Championship)	LEC Network	**UMD** 46–21	1,112	
November 12	12:00 PM	**Fitchburg State**	**Westfield State**	Alumni Field • Westfield, MA		**WST** 50–0	1,000	
November 12	12:00 PM	**Massachusetts Maritime**	**Bridgewater State**	Swenson Field • Bridgewater, MA (43rd Annual Cranberry Bowl)		**BSU** 10–0	1,300	
^{#}Rankings from AP Poll released prior to game. All times are in EST.

== Postseason ==
=== Bowl games ===
Legend
MASCAC win
MASCAC loss

Bowl game	Date	Site	Time (EST)	Television	MASCAC team	Opponent	Score	Attendance
New England Bowl	November 19, 2022	Winkin Complex • Bangor, Maine	12:00 PM		**Plymouth State**	Husson	**W** 21–20	1,100
New England Bowl	November 19, 2022	Swenson Field • Bridgewater, Massachusetts	12:00 PM		**Bridgewater State**	Catholic	**W** 34–24	900
**Division III playoffs**
	November 19, 2022	Jim Butterfield Stadium • Ithaca, New York	12:00 PM	ICTV	**UMass Dartmouth**	No. 9 Ithaca	**L** 20–63	563

Rankings are from CFP rankings. All times Eastern Standard Time. MASCAC teams shown in bold.

== Head to head matchups ==
Head to head
Team	Bridgewater State	Fitchburg State	Framingham State	Massachusetts Maritime	Plymouth State	UMass Dartmouth	Western Connecticut	Westfield State	Worcester State
Bridgewater State	—	**W** 82–0	**W** 20–19	**W** 10–0	L 34–41	L 7–48	**W** 40–27	**W** 42–7	**W** 45–0
Fitchburg State	L 0–82	—	L 0–47	L 0–49	L 13–27	L 0–49	L 21–41	L 0–50	L 10–56
Framingham State	L 19–20	**W** 48–0	—	L 21–46	L 9–14	L 21–46	L 14–35	**W** 14–11	**W** 21–16
Massachusetts Maritime	L 0–10	**W** 49–0	**W** 46–21	—	L 7–21	L 14–28	L 3–24	**W** 20–9	**W** 25–17
Plymouth State	**W** 41–34	**W** 27–13	**W** 14–9	**W** 21–7	—	L 21–46	L 27–34	**W** 31–22	**W** 56–21
UMass Dartmouth	**W** 48–7	**W** 49–0	**W** 46–21	**W** 28–14	**W** 46–21	—	**W** 48–21	**W** 34–7	**W** 41–20
Western Connecticut	L 27–40	**W** 41–21	**W** 35–14	**W** 24–3	**W** 34–27	L 21–48	—	**W** 34–20	**W** 38–35
Westfield State	L 7–42	**W** 50–0	L 11–14	L 9–20	L 22–31	L 7–34	L 20–34	—	**W** 28–18
Worcester State	L 0–45	**W** 56–10	**W** 43–28	L 17–25	L 21–56	L 20–41	L 35–38	L 18–28	—

Updated with the results of all regular season conference games.

== Awards and honors ==
=== Player of the week honors ===
Week	Offensive			Defensive			Special Teams			Rookie		
Week	Player	Team	Position	Player	Team	Position	Player	Team	Position	Player	Team	Position
Week 1	Marvens Jean	UMass Dartmouth	RB	Javien Delgado	UMass Dartmouth	LB	Seth Disalvo	Plymouth State	K	Bearett Henderson	Westfield State	CB
Week 2	John Giller	Western Connecticut	QB	Nosa Uzamere	Western Connecticut	LB	Matthew Farley	Framingham State	K	Colby Pires	Westfield State	QB
Week 3	Dante Aviles-Santos	UMass Dartmouth	QB	JP Mason	UMass Dartmouth	DB	Willie Lombard	Plymouth State	RB	Colby Pires	Westfield State	QB
Week 4	Adam Couch	Bridgewater State	RB	Jaren Alves	Bridgewater State	DB	Shane Drake	Bridgewater State	K/P	Mike Epifano	Massachusetts Maritime	K/P
Week 5	Dante Aviles-Santos	UMass Dartmouth	QB	Evan Wilson	Plymouth State	LB	Joey Naso	Bridgewater State	K	James Cassidy	Massachusetts Maritime	WR
Week 6	John Giller	Western Connecticut	QB	Cully Curran	Framingham State	DB	Anthony Weidtman	Western Connecticut	K	Drew Donovan	Bridgewater State	WR
Week 7	Marc Murphy	Massachusetts Maritime	QB	Hugh Wells	Massachusetts Maritime	DL	Anthony Weidtman	Western Connecticut	K	Kairis Codio	UMass Dartmouth	DL
Week 8	Manny Sanchez	Plymouth State	RB	Gustavo Regalado	Plymouth State	DB	Anthony Weidtman	Western Connecticut	K	Drew Donovan	Bridgewater State	WR
Week 9	Julian Ferguson	Western Connecticut	WR	Evan Wilson	Plymouth State	LB	Seth Disalvo	Plymouth State	K	Charlie Naylor	Massachusetts Maritime	WR
Week 10	Jordan Smith	Westfield State	RB	Brendan Albert	Bridgewater State	LB	Jaicob Tejeda	Western Connecticut	WR	Jordan Smith	Westfield State	RB
Week 10	Jordan Smith	Westfield State	RB	Brendan Albert	Bridgewater State	LB	Jaicob Tejeda	Western Connecticut	WR	Keyshawn McCurdy	Fitchburg State	WR
Week 11	Dante Aviles-Santos	UMass Dartmouth	QB	Steven Silvia	Bridgewater State	LB	Shane Drake	Bridgewater State	K/P	Dylan Zueblis	Westfield State	LB
Final	James Cahoon	Bridgewater State	QB	Luc Normandeau	Plymouth State	DB	Shane Drake	Bridgewater State	K/P	Isaiah Wright	Bridgewater State	RB
Final	Manny Sanchez	Plymouth State	RB	Luc Normandeau	Plymouth State	DB	Shane Drake	Bridgewater State	K/P	Isaiah Wright	Bridgewater State	RB

=== MASCAC Individual Awards ===
The following individuals received postseason honors as voted by the Massachusetts State Collegiate Athletic Conference football coaches at the end of the season.

Award	Player	School
Offensive Player of the Year	Dante Aviles-Santos, QB	UMass Dartmouth
Offensive lineman of the Year	Brian Callery, OG	Framingham State
Offensive Rookie of the Year	Braden Lynn, QB	Plymouth State
Defensive Player of the Year	Steven Silvia, OLB	Bridgewater State
Defensive Rookie of the Year	Daniel Oloyede, DL	Framingham State
BSN Coach of the Year	Mark Robichaud	UMass Dartmouth

=== All-conference teams ===
The following players earned All-MASCAC honors.

**First Team**

Position	Player	Class	Team
**First Team Offense**
QB	Dante Aviles-Santos	Jr.	UMD
RB	Adam Couch	Sr.	BSU
RB	Chad Blaszky	Sr.	WCSU
FB	Thanos Boulukos	Gr.	PSU
WR	Angel Sanchez	So.	UMD
WR	Julian Ferguson	So.	WCSU
TE	Jalen Kopecky	So.	BSU
OL	Andrew Paulus	Sr.	UMD
OL	Brian Callery	Jr.	FSU
OL	Bryan Lawton	So.	FSU
OL	Teddy Fellows	So.	PSU
OL	Brandon DiChiaro	Sr.	UMD
**First Team Defense**
DL	Mack Brown	Sr.	MMA
DL	Hugh Wells	Sr.	MMA
DL	Emmanuel Ughu	Jr.	PSU
DL	Raquell Davis	Sr.	WCSU
LB	Javien Delgado	Sr.	UMD
LB	Tyler Cooley	So.	WST
LB	Brendan Albert	Sr.	BSU
LB	Steven Silvia	Sr.	BSU
DB	Jaren Alves	Sr.	BSU
DB	Cully Curran	Sr.	FSU
DB	Moise Nazaire	Jr.	FSU
DB	Cobey Williamson	Sr.	MMA
**First Team Special Teams**
PK	Matthew Farley	So.	FSU
P	Shane Drake	Jr.	BSU
RT	Zach Soriano	Jr.	WCSU
RT	Christian Julian	Jr.	WST

**Second Team**

Position	Player	Class	Team
**Second Team Offense**
QB	James Cahoon	Sr.	BSU
RB	Devaun Ford	Jr.	FSU
RB	Manny Sanchez	Sr.	PSU
FB	David Ross	Gr.	WCSU
WR	Kyle Torres	Sr.	BSU
WR	Andrew Brightman	Jr.	MMA
WR	Keenan Little	Sr.	UMD
TE	Bryan Warren	Sr.	PSU
OL	Mattheau Gaudet	Gr.	BSU
OL	Matt Beyer	Sr.	BSU
OL	James Mauro	Sr.	PSU
OL	Alexander Byron	Sr.	BSU
OL	Bryant Bowman	So.	FSU
**Second Team Defense**
DL	Brian Campagna	Sr.	BSU
DL	Daniel Oloyede	Fr.	FSU
DL	Marcus Elysee	Gr.	UMD
DL	Sam Duah Jr.	Sr.	WSU
LB	Evan Wilson	So.	PSU
LB	Nosa Uzamere	Sr.	WCSU
LB	Nick Ashley	Sr.	FSU
LB	Sam Alicea	So.	UMD
DB	Quinn Girard	Sr.	PSU
DB	Logan Chappell	Jr.	UMD
DB	Peter Bencivengo	Sr.	WCSU
DB	Noah Peterson	Sr.	WSU
**Second Team Special Teams**
PK	Anthony Weidtman	Jr.	WCSU
P	Jack Mulligan	Jr.	MMA
RT	Jaden Lewis	Fr.	FSU

=== All-Academic ===
- Bridgewater State: Brendan Albert, Colin Anzeveno, Ryan Burchard, Dustin Burkle, James Cahoon, Brian Campagna, Chonlee Cine, Ryan Coonan, Gavin Cooney, Adam Couch, Brandon Daley, Connor Daley, Andre Domond, Adam Ferrara, James Fontaine, Zachary Gamelin, Mattheau Guadet, Sean Howe, Benjamin Landry, Josh Ligor, Robert Marshall, Jack McCarthy, Benjamin McMahon, Brandon Medeiros, Joey Naso, Marvell Nicholson, Michael Nocera, Ewan Oliveira, Nathan Oliver, William Pointer, SP Pragano, Patrick Quinn, Zachary Souza, Aiden Tremblay, Jonah Varallo, Anton Vasquez, Mitchell Weston
- Fitchburg State: Amzie Hinkley, Calvin Guillaume, Cameron Monette, Christopher Emslie, Dylan Cosner, Elijah McKnight, Frank Opoku, Giancarlo Marazzo-Henry, Jakob Lufkin, John McGarry, Keyshawn McCurdy, Logan Perez, Nicholas Notenboom
- Framingham State: Thiago Andrade, Teaghin Andre, Nick Ashley, John Burke, Brian Callery, Mick Coronel, Cully Curran, Marquis DosSantos, Paul Goggin, Nick Gordon, Augustus Granata, Tishay Johnson Jr., Bryan Lawton, Nick Marcinowski, Cole Moretti, Nolan Mulachy, Barry Nangle, Alexander Ruppert, Terry Smith, Zach Walker
- Massachusetts Maritime: Jack Mulligan, Liam Hines, William Eltringham, Mark Imparato, Nicolas Ford, Owen Roth, Devon Krajewski, Edward Barlage, Mac Kromenhoek, James Cassidy, Leo Allgaier, Ian Curvelo, Luke Maffeo, Hunter Lassere, William Gorry, Andrew Longwater, William Horlbogen, Hugh Wells, Liam Clayton, Daniel Short, Zach Sanoussi, Mack Brown, Samuel Cassidy, Zachary Maffeo, Jacob Nutter, Nick Gramoli, Conor McCormick, Travis VanDinter, Andrew Brightman, Luke Dawson, Evan Vieira, Jonah Mitchell, Jershawn Freeman, Jacob Umberhind, Marc Murphy, Cole Keefe, Cobey Williamson, Nikos Biskaduros, Mason Erickson, Joseph Grelli
- Plymouth State: Chauncey Alado, Kayden Baillargeon, Kyle Baker, Cooper Bartlett, Sam Bolinsky, Thanos Boulukos, Nikos Bouzakis, Colton Burrows, Frank Capaldo, Sam Cerqueira, Kyle Chamberlin, Mitchell Cripps, Collin Crowe, Jake Currier, Ryan Fleming, Sam Fleming, Alex Flynn, Jack Glanville, Tyler Gleifert, Matthew Griffing, Shawn Harrington, Jyaire Hatcher, Zach Herman, Zach Hodge, Ruchan Karagoz, AJ Laccona, Dylan Leonard, Mikey Levesque, Braden Lynn, Jack Marsden, Shea McClellan, Troy Muldoon, Luc Normandeau, Keegan O'Connor, Christian Paillet, Charlie Palmer, Michael Pesiridis, Tanner Plourde, Jon Proia, Sean Quinn, Nicholas Rendon, Jake Richards, Patrick Rush, Kevin Salvatore, Manny Sanchezm, Nick Savariego, Derrick Shepherd, Gannon Stewart, Dylan Szostak, Mike Terrazzano, Emmanuel Ughu, Cooper Varano, Sam Weidemier, Cameron Wesse, Evan Wilson
- UMass Dartmouth: Dylan Bradley, Colby Briggs, Jonathan Brightman, Easten Coleman, Brandon DiChiaro, Connor Donohue, Collin Farr, Jacob Furtado, Che'Saih Hill-Gore, Matt Kirrane, Jaydon Lame, Jeffy Le, J.P. Mason, Jason Motta, Andrew Paulus, Owen Quigley, Alex Santini, Jason Scott, Jake Sioch, Michael Vincent, Liam Whaley
- Western Connecticut: Patrick Adams, Jordan Agosto, Daniel Barry, David Boatswain, Daniel Chalghin, Andrew Colletti, Riley De Meo, Charles Demartino, Devin Demetres, Michael Dicostanzo, George Doherty, Matthew Forti, Nicholas Gambino, Michael Gargano, Amir Gharbi, Aidan Hanley-Piri, John-Paul Hernandez, Stephen Johnson, Gavin Jones-Phillips, Kieran Kelly, Elias Koukoulis, Brian Lombardo, Stephen Macri, Michael Matich, Donovan Miller, Dalton Modehn, Caleb Nimo-Sefah, Travis O'Neill, Kenneth Okoroafor, Marcus Osieczkowski, Luke Pappalardo, Mason Phuong, Troy Pomykala, Alexis Reyes, Dominic Rienzi, Brandon Rigdon, Zach Soriano, Joshua Sote, Jacob St. Louis, Owen Stark, Kirk Stevenson, Corey Tehe, Nicholas Troy, Nosakhare Uzamere, Ryan Van Dyke, Alex Vita, Elijah Washington, Anthony Weidtman, Dylan Wilson, Jaedon Wolfe, Kevin Wood
- Westfield State: Julian Bass, Dominic Carme, Frederick Centrella, Cameron Danahy, Brendan DeBarber, Kyle Dodge, Michael Foley, Tobias Gaulden Wheeler, Nikolaos Giotsas, Christopher Greene, Anthony Messore, Timothy O'Connor, Joel Perez Guzman, Colby Pires, Ethan Russell, Blake Simpson, Jordan Smith, Peter Spinale, Zachary Thetreault, Malachi Wright
- Worcester State: Dominic Annese, Cameron Ayotte, Layne Benton, Samuel Brewer, Mason Broyles, Kevin Byrnes, Daniel Diverdi, Samuel Duah, Wafic Ellakis, Dylan Hall, Micah Haynes, Brodie Jacques, Trever Johnson, Ryan Justin, Jake Lajoie, Gavin LePage, Tyler Leino, Michael Loveless, Michael Mahoney, Curt Marshall, Jamison Metcalf, Austin Michaelson, Matthew O'Connor, Noah Peterson, Calvin Polchlopek, Santiago Rodriguez-D'atr, Melke Shabo, Justin Sneed, Logan Sylvester, Alexander Thibeault, Caleb Thompson, Drew Von Klock, Kyle Wall, Nathan Winco
