= Peter Mazzaferro =

American football player and coach (1930–2025)

Biographical details
- Born: June 24, 1930; Torrington, Connecticut, U.S.
- Died: 30 May 2025 (aged 94); Bridgewater, Massachusetts, U.S.

Playing career

Football
- 1952–1953: Centre

Coaching career (HC unless noted)

Football
- 1950s: Springfield (assistant)
- 1959–1962: Waynesburg
- 1963: Curry
- 1965: Beaver Falls HS (PA)
- 1966–1967: Bridgewater State (assistant)
- 1968–1986: Bridgewater State
- 1987: Milton Academy (MA) (assistant)
- 1988–2004: Bridgewater State
- 2005: Curry (QB/WR)
- 2006: Stonehill (TE)

Basketball
- 1959–1963: Waynesburg

Head coaching record
- Overall: 209–158–11 (college football); 14–66 (college basketball)
- Bowls: 0–2
- Tournaments: 0–2 (NCAA D-III playoffs)

Accomplishments and honors

Championships
- 5 NEFC (1989, 1992, 1997, 1999–2000)

Pete "Papa Bear" Mazzaferro (June 24, 1930 – May 30, 2025) was an American football coach. With the exception of the 1987 season, he was the head football coach at Bridgewater State College in Bridgewater, Massachusetts, from 1968 to 2004. He compiled a career college football head coaching record of 209–158–11.

== Centre College ==
Mazzaferro was born in Torrington, Connecticut, and attended Centre College in Danville, Kentucky. He played for the Centre Praying Colonels football team and also competed in track. He graduated from Centre in 1954.

== Coaching career ==
=== Early years ===
Mazzaferro began his career coaching eight-man high school football. In the 1950s, while pursuing a master's degree at Springfield College, Mazzaferro helped coach the freshman football team. The center on the Springfield team was Dick MacPherson, who went on to be inducted into the College Football Hall of Fame for his work as the head football coach at Syracuse University.

From 1959 to 1962, Mazzaferro was the head football coach at Waynesburg University in southwestern Pennsylvania. He had a four-year record of 12–19–3 at Waynesburg. He was also the head basketball coach at Waynesburg from 1959 to 1963, compiling a record of 14–66.

In the fall of 1963, Mazzaferro moved to Curry College in Milton, Massachusetts. He was the head football coach at Curry for one year and had a record there of 2–2–1.

In 1965, Mazzaferro coached football at Beaver Falls High School in Beaver Falls, Pennsylvania.

=== Bridgewater State ===
In 1966, Mazzaferro became an assistant football coach at Bridgewater State College, the largest of Massachusetts' nine state colleges outside of the UMass system. After two years as an assistant to Ed Swenson, Mazzaferro took over as the head coach of the Bridgewater Bears football team in 1968. He remained as the head football coach at Bridgewater for 36 years. He also served as a tenured faculty member at Bridgewater in the Department of Movement Arts, Health Promotion, and Leisure Studies. During his time as head coach, Bridgewater won or shared the New England Football Conference championship in 1968, 1969, 1989, 1997, 1999 and 2000, along with Massachusetts State College Athletic Conference championships in 1986, 1989, 1990, 1991, 1992, 1993, 1994, 1998, 1999 and 2000. He compiled a record of 195–136–7 at Bridgewater.

After his first 17 years as head football coach at Bridgewater, Mazzaferro was removed from that position for the 1987 football season due to a new policy enacted by university president Gerard T. Indelicato. Indelicato decided that faculty members, including Mazzaferro, could not receive "release time." Mazzaferro had been receiving release time to serve as the school's head football coach for 17 years. Mazzaferro applied to keep his job, but he did not make the list of finalists. Mazzaferro noted at the time, "You can't coach forever, but I'd hate to have to go out that way." Mazzaferro sued the college for age discrimination. While the suit was pending, Bridgewater's record fell to 4–5, and Indelicato was forced to resign and pleaded guilty to misappropriating government funds. Mazzaferro dropped his lawsuit and was reinstated as football coach in 1988, and served another 19 years as the head football coach after being reinstated.

After returning to the head coaching position, Mazzaferro restored the program's winning tradition with 14 consecutive winning seasons from 1988 to 2001. In 1989, Bridgewater had a 9–0 regular season before losing a close game in the ECAC Division III North finals. The Providence Journal called it the school's "finest season ever." Bridgewater's defense in 1989 was ranked No. 1 nationally in Division III rushing defense, allowing only 32.1 yards a game and less than a yard per carry. Mazzaferro said at the time, "I'm extra proud of our defense. We play a simple 4-4 defense, which is what Notre Dame used a hundred years ago, and I love it. Our guys have it down pat and know what to do. We're not big or fancy, but we get the job done. ... This is a special team in my book."

In the four years from 1989 to 1992, Mazzaferro's teams ran a successful veer offense along with its 4–4 defense and compiled a record of 34–5–1, including an undefeated 1992 season. In 1999, Mazzaferro's team finished the regular season 10–0.

Mazzaferro was affectionately known at the school as "Papa Bear." In 2003, Bridgewater athletic director John Harper noted, "He's dedicated his life to BSC." In August 2002, sports writer Paul Kenney wrote a feature story on Mazzaferro, noting that he worked at "a cluttered state-issued gray metal desk, located in a basement office of the gymnasium" with only small black metal nameplate reading simply, "Peter Mazzaferro Head Coach." The writer suggested that, with Mazzaferro's achievements, "the word 'legend' might be a more deserving moniker for that nameplate."

In September 2003, the Boston Herald published a story on the 73-year-old coach. The Herald noted, "When Bridgewater State coach Pete Mazzaferro glances across the football field, his mind often drifts back through 40 years of coaching, recalling opposing counterparts like so many gridiron ghosts of seasons past." His opponents included Ed Sherman (College Football Hall of Fame coach at Muskingum College), Harold Burry (College Football Hall of Fame coach at Westminster College), and Paul Pasqualoni (from Western Connecticut). In his time as a high school coach, Mazzaferro had also coached against College Football Hall of Fame coach Lee Tressel (father of Jim Tressel) when Tressel worked at Massillon Washington High School in Ohio. Looking back on his career, Mazzaferro told the Herald, "You go through a lot. You get hung in effigy or the (school) president attacks you on the field. I've gone through it all. I've always been interested in X's and O's but it's the kids you coach, they're like a family."

Mazzaferro achieved his 200th career win during the 2003 season. He retired from coaching after the 2004 season at age 74. Upon being named the new head coach, Chuck Denune said, "I'm stepping in the footsteps of a giant. His success was tremendous, and he has done a lot for me. I have utmost respect for him. I'm following a legend, and that's one of the most exciting things about this."

=== Overall coaching record and awards ===
In 41 years as a head coach, Mazzaferro compiled an overall record of 209 wins, 157 losses, and 11 ties. Mazzaferro has received many awards for his contributions to college football including the following:

- Mazzaferro was named the 1989 New England Football Writers Division II-III Coach of the Year.
- In 1998, Mazzaferro received the Carens Award for Outstanding Contribution to New England football.
- In 1999, he was recognized by the New England Football Writers as the Coach of the Year for Divisions II and III. He also received a lifetime achievement award from the All-American Football Foundation and was named the Division III Regional Coach of the Year by the American Football Coaches Association.
- In 2004, Mazzaferro received the Ron Burton Distinguished American Award from the local chapter of the National Football Foundation and Hall of Fame.

=== Curry College assistant ===
Mazzaferro came out of retirement in August 2005 to accept an assistant coaching position at Curry College working with the quarterbacks and wide receivers. Curry head coach Steve Nelson noted at the time, "I think it's going to be good for our team, and it's going to be good for Pete. He fits in terrifically here. The kids really like him, and he's got a lot of stories to tell."

== Death ==
Mazzaferro died on May 30, 2025, at the age of 94.

== Head coaching record ==
=== College football ===
Year	Team	Overall	Conference	Standing	Bowl/playoffs
Waynesburg Yellow Jackets (West Penn Conference) (1959–1962)
1959	Waynesburg	1–6–2	0–3–1	T–5th	
1960	Waynesburg	0–8–1	0–4–1	T–5th	
1961	Waynesburg	6–2	2–2	T–2nd	
1962	Waynesburg	5–3	3–1	3rd	
Waynesburg:		12–19–3	5–10–2		
Curry Colonels (Independent) (1963)
1963	Curry	2–2–1			
Curry:		2–2–1			
Bridgewater State Bears (New England Football Conference) (1968–1986)
1968	Bridgewater State	5–3			
1969	Bridgewater State	3–4–1			
1970	Bridgewater State	0–8			
1971	Bridgewater State	3–6			
1972	Bridgewater State	4–5	2–2	5th	
1973	Bridgewater State	5–5	2–2	T–3rd	
1974	Bridgewater State	6–4	4–3	T–5th	
1975	Bridgewater State	7–3	5–3	T–4th	
1976	Bridgewater State	6–3	5–3	T–2nd	
1977	Bridgewater State	6–3	5–3	T–2nd	
1978	Bridgewater State	3–6	3–5	7th	
1979	Bridgewater State	3–5–1	3–5–1	8th	
1980	Bridgewater State	5–3–1	5–3–1	T–4th	
1981	Bridgewater State	3–6	3–6	T–7th	
1982	Bridgewater State	5–3–1	5–3–1	4th	
1983	Bridgewater State	4–5	4–5	T–5th	
1984	Bridgewater State	2–7	2–7	T–7th	
1985	Bridgewater State	5–4	5–4	3rd	
1986	Bridgewater State	6–1–2	6–1–2	4rd	
Bridgewater State Bears (New England Football Conference) (1988–2004)
1988	Bridgewater State	5–4	3–3	T–4th (South)	
1989	Bridgewater State	9–1	6–0	1st (South)	L ECAC North Bowl
1990	Bridgewater State	8–2	6–0	1st (South)	
1991	Bridgewater State	8–2	6–0	1st (South)	
1992	Bridgewater State	9–1–1	8–0	1st	L ECAC Northeast Bowl
1993	Bridgewater State	5–5	5–3	T–3rd	
1994	Bridgewater State	6–4	6–2	T–3rd	
1995	Bridgewater State	6–4	6–2	T–2nd	
1996	Bridgewater State	5–5	4–4	T–5th	
1997	Bridgewater State	7–3	7–1	T–1st	
1998	Bridgewater State	7–3	7–1	1st (Red)	
1999	Bridgewater State	10–1	6–0	1st (Red)	L NCAA Division III First Round
2000	Bridgewater State	8–3	5–1	T–1st (Bogan)	L NCAA Division III First Round
2001	Bridgewater State	5–4	3–3	3rd (Bogan)	
2002	Bridgewater State	4–5	3–3	4th (Bogan)	
2003	Bridgewater State	6–3	4–2	3rd (Bogan)	
2004	Bridgewater State	6–3	4–2	T–2nd (Bogan)	
Bridgewater State:		195–137–7			
Total:		209–158–11			
National championship Conference title Conference division title or championship game berth

== See also ==
- List of college football career coaching wins leaders
