= Massachusetts Maritime Buccaneers football =

College football team

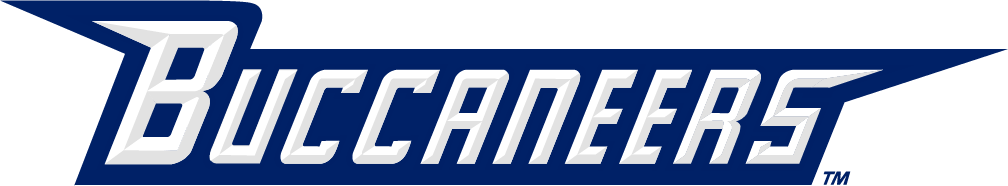
- First season: 1973; 53 years ago
- Athletic director: Mike Kelley
- Head coach: Jeremy Cameron; 20th season, 70–127 (.355)
- Location: Buzzards Bay, Massachusetts
- Stadium: Clean Harbors Stadium (capacity: 2,300)
- NCAA division: Division III
- Conference: MASCAC
- Colors: Blue and yellow
- All-time record: 222–286–3 (.437)
- Bowl record: 0–1 (.000)

Conference championships
- 2
- Rivalries: Maritime (Chowder Bowl); Bridgewater State (Cranberry Bowl)
- Mascot: Buccaneer
- Website: mmabucs.com

The Massachusetts Maritime Buccaneers football team represents Massachusetts Maritime Academy in college football at the NCAA Division III level. The Buccaneers are members of the Massachusetts State Collegiate Athletic Conference (MASCAC), fielding its team in the MASCAC since 2013. The Buccaneers play their home games at Clean Harbors Stadium in Buzzards Bay, Massachusetts.

Their head coach is Jeremy Cameron, who took over the position for the 2005 season.

== Conference affiliations ==
- New England Football Conference (1973–2012)
- Massachusetts State Collegiate Athletic Conference (2013–present)

== Championships ==
=== Conference championships ===
Massachusetts Maritime claims 2 conference titles, the most recent of which came in 1983.

Year	Conference	Overall Record	Conference Record	Coach
1977	New England Football Conference	8–1	7–1	Don Ruggeri
1983†	New England Football Conference	8–2	8–1	Don Ruggeri

† Co-champions

=== Bowl games ===
Massachusetts Maritime has participated in one bowl game, and has a record of 0–1.

Season	Coach	Bowl	Opponent	Result
1983	Don Ruggeri	ECAC Bowl	Plymouth	L 24–35

== List of head coaches ==
=== Key ===
Key to symbols in coaches list
General		Overall		Conference		Postseason (Note: Although the first Rose Bowl Game was played in 1902, it has been continuously played since the 1916 game, and is recognized as the oldest bowl game by the NCAA. "—" indicates any season prior to 1916 when postseason games were not played.)	
No.	Order of coaches (Note: A running total of the number of head coaches, with coaches who served separate tenures being counted only once. Interim head coaches are represented with "Int" and are not counted in the running total. "—" indicates the team played but either without a coach or no coach is on record. "X" indicates an interim year without play.)	GC	Games coached	CW	Conference wins	PW	Postseason wins
DC	Division championships	OW	Overall wins	CL	Conference losses	PL	Postseason losses
CC	Conference championships	OL	Overall losses	CT	Conference ties	PT	Postseason ties
NC	National championships	OT	Overall ties (Note: Overtime rules in college football were introduced in 1996, making ties impossible in the period since.)	C%	Conference winning percentage		
†	Elected to the College Football Hall of Fame	O%	Overall winning percentage (Note: When computing the win–loss percentage, a tie counts as half a win and half a loss.)				

=== Coaches ===
List of head football coaches showing season(s) coached, overall records, conference records, postseason records, championships and selected awards
No.	Name	Season(s)	GC	OW	OL	OT	O%	CW	CL	CT	C%	PW	PL	PT	DC	CC	NC	Awards
1	Don Ruggeri	1973–2000	258	146	112	1	0.566	–	–	–	–	–	–	–	–	1	–	–
2	Joe Domingos	2001–2004	36	6	30	0	0.167	–	–	–	–	–	–	–	–	–	–	–
3	Jeremy Cameron	2005–present	161	59	102	0	0.366	–	–	–	–	–	–	–	–	–	–	–

== Year-by-year results ==
National champions	Conference champions	Bowl game berth	Playoff berth

Season	Year	Head Coach	Association	Division	Conference	Record							Postseason	Final ranking
Season	Year	Head Coach	Association	Division	Conference	Overall			Conference				Postseason	Final ranking
Season	Year	Head Coach	Association	Division	Conference	Win	Loss	Tie	Finish	Win	Loss	Tie	Postseason	Final ranking
Massachusetts Maritime Buccaneers
1973	1973	Don Ruggeri	NCAA	Division III	NEFC	5	3	0	–	3	3	0	—	—
1974	1974	Don Ruggeri	NCAA	Division III	NEFC	2	7	0	–	2	6	0	—	—
1975	1975	Don Ruggeri	NCAA	Division III	NEFC	2	6	0	–	2	6	0	—	—
1976	1976	Don Ruggeri	NCAA	Division III	NEFC	5	3	0	–	5	3	0	—	—
1977	1977	Don Ruggeri	NCAA	Division III	NEFC	8	1	0	–	7	1	0	Conference champions	—
1978	1978	Don Ruggeri	NCAA	Division III	NEFC	6	3	0	–	5	3	0	—	—
1979	1979	Don Ruggeri	NCAA	Division III	NEFC	5	4	0	–	5	4	0	—	—
1980	1980	Don Ruggeri	NCAA	Division III	NEFC	6	3	0	–	6	3	0	—	—
1981	1981	Don Ruggeri	NCAA	Division III	NEFC	6	3	0	–	6	3	0	—	—
1982	1982	Don Ruggeri	NCAA	Division III	NEFC	7	2	0	–	7	2	0	—	—
1983	1983	Don Ruggeri	NCAA	Division III	NEFC	8	2	0	–	8	1	0	Conference champions	—
1984	1984	Don Ruggeri	NCAA	Division III	NEFC	6	3	0	–	6	3	0	—	—
1985	1985	Don Ruggeri	NCAA	Division III	NEFC	4	4	0	–	4	4	0	—	—
1986	1986	Don Ruggeri	NCAA	Division III	NEFC	5	4	1	–	5	4	1	—	—
1987	1987	Don Ruggeri	NCAA	Division III	NEFC	4	4	0	–	4	4	0	—	—
1988	1988	Don Ruggeri	NCAA	Division III	NEFC	5	4	0	–	5	4	0	—	—
1989	1989	Don Ruggeri	NCAA	Division III	NEFC	2	7	0	–	2	7	0	—	—
1990	1990	Don Ruggeri	NCAA	Division III	NEFC	3	6	0	–	3	6	0	—	—
1991	1991	Don Ruggeri	NCAA	Division III	NEFC	6	3	0	–	6	3	0	—	—
1992	1992	Don Ruggeri	NCAA	Division III	NEFC	6	3	0	–	6	2	0	—	—
1993	1993	Don Ruggeri	NCAA	Division III	NEFC	4	6	0	–	3	5	0	—	—
1994	1994	Don Ruggeri	NCAA	Division III	NEFC	4	6	0	–	3	5	0	—	—
1995	1995	Don Ruggeri	NCAA	Division III	NEFC	7	2	0	–	6	2	0	—	—
1996	1996	Don Ruggeri	NCAA	Division III	NEFC	6	4	0	–	5	3	0	—	—
1997	1997	Don Ruggeri	NCAA	Division III	NEFC	3	7	0	–	3	5	0	—	—
1998	1998	Don Ruggeri	NCAA	Division III	NEFC	6	4	0	–	4	2	0	—	—
1999	1999	Don Ruggeri	NCAA	Division III	NEFC	8	2	0	–	5	2	0	—	—
2000	2000	Don Ruggeri	NCAA	Division III	NEFC	5	4	0	–	4	4	0	—	—
2001	2001	Joe Domingos	NCAA	Division III	NEFC	2	7	0	–	2	4	0	—	—
2002	2002	Joe Domingos	NCAA	Division III	NEFC	1	8	0	–	1	6	0	—	—
2003	2003	Joe Domingos	NCAA	Division III	NEFC	2	7	0	–	2	4	0	—	—
2004	2004	Joe Domingos	NCAA	Division III	NEFC	1	8	0	–	1	5	0	—	—
2005	2005	Jeremy Cameron	NCAA	Division III	NEFC	0	9	0	–	0	6	0	—	—
2006	2006	Jeremy Cameron	NCAA	Division III	NEFC	3	6	0	–	2	5	0	—	—
2007	2007	Jeremy Cameron	NCAA	Division III	NEFC	3	7	0	–	1	6	0	—	—
2008	2008	Jeremy Cameron	NCAA	Division III	NEFC	0	10	0	–	0	7	0	—	—
2009	2009	Jeremy Cameron	NCAA	Division III	NEFC	3	7	0	–	2	5	0	—	—
2010	2010	Jeremy Cameron	NCAA	Division III	NEFC	5	5	0	–	4	3	0	—	—
2011	2011	Jeremy Cameron	NCAA	Division III	NEFC	5	4	0	–	3	4	0	—	—
2012	2012	Jeremy Cameron	NCAA	Division III	NEFC	5	4	0	–	4	3	0	—	—
2013	2013	Jeremy Cameron	NCAA	Division III	MASCAC	5	5	0	–	3	5	0	—	—
2014	2014	Jeremy Cameron	NCAA	Division III	MASCAC	4	6	0	–	3	5	0	—	—
2015	2015	Jeremy Cameron	NCAA	Division III	MASCAC	4	6	0	–	3	5	0	—	—
2016	2016	Jeremy Cameron	NCAA	Division III	MASCAC	4	6	0	–	3	5	0	—	—
2017	2017	Jeremy Cameron	NCAA	Division III	MASCAC	2	8	0	–	1	7	0	—	—
2018	2018	Jeremy Cameron	NCAA	Division III	MASCAC	2	8	0	–	1	7	0	—	—
2019	2019	Jeremy Cameron	NCAA	Division III	MASCAC	6	4	0	–	4	4	0	—	—
Season canceled due to COVID-19
2021	2021	Jeremy Cameron	NCAA	Division III	MASCAC	4	6	0	–	3	5	0	—	—
2022	2022	Jeremy Cameron	NCAA	Division III	MASCAC	3	7	0	–	3	5	0	—	—
2023	2023	Jeremy Cameron	NCAA	Division III	MASCAC								—	—

== See also ==
- Massachusetts Maritime Buccaneers
