= Don Ruggeri =

American football coach (born 1940)

Biographical details
- Born: c. 1940 (age 85–86); Belmont, Massachusetts, U.S.

Playing career
- 1959–1962: Springfield

Coaching career (HC unless noted)
- 1963–?: Falmouth HS (MA) (assistant)
- ?–1972: Falmouth HS (MA)
- 1973–2000: Massachusetts Maritime

Head coaching record
- Overall: 146–109–2 (college)

Accomplishments and honors

Championships
- 2 NEFC (1977, 1983)

Don Ruggeri (born c. 1939) is an American former football coach. He was the head coach for the Massachusetts Maritime Buccaneers football team from 1973 until his retirement in 2000. He also coached at Falmouth High School from 1963 to 1972. He played college football for Springfield.

== Head coaching record ==
=== College ===
| Year | Team | Overall | Conference | Standing | Bowl/playoffs | AFCA^{#} |
|---|---|---|---|---|---|---|
Massachusetts Maritime Buccaneers (NCAA Division III independent) (1973)
| 1973 | Massachusetts Maritime | 5–3 | | | | |
Massachusetts Maritime Buccaneers (New England Football Conference) (1974–2000)
| 1974 | Massachusetts Maritime | 3–6 | 2–6 | 7th | | |
| 1975 | Massachusetts Maritime | 2–6 | 2–6 | 7th | | |
| 1976 | Massachusetts Maritime | 5–3 | 5–3 | T–2nd | | |
| 1977 | Massachusetts Maritime | 8–1 | 7–1 | 1st | | |
| 1978 | Massachusetts Maritime | 6–3 | 5–3 | T–3rd | | |
| 1979 | Massachusetts Maritime | 5–4 | 5–4 | 4th | | |
| 1980 | Massachusetts Maritime | 6–3 | 6–3 | 3rd | | |
| 1981 | Massachusetts Maritime | 6–3 | 6–3 | 3rd | | |
| 1982 | Massachusetts Maritime | 7–2 | 7–2 | 2nd | | |
| 1983 | Massachusetts Maritime | 8–2 | 8–1 | T–1st | | |
| 1984 | Massachusetts Maritime | 6–3 | 6–3 | 4th | | |
| 1985 | Massachusetts Maritime | 5–4–1 | 4–4 | T–4th | | |
| 1986 | Massachusetts Maritime | 5–4–1 | 5–4–1 | 6th | | |
| 1987 | Massachusetts Maritime | 4–4 | 3–2 | T–2nd (South) | | |
| 1988 | Massachusetts Maritime | 5–4 | 4–2 | T–2nd (South) | | |
| 1989 | Massachusetts Maritime | 2–7 | 2–4 | T–5th (South) | | |
| 1990 | Massachusetts Maritime | 3–6 | 2–4 | T–4th (South) | | |
| 1991 | Massachusetts Maritime | 6–3 | 4–2 | T–2nd (South) | | |
| 1992 | Massachusetts Maritime | 6–3 | 6–2 | 2nd | | |
| 1993 | Massachusetts Maritime | 4–6 | 3–5 | T–6th | | |
| 1994 | Massachusetts Maritime | 4–6 | 3–5 | 6th | | |
| 1995 | Massachusetts Maritime | 7–2 | 6–2 | T–2nd | | |
| 1996 | Massachusetts Maritime | 6–4 | 5–3 | T–3rd | | |
| 1997 | Massachusetts Maritime | 3–7 | 3–5 | T–6th | | |
| 1998 | Massachusetts Maritime | 6–4 | 4–2 | 3rd (Red) | | |
| 1999 | Massachusetts Maritime | 8–2 | 5–1 | 2nd (Red) | | |
| 2000 | Massachusetts Maritime | 5–4 | 3–3 | 4th (Bogan) | | |
| Massachusetts Maritime: | | 146–109–2 | 120–85–1 | | | |
| Total: | | 146–109–2 | | | | |
National championship Conference title Conference division title or championship game berth
