= Jeremy Cameron (American football) =

American football coach

Current position
- Title: Head coach
- Team: Massachusetts Maritime
- Conference: MASCAC
- Record: 70–127

Biographical details
- Education: Springfield College (1997)

Coaching career (HC unless noted)
- 1998: Dean (QB/RB)
- 1999: Bryant (WR)
- 2000–2002: Wagner (QB/WR)
- 2003: Poly Prep (NY) (OC)
- 2004: Wagner (OC)
- 2005–present: Massachusetts Maritime

Head coaching record
- Overall: 70–127

Jeremy Cameron is an American college football coach. He is the head football coach for the Massachusetts Maritime Academy, a position he has held since 2005. He previously coached for Dean, Bryant, Wagner, and Poly Prep.

== Head coaching record ==
Year	Team	Overall	Conference	Standing	Bowl/playoffs
Massachusetts Maritime Buccaneers (New England Football Conference) (2005–2012)
2005	Massachusetts Maritime	0–10	0–7	7th (Bogan)	
2006	Massachusetts Maritime	3–6	2–5	6th (Bogan)	
2007	Massachusetts Maritime	3–7	1–6	T–7th (Bogan)	
2008	Massachusetts Maritime	0–10	0–7	8th (Bogan)	
2009	Massachusetts Maritime	3–7	2–5	T–6th (Bogan)	
2010	Massachusetts Maritime	5–5	4–3	T–3rd (Bogan)	
2011	Massachusetts Maritime	5–4	3–4	5th (Bogan)	
2012	Massachusetts Maritime	5–4	4–3	T–3rd (Bogan)	
Massachusetts Maritime Buccaneers (Massachusetts State Collegiate Athletic Conference) (2013–present)
2013	Massachusetts Maritime	5–5	3–5	T–6th	
2014	Massachusetts Maritime	4–6	3–5	T–6th	
2015	Massachusetts Maritime	4–6	3–5	T–6th	
2016	Massachusetts Maritime	4–6	3–5	T–6th	
2017	Massachusetts Maritime	2–8	1–7	9th	
2018	Massachusetts Maritime	2–8	1–7	T–8th	
2019	Massachusetts Maritime	6–4	4–4	T–5th	
2020–21	No team—COVID-19				
2021	Massachusetts Maritime	4–6	3–5	T–6th	
2022	Massachusetts Maritime	3–7	3–5	6th	
2023	Massachusetts Maritime	2–8	2–6	7th	
2024	Massachusetts Maritime	5–5	5–4	T–3rd	
2025	Massachusetts Maritime	5–5	5–4	T–5th	
2026	Massachusetts Maritime	0–0	0–0		
Massachusetts Maritime:		70–127	52–102		
Total:		70–127			
