= Joe Domingos =

American football coach (born 1943)

Biographical details
- Born: c. 1943 (age 82–83)

Playing career
- c. 1960s: Bridgewater State

Coaching career (HC unless noted)
- ?: New Bedford HS (MA) (assistant)
- ?–1972: Falmouth HS (MA) (DC)
- 1973–2000: Massachusetts Maritime (DC/ST/OL)
- 2001–2004: Massachusetts Maritime

Head coaching record
- Overall: 6–30

Joseph F. Domingos (born c. 1943) is an American college football coach. He was the head football coach for Massachusetts Maritime Academy from 2001 to 2004. He was previously an assistant coach for New Bedford High School and Falmouth High School. He played college football at Bridgewater State.

== Head coaching record ==
Year	Team	Overall	Conference	Standing	Bowl/playoffs
Massachusetts Maritime Buccaneers (New England Football Conference) (2001–2004)
2001	Massachusetts Maritime	2–7	2–4	T–3rd (Bogan)	
2002	Massachusetts Maritime	1–8	1–5	T–5th (Bogan)	
2003	Massachusetts Maritime	2–7	2–4	5th (Bogan)	
2004	Massachusetts Maritime	1–8	1–5	6th (Bogan)	
Massachusetts Maritime:		6–30	6–18		
Total:		6–30			
