= Bridgewater State Bears football =

College football team

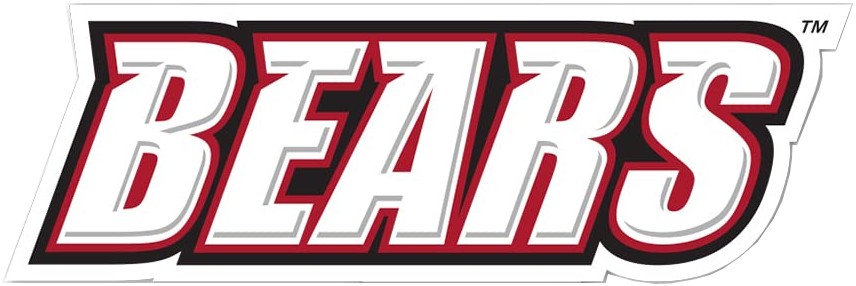
- First season: 1894; 132 years ago (Note: The program was discontinued in 1925. It was relaunched in 1960; 66 years ago.)
- Athletic director: Marybeth Lamb
- Head coach: Joe Verria; 9th season, 54–39 (.581)
- Location: Bridgewater, Massachusetts
- Stadium: Mazzaferro Field (capacity: 1,600)
- NCAA division: Division III
- Conference: MASCAC
- Colors: Crimson, white, and black
- All-time record: 335–238–7 (.584)
- Bowl record: 4–5 (.444)

Conference championships
- 7
- Rivalries: Massachusetts Maritime (Cranberry Bowl)
- Mascot: BRISTACO the Bear
- Website: bsubears.com/football

The Bridgewater State Bears football team represents Bridgewater State University in college football at the NCAA Division III level. The Bears are members of the Massachusetts State Collegiate Athletic Conference (MASCAC), fielding its team in the MASCAC since 2013. The Bears play their home games at Mazzaferro Field in Bridgewater, Massachusetts.

The Bridgewater State football team has been one of the most successful athletic teams at the school since the program was started in 1960. Bridgewater State is a member of the MASCAC, which will sponsor football for the first time in its history beginning in 2013. Bridgewater State was formerly a founding member of the New England Football Conference from 1965 to 2012. The new MASCAC football conference will consist of nine schools. These member schools are Bridgewater State University, Fitchburg State University, Framingham State University, Massachusetts Maritime Academy, Westfield State University, Worcester State University, Plymouth State University, UMass-Dartmouth, and Western Connecticut State University. Bridgewater State will begin MASCAC play in 2013.

Their head coach is Joe Verria, who took over the position for the 2016 season.

== History ==
Known as Bridgewater Normal, the team played throughout the 1890s and 1920s before being disbanded in 1925. In 1959, athletic director and basketball coach Ed Sweeney announced that football would return as a varsity sport after students voluntarily taxed themselves seven dollars per year to fund the restart of the team.

The team began play in 1960 with a four-game schedule.

Head coach Chuck Denune recently completed his 11th season at the helm in 2015. In 2012, the Bears ended the regular season with a 9–1 record and qualified for the NCAA Division III National Tournament with an at-large bid for the third time in the program's history. Bridgewater State also qualified for the NCAA Division III National Tournament in 1999 and 2000. The Bears lost in the first round of the 2012 NCAA Division III Tournament to Widener University of West Chester, Pennsylvania by a score of 44–14. The Bears football team finished the 2012 season with a 9–2 overall record and finished in 2nd place in the New England Football Conference standings. Bridgewater also hosted the 2011 (ECAC) Eastern College Athletic Conference Northeast Bowl and competed against Alfred University. Unfortunately, the Bears lost 41–10, and finished the 2011 season with a 7–4 record.

The most successful head football coach in Bridgewater State's history is Peter Mazzaferro. Coach Mazzaferro was the head football coach at Bridgewater from 1968 to 2004 (36 years) and is one of the most successful Division III football coaches in history. During his coaching tenure, he led the Bears to 2 NCAA D-III National Tournament appearances, 8 NEFC League Championships, 3 MASCAC Championships, and 2 ECAC Postseason appearances. With an overall coaching record of 209–157–11, Mazzaferro is the 57th winningest coach in NCAA College Football history, and he is regarded as a coaching legend in the New England region and is further regarded as one of the greatest Division III college football coaches of all time.

== Conference affiliations ==
- NAIA independent (1960–1964)
- New England Football Conference (1965–2012)
- Massachusetts State Collegiate Athletic Conference (2013–present)

== Championships ==
=== Conference championships ===
Bridgewater State claims 7 conference titles, the most recent of which came in 2023.

Year	Conference	Overall Record	Conference Record	Coach
1989	New England Football Conference	9–1	6–0	Peter Mazzaferro
1992	New England Football Conference	9–1–1	8–0	Peter Mazzaferro
1997†	New England Football Conference	7–3	7–1	Peter Mazzaferro
1999	New England Football Conference	10–1	6–0	Peter Mazzaferro
2000	New England Football Conference	8–3	5–1	Peter Mazzaferro
2016	Massachusetts State Collegiate Athletic Conference	8–3	8–0	Joe Verria
2023†	Massachusetts State Collegiate Athletic Conference	7–3	7–1	Joe Verria

† Co-champions

=== Division championships ===
Bridgewater State claims 7 division titles, the most recent of which came in 2008.

Year	Division	Coach	Overall Record	Conference Record	Opponent	CG result
1989	NEFC South	Peter Mazzaferro	9–1	6–0	Maine Maritime	W 14–10
1990	NEFC South	Peter Mazzaferro	8–2	6–0	Plymouth State	L 7–26
1991	NEFC South	Peter Mazzaferro	8–2	6–0	UMass Lowell	L 7–10
1998†	NEFC Red	Peter Mazzaferro	7–3	5–1	N/A lost tiebreaker to Maine Maritime	
1999	NEFC Red	Peter Mazzaferro	10–1	6–0	No championship game held	
2000†	NEFC Bogan	Peter Mazzaferro	8–3	5–1	Salve Regina	W 27–24
2008†	NEFC Bogan	Chuck Denune	7–3	6–1	N/A lost tiebreaker to Maine Maritime	

† Co-champions

== Postseason games ==
=== NCAA Division III playoff games ===
Bridgewater State have made five appearances in the Division III playoffs, with an overall record of 0–4.

Year	Round	Opponent	Result
1999	First Round	Ursinus	L, 38–43
2000	First Round	Hobart	L, 0–25
2012	First Round	Widener	L, 14–44
2016	First Round	Alfred	L, 27–33
2026	First Round	Amherst	TBP

=== Bowl games ===
Bridgewater State has participated in nine bowl games, and has a record of 4–5.

Season	Coach	Bowl	Opponent	Result
1989	Peter Mazzaferro	ECAC Bowl	Alfred	L 27–30
1992	Peter Mazzaferro	ECAC Bowl	RPI	L 25–28
2005	Chuck Denune	ECAC Bowl	Fitchburg State	W 34–17
2006	Chuck Denune	ECAC Bowl	Coast Guard	W 41–22
2007	Chuck Denune	ECAC Bowl	Plymouth State	L 21–24
2011	Chuck Denune	ECAC Bowl	Alfred	L 10–41
2015	Chuck Denune	ECAC Bowl	Carnegie Mellon	L 13–48
2018	Joe Verria	New England Bowl	Salve Regina	W 34–19
2022	Joe Verria	New England Bowl	Catholic	W 34–24

== List of head coaches ==
=== Key ===
Key to symbols in coaches list
General		Overall		Conference		Postseason (Note: Although the first Rose Bowl Game was played in 1902, it has been continuously played since the 1916 game, and is recognized as the oldest bowl game by the NCAA. "—" indicates any season prior to 1916 when postseason games were not played.)	
No.	Order of coaches (Note: A running total of the number of head coaches, with coaches who served separate tenures being counted only once. Interim head coaches are represented with "Int" and are not counted in the running total. "—" indicates the team played but either without a coach or no coach is on record. "X" indicates an interim year without play.)	GC	Games coached	CW	Conference wins	PW	Postseason wins
DC	Division championships	OW	Overall wins	CL	Conference losses	PL	Postseason losses
CC	Conference championships	OL	Overall losses	CT	Conference ties	PT	Postseason ties
NC	National championships	OT	Overall ties (Note: Overtime rules in college football were introduced in 1996, making ties impossible in the period since.)	C%	Conference winning percentage		
†	Elected to the College Football Hall of Fame	O%	Overall winning percentage (Note: When computing the win–loss percentage, a tie counts as half a win and half a loss.)				

=== Coaches ===
List of head football coaches showing season(s) coached, overall records, conference records, postseason records, championships and selected awards
No.	Name	Season(s)	GC	OW	OL	OT	O%	CW	CL	CT	C%	PW	PL	PT	DC	CC	NC	Awards
1	Ed Swenson	1960–1967	47	14	33	0	0.298	–	–	–	–	–	–	–	–	–	–	–
2	Peter Mazzaferro	1968–1986, 1988–2004	339	195	137	7	0.586	148	82	0	0.643	0	4	0	6	5	0	–
3	Jim Crowley	1987	9	4	5	0	0.444	3	2	0	0.600	0	0	0	0	0	0	–
4	Chuck Denune	2005–2015	112	75	37	0	0.670	55	24	0	0.696	2	4	0	1	0	0	–
5	Joe Verria	2016–present	63	37	26	0	0.587	48	24	0	0.667	2	2	0	–	1	0	–

== Year-by-year results ==
National champions	Conference champions	Division champions	Bowl game berth	Playoff berth

Season	Year	Head Coach	Association	Division	Conference	Record							Postseason	Final ranking
Season	Year	Head Coach	Association	Division	Conference	Overall			Conference				Postseason	Final ranking
Season	Year	Head Coach	Association	Division	Conference	Win	Loss	Tie	Finish	Win	Loss	Tie	Postseason	Final ranking
Bridgewater State Bears
1960	1960	Ed Swenson	NAIA	—	NAIA Independent	1	3	0	—	—	—	—	—	—
1961	1961	Ed Swenson	NAIA	—	NAIA Independent	3	2	0	—	—	—	—	—	—
1962	1962	Ed Swenson	NAIA	—	NAIA Independent	1	3	0	—	—	—	—	—	—
1963	1963	Ed Swenson	NAIA	—	NAIA Independent	2	5	0	—	—	—	—	—	—
1964	1964	Ed Swenson	NAIA	—	NAIA Independent	0	7	0	—	—	—	—	—	—
1965	1965	Ed Swenson	NCAA	College Division	NEFC	0	6	0	—	—	—	—	—	—
1966	1966	Ed Swenson	NCAA	College Division	NEFC	3	4	0	—	—	—	—	—	—
1967	1967	Ed Swenson	NCAA	College Division	NEFC	4	3	0	—	—	—	—	—	—
1968	1968	Peter Mazzaferro	NCAA	College Division	NEFC	5	3	0	—	—	—	—	—	—
1969	1969	Peter Mazzaferro	NCAA	College Division	NEFC	3	4	1	—	—	—	—	—	—
1970	1970	Peter Mazzaferro	NCAA	College Division	NEFC	0	8	0	—	—	—	—	—	—
1971	1971	Peter Mazzaferro	NCAA	College Division	NEFC	3	6	0	—	—	—	—	—	—
1972	1972	Peter Mazzaferro	NCAA	College Division	NEFC	4	5	0	5th	2	2	0	—	—
1973	1973	Peter Mazzaferro	NCAA	Division III	NEFC	5	5	0	T–3rd	2	2	0	—	—
1974	1974	Peter Mazzaferro	NCAA	Division III	NEFC	6	4	0	T–5th	4	3	0	—	—
1975	1975	Peter Mazzaferro	NCAA	Division III	NEFC	7	3	0	T–4th	5	3	0	—	—
1976	1976	Peter Mazzaferro	NCAA	Division III	NEFC	6	3	0	T–2nd	5	3	0	—	—
1977	1977	Peter Mazzaferro	NCAA	Division III	NEFC	6	3	0	T–2nd	5	3	0		—
1978	1978	Peter Mazzaferro	NCAA	Division III	NEFC	3	6	0	7th	3	5	0	—	—
1979	1979	Peter Mazzaferro	NCAA	Division III	NEFC	3	5	1	8th	3	5	1	—	—
1980	1980	Peter Mazzaferro	NCAA	Division III	NEFC	5	3	1	T–4th	5	3	1	—	—
1981	1981	Peter Mazzaferro	NCAA	Division III	NEFC	3	6	0	T–7th	3	6	0	—	—
1982	1982	Peter Mazzaferro	NCAA	Division III	NEFC	5	3	1	4th	5	3	1	—	—
1983	1983	Peter Mazzaferro	NCAA	Division III	NEFC	4	5	0	T–5th	4	5	0	—	—
1984	1984	Peter Mazzaferro	NCAA	Division III	NEFC	2	7	0	T–7th	2	7	0	—	—
1985	1985	Peter Mazzaferro	NCAA	Division III	NEFC	5	4	0	3rd	5	4	0	—	—
1986	1986	Peter Mazzaferro	NCAA	Division III	NEFC	6	1	2	4th	6	1	2	—	—
1987	1987	Jim Crowley	NCAA	Division III	NEFC	4	5	0	T–2nd (South)	3	2	0	—	—
1988	1988	Peter Mazzaferro	NCAA	Division III	NEFC	5	4	0	T–4th (South)	3	3	0	—	—
1989	1989	Peter Mazzaferro	NCAA	Division III	NEFC	9	1	0	1st (South)	6	0	0	L ECAC North Bowl	—
1990	1990	Peter Mazzaferro	NCAA	Division III	NEFC	8	2	0	1st (South)	6	0	0	Division champions	—
1991	1991	Peter Mazzaferro	NCAA	Division III	NEFC	8	2	0	1st (South)	6	0	0	Division champions	—
1992	1992	Peter Mazzaferro	NCAA	Division III	NEFC	9	1	1	1st	8	0	0	L ECAC Northeast Bowl	—
1993	1993	Peter Mazzaferro	NCAA	Division III	NEFC	5	5	0	T–3rd	5	3	0	—	—
1994	1994	Peter Mazzaferro	NCAA	Division III	NEFC	6	4	0	T–3rd	6	2	0	—	—
1995	1995	Peter Mazzaferro	NCAA	Division III	NEFC	6	4	0	T–2nd	6	2	0	—	—
1996	1996	Peter Mazzaferro	NCAA	Division III	NEFC	5	5	0	T–5th	4	4	0	—	—
1997	1997	Peter Mazzaferro	NCAA	Division III	NEFC	7	3	0	T–1st	7	1	0	Conference champions	—
1998	1998	Peter Mazzaferro	NCAA	Division III	NEFC	7	3	0	1st (Red)	7	1	0	Conference champions	—
1999	1999	Peter Mazzaferro	NCAA	Division III	NEFC	10	1	0	1st (Red)	6	0	0	L NCAA Division III First Round	—
2000	2000	Peter Mazzaferro	NCAA	Division III	NEFC	8	3	0	T–1st (Bogan)	5	1	0	L NCAA Division III First Round	—
2001	2001	Peter Mazzaferro	NCAA	Division III	NEFC	5	4	0	3rd (Bogan)	3	3	0	—	—
2002	2002	Peter Mazzaferro	NCAA	Division III	NEFC	4	5	0	4th (Bogan)	3	3	0	—	—
2003	2003	Peter Mazzaferro	NCAA	Division III	NEFC	6	3	0	3rd (Bogan)	4	2	0	—	—
2004	2004	Peter Mazzaferro	NCAA	Division III	NEFC	6	3	0	T–2nd (Bogan)	4	2	0	—	—
2005	2005	Chuck Denune	NCAA	Division III	NEFC	9	1	0	2nd (Bogan)	5	1	0	W ECAC Northeast Bowl	—
2006	2006	Chuck Denune	NCAA	Division III	NEFC	8	2	0	2nd (Bogan)	6	1	0	W ECAC North Atlantic Bowl	—
2007	2007	Chuck Denune	NCAA	Division III	NEFC	6	4	0	2nd (Bogan)	5	2	0	L ECAC North Atlantic Bowl	—
2008	2008	Chuck Denune	NCAA	Division III	NEFC	7	3	0	T–1st (Bogan)	6	1	0	Division champions	—
2009	2009	Chuck Denune	NCAA	Division III	NEFC	7	3	0	T–2nd (Bogan)	5	2	0	—	—
2010	2010	Chuck Denune	NCAA	Division III	NEFC	5	5	0	T–5th (Bogan)	3	4	0	—	—
2011	2011	Chuck Denune	NCAA	Division III	NEFC	7	3	0	T–2nd (Bogan)	5	2	0	L ECAC Northeast Bowl	—
2012	2012	Chuck Denune	NCAA	Division III	NEFC	9	2	0	2nd (Bogan)	6	1	0	L NCAA Division III First Round	—
2013	2013	Chuck Denune	NCAA	Division III	MASCAC	6	4	0	T–3rd	5	3	0	—	—
2014	2014	Chuck Denune	NCAA	Division III	MASCAC	4	6	0	T–6th	3	5	0	—	—
2015	2015	Chuck Denune	NCAA	Division III	MASCAC	7	4	0	T–2nd	6	2	0	L ECAC Legacy Bowl	—
2016	2016	Joe Verria	NCAA	Division III	MASCAC	8	3	0	1st	8	0	0	L NCAA Division III First Round	—
2017	2017	Joe Verria	NCAA	Division III	MASCAC	2	8	0	T–7th	2	6	0	—	—
2018	2018	Joe Verria	NCAA	Division III	MASCAC	8	3	0	T–2nd	6	2	0	W New England Bowl	—
2019	2019	Joe Verria	NCAA	Division III	MASCAC	6	4	0	T–2nd	6	2	0	—	—
Season canceled due to COVID-19
2021	2021	Joe Verria	NCAA	Division III	MASCAC	6	4	0	T–2nd	6	2	0	—	—
2022	2022	Joe Verria	NCAA	Division III	MASCAC	7	4	0	T–2nd	6	2	0	W New England Bowl	—
2023	2023	Joe Verria	NCAA	Division III	MASCAC	7	3	0	T-1st	7	1	0	—	—
2024	2024	Joe Verria	NCAA	Division III	MASCAC	5	5	0	T–3rd	5	4	0	—	
2025	2025	Joe Verria	NCAA	Division III	MASCAC	5	5	0	T-5th	5	4	0	—	—

== Notable former players ==
- Christopher Dijak – Professional wrestler
- Joe Domingos – Former head coach for Massachusetts Maritime
- Paul Melicharek – Former defensive lineman
- Andrae Murphy – Current head coach for Dean, former defensive back and linebacker
- Joe Verria – Current head coach for Bridgewater State, former defensive tackle
- James Cahoon – Current quarterback for the Jacksonville Sharks, former quarterback

== See also ==
- Bridgewater State Bears
