= 2022 Plymouth State Panthers football team =

American college football season

2022 Plymouth State Panthers football

New England Bowl, W 21–20 vs. Husson
- Conference: Massachusetts State Collegiate Athletic Conference
- Record: 9–2 (6–2 MASCAC)
- Head coach: Paul Castonia (19th season); Devin Zeman (2nd season)
- Offensive coordinator: Matt Elsker (1st season)
- Defensive coordinator: Devin Zeman (14th season)
- Home stadium: Panther Field

2022 Massachusetts State Collegiate Athletic Conference football standings
	Conf.			Overall
Team	W		L	W		L
UMass Dartmouth $^	8	–	0	9	–	2
Plymouth State	6	–	2	9	–	2
Western Connecticut	6	–	2	7	–	3
Bridgewater State	6	–	2	7	–	4
Framingham State	4	–	4	5	–	5
Massachusetts Maritime	3	–	5	3	–	7
Westfield State	2	–	6	2	–	8
Worcester State	1	–	7	1	–	9
Fitchburg State	0	–	8	1	–	9
$ – Conference champion; ^ – NCAA Division III playoff participant

The 2022 Plymouth State Panthers football team represented Plymouth State University as a member of the Massachusetts State Collegiate Athletic Conference (MASCAC) during the 2022 NCAA Division III football season. The Panthers, led by 19th-year head coach Paul Castonia, played their home games at Panther Field in Plymouth, New Hampshire.

== Schedule ==
Date	Time	Opponent	Site	TV	Result	Attendance
September 3	12:00 p.m.	Castleton*	Panther Field; Plymouth, NH	LEC Network	W 20–7	760
September 10	12:00 p.m.	at Husson*	Winkin Sports Complex; Bangor, ME		W 17–0	1,700
September 17	12:00 p.m.	Bridgewater State	Panther Field; Plymouth, NH	LEC Network	W 41–34	1,100
October 1	12:00 p.m.	at Framingham State	Bowditch Field; Framingham, MA		W 14–9	900
October 8	1:00 p.m.	Western Connecticut State	Panther Field; Plymouth, NH	LEC Network	L 27–34	2,399
October 15	12:00 p.m.	at Fitchburg State	Elliot Field; Fitchburg, MA		W 42–7	120
October 22	12:00 p.m.	at Worcester State	John Coughlin Memorial Field; Worcester, MA		W 56–21	670
October 29	12:00 p.m.	Westfield State	Panther Field; Plymouth, NH	LEC Network	W 31–22	1,029
November 5	12:00 p.m.	at Massachusetts Maritime	Clean Harbors Stadium; Buzzards Bay, MA		W 21–7	1,891
November 12	12:00 p.m.	UMass Dartmouth	Panther Field; Plymouth, NH	LEC Network	L 21–46	1,112
November 19	12:00 p.m.	at Husson*	Winkin Sports Complex; Bangor, ME (New England Bowl)		W 21–20	1,100
*Non-conference game; All times are in Eastern time

== Game summaries ==
=== Castleton ===
Game One – Plymouth State Panthers (0–0) vs Castleton Spartans (0–0)

Quarter	1	2	3	4	Total
Castleton	0	0	7	0	7
Plymouth State	10	3	0	7	20

at Panther Field • Plymouth, New Hampshire

- Date: Saturday, September 3, 2022
- Game time: 12:00 p.m. EST
- Game weather: Temperature: 69 °F (21 °C) • Weather: Sunny
- Game attendance: 760
- Referee: Chris Hadden

Game information

First quarter
Second quarter
Third quarter
Fourth quarter

Statistics	CAS	PSU
First downs		
Plays–yards		
Rushes–yards		
Passing yards		
Passing: comp–att–int		
Time of possession		

Team	Category	Player	Statistics
Castleton	Passing		
Castleton	Rushing		
Castleton	Receiving		
Plymouth State	Passing		
Plymouth State	Rushing		
Plymouth State	Receiving		

== Personnel ==
=== Coaching staff ===
Name	Position
Paul Castonia	Head coach
Devin Zeman	Defensive coordinator/defensive backs
Matt Elsker	Offensive coordinator/running backs
Matt Banuskevich	Receivers
David Carlson	Linebackers
Matt Girard	Quarterbacks
Trevor Hnyda	Defensive line
Christopher Snook	Defensive backs
John Thomas	Director of strength and conditioning
Micah Dion	Athletic trainer
Rachel Springmann	Athletic trainer
David Salazar	Manager

=== Roster ===
2022 Plymouth State Panthers Football
Quarterbacks Running backs Wide receivers	Tight end Offensive linemen	Defensive linemen Linebackers	Defensive backs Placekicker
Source and player details, 2022 Plymouth State Panthers (11/19/2022):
