= Ed Swenson =

American sports coach and athletic administrator (1917–2001)

Biographical details
- Born: 1917
- Died: December 31, 2001 (aged 84); Lady Lake, Florida, U.S.

Coaching career (HC unless noted)

Football
- 1960–1967: Bridgewater State

Basketball
- 1949–1963: Bridgewater State

Administrative career (AD unless noted)
- 1949–1977: Bridgewater State

Head coaching record
- Overall: 14–33 (football)

Edward C. Swenson (1917 – December 31, 2001) was an American football, basketball, and soccer coach and college athletics administrator. He served as the head football coach at Bridgewater State College in Bridgewater, Massachusetts from 1960 to 1967. As the athletic director at Bridgewater State, Swenson was instrumental in getting football reinstated as a varsity sport in 1960 after the program had been shut down for 30 years. Swenson was also a founding member of the New England Football Conference.

Swenson died on December 31, 2001, in Lady Lake, Florida.

== Head coaching record ==
=== Football ===
Year	Team	Overall	Conference	Standing	Bowl/playoffs
Bridgewater State Bears (NAIA independent) (1960–1964)
1960	Bridgewater State	1–3			
1961	Bridgewater State	3–2			
1962	Bridgewater State	1–3			
1963	Bridgewater State	2–5			
1964	Bridgewater State	0–7			
Bridgewater State Bears (New England Football Conference) (1965–1967)
1965	Bridgewater State	0–6			
1966	Bridgewater State	3–4			
1967	Bridgewater State	4–3			
Bridgewater State:		14–33			
Total:		14–33			
