= Gerard T. Indelicato =

American academic administrator and advisor, convicted of fraud

Dr. Gerard T. Indelicato

9th President of the Bridgewater State College
- In office 1986–1987
- Preceded by: Adrian Rondileau
- Succeeded by: Adrian Rondileau

Governor's Adviser on Educational Affairs
- In office 1983–1986
- Governor: Michael Dukakis
- Preceded by: Position created
- Succeeded by: Robert Schwartz

Personal details
- Born: May 21, 1946 (age 80) Boston
- Education: Bridgewater State College; University of Connecticut

Gerard Thomas Indelicato (May 21, 1946) is an American academic administrator who served as education advisor to Massachusetts Governor Michael Dukakis and president of Bridgewater State College. He was convicted on federal and state conspiracy, fraud, and tax evasion charges.

== Early life ==
Indelicato was born in Boston on May 21, 1946. He grew up in Hyde Park and graduated Hyde Park High School. After high school, Indelicato spent two years in the Massachusetts National Guard. He then went on to attend Bridgewater State College, where he was a member of the football team under the guidance of head coach Peter Mazzaferro. He graduated in 1971, but returned to the school to earn his master's in education.

== Education career ==
After college, Indelicato worked as an elementary school teacher, assistant principal, and community education director in Brockton, Massachusetts. He then attended the University of Connecticut, where he earned his doctorate in education management.

In 1977, Indelicato began working at the Massachusetts Department of Education as director of the bureau of community education and adult services. In 1981 he became the dean of undergraduate studies at Worcester State College. During the 1982 gubernatorial election, Indelicato served as Michael Dukakis' campaign adviser and liaison with education groups. In February 1983, Dukakis appointed Indelicato to the cabinet-level position of education adviser (The Secretary of Education's position was abolished in 1980). During his tenure in the Dukakis administration, Indelicato helped gain passage of a school reform bill and led the governor's fight against the chancellor of the state's Board of Regents of Higher Education, James Collins. In 1986, he shoved state representative Christopher Hodgkins during a dispute over a political appointment.

In July 1986, Indelicato was appointed president of Bridgewater State College. He was formally sworn into office by Dukakis on May 3, 1987. After taking office, Indelicato raised the school's admission standards and raised funds to improve the library and campus grounds. He also demoted the school's athletic director for minor NCAA rules infractions and publicly berated and demoted Coach Mazzaferro, whom he had played for when he was a student. Mazzaferro was reinstated in 1988 following Indelicato's resignation.

Indelicato was forced to resign December 7, 1987 after the school's board of trustees discovered that he had forged their signatures on a deed transferring land from the school's foundation to him.

=== Criminal convictions ===
On December 18, 1987, Indelicato was indicted on mail and wire fraud, filing false tax returns, and lying to a federal grand jury. According to the indictment, Indelicato had received inflated rent money and renovation bills from an adult education center that received government funds when he ran the state adult education program. He also diverted $40,000 earmarked to the center to Administrative Associates, a consulting group he created with his doctoral adviser. Indelicato then failed to report this money on his federal income tax returns. On April 21, 1988 he pleaded guilty to conspiracy, mail fraud, perjury, and two counts of making false statements on his tax returns. He began serving a 30 month prison sentence on August 5, 1988.

On June 23, 1988, Indelicato was indicted by a Suffolk County grand jury on charges of fraud, conflict of interest, filing false tax returns, and forgery for directing no-bid state contracts to Administrative Associates during his tenure as Dukakis' education advisor. That same day he was indicted a separate grand jury in Plymouth County for larceny, forgery and conflict of interest that allegedly took place while he was president of Bridgewater State College. The indictment accused Indelicato of forging the deed and related documents to transfer land from Bridgewater State College Foundation to himself so he could build a personal residence. It also alleged that he used $7,500 of the college's money on a consulting contract for Administrative Associates. As part of a plea agreement, Indelicato pleaded guilty to 8 of the indictment's 46 counts. On February 21, 1989 he was sentenced to 3 years in jail and five years probation. His sentence was reduced on October 23, 1990 after the judge corrected an error in his original sentence in a revise-and-revoke hearing.

Indelicato served his federal sentence at United States Penitentiary, Allenwood. He finished his sentence on November 3, 1989, and began his state sentence at Massachusetts Correctional Institution – Plymouth. He was released on November 2, 1990.

== Later life ==
After his release from prison, Indelicato worked as a used car salesman. He served general manager of Herb Connolly Chevrolet in Framingham, Massachusetts.
