= Chuck Denune =

American football coach (born 1976)

Biographical details
- Born: c. 1976 (age 49–50)
- Education: Heidelberg University (OH) (1998)

Playing career
- 1993–1996: Heidelberg

Coaching career (HC unless noted)
- 1997: Heidelberg (GA)
- 1998–2000: Bridgewater State (GA)
- 2001–2004: Bridgewater State (RB/WR/DB/OL)
- 2005–2015: Bridgewater State

Head coaching record
- Overall: 75–37
- Bowls: 2–5
- Tournaments: 0–1 (NCAA D-III playoffs)

Charles Denune (born c. 1976) is an American former college football coach. He most recently was the head coach for the Bridgewater State Bears football team from 2005 to 2015. He played college football for Heidelberg.

Denune resigned from his head coaching position at Bridgewater State amidst his arrest for domestic assault in 2016.

== Head coaching record ==
| Year | Team | Overall | Conference | Standing | Bowl/playoffs |
|---|---|---|---|---|---|
Bridgewater State Bears (New England Football Conference) (2005–2012)
| 2005 | Bridgewater State | 9–1 | 5–1 | 2nd (Bogan) | W ECAC Northeast Bowl |
| 2006 | Bridgewater State | 8–2 | 6–1 | 2nd (Bogan) | W ECAC North Atlantic Bowl |
| 2007 | Bridgewater State | 6–4 | 5–2 | 2nd (Bogan) | L ECAC North Atlantic Bowl |
| 2008 | Bridgewater State | 7–3 | 6–1 | T–1st (Bogan) | |
| 2009 | Bridgewater State | 7–3 | 5–2 | T–2nd (Bogan) | |
| 2010 | Bridgewater State | 5–5 | 3–4 | T–5th (Bogan) | |
| 2011 | Bridgewater State | 7–3 | 5–2 | T–2nd (Bogan) | L ECAC Northeast Bowl |
| 2012 | Bridgewater State | 9–2 | 6–1 | 2nd (Bogan) | L NCAA Division III First Round |
Bridgewater State Bears (Massachusetts State Collegiate Athletic Conference) (2013–2015)
| 2013 | Bridgewater State | 6–4 | 5–3 | T–3rd | |
| 2014 | Bridgewater State | 4–6 | 3–5 | T–6th | |
| 2015 | Bridgewater State | 7–4 | 6–2 | T–2nd | L ECAC Legacy Bowl |
| Bridgewater State: | | 75–37 | 55–24 | | |
| Total: | | 75–37 | | | |
National championship Conference title Conference division title or championship game berth
