= Ithaca College Television =

Ithaca College Television (ICTV)
- Ithaca, New York; United States
- Channels: Digital: 16 (Spectrum)

Programming
- Affiliations: None

Ownership
- Owner: Ithaca College

History
- Founded: March 3, 1958
- Former names: WICB-TV (1958-86); ICB-TV (1986-92)

Links
- Website: ictv.org

Ithaca College Television (ICTV) is Ithaca College's student-run television station. It's the largest student-run organization on Ithaca's campus. Founded in 1958 as the country's first student-run cable television station, ICTV provides original, student-produced programming to approximately 26,000 households in Tompkins County, New York through Spectrum Cable. Additionally, ICTV offers a livestream of its programming on its website, ICTV.org, along with on-demand episodes from past and present shows.

ICTV airs on Spectrum 16, the City of Ithaca's educational cable access channel. The channel programs ten-week seasons during Ithaca's fall and spring semesters and airs Sundays through Thursdays from 6:00 - 9:00pm. When ICTV is not broadcasting original content, a live view of Cayuga Lake is transmitted with live audio from VIC Radio, Ithaca College's student-run online radio station.

Ithaca College Television was created to provide community-oriented public affairs and entertainment programming to the Ithaca-area cable audience. The station has four departments of programming - News, Sports, Entertainment and Scripted. As all programming on ICTV is student-initiated and produced, each semester's shows are based on the interests of the active student participants. Though it varies from semester to semester, ICTV features between 20 and 25 shows, and over 400 student volunteers. Re-introduced to ICTV in Spring 2014, Special Projects focuses on bringing live and non-traditional programming to ICTV. Projects include event coverage, student films, and extended sports, news packages, and more.

== Current Programming ==
ICTV currently has the following television programs in production:

- After Hours

A late night talk show including pop culture and current event jokes and discussion, guest interviews and performer showcases.

- Big Red Faceoff

Sports show covering Cornell University's men's and women's ice hockey teams, including highlights, analysis and interviews.

- Bombers Live

Live play-by-play coverage of Ithaca College home football and basketball games with studio shows and analysis.

- Fake Out

Competitive game show challenging contestants to guess which stories are true and which are false.

- Game Over

News show focused on video game, movie and comic reviews, covering all things internet and geek culture.

- Good Day Ithaca

ICTV's local morning newscast covering Ithaca and Tompkins County, NY.

- Hold That Thought

Live sports debate show covering local college and professional sports.

- ICTV Reports

ICTV's monthly local news magazine with in-depth, investigative reporting in Ithaca and Tompkins County, NY.

- Looped In!

Entertainment news show.

- Newswatch

ICTV's local evening newscast covering Ithaca and Tompkins County, NY. Newswatch is the only local evening news program in the area.

- Business Central

ICTV's only news show dedicated to the US stock market, emerging industries, and other business news.

- Evening In America

ICTV's news show dedicated to the latest political news from across the country.

- Looped In

ICTV's news show dedicated to what's new in the entertainment world. From Ithaca NY to Hollywood.

- Next Player Up

Sports discussion and analysis with two featured anchors, plus interviews with Ithaca College athletes.

- Roommate Rumble

Gameshow with two sets of roommates competing head-to-head in a variety of competitions.

- So You Think You Know Sports

Sports trivia game show.

- Sports Final

Local weekly sportscast covering Ithaca College, Cornell University and local high school sports and teams.

- The Director's Chair

Show focused on Park School student media and student produced films. Each episode includes an in-studio interview with a student producer, film maker or content creator and clips from their recent work.

- The Gridiron Report

Weekly recap of Ithaca College football with analysis, debate and in-studio interviews with Bombers players and coaches.

- First Years

A cinematic, mystery-comedy serial about friendship, crime, and the first-year experience.

== Past Programming ==
ICTV's archives hold sixty plus years of original ICTV programs and special content, some of which can be found on ICTV's website. Past programs have included sketch comedy, animation, game shows, music shows, roundtable discussion, kids shows and coverage of local news and sports. Listed below are some notable programs from ICTV's past:

=== "ICTV's Holiday Special" ===
A live hour-long special with local bands, ICTV Hosts, and some professors. There are educational aspects, games, trivia, live music segments, and baking competitions.

=== "Ivy" ===
Based on the hit MTV shows Laguna Beach and The Hills, IVY was the most recent show to gain significant attention at ICTV. The new comedy was the first ICTV show to take place entirely at Cornell University. Praised for its unique visual design and effective parody of reality TV-style shows, IVY became a major hit not only at Ithaca College and Cornell University, but throughout the entire Ivy League as well. After the first season premiered, Ivy was recognized on several blogs, and The Cornell Daily Sun wrote an article about the show.

=== "The Race" ===
One show that generated excitement outside of the Ithaca community was The Race, a reality series inspired by the hit CBS show, The Amazing Race. The Race won several awards and was recognized on various reality TV websites and blogs. It aired for two seasons in 2007.

== Awards ==
ICTV is an active member of College Broadcasters, Inc (CBI) and consistently places in the finals for the annual National Student Production Awards competition hosted by CBI. The station has also won awards from the New York State Broadcasters Association (NYSBA), Broadcast Education Association (BEA), Society of Professional Journalists (SPJ) and Syracuse Press Club, recognizing outstanding news and sports coverage, plus entertainment and scripted programming, editing and production.

In 2021, ICTV took first place as Four-Year Television Station of the Year in the College Media Association's annual Pinnacle Awards competition. Notable recent awards won by the station are listed below:

Broadcast Education Association (BEA)

2026 Festival of Media Arts: Student Video Awards

- Studio (Multi-Camera or Live-to-Tape) - Award of Excellence - "Ithaca College Television Holiday Special " - Lauren Fonseca, Cooper Visco, Alex Siegelson & Nick Polisi

2012 Festival of Media Arts: Student Video Awards

- Studio (Multi-Camera or Live-to-Tape) - Third Place - "Pop Quiz, Tournament of Champions"

College Broadcasters, Inc. (CBI)

2025 National Student Production Awards

- Video Channel of The Year - First Place - "ICTV" - Connor Smith, Nick Polisi, Ethan Hallas, Jack DeNick, Ally Mahoney, Allison Lemon, Jenna Johnson, Scianna Scott, Olivia Celenza, Sabrina Layman, Harrison Chinchar, Lindsay Paille, Katherine Kummerer, Ani Nicolaus, Cameron Strong, Madison Schriver, Undarmaa Tserenkhuu
- Best Sportscast (Video) - Fourth Place - "Sports Final" - Melanie Heim, Kyle Caiafa, Ted Dougherty
- Best Video Music Production (Video) - First Place - "After Hours" - Payton Adams, Anthony DeSando, Noah Robinson, Rhiannon Strazisar
- Best Live Sports Broadcast (Video) - Third Place - "Bombers Live Basketball" - Hannah Broxmeyer, James Lubrano, Justin Antonucci, Devon Jarvis

2022 National Student Production Awards

- Best Promo (Video) - Third Place - "Sports Final Promo" - Jess Schmalholz, Allie Barbaro, Cameron Gasmer, Max Tanzer and Rheanna DeCrow
- Best Hard News Reporting (Video) - Fourth Place - "Magic Man Attacked on the Commons" - Grant Johnson
- Best Feature News Reporting (Video) - Fourth Place - "Excavation Uncovers More About Ithaca's Underground Railroad History" - Emily Hung

New York State Broadcasters Association (NYSBA)

2023 Excellence in Broadcasting Awards

- Outstanding Public Affairs Program (College Television Division) - Winner - "ICTV Reports" - Griffin Homan, Inbaayini Anbarasan and Brooke Vogel
- Outstanding Sportscast (College Television Division) - Winner - "Sports Final" - Bryan Manchester, Julia Foster and Ryan Spadafina
- Outstanding Evening Newscast (College Television Division) - Winner - "Newswatch" - Grant Johnson, Paige Morrissey and David Teska
- Outstanding Morning Newscast (College Television Division) - "Good Day Ithaca" - Devon Jezek, Roxanne Palladino and Katy Fleming

Syracuse Press Club

2022-2023 Professional Recognition Awards

- Best Television/Video News Story (Student Competition) - First Place - "Ithaca is Gorges, But Dangerous" - Grant Johnson
- Best Television/Video News Story (Student Competition) - Honorable Mention - "Ithaca Starbucks Employees Campaign to Unionize" - Emily Hung

Society of Professional Journalists (SPJ)

2022 Mark of Excellence Awards - Region 1

- Television In-Depth Reporting - First Place - "ICTV Reports - Ithaca Starbucks Employees Campaign to Unionize" - Emily Hung
- Television Sports Reporting - First Place - "Sports Final - IC Mental Health Performance" - Josh Hobbs
- Best All-Around Television Newscast - First Place - "Newswatch 11-15-2022" - Grant Johnson, David Teska, Paige Morrissey and Jordan Broking
- Best All-Around Television News Magazine - Finalist - "ICTV Reports - A Time of Reform 10-26-2022" - Brooke Vogel, Inbaayini Anbarasan Griffin Homan and Jordan Broking

Society of Professional Journalists (SPJ)

2012 Mark of Excellence Awards - Region 1

- Third Place, Newswatch 16

College Broadcasters, Inc. (CBI)

2011 National Student Production Awards

- Best Comedy - Finalist - "To A Pulp" - Joe Killeen and Nate Breton
- Best Promo - Finalist - "ICTV - It's Everywhere" - Nick Righi
- Best PSA - Finalist - "Take Back the Tap" - Nick Righi and Erik Keto
- Best Sportscast - Finalist - "Hold That Thought" - Alex Haubenstock and Jason Rickel
- Best Documentary / Public Affairs - Finalist - "Invading the Everglades - Nick Righi

Society of Professional Journalists (SPJ)

2011 Mark of Excellence Awards - Region 1

- First Place, Newswatch 16

Society of Professional Journalists (SPJ)

2010 Mark of Excellence Awards - Region 1

- Best Regularly Scheduled Local News Program - First Place - Newswatch 16
- Best News Story - First Place - "Newswatch 16: Best Shooting in Ithaca"
- Third, Newswatch 16

College Broadcasters, Inc. (CBI)

2009 National Student Production Awards

- Best Sportscast - First Place - "Sports Final" - Jodi Eisenberg, Dana Matson, Kevin Cartini and Matt McLaughlin. Sports Director Tom Wrede.
- Best Newscast - First Place - "Newswatch 16" - Becky Goodling. News Director Bryan Mercer.
- Best Student Media Website - Finalist - "ICTV.org"
- Best General Entertainment Program - Finalist - "Entertainment 16" - Andrea Teplitsky, Mariel Rubin and Faryn Shiro.
- Best Promo - Finalist - "ICTV.org" - Matt Baldovsky
- Best Live Sports Production - Finalist - "Bombers Football vs. Frostburg State" - Allison Gainza and Ryan Boyce
- Best Live Sports Production - Finalist - "Bombers Women's Basketball vs. Stevens" - Allison Gainza and Jodi Eisenberg
- Best Special Broadcast - Finalist - "ICTV 50th Anniversary" - Stu Kenny

Education Campus Television Administrators (AHECTA)

2009 Awards

- Grand Prize - "Busking the Big Apple" - Chris Cucci, Chris Burt, and Sarah Justine Woodhouse

New York State Associated Press Broadcasters Association

2009 College Television Competition

- Best Regularly Scheduled Local News Program - First Place - "Newswatch 16" - Becky Goodling. News Director Bryan Mercer
