= 2019 Framingham State Rams football team =

American college football season

2019 Framingham State Rams football

MASCAC champion

NCAA Division III First Round, L 21–58 at Wesley
- Conference: Massachusetts State Collegiate Athletic Conference
- Record: 8–3 (8–0 MASCAC)
- Head coach: Tom Kelley (16th season)
- Offensive coordinator: Aynsley Rosenbaum (12th season)
- Defensive coordinator: Mike Landers (2nd season)
- Home stadium: Bowditch Field

2019 Massachusetts State Collegiate Athletic Conference football standings
	Conf.			Overall
Team	W		L	W		L
Framingham State $^	8	–	0	8	–	3
Western Connecticut	6	–	2	8	–	3
Bridgewater State	6	–	2	6	–	4
UMass Dartmouth	5	–	3	7	–	3
Massachusetts Maritime	4	–	4	6	–	4
Plymouth State	4	–	4	6	–	4
Westfield State	2	–	6	2	–	8
Fitchburg State	1	–	7	2	–	8
Worcester State	0	–	8	0	–	10
$ – Conference champion; ^ – NCAA Division III playoff participant

The 2019 Framingham State Rams football team represented Framingham State University as a member of the Massachusetts State Collegiate Athletic Conference (MASCAC) during the 2019 NCAA Division III football season. The Rams, led by 16th-year head coach Tom Kelley, played their home games at Bowditch Field in Framingham, Massachusetts.

== Schedule ==
Date	Time	Opponent	Site	Result	Attendance	Source
September 6	7:15 p.m.	at Endicott*	Hempstead Stadium; Beverly, MA	L 27–55	3,010	
September 14	12:00 p.m.	at Brockport*	Bob Boozer Field; Brockport, NY	L 0–14	2,567	
September 21	12:00 p.m.	Westfield State^{†}	Bowditch Field; Framingham, MA	W 48–21	1,404	
October 5	12:00 p.m.	UMass Dartmouth	Bowditch Field; Framingham, MA	W 39–33	1,404	
October 12	12:00 p.m.	at Fitchburg State	Elliot Field; Fitchburg, MA	W 56–7	1,343	
October 19	1:00 p.m.	at Plymouth State	Currier Stadium; Plymouth, NH	W 34–0	2,416	
October 26	12:00 p.m.	Western Connecticut	Bowditch Field; Framingham, MA	W 39–14	1,004	
November 2	12:00 p.m.	at Massachusetts Maritime	Clean Harbors Stadium; Buzzards Bay, MA	W 16–6		
November 9	12:00 p.m.	Bridgewater State	Bowditch Field; Framingham, MA	W 40–20	1,036	
November 16	12:00 p.m.	at Worcester State	Coughlin Field; Worcester, MA	W 47–6	472	
November 23	12:00 p.m.	at No. 10 Wesley (DE)*	Drass Field; Dover, DE (NCAA Division III First Round)	L 21–58	890	
*Non-conference game; ^{†}Homecoming; Rankings from AFCA Poll released prior to the game; All times are in Eastern time
