= 2019 UMass Dartmouth Corsairs football team =

American college football season

2019 UMass Dartmouth Corsairs football
- Conference: Massachusetts State Collegiate Athletic Conference
- Record: 7–3 (5–3 MASCAC)
- Head coach: Mark Robichaud (13th season)
- Offensive coordinator: Josh Sylvester (9th season)
- Defensive coordinator: Steve Faniel (13th season)
- Home stadium: Cressy Field

2019 Massachusetts State Collegiate Athletic Conference football standings
	Conf.			Overall
Team	W		L	W		L
Framingham State $^	8	–	0	8	–	3
Western Connecticut	6	–	2	8	–	3
Bridgewater State	6	–	2	6	–	4
UMass Dartmouth	5	–	3	7	–	3
Massachusetts Maritime	4	–	4	6	–	4
Plymouth State	4	–	4	6	–	4
Westfield State	2	–	6	2	–	8
Fitchburg State	1	–	7	2	–	8
Worcester State	0	–	8	0	–	10
$ – Conference champion; ^ – NCAA Division III playoff participant

The 2019 UMass Dartmouth Corsairs football team represented the University of Massachusetts Dartmouth as a member of the Massachusetts State Collegiate Athletic Conference (MASCAC) during the 2019 NCAA Division III football season. The Corsairs, led by 13th-year head coach Mark Robichaud, played their home games at Cressy Field in Dartmouth, Massachusetts.

== Schedule ==
Date	Time	Opponent	Site	Result	Attendance
September 7	12:00 p.m.	Alfred State*	Cressy Field; Dartmouth, MA	W 54–7	1,033
September 14	12:00 p.m.	Husson*	Cressy Field; Dartmouth, MA	W 48–41 ^{OT}	1,117
September 21	4:30 p.m.	Fitchburg State	Cressy Field; Dartmouth, MA	W 37–14	1,442
September 28	2:00 p.m.	Plymouth State	Cressy Field; Dartmouth, MA	W 21–14	1,102
October 5	12:00 p.m.	at Framingham State	Bowditch Field; Framingham, MA	L 33–39	1,404
October 19	3:00 p.m.	at Bridgewater State	Swenson Field; Bridgewater, MA	L 20–56	1,865
October 26	3:00 p.m.	Worcester State	Cressy Field; Dartmouth, MA	W 46–8	1,250
November 2	6:00 p.m.	at Western Connecticut	The WAC; Danbury, CT	W 28–12	444
November 9	12:00 p.m.	Massachusetts Maritime	Cressy Field; Dartmouth, MA	L 14–28	1,284
November 16	12:00 p.m.	at Westfield State	Alumni Field; Westfield, MA	W 19–13	722
*Non-conference game; All times are in Eastern time

== Game summaries ==
=== Alfred State ===
Game One – UMass Dartmouth Corsairs (0–0) vs Alfred State Pioneers (0–0)

Quarter	1	2	3	4	Total
Alfred State	0	0	0	7	7
UMass Dartmouth	6	27	14	7	54

at Cressy Field • Dartmouth, Massachusetts

- Date: Saturday, September 3, 2019
- Game time: 12:00 p.m. EST
- Game weather: Temperature: 59 °F (15 °C) • Weather: Overcast
- Game attendance: 1,033
- Referee: Gregg Camara

Game information

First quarter

- (13:55) UMD – Abbi Bamgbose 30 Yd Pass, PAT Failed (UMass Dartmouth 6–0)

Second quarter

- (13:21) UMD – Jacen Hudson 24 Yd Pass, James Tooker Kick (UMass Dartmouth 13–0)
- (11:02) UMD – Brendan Cuthill 1 Yd Pass, PAT Failed (UMass Dartmouth 19–0)
- (6:37) UMD – Jeremy Jackson 11 Yd Pass, James Tooker Kick (UMass Dartmouth 26–0)
- (3:19) UMD – Brendan Cuthill 11 Yd Pass, James Tooker Kick (UMass Dartmouth 33–0)

Third quarter

- (13:15) UMD – Leroy Brown 62 Yd Pass, James Tooker Kick (UMass Dartmouth 40–0)
- (6:38) UMD – Olawale Junaid 17 Yd Run, James Tooker Kick (UMass Dartmouth 47–0)

Fourth quarter

- (13:45) UMD – Luis Gonzalez 34 Yd Run, James Tooker Kick (UMass Dartmouth 54–0)
- (11:53) ASU – Darrius Nichols 38 Yd Pass, Michael Zimmerman Kick (UMass Dartmouth 54–7)

Statistics	UMD	ALS
First downs	12	26
Plays–yards	69–170	64–579
Rushes–yards	99	197
Passing yards	71	382
Passing: comp–att–int	5–23–2	24–34–1
Time of possession	34:41	25:19

Team	Category	Player	Statistics
Alfred State	Passing	Dashown Wilson	5/23, 71 yards, 1 TD, 2 INT
Alfred State	Rushing	Ronnie Clark	15 carries, 96 yards
Alfred State	Receiving	Darrius Nichols	1 reception, 38 yards, 1 TD
UMass Dartmouth	Passing	Stephen Gacioch	19/28, 338 yards, 6 TD, 1 INT
UMass Dartmouth	Rushing	Olawale Juniad	5 carries, 53 yards, 1 TD
UMass Dartmouth	Receiving	Leroy Brown	4 receptions, 134 yards, 1 TD

=== Husson ===
Game Two – UMass Dartmouth Corsairs (1–0) vs Husson Eagles (0–0)

Quarter	1	2	3	4	OT	Total
Husson	21	6	7	7	0	41
UMass Dartmouth	14	6	14	7	7	48

at Cressy Field • Dartmouth, Massachusetts

- Date: Saturday, September 14, 2019
- Game time: 12:00 p.m. EST
- Game weather: Temperature: 69 °F (21 °C) • Weather: Sunny
- Game attendance: 1,117
- Referee: Craig McDonnell

Game information

First quarter

- (9:30) HUS – Shawn Noel, Jr. 2 Yd Run, Devin Pickett Kick (Husson 7–0)
- (7:51) UMD – Leroy Brown 10 Yd Pass, James Tooker Kick (Tied 7–7)
- (6:19) HUS – Aidan Hogan 54 Yd Pass, Devin Pickett Kick (Husson 14–7)
- (2:54) UMD – Jacob Francis 1 Yd Run, James Tooker Kick (Tied 14–14)
- (0:08) HUS – Aidan Hogan 22 Yd Pass, Devin Pickett Kick (Husson 21–14)

Second quarter

- (4:02) UMD – Douglas Machado 48 Yd Pass, PAT Failed (Husson 21–20)
- (0:33) HUS – Aidan Hogan 7 Yd Pass, PAT Failed (Husson 27–20)

Third quarter

- (13:11) UMD – Douglas Machado 66 Yd Pass, James Tooker Kick (Tied 27–27)
- (3:16) HUS – Tyler Halls 36 Yd Pass, Devin Pickett Kick (Husson 34–27)
- (1:40) UMD – Pedro DelToro 59 Yd Pass, James Tooker Kick (Tied 34–34)

Fourth quarter

- (3:38) UMD – Olawale Juniad 9 Yd Run, James Tooker Kick (UMass Dartmouth 34–41)
- (0:39) HUS – Aidan Hogan 7 Yd Pass, Devin Pickett Kick (Tied 41–41)

Overtime

- (15:00) UMD – Abbi Bamgbose 23 Yd Pass, James Tooker Kick (UMass Dartmouth 41–48)

Statistics	UMD	HUS
First downs	22	27
Plays–yards	82–401	73–580
Rushes–yards	62	68
Passing yards	339	512
Passing: comp–att–int	22–40–0	26–43–2
Time of possession	35:05	24:55

Team	Category	Player	Statistics
Husson	Passing	David Morrison	22/40, 339 yards, 5 TD
Husson	Rushing	Shawn Noel, Jr.	38 carries, 99 yards, 1 TD
Husson	Receiving	Tyler Halls	13 receptions, 185 yards, 1 TD
UMass Dartmouth	Passing	Stephen Gacioch	26/42, 512 yards, 5 TD, 2 INT
UMass Dartmouth	Rushing	Stephen Gacioch	17 carries, 27 yards
UMass Dartmouth	Receiving	Douglas Machado	6 receptions, 158 yards, 2 TD

=== Fitchburg State ===
Game Three – UMass Dartmouth Corsairs (2–0) vs Fitchburg State Falcons (1–2)

Quarter	1	2	3	4	Total
Fitchburg State	0	6	0	7	13
UMass Dartmouth	20	0	14	3	37

at Cressy Field • Dartmouth, Massachusetts

- Date: Saturday, September 21, 2019
- Game time: 4:30 p.m. EST
- Game weather: Temperature: 78 °F (26 °C) • Weather: Sunny
- Game attendance: 1,442
- Referee: Ron Patry

Game information

First quarter

- (10:48) UMD – Jacob Francis 3 Yd Run, James Tooker Kick (UMass Dartmouth 7–0)
- (4:41) UMD – Jacob Francis 3 Yd Run, PAT Failed (UMass Dartmouth 13–0)
- (0:12) UMD – Leroy Brown 4 Yd Pass, James Tooker Kick (UMass Dartmouth 20–0)

Second quarter

- (11:20) FIT – Melchior Lynch 26 Yd Field Goal (UMass Dartmouth 20–3)
- (0:29) FIT – Melchior Lynch 30 Yd Field Goal (UMass Dartmouth 20–6)

Third quarter

- (8:43) UMD – Brendan Cuthill 3 Yd Pass, James Tooker Kick (UMass Dartmouth 27–6)
- (1:15) UMD – Jacob Francis 2 Yd Run, James Tooker Kick (UMass Dartmouth 34–6)

Fourth quarter

- (8:31) UMD – James Tooker 28 Yd Field Goal (UMass Dartmouth 37–6)
- (7:24) FIT – Jesse Brown 49 Yd Pass, Melchior Lynch Kick (UMass Dartmouth 37–13)

Statistics	FIT	UMD
First downs	12	25
Plays–yards	67–195	80–421
Rushes–yards	49	232
Passing yards	146	189
Passing: comp–att–int	10–35–1	14–30–1
Time of possession	28:24	31:36

Team	Category	Player	Statistics
Fitchburg State	Passing	Connor Fitzsimons	10/35, 146 yards, 1 TD, 1 INT
Fitchburg State	Rushing	Fernando Santiago	15 carries, 40 yards
Fitchburg State	Receiving	Jesse Brown	2 receptions, 77 yards, 1 TD
UMass Dartmouth	Passing	Stephen Gacioch	14/28, 189 yards, 2 TD, 1 INT
UMass Dartmouth	Rushing	Jacob Francis	13 carries, 63 yards, 3 TD
UMass Dartmouth	Receiving	Jeremy Jackson	1 reception, 48 yards

=== Plymouth State ===
Game Four – UMass Dartmouth Corsairs (3–0) vs Plymouth State Panthers (3–0)

Quarter	1	2	3	4	Total
Plymouth State	7	7	0	0	14
UMass Dartmouth	14	7	0	0	21

at Cressy Field • Dartmouth, Massachusetts

- Date: Saturday, September 28, 2019
- Game time: 2:00 p.m. EST
- Game weather: Temperature: 73 °F (23 °C) • Weather: Sunny
- Game attendance: 1,102
- Referee: Bill Gosselin

Game information

First quarter

- (6:35) UMD – Stephen Gacioch 3 Yd Run, James Tooker Kick (UMass Dartmouth 7–0)
- (2:55) PSU – David Hamilton 17 Yd Pass, Dan Carey Kick (Tied 7–7)
- (0:00) UMD – Pedro DelToro 5 Yd Pass, James Tooker Kick (UMass Dartmouth 14–7)

Second quarter

- (5:49) UMD – Jeremy Jackson 3 Yd Pass, James Tooker Kick (UMass Dartmouth 21–7)
- (1:12) PSU – Gavin Moody 12 Yd Pass, Dan Carey Kick (UMass Dartmouth 21–14)

Third quarter

No scoring

Fourth quarter

No scoring

Statistics	PSU	UMD
First downs	10	29
Plays–yards	47–115	82–433
Rushes–yards	30	128
Passing yards	85	305
Passing: comp–att–int	6–10–0	32–45–0
Time of possession	27:49	32:07

Team	Category	Player	Statistics
Plymouth State	Passing	Brett Lavanchy	6/10, 85 yards, 2 TD
Plymouth State	Rushing	David Hamilton	21 carries, 51 yards
Plymouth State	Receiving	Terrell Lewis	1 reception, 38 yards
UMass Dartmouth	Passing	Stephen Gacioch	32/45, 305 yards, 2 TD
UMass Dartmouth	Rushing	Stephen Gacioch	22 carries, 104 yards, 1 TD
UMass Dartmouth	Receiving	Jacen Hudson	7 receptions, 64 yards

=== at Framingham State ===
Game Five – UMass Dartmouth Corsairs (4–0) vs Framingham State Rams (1–2)

Quarter	1	2	3	4	Total
UMass Dartmouth	14	12	0	7	33
Framingham State	13	0	13	13	39

at Bowditch Field • Framingham, Massachusetts

- Date: Saturday, October 5, 2019
- Game time: 12:00 p.m. EST
- Game attendance: 1,404
- Referee: William Gosseli

Game information

First quarter

- (11:09) UMD – Stephen Gacioch 13 Yd Run, James Tooker Kick (UMass Dartmouth 7–0)
- (9:43) FRA – Jacob Maher 39 Yd Pass, Henrique DeBoni Kick (Tied 7–7)
- (5:47) UMD – Douglas Machado 21 Yd Pass, James Tooker Kick (UMass Dartmouth 14–7)
- (5:49) FRA – Jacob Maher 69 Yd Pass, Kick Blocked (UMass Dartmouth 14–13)

Second quarter

- (8:04) UMD – Douglas Machado 31 Yd Pass, James Tooker Kick (UMass Dartmouth 21–13)
- (4:12) UMD – Team Safety (UMass Dartmouth 23–13)
- (1:41) UMD – James Tooker 20 Yd Field Goal (UMass Dartmouth 26–13)

Third quarter

- (10:29) FRA – Austin Nunn 54 Yd Pass, Daniels Lathum Kick (UMass Dartmouth 26–20)
- (3:20) FRA – Jacob Maher 97 Yd Pass, PAT Failed (Tied 26–26)

Fourth quarter

- (14:06) UMD – Stephen Gacioch 2 Yd Run, James Tooker Kick (UMass Dartmouth 33–26)
- (10:51) FRA – Elijah Nichols 26 Yd Pass, Daniels Lathum Kick (Tied 33–33)
- (5:37) FRA – Devaun Ford 4 Yd Run, Kick Blocked (Framingham State 33–39)

Statistics	UMD	FRA
First downs	33	15
Plays–yards	99–516	54–520
Rushes–yards	173	98
Passing yards	343	422
Passing: comp–att–int	34–60–2	14–25–0
Time of possession	37:46	22:14

Team	Category	Player	Statistics
UMass Dartmouth	Passing	Stephen Gacioch	34/59, 343 yards, 2 TD, 2 INT
UMass Dartmouth	Rushing	Stephen Gacioch	20 carries, 97 yards, 2 TD
UMass Dartmouth	Receiving	Douglas Machado	6 receptions, 113 yards, 2 TD
Framingham State	Passing	Adam Wojenski	14/25, 422 yards, 5 TD
Framingham State	Rushing	Adam Wojenski	11 carries, 53 yards
Framingham State	Receiving	Jacob Maher	5 receptions, 215 yards, 3 TD

=== at Bridgewater State ===
Game Six – UMass Dartmouth Corsairs (4–1) vs Bridgewater State Bears (3–3)

Quarter	1	2	3	4	Total
UMass Dartmouth	7	7	6	0	20
Bridgewater State	27	22	7	0	56

at Swenson Field • Bridgewater, Massachusetts

- Date: Saturday, October 19, 2019
- Game time: 3:00 p.m. EST
- Game weather: Temperature: 59 °F (15 °C) • Weather: Sunny
- Game attendance: 1,865
- Referee: Steve Walsh

Game information

First quarter

- (14:15) BSU – William Wyatts 61 Yd Pass, Thomas Fay Kick (Bridgewater State 7–0)
- (12:47) UMD – Leroy Brown 11 Yd Pass, James Tooker Kick (Tied 7–7)
- (11:54) BSU – William Wyatts 64 Yd Pass, Thomas Fay Kick (Bridgewater State 14–7)
- (9:29) BSU – Stefano D'Emilia 1 Yd Run, PAT Failed (Bridgewater State 20–7)
- (2:34) BSU – Joseph Leanos 13 Yd Pass, Thomas Fay Kick (Bridgewater State 27–7)

Second quarter

- (11:56) UMD – Jacen Hudson 2 Yd Pass, James Tooker Kick (Bridgewater State 27–14)
- (4:49) BSU – Joseph Leanos 30 Yd Pass, Stefano D'Emilia 2PT Conversion Pass (Bridgewater State 35–14)
- (2:11) BSU – Stefano D'Emilia 5 Yd Run, Thomas Fay Kick (Bridgewater State 42–14)
- (1:26) BSU – T.J. Hairston 15 Yd Pass, Thomas Fay Kick (Bridgewater State 49–14)

Third quarter

- (9:08) BSU – Stefano D'Emilia 1 Yd Run, Thomas Fay Kick (Bridgewater State 56–14)
- (6:06) UMD – Jay Bast 12 Yd Interception, PAT Failed (Bridgewater State 56–20)

Fourth quarter

No scoring

Statistics	UMD	BSU
First downs	23	22
Plays–yards	83–367	71–464
Rushes–yards	111	119
Passing yards	256	345
Passing: comp–att–int	22–48–5	15–28–2
Time of possession	28:37	31:23

Team	Category	Player	Statistics
UMass Dartmouth	Passing	Stephen Gacioch	18/38, 208 yards, 2 TD, 4 INT
UMass Dartmouth	Rushing	Tylan Mendes	6 carries, 34 yards
UMass Dartmouth	Receiving	Jacen Hudson	8 receptions, 75 yards, 1 TD
Bridgewater State	Passing	Stefano D'Emilia	15/27, 345 yards, 5 TD, 2 INT
Bridgewater State	Rushing	Stefano D'Emilia	12 carries, 53 yards, 3 TD
Bridgewater State	Receiving	William Watts	4 receptions, 138 yards, 2 TD

=== Worcester State ===
Game Seven – UMass Dartmouth Corsairs (4–2) vs Worcester State (0–6)

Quarter	1	2	3	4	Total
Worcester State	6	0	0	2	8
UMass Dartmouth	20	6	14	6	46

at Cressy Field • Dartmouth, Massachusetts

- Date: Saturday, October 26, 2019
- Game time: 3:00 p.m. EST
- Game weather: Temperature: 64 °F (18 °C) • Weather: Cloudy
- Game attendance: 1,250
- Referee: Ron Patry

Game information

First quarter

- (12:33) UMD – Stephen Gacioch 11 Yd Run, PAT Failed (UMass Dartmouth 6–0)
- (9:34) UMD – Stephen Gacioch 5 Yd Run, James Tooker Kick (UMass Dartmouth 13–0)
- (8:50) WOR – Kyle Wall 24 Yd Field Goal (UMass Dartmouth 13–3)
- (6:03) UMD – Abbi Bamgbose 1 Yd Pass, James Tooker Kick (UMass Dartmouth 20–3)
- (1:30) WOR – Kyle Wall 33 Yd Field Goal (UMass Dartmouth 20–6)

Second quarter

- (14:53) UMD – Stephen Gacioch 3 Yd Run, PAT Failed (UMass Dartmouth 26–6)

Third quarter

- (10:05) UMD – Jacob Francis 2 Yd Run, James Tooker Kick (UMass Dartmouth 33–6)
- (3:41) UMD – Javien Delgado 36 Yd Interception, James Tooker Kick (UMass Dartmouth 40–6)

Fourth quarter

- (3:58) UMD – Winston DeLeon 8 Yd Run, PAT Failed (UMass Dartmouth 46–6)
- (3:58) WOR – Michael Elsey 98 Yd PAT Return (UMass Dartmouth 46–8)

Statistics	WOR	UMD
First downs	15	29
Plays–yards	78–292	81–519
Rushes–yards	62	219
Passing yards	230	300
Passing: comp–att–int	14–46–4	19–37–1
Time of possession	31:21	28:07

Team	Category	Player	Statistics
Worcester State	Passing	Aaron-Moses Williams	13/38, 228 yards, 2 INT
Worcester State	Rushing	Stephen Miranda	4 carries, 19 yards
Worcester State	Receiving	Cam Kergo	5 receptions, 102 yards
UMass Dartmouth	Passing	Stephen Gacioch	18/31, 292 yards, 1 TD
UMass Dartmouth	Rushing	Luis Gonzalez	12 carries, 86 yards
UMass Dartmouth	Receiving	Leroy Brown	5 receptions, 119 yards

=== at Western Connecticut ===
Game Eight – UMass Dartmouth Corsairs (5–2) vs Western Connecticut Colonials (6–1)

Quarter	1	2	3	4	Total
UMass Dartmouth	7	7	0	14	28
Western Connecticut	0	6	0	6	12

at The WAC • Danbury, Connecticut

- Date: Saturday, November 2, 2019
- Game time: 6:00 p.m. EST
- Game weather: Temperature: 45 °F (7 °C) • Weather: Fall–like
- Game attendance: 444
- Referee: Bill Zeoli

Game information

First quarter

- (8:19) UMD – Abbi Bamgbose 23 Yd Pass, James Tooker Kick (UMass Dartmouth 7–0)

Second quarter

- (9:54) WCSU – Anthony Via 6 Yd Run, PAT Failed (UMass Dartmouth 7–6)
- (4:34) UMD – Abbi Bamgbose 20 Yd Pass, James Tooker Kick (UMass Dartmouth 14–6)

Third quarter

No scoring

Fourth quarter

- (12:11) WCSU – Chris Pascall 5 Yd Pass, PAT Failed (UMass Dartmouth 14–12)
- (7:39) UMD – Luis Gonzalez 2 Yd Run, James Tooker Kick (UMass Dartmouth 21–12)
- (1:48) UMD – Luis Gonzalez 2 Yd Run, James Tooker Kick (UMass Dartmouth 28–12)

Statistics	UMD	WCSU
First downs	25	19
Plays–yards	83–389	79–287
Rushes–yards	243	112
Passing yards	146	175
Passing: comp–att–int	12–27–2	14–46–0
Time of possession	31:44	27:21

Team	Category	Player	Statistics
UMass Dartmouth	Passing	Ryan Qualey	9/21, 112 yards, 2 TD, 2 INT
UMass Dartmouth	Rushing	Luis Gonzalez	29 carries, 140 yards
UMass Dartmouth	Receiving	Abbi Bamgbose	5 receptions, 81 yards, 2 TD
Western Connecticut	Passing	David James	7/27, 96 yards
Western Connecticut	Rushing	Anthony Via	19 carries, 102 yards, 1 TD
Western Connecticut	Receiving	Will Daniels	3 receptions, 45 yards

=== Massachusetts Maritime ===
Game Nine – UMass Dartmouth Corsairs (6–2) vs Massachusetts Maritime Buccaneers (5–3)

Quarter	1	2	3	4	Total
Massachusetts Maritime	7	7	7	7	28
UMass Dartmouth	0	0	7	7	14

at Cressy Field • Dartmouth, Massachusetts

- Date: Saturday, November 9, 2019
- Game time: 12:00 p.m. EST
- Game weather: Temperature: 37 °F (3 °C) • Weather: Sunny
- Game attendance: 1,284
- Referee: Bill Zeoli

Game information

First quarter

- (10:23) MMA – Matt Long 79 Yd Run, George Lampros Kick (Massachusetts Maritime 7–0)

Second quarter

- (6:09) MMA – Matt Long 1 Yd Run, George Lampros Kick (Massachusetts Maritime 14–0)

Third quarter

- (13:12) MMA – Ryan McNally 23 Yd Pass, George Lampros Kick (Massachusetts Maritime 21–0)
- (2:26) UMD – Abbi Bamgbose 46 Yd Pass, James Tooker Kick (Massachusetts Maritime 21–7)

Fourth quarter

- (13:46) UMD – Abbi Bamgbose 26 Yd Pass, James Tooker Kick (Massachusetts Maritime 21–14)
- (12:45) MMA – Matt Long 5 Yd Run, George Lampros Kick (Massachusetts Maritime 28–14)

Statistics	MMA	UMD
First downs	10	18
Plays–yards	59–388	77–311
Rushes–yards	203	82
Passing yards	185	229
Passing: comp–att–int	6–13–0	21–50–1
Time of possession	33:00	27:00

Team	Category	Player	Statistics
Massachusetts Maritime	Passing	Matt Long	5/12, 162 yards
Massachusetts Maritime	Rushing	Matt Long	19 carries, 157 yards, 3 TD
Massachusetts Maritime	Receiving	Will Bennett	2 receptions, 146 yards
UMass Dartmouth	Passing	Ryan Qualey	18/45, 214 yards, 2 TD, 1 INT
UMass Dartmouth	Rushing	Luis Gonzalez	10 carries, 57 yards
UMass Dartmouth	Receiving	Abbi Bamgbose	6 receptions, 132 yards, 2 TD

=== at Westfield State ===
Game Ten – UMass Dartmouth Corsairs (6–3) vs Westfield State Owls (2–7)

Quarter	1	2	3	4	Total
UMass Dartmouth	0	13	0	6	19
Westfield State	0	0	11	2	13

at Alumni Field • Westfield, Massachusetts

- Date: Saturday, November 16, 2019
- Game time: 12:00 p.m. EST
- Game weather: Temperature: Mid 30s • Weather: Clear
- Game attendance: 722
- Referee: Craig McDonnell

Game information

First quarter

No scoring

Second quarter

- (10:53) UMD – Luis Gonzalez 55 Yd Run, PAT Failed (UMass Dartmouth 6–0)
- (0:45) UMD – Abbi Bamgbose 13 Yd Pass, James Tooker Kick (UMass Dartmouth 13–0)

Third quarter

- (11:33) WSU – Alijah Ellis 24 Yd Fumble, Peyton Capizzi 2PT Conversion Run (UMass Dartmouth 13–8)
- (6:41) WSU – Corey Pooler 35 Yd Field Goal (UMass Dartmouth 13–11)

Fourth quarter

- (1:39) UMD – Jacob Francis 15 Yd Run, PAT Failed (UMass Dartmouth 19–11)
- (1:39) WSU – Alijah Ellis 98 Yd PAT Return (UMass Dartmouth 19–13)

Statistics	UMD	WSU
First downs	18	14
Plays–yards	73–285	78–160
Rushes–yards	177	61
Passing yards	108	99
Passing: comp–att–int	16–32–0	10–37–2
Time of possession	29:07	30:53

Team	Category	Player	Statistics
UMass Dartmouth	Passing	Jacob Francis	16/32, 108 yards, 1 TD
UMass Dartmouth	Rushing	Jacob Francis	30 carries, 118 yards, 1 TD
UMass Dartmouth	Receiving	Pedro DelToro	5 receptions, 57 yards
Westfield State	Passing	Andrew Peltier	7/24, 70 yards, 1 INT
Westfield State	Rushing	Shane Clark	18 carries, 38 yards
Westfield State	Receiving	Evan Garvey	5 receptions, 37 yards

== Personnel ==
=== Coaching staff ===
Name	Position
Mark Robichaud	Head coach
Steve Faniel	Assistant head coach/defensive coordinator
Josh Sylvester	Offensive coordinator
Ryan Struthers	Special teams coordinator
Ryan McCormack	Assistant coach
Justin Borden	Assistant coach
Michael Slaughter Jr.	Assistant coach
Joe Teixeira	Assistant coach
Jason Azulay	Assistant coach
Rick Martin	Assistant coach

=== Roster ===
2019 UMass Dartmouth Corsairs Football
Quarterbacks: 11 – Stephen Gacioch – Junior (6'2, 193); 12 – Jacob Francis – Junior (6', 215); 15 – Ryan Qualey – Freshman (6'3, 185); 17 – Anthony DeAngelis – Freshman (5'9, 170); 18 – Evan Judkins – Freshman (6', 180); 19 – Keenan Little – Sophomore (6'4, 200); Running backs: 6 – Olawale Junaid – Junior (5'10, 200); 20 – Luis Gonzalez – Freshman (6', 190); 22 – Gayee Myers – Junior (5'5, 175); 27 – Winston DeLeon – Freshman (5'10, 200); 32 – Tylan Mendes – Freshman (5'10, 190); 35 – Caleb Goodison – Freshman (5'6, 170); 42 – Justin Cote – Freshman (5'9, 180); 92 – Julien Soto – Freshman (5'8, 190); 95 – Khadir Green – Freshman (5'6, 175); Wide receivers: 2 – Leroy Brown – Junior (6'1, 195); 4 – Abbi Bamgbose – Senior (5'9, 185); 13 – Kevin Gonzalez – Senior (5'9, 170); 14 – Paul Osayande – Sophomore (6'2, 180); 33 – Wayman Jenkins – Freshman (6', 205); 81 – Jacen Hudson – Senior (5'10, 190); 82 – Fabrice Rene – Senior (6'1, 195); 83 – Brett Mancini – Freshman (5'8, 175); 84 – Zack Leo – Freshman (5'10, 175); 85 – Douglas Machado – Junior (5'10, 175); 86 – Jeremy Jackson – Senior (6'1, 220); 87 – David Engler – Junior (5'11, 180); 88 – Diondre Ellis – Freshman (6', 180); 89 – Jake Gelinas – Freshman (5'7, 160)	Offensive linemen: 50 – Bruno Abbatessa – Junior (6', 260); 55 – Calvin Contreras – Freshman (6'4, 260); 56 – Jonathan Vilmont – Freshman (6'1, 260); 58 – Gage DaSilva – Sophomore (6'1, 260); 63 – Liam Whaley – Freshman (6', 285); 64 – Zach Cardelli – Freshman (6', 270); 65 – Trevor McCarthy – Junior (6'1, 275); 66 – Zac Hodges – Junior (6'3, 270); 70 – Logan Burda – Freshman (6'3, 250); 72 – Brandon DiChiaro – Freshman (6'3, 290); 73 – Andrew Paulus – Sophomore (6'1, 265); 74 – Connor McClanan – Freshman (6', 290); 75 – Carlos Goncalves-Robalo – Freshman (6'1, 310); 78 – Saih Hill-Gore – Freshman (6'1, 260)	Defensive linemen: 48 – Josh Lacerte – Freshman (6', 210); 52 – Kevin Flynn – Freshman (6'2, 250); 54 – Kyle Kauzens – Sophomore (6'1, 205); 59 – Adam Kabir – Freshman (6'1, 240); 60 – Noah Casado – Freshman (6', 265); 61 – Mekhi Geter – Sophomore (6'1, 250); 62 – Jon Acosta – Freshman (6', 265); 67 – Ethan Blake – Freshman (5'9, 285); 76 – Xavier Deloney-Phillips – Freshman (6'1, 225); 77 – Marcus Elysee – Junior (6'2, 270); 79 – Chris Picard – Junior (6'2, 265); 90 – Jay Best – Sophomore (6'3, 285); 93 – Sean Reall – Junior (6'4, 225); 97 – Matt Gisonno – Sophomore (6'5, 225); 99 – Allston George – Senior (5'10, 275); Linebackers: 5 – Connor Russ – Senior (6'2, 220); 25 – Malik Gibson – Sophomore (6'2, 185); 40 – Nate Miller – Freshman (5'11, 240); 43 – Ty Couto – Freshman (5'11, 200); 44 – Matt Heaney – Junior (6', 200); 45 – Javien Delgado – Sophomore (5'11, 225); 51 – Lucas Roque – Freshman (5'8, 185); 53 – Lewy Baez-Troncoso – Freshman (5'9, 215); 57 – Nick Sorrentino – Freshman (5'10, 205); 69 – Bobby Reynolds – Freshman (5'11, 250)	Defensive backs: 1 – Tony Slaughter – Senior (6'2, 200); 7 – Mo Rainford – Senior (5'10, 200); 8 – Pedro DelToro – Junior (5'6, 158); 9 – Sam Krajewski – Junior (6'2, 176); 16 – Brendan Cuthill – Junior (6', 187); 21 – Adam Washington – Sophomore (6'3, 205); 23 – Tyler Nelli – Freshman (5'10, 165); 24 – Andrew Haase – Freshman (5'9, 170); 26 – JP Mason – Sophomore (6'1, 175); 28 – Will Tuttle – Freshman (5'8, 170); 29 – Pride Clark – Freshman (5'10, 185); 30 – Chris Gomes – Junior (5'11, 180); 31 – Stevie Kolodko – Freshman (6'1, 180); 34 – Jacob Burkhead – Junior (6', 180); 36 – Fernando Aguilar – Freshman (5'10, 180); 37 – Chris Lopez – Freshman (6', 185); 38 – Steven Bohaboy – Freshman (6', 185); 39 – Luke LaBonte – Freshman (6'2, 185); 47 – Isaac Hart – Freshman (6', 190); 49 – Connor Donohue – Freshman (5'9, 160); 91 – Tyirque Dasilva – Freshman (5'8, 175); 98 – Walter Lazare – Freshman (5'10, 180); Placekicker: 96 – James Tooker – Junior (5'11, 165)
Source and player details, 2019 UMass Dartmouth Corsairs (11/18/2022)

== Statistics ==
=== Team ===
	UMass Dartmouth	Opp
Scoring	320	231
Points per game	32.0	32.1
First downs	253	151
Rushing	98	53
Passing	123	76
Penalty	32	22
Rushing yards	1,937	1,327
Avg per play	4.2	2.3
Avg per game	163.0	89.5
Rushing touchdowns	19	9
Passing yards	2,770	2,097
Att–Comp–Int	406–220–15	303–116–1
Avg per pass	6.82	6.92
Avg per game	277.0	209.7
Passing touchdowns	25	21
Total offense	4,400	2,992
Avg per game	440.0	299.2
Fumbles–Lost	13–7	5–4
Penalties–Yards	69–661	82–745
Avg per game	66.1	74.5

	UMass Dartmouth	Opp
Punts–Yards	53–1,974	68–2,320
Avg per punt	31.23	32.15
Time of possession/Game	29.38	30.13
3rd down conversions	50–142	47–161
4th down conversions	9–29	11–31
Touchdowns scored	46	31
Field goals–Attempts	2–4	5–7
PAT–Attempts	36–46	22–28

=== Individual leaders ===
==== Offense ====
Passing statistics
#	NAME	POS	RAT	CMP	ATT	YDS	AVG/G	CMP%	TD	INT	LONG
11	Stephen Gacioch	QB	143.16	164	277	2,221	277.63	59.21%	20	10	66
15	Ryan Qualey	QB	86.35	37	88	426	71.0	42.05%	4	5	46
12	Jacob Francis	QB	85.98	16	33	108	10.8	48.48%	1	0	30
18	Evan Judkins	QB	85.20	3	5	15	1.67	60.0%	0	0	7
4	Abbi Bamgbose	WR	0.0	0	1	0	0.0	0.0%	0	0	0
88	Diondre Ellis	WR	0.0	0	1	0	0.0	0.0%	0	0	0
8	Douglas Machado	WR	0.0	0	1	0	0.0	0.0%	0	0	0
	TOTALS		124.43	220	406	2,770	277.0	54.19%	25	15	66

Rushing statistics
#	NAME	POS	ATT	YDS	AVG	TD	LONG
#	NAME	POS	ATT	YDS	AVG	TD	LONG
	TOTALS		ATT	YDS	AVG	TD	LONG

Receiving statistics
#	NAME	POS	CTH	YDS	AVG	TD	LONG
#	NAME	POS	CTH	YDS	AVG	TD	LONG
	TOTALS		CTH	YDS	AVG	TD	78

==== Special teams ====
Punting statistics
#	NAME	POS	PUNTS	AVG	LONG	YDS
#	NAME	POS	PUNTS	AVG	LONG	YDS
	TOTALS		PUNTS	AVG	LONG	YDS
