= Mike Strachan =

Michael or Mike Strachan may refer to:

- Mike Strachan (running back) (born 1953), former American football player
- Mike Strachan (wide receiver) (born 1997), American football player
- Michael Strachan (American football coach) (born c. 1968)
- Michael Strachan (businessman) (1919–2000), Scottish company director and author

== See also ==
- Michael Strahan (born 1971), American television personality, journalist, and former football player
- Michaela Strachan (born 1966), English television presenter and singer
