= 2021 Massachusetts State Collegiate Athletic Conference football season =

- Sport: Football
- Duration: September 3, 2020 – November 13, 2021
- Teams: 9
- Champions: Framingham State

Football seasons
- 2019 2022

2021 Massachusetts State Collegiate Athletic Conference football standings
	Conf.			Overall
Team	W		L	W		L
Framingham State $^	8	–	0	8	–	3
UMass Dartmouth	6	–	2	9	–	2
Bridgewater State	6	–	2	6	–	4
Plymouth State	5	–	3	5	–	5
Western Connecticut	4	–	4	5	–	5
Massachusetts Maritime	3	–	5	4	–	6
Worcester State	3	–	5	3	–	7
Westfield State	1	–	7	1	–	9
Fitchburg State	0	–	8	0	–	10
$ – Conference champion; ^ – NCAA Division III playoff participant

The 2021 Massachusetts State Collegiate Athletic Conference football season was the season of college football played by the nine member schools of the Massachusetts State Collegiate Athletic Conference (MASCAC) as part of the 2021 NCAA Division III football season. The Framingham State Rams were conference champions; compiling perfect 8–0 records against conference opponents.

== Conference overview ==
Conf. rank	Team	Head coach	Conf. record	Overall record	Points scored	Points against
1	Framingham State	Tom Kelley	8–0	8–3	306	210
T–2	UMass Dartmouth	Mark Robichaud	6–2	9–2	349	198
T–2	Bridgewater State	Joe Verria	6–2	6–4	294	223
4	Plymouth State	Paul Castonia	5–3	5–5	176	152
5	Western Connecticut	Joe Loth	4–4	5–5	303	216
T–6	Massachusetts Maritime	Jeremy Cameron	3–5	4–6	155	196
T–6	Worcester State	Adam Peloquin	3–5	3–7	217	428
8	Westfield State	Pete Kowalski	1–7	1–9	131	311
9	Fitchburg State	Scott Sperone	0–8	0–10	90	366

== Teams ==
=== Framingham State ===
2021 Framingham State Rams football

MASCAC champion

NCAA Division III First Round, L 0–45 at Muhlenberg
- Conference: Massachusetts State Collegiate Athletic Conference
- Record: 8–3 (8–0 MASCAC)
- Head coach: Tom Kelley (14th season)
- Offensive coordinator: Conor Tierney
- Defensive coordinator: Joe Pappagallo
- Home stadium: Bowditch Field

The 2021 Framingham State Rams football team represented Framingham State University as a member of the Massachusetts State Collegiate Athletic Conference (MASCAC) during the 2021 NCAA Division III football season. The Rams, led by 14th-year head coach Tom Kelley, played their home games at Bowditch Field in Framingham, Massachusetts.

Date	Opponent	Site	Result	Source
September 4	Brockport*	Bowditch Field; Framingham, MA	L 0–31	
September 11	at St. John Fisher*	Growney Stadium; Pittsford, NY	L 7–38	
September 18	UMass Dartmouth	Bowditch Field; Framingham, MA	W 45–21	
September 25	Westfield State	Bowditch Field; Framingham, MA	W 41–6	
October 2	at Plymouth State	Panther Field; Plymouth, NH	W 33–0	
October 9	at Fitchburg State	Elliot Field; Fitchburg, MA	W 35–0	
October 16	Western Connecticut	Bowditch Field; Framingham, MA	W 35–21	
October 30	at Massachusetts Maritime	Clean Harbors Stadium; Buzzards Bay, MA	W 23–14	
November 6	Bridgewater State	Bowditch Field; Framingham, MA	W 47–13	
November 13	at Worcester State	John F. Coughlin Field; Worcester, MA	W 40–21	
November 20	at Muhlenberg*	Scotty Wood Stadium; Allentown, PA	L 0–45 (First round)	
*Non-conference game

=== UMass Dartmouth ===
2021 UMass Dartmouth Corsairs football
- Conference: Massachusetts State Collegiate Athletic Conference
- Record: 9–2 (6–2 MASCAC)
- Head coach: Mark Robichaud (15th season)
- Home stadium: Cressy Field

The 2021 UMass Dartmouth Corsairs football team represented the University of Massachusetts Dartmouth as a member of the Massachusetts State Collegiate Athletic Conference (MASCAC) during the 2021 NCAA Division III football season. The Corsairs, led by 15th-year head coach Mark Robichaud, played their home games at Cressy Field in Dartmouth, Massachusetts.

Date	Opponent	Site	Result	Source
September 4	at Husson*	Winkin Complex; Bangor, ME	W 21–14	
September 11	Dean*	Cressy Field; Dartmouth, MA	W 48–29	
September 18	at Framingham State	Bowditch Field; Framingham, MA	L 21–45	
September 25	Worcester State	Cressy Field; Dartmouth, MA	W 52–7	
October 2	at Western Connecticut	The WAC; Danbury, CT	L 19–34	
October 9	Massachusetts Maritime	Cressy Field; Dartmouth, MA	W 26–10	
October 16	at Westfield State	Alumni Field; Westfield, MA	W 26–16	
October 23	Fitchburg State	Cressy Field; Dartmouth, MA	W 40–0	
October 30	at Bridgewater State	Swenson Field; Bridgewater, MA	W 26–20	
November 13	Plymouth State	Cressy Field; Dartmouth, MA	W 28–7	
November 20	Alfred State*	Cressy Field; Dartmouth, MA	W 42–16 (New England Bowl)	
*Non-conference game

=== Bridgewater State ===
2021 Bridgewater State Bears football
- Conference: Massachusetts State Collegiate Athletic Conference
- Record: 6–4 (6–2 MASCAC)
- Head coach: Joe Verria (6th season)
- Home stadium: Swenson Field

The 2021 Bridgewater State Bears football team represented Bridgewater State University as a member of the Massachusetts State Collegiate Athletic Conference (MASCAC) during the 2021 NCAA Division III football season. The Bears, led by 6th-year head coach Joe Verria, played their home games at Swenson Field in Bridgewater, Massachusetts.

Date	Opponent	Site	Result	Source
September 4	at Ithaca*	Butterfield Stadium; Ithaca, NY	L 20–52	
September 11	New England (ME)*	Swenson Field; Bridgewater, MA	L 20–23 (OT)	
September 18	Plymouth State	Swenson Field; Bridgewater, MA	W 27–24	
September 25	Western Connecticut	Swenson Field; Bridgewater, MA	W 21–17	
October 2	at Fitchburg State	Elliot Field; Fitchburg, MA	W 42–0	
October 9	at Worcester State	John F. Coughlin Field; Worcester, MA	W 49–13	
October 23	Westfield State^{†}	Swenson Field; Bridgewater, MA	W 47–14	
October 30	UMass Dartmouth	Swenson Field; Bridgewater, MA	L 20–26	
November 6	at Framingham State	Bowditch Field; Framingham, MA	L 13–47	
November 13	at Massachusetts Maritime	Clean Harbors Stadium; Buzzards Bay, MA	W 35–7	
*Non-conference game; ^{†}Homecoming

=== Plymouth State ===
2021 Plymouth State Panthers football
- Conference: Massachusetts State Collegiate Athletic Conference
- Record: 5–5 (5–3 MASCAC)
- Head coach: Paul Castonia (18th season); Devin Zeman (1st season)
- Defensive coordinator: Devin Zeman (13th season)
- Home stadium: Panther Field

The 2021 Plymouth State Panthers football team represented Plymouth State University as a member of the Massachusetts State Collegiate Athletic Conference (MASCAC) during the 2021 NCAA Division III football season. The Panthers, led by 18th-year head coach Paul Castonia, played their home games at Panther Field in Plymouth, New Hampshire.

Date	Opponent	Site	Result	Source
September 4	at Castleton*	Dave Wolk Stadium; Castleton, VT	L 0–13	
September 11	Husson*	Panther Field; Plymouth, NH	L 7–10	
September 18	at Bridgewater State	Swenson Field; Bridgewater, MA	L 24–27	
October 2	Framingham State	Plymouth State; Plymouth, NH	L 0–33	
October 9	at Western Connecticut	The WAC; Danbury, CT	W 16–13	
October 16	Fitchburg State	Panther Field; Plymouth, NH	W 36–0	
October 23	Worcester State	Panther Field; Plymouth, NH	W 42–14	
October 30	at Westfield State	Alumni Field; Westfield, MA	W 17–7	
November 6	Massachusetts Maritime	Panther Field; Plymouth, NH	W 27–7	
November 13	at UMass Dartmouth	Cressy Field; Dartmouth, MA	L 7–28	
*Non-conference game

=== Western Connecticut ===
2021 Western Connecticut Colonials football
- Conference: Massachusetts State Collegiate Athletic Conference
- Record: 5–5 (4–4 MASCAC)
- Head coach: Joe Loth (9th season)
- Home stadium: The WAC

The 2021 Western Connecticut Colonials football team represented Western Connecticut State University as a member of the Massachusetts State Collegiate Athletic Conference (MASCAC) during the 2021 NCAA Division III football season. The Colonials, led by 9th-year head coach Joe Loth, played their home games at the WAC in Danbury, Connecticut.

Date	Opponent	Site	Result	Source
September 4	William Paterson*	The WAC; Danbury, CT	W 24–21	
September 11	Albright*	The WAC; Danbury, CT	L 28–33	
September 17	Westfield State	The WAC; Danbury, CT	W 42–6	
September 24	at Bridgewater State	Swenson Field; Bridgewater, MA	L 17–21	
October 2	UMass Dartmouth	The WAC; Danbury, CT	W 34–19	
October 9	Plymouth State	The WAC; Danbury, CT	L 13–16	
October 16	at Framingham State	Bowditch Field; Framingham, MA	L 21–35	
October 23	Massachusetts Maritime	The WAC; Danbury, CT	L 20–22	
October 30	at Worcester State	John F. Coughlin Field; Worcester, MA	W 56–30	
November 13	at Fitchburg State	Elliot Field; Fitchburg, MA	W 48–13	
*Non-conference game

=== Massachusetts Maritime ===
2021 Massachusetts Maritime Buccaneers football
- Conference: Massachusetts State Collegiate Athletic Conference
- Record: 4–6 (3–5 MASCAC)
- Head coach: Jeremy Cameron (17th season)
- Home stadium: Clean Harbors Stadium

The 2021 Massachusetts Maritime Buccaneers football team represented Massachusetts Maritime Academy as a member of the Massachusetts State Collegiate Athletic Conference (MASCAC) during the 2021 NCAA Division III football season. The Buccaneers, led by 17th-year head coach Jeremy Cameron, played their home games at Clean Harbors Stadium in Buzzards Bay, Massachusetts.

Date	Opponent	Site	Result	Source
September 10	Maritime*	Clean Harbors Stadium; Buzzards Bay, MA	W 14–6	
September 18	at Anna Maria*	Caparso Field; Paxton, MA	L 13–23	
September 25	Fitchburg State	Clean Harbors Stadium; Buzzards Bay, MA	W 28–0	
October 2	at Westfield State	Alumni Field; Westfield, MA	W 16–8	
October 9	at UMass Dartmouth	Cressy Field; Dartmouth, MA	L 10–26	
October 16	Worcester State	Clean Harbors Stadium; Buzzards Bay, MA	L 24–28	
October 23	at Western Connecticut	The WAC; Danbury, CT	W 22–20	
October 30	Framingham State	Clean Harbors Stadium; Buzzards Bay, MA	L 14–23	
November 6	at Plymouth State	Panther Field; Plymouth, NY	L 7–27	
November 13	Bridgewater State	Clean Harbors Stadium; Buzzards Bay, MA	L 7–35	
*Non-conference game

=== Worcester State ===
2021 Worcester State Lancers football
- Conference: Massachusetts State Collegiate Athletic Conference
- Record: 3–7 (3–5 MASCAC)
- Head coach: Adam Peloquin (2nd season)
- Home stadium: John F. Coughlin Field

The 2021 Worcester State Lancers football team represented Worcester State University as a member of the Massachusetts State Collegiate Athletic Conference (MASCAC) during the 2021 NCAA Division III football season. The Lancers, led by 2nd-year head coach Adam Peloquin, played their home games at John F. Coughlin Field in Worcester, Massachusetts.

Date	Opponent	Site	Result	Source
September 3	at WPI*	Alumni Stadium; Worcester, MA	L 20–38	
September 11	Union*	John F. Coughlin Field; Worcester, MA	L 13–62	
September 18	Fitchburg State	John F. Coughlin Field; Worcester, MA	W 38–35	
September 25	at UMass Dartmouth	Cressy Field; Dartmouth, MA	L 7–52	
October 9	Bridgewater State	John F. Coughlin Field; Worcester, MA	L 13–49	
October 16	at Massachusetts Maritime	Clean Harbors Stadium; Buzzards Bay, MA	W 28–24	
October 23	at Plymouth State	Panther Field; Plymouth, NH	L 14–42	
October 30	Western Connecticut	John F. Coughlin Field; Worcester, MA	L 30–56	
November 6	at Westfield State	Alumni Field; Westfield, MA	W 33–30	
November 13	Framingham State	John F. Coughlin Field; Worcester, MA	L 21–40	
*Non-conference game

=== Westfield State ===
2021 Westfield State Owls football
- Conference: Massachusetts State Collegiate Athletic Conference
- Record: 1–9 (1–7 MASCAC)
- Head coach: Pete Kowalski (8th season)
- Home stadium: Alumni Field

The 2021 Westfield State Owls football team represented Westfield State University as a member of the Massachusetts State Collegiate Athletic Conference (MASCAC) during the 2021 NCAA Division III football season. The Owls, led by 8th-year head coach Pete Kowalski, played their home games at Alumni Field in Westfield, Massachusetts.

Date	Opponent	Site	Result	Source
September 3	at Nichols*	Vendetti Field; Dudley, MA	L 6–21	
September 10	Western New England*	Alumni Field; Springfield, MA	L 0–48	
September 17	at Western Connecticut	The WAC; Danbury, CT	L 6–42	
September 25	at Framingham State	Bowditch Field; Framingham, MA	L 6–41	
October 2	Massachusetts Maritime	Alumni Field; Springfield, MA	L 8–16	
October 16	UMass Dartmouth	Alumni Field; Springfield, MA	L 16–26	
October 23	at Bridgewater State	Swenson Field; Bridgewater, MA	L 14–47	
October 30	Plymouth State	Alumni Field; Springfield, MA	L 7–17	
November 6	Worcester State	Alumni Field; Springfield, MA	L 30–33	
November 13	at Fitchburg State	Elliot Field; Fitchburg, MA	W 38–20	
*Non-conference game

=== Fitchburg State ===
2021 Fitchburg State Falcons football
- Conference: Massachusetts State Collegiate Athletic Conference
- Record: 0–10 (0–8 MASCAC)
- Head coach: Scott Sperone (1st season)
- Home stadium: Elliot Field

The 2021 Fitchburg State Falcons football team represented Fitchburg State University as a member of the Massachusetts State Collegiate Athletic Conference (MASCAC) during the 2021 NCAA Division III football season. The Falcons, led by 1st-year head coach Scott Sperone, played their home games at Elliot Field in Fitchburg, Massachusetts.

Date	Opponent	Site	Result	Source
September 4	at Dean*	Dale Lippert Field; Franklin, MA	L 6–42	
September 11	Castleton*	Elliot Field; Fitchburg, MA	L 0–35	
September 18	at Worcester State	John T. Coughlin Field; Worcester, MA	L 35–38	
September 25	at Massachusetts Maritime	Clean Harbors Stadium; Buzzards Bay, MA	L 0–28	
October 2	Bridgewater State	Elliot Field; Fitchburg, MA	L 16–26	
October 9	Framingham State	Elliot Field; Fitchburg, MA	L 0–35	
October 16	at Plymouth State	Panther Field; Plymouth, NH	L 0–36	
October 23	at UMass Dartmouth	Cressy Field; Dartmouth, MA	L 0–40	
November 6	Western Connecticut	Elliot Field; Fitchburg, MA	L 13–48	
November 13	Westfield State	Elliot Field; Fitchburg, MA	L 20–38	
*Non-conference game

== All-conference team ==
Offensive Player of the Year – Devaun Ford, Framingham State, running back

Defensive Player of the Year – Joshua Onujiogu, Framingham State, defensive end

Offensive Lineman of the Year – Bryan Lawton, Framingham State, guard

Offensive Rookie of the Year – Dante Aviles-Santos, UMass Dartmouth, quarterback

Defensive Rookie of the Year – Dylan DeWolfe, Framingham State, linebacker

Coach of the Year – Tom Kelley, Framingham State
