= Mid-Atlantic District =

Mid-Atlantic District is a regional designation used by many organizations and may refer to any of the following:

- Mid-Atlantic District (BHS), one of the districts of the Barbershop Harmony Society
- Mid-Atlantic District (Church of the Brethren)

== See also ==
- Mid-Atlantic (disambiguation)
