= Michael Strachan (American football coach) =

American football player and coach (born 1968)

Current position
- Title: Head coach
- Team: North Attleborough HS (MA)
- Record: 8–3

Biographical details
- Born: c. 1968 (age 57–58); Attleboro, Massachusetts, U.S.

Playing career
- 1987–1989: Stonehill
- 1990–1991: Stockholm Mean Machines
- Position: Quarterback

Coaching career (HC unless noted)
- 1990–1992: Stockholm Mean Machines
- 1993: Sweden national American football team
- 1992–1994: Framingham State (DC)
- 1994: Framingham State (interim HC/DC)
- 1995–2001: Framingham State
- 2013–2021: Attleboro HS (MA)
- 2022–present: North Attleborough HS (MA)

Head coaching record
- Overall: 15–59–1 (college); 57–60 (high school)

Michael Strachan (born c. 1968) is an American football coach. He is currently the head coach for North Attleborough High School. He was previously the head coach for the Stockholm Mean Machines from 1990 to 1992, the Sweden national American football team in 1993, Framingham State from 1994 to 2001, and Attleboro High School from 2013 to 2021. He played college football for Stonehill and professionally for the Stockholm Mean Machines as a quarterback.

== Head coaching record ==
=== College ===
Year	Team	Overall	Conference	Standing	Bowl/playoffs
Framingham State Rams (New England Football Conference) (1994–2001)
1994	Framingham State	1–6–1 (Note: Strach replaced Tom Raeke after he resigned following the first game of the season.)	1–6	8th	
1995	Framingham State	2–7	2–6	7th	
1996	Framingham State	1–8	1–7	8th	
1997	Framingham State	2–8	1–7	T–8th	
1998	Framingham State	2–8	0–6	7th (Red)	
1999	Framingham State	2–8	0–6	7th (Red)	
2000	Framingham State	3–7	2–4	T–5th (Bogan)	
2001	Framingham State	2–7	2–4	T–4th (Bogan)	
Framingham State:		15–59–1	9–45–0		
Total:		15–59–1			

=== High school ===
Year	Team	Overall	Conference	Standing	Bowl/playoffs
Attleboro Bombardiers () (2013–2022)
2013	Attleboro	9–2	5–1	2nd	
2014	Attleboro	4–7	2–3	4th	
2015	Attleboro	7–5	4–2	2nd	
2016	Attleboro	4–7	2–3	4th	
2017	Attleboro	6–7	3–2	3rd	
2018	Attleboro	4–6	2–3	4th	
2019	Attleboro	6–5	2–3	4th	
2020	Attleboro	0–6	0–4	6th	
2021	Attleboro	4–6	1–4	5th	
Attleboro:		44–51	21–25		
North Attleborough Rocketeers () (2022–present)
2022	North Attleborough	8–3	3–2	3rd	
2023	North Attleborough	5–6	1–4	5th	
North Attleborough:		13–9	4–6		
Total:		57–60			
