= Tom Kelley (American football) =

American football coach and administrator

Current position
- Title: Athletic director & head coach
- Team: Framingham State
- Conference: MASCAC
- Record: 134–83–1

Biographical details
- Born: Framingham, Massachusetts, U.S.
- Education: Framingham State University

Playing career
- 1972–1975: Framingham State
- Position: Defensive tackle

Coaching career (HC unless noted)
- 1978–1981: Framingham State (assistant)
- 1982–1984: Framingham State
- 2001: Framingham State (assistant)
- 2007–2019: Framingham State
- 2021–present: Framingham State

Administrative career (AD unless noted)
- 1994–present: Framingham State

Head coaching record
- Overall: 134–83–1
- Bowls: 4–0
- Tournaments: 0–7 (NCAA D-III playoffs)

Accomplishments and honors

Championships
- 8 MASCAC (2013–2015, 2017–2019, 2021, 2025); 3 NEFC Bogan Division (2010–2012)

Thomas Kelley is an American college football coach and athletic director. He is the head football coach and athletic director for Framingham State University, holding the position of head football coach since 2021 and athletic director since 1994. Kelley is currently in his third stint as the head football coach with his first two being from 1982 to 1984 and 2007 to 2019.

== Head coaching record ==
Year	Team	Overall	Conference	Standing	Bowl/playoffs
Framingham State Rams (New England Football Conference) (1982–1984)
1982	Framingham State	3–6	3–6	7th	
1983	Framingham State	2–7	2–7	T–7th	
1984	Framingham State	1–7–1	1–7–1	10th	
Framingham State Rams (New England Football Conference) (2007–2012)
2007	Framingham State	2–7	1–6	T–7th (Bogan)	
2008	Framingham State	5–5	3–4	T–5th (Bogan)	
2009	Framingham State	5–5	3–4	5th (Bogan)	
2010	Framingham State	9–2	7–1	1st (Bogan)	W Northeast
2011	Framingham State	7–4	6–2	T–1st (Bogan)	
2012	Framingham State	10–2	8–0	1st (Bogan)	L NCAA Division III First Round
Framingham State Rams (Massachusetts State Collegiate Athletic Conference) (2013–2019)
2013	Framingham State	9–2	8–0	1st	L NCAA Division III First Round
2014	Framingham State	10–1	8–0	1st	W North Atlantic
2015	Framingham State	9–2	8–0	1st	L NCAA Division III First Round
2016	Framingham State	8–3	6–2	2nd	W New England
2017	Framingham State	10–1	7–1	T–1st	W New England
2018	Framingham State	8–3	7–1	1st	L NCAA Division III First Round
2019	Framingham State	8–3	8–0	1st	L NCAA Division III First Round
Framingham State Rams (Massachusetts State Collegiate Athletic Conference) (2021–present)
2021	Framingham State	8–3	8–0	1st	L NCAA Division III First Round
2022	Framingham State	5–5	4–4	5th	
2023	Framingham State	5–4	5–3	4th	
2024	Framingham State	3–7	3–6	T–7th	
2025	Framingham State	7–4	7–2	T–1st	L NCAA Division III First Round
2026	Framingham State	0–0	0–0		
Framingham State:		134–83–1	113–57–1		
Total:		134–83–1			
National championship Conference title Conference division title or championship game berth
