= Tom Raeke =

American football coach

Biographical details
- Born: c. 1949
- Died: July 5, 2007
- Education: Southern Connecticut St

Coaching career (HC unless noted)
- 1983–1984: Framingham State (assistant)
- 1985–1994: Framingham State

Head coaching record
- Overall: 31–50

Thomas Raeke Jr. (c. 1949 – July 5, 2007) was an American football coach. He was the head football coach at Framingham State University, a position he held from 1985 to 1994.

Raeke was an assistant on the staff of head coach Tom Kelley for two seasons before being promoted to head coach at Framingham State. At the time of his death, his 1986 squad, which finished with a record of 6 wins and 4 losses, was the last winning season at Framingham. They did not have another season above .500 until 2010.

== Head coaching record ==
| Year | Team | Overall | Conference | Standing | Bowl/playoffs |
|---|---|---|---|---|---|
Framingham State Rams (New England Football Conference) (1985–1994)
| 1985 | Framingham State | 3–6 | 3–6 | 8th | |
| 1986 | Framingham State | 6–4 | 6–3 | 4th | |
| 1987 | Framingham State | 2–6 | 1–4 | 5th (South) | |
| 1988 | Framingham State | 2–7 | 2–4 | 6th (South) | |
| 199 | Framingham State | 4–5 | 3–3 | T–2nd (South) | |
| 1990 | Framingham State | 4–5 | 3–3 | 3rd (South) | |
| 1991 | Framingham State | 2–6 | 1–5 | T–6th (South) | |
| 1992 | Framingham State | 4–5 | 3–5 | 7th | |
| 1993 | Framingham State | 4–5 | 3–5 | T–6th | |
| 1994 | Framingham State | 0–1 (Note: Raeke resigned after the first game of the 1994 season. Michael Strachan replaced him as head coach for the remainder of the season. Framingham State finished the year 1–7–1 overall and 1–7 in New England Football Conference play, placing eighth.) | 0–1 | | |
| Framingham State: | | 31–50 | 25–39 | | |
| Total: | | 31–50 | | | |
