= Framingham State Rams football =

College football team

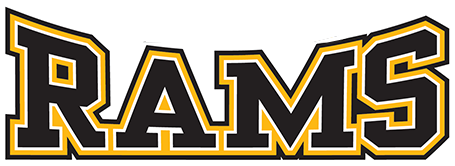
- First season: 1972; 54 years ago
- Athletic director: Tom Kelley
- Head coach: Tom Kelley; 21st season, 134–83–1 (.617)
- Location: Framingham, Massachusetts
- Stadium: Bowditch Field (capacity: 5,130)
- NCAA division: Division III
- Conference: MASCAC
- Colors: Gold and black
- All-time record: 220–251–2 (.467)
- Bowl record: 4–0 (1.000)

Conference championships
- 8

Division championships
- 3
- Rivalries: Western Connecticut
- Mascot: Ram
- Website: fsurams.com/football

The Framingham State Rams football team represents Framingham State University in college football at the NCAA Division III level. The Rams are members of the Massachusetts State Collegiate Athletic Conference, having joined in 2013. The Rams play their home games at Bowditch Field in Framingham, Massachusetts.

Their head coach is Tom Kelley, who took over the position for the 2007 season.

== Conference affiliations ==
- Club team (1972–1973)
- New England Football Conference (1974–2012)
- Massachusetts State Collegiate Athletic Conference (2013–present)

== Championships ==
=== Conference championships ===
Framingham State claims 8 conference titles, the most recent of which came in 2021.

Year	Conference	Overall Record	Conference Record	Coach
2012	New England Football Conference	10–2	8–0	Tom Kelley
2013	Massachusetts State Collegiate Athletic Conference	9–2	8–0	Tom Kelley
2014	Massachusetts State Collegiate Athletic Conference	10–1	8–0	Tom Kelley
2015	Massachusetts State Collegiate Athletic Conference	9–2	8–0	Tom Kelley
2017†	Massachusetts State Collegiate Athletic Conference	10–1	7–1	Tom Kelley
2018	Massachusetts State Collegiate Athletic Conference	8–3	7–1	Tom Kelley
2019	Massachusetts State Collegiate Athletic Conference	8–3	8–0	Tom Kelley
2021	Massachusetts State Collegiate Athletic Conference	8–3	8–0	Tom Kelley

† Co-champions

=== Division championships ===
Bridgewater State claims 7 division titles, the most recent of which came in 2008.

Year	Division	Coach	Overall Record	Conference Record	Opponent	CG result
2010	NEFC Bogan	Tom Kelley	9–2	7–1	N/A lost tiebreaker to Maine Maritime	
2011†	NEFC Bogan	Tom Kelley	7–4	6–2	Western New England	L 13–20
2012	NEFC Bogan	Tom Kelley	10–2	8–0	Salve Regina	W 28–16

† Co-champions

== Postseason games ==
=== NCAA Division III playoff games ===
Framingham State have made in seven appearances in the NCAA Division III playoffs, with an overall record of 0–7.

Year	Round	Opponent	Result
2012	First Round	Cortland	L, 19–20
2013	First Round	Ithaca	L, 0–25
2015	First Round	Wesley	L, 22–42
2018	First Round	Brockport	L, 27–40
2019	First Round	Wesley	L, 21–58
2021	First Round	Muhlenberg	L, 0–45
2025	First Round	LaGrange	L, 21–24

=== Bowl games ===
Framingham State has participated in four bowl games, and has a record of 4–0.

Season	Coach	Bowl	Opponent	Result
2010	Tom Kelley	ECAC Bowl	Norwich	W 27–21
2014	Tom Kelley	ECAC Bowl	RPI	W 42–36
2016	Tom Kelley	New England Bowl	Salve Regina	W 37–34
2017	Tom Kelley	New England Bowl	Curry	W 48–14

== List of head coaches ==
=== Key ===
Key to symbols in coaches list
General		Overall		Conference		Postseason (Note: Although the first Rose Bowl Game was played in 1902, it has been continuously played since the 1916 game, and is recognized as the oldest bowl game by the NCAA. "—" indicates any season prior to 1916 when postseason games were not played.)	
No.	Order of coaches (Note: A running total of the number of head coaches, with coaches who served separate tenures being counted only once. Interim head coaches are represented with "Int" and are not counted in the running total. "—" indicates the team played but either without a coach or no coach is on record. "X" indicates an interim year without play.)	GC	Games coached	CW	Conference wins	PW	Postseason wins
DC	Division championships	OW	Overall wins	CL	Conference losses	PL	Postseason losses
CC	Conference championships	OL	Overall losses	CT	Conference ties	PT	Postseason ties
NC	National championships	OT	Overall ties (Note: Overtime rules in college football were introduced in 1996, making ties impossible in the period since.)	C%	Conference winning percentage		
†	Elected to the College Football Hall of Fame	O%	Overall winning percentage (Note: When computing the win–loss percentage, a tie counts as half a win and half a loss.)				

=== Coaches ===
List of head football coaches showing season(s) coached, overall records, conference records, postseason records, championships and selected awards
No.	Name	Season(s)	GC	OW	OL	OT	O%	CW	CL	CT	C%	PW	PL	PT	DC	CC	NC	Awards
1	Dennis Golden	1972–1981	82	47	35	0	0.573	–	–	–	–	–	–	–	–	–	–	–
2	Tom Kelley	1982–1984, 2007–2019, 2021–present	178	115	62	1	0.649	–	–	–	–	–	–	–	–	–	–	–
3	Tom Raeke	1985–1994	81	31	50	0	0.383	–	–	–	–	–	–	–	–	–	–	–
4	Michael Strachan	1995–2001	75	15	58	1	0.220	9	45	0	–	–	–	–	–	–	–	–
5	Mark Sullivan	2002–2006	45	4	41	0	0.089	–	–	–	–	–	–	–	–	–	–	–
6	Aynsley Rosenbaum	2020	0	0	0	0	–	–	–	–	–	–	–	–	–	–	–	–

== Year-by-year results ==
National champions	Conference champions	Bowl game berth	Playoff berth

Season	Year	Head Coach	Association	Division	Conference	Record							Postseason	Final ranking
Season	Year	Head Coach	Association	Division	Conference	Overall			Conference				Postseason	Final ranking
Season	Year	Head Coach	Association	Division	Conference	Win	Loss	Tie	Finish	Win	Loss	Tie	Postseason	Final ranking
Framingham State Rams
1972	1972	Dennis Golden	Club team	–	–	5	0	0					—	—
1973	1973	Dennis Golden	Club team	–	–	4	3	0					—	—
1974	1974	Dennis Golden	NCAA	Division III	NEFC	5	3	0	T–5th	4	3	0	—	—
1975	1975	Dennis Golden	NCAA	Division III	NEFC	6	2	0	3rd	5	2	0	—	—
1976	1976	Dennis Golden	NCAA	Division III	NEFC	5	4	0	T–5th	4	4	0	—	—
1977	1977	Dennis Golden	NCAA	Division III	NEFC	3	6	0	8th	2	6	0	—	—
1978	1978	Dennis Golden	NCAA	Division III	NEFC	5	4	0	6th	4	4	0	—	—
1979	1979	Dennis Golden	NCAA	Division III	NEFC	6	3	0	T–2nd	6	3	0	—	—
1980	1980	Dennis Golden	NCAA	Division III	NEFC	4	5	0	7th	4	5	0	—	—
1981	1981	Dennis Golden	NCAA	Division III	NEFC	4	5	0	6th	4	5	0	—	—
1982	1982	Tom Kelley	NCAA	Division III	NEFC	3	6	0	7th	3	6	0	—	—
1983	1983	Tom Kelley	NCAA	Division III	NEFC	3	6	0	T–7th	3	6	0	—	—
1984	1984	Tom Kelley	NCAA	Division III	NEFC	1	7	1	10th	1	7	1	—	—
1985	1985	Tom Raeke	NCAA	Division III	NEFC	3	6	0	8th	3	6	0	—	—
1986	1986	Tom Raeke	NCAA	Division III	NEFC	6	4	0	4th	6	3	0	—	—
1987	1987	Tom Raeke	NCAA	Division III	NEFC	2	6	0	5th (South)	1	4	0	—	—
1988	1988	Tom Raeke	NCAA	Division III	NEFC	2	7	0	6th (South)	2	4	0	—	—
1989	1989	Tom Raeke	NCAA	Division III	NEFC	4	5	0	T–2nd (South)	3	3	0	—	—
1990	1990	Tom Raeke	NCAA	Division III	NEFC	4	5	0	3rd (South)	3	3	0	—	—
1991	1991	Tom Raeke	NCAA	Division III	NEFC	2	6	0	T–6th (South)	1	5	0	—	—
1992	1992	Tom Raeke	NCAA	Division III	NEFC	4	5	0	7th	3	5	0	—	—
1993	1993	Tom Raeke	NCAA	Division III	NEFC	4	5	0	T–6th	3	5	0	—	—
1994	1994	Tom Raeke (week 1) / Michael Strachan (weeks 2–10)	NCAA	Division III	NEFC	1	7	1	8th	1	6	0	—	—
1995	1995	Michael Strachan	NCAA	Division III	NEFC	2	7	0	7th	2	6	0	—	—
1996	1996	Michael Strachan	NCAA	Division III	NEFC	1	8	0	8th	1	7	0	—	—
1997	1997	Michael Strachan	NCAA	Division III	NEFC	2	8	0	T–8th	1	7	0	—	—
1998	1998	Michael Strachan	NCAA	Division III	NEFC	2	8	0	7th (Red)	0	6	0	—	—
1999	1999	Michael Strachan	NCAA	Division III	NEFC	2	8	0	7th (Red)	0	6	0	—	—
2000	2000	Michael Strachan	NCAA	Division III	NEFC	3	7	0	T–5th (Bogan)	2	4	0	—	—
2001	2001	Michael Strachan	NCAA	Division III	NEFC	2	7	0	T–4th (Bogan)	2	4	0	—	—
2002	2002	Mark Sullivan	NCAA	Division III	NEFC	1	8	0	T–5th (Bogan)	1	5	0	—	—
2003	2003	Mark Sullivan	NCAA	Division III	NEFC	0	9	0	8th (Bogan)	0	6	0	—	—
2004	2004	Mark Sullivan	NCAA	Division III	NEFC	0	9	0	7th (Bogan)	0	6	0	—	—
2005	2005	Mark Sullivan	NCAA	Division III	NEFC	2	7	0	6th (Bogan)	1	5	0	—	—
2006	2006	Mark Sullivan	NCAA	Division III	NEFC	1	8	0	T–7th (Bogan)	1	6	0	—	—
2007	2007	Tom Kelley	NCAA	Division III	NEFC	2	7	0	T–7th (Bogan)	1	6	0	—	—
2008	2008	Tom Kelley	NCAA	Division III	NEFC	5	5	0	T–5th (Bogan)	3	4	0	—	—
2009	2009	Tom Kelley	NCAA	Division III	NEFC	5	5	0	5th (Bogan)	3	4	0	—	—
2010	2010	Tom Kelley	NCAA	Division III	NEFC	9	2	0	1st (Bogan)	7	1	0	W ECAC Northeast Bowl	—
2011	2011	Tom Kelley	NCAA	Division III	NEFC	7	4	0	T–1st (Bogan)	6	2	0	Conference champions	—
2012	2012	Tom Kelley	NCAA	Division III	NEFC	10	2	0	1st (Bogan)	8	0	0	L NCAA Division III First Round	—
2013	2013	Tom Kelley	NCAA	Division III	MASCAC	9	2	0	1st	8	0	0	L NCAA Division III First Round	—
2014	2014	Tom Kelley	NCAA	Division III	MASCAC	10	1	0	1st	8	0	0	W ECAC North Atlantic Bowl	—
2015	2015	Tom Kelley	NCAA	Division III	MASCAC	9	2	0	1st	8	0	0	L NCAA Division III First Round	—
2016	2016	Tom Kelley	NCAA	Division III	MASCAC	8	3	0	2nd	6	2	0	W New England Bowl	—
2017	2017	Tom Kelley	NCAA	Division III	MASCAC	10	1	0	T–1st	7	1	0	W New England Bowl	—
2018	2018	Tom Kelley	NCAA	Division III	MASCAC	8	3	0	1st	7	1	0	L NCAA Division III First Round	—
2019	2019	Tom Kelley	NCAA	Division III	MASCAC	8	3	0	1st	8	0	0	L NCAA Division III First Round	—
Season canceled due to COVID-19
2021	2021	Tom Kelley	NCAA	Division III	MASCAC	8	3	0	1st	8	0	0	L NCAA Division III First Round	—
2022	2022	Tom Kelley	NCAA	Division III	MASCAC	5	5	0	5th	4	4	0	—	—
2023	2023	Tom Kelley	NCAA	Division III	MASCAC								—	—

== Rivalries ==
=== Worcester State ===
The traditional final game of the season and plays for the Route 9 Cup (the only state route that links Framingham directly with Worcester). Worcester State leads the series with twenty wins to seventeen as of the end of the 2022 season.

=== Massachusetts Maritime ===
Plays for the Kelley Bowl due to both coaches being a part of the Kelley family.

== Notable former players ==
- Joshua Onujiogu – Seattle Seahawks

== See also ==
- Framingham State Rams
