= Dennis Golden =

American football coach

Biographical details
- Born: Queens, New York, U.S.
- Education: Holy Cross (B.S. 1963); Assumption (M.A. 1969); Boston College (Ed.D. 1974)

Playing career
- 1959–1962: Holy Cross
- Position: Tackle

Coaching career (HC unless noted)
- 1972–1981: Framingham State

Administrative career (AD unless noted)
- 1995–2014: Fontbonne University (President)

Head coaching record
- Overall: 38–32 (varsity); 9–3 (club)

Accomplishments and honors

Awards
- 2× All-New England (1961, 1962); 2× All-East (1961, 1962); Holy Cross Sanctae Cruces Award (2014)

Dennis C. Golden is an American former football coach for Framingham State University and a college president for Fontbonne University. He played college football at the College of the Holy Cross.

== Early life ==
Golden was born in Bayside, Queens. He attended Holy Cross High School and graduated in its inaugural class. He practiced football and basketball.

== Football playing career ==
Golden was a two–way starter at tackle for the Holy Cross Crusaders football team, where he was a team co–captain in 1962 under head coach Eddie Anderson.

Golden was drafted by the Dallas Cowboys in the 16th round (216th overall) of the 1963 NFL draft. He instead chose to enlist in the United States Marines and pursue a career in education. He was a part of the Quantico 1963 Armed Forces Championship football team.

In 1966, he signed a contract with the Boston Patriots of the American Football League, but was waived on August 30.

In 1974, he was inducted into the Holy Cross Varsity Club Hall of Fame. In 2014, he received the Holy Cross Receives Sanctae Crucis Award.

== Football coaching career ==
Golden was the head football coach at Framingham State University, a position he held from 1972 to 1981, finishing with record of 47 wins and 36 losses.

== Educational leadership ==
He was a dean of students and a vice president for student affairs at three different universities (Framingham State, Duquesne and Louisville). He also served as president of the National Association of Student Personnel Administrators and chairman of the board of the Association of Catholic Colleges and Universities.

From 1995 to 2014, Golden was the president of Fontbonne University in Clayton, Missouri. During his tenure, Golden oversaw $32 million in capital improvements on the school's campus.

== Head coaching record ==
=== Club ===
Year	Team	Overall	Conference	Standing	Bowl/playoffs
Framingham State Rams (Independent) (1972–1973)
1972	Framingham State	5–0			
1973	Framingham State	4–3			
Framingham State:		9–3			
Total:		9–3			

=== Varsity ===
Year	Team	Overall	Conference	Standing	Bowl/playoffs
Framingham State Rams (New England Football Conference) (1974–1975)
1974	Framingham State	5–3	4–3	T–5th	
1975	Framingham State	6–2	5–2	3rd	
1976	Framingham State	5–4	4–4	T–5th	
1977	Framingham State	3–6	2–6	8th	
1978	Framingham State	5–4	4–4	6th	
1979	Framingham State	6–3	6–3	T–2nd	
1980	Framingham State	4–5	4–5	7th	
1981	Framingham State	4–5	4–5	6th	
Framingham State:		38–32	33–32		
Total:		38–32			
