= Framingham State Rams =

- University: Framingham State University
- Nickname: Rams
- NCAA: Division III
- Conferences: Massachusetts State Collegiate Athletic Conference (MASCAC)
- President: Dr. Nancy Niemi
- Athletic director: Thomas Kelley
- Location: Framingham, Massachusetts
- First year: 1968
- Varsity teams: 15 (6 men's, 9 women's)
- Football stadium: Bowditch Field
- Basketball arena: Logan Gymnasium
- Ice hockey arena: Loring Arena
- Baseball stadium: Bowditch Field; New England Baseball Complex (early season games)
- Softball stadium: Maple Street Field
- Soccer stadium: Maple Street Field
- Lacrosse stadium: Maple Street Field
- Volleyball arena: Logan Gymnasium
- Colors: FSU Gold and FSU Black
- Mascot: Sam the Ram
- Website: www.fsurams.com/landing/index
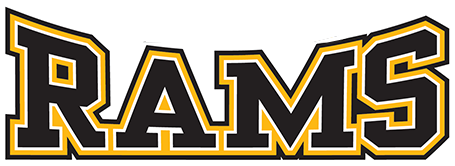

The Framingham State Rams are composed of 14 (15 in 2024–25) varsity teams (6 men's, 9 women's) representing Framingham State University in intercollegiate athletics. All teams compete at the NCAA Division III level and all teams compete in the Massachusetts State Collegiate Athletic Conference (MASCAC).

== Background ==
Men's programs include baseball, cross country, football, basketball, ice hockey, and soccer. Women's programs include cross country, lacrosse, softball, basketball, field hockey, outdoor track and field, soccer, and volleyball (women's ice hockey will be added in 2024–25). Club sports that the university offers include Cheerleading, Men's Lacrosse, Men's Rugby, and Women's Rugby. The university also offers a wide variety of intramural programs that include everything from badminton, to golf, to dodgeball. There is also a state-of-the-art athletic and recreation center which opened in 2001 that includes basketball courts, a volleyball court, and a weight room.

== Nickname ==
Framingham State University adopted its mascot the ram in 1967, after a school-wide vote on what should represent the school. It came at the same time as the school, which had been all female up until 1964, added its first male athletics team. In one of the logos it shows a ram running down a hill, which represents the 282 foot (86 meter) high Bare Hill, where Framingham State University sits atop. The mascot's name is Sam the Ram.

== Sports sponsored ==
Men's sports	Women's sports
Baseball	Basketball
Basketball	Cross Country
Cross Country	Field Hockey
Football	Ice Hockey
Ice Hockey	Lacrosse
Soccer	Soccer
	Softball
	Track & Field
	Volleyball
† – Track and field is outdoors only

=== Club Sports ===
- Men's Lacrosse
- Women's Rugby (on hiatus)
- Men's Rugby (on hiatus)
- Coed Cheerleading

=== Baseball ===
The Framingham State Rams Baseball team began play in 1969 and has an overall record of 725-830-3 (.466) as of the end of the 2023 season, and 246-312 (.441) in MASCAC conference play from 1986 to the end of the 2022 season. The team's home field is Bowditch Field in Framingham, Massachusetts, however most early season home games (until usually April 1) are played at the New England Baseball Complex (NEBC) in Northborough, Massachusetts.

On May 6, 2023, The Framingham State Rams baseball team led by fifth year head coach Sean Callahan won their first ever MASCAC regular season title with winning two out of three games in a series over Fitchburg State. Meanwhile Bridgewater State lost three out of three games in a series against Westfield State to give Framingham State their first ever MASCAC regular season title.

Accomplishments

- 2x Massachusetts State Collegiate Athletic Conference (MASCAC) Regular Season Champions – 2023 (2-way with Bridgewater State), 2024 (3-way with Bridgewater State and Salem State)
- 2x MASCAC Tournament Runner Up – 2017, 2018
- 3x Eastern College Athletic Conference (ECAC) Division III New England Baseball Tournament Runner Up – 1993, 1997, 2015

=== Men's basketball ===
The Framingham State men's basketball team began play in the 1967–68 season as the first varsity team at Framingham State, and has an overall record of 560-804 (.411), 239-364 (.396) in MASCAC conference play as of the end of the 2022–23 season. The teams home court is the Logan Gymnasium in Framingham, Massachusetts.

In 1984 Mark VanValkenburg was selected as a member of the first team of the National Association of Basketball Coaches (NABC) Division III All America selections.

On November 28, 2022, the Framingham State Rams (2-5 overall, 0–0 in MASCAC play) took on the Bryant University Bulldogs of NCAA Division I's America East Conference (6-1 overall, 0–0 in America East play) in a non-conference exhibition game at the Chace Athletic Center in Smithfield, Rhode Island. Although the Rams lost by a final score of 98–44, the game was notable due to freshman guard Julius Goines's dunk in the beginning minutes of the second half. The dunk was so notable that it was featured on ESPN's SportsCenter top 10 plays as the number 4 play the following day on November 29, 2022.

Accomplishments

- 3x MASCAC Regular Season Champions – 1978–79, 1979–80 (2-way with Salem State), 1983–84
- 3x MASCAC Tournament Runner Up – 2000–01, 2001–02, 2004–05
- 3x NCAA Division III men's basketball tournament Qualifier – 1978–79, 1979–80, 1983–84
- 1x NCAA Division III men's basketball tournament Regional Second Place Team – 1978–79

=== Women's basketball ===
The Framingham State women's basketball team began play in the 1974–75 season as the first women's varsity team at Framingham State, and has an overall record of 467-649 (.418), 187-319 (.370) in MASCAC conference play as of the end of the 2022–23 season. The teams home court is the Logan Gymnasium in Framingham, Massachusetts.

With the hiring of head coach Walter Paschal in the 2013–14 season from the Fitchburg State Falcons, the Framingham State Rams women's basketball team has seen a lot of success in recent years. In Walter's first year (2013–14), the Rams won a share of the MASCAC regular season title (along with Bridgewater State and Westfield State), to make it the Rams first conference title in program history. However the Rams lost in the MASCAC tournament finals to the Bridgewater State Bears by a final score of 73–66. The Rams did go on a run to the Eastern College Athletic Conference (ECAC) DIII New England Semifinals losing to the Endicott College Gulls by a final score of 67–64. However, in the next five years the Rams have made it to either the MASCAC tournament semifinals (2014–15 and 2018–19) or the MASCAC tournament finals (2015–16, 2016–17, and 2017–18) without winning the MASCAC regular season crown.

Finally in the 2019–2020 season the Rams won their first ever outright MASCAC regular season championship with an overall record of 22-6 (.786) and a perfect 12-0 (1.000) in MASCAC conference play. They went on to become MASCAC tournament champions for the first time ever beating the Worcester State Lancers at home by a final score of 66-51 led by MASCAC tournament MVP senior guard Mary Kate O'Day and with a posted attendance of 1,214 people, which represented the biggest home crowd in program history and Logan Gymnasium history. With that win the Rams were awarded with an automatic berth into the 2020 NCAA Division III women's basketball tournament which was the first time in program history that the Rams appeared in the NCAA Division III women's basketball tournament. On March 6, 2020, the Rams were matched up with the D3hoops.com number 7 team, the Amherst College Mammoths at the LeFrak Gymnasium in Amherst, Massachusetts on the campus of Amherst College in which the game ended with a final score of 70-46 and a posted attendance of 12 people.

In the 2021–22 season (no 2020–21 season due to COVID-19 concerns) the Rams recorded their best ever record with an overall record of 22-4 (.846) and a perfect 12-0 (1.000) in MASCAC conference play. The Rams won their third ever (second ever outright) MASCAC regular season title and won their second ever MASCAC tournament title with a 84–69 win over the Bridgewater State Bears at home with a posted attendance of 844 people led by MASCAC tournament MVP sophomore guard Gwendolyn Carpenter. The Rams were again awarded an automatic berth to the NCAA tournament, this time being matched up with the D3hoops.com number 16 team, the Smith College Pioneers at Ainsworth Gymnasium on the campus of Smith College in Northampton, Massachusetts. On March 4, 2022, Smith beat Framingham State by a final score of 61–51 with a posted attendance of 450 people, which marked the closest NCAA tournament game in program history to date.

On December 3, 2022, the Framingham State women's basketball team upset the Smith Pioneers at home by a final score of 78-74 who was ranked number 6 on the D3hoops.com women's basketball top 25 national poll. This game was notable due to multiple factors. First this was the programs first ever win against a top 25 opponent. Second this game was a rematch of the 2022 NCAA Division III women's basketball tournament first round. Lastly junior center, Flannery O'Connor scored her 1,000th point making her the 14th Ram in program history to score 1,000 points. On December 11, 2022, the Rams appeared in the D3hoops.com women's basketball poll for the first time ever receiving 2 votes in the D3hoops.com women's Top 25, 2022-23 Week 3 poll. Although for the Rams, the 2022–23 season not the best of seasons for the team compared to the prior two seasons. The Rams entered the 2023 MASCAC conference play with a 25-game winning streak against MASCAC opponents dating back to February 21, 2019, however that was snapped when on January 4, 2023, the Bridgewater State Bears (8-4 overall, 0–0 in MASCAC play) beat the Rams (8-2 overall, 0–0 in MASCAC play), 75–58 at home. The Rams finished the 2022–23 season with an overall record of 17-6 (.739) and 9-3 (.750) in MASCAC conference play culminating with a 90–76 loss to the third seeded Westfield State Owls at home in the MASCAC tournament semifinals.

During the 2023–24 season, the Rams appeared in the 13th annual D3hoops.com Classic at South Point Arena in Las Vegas, Nevada for the first time in program and school history. The Rams opened the tournament with a 71–48 win over the Westminster College (Missouri) Blue Jays on December 27, 2023, and later fell to the nationally ranked Trinity University (Texas) Tigers, 83–74, on December 29, 2023. All games of the classic were streamed live on Team1Sports via a link provided by D3hoops.com.

Accomplishments

- 4x MASCAC Regular Season Champions – 2013–14 (3-way with Bridgewater State and Westfield State), 2019–20, 2021–22, 2023-24
- 4x MASCAC Tournament Runner Up – 2013–14, 2015–16, 2016–17, 2017–18
- 4x MASCAC Tournament Champions – 2019–20, 2021–22, 2023-24, 2025-26
- 4x NCAA Division III Women's Basketball Championship Qualifier – 2019-20, 2021-22, 2023-24, 2025-26
- 1x NCAA Statistical Champion - 2024 (Gwendolyn Carpenter - 7.2 assists per game)

=== Cheerleading ===
The Framingham State cheerleading team was formed in 1997 as a club team.

In 2022 The Framingham State cheerleading team won their first national championship by taking first place in the Division III small coed Finals at the National Cheerleaders Association (NCA) Collegiate National Championships in Daytona Beach, Florida. The program had previously participated in the small all-girl division since they began participating in Daytona Beach in 1997; this was their first time competing in the small coed division.

Accomplishments

- 1x National Cheerleaders Association (NCA) Collegiate National Championships Division III small coed National Champions - 2022
- 1x NCA International Intermediate Coed Champions - 2023
- 1x AmeriCheer - AmeriDance International Championship first place - 2023

=== Men's cross country ===
On September 30, 2023, The Framingham State Rams men's and women's cross country team hosted the first ever Ram's Invitational at the Warren Conference Center and Inn in Ashland, Massachusetts. Framingham State hosted the Massachusetts Maritime Buccaneers and the Worcester State Lancers for the first ever Ram's Invitational.

Accomplishments

- 1x Yankee Small College Conference NECA Tournament Champions – 2011

=== Women's cross country ===
On September 30, 2023, The Framingham State Rams men's and women's cross country team hosted the first ever Ram's Invitational at the Warren Conference Center and Inn in Ashland, Massachusetts. Framingham State hosted the Massachusetts Maritime Buccaneers and the Worcester State Lancers for the first ever Ram's Invitational.

Accomplishments

- 1x Yankee Small College Conference NECA Tournament Champions – 2011

=== Football ===
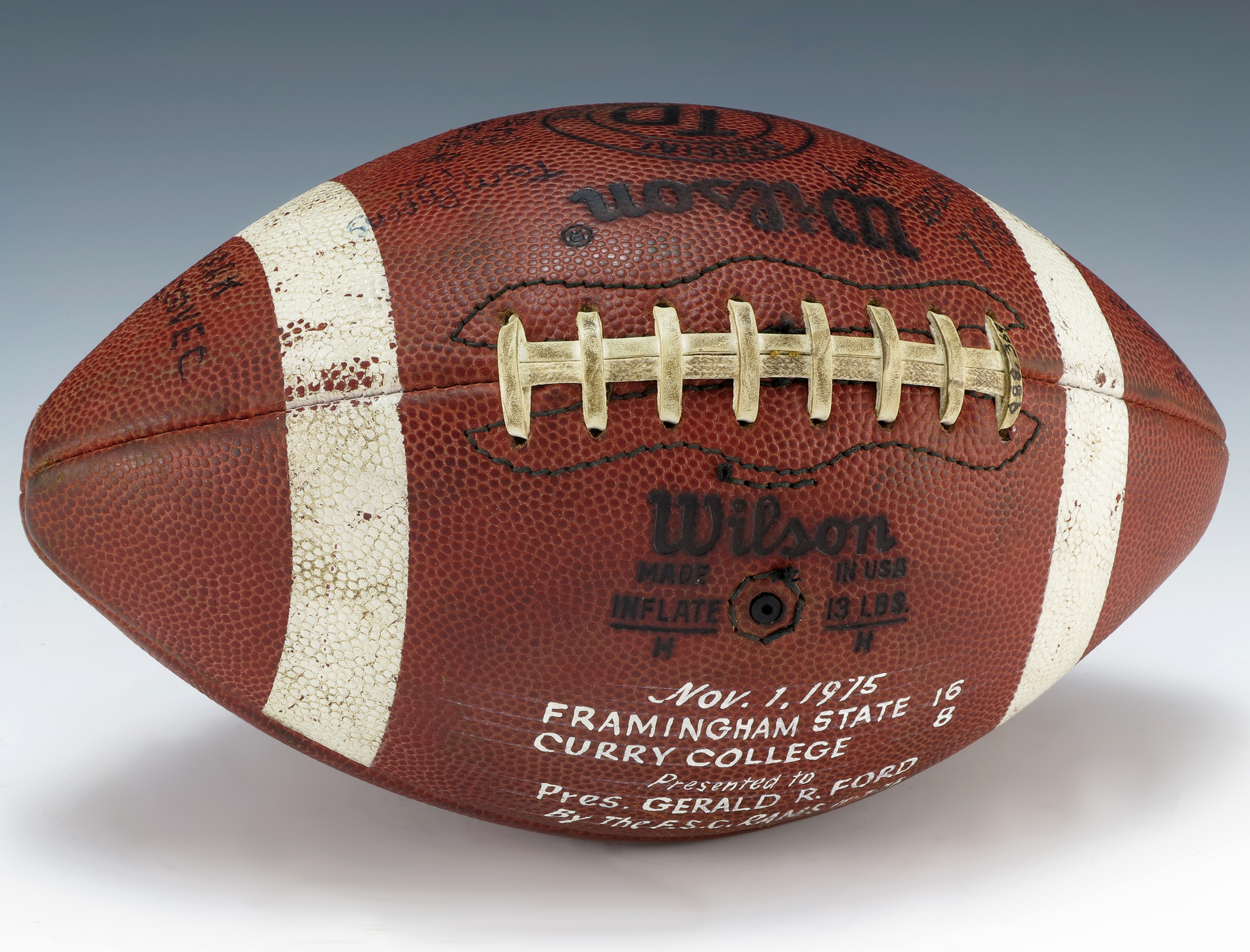
A football signed by the 1975 Framingham State Rams football team after defeating Curry College, 16–8

The football team began play in 1972 and has an overall record of 220-251-2 (.467), 64-8 (.888) in MASCAC conference play as of the end of the 2022 season as Framingham State's most winningest men's program to date. The team's home field is Bowditch Field in Framingham, Massachusetts.

On October 9, 1972, the football team played its first game against the Boston State College Warriors at Bowditch Field in Framingham, Massachusetts. Framingham State won 23–0.

On September 10, 1982, the football team played its first "home" game against the Western New England College Golden Bears at Maple Street Field in Framingham, Massachusetts. Framingham State won 7-6 and the game ball was presented to B.R.D Justin McCarthy being FSC's number one fan. The McCarthy center on the campus of Framingham State is named after Justin McCarthy.

The Framingham State Rams football program has seen several successful seasons in recent years. The Rams won the Massachusetts State College Athletic Conference (MASCAC) regular season championship four straight years (2010, 2011, 2012, 2013). In 2011, 2012, and 2013 the team also took the title as New England Football Conference (NEFC (now Commonwealth Coast Football)) Bogan Division champions, and outright champions in 2012. In 2010, the program won its first Eastern College Athletic Conference (ECAC) Northeast Bowl. The Rams participated in the 2013 NCAA Division III Football Championship, losing to SUNY Cortland in the first-round. In 2014 the Rams were MASCAC Champions & ECAC North Atlantic Bowl Champions winning against RPI 42–36 in Overtime. In 2015 the Rams were MASCAC Champions and participated in the 2015 NCAA Division III Football Championship, losing to Wesley College 42–22. In 2016 the Rams won the New England Bowl v.s. Salve Regina winning 37–34. In 2017 the Rams were MASCAC co-champions and won the 2017 New England Bowl Series against Curry College 48–14. In 2018 the rams were MASCAC Champions and participated in the 2018 NCAA Division III Football Championship losing to Brockport State in the first round 40–27. In 2019 the Rams were MASCAC Champions and participants in the 2019 Division III Football Championship losing to Wesley College in first round 58–21. In 2021 the Rams went 8–2 (8–0 in MASCAC play) in the regular season and were MASCAC Champions along with being participants in the 2021 Division III Football Championship. However the Rams lost to Muhlenberg College in the first round 45–0.

Head coach Thomas (Tom) Kelley '76 coached the Framingham State Rams football team for 2 years as head coach in his first stint from 1982 to 1984. He later returned to the rams football program as head coach for 13 years from 2007 until 2020 going 107–59–1 (.643) in his second head coaching stint. In his second stint he won 9 MASCAC regular season championships, won 4 bowl games, and took the rams to 5 NCAA Division III Football Championship appearances. He currently serves as the athletic director at Framingham State University.

On April 30, 2022, the Seattle Seahawks of the National Football League (NFL) signed defensive end Joshua Onujiogu as an undrafted free agent.

==== Accomplishments ====
The banners at Framingham State's Logan Gymnasium with their MASCAC accomplishments as of Fall 2021.

- 11x MASCAC Regular Season Champions – 2010, 2011, 2012, 2013, 2014, 2015, 2017 (2-way with Plymouth State), 2018, 2019, 2021, 2025 (3-way tie with Anna Maria and Plymouth State)
- 2x New England Football Conference (NEFC) League Champions – 2011, 2012
- 7x NCAA Division III Football Championship Qualifier – 2012, 2013, 2015, 2018, 2019, 2021, 2025
- 1x ECAC Northeast Bowl Champions – 2010
- 1x ECAC North Atlantic Bowl Champions – 2014
- 2x New England Bowl Champions – 2016, 2017

=== Field hockey ===
The Framingham State field hockey team began play in 1987 and has an overall record of 195-405-8 (.327), 55-132-2 (.296) in MASCAC conference play, 71-170 (.294) in Little East Conference play as of the end of the 2022 season. The teams home field is Maple Street Field in Framingham, Massachusetts. The field hockey team (along with Bridgewater State, Fitchburg State, Salem State, Westfield State, and Worcester State) joined the Little East Conference as an affiliate member for field hockey in the 2000–01 season to create a MASCAC division with those 6 schools. In the 2023–24 season the MASCAC division of the Little East became its own separate conference and now currently plays a double round robin in-conference schedule going forward.

Accomplishments

- 2x MASCAC Regular Season Champions – 2004 (2-way with Bridgewater State), 2007 (2-way with Westfield State)
- 1x MASCAC Tournament Runner Up – 2023
- 1x Little East Conference (LEC) Regular Season Champions – 2009 (4-way with Keene State, UMass Dartmouth, and Fitchburg State)

=== Men's ice hockey ===
The Framingham State men's ice hockey team began play in the 1971–72 season and has an overall record of 429-787-60 (.359), 33-168-19 (.193) in MASCAC conference play as of the end of the 2022–23 season. The teams home rink is Loring Ice Arena in Framingham, Massachusetts.

On February 26, 2022, the 7th seeded Framingham State Rams (3–21–1 overall, 1–16–1 in MASCAC play) upset the 2nd seeded Fitchburg State Falcons (17–6–1 overall, 14–3–1 in MASCAC play) at the Wallace Civic Center in Fitchburg, Massachusetts, on a 1–0 overtime win in the MASCAC Men's Hockey Tournament quarterfinal game with the overtime game-winning goal scored by freshman forward Kaleb Kinskey on a power play goal with 12 minutes and 48 seconds to go in the first overtime period.

After the overtime goal the Framingham State ice hockey team and fans were celebrating on the glass when all of a sudden the glass broke after a Framingham State player jumped on to the glass while celebrating. This moment was featured on the Barstool Sports Instagram account among others.

It was the Rams first MASCAC Men's Hockey tournament win since 2014, although they subsequently lost 8–4 to the 1st seeded Plymouth State Panthers (19–6–2 overall, 14–2–2 in MASCAC play) in the MASCAC tournament semifinals 3 days later on March 1, 2022.

Accomplishments

- 1x ECAC Division III Champions – 1979

=== Women's ice hockey ===
The Framingham State women's ice hockey team began play in the 2024–25 season. The teams home rink is the Loring Ice Arena in Framingham, Massachusetts.

On October 16, 2023, Framingham State announced that Women's Ice Hockey will be the 15th varsity sport along with the 9th women's varsity sport on campus. In that same announcement the Rams hired the program's first head coach Robert Lavin, who previously served as head coach for the Rams men's ice hockey program from the 2001–02 season to the 2002–03 season.

Accomplishments

=== Men's lacrosse ===
The Framingham State men's lacrosse team is a club team that began play in 2005 and has an overall record of 26-57 (.313) as of the end of the 2023 season. The team competes in the Continental Lacrosse Conference (Division III) in the Men's Collegiate Lacrosse Association (MCLA). On April 24, 2023, the Framingham State Rams completed their first undefeated regular season with an overall record of 5-0 topped off by a 4–2 win over the Fitchburg State Falcons under first year head coach Tim Ryan.

Accomplishments

- 1x Continental Lacrosse Conference Division III Regular Season Champions – 2023

=== Women's lacrosse ===
The Framingham State women's lacrosse team began play in 2007 as a club team but got elevated to varsity status in 2008 and has an overall record of 129-119 (.520), 40-25 (.615) in MASCAC conference play, 11-11 (.500) in NEWLA (New England Women's Lacrosse Alliance) conference play as of the end of the 2023 season as Framingham State's winningest overall program to date. The teams home field is Maple Street Field in Framingham, Massachusetts.

On May 7, 2022, the second seeded Framingham State Rams (11–7 overall, 6–1 in MASCAC conference play) won their first ever MASCAC tournament championship at home against the fourth seeded Bridgewater State Bears (10–9 overall, 4–3 in MASCAC conference play) by a score of 18–10, after heavy favorites, the number one seed Westfield State Owls (12-6 overall, 7–0 in MASCAC conference play), got upset in the MASCAC quarterfinals by Bridgewater State 14-13 two days prior on May 5, 2022. The Rams were led by first-year head coach Devyne Doran, and MASCAC tournament MVP, sophomore midfielder Rachel Erickson. The Rams were selected into the NCAA Division III Women's Lacrosse Championship for the first time ever in program history, and on May 14, 2022, the Rams were matched up with the St. Mary's College of Maryland Seahawks at the campus of The College of New Jersey in Ewing, New Jersey. The Seahawks won with a final score of 19–9.

Accomplishments

- 3x MASCAC Regular Season Champions – 2019, 2021 (3-way with Westfield State and Worcester State), 2024
- 1x MASCAC Tournament Champions – 2022
- 5x MASCAC Tournament Runner Up – 2018, 2019, 2021, 2023, 2024
- 1x NCAA Division III Women's Lacrosse Championship Qualifier – 2022
- 1x New England Women's Lacrosse Alliance Team Sportsmanship Award – 2011

=== Men's soccer ===
The Framingham State men's soccer team began play in 1968 and has an overall record of 332-496-57 (.407), 122-195-21 (.392) in MASCAC conference play as of the end of the 2022 season. The teams home field is Maple Street Field in Framingham, Massachusetts.

Accomplishments

- 7x MASCAC Regular Season Champions – 2007, 2008, 2011, 2012 (2-way with Salem State), 2018, 2019 (2-way with Salem State), 2022
- 3x MASCAC Tournament Champions – 2008, 2011, 2019
- 3x MASCAC Tournament Runner Up – 2015, 2018, 2021
- 3x NCAA Division III Men's Soccer Championship Qualifier – 2008, 2011, 2019

=== Women's soccer ===
The Framingham State women's soccer team began play in 1982 and has an overall record of 308-347-32 (.471), 99-100-15 (.497) in MASCAC conference play as of the end of the 2022 season. The teams home field is Maple Street Field in Framingham, Massachusetts.

On May 26, 2008, the women's soccer team was presented with the 2007-08 NCAA Sportsmanship Award by the NCAA Committee on Sportsmanship and Ethical Conduct, for their actions on October 29, 2006, during a MASCAC match against the Bridgewater State College Bears. Freshman forward Kellen Dougherty, who scored a contentious goal in the 59th minute, immediately informed the bench and head coach Tucker Reynolds that the goal should not have been given because the ball went through the side netting rather than the goal post. Reynolds told his squad to alert the referees to the mistake, and after some discussion, they decided to uphold the decision, giving the Rams a 1–0 lead. By telling his squad to enable Bridgewater State to score and tie the score at 1 again in the ensuing minute of play, Reynolds attempted to right the injustice.

In 2013 Kayla Austin, a Criminology major, was selected as a member of the second team of the College Sports Information Directors of America (CoSIDA) Capital One Academic All America Team.

Accomplishments

- 7x MASCAC Regular Season Champions – 1999, 2000, 2001, 2002, 2003, 2004 (2-way with Salem State), 2013
- 2x MASCAC Tournament Champions – 2000, 2001
- 1x ECAC Division III New England Women's Soccer Champions – 2014
- 3x NCAA Division III Women's Soccer Championship Qualifier – 1999, 2000, 2001
- 1x NCAA Sportsmanship Award – 2007-08 (for 2006 team)
- 1x Massachusetts Association For Intercollegiate Athletics For Women (MAIAW) Champions – 1998
- 3x National Association of Collegiate Directors of Athletics (NACDA) Conference Champions – 1999–2000, 2000–01, 2001–02

=== Softball ===
The Framingham State softball team began play in 1976 and has an overall record of 622-801 (.437), 258-316 (.449) in MASCAC conference play as of the end of the 2023 season. The teams home field is Maple Street Field in Framingham, Massachusetts.

Accomplishments

- 4x MASCAC Regular Season Champions – 2017, 2019 (2-way with Bridgewater State), 2021, 2023
- 7x MASCAC Tournament Champions – 2007, 2017, 2018, 2019, 2022, 2023, 2024
- 3x MASCAC Tournament Runner Up – 2004, 2006, 2021
- 7x NCAA Division III Softball Championship Qualifier – 2007, 2017, 2018, 2019, 2022, 2023, 2024

=== Women's volleyball ===
The Framingham State women's volleyball team began play in 1975 and has an overall record of 538-550 (.494), 148-98 (.601) in MASCAC conference play as of the end of the 2022 season. The teams home floor is the Logan Gymnasium in Framingham, Massachusetts.

Accomplishments

- 7x MASCAC Regular Season Champions – 1991, 1992 (2-way with Salem State), 2012, 2014, 2015 (2-way with MCLA), 2016, 2022 (2-way with Westfield State)
- 4x MASCAC Tournament Runner Up – 2005, 2013, 2017, 2019
- 6x MASCAC Tournament Champions – 2012, 2014, 2015, 2016, 2021, 2023
- 6x NCAA Division III Women's Volleyball Championship Qualifier – 2012, 2014, 2015, 2016, 2021, 2023
- 1x Massachusetts State Colleges Women's Volleyball Champions – 1972–73

== Facilities ==
All teams compete on campus at the Athletic and Recreation Center (Richard C. Logan Gymnasium) for indoor sports and Maple Street Field for outdoor sports, except for the baseball and football teams who play off-campus at Bowditch Field in Framingham, and the men's ice hockey team who skates at the Loring Arena (also off-campus) also in Framingham.

- Athletic and Recreation Center and the Richard C. Logan Gymnasium – Located on the southeastern end of the main campus of Framingham State University, attached to Dwight Hall, the Athletic and Recreation Center opened in November, 2001 and is home to the men's and women's basketball teams and the women's volleyball team in the Richard C. Logan Gymnasium on the bottom floor. Built at a cost of $12 million the facility features two full-length basketball courts, a volleyball court and seating for 1,000 spectators at home volleyball and basketball games. The second floor of the Athletic and Recreation Center houses a weight room equipped with nautilus machines, cardiovascular equipment, and free weights, as well as two all-purpose rooms which are used for aerobics and dance classes. The Richard C. Logan '70 Gymnasium was dedicated on April 9, 2022, which honors one of the first male students to attend Framingham State University and currently serving as both chair and Vice Chair of the board of trustees at Framingham State University, Richard "Dick" Logan '70.
- Maple Street Field – Located around a half a mile (0.8 km) southwest from the main campus of Framingham State University on 220 Maple Street, Framingham, Massachusetts, the Maple Street Field is home to the men's and women's soccer teams, the women's lacrosse team the club men's lacrosse team, the field hockey team, and the softball team. Maple Street Field is owned and operated by Framingham State University and in the summer of 2014 the Maple Street Field underwent a $4.5 million renovation and the project updated the existing game field, added a second multi-sport softball/practice turf field, lights, two scoreboards (one for each field), and the construction of an auxiliary athletics building. The auxiliary athletics building which is located between the two fields provides heated bathrooms for athletes and spectators, team rooms for the participating teams, as well as a ticket booth, and concessions area.
  - Game Field (Turf) – Home to the men's and women's soccer teams, the women's lacrosse team, the club men's lacrosse team, and the field hockey team the game field located on the west end of the complex, features a 4-lane track, goal posts for football practice, goals for field hockey, lacrosse, and soccer, bleachers with a seating capacity of 900, a fully enclosed two-tiered press box, and a turf field with lines for football, lacrosse, soccer, and field hockey. In addition, the existing game field was outfitted with lights to allow for games and practices to be held at night. The bleachers, the press box, the turf field, the scoreboard, and the lights were added as a part of the $4.5 million renovation in summer of 2014. In the summer of 2024 a new video scoreboard was added replacing its over 20 year old dot-matrix scoreboard. This marked the first time Framingham State installed a video scoreboard for its sports teams.
  - Softball/Practice Field (Turf) – Home to the softball team, the new multi-sport turf field, located on the east end of the complex, opened in summer of 2014 has a softball field and a practice field on it. The softball/practice field has a multi-sport scoreboard, lights for night games, covered dugouts, as well as a bullpen area beyond the left field fence. When the portable 6 foot fence is in place for softball in spring, the dimensions are 200 ft (61 meters). down the lines and 220 ft (67 meters). to center field. When the fence for softball is not in place after spring, the turf has space for a regulation football field which is mainly used for practice by softball and other sports teams.
- Bowditch Field – Located on 475 Union Avenue, Framingham, Massachusetts, around a mile (1.61 km) southeast away from the main campus of Framingham State University, Bowditch Field is home to the football and baseball teams. The complex is owned by the City of Framingham and operated by the City of Framingham Division of Parks and Recreation and Cultural Affairs. Bowditch Field also serves as the headquarters for the City of Framingham Division of Parks and Recreation and Cultural Affairs. Bowditch Field opened in the 1930s as a Works Progress Administration project during the Great Depression, and is home to a natural-grass football field, a natural-grass baseball field, 4 tennis courts, 2 basketball courts and a track and field practice area.
  - Football Field (Grass) – Located on the south end of the complex, the football field features a natural-grass playing surface, with a 6-lane track, and modern stands capable of accommodating 3,500-5,300+ spectators. The original 1930s bleachers along with the entire stadium were replaced and renovated in 2010. The stadium features a press box, a scoreboard, and lights for night games.
  - William D. Carey Baseball Field (Grass) – Located on the north end of the complex, the baseball field is an NCAA regulation sized natural-grass baseball field with dimensions of 346 ft (105.5 meters) to left field, 364 ft (111 meters) to center field, and 304 ft (92.66 meters) to right field. The field features a scoreboard and lights for night games.
- Edward F. Loring Ice Arena – Located on 165 Fountain Street, Framingham, Massachusetts, around 2 miles (3.22 km) south away from the main campus of Framingham State University, Loring Arena is home to the men's and women's ice hockey teams. The arena is a City of Framingham owned skating facility, operated by the City of Framingham Division of Parks Recreation and Cultural Affairs. Loring Arena opened in November 1963 as a seasonally operated facility, and one of the first municipally owned arenas in the area. Loring Arena underwent a complete renovation beginning in May 2017. The $6 million renovation and expansion project was completed in the fall of 2018 and included a dedicated locker room and storage space for the FSU ice hockey programs.

Bowditch Field and Loring Arena are used not only by the Framingham State Rams baseball, football, and men's ice hockey teams respectively but the Framingham High School Flyers for their baseball, football and men's/women's ice hockey teams as well respectively.

In addition to playing their home games at Bowditch Field the Framingham State Rams baseball team also play their early season home games at the New England Baseball Complex in Northborough, Massachusetts, around 12 miles (19.3 km) away.

Note: women's outdoor track and field do not have a home track (no home meets) respectively as of Spring 2024.

Framingham State Rams athletic facilities locations
Locations of the sports at the athletics facilities used by the Framingham State Rams athletic teams in relation to campus, 2024-25 Campus Center (McCarthy Center) Athletic and Recreation Center (on-campus, owned and operated by Framingham State University) Maple Street Field (off-campus, owned and operated by Framingham State University) Bowditch Field (off-campus, owned and operated by the city of Framingham) and Loring Arena (off-campus, owned and operated by the city of Framingham). M = Men's W = Women's
