= New England Baseball Complex =

Baseball complex in Massachusetts, US

- NEBC

- Location in Massachusetts
- Address: 333 Southwest Cutoff, Northborough, Massachusetts, United States
- Coordinates: 42°17′07″N 71°39′57″W
- Owner: New England Baseball Enterprises
- Type: Baseball complex
- Event: Sporting events
- Surface: Artificial turf
- Scoreboard: Yes
- Acreage: 30

Construction
- Built: 2014
- Cost: $25 million

Tenants
- New England Ruffnecks (2014-2020); 3STEP Sports (2020-2025); Perfect Game, Inc. (2025-present)

Website
- newenglandbaseball.com

The New England Baseball Complex (NEBC) is a 30-acre baseball complex in Northborough, Massachusetts owned by the New England Baseball Enterprises. The complex is home to the New England Ruffnecks.

In the NEBC's opening season, multiple colleges have played here including Boston College Eagles against NC State Wolfpack in an Atlantic Coast Conference two game series. Other schools include Connecticut Huskies, WPI Engineers and Holy Cross Crusaders.

Youth tournaments for ages 10 through 18 are held at the New England Baseball Complex quite often.

The three fields are the size of Major League Baseball, Babe Ruth League, or high school and college fields. They can be converted into smaller fields such as those for Little League Baseball and other youth baseball associations for children 12 and under. Lacrosse and Soccer are also capable of being hosted at the NEBC.

In the future, they plan to build indoor hitting tunnels, and a clubhouse for Ruffneck players and teams. They also plan for a performance training facility.
