= Massachusetts State Collegiate Athletic Conference =

Athletic conference in Massachusetts, United States

- Association: NCAA
- Founded: 1971
- Commissioner: Angela Baumann (since 2006)
- Sports fielded: 16; men's: 8; women's: 8
- Division: Division III
- No. of teams: 8 full, 7 associate
- Country: United States
- Headquarters: Westfield, Massachusetts
- Region: Massachusetts, New England and Mid-Atlantic (with associates)
- Website: www.mascac.com

Locations
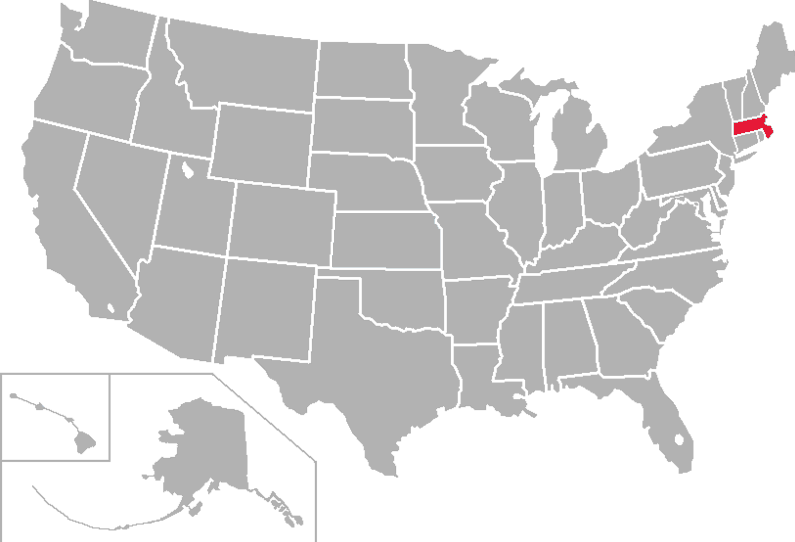

The Massachusetts State Collegiate Athletic Conference (MASCAC) is an intercollegiate athletic conference affiliated with the NCAA's Division III. Full member institutions are all located in the Commonwealth of Massachusetts with affiliate members also located in Connecticut, New Hampshire, Pennsylvania, Vermont, and Virginia. The Massachusetts State Collegiate Athletic Conference was established in June 1971, making it the oldest NCAA Division III men's and women's playing college athletic conference in the United States.

All full members are a part of the Massachusetts State Universities system (every member in the Massachusetts State Universities system except the Massachusetts College of Art and Design is also a MASCAC member) and the public associate members are part of the University of Massachusetts System [UMASS System (UMASS Dartmouth)], the University System of New Hampshire (Plymouth State University), and the Connecticut State University System (Western Connecticut State University) respectively. The rest of the associate members are private colleges.

On October 5, 2023, it was announced that in the 2025–26 school year, Anna Maria College in Paxton, Massachusetts will become the first private full member in the 53 year history of the MASCAC and the first new full member since 1974. However, the college would later announce its permanent closure on April 23, 2026, with the 2025–26 school year being Anna Maria’s only season in the MASCAC.

== History ==
Massachusetts State Collegiate Athletic Conference
Locations of MASCAC members: full, future, current associate, future associate (note: map does not show men's golf affiliate Marymount (in Arlington, Virginia)

=== Recent events ===
On April 21, 2022, the Massachusetts College of Liberal Arts (MCLA) announced they would reinstate men's ice hockey for the first time since 2002–03 and add women's ice hockey, beginning the 2023–24 academic year.

On January 5, 2023, Vermont State University at Castleton (Vermont State–Castleton) announced that it would join the MASCAC as an associate member for football, beginning in the 2024 fall season of the 2024–25 academic year.

On June 14, 2023, Anna Maria College and Rivier University joined the MASCAC as associate members for men's ice hockey and provisional women's ice hockey members beginning in the 2024 fall season of 2024–25 academic year.

On October 5, 2023, Anna Maria later announced that it would join the MASCAC as a full member, beginning in the 2025–26 academic year; thus becoming the first full private school member in conference history and the first new full member since Massachusetts Maritime in 1974.

On October 10, 2023, Dean College announced that it would join the MASCAC as an associate member for football, beginning in the 2025 fall season of the 2025–26 academic year.

On February 29, 2024, Plymouth State University and the University of Massachusetts at Dartmouth (UMass–Darthmouth) became the first MASCAC associate members to upgrade as affiliate members for football (after years as associate members since the 2013 fall season), beginning the 2025 fall season of the 2025–26 academic year.

On August 8, 2024, Marymount University and Marywood University announced it would join the MASCAC as associate members for men's golf, beginning almost immediately for the 2024 fall season of the 2024-25 academic year as the first members (full or associate) in conference history outside of New England.

=== Chronological timeline ===
- 1971 – In June 1971, the Massachusetts State Collegiate Athletic Conference (MASCAC) was founded. Charter members included Boston State College, Bridgewater State College (now Bridgewater State University), Fitchburg State College (now Fitchburg State University), Framingham State College (now Framingham State University), Lowell State College, North Adams State College (now the Massachusetts College of Liberal Arts [MCLA]), Salem State College (now Salem State University), Westfield State College (now Westfield State University) and Worcester State College (now Worcester State University), beginning the 1971–72 academic year.
- 1974 – The Massachusetts Maritime Academy (Mass Maritime) joined the MASCAC in the 1974–75 academic year.
- 1975 – Lowell State College left the MASCAC when it was merged into Lowell Technological Institute to become the University of Lowell (now the University of Massachusetts at Lowell [a.k.a. UMass–Lowell]) after the 1974–75 academic year.
- 1982 – Boston State College left the MASCAC when it was merged into the University of Massachusetts at Boston (a.k.a. UMass–Boston) after the 1981–82 academic year.
- 2009 – The University of Massachusetts at Dartmouth (a.k.a. UMass–Dartmouth) and Plymouth State University joined the MASCAC as associate members for men's ice hockey in the 2009–10 academic year. This marked the first time the MASCAC added associate members and it marked the first time that the MASCAC added members (full or associate) outside of Massachusetts.
- 2013 – The MASCAC began sponsoring football in the 2013 fall season (2013–14 academic year) after the New England Football Conference (NEFC) dissolved; with Western Connecticut State University (alongside UMass Dartmouth and Plymouth State) joining as MASCAC as associate members for the sport.
- 2018 – Western Connecticut State added men's golf into its MASCAC associate membership in the 2019 spring season (2018–19 academic year).
- 2019:
  - Western Connecticut State left the MASCAC as an associate member for men's golf after the 2019 spring season (2018–19 academic year).
  - Dean College, Eastern Nazarene College, Elms College, Mitchell College and Springfield College joined the MASCAC as associate members for men's golf in the 2020 spring season (2019–20 academic year). This marks the first time that the MASCAC added private institutions under the MASCAC banner for any sport.
- 2020 – Dean left the MASCAC as an associate member for men's golf after the 2020 spring season (2019–20 academic year).
- 2021:
  - Elms left the MASCAC as an associate member for men's golf after the 2021 spring season (2020–21 academic year).
  - New England College joined the MASCAC as an associate member for men's golf in the 2022 spring season (2021–22 academic year).
- 2023:
  - Eastern Nazarene, Mitchell and New England (N.H.) left the MASCAC as associate members for men's golf after the 2023 spring season (2022–23 academic year).
  - MCLA reinstated its men's ice hockey program for the first time since 2002–03, while adding a women's ice hockey program, both effective in the 2023–24 academic year.
- 2024:
  - Anna Maria College and Rivier University joined the MASCAC as associate members for men's ice hockey and provisional women's ice hockey members in the 2024 fall season (2024–25 academic year).
  - Vermont State University at Castleton (VSU Castleton) joined the MASCAC as an associate member for football in the 2024 fall season (2024–25 academic year).
  - Marymount University and Marywood University joined the MASCAC as associate members for men's golf in the 2024 fall season (2024–25 academic year); thus being the first members (full or associate) in conference history outside of New England.
- 2025:
  - Vermont State–Castleton (VSU Castleton) and Western Connecticut State left the MASCAC as associate members for football after the 2024 fall season (2024–25 academic year).
  - Anna Maria upgraded as a full member of the MASCAC for all sports in the 2025–26 academic year; thus being the first full private school member in conference history and the first new full member since Massachusetts Maritime in 1974.
  - Dean rejoined the MASCAC as an associate member for football (formerly competing for men's golf), with Plymouth State and UMass–Darthmouth upgrading to affiliate member status, all effective in the 2025 fall season (2025–26 academic year).
- 2026:
  - Anna Maria left the MASCAC after the 2025–26 academic year; as the school announced that it would be ceasing operations.
  - Kean University joined the MASCAC as a men's golf affiliate beginning in the 2026-27 academic year.
  - The University of Saint Joseph joined the MASCAC as an associate member for men's and women's ice hockey in the 2026–27 academic year.
  - Marywood left the MASCAC as associate members for men's golf after the 2026 spring season (2025-26 academic year).
  - Men's lacrosse became the 20th sponsored sport in the MASCAC, beginning the 2026–27 academic year. Alongside full members MCLA, Mass Maritime and Salem State, Husson University, Maine Maritime Academy and Thomas College will join as affiliate members for the sport.
- 2027:
  - Vermont State–Castleton will join the MASCAC for all sports in the 2027–28 academic year; thus being the first full member outside of the state of Massachusetts in conference history.
  - Fitchburg State will add women's ice hockey as a varsity sport, beginning the 2027–28 academic year.

== Member schools ==
=== Current full members ===
The MASCAC currently has eight full members, and all are public schools:

Institution	Location (Note: All cities are located in the State of Massachusetts.)	Founded	Affiliation (Note: Any school that's a private school will be classified based on a religious affiliation; unless it had none, hence being nonsectarian.)	Enrollment	Endowment (millions)	Nickname	Joined (Note: Represents the calendar year when fall sports competition begins.)	Colors
Bridgewater State University (Note: School does not sponsor ice hockey.)	Bridgewater	1840	Public (Note: Part of the Massachusetts State Universities System.)	9,550	$54.0	Bears	1971	
Fitchburg State University	Fitchburg	1894	Public	6,296	$19.9	Falcons	1971	
Framingham State University	Framingham	1839	Public	4,111	$35.4 (Note: Actual amount in endowment is $35,385,907.)	Rams	1971	
Massachusetts College of Liberal Arts (Note: School does not sponsor football.) (MCLA)	North Adams	1894	Public	933	$14.7	Trailblazers	1971	
Massachusetts Maritime Academy (Note: School does not sponsor men's or women's basketball.)	Buzzards Bay	1891	Public	1,362	$13.1 (Note: Actual amount in endowment is $13,051,554.)	Buccaneers	1974	
Salem State University	Salem	1854	Public	6,239	$25.3	Vikings	1971	
Westfield State University	Westfield	1838	Public	4,602	$20.0 (Note: Actual amount in endowment is $20,002,999.)	Owls	1971	
Worcester State University	Worcester	1874	Public	5,611	$34.5	Lancers	1971	

=== Current associate members ===
The MASCAC currently has eleven associate members, all but three are private schools:

Institution	Location	Founded	Affiliation (Note: Any school that's a private school will be classified based on a religious affiliation; unless it had none, hence being nonsectarian.)	Enrollment	Nickname	Joined	MASCAC sport(s)	Primary conference
Dean College	Franklin, Massachusetts	1865	Nonsectarian	1,151	Bulldogs	2025	football	Great Northeast (GNAC)
Husson University	Bangor, Maine	1898	Nonsectarian	3,065	Eagles	2026	men's lacrosse	North Atlantic (NAC)
Kean University	Union, New Jersey	1855	Public	13,352	Cougars	2026	men's golf	New Jersey (NJAC)
Maine Maritime Academy	Castine, Maine	1941	Public	979	Mariners	2026	men's lacrosse	North Atlantic (NAC)
Marymount University	Arlington, Virginia	1950	Catholic (RSHM)	3,667	Saints	2024	men's golf	Atlantic East (AEC) (United East in 2027)
Plymouth State University	Plymouth, New Hampshire	1871	Public (Note: Part of the University System of New Hampshire.)	3,839	Panthers	2013	football	Little East (LEC)
Rivier University	Nashua, New Hampshire	1933	Catholic (S.P.M.)	2,822	Raiders	2024	men's ice hockey	Great Northeast (GNAC)
Rivier University	Nashua, New Hampshire	1933	Catholic (S.P.M.)	2,822	Raiders	2024	women's ice hockey	Great Northeast (GNAC)
University of Saint Joseph	West Hartford, Connecticut	1932	Catholic (R.S.M.)	2,467	Blue Jays	2026	men's ice hockey	Great Northeast (GNAC)
University of Saint Joseph	West Hartford, Connecticut	1932	Catholic (R.S.M.)	2,467	Blue Jays	2026	women's ice hockey	Great Northeast (GNAC)
Springfield College	Springfield, Massachusetts	1885	Nonsectarian	2,785	Pride	2019	men's golf	New England (NEWMAC)
Thomas College	Waterville, Maine	1894	Nonsectarian	1,949	Terriers	2026	men's lacrosse	North Atlantic (NAC)
University of Massachusetts–Dartmouth	Dartmouth, Massachusetts	1895	Public (Note: Part of the University of Massachusetts System.)	7,759	Corsairs	2013	football	Little East (LEC)

=== Future full member ===
The MASCAC will have one new full members, a public schools:

Institution	Location	Founded	Affiliation (Note: Any school that's a private school will be classified based on a religious affiliation; unless it had none, hence being nonsectarian.)	Enrollment	Nickname	Joining (Note: Represents the calendar year when fall sports competition begins.)	Current conference
Vermont State University–Castleton	Castleton, Vermont	1787 (Note: Originally founded in 1787 as Rutland County Grammar School, which would later become Castleton University in 2015; then was refounded as a campus of Vermont State University in 2023.)	Public (Note: Part of the Vermont State Colleges System.)	2,363	Spartans	2027 (Note: Before joining for full membership, VTSU Castleton competed in the MASCAC as an associate member for football during the 2024 fall season (2024–25 academic year).)	Little East (LEC)

=== Former full members ===
The MASCAC had three former full members, two were public schools and one was a private school:

Institution	Location (Note: All cities were located in the State of Massachusetts.)	Founded	Affiliation (Note: Any school that's a private school will be classified based on a religious affiliation; unless it had none, hence being nonsectarian.)	Enrollment	Nickname	Joined (Note: Represents the calendar year when fall sports competition begins.)	Left (Note: Represents the calendar year when spring sports competition ends.)	Colors	Current conference
Anna Maria College	Paxton	1946	Catholic (S.S.A.)	1,485	Amcats	2025 (Note: Before joining for full membership, Anna Maria competed in the MASCAC as an associate member for men's and women's ice hockey during the 2024–25 school year.)	2026		Closed in 2026
Boston State College	Boston	1872	Public	11,000	Warriors	1971	1982	N/A	N/A (Note: Boston State was merged into the University of Massachusetts–Boston.)
Lowell State College	Lowell	1894	Public	2,353	Indians	1971	1975	N/A	N/A (Note: Lowell State was merged into the University of Massachusetts–Lowell.)

=== Former associate members ===
The MASCAC had nine former associate members, five were public schools and four were private schools:

Institution	Location	Founded	Affiliation (Note: Any school that's a private school will be classified based on a religious affiliation; unless it had none, hence being nonsectarian.)	Enrollment	Nickname	Joined (Note: Represents the calendar year when fall sports competition begins.)	Left (Note: Represents the calendar year when spring sports competition ends.)	MASCAC sport(s)	Primary conference
Dean College	Franklin, Massachusetts	1865	Nonsectarian	1,151	Bulldogs	2019	2020	men's golf	Great Northeast (GNAC)
Eastern Nazarene College	Quincy, Massachusetts	1900	Nazarene	535	Lions	2019	2023	men's golf	Closed in 2024
Elms College	Chicopee, Massachusetts	1928	Catholic (S.S.J.)	1,513	Blazers	2019	2021	men's golf	Great Northeast (GNAC)
Marywood University	Scranton, Pennsylvania	1915	Catholic (I.H.M.)	2,606	Pacers	2024	2026	men's golf	MAC Freedom
Mitchell College	New London, Connecticut	1938	Nonsectarian	500	Mariners	2019	2023	men's golf	Great Northeast (GNAC)
New England College	Henniker, New Hampshire	1946	Nonsectarian	2,858	Pilgrims	2021	2023	men's golf	Great Northeast (GNAC)
Plymouth State University	Plymouth, New Hampshire	1871	Public (Note: Part of the University System of New Hampshire.)	3,839	Panthers	2009	2025	men's ice hockey	Little East (LEC)
Plymouth State University	Plymouth, New Hampshire	1871	Public	3,839	Panthers	2024	2025	women's ice hockey	Little East (LEC)
University of Massachusetts–Dartmouth	Dartmouth, Massachusetts	1895	Public (Note: Part of the University of Massachusetts System.)	7,759	Corsairs	2009	2025	men's ice hockey	Little East (LEC)
Vermont State University–Castleton	Castleton, Vermont	1787	Public (Note: Part of the Vermont State Colleges System.)	2,363	Spartans	2024	2025	football	Little East (LEC)
Western Connecticut State University	Danbury, Connecticut	1903	Public (Note: Part of the Connecticut State University System.)	4,417	Wolves	2013	2025	football	Little East (LEC)
Western Connecticut State University	Danbury, Connecticut	1903	Public	4,417	Wolves	2018	2019	men's golf	Little East (LEC)

=== Membership timeline ===
Full member (all sports) Full member (non-football) Associate member (football) Associate member (sport)

== Sports ==
The MASCAC sponsored football for the first time in 2013. Conference members Bridgewater State, Fitchburg State, Framingham State, Massachusetts Maritime, Westfield State, and Worcester State departed the New England Football Conference (NEFC) (now Commonwealth Coast Football) after the 2012 season. They were joined later by fellow NEFC opponents Plymouth State, UMass–Dartmouth, and Western Connecticut State. The NEFC retained the conference's automatic bid to the NCAA Division III playoffs.

On August 22, 2019, the MASCAC invited 5 of the recently dropped men's golf members from the New England Collegiate Conference (NECC) which includes Dean College, Eastern Nazarene College, Elms College, Mitchell College, and Springfield College; all of them are private colleges which is the first time that the MASCAC awarded membership to private colleges. The 5 private colleges joined the other men's golf sponsoring MASCAC schools from the NECC which includes MCLA, Salem State, Westfield State, and Worcester State to create a 9-team men's golf league. However Dean College men's golf left the MASCAC after the 2019-20 men's golf season to join their primary conference the Great Northeast Athletic Conference (GNAC) in men's golf. The MASCAC started Automatic Qualification (AQ) to the NCAA Division III Men's Golf Championships in the 2021–2022 season for the MASCAC men's golf tournament winner.

Conference Sports

Sport	Men's	Women's
Baseball	✓	
Basketball	✓	✓
Cross Country	✓	✓
Field Hockey		✓
Football	✓	
Golf	✓	
Ice Hockey	✓	✓
Lacrosse	✓	✓
Soccer	✓	✓
Softball		✓
Track & Field (Indoor)	✓	✓
Track & Field (Outdoor)	✓	✓
Volleyball		✓

=== Men's Sports ===
School	Baseball	Basketball	Cross Country	Football	Golf	Ice Hockey	Lacrosse	Soccer	Track & Field (Indoor)	Track & Field (Outdoor)	Total MASCAC Sports
Bridgewater State	✓	✓	✓	✓	✗	✗	✗	✓	✓	✓	7
Fitchburg State	✓	✓	✓	✓	✗	✓	✓	✓	✓	✓	9
Framingham State	✓	✓	✓	✓	✗	✓	✗	✓	✗	✗	6
Mass Maritime	✓	✗	✓	✓	✗	✗	✓	✓	✗	✓	6
MCLA	✓	✓	✗	✗	✓	✓	✓	✓	✗	✗	6
Salem State	✓	✓	✗	✗	✓	✓	✓	✓	✗	✗	6
Westfield State	✓	✓	✓	✓	✓	✓	✗	✓	✓	✓	9
Worcester State	✓	✓	✓	✓	✓	✓	✗	✓	✓	✓	9
Totals	8	7	6	6+3	4+3	6+2	4+3	8	4	5	58+11
Affiliate Members
Dean				✓							1
Husson							✓				1
Maine Maritime							✓				1
Marymount					✓						1
Marywood					✓						1
Plymouth State				✓							1
Rivier						✓					1
Saint Joseph (CT)						✓					1
Springfield					✓						1
Thomas							✓				1
UMass Dartmouth				✓							1

==== Men's varsity sports not sponsored by the MASCAC that are played by MASCAC schools ====
School	ESports	Rowing	Sailing	Swimming & Diving	Tennis	Wrestling
Bridgewater State				LEC	LEC	NEWA
Mass Maritime		✓	✓			
MCLA	✓					
Salem State					LEC	

=== Women's Sports ===
School	Basketball	Cross Country	Field Hockey	Ice Hockey	Lacrosse	Soccer	Softball	Track & Field (Indoor)	Track & Field (Outdoor)	Volleyball	Total MASCAC Sports
Bridgewater State	✓	✓	✓	✗	✓	✓	✓	✓	✓	✓	9
Fitchburg State	✓	✓	✓	✗ (Note: Adding in 2027-28)	✓	✓	✓	✓	✓	✓	9
Framingham State	✓	✓	✓	✓	✓	✓	✓	✗	✓	✓	9
Mass Maritime	✗	✓	✗	✗	✓	✓	✓	✗	✓	✓	6
MCLA	✓	✗	✗	✓	✗	✓	✓	✗	✗	✓	5
Salem State	✓	✗	✓	✓	✓	✓	✓	✗	✗	✓	7
Westfield State	✓	✓	✓	✗	✓	✓	✓	✓	✓	✓	9
Worcester State	✓	✓	✓	✓	✓	✓	✓	✓	✓	✓	10
Totals	7	6	6	4+2	7	8	8	4	6	8	64+2
Affiliate Members
Rivier				✓							1
Saint Joseph (CT)				✓							1

==== Women's varsity sports not sponsored by the MASCAC that are played by MASCAC schools ====
School	Equestrian	ESports	Golf	Rowing	Sailing	Swimming & Diving	Tennis
Bridgewater State	IHSA					LEC	LEC
Mass Maritime				✓	✓		
MCLA		✓					
Salem State							LEC
Westfield State			LEC			LEC	
Worcester State			LEC				

=== Football ===
For the current season, see 2025 Massachusetts State Collegiate Athletic Conference football season.

==== All-time school records (ranked according to winning percentage) ====
Through end of the 2022 regular season. Records reflect official NCAA results, including any forfeits or win vacating.

#	MASCAC	Record	Win %	MASCAC Championships
1	Plymouth State	298–198–7	.599	1
2	Bridgewater State	335–238–7	.584	1
3	UMass Dartmouth	181–155	.539	1
4	Worcester State	185–181	.505	0
5	Framingham State	220–251–2	.467	7
6	Massachusetts Maritime	208–253–1	.451	0
7	Westfield State	173–217–1	.444	0
8	Western Connecticut	221–278–4	.443	1
9	Fitchburg State	109–253	.301	0

==== Intra-conference football rivalries ====
The members of the MASCAC have longstanding rivalries with each other, especially on the football field. The following is a list of active rivalries in the MASCAC with totals & records through the completion of the 2022 season.

Teams		Rivalry name	Trophy	Meetings	Record	Series leader	Current streak
Bridgewater State	Massachusetts Maritime	Cranberry Bowl	The Scoop	47	34–12–1	Bridgewater State	Bridgewater State won 5
Bridgewater State	Westfield State	None	None	40	31–9	Bridgewater State	Bridgewater State won 11
Fitchburg State	Worcester State	Sterling Cup	Sterling Cup trophy	37	10–27	Worcester State	Worcester State won 5
Framingham State	Western Connecticut	None	None	19	15–4	Framingham State	Western Connecticut won 1
Framingham State	Massachusetts Maritime	Kelley Bowl	Kelley Cup	50	28–23	Framingham State	Framingham State won 14
Framingham State	Worcester State	Route 9 Cup	None	37	18–20	Worcester State	Framingham State won 10
Massachusetts Maritime	Bridgewater State	Cranberry Bowl	The Scoop	47	12–34–1	Bridgewater State	Bridgewater State won 5
Massachusetts Maritime	Framingham State	Kelley Bowl	Kelley Cup	50	23–28	Framingham State	Framingham State won 14
Plymouth State	UMass Dartmouth	None	None	23	11–12	UMass Dartmouth	UMass Dartmouth won 4
UMass Dartmouth	Plymouth State	None	None	23	12–11	UMass Dartmouth	UMass Dartmouth won 4
Western Connecticut	Framingham State	None	None	19	4–15	Framingham State	Western Connecticut won 1
Westfield State	Bridgewater State	None	None	40	9–31	Bridgewater State	Bridgewater State won 11
Worcester State	Fitchburg State	Sterling Cup	Sterling Cup trophy	37	27–10	Worcester State	Worcester State won 5
Worcester State	Framingham State	Route 9 Cup	None	37	20–18	Worcester State	Framingham State won 10

==== Football champions ====
		Record		Ranking		
Year	Champions	Conference	Overall	D3.com	Bowl result	Head coach
2013	Framingham State	8–0	9–2	N/A	L NCAA Division III First Round 17–20 vs. Ithaca	Tom Kelley
2014	Framingham State	8–0	10–1	N/A	W ECAC North Atlantic Bowl	Tom Kelley
2015	Framingham State	8–0	9–2	N/A	L NCAA Division III First Round 22–42 vs. Wesley	Tom Kelley
2016	Bridgewater State	8–0	8–3	N/A	L NCAA Division III First Round 27–33 vs. Alfred	Joe Verria
2017	Framingham State	7–1	10–1	N/A	W New England Bowl	Tom Kelley
2017	Plymouth State	7–1	9–2	N/A	L NCAA Division III First Round 0–66 vs. Brockport	Paul Castonia
2018	Framingham State	7–1	8–3	N/A	L NCAA Division III First Round 27–40 vs. Brockport	Tom Kelley
2019	Framingham State	8–0	8–3	N/A	L NCAA Division III First Round 21–58 vs. Wesley	Tom Kelley
2020	MASCAC season cancelled due to the COVID-19 pandemic.					
2021	Framingham State	8–0	8–3	N/A	L NCAA Division III First Round 0–45 vs. Muhlenberg	Tom Kelley
2022	UMass Dartmouth	8–0	9–2	N/A	L NCAA Division III First Round 20–63 vs. Ithaca	Mark Robichaud
2023	Western Connecticut	7-1	7-3	N/A	L NCAA Division III First Round 20–62 vs. Johns Hopkins	Joe Loth
