= Aynsley Rosenbaum =

American football player and coach (born 1977)

Current position
- Title: Offensive coordinator, quarterbacks coach
- Team: Merrimack
- Conference: Independent

Biographical details
- Born: c. 1977 (age 48–49); Phoenix, Arizona, U.S.

Playing career
- 1995–1997: Framingham State
- Position: Running back

Coaching career (HC unless noted)
- 2001–2007: Arlington Catholic HS (MA) (assistant)
- 2008–2019: Framingham State (OC)
- 2020: Framingham State (Note: Rosenbaum was named head football coach before the season was ultimately canceled due to COVID-19.)
- 2021: Merrimack (TE/WR)
- 2022: Merrimack (QB/PGC)
- 2023–present: Merrimack (OC/QB)

Head coaching record
- Overall: 0–0

Aynsley Keith Rosenbaum (born c. 1979) is an American college football coach. He is currently the offensive coordinator and quarterbacks coach for Merrimack College, positions he has held since 2023. He previously coached for Arlington Catholic High School and Framingham State. He played college football for Framingham State as a running back.
