= Bowditch Field =

Sports venue in Massachusetts, US

Coordinates: 42.2939°N 71.4257°W

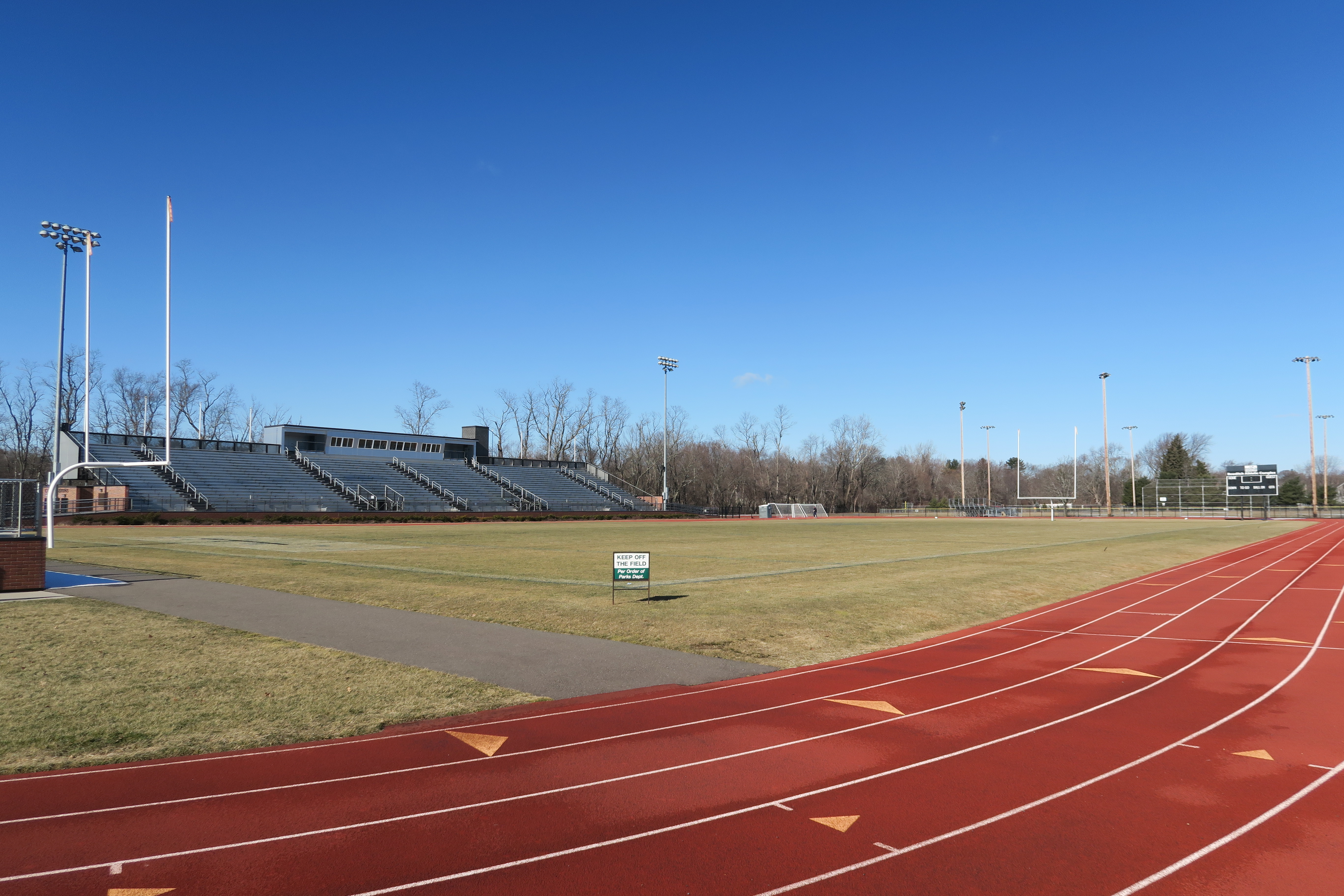
- Interactive map of Bowditch Field
- Location: 475 Union Avenue; Framingham, Massachusetts, United States
- Owner: City of Framingham
- Seating type: Bleachers
- Capacity: 3,500+
- Surface: Natural grass
- Scoreboard: Yes

Construction
- Opened: 1930s

Tenants
- Framingham State Rams Framingham High Flyers

Bowditch Field Athletic and Cultural Complex (or simply Bowditch Field) is the main public athletic facility for the City of Framingham, Massachusetts, US. It is located on Union Avenue midway between Downtown and Framingham Center. The facility houses a large multi-purpose football stadium that includes permanent bleachers on both sides of the field.

The football field is home to the Framingham State University Rams football team and the Framingham High School Flyers football team. There is a baseball field (which is home to the Framingham State Rams and Framingham High Flyers baseball teams) with lights for night games and permanent bleachers on both dugouts, four tennis courts, two basketball courts, a track and field practice area, and the headquarters of the City Parks Department. Bowditch Field, along with Butterworth and Winch Parks, were all built during the Great Depression of the 1930s as Works Progress Administration projects.

Both the baseball and football fields are natural grass and the dimensions of the baseball field are 304 feet to right field, 364 feet to center field, and 346 feet to left field.
