= Mid-Atlantic =

Mid-Atlantic or Mid Atlantic can refer to:

- The middle of the Atlantic Ocean
- Mid-Atlantic English, any mix between British and American English
- Mid-Atlantic Region (Little League World Series), one of the United States geographic divisions of the Little League World Series
- Mid-Atlantic Ridge, an underwater mountain range in the Atlantic Ocean separating two tectonic plates
- Mid-Atlantic (United States), a geographic region of the United States
- Mid-Atlantic Athletic Conference, an athletic league in the United States
- Mid-Atlantic Championship Wrestling, brand name for wrestling events promoted by Jim Crockett Promotions
