= 2019 WPI Engineers football team =

American college football season

2019 WPI Engineers football
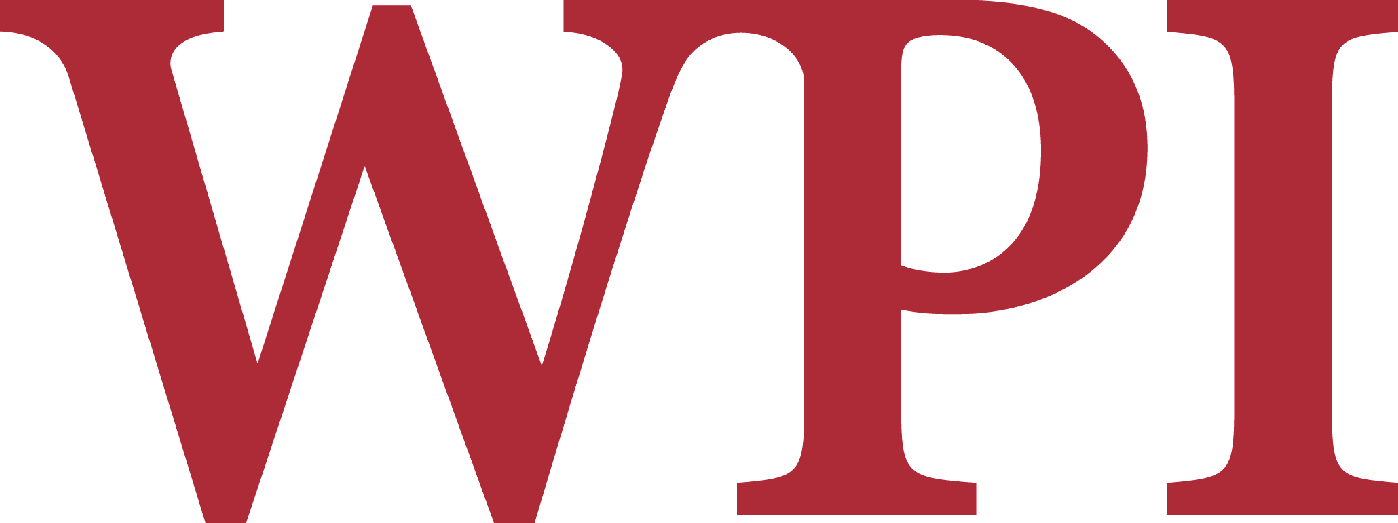

NEWMAC co-champion

New England Bowl, W 35–6 vs. Western Connecticut
- Conference: New England Women's and Men's Athletic Conference
- Record: 10–1 (6–1 NEWMAC)
- Head coach: Chris Robertson (10th season)
- Offensive coordinator: Matt Kelly (3rd season)
- Defensive coordinator: Scott Sperone (3rd season)
- Captains: Sean McAllen; Sam Casey; Nick Ostrowski
- Home stadium: Alumni Stadium

2019 New England Women's and Men's Athletic Conference football standings
| | Conf. | | | Overall |
| Team | W | | L | W | | L |
|---|---|---|---|---|---|---|
| WPI + | 6 | – | 1 | 10 | – | 1 |
| MIT +^ | 6 | – | 1 | 7 | – | 3 |
| Merchant Marine | 5 | – | 2 | 6 | – | 3 |
| Springfield | 5 | – | 2 | 6 | – | 4 |
| Coast Guard | 2 | – | 5 | 5 | – | 5 |
| Norwich | 2 | – | 5 | 5 | – | 5 |
| Catholic University | 2 | – | 5 | 2 | – | 8 |
| Maine Maritime | 0 | – | 7 | 0 | – | 10 |
+ – Conference co-champions; ^ – NCAA Division III playoff participant

The 2019 WPI Engineers football team represented Worcester Polytechnic Institute (WPI) as a member of the New England Women's and Men's Athletic Conference (NEWMAC) during the 2019 NCAA Division III football season. Led by tenth-year head coach Chris Robertson, the Engineers compiled an overall record of 10–1 with a mark of 6–1 in conference play, sharing the NEWMAC title with MIT. WPI was invited to the New England Bowl, where the Engineers defeated Western Connecticut. The team played home games at Alumni Stadium in Worcester, Massachusetts.

The Engineers finished the regular season with its fifth consecutive winning season, and the program's first ever season with ten wins.

== Schedule ==
In 2019, WPI faced all seven NEWMAC opponents: Catholic, Coast Guard, Maine Maritime, MIT, Merchant Marine, Norwich, and Springfield. They also played four non-conference games: the three originally scheduled being Worcester State of the Massachusetts State Collegiate Athletic Conference (MASCAC), RPI of the Liberty League, and Husson of the Commonwealth Coast Conference (CCC), plus Western Connecticut State (MASCAC) in the New England Bowl series.

| Date | Time | Opponent | Site | Result | Attendance |
|---|---|---|---|---|---|
| September 6 | 7:00 p.m. | Worcester State* | Alumni Stadium; Worcester, MA | W 51–0 | 2,388 |
| September 14 | 2:30 p.m. | No. 19 RPI* | Alumni Stadium; Worcester, MA (rivalry) | W 6–3 | 2,016 |
| September 21 | 1:00 p.m. | at Husson* | Winkin Complex; Bangor, ME | W 31–12 | 500 |
| September 28 | 3:00 p.m. | at Springfield | Stagg Field; Springfield, MA | W 35–21 | 3,020 |
| October 5 | 1:00 p.m. | Maine Maritime^{†} | Alumni Stadium; Worcester, MA | W 51–20 | 1,992 |
| October 13 | 12:00 p.m. | at Catholic University | Cardinal Stadium; Washington, DC | W 52–24 | 2,787 |
| October 26 | 3:05 p.m. | Merchant Marine | Alumni Stadium; Worcester, MA | W 66–13 | 1,269 |
| November 2 | 12:00 p.m. | at MIT | Steinbrenner Stadium; Cambridge, MA | L 22–28 | 1,304 |
| November 9 | 12:00 p.m. | Coast Guard | Alumni Stadium; Worcester, MA | W 54–7 | 1,101 |
| November 16 | 12:00 p.m. | at Norwich | Sabine Field; Northfield, VT | W 70–28 | 406 |
| November 23 | 1:00 p.m. | Western Connecticut* | Alumni Stadium; Worcester, MA (New England Bowl) | W 35–6 | 1,304 |
*Non-conference game; ^{†}Homecoming; Rankings from D3football.com Poll released prior to the game; All times are in Eastern time

- On August 26, the Engineers tied for third in the 2019 NEWMAC Preseason Coaches' Poll.

== Personnel ==
=== Coaching staff ===
| Name | Position | Joined staff |
|---|---|---|
| Chris Robertson | Head coach | 2010 |
| Matt Kelly | Offensive coordinator | 2014 |
| Scott Sperone | Defensive coordinator | 2017 |
| Mike Kelly | offensive line | 2017 |
| Galen Holmes | Defensive line / special teams coordinator | 2007 |
| Dan Ross | Running Backs | 2016 |
| Mark Fosatti | Outside Linebackers | 2019 |
| Tim Farina | Wide receivers | 2019 |

== Awards and honors ==
=== Weekly awards ===
NEWMAC Football Offensive Athlete of the Week

- Sean McAllen, RB – Week Ending September 22, 2019
- Connor Field, RB – Week Ending September 29, 2019
- Sean McAllen, RB – Week Ending October 6, 2019
- Julian Nyland, QB – Week Ending October 27, 2019

NEWMAC Football Defensive Athlete of the Week

- Zack Ahrens, DB – Week Ending September 15, 2019
- Nick Ostrowski, LB – Week Ending September 22, 2019
- Sam Casey, DB – Week Ending September 29, 2019

NEWMAC Football Special Teams Athlete of the Week

- Bryce Wade, K/P – Week Ending September 15, 2019
- Bryce Wade, K/P – Week Ending September 29, 2019
- Bryce Wade, K/P – Week Ending October 6, 2019
- Bryce Wade, K/P – Week Ending October 27, 2019

D3football.com Team of the Week

- Sam Casey, S – Week 4
- Isaac Patry, Peter Rakauskas, Vince Lucca, Jordan Hartley, & Sullivan Boyd, OL – Week 8

=== Postseason awards ===
New England Football Writers Division II/III Coach of the Year

- Chris Robertson, HC

New England Football Writers Division II/III All-New England Team

- Sean McAllen, RB
- Vince Lucca, OL

NEWMAC Offensive Athlete of the Year

- Sean McAllen, RB

NEWMAC Defensive Athlete of the Year

- Sam Casey, DB

NEWMAC All-Conference First Team

- Julian Nyland, QB
- Sean McAllen, RB
- Connor Field, RB
- Vince Lucca, OL
- Isaac Patry, OL
- Sam Casey, DB
- Nick Ostrowski, LB
- Lou Duh, DL
- Mike McGoff, DL

NEWMAC All Conference Second Team

- Nic Rossi, WR
- Peter Rakauskas, OL
- Jordan Hartley, OL
- Steve Mey, DB
- Adam Klosner, DB
- Zack Ahrens, LB
- Bryce Wade, P/K
- Austin Pesce, R

NEWMAC All-Sportsmanship Team

- Steve Mey, DB

D3football.com All-East Region First Team

- Sean McAllen, RB

D3football.com All-East Region Second Team

- Sam Casey, DB

D3football.com All-East Region Third Team

- Nick Ostrowski, LB

CoSIDA Academic All-American Football Second Team (DIII)

- Lou Duh, DL

CoSIDA Academic All-District Football Team (DIII)

- Julian Nyland, QB
- Sean McAllen, RB
- Clark Ewen, WR
- Lou Duh, DL
- Nick Ostrowski, LB
