= List of WPI Engineers head football coaches =

The WPI Engineers college football team represents Worcester Polytechnic Institute (WPI) in the New England Women's and Men's Athletic Conference (NEWMAC). The Engineers compete as part of the NCAA Division III. The program has had 11 head coaches since it began play during the 1887 season. Since April 2010, Chris Robertson has served as head coach at WPI.

== Key ==
Key to symbols in coaches list
General		Overall		Conference		Postseason (Note: Although the first Rose Bowl Game was played in 1902, it has been continuously played since the 1916 game, and is recognized as the oldest bowl game by the NCAA. "—" indicates any season prior to 1916 when postseason games were not played.)	
No.	Order of coaches (Note: A running total of the number of head coaches, with coaches who served separate tenures being counted only once. Interim head coaches are represented with "Int" and are not counted in the running total. "—" indicates the team played but either without a coach or no coach is on record. "X" indicates an interim year without play.)	GC	Games coached	CW	Conference wins	PW	Postseason wins
DC	Division championships	OW	Overall wins	CL	Conference losses	PL	Postseason losses
CC	Conference championships	OL	Overall losses	CT	Conference ties	PT	Postseason ties
NC	National championships	OT	Overall ties (Note: Overtime rules in college football were introduced in 1996, making ties impossible in the period since.)	C%	Conference winning percentage		
†	Elected to the College Football Hall of Fame	O%	Overall winning percentage (Note: When computing the win–loss percentage, a tie counts as half a win and half a loss.)				

== Coaches ==
List of head football coaches showing season(s) coached, overall records, conference records, postseason records, championships and selected awards (Note: Statistics correct as of the end of the 2025 NCAA Division III football season.)
No.	Name (Note: The head coach is unknown for the 1887–1888, 1910, 1912, and 1914 seasons.)	Season(s) (Note: WPI did not field teams for the 1889–1890 and 1891–1908 seasons.)	GC	OW	OL	OT	O%	CW	CL	CT	C%	PW	PL	PT	CC	NC	Awards
1; 3	James C. Donnelly	1909; 1911; 1915	25	7	16	2	0.320	—	—	—	—	—	—	—	—	—	—
2	Charley Donnelly	1913	7	0	7	0	.000	—	—	—	—	—	—	—	—	—	—
4	Fordyce T. Blake	1916–1922	48	5	40	3	0.135	—	—	—	—	—	—	—	—	—	—
5	Ivan Bigler	1923–1940	114	42	62	10	0.412	—	—	—	—	—	—	—	—	—	—
6	Paul Stagg	1941–1946	31	6	23	2	0.226	—	—	—	—	—	—	—	—	—	—
7	Robert W. Pritchard	1947–1966	135	60	73	2	0.452	—	—	—	—	—	—	—	—	—	—
8	Mel Massucco	1967–1977	86	25	60	1	0.297	—	—	—	—	—	—	—	—	—	—
9	Bob Weiss	1978–1987	80	45	30	0	0.600	—	—	—	—	—	—	—	—	—	—
10	Jack Siedlecki	1988–1992	48	36	11	1	0.760	5	0	0	1.000	—	—	—	1	—	—
11	Kevin Morris	1993–1998	58	24	32	0	0.429	16	18	0	0.471	—	—	—	1	—	—
12	Ed Zaloom	1999–2009	107	47	60	—	0.439	23	48	—	0.324	—	—	—	0	—	—
13	Chris Robertson	2010–present	153	71	82	—	0.464	41	60	—	0.406	2	1	0	0	—	—
