= 2017 WPI Engineers football team =

American college football season

2017 WPI Engineers football
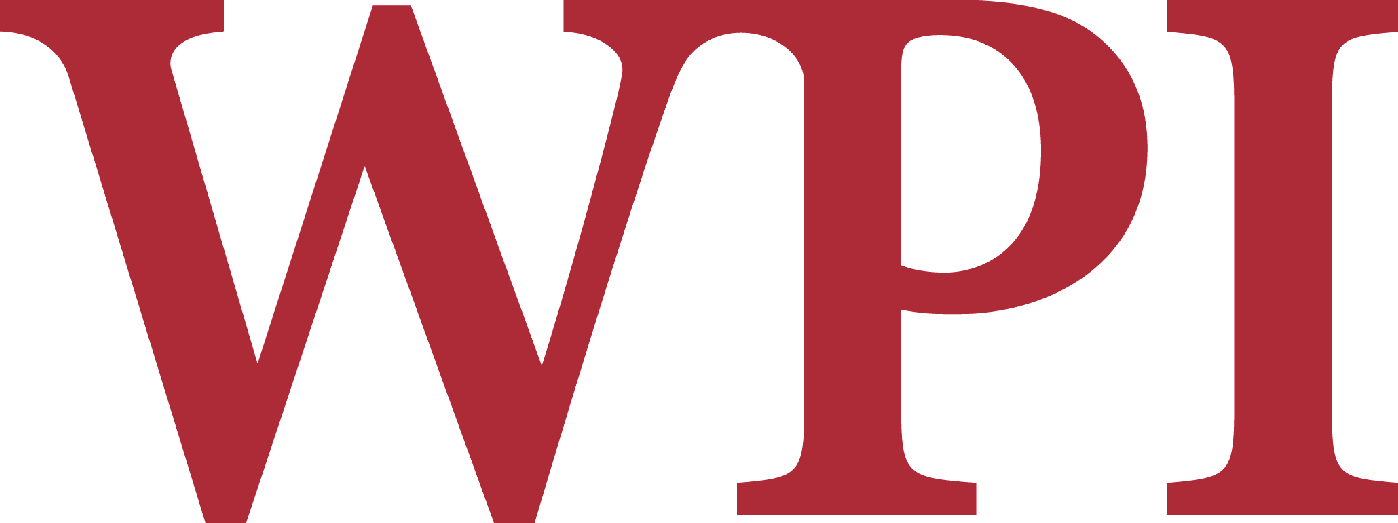

New England Bowl, W 17–3 vs Maritime
- Conference: New England Women's and Men's Athletic Conference
- Record: 9–2 (6–1 NEWMAC)
- Head coach: Chris Robertson (8th season)
- Offensive coordinator: Matt Kelly (1st season)
- Defensive coordinator: Scott Sperone (1st season)
- Captains: Lou Garcia; Derek Pacheco; Black Rice; Brendan Hart; Sam Malafronte
- Home stadium: Alumni Stadium

2017 New England Women's and Men's Athletic Conference football standings
| | Conf. | | | Overall |
| Team | W | | L | W | | L |
|---|---|---|---|---|---|---|
| Springfield $^ | 7 | – | 0 | 10 | – | 1 |
| WPI | 6 | – | 1 | 9 | – | 2 |
| MIT | 5 | – | 2 | 7 | – | 3 |
| Merchant Marine | 4 | – | 3 | 6 | – | 4 |
| Catholic University | 3 | – | 4 | 5 | – | 5 |
| Coast Guard | 1 | – | 6 | 3 | – | 7 |
| Maine Maritime | 1 | – | 6 | 1 | – | 8 |
| Norwich | 1 | – | 6 | 1 | – | 9 |
$ – Conference champion; ^ – NCAA Division III playoff participant

The 2017 WPI Engineers football team represented Worcester Polytechnic Institute in the 2017 NCAA Division III football season. It marked the Engineers' 128th overall season. The team played its home games at Alumni Stadium in Worcester, Massachusetts. They were led by eighth-year head coach Chris Robertson. This was the first season that WPI competed in the New England Women's and Men's Athletic Conference (NEWMAC) for football.

The Engineers finished the regular season with eight victories and two losses. The eight wins is the second most in school history (the Engineers posted nine wins in 1992), tying the 1983, 1989, and 1990 seasons. WPI was selected to host the New England Bowl, making it their third postseason appearance in school history. The Engineers defeated Maritime 17–3 to win their first bowl game in school history.

== Personnel ==
=== Coaching staff ===
| Name | Position | Joined staff |
|---|---|---|
| Chris Robertson | Head coach | 2010 |
| Matt Kelly | Offensive coordinator | 2014 |
| Scott Sperone | Defensive coordinator | 2017 |
| Brian Wehler | offensive line | 2016 |
| Galen Holmes | Defensive line / special teams coordinator | 2007 |
| Dan Ross | Running Backs | 2016 |
| Zach Besaw | Outside Linebackers | 2016 |
| Kyle Bernard | Wide receivers | 2017 |
| Howard Bradley | Assistant Defensive Backs | 2017 |
| Mike Kelly | Assistant offensive line | 2017 |
| Brian Murtagh | Defensive Assistant | 2017 |

=== Roster ===
2017 WPI Engineers Roster
| Quarterback: 3 Chris Hartford – Freshman; 10 Stuart Campbell – Sophomore; 12 Blake Rice – Senior; 14 Jack Hughes – Sophomore; 16 Eric Cosmopulos – Senior; 20 Julian Nyland – Sophomore; Running Back: 4 Sean McAllen – Sophomore; 7 Connor Field – Sophomore; 26 Zach Uglevich – Sophomore; 35 Jackson Brandin – Sophomore; 42 Stephen Peterson – Sophomore; 44 Connor Sakowich – Junior; 48 Lain Zembek – Junior; Fullback: 45 Greg Stanton – Sophomore; Receiver: 3 Alex Domond – Junior; 5 Mike Montano – Sophomore; 8 Spencer Hoagland – Freshman; 10 Jake Vanscoy – Freshman; 11 Mitjon Celaj – Senior; 13 William Kopellas – Sophomore; 15 Matt Nicholson – Junior; 21 Clark Ewen – Sophomore; 22 Romelle Jack – Junior; 23 Ben Emrick – Sophomore; 24 Skip Scott – Freshman; 25 Nate Grunbeck – Sophomore; 28 Tristan Carlton – Junior; 30 Corey Coogan – Senior; 39 Justin Coppolino – Senior; 80 Brendan Chipman – Sophomore; 81 Eric Fryer – Junior; 82 Billy Mitchell – Sophomore; 83 Zach Bellion – Junior; 85 Matt Bressette – Sophomore; 86 Nic Rossi – Sophomore; 88 Austin Pesce – Sophomore; Tight End: 19 Jacob Steinman – Freshman; 31 Marcus Pritchard – Junior; 87 Keeghan O'Leary – Junior | Offensive Lineman: 53 Connor Murphy – Sophomore; 56 Steven Dentato – Sophomore; 60 Kevin Moore – Freshman; 61 Ryan Michaud – Freshman; 62 Brendan Harty – Senior; 63 Anthony Wilkens – Senior; 65 Nick Day – Junior; 66 Reid Bailey – Sophomroe; 67 Paul DeMarco – Senior; 68 James Bonner – Sophomore; 69 Vince Lucca – Sophomore; 70 Peter Rakauskas – Sophomore; 71 Isaac Patry – Sophomore; 72 Troy Sullivan – Sophomore; 76 TJ Cooper – Freshman; 77 Jordan Hartely – Sophomore; 78 Sullivan Boyd – Freshman; Defensive Lineman: 48 Diego Gonzalez Villalobos – Freshman; 52 Max Murphy – Sophomore; 56 Matt Finn - Freshman; 75 Joe Kerkach – Sophomore; 79 Michael Laks – Freshman; 89 Tommy Feraco – Freshman; 90 Jack Gerulskis – Freshman; 92 Mike McGoff – Sophomore; 94 Dereck Pacheco – Senior; 95 Nabeel Tokatli – Senior; 97 Lou Duh – Freshman; 98 Brandon Malarney – Sophomore; 99 Luca Cerasani – Junior | Linebacker: 1 Blayne Merchant – Junior; 9 Larry Cafaro – Junior; 18 Nick Samuelson – Sophomore; 28 Zach Sasso – Freshman; 32 Mason Ocasio – Freshman; 34 Dan Hoag – Sophomore; 36 Michael Bahnan – Senior; 40 Francis Lubega – Junior; 41 Tim Bill – Senior; 46 Isaac Stilwell – Freshman; 47 Anthony Fusco – Sophomore; 50 Sam Malafronte – Junior; 51 Nick Ostrowski – Sophomore; 54 Carter McLellan – Sophomore; 55 Caleb Holmberg – Sophomore; 57 Brent Whitlock – Sophomore; 58 Greg Kaleshian – Freshman; 59 Stephen Lauro – Sophomore; 60 Jim Zickl – Freshman; 74 Sean Dandeneau – Freshman; 93 Matthew Elliott – Sophomore; Defensive Back: 2 Kyle Havey – Junior; 5 Adam Klosner – Freshman; 6 Collin Saunders – Junior; 8 Sam Casey – Sophomore; 10 Jordan Rosenfeld – Freshman; 14 Brian Mahan – Junior; 17 Lou Garcia – Senior; 19 Dominick Timpanaro – Sophomore; 20 Aaron Whitehouse – Freshman; 21 Chris Ferrari - Freshman; 24 Tim McQuade – Sophomore; 26 Hunter Lutte – Freshman; 27 Aaron Hartford - Senior; 29 Zach Ahrens – Sophomore; 33 David Barber - Sophomore; 37 Grant Gilbert – Sophomore; 38 Tim Ryan – Freshman; 43 Steven Mey – Sophomore; 45 Johann Bradley – Freshman; Kicker/Punter: 16 Bruce Wade – Freshman; 84 Spencer Herrington – Junior |

== Schedule ==
The 2017 schedule was officially released on June 29, 2017. WPI faced all seven New England Women's and Men's Athletic Conference (NEWMAC) opponents: Catholic, Coast Guard, Maine Maritime, MIT, Merchant Marine, Norwich, and Springfield. They also scheduled three non-conference games: Anna Maria of the Eastern Collegiate Football Conference (ECFC), Becker of the Commonwealth Coast Conference (CCC), and RPI of the Liberty League.

On November 13, 2017, the Engineers were selected to host Maritime of the Eastern Collegiate Football Conference (ECFC) in the New England Bowl.

| Date | Time | Opponent | Site | Result | Attendance |
|---|---|---|---|---|---|
| September 1 | 7:30 p.m. | Anna Maria* | Alumni Stadium; Worcester, MA | W 48–0 | 2,504 |
| September 9 | 1:00 p.m. | RPI*^{†} | Alumni Stadium; Worcester, MA (Transit Trophy Game) | L 14–36 | 2,645 |
| September 16 | 6:00 p.m. | Becker* | Alumni Stadium; Worcester, MA | W 38–0 | 1,640 |
| September 23 | 2:30 p.m. | at Springfield | Stagg Field; Springfield, MA | L 10–42 | 3,574 |
| September 30 | 12:00 p.m. | Maine Maritime | Alumni Stadium; Worcester, MA | W 45–0 | 694 |
| October 7 | 1:00 p.m. | at Catholic University | Cardinal Stadium; Washington, D.C. | W 31–14 | 1,217 |
| October 21 | 2:30 p.m. | Merchant Marine | Alumni Stadium; Worcester, MA | W 41–7 | 786 |
| October 28 | 12:00 p.m. | at MIT | Henry G. Steinbrenner Stadium; Cambridge, MA | W 24–21 | 1,310 |
| November 4 | 12:00 p.m. | Coast Guard | Alumni Stadium; Worcester, MA | W 44–16 | 1,211 |
| November 11 | 1:00 p.m. | at Norwich | Sabine Field; Northfield, VT | W 42–7 | 1,000 |
| November 18 | 6:00 p.m. | Maritime | Alumni Stadium; Worcester, MA (New England Bowl) | W 17–3 | 1,199 |
*Non-conference game; ^{†}Homecoming; All times are in Eastern time

- On August 29, the Engineers placed third in the inaugural NEWMAC Preseason Coaches Poll

== Awards and honors ==
=== Weekly awards ===
NEWMAC Football Offensive Athlete of the Week

- Blake Rice, QB - Week of October 9, 2017
- Sean McAllen, RB - Week of October 30, 2017

NEWMAC Football Defensive Athlete of the Week

- Dereck Pacheco, DL – Week of September 3, 2017
- Brian Mahan, DB - Week of October 9, 2017
- Nick Ostrowski, LB - Week of October 30, 2017
- Dereck Pacheco, DL – Week of November 6, 2017

NEWMAC Football Special Teams Athlete of the Week

- Spencer Herrington, K/P – Week of September 3, 2017
- Spencer Herrington, K/P – Week of October 23, 2017
- Spencer Herrington, K/P - Week of October 30, 2017
- Spencer Herrington, K/P - Week of November 6, 2017

D3football.com Team of the Week

- Brian Mahan, DB - Week of October 9, 2017

D3football.com Play of the Week

- Lou Garcia, DB - Week of October 9, 2017

=== Postseason awards ===
NEWMAC Special Teams Athlete of the Year

- Spencer Herrington, K/P

NEWMAC All-Conference First Team

- Luca Cerasani, DL
- Corey Coogan, WR
- Lou Garcia, DB
- Brendan Harty, OL
- Spencer Herrington, K/P
- Sean McAllen, RB
- Sam Malafronte, LB
- Dereck Pacheco, DL
- Austin Pesce, PR

NEWMAC All Conference Second Team

- Sam Casey, DB
- Nick Day, OL
- Erik Fyrer, WR
- Nick Ostrowski, LB
- Blake Rice, QB

NEWMAC All-Sportsmanship Team

- Aaron Hartford, DB

D3football.com All-East Region First Team

- Spencer Herrington, K/P

Worcester Area Football Association Co-Offensive Player of the Year

- Sean McAllen, RB

Worcester Area Football Association Steve "Merc" Morris All-Star Team

- Sam Casey, DB
- Luca Cerasani, DL
- Corey Coogan, WR
- Nick Day, OL
- Lou Garcia, DB
- Brendan Harty, OL
- Spencer Herrington, K/P
- Sean McAllen, RB
- Sam Malafronte, LB
- Dereck Pacheco, DL
- Austin Pesce, PR
- Lain Zembek, FB

New England Football Writers Division II/III All-New England Team

- Sean McAllen, RB

CoSIDA Academic All-District Football Team (DIII)

- Nick Day, OL
- Dereck Pacheco, DL
