= 1992 WPI Engineers football team =

American college football season

1992 WPI Engineers football

FFC champion
- Conference: Freedom Football Conference
- Record: 9–2 (5–0 FFC)
- Head coach: Jack Siedlecki (5th season)
- Home stadium: Alumni Stadium

1992 Freedom Football Conference standings
	Conf.					Overall
Team	W		L		T	W		L		T
WPI $^	5	–	0	–	0	9	–	2	–	0
Merchant Marine	4	–	1	–	0	7	–	1	–	1
Plymouth State	4	–	1	–	1	4	–	4	–	1
UMass Lowell	2	–	3	–	1	4	–	4	–	1
Stony Brook	2	–	3	–	0	5	–	5	–	0
Norwich	2	–	4	–	0	3	–	6	–	0
Western Connecticut	2	–	4	–	0	2	–	8	–	0
Coast Guard	1	–	6	–	0	1	–	8	–	0
$ – Conference champion; ^ – NCAA Division III playoff participant

The 1992 WPI Engineers football team represented Worcester Polytechnic Institute in the 1992 NCAA Division III football season. It marked the Engineers' 103rd overall season and the team played its home games in Worcester, Massachusetts. They were led by fifth-year head coach Jack Siedlecki. They were a member of the Freedom Football Conference (FFC). The Engineers finished the season 9–2 and earned the school's first-ever bid to the NCAA Division III Football Championship playoffs.

== Schedule ==
Date	Opponent	Rank	Site	Result	Attendance
September 11	Worcester State*		Alumni Stadium; Worcester, MA	W 56–0	3,208
September 19	Union (NY)*	No. 1	Alumni Stadium; Worcester, MA	L 20–34	3,650
September 26	at UMass Lowell	No. 1	Cawley Memorial Stadium; Lowell, MA	W 13–9	631
October 3	at RPI*	No. 1	'86 Field; Troy, NY (Transit Trophy Game)	W 28–14	1,400
October 10	at Norwich	No. 1	Sabine Field; Northfield, VT	W 56–6	2,467
October 17	at Merchant Marine	No. 1	Kings Point, NY	W 17–15	2,447
October 24	Randolph–Macon*	No. 1	Alumni Stadium; Worcester, MA	W 45–7	812
October 31	at Ursinus*	No. 1	Patterson Field; Collegeville, PA	W 24–10	823
November 7	Coast Guard	No. 1	Alumni Stadium; Worcester, MA	W 28–10	600
November 14	at Plymouth State	No. 1	Plymouth, NH	W 43–20	987
November 21	Rowan*		Glassboro, NJ (NCAA Division III First Round)	L 14–41	
*Non-conference game; Rankings from New England Region poll released prior to the game

== Awards and honors ==
=== Weekly awards ===
Freedom Football Conference Offensive Player of the Week

- Dave Ceppetelli - Week of September 13, 1992

Freedom Football Conference Offensive Player of the Week

- Peter Perivolarakis - Week of September 13, 1992

=== Annual awards ===
Freedom Football Conference Rookie of the Year

- Ernie Ansah
