= Kevin Gilmartin =

American football coach

Current position
- Title: Head coach
- Team: Salve Regina
- Conference: NEWMAC
- Record: 82–41

Playing career

Football
- ?–1994: Williams

Coaching career (HC unless noted)

Football
- c. 1999: Hamilton (assistant)
- 2005–2006: Nipmuc Regional HS (MA)
- 2007–2011: Mount Ida (OC/RB/QB)
- 2012: Salve Regina (OC)
- 2013–present: Salve Regina

Lacrosse
- 1997–2000: Hamilton

Head coaching record
- Overall: 82–41 (college football); 14–41 (college lacrosse)
- Bowls: 3–3

Kevin Gilmartin is an American college football coach. He is the head football coach for Salve Regina University, a position he has held since 2013. Gilmartin was the offensive coordinator at Salve Regina in 2012 under head coach Bob Chesney before Chesney departed to become the head football coach at Assumption College.

== Head coaching record ==
=== College football ===
Year	Team	Overall	Conference	Standing	Bowl/playoffs
Salve Regina Seahawks (New England Football Conference) (2013–2016)
2013	Salve Regina	7–4	6–1	2nd	L Northeast
2014	Salve Regina	7–4	5–2	T–2nd	W Northeast
2015	Salve Regina	8–2	5–2	T–2nd	W Clayton Chapman
2016	Salve Regina	8–2	6–1	2nd	L New England
Salve Regina Seahawks (Commonwealth Coast Football) (2017–2021)
2017	Salve Regina	6–3	3–2	3rd	
2018	Salve Regina	7–4	5–1	T–1st	L New England
2019	Salve Regina	4–6	3–4	5th	
2020–21	No team—COVID-19				
2021	Salve Regina	8–2	4–2	T–3rd	
Salve Regina Seahawks (Commonwealth Coast Conference) (2022)
2022	Salve Regina	6–4	3–3	T–3rd	
Salve Regina Seahawks (New England Women's and Men's Athletic Conference) (2023–present)
2023	Salve Regina	9–2	6–1	2nd	W New England
2024	Salve Regina	6–4	5–2	T–2nd	
2025	Salve Regina	6–4	3–4	T–5th	
2026	Salve Regina	0–0	0–0		
Salve Regina:		82–41	54–25		
Total:		82–41			
