= Joe Loth =

American football player and coach (born 1967)

Current position
- Title: Head coach
- Team: Southern Connecticut
- Conference: NE-10
- Record: 4–6

Biographical details
- Born: January 17, 1967 (age 59); Painesville, Ohio, U.S.

Playing career
- 1987–1990: Otterbein
- Position: Defensive back

Coaching career (HC unless noted)
- 1991–1992: SMU (GA)
- 1993–1996: Western Connecticut (DC)
- 1997: Capital (DC)
- 1998–1999: Rhode Island (DB)
- 2000–2002: Kean
- 2003–2011: Otterbein
- 2012–2024: Western Connecticut
- 2025–present: Southern Connecticut

Head coaching record
- Overall: 137–115
- Bowls: 2–2
- Tournaments: 0–2 (NCAA D-III playoffs)

Accomplishments and honors

Championships
- 1 MASCAC (2023)

Awards
- 2× OAC Coach of the Year (2005, 2008)

Joseph Loth is an American college football coach. He is the head football coach for Southern Connecticut State University, a position he has held since 2025.

In eight seasons as head football coach for Otterbein University, his previous head coaching job, he compiled a record of 46–35, including a 7–3 (6–3 OAC) record in 2005—the first winning season for Otterbein since 1999 and only the second since 1982. That year they also beat their rival, Capital University, who had qualified for the NCAA Division III playoffs. He has the highest winning percentage in Otterbein history for any coach who has coached at least three seasons. The Cardinals finished second in the OAC in 2009, 8–2 overall and 7–2. In 2008 they went 9–2 overall and 8–1 in the OAC. They advanced to the NCAA Division III Football Playoffs for the first time in school history. Loth was named "OAC Football Coach of the Year" for the second time in his career and was named Ohio Division III Coach of the Year by OhioFootball.Com.

In the summer of 2009, Loth worked with the wide receivers as a guest coach for the Saskatchewan Roughriders, who advanced to the 2009 Grey Cup in the Canadian Football League.

Loth played college football at Otterbein from 1987 to 1990, lettering all four seasons and a starter for three. In his senior season he garnered Ohio Athletic Conference Second Team honors and is still the school's all-time leader in interceptions (13).

== Head coaching record ==
Year	Team	Overall	Conference	Standing	Bowl/playoffs
Kean Cougars (New Jersey Athletic Conference) (2000–2002)
2000	Kean	1–9	0–6	7th	
2001	Kean	2–7	1–5	T–6th	
2002	Kean	4–6	2–4	5th	
Kean:		7–22	3–15		
Otterbein Cardinals (Ohio Athletic Conference) (2003–2011)
2003	Otterbein	3–7	3–6	7th	
2004	Otterbein	4–6	3–6	T–7th	
2005	Otterbein	7–3	6–3	T–4th	
2006	Otterbein	4–6	3–6	T–7th	
2007	Otterbein	5–5	5–4	T–4th	
2008	Otterbein	9–2	8–1	2nd	L NCAA Division III First Round
2009	Otterbein	8–2	7–2	T–2nd	
2010	Otterbein	6–4	5–4	T–4th	
2011	Otterbein	3–7	2–7	T–8th	
Otterbein:		49–42	42–39		
Western Connecticut Colonials (New Jersey Athletic Conference) (2012)
2012	Western Connecticut	1–8	1–7	T–8th	
Western Connecticut Colonials / Wolves (Massachusetts State Collegiate Athletic Conference) (2013–2024)
2013	Western Connecticut	8–2	6–2	2nd	W Northeast
2014	Western Connecticut	7–4	6–2	2nd	L Northeast
2015	Western Connecticut	5–5	4–4	T–4th	
2016	Western Connecticut	5–5	4–4	T–3rd	
2017	Western Connecticut	7–3	5–3	T–3rd	
2018	Western Connecticut	8–2	6–2	T–2nd	
2019	Western Connecticut	8–3	6–2	T–2nd	L New England
2020–21	No team—COVID-19				
2021	Western Connecticut	5–5	4–4	5th	
2022	Western Connecticut	7–3	6–2	T–2nd	
2023	Western Connecticut	7–3	7–1	T–1st	L NCAA Division III First Round
2024	Western Connecticut	9–2	8–1	2nd	W Asa S. Bushnell
Western Connecticut:		77–45	63–34		
Southern Connecticut Owls (Northeast-10 Conference) (2025–present)
2025	Southern Connecticut	4–6	4–3	T–4th	
Southern Connecticut:		4–6	4–3		
Total:		137–115			
National championship Conference title Conference division title or championship game berth
