= Chris Robertson (American football) =

American football coach

Current position
- Title: Head coach
- Team: WPI
- Conference: NEWMAC
- Record: 71–82

Biographical details
- Education: Albany (1996)

Playing career
- 1993–1995: Albany

Coaching career (HC unless noted)
- 1996–1998: Siena (LB/DC)
- 1999–2005: WPI (DC)
- 2006–2009: Salve Regina
- 2010–present: WPI

Head coaching record
- Overall: 82–108
- Bowls: 2–1

Christopher M. Robertson is an American college football coach. He is the head football coach for Worcester Polytechnic Institute, a position he has held since 2010. In 2010, he was named the 18th head coach at the Worcester Polytechnic Institute in Worcester, Massachusetts. In 2019, he was named Division II/III New England Coach of the Year by the New England Football Writers.

A graduate of the Albany Great Danes, Robertson was previously the head coach at Salve Regina University in Newport, Rhode Island from 2006 to 2009.

== Head coaching record ==
Year	Team	Overall	Conference	Standing	Bowl/playoffs
Salve Regina Seahawks (New England Football Conference) (2006–2009)
2006	Salve Regina	1–8	0–7	8th (Boyd)	
2007	Salve Regina	2–7	1–6	T–7th (Boyd)	
2008	Salve Regina	4–5	3–4	T–4th (Boyd)	
2009	Salve Regina	4–6	3–4	T–4th (Boyd)	
Salve Regina:		11–26	7–21		
WPI Engineers (Liberty League) (2010–2016)
2010	WPI	3–7	1–5	7th	
2011	WPI	3–7	1–5	7th	
2012	WPI	2–8	1–6	7th	
2013	WPI	3–7	2–5	T–6th	
2014	WPI	4–6	3–4	T–4th	
2015	WPI	7–4	4–3	4th	L Presidents
2016	WPI	6–4	3–4	T–5th	
WPI Engineers (New England Women's and Men's Athletic Conference) (2017–present)
2017	WPI	9–2	6–1	2nd	W New England
2018	WPI	6–4	4–3	5th	
2019	WPI	10–1	6–1	T–1st	W New England
2020–21	No team—COVID-19				
2021	WPI	3–7	2–4	5th	
2022	WPI	4–6	2–4	T–4th	
2023	WPI	3–7	1–6	7th	
2024	WPI	6–4	4–3	4th	
2025	WPI	2–8	1–6	7th	
2026	WPI	0–0	0–0		
WPI:		71–82	41–60		
Total:		82–108			
National championship Conference title Conference division title or championship game berth
