= 2015 WPI Engineers football team =

American college football season

2015 WPI Engineers football
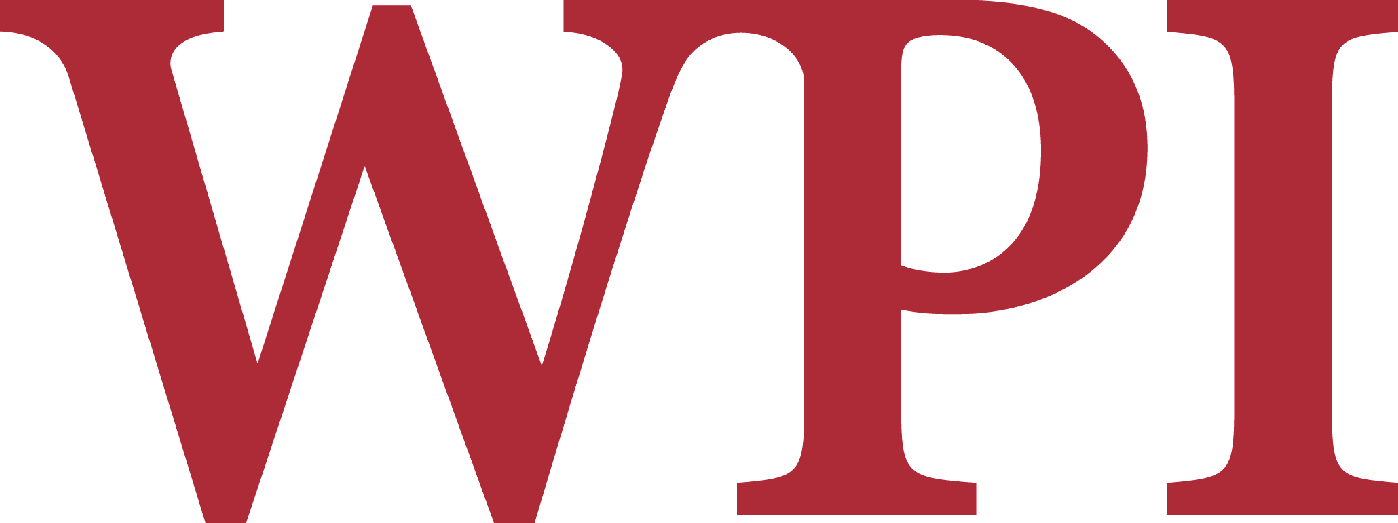
- Conference: Liberty League
- Record: 7–4 (4–3 Liberty)
- Head coach: Chris Robertson (6th season)
- Offensive coordinator: Neil Hitchen (2nd season)
- Defensive coordinator: Dan Mulrooney (2nd season)
- Captains: Jake Brown; Eric Lacroix<; Sean Murphy; Brandon Eccher; Brian Murtagh
- Home stadium: Alumni Stadium

2015 Liberty League football standings
	Conf.			Overall
Team	W		L	W		L
RPI +	6	–	1	9	–	2
St. Lawrence +^	6	–	1	8	–	3
Hobart	5	–	2	7	–	3
WPI	4	–	3	7	–	4
Rochester (NY)	3	–	4	5	–	4
Springfield	2	–	5	4	–	6
Merchant Marine	2	–	5	3	–	6
Union (NY)	0	–	7	0	–	10
+ – Conference co-champions; ^ – NCAA Division III playoff participant

The 2015 WPI Engineers football team represented Worcester Polytechnic Institute in the 2015 NCAA Division III football season. It marked the Engineers' 126th overall season and the team played its home games at Alumni Stadium in Worcester, Massachusetts. They were led by sixth year head coach Chris Robertson. They were a member of the Liberty League.

The Engineers finished the season with a winning record of 7-4.

== Schedule ==
The 2015 schedule was officially released on June 22, 2015. WPI will face all seven Liberty League opponents: RPI, Hobart, Union, Merchant Marine, St. Lawrence, Rochester, and Springfield. They are also scheduled to play four non-conference games: MIT of the New England Football Conference (NEFC), Worcester State of the Massachusetts State Collegiate Athletic Conference (MSCAC), and Norwich of the NEFC.

Date	Time	Opponent	Site	TV	Result	Attendance
September 4	7:00 p.m.	MIT*	Alumni Stadium; Worcester, Massachusetts		W 31-28	3,403
September 11	7:00 p.m.	at Worcester State*	Coughlin Stadium; Worcester, Massachusetts		W 27-13	1,489
September 19	1:00 p.m.	Norwich*	Alumni Stadium; Worcester, Massachusetts	Charter TV3	W 27-10	2,235
September 26	1:00 p.m.	RPI^{†}	Alumni Stadium; Worcester, Massachusetts (Transit Trophy Game)		L 21-28	2,889
October 3	1:00 p.m.	at No. 25 Hobart	Boswell Field; Geneva, New York		L 7-37	
October 10	1:30 p.m.	at Union	Frank Bailey Field; Schenectady, New York		W 29-21	2,103
October 23	7:00 p.m.	Merchant Marine	Alumni Stadium; Worcester, Massachusetts		W 38-8	900
October 31	1:00 p.m.	at St. Lawrence	Leckonby Stadium; Canton, New York		L 21-42	800
November 7	12:00 p.m.	Rochester	Alumni Stadium; Worcester, Massachusetts		W 35-34	1,294
November 14	12:00 p.m.	at Springfield	Stagg Field; Springfield, Massachusetts		W 19-17	1,020
November 27	8:10 p.m.	vs. Kean	Arute Field; New Britain, Connecticut (ECAC President's Bowl)		L 6-24	850
*Non-conference game; ^{†}Homecoming; Rankings from D3football.com Poll released prior to game Poll released prior to the game; All times are in Eastern time
