= Chris Rippon =

American football coach (born 1960)

Biographical details
- Born: September 20, 1960 (age 66); Yonkers, New York, U.S.
- Education: Southern Connecticut State University (1982); Western Connecticut State University (1985)

Playing career
- 1978–1981: Southern Connecticut

Coaching career (HC unless noted)
- 1982–1983: Western Connecticut (GA)
- 1984–1986: Western Connecticut (DC)
- 1987–1989: Western Connecticut
- 1990–1992: Boston University (DC)
- 1993: Syracuse (LB)
- 1994: Syracuse (DE)
- 1995–1998: Syracuse (ST/LB)
- 1999–2003: Syracuse (DC)
- 2004: Syracuse (AHC/ST)
- 2005–2007: Ole Miss (ST/DB)
- 2008: Rutgers (ST)
- 2010–2012: Marshall (DC/LB)
- 2013–2014: Columbia (DC/LB)
- 2015–2019: Ole Miss (ST)
- 2021: Edmonton Elks (ST)
- 2022: Hobart (ST)

Head coaching record
- Overall: 6–23–1

Christopher Rippon (born September 20, 1960) is an American college football coach. He was most recently the special teams coordinator for Hobart and William Smith Colleges in 2022. He was the head football coach for Western Connecticut State University from 1987 to 1989. He also coached for Boston University, Syracuse, Ole Miss, Rutgers, Marshall, Columbia, and the Edmonton Elks of the Canadian Football League (CFL). He played college football for Southern Connecticut.

== Coaching career ==
=== Western Connecticut ===
Rippon played college football for Southern Connecticut and after graduation he became a graduate assistant for Western Connecticut. From 1982 to 1983 he held that position until being named defensive coordinator under head coach Paul Pasqualoni. During his second season with the team he helped lead them to a New England Football Conference championship in 1985. After Pasqualoni left for Syracuse, Rippon was promoted to head football coach for the 1986 season. In three seasons with the team he led them to a 6–23–1 record overall. He had his best season in 1988 when he led the team to a 3–7 record.

=== Boston University ===
Following the 1989 season, Rippon joined Boston University as the team's defensive coordinator. He stayed with the team until 1992.

=== Syracuse ===
In 1993, Rippon rejoined Pasqualoni; this time at Syracuse. Rippon took the position of linebackers coach in 1993 before becoming the team's defensive ends coach in 1994. In 1995 he was promoted to special teams coordinator and linebackers coach. From 1995 to 1998 he helped lead the team to three consecutive Big East championships from 1996 to 1998. He helped three Orange wide receivers reach All-Big East conference selections in Marvin Harrison, Quinton Spotwood, and Kevin Johnson. In 1999, Rippon was promoted to the team's defensive coordinator. In 1999 he led a top-15 defense and in 2000 he also lead a top-25 defense. In 2001, his defense garnered 40 quarterback sacks—which was the second-most in school history—while also having the most takeaways during Pasqualoni tenure. In 2004, Rippon was named assistant head coach and returned to his role as special teams coordinator.

=== Ole Miss ===
In 2005, Rippon was hired by Ole Miss to be the team's special teams coordinator and defensive backs coach under Ed Orgeron. He held the position until 2007.

=== Rutgers ===
Rippon spent the 2008 season as Rutgers' special teams coordinator. He helped lead the team to a win in the 2008 PapaJohns.com Bowl over NC State. He was relieved of his position prior to the start of the 2009 season. Robb Smith replaced him.

=== Marshall ===
In 2010, Rippon joined Marshall as the team's defensive coordinator and linebackers coach. In 2011, Rippon helped lead the Thundering Herd to a 7–6 record including a win over FIU in the 2011 Beef 'O' Brady's Bowl. He helped coach two NFL draft picks: defensive linemen Vinny Curry and safety Omar Brown. He held his positions until 2012.

=== Columbia ===
In 2013, Rippon was hired by Columbia to be the team's defensive coordinator and linebackers coach. Following two winless campaigns he became interim head coach for the first two months of 2015 following the firing of Pete Mangurian.

=== Ole Miss (second stint) ===
After being named interim head coach for the Lions in 2015 he took a position as the special teams coordinator for his second stint at Ole Miss. He stayed with the Rebels until 2019.

=== Edmonton Elks ===
In 2021, Rippon was hired by the Edmonton Elks of the Canadian Football League (CFL) to be the team's special teams coordinator. He was fired on August 20, 2021.

=== Hobart ===
In 2022, Rippon rejoined the college football ranks and was hired by Hobart as the team's special teams coordinator.

== Head coaching record ==
Year	Team	Overall	Conference	Standing	Bowl/playoffs
Western Connecticut Colonials (NCAA Division III independent) (1987–1989)
1987	Western Connecticut	1–8–1			
1988	Western Connecticut	3–7			
1989	Western Connecticut	2–8			
Western Connecticut:		6–23–1			
Total:		6–23–1			

== Personal life ==
Rippon created Coach Rip Consulting, LLC. to help kickers, punters, longsnappers, and other special teams players with recruitment.
