= Jack Siedlecki =

American football player and coach (born 1951)

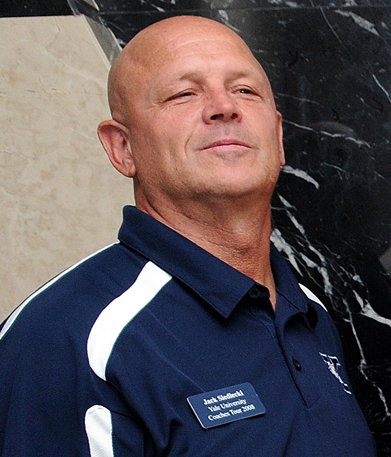
- Siedlecki in 2008

Biographical details
- Born: July 23, 1951 (age 75); Johnstown, New York, U.S.

Playing career
- 1972–1973: Union (NY)
- Positions: Running back, linebacker

Coaching career (HC unless noted)
- 1976–1979: Albany (assistant)
- 1980: Wagner (assistant)
- 1981–1987: Lafayette (assistant)
- 1988–1992: WPI
- 1993–1996: Amherst
- 1997–2008: Yale
- 2010–2014: Wesleyan (OC/QB)
- 2016: Holy Cross (TE)

Head coaching record
- Overall: 126-70–2
- Tournaments: 0–1 (NCAA D-III playoffs)

Accomplishments and honors

Championships
- 1 FFC (1992); 2 Ivy (1999, 2006)

Jack "Sid" Siedlecki (pronounced /sɪdˈlɛki/ sid-LEK-ee; born July 23, 1951) is an American former college football coach. He was a head coach in college football for 21 years for Worcester Polytechnic Institute (1988–1992), Amherst College (1993–1996) and Yale University (1997–2008). He led his teams to championships in the Ivy League (Yale in 1999 and 2006), the Freedom Football Conference (Worcester Tech in 1992), and the New England Small College Athletic Conference (Amherst in 1996). He was selected as the American Football Coaches Association District I Coach of the Year after the 2006 season.

== Early years ==
Siedlecki was born in 1951 in Johnstown, New York. His father, John Siedlecki, was the son of Polish immigrants and served as the head football coach at Johnstown High School for 20 years and later served as the school's principal.

Jack was the youngest boy in the Siedlecki family and became a three-sport star at Johnstown High School, playing tailback on the football team, pitcher on the baseball team and point guard on the basketball team. Siedleck's high school basketball coach later recalled that Siedlecki was not a good shooter, but had great vision as the team's point guard: "He could see things unfold before they happened. Some people are born with that ability to see things. Jack was." The same coach recalled Siedlecki's performance as tailback in a game against future World Football League linebacker Ted Jornov:

"Jack kept taking these unmerciful poundings from Jornov. He would carry the ball for five yards and Jornov would crunch him. But he'd get up, every time. He must have carried the ball 25 times. That night, Jack Siedlecki showed me what kind of guy he is. He took a physical beating, but he just kept getting up. It was remarkable. ... We won because of Jack. He was the heart and soul of the team."

He next attended Union College in Schenectady, New York, where he received a Bachelor of Arts degree in history in 1974. He played at the running back and linebacker positions for the Union College football team and also played as a pitcher for the school's baseball team.

== Assistant football coach ==
After graduating from Union College, Siedlecki worked as an assistant football coach for 12 years at the University of Albany (1976–1979), Wagner College (1980), and Lafayette College (1981–1987). He began his coaching career as a graduate assistant at Albany and later noted that his responsibilities there were unlike any other program: "Everybody who walks out of here is exposed to what it takes to be a college coach." He recalled that the assistants at Albany earned $2,500 to $3,000 a year, and five coaches shared one house for which they paid $225 per month in rent. To support himself, Siedlecki also taught at a local Catholic elementary school, worked as a building supervisor three nights a week and coached junior varsity baseball. After one year at Wagner, Siedlecki spent seven years at Lafayette and served as both defensive and offensive coordinator. Siedlecki and Harvard head coach Tim Murphy were roommates as assistant coaches at Lafayette.

== WPI ==
In January 1988, Siedlecki was hired as the head football coach at Worcester Polytechnic Institute. In five years at Worcester, Siedlecki compiled a 36–11–1 record. His 1990 team went 8–0–1, and his 1992 team compiled a 9–1 record. The 1992 team also made the school's first appearance in the NCAA Division III playoffs and won the inaugural title of the Freedom Football Conference. Siedlecki was chosen as the 1992 AFCA Kodak District I Coach of the Year.

== Amherst ==
In January 1993, Siedleck was hired as the head football coach at Amherst College. At the time, he said that he had "a great deal of pride" in the winning program he had built at Worcester but added, "Personally and professionally this is a great opportunity. Amherst is one of the finest schools in the country and it will truly be an honor to work there."

At Amherst, Siedlecki replaced John McKechnie, who had for the 1992 season succeeded Jim Ostendarp, who had been the head football coach at Amherst for 32 years. Siedlecki inherited a program that had gone 0–8, 0–7–1, and 1–7 in the three years before he was hired. Siedlecki's defensive coordinator at Amherst, E. J. Mills, later recalled the first practice at Amherst:

"Two of the players came over the hill and down onto the field about five seconds after the rest of the team had lined up. Jack just started to shout. He yelled, 'Are you kiddin' me! We're trying to turn this thing around and we've got guys late for practice? We're gonna get it done! We're not gonna tolerate this! No excuses! Hundred-yard sprints! Everybody! Now!' The whole team started running; they ran and ran and ran. They must've done about 25 or 30 sprints in a row. I don't think anybody was ever late after that. Jack Siedlecki's legend at Amherst was established on that first day."

The New York Times reported that "Siedlecki performed miracles at Amherst," turning a program that had won one game in three years into a consistent winner. In four seasons as the head coach of the Amherst Lord Jeffs, Siedlecki compiled a 20–11–1 record. His 1996 team finished with a 7–1 record and won the New England Small College Athletic Conference championship. He was named the American Football Coaches Association District I Coach of the Year after the 2006 season.

== Yale ==
In December 1996, Siedlecki was hired as the 32nd head coach of the Yale Bulldogs football team. He replaced Carm Cozza, the winningest coach in Ivy League football history. Yale's football team had finished 2–8 in 1995 and had not had a winning season since 1991 when Siedlecki took over. Siedlecki noted, "I've been at good academic schools. I want to be with the best student athletes. It's fun to coach guys who have that kind of intellect. I like those kinds of guys." At the news conference announcing his hiring, Siedlecki responded to questions suggesting he had been a second choice to Dick Jauron:

"Whenever jobs like this open, very good people get involved. I feel tremendously important to be standing here today. Maybe I'm the last guy standing I don't care. I'm the new head coach at Yale."

In his first three years as Yale's head coach, Siedlecki turned the program around from a 1–9 record in 1997 to 9–1 and a share of the Ivy League championship in 1999. Siedlecki was named the New England Sports Writer's 1999 Coach of the Year for leading the school's turnaround in football.

In September 2000, Yale became the first college football team to win 800 games. In Siedlecki's 12 years at Yale, his players have been selected as first team All-Ivy League players on 34 occasions.

In 2006, he led Yale to a share of the Ivy League championship after finishing 8–2 (6–1 in conference games); the 2006 team defeated Harvard by a score of 34–13. In 2007, he led Yale to a 9–1 record and was named 2007 New England Coach of the Year by sports writers.

At the end of November 2008, less than a week after a 10–0 loss against Harvard and a 6–4 season record, and amid criticism from students and alumni, Siedlecki announced his retirement from coaching after 12 years at Yale. Siedlecki, who agreed to remain at Yale as an assistant athletic director, said at the time, "In my 12 years at Yale I feel I have always tried to do what is best for Yale football and the student-athletes that our staff has brought here. I feel this is what is best for Yale football at this time." Siedlecki compiled a 70-49 record as Yale's head football coach.

== Wesleyan ==
In the summer of 2010, Siedlecki decided to come out of retirement to become the offensive coordinator and quarterbacks coach at Wesleyan University. He stated, "It’s an ideal coaching job at this stage of my career. It’s Division III, it’s a really idyllic place, and it’s going to be a big challenge. They haven’t won the Little Three in 40 years."

== Personal life ==
Siedlecki and his wife, Nancy, have three children: Kevin, Jackie, and Amy. Siedlecki's wife once told a reporter that her husband had an "obsession" with football, and Siedlecki did not disagree. He noted, "I'm basically football and family; those are about the only things in my life. I love the game. I love coaching."

== Head coaching record ==
Year	Team	Overall	Conference	Standing	Bowl/playoffs
WPI Engineers (NCAA Division III independent) (1988–1991)
1988	WPI	4–4			
1989	WPI	8–2			
1990	WPI	8–0–1			
1991	WPI	7–3			
WPI Engineers (Freedom Football Conference) (1992)
1992	WPI	9–2	5–0	1st	L NCAA Division III First Round
WPI:		36–11–1	5–0		
Amherst Lord Jeffs (New England Small College Athletic Conference) (1993–1996)
1993	Amherst	3–5	3–5	7th	
1994	Amherst	5–3	5–3	T–4th	
1995	Amherst	5–2–1	5–2–1	3rd	
1996	Amherst	7–1	7–1	T–1st	
Amherst:		20–11–1	20–11–1		
Yale Bulldogs (Ivy League) (1997–2008)
1997	Yale	2–8	1–6	7th	
1998	Yale	6–4	5–2	T–2nd	
1999	Yale	9–1	6–1	T–1st	
2000	Yale	7–3	4–3	T–3rd	
2001	Yale	3–6	1–6	T–7th	
2002	Yale	6–4	4–3	T–3rd	
2003	Yale	6–4	4–3	T–2nd	
2004	Yale	5–5	3–4	T–4th	
2005	Yale	4–6	4–3	T–4th	
2006	Yale	8–2	6–1	T–1st	
2007	Yale	9–1	6–1	2nd	
2008	Yale	6–4	4–3	4th	
Yale:		71–48	48–36		
Total:		127–70–2			
National championship Conference title Conference division title or championship game berth
