= Western Connecticut Wolves football =

College football team

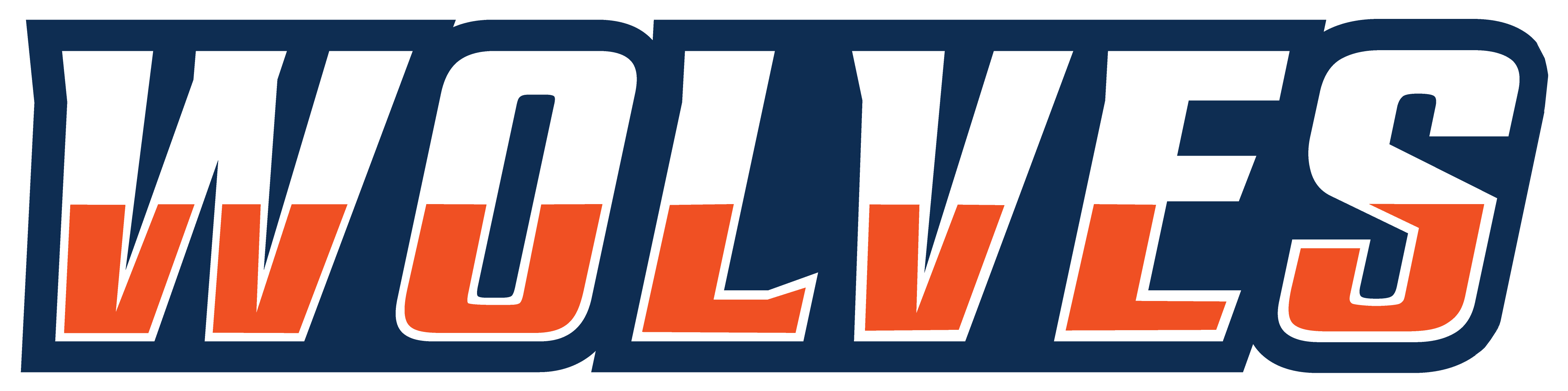
- First season: 1969; 57 years ago
- Athletic director: Lori Mazza
- Head coach: Kevin Jones (interim); 1st season, 0–0 (–)
- Location: Danbury, Connecticut
- Stadium: The WAC (capacity: 4,500)
- NCAA division: Division III
- Conference: Landmark
- Colors: Deep blue and Starbust orange
- All-time record: 230–282–4 (.450)
- Bowl record: 4–2 (.667)

Conference championships
- 4
- Rivalries: Framingham State
- Mascot: Wolves
- Website: westconnathletics.com

The Western Connecticut Wolves football (often stylized as WestConn) team represents Western Connecticut State University in college football at the NCAA Division III level. The Wolves are members of the Landmark Conference, fielding its team in the Landmark Conference since 2025. The Wolves play their home games at the WAC in Danbury, Connecticut. The team was previously known as the Western Connecticut Colonials and Western Connecticut Indians.

Their head coach is Kevin Jones, who took over the position for the 2025 season.

== History ==
Western Connecticut State College, now known as Western Connecticut State University, established its college football team in 1969, initially named the Western Connecticut Indians. The team's first head coach was Jim Krayeske, who guided them to a 2–2–1 record during their debut season in the Freedom Football League. In recognition of his contributions, Krayeske was inducted into the WestConn Hall of Fame in 2013. The team held their inaugural home game on October 25, 1969, at Osborne Street Field, where they faced New Haven.

== Conference affiliations ==
- NAIA Independent (1970–1976)
- New England Football Conference (1979–1985)
- Division III Independent (1986–1991)
- Freedom Football Conference (1992–2003)
- New Jersey Athletic Conference (2004–2012)
- Massachusetts State Collegiate Athletic Conference (2013–2024)
- Landmark Conference (2025-Present)

== Championships ==
=== Conference championships ===
Western Connecticut claims 4 conference titles, the most recent of which came in 2023.

Year	Conference	Overall Record	Conference Record	Coach
1985†	New England Football Conference	10–2	8–1	Paul Pasqualoni
1999	Freedom Football Conference	10–1	6–0	John Cervino
2001†	Freedom Football Conference	8–2	5–1	Bob Surace
2023†	Massachusetts State Collegiate Athletic Conference	10–2	8–1	Joe Loth

† Co-champions

== Postseason games ==
=== NCAA Division III playoff games ===
The Wolves have made four appearances in the NCAA Division III playoffs, with a combined record of 1–4.

Year	Round	Opponent	Result
1985	First Round	Montclair State	L, 0–28
1999	Second Round	Montclair State	L, 24–32
2001	First Round; Second Round	Westfield State; Rowan	W, 8–7; L, 14–43
2023	First Round	Johns Hopkins	L, 20–62

=== Bowl games ===
Western Connecticut has participated in ten bowl games, and has a record of 4–2.

Season	Coach	Bowl	Opponent	Result
2000	Bob Surace	ECAC Bowl	Nichols	W 63–10
2013	Joe Loth	ECAC Bowl	Salve Regina	W 48–35
2014	Joe Loth	ECAC Bowl	St. John Fisher	L 14–28
2019	Joe Loth	New England Bowl	WPI	L 6–35
2024	Joe Loth	ECAC Bowl	Alfred	W 45–14

== List of head coaches ==
=== Key ===
Key to symbols in coaches list
General		Overall		Conference		Postseason (Note: Although the first Rose Bowl Game was played in 1902, it has been continuously played since the 1916 game, and is recognized as the oldest bowl game by the NCAA. "—" indicates any season prior to 1916 when postseason games were not played.)	
No.	Order of coaches (Note: A running total of the number of head coaches, with coaches who served separate tenures being counted only once. Interim head coaches are represented with "Int" and are not counted in the running total. "—" indicates the team played but either without a coach or no coach is on record. "X" indicates an interim year without play.)	GC	Games coached	CW	Conference wins	PW	Postseason wins
DC	Division championships	OW	Overall wins	CL	Conference losses	PL	Postseason losses
CC	Conference championships	OL	Overall losses	CT	Conference ties	PT	Postseason ties
NC	National championships	OT	Overall ties (Note: Overtime rules in college football were introduced in 1996, making ties impossible in the period since.)	C%	Conference winning percentage		
†	Elected to the College Football Hall of Fame	O%	Overall winning percentage (Note: When computing the win–loss percentage, a tie counts as half a win and half a loss.)				

=== Coaches ===
List of head football coaches showing season(s) coached, overall records, conference records, postseason records, championships and selected awards
No.	Name	Season(s)	GC	OW	OL	OT	O%	CW	CL	CT	C%	PW	PL	PT	DC	CC	NC	Awards
1	Jim Krayeske	1969	5	2	2	1	0.500	–	–	–	–	–	–	–	–	–	–	–
2	Nick Cutulle	1970–1971	8	1	7	0	0.125	–	–	–	–	–	–	–	–	1	–	–
3	Dave Rice	1972–1974	26	9	17	0	0.346	–	–	–	–	–	–	–	–	–	–	–
4	Bill Sferro	1975–1976	16	6	10	0	0.375	–	–	–	–	–	–	–	–	–	–	–
5	Carl Paight	1977–1979	26	3	23	0	0.115	1	8	0	0.111	–	–	–	–	–	–	–
6	Steve Golden	1980–1981	18	1	16	1	0.083	1	15	1	0.088	–	–	–	–	–	–	–
7	Paul Pasqualoni	1982–1986	51	34	17	0	0.667	24	12	0	0.667	0	1	0	–	1	–	–
8	Chris Rippon	1987–1989	30	6	23	1	0.217	–	–	–	–	–	–	–	–	–	–	–
9	Ken Brasington	1990–1991	20	4	16	0	0.200	–	–	–	–	–	–	–	–	–	–	–
10	John Cervino	1992–1999	81	39	41	1	0.488	22	26	0	0.458	1	1	0	–	–	–	–
11	Bob Surace	2000–2001	21	18	3	0	0.857	10	2	0	0.833	2	1	0	–	1	–	–
12	John Burrell	2002–2011	100	37	63	0	0.370	20	54	0	0.270	–	–	–	–	–	–	–
13	Joe Loth	2012–2024	122	77	45	0	0.631	63	34	0	0.649	2	2	0	–	1	–	–
14	Kevin Jones	2025–Present	10	5	5	0	0.500	2	4	0	0.333	–	–	–	–	–	–	–

== Year-by-year results ==
National champions	Conference champions	Bowl game berth	Playoff berth

Season	Year	Head Coach	Association	Division	Conference	Record							Postseason	Final ranking
Season	Year	Head Coach	Association	Division	Conference	Overall			Conference				Postseason	Final ranking
Season	Year	Head Coach	Association	Division	Conference	Win	Loss	Tie	Finish	Win	Loss	Tie	Postseason	Final ranking
Western Connecticut Indians
1969	1969	Jim Krayeske	—	—	FFL	2	2	1	—	—	—	—	—	—
Western Connecticut Colonials
1970	1970	Nick Cutulle	NAIA	Division I	Independent	0	2	0	—	—	—	—	—	—
1971	1971	Nick Cutulle	NAIA	Division I	Independent	1	5	0	—	—	—	—	—	—
1972	1972	Dave Rice	NAIA	Division I	Independent	1	7	0	—	—	—	—	—	—
1973	1973	Dave Rice	NAIA	Division I	Independent	4	5	0	—	—	—	—	—	—
1974	1974	Dave Rice	NAIA	Division I	Independent	4	5	0	—	—	—	—	—	—
1975	1975	Bill Sferro	NAIA	Division I	Independent	2	6	0	—	—	—	—	—	—
1976	1976	Bill Sferro	NAIA	Division I	Independent	4	4	0	—	—	—	—	—	—
1977	1977	Carl Paight	NCAA	Division III	—	2	7	0	—	—	—	—	—	—
1978	1978	Carl Paight	NCAA	Division III	—	0	8	0	—	—	—	—	—	—
1979	1979	Carl Paight	NCAA	Division III	NEFC	1	8	0	10th	1	8	0	—	—
1980	1980	Steve Golden	NCAA	Division III	NEFC	0	8	1	10th	0	8	1	—	—
1981	1981	Steve Golden	NCAA	Division III	NEFC	1	8	0	9th	1	7	0	—	—
1982	1982	Paul Pasqualoni	NCAA	Division III	NEFC	2	7	0	T–8th	2	7	0	—	—
1983	1983	Paul Pasqualoni	NCAA	Division III	NEFC	7	3	0	4th	6	3	0	—	—
1984	1984	Paul Pasqualoni	NCAA	Division III	NEFC	9	1	0	2nd	8	1	0	—	—
1985	1985	Paul Pasqualoni	NCAA	Division III	NEFC	10	2	0	T–1st	8	1	0	L NCAA Division III First Round	—
1986	1986	Paul Pasqualoni	NCAA	Division III	Independent	6	4	0	—	—	—	—	—	—
1987	1987	Chris Rippon	NCAA	Division III	Independent	1	8	1	—	—	—	—	—	—
1988	1988	Chris Rippon	NCAA	Division III	Independent	3	7	0	—	—	—	—	—	—
1989	1989	Chris Rippon	NCAA	Division III	Independent	2	8	0	—	—	—	—	—	—
1990	1990	Ken Brasington	NCAA	Division III	Independent	3	7	0	—	—	—	—	—	—
1991	1991	Ken Brasington	NCAA	Division III	Independent	1	9	0	—	—	—	—	—	—
1992	1992	John Cervino	NCAA	Division III	FFC	2	8	0	T–6th	2	4	0	—	—
1993	1993	John Cervino	NCAA	Division III	FFC	4	6	0	7th	2	4	0	—	—
1994	1994	John Cervino	NCAA	Division III	FFC	1	9	0	7th	1	5	0	—	—
1995	1995	John Cervino	NCAA	Division III	FFC	7	2	1	2nd	4	2	0	—	—
1996	1996	John Cervino	NCAA	Division III	FFC	6	4	0	T–4th	3	3	0	—	—
1997	1997	John Cervino	NCAA	Division III	FFC	4	6	0	T–6th	1	5	0	—	—
1998	1998	John Cervino	NCAA	Division III	FFC	5	5	0	T–4th	3	3	0	—	—
1999	1999	John Cervino	NCAA	Division III	FFC	10	1	0	1st	6	0	0	L NCAA Division III Second Round	14
2000	2000	Bob Surace	NCAA	Division III	FFC	10	1	0	2nd	5	1	0	W ECAC Northeast Bowl	20
2001	2001	Bob Surace	NCAA	Division III	FFC	8	2	0	T–1st	5	1	0	L NCAA Division III Second Round	—
2002	2002	John Burrell	NCAA	Division III	FFC	7	3	0	3rd	4	2	0	—	—
2003	2003	John Burrell	NCAA	Division III	FFC	6	4	0	T–3rd	3	3	0	—	—
2004	2004	John Burrell	NCAA	Division III	NJAC	5	5	0	T–4th	2	4	0	—	—
2005	2005	John Burrell	NCAA	Division III	NJAC	6	4	0	4th	3	3	0	—	—
2006	2006	John Burrell	NCAA	Division III	NJAC	5	5	0	T–5th	2	5	0	—	—
2007	2007	John Burrell	NCAA	Division III	NJAC	4	6	0	T–6th	2	5	0	—	—
2008	2008	John Burrell	NCAA	Division III	NJAC	2	8	0	8th	2	7	0	—	—
2009	2009	John Burrell	NCAA	Division III	NJAC	2	8	0	T–8th	2	7	0	—	—
2010	2010	John Burrell	NCAA	Division III	NJAC	0	10	0	10th	0	9	0	—	—
2011	2011	John Burrell	NCAA	Division III	NJAC	0	10	0	10th	0	9	0	—	—
2012	2012	Joe Loth	NCAA	Division III	NJAC	1	8	0	T–8th	1	7	0	—	—
2013	2013	Joe Loth	NCAA	Division III	MASCAC	8	2	0	2nd	6	2	0	W ECAC Northeast Bowl	—
2014	2014	Joe Loth	NCAA	Division III	MASCAC	7	4	0	2nd	6	2	0	L ECAC Northeast Bowl	—
2015	2015	Joe Loth	NCAA	Division III	MASCAC	5	5	0	T–4th	4	4	0	—	—
2016	2016	Joe Loth	NCAA	Division III	MASCAC	5	5	0	T–3rd	4	4	0	—	—
2017	2017	Joe Loth	NCAA	Division III	MASCAC	7	3	0	T–3rd	5	3	0	—	—
2018	2018	Joe Loth	NCAA	Division III	MASCAC	8	2	0	T–2nd	6	2	0	—	—
2019	2019	Joe Loth	NCAA	Division III	MASCAC	8	3	0	T–2nd	6	2	0	L New England Bowl	—
Season canceled due to COVID-19
2021	2021	Joe Loth	NCAA	Division III	MASCAC	5	5	0	5th	4	4	0	—	—
Western Connecticut Wolves
2022	2022	Joe Loth	NCAA	Division III	MASCAC	7	3	0	T–2nd	6	2	0	—	—
2023	2023	Joe Loth	NCAA	Division III	MASCAC	7	3	0	T–1st	7	1	0	L NCAA Division III First Round	—
2024	2024	Joe Loth	NCAA	Division III	MASCAC	9	2	0	2nd	8	1	0	W ECAC Bushnell Bowl	—
2025	2025	Kevin Jones	NCAA	Division III	Landmark	5	5	0	T–4th	2	4	0	—	—
