= John Burrell (American football coach) =

American football coach (born 1969)

Biographical details
- Born: c. 1969 (age 56–57); Ellicottville, New York, U.S.
- Education: Middlebury College (1993)

Coaching career (HC unless noted)
- 1991: Middlebury (intern)
- 1992: Middlebury (OLB)
- 1996–1997: Western Connecticut (GA)
- 1998–1999: Western Connecticut (DC/ST/S)
- 2000–2001: Western Connecticut (DC/LB)
- 2002–2011: Western Connecticut
- 2012–2014: Bowdoin (DC/LB)

Head coaching record
- Overall: 37–63

John Burrell (born c. 1969) is an American college football coach. He was the head football coach for Western Connecticut State University from 2002 to 2011. He also coached for Middlebury and Bowdoin.

== Head coaching record ==
Year	Team	Overall	Conference	Standing	Bowl/playoffs
Western Connecticut Colonials (Freedom Football Conference) (2002–2003)
2002	Western Connecticut	7–3	4–2	3rd	
2003	Western Connecticut	6–4	3–3	T–3rd	
Western Connecticut Colonials (New Jersey Athletic Conference) (2004–2011)
2004	Western Connecticut	5–5	2–4	T–4th	
2005	Western Connecticut	6–4	3–3	4th	
2006	Western Connecticut	5–5	2–5	T–5th	
2007	Western Connecticut	4–6	2–5	T–6th	
2008	Western Connecticut	2–8	2–7	8th	
2009	Western Connecticut	2–8	2–7	T–8th	
2010	Western Connecticut	0–10	0–10	10th	
2011	Western Connecticut	0–10	0–10	10th	
Western Connecticut:		37–63	20–54		
Total:		37–63			
