= Nick Cutulle =

American football player and coach (1942–2005)

Biographical details
- Born: October 10, 1942; Waterbury, Connecticut, U.S.
- Died: August 13, 2005 (aged 62); Southbridge, Massachusetts, U.S.

Playing career
- 1960–1963: Southern Connecticut

Coaching career (HC unless noted)
- 1969: Crosby HS (CT) (assistant)
- 1970–1971: Western Connecticut

Head coaching record
- Overall: 1–7

Nicholas Cutulle (October 10, 1942 – August 13, 2005) was an American college football player and coach. He was the head football coach at Western Connecticut State University from 1970 to 1971.

Cutulle was a three-year starter for Southern Connecticut from 1960 to 1963. In 1969, he was an assistant coach for the undefeated Crosby High School team.

== Head coaching record ==
Year	Team	Overall	Conference	Standing	Bowl/playoffs
Western Connecticut Colonials (NAIA Division I independent) (1970–1971)
1970	Western Connecticut	0–2			
1971	Western Connecticut	1–5			
Western Connecticut:		1–7			
Total:		1–7			
