= RPI–WPI football rivalry =

American college football rivalry

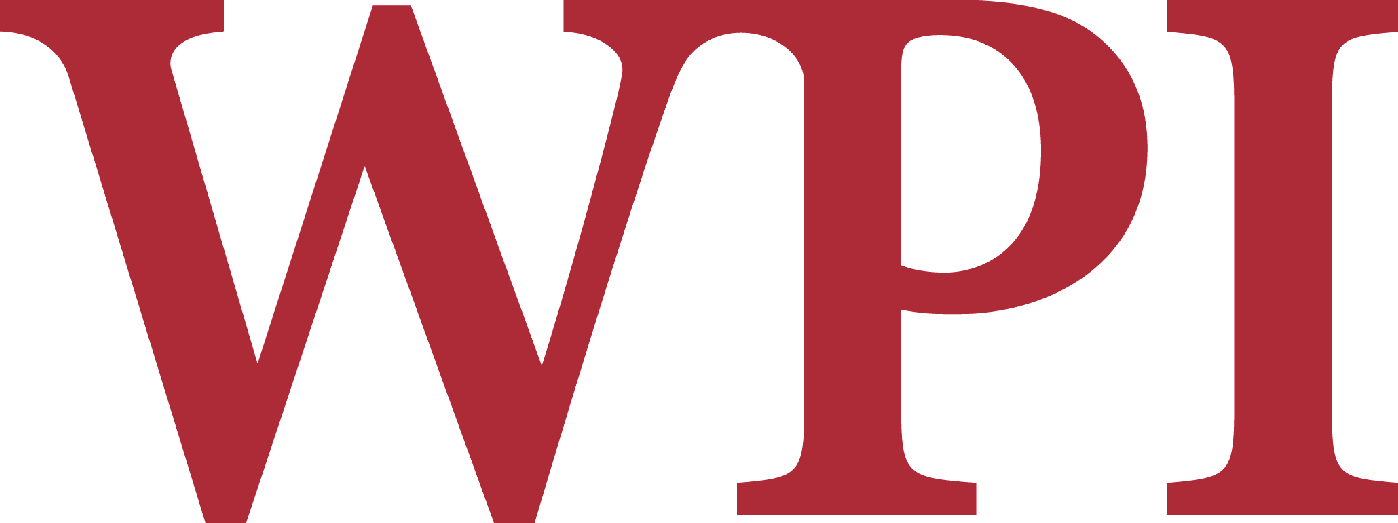
- RPI Engineers WPI Engineers
- Sport: Football
- First meeting: November 3, 1894; WPI 4, RPI 0
- Latest meeting: September 5, 2026; RP1 35, WPI 7
- Next meeting: 2027
- Trophy: Transit Trophy (since 1980)

Statistics
- Total meetings: 119
- All-time series: RPI leads, 66–48–5 (.576)
- Largest victory: RPI, 59–0 (1922)
- Longest win streak: WPI, 15 (1951–1966)
- Current win streak: RPI, 6 (2021–present)

The RPI–WPI football rivalry is an American college football rivalry between the RPI Engineers of Rensselaer Polytechnic Institute and the WPI Engineers of Worcester Polytechnic Institute. The two teams have played regularly since their first meeting in 1894, making it one of the oldest rivalries in college football history. The series was played uninterrupted from 1947 until 2020, when it was interrupted by the COVID-19 pandemic. Following the teams' 1979 meeting, the schools agreed to award a transit to the winning team; having become a tradition since 1980.

Locations of RPI and WPI

== Game results ==
| RPI victories | WPI victories | Tie games |

| No. | Date | Location | Winner | Score |
|---|---|---|---|---|
| 1 | November 3, 1894 | West Troy | WPI | 4–0 |
| 2 | October 5, 1895 | West Troy | Tie | 6–6 |
| 3 | October 16, 1897 | Worcester | WPI | 6–0 |
| 4 | November 13, 1897 | Troy | WPI | 6–0 |
| 5 | October 12, 1907 | Troy | RPI | 16–0 |
| 6 | October 31, 1908 | Worcester | RPI | 5–0 |
| 7 | November 6, 1909 | Troy | RPI | 3–0 |
| 8 | October 22, 1910 | Worcester | WPI | 8–0 |
| 9 | October 28, 1911 | Troy | RPI | 6–0 |
| 10 | November 2, 1912 | Worcester | RPI | 9–0 |
| 11 | November 15, 1913 | Troy | RPI | 6–0 |
| 12 | November 14, 1914 | Worcester | WPI | 14–0 |
| 13 | November 20, 1915 | Troy | RPI | 9–0 |
| 14 | November 11, 1916 | Worcester | RPI | 7–6 |
| 15 | October 20, 1917 | Worcester | WPI | 6–0 |
| 16 | October 11, 1919 | Worcester | RPI | 13–0 |
| 17 | October 23, 1920 | Troy | RPI | 7–6 |
| 18 | November 12, 1921 | Worcester | RPI | 7–6 |
| 19 | November 11, 1922 | Troy | RPI | 59–0 |
| 20 | November 10, 1923 | Worcester | RPI | 27–0 |
| 21 | November 8, 1924 | Troy | RPI | 33–6 |
| 22 | October 16, 1926 | Troy | RPI | 15–0 |
| 23 | November 5, 1927 | Worcester | WPI | 13–6 |
| 24 | November 16, 1929 | Troy | RPI | 7–6 |
| 25 | November 15, 1930 | Worcester | Tie | 0–0 |
| 26 | November 14, 1931 | Troy | WPI | 7–0 |
| 27 | November 12, 1932 | Worcester | WPI | 13–12 |
| 28 | November 11, 1933 | Troy | RPI | 6–0 |
| 29 | November 10, 1934 | Worcester | WPI | 32–6 |
| 30 | November 9, 1935 | Troy | WPI | 7–0 |
| 31 | November 7, 1936 | Worcester | WPI | 25–0 |
| 32 | November 6, 1937 | Troy | WPI | 14–0 |
| 33 | November 5, 1938 | Worcester | WPI | 14–7 |
| 34 | November 11, 1939 | Troy | Tie | 7–7 |
| 35 | November 9, 1940 | Worcester | WPI | 14–13 |
| 36 | November 8, 1941 | Troy | RPI | 47–0 |
| 37 | November 7, 1942 | Worcester | RPI | 19–15 |
| 38 | October 2, 1943 | Troy | RPI | 7–6 |
| 39 | September 23, 1944 | Worcester | WPI | 12–0 |
| 40 | September 22, 1945 | Troy | RPI | 39–0 |
| 41 | October 25, 1947 | Worcester | RPI | 12–0 |
| 42 | October 23, 1948 | Troy | RPI | 28–6 |
| 43 | October 22, 1949 | Worcester | RPI | 41–26 |
| 44 | October 25, 1950 | Troy | RPI | 13–0 |
| 45 | October 20, 1951 | Worcester | WPI | 12–7 |
| 46 | November 1, 1952 | Troy | WPI | 26–6 |
| 47 | October 31, 1953 | Worcester | Tie | 12–12 |
| 48 | October 30, 1954 | Troy | WPI | 26–6 |
| 49 | October 29, 1955 | Worcester | WPI | 45–0 |
| 50 | November 3, 1956 | Troy | WPI | 21–0 |
| 51 | November 2, 1957 | Worcester | WPI | 7–6 |
| 52 | November 1, 1958 | Troy | WPI | 26–6 |
| 53 | October 31, 1959 | Worcester | WPI | 20–0 |
| 54 | October 29, 1960 | Troy | WPI | 27–7 |
| 55 | November 4, 1961 | Worcester | WPI | 40–0 |
| 56 | November 3, 1962 | Troy | WPI | 40–0 |
| 57 | November 2, 1963 | Worcester | WPI | 31–0 |
| 58 | October 31, 1964 | Troy | WPI | 34–8 |
| 59 | October 30, 1965 | Worcester | WPI | 13–0 |
| 60 | October 29, 1966 | Troy | RPI | 13–0 |

| No. | Date | Location | Winner | Score |
|---|---|---|---|---|
| 61 | November 4, 1967 | Worcester | RPI | 21–0 |
| 62 | November 2, 1968 | Troy | WPI | 23–21 |
| 63 | November 1, 1969 | Worcester | WPI | 41–26 |
| 64 | October 31, 1970 | Troy | RPI | 15–14 |
| 65 | October 30, 1971 | Worcester | RPI | 28–21 |
| 66 | November 4, 1972 | Troy | WPI | 35–7 |
| 67 | November 3, 1973 | Worcester | RPI | 7–6 |
| 68 | November 2, 1974 | Troy | RPI | 28–14 |
| 69 | November 1, 1975 | Worcester | RPI | 26–25 |
| 70 | October 30, 1976 | Troy | RPI | 31–6 |
| 71 | October 29, 1977 | Worcester | RPI | 10–6 |
| 72 | October 28, 1978 | Troy | WPI | 28–15 |
| 73 | October 27, 1979 | Worcester | WPI | 21–14 |
| 74 | October 26, 1980 | Troy | RPI | 30–13 |
| 75 | October 31, 1981 | Worcester | WPI | 27–14 |
| 76 | October 30, 1982 | Troy | RPI | 7–3 |
| 77 | October 29, 1983 | Worcester | WPI | 28–8 |
| 78 | October 27, 1984 | Troy | RPI | 10–7 |
| 79 | October 26, 1985 | Worcester | WPI | 28–21 |
| 80 | October 25, 1986 | Troy | RPI | 28–24 |
| 81 | October 31, 1987 | Worcester | RPI | 23–21 |
| 82 | October 1, 1988 | Troy | RPI | 26–7 |
| 83 | September 30, 1989 | Worcester | WPI | 31–24 |
| 84 | September 29, 1990 | Troy | Tie | 17–17 |
| 85 | September 28, 1991 | Worcester | WPI | 26–14 |
| 86 | October 3, 1992 | Troy | WPI | 28–14 |
| 87 | October 2, 1993 | Worcester | RPI | 31–14 |
| 88 | October 1, 1994 | Troy | RPI | 21–14 |
| 89 | September 30, 1995 | Worcester | WPI | 21–20 |
| 90 | October 5, 1996 | Troy | WPI | 13–10 |
| 91 | October 4, 1997 | Worcester | RPI | 37–16 |
| 92 | September 26, 1998 | Troy | RPI | 42–19 |
| 93 | September 25, 1999 | Worcester | RPI | 42–27 |
| 94 | September 23, 2000 | Troy | RPI | 45–0 |
| 95 | September 22, 2001 | Worcester | RPI | 31–14 |
| 96 | September 28, 2002 | Troy | RPI | 33–13 |
| 97 | September 27, 2003 | Worcester | RPI | 34–26 |
| 98 | October 30, 2004 | Troy | RPI | 35–33 |
| 99 | October 29, 2005 | Worcester | RPI | 31–15 |
| 100 | October 28, 2006 | Troy | RPI | 26–0 |
| 101 | October 27, 2007 | Worcester | RPI | 21–14^{OT} |
| 102 | September 27, 2008 | Troy | RPI | 35–21 |
| 103 | September 26, 2009 | Worcester | RPI | 42–33 |
| 104 | September 25, 2010 | Troy | WPI | 24–10 |
| 105 | September 24, 2011 | Worcester | WPI | 34–31 |
| 106 | September 22, 2012 | Troy | RPI | 39–17 |
| 107 | September 28, 2013 | Worcester | WPI | 27–14 |
| 108 | September 27, 2014 | Troy | RPI | 27–6 |
| 109 | September 26, 2015 | Worcester | RPI | 28–21 |
| 110 | October 22, 2016 | Troy | WPI | 19–7 |
| 111 | September 9, 2017 | Worcester | RPI | 36–14 |
| 112 | September 8, 2018 | Troy | RPI | 25–14 |
| 113 | September 14, 2019 | Worcester | WPI | 6–3 |
| 114 | September 18, 2021 | Worcester | RPI | 24–10 |
| 115 | September 17, 2022 | Troy | RPI | 37–0 |
| 116 | September 15, 2023 | Worcester | RPI | 25–0 |
| 117 | September 20, 2024 | Troy | RPI | 51–7 |
| 118 | September 6, 2025 | Worcester | RPI | 26–9 |
| 119 | September 5, 2026 | Troy | RPI | 35–7 |
Series: RPI leads 66–48–5

== See also ==
- List of NCAA college football rivalry games
