= Dave Rice (American football) =

American football player, coach, and administrator (born 1940)

Biographical details
- Born: c. 1940 (age 85–86)

Playing career
- 1957–1960: Ithaca

Coaching career (HC unless noted)
- 1961–1968: Greenwich HS (CT)
- 1969–1971: Columbia (assistant)
- 1972–1974: Western Connecticut
- 1975–1978: Fordham

Administrative career (AD unless noted)
- 1979–1985: Fordham

Head coaching record
- Overall: 32–30–2 (college)

Accomplishments and honors

Championships
- 1 MIC (1977)

Awards
- Fordham University Coach of the Year (1977); MIC Coach of the Year (1977); American Football Association Hall of Fame; Jack Coffey Award (1997)

David Rice (born c. 1940) is an American former college football coach and college athletics administrator. He was the head football coach at Western Connecticut State University from 1972 to 1974 and at Fordham University from 1975 to 1978, compiling a career college football coaching record of 32–30–2. He led the Fordham Rams to the Metropolitan Intercollegiate Conference (MIC) championship in 1977 and was the athletic director at Fordham from 1979 to 1985.

== Personal life ==
Rice grew up in Hastings-on-Hudson, New York and attended Hastings High School, graduating in 1957. He went on to play football at Ithaca College from 1957 to 1960 and then earned a master's degree from New York University.

He is married to Jeanne Taylor, the former assistant athletic director at the University of Mississippi. They reside in Marco Island, Florida.

== Head coaching record ==
=== College ===
Year	Team	Overall	Conference	Standing	Bowl/playoffs
Western Connecticut Indians (NAIA independent) (1972–1974)
1972	Western Connecticut	1–7			
1973	Western Connecticut	4–5			
1974	Western Connecticut	4–5			
Western Connecticut:		9–17			
Fordham Rams (Metropolitan Intercollegiate Conference) (1975–1977)
1975	Fordham	3–5–1	1–2–1	4th	
1976	Fordham	5–3–1	1–2–1	T–4th	
1977	Fordham	8–2	3–0	1st	
Fordham Rams (NCAA Division III independent) (1978)
1978	Fordham	7–3			
Fordham:		23–13–2	5–4–2		
Total:		32–30–2			
National championship Conference title Conference division title or championship game berth
