= Tim Coen =

American football coach

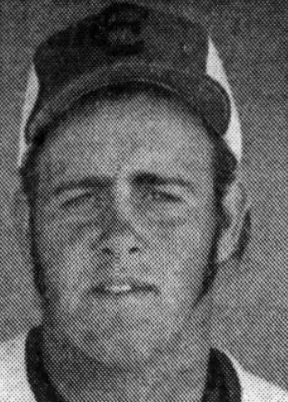
- Coen in 1974

Biographical details
- Born: c. 1952 or 1953 (age 73–74); Barrington, Rhode Island, U.S.

Playing career

Baseball
- 1971–1974: Eckerd
- Position: Designated hitter

Coaching career (HC unless noted)

Football
- 1985–1989: Cumberland High School
- 1990–1991: Exeter-West Greenwich HS (RI)
- 1992–1999: Salve Regina
- 2000–2003: La Salle Academy (RI)
- 2004–2005: Portsmouth HS (RI)

Administrative career (AD unless noted)
- 1990–1992: Exeter-West Greenwich HS (RI)

Head coaching record
- Overall: 53–12 (college)
- Bowls: 1–2

Accomplishments and honors

Championships
- 2 ECFC (1996–1997); 2 NEFC (1998–1999)

Timothy Coen (born c. 1952 or 1953) is an American former football coach. He was the head football coach at Salve Regina University from 1992 to 1999.

Coen was a longtime high school football coach throughout Rhode Island before and after his stint with Salve Regina. He amassed an overall record of 36–12–1 and won the Rhode Island Class C championship with South Kingstown High School in 1989 before beginning the football program for Exeter-West Greenwich Senior High School in 1990.

Coen attended Barrington High School before enrolling to play college baseball for Eckerd College as a designated hitter.

== Personal life ==
Coen's son, Liam, is the head coach for the Jacksonville Jaguars of the National Football League (NFL).

== Head coaching record ==
=== College ===
Year	Team	Overall	Conference	Standing	Bowl/playoffs
Salve Regina Seahawks (NCAA Division III independent) (1993)
1993	Salve Regina	4–2			
Salve Regina Seahawks (Eastern Collegiate Football Conference) (1994–1997)
1994	Salve Regina	8–1	6–0	N/A	
1995	Salve Regina	7–2	6–2	3rd	
1996	Salve Regina	9–1	8–0	1st	L Northwest Bowl
1997	Salve Regina	7–2	4–0	1st	
Salve Regina Seahawks (New England Football Conference) (1998–1999)
1998	Salve Regina	10–1	6–0	1st	W Northeast Bowl
1999	Salve Regina	8–3	6–0	1st	L Northeast Bowl
Salve Regina:		53–12	36–2		
Total:		53–12			
National championship Conference title Conference division title or championship game berth
