= Liam Coen =

American football player and coach (born 1985)

Jacksonville Jaguars
- Title: Head coach

Personal information
- Born: November 8, 1985 (age 41); Warwick, Rhode Island, U.S.
- Listed height: 6 ft 1 in (1.85 m)
- Listed weight: 223 lb (101 kg)

Career information
- Position: Quarterback
- High school: La Salle (Providence, Rhode Island)
- College: UMass (2004–2008)
- NFL draft: 2009: undrafted

Career history

Playing
- Manchester Wolves (2009); Alabama Vipers (2010)

Coaching
- Brown (2010) Quarterbacks coach; Rhode Island (2011) Pass game coordinator & quarterbacks coach; Brown (2012–2013) Quarterbacks coach; UMass (2014–2015) Pass game coordinator & quarterbacks coach; Maine (2016–2017) Offensive coordinator & quarterbacks coach; Los Angeles Rams (2018–2020); Assistant wide receivers coach (2018–2019); Assistant quarterbacks coach (2020); Kentucky (2021) Offensive coordinator & quarterbacks coach; Los Angeles Rams (2022) Offensive coordinator; Kentucky (2023) Offensive coordinator & quarterbacks coach; Tampa Bay Buccaneers (2024) Offensive coordinator; Jacksonville Jaguars (2025–present) Head coach

Head coaching record
- Regular season: 20–6 (.769)
- Postseason: 0–1 (.000)
- Career: 20–7 (.741)
- Coaching profile at Pro Football Reference
- Stats at ArenaFan.com

Liam Patrick Coen (born November 8, 1985) is an American professional football coach who is the head coach for the Jacksonville Jaguars of the National Football League (NFL). He previously served as the offensive coordinator for the Tampa Bay Buccaneers in 2024 and for the Los Angeles Rams two years prior. Before that, Coen was an assistant coach at the University of Kentucky, University of Maine, UMass, University of Rhode Island, and Brown University.

== Early life and playing career ==
Coen was born in Warwick, Rhode Island on November 8, 1985. He was raised in South Kingstown, Coen played for his father, Tim, at La Salle Academy in Providence where he was named Rhode Island's Gatorade Player of the Year. Coen also played quarterback at UMass from 2004 to 2008 where he was a four-year starter, wearing the jersey number 12 in honor of his favorite athlete, Tom Brady; he was roommates with future NFL wide receiver Victor Cruz.

Coen holds six UMass career passing records. In 2006, he led the Minutemen to undefeated 8–0 record in Atlantic 10 Conference play, won the A-10 Championship and advanced all the way to the NCAA FCS National Championship game.

In 2022, he was inducted into UMass Athletics Hall of Fame.

Pre-draft measurables
Height	Weight
6 ft 1 1/8 in (1.86 m)	223 lb (101 kg)
Values from Pro Day

Coen played two seasons of professional football. In July 2009, Coen signed with the Manchester Wolves of the af2 to serve as the team's backup quarterback for the playoffs. He was a backup for the Alabama Vipers of the Arena Football League in 2010.

== Coaching career ==
=== Early coaching career ===
After his playing career ended, Coen worked at Brown as their quarterbacks coach in 2010 as well as 2012 to 2013. He spent 2011 with Rhode Island as their pass game coordinator and quarterbacks coach.

Coen moved on to his alma mater UMass in 2014 as their pass game coordinator and quarterbacks coach. Two years later, Coen was hired by Maine as their offensive coordinator, incorporating schemes he learned at UMass from Mark Whipple.

Coen initially accepted a position at Holy Cross in 2018 as their offensive coordinator before accepting a position with the Los Angeles Rams.

=== Los Angeles Rams (2018–2019) ===
Coen was hired to be the assistant wide receivers coach for the Rams in 2018. Two years later, he was reassigned to be the assistant quarterbacks coach.

=== Kentucky (2020–2021) ===
Coen was named the offensive coordinator and quarterbacks coach at Kentucky on December 15, 2020. In Coen's unofficial interview with Kentucky head coach Mark Stoops, he presented a detailed plan of schedules and responsibilities as well as a video compilation of 300 offensive plays he thought he could implement from his time with the Rams. Coen helped the Wildcats to a 10–3 record, including a 20–17 victory over Iowa in the 2022 Citrus Bowl.

=== Los Angeles Rams (second stint) (2022) ===
On February 21, 2022, Coen was hired by the Los Angeles Rams as their offensive coordinator, replacing Kevin O'Connell, following his departure to become the head coach of the Minnesota Vikings.

=== Kentucky (second stint) (2023) ===
On January 10, 2023, Coen returned to his previous role as the offensive coordinator and quarterbacks coach at Kentucky. He helped coach the team to a 7–6 record averaging 29.1 points per game.

=== Tampa Bay Buccaneers (2024) ===
On February 3, 2024, Coen was hired by the Tampa Bay Buccaneers as their offensive coordinator under second-year head coach Todd Bowles. He helped the team to a 10–7 record with the offense ranking fourth in points scored and third in total yardage.

=== Jacksonville Jaguars (2025–present) ===
On January 24, 2025, Coen was hired as the head coach of the Jacksonville Jaguars, replacing Doug Pederson. In his first season as head coach, the Jaguars finished atop the AFC South with a 13–4 record.

Coen made his playoff head coaching debut in the wild card round against the Buffalo Bills, but the Jaguars lost 27–24.

== Head coaching record ==
Team	Year	Regular season					Postseason			
Team	Year	Won	Lost	Ties	Win %	Finish	Won	Lost	Win %	Result
JAX	2025	13	4	0	.765	1st in AFC South	0	1	.000	Lost to Buffalo Bills in AFC Wild Card Game
JAX	2026	7	2	0	.778	1st in AFC South	0	0	–	
Total		20	6	0	.769		0	1	.000	

== Personal life ==
Coen is a Catholic. Coen and his wife, Ashley, have two sons.
