= Salve Regina Seahawks football =

College football team

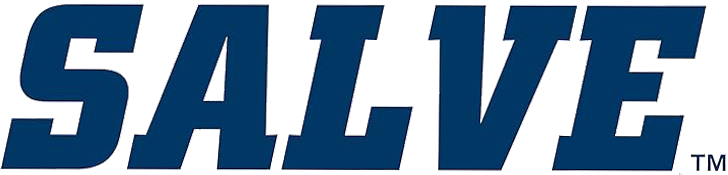
- First season: 1993; 33 years ago
- Athletic director: Sean Sullivan
- Head coach: Kevin Gilmartin; 12th season, 76–37 (.673)
- Location: Newport, Rhode Island
- Stadium: Toppa Field (capacity: 2,000)
- NCAA division: Division III
- Conference: NEWMAC
- Colors: Blue and green
- All-time record: 182–120 (.603)
- Bowl record: 5–5 (.500)

Conference championships
- 2 ECFC (1996–1997); 2 NEFC (1998–1999)

Division championships
- 4 NEFC Boyd / Blue Division (1998–2000, 2012)
- Mascot: Seahawk
- Website: salveathletics.com/football

The Salve Regina Seahawks football team represents Salve Regina University in college football at the NCAA Division III level. The Seahawks are members of the New England Women's and Men's Athletic Conference (NEWMAC), fielding its team in the NEWMAC since 2023. The Seahawks play their home games at Toppa Field in Newport, Rhode Island.

The team's head coach is Kevin Gilmartin, who took over the position for the 2013 season.

== Conference affiliations ==
- Independent (1993)
- Eastern Collegiate Football Conference (1994–1997)
- New England Football Conference / Commonwealth Coast football (1998–2022)
- New England Women's and Men's Athletic Conference (2023–present)

== List of head coaches ==
=== Key ===
Key to symbols in coaches list
General		Overall		Conference		Postseason (Note: Although the first Rose Bowl Game was played in 1902, it has been continuously played since the 1916 game, and is recognized as the oldest bowl game by the NCAA. "—" indicates any season prior to 1916 when postseason games were not played.)	
No.	Order of coaches (Note: A running total of the number of head coaches, with coaches who served separate tenures being counted only once. Interim head coaches are represented with "Int" and are not counted in the running total. "—" indicates the team played but either without a coach or no coach is on record. "X" indicates an interim year without play.)	GC	Games coached	CW	Conference wins	PW	Postseason wins
DC	Division championships	OW	Overall wins	CL	Conference losses	PL	Postseason losses
CC	Conference championships	OL	Overall losses	CT	Conference ties	PT	Postseason ties
NC	National championships	OT	Overall ties (Note: Overtime rules in college football were introduced in 1996, making ties impossible in the period since.)	C%	Conference winning percentage		
†	Elected to the College Football Hall of Fame	O%	Overall winning percentage (Note: When computing the win–loss percentage, a tie counts as half a win and half a loss.)				

=== Coaches ===
List of head football coaches showing season(s) coached, overall records, conference records, bowl records, championships and selected awards
No.	Name	Season(s)	GC	OW	OL	O%	CW	CL	C%	BW	BL	DC	CC
1	Tim Coen	1993–1999	65	53	12	0.815	36	2	0.947	1	2	N/A	4
2	Art Bell	2000–2005	55	19	36	0.345	13	21	0.382	N/A	N/A	1	0
3	Chris Robertson	2006–2009	37	11	26	0.297	7	21	0.250	N/A	N/A	0	0
4	Bob Chesney	2010–2012	32	23	9	0.719	18	6	0.750	1	0	1	0
5	Kevin Gilmartin	2013–present	113	76	37	0.673	51	21	0.708	3	3	N/A	1

== Year-by-year results ==
National champions	Conference champions	Bowl game berth	Playoff berth

Season	Year	Head coach	Association	Division	Conference	Record					Postseason	Final ranking
Season	Year	Head coach	Association	Division	Conference	Overall		Conference			Postseason	Final ranking
Season	Year	Head coach	Association	Division	Conference	Win	Loss	Finish	Win	Loss	Postseason	Final ranking
Salve Regina Seahawks
1993	1993	Tim Coen	NCAA	Division III	Independent	4	2				—	—
1994	1994	Tim Coen	NCAA	Division III	ECFC	8	1	N/A	6	0	—	—
1995	1995	Tim Coen	NCAA	Division III	ECFC	7	2	3rd	6	2	—	—
1996	1996	Tim Coen	NCAA	Division III	ECFC	9	1	1st	8	0	L ECAC Bowl	—
1997	1997	Tim Coen	NCAA	Division III	ECFC	7	2	1st	4	0	—	—
1998	1998	Tim Coen	NCAA	Division III	NEFC	10	1	1st (Blue)	6	0	W ECAC Bowl	—
1999	1999	Tim Coen	NCAA	Division III	NEFC	8	3	1st (Blue)	6	0	L ECAC Bowl	—
2000	2000	Art Bell	NCAA	Division III	NEFC	7	3	1st (Boyd)	4	1	Division champions	—
2001	2001	Art Bell	NCAA	Division III	NEFC	4	4	4th (Boyd)	2	3	—	—
2002	2002	Art Bell	NCAA	Division III	NEFC	2	7	T–4th (Boyd)	2	3	—	—
2003	2003	Art Bell	NCAA	Division III	NEFC	2	8	5th (Boyd)	2	4	—	—
2004	2004	Art Bell	NCAA	Division III	NEFC	2	8	6th (Boyd)	1	6	—	—
2005	2005	Art Bell	NCAA	Division III	NEFC	2	6	T–4th (Boyd)	2	4	—	—
2006	2006	Chris Robertson	NCAA	Division III	NEFC	1	8	8th (Boyd)	0	7	—	—
2007	2007	Chris Robertson	NCAA	Division III	NEFC	2	7	T–7th (Boyd)	1	6	—	—
2008	2008	Chris Robertson	NCAA	Division III	NEFC	4	5	T–4th (Boyd)	3	4	—	—
2009	2009	Chris Robertson	NCAA	Division III	NEFC	4	6	T–4th (Boyd)	3	4	—	—
2010	2010	Bob Chesney	NCAA	Division III	NEFC	6	4	3rd (Boyd)	5	3	—	—
2011	2011	Bob Chesney	NCAA	Division III	NEFC	8	3	3rd (Boyd)	6	2	W ECAC Northwest Bowl	—
2012	2012	Bob Chesney	NCAA	Division III	NEFC	9	2	1st (Boyd)	7	1	Division champions	24
2013	2013	Kevin Gilmartin	NCAA	Division III	NEFC	7	4	2nd	6	1	L ECAC Bowl	—
2014	2014	Kevin Gilmartin	NCAA	Division III	NEFC	7	4	T–2nd	5	2	W ECAC Bowl	—
2015	2015	Kevin Gilmartin	NCAA	Division III	NEFC	8	2	T–2nd	5	2	W ECAC Chapman Bowl	—
2016	2016	Kevin Gilmartin	NCAA	Division III	NEFC	8	2	2nd	6	1	L New England Bowl	—
2017	2017	Kevin Gilmartin	NCAA	Division III	CCC Football	6	3	3rd	3	2	—	—
2018	2018	Kevin Gilmartin	NCAA	Division III	CCC Football	7	4	T–1st	5	1	L New England Bowl	—
2019	2019	Kevin Gilmartin	NCAA	Division III	CCC Football	4	6	5th	3	4	—	—
No team in 2020 due to COVID-19.
2021	2021	Kevin Gilmartin	NCAA	Division III	NEFC	8	2	T–3rd	4	2	—	—
2022	2022	Kevin Gilmartin	NCAA	Division III	NEFC	6	4	T–3rd	3	3	—	—
2023	2023	Kevin Gilmartin	NCAA	Division III	NEWMAC	9	2	2nd	6	1	W New England Bowl	—
2024	2024	Kevin Gilmartin	NCAA	Division III	NEWMAC	6	4	T–2nd	5	2	—	–

== See also ==
- Salve Regina Seahawks
