= John McKechnie (coach) =

American lacrosse and football coach

Coaching career (HC unless noted)

Football
- 1992: Amherst

Lacrosse
- 1984–1994: Amherst
- 1995–2000: Wooster
- 2010: Bard

Head coaching record
- Overall: 0–8 (football); 60–42 (lacrosse)

Accomplishments and honors

Championships
- Lacrosse; New England ECAC (1987)

Awards
- New England Lacrosse Coaches Assoc. COY (1987)

John McKechnie is an American college lacrosse and football coach. In 2009, he became the first men's lacrosse coach at Bard College. He previously coached the men's lacrosse teams at Amherst College and the College of Wooster. While at Amherst, McKechnie also served as an assistant football coach under Jim Ostendarp and as the head football coach during the 1992 season. He was named the 1987 New England Lacrosse Coaches Association Coach of the Year for leading Amherst to the Division III New England ECAC championship.

== Biography ==
McKechnie graduated from Amherst College in 1977. After college, he embarked upon his coaching career as a member of the Amherst football and basketball staffs. In 1984, the school named him the head men's lacrosse coach. In 1987, he led the team to the New England Eastern College Athletic Conference championship, and the New England Lacrosse Coaches Association named him the Coach of the Year. In 1991, McKechnie was the assistant coach to Connecticut College head coach Fran Shields during the Division III North/South Senior All-Star Game.

In February 1992, Amherst promoted McKechnie from the position of associate head football coach to co-head coach alongside Jim Ostendarp. In March 1992, he took over as head coach when Ostendarp resigned after 33 years at the program. After Amherst amassed a 0–8 record in the 1992 season, he resigned on November 24, 1992.

From 1995 to 2000, he coached the lacrosse team at the College of Wooster. During that time, he served on the Division III All-American Committee and the National Ranking Committee. In 2009, Bard College hired McKechnie as its first ever men's lacrosse coach. During his first season in 2010, Bard finished winless with a 0–11 record.
