= WPI Engineers football =

College football team in Massachusetts

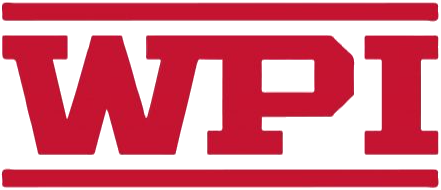
- First season: 1887; 139 years ago
- Head coach: Chris Robertson; 15th season, 69–74 (.483)
- Location: Worcester, Massachusetts
- Stadium: Alumni Stadium (capacity: 2,000)
- NCAA division: Division III
- Conference: NEWMAC
- Colors: Crimson and gray
- All-time record: 371–542–29 (.409)
- Bowl record: 2–2 (.500)

Conference championships
- 1992, 1993, 2019
- Rivalries: RPI Engineers; MIT Engineers
- Fight song: "E to the X"
- Mascot: Gompei the Goat
- Marching band: WPI Pep Band
- Website: athletics.wpi.edu/football

The WPI Engineers football team represents Worcester Polytechnic Institute (WPI) in the sport of American football. The Engineers compete in Division III (DIII) of the National Collegiate Athletic Association (NCAA) and the NEWMAC. WPI's football program is one of the oldest in the country. The team has been coached by Chris Robertson since the 2010 season.

WPI plays its home games at Alumni Stadium, located on the campus in Worcester, Massachusetts, with a capacity of 2,000.

== History ==
Prior to competing in collegiate football, WPI played association football (often called soccer) from 1874 to 1876 and American rugby from 1877 to 1881. Starting in 1882, WPI attempted to play football as a sport. It was not until 1885 that the football team was taken seriously. The 1887 season was the first in which the team competed as a varsity sport. Following their outstanding performance in the 1888 season, the Engineers were invited to join a football league of small New England colleges, but the faculty refused the idea and barred the team from playing any away games. The Institute's opinion of football would improve by the turn of the century and give more support to the team.

== Bowl games ==
WPI has appeared in four bowl games and has a 2–2 record.

Year	Bowl	Coach	Opponent	Result
1991	ECAC Northeast Bowl	Jack Siedlecki	Buffalo State	L 17–23
2015	ECAC Presidents Bowl	Chris Robertson	Kean	L 6–24
2017	New England Bowl Series Game	Chris Robertson	SUNY Maritime	W 17–3
2019	New England Bowl Series Game	Chris Robertson	Western Connecticut State	W 35–6
