= Sabine Field =

University sports stadium in Vermont, U.S.

Coordinates: 44°8′29″N 72°39′36″W

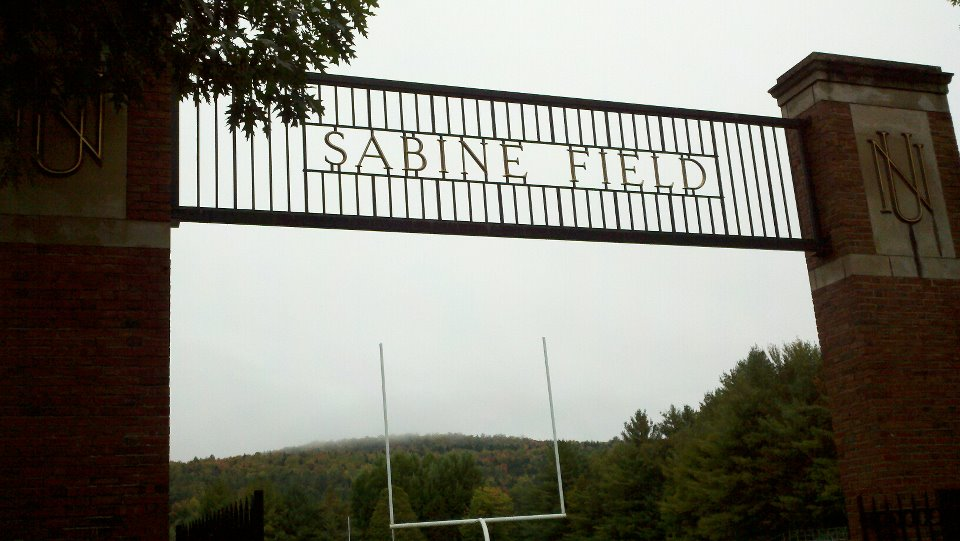
- Interactive map of Sabine Field
- Full name: Sabine Athletic Field
- Location: Northfield, Vermont
- Owner: Norwich University
- Capacity: 3,000

Construction
- Opened: 1921
- Renovated: 2013

Tenant
- Norwich Cadets

Sabine Field is a 3,000 capacity stadium in Northfield, Vermont on the campus of the NCAA Division III-affiliated Norwich University. Opened in 1921, it serves as home to the school's football and track teams. The field is named for the son of Dr. George K. Sabine, a member of Norwich's Class of 1868, who provided funds to purchase the athletic field's land.

Since 1958, Sabine Field area has also been home to a WWII-era M4 Sherman tank named "Sabine Sally". The tank was placed in honor of the Norwich men who served in the Armored Forces in World War II, and it was dedicated by Norwich alumnus and Medal of Honor recipient Captain James M. Burt.

== Alumni March On ==
Each fall on the university's Alumni Weekend, Sabine Field hosts the Alumni March On. At this ceremony, all returning alumni parade by class on to the field with the current year's Corps of Cadets.

== Renovation ==
Following the 2012 football season, the stadium underwent a $6 million dollar renovation that allowed for the stadium to host multiple sports.
