= New England Bowl =

New England Bowl Series
- Location: Varied (campus sites)
- Operated: 2016–2023
- Conference tie-ins: At-large picks from ECFC, MASCAC, CCC Football, NEWMAC

The New England Bowl was an annual NCAA Division III post-season college football bowl game series established in 2016 by four New England football conferences (ECFC, MASCAC, CCC Football, NEWMAC) pulling their teams from the ECAC Bowl structure. All four conferences were eligible for postseason play and each of the 27 football-playing institutions in the conferences were eligible to participate in the New England Bowl series. The criteria used by the commissioners to select the teams required an overall winning percentage of .667 or higher and they evaluated overall record, conference record, conference standing, head-to-head results, and results versus teams selected for the NCAA Tournament.

The inaugural game was held on Saturday, November 19, 2016, at Gaudet Field in Middletown, Rhode Island, with a victory of Framingham State over Salve Regina. The following years, the bowl was transformed into a series, with three or two bowl games played. The series was not renewed for the 2024 season.

== Game results ==
Season	Winner	Loser	Result	Source
2016
2016	Framingham State	Salve Regina	37–34	
2017
2017	Framingham State	Curry	48–14	
2017	WPI	Maritime	17–3	
2018
2018	Bridgewater State	Salve Regina	34–19	
2018	Merchant Marine	Endicott	38–22	
2018	Springfield	Maritime	17–14	
2019
2019	Endicott	Dean	52–10	
2019	WPI	Western Connecticut	35–6	
2021
2021	Merchant Marine	Western New England	63–35	
2021	UMass Dartmouth	Alfred State	42–16	
2022
2022	Plymouth State	Husson	21–20	
2022	Bridgewater State	Catholic University	34–24	
2023	Western New England	UMass Dartmouth	37–7	
2023	Salve Regina	Anna Maria	37–34	

The 2020 bowls were canceled due to the COVID-19 pandemic.
