= Alumni Stadium (WPI) =

Stadium in Worcester, Massachusetts

- Alumni Field
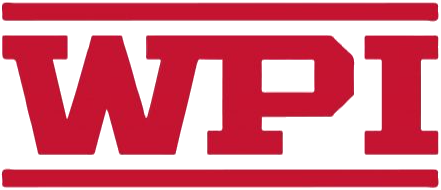

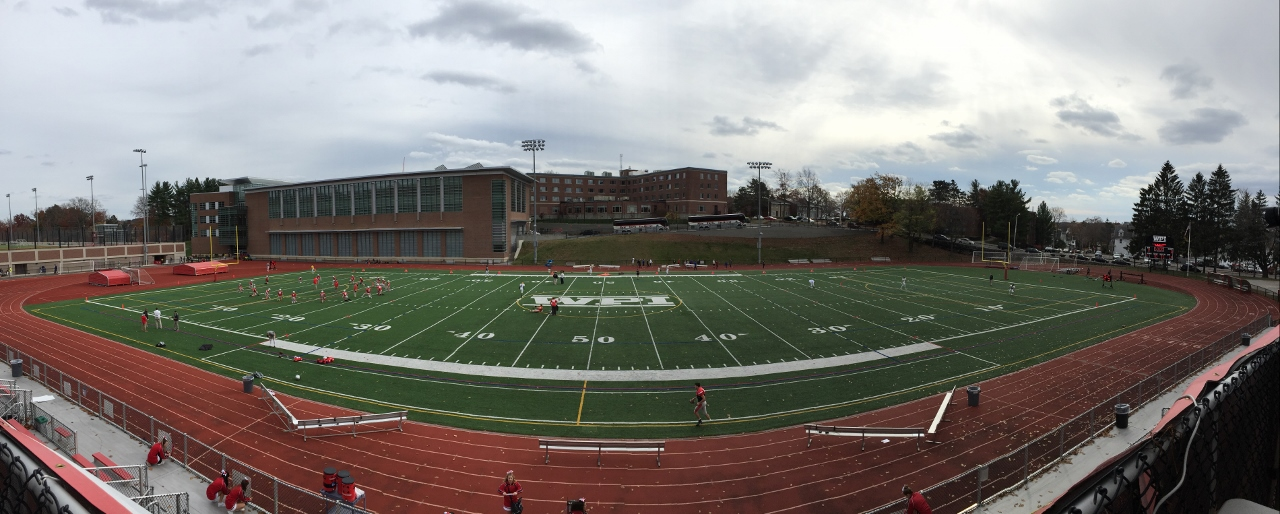
- View from the top of the press box prior to a football game in 2015.
- Interactive map of Alumni Stadium
- Location: 100 Institute Road, Worcester, MA 01609
- Coordinates: 42°16′26″N 71°48′42″W
- Owner: Worcester Polytechnic Institute
- Operator: Worcester Polytechnic Institute
- Capacity: 2,000 (2007–present); 2,800 (1926–2006)
- Surface: FieldTurf (2007–present); AstroTurf 12 (1997–2006); Omniturf (1985–96); Grass (1914–84)

Construction
- Groundbreaking: 1913
- Opened: November 14, 1914; 111 years ago
- Renovated: 1926, 1985, 1997, 2007
- Cost: US$25,000 ($814,394 in 2025 dollars)
- Architect: Olmsted Brothers
- General contractor: Varnum P. Curtis

Tenants
- WPI Engineers (NCAA) football (1914–present)

Website
- wpi.edu/alumni-stadium

Alumni Stadium is a football and all-purpose stadium located on the campus of Worcester Polytechnic Institute in Worcester, Massachusetts. It is the home field of the WPI Engineers football team of the New England Women's and Men's Athletic Conference (NEWMAC). The present seating capacity of the stadium is 2,000. Opened 111 years ago in 1914, it was named Alumni Stadium in honor of all the alumni who funded its construction.

== History ==
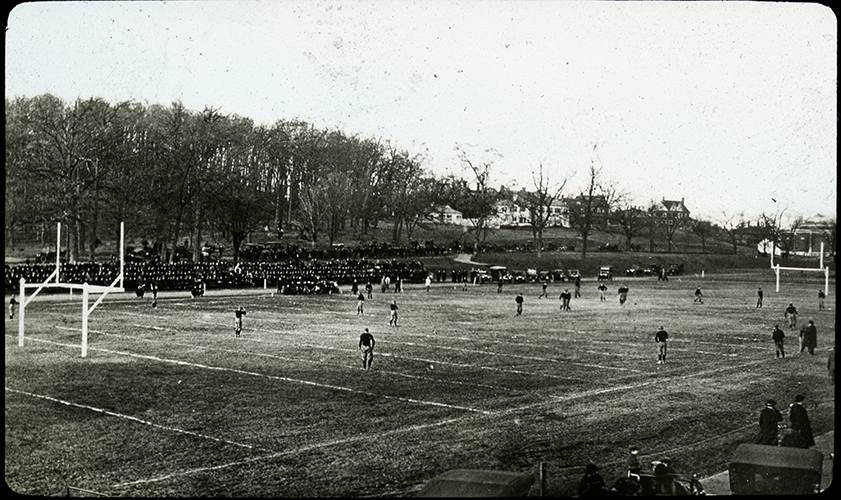
The First Football Game at Alumni Stadium, November 14, 1914

The Class of 1886 started the efforts to raise funds for both a field and gymnasium at the 1911 Alumni Council meeting. The goal of $200,000 ($6.52 million in 2025 dollars) for the building of both a field ($25,000) and a gymnasium ($100,000) was reached in June 1913. The remaining funds ($75,000) were spent on purchasing gym equipment and starting an endowment. The 1911 plan originally called for Alumni Stadium to build on a strip of land west of Bliss Field, where the Engineers had been playing their games. When the institute purchased twelve acres near Park Avenue in 1912, it became apparent that this newly acquired land was more adaptable for their new field. The Olmsted Brothers were hired to draft new plans for an athletic field and discovered the institute would be required to purchase an additional tract of land from the Worcester Art Museum to build Alumni Stadium. The construction contract was awarded to Alumnus Varnum P. Curtis in May 1913 with Professor Arthur W. French being the consulting engineer and Professor Arthur J. Knight as the resident engineer. In the summer of 1913 they broke ground.

Prior to the 1914 season, the field had its final grading and seeding completed. On November 14, 1914, the first game was played at the stadium culminating with a 14–0 win over their rivals, the RPI Engineers. Although, it was not until the following year, 1915 (WPI's 50th Anniversary) that construction was complete with the installation of a decorative iron fence and gate.

=== Renovations ===
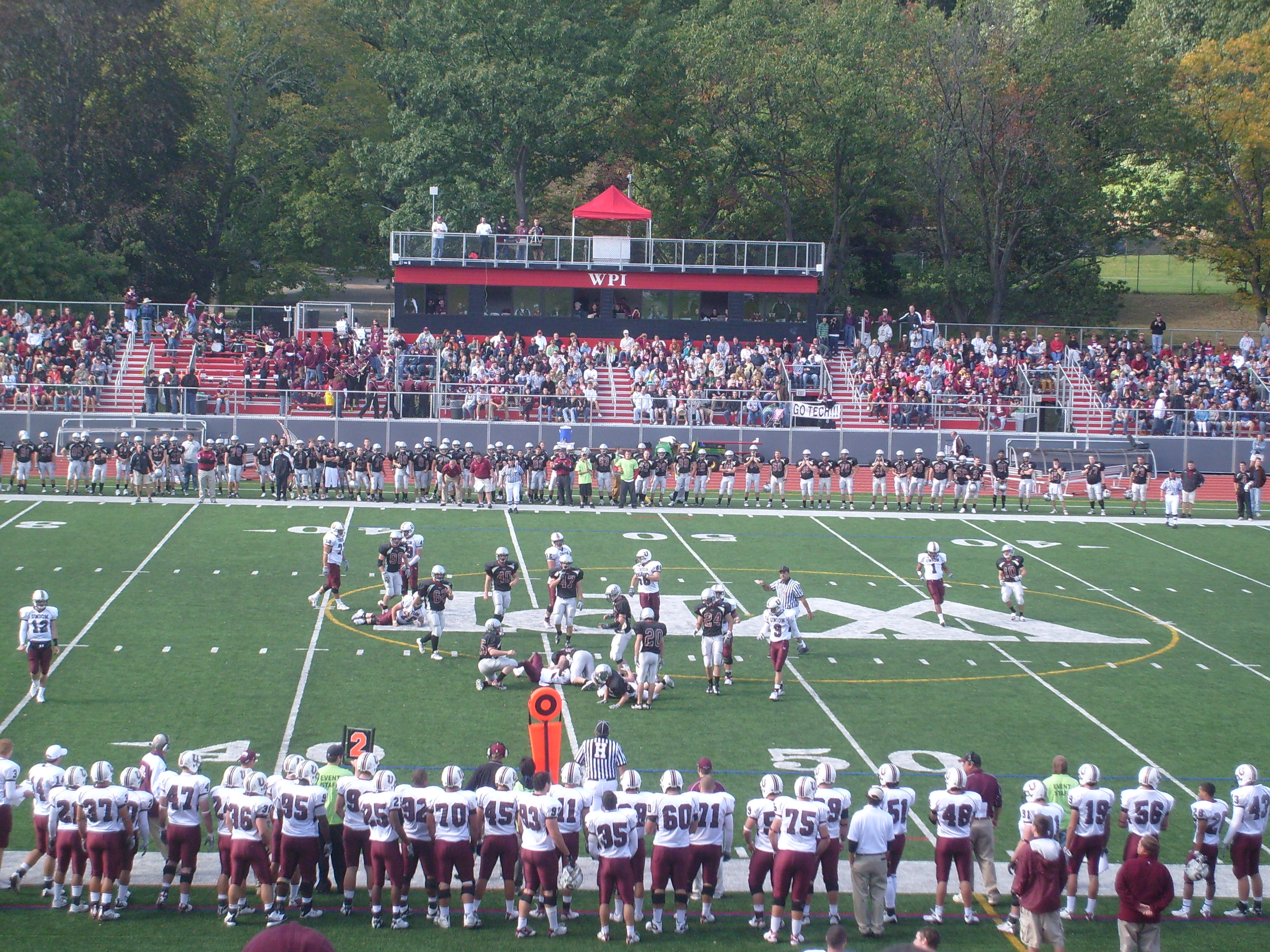
A look at the upgraded stands and press box after the 2007 Renovation during a football game in 2009.

The first renovations of Alumni Stadium occurred in 1926 when bleachers with a capacity of 2,800 were installed on the east and west side of the field. In May 1985, an Omniturf surface was installed marking the first time the Engineers would play its home games on a turf field. This switch from grass to turf was met with criticism from the WPI community citing both cost and safety concerns. The latter stemming from articles published by both the local newspaper, the Worcester Gazette, and Sports Illustrated. However, the WPI Athletic Department reaffirmed its decision and the Omniturf surface remained for its expected lifetime of 10–12 years. life The stadium underwent a major renovation before the 1997 season consisting of the installation of a new AstroTurf 12 playing surfacing and the resurfacing of the track. Ten years later in 2007, the stadium had another major renovation which included a new FieldTurf playing surface, new bleachers (decreasing capacity to 2,000) and press box on the west side of the field, a new scoreboard, and a new field lighting system. Additionally in 2007, the eight-lane track was resurfaced and named after longtime track and field coach, Merl M. Norcross, during a dedication ceremony during Homecoming. In the summer of 2015 the field was resurfaced again with FieldTurf.
