= List of current NCAA Division III football coaches =

The National Collegiate Athletic Association (NCAA) Division III includes 244 teams. Each team has one head coach. As of the 2026 season, Division III is composed of 29 conferences: the American Rivers Conference (ARC), American Southwest Conference (ASC), College Conference of Illinois and Wisconsin (CCIW), Centennial Conference, Conference of New England (CNE), Empire 8, Heartland Collegiate Athletic Conference (HCAC), Landmark Conference, Liberty League, Middle Atlantic Conferences (MAC), Massachusetts State Collegiate Athletic Conference (MASCAC), Michigan Intercollegiate Athletic Association (MIAA), Minnesota Intercollegiate Athletic Conference (MIAC), Midwest Conference (MWC), Northern Athletics Collegiate Conference (NACC), North Coast Athletic Conference (NCAC), New England Small College Athletic Conference (NESCAC), New England Women's and Men's Athletic Conference (NEWMAC), New Jersey Athletic Conference (NJAC), Northwest Conference (NWC), Ohio Athletic Conference (OAC), Old Dominion Athletic Conference (ODAC), Presidents' Athletic Conference (PAC), Southern Athletic Association (SAA), Southern Collegiate Athletic Conference (SCAC), Southern California Intercollegiate Athletic Conference (SCIAC), Upper Midwest Athletic Conference (UMAC), USA South Athletic Conference, and Wisconsin Intercollegiate Athletic Conference (WIAC), as well as one school that competes as an independent.

As of the start of the 2026 season, the longest-tenured coach in Division III, is expected to be E. J. Mills of Amherst, who has been head coach at the school since 1997. In all, 34 Division III programs have new head coaches in 2026.

Conference affiliations are current for the 2026 season. Records are current as of 7/27/26.

== Coaches ==
Team	Conference	Head coach	First season	W	L	W%	W	L	W%	Offensive coordinator(s)	Defensive coordinator(s)	Special teams coordinator(s)
Team	Conference	Head coach	First season	Current			Career			Offensive coordinator(s)	Defensive coordinator(s)	Special teams coordinator(s)
Buena Vista Beavers	ARC	Austin Dickinson	2023	7	23	.233	7	23	.233	Tom Rethman	Eric Hubbard	Vacant
Central (IA) Dutch	ARC	Jeff McMartin	2004	171	52	.767	171	52	.767	Michael Chorowicz	Cody Baethke	Vacant
Coe Kohawks	ARC	Tyler Staker	2016	69	28	.711	69	28	.711	Trevor McConnell	Reid Miller	Vacant
Dubuque Spartans	ARC	Ryan Maiuri	2024	9	11	.450	9	11	.450	Vacant	Mitch Shepherd	Jordan Edwards
Loras Duhawks	ARC	Brandon Novak	2026	0	0	–	0	0	–	Jon Powers	Hayden Sanders	Erik Bjork
Nebraska Wesleyan Prairie Wolves	ARC	Jacob Donohoe	2026	0	0	–	0	0	–	Vacant	Brandon Earp	Ethan Heifner
Simpson (IA) Storm	ARC	Reed Hoskins	2023	14	16	.467	14	16	.467	Anfernee Roberts	Jason Martinez	Caleb Barnes
Wartburg Knights	ARC	Chris Winter	2021	53	8	.869	53	8	.869	Matt Wheeler	Matt Tschetter	Vacant
East Texas Baptist Tigers	ASC	Calvin Ruzicka	2023	14	15	.483	14	15	.483	Jeb Spinney	Scott Brock	Vacant
Hardin–Simmons Cowboys	ASC	Jesse Burleson	2011	116	36	.763	116	36	.763	Jeff Whitehead	Vacant	J. J. Elkins
Howard Payne Yellow Jackets	ASC	Coby Gipson	2025	4	6	.400	4	6	.400	James Douglas III	Will Snyder	Vacant
Mary Hardin–Baylor Crusaders	ASC	Larry Harmon	2022	33	13	.717	33	13	.717	Stephen Lee	Mark Carey	Nick Brace
McMurry War Hawks	ASC	Jordan Neal	2019	24	40	.375	24	40	.375	Vacant	Correy Washington	Vacant
Schreiner Mountaineers	ASC	Keith Allen	2026	0	0	–	27	39	.409	David Jones	Shane Hallmark	Vacant
Augustana (IL) Vikings	CCIW	Steve Bell	2015	48	56	.462	160	100	.615	Keegan Jones	Brian Cochran	Vacant
Carroll (WI) Pioneers	CCIW	Mike Budziszewski	2021	26	24	.520	26	24	.520	Ken Ackerman	Garren Holley	Ben Mathias
Carthage Firebirds	CCIW	Matt Popino	2024	6	14	.300	6	14	.300	Jeff Duvendeck	Adam Weber	Vacant
Elmhurst Bluejays	CCIW	Mike Heffernan	2025	1	9	.100	17	41	.293	Jake Tahaney	Mike Passarella	Jon Bolme
Illinois Wesleyan Titans	CCIW	Jared Williamson	2025	4	6	.400	77	76	.503	Eli Kosanovich	Mike Murray	Vacant
Millikin Big Blue	CCIW	Billy Riebock	2025	3	7	.300	3	7	.300	Gunnard Twyner	Jermaine Burket	Vacant
North Central (IL) Cardinals	CCIW	Brad Spencer	2022	58	2	.967	58	2	.967	Eric Stuedemann	Shane Dierking	Clay Martin
North Park Vikings	CCIW	Kyle Rooker	2019	17	43	.283	17	43	.283	Vacant	Egan Bender / Jason Stapf	Vacant
Wheaton (IL) Thunder	CCIW	Jesse Scott	2021	48	12	.800	48	12	.800	Wyatt Lee	Mikey Swider	Vacant
Carnegie Mellon Tartans	Centennial	Ryan Larsen	2022	37	9	.804	37	9	.804	Andy Helms	Ben Gibboney	Jeff Simmons
Dickinson Red Devils	Centennial	Brad Fordyce	2017	35	47	.427	35	47	.427	Scott Knapp	Vacant	Vacant
Franklin & Marshall Diplomats	Centennial	Michael Phelan	2025	9	2	.818	9	2	.818	Matt Quattrone	Mike Furlong	Sean Moore
Gettysburg Bullets	Centennial	Michael Green	2026	0	0	–	0	0	–	Trey Kavanaugh	Zach Mallard	Shawn Magginson
Johns Hopkins Blue Jays	Centennial	Dan Wodicka	2024	24	4	.857	24	4	.857	Alex Horvatits	BJ Hill	Vacant
McDaniel Green Terror	Centennial	Skyler Fultz	2024	2	18	.100	10	21	.323	Vacant	Vacant	Vacant
Muhlenberg Mules	Centennial	Nate Milne	2018	69	16	.812	69	16	.812	Vacant	Greg Frantz	Trey Brown
Ursinus Bears	Centennial	Peter Gallagher	2001	138	110	.556	138	110	.556	Jeff Endy / Rob Quigley	Ryan DiVergilis	Vacant
Curry Colonels	CNE	Todd Parsons	2022	18	23	.439	18	23	.439	Vacant	McKinley Pippin	Vacant
Endicott Gulls	CNE	Paul McGonagle	2018	62	16	.795	74	43	.632	Vacant	Mehdi Squalli	Antonio Rossi
Husson Eagles	CNE	Nat Clark	2019	33	29	.532	33	29	.532	Greg Vreeland	Paytton Hobbs	Vacant
Maine Maritime Mariners	CNE	Nick Sheehan	2025	0	10	.000	0	10	.000	Joe O'Rourke	Aaron Kelton	Vacant
New England (ME) Nor'easters	CNE	Mike Lichten	2017	33	35	.485	48	70	.407	Tim Viall	Vacant	Alphonso Belnavis
New England (NH) Pilgrims	CNE	Kevin Kelly	2025	1	9	.100	25	72	.258	Drew Luongo	Matt Elsker	Vacant
Nichols Bison	CNE	Vinny Marino	2024	5	15	.250	5	15	.250	Vacant	Tony Brinson	Vacant
Western New England Golden Bears	CNE	Jason Lebeau	2018	48	26	.649	48	26	.649	Connor Dunn	Jake Salera	Peyton Ludemann
Alfred Saxons	Empire 8	Bob Rankl	2014	68	51	.571	68	51	.571	Matt Simon	Brady Bonacquisti	Hunter Miles
Alfred State Pioneers	Empire 8	Scott Linn	2018	31	41	.431	31	41	.431	Ethan Williams	Owen Albers	Vacant
Brockport Golden Eagles	Empire 8	Jason Mangone	2013	96	38	.716	96	38	.716	Steve Potter	Matt Arita	Matthew Szymanski
Cortland Red Dragons	Empire 8	Tom Blumenauer	2025	8	3	.727	29	14	.674	Eric Bunker	Leondre Simmon	Jack Mrozinski Jr.
Hartwick Hawks	Empire 8	Matt Rogers	2025	4	6	.400	4	6	.400	Tyler Elmore	Mark Theophel	Christian Legagneur
Morrisville Mustangs	Empire 8	Eric Jendryaszek	2025	0	10	.000	6	14	.300	Jake Orlando	Colin Schaeffer	Vacant
St. John Fisher Cardinals	Empire 8	Ed Raby Jr.	2025	7	4	.636	27	26	.509	Brees Segala	Vacant	Hayden Ricci
Utica Pioneers	Empire 8	Blaise Faggiano	2008	98	82	.544	98	82	.544	Braeden Zenelovic	Holden Whitehead	Matt Kaires
Anderson Ravens	HCAC	Jonathan Coddington	2023	4	26	.133	4	26	.133	LaMont Johnson	Chad Montgomery	Vacant
Bluffton Beavers	HCAC	Chris Hedden	2025	5	5	.500	5	5	.500	Vacant	Cody Crawford	Michael Kellogg / Matt Wilwohl
Franklin Grizzlies	HCAC	Mike Leonard	2025	134	60	.691	134	60	.691	Daniel Hill	Kenny Kuzmuk	Steve Rock
Hanover Panthers	HCAC	Matt Theobald	2016	62	37	.626	62	37	.626	Chase Burton	Vacant	Jamey Deckard
Manchester Spartans	HCAC	Vann Hunt	2023	1	29	.033	1	29	.033	Brian Staats	Alan Bowen	Vacant
Mount St. Joseph Lions	HCAC	Tyler Hopperton	2017	65	25	.722	65	25	.722	Darold Hughes / Lane Little	Rick Thompson	Billy Hug
Rose–Hulman Fightin' Engineers	HCAC	Jeff Sokol	2011	91	55	.623	91	55	.623	Lucas Skibba	Jeffrey Stanton	Vacant
Keystone Giants	Independent	Hugh Kirwan	2025	5	4	.556	5	4	.556	Dontavius Smith	Vacant	Vacant
Catholic University Cardinals	Landmark	Kory David	2026	0	0	–	0	0	–	Shawn Glosek	Drew Ehrlich	Joey Chupella
Juniata Eagles	Landmark	Blake Treadwell	2023	5	25	.167	5	25	.167	Luc Polglaze	Matthew Adolph	Josh Hutchison
Lycoming Warriors	Landmark	Mike Clark	2008	94	81	.537	94	81	.537	Greg Merchlinsky	Mark DeLucia / Steve Wiser	Brent Newton
Moravian Greyhounds	Landmark	Chris Sapp	2026	0	0	–	0	0	–	Deon Mash	Blaise Zambrano	John Menegakis
Susquehanna River Hawks	Landmark	Chris Pincince	2026	0	0	–	76	34	.691	Vacant	Tim Kologrivov	Vacant
Western Connecticut Wolves	Landmark	Kevin Jones (interim)	2025	5	5	.500	5	5	.500	Drew Hennessy	Nick Crowley	Mike Lago Sr.
Wilkes Colonels	Landmark	David Biever	2024	14	8	.636	14	8	.636	Kyle Dickerson	Chris Bantell	Devon Fink
Buffalo State Bengals	Liberty	Mike Neale	2026	0	0	–	69	32	.683	John Marzka	Vacant	Vacant
Hilbert Hawks	Liberty	John Noel	2026	0	0	–	0	0	–	Ethan Sheirer	Vacant	Vacant
Hobart Statesmen	Liberty	Kevin DeWall	2018	53	22	.707	66	39	.629	Vacant	Justin Higgins / Lazarus Morgan	Kevin McDonough
Ithaca Bombers	Liberty	Brandon Maguire	2026	0	0	–	0	0	–	Vacant	Will Margraff	James Colzie III
Rochester Yellowjackets	Liberty	Chad Martinovich	2018	23	48	.324	60	97	.382	Eric Ruest	Vacant	Vacant
RPI Engineers	Liberty	Ralph Isernia	2013	90	43	.677	90	43	.677	Pete Palczewski	Rob Barbieri	PJ Arcuri
St. Lawrence Saints	Liberty	Dan Puckhaber	2016	37	52	.416	37	52	.416	Vacant	Vacant	Dominic Centofanti
Union Garnet Chargers	Liberty	Jon Drach	2024	11	10	.524	42	31	.575	Vacant	Devin Smith	Vaughn Nichols-Taylor
Albright Lions	MAC	Shaun Weaver	2025	4	6	.400	4	6	.400	Danny Collins	Mark Fetterman	Vacant
Alvernia Golden Wolves	MAC	Steve Devlin	2026	0	0	–	0	0	–	Mike Tufaro	Vacant	Richie Roman
Delaware Valley Aggies	MAC	Bill Zwaan Jr.	2026	0	0	–	0	0	–	Osagie Osunde	Brandon Noble	Vacant
Eastern Eagles	MAC	Billy Crocker	2023	17	15	.531	17	15	.531	Nate Hinkle / Colin Scott	Matt Sutjak	Tommy Gilmore
Fairleigh Dickinson–Florham Devils	MAC	Anthony Van Curen	2022	19	23	.452	19	23	.452	Anthony Fontana	Ashley Pierre	Kamar Jorden
King's Monarchs	MAC	Mike Cebrosky	2024	15	7	.682	15	7	.682	Casey Tosches	Joe Gorton / Mickey Rehring	Tristan Howell
Lebanon Valley Flying Dutchmen	MAC	Chris Thompson	2025	6	5	.545	6	5	.545	Tyler Melhorn	Jack Beidler	Dan Beard
Misericordia Cougars	MAC	Steve Cushing	2025	7	4	.636	7	4	.636	Kyle Gallagher	Cole Dixon	Chance Meeder
Stevenson Mustangs	MAC	Josh Hoeg	2026	0	0	–	0	0	–	Ken Emmons	Cory Pietrzyk	Vacant
Widener Pride	MAC	Mike Barainyak	2019	31	32	.492	31	32	.492	Nathaniel Hogge	Nick Crowle	Evan Krawczuk
Bridgewater State Bears	MASCAC	Joe Verria	2016	54	39	.581	54	39	.581	Rene Moyen	John Gendron	Mark Lenehan
Dean Bulldogs	MASCAC	Luke Bakanowsky	2025	0	10	.000	0	10	.000	Vacant	Antonio Young	Dan McKenna
Fitchburg State Falcons	MASCAC	Izzy Abraham	2024	5	15	.250	5	15	.250	Garrett DelleChiaie / Maxwell Schiavone	Mark Sullivan	Vacant
Framingham State Rams	MASCAC	Tom Kelley	2007	134	83	.617	134	83	.617	Joe Pappagallo	Cully Curran	James Pisegna
Massachusetts Maritime Buccaneers	MASCAC	Jeremy Cameron	2005	70	127	.355	70	127	.355	Vacant	Greg Gigantino	Vacant
Plymouth State Panthers	MASCAC	Paul Castonia	2003	111	111	.500	113	139	.448	Vacant	Devin Zeman	Vacant
UMass Dartmouth Corsairs	MASCAC	Josh Sylvester	2023	25	7	.781	25	7	.781	Ryan Struthers	Steve Faniel	Vacant
Westfield State Owls	MASCAC	Lou Conte	2024	7	13	.350	10	21	.323	Vacant	Dan McCarthy	Vacant
Worcester State Lancers	MASCAC	Lazaro Mitjans Jr.	2025	3	7	.300	3	7	.300	Vacant	Corey Stefanik	Vacant
Adrian Bulldogs	MIAA	Joe Palka	2024	14	6	.700	15	15	.500	Tyler Palka	Chad O'Brien / Ron Shiels	Jeb Palka
Albion Britons	MIAA	Travis Rundle	2023	17	13	.567	26	55	.321	Stephen Wasil	Bryan Sander	Vacant
Alma Scots	MIAA	Jason Couch	2018	53	25	.679	53	25	.679	Zach Riepma	Ryan Ettinger	Scotty Cole
Calvin Knights	MIAA	Trent Figg	2024	9	11	.450	9	11	.450	Ben Dixon	Lamar Bell / Daniel Packard	Vacant
Hope Flying Dutchmen	MIAA	Peter Stuursma	2016	74	20	.787	74	20	.787	Andrew Hawken	Alex Smith	Jinks Arnold
Kalamazoo Hornets	MIAA	John Krajacic	2026	0	0	–	0	0	–	Aaron Rice	Clay Whitehead	Vacant
Olivet Comets	MIAA	Erik Ieuter	2025	1	9	.100	28	45	.384	Vacant	Casey Huhn	Doug Crawford / Derek Williams
Trine Thunder	MIAA	Troy Abbs	2015	72	36	.667	72	36	.667	Tyler Bolen / Matthew Keith	Robert Riley / Jonas Williams	Justin Engle
Augsburg Auggies	MIAC	KiJuan Ware	2025	4	6	.400	7	13	.350	Vacant	Carlton Hall / Jeff Rogers	Vacant
Bethel Royals	MIAC	Mike McElroy	2024	23	4	.852	23	4	.852	Colin Duling	Vacant	Tavian Swanson
Carleton Knights	MIAC	Tom Journell	2018	39	31	.557	90	80	.529	Alex Balogh	Sam Kent	Vacant
Concordia (Moorhead) Cobbers	MIAC	Terry Horan	2001	157	87	.643	157	87	.643	Jake Pollock	Kyle Bakken	Vacant
Gustavus Adolphus Gusties	MIAC	Peter Haugen	2009	86	74	.538	86	74	.538	Charlie Cosgrove	Landon Rauen	Derek Glynn
Hamline Pipers	MIAC	Bob Davies	2026	0	0	–	0	0	–	Michael Harris	Dennis Lee	Vacant
Macalester Scots	MIAC	Phil Nicolaides	2022	11	29	.275	11	29	.275	Matthew Reed	Kyle Artinian / Zach Hauser	Noah Bresson / Mahlon Slaughter
Saint John's (MN) Johnnies	MIAC	Gary Fasching	2013	120	22	.845	120	22	.845	Kole Heckendorf	James Herberg	Vacant
St. Olaf Oles	MIAC	James Kilian	2017	39	41	.488	39	41	.488	Matthew Paulson	Lucas Kleinschrodt	Mitchell Kleinschrodt
St. Scholastica Saints	MIAC	Matt Bremer	2025	3	7	.300	3	7	.300	Joe Gatz	CJ Butt	Brady Underwood
Beloit Buccaneers	MWC	Kyle Langhoff	2025	1	9	.100	1	9	.100	Brody Pogue	Joe Butz	Vacant
Chicago Maroons	MWC	Craig Knoche	2025	7	3	.700	7	3	.700	Daniel Gallagher	Erik Karlson	Jake Santos
Cornell (IA) Rams	MWC	Curt Ritchie	2025	4	6	.400	4	6	.400	Jake Olsen	Michael Juscik	Jim Womochil
Grinnell Pioneers	MWC	Brent Barnes	2021	10	38	.208	10	38	.208	Malcolm Gibson	Gene Blalock	Vacant
Illinois College Blueboys	MWC	Ray DeFrisco	2016	56	35	.615	56	35	.615	Sam Chilsen	Jimmy Champion	Vacant
Knox Prairie Fire	MWC	Adam Gonzaga	2026	0	0	–	0	9	.000	Dom Parello	Vacant	Kalama Kaluhiokalani
Lake Forest Foresters	MWC	Jim Catanzaro	2009	106	60	.639	106	60	.639	Vacant	Matt Williamson	Vacant
Lawrence Vikings	MWC	Daniel Galante	2026	0	0	–	0	0	–	Jason Kradman	Sean Stokes	Vacant
Luther Norse	MWC	Joe Troche	2022	3	37	.075	3	37	.075	Lars Prestemon	Vacant	Sean Finger / Khayleb Willis
Monmouth (IL) Fighting Scots	MWC	Chad Braun	2015	84	21	.800	84	21	.800	Ryan Kaltenmark	Vacant	Phil Pullen
Ripon Red Hawks	MWC	Jake Marshall	2023	14	16	.467	14	16	.467	Joe Blitstein	Mike Hepp	Mike Schmitt
Aurora Spartans	NACC	Don Beebe	2019	59	13	.819	59	13	.819	Ryan Gehlert	J. T. Zimmerman	Matt Piasecki
Benedictine Eagles	NACC	Jim Schroeder	2019	41	21	.661	49	52	.485	Vacant	Vacant	Rick Ponx
Concordia (IL) Cougars	NACC	Chase Hankins	2024	6	14	.300	6	14	.300	Charley Clark Jr.	Charlie Drewek	Seve Loubriel
Concordia (WI) Falcons	NACC	Greg Etter	2008	95	82	.537	95	82	.537	Curran White	Jeff Merritt	Vacant
Eureka Red Devils	NACC	Dion Jordan	2026	0	0	–	0	0	–	Ramces Auguste Jr.	Joshua Kaddu	Vacant
Lakeland Muskies	NACC	Colin Bruton	2015	57	48	.543	57	48	.543	Vacant	Joey Lehto	Larry Feest
Rockford Regents	NACC	Calvin Toliver	2022	8	32	.200	8	32	.200	Vacant	Matt Henning	Carl Jones
St. Norbert Green Knights	NACC	Dan McCarty	2015	72	32	.692	72	32	.692	Dennis Cooper	Rob Huberty	Bob DeKeyser
Wisconsin Lutheran Warriors	NACC	Eric Treske	2019	24	29	.453	24	29	.381	Vacant	Steve Donovan	Vacant
Denison Big Red	NCAC	Jack Hatem	2010	98	54	.645	98	54	.645	Adam Moses	Jovon Johnson	Jed Quackenbush
DePauw Tigers	NCAC	Brett Dietz	2020	51	9	.850	51	9	.850	Mason Espinosa	Ryan McElwain	Vacant
John Carroll Blue Streaks	NCAC	Brian Polian	2026	0	0	–	23	27	.460	Scott Phillips	Dean Paul	Vacant
Kenyon Owls	NCAC	Ian Good	2022	11	29	.275	11	29	.275	Nate Wilson	Ken Delgado	Gerald Callagy
Oberlin Yeomen	NCAC	John Pont	2023	2	28	.067	2	28	.067	Vacant	Ben Hammer	Roseanna Smith
Ohio Wesleyan Battling Bishops	NCAC	Tom Watts	2012	73	59	.553	73	59	.553	Hayden Thomas	Brady Thomas	Vacant
Wabash Little Giants	NCAC	Jake Gilbert	2024	9	3	.750	9	3	.750	Ken Karcher	Vacant	Tom Ferner
Washington (St. Louis) Bears	NCAC	Aaron Keen	2021	38	15	.717	85	44	.659	Vacant	Jeff Fisher	David Tolbert
Wittenberg Tigers	NCAC	BJ Coad	2026	0	0	–	0	0	–	Kennedy Cook / Jake Kennedy	Cody Cruzen	Vacant
Wooster Fighting Scots	NCAC	Austin Holter	2025	5	5	.500	5	5	.500	Kaleb Jarrett	Mason Tomblin	Parker Smith
Amherst Mammoths	NESCAC	E. J. Mills	1997	158	74	.681	158	74	.681	Malik Grove	Luke Bussard	Eddy Augustin
Bates Bobcats	NESCAC	Matt Coyne	2022	7	29	.194	7	29	.194	Owen Watrous	Matt Wehrhahn	Alec Brown
Bowdoin Polar Bears	NESCAC	B. J. Hammer	2019	13	41	.241	35	94	.271	Mike Deitrick	Kyle McAllister	Storm Jipson
Colby Mules	NESCAC	Jack Cosgrove	2018	26	36	.419	154	171	.474	Mark Clements	Liam Hobbins	Tyler Cottle
Hamilton Continentals	NESCAC	Dave Murray	2014	25	71	.260	176	170	.509	Shea Dwyer	Randi Moore	Vacant
Middlebury Panthers	NESCAC	Doug Mandigo	2023	19	8	.704	19	8	.704	Anthony Marsella	Ryan Paquette	Vacant
Trinity (CT) Bantams	NESCAC	Jeff Devanney	2006	135	25	.844	135	25	.844	Mark Melnitsky	Lewis Acquarulo	Vacant
Tufts Jumbos	NESCAC	Jay Civetti	2011	60	60	.500	60	60	.500	Mike MacDonald	Tino Lopes	Vacant
Wesleyan Cardinals	NESCAC	Dan DiCenzo	2015	63	25	.716	63	25	.716	Eric Ludwig	Adam Chicoine	Tony Collins
Williams Ephs	NESCAC	Mark Raymond	2016	42	37	.532	73	67	.521	Nick Hennessey	Mark McDonough	Ramon Mignott
Coast Guard Bears	NEWMAC	C. C. Grant	2020	22	29	.431	22	29	.431	J. B. Wells	Dana Fleischmann	Vacant
Maritime Privateers	NEWMAC	Andrew Dresner	2026	0	0	–	0	0	–	Domenic Isabell	Vacant	Tom Lindley
Merchant Marine Mariners	NEWMAC	Jameson Croall	2022	26	12	.684	26	12	.684	James Kikel	Harry Passante	Lou Scala
MIT Engineers	NEWMAC	Brian Bubna	2018	37	29	.561	37	29	.561	Tanner Kingsley	Devone Williams	Vacant
Norwich Cadets	NEWMAC	Bill Russell	2024	1	19	.050	1	19	.050	Ryan Heasley	Keith Emery	Vacant
Salve Regina Seahawks	NEWMAC	Kevin Gilmartin	2013	82	41	.667	82	41	.667	Vacant	Vacant	Vacant
Springfield Pride	NEWMAC	Mike Cerasuolo	2016	75	27	.735	75	27	.735	Vacant	Nic Keene	Vacant
WPI Engineers	NEWMAC	Chris Robertson	2010	71	82	.464	82	108	.432	Matt Kelly	Vacant	Galen Holmes
Castleton Spartans	NJAC	Tyler Higley	2024	5	15	.250	5	15	.250	Zach Brehmeyer	Lukas Carlson	Vacant
Christopher Newport Captains	NJAC	Paul Crowley	2022	31	11	.738	31	11	.738	Craig Smith	Mario Byrd	Tom Clark
Kean Cougars	NJAC	Dan Garrett	2006	87	109	.444	87	109	.444	Evan Durand	Vacant	Scott Sperone
Montclair State Red Hawks	NJAC	Mike Palazzo	2023	13	17	.433	13	17	.433	Joe LaSala	Liam Nelson	Steve Sciarappa
Rowan Profs	NJAC	Pat Ruley	2024	14	6	.690	14	6	.690	Vacant	Vacant	Andrew Kirkland
Salisbury Seagulls	NJAC	Sherman Wood	1999	203	83	.710	224	121	.649	Ryan Fleetwood	Robb Disbennett	Vacant
TCNJ Lions	NJAC	Tyler Moody	2025	6	4	.600	6	4	.600	Bobby Jones	Dean Schofield	Vacant
William Paterson Pioneers	NJAC	Edwyn Edwards	2026	0	0	–	0	0	–	Jeff Braxton	Jeff Koutsantanou	Vacant
George Fox Bruins	NWC	Spencer Crace	2025	4	6	.400	4	6	.400	Joshua Mondt	Lukkes Gilgan	Braeden Meyer
Lewis & Clark Pioneers	NWC	Brett Elliott	2025	6	4	.600	6	4	.600	Mike Machado	Daniel Fields	Vacant
Linfield Wildcats	NWC	Joseph Smith	2006	173	33	.840	173	33	.840	Vacant	Jackson Vaughan	Vacant
Pacific (OR) Boxers	NWC	Ian Falconer	2021	22	27	.449	22	27	.449	Jim Craft	John Bates	Nainoa Coelho-Lopes / Justin Leatherman
Pacific Lutheran Lutes	NWC	Brant McAdams	2018	34	37	.479	34	37	.479	Zach Willis	Mike Smith	Vacant
Puget Sound Loggers	NWC	Jeff Thomas	2010	40	104	.278	40	104	.278	David Carskie	Andrew Chau	Vacant
Whitworth Pirates	NWC	Rod Sandberg	2014	92	27	.773	92	27	.773	Bryce Missey	Mac Shaw	Alex Murphy
Willamette Bearcats	NWC	Aric Williams	2024	3	17	.150	3	17	.150	Gerardo Magaña	Tim Rude	Vacant
Baldwin Wallace Yellow Jackets	OAC	Jim Hilvert	2017	57	25	.695	124	44	.738	Vacant	Ethan Nichol	Vacant
Capital Comets	OAC	Brian Foos	2020	7	47	.130	7	47	.130	Vacant	Charles Alexander	Vacant
Heidelberg Student Princes	OAC	Scott Donaldson	2016	60	35	.632	60	35	.632	Jason Lewis	Branden Jakubcin	Vacant
Marietta Pioneers	OAC	Tom Hinkle	2026	0	0	–	0	0	–	Scott Sallach	Austin Cordova	Vacant
Mount Union Purple Raiders	OAC	Geoff Dartt	2020	67	5	.931	67	5	.931	Kevin Burke	Chris Kappas	Dan Allen
Muskingum Fighting Muskies	OAC	Matt Nardo	2025	4	6	.400	13	27	.325	Chris Shank	Vacant	Henry Flickinger
Ohio Northern Polar Bears	OAC	Andy Fries	2024	13	8	.619	13	8	.619	Vacant	Robbie Brown	Vacant
Otterbein Cardinals	OAC	Dave Marquis	2025	1	9	.100	1	9	.100	Ian Grant	Jaymar Hines	Bobby Buckler
Wilmington Quakers	OAC	Kevin Burke	2024	4	16	.200	31	69	.310	Vacant	Mark Murnyack	Brandon Farley
Averett Cougars	ODAC	Matt Quinn	2026	0	0	–	0	0	–	Vacant	Shawn Baldwin	Avery James
Bridgewater Eagles	ODAC	Scott Lemn	2021	29	22	.569	29	22	.569	Kevin Saxton II	Peyton Allen	Kevin Barr
Guilford Quakers	ODAC	Brad Davis	2020	10	41	.196	10	41	.196	Josh Baker	Khalid Jones	Jamel Warren
Hampden–Sydney Tigers	ODAC	Vince Luvara	2024	12	8	.600	12	8	.600	Max Beal	Vacant	David Clark Jr.
Randolph–Macon Yellow Jackets	ODAC	Pedro Arruza	2004	156	73	.681	156	73	.681	Nick McGee	Noah Jackson	Nicholas Barhorst
Roanoke Maroons	ODAC	Bryan Stinespring	2025	5	4	.556	5	4	.556	Mitch Ferrick	Mike Giancola	Nicholas Conte / BT Sherman
Shenandoah Hornets	ODAC	Scott Yoder	2013	72	55	.567	72	55	.567	Stan Hodgin	Kalvin Oliver	Brock McCullough
Washington and Lee Generals	ODAC	Garrett LeRose	2018	46	27	.630	46	27	.630	Mat Rapoza	Vaughn Johnson	Kenny Treschitta
Allegheny Gators	PAC	Braden Layer	2023	8	22	.267	8	22	.267	Matt Cochran	Matt Hanhold	Curtis Bailey
Bethany Bison	PAC	David Blake	2026	0	0	–	0	0	–	Chris Kiedaisch	Josh Perry	Vacant
Case Western Reserve Spartans	PAC	Greg Debeljak	2004	148	67	.688	148	67	.688	Ron Dolciato / Dereck Slesh	Warren Miller	Jeff Ramsey
Geneva Tornadoes	PAC	Tom Contenta	2026	0	0	–	0	0	–	Jason Wargo	Will Edgar	Dom Henderson
Grove City Wolverines	PAC	Andrew DiDonato	2016	67	35	.657	67	35	.657	Vacant	Dan Vogt	Bill Brest
Hiram Terriers	PAC	Xavier Dupree	2025	3	7	.300	3	7	.300	Vacant	Tanner Niles	Brock Mancini
Saint Francis Red Wolves	PAC	Chris Villarrial	2010	68	98	.410	68	98	.410	Vacant	Jacob Craig	Vacant
Saint Vincent Bearcats	PAC	Casey Goff	2025	2	8	.200	27	51	.346	Zach Shaw	Ethan Anderson / Brandon Peluso	Michael Yarosz
Thiel Tomcats	PAC	Sam Bauman	2022	8	32	.200	8	32	.200	Greg Polis	Robert Ferrazzani	Tom Keane
Washington & Jefferson Presidents	PAC	Mike Sirianni	2003	202	49	.805	202	49	.805	Andrew Cregan	Phillip Bobich	Ken Cranston
Waynesburg Yellow Jackets	PAC	Larry Wilson	2026	0	0	–	0	0	–	Vacant	Matt Tobey	Jaylin Kennedy
Westminster (PA) Titans	PAC	EJ White (interim)	2026	0	0	–	0	0	–	Vacant	Mitch Snyder	Chevy Dawson
Berry Vikings	SAA	Tony Kunczewski	2013	93	39	.705	93	39	.705	John Sikora	Joel Elliott	Vacant
Centre Colonels	SAA	Andy Frye	1998	185	93	.665	185	93	.665	Michael Orts	Carter Conley	Vacant
Maryville (TN) Scots	SAA	Ben Fox	2021	35	20	.636	35	20	.636	Michael McGuire	Scott Brumett	Vacant
Millsaps Majors	SAA	Brandon Lechtenberg	2024	11	9	.550	11	9	.550	Armani Lonardo Ball	Julian Jean-Baptiste / Taylor Martin	Robert Baxley
Rhodes Lynx	SAA	Rich Duncan	2021	18	32	.360	56	65	.463	Matt Kalb	Matt Ellis	Chris DiLella
Sewanee Tigers	SAA	Joe Freitag	2026	0	0	–	0	0	–	Nathan Graham	Cooper Gosch	Joey Vaughan
Southwestern Pirates	SAA	Bill Kriesel	2024	8	12	.400	8	12	.400	Nick Mask	Vacant	Vacant
Trinity (TX) Tigers	SAA	Jerheme Urban	2014	89	32	.736	89	32	.736	Wade Lytal	Paul Michalak	Quentin Carter
Austin Kangaroos	SCAC	Tony Joe White	2023	6	23	.207	41	44	.482	Chad O'Melia	George Love	Vacant
Centenary Gentlemen	SCAC	Byron Dawson	2023	5	14	.263	5	14	.263	Vacant	Vacant	Vacant
Gallaudet Bison	SCAC	Stefan LeFors	2025	1	8	.111	1	8	.111	Vacant	Vacant	Vacant
Hendrix Warriors	SCAC	Justin "Buck" Buchanan	2013	62	62	.500	62	62	.500	Russ Phillips	Zach Schultz	Vacant
Lyon Scots	SCAC	Chris Douglas	2020	10	42	.192	71	120	.372	Will Lawhorn	Andy Paider	Beau Parkevich / Alex Townsend
Texas Lutheran Bulldogs	SCAC	Neal LaHue	2022	21	20	.512	21	20	.512	Vacant	Tommy Holmes / Julius Scott	Vacant
Azusa Pacific Cougars	SCIAC	A.J. Parnell	2026	0	0	–	0	0	–	Mark Speckman	Thomas Webb	Vacant
Cal Lutheran Kingsmen	SCIAC	Anthony Lugo	2021	19	29	.396	19	29	.396	Vacant	Casey Blum	Matt Sciumbato
Chapman Panthers	SCIAC	Casey Shine	2025	9	3	.750	9	3	.750	Vacant	David Bishop	Izaiah Williams
Claremont-Mudd-Scripps Stags	SCIAC	Kyle Sweeney	2011	77	56	.579	81	72	.529	Tim Sternfeld	Marvin Sanders	Luke Blochowski
La Verne Leopards	SCIAC	Richard Sanchez	2025	1	8	.111	1	8	.111	John Roberts	Sid Robertson	Vacant
Pomona–Pitzer Sagehens	SCIAC	John Walsh	2016	52	35	.598	52	35	.598	Brian Carroll	Vacant	Michale Spicer
Redlands Bulldogs	SCIAC	Jim Good	2021	26	24	.520	36	54	.400	Eric Acciani	Joey Mariani	David Lord
Whittier Poets	SCIAC	Cory White	2026	0	0	–	0	0	–	Lucas Govan	Mark Odin	David Aoyagi
Crown Polars	UMAC	Anthony Franz	2021	13	37	.260	13	37	.260	Lamont Butler	Eric Shourds	Ian Parzyck / Derrick Taylor
Greenville Panthers	UMAC	Robbie Schomaker	2013	68	58	.540	68	58	.540	Ian Leib	Lee Tenenoff	Logan Kirk
Martin Luther Knights	UMAC	Paul Huebner	2022	15	25	.375	15	25	.375	Vacant	Vacant	Vacant
Minnesota Morris Cougars	UMAC	Marty Hoffmann	2017	30	53	.361	30	53	.361	Hunter Glenn	Vacant	Vacant
Northwestern (MN) Eagles	UMAC	Matt Moore	2017	42	42	.500	42	42	.500	Ken Ingram	Luke Sommerlot	Vacant
Westminster (MO) Blue Jays	UMAC	Luke Butts	2024	5	15	.250	5	15	.250	Marlon Barnett	Vacant	Will Koustmer
Belhaven Blazers	USA South	CJ Nightingale	2024	11	9	.550	11	9	.550	Josh Sheron	Vacant	Javon Harris
Brevard Tornados	USA South	Bill Khayat	2017	48	36	.571	48	36	.571	Chris Symington	Juwan Owens	Matt Helton
Greensboro Pride	USA South	Tyler Card	2021	7	43	.140	7	43	.140	Vacant	Maurice Torain	Vacant
Huntingdon Hawks	USA South	Mike Turk	2004	150	69	.685	150	69	.685	Eli Powell	Steven Hicks	Vacant
LaGrange Panthers	USA South	Wes Dodson	2023	16	15	.516	16	15	.516	Michael McCarty	Tony Talbert	Dwyan Luckey
Methodist Monarchs	USA South	Keven Williams	2016	31	61	.337	31	61	.337	Vacant	Vacant	Vacant
North Carolina Wesleyan Battling Bishops	USA South	Jeff Filkovski	2013	50	73	.407	60	113	.347	Vacant	Danny Bunn	Vacant
Southern Virginia Knights	USA South	Chris Ehorn Jr. (interim)	2026	0	0	–	0	0	–	Travis Pickup	Will Ortiz	John Martinez
Wisconsin–Eau Claire Blugolds	WIAC	Rob Erickson	2023	7	23	.233	7	23	.233	Phil Ockinga	Brady Grayvold	Deavon Puck
Wisconsin–La Crosse Eagles	WIAC	Michael Zweifel	2026	0	0	–	0	0	–	Tarek Yaeggi	Jake White	Vacant
Wisconsin–Oshkosh Titans	WIAC	Peter Jennings	2022	23	17	.575	23	17	.575	Tim Shields	Craig Stenbroten	Joe Wagner
Wisconsin–Platteville Pioneers	WIAC	Ryan Munz	2022	30	14	.682	30	14	.682	Brent Allen	Dan Bauder	Vacant
Wisconsin–River Falls Falcons	WIAC	Jake Wissing (interim)	2026	0	0	–	0	0	–	Ryley Bailey	Alex Wood	Aaron Borgerding
Wisconsin–Stevens Point Pointers	WIAC	Luke Venne	2022	7	33	.175	7	33	.175	Austin Archer	Trent LaCombe	Vacant
Wisconsin–Stout Blue Devils	WIAC	Clayt Birmingham	2010	66	85	.437	66	85	.437	Nick Pesik	Travis Destache	Vacant
Wisconsin–Whitewater Warhawks	WIAC	Jace Rindahl	2023	25	9	.735	25	9	.735	Caden Murphy	Ryan Cortez	Beau Martin

== See also ==
- List of current NCAA Division I FBS football coaches
- List of current NCAA Division I FCS football coaches
- List of current NCAA Division II football coaches
- List of current NAIA football coaches
- List of NCAA Division III football programs
