= DiDonato =

DiDonato (or Di Donato) is an Italian surname. Notable people with the surname include:

- Andrew DiDonato (born c. 1987), American college football coach
- Anthony DiDonato (1911–1989), former Democratic member of the Pennsylvania House of Representatives
- Daniele Di Donato (born 1977), Italian football manager
- Emily DiDonato (born 1991), American model
- Giacomo Di Donato (born 1988), Italian footballer
- Greg DiDonato (born 1963), American politician
- Jacques Di Donato (born 1942), French musician and improviser
- Joyce DiDonato (born 1969), American operatic mezzo-soprano
- Melissa Di Donato, American businesswoman
- Pietro di Donato (1911–1992), American writer and bricklayer
