= Pete Nyhus =

American football coach

Peter Nyhus
Coaching career (HC unless noted)
- 1960s: Gustavus Adolphus (assistant)
- 1971–1973: Valley City State

Head coaching record
- Overall: 13–13 (college)

Accomplishments and honors

Championships
- 1 NDCAC (1972)

Peter Nyhus is an American former football coach and finance executive. He served as the head football coach at Valley City State University from 1971 to 1973, compiling a record of 13–13.

Nyhus graduated from Gustavus Adolphus College in St. Peter, Minnesota, and earned a master's degree from Bemidji State College—now known as Bemidji State University—in Bemidji, Minnesota. He coached high school football in Kensington, Minnesota and St. James, Minnesota, and was an assistant football coach at his alma mater, Gustavus Adolphus, before he was hired at Valley City State in 1971 to succeed Harold Drescher. Nyhus resigned from his position at Valley City State in early 1974, and was replaced by Jim Dew.

Nyhus later worked as a finance executive, and spent time in Cancún, Mexico. He has been instrumental in recruiting many Mexicans players to the Gustavus Adolphus Golden Gusties football program during Peter Haugen's tenure as head coach.

== Head coaching record ==
=== College ===
Year	Team	Overall	Conference	Standing	Bowl/playoffs
Valley City State (North Dakota College Athletic Conference) (1971–1973)
1971	Valley City State	2–6	0–5	6th	
1972	Valley City State	5–4	4–1	T–1st	
1973	Valley City State	6–3	4–1	2nd	
Valley City State:		13–13	8–7		
Total:		13–13			
National championship Conference title Conference division title or championship game berth
