= Boardwave =

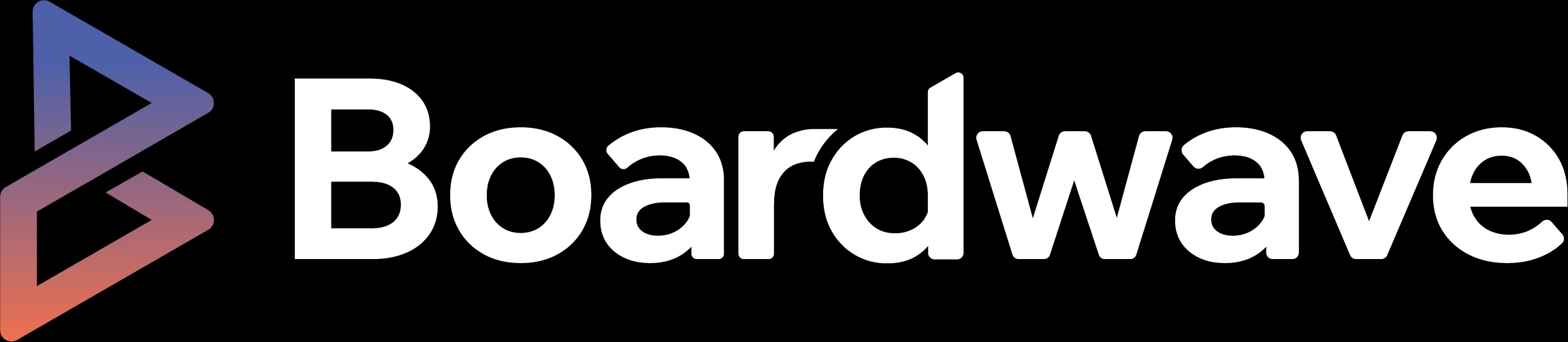
- Formation: 2022
- Founder: Phill Robinson
- Website: https://www.boardwave.org

Boardwave is a London-based impact-led organisation founded by Phill Robinson in April 2022. Boardwave was established as a community of European software entrepreneurs, Founders and CEOs to enable them to work together to accelerate their business growth and to improve the overall position of Europe as a home for global software companies. It has a launched in the UK, Netherlands, France, Germany, Italy and Spain.

Boardwave had 2,000 members as of February 2025, with 575 mentors pledging over 4500 hours of pro bono mentoring time. Boardwave’s female founder network included 350+ members across Europe. It has hosted dedicated events, such as Cash not Croissants about funding and scaling.

On 10 October 2022, it held the first Boardwave dinner debate in London on the topic of Winning big against Silicon Valley, and 270 members immediately signed up as Boardwave Mentors.

On 28 September 2023, Boardwave announced Jonathan McKay, Leo Apotheker and Elona Mortimer-Zhika as new board members. They join Phill Robinson, founder and chief executive officer (CEO) at Boardwave, along with Kath Easthope, as co-founder and chief operating officer (COO), and are supported by an advisory committee and team of high calibre founding patrons.

In March 2024, Boardwave launched a whitepaper, authored by Phill Robinson, titled “How the UK & Europe can lead the global software industry by 2034”.

Boardwave officially launched in Italy in May 2024. In September 2024, Boardwave officially launched in Spain at an event with senior Spanish figures in the software industry including Alberto Torres, Senior Advisor at McKinsey and Sarah Harmon, ex-CEO at Sngular.

On the 18th September 2024, Boardwave announced a partnership with You.com, a community for 1,700+ European software leaders, to adoption of AI in the European software industry.

As of February 2024, Boardwave is working to address the AI skills and knowledge gap along with its partner, Mindstone.

In December 2024, Boardwave launched a paper alongside the BVCA and Future Governance Forum titled ’Seizing the Scale-Up Moment’.

In September 2024, Boardwave published its first book, ''Leaders Lives'', which profiles 25 technology leaders from the UK and Europe.

In 2025, Phill Robinson stepped down as Chief Executive Officer and assumed the role of Chair, while Kath Easthope succeeded him as CEO. Jonathan McKay was appointed as a Non-Executive Director.

In June 2025, Boardwave published a report in collaboration with McKinsey & Company examining Europe’s technology ecosystem. The report highlights areas where targeted changes could aid start-up and scale-up growth, drawing on insights from European tech leaders, Boardwave’s member survey, and analysis of major software companies.

== Charity ==
European Software Leaders; Ceos, Founders, Chairs are eligible to join at no cost. Boardwave offers them a programme of networking, debates, events, mentoring, inspiration. The organisation is pan-European, and has run events in the UK, Germany, France, Belgium & Netherlands.

Each year, profit that is surplus to Boardwave's cash flow requirements is donated to medical research at Cure Parkinsons. To date Boardwave has donated £250,000 to Cure Parkinson’s, and has helped raise awareness of Parkinson’s by funding the first two series of the popular "Movers & Shakers" podcast, hosted by : Rory Cellan-Jones (also a Boardwave Patron), Jeremy Paxman, Mark Mardell, Paul Mayhew-Archer, Sir Nicholas Mostyn, Gillian Stacey-Solymar. Boardwave is also promoting the launch of the paperback edition of music legend, Tony King’s book, "The Tastemaker".

Boardwave supports the Movers & Shakers podcast series which peaked at №3 in the UK podcast charts in March 2023 and is produced by Rory Cellan-Jones, Jeremy Paxman, Mark Mardell, Sir Nicholas Mostyn, Paul Mayhew Archer, and Gillian Lacey-Solymar.

== Background ==
The organisation is backed and financed by international brands, including Advent International, Apax Partners, Bain & Co, Bank of America, Blackstone, General Atlantic, Heidrick & Struggles, Index Ventures, McKinsey, Goldman Sachs, Bain Consulting and Rothschild & Co. As of 2023, Boardwave has 80 funding partners.

== List of Founding Patrons ==
- Leo Apotheker, Chair Synchron, ex CEO SAP & HP
- Nic Humphries Exec Chair, Hg Capital
- Steve Garnett, ex-Chairperson Salesforce EMEA, Investor
- Chano Fernandez, ex co-CEO, Workday
- Stephen Kelly, CEO WANdisco, ex CEO Sage
- Melissa di Donato, NED Department science innovation and Technology, Supervisory Board Porsche AG
- Wol Kolade, Managing Partner Livingbridge, Deputy Chair NHS England, Co-Founder 10,000 Black Interns
- Jonathan McKay, NED
- Oystein Moan, Executive Chairman of Visma
- Nick Discombe, Serial Chair & NED, UK Software
- Rory Cellan-Jones, Technology Writer, Author, ex BBC technology correspondent
- Adam Hale, Board & Advisory roles around People & Technology
- Jose Duarte, CEO Infovista, & Non Exec Director
- Paul Smith, Chief Commercial Officer, ServiceNow
- Chris Bayne, CEO, The Access Group
- Gillian Wilmot CBE, Founder & CEO, Board Mentoring
- Stephanie Hutton, Fractional CMO
