= Exact (company) =

Dutch business software company

- Type: Besloten vennootschap
- Industry: Information technology, software
- Founded: 1984
- Headquarters: Delft, Netherlands
- Key people: Paul Ramakers (CEO) Eduard Hagens (Founder)
- Products: Exact Online; Exact Globe; Exact Synergy; Exact Financials
- Revenue: € 209 million (2018)
- Number of employees: 1432 (2018)
- Website: Exact

Exact is a Dutch software company that offers accounting, ERP, and other software for small and medium enterprises. Exact develops cloud-based and on-premises software for industries such as accountancy, wholesale distribution, professional services and manufacturing, serving more than 500,000 companies.

Exact, founded in 1984, has its headquarters in Delft. It has subsidiaries and offices in Europe, North America and Asia.

The company was listed on Euronext until March 2015, when it was bought up by a group of investors led by Apax and in 2019 by investor KKR.

== History ==
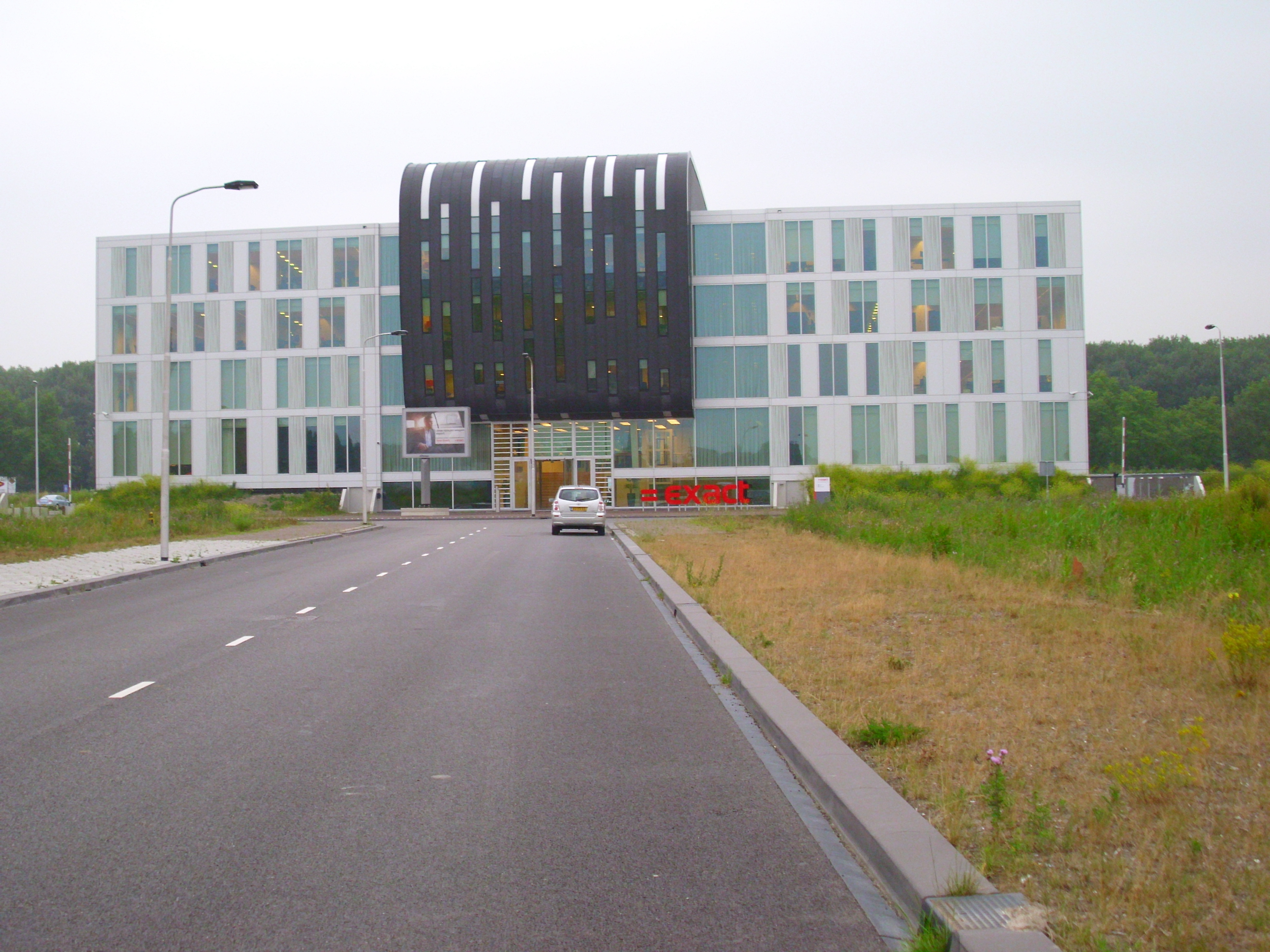
Exact Head office in Delft

Exact was founded in 1984 by Eduard Hagens, Rinus Dekker, Arco van Nieuwland, Paul van Keep, Paul Frijling and Leo Schonk. The six had worked as freelancers for Grote Beer ("Ursa Major"), one of the first Dutch companies to produce standardized accounting software. When Grote Beer fired all of its freelancers, Hagens et al. started their own business. Their Exact Software would later, in 1994, acquire Grote Beer, which at that time had an annual revenue of ƒ100 million, expanding Exact's customer portfolio to some 60,000 companies. The former company's name was used as a trade mark until 2000.

== Business ==
Internationally, Exact grew by acquiring Belgian firms Cobul and Cubic (17,000 customers) in 1989. The opening of offices in the United Kingdom and Russia meant that, as of 1995, 20% of Exact's revenue came from abroad. Expansion into the German market soon followed with the acquisition of Pcas, Bavaria Soft, Szymaniak (1997) and finally Soft Research (1999), German market leader in payroll software.

In the 2000s, Exact acquired US manufacturing ERP software providers Macola, JobBOSS and MAX. In 2007, Exact purchased Longview Solutions for US$51.5 million. Longview Solutions got sold off to Marlin Equity Partners in July 2014 for an undisclosed amount of money.

The mid-2000s saw Exact embroiled in internal power struggles. In 2004, founder Eduard Hagens returned from ten months of sailing round the world, to find his company reorganized in a decentralized way that did not suit his vision of how Exact should be led. Hagens clashed with CEO Lucas Brentjens and CFO Bert Groenewegen, leading to the resignation in September and October of that year of Brentjens, Groenewegen, and subsequently the company's entire board of directors. Hagens's "coup" (as de Volkskrant put it) caused a staff drain within the company. The following April, after the resignation of the company's new CFO, Hagens announced his own departure. He was succeeded by Rajesh Patel.

In October 2014, Exact announced a buy-out by Apax Partners. That acquisition was completed in April, 2015 for a sum of €730 million. The acquisition meant that Exact was de-listed from the Euronext stock exchange, on which it had been listed since 1999.

Exact expanded its presence to the construction sector in the spring of 2019 with the takeover of bouw7;

In 2019, Exact also added the Belgian WinBooks to the organization. WinBooks is a software company specialized in accounting and business management solutions.

In the autumn of 2020, Exact announced both the acquisition of the Belgian HR software supplier Officient and the acquisition of Unit4 Bedrijfssoftware, the business unit of Unit4 that serves the accountancy, SME and large business markets in the Netherlands and Belgium.

== Leadership ==
In 2019, Robinson announces he suffers from chronic neurological Parkinson's disease. He then continued to work as CEO, but given the further progression of the symptoms associated with the disorder, Robinson took the decision at the end of 2020 to step back and join the supervisory board as non-executive director.

Robinson's successor is Paul Ramakers. Until now, the new CEO, was COO at Exact. Ramakers has been with the company for 25 years and has held various positions over the years.

== See also ==
- Baan Corporation
