= 2024 Alfred State Pioneers football team =

American college football season

2024 Alfred State Pioneers football

ECFC champion

ECFC Championship Game, W 39–37 vs. Anna Maria

NCAA Division III First Round, L 0–44 vs. Endicott
- Conference: Eastern Collegiate Football Conference
- Record: 5–6 (2–1 ECFC)
- Head coach: Scott Linn (6th season)
- Offensive coordinator: Ethan Williams (1st season)
- Defensive coordinator: Owen Albers (1st season)
- Captains: Clay Hughes; Silas Egenlauf; David Harrell; Josh Graham
- Home stadium: Pioneer Stadium

2024 Eastern Collegiate Football Conference standings
	Conf.			Overall
Team	W		L	W		L
Alfred State y$^	2	–	1	5	–	6
Anna Maria y	2	–	1	4	–	5
Gallaudet	2	–	1	5	–	4
Dean	0	–	3	0	–	9
Championship: Alfred State 39, Anna Maria 37
$ – Conference champion; y – Championship game participant; ^ – NCAA Division III playoff participant

The 2024 Alfred State Pioneers football team represented Alfred State College as a member of the Eastern Collegiate Football Conference (ECFC) during the 2024 NCAA Division III football season. The Pioneers, led by 6th-year head coach Scott Linn, played their home games at Pioneer Stadium in Alfred, New York.

After finishing the season with a 2–1 conference record, Alfred State defeated Anna Maria 39–37 to earn the team its second-consecutive NCAA Division III playoff appearance alongside a third ECFC championship in four years.

== Schedule ==
Date	Time	Opponent	Site	TV	Result	Attendance	Source
September 7	12:00 p.m.	Anderson (IN)*	Pioneer Stadium; Alfred, NY		W 13–0	450	
September 14	7:00 p.m.	Rochester (NY)*	Pioneer Stadium; Alfred, NY		L 0–28	700	
September 21	12:00 p.m.	at MIT*	Steinbrenner Stadium; Cambridge, MA		L 0–20	412	
September 28	5:00 p.m.	at Buffalo State*	Coyer Field; Buffalo, NY		L 0–12	500	
October 5	12:00 p.m.	Apprentice*	Pioneer Stadium; Alfred, NY		W 21–7	250	
October 12	12:00 p.m.	at Curry*	Katz Field; Milton, MA		L 16–30	1,600	
October 19	4:00 p.m.	Dean	Pioneer Stadium; Alfred, NY		W 58–0	1,500	
October 26	12:00 p.m.	at Anna Maria	Caparso Field; Paxton, MA		L 23–35	375	
November 2	12:00 p.m.	Gallaudet	Pioneer Stadium; Alfred, NY		W 28–26	750	
November 16	12:00 p.m.	at Anna Maria*	Caparso Field; Paxton, MA (ECFC Championship)		W 39–37	1,200	
November 23	12:00 p.m.	at No. 10 Endicott*	Hempstead Stadium; Beverly, MA (NCAA Division III First Round)	ESPN+	L 0–44		
*Non-conference game; Rankings from D3 Poll released prior to the game; All times are in Eastern time

== Game summaries ==
=== Anderson (IN) ===
Game One – Alfred State Pioneers (0–0) vs Anderson (IN) Ravens (0–0)

Quarter	1	2	3	4	Total
Anderson (IN)	0	0	0	0	0
Alfred State	0	10	3	0	13

at Pioneer Stadium • Alfred, New York

- Date: Saturday, September 7, 2024
- Game time: 12:00 p.m. EST
- Game weather: Sunny
- Game attendance: 450

Game information

First quarter

- No scoring

Second quarter

- (11:00) ASC – Nicholas Cuomo 2 Yd Run, Alexander Caufield Kick (Alfred State 7–0)
- (0:27) ASC – Alexander Caufield 22 Yd Field Goal (Alfred State 10–0)

Third quarter

- (0:05) ASC – Alexander Caufield 27 Yd Field Goal (Alfred State 13–0)

Fourth quarter

- No scoring

Statistics	AND	ASC
First downs	9	19
Plays–yards	46–126	73–279
Rushes–yards	33	151
Passing yards	93	128
Passing: comp–att–int	11–23–0	13–24–0
Time of possession	20:43	39:17

Team	Category	Player	Statistics
Anderson (IN)	Passing	Zac Montgomery	11/23, 93 yards
Anderson (IN)	Rushing	Zac Montgomery	10 carries, 36 yards
Anderson (IN)	Receiving	Adam Dunson	2 receptions, 34 yards
Alfred State	Passing	Justin Horvath	13/24, 128 yards
Alfred State	Rushing	Josh Graham	21 carries, 96 yards
Alfred State	Receiving	Frank Tomaro	5 receptions, 53 yards

=== Rochester ===
Game Two – Alfred State Pioneers (1–0) vs Rochester Yellowjackets (1–0)

Quarter	1	2	3	4	Total
Rochester	7	21	0	0	28
Alfred State	0	0	0	0	0

at Pioneer Stadium • Alfred, New York

- Date: Saturday, September 14, 2024
- Game time: 7:00 p.m. EST
- Game weather: Sunny
- Game attendance: 700

Game information

First quarter

- (10:27) ROC – Daniel Papantonis 42 Yd Run, Jordan Laudani Kick (Rochester 7–0)

Second quarter

- (7:14) ROC – Jake Adelmann 1 Yd Run, PAT Failed (Rochester 13–0)
- (1:16) ROC – Adam Papantonis 68 Yd Pass from Ryan Rose, Jordan Laudani Kick (Rochester 20–0)
- (0:32) ROC – Jay Zheng 1 Yd Run, Daniel Papantonis 2 PT Run (Rochester 28–0)

Third quarter

- No scoring

Fourth quarter

- No scoring

Statistics	ROC	ASC
First downs	13	13
Plays–yards	56–293	70–236
Rushes–yards	92	169
Passing yards	201	67
Passing: comp–att–int	19–29–0	11–30–2
Time of possession	25:40	34:20

Team	Category	Player	Statistics
Rochester	Passing	Ryan Rose	19/29, 201 yards, 1 TD
Rochester	Rushing	Daniel Papantonis	11 carries, 59 yards, 1 TD
Rochester	Receiving	Aidan Papantonis	6 receptions, 96 yards, 1 TD
Alfred State	Passing	Justin Horvath	11/19, 67 yards, 1 INT
Alfred State	Rushing	Noah Currier	14 carries, 58 yards
Alfred State	Receiving	Noah Currier	5 receptions, 41 yards

=== At MIT ===
Game Three – Alfred State Pioneers (1–1) at MIT Engineers (1–0)

Quarter	1	2	3	4	Total
Alfred State	0	0	0	0	0
MIT	7	6	0	7	20

at Steinbrenner Stadium • Cambridge, Massachusetts

- Date: Saturday, September 21, 2024
- Game time: 12:00 p.m. EST
- Game attendance: 412
- Referee: Grant Smith

Game information

First quarter

- (9:14) MIT – Carson Phelps 5 Yd Run, Luke Pelletier Kick (MIT 7–0)

Second quarter

- (14:38) MIT – Carson Phelps 75 Yd Run, Luke Pelletier Kick Blocked (MIT 13–0)

Third quarter

- No scoring

Fourth quarter

- (4:47) MIT – Alex Theriault 2 Yd Pass from Thomas Stueber, Luke Pelletier Kick (MIT 20–0)

Statistics	ASC	MIT
First downs	8	12
Plays–yards	60–154	56–283
Rushes–yards	90	229
Passing yards	64	54
Passing: comp–att–int	11–22–3	8–15–0
Time of possession	31:08	28:52

Team	Category	Player	Statistics
Alfred State	Passing	Justin Horvath	11/22, 64 yards, 3 INT
Alfred State	Rushing	Nicholas Cuomo	8 carries, 30 yards
Alfred State	Receiving	Evan Bowen	4 receptions, 28 yards
MIT	Passing	Thomas Stueber	8/14, 54 yards, 1 TD
MIT	Rushing	Carson Phelps	27 carries, 179 yards, 2 TD
MIT	Receiving	Danie Monaghan	1 reception, 29 yards

=== At Buffalo State ===
Game Four – Alfred State Pioneers (1–2) vs Buffalo State Bengals (1–1)

Quarter	1	2	3	4	Total
Alfred State	0	0	0	0	0
Buffalo State	3	0	0	9	12

at Coyer Field • Buffalo, New York

- Date: Saturday, September 28, 2022
- Game time: 5:00 p.m. EST
- Game weather: Sunny
- Game attendance: 500
- Referee: Darin Tyson

Game information

First quarter

- (1:33) BSU – Nick Sciandra 53 Yd Field Goal (Buffalo State 3–0)

Second quarter

- No scoring

Third quarter

- No scoring

Fourth quarter

- (1:48) BSU – Amir Cameron 45 Yd Run, Nick Sciandra Kick (Buffalo State 10–0)
- (0:51) BSU – Pharrell Livingston Safety (Buffalo State 12–0)

Statistics	ASC	BSU
First downs	11	21
Plays–yards	54–160	57–323
Rushes–yards	135	227
Passing yards	25	96
Passing: comp–att–int	13–19–0	8–20–2
Time of possession	27:52	32:08

Team	Category	Player	Statistics
Alfred State	Passing	Justin Horvath	13/19, 25 yards
Alfred State	Rushing	Noah Currier	12 carries, 116 yards
Alfred State	Receiving	Noah Currier	4 receptions, 11 yards
Buffalo State	Passing	Amir Cameron	8/20, 96 yards, 2 INT
Buffalo State	Rushing	Ale Wilson	16 carries, 124 yards
Buffalo State	Receiving	Julian Maloney	1 reception, 32 yards

=== Apprentice ===
Game Five – Alfred State Pioneers (1–3) vs Apprentice Builders (2–2)

Quarter	1	2	3	4	Total
Apprentice	0	0	0	7	7
Alfred State	0	7	7	7	21

at Pioneer Stadium • Alfred, New York

- Date: Saturday, October 5, 2022
- Game time: 12:00 p.m. EST
- Game weather: Sunny
- Game attendance: 250
- Referee: Thomas Delaney

Game information

First quarter

- No scoring

Second quarter

- (13:53) ACS – Salis Egenlauf 25 Yd Interception, Alexander Caufield Kick (Alfred State 7–0)

Third quarter

- (6:42) ACS – Nicholas Cuomo 8 Yd Run, Alexander Caufield Kick (Alfred State 14–0)

Fourth quarter

- (8:21) APP – Ty Taylor 21 Yd Pass from Eduardo Rios, Logan Eastman Kick (Alfred State 14–7)
- (6:55) ACS – Josh Graham 60 Yd Run, Alexander Caufield Kick (Alfred State 21–7)

Statistics	APP	ASC
First downs	24	12
Plays–yards	75–377	43–257
Rushes–yards	44	208
Passing yards	333	49
Passing: comp–att–int	23–49–5	8–11–0
Time of possession	32:58	27:02

Team	Category	Player	Statistics
Apprentice	Passing	Eduardo Rios	11/29, 172 yards, 1 TD, 2 INT
Apprentice	Rushing	Ty Taylor	8 carries, 42 yards
Apprentice	Receiving	T. K. Petty	8 receptions, 150 yards
Alfred State	Passing	Justin Horvath	6/9, 40 yards
Alfred State	Rushing	Noah Currier	11 carries, 107 yards
Alfred State	Receiving	Rafael Class	3 receptions, 31 yards

=== At Curry ===
Game Six – Alfred State Pioneers (2–3) vs Curry Colonels (1–3)

Quarter	1	2	3	4	Total
Alfred State	0	3	0	13	16
Curry	10	3	7	10	30

at Katz Field • Milton, Massachusetts

- Date: Saturday, October 12, 2022
- Game time: 12:00 p.m. EST
- Game attendance: 1,600

Game information

First quarter

- (13:11) CUR – Jordan Depina 5 Yd Run, Omar Aboutoui Kick (Curry 7–0)
- (1:08) CUR – Omar Aboutoui 25 Yd Field Goal (Curry 10–0)

Second quarter

- (2:20) ASC – Alexander Caufield 25 Yd Field Goal (Curry 10–3)
- (0:00) CUR – Omar Aboutoui 40 Yd Field Goal (Curry 13–3)

Third quarter

- (5:24) CUR – Jaden Doman 61 Yd Pass from Michael Moriarty, Omar Aboutoui Kick (Curry 20–3)

Fourth quarter

- (9:10) ASC – Evan Bowen 79 Yd Pass from Justin Horvath, Alexander Caufield Kick Failed (Curry 20–9)
- (5:38) CUR – Colin Ridley 19 Yd Pass from Michael Moriarty, Omar Aboutoui Kick (Curry 27–9)
- (3:02) CUR – Omar Aboutoui 39 Yd Field Goal (Curry 30–9)
- (3:02) CUR – Nicholas Cuomo 1 Yd Run, Alexander Caufield Kick (Curry 30–16)

Statistics	ASC	CUR
First downs	16	20
Plays–yards	70–383	58–469
Rushes–yards	48	216
Passing yards	335	253
Passing: comp–att–int	22–36–1	11–28–0
Time of possession	30:53	29:07

Team	Category	Player	Statistics
Alfred State	Passing	Justin Horvath	20/33, 325 yards, 1 TD, 1 INT
Alfred State	Rushing	Josh Graham	11 carries, 42 yards
Alfred State	Receiving	Evan Bowen	5 receptions, 167 yards, 1 TD
Curry	Passing	Michael Moriarty	9/24, 232 yards, 2 TD
Curry	Rushing	Montie Quinn	17 carries, 149 yards
Curry	Receiving	Matthew Bowen	4 receptions, 70 yards

=== Dean ===
Game Seven – Alfred State Pioneers (2–4) vs Dean Bulldogs (0–5)

Quarter	1	2	3	4	Total
Dean	0	0	0	0	0
Alfred State	0	10	27	21	58

at Pioneer Stadium • Alfred, New York

- Date: Saturday, October 19, 2022
- Game time: 12:00 p.m. EST
- Game weather: Sunny
- Game attendance: 1,500

Game information

First quarter

No scoring

Second quarter

- (12:21) ASC – Josh Graham 7 Yd Run, Alexander Caufield Kick (Alfred State 7–0)
- (0:00) ASC – Alexander Caufield 32 Yd Field Goal (Alfred State 10–0)

Third quarter

- (14:44) ASC – Josh Graham 63 Yd Run, PAT Failed (Alfred State 16–0)
- (12:36) ASC – Noah Currier 4 Yd Run, Alexander Caufield Kick (Alfred State 23–0)
- (6:13) ASC – Nicholas Cuomo 1 Yd Run, Alexander Caufield Kick (Alfred State 30–0)
- (3:31) ASC – Nicholas Cuomo 7 Yd Run, Alexander Caufield Kick (Alfred State 37–0)

Fourth quarter

- (9:33) ASC – Josh Graham 1 Yd Run, Alexander Caufield Kick (Alfred State 44–0)
- (6:34) ASC – Jose Vargas 1 Yd Run, Alexander Caufield Kick (Alfred State 51–0)
- (1:52) ASC – Xander Hind 24 Yd Run, Alexander Caufield Kick (Alfred State 58–0)

Statistics	DEAN	ASC
First downs	12	23
Plays–yards	68–199	58–497
Rushes–yards	70	392
Passing yards	129	105
Passing: comp–att–int	8–19–1	11–17–0
Time of possession	36:40	23:20

Team	Category	Player	Statistics
Dean	Passing	Amari Harris	6/13, 83 yards, 1 INT
Dean	Rushing	Brayden Prasse	20 carries, 67 yards
Dean	Receiving	Da'Qwon	4 receptions, 76 yards
Alfred State	Passing	Justin Horvath	11/16, 105 yards
Alfred State	Rushing	Josh Graham	11 carries, 98 yards, 2 TD
Alfred State	Receiving	Evan Bowen	3 receptions, 46 yards

=== At Anna Maria ===
Game Eight – Alfred State Pioneers (3–4) vs Anna Maria Amcats (3–4)

Quarter	1	2	3	4	Total
Alfred State	3	7	7	6	23
Anna Maria	0	28	7	0	35

at Caparso Field • Paxton, Massachusetts

- Date: Saturday, October 26, 2022
- Game time: 12:00 p.m. EST

Game information

First quarter

- (5:07) ASC – Richard Brice II 25 Yd Field Goal (Alfred State 3–0)

Second quarter

- (13:42) AMC – Justin Oliver 44 Yd Pass from Ryan Russell, Ryan Kent Kick (Anna Maria 7–3)
- (11:06) ASC – Noah Currier 66 Yd Pass from Justin Horvath, Richard Brice II Kick (Alfred State 10–7)
- (11:06) AMC – Justin Oliver 25 Yd Pass from Ryan Russell, Ryan Kent Kick (Anna Maria 14–10)
- (5:42) AMC – Justin Oliver 62 Yd Pass from Ryan Russell, Ryan Kent Kick (Anna Maria 21–10)
- (0:33) AMC – Kevin Acosta Jr. 12 Yd Pass from Ryan Russell, Ryan Kent Kick (Anna Maria 28–10)

Third quarter

- (12:51) AMC – Davien Atkinson 16 Yd Pass from Ryan Russell, Ryan Kent Kick (Anna Maria 35–10)
- (5:47) ASC – Frank Tomaro 10 Yd Pass from Justin Horvath, Richard Brice II Kick (Anna Maria 35–17)

Fourth quarter

- (12:12) ASC – Noah Currier 2 Yd Run, Richard Brice II PAT Failed (Anna Maria 35–23)

Statistics	ASC	AMC
First downs	19	22
Plays–yards	67–349	60–514
Rushes–yards	95	170
Passing yards	254	335
Passing: comp–att–int	16–33–2	18–29–3
Time of possession	37:17	23:01

Team	Category	Player	Statistics
Alfred State	Passing	Justin Horvath	12/21, 208 yards, 2 TD, 2 INT
Alfred State	Rushing	Josh Graham	14 carries, 42 yards
Alfred State	Receiving	Noah Currier	5 receptions, 120 yards, 1 TD
Anna Maria	Passing	Ryan Russell	18/29, 335 yards, 5 TD, 3 INT
Anna Maria	Rushing	Ryan Russell	10 carries, 91 yards
Anna Maria	Receiving	Justin Oliver	5 receptions, 158 yards, 3 TD

=== Gallaudet ===
Game Nine – Alfred State Pioneers (3–5) vs Gallaudet Bison (3–3)

Quarter	1	2	3	4	Total
Gallaudet	7	13	0	6	26
Alfred State	0	21	0	7	28

at Pioneer Stadium • Alfred, New York

- Date: Saturday, November 2, 2022
- Game time: 12:00 p.m. EST
- Game weather: Sunny
- Game attendance: 750

Game information

First quarter

- (10:17) GAL – Jaylen Johnson 23 Yd Pass from Brandon Washington, Adem Mahassini Kick (Gallaudet 7–0)

Second quarter

- (14:16) GAL – Brandon Washington 51 Yd Run, PAT Failed (Gallaudet 13–0)
- (12:43) ASC – Nicholas Cuomo 45 Yd Run, Richard Brice II Kick (Gallaudet 13–7)
- (10:31) GAL – Brandon Washington 53 Yd Run, Adem Mahassini Kick (Gallaudet 20–7)
- (5:29) ASC – Nicholas Cuomo 1 Yd Run, Richard Brice II Kick (Gallaudet 20–14)
- (0:18) ASC – Noah Currier 5 Yd Pass from Justin Horvath, Richard Brice II Kick (Alfred State 21–20)

Third quarter

- No scoring

Fourth quarter

- (13:13) ASC – Noah Currier 8 Yd Pass from Justin Horvath, Richard Brice II Kick (Alfred State 28–20)
- (7:23) GAL – Brandon Washington 1 Yd Run, PAT Failed (Alfred State 28–26)

Statistics	GAL	ASC
First downs	17	16
Plays–yards	66–385	68–363
Rushes–yards	304	155
Passing yards	81	208
Passing: comp–att–int	4–12–3	22–34–0
Time of possession	30:48	27:51

Team	Category	Player	Statistics
Gallaudet	Passing	Brandon Washington	2/8, 53 yards, 1 TD, 1 INT
Gallaudet	Rushing	Brandon Washington	22 rushes, 187 yards, 3 TD
Gallaudet	Receiving	Jaylen Johnson	2 receptions, 49 yards, 1 TD
Alfred State	Passing	Justin Horvath	22/32, 208 yards, 2 TD
Alfred State	Rushing	Nicholas Cuomo	11 carries, 81 yards
Alfred State	Receiving	Frank Tomaro	3 receptions, 68 yards

=== At Anna Maria (ECFC Championship) ===
Game Ten – Alfred State Pioneers (4–5) vs Anna Maria (4–4)

Quarter	1	2	3	4	Total
Alfred State	6	13	14	6	39
Anna Maria	0	16	6	15	37

at Caparso Field • Paxton, Massachusetts

- Date: Saturday, November 16, 2022
- Game time: 12:00 p.m. EST
- Game weather: Temperature: 53 °F (12 °C) • Weather: Partly cloudy
- Game attendance: 1,200
- Referee: Jay Johnson

Game information

First quarter

- (4:13) ASC – Elijah Georges 39 Yd Pass from Justin Horvath, Richard Brice II PAT Failed (Alfred State 6–0)

Second quarter

- (12:06) ASC – Nicholas Cuomo 7 Yd Run, Richard Brice II Kick (Alfred State 13–0)
- (5:21) ASC – Nicholas Cuomo 2 Yd Run, Richard Brice II PAT Failed (Alfred State 19–0)
- (5:21) AMC – Di'Angelo Jean Pierre 97 Yd PAT Return (Alfred State 19–2)
- (2:59) AMC – David Robinson 6 Yd Pass from Ryan Russell, Ryan Kent Kick (Alfred State 19–9)
- (1:12) AMC – Justin Oliver 75 Yd Pass from Ryan Russell, Ryan Kent Kick (Alfred State 19–16)

Third quarter

- (10:54) ASC – Elijah Georges 33 Yd Pass from Justin Horvath, Richard Brice II Kick (Alfred State 26–16)
- (7:07) AMC – David Robinson 31 Yd Pass from Ryan Russell, Ryan Kent PAT Failed (Alfred State 26–22)
- (2:18) ASC – Matthew Mancuso 23 Yd Pass from Justin Horvath, Richard Brice II Kick (Alfred State 33–22)

Fourth quarter

- (6:10) ASC – Josh Graham 3 Yd Run, Richard Brice II PAT Failed (Alfred State 39–22)
- (4:10) AMC – Justin Oliver 12 Yd Pass from Ryan Russell, Ryan Kent Kick (Alfred State 39–29)
- (0:22) AMC – Ryan Russell 8 Yd Run, Ryan Russell 2 PT Run (Alfred State 39–37)

Statistics	ASC	AMC
First downs	29	24
Plays–yards	70–464	61–465
Rushes–yards	220	107
Passing yards	244	358
Passing: comp–att–int	14–28–0	24–39–2
Time of possession	34:26	25:34

Team	Category	Player	Statistics
Alfred State	Passing	Justin Horvath	13/27, 235 yards, 3 TD
Alfred State	Rushing	Noah Currier	12 carries, 80 yards
Alfred State	Receiving	Elijah Georges	2 receptions, 72 yards, 2 TD
Anna Maria	Passing	Ryan Russell	24/39, 358 yards, 4 TD, 2 INT
Anna Maria	Rushing	Ryan Russell	12 carries, 74 yards, 1 TD
Anna Maria	Receiving	Justin Oliver	7 receptions, 150 yards, 2 TD

=== At No. 10 Endicott (NCAA Division III First Round) ===
Game Eleven – Alfred State Pioneers (5–5) vs No. 10 Endicott Gulls (9–1)

Quarter	1	2	3	4	Total
Alfred State	0	0	0	0	0
No. 10 Endicott	3	13	7	21	44

at Hempstead Stadium • Beverly, Massachusetts

- Date: Saturday, November 23, 2022
- Game time: 12:00 p.m. EST
- Game weather: Temperature: 44 °F (7 °C) • Weather: Windy; rainy
- Game attendance: 585
- Referee: Brian Finn
- TV: ESPN+

Game information

First quarter

- (1:37) END – Mike Bartley 24 Yd Field Goal (Endicott 3–0)

Second quarter

- (5:22) END – Bryan Metayer 1 Yd Run, PAT Failed (Endicott 9–0)
- (0:06) END – Jayson Little 6 Yd Pass from Clayton Marengi, Mike Bartley Kick (Endicott 16–0)

Third quarter

- (1:09) END – Zachariah Twardosky 25 Yd Interception, Ryan Smith Kick (Endicott 23–0)

Fourth quarter

- (12:34) END – Clayton Marengi 64 Yd Run, Ryan Smith Kick (Endicott 30–0)
- (4:59) END – Michael O'Brien 4 Yd Run, Ryan Smith Kick (Endicott 37–0)
- (2:36) END – Michael O'Brien 48 Yd Run, Ryan Smith Kick (Endicott 44–0)

Statistics	ASC	END
First downs	15	26
Plays–yards	61–186	77–504
Rushes–yards	85	343
Passing yards	101	161
Passing: comp–att–int	17–38–2	16–31–0
Time of possession	28:06	31:54

Team	Category	Player	Statistics
Alfred State	Passing	Justin Horvath	16/35, 97 yards, 2 INT
Alfred State	Rushing	Chase Shepanski	10 carries, 57 yards
Alfred State	Receiving	Josh Graham	4 receptions, 43 yards
No. 10 Endicott	Passing	Clayton Marengi	15/26, 159 yards, 1 TD
No. 10 Endicott	Rushing	Yavier Cosme-Diaz	20 carries, 118 yards
No. 10 Endicott	Receiving	Adam Goodfellow	3 receptions, 48 yards

== Personnel ==
=== Roster ===
2024 Alfred State Pioneers football team roster
Players
Coaches
Offense

Pos.	#	Name	Class
QB	1	Chase Shepanski	Fr
RB	4	Josh Graham	Sr
QB	5	Kane Patterson	Fr
WR	6	Matthew Mancuso	Jr
WR	7	Jacob Robinson	Jr
TE	8	Salvatore Ragolia	Sr
WR	11	Ethan Robles	Jr
QB	12	Dah'Mieyon Paulin	Fr
QB	14	Justin Horvath	Jr
WR	16	Rafael Class	Jr
QB	18	Richard Brice II	So
RB	24	Jose Vargas	Fr
WR	25	Nigel McDuffie	Fr
RB	26	Nicholas Cuomo	So
TE	28	Nick Valentino	Sr
RB	32	Isaiah Wise	Fr
RB	34	Jack Mahar	Fr
RB	36	Noah Currier	So
RB	37	Xander Hind	So
TE	41	Anthony Valentino	Fr
OL	55	Caleb Karp	So
C	60	Daniel Gonzalez	Sr
OL	61	Garrett Straton	Fr
OL	62	Shawn Patrie	Sr
C	65	Gabe DiGrougio	Fr
OL	67	Tyler Valenti	Fr
LG	68	Anthony Addotta	Jr
OT	71	Maxwell Clar	So
G	72	Eagan Enke	Sr
OL	73	Michael Ramos	So
C	74	Daniel Warner	Sr
OT	76	Akinde Bryan	So
OL	77	Sean Carey	Sr
OL	78	Clay Hughes	Sr
OL	79	Ezekial Robertson	So
WR	80	Evan Bowen	Fr
WR	81	Sean McFarland	Fr
WR	82	Joseph Santos	Fr
WR	83	Timothy Moorer Jr.	Fr
WR	84	Ryan Willett	Fr
WR	85	Anthony Burke	Fr
WR	86	Elijah Georges	Fr
TE	87	Frank Tomaro	So
TE	88	Liam Rogers	Fr
TE	89	Zion Sanchez	Sr
OL	97	Jose-Luis Regalado	Jr
WR		David Barrett	Fr
WR		Joshua Campbell	Fr
QB		Gage Cotton	Fr
WR		Talan Green	Fr

Defense

Pos.	#	Name	Class
LB	0	Ian Gaskin	Sr
DB	2	Nick Johnson	Sr
LB	3	David Harrell	Sr
DE	5	Greyson Maloney	Sr
DB	9	Kaden Blackman	Fr
DE	10	Josh Borowicz	Sr
DB	12	Marcos Quinteros	Fr
DB	13	Lawrence Joyner	Fr
DB	15	Marlon Edwards Jr.	Fr
LB	17	Jordan Lutz	So
DB	19	Taysir Briggs	So
DB	21	Chris Bergman	So
DB	22	Noah Cudzilo	Fr
DB	23	Chance Moultrie	Fr
LB	25	Josh Mallabar	Jr
DB	27	Knicar Lewis	So
DB	39	Michael Savino	Fr
DB	40	Donnell Hall	So
DE	42	Christian Barton	Jr
LB	43	Gage Cornell	Fr
LB	44	Andrew Gelderman	Fr
LB	45	Aaron Ellis	Fr
DB	46	Ryan Batson	Sr
LB	48	Declan Nestor	So
LB	50	Silas Egenlauf	Sr
LB	51	Connor Scott	So
DL	52	Conner McWilliams	Jr
DL	53	Jack Komarisky	Sr
LB	54	Colin Hebbard	Sr
LB	56	Josiah Auguste	Fr
DL	56	Daniel Baughn	Jr
DL	57	Adrian Jamieson	So
LB	58	Zachery Hornquist	Fr
DL	59	Javeon McLaurin-Piper	Fr
DL	66	Phyllip Knowles	Jr
DT	75	Xavier King	Fr
DE	90	Connor Gorr	Sr
DL	91	James Duffy	Jr
DE	92	John Izzo	So
DL	93	Taylor Rhett	Fr
LB	94	Christopher Thomison	Fr
LB	95	Sean Clouden	Fr
DL	96	Brian Hurlbut	So
DT	98	Dominic Akers	Fr
NT	99	Nathaniel Garcia	Fr
DL		Anthony Letta	Fr
DB		Jacob Smith	So
DL		Aidan Towsley	Fr
DB		Quinnten Wprkman	Fr

Special teams

Pos.	#	Name	Class
PK	33	Alexander Mayen	Jr
PK/P	47	Alexander Caufield	Fr
LS	49	Connor Younger	Fr
PK		Chase Brummer	Fr

Head coach

- Scott Linn

Coordinators/assistant coaches

- Ethan Williams
  (Offensive coordinator)
- Owen Albers
  (Defensive coordinator)
- Dave Mears
  (Tight ends coach)
- Barry Young
  (Wide Receivers coach)
- Evan Enke
  (Linebackers coach)
- Joe Gibson
  (Defensive line coach)
- Blaine Phillips
  (Defensive backs coach)

Legend

- (C) Team captain
- (S) Suspended
- (I) Ineligible
- Injured
- Redshirt

Roster
Last update: November 18, 2024
