= Phill Robinson =

British businessman

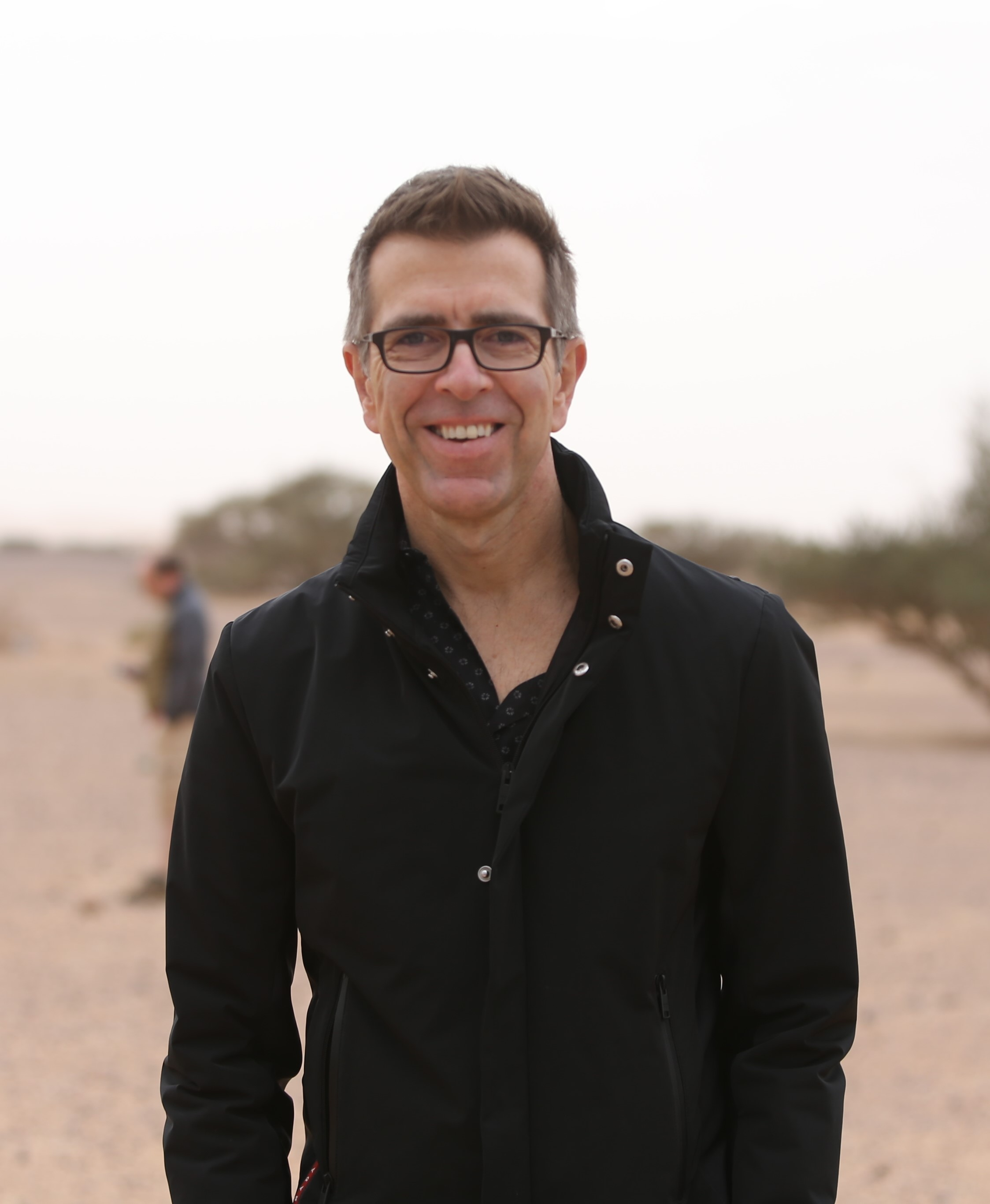
- Born: November 21, 1965 (age 60); Leicester, England
- Citizenship: United Kingdom
- Known for: Founder and CEO of Boardwave

Phill Robinson (born 21 November 1965) is a British businessman and the founder and CEO of Boardwave, a European networking community for software CEOs and Investors. He is the former chief executive officer of IRIS Software Group and Exact Software in the Netherlands. He was also Chief Marketing Officer at Salesforce.com.

== Early life ==
He was born in Leicester, England and attended Rawlins Community College and comprehensive school, in Quorn. Robinson received a BSc in Computer Science from Coventry Polytechnic, now Coventry University, in 1988. After graduating he joined Oracle Corporation. A year later he moved to Silicon Valley.

== Career ==
Robinson has 37 years leadership experience in the software industry. He served in the management teams of a number of international software firms in both Europe and the US. With Oracle (1987 – 1990) he started as a graduate consultant and after a year moved to Redwood Shores, California to prepare and Oracle's first MRP software package, known as Oracle Manufacturing for launch in the US. He returned to the UK two years later, to introduce the product into the UK & European market. In 1990, he moved to Sybase, a RDBMS (Relational Database Management System) competitor to Oracle where he switched from a technical management position into marketing, laterly running their European Product Marketing team. Robinson was subsequently part of the founding team in Europe, of Siebel Systems (1996 – 2003), a pioneer of CRM (Customer Relationship Management) Software. Robinson remained at Siebel for 7 years, helping to grow the European business from six people to well over 2000, and establish CRM as a new business software category in the region. Robinson's final role at Siebel Systems was VP International Marketing and Alliances. Robinson left to join Salesforce (2003 – 2007), the first application software available in the cloud, where he was part of a team that launched the company in Europe. He was promoted by Marc Benioff, (CEO & Chair) to Chief Marketing Officer in 2004, and once more, moved to San Francisco to pursue the role. Following the success of Salesforce, Siebel was acquired by Oracle for £5.85bn in 2005. During this time, Salesforce.com completed its IPO.

On return to the UK, Robinson was appointed CEO of Velocix, formerly CacheLogic (2007 – 2008), a Venture Capital backed internet-based video content delivery network. Robinson's remit was to commercialise the proposition and, bring the product to market. He initiated a partnership with Verizon and early trials with the BBC for its recently launched iPlayer. However, after 18 months of increasing video delivery traffic on the network, Robinson clashed with investors over product investment levels, and resigned. The business was subsequently sold to Alcatel Lucent.

Robinson joined IRIS Software (2009 – 2017), one of Europe's largest Private Equity backed software companies. He was responsible for its Accountancy Software Division, and led the spin-out of the Accountancy business, from the Group in 2011. Through the sale of the business by Hellman Friedman to Hg, the new company inherited the use of the IRIS brand, and operated as an independent business, to the former Group. As CEO Robinson tripled the size of the business over four years through organic growth and M&A. In 2016 Robinson was appointed chair of the business and worked alongside this as an Operating Partner for Hg. This role included a stint as Interim CEO of Achilles.

Robinson was appointed CEO of Exact Software in the Netherlands by APAX Partners (a private equity firm) in September 2017. In parallel, he was diagnosed with Parkinson's Disease also in September 2017. Undeterred, he remained CEO of Exact and under APAX Partners ownership, Robinson restructured the business in 2018. He then led the sale of Exact Software to another leading Private Equity firm, KKR, in 2019 for 1.65bn euros.

Under Robinson's leadership, in 2020, Exact acquired the domestic business, in the Netherlands, of its long-time competitor, Unit4. Robinson managed a leadership transition in 2020, with Exact Software’s COO, Paul Ramakers becoming CEO. Robinson remained on the supervisory board and was Chair of the Remuneration Committee until January 2025.

In April 2022, Robinson founded Boardwave, a social enterprise aimed at bringing together software leaders in Europe. By July 2025, the Boardwave community had grown to 2250 Founders, CEOs and Software Leaders, representing almost every country in Europe. Boardwave is a European community & ecosystem that creates the same conditions for success for all European software companies, that have existed in the US, Silicon Valley and other global regions for 20 years. And has a 10-year vision to move Europe from a laggard to a leader in the sector. Boardwave provides (at no cost to members); networking, coaching, mentoring, and professional development for its members.

Boardwave provides leaders with resources, networking, mentorship, professional development & coaching and improves access to capital. It is backed by a consortium of over 80 funding partners, including 30 leading software investors in Venture and Private Equity, and over 100 Angel Investors. Through partner funding, Boardwave is able to make it community services free for all qualifying software leaders throughout the region.

He is currently the Chair of the Software Advisory Board for Livingbridge, a UK Private Equity firm. Advisor Upliift Software (formerly known as Expedition Holdings Ltd) and a member of the Cure Parkinsons’ Development Board.

In January 2025, Robinson was named as ‘the most connected man in UK tech’ by Entrepreneur Magazine.

== Published works ==
In March 2024, Phill Robinson authored a whitepaper for Boardwave titled “How the UK & Europe can lead the global software industry by 2034” endorsed and supported by over 150 high profile European software leaders.

“Rebuilding The Nation: A Mountain To Scale 04”. (Contributor) Collaborating with the Future Governance Forum and the BVCA to produce this UK-based report.

Europe’s Moonshot Moment: Fueling Its Tech Ecosystem to Scale (Contributor). Collaboration between with McKinsey on the opportunity for European software companies ove the next 10 years.

Leaders Lives (Co-Author & Publisher), This was an 18-month passion project. The book addresses the perception that Europe lacks role models compared to Silicon Valley, by profiling 25 tech leaders from the UK & Europe.

== Health ==
Robinson was diagnosed with Parkinson's Disease in Sept 2017, having lost his sense of smell 4 years earlier, his Young Onset Parkinsons journey began in 2013. Due to the progression of Parkinsons he stepped down as CEO Exact in 2021, and returned to the UK, where he joined the Development Board of Cure Parkinsons, focussed on funding research for a cure.

After a routine medical in late 2024, he underwent heart bypass surgery in January 2025. Following extended medical leave, he returned to Boardwave as Chairman, rather than CEO.

== Charity and philanthropy ==
Following his Parkinson's Diagnosis in 2017, Robinson led a campaign in the Netherlands to raise awareness of the symptoms of Young Onset Parkinson's and issues with Parkinson's’ in the workplace. Particularly focusing on prejudice experienced by people with Parkinsons’ and other chronic diseases.

Once he returned to the UK, Robinson became Chair of the Development Board for Cure Parkinsons’. This Advisory group was set up to raise the profile of Cure Parkinson's and its research work, and develop and identify new funding channels so that curative research could be undertaken more quickly. He subsequently joined the Board of Trustees in late 2023, and remains a member of the Development Board today.

Each year, profit that is surplus to Boardwave's cash flow requirements is donated to medical research at Cure Parkinson's, to date the organisation has donated £300,000 directly, and a further £100,000 indirectly. Robinson’s work for Boardwave is pro bono, enabling the organisation to donate more fund to Parkinson’s research.

Boardwave also funds the award-winning Movers & Shakers podcast, on behalf of Cure Parkinson’s. The show is in its sixth series, and has been successful in raising the profile and awareness of Parkinson’s and was the winner of the Broadcasting Press Guild Award 2024 for Best Podcast of the Year.

== Personal life ==
Phill is married to Jessica Delaney Robinson. He has 3 daughters from a previous relationship, 2 step-daughters, and a dog named Jasper.
