= Keystone Giants football =

- First season: 1936; 90 years ago
- Athletic director: Lori Hendricks
- Head coach: Hugh Kirwan; 1st season, 1–2 (.333)
- Location: La Plume, Pennsylvania
- Field: Turf Field Complex
- NCAA division: Division III
- Conference: Independent
- Colors: Blue and orange
- All-time record: 24–47 (.338)
- Mascot: Giant
- Website: gokcgiants.com

The Keystone Giants football team represents Keystone College in college football at the NCAA Division III level. The Giants compete as an Independent, fielding its team as such since 2025. The Giants play their home games at the Turf Field Complex in La Plume, Pennsylvania.

Their head coach is Hugh Kirwan, who took over the position in 2025.

== Conference affiliations ==
- Independent (1936–1945, 1947–1948, 2025–present)
- National Club Football Association (2019)
- Eastern Collegiate Football Conference (2021–2022)
- Landmark Conference (2023–2024)

== List of head coaches ==
=== Key ===
Key to symbols in coaches list
General		Overall		Conference		Postseason (Note: Although the first Rose Bowl Game was played in 1902, it has been continuously played since the 1916 game, and is recognized as the oldest bowl game by the NCAA. "—" indicates any season prior to 1916 when postseason games were not played.)	
No.	Order of coaches (Note: A running total of the number of head coaches, with coaches who served separate tenures being counted only once. Interim head coaches are represented with "Int" and are not counted in the running total. "—" indicates the team played but either without a coach or no coach is on record. "X" indicates an interim year without play.)	GC	Games coached	CW	Conference wins	PW	Postseason wins
DC	Division championships	OW	Overall wins	CL	Conference losses	PL	Postseason losses
CC	Conference championships	OL	Overall losses	CT	Conference ties	PT	Postseason ties
NC	National championships	OT	Overall ties (Note: Overtime rules in college football were introduced in 1996, making ties impossible in the period since.)	C%	Conference winning percentage		
†	Elected to the College Football Hall of Fame	O%	Overall winning percentage (Note: When computing the win–loss percentage, a tie counts as half a win and half a loss.)				

=== Coaches ===
List of head football coaches showing season(s) coached, overall records, conference records, postseason records, championships and selected awards
No.	Name	Season(s)	GC	OW	OL	OT	O%	CW	CL	CT	C%	PW	PL	PT	DC	CC	NC	Awards
1	Sam Lee	1936, 1942–1943	20	5	11	0	0.313	–	–	–	–	–	–	–	–	–	–	–
2	George Azar Jr.	1937–1941	31	12	17	2	0.419	–	–	–	–	–	–	–	–	–	–	–
3	S. William Dowey	1944–1945	4	1	3	0	0.250	–	–	–	–	–	–	–	–	–	–	–
4	Bob Lamoreaux / John Franklin	1947–1948	13	6	6	1	0.500	–	–	–	–	–	–	–	–	–	–	–
5	Justin Higgins	2019–present	13	3	17	0	0.150	–	–	–	–	–	–	–	–	–	–	–

== Year-by-year results ==
National champions	Conference champions	Bowl game berth	Playoff berth

Season	Year	Head Coach	Association	Division	Conference	Record							Postseason	Final ranking
Season	Year	Head Coach	Association	Division	Conference	Overall			Conference				Postseason	Final ranking
Season	Year	Head Coach	Association	Division	Conference	Win	Loss	Tie	Finish	Win	Loss	Tie	Postseason	Final ranking
Keystone Giants
1936	1936	Sam Lee	NCAA	–	–	2	4	0					—	—
1937	1937	George Azar Jr.	NCAA	–	–	1	5	0					—	—
1938	1938	George Azar Jr.	NCAA	–	–	4	1	1					—	—
1939	1939	George Azar Jr.	NCAA	–	–	4	3	0					—	—
1940	1940	George Azar Jr.	NCAA	–	–	2	4	0					—	—
1941	1941	George Azar Jr.	NCAA	–	–	1	4	1					—	—
1942	1942	Sam Lee	NCAA	–	–	0	6	0					—	—
1943	1943	Sam Lee	NCAA	–	–	3	1	0					—	—
1944	1944	S. William Dowey	NCAA	–	–	0	2	0					—	—
1945	1945	S. William Dowey	NCAA	–	–	1	1	0					—	—
No team in 1946
1947	1947	Bob Lamoreaux / John Franklin	NCAA	–	–	3	3	1					—	—
1948	1948	Bob Lamoreaux / John Franklin	NCAA	–	–	3	3	0					—	—
No team from 1949–2018
2019	2019	Justin Higgins	National Club Football Association			3	4	0					—	—
Season canceled due to COVID-19
2021	2021	Justin Higgins	NCAA	Division III	ECFC	0	10	0	7th	0	6	0	—	—
2022	2022	Justin Higgins	NCAA	Division III	ECFC	3	7	0	5th	3	3	0	—	—
2023	2023	Justin Higgins	NCAA	Division III	ECFC								—	—
