= Tanner Kingsley =

American football coach (born c. 1996)

Current position
- Title: Offensive coordinator & quarterbacks coach
- Team: MIT
- Conference: NEWMAC

Biographical details
- Born: c. 1996 (age 29–30); Beacon Falls, Connecticut, U.S.
- Education: Anna Maria College (2020)

Playing career
- 2015–2018: Central Connecticut
- 2019: Anna Maria
- Position: Quarterback

Coaching career (HC unless noted)
- 2020–2021: Anna Maria (QB)
- 2022–2023: Anna Maria (OC/QB)
- 2024: Anna Maria (assoc. HC/OC/QB)
- 2025: Anna Maria
- 2026–present: MIT (OC/QB)

Head coaching record
- Overall: 7–3

Accomplishments and honors

Awards
- ECFC Assistant Coach of the Year (2023)

Tanner Kingsley (born c. 1996) is an American college football coach. He is the offensive coordinator and quarterbacks coach for the Massachusetts Institute of Technology, positions he has held since 2026. He was the head football coach for Anna Maria College in 2025. He played college football for Central Connecticut and Anna Maria as a quarterback.

Kingsley attended Woodland Regional High School and was named the school's athlete of the decade in 2020.

== Head coaching record ==
Year	Team	Overall	Conference	Standing	Bowl/playoffs
Anna Maria Amcats (Massachusetts State Collegiate Athletic Conference) (2025)
2025	Anna Maria	7–3	7–2	T–1st	
Anna Maria:		7–3	7–2		
Total:		7–3			
