= Justin "Buck" Buchanan =

American football coach

Current position
- Title: Head coach
- Team: Hendrix
- Conference: SCAC
- Record: 62–62

Playing career
- 1994–1997: Austin
- Position: Defensive lineman

Coaching career (HC unless noted)
- 1998–1999: Austin (DL)
- 2006–2011: Louisiana College (AHC)
- 2013–present: Hendrix

Head coaching record
- Overall: 62–62
- Tournaments: 0–1 (NCAA D-III playoffs)

Accomplishments and honors

Championships
- 1 SAA (2015)

Justin "Buck" Buchanan is an American college football coach. He is the head football coach for Hendrix College, a position he has held since 2013 where he rebooted a program that had been dormant since 1960.

== Head coaching record ==
Year	Team	Overall	Conference	Standing	Bowl/playoffs
Hendrix Warriors (Southern Athletic Association) (2013–2024)
2013	Hendrix	3–7	1–5	6th	
2014	Hendrix	5–4	3–3	T–3rd	
2015	Hendrix	8–3	7–1	1st	L NCAA Division III First Round
2016	Hendrix	7–3	5–3	4th	
2017	Hendrix	8–2	6–2	3rd	
2018	Hendrix	2–8	1–7	9th	
2019	Hendrix	7–3	5–3	4th	
2020–21	Hendrix	3–1	3–1	T–2nd	
2021	Hendrix	3–7	2–5	T–5th	
2022	Hendrix	3–7	2–5	T–6th	
2023	Hendrix	3–7	3–5	T–5th	
2024	Hendrix	4–6	2–5	T–5th	
Hendrix Warriors (Southern Collegiate Athletic Conference) (2025–present)
2025	Hendrix	6–4	3–2	3rd	
2026	Hendrix	0–0	0–0		
Hendrix:		62–62	43–47		
Total:		62–62			
National championship Conference title Conference division title or championship game berth
