= Western New England Golden Bears football =

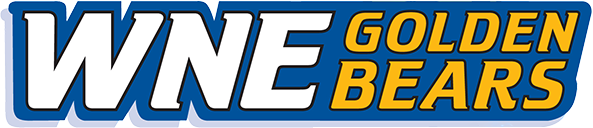
- First season: 1970
- Head coach: Jason Lebeau; 7th season, 48–26 (.649)
- Location: Springfield, Massachusetts
- Stadium: Golden Bear Stadium (capacity: 2,000)
- Conference: CNE
- Colors: Blue and yellow
- All-time record: 232–237–4 (.495)
- Bowl record: 2–1 (.667)

Conference championships
- 6

Conference division championships
- 2
- Website: wnegoldenbears.com/football

The Western New England Golden Bears football team is a college football that competes as part of National Collegiate Athletic Association (NCAA) Division III, representing Western New England University in the Conference of New England (CNE).

== Championships ==
=== Conference championships ===
Western New England claims 6 conference titles, the most recent of which came in 2019.

Year	Conference	Overall Record	Conference Record	Coach
2011	New England Football Conference	10–2	7–0	Keith Emery
2015	New England Football Conference	10–1	7–0	Keith Emery
2016	New England Football Conference	11–1	7–0	Keith Emery
2017	Commonwealth Coast Football	8–3	5–0	Keith Emery
2018†	Commonwealth Coast Football	8–3	5–1	Jason Lebeau
2019	Commonwealth Coast Football	9–2	7–0	Jason Lebeau

† Co-champions

=== Division championships ===
Western New England claims 2 division titles, the most recent of which came in 2011.

Year	Division	Coach	Overall Record	Conference Record	Opponent	CG result
2010†	NEFC Boyd	Keith Emery	9–2	6–1	N/A lost tiebreaker to Endicott	
2011	NEFC Boyd	Keith Emery	10–2	7–0	Framingham State	W 20–13

† Co-champions

== Postseason games ==
=== NCAA Division III playoff games ===
Western New England has appeared in the Division III playoffs six times, with an overall record of 1–6.

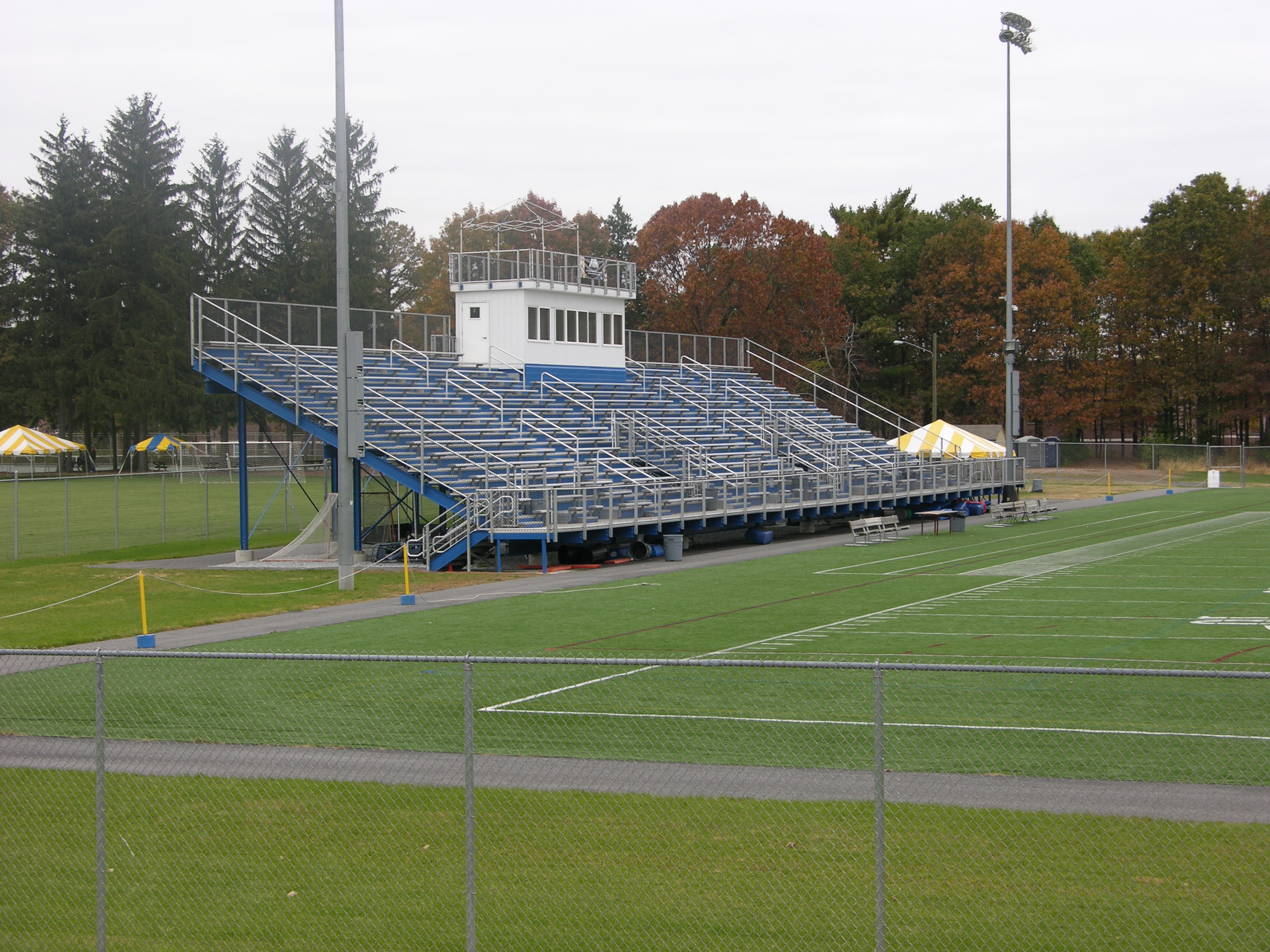
Golden Bear Stadium, venue

Year	Round	Opponent	Result
2011	First Round	Salisbury	L, 24–62
2015	First Round	Johns Hopkins	L, 20–52
2016	First Round; Second Round	Hartwick; Alfred	W, 44–27; L, 24–30
2017	First Round	Delaware Valley	L, 0–35
2018	First Round	Frostburg State	L, 24–42
2019	First Round	Brockport	L, 28–33

=== Bowl games ===
Western New England has participated in three bowl games, and has a record of 2–1.

Season	Coach	Bowl	Opponent	Result
2010	Keith Emery	ECAC Bowl	Maine Maritime	W 66–41
2021	Jason Lebeau	New England Bowl	Merchant Marine	L 35–63
2023	Jason Lebeau	New England Bowl	UMass Dartmouth	W 37–7
