= Jack Hatem =

American football coach (born c. 1961)

Current position
- Title: Head coach
- Team: Denison
- Conference: NCAC
- Record: 98–54

Biographical details
- Born: c. 1961 (age 64–65); Lancaster, Ohio, U.S.
- Education: University of Rio Grande (1982); Ohio University (1992)

Coaching career (HC unless noted)

Football
- 1986–1991: Bishop Watterson HS (OH) (assistant)
- 1992–1994: Fisher Catholic HS (OH)
- 1995–1997: Highland HS (OH)
- 1998–2004: New Albany HS (OH)
- 2005–2006: Denison (DB)
- 2007–2009: Denison (DC)
- 2010–present: Denison

Baseball
- 1983–1985: Rio Grande
- 1986–1991: Bishop Watterson HS (OH)

Head coaching record
- Overall: 98–54 (college football)
- Tournaments: 0–1 (NCAA D-III playoffs)

Accomplishments and honors

Championships
- 2 NCAC (2018–2019)

Awards
- NCAC Coach of the Year (2016)

Jack Hatem (born c. 1961) is an American college football coach. He is the head football coach for Denison University, a position he has held since 2010. He was the head football coach for William V. Fisher Catholic High School from 1992 to 1994, Highland High School from 1995 to 1997, and New Albany High School from 1998 to 2004. He was the head baseball coach for the University of Rio Grande from 1983 to 1985 and Bishop Watterson High School from 1986 to 1991.

== Head coaching record ==
=== College football ===
| Year | Team | Overall | Conference | Standing | Bowl/playoffs |
|---|---|---|---|---|---|
Denison Big Red (North Coast Athletic Conference) (2010–present)
| 2010 | Denison | 4–6 | 2–4 | T–6th | |
| 2011 | Denison | 5–5 | 4–2 | 3rd | |
| 2012 | Denison | 4–6 | 4–3 | T–5th | |
| 2013 | Denison | 7–3 | 6–3 | 4th | |
| 2014 | Denison | 6–4 | 5–4 | T–4th | |
| 2015 | Denison | 7–3 | 6–3 | 4th | |
| 2016 | Denison | 8–2 | 7–2 | T–2nd | |
| 2017 | Denison | 7–3 | 6–3 | 4th | |
| 2018 | Denison | 8–3 | 8–1 | T–1st | L NCAA Division III First Round |
| 2019 | Denison | 8–2 | 7–2 | T–1st | |
| 2020–21 | Denison | 1–0 | 0–0 | N/A | |
| 2021 | Denison | 6–4 | 6–3 | T–4th | |
| 2022 | Denison | 8–2 | 6–2 | T–2nd | |
| 2023 | Denison | 7–3 | 6–2 | T–2nd | |
| 2024 | Denison | 6–4 | 6–2 | 3rd | |
| 2025 | Denison | 6–4 | 5–3 | 4th | |
| 2026 | Denison | 0–0 | 0–0 | | |
| Denison: | | 98–54 | 84–39 | | |
| Total: | | 98–54 | | | |
National championship Conference title Conference division title or championship game berth
