= La Plume, Pennsylvania =

Unincorporated community in Pennsylvania, US

- Unincorporated community
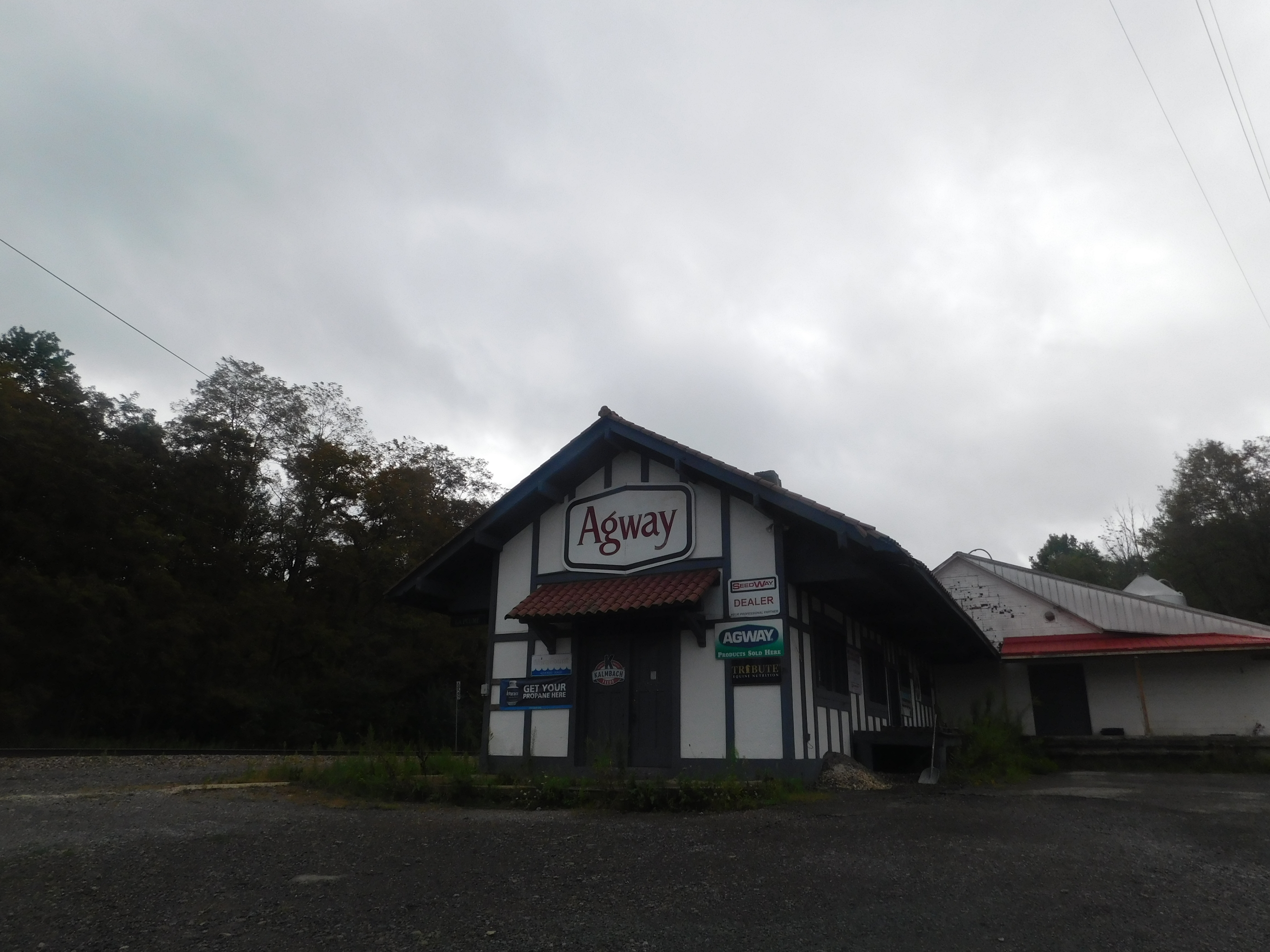
- The former Delaware, Lackawanna and Western Railroad station in La Plume, serving as an Agway.

- Location within Pennsylvania Location within the United States
- Coordinates: 41°33′24″N 75°45′14″W
- Country: United States
- State: Pennsylvania
- County: Lackawanna
- Township: La Plume
- Elevation: 896 ft (273 m)
- Time zone: UTC-5 (Eastern (EST))
  - Summer (DST): UTC-4 (EDT)
- ZIP code: 18440
- Area codes: 272 & 570
- GNIS feature ID: 1178738

La Plume is an unincorporated community in Lackawanna County, Pennsylvania, United States. The community is located at the intersection of U.S. Route 6 and Pennsylvania Route 438, 1.5 miles (2.4 km) east-southeast of Factoryville. La Plume has a post office with ZIP code 18440. La Plume is located 11 miles northwest of Scranton, one of Pennsylvania's most populous cities.
