= Ray DeFrisco =

American football coach

Current position
- Title: Head coach
- Team: Illinois College
- Conference: MWC
- Record: 56–35

Playing career
- 1998–2001: North Park
- Position: Defensive lineman

Coaching career (HC unless noted)
- 2002–2005: St. Patrick HS (IL) (DC)
- 2006–2007: Illinois College (ST/DL)
- 2008–2015: Illinois College (DC)
- 2016–present: Illinois College

Head coaching record
- Overall: 56–35
- Bowls: 0–1
- Tournaments: 0–1 (NCAA D-III playoffs)

Accomplishments and honors

Championships
- 1 MWC (2023)

Awards
- MWC Coach of the Year (2023)

Ray DeFrisco is an American college football coach. He is the head football coach for Illinois College, a position he has held since 2016. DeFrisco had previously served as the Blueboys defensive coordinator under Garrett Campbell from 2008 to 2015, and as the defensive line coach and special teams coordinator from 2006 to 2007.

== Head coaching record ==
Year	Team	Overall	Conference	Standing	Bowl/playoffs
Illinois College Blueboys (Midwest Conference) (2016–present)
2016	Illinois College	6–4	5–3	5th	
2017	Illinois College	5–5	3–2	3rd (South)	
2018	Illinois College	4–6	2–3	T–3rd (South)	
2019	Illinois College	6–3	2–2	3rd (South)	
2020–21	Illinois College	0–1			
2021	Illinois College	5–5	5–4	5th	
2022	Illinois College	5–4	4–4	5th	
2023	Illinois College	9–2	8–1	T–1st	L NCAA Division III First Round
2024	Illinois College	8–2	7–2	3rd	
2025	Illinois College	8–3	7–2	T–2nd	L Lakefront
2026	Illinois College	0–0	0–0		
Illinois College:		56–35	43–23		
Total:		56–35			
National championship Conference title Conference division title or championship game berth
