= Scott Linn =

American football coach (born c. 1983)

Current position
- Title: Head coach
- Team: Alfred State
- Conference: Empire 8
- Record: 31–41

Biographical details
- Born: c. 1983 (age 42–43)
- Education: Albion College (2006); Alfred University (2009)

Playing career
- 2002–2005: Albion
- Position: Fullback

Coaching career (HC unless noted)
- 2006: Albion (FB/TE)
- 2007–2008: Alfred (RB)
- 2009–2010: Hartwick (DL)
- 2011: Hartwick (LB)
- 2012–2013: Hartwick (ST/DB)
- 2014–2017: Alfred (OC)
- 2018–present: Alfred State

Head coaching record
- Overall: 31–41
- Bowls: 0–1
- Tournaments: 0–2 (NCAA D-III playoffs)

Accomplishments and honors

Championships
- 3 ECFC (2021, 2023–2024)

Awards
- ECFC Coach of the Year (2024)

Scott Linn (born c. 1983) is an American college football coach. He is the head football coach for Alfred State College, a position he has held since 2018. He also coached for Albion, Alfred, and Hartwick. He played college football for Albion as a fullback.

== Head coaching record ==
Year	Team	Overall	Conference	Standing	Bowl/playoffs
Alfred State Pioneers (Eastern Collegiate Football Conference) (2018–2024)
2018	Alfred State	1–9	1–5	T–5th	
2019	Alfred State	3–6	2–3	T–3rd	
2020–21	No team—COVID-19				
2021	Alfred State	6–5	5–1	T–1st	L New England
2022	Alfred State	5–5	3–3	T–3rd	
2023	Alfred State	6–5	3–1	T–1st	L NCAA Division III First Round
2024	Alfred State	5–6	2–1	T–1st	L NCAA Division III First Round
Alfred State Pioneers (Empire 8) (2025–present)
2025	Alfred State	5–5	3–4	5th	
2026	Alfred State	0–0	0–0		
Alfred State:		31–41	19–18		
Total:		31–41			
National championship Conference title Conference division title or championship game berth
