= Tyler Hopperton =

American football coach (born 1989)

Current position
- Title: Head coach
- Team: Mount St. Joseph
- Conference: HCAC
- Record: 73–28

Biographical details
- Born: August 3, 1989 (age 37); Walton, Kentucky, U.S.

Playing career
- 2008–2011: Mount St. Joseph
- Position: Linebacker

Coaching career (HC unless noted)
- 2012–2014: Mount St. Joseph (ST/LB)
- 2015–2016: Mount St. Joseph (AHC/ST)
- 2017–present: Mount St. Joseph

Head coaching record
- Overall: 73–28
- Bowls: 0–2
- Tournaments: 0–3 (NCAA D-III playoffs)

Accomplishments and honors

Championships
- 4 HCAC (2018, 2022–2024)

Awards
- 2× HCAC Coach of the Year (2022–2023)

Tyler Hopperton (born August 3, 1989) is an American college football coach. He is the head football coach for Mount St. Joseph University, a position he has held since 2017. Hopperton was a standout linebacker at Mount St. Joseph from 2008 to 2011, before going into coaching at his alma mater, where he started off as the linebackers coach and special teams coordinator. Hopperton eventually became an assistant head coach in 2015, a position he held for two seasons until the retirement of head coach Rod Huber during the 2017 offseason. Hopperton was at first named the interim head coach for the 2017 season, but was eventually named the full-time head coach during the season. Since his hiring in 2017, Hopperton has led the Lions to four HCAC titles, and three NCAA Division III playoff appearances.

== Head coaching record ==
Year	Team	Overall	Conference	Standing	Bowl/playoffs
Mount St. Joseph Lions (Heartland Collegiate Athletic Conference) (2017–present)
2017	Mount St. Joseph	6–4	5–3	T–3rd	
2018	Mount St. Joseph	8–2	7–1	T–1st	
2019	Mount St. Joseph	7–3	5–2	2nd	
2020–21	Mount St. Joseph	5–1	5–1	2nd	
2021	Mount St. Joseph	6–4	5–2	2nd	
2022	Mount St. Joseph	10–1	7–0	1st	L NCAA Division III First Round
2023	Mount St. Joseph	9–2	7–0	1st	L NCAA Division III First Round
2024	Mount St. Joseph	8–3	6–0	1st	L NCAA Division III First Round
2025	Mount St. Joseph	6–5	5–1	2nd	L Extra Points
2026	Mount St. Joseph	8–3	5–1	T–1st	L ForeverLawn
Mount St. Joseph:		73–28	57–11		
Total:		65–25			
National championship Conference title Conference division title or championship game berth
