= Alfred State Pioneers football =

Intercollegiate football team representing Alfred State College

2024 Alfred State Pioneers football team
- First season: 1995; 31 years ago
- Head coach: Scott Linn; 7th season, 31–41 (.431)
- Location: Alfred, New York
- Stadium: Pioneer Stadium (capacity: 1,500)
- Conference: Empire 8
- Colors: Blue and gold
- All-time record: 110–175 (.386)
- Bowl record: 0–1 (.000)

Conference championships
- 3
- Website: alfredstateathletics.com

The Alfred State Pioneers football team is a college football that competes as part of National Collegiate Athletic Association (NCAA) Division III, representing Alfred State College in the Empire 8.

== Championships ==
=== Conference championships ===
Alfred State claims three conference titles, the most recent of which came in 2024.

Year	Conference	Overall Record	Conference Record	Coach
2021†	Eastern Collegiate Football Conference	6–5	5–1	Scott Linn
2023†	Eastern Collegiate Football Conference	6–5	3–1	Scott Linn
2024	Eastern Collegiate Football Conference	5–6	2–1	Scott Linn

† Co-champions

== Postseason games ==
=== NCAA Division III playoff games ===
The Pioneers have made two appearances in the NCAA Division III playoffs, with a combined record of 0–2.

Year	Round	Opponent	Result
2023	First Round	Mount Union	L, 14–56
2024	First Round	Endicott	L, 0–44

=== Bowl games ===
The Pioneers have participated in one bowl game, with a record of 0–1.

Season	Coach	Bowl	Opponent	Result
2021	Scott Linn	New England Bowl	UMass Dartmouth	L 16–42

== List of head coaches ==
=== Key ===
Key to symbols in coaches list
General		Overall		Conference		Postseason (Note: Although the first Rose Bowl Game was played in 1902, it has been continuously played since the 1916 game, and is recognized as the oldest bowl game by the NCAA. "—" indicates any season prior to 1916 when postseason games were not played.)	
No.	Order of coaches (Note: A running total of the number of head coaches, with coaches who served separate tenures being counted only once. Interim head coaches are represented with "Int" and are not counted in the running total. "—" indicates the team played but either without a coach or no coach is on record. "X" indicates an interim year without play.)	GC	Games coached	CW	Conference wins	PW	Postseason wins
DC	Division championships	OW	Overall wins	CL	Conference losses	PL	Postseason losses
CC	Conference championships	OL	Overall losses	CT	Conference ties	PT	Postseason ties
NC	National championships	OT	Overall ties (Note: Overtime rules in college football were introduced in 1996, making ties impossible in the period since.)	C%	Conference winning percentage		
†	Elected to the College Football Hall of Fame	O%	Overall winning percentage (Note: When computing the win–loss percentage, a tie counts as half a win and half a loss.)				

=== Coaches ===
List of head football coaches showing season(s) coached, overall records and conference records
No.	Name	Season(s)	GC	OW	OL	O%	CW	CL	C%
1	Mark Shardlow	1995–1999	47	20	27	0.426	—	—	—
2	Mick Caba	2000–2014	157	66	91	0.420	—	—	—
3	Jarod Dodson	2015–2017	30	3	27	0.100	1	6	0.143
4	Scott Linn	2018–present	72	31	41	0.431	19	18	0.514
