= Justin Higgins =

American football coach (born c. 1977)

Current position
- Title: Defensive coordinator & linebackers coach
- Team: Hobart
- Conference: Liberty

Biographical details
- Born: c. 1977 (age 48–49); Warrensburg, New York, U.S.
- Education: Ithaca College (2000); Kean University (2003)

Playing career

Football
- 1996–1999: Ithaca

Baseball
- 1996–1999: Ithaca

Coaching career (HC unless noted)

Football
- 1999: Ithaca (def. assistant)
- 2000–2002: Kean (GA)
- 2003: Lehigh (assistant DB)
- 2004: Morrisville (DL)
- 2005: Richfield Springs Central HS (NY)
- 2006–2007: Morrisville (DC/LB)
- 2008–2009: Utica (assistant)
- 2010–2016: Morrisville (DC/STC)
- 2017: Seton Hill (STC/DB)
- 2018–2024: Keystone
- 2025: RPI (STC)
- 2026–present: Hobart (DC/LB)

Head coaching record
- Overall: 6–34 (college); 3–4 (club); 3–6 (high school)

Justin Higgins (born c. 1977) is an American college football coach. He is the defensive coordinator and linebackers coach for Hobart and William Smith Colleges, positions he has held since 2026. He was the head football coach for Keystone College from 2018 to 2024. Higgins was head football coach at Richfield Springs Central High School, in Richfield Springs, New York from 2005 to 2006. he also coached for Ithaca, Kean, Lehigh, Morrisville State, Utica, and Seton Hill. He played college football for Ithaca.

== Head coaching record ==
=== College ===
Year	Team	Overall	Conference	Standing	Bowl/playoffs
Keystone Giants (Eastern Collegiate Football Conference) (2021–2022)
2021	Keystone	0–10	0–6	7th	
2022	Keystone	3–7	3–3	5th	
Keystone Giants (Landmark Conference) (2023–2024)
2023	Keystone	2–8	1–5	6th	
2024	Keystone	1–9	0–6	7th	
Keystone:		6–34	4–20		
Total:		6–34			

=== Club ===
Year	Team	Overall	Conference	Standing	Bowl/playoffs
Keystone Giants (Club) (2019)
2019	Keystone	3–4			
Keystone:		3–4			
Total:		3–4			

=== High school ===
Year	Team	Overall	Conference	Standing	Bowl/playoffs
Richfield Springs Central Indians () (2005)
2005	Richfield Springs Central	3–6	2–3	4th	
Richfield Springs Central:		3–6	2–3		
Total:		3–6			
