= Jason Lebeau =

American football coach (born 1988)

Jason LeBeau
Current position
- Title: Head coach
- Team: Western New England
- Conference: CNE
- Record: 48–26

Biographical details
- Born: July 18, 1988 (age 38)
- Education: Western New England University (2010, 2016)

Playing career
- 2006–2009: Western New England
- Position: Offensive lineman

Coaching career (HC unless noted)
- 2010: Western New England (OL)
- 2011: Western New England (TE)
- 2012–2017: Western New England (OC)
- 2018–present: Western New England

Head coaching record
- Overall: 48–26
- Bowls: 1–1
- Tournaments: 0–2 (NCAA D-III playoffs)

Accomplishments and honors

Championships
- 2 CC Football (2018–2019)

Jason LeBeau (born July 18, 1988) is an American college football coach. He is the head football coach for Western New England, a position he has held since 2018. He played college football for Western New England as an offensive lineman.

== Head coaching record ==
Year	Team	Overall	Conference	Standing	Bowl/playoffs	D3^{#}	AFCA^{°}
Western New England Golden Bears (Commonwealth Coast Football) (2018–2021)
2018	Western New England	8–3	5–1	1st	L NCAA Division III First Round		
2019	Western New England	9–2	7–0	1st	L NCAA Division III First Round		
2020–21	No team—COVID-19						
2021	Western New England	7–4	5–1	2nd	L New England		
Western New England Golden Bears (Commonwealth Coast Conference / Conference of New England) (2022–present)
2022	Western New England	4–6	3–3	4th			
2023	Western New England	8–3	4–1	2nd	W New England		
2024	Western New England	6–4	3–2	2nd			
2025	Western New England	6–4	4–3	4th			
2026	Western New England	0–0	0–0				
Western New England:		48–26	31–11				
Total:		48–26					
National championship Conference title Conference division title or championship game berth
