= Ralph Isernia =

American football coach (born c. 1968)

Current position
- Title: Head coach
- Team: RPI
- Conference: Liberty
- Record: 98–46

Biographical details
- Born: c. 1969 (age 56–57); Long Island, New York, U.S.
- Education: Davidson College (1991); Western Connecticut State University (1994)

Playing career

Football
- 1987–1990: Davidson

Baseball
- 1987–1990: Davidson
- Position: Running back (football)

Coaching career (HC unless noted)

Football
- 1991–1993: Western Connecticut (RB)
- 1994–1999: Methodist (OC)
- 2000: Defiance (AHC/OC)
- 2001–2003: Mansfield (AHC/OC)
- 2004: Bucknell (TE/OL)
- 2005–2010: Charleston (WV) (AHC/OC)
- 2011–2012: Ferrum (AHC/OC)
- 2013–present: RPI

Head coaching record
- Overall: 98–46
- Bowls: 5–2
- Tournaments: 4–4 (NCAA D-III playoffs)

Ralph Isernia (born c. 1969) is an American college football coach. He is the head football coach for Rensselaer Polytechnic Institute, a position he has held since 2013. He coached for Western Connecticut, Methodist, Defiance, Mansfield, Bucknell, Charleston (WV), and Ferrum. He played college football and college baseball for Davidson.

== Head coaching record ==
Year	Team	Overall	Conference	Standing	Bowl/playoffs	D3^{#}
RPI Engineers (Liberty League) (2013–present)
2013	RPI	5–5	2–5	T–6th		
2014	RPI	6–5	4–3	3rd	L North Atlantic	
2015	RPI	9–2	6–1	T–1st	W Asa S. Bushnell	
2016	RPI	6–5	3–4	T–5th	W Robert M. "Scotty" Whitelaw	
2017	RPI	8–3	4–1	T–1st	L NCAA Division III First Round	
2018	RPI	10–2	4–1	T–1st	L NCAA Division III Quarterfinal	11
2019	RPI	6–5	3–3	T–4th	L James Lynah	
2020–21	No team—COVID-19					
2021	RPI	11–2	5–1	T–1st	L NCAA Division III Quarterfinal	14
2022	RPI	8–3	5–1	2nd	W Robert M. "Scotty" Whitelaw	
2023	RPI	8–3	3–3	4th	W Robert M. "Scotty" Whitelaw	
2024	RPI	5–5	3–3	3rd		
2025	RPI	8–3	5–2	3rd	W Clayton Chapman	
2026	RPI	8–3	7–0	1st	L NCAA Division III First Round	
RPI:		98–46	54–28			
Total:		98–46				
National championship Conference title Conference division title or championship game berth
