= Mike Clark (athletic director) =

American football coach and college athletic administrator

Current position
- Title: Athletic director & head coach
- Team: Lycoming
- Conference: Landmark
- Record: 94–81

Playing career
- 1989–1992: Lycoming
- Position: Offensive lineman

Coaching career (HC unless noted)
- 1994–1995: Rowan (GA)
- 1996–1997: Princeton (TE/RB)
- 1998–1999: Lycoming (OL)
- 2000–2007: Davidson (OC)
- 2008–present: Lycoming

Administrative career (AD unless noted)
- 2012–present: Lycoming

Head coaching record
- Overall: 94–81
- Bowls: 1–1
- Tournaments: 0–1 (NCAA D-III playoffs)

Accomplishments and honors

Championships
- 2 Middle Atlantic (2008, 2013)

Mike Clark is an American college football coach and athletic director. He is the head football coach and athletic director for Lycoming College, holding the position of head football coach since 2008 and athletic director since 2012.

== Head coaching record ==
Year	Team	Overall	Conference	Standing	Bowl/playoffs
Lycoming Warriors (Middle Atlantic Conference) (2008–2022)
2008	Lycoming	7–4	5–2	T–1st	L NCAA Division III First Round
2009	Lycoming	4–6	3–4	T–4th	
2010	Lycoming	6–4	4–3	T–4th	
2011	Lycoming	8–2	6–2	T–2nd	
2012	Lycoming	8–2	8–1	2nd	
2013	Lycoming	7–3	7–2	T–1st	
2014	Lycoming	8–2	7–2	3rd	
2015	Lycoming	4–6	4–5	6th	
2016	Lycoming	3–7	2–7	T–8th	
2017	Lycoming	4–6	4–5	T–6th	
2018	Lycoming	5–6	4–4	T–4th	
2019	Lycoming	4–6	3–5	T–6th	
2020–21	Lycoming	1–0	0–0	N/A	
2021	Lycoming	8–3	6–2	2nd	W Centennial-MAC Bowl
2022	Lycoming	4–6	3–5	7th	
Lycoming Warriors (Landmark Conference) (2023–present)
2023	Lycoming	4–6	4–2	T–2nd	
2024	Lycoming	4–6	2–4	5th	
2025	Lycoming	5–6	5–1	2nd	L Cape Charles Bowl
2026	Lycoming	0–0	0–0		
Lycoming:		94–81	77–56		
Total:		94–81			
National championship Conference title Conference division title or championship game berth
