= Kyle Sweeney (American football) =

American football player and coach

Current position
- Title: Head coach
- Team: Claremont-Mudd-Scripps
- Conference: SCIAC
- Record: 77–56

Playing career
- 1996–1999: Occidental
- Position: Strong safety

Coaching career (HC unless noted)
- 2000: Illinois Wesleyan (assistant)
- 2001: Occidental (recruiting assistant)
- 2002–2006: Endicott (DC)
- 2007–2008: MacMurray
- 2009–2010: Chicago (DC)
- 2011–present: Claremont-Mudd-Scripps

Head coaching record
- Overall: 81–72
- Tournaments: 0–1 (NCAA D-III playoffs)

Accomplishments and honors

Championships
- 2 SCIAC (2018, 2022); 1 SCIAC Surf Division (2023)

Kyle B. Sweeney is an American college football coach and former player. He is the head football coach for Claremont-Mudd-Scripps (the joint intercollegiate sports program of Claremont McKenna College, Harvey Mudd College, and Scripps College), a position he has held since 2011. From 2007 to 2008, Sweeney was the head coach at MacMurray College in Jacksonville, Illinois. Prior to arriving at Claremont, he was the defensive coordinator at the University of Chicago from 2009 to 2010.

== Head coaching record ==
=== College ===
Year	Team	Overall	Conference	Standing	Bowl/playoffs
MacMurray Highlanders (Illini-Badger Football Conference) (2007)
2007	MacMurray	0–10	0–7		
MacMurray Highlanders (Northern Athletics Conference) (2008)
2008	MacMurray	4–6	4–6		
MacMurray:		4–16	4–13		
Claremont-Mudd-Scripps Stags (Southern California Intercollegiate Athletic Conference) (2011–present)
2011	Claremont-Mudd-Scripps	4–5	0–0	T–3rd	
2012	Claremont-Mudd-Scripps	0–9	0–7	8th	
2013	Claremont-Mudd-Scripps	3–6	2–5	T–5th	
2014	Claremont-Mudd-Scripps	5–4	4–3	T–3rd	
2015	Claremont-Mudd-Scripps	7–2	6–1	2nd	
2016	Claremont-Mudd-Scripps	7–2	5–2	T–2nd	
2017	Claremont-Mudd-Scripps	4–5	2–4	T–5th	
2018	Claremont-Mudd-Scripps	7–4	6–1	T–1st	L NCAA Division III First Round
2019	Claremont-Mudd-Scripps	5–5	3–4	T–5th	
2020–21	No team—COVID-19				
2021	Claremont-Mudd-Scripps	7–3	4–2	T–2nd	
2022	Claremont-Mudd-Scripps	7–2	5–1	T–1st	
2023	Claremont-Mudd-Scripps	8–2	6–2	T–1st (Surf)	
2024	Claremont-Mudd-Scripps	8–2	6–2	2nd (Surf)	
2025	Claremont-Mudd-Scripps	5–5	3–5	3rd (Sun)	
2026	Claremont-Mudd-Scripps	0–0	0–0	(Sun)	
Claremont-Mudd-Scripps:		77–56	52–39		
Total:		81–72			
National championship Conference title Conference division title or championship game berth
