= Peter Haugen =

American football coach (born c. 1969)

Current position
- Title: Head coach
- Team: Gustavus Adolphus
- Conference: MIAC
- Record: 91–76

Biographical details
- Born: c. 1969 (age 56–57); Minneapolis, Minnesota, U.S.
- Education: Bethel University (1991)

Playing career

Football
- 1988–1991: Bethel (MN)

Men's ice hockey
- 1988–1991: Bethel (MN)

Baseball
- 1988–1991: Bethel (MN)
- Positions: Tight end (football); Goaltender (men's ice hockey); Catcher (baseball)

Coaching career (HC unless noted)

Football
- 1992–1993: Washburn HS (MN) (OL)
- 1994–2008: Washburn HS (MN)
- 2009–present: Gustavus Adolphus

Head coaching record
- Overall: 91–76 (college); 111–44 (high school)

Accomplishments and honors

Championships
- 1 MIAC Northwoods Division (2023)

Peter Haugen (born c. 1969) is an American college football coach. He is the head football coach for Gustavus Adolphus College, a position he has held since 2009. He was the head football coach for Washburn High School from 1994 to 2008. He was a three-sport athlete in American football, men's ice hockey, and baseball at Bethel University in Saint Paul, Minnesota.

== Head coaching record ==
=== College ===
Year	Team	Overall	Conference	Standing	Bowl/playoffs
Gustavus Adolphus Golden Gusties (Minnesota Intercollegiate Athletic Conference) (2009–present)
2009	Gustavus Adolphus	4–6	3–5	T–4th	
2010	Gustavus Adolphus	4–6	3–5	6th	
2011	Gustavus Adolphus	2–8	2–6	7th	
2012	Gustavus Adolphus	3–7	2–6	7th	
2013	Gustavus Adolphus	6–4	4–4	5th	
2014	Gustavus Adolphus	6–4	4–4	5th	
2015	Gustavus Adolphus	7–3	5–3	T–3rd	
2016	Gustavus Adolphus	5–5	3–5	T–5th	
2017	Gustavus Adolphus	5–5	4–4	5th	
2018	Gustavus Adolphus	6–4	5–3	4th	
2019	Gustavus Adolphus	7–3	5–3	T–4th	
2020–21	No team—COVID-19				
2021	Gustavus Adolphus	8–2	6–2	2nd (Northwoods)	
2022	Gustavus Adolphus	7–3	6–2	2nd (Northwoods)	
2023	Gustavus Adolphus	6–4	5–3	1st (Northwoods)	
2024	Gustavus Adolphus	5–5	4–4	T–2nd (Northwoods)	
2025	Gustavus Adolphus	5–5	5–4	5th	
2026	Gustavus Adolphus	5–2	4–2		
Gustavus Adolphus:		91–76	70–65		
Total:		91–76			
National championship Conference title Conference division title or championship game berth
