= Melissa Di Donato =

American-born businesswoman

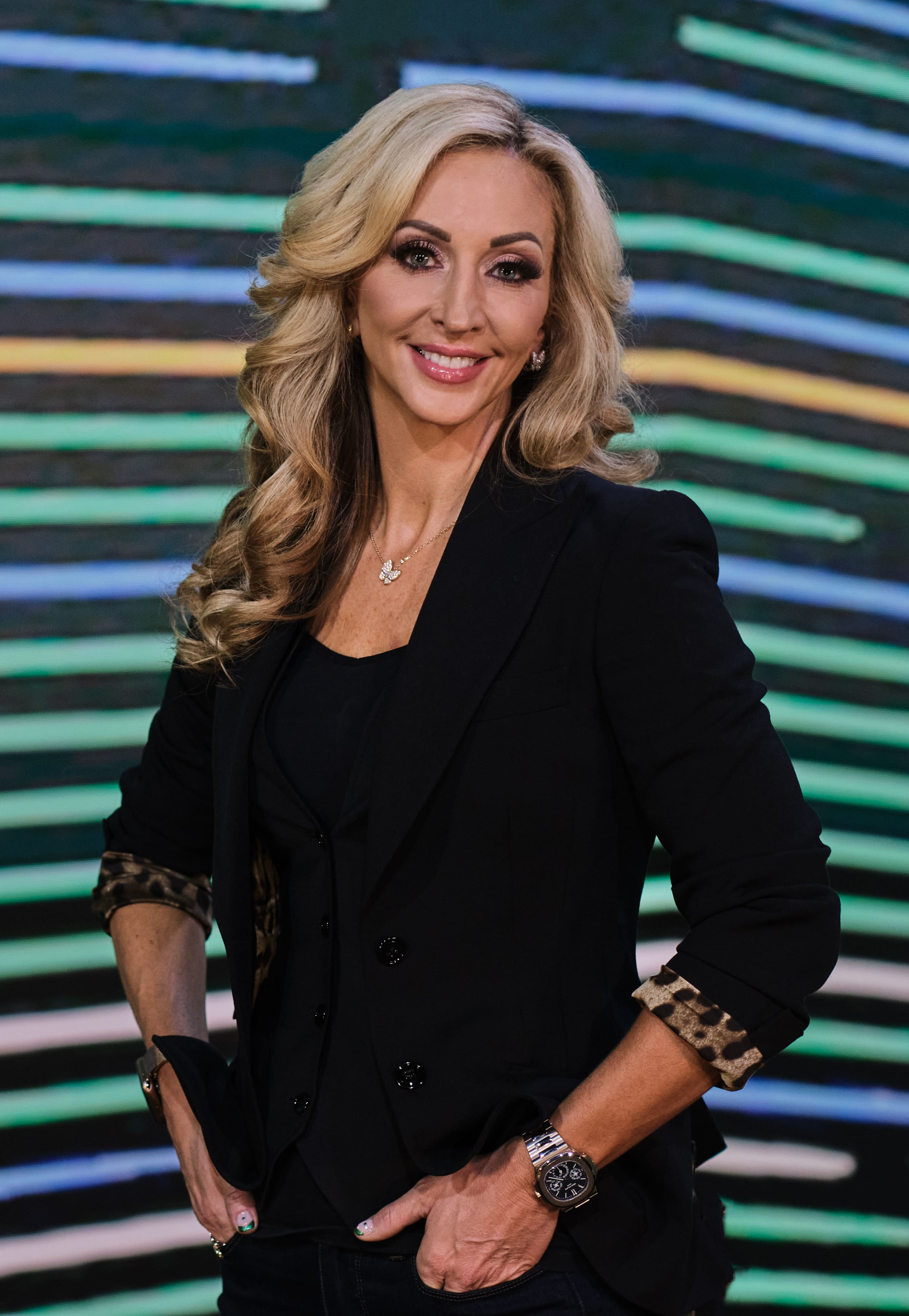
- Occupations: Business executive, software developer
- Known for: Chair & CEO of Kyriba

Melissa Di Donato is an American-born businesswoman based in the United Kingdom, currently serving as Chair and CEO of Kyriba.

== Career ==
Di Donato began her career as a technologist and SAP R/3 developer, becoming one of the few female software developers working on the platform at that time. Between 1998 and 2008 she held roles at PricewaterhouseCoopers (PwC), Oracle and IBM. After holding senior positions at Salesforce, she subsequently became Chief Revenue Officer and Chief Operating Officer of SAP for its digital core (ERP) division.

In July 2019, Melissa Di Donato was appointed CEO of SUSE, becoming the first woman to lead the company. Under her leadership, SUSE completed its initial public offering on the Frankfurt Stock Exchange in May 2021, becoming one of Europe’s largest publicly traded open-source software companies. In March 2023, SUSE announced that Di Donato would be stepping down from her role as CEO. Reuters reported that emails indicated she had bypassed internal checks on a discounted $1.4 million sale although her lawyers responded that this was "highly misleading".

Di Donato is a member of the supervisory board of Porsche AG, appointed in 2022 in connection with Porsche's initial public offering. She is also a non-executive director at J.P. Morgan Europe. In April 2023, she was appointed a non-executive director of the newly created Department for Science, Innovation and Technology (DSIT). She also serves on the SME Digital Adoption Taskforce at the Department for Business and Trade.
