= Andrew DiDonato =

American football coach (born c. 1987)

Current position
- Title: Head coach
- Team: Grove City
- Conference: PAC
- Record: 67–35

Biographical details
- Born: c. 1987 (age 38–39); Bridgeville, Pennsylvania, U.S.
- Education: Grove City College (2010); PennWest California (2011)

Playing career

Football
- 2006–2009: Grove City

Men's basketball
- 2006–2009: Grove City
- Position: Quarterback (football)

Coaching career (HC unless noted)

Football
- 2010–2011: Buffalo (GA)
- 2012: Peters Township HS (PA) (assistant)
- 2013–2014: South Fayette HS (PA) (OC)
- 2015: Grove City (OC)
- 2016–present: Grove City

Head coaching record
- Overall: 67–35
- Bowls: 4–0
- Tournaments: 1–3 (NCAA D-III playoffs)

Accomplishments and honors

Championships
- 2 PAC (2023–2024)

Awards
- 2× PAC Coach of the Year (2018, 2023)

Andrew DiDonato (born c. 1987) is an American college football coach. He is the head football coach for Grove City College, a position he has held since 2016. He also coached for Buffalo, Peters Township High School, and South Fayette High School. He was a two-sport athlete for Grove City, playing both football as a quarterback and men's basketball.

== Head coaching record ==
Year	Team	Overall	Conference	Standing	Bowl/playoffs	D3^{#}	AFCA^{°}
Grove City Wolverines (Presidents' Athletic Conference) (2016–present)
2016	Grove City	0–10	0–8	11th			
2017	Grove City	4–6	4–4	6th			
2018	Grove City	8–3	6–3	4th	W James Lynah		
2019	Grove City	9–2	7–2	T–2nd	W James Lynah		
2020–21	Grove City	2–2	2–2	T–3rd			
2021	Grove City	8–3	6–3	4th	W Robert M. "Scotty" Whitelaw		
2022	Grove City	8–3	5–3	T–4th	W James Lynah		
2023	Grove City	11–1	10–0	1st	L NCAA Division III Second Round	10	10
2024	Grove City	9–2	9–1	T–1st	L NCAA Division III Second Round	12	17
2025	Grove City	8–3	7–1	2nd	L NCAA Division III First Round		
2026	Grove City	0–0	0–0				
Grove City:		67–35	56–27				
Total:		67–35					
National championship Conference title Conference division title or championship game berth
