= Anna Maria Amcats football, 2009–2019 =

American college football seasons

2009–2019 Anna Maria Amcats football
- Conference: ECFC (2009–2024)
- Head coach: Marc Klaiman (2009–2011); Vince Sinagra (2012–2016); Dan Mulrooney (2017–2021)
- Home stadium: AMCAT Field (2009–2018); Caparso Field (2019)

The Anna Maria Amcats football (often stylized as AmCats, AMCATS, or AMcats) teams represented Anna Maria College in American football during the program's first decade of college football from 2009 to 2019. The team competed as a member of the Eastern Collegiate Football Conference (ECFC) from 2009 to 2024. Highlights include the following:

- In 2011, Anna Maria won their first game against Becker, 35–33.

Anna Maria played their home games at AMCAT Field from 2009 to 2018 and at the newly renovated Caparso Field starting in 2019.

The head coaches were Marc Klaiman (2–27) from 2009 to 2011, Vince Sinagra (6–44) from 2012 to 2016, and Dan Mulrooney (11–29) from 2017 to 2021.

== 2009 ==
2009 Anna Maria Amcats football
- Conference: Eastern Collegiate Football Conference
- Record: 0–9 (0–0 ECFC)
- Head coach: Marc Klaiman (1st season)
- Offensive coordinator: Bob Frey (1st season)
- Captain: Matt Cantwell
- Home stadium: AMCAT Field

2009 Eastern Collegiate Football Conference standings
	Conf.			Overall
Team	W		L	W		L
Norwich y$	6	–	0	8	–	3
Gallaudet	4	–	2	6	–	4
Mount Ida y	4	–	2	4	–	7
Maritime	3	–	3	6	–	4
Husson	3	–	3	4	–	5
Castleton	1	–	5	3	–	6
Becker	0	–	6	0	–	10
Anna Maria*	0	–	0	0	–	9
Championship: Norwich 49, Mount Ida 14
$ – Conference champion; y – Championship game participant; * – Anna Maria was accepted as a member of ECFC, but was not eligible for conference standings until 2010.

The 2009 Anna Maria Amcats football team represented Anna Maria College of Paxton, Massachusetts. In its first year under head coach Marc Klaiman, Anna Maria compiled an overall record of 0–9. Although Anna Maria was accepted into the Eastern Collegiate Football Conference (ECFC), their games did not officially count as conference games during the 2009 season.

Anna Maria's president, Jack P. Calareso—who previously established the football programs for Briar Cliff University and Ohio Dominican University—led the push towards beginning a football program In 2008, Marc Klaiman, Merrimack's associate head coach and defensive coordinator was hired as the program's inaugural head coach. Additionally, the Amcats hired former MacMurray and Tri-State head coach Bob Frey as assistant head coach and offensive coordinator.

The Amcats debuted on the newly built AMCAT Field in their inaugural season—a $2 million facility that instantly elevated the program. Half of the budget went toward installing FieldTurf, the same surface used at Gillette Stadium, while the remaining funds covered infrastructure upgrades, including bleachers, lighting, and a solar-powered scoreboard.

Although Anna Maria was accepted into the Eastern Collegiate Football Conference (ECFC), it did not become a full member until the following season. Nonetheless, Anna Maria still played a schedule mostly of ECFC teams. After the season, despite not officially being a member of the ECFC, kicker Jamal Mitchell earned First-team All-ECFC honors, while wide receiver Domenique Concepcion and linebacker Rich Brandt were named to the Second-team All-ECFC.

=== Schedule ===
Date	Time	Opponent	Site	Result	Attendance	Source
September 5	1:00 p.m.	at Castleton	Castleton, VT; Spartan Stadium	L 28–42	4,030–5,200	
September 12	1:00 p.m.	Fitchburg State	Paxton, MA; AMCAT Field	L 12–48	1,783	
September 19	1:00 p.m.	at Husson	Bangor, ME; Winkin Sports Complex	L 12–63	1,000	
September 26	1:00 p.m.	Malone	Paxton, MA; AMCAT Field	L 10–65	510	
October 3	4:00 p.m.	at Maritime	Throggs Neck, NY; Reinhart Field	L 21–61	550	
October 10	1:00 p.m.	Utica	Paxton, MA; AMCAT Field	L 7–43	289	
October 17	1:00 p.m.	Castleton^{†}	Paxton, MA; AMCAT Field	L 21–24	800	
October 24	1:30 p.m.	at Norwich	Northfield, VT; Sabine Field	L 0–48	356	
October 31	12:00 p.m.	Gallaudet	Paxton, MA; AMCAT Field	L 7–56	513	
^{†}Homecoming

=== Game summaries ===
==== Castleton ====
Week 1: Anna Maria at Castleton

Team	1	2	3	4	Total
Anna Maria	0	14	0	14	28
• Castleton	21	7	0	14	42

- Date: September 5
- Location: Spartan Stadium
  Castleton, VT
- Game attendance: 4,030–5,200
- Game weather: Temperature: 70 °F (21 °C) • Weather: Sunny, warm

The Anna Maria Amcats football team faced a tough defeat in their first-ever game against Castleton, led by Rich Alercio, losing 42–28 in the Spartans' historic inaugural matchup at Spartan Stadium.

Castleton made an immediate impact with freshman Evan Cassidy returning the opening kickoff 70 yards, setting up the first touchdown of the game. The Spartans quickly built a commanding 21–0 lead in the first quarter, with running back Tyler Carpenter powering through for two touchdowns, including a 5-yard run and an 8-yard score. Quarterback Shane Brozowski also contributed to the offense, completing 13 of 17 passes for 202 yards and two touchdowns, one of which went to Tom Cole, who racked up 115 receiving yards.

The Amcats weren't deterred by the early deficit. In the second quarter, quarterback Santino Simone sneaked in for a 1-yard touchdown run, and wide receiver Domenique Concepcion caught a 27-yard touchdown pass, cutting the Spartans' lead to 28–14 heading into halftime.

In the second half, Anna Maria continued to battle, with Nii Quartey recovering a fumble from Castleton's backup quarterback and returning it 35 yards for a touchdown, bringing the score to 35-21. However, Castleton responded quickly, as Cassidy returned the ensuing kickoff 78 yards for a touchdown, essentially putting the game out of reach.

==== Husson ====
Week 3: Anna Maria at Husson

Team	1	2	3	4	Total
Anna Maria	0	0	0	12	12
• Husson	23	14	14	12	63

- Date: September 19
- Location: Winkin Athletic Conference
  Bangor, ME
- Game attendance: 1,000
- Game weather: Temperature: 65 °F (18 °C) • Weather: Partly cloudy

The Eagles wasted no time taking control of the game, scoring on the first offensive play of the game after Anna Maria quarterback Santino Simone fumbled while attempting to pass. Husson's Chris Dalecki recovered the fumble, and tailback Julius Williams quickly ran for an 18-yard touchdown, giving the Eagles an early 7–0 lead. Husson added a safety and two touchdowns in quick succession, with Byron Jackson running for a 13-yard touchdown and quarterback Jack Hersom scoring on an 8-yard option run, building a commanding 23–0 lead in the first quarter.

In the second quarter, Husson continued to dominate. After a fumble recovery by Dalecki, Mike Toothaker ran for a 4-yard touchdown, and Williams added another 5-yard touchdown, increasing the Eagles' lead to 30–0. Husson's Ramael Barton then electrified the crowd with a 73-yard punt return for a touchdown, and Jamie Bonnell followed with a 3-yard touchdown run, making it 51–0 by the third quarter.

Anna Maria finally got on the scoreboard in the fourth quarter, as Ernie Jones ran for a 6-yard touchdown, cutting the deficit to 51–6. However, Husson responded with a 16-yard field goal from Carlos Romero and Brett Kwaak's 7-yard touchdown run, extending the lead to 58–6. The Amcats scored once more when Stephen Johnson ran for a 3-yard touchdown, but Husson's De Vaughan Mitchell intercepted the ensuing two-point conversion pass and returned it 102 yards for a touchdown, sealing the 63–12 victory.

Despite the loss, Anna Maria showed determination throughout the game. Head coach Marc Klaiman acknowledged the effort of his players, stating, "Our kids have good character. They never stopped playing." However, he also noted the challenges of facing a team with more experience, saying, "We're mostly freshmen playing against men. There's a difference between an 18-year-old man and a 22-year-old man."

==== Castleton (homecoming) ====
Week 7: Castleton at Anna Maria

Team	1	2	3	4	Total
• Castleton	7	7	0	10	24
Anna Maria	0	7	14	0	21

- Date: October 17
- Location: AMCAT Field
  Paxton, MA
- Game attendance: 800
- Game weather: Temperature: 53 °F (12 °C) • Weather: Sunny, clear
- Referee: Barry Fowler

The Spartans took an early 14–0 lead with touchdown runs by freshman Tyler Carpenter, who scored on a 5-yard run in the first quarter and a 2-yard run in the second. However, the Amcats responded just before halftime, with wide receiver Domenique Concepcion catching a 12-yard touchdown pass from quarterback Sean Quinlivan, narrowing the gap to 14–7.

In the second half, Anna Maria surged ahead with two touchdown runs by Nick Adames, who powered in from 4 yards and 12 yards, giving the Amcats a 21–14 lead. But Castleton answered with a 5-yard touchdown run by Randy Babineau, tying the game at 21–21.

The decisive moment came with just 15 seconds left when Castleton's Luis Robitaille kicked a 28-yard field goal, securing the Spartans a 24–21 victory.

Nick Adames led the Amcats' offense, rushing for 152 yards on 36 carries. Quarterback Sean Quinlivan threw for 108 yards and a touchdown. Castleton's Tyler Carpenter contributed 104 rushing yards and two touchdowns, while quarterback Shane Brozowski passed for 225 yards and a touchdown.

=== Roster ===
2009 Anna Maria Amcats football team roster
Players
Coaches
Offense

Pos.	#	Name	Class
WR	1	Domenique Concepcion	Fr
WR	2	Devon Nixon	Fr
FB	3	Victor Sosa	Fr
WR	4	Matt Kelly	Jr
WR	5	Terrance Cooley	Fr
QB	7	JC Crowley	So
WR	8	David Marsh	Fr
QB	10	Sean Quinlivan	Fr
RB	11	Stephen Johnson	Fr
QB	12	Santino Simone	Fr
RB	13	Jean Carlos Batista-Santiago	Fr
RB	14	Chris Bizier	Fr
FB	19	Ernest Jones	Fr
RB	21	Nate Adams	Fr
FB	27	Emile Scott	So
RB	28	Angel Colon	Fr
RB	34	Kyle Peterson	Fr
RB	37	Wadscar Gomez	Fr
QB	41	Benjamin Weisner	Fr
FB	49	Jose Rivera	Fr
OL	52	James Coulombe	Fr
TE	53	Anthony Overmars	Fr
OL	54	Nicholas Urato	Fr
OL	58	Benjamin Chick-Reny	Fr
OL	61	Edmund Gregan	Fr
OL	62	Kevin Frattasio	Jr
OL	63	Jason Berry	Fr
FB	68	Luis Hernandez	Fr
OL	75	Frank Andrade	Sr
OL	78	Peter Gonchar	Fr
OL	79	Isaiah Link	Fr
TE	86	Nick McCloskey	Fr
WR	89	Daniel Harper	Fr

Defense

Pos.	#	Name	Class
LB	6	Cameron Brigham	Fr
DB	9	Daniel Conaghan	Sr
DB	15	Stephen Imparato	Fr
DB	16	Zakee Jenkins	Fr
DB	18	Daniel Jr. Gomes	Fr
LB	20	Kevin Fitzpatrick	Fr
DB	22	Julio Valentin	Fr
LB	23	Rich Brandt	So
DB	24	Nii Quartey	Fr
S	25	Christopher Lizotte	Fr
LB	30	Alexander Potter	Fr
DB	31	Lamar Jones	Fr
DE	32	Mark Jones	Fr
DE	33	Angelo Mollis	Jr
DB	35	Michael Conway	Fr
FS	36	Daniel McKenna	Fr
FS	38	Steven Drohan	Fr
DB	39	Edward Maldonado	Fr
LB	44	Steven Sao Pedro	Fr
DE	45	Anthony Cashman	Fr
LB	46	Matt Bowes	Fr
LB	50	Troy Barnes	Fr
LB	51	Ricky Williams	Fr
LB	56	Anthony Colon	Fr
DL	66	Marcus Sinanan	Fr
DL	67	Matt Cantwell (C)	Sr
DL	70	Michael Berry	Fr
DL	72	Stephen Cronin	Fr
DL	73	Darren Wright	Fr
DL	76	Nick Scogna	Fr
LB	77	James Murray	Fr
DB	84	Vincent Harrison	Fr
DE	94	Ben Chan	Fr
DE	96	Blake Simpson	So
DL	97	Michael Nordberg	Fr
DL	98	Carlos Castaneda	Fr
DE	99	Shawn Kelley	Fr

Special teams

Pos.	#	Name	Class
P	17	Kevin Kelly	Fr
PK	26	Jamal Mitchell	Fr

Head coach

- Marc Klaiman

Coordinators/assistant coaches

- Bob Frey – Assistant head coach & offensive coordinator
- Brian Hayes – Quarterbacks coach
- Michael Caira – Assistant coach
- Dean Mougenot – Assistant coach
- Andrew Dalton – Assistant coach
- Kevin Anderson – Assistant coach

Legend

- (C) Team captain
- (S) Suspended
- (I) Ineligible
- Injured
- Redshirt

Roster
Last update: April 3, 2025

== 2010 ==
2010 Anna Maria Amcats football
- Conference: Eastern Collegiate Football Conference
- Record: 0–10 (0–7 ECFC)
- Head coach: Marc Klaiman (2nd season)
- Offensive coordinator: Brian Hayes (1st season)
- Defensive coordinator: Vince Sinagra (1st season)
- Captain: Nii Quartey
- Home stadium: AMCAT Field

2010 Eastern Collegiate Football Conference standings
	Conf.			Overall
Team	W		L	W		L
Maritime $^	7	–	0	10	–	1
Norwich	5	–	2	8	–	3
Castleton	5	–	2	5	–	4
Mount Ida	5	–	2	6	–	5
Gallaudet	3	–	4	3	–	5
Becker	2	–	5	2	–	8
Husson	1	–	6	1	–	9
Anna Maria	0	–	7	0	–	10
$ – Conference champion; ^ – NCAA Division III playoff participant

The 2010 Anna Maria Amcats football team represented Anna Maria College of Paxton, Massachusetts. In its second year under head coach Marc Klaiman, Anna Maria compiled an overall record of 0–10 as a member of the Eastern Collegiate Football Conference (ECFC) with a conference record of 0–7.

Offensive coordinator Bob Frey left to become the defensive coordinator for Kansas Wesleyan. In his place, quarterbacks coach Brian Hayes was promoted to offensive coordinator, while Norfolk State linebackers coach Vince Sinagra was named defensive coordinator.

Notable players include senior transfer from Sacred Heart Mook Zimmerman and All-ECFC wide receiver Domenique Concepcion who finished the season with 53 catches, 523 yards, and four touchdowns.

=== Schedule ===
Date	Time	Opponent	Site	Result	Attendance	Source
September 2		at Worcester State*	Worcester, MA; John F. Coughlin Field	Postponed		
September 4	5:00 p.m.	at Worcester State*	Worcester, MA; John F. Coughlin Field	L 21–49	1,000	
September 11	1:00 p.m.	Maine Maritime*	Paxton, MA; AMCAT Field	L 0–47	500	
September 18	2:00 p.m.	at Malone*	Canton, OH; Fawcett Stadium	L 0–69	1,200	
September 25	5:00 p.m.	at Becker	Leicester, MA; Alumni Field	L 32–42	917	
October 2	2:00 p.m.	Maritime	Paxton, MA; AMCAT Field	L 20–43	412	
October 9	1:00 p.m.	Husson	Paxton, MA; AMCAT Field	L 38–53	386	
October 16	1:00 p.m.	Castleton	Paxton, MA; AMCAT Field	L 35–49	413	
October 23	1:00 p.m.	Norwich	Paxton, MA; AMCAT Field	L 7–81	320	
October 30	1:30 p.m.	at Gallaudet	Washington, D.C.; Hotchkiss Field	L 6–33	2,000	
November 6	12:00 p.m.	at Mount Ida	Newton, MA; Alumni Field	L 18–69	700	
*Non-conference game

=== Roster ===
2010 Anna Maria Amcats football team roster
Players
Coaches
Offense

Pos.	#	Name	Class
WR	1	Domenique Concepcion	So
QB	2	Santino Simone	So
RB	3	Chris Meadows	Jr
WR	4	Matt Kelly	Sr
WR	5	Coy Carter	Fr
RB	6	Dylan McGregor	Fr
WR	8	David Marsh	So
QB	11	Kevin McCoy	Fr
WR	12	Donnell Chism	Fr
RB/DB	13	Jean Batista	So
QB	15	Andrew Fredericks	Fr
QB	16	John LaMothe	Fr
QB	17	Jonathan Lydon	Fr
WR	19	Corey Hyman	So
RB	21	Robert Small	Fr
RB/K	26	Jamal Mitchell	So
FB	38	Jonathon LaCasse	Jr
RB	44	Shane O'Brien	Fr
RB	46	Kevin Rivera	Fr
OL	53	Anthony Overmars	So
OL	54	Andre Sims	Fr
RB	56	Tony Scott-Sandagato	Fr
OL	57	Luis Saavedra	Fr
OL	65	Ariel Ramos	Fr
OL/LS	67	Jacob Young	Fr
OL	68	Taylor Ewen	Fr
OL	72	Brian Conneely	Fr
OL	73	Stephen Hart	Fr
OL	77	Timothy Laramee	Fr
OL	78	Patrick Driscoll	Fr
OL	79	Corey VanDeventer	Fr
TE	81	Joseph Cournoyer	Fr
WR	82	Tyler Ferreira	Fr
WR	83	Gregory Caldwell	Fr
TE	84	Tyler Mattoon	Fr
TE	85	Justin Cascone	So
TE	86	Blake Simpson	Jr
WR	87	Jonathan Kenyon	Fr

Defense

Pos.	#	Name	Class
DB	7	Lamarr Jones	So
DB	9	Julio Valentin	So
DB	10	Demetri Underwood	Fr
DB	22	Tim Ray	Fr
LB	23	Rich Brandt	Jr
LB	24	Nii Quartey	Jr
LB	25	Christopher Lizotte	So
LB	27	Joshua Otero	Fr
DB	28	Juladeau Tulysse	Fr
DB	33	Tony Valente	Fr
LB	34	Kyle Peterson	So
DB	35	Mike Murach	Fr
DB	37	Jason Smith	Fr
LB	41	Tyler Amato	Fr
LB	42	Jordan Koehler	Fr
LB	43	Mike Joseph	Fr
LB	47	Justin Edson	So
LB	48	Casey Goguen	Fr
LB	50	Troy Barnes	So
DL	51	Ricky Williams	So
LB	52	Dylan Bedard	Fr
LB	55	Juan Juan	Fr
LB	58	Jacob Parker	Fr
LB	59	Nick Palermo	Fr
LB	60	Andrew Berrios	Fr
DL	61	Edmund Gregan	So
DL	66	Charles Lewis	Fr
DL	69	Marcus Sinanan	So
DL	70	Michael Berry	So
DL	71	Ja Vaun Stockton	Fr
DL	74	Jim Sherwood	Fr
DB	88	Kevin Brown	Jr
DL	90	Aaron Bento	Fr
LB	92	Quincy Thomas	Fr
DL	93	Justin Juste	Fr
DL	95	Tevin Fitzgerald	Fr
LB	96	John Hart	Fr
DL	98	Joseph Williams	Fr

Special teams

Pos.	#	Name	Class
LS	94	Ryan Santos	Fr

Head coach

- Marc Klaiman

Coordinators/assistant coaches

- Vince Sinagra – Defensive coordinator
- Brian Hayes – Offensive coordinator & quarterbacks coach
- Andrew Dalton – Assistant coach
- Kevin Anderson – Assistant coach
- Matt Cantwell – Gruadate assistant
- Peter Krafka – Assistant coach
- Jerell Smith – Assistant coach

Legend

- (C) Team captain
- (S) Suspended
- (I) Ineligible
- Injured
- Redshirt

Roster
Last update: April 12, 2025

== 2011 ==
2011 Anna Maria Amcats football
- Conference: Eastern Collegiate Football Conference
- Record: 2–8 (2–5 ECFC)
- Head coach: Marc Klaiman (3rd season)
- Offensive coordinator: Brian Hayes (2nd season)
- Defensive coordinator: Vince Sinagra (2nd season)
- Home stadium: AMCAT Field

2011 Eastern Collegiate Football Conference standings
	Conf.			Overall
Team	W		L	W		L
Norwich $^	7	–	0	7	–	4
Maritime	6	–	1	8	–	2
Mount Ida	5	–	2	6	–	5
Gallaudet	4	–	3	5	–	5
Castleton	3	–	4	4	–	6
Anna Maria	2	–	5	2	–	8
Becker	1	–	6	1	–	9
Husson	0	–	7	0	–	10
$ – Conference champion; ^ – NCAA Division III playoff participant

The 2011 Anna Maria Amcats football team represented Anna Maria College of Paxton, Massachusetts. In its third and final year under head coach Marc Klaiman, Anna Maria compiled an overall record of 2–8 as a member of the Eastern Collegiate Football Conference (ECFC) with a conference record of 2–5.

After losing the first 27 games of the team's existence, Klaiman led the team to back-to-back wins to close out a 2–8 campaign. Klaiman was fired following his third season, amassing an overall record of 2–27. Defensive coordinator Vince Sinagra was named interim head coach, before being named to the full-time position prior to the start of the next season.

Wide receiver Domenique Concepcion earned First-team All-ECFC honors, becoming the program's first three-time all-conference selection. Quarterback Santino Simone and tight end Blake Simpson were also recognized, receiving Second-team All-ECFC accolades.

=== Schedule ===
Date	Time	Opponent	Site	Result	Attendance	Source
September 3	5:00 p.m.	Worcester State*	Paxton, MA; AMCAT Field	L 30–55	737	
September 10	12:00 p.m.	at Maine Maritime*	Castine, ME; Ritchie Field	L 13–42	1,283	
September 24	1:00 p.m.	at Castleton	Castleton, VT; Spartan Stadium	L 52–56	3,640	
October 1	1:00 p.m.	Gallaudet	Paxton, MA; AMCAT Field	L 40–48 ^{(3OT)}	937	
October 8	1:00 p.m.	Mount Ida	Paxton, MA; AMCAT Field	L 7–56	654	
October 15	2:00 p.m.	at Maritime	Throggs Neck, NY; Reinhart Field	L 13–34	3,000	
October 22	5:00 p.m.	Castleton*	Paxton, MA; AMCAT Field	L 34–39	879	
October 29	1:00 p.m.	at Norwich	Northfield, VT; Sabine Field	L 24–45	879	
November 5	1:00 p.m.	Becker	Paxton, MA; AMCAT Field	W 35–33	1,077	
November 12	1:00 p.m.	at Husson	Bangor, ME; Winkin Athletic Conference	W 31–28	342	
*Non-conference game

=== Roster ===
2011 Anna Maria Amcats football team roster
Players
Coaches
Offense

Pos.	#	Name	Class
WR	1	Domenique Concepcion	Jr
QB	2	Santino Simone	Jr
RB	3	Chris Meadows	Sr
RB	5	Robert Small	So
WR	7	Coy Carter	So
WR	8	David Marsh	Jr
WR	12	Donnell Chism	So
RB	13	Jean Batista-Santiago	Jr
QB	16	John LaMothe	So
WR	17	Azariah Rice	Fr
WR	18	Joseph Diaz	Fr
RB	20	Ken Woods	Fr
RB	30	John Decker	Fr
RB	32	Bobby Payer	Fr
LB/P	34	Kyle Peterson	Jr
RB	45	Anthony Morrisino	Fr
RB	46	Kevin Rivera	So
WR	81	Chris Akins	So
WR	83	Gregory Caldwell	So
WR	84	Josh Sundquist	So
TE	86	Blake Simpson	Sr
WR	87	Johnathan Kenyon	So
WR	89	Lumont Deshield	Fr
OL	51	Kellen Brown	Fr
OL	52	Sean Hamilton	So
OL	53	Tyler Noelte	Fr
OL	56	Alex Marinelli	Fr
OL	57	Shane McKeon	Fr
OL	58	Kyle Connors	Fr
OL	60	Nick Vento	So
OL	62	Zachary Hathaway	Fr
OL	63	Daniel Provost	So
OL	64	Chris Lee	So
OL	65	Adam Goguen	Fr
OL	66	Adam Germain	So
OL	67	Jesse Stolz	Fr
OL	68	Kyle Boucher	Fr
OL	69	Lucas Levesque	Fr

Defense

Pos.	#	Name	Class
DB	6	Derek Dortch	So
DB	9	Julio Valentin	Jr
DB	10	Demetri Underwood	So
DB	11	Kevin McCoy	So
DB	19	Sam Toussaint	Fr
DB	21	Chris Nelson	Fr
DB	22	Tim Ray	So
DL	23	Richard Brandt	Sr
LB	24	Nii Quartey	Sr
LB	25	Nick Smith	Fr
DB	27	Joshua Otero	So
DL	28	Jason Campbell	Fr
DB	29	Matt Charves	Fr
DB	31	Kevin Brown	Sr
DB	33	Tony Valente	So
LB	36	Dan McKenna	Jr
DB	37	Justin Bailey	Fr
LB	40	Johnathan Joseph	Fr
LB	41	Matt Levasseur	So
LB	42	Jordan Koehler	So
LB	43	Mike Joseph	So
DB	44	Billy Bishop	Fr
LB	50	Troy Barnes	Jr
DL	54	Andre Sims	So
DL	55	Joseph Williams	So
DL	61	Edmund Gregen	Jr
DL	70	Michael Berry	Jr
DL	78	Patrick Driscoll	So
DL	80	Steve Almquist	So
DL	91	Matthew Piazza	Fr
RB	92	Quincy Thomas	So
DL	93	Dylan Webster	Fr
DL	94	Ryan Santos	So
DL	95	Andrew Nevit	Fr
DL	96	Terrel Harris	Fr
LB	97	Kevin Card	Fr
DL	98	Mike Kennedy	Fr
LB	99	Dan O'Malley	Fr

Special teams

Pos.	#	Name	Class
K	26	Jamal Mitchell	Jr

Head coach

- Marc Klaiman

Coordinators/assistant coaches

- Vince Sinagra – Defensive coordinator
- Brian Hayes – Offensive coordinator & quarterbacks coach
- Andrew Dalton – Assistant coach
- Matt Kelly – Assistant coach
- Ryan Kelly – Assistant coach
- Rocco DiMeco – Linebackers coach & strength and conditioning coordinator

Legend

- (C) Team captain
- (S) Suspended
- (I) Ineligible
- Injured
- Redshirt

Roster
Last update: April 14, 2025

== 2012 ==
2012 Anna Maria Amcats football
- Conference: Eastern Collegiate Football Conference
- Record: 2–8 (1–6 ECFC)
- Head coach: Vince Sinagra (1st season)
- Offensive coordinator: Brian Hayes (3rd season)
- Defensive coordinator: Rocco DiMeco (1st season)
- Home stadium: AMCAT Field

2012 Eastern Collegiate Football Conference standings
	Conf.			Overall
Team	W		L	W		L
Mount Ida +^	6	–	1	8	–	3
Castleton +	6	–	1	7	–	4
Gallaudet	5	–	2	7	–	3
Norwich	4	–	2	7	–	3
Maritime	2	–	4	3	–	6
Becker	2	–	5	3	–	7
Anna Maria	1	–	6	2	–	8
Husson	1	–	6	2	–	8
+ – Conference co-champions; ^ – NCAA Division III playoff participant

The 2012 Anna Maria Amcats football team represented Anna Maria College of Paxton, Massachusetts. In its first year under head coach Vince Sinagra, Anna Maria compiled an overall record of 2–8 as a member of the Eastern Collegiate Football Conference (ECFC) with a conference record of 1–6.

With Sinagra being promoted to head coach, linebackers coach and strength and conditioning coordinator Rocco DiMeco assumed the defensive coordinator position.

Three Amcats earned First-team All-ECFC honors: running back Robert Small, wide receiver Domenique Concepcion—now a four-time all-conference selection—and tight end Josh Sundquist. Linebacker Jordan Koehler was also recognized with a Second-team All-ECFC selection.

=== Schedule ===
Date	Time	Opponent	Site	Result	Attendance	Source
August 31	7:00 p.m.	at Worcester State*	Worcester, MA; John F. Coughlin Field	L 10–56	2,250	
September 8	1:00 p.m.	Maine Maritime*	Paxton, MA; AMCAT Field	W 34–14	1,008	
September 15	1:00 p.m.	at Husson*	Bangor, ME; Winkin Athletic Complex	L 22–28	609	
September 29	12:00 p.m.	at Gallaudet	Washington, D.C.; Hotchkiss Field	L 24–52	512	
October 6	1:00 p.m.	at Mount Ida	Newton, MA; Alumni Field	L 35–48	500	
October 13	2:00 p.m.	Maritime	Paxton, MA; AMCAT Field	L 21–42	1,308	
October 20	3:00 p.m.	Castleton	Paxton, MA; AMCAT Field	L 33–54	1,545	
October 27	1:00 p.m.	Norwich	Paxton, MA; AMCAT Field	L 21–50	1,058	
November 3	12:00 p.m.	at Becker	Leicester, MA; Alumni Field	L 7–27	1,362	
November 10	1:00 p.m.	Husson	Paxton, MA; AMCAT Field	W 44–42 ^{(3OT)}	1,211	
*Non-conference game

== 2013 ==
2013 Anna Maria Amcats football
- Conference: Eastern Collegiate Football Conference
- Record: 2–8 (1–6 ECFC)
- Head coach: Vince Sinagra (2nd season)
- Offensive coordinator: Brian Hayes (4th season)
- Home stadium: AMCAT Field

2013 Eastern Collegiate Football Conference standings
	Conf.			Overall
Team	W		L	W		L
Gallaudet +^	6	–	1	9	–	2
Norwich +	6	–	1	7	–	4
Maritime	5	–	2	5	–	5
Husson	4	–	3	5	–	5
Mount Ida	4	–	3	5	–	5
Becker	2	–	5	3	–	7
Anna Maria	1	–	6	2	–	8
Castleton	0	–	7	1	–	9
+ – Conference co-champions; ^ – NCAA Division III playoff participant

The 2013 Anna Maria Amcats football team represented Anna Maria College of Paxton, Massachusetts. In its second year under head coach Vince Sinagra, Anna Maria compiled an overall record of 2–8 as a member of the Eastern Collegiate Football Conference (ECFC) with a conference record of 1–6.

Defensive coordinator Rocco DiMeco resigned prior to the season to become the outside linebackers coach for Holy Cross.

Running back Robert Small earned ECFC Offensive Player of the Year honors and was named a First-team All-ECFC selection. Defensive lineman Jordan Koehler also received First-team All-ECFC recognition. Linebacker William Ricard and defensive back Demetri Underwood were named to the Second-team All-ECFC.

=== Schedule ===
Date	Time	Opponent	Site	Result	Attendance	Source
September 7	1:00 p.m.	Worcester State*	Paxton, MA; AMCAT Field	L 6–34	1,247	
September 14	12:00 p.m.	at Maine Maritime*	Castine, ME; Ritchie Field	W 55–49	833	
September 28	1:00 p.m.	at Catholic University*	Washington, D.C.; Cardinal Stadium	L 0–49	6,409	
October 5	1:00 p.m.	at Maritime	Throggs Neck, NY; Reinhart Field	L 24–35	1,423	
October 12	3:00 p.m.	Husson	Paxton, MA; AMCAT Field	L 14–35	1,306	
October 19	1:00 p.m.	at Mount Ida	Newton, MA; Alumni Field	L 34–56	699	
October 26	4:00 p.m.	at Norwich	Northfield, VT; Sabine Field	L 6–38	502	
November 2	1:30 p.m.	Castleton	Paxton, MA; AMCAT Field	W 42–14	1,106	
November 9	12:00 p.m.	at Gallaudet	Washington, D.C.; Hotchkiss Field	L 7–35	768	
November 15	7:00 p.m.	Becker	Paxton, MA; AMCAT Field	L 19–24	1,246	
*Non-conference game

== 2014 ==
2014 Anna Maria Amcats football
- Conference: Eastern Collegiate Football Conference
- Record: 0–10 (0–7 ECFC)
- Head coach: Vince Sinagra (3rd season)
- Offensive coordinator: Rob Sturgis (1st season)
- Defensive coordinator: Edwyn Edwards (1st season)
- Home stadium: AMCAT Field

2014 Eastern Collegiate Football Conference standings
	Conf.			Overall
Team	W		L	W		L
Husson $^	7	–	0	8	–	2
Castleton	5	–	2	7	–	3
Norwich	5	–	2	7	–	4
Mount Ida	5	–	2	5	–	5
Maritime	3	–	4	4	–	6
Gallaudet	2	–	5	2	–	7
Becker	1	–	6	1	–	9
Anna Maria	0	–	7	0	–	10
$ – Conference champion; ^ – NCAA Division III playoff participant

The 2014 Anna Maria Amcats football team represented Anna Maria College of Paxton, Massachusetts. In its third year under head coach Vince Sinagra, Anna Maria compiled an overall record of 0–10 as a member of the Eastern Collegiate Football Conference (ECFC) with a conference record of 0–7.

Sinagra promoted defensive backs coach Edwyn Edwards to defensive coordinator prior to the season.

Several players earned all-conference honors following the season. Punter Stefano Marziale was named First-team All-ECFC. Second-team All-ECFC selections included running back Chris Bettano, wide receivers Ryan McCarthy and Will Ricard, offensive lineman Kevin Grey, and linebacker Mike Sinto.

=== Schedule ===
Date	Time	Opponent	Site	Result	Attendance	Source
September 5	7:00 p.m.	at Worcester State*	Worcester, MA; John F. Coughlin Field	L 6–38	1,250	
September 13	3:00 p.m.	Maine Maritime*	Paxton, MA; AMCAT Field	L 12–42	743	
September 27	1:00 p.m.	Catholic University*	Paxton, MA; AMCAT Field	L 25–54	526	
October 4	1:00 p.m.	Gallaudet	Paxton, MA; AMCAT Field	L 26–53	205	
October 11	1:00 p.m.	at Castleton	Castleton, VT; Spartan Stadium	L 9–65	1,310	
October 18	3:00 p.m.	Maritime	Paxton, MA; AMCAT Field	L 12–40	987	
October 25	3:00 p.m.	Norwich	Paxton, MA; AMCAT Field	L 20–28	892	
November 1	12:30 p.m.	at Husson	Bangor, ME; Winkin Athletic Complex	L 20–42	1,800	
November 8	1:00 p.m.	Mount Ida	Paxton, MA; AMCAT Field	L 12–14	792	
November 15	12:00 p.m.	at Becker	Leicester, MA; Alumni Field	L 14–17 ^{(OT)}	2,123	
*Non-conference game

== 2015 ==
2015 Anna Maria Amcats football
- Conference: Eastern Collegiate Football Conference
- Record: 1–9 (1–6 ECFC)
- Head coach: Vince Sinagra (4th season)
- Offensive coordinator: Rob Sturgis (2nd season)
- Defensive coordinator: Edwyn Edwards (2nd season)
- Captains: Christopher Bettano; Kevin Grey; Aaron Koehler; Victor Sambola; Michael Sinto
- Home stadium: AMCAT Field

2015 Eastern Collegiate Football Conference standings
	Conf.			Overall
Team	W		L	W		L
Husson +	6	–	1	7	–	3
Norwich +^	6	–	1	6	–	5
Castleton	5	–	2	7	–	3
Becker	5	–	2	7	–	3
Maritime	3	–	4	5	–	5
Mount Ida	2	–	5	2	–	8
Anna Maria	1	–	6	1	–	9
Gallaudet	0	–	7	0	–	9
+ – Conference co-champions; ^ – NCAA Division III playoff participant

The 2015 Anna Maria Amcats football team represented Anna Maria College of Paxton, Massachusetts. In its fourth year under head coach Vince Sinagra, Anna Maria compiled an overall record of 1–9 as a member of the Eastern Collegiate Football Conference (ECFC) with a conference record of 1–6.

Three players earn Second-team All-ECFC honors following the season: offensive lineman Kevin Grey, linebacker Mike Sinto, and punter Stefano Marziale.

=== Schedule ===
Date	Time	Opponent	Site	Result	Attendance	Source
September 3	7:00 p.m.	at Coast Guard*	New London, CT; Cadet Memorial Field	L 6–34	1,650	
September 12	1:00 p.m.	Nichols*	Paxton, MA; AMCAT Field	L 39–51	607	
September 19	3:00 p.m.	Curry*	Paxton, MA; AMCAT Field	L 16–23	869	
October 3	2:00 p.m.	at Maritime	Throggs Neck, NY; Reinhart Field	L 7–44	811	
October 10	2:00 p.m.	Husson	Paxton, MA; AMCAT Field	L 7–46	508	
October 17	1:00 p.m.	at Mount Ida	Newton, MA; Alumni Field	L 6–41	431	
October 24	1:30 p.m.	at Norwich	Northfield, VT; Sabine Field	L 6–47	176	
October 31	3:00 p.m.	Castleton	Paxton, MA; AMCAT Field	L 14–17	708	
November 7	12:00 p.m.	at Gallaudet	Washington, D.C.; Hotchkiss Field	W 24–20	242	
November 14	1:00 p.m.	Becker	Paxton, MA; AMCAT Field	L 7–41	1,063	
*Non-conference game

== 2016 ==
2016 Anna Maria Amcats football
- Conference: Eastern Collegiate Football Conference
- Record: 1–9 (1–6 ECFC)
- Head coach: Vince Sinagra (5th season)
- Offensive coordinator: Rob Sturgis (3rd season)
- Defensive coordinator: Jordan Koehler (1st season)
- Home stadium: AMCAT Field

2016 Eastern Collegiate Football Conference standings
	Conf.			Overall
Team	W		L	W		L
Husson $^	7	–	0	9	–	2
Norwich	5	–	2	5	–	5
Maritime	4	–	3	6	–	5
Castleton	4	–	3	4	–	6
Mount Ida	4	–	3	4	–	6
Becker	2	–	5	3	–	7
Gallaudet	1	–	6	2	–	8
Anna Maria	1	–	6	1	–	9
$ – Conference champion; ^ – NCAA Division III playoff participant

The 2016 Anna Maria Amcats football team represented Anna Maria College of Paxton, Massachusetts. In its fifth and final year under head coach Vince Sinagra, Anna Maria compiled an overall record of 1–9 as a member of the Eastern Collegiate Football Conference (ECFC) with a conference record of 1–6.

In October, Sinagra announced his intentions to resign after the season. He ended his tenure with an overall record of 6–44.

Punter Francis Cole was the team's lone All-ECFC selection.

=== Schedule ===
Date	Time	Opponent	Site	Result	Attendance	Source
September 1	7:00 p.m.	Coast Guard*	Paxton, MA; AMCAT Field	L 0–34	1,498	
September 9	7:00 p.m.	at Nichols*	Dudley, MA; Vendetti Field	L 7–22	649	
September 17	1:00 p.m.	at Curry*	Milton, MA; Walter M. Katz Field	L 3–42	744	
October 1	1:00 p.m.	at Castleton	Castleton, VT; Spartan Stadium	L 13–23	1,910	
October 8	2:00 p.m.	Maritime	Paxton, MA; AMCAT Field	L 0–22	672	
October 15	1:00 p.m.	Norwich	Paxton, MA; AMCAT Field	L 7–28	890	
October 22	12:00 p.m.	at Husson	Bangor, ME; Winkin Athletic Complex	L 0–42	750	
October 29	1:00 p.m.	Mount Ida	Paxton, MA; AMCAT Field	L 21–44	458	
November 5	1:00 p.m.	Gallaudet	Paxton, MA; AMCAT Field	W 27–13	469	
November 12	12:00 p.m.	at Becker	Leicester, MA; Alumni Field	L 7–31	973	
*Non-conference game

== 2017 ==
2017 Anna Maria Amcats football
- Conference: Eastern Collegiate Football Conference
- Record: 1–9 (1–6 ECFC)
- Head coach: Dan Mulrooney (1st season)
- Offensive coordinator: Steve Croce (1st season)
- Defensive coordinator: Dan Mulrooney (1st season)
- Co-defensive coordinator: Craig Richardson (1st season)
- Home stadium: AMCAT Field

2017 Eastern Collegiate Football Conference standings
	Conf.			Overall
Team	W		L	W		L
No. 25 Husson $^	7	–	0	10	–	2
Maritime	6	–	1	9	–	2
Castleton	5	–	2	6	–	4
Mount Ida	3	–	4	4	–	6
Gallaudet	3	–	4	3	–	7
Dean #	2	–	5	4	–	6
Alfred State #	1	–	6	1	–	9
Anna Maria	1	–	6	1	–	9
$ – Conference champion; ^ – NCAA Division III playoff participant; # – Provisional Division III member; Rankings from D3football.com

The 2017 Anna Maria Amcats football team represented Anna Maria College of Paxton, Massachusetts. In its first year under head coach Dan Mulrooney, Anna Maria compiled an overall record of 1–9 as a member of the Eastern Collegiate Football Conference (ECFC) with a conference record of 1–6.

Anna Maria announced WPI defensive coordinator Dan Mulrooney as the team's third head coach all-time. Mulrooney promoted quarterbacks coach Steve Croce to offensive coordinator and hired Craig Richardson to serve alongside him as co-defensive coordinator.

Wide receiver Trai Weaver was named a First-team All-ECFC selection following the season. Offensive lineman Dan Stout and punter Camden Brown earned Second-team All-ECFC honors.

=== Schedule ===
Date	Time	Opponent	Site	Result	Attendance	Source
September 1	7:30 p.m.	at WPI*	Worcester, MA; Alumni Stadium	L 0–48	2,504	
September 8	7:00 p.m.	Nichols*	Paxton, MA; AMCAT Field	L 21–28	1,200	
September 15	7:00 p.m.	Curry*	Paxton, MA; AMCAT Field	L 20–47	1,104	
September 30	3:00 p.m.	Castleton	Paxton, MA; AMCAT Field	L 14–27	1,000	
October 7	1:00 p.m.	at Gallaudet	Washington, D.C.; Hotchkiss Field	L 23–73	473	
October 14	2:00 p.m.	at Maritime	Throggs Neck, NY; Reinhart Field	L 15–51	2,350	
October 21	1:00 p.m.	Alfred State	Paxton, MA; AMCAT Field	W 36–34	2,000	
October 28	1:00 p.m.	Husson	Paxton, MA; AMCAT Field	L 13–70	800	
November 4	1:00 p.m.	at Mount Ida	Newton, MA; Alumni Field	L 41–58	524	
November 11	12:00 p.m.	Dean	Paxton, MA; AMCAT Field	L 0–27	750	
*Non-conference game

== 2018 ==
2018 Anna Maria Amcats football
- Conference: Eastern Collegiate Football Conference
- Record: 1–9 (1–5 ECFC)
- Head coach: Dan Mulrooney (2nd season)
- Offensive coordinator: Steve Croce (2nd season)
- Co-offensive coordinator: Brett Banfield (1st season)
- Defensive coordinator: Dan Mulrooney (2nd season)
- Captains: Emmanuel Leake; Kai Nero-Clark; Paul Robitaille; Dan Stout; Carl St. Paul
- Home stadium: AMCAT Field

2018 Eastern Collegiate Football Conference standings
	Conf.			Overall
Team	W		L	W		L
Husson $^	6	–	0	8	–	3
Maritime	5	–	1	7	–	4
Dean #	4	–	2	5	–	5
Gallaudet	3	–	3	3	–	5
Castleton	1	–	5	2	–	8
Alfred State	1	–	5	1	–	9
Anna Maria	1	–	5	1	–	9
$ – Conference champion; ^ – NCAA Division III playoff participant; # – Provisional Division III member

The 2018 Anna Maria Amcats football team represented Anna Maria College of Paxton, Massachusetts. In its second year under head coach Dan Mulrooney, Anna Maria compiled an overall record of 1–9 as a member of the Eastern Collegiate Football Conference (ECFC) with a conference record of 1–5.

Offensive lineman Dan Stout was named to the First-team All-ECFC, while defensive lineman Kai Nero-Clark earned Second-team All-ECFC honors.

=== Schedule ===
Date	Time	Opponent	Site	Result	Attendance	Source
August 31	7:00 p.m.	WPI*	Paxton, MA; AMCAT Field	L 0–54	1,132	
September 7	7:00 p.m.	at Nichols*	Dudley, MA; Vendetti Field	L 14–35	1,073	
September 15	1:00 p.m.	at Curry*	Milton, MA; Walter M. Katz Field	L 7–41	1,028	
September 22	1:00 p.m.	at Western New England	Springfield, MA; Golden Bear Stadium	L 7–59	2,013	
September 29	12:00 p.m.	Gallaudet^{†}	Paxton, MA; AMCAT Field	L 9–29	1,200	
October 6	2:00 p.m.	at Castleton	Castleton, VT; Dave Wolk Stadium	W 31–24	1,653	
October 20	1:00 p.m.	at Husson	Bangor, ME; Winkin Athletic Complex	L 14–54	1,500	
October 27	1:00 p.m.	Maritime	Paxton, MA; AMCAT Field	L 7–14	500	
November 3	1:00 p.m.	at Alfred State	Alfred, NY; Pioneer Stadium	L 28–30	611	
November 10	12:00 p.m.	at Dean	Franklin, MA; Dale Lippert Field	L 13–19	1,209	
*Non-conference game; ^{†}Homecoming

== 2019 ==
2019 Anna Maria Amcats football
- Conference: Eastern Collegiate Football Conference
- Record: 2–8 (2–3 ECFC)
- Head coach: Dan Mulrooney (3rd season)
- Offensive coordinator: Steve Croce (3rd season)
- Co-offensive coordinator: Brett Banfield (2nd season)
- Defensive coordinator: Dan Mulrooney (3rd season)
- Captains: Hayden Braga; Darrin Cooper; Ronte Cooper; Dylan Diorio; Emmanuel Leake; Carl St. Paul; Devin White
- Home stadium: AMCAT/Caparso Field

2019 Eastern Collegiate Football Conference standings
	Conf.			Overall
Team	W		L	W		L
Dean $#	4	–	1	4	–	6
Maritime ^	3	–	2	5	–	6
Alfred State	2	–	3	3	–	6
Gallaudet	2	–	3	2	–	6
Castleton	2	–	3	2	–	7
Anna Maria	2	–	3	2	–	8
$ – Conference champion; ^ – NCAA Division III playoff participant; # – Provisional Division III member

The 2019 Anna Maria Amcats football team represented Anna Maria College of Paxton, Massachusetts. In its third year under head coach Dan Mulrooney, Anna Maria compiled an overall record of 2–8 as a member of the Eastern Collegiate Football Conference (ECFC) with a conference record of 2–3.

Prior to the season, AMCAT Field was resurfaced. Alongside the remodel, the field was dedicated to Richard Caparso, who donated $250,000 to the college.

Wide receiver David Robinson was named ECFC Rookie of the Year and earned First-team All-ECFC honors alongside wide receiver Hayden Braga, tight end Alex Cohen, and defensive back Tyshawn Anderson. Second-team All-ECFC selections included returner Marquis Roderique, defensive lineman James Johnson, linebackers Dylan Diorio and Swavaughn Smalls, and defensive back Darrin Cooper.

=== Schedule ===
Date	Time	Opponent	Site	Result	Attendance	Source
September 6	7:00 p.m.	at Becker*	Leicester, MA; Alumni Field	L 19–33	698	
September 14	1:00 p.m.	Union (NY)*	Paxton, MA; AMCAT Field	L 7–54	512	
September 21	2:00 p.m.	Nichols*	Paxton, MA; AMCAT Field	L 20–37	594	
September 28	1:00 p.m.	at RPI*	Troy, NY; East Campus Stadium	L 0–38	1,520	
October 5	12:00 p.m.	Apprentice	Paxton, MA; AMCAT Field	L 20–35	400	
October 12	12:00 p.m.	at Alfred State	Alfred, NY; Pioneer Stadium	W 21–20	2,120	
October 19	1:00 p.m.	Dean	Paxton, MA; Caparso Field	L 20–41	1,002	
October 26	2:00 p.m.	Maritime	Paxton, MA; Caparso Field	L 10–13 ^{(OT)}	469	
November 2	2:00 p.m.	at Castleton	Castleton, VT; Dave Wolk Stadium	L 19–33	1,553	
November 9	12:00 p.m.	Gallaudet	Paxton, MA; Caparso Field	W 53–14	669	
*Non-conference game
