= Anna Maria Amcats football, 2020–2025 =

American college football seasons

2020–2025 Anna Maria Amcats football
- Conference: ECFC (2009–2024); MASCAC (2025)
- Head coach: Dan Mulrooney (2017–2021); Steve Croce (2022–2024); Tanner Kingsley (2025)
- Home stadium: Caparso Field (2020–present)

The Anna Maria Amcats football (often stylized as AmCats, AMCATS, or AMcats) teams represented Anna Maria College in American football during the program's second and final decade of college football from 2020 to 2025. The team competed as a member of the Eastern Collegiate Football Conference (ECFC) from 2009 to 2024 and as a member of the Massachusetts State Collegiate Athletic Conference (MASCAC) beginning in 2025. Highlights include the following:

- In 2021, Anna Maria completed their first-ever winning season with a 7–3 record, winning the ECFC and making the NCAA Division III playoffs in the process.
- In 2023, Anna Maria appeared in their first bowl game, losing to Salve Regina, 37–34 in the New England Bowl.

Anna Maria play their home games at Caparso Field.

- In 2025, Anna Maria won a share of the MASCAC title in their first season in the conference before the school closed in May 2026.

The head coaches were Dan Mulrooney (11–29) from 2017 to 2021, Steve Croce (14–14) from 2022 to 2024, and Tanner Kingsley in 2025.

== 2020 ==
2020 Anna Maria Amcats football
- Conference: Eastern Collegiate Football Conference
- Record: 0–0 (0–0 ECFC)
- Head coach: Dan Mulrooney (4th season)
- Offensive coordinator: Steve Croce (4th season)
- Co-offensive coordinator: Brett Banfield (3rd season)
- Defensive coordinator: Dan Mulrooney (4th season)
- Home stadium: Caparso Field

The 2020 Anna Maria Amcats football team was supposed to represent Anna Maria College of Paxton, Massachusetts. In what was going to be the fourth year under head coach Dan Mulrooney, Anna Maria cancelled their nine-game slate due to COVID-19.

=== Schedule ===
Date	Time	Opponent	Site	Result
September 4	7:00 p.m.	Becker*	Paxton, MA; Caparso Field	
September 12		at Union (NY)*	Schenectady, NY; Frank Bailey Field	
September 19	12:00 p.m.	at Nichols*	Dudley, MA; Vendetti Field	
September 26	12:00 p.m.	RPI*	Paxton, MA; Caparso Field	
October 3	12:00 p.m.	Alfred State^{†}	Paxton, MA; Caparso Field	
October 10		at Dean	Franklin, MA; Dale Lippert Field	
October 17		at Maritime	Throggs Neck, NY; Reinhart Field	
October 24	12:00 p.m.	Keystone	Paxton, MA; Caparso Field	
November 14		at Castleton	Paxton, MA; Caparso Field	
*Non-conference game; ^{†}Homecoming

== 2021 ==
2021 Anna Maria Amcats football

ECFC co-champion

NCAA Division III First Round, L 10–62 at Delaware Valley
- Conference: Eastern Collegiate Football Conference
- Record: 7–3 (5–1 ECFC)
- Head coach: Dan Mulrooney (5th season)
- Offensive coordinator: Steve Croce (5th season)
- Defensive coordinator: Dan Mulrooney (5th season)
- Captains: Hayden Braga; Alex Cohen; Doug Jackson; Devin White
- Home stadium: Caparso Field

2021 Eastern Collegiate Football Conference standings
	Conf.			Overall
Team	W		L	W		L
Anna Maria +^	5	–	1	7	–	3
Alfred State +	5	–	1	6	–	5
Castleton	4	–	2	6	–	4
Gallaudet	3	–	3	5	–	3
Maritime	3	–	3	3	–	6
Dean	1	–	5	2	–	8
Keystone	0	–	6	0	–	10
+ – Conference co-champions; ^ – NCAA Division III playoff participant

The 2021 Anna Maria Amcats football team represented Anna Maria College of Paxton, Massachusetts. In its fifth and final year (fourth season) under head coach Dan Mulrooney, Anna Maria compiled an overall record of 7–3 as a member of the Eastern Collegiate Football Conference (ECFC) with a conference record of 5–1.

After leading Anna Maria to an overall record of 11–29, their first-ever winning season, first-ever conference championship, and first-ever playoff appearance, head coach Dan Mulrooney resigned to become the head coach for Lock Haven.

Head coach Dan Mulrooney was named ECFC Coach of the Year, while offensive coordinator and offensive line coach Steve Croce earned ECFC Assistant Coach of the Year. Wide receiver Deandre Wallace was selected as the ECFC Rookie of the Year and was also named First-team All-ECFC, along with defensive lineman Jude Sampson and defensive back Armstrong Antoine. Second-team All-ECFC selections included quarterback Alex Cohen, wide receiver Justin McMillian, offensive lineman Devin White, and defensive lineman Elijah Allston.

=== Schedule ===
Date	Time	Opponent	Site	Result	Attendance	Source
September 11	12:30 p.m.	Nichols*	Paxton, MA; Caparso Field	L 23–27	2,203	
September 18	1:00 p.m.	Massachusetts Maritime*	Paxton, MA; Caparso Field	W 23–13	602	
September 25	1:30 p.m.	at Coast Guard*	New London, CT; Cadet Memorial Stadium	W 29–24	2,651	
October 2	12:00 p.m.	at Keystone	La Plume, PA; Turf Field Complex	W 55–35		
October 16	12:00 p.m.	at Alfred State	Alfred, NY; Pioneer Stadium	W 28–17	832	
October 23	1:30 p.m.	Dean^{†}	Paxton, MA; Caparso Field	W 45–32	2,500	
October 30	2:00 p.m.	at Castleton	Castleton, VT; Dave Wolk Stadium	L 31–38	877	
November 6	12:00 p.m.	Gallaudet	Paxton, MA; Caparso Field	W 37–21	721	
November 13	1:00 p.m.	Maritime	Paxton, MA; Caparso Field	W 31–7	573	
November 20	12:00 p.m.	at Delaware Valley	Doylestown, PA; James Work Memorial Stadium (NCAA Division III First Round)	L 10–62	1,005	
*Non-conference game; ^{†}Homecoming

== 2022 ==
2022 Anna Maria Amcats football
- Conference: Eastern Collegiate Football Conference
- Record: 5–4 (3–3 ECFC)
- Head coach: Steve Croce (1st season)
- Offensive coordinator: Tanner Kingsley (1st season)
- Defensive coordinator: Nick Thayer (1st season)
- Captains: Armstrong Antoine; Hayden Braga; Alex Cohen
- Home stadium: Caparso Field

2022 Eastern Collegiate Football Conference standings
	Conf.			Overall
Team	W		L	W		L
Gallaudet $^	5	–	1	7	–	3
Castleton	4	–	2	5	–	5
Anna Maria	3	–	3	5	–	4
Alfred State	3	–	3	5	–	5
Keystone	3	–	3	3	–	7
Maritime	2	–	4	3	–	7
Dean	1	–	5	1	–	9
$ – Conference champion; ^ – NCAA Division III playoff participant

The 2022 Anna Maria Amcats football team represented Anna Maria College of Paxton, Massachusetts. In its first year under head coach Steve Croce, Anna Maria compiled an overall record of 5–4 as a member of the Eastern Collegiate Football Conference (ECFC) with a conference record of 3–3.

After six seasons on the staff, five as offensive coordinator, Steve Croce was promoted to head coach. Croce promoted quarterbacks coach Tanner Kingsley to replace him as offensive coordinator.

Wide receiver Devin Tolbert and offensive lineman Max Cyr were named First-team All-ECFC selections. Quarterback Alex Cohen, wide receiver Deandre Wallace, defensive linemen Terrence Jackson and Elijah Allston, linebackers Alvin Martin and Kyle Couto, and defensive back Lamar Wilkes earned Second-team All-ECFC honors.

=== Schedule ===
Date	Time	Opponent	Site	Result	Attendance	Source
September 10	12:00 p.m.	UMass Dartmouth*	Paxton, MA; Caparso Field	W 63–48	197	
September 17	1:00 p.m.	at Massachusetts Maritime*	Buzzards Bay, MA; Clean Harbors Stadium	W 23–14	3,012	
September 24	12:00 p.m.	Coast Guard*	Paxton, MA; Caparso Field	L 28–66		
October 1	1:30 p.m.	Alfred State^{†}	Paxton, MA; Caparso Field	L 25–30	257	
October 8	1:00 p.m.	at Maritime	Throggs Neck, NY; Reinhart Field	W 41–27	783	
October 15	12:00 p.m.	Keystone	Paxton, MA; Caparso Field	L 39–41	267	
October 29	12:00 p.m.	at Gallaudet	Washington, D.C.; Hotchkiss Field	L 13–27	451	
November 5	12:00 p.m.	at Dean	Franklin, MA; Dale Lippert Field	W 36–22	350	
November 12	2:00 p.m.	Castleton	Paxton, MA; Caparso Field	W 27–26 ^{(OT)}	542	
*Non-conference game; ^{†}Homecoming

== 2023 ==
2023 Anna Maria Amcats football

ECFC co-champion

New England Bowl, L 34–37 at Salve Regina
- Conference: Eastern Collegiate Football Conference
- Record: 5–5 (3–1 ECFC)
- Head coach: Steve Croce (2nd season)
- Offensive coordinator: Tanner Kingsley (2nd season)
- Defensive coordinator: Nick Thayer (2nd season)
- Home stadium: Caparso Field

2023 Eastern Collegiate Football Conference standings
	Conf.			Overall
Team	W		L	W		L
Alfred State +^	3	–	1	6	–	5
Anna Maria +	3	–	1	5	–	5
Gallaudet +	3	–	1	4	–	5
Dean	1	–	3	2	–	8
Castleton	0	–	4	2	–	7
+ – Conference co-champions; ^ – NCAA Division III playoff participant

The 2023 Anna Maria Amcats football team represented Anna Maria College of Paxton, Massachusetts. In its second year under head coach Steve Croce, Anna Maria compiled an overall record of 5–5 as a member of the Eastern Collegiate Football Conference (ECFC) with a conference record of 3–1.

Head coach Steve Croce was named ECFC Coach of the Year, while offensive coordinator and quarterbacks coach Tanner Kingsley earned ECFC Assistant Coach of the Year. Quarterback Ryan Russell was recognized as the ECFC Offensive Player of the Year, and offensive lineman Max Cyr was named ECFC Offensive Lineman of the Year. Kicker Ryan Kent received ECFC Special Teams Player of the Year honors.

Several Amcats were selected to the All-ECFC First Team, including quarterback Ryan Russell, running back Jamal Cariglia, wide receivers Deandre Wallace and Mark Johnson-Morgan, offensive linemen Max Cyr and Da'Shawn Allen, kicker Ryan Kent, defensive linemen Elijah Allston and Malik Kirnon, linebacker Antonio Giano, and defensive back Lamar Wilkes. Second-team All-ECFC selections included running back Justin Brown, tight end Tyler Bulinski, offensive lineman Timothy Northrup, linebacker Dilaver Ibrahimi, and defensive back Rashawn Shelton.

=== Schedule ===
Date	Time	Opponent	Site	Result	Attendance	Source
September 2	12:00 p.m.	Westfield State*	Paxton, MA; Caparso Field	W 51–26	368	
September 9	12:00 p.m.	at Coast Guard*	New London, CT; Cadet Memorial Field	L 24–93	724	
September 16	2:30 p.m.	Massachusetts Maritime*^{†}	Paxton, MA; Caparso Field	W 37–30	391	
September 23	3:30 p.m.	at Husson*	Bangor, ME; Winkin Athletic Conference	L 49–50	1,700	
October 7	1:00 p.m.	at Western New England	Springfield, MA; Golden Bear Stadium	L 17–33	1,250	
October 14	12:00 p.m.	at Alfred State	Alfred, NY; Pioneer Stadium	L 20–46	1,034	
October 21	12:00 p.m.	at Dean	Franklin, MA; Dale Lippert Field	W 52–20	847	
October 28	12:00 p.m.	Gallaudet	Paxton, MA; Caparso Field	W 49–14	342	
November 11	2:00 p.m.	Castleton	Paxton, MA; Caparso Field	W 58–23	679	
November 18	12:00 p.m.	at Salve Regina	Newport, RI; Toppa Field (New England Bowl)	L 34–37	683	
*Non-conference game; ^{†}Homecoming

== 2024 ==
2024 Anna Maria Amcats football

ECFC Championship Game, L 37–39 vs. Alfred State
- Conference: Eastern Collegiate Football Conference
- Record: 4–5 (2–1 ECFC)
- Head coach: Steve Croce (3rd season)
- Offensive coordinator: Tanner Kingsley (3rd season)
- Defensive coordinator: Hayden Braga (1st season)
- Captains: Tyler Bulinski; Max Cyr; Ryan Russell; Marino Vedova
- Home stadium: Caparso Field

2024 Eastern Collegiate Football Conference standings
	Conf.			Overall
Team	W		L	W		L
Alfred State y$^	2	–	1	5	–	6
Anna Maria y	2	–	1	4	–	5
Gallaudet	2	–	1	5	–	4
Dean	0	–	3	0	–	9
Championship: Alfred State 39, Anna Maria 37
$ – Conference champion; y – Championship game participant; ^ – NCAA Division III playoff participant

The 2024 Anna Maria Amcats football team represented Anna Maria College of Paxton, Massachusetts. In its third and final year under head coach Steve Croce, Anna Maria compiled an overall record of 4–5 as a member of the Eastern Collegiate Football Conference (ECFC) with a conference record of 2–1.

Midway through the season, Croce announced his intentions to retire. Croce ended his tenure with an overall record of 14–14 including one bowl game appearance. Associate head coach, offensive coordinator, and quarterbacks coach Tanner Kingsley was quickly promoted to head coach for the 2025 season.

Anna Maria's season ended with a 39–37 loss to Alfred State in the first, and final, ECFC Championship. The Amcats were led by quarterback Ryan Russell, the ECFC Offensive Player of the Year and a First-team All-ECFC selection, who threw for 2,777 yards and 27 touchdowns in his second season as a starter. Kicker Ryan Kent earned ECFC Special Teams Player of the Year honors, while defensive back Di'Angelo Jean Pierre was named co-Rookie of the Year. Several players received all-conference recognition: First-team All-ECFC selections included running back Jamal Cariglia, wide receivers Justin Oliver, Kevin Acosta Jr., and Davien Atkinson, offensive lineman Max Cyr, return specialist Justin Oliver, defensive lineman Jordan Martin, and defensive back Jihad Brown. Second-team All-ECFC honorees were running back Nico Cavaliere, wide receiver David Robinson, tight end Tyler Garretson, offensive linemen Timothy Northrup and Nathan Kern, defensive lineman Gabriel Mendez, and linebackers Kellen Palm and Jaiquan Torrence.

This was the final season as a member of the ECFC, as the three other teams were leaving the conference. Anna Maria was accepted as a full member of the Massachusetts State Collegiate Athletic Conference (MASCAC) starting in the 2025 season.

=== Schedule ===
Date	Time	Opponent	Site	Result	Attendance	Source
September 6	7:00 p.m.	at Westfield State*	Westfield, MA; Alumni Field	W 41–13	1,913	
September 14	12:00 p.m.	Coast Guard*	Paxton, MA; Caparso Field	L 45–52 ^{(OT)}	281	
September 21	1:00 p.m.	at Maritime*	Throggs Neck, NY; Reinhart Field	L 27–32	1,064	
September 28	1:30 p.m.	Husson*^{†}	Paxton, MA; Caparso Field	W 47–29	539	
October 5	7:00 p.m.	Western New England*	Paxton, MA; Caparso Field	L 10–44	425	
October 19	1:00 p.m.	at Gallaudet	Washington, D.C.; Hotchkiss Field	L 34–39	1,527	
October 26	12:00 p.m.	Alfred State	Paxton, MA; Caparso Field	W 35–23	375	
November 2	12:00 p.m.	Dean	Paxton, MA; Caparso Field	W 63–0	330	
November 16	12:00 p.m.	Alfred State*	Paxton, MA; Caparso Field (ECFC Championship)	L 37–39	1,200	
*Non-conference game; ^{†}Homecoming

== 2025 ==
2025 Anna Maria Amcats football

MASCAC co-champion
- Conference: Massachusetts State Collegiate Athletic Conference
- Record: 7–3 (7–2 MASCAC)
- Head coach: Tanner Kingsley (1st season)
- Offensive coordinator: Tanner Kingsley (4th season)
- Co-offensive coordinator: Richard Conrad (6th season)
- Defensive coordinator: Hayden Braga (2nd season)
- Home stadium: Caparso Field

2025 Massachusetts State Collegiate Athletic Conference football standings
	Conf.			Overall
Team	W		L	W		L
Plymouth State +	7	–	2	8	–	2
Anna Maria +	7	–	2	7	–	3
Framingham State +^	7	–	2	7	–	4
UMass Dartmouth	6	–	3	6	–	4
Bridgewater State	5	–	4	5	–	5
Massachusetts Maritime	5	–	4	5	–	5
Westfield State	3	–	6	3	–	7
Worcester State	3	–	6	3	–	7
Fitchburg State	2	–	7	3	–	7
Dean	0	–	9	0	–	10
+ – Conference co-champions; ^ – NCAA Division III playoff participant

The 2025 Anna Maria Amcats football team represented Anna Maria College of Paxton, Massachusetts. In its first year under head coach Tanner Kingsley, Anna Maria competed as a member of the Massachusetts State Collegiate Athletic Conference (MASCAC).

This was the school's first season as a member of the Massachusetts State Collegiate Athletic Conference (MASCAC) before closing in May 2026.

=== Schedule ===
Date	Time	Opponent	Site	Result	Attendance	Source
August 28	7:00 p.m.	at Nichols*	Dudley, MA; Dudley Field	(scrimmage)		
September 6	12:00 p.m.	at Eastern*	Radnor, PA; Football Facility at Valley Forge	L 7–46	1,775	
September 13	12:00 p.m.	Framingham State	Paxton, MA; Caparso Field	L 25–31	950	
September 20	1:00 p.m.	at Massachusetts Maritime	Buzzards Bay, MA; Clean Harbor Stadium	W 33–27 ^{OT}		
September 27	1:30 p.m.	UMass Dartmouth^{†}	Paxton, MA; Caparso Field	W 47–43	1,000	
October 4	2:00 p.m.	at Westfield State	Westfield, MA; Alumni Field	W 41–14	1,000	
October 18	12:00 p.m.	Plymouth State	Plymouth, NH; Currier Field	W 35–28	2,148	
October 25	12:00 p.m.	Fitchburg State	Paxton, MA; Caparso Field	W 30–22	1,150	
November 1	1:30 p.m.	at Worcester State	Worcester, MA; John F. Coughlin Field	W 45–35	1,345	
November 8	4:00 p.m.	at Bridgewater State	Bridgewater, MA; Swenson Field	L 35–41 ^{OT}	1,325	
November 15	12:00 p.m.	Dean	Paxton, MA; Caparso Field	W 62–15		
*Non-conference game; ^{†}Homecoming
