= Marc Klaiman =

American football coach (born 1965 or 1966)

Biographical details
- Born: c. 1965 or 1966 (age 60–61)
- Education: Nichols College (1988)

Playing career
- 1984–1987: Nichols
- Position: Offensive lineman

Coaching career (HC unless noted)
- 1988–1989: American International (GA)
- 1990: American International (ST/LB)
- 1991: Coast Guard (DE)
- 1992: Norwich (assistant)
- 1993–2003: Norwich (DC)
- 2004–2006: Bryant (AHC/DC)
- 2007: Merrimack (assoc. HC/DC)
- 2008–2011: Anna Maria
- 2012: Bryant (assistant)
- 2014: Tufts (DL)

Head coaching record
- Overall: 2–27

Marc Klaiman (born c. 1965 or 1966) is an American former college football coach. He was the head football coach for Anna Maria College from 2008 to 2011. He was an assistant coach for American International, Coast Guard, Norwich, Bryant, and Tufts. He played college football for Nichols as an offensive lineman.

== Head coaching record ==
| Year | Team | Overall | Conference | Standing | Bowl/playoffs |
|---|---|---|---|---|---|
Anna Maria Amcats (NCAA Division III independent) (2009)
| 2009 | Anna Maria | 0–9 | | | |
Anna Maria Amcats (Eastern Collegiate Football Conference) (2010–2011)
| 2010 | Anna Maria | 0–10 | 0–7 | 8th | |
| 2011 | Anna Maria | 2–8 | 2–5 | 6th | |
| Anna Maria: | | 2–27 | 2–12 | | |
| Total: | | 2–27 | | | |
