= Dan Mulrooney =

American football coach (born 1988)

Current position
- Title: Defensive coordinator
- Team: Brown
- Conference: Ivy League

Biographical details
- Born: December 27, 1988 (age 37); Prospect, Connecticut, U.S.
- Education: Boston College (2011); Stony Brook University (2013)

Playing career
- 2008–2010: Boston College
- 2011–2012: Stony Brook
- Positions: Free safety, linebacker

Coaching career (HC unless noted)
- 2013–2016: WPI (DC)
- 2017–2021: Anna Maria
- 2022–2024: Lock Haven
- 2025–present: Brown (DC)

Head coaching record
- Overall: 22–50
- Tournaments: 0–1 (NCAA D-III playoffs)

Accomplishments and honors

Championships
- 1 ECFC (2021)

Awards
- ECFC Coach of the Year (2021)

Daniel Vincent Mulrooney (born December 28, 1988) is an American college football coach. He is the defensive coordinator for Brown University, a position he has held since 2025. He was the head coach for Anna Maria College from 2016 to 2021 and Lock Haven University of Pennsylvania from 2022 to 2024. He also coached for WPI. He played college football for Boston College and Stony Brook as a linebacker and free safety.

== Head coaching record ==
| Year | Team | Overall | Conference | Standing | Bowl/playoffs |
|---|---|---|---|---|---|
Anna Maria Amcats (Eastern Collegiate Football Conference) (2017–2021)
| 2017 | Anna Maria | 1–9 | 1–6 | T–7th | |
| 2018 | Anna Maria | 1–9 | 1–5 | T–5th | |
| 2019 | Anna Maria | 2–8 | 2–3 | T–3rd | |
| 2020–21 | No team—COVID-19 | | | | |
| 2021 | Anna Maria | 7–3 | 5–1 | T–1st | L NCAA Division III First Round |
| Anna Maria: | | 11–29 | 9–15 | | |
Lock Haven Bald Eagles (Pennsylvania State Athletic Conference) (2022–2024)
| 2022 | Lock Haven | 1–10 | 0–7 | 8th (East) | |
| 2023 | Lock Haven | 5–5 | 3–4 | T–4th (East) | |
| 2024 | Lock Haven | 5–6 | 3–4 | T–5th (East) | |
| Lock Haven: | | 11–21 | 6–15 | | |
| Total: | | 22–50 | | | |
National championship Conference title Conference division title or championship game berth
