= 2010 Maritime Privateers football team =

American college football season

2010 Maritime Privateers football

ECFC champion

NCAA Division III First Round, L 0–60 at Alfred
- Conference: Eastern Collegiate Football Conference
- Record: 10–1 (7–0 ECFC)
- Head coach: Clayton Kendrick-Holmes (5th season)
- Defensive coordinator: Vincent DiGaetano (3rd season)
- Home stadium: Reinhart Field

2010 Eastern Collegiate Football Conference standings
| | Conf. | | | Overall |
| Team | W | | L | W | | L |
|---|---|---|---|---|---|---|
| Maritime $^ | 7 | – | 0 | 10 | – | 1 |
| Norwich | 5 | – | 2 | 8 | – | 3 |
| Castleton | 5 | – | 2 | 5 | – | 4 |
| Mount Ida | 5 | – | 2 | 6 | – | 5 |
| Gallaudet | 3 | – | 4 | 3 | – | 5 |
| Becker | 2 | – | 5 | 2 | – | 8 |
| Husson | 1 | – | 6 | 1 | – | 9 |
| Anna Maria | 0 | – | 7 | 0 | – | 10 |
$ – Conference champion; ^ – NCAA Division III playoff participant

The 2010 Maritime Privateers football team represented State University of New York Maritime College as a member of the Eastern Collegiate Football Conference (ECFC) during the 2010 NCAA Division III football season. Led by fifth-year head coach Clayton Kendrick-Holmes, the Privateers compiled an overall record of 10–1 with a mark of 7–0 in conference play, winning the ECFC title. Maritime earned an automatic berth to the NCAA Division III Football Championship playoffs, where the Privateers lost in the first round to Alfred. The team played home games at Reinhart Field in the Throggs Neck neighborhood of The Bronx.

== Schedule ==
| Date | Time | Opponent | Site | Result | Attendance | Source |
|---|---|---|---|---|---|---|
| September 2 | 7:00 p.m. | Massachusetts Maritime* | Reinhart Field; Bronx, NY (Chowder Bowl) | W 15–12 | 4,000 | |
| September 10 | 7:00 p.m. | at Western Connecticut* | Westside Athletic Complex; Danbury, CT | W 41–28 | 2,107 | |
| September 18 | 1:00 p.m. | Merchant Marine* | Reinhart Field; Bronx, NY | W 41–34 | 4,250 | |
| September 25 | 1:00 p.m. | Husson^{†} | Reinhart Field; Bronx, NY | W 47–21 | 4,500 | |
| October 2 | 2:00 p.m. | at Anna Maria | AMCAT Field; Paxton, MA | W 43–20 | 412 | |
| October 9 | 12:00 p.m. | at Castleton | Spartan Stadium; Castleton, VT | W 41–28 | 2,212 | |
| October 16 | 2:00 p.m. | Becker | Reinhart Field; Bronx, NY | W 23–0 | 1,500 | |
| October 23 | 1:00 p.m. | at Mount Ida | Mount Ida Athletic Stadium; Newton, MA | W 37–35 | 1,000 | |
| October 30 | 1:00 p.m. | Norwich | Reinhart Field; Bronx, NY | W 20–2 | 2,500 | |
| November 6 | 7:00 p.m. | at Gallaudet | Hotchkiss Field; Washington, DC | W 15–12 | 800 | |
| November 20 | 12:00 p.m. | at Alfred* | Merrill Field; Alfred, NY (NCAA Division III First Round) | L 0–60 | 2,008 | |
*Non-conference game; ^{†}Homecoming; All times are in Eastern time
