= Clayton Kendrick-Holmes =

American football coach

Current position
- Title: Associate assistant director for football—chief of staff
- Team: Army
- Conference: AAC

Biographical details
- Born: c. 1970 (age 55–56)

Playing career
- 1990–1991: Navy
- Position: Linebacker

Coaching career (HC unless noted)
- 1992: NAPS (RI) (assistant)
- 1996–1998: NAPS (RI) (assistant)
- 2002: NAPS (RI) (assistant)
- 2003–2004: NAPS (RI)
- 2006–2017: Maritime

Administrative career (AD unless noted)
- 2018–present: Army (assoc. AD for football)

Head coaching record
- Overall: 63–55 (college); 14–6 (high school)
- Bowls: 0–2
- Tournaments: 0–1 (NCAA D-III playoffs)

Accomplishments and honors

Championships
- 1 ECFC (2010)

Awards
- ECFC Coach of the Year (2010)

Clayton Kendrick-Holmes (born c. 1970) is an American college football coach and former United States Navy officer. He is the associate athletic director for football—chief of staff at the United States Military Academy (USMA), a position he has held since 2018. Kendrick-Holmes served as the head football coach at the State University of New York Maritime College from 2006 to 2017, compiling a record of 63–55. Kendrick-Holmes attended the United States Naval Academy (USNA), where he played football for the Navy Midshipmen as a linebacker.

After leading Maritime to a program-record 10–1 season, guiding the team to its first-ever conference championship, and first-ever playoff appearance, Kendrick-Holmes was named Eastern Collegiate Football Conference (ECFC) Coach of the Year. Alongside him, six of his players were also given All-ECFC honors.

== Head coaching record ==
=== College ===
Year	Team	Overall	Conference	Standing	Bowl/playoffs
Maritime Privateers (NCAA Division III independent) (2006–2008)
2006	Maritime	1–6			
2007	Maritime	2–8			
2008	Maritime	4–5			
Maritime Privateers (Eastern Collegiate Football Conference) (2009–2017)
2009	Maritime	6–4	3–3	T–4th	
2010	Maritime	10–1	6–1	1st	L NCAA Division III First Round
2011	Maritime	8–2	6–1	2nd	
2012	Maritime	3–6	2–4	5th	
2013	Maritime	5–5	5–2	3rd	
2014	Maritime	4–6	3–4	5th	
2015	Maritime	5–5	3–4	5th	
2016	Maritime	6–5	4–3	T–3rd	L ECAC Whitelaw
2017	Maritime	9–2	6–1	2nd	L New England
Maritime:		63–55	37–23		
Total:		63–55			
