= Steve Croce =

American football coach (born c. 1965–1966)

Biographical details
- Born: c. 1965 or 1966 (age 60–61); Naugatuck, Connecticut, U.S.

Playing career
- Position: Tight end

Coaching career (HC unless noted)
- 1989–2007: Holy Cross HS (CT) (OC)
- 2008–2011: Pomperaug HS (CT) (OC)
- 2012–2013: Post (OC)
- 2014: Cheshire HS (CT) (OC)
- 2015: Coginchaug Regional HS (CT)
- 2016: Anna Maria (QB)
- 2017: Anna Maria (OC/QB)
- 2018: Anna Maria (OC/OL)
- 2019–2021: Anna Maria (OC/RB)
- 2022–2024: Anna Maria

Head coaching record
- Overall: 14–14 (college); 4–6 (high school)
- Bowls: 0–1

Accomplishments and honors

Championships
- 1 ECFC (2023)

Awards
- ECFC Coach of the Year (2023); ECFC Assistant Coach of the Year (2021)

Steven M. Croce (born c. 1965 or 1966) is an American former college football coach. He was the head football coach for Coginchaug Regional High School in 2015 and Anna Maria College from 2022 to 2024. He previously coached for Holy Cross High School, Pomperaug High School, Post, and Cheshire High School.

== Head coaching record ==
=== College ===
Year	Team	Overall	Conference	Standing	Bowl/playoffs
Anna Maria Amcats (Eastern Collegiate Football Conference) (2022–2024)
2022	Anna Maria	5–4	3–3	T–3rd	
2023	Anna Maria	5–5	3–1	T–1st	L New England
2024	Anna Maria	4–5	2–1	T–1st	L ECFC Championship
Anna Maria:		14–14	8–5		
Total:		14–14			
National championship Conference title Conference division title or championship game berth

=== High school ===
Year	Team	Overall	Conference	Standing	Bowl/playoffs
Coginchaug Regional Blue Devils (Pequot) (2015)
2015	Coginchaug Regional	4–6	2–3	4th	
Coginchaug Regional:		4–6	2–3		
Total:		4–6			
