= Mickey Rehring =

American football coach (born c. 1986)

Current position
- Title: Defensive coordinator & safeties coach
- Team: King's (PA)
- Conference: MAC

Biographical details
- Born: c. 1986 (age 39–40)
- Education: Franklin & Marshall College (2008)

Playing career
- 2004–2007: Franklin & Marshall
- Position: Defensive lineman

Coaching career (HC unless noted)
- 2008: Franklin & Marshall (DL)
- 2009: Bowdoin (DL)
- 2010–2011: Bowdoin (ST/DL)
- 2012: Johns Hopkins (ST/LB)
- 2013–2018: Johns Hopkins (DC/LB)
- 2019–2023: Maritime
- 2024: King's (PA) (DC/LB)
- 2025–present: King's (PA) (DC/S)

Administrative career (AD unless noted)
- 2019–2023: Maritime (assistant AD)

Head coaching record
- Overall: 16–24
- Tournaments: 0–1 (NCAA D-III playoffs)

Accomplishments and honors

Awards
- As player Second-Team All-Centennial (2005); As coach AFCA Assistant Coach of the Year Award (2018)

Mickey Rehring (born c. 1986) is an American college football coach. He is the defensive coordinator and safeties coach for King's College, positions he has held since 2025. He was the head football coach for the State University of New York Maritime College from 2019 to 2023. He also coached for Franklin & Marshall, Bowdoin, and Johns Hopkins. He played college football for Franklin & Marshall as a defensive lineman.

== Early life and playing career ==
Rehring was born around 1986. He attended State College Area High School. He played college football for Franklin & Marshall as a defensive lineman. In 2005, he earned Second Team All-Centennial honors.

== Coaching career ==
In 2008, Rehring began his playing career with his alma mater, Franklin & Marshall, following his graduation. He served as the defensive line coach under head coach John Troxell.

In 2009, Rehring was hired by Bowdoin to be the defensive line coach under head coach Dave Caputi. He added the role of special teams coordinator in 2010. He maintained those positions until 2011.

In 2012, Rehring was hired by Johns Hopkins as the special teams coordinator and linebackers coach under head coach Jim Margraff. In 2013, after one season in those roles he was promoted to defensive coordinator. In 2018, Rehring was named as the NCAA Division III's AFCA Assistant Coach of the Year.

On February 25, 2019, Rehring was named the head football coach for the State University of New York Maritime College. In his first game with the team, he helped lead the team over Maine Maritime in a 24–21 win. The following week, Maritime loss their first Chowder Bowl against rival Massachusetts Maritime 14–31. They also won their homecoming game against Castleton 21–3. In his inaugural season he led the team to a 5–6 record and finished second in the Eastern Collegiate Football Conference (ECFC). Due to Dean in the process of transitioning to the Division III level, Maritime was selected as the ECFC's qualifier for the playoffs. They faced Salisbury in the first round of the playoffs and lost 83–0.

In 2020, Maritime elected not to participate in the delayed 2020–21 season due to COVID-19. In 2021, he led the team to a 3–6 overall record and 3–3 in the ECFC which was good enough for tied-fourth. He lost his second-straight Chowder Bowl 6–14 and also lost on homecoming 9–23 against conference opponent Gallaudet.

In 2022, Maritime went 3–7 and 2–4 in conference play which finished in sixth place. After losing against Hartwick 31–10 he led the Privateers to their first 17–14 win over Massachusetts Maritime in Rehring's tenure. They also won their homecoming game against Dean 30–19.

In 2023, Maritime went 5–5 and 3–4 in New England Women's and Men's Athletic (NEWMAC) play which finished in tied-fourth place. The Privateers won their first two games of the season against Hartwick and in the Chowder Bowl against Massachusetts Maritime. They beat Coast Guard 24–21 on homecoming before losing the final two games of the season to Salve Regina 49–0 and Springfield 51–6. He resigned following the 2023 season.

In 2024, Rehring was hired as the defensive coordinator and linebackers coach for King's (PA) under first-year head coach Mike Cebrosky.

== Head coaching record ==
| Year | Team | Overall | Conference | Standing | Bowl/playoffs |
|---|---|---|---|---|---|
Maritime Privateers (Eastern Collegiate Football Conference) (2019–2022)
| 2019 | Maritime | 5–6 | 3–2 | 2nd | L NCAA Division First Round |
| 2020–21 | No team | | | | |
| 2021 | Maritime | 3–6 | 3–3 | T–4th | |
| 2022 | Maritime | 3–7 | 2–4 | 6th | |
Maritime Privateers (New England Women's and Men's Athletic Conference) (2023)
| 2023 | Maritime | 5–5 | 3–4 | T–4th | |
| Maritime: | | 16–24 | 11–13 | | |
| Total: | | 16–24 | | | |
