= Vince Sinagra =

American football coach (born c. 1952)

Current position
- Title: Chief of staff
- Team: Rhode Island
- Conference: CAA

Biographical details
- Born: c. 1952 (age 73–74); Brooklyn, New York, U.S.
- Education: University of Rhode Island (1975, 1983)

Playing career
- 1971–1974: Rhode Island
- 1975: Philadelphia Bell*
- 1975: Toronto Argonauts*
- Position: Defensive tackle

Coaching career (HC unless noted)
- 1976–1977: Rhode Island (DL)
- 1978–1981: Milford HS (CT)
- 1988–1993: Bloomsburg (DC)
- 1993: Hofstra (WR)
- 1994–1997: Fordham (DC)
- 1998: Hofstra (DC)
- 1999–2003: Holy Cross (LB/ST)
- 2004–2005: Stony Brook (DC)
- 2006–2007: VMI (DC/LB)
- 2008–2009: Norfolk State (LB)
- 2010–2011: Anna Maria (DC)
- 2012–2016: Anna Maria

Administrative career (AD unless noted)
- 1981–1987: Milford HS (CT)
- 2017–2018: Temple (chief of staff)
- 2019–2021: Georgia Tech (chief of staff)
- 2022–present: Rhode Island (chief of staff)

Head coaching record
- Overall: 6–44

Vincent Sinagra (born c. 1952) is an American football coach. He is the chief of staff for the Rhode Island Rams football team; a position he has held since 2022. He previously was the chief of staff for Temple and Georgia Tech and was the athletic director for Milford Academy. He was the head coach for the Anna Maria Amcats football team from 2012 to 2016. He also coached for Rhode Island, Milford Academy, Hofstra, Fordham, Holy Cross, Stony Brook, VMI, and Norfolk State. He played college football for Rhode Island as a defensive tackle and professionally for the Philadelphia Bell of the World Football League (WFL) and the Toronto Argonauts of the Canadian Football League (CFL).

== Head coaching record ==
Year	Team	Overall	Conference	Standing	Bowl/playoffs
Anna Maria Amcats (Eastern Collegiate Football Conference) (2012–2016)
2012	Anna Maria	2–8	1–6	T–7th	
2013	Anna Maria	2–8	1–6	7th	
2014	Anna Maria	0–10	0–7	8th	
2015	Anna Maria	1–9	1–6	7th	
2016	Anna Maria	1–9	1–6	T–7th	
Anna Maria:		6–44	4–31		
Total:		6–44			
