= Robert Frey =

Robert Frey or Bob Frey may refer to:

- Robert G. Frey (born 1938 or 1939), Kansas state legislator
- Robert J. Frey, banker and researcher in quantitative finance
- Bob Frey (born 1950), American racing driver
- Bob Frey (American football) (fl. 1981-2015), American football coach and former player
