= Jamel Ramsay =

American football coach (born c. 1985)

Current position
- Title: Athletic director
- Team: Maritime
- Conference: NEWMAC

Biographical details
- Born: c. 1986 (age 39–40); Elmont, New York, U.S.
- Education: C. W. Post (2008); Lock Haven University (2016)

Playing career

Football
- 2004–2007: C. W. Post
- 2008: Peoria Pirates
- 2009: Albany Firebirds
- Positions: Wide receiver, cornerback

Coaching career (HC unless noted)

Football
- 2008–2010: C. W. Post (WR)
- 2011–2015: Schreiber HS (NY)
- 2016: LIU Post (WR)
- 2017–2023: Nassau
- 2024: Maritime

Basketball
- 2014: Shreiber HS (NY) (assistant)

Administrative career (AD unless noted)
- 2025–present: Maritime

Head coaching record
- Overall: 8–3 (college); 37–23 (junior college); 17–22 (high school)
- Bowls: 1–1 (NJCAA); 1–0 (NCAA D-III)
- Tournaments: 0–1 (NJCAA D-III playoffs)

Jamel Ramsay (born c. 1986) is an American college football coach and athletic director. He was the athletic director for the State University of New York Maritime College, from 2025 to July, 2026. He was the head football coach for Paul D. Schreiber Senior High School from 2011 to 2015 and Nassau Community College from 2017 to 2023.

== Playing career ==
Ramsay grew up in Elmont, New York, and attended Sewanhaka High School. He played college football for C. W. Post as a cornerback and wide receiver. In 2008, he signed with the Peoria Pirates of the AF2. In 2009, he played for the Albany Firebirds of the AF2.

== Coaching career ==
In 2008, Ramsay was hired as the wide receivers coach for his alma mater, C. W. Post. In 2011, he was hired as the head football coach for Paul D. Schreiber Senior High School. In five years with the team he led them to a 17–22 record and back-to-back seven win seasons in 2012 and 2013. In 2012, after consecutive 0–8 seasons, the Vikings finished 7–1 and won the Nassau Division V title, the program's first division championship in more than 30 years, defeating Jericho 26–20 in the championship game. In 2016, he rejoined C. W. Post, which was now LIU Post, as the wide receivers coach. After one season he was named head football coach for Nassau Community College. In six seasons (the 2020 season was cancelled due to COVID-19) he led the team to a 37–23 record. In 2021, Ramsay led the team to the NJCAA Division III National Championship which they lost. In 2024, he was hired as the head football coach for Maritime following the resignation of Mickey Rehring.

In 2014, Ramsay also served as an assistant coach for the Schreiber High School's basketball team.

== Head coaching record ==
=== College ===
Year	Team	Overall	Conference	Standing	Bowl/playoffs
Maritime Privateers (New England Women's and Men's Athletic Conference) (2024)
2024	Maritime	8–3	5–2	T–2nd	W Fusion Bowl
Maritime:		8–3	5–2		
Total:		8–3			

=== Junior college ===
Year	Team	Overall	Conference	Standing	Bowl/playoffs	D3^{#}
Nassau Lions (NJCAA independent) (2017–2023)
2017	Nassau	5–4				
2018	Nassau	8–3			W Red Grange	20
2019	Nassau	7–4			L Graphic Edge	
2020–21	No team—COVID-19					
Nassau Lions (NJCAA Division III independent) (2021–present)
2021	Nassau	6–3			L Red Grange	2
2022	Nassau	6–4				5
2023	Nassau	5–5				5
Nassau:		37–23				
Total:		37–23				

=== High school ===
Year	Team	Overall	Conference	Standing	Bowl/playoffs
Schreiber Vikings () (2011–2015)
2011	Schreiber	0–8	0–7	14th	
2012	Schreiber	7–1	6–1	1st	Win Division V Championship
2013	Schreiber	7–1	7–1	2nd	
2014	Schreiber	2–5	2–5	10th	
2015	Schreiber	1–7	1–7		
Schreiber:		17–22	16–21		
Total:		17–22			
