= Anna Maria Amcats football =

College football team

2025 Anna Maria Amcats football team
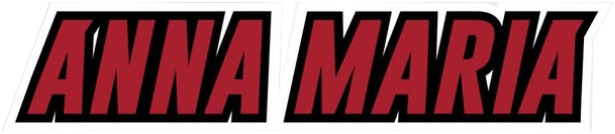
- First season: 2009; 17 years ago
- Last season: 2025; 1 year ago
- Athletic director: Joseph Brady
- Head coach: Tanner Kingsley; 1st season, 7–3 (.700)
- Location: Paxton, Massachusetts
- Stadium: Caparso Field (capacity: 1,000)
- NCAA division: Division III
- Conference: MASCAC
- Colors: Cardinal and white
- All-time record: 40–117 (.255)
- Bowl record: 0–1 (.000)

Conference championships
- 2 (2021, 2023, 2025)
- Mascot: MAC the AMCAT
- Website: goamcats.com

The Anna Maria Amcats football team represented Anna Maria College in college football at the NCAA Division III level. The Amcats were members of the Massachusetts State Collegiate Athletic Conference (MASCAC), fielding team in the MASCAC in 2025. The Amcats played their home games at Caparso Field in Paxton, Massachusetts.

Their last head coach was Tanner Kingsley, who took over the position for the 2025 season.

== Conference affiliations ==
- Eastern Collegiate Football Conference (2009–2024)
- Massachusetts State Collegiate Athletic Conference (2025)

== Championships ==
=== Conference championships ===
Anna Maria claimed 2 conference titles, the most recent of which came in 2023.

Year	Conference	Overall Record	Conference Record	Coach
2021†	Eastern Collegiate Football Conference	7–3	5–1	Dan Mulrooney
2023†	Eastern Collegiate Football Conference	5–5	3–1	Steve Croce

† Co-champions

== Postseason games ==
=== NCAA Division III playoff games ===
Anna Maria appeared in the Division III playoffs one time, with an overall record of 0–1.

Year	Round	Opponent	Result
2021	First Round	Delaware Valley	L, 10–62

=== Bowl games ===
Anna Maria participated in one bowl game, and has a record of 0–1.

Season	Coach	Bowl	Opponent	Result
2023	Steve Croce	New England Bowl	Salve Regina	L 34–37

== List of head coaches ==
=== Key ===
Key to symbols in coaches list
General		Overall		Conference		Postseason (Note: Although the first Rose Bowl Game was played in 1902, it has been continuously played since the 1916 game, and is recognized as the oldest bowl game by the NCAA. "—" indicates any season prior to 1916 when postseason games were not played.)	
No.	Order of coaches (Note: A running total of the number of head coaches, with coaches who served separate tenures being counted only once. Interim head coaches are represented with "Int" and are not counted in the running total. "—" indicates the team played but either without a coach or no coach is on record. "X" indicates an interim year without play.)	GC	Games coached	CW	Conference wins	PW	Postseason wins
DC	Division championships	OW	Overall wins	CL	Conference losses	PL	Postseason losses
CC	Conference championships	OL	Overall losses	CT	Conference ties	PT	Postseason ties
NC	National championships	OT	Overall ties (Note: Overtime rules in college football were introduced in 1996, making ties impossible in the period since.)	C%	Conference winning percentage		
†	Elected to the College Football Hall of Fame	O%	Overall winning percentage (Note: When computing the win–loss percentage, a tie counts as half a win and half a loss.)				

=== Coaches ===
List of head football coaches showing season(s) coached, overall records, conference records, postseason records, and championships
No.	Name	Season(s)	GC	OW	OL	O%	CW	CL	C%	PW	PL	CC
1	Marc Klaiman	2009–2011	29	2	27	0.065	2	12	0.143	0	0	0
2	Vince Sinagra	2012–2016	50	6	44	0.120	4	31	0.114	0	0	0
3	Dan Mulrooney	2017–2021	37	11	29	0.275	9	15	0.375	0	1	1
4	Steve Croce	2022–2024	28	14	14	0.500	8	5	0.615	0	0	0
5	Tanner Kingsley	2025	10	7	3	0.700	7	2	0.778	0	0	1

== Year-by-year results ==
National champions	Conference champions	Bowl game berth	Playoff berth

Season	Year	Head coach	Association	Division	Conference	Record							Postseason	Final ranking
Season	Year	Head coach	Association	Division	Conference	Overall			Conference				Postseason	Final ranking
Season	Year	Head coach	Association	Division	Conference	Win	Loss	Tie	Finish	Win	Loss	Tie	Postseason	Final ranking
Anna Maria Amcats
2009	2009	Marc Klaiman	NCAA	Division III	ECFC	0	9	0	N/A	0	0	0	—	—
2010	2010	Marc Klaiman	NCAA	Division III	ECFC	0	10	0	8th	0	7	0	—	—
2011	2011	Marc Klaiman	NCAA	Division III	ECFC	2	8	0	6th	2	5	0	—	—
2012	2012	Vince Sinagra	NCAA	Division III	ECFC	2	8	0	T–7th	1	6	0	—	—
2013	2013	Vince Sinagra	NCAA	Division III	ECFC	2	8	0	7th	1	6	0	—	—
2014	2014	Vince Sinagra	NCAA	Division III	ECFC	0	10	0	8th	0	7	0	—	—
2015	2015	Vince Sinagra	NCAA	Division III	ECFC	1	9	0	7th	1	6	0	—	—
2016	2016	Vince Sinagra	NCAA	Division III	ECFC	1	9	0	T–7th	1	6	0	—	—
2017	2017	Dan Mulrooney	NCAA	Division III	ECFC	1	9	0	T–7th	1	6	0	—	—
2018	2018	Dan Mulrooney	NCAA	Division III	ECFC	1	9	0	T–5th	1	5	0	—	—
2019	2019	Dan Mulrooney	NCAA	Division III	ECFC	2	8	0	T–3rd	2	3	0	—	—
Season canceled due to COVID-19
2021	2021	Dan Mulrooney	NCAA	Division III	ECFC	7	3	0	T–1st	5	1	0	L Division III First Round	—
2022	2022	Steve Croce	NCAA	Division III	ECFC	5	4	0	T–3rd	3	3	0	—	—
2023	2023	Steve Croce	NCAA	Division III	ECFC	5	5	0	T–1st	3	1	0	L New England Bowl	—
2024	2024	Steve Croce	NCAA	Division III	ECFC	4	5	0	T–1st	2	1	0	L ECFC Championship	—
2025	2025	Tanner Kingsley	NCAA	Division III	MASCAC	7	3	0	T–1st	7	2	0	—	—

== See also ==
- Anna Maria Amcats
