= Maritime Privateers =

- University: SUNY Maritime College
- Nickname: Privateers
- NCAA: Division III
- Conference: Skyline; ECFC (football leaving in 2022); NEWMAC (football joining in 2023); ICSA (sailing); US Rowing (rowing)
- Athletic director: Jamel Ramsey
- Location: Throggs Neck, New York
- Varsity teams: 16 (8 men's, 6 women's, 2 co-ed)
- Football stadium: Reinhart Field (also Men's & Women's Soccer, and Men's & Women's Lacrosse)
- Basketball arena: Riesenberg Hall Gymnasium (men's basketball and women's volleyball)
- Baseball stadium: Reinhart Baseball Field
- Aquatics center: Riesenberg Hall Aquatic Center
- Colors: Navy and Cardinal
- Mascot: Privateer Pete
- Website: www.maritimeathletics.com
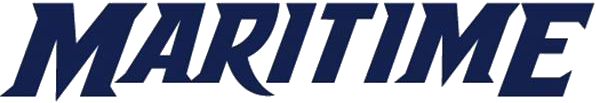

The Maritime Privateers are an intercollegiate athletic program in the National Collegiate Athletic Association (NCAA) Division III representing the State University of New York Maritime College (SUNY Maritime College). The Maritime Privateers compete primarily in the Skyline Conference for the majority of its sports, as well as the New England Women's and Men's Athletic Conference (NEWMAC) for football, Intercollegiate Sailing Association (ICSA) for sailing, and US Rowing for its rowing teams. The Maritime Privateers compete in 16 NCAA Division III varsity sports (8 men's, 6 women's, and 2 co-ed).

The Maritime Privateers currently sponsors 16 different varsity programs: baseball, men's basketball, men's and women's cross country, football, men's and women's lacrosse, men's and women's rowing, co-ed dinghy sailing, co-ed offshore sailing, men's and women's soccer, men's and women's swimming & diving, and women's volleyball. The Maritime Privateers also offers ice hockey, mixed rifle and rugby at the club level. Ice hockey competes as a Division III member of the American Collegiate Hockey Association, mixed rifle competes in the Mid-Atlantic Rifle Conference, and rugby competes in the Tri-State Rugby Conference.

== Varsity teams ==
Men's sports	Women's sports
Baseball	Cross country
Basketball	Lacrosse
Cross country	Rowing
Football	Soccer
Lacrosse	Swimming
Rowing	Volleyball
Soccer	
Swimming	
Co-ed sports
Sailing
