= Alfred Saxons football =

Football team of Alfred University

- First season: 1895; 131 years ago
- Athletic director: Deb Stewart
- Head coach: Bob Rankl; 12th season, 68–51 (.571)
- Location: Alfred, New York
- Stadium: Yunevich Stadium (capacity: 3,000)
- Field: Merrill Field
- NCAA division: Division III
- Conference: Empire 8
- Colors: Purple and gold
- All-time record: 560–421–45 (.568)

Conference championships
- 9 (1970, 1971, 1972, 1981, 1989, 2009, 2010, 2016, 2020)
- Consensus All-Americans: 84
- Mascot: Saxon
- Website: gosaxons.com

The Alfred Saxons football program represents Alfred University in college football. The team competes as the NCAA Division III level as a member of the Empire 8 conference. The Saxons play home games at the 3,000-seat Merril Field at Yunevich Stadium in Alfred, New York. The team's head coach is Bob Rankl, who has held that position since the 2014 season, and is the program's fifth head coach since 1937.

== History ==
The program was formed in 1895 under coach George Hill. Early teams faced turmoil, with 22 coaches in the program's first 40 years. The program first found stability under coach Alex Yunevich, who has the most coaching wins in school history with 177. The team joined the Empire 8 in 1964, briefly leaving in 1990 before rejoining in 1999.

== Postseason appearances ==
=== NCAA Division III playoffs ===
The Saxons have made four appearances in the NCAA Division III playoffs, with a combined record of 4–4.

Year	Round	Opponent	Result
1981	Quarterfinals	Montclair State	L, 12–13
2009	First Round	Albright	L, 25–35
2010	First Round; Second Round; Quarterfinals	Maritime; Cortland; Mount Union	W, 60–0; W, 34–20; L, 7–37
2016	First Round; Second Round; Quarterfinals	Bridgewater State; Western New England; Mount Union	W, 33–27 ^{OT} W, 30–24; L, 45–70
