= Bob Rankl =

American football coach (born c. 1976)

Current position
- Title: Head coach
- Team: Alfred
- Conference: Empire 8
- Record: 71–58

Biographical details
- Born: c. 1976 (age 49–50)
- Education: Ursinus College (1999)

Playing career
- 1995–1998: Ursinus
- Position: Defensive lineman

Coaching career (HC unless noted)
- 1999–2000: Alfred (GA)
- 2001–2013: Alfred (OL)
- 2014–present: Alfred

Head coaching record
- Overall: 71–58
- Bowls: 3–1
- Tournaments: 2–1 (NCAA D-III playoffs)

Accomplishments and honors

Championships
- 2 Empire 8 (2016, 2020)

Awards
- Empire 8 Coach of the Year (2016)

Robert A. Rankl (born c. 1976) is an American college football coach. He is the head football coach for Alfred University, a position he has held since 2014. He previously was a long-time assistant for Alfred for fifteen years. He played college football for Ursinus as a defensive lineman.

== Head coaching record ==
Year	Team	Overall	Conference	Standing	Bowl/playoffs	D3^{#}
Alfred Saxons (Empire 8) (2014–present)
2014	Alfred	5–5	3–5	T–6th		
2015	Alfred	8–3	5–3	T–3rd	W Robert M. "Scotty" Whitelaw	
2016	Alfred	12–1	8–0	1st	L NCAA Division III Quarterfinal	12
2017	Alfred	8–3	5–2	T–2nd	W James Lynah	
2018	Alfred	7–4	4–3	T–3rd	W Asa S. Bushnell	
2019	Alfred	5–5	2–4	T–5th		
2020–21	Alfred	1–1	1–1	T–1st		
2021	Alfred	5–5	4–2	T–2nd		
2022	Alfred	2–8	1–5	6th		
2023	Alfred	4–6	2–4	T–4th		
2024	Alfred	7–4	5–2	T–2nd	L Asa S. Bushnell	
2025	Alfred	4–6	2–5	6th		
2026	Alfred	3–7	2–5	7th		
Alfred:		71–58	44–41			
Total:		71–58				
National championship Conference title Conference division title or championship game berth
