= Bob Frey (American football) =

American football coach and former player

Biographical details
- Education: Mount Union (1985)

Playing career
- 1981–1984: Mount Union

Coaching career (HC unless noted)
- 1985: Mount Union (assistant)
- ?: Manchester (IN) (assistant)
- 1994–2002: MacMurray
- 2003–2005: Tri-State
- 2006–2008: Olivet (OL)
- 2009: Anna Maria (AHC/OC)
- 2010–2013: Kansas Wesleyan (DC)
- 2014–2016: Lindenwood–Belleville (AHC/DC)
- 2018: Kentucky Christian (DC)

Head coaching record
- Overall: 63–59
- Tournaments: 0–2 (NCAA D-III playoffs)

Accomplishments and honors

Championships
- 2 SLIAC (1997–1998); 2 IBFC (2001–2002)

Awards
- MacMurray Hall of Fame (2015)

Bob Frey is an American football coach and former player. From 1994 to 2002, Frey was the head coach at MacMurray College in Jacksonville, Illinois, leading the Highlanders to two NCAA Division III playoff appearance. He later served as the head football coach at Tri-State University—now known as Trine University—in Angola, Indiana from 2003 to 2005.

== Head coaching record ==
Year	Team	Overall	Conference	Standing	Bowl/playoffs
MacMurray Highlanders (Illini-Badger Football Conference) (1994–1995)
1994	MacMurray	4–6	2–4	T–3rd	
1995	MacMurray	3–7	1–5	6th	
MacMurray Highlanders (Illini-Badger Football Conference / St. Louis Intercollegiate Athletic Conference) (1996–1999)
1996	MacMurray	7–3	3–2 / 3–1	3rd /	
1997	MacMurray	8–2	3–2 / 4–0	3rd / 1st	
1998	MacMurray	9–1	6–1 / 4–0	2nd / 1st	
1999	MacMurray	6–4	4–3 / 2–1	T–2nd /	
MacMurray Highlanders (Illini-Badger Football Conference) (2000–2002)
2000	MacMurray	5–5	3–4		
2001	MacMurray	9–2	7–0	1st	L NCAA Division III First Round
2002	MacMurray	10–1	7–0	1st	L NCAA Division III First Round
MacMurray:		61–31	46–22		
Tri–State Thunder (NAIA independent) (2003)
2003	Tri-State	0–10			
Tri–State Thunder (Michigan Intercollegiate Athletic Association) (2004–2005)
2004	Tri-State	2–8	2–5	T–6th	
2005	Tri-State	0–10	0–7	8th	
Tri-State:		2–28	2–12		
Total:		63–59			
National championship Conference title Conference division title or championship game berth
