= Maritime Privateers football =

College football team

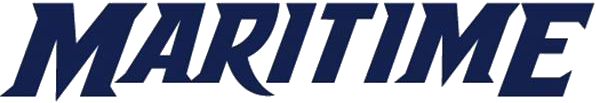
- First season: 1985; 41 years ago
- Athletic director: Mike Berkun
- Head coach: Anthony Trotta; 1st season, 0–0 (–)
- Stadium: Reinhart Field (capacity: 1,500)
- Location: Throggs Neck, New York
- NCAA division: Division III
- Conference: NEWMAC
- All-time record: 96–106 (.475)
- Bowl record: 1–3 (.250)

Conference championships
- 1 ECFC (2010)
- Rivalries: Massachusetts Maritine (Chowder Bowl)
- Colors: Cardinal, deep blue, and silver
- Mascot: Privateer
- Website: maritimeathletics.com/football

The Maritime Privateers football team represents the State University of New York Maritime College in college football at the NCAA Division III level. The Privateers are members of the New England Women's and Men's Athletic Conference (NEWMAC), fielding its team in the NEWMAC since 2023. The Privateers play their home games at Reinhart Field in Throggs Neck, New York.

Their current head coach is Anthony Trotta, who took over the position in 2025.

== Conference affiliations ==
- Independent (1985, 1987–1988, 2006–2008)
- Eastern Collegiate Football Conference (2009–2022)
- New England Women's and Men's Athletic Conference (2023–present)

== List of head coaches ==
=== Key ===
Key to symbols in coaches list
General		Overall		Conference		Postseason (Note: Although the first Rose Bowl Game was played in 1902, it has been continuously played since the 1916 game, and is recognized as the oldest bowl game by the NCAA. "—" indicates any season prior to 1916 when postseason games were not played.)	
No.	Order of coaches (Note: A running total of the number of head coaches, with coaches who served separate tenures being counted only once. Interim head coaches are represented with "Int" and are not counted in the running total. "—" indicates the team played but either without a coach or no coach is on record. "X" indicates an interim year without play.)	GC	Games coached	CW	Conference wins	PW	Postseason wins
DC	Division championships	OW	Overall wins	CL	Conference losses	PL	Postseason losses
CC	Conference championships	OL	Overall losses	CT	Conference ties	PT	Postseason ties
NC	National championships	OT	Overall ties (Note: Overtime rules in college football were introduced in 1996, making ties impossible in the period since.)	C%	Conference winning percentage		
†	Elected to the College Football Hall of Fame	O%	Overall winning percentage (Note: When computing the win–loss percentage, a tie counts as half a win and half a loss.)				

=== Coaches ===
List of head football coaches showing season(s) coached, overall records, conference records, postseason records, championships and selected awards
No.	Name	Season(s)	GC	OW	OL	O%	CW	CL	C%	PW	PL	DC	CC	NC	Awards
1	Charlie Munsch	1985	9	1	8	0.111	—	—	–	—	—	—	—	—	—
2	Jay Inaquinta	1987–1988	13	1	12	0.077	—	—	–	—	—	—	—	—	—
3	Clayton Kendrick-Holmes	2006–2017	118	63	55	0.534	37	23	0.617	0	1	—	1 ECFC (2010)	—	—
4	Vincent DiGaetano	2018	11	7	4	0.636	5	1	0.833	—	—	—	—	—	—
5	Mickey Rehring	2019–2023	40	16	24	0.400	11	13	0.458	0	1	—	—	—	—
6	Jamel Ramsay	2024	11	8	3	0.727	6	2	0.714	0	0	—	—	—	—
7	Anthony Trotta	2025–present	0	0	0	–	0	0	–	0	0	—	—	—	—

== Year-by-year results ==
National champions	Conference champions	Bowl game berth	Playoff berth

Season	Year	Head coach	Association	Division	Conference	Record					Postseason	Final ranking
Season	Year	Head coach	Association	Division	Conference	Overall		Conference			Postseason	Final ranking
Season	Year	Head coach	Association	Division	Conference	Win	Loss	Finish	Win	Loss	Postseason	Final ranking
Maritime Privateers
1985	1985	Charlie Munsch	NCAA	Division III	Independent	1	8	—	—	—	—	—
No team in 1986.
1987	1987	Jay Inaquinta	NCAA	Division III	Independent	1	6	—	—	—	—	—
1988	1988	Jay Inaquinta	NCAA	Division III	Independent	0	6	—	—	—	—	—
No team from 1989 to 2005.
2006	2006	Clayton Kendrick-Holmes	NCAA	Division III	Independent	1	6	—	—	—	—	—
2007	2007	Clayton Kendrick-Holmes	NCAA	Division III	Independent	2	8	—	—	—	—	—
2008	2008	Clayton Kendrick-Holmes	NCAA	Division III	Independent	4	5	—	—	—	—	—
2009	2009	Clayton Kendrick-Holmes	NCAA	Division III	ECFC	6	4	T–4th	3	3	—	—
2010	2010	Clayton Kendrick-Holmes	NCAA	Division III	ECFC	10	1	1st	6	1	L NCAA Division III First Round	—
2011	2011	Clayton Kendrick-Holmes	NCAA	Division III	ECFC	8	2	2nd	6	1	—	—
2012	2012	Clayton Kendrick-Holmes	NCAA	Division III	ECFC	3	6	5th	2	4	—	—
2013	2013	Clayton Kendrick-Holmes	NCAA	Division III	ECFC	5	5	3rd	5	2	—	—
2014	2014	Clayton Kendrick-Holmes	NCAA	Division III	ECFC	4	6	5th	3	4	—	—
2015	2015	Clayton Kendrick-Holmes	NCAA	Division III	ECFC	4	4	5th	3	4	—	—
2016	2016	Clayton Kendrick-Holmes	NCAA	Division III	ECFC	6	5	T–3rd	4	3	L ECAC Whitelaw Bowl	—
2017	2017	Clayton Kendrick-Holmes	NCAA	Division III	ECFC	9	2	2nd	6	1	L New England Bowl	—
2018	2018	Vincent DiGaetano	NCAA	Division III	ECFC	7	4	2nd	5	1	L New England Bowl	—
2019	2019	Mickey Rehring	NCAA	Division III	ECFC	5	6	2nd	3	2	L NCAA Division III First Round	—
No team in 2020 due to COVID-19.
2021	2021	Mickey Rehring	NCAA	Division III	ECFC	3	6	T–4th	3	3	—	—
2022	2022	Mickey Rehring	NCAA	Division III	ECFC	3	7	6th	2	4	—	—
2023	2023	Mickey Rehring	NCAA	Division III	NEWMAC	5	5	T–4th	3	4	—	—
2024	2024	Jamel Ramsay	NCAA	Division III	NEWMAC	8	3	T–2nd	5	2	W Fusion Bowl	—
