= Reinhart Field =

Stadium Bronx, New York

Reinhart Stadium
- Interactive map of Reinhart Stadium
- Location: 6 Pennyfield Ave New York, NY 10465
- Coordinates: 40°48′26.9382″N 73°47′51.8562″W
- Operator: State University of New York Maritime College
- Capacity: 1,500
- Surface: FieldTurf

Tenants
- Maritime College Privateers; Monroe Mustangs (2012)

The Reinhart Field is a 1,500 seat, expandable to 3,500 seat, multipurpose facility in Bronx, New York within the campus of SUNY Maritime College. Named after SUNY Maritime Athletic Director, Professor Roger Reinhart, the stadium is home to the Maritime College Privateers soccer, football, and lacrosse teams. In 2012 it also served the Monroe Mustangs of Monroe College as their home field.

Each year the SUNY Maritime Privateers face the Massachusetts Maritime Buccaneers in the annual Chowder Bowl football match, which is usually held as the season opening game for both teams. The ongoing rivalry has been contested six times. It has been held at Reinhart Field three years, in 2008, 2010, and 2012, while the other three were held at the Buccaneers' campus, at Clear Harbor Stadium, in 2007, 2009, and 2013. The 2011 game was on hiatus. The Privateers won the first five contests, with three captured at Reinhart.

Along with the Skyline Conference, the men's and women's Privateers soccer teams face off in non conference matches at Reinhart against local rivalries such as Lehman College and City College that form part of CUNYAC.

== See also ==
- List of soccer stadiums in the United States
