= 2010 NCAA Division III football season =

American college football season

- Regular season: August – November 2010
- Playoffs: November – December 2010
- National championship: Salem Football Stadium; Salem, VA
- Champion: Wisconsin–Whitewater (3)
- Gagliardi Trophy: Eric Watt (QB), Trine

The 2010 NCAA Division III football season, part of the college football season organized by the NCAA at the Division III level in the United States, began in August 2010, and concluded with the NCAA Division III Football Championship, also known as the Stagg Bowl, in December 2010 at Salem Football Stadium in Salem, Virginia. The Wisconsin–Whitewater Warhawks won their first Division III championship by defeating the Mount Union Purple Raiders, 31−21. This was the sixth of seven straight championship games between Mount Union (3 wins) and Wisconsin–Whitewater (4 wins).

The Gagliardi Trophy, given to the most outstanding player in Division III football, was awarded to Eric Watt, quarterback from Trine.

== Conference changes and new programs ==
School	2009 conference	2010 conference
Menlo	Northwest (Division III)	Independent (NAIA)

== Conference standings ==
2010 American Southwest Conference football standings
	Conf.			Overall
Team	W		L	W		L
No. 5 Mary Hardin–Baylor $^	8	–	0	12	–	1
Louisiana College	7	–	1	7	–	3
No. 24 Hardin–Simmons	6	–	2	8	–	2
McMurry	4	–	4	6	–	4
East Texas Baptist	4	–	4	5	–	5
Texas Lutheran	3	–	5	4	–	6
Mississippi College	2	–	6	4	–	6
Howard Payne	1	–	7	2	–	8
Sul Ross	1	–	7	1	–	8
$ – Conference champion; ^ – NCAA Division III playoff participant; Rankings from D3football.com

2010 Atlantic Central Football Conference standings
	Conf.			Overall
Team	W		L	W		L
No. 4 Wesley $^	3	–	0	12	–	1
Salisbury ^	2	–	1	7	–	3
Frostburg State	1	–	2	2	–	8
Apprentice §	0	–	3	2	–	8
$ – Conference champion; ^ – NCAA Division III playoff participant; § – Not an NCAA member; Rankings from D3football.com

2010 Centennial Conference football standings
	Conf.			Overall
Team	W		L	W		L
Ursinus +	7	–	2	8	–	2
Johns Hopkins +	7	–	2	8	–	3
Muhlenberg +^	7	–	2	7	–	4
Moravian	6	–	3	7	–	4
Gettysburg	5	–	4	6	–	4
Franklin & Marshall	5	–	4	6	–	5
McDaniel	4	–	5	5	–	5
Dickinson	3	–	6	3	–	7
Susquehanna	1	–	8	2	–	8
Juniata	0	–	9	0	–	10
+ – Conference co-champions; ^ – NCAA Division III playoff participant

2010 College Conference of Illinois and Wisconsin football standings
	Conf.			Overall
Team	W		L	W		L
No. 3 North Central (IL) $^	7	–	0	12	–	1
No. 11 Wheaton (IL) ^	6	–	1	10	–	2
Illinois Wesleyan	4	–	3	7	–	3
Augustana (IL)	4	–	3	6	–	4
Carthage	3	–	4	6	–	4
Elmhurst	3	–	4	6	–	4
Millikin	1	–	6	4	–	6
North Park	0	–	7	2	–	8
$ – Conference champion; ^ – NCAA Division III playoff participant; Rankings from D3football.com

2010 Eastern Collegiate Football Conference standings
	Conf.			Overall
Team	W		L	W		L
Maritime $^	7	–	0	10	–	1
Norwich	5	–	2	8	–	3
Castleton	5	–	2	5	–	4
Mount Ida	5	–	2	6	–	5
Gallaudet	3	–	4	3	–	5
Becker	2	–	5	2	–	8
Husson	1	–	6	1	–	9
Anna Maria	0	–	7	0	–	10
$ – Conference champion; ^ – NCAA Division III playoff participant

2010 Empire 8 Athletic Conference football standings
	Conf.			Overall
Team	W		L	W		L
No. 13 Alfred $^	5	–	0	10	–	3
St. John Fisher	3	–	2	9	–	2
Springfield	3	–	2	9	–	2
Ithaca	3	–	2	6	–	4
Hartwick	1	–	4	4	–	5
Utica	0	–	5	5	–	5
$ – Conference champion; ^ – NCAA Division III playoff participant; Rankings from D3football.com

2010 Heartland Collegiate Athletic Conference football standings
	Conf.			Overall
Team	W		L	W		L
No. 22 Franklin (IN) $^	8	–	0	9	–	2
Hanover	6	–	2	7	–	3
Defiance	6	–	2	6	–	4
Rose-Hulman	5	–	3	6	–	4
Mount St. Joseph	4	–	4	5	–	5
Bluffton	3	–	5	4	–	6
Anderson (IN)	3	–	5	3	–	7
Manchester	1	–	7	2	–	8
Earlham	0	–	8	0	–	10
$ – Conference champion; ^ – NCAA Division III playoff participant; Rankings from D3football.com

2010 Iowa Intercollegiate Athletic Conference football standings
	Conf.			Overall
Team	W		L	W		L
No. 12 Wartburg $^	8	–	0	10	–	1
No. 14 Coe ^	7	–	1	9	–	2
Central (IA)	6	–	2	8	–	2
Loras	4	–	4	5	–	5
Luther	4	–	4	5	–	5
Dubuque	3	–	5	4	–	6
Buena Vista	2	–	6	3	–	7
Simpson (IA)	2	–	6	2	–	8
Cornell (IA)	0	–	8	0	–	10
$ – Conference champion; ^ – NCAA Division III playoff participant; Rankings from D3football.com

2010 Liberty League football standings
	Conf.			Overall
Team	W		L	W		L
St. Lawrence $^	5	–	1	5	–	6
RPI	4	–	2	6	–	4
Hobart	3	–	3	5	–	4
Rochester (NY)	3	–	3	4	–	5
Merchant Marine	3	–	3	4	–	6
Union (NY)	2	–	4	2	–	7
WPI	1	–	5	3	–	7
$ – Conference champion; ^ – NCAA Division III playoff participant

2010 Michigan Intercollegiate Athletic Association football standings
	Conf.			Overall
Team	W		L	W		L
No. 10 Trine $^	6	–	0	11	–	1
Adrian	4	–	2	5	–	5
Albion	4	–	2	5	–	5
Hope	3	–	3	3	–	7
Alma	2	–	4	3	–	7
Kalamazoo	2	–	4	3	–	7
Olivet	0	–	6	0	–	10
$ – Conference champion; ^ – NCAA Division III playoff participant; Rankings from D3football.com

2010 Middle Atlantic Conference football standings
	Conf.			Overall
Team	W		L	W		L
No. 16 Delaware Valley $^	6	–	1	9	–	3
Lebanon Valley	5	–	2	6	–	5
Wilkes	5	–	2	6	–	5
Lycoming	4	–	3	6	–	4
Widener	4	–	3	5	–	5
Albright	3	–	4	5	–	5
King's	1	–	6	1	–	9
FDU Florham	0	–	7	3	–	7
$ – Conference champion; ^ – NCAA Division III playoff participant; Rankings from D3football.com

2010 Midwest Conference football standings
	Conf.			Overall
Team	W		L	W		L
St. Norbert $^	7	–	2	7	–	4
Carroll (WI)	6	–	3	7	–	3
Ripon	6	–	3	7	–	3
Monmouth (IL)	6	–	3	6	–	4
Grinnell	5	–	4	6	–	4
Beloit	5	–	4	5	–	5
Illinois College	5	–	4	5	–	5
Lake Forest	2	–	7	2	–	8
Lawrence	2	–	7	2	–	8
Knox	1	–	8	1	–	9
$ – Conference champion; ^ – NCAA Division III playoff participant

2010 Minnesota Intercollegiate Athletic Conference football standings
	Conf.			Overall
Team	W		L	W		L
No. 7 St. Thomas (MN) $^	8	–	0	12	–	1
No. 6 Bethel (MN) ^	7	–	1	12	–	2
Saint John's (MN)	6	–	2	7	–	3
St. Olaf	4	–	4	6	–	4
Concordia–Moorhead	4	–	4	5	–	5
Gustavus Adolphus	3	–	5	4	–	6
Augsburg	2	–	6	4	–	6
Carleton	2	–	6	3	–	7
Hamline	0	–	8	1	–	9
$ – Conference champion; ^ – NCAA Division III playoff participant; Rankings from D3football.com

2010 New England Football Conference standings
	Conf.			Overall
Team	W		L	W		L
Bogan Division
Framingham State x	6	–	1	9	–	2
Maine Maritime xy	6	–	1	8	–	3
Massachusetts Maritime	4	–	3	5	–	5
Westfield State	4	–	3	5	–	5
Bridgewater State	3	–	4	5	–	5
Worcester State	3	–	4	5	–	5
Coast Guard	1	–	6	2	–	7
Fitchburg State	1	–	6	1	–	9
Boyd Division
Western New England x	6	–	1	9	–	2
Endicott xy$^	6	–	1	9	–	3
Salve Regina	5	–	2	6	–	4
Curry	4	–	3	6	–	4
Plymouth State	4	–	3	6	–	4
UMass Dartmouth	2	–	5	3	–	7
Nichols	1	–	6	1	–	9
MIT	0	–	7	1	–	8
Championship: Endicott 38, Maine Maritime 35
$ – Conference champion; x – Division champion/co-champions; y – Championship game participant; ^ – NCAA Division III playoff participant

2010 New England Small College Athletic Conference football standings
	Conf.			Overall
Team	W		L	W		L
Williams $	8	–	0	8	–	0
Trinity (CT)	7	–	1	7	–	1
Amherst	6	–	2	6	–	2
Colby	4	–	4	4	–	4
Middlebury	4	–	4	4	–	4
Wesleyan	4	–	4	4	–	4
Bowdoin	3	–	5	3	–	5
Bates	2	–	6	2	–	6
Hamilton	1	–	7	1	–	7
Tufts	1	–	7	1	–	7
$ – Conference champion

2010 New Jersey Athletic Conference football standings
	Conf.			Overall
Team	W		L	W		L
No. 23 Rowan +	8	–	1	9	–	1
No. 18 Cortland +^	8	–	1	10	–	2
No. 19 Montclair State +^	8	–	1	10	–	2
Kean	5	–	4	5	–	5
TCNJ	5	–	4	5	–	5
Buffalo State	4	–	5	4	–	6
William Paterson	3	–	6	4	–	6
Brockport	2	–	7	2	–	8
Morrisville State	2	–	7	2	–	8
Western Connecticut	0	–	9	0	–	10
+ – Conference co-champions; ^ – NCAA Division III playoff participant; Rankings from D3football.com

2010 North Coast Athletic Conference football standings
	Conf.			Overall
Team	W		L	W		L
No. 17 Wittenberg $^	6	–	0	10	–	1
Wabash	5	–	1	8	–	2
Allegheny	4	–	2	7	–	3
Wooster	4	–	2	5	–	5
Oberlin	3	–	3	4	–	6
Denison	2	–	4	4	–	6
Ohio Wesleyan	2	–	4	2	–	8
Hiram	1	–	5	1	–	9
Kenyon	0	–	6	0	–	10
$ – Conference champion; ^ – NCAA Division III playoff participant; Rankings from D3football.com

2010 Northern Athletics Conference football standings
	Conf.			Overall
Team	W		L	W		L
Benedictine (IL) $^	7	–	0	8	–	3
Concordia (IL)	6	–	1	8	–	2
Aurora	5	–	2	7	–	3
Wisconsin Lutheran	4	–	3	6	–	4
Lakeland	3	–	4	4	–	6
Concordia (WI)	2	–	5	2	–	8
Maranatha Baptist	1	–	6	1	–	9
Rockford	0	–	7	0	–	10
$ – Conference champion; ^ – NCAA Division III playoff participant

2010 Northwest Conference football standings
	Conf.			Overall
Team	W		L	W		L
No. 9 Linfield $^	6	–	0	9	–	2
No. 20 Pacific Lutheran	5	–	1	8	–	1
Willamette	4	–	2	7	–	3
Whitworth	3	–	3	5	–	5
Lewis & Clark	2	–	4	4	–	5
Puget Sound	1	–	5	2	–	7
Pacific (OR)	0	–	6	0	–	9
$ – Conference champion; ^ – NCAA Division III playoff participant; Rankings from D3football.com

2010 Ohio Athletic Conference football standings
	Conf.			Overall
Team	W		L	W		L
No. 2 Mount Union $^	9	–	0	14	–	1
No. 8 Ohio Northern ^	8	–	1	10	–	2
Baldwin–Wallace	6	–	3	7	–	3
Otterbein	5	–	4	6	–	4
Capital	5	–	4	5	–	5
John Carroll	5	–	4	5	–	5
Heidelberg	4	–	5	5	–	5
Muskingum	2	–	7	3	–	7
Marietta	1	–	8	2	–	8
Wilmington (OH)	0	–	9	0	–	10
$ – Conference champion; ^ – NCAA Division III playoff participant; Rankings from D3football.com

2010 Old Dominion Athletic Conference football standings
	Conf.			Overall
Team	W		L	W		L
Washington and Lee $^	6	–	0	8	–	3
No. 25 Hampden–Sydney ^	5	–	1	9	–	2
Bridgewater	4	–	2	8	–	2
Randolph–Macon	3	–	3	7	–	3
Catholic University	2	–	4	4	–	6
Emory & Henry	1	–	5	5	–	5
Guilford	0	–	6	0	–	10
$ – Conference champion; ^ – NCAA Division III playoff participant; Rankings from D3football.com

2010 Presidents' Athletic Conference football standings
	Conf.			Overall
Team	W		L	W		L
No. 15 Thomas More $^	7	–	0	11	–	1
Washington & Jefferson	6	–	1	9	–	2
Waynesburg	4	–	3	6	–	4
Bethany (WV)	4	–	3	5	–	5
Grove City	3	–	4	5	–	5
Saint Vincent	3	–	4	3	–	7
Westminster (PA)	1	–	6	2	–	8
Thiel	0	–	7	0	–	10
Geneva #		–		5	–	5
$ – Conference champion; ^ – NCAA Division III playoff participant; # – Provisional NCAA Divisional III member; games not counted in standings; Rankings from D3football.com

2010 Southern California Intercollegiate Athletic Conference football standings
	Conf.			Overall
Team	W		L	W		L
No. 21 Cal Lutheran $^	6	–	0	8	–	2
Redlands	5	–	1	8	–	1
Claremont–Mudd–Scripps	4	–	2	7	–	2
Occidental	3	–	3	4	–	5
Whittier	1	–	5	2	–	7
La Verne	1	–	5	1	–	8
Pomona–Pitzer	1	–	5	1	–	8
$ – Conference champion; ^ – NCAA Division III playoff participant; Rankings from D3football.com

2010 Southern Collegiate Athletic Conference football standings
	Conf.			Overall
Team	W		L	W		L
DePauw $^	6	–	0	9	–	2
Millsaps	5	–	1	7	–	3
Centre	3	–	3	6	–	4
Rhodes	3	–	3	4	–	6
Austin	2	–	4	4	–	5
Trinity (TX)	2	–	4	4	–	6
Sewanee	0	–	6	1	–	9
Birmingham–Southern #		–		6	–	4
$ – Conference champion; ^ – NCAA Division III playoff participant; # – Provisional Division III member; games not counted in standings

2010 University Athletic Association football standings
	Conf.			Overall
Team	W		L	W		L
Chicago $	3	–	0	8	–	2
Washington University	2	–	1	7	–	3
Case Western Reserve	1	–	2	8	–	2
Carnegie Mellon	0	–	3	4	–	6
$ – Conference champion

2010 Upper Midwest Athletic Conference football standings
	Conf.			Overall
Team	W		L	W		L
Greenville $	6	–	0	7	–	3
St. Scholastica	5	–	2	7	–	3
Crown	4	–	2	6	–	3
Martin Luther	4	–	2	5	–	4
Minnesota–Morris	4	–	2	4	–	4
Westminster (MO)	3	–	4	5	–	5
Eureka	2	–	5	2	–	8
Northwestern (MN)	1	–	5	1	–	8
MacMurray	0	–	7	0	–	10
$ – Conference champion

2010 USA South Athletic Conference football standings
	Conf.			Overall
Team	W		L	W		L
North Carolina Wesleyan +	6	–	1	7	–	3
Christopher Newport +^	6	–	1	6	–	5
Ferrum	4	–	3	4	–	6
Shenandoah	4	–	3	4	–	6
Averett	3	–	4	5	–	5
Maryville (TN)	3	–	4	4	–	6
Greensboro	1	–	6	2	–	8
Methodist	1	–	6	2	–	8
+ – Conference co-champions; ^ – NCAA Division III playoff participant

2010 Wisconsin Intercollegiate Athletic Conference football standings
	Conf.			Overall
Team	W		L	W		L
No. 1 Wisconsin–Whitewater $^	7	–	0	15	–	0
Wisconsin–Stevens Point	5	–	2	7	–	3
Wisconsin–Stout	4	–	3	6	–	4
Wisconsin–Platteville	3	–	4	5	–	5
Wisconsin–Oshkosh	3	–	4	4	–	6
Wisconsin–La Crosse	3	–	4	3	–	7
Wisconsin–Eau Claire	2	–	5	4	–	6
Wisconsin–River Falls	1	–	6	1	–	9
$ – Conference champion; ^ – NCAA Division III playoff participant; Rankings from D3football.com

2010 NCAA Division III independents football records
	Conf.			Overall
Team	W		L	W		L
Macalester		–		6	–	3
Huntingdon		–		6	–	4
Chapman		–		4	–	5
LaGrange		–		3	–	7

== Conference champions ==
Conference champions
- American Southwest Conference – Mary Hardin–Baylor
- Atlantic Central Football Conference‡ – Wesley
- Centennial Conference – Johns Hopkins, Muhlenberg, and Ursinus
- College Conference of Illinois and Wisconsin – North Central (IL)
- Eastern Collegiate Football Conference – Maritime
- Empire 8 Conference – Alfred
- Heartland Collegiate Athletic Conference – Franklin
- Iowa Intercollegiate Athletic Conference – Wartburg
- Liberty League – St. Lawrence
- Michigan Intercollegiate Athletic Association – Trine
- Middle Atlantic Conference – Delaware Valley
- Midwest Conference – St. Norbert
- Minnesota Intercollegiate Athletic Conference – St. Thomas (MN)
- New England Football Conference – Framingham State and Maine Maritime (Bogan Division), Endicott and Western New England (Boyd Division)
  - Championship Game: Endicott 38, Maine Maritime 35
- New England Small College Athletic Conference – Williams
- New Jersey Athletic Conference – Montclair State, Rowan, and SUNY Cortland
- North Coast Athletic Conference – Wittenberg
- Northern Athletics Collegiate Conference – Benedictine (IL)
- Northwest Conference – Linfield
- Ohio Athletic Conference – Mount Union
- Old Dominion Athletic Conference – Washington & Lee
- Presidents' Athletic Conference – Thomas More
- Southern California Intercollegiate Athletic Conference – Cal Lutheran
- Southern Collegiate Athletic Conference – DePauw
- University Athletic Association – Chicago
- Upper Midwest Athletic Conference – Greenville
- USA South Athletic Conference – Christopher Newport and North Carolina Wesleyan
- Wisconsin Intercollegiate Athletic Conference – Wisconsin–Whitewater

== Postseason ==
The 2010 NCAA Division III Football Championship playoffs were the 38th annual single-elimination tournament to determine the national champion of men's NCAA Division III college football. The championship Stagg Bowl game was held at Salem Football Stadium in Salem, Virginia for the 18th time.

=== Qualification ===
Twenty-three conferences met the requirements for an automatic ("Pool A") bid to the playoffs. Besides the NESCAC, which does not participate in the playoffs, four conferences had no Pool A bid. The ECFC and UMAC were in the second year of the two-year waiting period, while the ACFC and UAA failed to meet the seven-member requirement.

Schools not in Pool A conferences were eligible for Pool B. The number of Pool B bids was determined by calculating the ratio of Pool A conferences to schools in those conferences and applying that ratio to the number of Pool B schools. The 23 Pool A conferences contained 197 schools, an average of 8.6 teams per conference. Twenty-eight schools were in Pool B, enough for three bids.

The remaining six playoff spots were at-large ("Pool C") teams.

=== Playoff bracket ===
First Round; Campus Sites
Wesley	53
Muhlenberg	14
Montclair State	16
Hampden–Sydney	14
Thomas More	42
Washington & Lee	14
Mary Hardin–Baylor	59
Christopher Newport	7
North Central (IL)	57
St. Norbert	7
Ohio Northern	37
Wittenberg	14
Trine	45
DePauw	35
Wisconsin–Whitewater	52
Franklin	21
Mount Union	49
St. Lawrence	0
Delaware Valley	23
Salisbury	12
Alfred	60
Maritime	0
SUNY Cortland	49
Endicott	35
St. Thomas (MN)	57
Benedictine	10
Linfield	42
Cal Lutheran	26
Bethel (MN)	28
Wartburg	20
Wheaton (IL)	31
Coe	21

Second Round; Campus Sites
Wesley	44
Montclair State	7
Thomas More	7
Mary Hardin–Baylor	69
North Central (IL)	28
Ohio Northern	9
Trine	31
Wisconsin–Whitewater	45
Mount Union	31
Delaware Valley	3
Alfred	34
SUNY Cortland	20
St. Thomas (MN)	24**
Linfield	17
Bethel (MN)	15
Wheaton (IL)	10

Quarterfinals; Campus Sites
Wesley	19
Mary Hardin–Baylor	9
North Central (IL)	10
Wisconsin–Whitewater	20
Mount Union	37
Alfred	7
St. Thomas (MN)	7
Bethel (MN)	12

Semifinals; Campus Sites
Wesley	7
Wisconsin–Whitewater	27
Mount Union	34
Bethel (MN)	14

National Championship Game; Salem Football Stadium; Salem, Virginia
Wisconsin–Whitewater	31
Mount Union	21

* Overtime

== See also ==
- 2010 NCAA Division I FBS football season
- 2010 NCAA Division I FCS football season
- 2010 NCAA Division II football season
