= Anna Maria College =

Catholic college in Paxton, Massachusetts, US

- Motto: Lux et Veritas
- Motto in English: Light and Truth
- Type: Private college
- Active: April 23, 1946–May 10, 2026
- Accreditation: NECHE
- Religious affiliation: Catholic Church (Sisters of Saint Anne)
- Academic affiliations: HECCMA
- Endowment: $7.2 million (2022)
- Students: 1,202 (fall 2024)
- Undergraduates: 916 (fall 2024)
- Postgraduates: 286 (fall 2024)
- Location: Paxton, Massachusetts, United States; 42.3294°N 71.9194°W
- Campus: Rural, 190 acres
- Colors: Cardinal and white
- Nickname: Amcats
- Sporting affiliations: NCAA Division III; MASCAC
- Website: annamaria.edu

Anna Maria College was a private Catholic college in Paxton, Massachusetts, United States. It was founded in 1946 as a women's college, but was coeducational from 1973. The school offered both undergraduate and graduate degrees. The college ceased operations at the end of the spring 2026 semester.

== History ==
Anna Maria College was founded in 1946 as a women's college by the Sisters of Saint Anne, after receiving formal approval from Richard Cushing, the Archbishop of Boston. The original campus was in Marlborough, Massachusetts. In 1951, the college moved to its present location in Paxton. Four years later, accreditation by the New England Association of Schools and Colleges was issued.

In 1973, Anna Maria College became coeducational and began graduate degree programs a year later. On April 3, 1980, the Sisters of Saint Anne ceased involvement in running the school, and a Board of Trustees was established.

In 2004, the college established the Molly Bish Center for the Protection of Children and the Elderly.

On April 10, 2026, the Massachusetts Department of Higher Education issued a warning pursuant to the regulatory notification requirements set forth in its Financial Assessment and Risk Monitoring (FARM) regulations that it "cannot confirm that Anna Maria College has sufficient resources to be able to sustain operations at current levels and substantially fulfill its obligations to enrolled and admitted students for both the current and the subsequent academic year".

On April 23, 2026, college leaders announced that the college would cease operations after the Spring 2026 semester. They cited ongoing financial challenges as the primary reason for closing the college. Transfer pathway agreements were arranged with Worcester State University, Regis College, Springfield College, Bay Path University, American International College, Fitchburg State University, Elms College, New England College, Rivier University, Albertus Magnus College, and the University of Massachusetts Lowell, allowing students in good standing to transfer to the aforementioned schools.

After the college’s permanent closure on May 10, 2026, school records and transcripts are held by Regis College in Weston. On June 27, 2026, Anna Maria College filed for Chapter 11 bankruptcy protection. The college's nursing program was sold to Assumption University. An October auction was planned to sell off the college's campus. However, it received no qualified bids.

== Academics ==
Anna Maria College had an average annual enrollment of around 1,500 students, mostly undergraduate and graduate students, and some continuing education learners. Rooted in the traditions of Catholic education, the college combined liberal arts and sciences education with career preparation.

The college was divided into four academic schools: the School of Business, School of Liberal Arts and Social Sciences, School of Nursing and Health Sciences, and the School of Professional Studies.

Anna Maria's fire science program was the largest in the Northeast United States.

== Athletics ==
Anna Maria College had thirteen Division III athletic teams, known as the AMCATS (Anna Maria College Athletic Team Sports), in the National Collegiate Athletic Association (NCAA), including men's baseball, basketball, football, ice hockey, lacrosse, and soccer; and women's basketball, ice hockey, field hockey, lacrosse, soccer, softball, and volleyball. The school was the first private college to be invited for core member status in the Massachusetts State Collegiate Athletic Conference (MASCAC).

The AAU Men’s Club Ice Hockey team won the national championship in Jacksonville, Florida, in March 2026, making them the university's first athletic team win a national title.

== Notable faculty ==
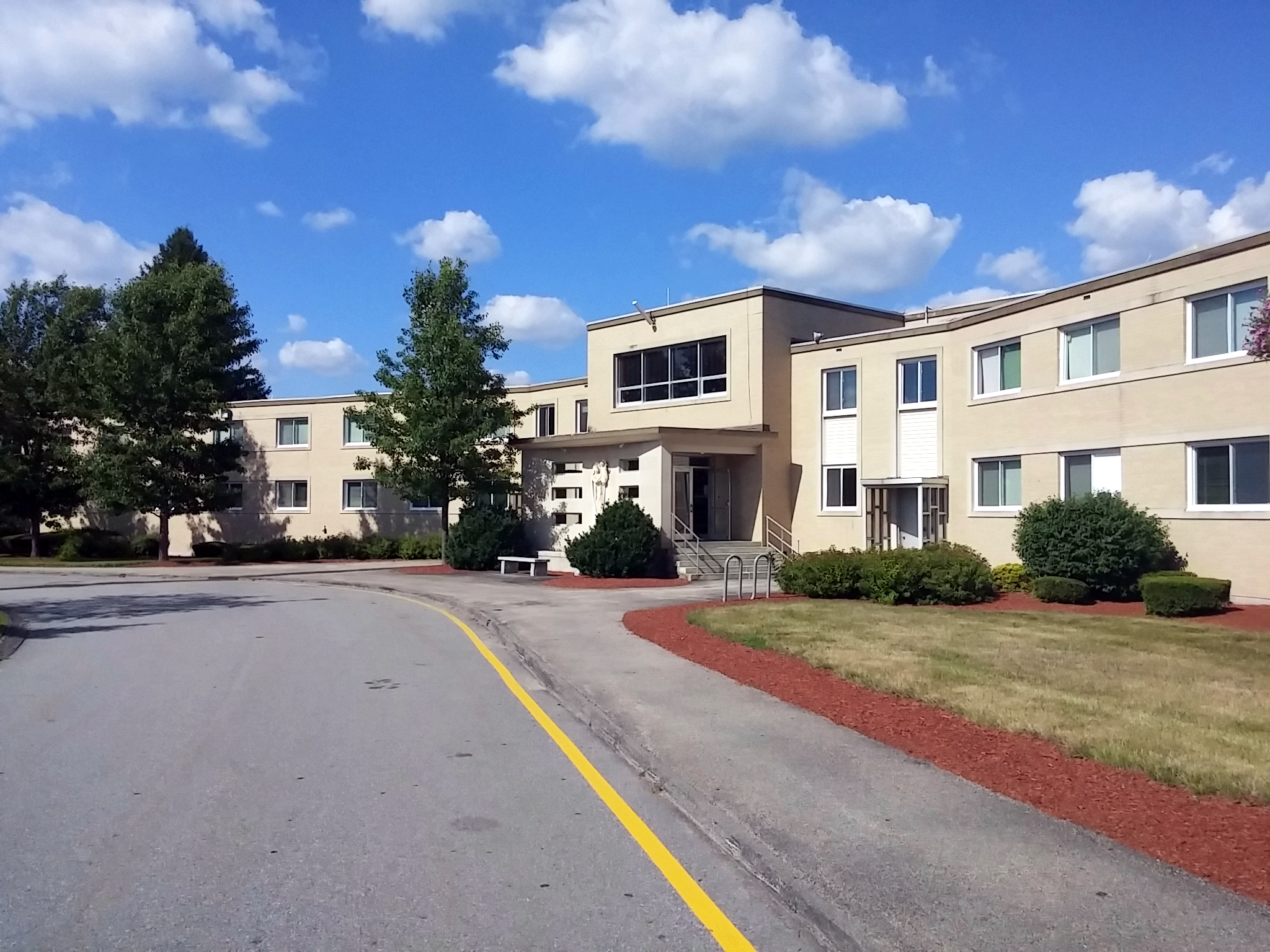
View of the Madonna Hall residences in 2016.

- Craig Blais (English)
- Mark Eshbaugh (art)
- Thomas Lewis (art)
- Brian Mitchell (history)

== Notable alumni ==
- Geraldo Alicea, politician
- Richard P. Cipro, US Army brigadier general
- Catherine Cool Rumsey, politician
- Ed Davis, law enforcement officer
- Brendan Doherty, law enforcement officer
- Shawn Dooley, politician
- James J. Dwyer, politician
- William B. Evans, law enforcement officer
- Raymond Hull, politician
- Brian Patrick Kennedy, politician
- Frederica Williams, healthcare executive
- Steven Xiarhos, politician
