= Eastern Collegiate Football Conference =

Collegiate football conference operating primarily in the northeastern United States

- Association: NCAA
- Founded: 2009
- Ceased: 2024
- Sports fielded: 1 (football)
- Division: Division III
- No. of teams: 4
- Headquarters: Marshfield, Massachusetts
- Region: Northeast

Locations

The Eastern Collegiate Football Conference (ECFC) was a football-only intercollegiate athletic conference affiliated with the NCAA's Division III. Founded in 2009, it combined four schools spread across the states of Massachusetts and New York, plus Washington, D.C.

== History ==
The Eastern Collegiate Football Conference was formed in the spring of 2009 as an NCAA Division III single-sport football conference. The conference, named after the geographic location of the institutions, began competition in the fall of 2009. Founding members were Anna Maria College, Becker College, Castleton State College (now Vermont State University–Castleton), Gallaudet University, Husson University, SUNY Maritime, Mount Ida College, and Norwich University.

Norwich was the league's first champion, posting a perfect 6–0 conference record and defeating Mt. Ida in the season-ending ECFC Championship Game. In 2010, SUNY Maritime earned the ECFC's first bid to the NCAA Division III Playoffs after a perfect 10–0 regular season record. SUNY Maritime would go on to lose 60–0 to Alfred University in the first round of the NCAA playoffs.

=== 2015 realignment ===
In April 2015, charter member Norwich announced it would be leaving the ECFC to join the NEWMAC when that conference began sponsoring football in 2017. In November 2015, Becker announced it would also be leaving the ECFC in 2017 to join what was then known as the New England Football Conference, which by the time of the college's departure would be rebranded as Commonwealth Coast Football. Becker's departure would have left the ECFC without the minimum seven teams necessary to maintain the league's automatic bid to the Division III playoffs. But on January 27, 2016, the ECFC announced that Alfred State College and Dean College would be joining the conference for the 2017 season.

=== Later developments ===
The ECFC would later see two schools announce their departure from the conference, placing its automatic bid to the Division III playoffs in doubt once again. First, Husson announced in June 2017 that it would join Commonwealth Coast Football in 2019. Then, in April 2018, the financially struggling Mount Ida announced that it would close at the end of the 2017–18 school year, with the campus to be purchased by the University of Massachusetts Amherst. The following month, however, saw the announcement of a future member, as Keystone College, set to add football as a club sport in 2019 before upgrading to full varsity status in 2020, would join the ECFC upon reaching varsity status.

=== 2020s realignment and dissolution ===
The ECFC faced significant member attrition throughout the 2020s. It began on June 23, 2021, when SUNY Maritime announced its departure from the ECFC at the end of 2022 to join the New England Women's and Men's Athletic Conference as a football affiliate for the 2023 season. On April 1, 2022, Keystone announced its addition to the Landmark Conference as a football affiliate also for 2023, when Landmark starts its sponsorship of that sport. The loss of members continued at a rapid pace through 2023: Alfred State announced it would be joining the Empire 8 in 2025 as a football affiliate, while Anna Maria, Dean, and Castleton University (now known as Vermont State University–Castleton) announced they would all join the Massachusetts State Collegiate Athletic Conference, with Anna Maria to join as a full member in 2025, and Castleton & Dean to join as affiliates in 2024 and 2025, respectively. Lastly, Gallaudet, the final remaining member, announced on July 3, 2024, that they had received an invitation to join the Old Dominion Athletic Conference as an associate member for football for the 2025 season, bringing an end to the ECFC after 15 years.

== Member schools ==
=== Final members ===
Institution	Location	Founded	Affiliation	Enrollment	Nickname	Joined	Left	Primary conference	Current football conference
Alfred State College	Alfred, New York	1908	Public	3,500	Pioneers	2017	2024	Allegheny Mountain (AMCC)	Empire 8
Anna Maria College	Paxton, Massachusetts	1946	Catholic (S.S.A.)	820	Amcats	2009	2024	Massachusetts (MASCAC)	
Dean College	Franklin, Massachusetts	1865	Nonsectarian	1,055	Bulldogs	2017	2024	Great Northeast (GNAC)	Massachusetts (MASCAC)
Gallaudet University	Washington, D.C.	1864	Quasigovernmental	1,274	Bison	2009	2024	United East (UEC)	Old Dominion (ODAC)

=== Former members ===
Because NCAA football is a fall sport, the year of departure is the calendar year after each school's final season of competition.

Institution	Location	Founded	Affiliation	Enrollment	Nickname	Joined	Left	Primary conference	Current football conference
Becker College	Leicester, Massachusetts	1784	Nonsectarian	1,739	Hawks	2009	2017	N/A – closed in 2021	
Husson University	Bangor, Maine	1898	Nonsectarian	2,600	Eagles	2009	2019	North Atlantic (NAC)	New England (CNE)
Keystone College	La Plume, Pennsylvania	1868	Nonsectarian	1,600	Giants	2020	2023	United East (UEC)	Landmark
Mount Ida College	Newton, Massachusetts	1899	Nonsectarian	1,300	Mustangs	2009	2018	N/A – closed in 2018	
Norwich University	Northfield, Vermont	1819	Private	2,200+	Cadets	2009	2017	Great Northeast (GNAC)	New England (NEWMAC)
State University of New York Maritime College (SUNY Maritime)	Throggs Neck, New York	1874	Public (Note: Part of the State University of New York System.)	1,289	Privateers	2009	2023	Skyline	New England (NEWMAC)
Vermont State University–Castleton (Note: Castleton University merged with Northern Vermont University and Vermont Technical College to become Vermont State University on July 1, 2023.)	Castleton, Vermont	1787	Public (Note: Part of the Vermont State Colleges System.)	2,130	Spartans	2009	2024	Little East (LEC)	New Jersey (NJAC)

== Champions ==
Eastern Collegiate Football Conference
Locations of all former ECFC members
Red text = college no longer exists
- 2009 Norwich (6–0)
- 2010 SUNY Maritime (7–0)
- 2011 Norwich (7–0)
- 2012 Mount Ida (6–1)
- 2013 Gallaudet (6–1)
- 2014 Husson (7–0)
- 2015 Norwich (6–1)
- 2016 Husson (6–0)
- 2017 Husson (7–0)
- 2018 Husson (6–0)
- 2019 Dean (4–1)
- 2020 None
- 2021 Anna Maria (5–1)
- 2022 Gallaudet (5–1)
- 2023 Alfred State (3–1)
- 2024 Alfred State (2–1)

=== NCAA Division III playoff performance ===
The ECFC was generally regarded as one of the weakest conferences in the country. At the conclusion of the 2024 season, the conference was 1–14 in the playoffs with the only Division III playoff victory coming in 2017. The single win was by two points, and one loss was in overtime; every other loss has been by more than two touchdowns.

Year	ECFC champion	Playoff opponent	Result	Score
2010	SUNY Maritime	Alfred	Loss	60–0
2011	Norwich	Delaware Valley	Loss	62–10
2012	Mount Ida	Wesley	Loss	73–14
2013	Gallaudet	Hobart	Loss	34–7
2014	Husson	MIT	Loss	27–20 (OT)
2015	Norwich	Albright	Loss	49–0
2016	Husson	Western New England	Loss	44–27
2017	Husson	Springfield	Win	23–21
2017	Husson	Delaware Valley	Loss	37–15
2018	Husson	RPI	Loss	38–14
2019	SUNY Maritime*	Salisbury	Loss	83–0
2020	None	Postseason canceled due to COVID-19 pandemic		
2021	Anna Maria	Delaware Valley	Loss	62–10
2022	Gallaudet	Delaware Valley	Loss	59–0
2023	Alfred State	Mount Union	Loss	56–14
2024	Alfred State	Endicott	Loss	44–0

*Received auto bid in place of Dean, which was ineligible as a provisional Division III member.
