= 2016 NCAA Division III football rankings =

- Season: 2016
- Postseason: Single-elimination
- Preseason No. 1: Mount Union
- National champions: ~~Mary Hardin–Baylor~~ (vacated via NCAA violation)
- Conference with most teams in final poll: WIAC (3)

Two human polls and a committee's selections comprise the 2016 National Collegiate Athletic Association (NCAA) Division III football rankings. Unlike in Division I's Football Bowl Subdivision (FBS), the NCAA, Division III college football's governing body, bestows a national championship on the winner of the Stagg Bowl – the championship round of a 32-team postseason tournament. The main weekly poll that begins in the preseason is the D3football.com poll, which ranks the top 25 colleges in Division III football. One additional poll is released midway through the season, the AFCA Division III Coaches Poll.

== Legend ==
	Increase in ranking
	Decrease in ranking
	Not ranked previous week
	Selected for Division III Football Championship Playoffs
(#–#)	Win–loss record
(Italics)	Number of first place votes
т	Tied with team above or below also with this symbol

== D3football.com poll ==
	Preseason July 19	Week 1 September 4	Week 2 September 11	Week 3 September 18	Week 4 September 25	Week 5 October 2	Week 6 October 9	Week 7 October 16	Week 8 October 23	Week 9 October 30	Week 10 November 6	Week 11 November 13	Final December 18	
1.	Mount Union (18)	Mount Union (0–0) (16)	Mount Union (1–0) (16)	Mount Union (2–0) (19)	Mount Union (3–0) (19)	Mount Union (4–0) (16)	Mount Union (5–0) (15)	Mount Union (6–0) (15)	Mount Union (7–0) (14)	Mount Union (8–0) (14)	Mount Union (9–0) (13)	Mary Hardin–Baylor (10–0) (18)	Mary Hardin–Baylor (15–0) (25)	1.
2.	Linfield (3)	Wisconsin–Whitewater (1–0) (4)	Wisconsin–Whitewater (2–0) (4)	Wisconsin–Whitewater (2–0) (2)	Wisconsin–Whitewater (3–0) (2)	Wisconsin–Whitewater (4–0) (1)	Wisconsin–Whitewater (5–0) (3)	Wisconsin–Whitewater (6–0) (2)	Wisconsin–Whitewater (7–0) (2)	Wisconsin–Whitewater (8–0) (2)	Mary Hardin–Baylor (9–0) (10)	Wisconsin–Whitewater (10–0) (5)	Wisconsin–Oshkosh (13–2)	2.
3.	Wisconsin–Whitewater (3)	Linfield (0–0) (4)	Linfield (1–0) (3)	Mary Hardin–Baylor (3–0) (3)	Mary Hardin–Baylor (3–0) (3)	Mary Hardin–Baylor (4–0) (7)	Mary Hardin–Baylor (5–0) (6)	Mary Hardin–Baylor (6–0) (7)	Mary Hardin–Baylor (7–0) (8)	Mary Hardin–Baylor (8–0) (8)	Wisconsin–Whitewater (9–0) (1)	St. Thomas (MN) (10–0) (2)	John Carroll (12–2)	3.
4.	St. Thomas (MN) (1)	St. Thomas (MN) (1–0) (1)	St. Thomas (MN) (2–0) (2)	St. Thomas (MN) (3–0) (1)	St. Thomas (MN) (4–0) (1)	St. Thomas (MN) (5–0) (1)	St. Thomas (MN) (6–0) (1)	St. Thomas (MN) (6–0) (1)	St. Thomas (MN) (7–0) (1)	St. Thomas (MN) (8–0) (1)	St. Thomas (MN) (9–0) (1)	Wisconsin–Oshkosh (9–1)	Mount Union (12–2)	4.
5.	Mary Hardin–Baylor	Mary Hardin–Baylor (1–0)	Mary Hardin–Baylor (2–0)	Wisconsin–Oshkosh (2–0)	Wisconsin–Oshkosh (3–0)	Wisconsin–Oshkosh (4–0)	Wisconsin–Oshkosh (4–1)	Wisconsin–Oshkosh (5–1)	Wisconsin–Oshkosh (6–1)	Wisconsin–Oshkosh (7–1)	Wisconsin–Oshkosh (8–1)	North Central (IL) (10–0)	Wisconsin–Whitewater (12–1)	5.
6.	Wisconsin–Oshkosh	Wisconsin–Oshkosh (1–0)	Wisconsin–Oshkosh (1–0)	Saint John's (MN) (3–0)	North Central (IL) (4–0)	North Central (IL) (4–0)	North Central (IL) (5–0)	North Central (IL) (6–0)	North Central (IL) (7–0)	North Central (IL) (8–0)	North Central (IL) (9–0)	John Carroll (9–1)	St. Thomas (MN) (12–1)	6.
7.	Wesley	Wheaton (IL) (1–0)	Wheaton (IL) (2–0)	North Central (IL) (3–0)	Linfield (1–1)	Wisconsin–Platteville (3–1)	Wisconsin–Platteville (4–1)	Wisconsin–Platteville (5–1)	Linfield (5–1)	Linfield (6–1)	Linfield (7–1)	Mount Union (9–1)	Linfield (9–2)	7.
8.	Wheaton (IL)	Saint John's (MN) (1–0)	Saint John's (MN) (2–0)	Wheaton (IL) (3–0)	Wisconsin–Platteville (3–0)	Linfield (2–1)	Linfield (3–1)	Linfield (4–1)	Saint John's (MN) (7–1)	Saint John's (MN) (7–1)	Saint John's (MN) (8–1)	Linfield (8–1)	Wheaton (IL) (11–2)	8.
9.	Saint John's (MN)	North Central (IL) (1–0)	North Central (IL) (2–0)	Linfield (1–1)	Johns Hopkins (4–0)	Johns Hopkins (5–0)	Johns Hopkins (5–0)	Johns Hopkins (6–0)	Johns Hopkins (7–0)	Johns Hopkins (8–0)	Johns Hopkins (9–0)	Saint John's (MN) (9–1)	Saint John's (MN) (10–2)	9.
10.	Hardin–Simmons	Wisconsin–Platteville (1–0)	Wisconsin–Platteville (2–0)	Wisconsin–Platteville (2–0)	Saint John's (MN) (3–1)	Wheaton (IL) (5–0)	Saint John's (MN) (5–1)	Saint John's (MN) (6–1)	Hardin–Simmons (6–1)	Hardin–Simmons (7–1)	Hardin–Simmons (8–1)	Johns Hopkins (10–0)	North Central (IL) (11–1)	10.
11.	Thomas More	Johns Hopkins (1–0)	Johns Hopkins (2–0)	Johns Hopkins (3–0)	Wheaton (IL) (4–0)	Saint John's (MN) (4–1)	Wheaton (IL) (6–0)	Hardin–Simmons (6–0)	Wisconsin–Platteville (5–2)	Wisconsin–Platteville (6–2)	Wisconsin–Platteville (7–2)	Hardin–Simmons (9–1)	Johns Hopkins (11–1)	11.
12.	Wisconsin–Platteville	Hardin–Simmons (1–0)	Hardin–Simmons (1–0)	Hardin–Simmons (2–0)	Hardin–Simmons (3–0)	Hardin–Simmons (4–0)	Hardin–Simmons (5–0)	Wheaton (IL) (6–1)	Wheaton (IL) (7–1)	Wheaton (IL) (7–1)	Wheaton (IL) (8–1)	Wisconsin–Platteville (8–2)	Alfred (12–1)	12.
13.	North Central (IL)	Wabash (1–0)	Wabash (1–0)	Wabash (2–0)	Salisbury (3–0)	Salisbury (4–0)	St. John Fisher (6–0)	Thomas More (6–1)	Thomas More (7–1)	Thomas More (8–1)	Thomas More (9–1)	Wheaton (IL) (9–1)	Hardin–Simmons (9–2)	13.
14.	Wabash	Delaware Valley (1–0)	Delaware Valley (2–0)	Delaware Valley (3–0)	St. John Fisher (4–0)	St. John Fisher (5–0)	Thomas More (5–1)	Franklin (5–1)	Stevenson (7–0)	Stevenson (8–0)	Alfred (9–0)	Alfred (10–0)	Wisconsin–Platteville (8–3)	14.
15.	Johns Hopkins	Salisbury (1–0)	Cortland (2–0)	Salisbury (2–0)	Huntingdon (3–0)	Thomas More (4–1)	Wittenberg (5–0)	Stevenson (6–0)	Alfred (7–0)	Alfred (8–0)	Coe (9–0)	Thomas More (9–1)	Wesley (9–3)	15.
16.	Albright	Cortland (1–0)	Salisbury (1–0)	St. John Fisher (3–0)	Thomas More (3–1)	Wittenberg (4–0)	East Texas Baptist (5–0)	St. Lawrence (6–0)	St. Lawrence (7–0)	St. Lawrence (8–0)	John Carroll (8–1)	Coe (10–0)	Wittenberg (10–2)	16.
17.	Cortland	Wesley (0–1)	Wesley (1–1)	Huntingdon (3–0)	East Texas Baptist (3–0)	East Texas Baptist (4–0)	Franklin (5–1)	Alfred (6–0)	Coe (8–0)	Coe (9–0)	Wabash (8–1)	Wittenberg (9–1)	Coe (11–1)	17.
18.	John Carroll	Ohio Northern (0–0)	East Texas Baptist (2–0)	Thomas More (2–1)	Wittenberg (3–0)	Franklin (4–1)	Stevenson (5–0)	Coe (7–0)	East Texas Baptist (6–1)	Salisbury (7–1)	St. John Fisher (8–1)	Wesley (8–2)	Thomas More (9–2)	18.
19.	Whitworth	Franklin (1–0)	Huntingdon (2–0)	East Texas Baptist (3–0)	Franklin (3–1)	Stevenson (5–0)	Wabash (4–1)	East Texas Baptist (5–1)	Salisbury (6–1)	Wabash (7–1)	Wittenberg (8–1)	Hobart (9–1)	Hobart (9–2)	19.
20.	Washington and Lee	East Texas Baptist (1–0)	Thomas More (1–1)	Franklin (2–1)	Stevenson (4–0)	Wabash (3–1)	St. Lawrence (6–0)	Wabash (5–1)	Wabash (6–1)	John Carroll (7–1)	Wesley (7–2)	Stevenson (9–1)	Stevenson (9–2)	20.
21.	Texas Lutheran	Huntingdon (1–0)	St. John Fisher (2–0)	Stevenson (3–0)	Hobart (4–0)	St. Lawrence (5–0)	Dubuque (6–0)	Rowan (5–1)	John Carroll (6–1)	East Texas Baptist (7–1)	Case Western Reserve (9–0)	Monmouth (IL) (10–0)	Monmouth (IL) (10–1)	21.
22.	Ohio Northern	Thomas More (0–1)	Franklin (1–1)	Hobart (3–0)	Christopher Newport (4–0)	Hobart (5–0)	Hendrix (5–0)	Salisbury (5–1)	Denison (7–0)	Wittenberg (7–1)	Hobart (8–1)	St. John Fisher (8–2)	Western New England (11–1)	22.
23.	Salisbury	John Carroll (0–1)	Washington & Jefferson (2–0)	Cortland (2–1)	Wabash (2–1)	Dubuque (5–0)	Alfred (5–0)	John Carroll (5–1)	Wittenberg (6–1)	St. John Fisher (7–1)	Stevenson (8–1)	St. Lawrence (9–1)	Frostburg State (10–1)	23.
24.	Huntingdon	St. John Fisher (1–0)	Stevenson (2–0)	Christopher Newport (3–0)	Central (4–0)	Hendrix (4–0)	Rowan (4–1)	Denison (6–0)	St. John Fisher (6–1)	Case Western Reserve (8–0)	Monmouth (IL) (9–0)	Frostburg State (9–1)	St. Lawrence (9–1)	24.
25.	Delaware Valley	Washington & Jefferson (1–0)	Hobart (2–0)	Central (3–0)	St. Lawrence (4–0)	Alfred (5–0)	Salisbury (4–1)	Delaware Valley (5–1)	Case Western Reserve (7–0)	Monmouth (IL) (8–0)	St. Lawrence (8–1)	Huntingdon (9–1)	St. John Fisher (8–3)	25.
	Preseason July 19	Week 1 September 4	Week 2 September 11	Week 3 September 18	Week 4 September 25	Week 5 October 2	Week 6 October 9	Week 7 October 16	Week 8 October 23	Week 9 October 30	Week 10 November 6	Week 11 November 13	Final December 18	
		Dropped: No. 16 Albright; No. 19 Whitworth; No. 20 Washington and Lee; No. 21 Texas Lutheran	Dropped: No. 18 Ohio Northern; No. 23 John Carroll	Dropped: No. 17 Wesley; No. 23 Washington & Jefferson	Dropped: No. 14 Delaware Valley; No. 23 Cortland	Dropped: No. 15 Huntingdon; No. 22 Christopher Newport; No. 24 Central	Dropped: No. 22 Hobart	Dropped: No. 13 St. John Fisher; No. 15 Wittenberg; No. 21 Dubuque; No. 22 Hendrix	Dropped: No. 14 Franklin; No. 21 Rowan; No. 25 Delaware Valley	Dropped: No. 22 Denison	Dropped: No. 18 Salisbury; No. 21 East Texas Baptist	Dropped: No. 17 Wabash; No. 21 Case Western Reserve	Dropped: No. 25 Huntingdon	

== AFCA Coaches Poll ==
	Week 3 September 19	Week 4 September 26	Week 5 October 3	Week 6 October 10	Week 7 October 17	Week 8 October 24	Week 9 October 31	Week 10 November 7	Week 11 November 14	Final December 19	
1.	Mount Union (2–0) (37)	Mount Union (3–0) (39)	Mount Union (4–0) (38)	Mount Union (5–0) (36)	Mount Union (6–0) (35)	Mount Union (7–0) (38)	Mount Union (8–0) (37)	Mount Union (9–0) (38)	Wisconsin–Whitewater (10–0) (24)	Mary Hardin–Baylor (15–0) (42)	1.
2.	Wisconsin–Whitewater (2–0) (3)	Wisconsin–Whitewater (3–0) (1)	Wisconsin–Whitewater (4–0) (2)	Wisconsin–Whitewater (5–0) (4)	Wisconsin–Whitewater (6–0) (5)	Wisconsin–Whitewater (7–0) (3)	Wisconsin–Whitewater (8–0) (4)	Wisconsin–Whitewater (9–0) (2)	Mary Hardin–Baylor (10–0) (12)	Wisconsin–Oshkosh (13–2)	2.
3.	Mary Hardin–Baylor (3–0) (2)	Mary Hardin–Baylor (3–0) (2)	Mary Hardin–Baylor (4–0) (2)	Mary Hardin–Baylor (5–0) (2)	Mary Hardin–Baylor (6–0) (2)	Mary Hardin–Baylor (7–0) (1)	Mary Hardin–Baylor (8–0) (1)	Mary Hardin–Baylor (9–0) (1)	St. Thomas (MN) (10–0) (6)	John Carroll (12–2)	3.
4.	St. Thomas (MN) (3–0)	St. Thomas (MN) (4–0)	St. Thomas (MN) (5–0)	St. Thomas (MN) (6–0)	St. Thomas (MN) (6–0)	St. Thomas (MN) (7–0)	St. Thomas (MN) (8–0)	St. Thomas (MN) (9–0) (1)	North Central (IL) (10–0)	Mount Union (12–2)	4.
5.	Wisconsin–Oshkosh (2–0)	Wisconsin–Oshkosh (3–0)	Wisconsin–Oshkosh (4–0)	Wheaton (IL) (6–0)	North Central (IL) (6–0)	North Central (IL) (7–0)	North Central (IL) (8–0)	North Central (IL) (9–0)	Wisconsin–Oshkosh (9–1)	St. Thomas (MN) (12–1)	5.
6.	Wheaton (IL) (3–0)	Wheaton (IL) (4–0)	Wheaton (IL) (5–0)	North Central (IL) (5–0)	Wisconsin–Oshkosh (5–1)	Wisconsin–Oshkosh (6–1)	Wisconsin–Oshkosh (7–1)	Wisconsin–Oshkosh (8–1)	Johns Hopkins (10–0)	Wisconsin–Whitewater (12–1)	6.
7.	North Central (IL) (3–0)	North Central (IL) (4–0)	North Central (IL) (4–0)	Wisconsin–Oshkosh (4–1)	Johns Hopkins (6–0)	Johns Hopkins (7–0)	Johns Hopkins (8–0)	Johns Hopkins (9–0)	Linfield (8–1)	Wheaton (IL) (11–2)	7.
8.	Saint John's (MN) (3–0)	Johns Hopkins (4–0)	Johns Hopkins (5–0)	Johns Hopkins (5–0)	Hardin–Simmons (6–0)	Linfield (5–1)	Linfield (6–1)	Linfield (7–1)	Mount Union (9–1)	Linfield (9–2)	8.
9.	Johns Hopkins (3–0)	Wisconsin–Platteville (3–0)	Hardin–Simmons (4–0)	Hardin–Simmons (5–0)	Linfield (4–1)	Saint John's (MN) (7–1)	Saint John's (MN) (7–1)	Saint John's (MN) (8–1)	Saint John's (MN) (9–1)	Johns Hopkins (11–1)	9.
10.	Wabash (2–0)	Hardin–Simmons (3–0)	Linfield (2–1)	Linfield (3–1)	Wisconsin–Platteville (5–1)	Wheaton (IL) (7–1)	Wheaton (IL) (7–1)	Wheaton (IL) (8–1)	John Carroll (9–1)	North Central (IL) (11–1)	10.
11.	Wisconsin–Platteville (2–0)	Linfield (1–1) т	Salisbury (4–0)	Wisconsin–Platteville (4–1)	Saint John's (MN) (6–1)	Hardin–Simmons (6–1)	Hardin–Simmons (7–1)	Hardin–Simmons (8–1)	Hardin–Simmons (9–1)	Saint John's (MN) (10–2)	11.
12.	Hardin–Simmons (2–0)	Salisbury (3–0) т	Wisconsin–Platteville (3–1)	Saint John's (MN) (5–1)	Wheaton (IL) (6–1)	Stevenson (7–0)	Stevenson (8–0)	Coe (9–0)	Wheaton (IL) (9–1)	Alfred (12–1)	12.
13.	Delaware Valley (3–0)	St. John Fisher (4–0)	Saint John's (MN) (4–1)	St. John Fisher (6–0)	Thomas More (6–1)	Thomas More (7–1)	St. Lawrence (8–0)	Thomas More (9–1)	Coe (10–0)	Hardin–Simmons (9–2)	13.
14.	Linfield (1–1)	Saint John's (MN) (3–1)	St. John Fisher (5–0)	Wittenberg (5–0)	Stevenson (6–0)	St. Lawrence (7–0)	Thomas More (8–1)	Wabash (8–1)	Thomas More (9–1)	Wesley (9–3)	14.
15.	Salisbury (2–0)	Huntingdon (3–0) т	Wittenberg (4–0)	East Texas Baptist (5–0)	St. Lawrence (6–0)	Coe (8–0)	Coe (9–0)	Wisconsin–Platteville (7–2)	Alfred (10–0)	Coe (11–1)	15.
16.	St. John Fisher (3–0)	Hobart (4–0) т	Hobart (5–0)	Dubuque (6–0)	Franklin (5–1)	Wabash (6–1)	Wabash (7–1)	Alfred (9–0)	Wisconsin–Platteville (8–2)	Wisconsin–Platteville (8–3)	16.
17.	Huntingdon (3–0)	Wittenberg (3–0)	East Texas Baptist (4–0)	Thomas More (5–1)	Coe (7–0)	Salisbury (6–1)	Wisconsin–Platteville (6–2)	Monmouth (IL) (9–0)	Monmouth (IL) (10–0)	Wittenberg (10–2)	17.
18.	Hobart (3–0)	East Texas Baptist (3–0)	Dubuque (5–0)	Franklin (5–1)	Wabash (5–1)	Wisconsin–Platteville (5–2)	Salisbury (7–1)	John Carroll (8–1)	Hobart (9–1)	Hobart (9–2)	18.
19.	Thomas More (2–1)	Thomas More (3–1)	Thomas More (4–1)	Stevenson (5–0)	Salisbury (5–1)	Monmouth (IL) (7–0)	Alfred (8–0)	St. John Fisher (8–1)	Muhlenberg (9–1)	Thomas More (9–2)	19.
20.	Wittenberg (2–0)	Dubuque (4–0)	Franklin (4–1)	St. Lawrence (6–0)	Monmouth (IL) (6–0)	Alfred (7–0)	Monmouth (IL) (8–0)	Case Western Reserve (9–0)	Wittenberg (9–1)	Monmouth (IL) (10–1)	20.
21.	Dubuque (3–0)	Franklin (3–1)	Stevenson (5–0)	Wabash (4–1)	Alfred (6–0)	East Texas Baptist (6–1)	East Texas Baptist (7–1)	Hobart (8–1)	Stevenson (9–1)	Western New England (11–1)	21.
22.	East Texas Baptist (3–0)	Stevenson (4–0)	St. Lawrence (5–0)	Salisbury (4–1)	East Texas Baptist (5–1)	John Carroll (6–1)	John Carroll (7–1)	Muhlenberg (8–1)	Wesley (8–2)	Stevenson (9–2)	22.
23.	Franklin (2–1)	Wabash (2–1)	Wabash (3–1)	Coe (6–0)	St. John Fisher (6–1)	St. John Fisher (6–1)	St. John Fisher (7–1)	Wittenberg (8–1)	Western New England (10–0)	Muhlenberg (9–2)	23.
24.	Muhlenberg (3–0)	St. Lawrence (4–0)	Wisconsin–Stevens Point (4–0)	Monmouth (IL) (5–0)	Hobart (5–1)	Denison (7–0)	Case Western Reserve (8–0)	Stevenson (8–1)	St. Lawrence (9–1)	Frostburg State (10–1)	24.
25.	St. Lawrence (3–0)	Christopher Newport (4–0)	Guilford (4–0)	Alfred (5–0) т; Hobart (5–1) т	John Carroll (5–1)	Hobart (6–1)	Hobart (7–1)	Wesley (7–2)	Huntingdon (9–1)	Redlands (8–2)	25.
	Week 3 September 19	Week 4 September 26	Week 5 October 3	Week 6 October 10	Week 7 October 17	Week 8 October 24	Week 9 October 31	Week 10 November 7	Week 11 November 14	Final December 19	
		Dropped: No. 13 Delaware Valley; No. 24 Muhlenberg	Dropped: No. 15 Huntingdon; No. 25 Christopher Newport	Dropped: No. 24 Wisconsin–Stevens Point; No. 25 Guilford	Dropped: No. 14 Wittenberg; No. 16 Dubuque	Dropped: No. 16 Franklin	Dropped: No. 24 Denison	Dropped: No. 13 St. Lawrence; No. 18 Salisbury; No. 21 East Texas Baptist	Dropped: No. 14 Wabash; No. 19 St. John Fisher; No. 20 Case Western Reserve	None	
