= 2017 NCAA Division III football rankings =

Football rankings

- Season: 2017
- Postseason: Single-elimination
- Preseason No. 1: Mary Hardin–Baylor
- National champions: Mount Union
- Conference with most teams in final poll: CCIW, MIAC, WIAC (3)

Two human polls and a committee's selections comprise the 2017 National Collegiate Athletic Association (NCAA) Division III football rankings. Unlike in Division I's Football Bowl Subdivision (FBS), the NCAA, Division III college football's governing body, bestows a national championship on the winner of the Stagg Bowl – the championship round of a 32-team postseason tournament. The main weekly poll that begins in the preseason is the D3football.com poll, which ranks the top 25 colleges in Division III football. The AFCA Division III Coaches Poll is released beginning midway through the season.

== Legend ==
	Increase in ranking
	Decrease in ranking
	Not ranked previous week
	Selected for Division III Football Championship Playoffs
(#–#)	Win–loss record
(Italics)	Number of first place votes
т	Tied with team above or below also with this symbol

== D3football.com poll ==
	Preseason July 10	Week 1 September 3	Week 2 September 10	Week 3 September 17	Week 4 September 24	Week 5 October 1	Week 6 October 8	Week 7 October 15	Week 8 October 22	Week 9 October 29	Week 10 November 5	Week 11 November 12	Final December 17	
1.	Mary Hardin–Baylor (16)	Mary Hardin–Baylor (0–0) (19)	Mary Hardin–Baylor (1–0) (18)	Mary Hardin–Baylor (2–0) (19)	Mary Hardin–Baylor (3–0) (21)	Mary Hardin–Baylor (4–0) (21)	Mary Hardin–Baylor (5–0) (21)	Mary Hardin–Baylor (6–0) (21)	Mary Hardin–Baylor (7–0) (21)	Mary Hardin–Baylor (8–0) (21)	Mary Hardin–Baylor (9–0) (21)	Mary Hardin–Baylor (10–0) (20)	Mount Union (15–0) (25)	1.
2.	Mount Union (3)	Mount Union (1–0) (4)	Mount Union (1–0) (5)	Mount Union (2–0) (5)	Mount Union (3–0) (4)	Mount Union (4–0) (4)	Mount Union (5–0) (4)	Mount Union (6–0) (4)	Mount Union (7–0) (4)	Mount Union (8–0) (4)	Mount Union (9–0) (4)	Mount Union (10–0) (3)	Mary Hardin–Baylor (14–1)	2.
3.	Wisconsin–Whitewater (4)	Wisconsin–Oshkosh (1–0) (2)	Wisconsin–Oshkosh (2–0) (2)	Wisconsin–Oshkosh (2–0) (1)	Wisconsin–Oshkosh (2–0)	Wisconsin–Oshkosh (3–0)	Wisconsin–Oshkosh (4–0)	Wisconsin–Oshkosh (5–0)	Wisconsin–Oshkosh (6–0)	Wisconsin–Oshkosh (7–0)	Wisconsin–Oshkosh (8–0)	Wisconsin–Oshkosh (9–0) (2)	Wisconsin–Oshkosh (12–1)	3.
4.	Wisconsin–Oshkosh (2)	St. Thomas (MN) (1–0)	Wheaton (IL) (2–0)	Wheaton (IL) (3–0)	North Central (IL) (3–0)	North Central (IL) (4–0)	North Central (IL) (5–0)	North Central (IL) (5–0)	St. Thomas (MN) (6–1)	St. Thomas (MN) (7–1)	St. Thomas (MN) (8–1)	St. Thomas (MN) (9–1)	St. Thomas (MN) (11–2)	4.
5.	St. Thomas (MN)	Wheaton (IL) (1–0)	North Central (IL) (1–0)	North Central (IL) (2–0)	Wheaton (IL) (4–0)	Hardin–Simmons (4–0)	Hardin–Simmons (4–1)	Hardin–Simmons (5–1)	Hardin–Simmons (6–1)	Hardin–Simmons (7–1)	Hardin–Simmons (8–1)	Hardin–Simmons (9–1)	Brockport (13–1)	5.
6.	Wheaton (IL)	North Central (IL) (1–0)	Linfield (1–0)	Saint John's (MN) (3–0)	Hardin–Simmons (3–0)	St. Thomas (MN) (4–1)	St. Thomas (MN) (5–1)	St. Thomas (MN) (5–1)	Linfield (5–1)	Saint John's (MN) (7–1)	Saint John's (MN) (8–1)	Saint John's (MN) (9–1)	Linfield (9–2)	6.
7.	North Central (IL)	Linfield (0–0)	Saint John's (MN) (2–0)	Hardin–Simmons (2–0)	St. Thomas (MN) (3–1)	Linfield (2–1)	Linfield (3–1)	Linfield (4–1)	Saint John's (MN) (7–1)	Delaware Valley (8–0)	Delaware Valley (9–0)	Delaware Valley (10–0)	Delaware Valley (12–1)	7.
8.	John Carroll	Saint John's (MN) (1–0)	Hardin–Simmons (1–0)	Linfield (1–1)	Linfield (1–1)	Saint John's (MN) (4–1)	Saint John's (MN) (5–1)	Saint John's (MN) (6–1)	Delaware Valley (7–0)	Linfield (6–1)	Linfield (7–1)	Linfield (8–1)	North Central (IL) (10–2)	8.
9.	Linfield	John Carroll (0–1)	John Carroll (0–1)	John Carroll (1–1)	Saint John's (MN) (3–1)	Wisconsin–Platteville (4–0)	Wisconsin–Platteville (5–0)	Delaware Valley (7–0)	Wisconsin–Platteville (6–1)	North Central (IL) (7–1)	North Central (IL) (8–1)	North Central (IL) (9–1)	Frostburg State (11–2)	9.
10.	Saint John's (MN)	Hardin–Simmons (0–0)	St. Thomas (MN) (1–1)	St. Thomas (MN) (2–1)	Delaware Valley (4–0)	Delaware Valley (5–0)	Delaware Valley (6–0)	Wisconsin–Platteville (5–1)	North Central (IL) (6–1)	Brockport (8–0)	Brockport (9–0)	Brockport (10–0)	Wartburg (12–1)	10.
11.	Wesley	Frostburg State (1–0)	Frostburg State (2–0)	Frostburg State (3–0)	Frostburg State (4–0)	Frostburg State (4–0)	Illinois Wesleyan (5–1)	Illinois Wesleyan (6–1)	Brockport (7–0)	Illinois Wesleyan (8–1)	Illinois Wesleyan (8–1)	Illinois Wesleyan (9–1)	Hardin–Simmons (9–2)	11.
12.	Hardin–Simmons	Delaware Valley (1–0)	Delaware Valley (2–0)	Delaware Valley (3–0)	Wisconsin–Platteville (3–0)	Illinois Wesleyan (4–1)	Wittenberg (5–0)	Brockport (6–0)	Illinois Wesleyan (7–1)	Wittenberg (8–0)	Wittenberg (9–0)	Wittenberg (10–0)	Wesley (10–2)	12.
13.	Johns Hopkins	Wisconsin–Platteville (1–0)	Wisconsin–Platteville (1–0)	Wisconsin–Platteville (2–0)	Johns Hopkins (4–0)	Wheaton (IL) (4–1)	Brockport (5–0)	Wittenberg (6–0)	Wittenberg (7–0)	Wesley (7–1)	Wesley (8–1)	Wesley (9–1)	Case Western Reserve (11–1)	13.
14.	Hobart	Illinois Wesleyan (1–0)	Johns Hopkins (2–0)	Johns Hopkins (3–0)	Whitworth (3–0)	Wittenberg (4–0)	Wesley (4–1)	Wesley (5–1)	Wesley (6–1)	Frostburg State (7–1)	Case Western Reserve (9–0)	Washington & Jefferson (10–0)	Saint John's (MN) (9–2)	14.
15.	Wisconsin–Platteville	Wisconsin–Whitewater (0–1)	Wittenberg (1–0)	Whitworth (3–0)	Wittenberg (3–0)	Brockport (5–0)	Washington & Jefferson (5–0)	Washington & Jefferson (6–0)	Frostburg State (6–1)	Washington & Jefferson (8–0)	Washington & Jefferson (9–0)	Frostburg State (9–1)	Berry (11–1)	15.
16.	Wittenberg	Johns Hopkins (1–0)	Illinois Wesleyan (2–0)	Wittenberg (2–0)	Brockport (4–0)	Washington & Jefferson (3–0)	Case Western Reserve (5–0)	Frostburg State (5–1)	Washington & Jefferson (7–0)	Case Western Reserve (8–0)	Frostburg State (8–1)	Case Western Reserve (10–0)	Washington & Jefferson (11–1)	16.
17.	Frostburg State	Wittenberg (1–0)	Case Western Reserve (1–0)	Washington & Jefferson (3–0)	Washington & Jefferson (3–0)	Case Western Reserve (4–0)	Alfred (5–0)	Case Western Reserve (6–0)	Case Western Reserve (7–0)	Berry (9–0)	Berry (9–0)	Wartburg (10–0)	Illinois Wesleyan (9–2)	17.
18.	Stevenson	Thomas More (1–0)	Washington & Jefferson (2–0)	Case Western Reserve (2–0)	Case Western Reserve (3–0)	Alfred (4–0)	Frostburg State (4–1)	Berry (7–0)	Berry (8–0)	Wartburg (8–0)	Wartburg (9–0)	Berry (10–0)	Wittenberg (10–1)	18.
19.	Thomas More	Case Western Reserve (1–0)	Alfred (1–0)	Brockport (3–0)	Illinois Wesleyan (3–1)	Wesley (3–1)	Berry (6–0)	George Fox (5–1)	Wartburg (7–0)	Concordia Moorhead (7–1)	Concordia Moorhead (8–1)	Springfield (10–0)	Trine (11–1)	19.
20.	Delaware Valley	Redlands (1–0)	Whitworth (2–0)	Illinois Wesleyan (2–1)	Alfred (3–0)	Concordia Moorhead (4–0)	Wabash (5–0)	Wartburg (6–0)	George Fox (5–2)	Wisconsin–Platteville (6–2)	Springfield (9–0)	Concordia Moorhead (8–2)	Johns Hopkins (9–2)	20.
21.	Alfred	Alfred (1–0)	Redlands (1–0)	Concordia Moorhead (3–0)	Concordia Moorhead (3–0)	Heidelberg (4–0)	George Fox (4–1)	Concordia Moorhead (5–1)	Concordia Moorhead (6–1)	George Fox (6–2)	Johns Hopkins (8–1)	Johns Hopkins (9–1)	Concordia Moorhead (8–2)	21.
22.	Case Western Reserve	Wesley (0–1)	Brockport (2–0)	Wesley (1–1)	Wisconsin–Stout (2–0)	Whitworth (3–1)	Wartburg (5–0)	Johns Hopkins (5–1)	Springfield (8–0)	Springfield (8–0)	Wheaton (IL) (7–2)	Wheaton (IL) (8–2)	Wheaton (IL) (8–2)	22.
23.	St. John Fisher	Washington & Jefferson (1–0)	Concordia Moorhead (2–0)	Alfred (2–0)	Wesley (2–1)	Wisconsin–Stout (2–1)	Concordia Moorhead (4–1)	Springfield (7–0)	Wheaton (IL) (6–2)	Johns Hopkins (7–1)	Wisconsin–Whitewater (6–3)	Wisconsin–Whitewater (7–3)	Wisconsin–Whitewater (7–3)	23.
24.	Western New England	Whitworth (1–0)	Wesley (0–1)	Wisconsin–Stout (2–0)	Heidelberg (3–0)	Berry (5–0)	Johns Hopkins (5–1)	Heidelberg (5–1)	Johns Hopkins (6–1)	Wheaton (IL) (6–2)	Wisconsin–La Crosse (7–2)	Wisconsin–La Crosse (8–2)	Wisconsin–La Crosse (8–2)	24.
25.	Redlands	Brockport (1–0)	Wisconsin–Stout (2–0)	Wabash (2–0)	Wabash (3–0)	Wabash (4–0)	Springfield (6–0)	DePauw (6–0)	Salisbury (6–1)	Salisbury (7–1)	Trine (9–0)	Trine (10–0)	Franklin (8–3) т; Husson (10–2) т	25.
	Preseason July 10	Week 1 September 3	Week 2 September 10	Week 3 September 17	Week 4 September 24	Week 5 October 1	Week 6 October 8	Week 7 October 15	Week 8 October 22	Week 9 October 29	Week 10 November 5	Week 11 November 12	Final December 17	
		Dropped: No. 14 Hobart; No. 18 Stevenson; No. 23 St. John Fisher; No. 24 Western New England	Dropped: No. 15 Wisconsin–Whitewater; No. 18 Thomas More	Dropped: No. 21 Redlands	Dropped: No. 9 John Carroll	Dropped: No. 13 Johns Hopkins	Dropped: No. 13 Wheaton (IL); No. 21 Heidelberg; No. 22 Whitworth; No. 23 Wisconsin–Stout	Dropped: No. 17 Alfred; No. 20 Wabash	Dropped: No. 24 Heidelberg; No. 25 DePauw	None	Dropped: No. 20 Wisconsin–Platteville; No. 21 George Fox; No. 25 Salisbury	None	Dropped: No. 19 Springfield	

== AFCA Coaches Poll ==
	Week 3 September 18	Week 4 September 25	Week 5 October 4	Week 6 October 9	Week 7 October 18	Week 8 October 23	Week 9 October 30	Week 10 November 6	Week 11 November 13	Final December 18	
1.	Mary Hardin–Baylor (2–0) (45)	Mary Hardin–Baylor (3–0) (49)	Mary Hardin–Baylor (4–0) (49)	Mary Hardin–Baylor (5–0) (46)	Mary Hardin–Baylor (6–0) (46)	Mary Hardin–Baylor (7–0) (46)	Mary Hardin–Baylor (8–0) (46)	Mary Hardin–Baylor (9–0) (45)	Mary Hardin–Baylor (10–0) (45)	Mount Union (15–0) (51)	1.
2.	Mount Union (2–0) (7)	Mount Union (3–0) (3)	Mount Union (4–0) (3)	Mount Union (5–0) (6)	Mount Union (6–0) (5)	Mount Union (7–0) (5)	Mount Union (8–0) (5)	Mount Union (9–0) (6)	Mount Union (10–0) (5)	Mary Hardin–Baylor (14–1)	2.
3.	Wisconsin–Oshkosh (2–0)	Wisconsin–Oshkosh (2–0)	Wisconsin–Oshkosh (3–0)	Wisconsin–Oshkosh (4–0)	Wisconsin–Oshkosh (5–0) (1)	Wisconsin–Oshkosh (6–0) (1)	Wisconsin–Oshkosh (7–0)	Wisconsin–Oshkosh (8–0)	Wisconsin–Oshkosh (9–0)	Wisconsin–Oshkosh (12–1)	3.
4.	Wheaton (IL) (3–0)	Wheaton (IL) (4–0)	North Central (IL) (4–0)	North Central (IL) (5–0)	St. Thomas (MN) (5–1)	St. Thomas (MN) (6–1)	St. Thomas (MN) (7–1) (1)	St. Thomas (MN) (8–1) (1)	St. Thomas (MN) (9–1) (1)	St. Thomas (MN) (11–2)	4.
5.	North Central (IL) (2–0)	North Central (IL) (3–0)	Hardin–Simmons (4–0)	St. Thomas (MN) (5–1)	Delaware Valley (7–0)	Delaware Valley (7–0)	Delaware Valley (8–0)	Delaware Valley (9–0)	Delaware Valley (10–0)	Brockport (13–1)	5.
6.	Saint John's (MN) (3–0)	Hardin–Simmons (3–0)	St. Thomas (MN) (4–1)	Delaware Valley (6–0)	Hardin–Simmons (5–1)	Hardin–Simmons (6–1)	Hardin–Simmons (7–1)	Hardin–Simmons (8–1)	Hardin–Simmons (9–1)	Delaware Valley (12–1)	6.
7.	Hardin–Simmons (2–0)	St. Thomas (MN) (3–1)	Delaware Valley (5–0)	Wisconsin–Platteville (5–0)	Saint John's (MN) (6–1)	Saint John's (MN) (7–1)	Saint John's (MN) (7–1)	Saint John's (MN) (8–1)	Saint John's (MN) (9–1)	Linfield (9–2)	7.
8.	Johns Hopkins (3–0)	Johns Hopkins (4–0)	Wisconsin–Platteville (4–0)	Hardin–Simmons (4–1)	Linfield (4–1)	Linfield (5–1)	Linfield (6–1)	Linfield (7–1)	Linfield (8–1)	Wartburg (12–1)	8.
9.	Delaware Valley (3–0)	Delaware Valley (4–0)	Frostburg State (4–0)	Saint John's (MN) (5–1)	Wittenberg (6–0)	Wittenberg (7–0)	Wittenberg (8–0)	Wittenberg (9–0)	Wittenberg (10–0)	Frostburg State (11–2)	9.
10.	Wisconsin–Platteville (2–0)	Wisconsin–Platteville (3–0)	Saint John's (MN) (4–1)	Linfield (3–1)	Washington & Jefferson (6–0)	Washington & Jefferson (7–0)	Washington & Jefferson (8–0)	Washington & Jefferson (9–0)	Washington & Jefferson (10–0)	North Central (IL) (10–2)	10.
11.	St. Thomas (MN) (2–1)	Frostburg State (4–0)	Linfield (2–1)	Wittenberg (5–0)	Illinois Wesleyan (6–1)	Illinois Wesleyan (7–1)	Illinois Wesleyan (8–1)	Illinois Wesleyan (8–1)	Brockport (10–0)	Hardin–Simmons (9–2)	11.
12.	Frostburg State (3–0)	Saint John's (MN) (3–1)	Wittenberg (4–0)	Washington & Jefferson (5–0)	Wisconsin–Platteville (5–1)	Wisconsin–Platteville (6–1)	Brockport (8–0)	Brockport (9–0)	Illinois Wesleyan (9–1)	Washington & Jefferson (11–1)	12.
13.	John Carroll (1–1)	Wittenberg (3–0)	Washington & Jefferson (4–0)	Illinois Wesleyan (5–1)	Brockport (6–0)	Brockport (7–0)	Wesley (7–1)	Wesley (8–1)	Wesley (9–1)	Wesley (10–2)	13.
14.	Wittenberg (2–0)	Linfield (1–1)	Illinois Wesleyan (4–1)	Brockport (5–0)	Wesley (5–1)	Wesley (6–1)	North Central (IL) (7–1)	North Central (IL) (8–1)	North Central (IL) (9–1)	Saint John's (MN) (9–2)	14.
15.	Linfield (1–1)	Washington & Jefferson (3–0)	Concordia Moorhead (4–0)	Alfred (5–0)	North Central (IL) (5–1)	North Central (IL) (6–1)	Wartburg (8–0)	Wartburg (9–0)	Wartburg (10–0)	Case Western Reserve (11–1)	15.
16.	Washington & Jefferson (3–0)	Concordia Moorhead (3–0)	Brockport (5–0)	Wesley (4–1)	Case Western Reserve (6–0)	Wartburg (7–0)	Case Western Reserve (8–0)	Case Western Reserve (9–0)	Case Western Reserve (10–0)	Berry (11–1)	16.
17.	Alfred (2–0)	Alfred (3–0)	Alfred (4–0)	Case Western Reserve (5–0)	Wartburg (6–0)	Case Western Reserve (7–0)	Frostburg State (7–1)	Frostburg State (8–1)	Frostburg State (9–1)	Wittenberg (10–1)	17.
18.	Concordia Moorhead (3–0)	Brockport (4–0)	Wheaton (IL) (4–1)	Wabash (5–0)	Frostburg State (5–1)	Frostburg State (6–1)	Concordia Moorhead (7–1)	Concordia Moorhead (8–1)	Berry (10–0)	Illinois Wesleyan (9–2)	18.
19.	Brockport (3–0)	Whitworth (3–0)	Case Western Reserve (4–0)	Frostburg State (4–1)	Concordia Moorhead (5–1)	Concordia Moorhead (6–1)	Berry (9–0)	Berry (9–0)	Johns Hopkins (9–1)	Trine (11–1)	19.
20.	Whitworth (3–0)	Case Western Reserve (3–0)	Wesley (3–1)	Wartburg (5–0)	Berry (7–0)	Berry (8–0)	Johns Hopkins (7–1)	Johns Hopkins (8–1)	Springfield (10–0)	Johns Hopkins (9–2)	20.
21.	Case Western Reserve (2–0)	Illinois Wesleyan (3–1)	Wabash (4–0)	Concordia Moorhead (4–1)	Johns Hopkins (5–1)	Johns Hopkins (6–1)	Springfield (8–0)	Springfield (9–0)	Wheaton (IL) (8–2)	Husson (10–2)	21.
22.	Wabash (2–0)	Wesley (2–1)	Heidelberg (4–0)	Johns Hopkins (5–1)	Springfield (7–0)	Springfield (8–0)	Wheaton (IL) (6–2)	Wheaton (IL) (7–2)	Trine (10–0)	Concordia Moorhead (8–2)	22.
23.	Illinois Wesleyan (2–1)	Wabash (3–0)	Johns Hopkins (4–1)	Berry (6–0)	Wheaton (IL) (5–2)	Wheaton (IL) (6–2)	George Fox (6–2)	Trine (9–0)	Concordia Moorhead (8–2)	Springfield (10–1)	23.
24.	Wesley (1–1)	Heidelberg (3–0)	Albright (5–0)	Wisconsin–La Crosse (5–0)	George Fox (5–1)	George Fox (5–2)	Wisconsin–Platteville (6–2)	Huntingdon (8–1)	Huntingdon (9–1)	Wheaton (IL) (8–2)	24.
25.	Dubuque (3–0)	Wisconsin–Stout (2–0)	Wartburg (4–0)	Springfield (6–0)	Alfred (5–1)	Wabash (6–1)	Trine (8–0)	Wisconsin–La Crosse (7–2)	Wisconsin–La Crosse (8–2)	Wisconsin–La Crosse (8–2)	25.
	Week 3 September 18	Week 4 September 25	Week 5 October 4	Week 6 October 9	Week 7 October 18	Week 8 October 23	Week 9 October 30	Week 10 November 6	Week 11 November 13	Final December 18	
		Dropped: No. 13 John Carroll; No. 25 Dubuque	Dropped: No. 19 Whitworth; No. 25 Wisconsin–Stout	Dropped: No. 18 Wheaton (IL); No. 22 Heidelberg; No. 24 Albright	Dropped: No. 18 Wabash; No. 24 Wisconsin–La Crosse	Dropped: No. 25 Alfred	Dropped: No. 25 Wabash	Dropped: No. 23 George Fox; No. 24 Wisconsin–Platteville	None	Dropped: No. 24 Huntingdon	
