= Chris Casey (American football) =

American football coach (born c. 1958–1959)

Biographical details
- Born: c. 1958 or 1959 (age 67–68); Newberg, Oregon, U.S.

Playing career
- 1977–1978: Mt. Hood
- 1979–1981: Linfield
- Position: Linebacker

Coaching career (HC unless noted)
- 1982–1984: Dalles Wahtonka HS (OR) (assistant)
- 1985–1991: Linfield (LB)
- 1992–1993: Linfield (LB/DL)
- 1994–2003: Whitworth (DC)
- 2004–2012: Aloha HS (OR)
- 2013–2024: George Fox

Head coaching record
- Overall: 51–48 (college); 49–43 (high school)

Christopher Casey (born c. 1958 or 1959) is a former American college football coach.

Casey played college football as a linebacker for Mt. Hood Community College (1977–1978) and Linfield College (1979–1981). He began his coaching career from 1982 to 1984 at The Dalles Wahtonka High School—now known as The Dalles High School. He returned to Linfield as an assistant coach from 1985 to 1994. From 1994 to 2004, he was an assistant coach at Whitworth.

Casey was the head football coach for Aloha High School from 2004 to 2012. He led Aloha to the OSAA Class 6A championship in 2010.

In February 2012, Casey was hired as head football coach at George Fox, though on the condition that he would remain at Aloha for the 2012 season and then join George Fox in 2013 and restart the football program for the 2014 season. Casey would be the head football coach for George Fox University until his retirement from coaching at the end of the 2024 season.

== Personal life ==
Casey's brother, Pat, was the head baseball coach for George Fox University and Oregon State University.

== Head coaching record ==
=== College ===
Year	Team	Overall	Conference	Standing	Bowl/playoffs
George Fox Bruins (Northwest Conference) (2014–present)
2014	George Fox	1–8	1–6	7th	
2015	George Fox	4–6	2–5	T–5th	
2016	George Fox	5–4	5–2	3rd	
2017	George Fox	7–3	5–2	T–2nd	
2018	George Fox	6–4	4–3	T–3rd	
2019	George Fox	5–5	4–3	T–3rd	
2020–21	George Fox	1–1	1–1	T–3rd	
2021	George Fox	6–3	6–1	2nd	
2022	George Fox	8–2	5–2	T–2nd	
2023	George Fox	4–6	3–4	5th	
2024	George Fox	4–6	2–5	6th	
George Fox:		51–48	38–34		
Total:		51–48			

=== High school ===
Year	Team	Overall	Conference	Standing	Bowl/playoffs
Aloha Warriors () (2004–2012)
2004	Aloha	2–7	2–7	8th	
2005	Aloha	4–5	4–5	6th	
2006	Aloha	4–5	0–5	6th	
2007	Aloha	4–5	0–5	6th	
2008	Aloha	2–7	0–5	6th	
2009	Aloha	7–4	3–2	3rd	
2010	Aloha	13–1	5–0	1st	
2011	Aloha	5–6	2–3	3rd	
2012	Aloha	8–3	3–2	3rd	
Aloha:		49–43	19–34		
Total:		49–43			
National championship Conference title Conference division title or championship game berth
