= Mike Turk =

American football quarterback and football coach

Current position
- Title: Head coach
- Team: Huntingdon
- Conference: USA South
- Record: 158–72

Playing career
- 1984–1987: Troy State
- Position: Quarterback

Coaching career (HC unless noted)
- 1991–2003: Troy State (assistant)
- 2004–present: Huntingdon

Administrative career (AD unless noted)
- 2013–2019: Huntingdon
- 2019–present: Huntingdon (associate AD)

Head coaching record
- Overall: 158–72
- Tournaments: 2–8 (NCAA D-III playoffs)

Accomplishments and honors

Championships
- 7 USA South (2015–2017, 2019, 2021, 2022, 2026)

Awards
- GSC Freshman of the Year (1984); 3× First-team All-Gulf South (1985-1987); 2x Gulf South Offensive Player of the Year (1986, 1987); 4× USA South Coach of the Year (2015–2017, 2019, 2022); Troy Sports Hall of Fame (2012); D-II Football Hall of Fame (2007)

Mike Turk is an American college football coach and former player. He is the head football coach for Huntingdon College, a position he has held since 2004. From 2003 to 2019, he was also the athletic director at Huntingdon. As a college football player, he was a quarterback for two NCAA Division II Football Championship-winning teams at Troy State University—now known as Troy University—in Troy, Alabama, in 1984 and 1987.

== Head coaching record ==
Year	Team	Overall	Conference	Standing	Bowl/playoffs	D3^{#}
Huntingdon Hawks (NCAA Division III independent) (2004–2007)
2004	Huntingdon	4–5				
2005	Huntingdon	7–2				
2006	Huntingdon	6–4				
2007	Huntingdon	5–5				
Huntingdon Hawks (St. Louis Intercollegiate Athletic Conference) (2008)
2008	Huntingdon	8–2	6–1	2nd		
Huntingdon Hawks (NCAA Division III independent) (2009–2012)
2009	Huntingdon	8–3			L NCAA Division III First Round	
2010	Huntingdon	6–4				
2011	Huntingdon	7–3				
2012	Huntingdon	6–3				
Huntingdon Hawks (USA South Athletic Conference) (2013–present)
2013	Huntingdon	7–3	5–2	T–3rd		
2014	Huntingdon	7–3	6–2	T–2nd		
2015	Huntingdon	10–2	7–0	1st	L NCAA Division III Second Round	25
2016	Huntingdon	9–2	6–1	T–1st	L NCAA Division III First Round	
2017	Huntingdon	9–2	7–0	1st	L NCAA Division III First Round	
2018	Huntingdon	4–5	4–3	T–3rd		
2019	Huntingdon	8–4	6–1	1st	L NCAA Division III Second Round	
2020–21	Huntingdon	3–1	2–1	T–2nd		
2021	Huntingdon	8–3	8–0	1st	L NCAA Division III First Round	
2022	Huntingdon	9–2	7–0	1st	L NCAA Division III First Round	24
2023	Huntingdon	8–2	6–1	2nd		
2024	Huntingdon	5–5	5–3	T–4th		
2025	Huntingdon	6–4	5–2	T–2nd		
2026	Huntingdon	8–3	7–0	1st	L NCAA Division III First Round	
Huntingdon:		158–72	87–17			
Total:		158–72				
National championship Conference title Conference division title or championship game berth
