= Jerry Louthan =

American athletic director and athletics coach (1938–2020)

Biographical details
- Born: March 31, 1938; Houston, Texas, U.S.
- Died: August 13, 2020 (aged 82)

Playing career

Football
- 1957–1958: Friends
- 1959–1961: Pittsburg State
- Positions: Defensive back, fullback

Coaching career (HC unless noted)

Football
- 1962–1963: Lockwood HS (MO)
- 1964–1965: Friends (assistant)
- 1966: George Fox (assistant)
- 1967: George Fox

Basketball
- 1966–1969: George Fox (assistant)

Baseball
- 1966–1969: George Fox

Track and field
- 1966–1969: George Fox

Administrative career (AD unless noted)
- 1964–1965: Friends
- 1966–1969: George Fox

Head coaching record
- Overall: 0–8 (college football)

Jerald David Louthan (March 31, 1938 – August 13, 2020) was an American college football coach. He was the athletic director and head football coach for George Fox College—now known as George Fox University.

== Career ==
Louthan played college football for Friends and Pittsburg State as a defensive back and fullback.

In 1962, following Louthan's playing career he was named head football coach for Lockwood High School. In 1964, he became the athletic director and an assistant coach for Friends. In 1966, he joined George Fox as an assistant football and basketball coach and the head track and field coach. In 1967, he was promoted to head football coach and was named athletic director following Earl Craven's departure. In one season as head coach he led the team to a 0–8 record which was their last fielded team until 2014. He also coached the baseball team until 1969.

As athletic director, he suspended the football team.

== Head coaching record ==
=== College football ===
Year	Team	Overall	Conference	Standing	Bowl/playoffs
George Fox Quakers (Oregon Collegiate Conference) (1968)
1968	George Fox	0–8	0–4	5th	
George Fox:		0–8	0–4		
Total:		0–8			
