= Huntingdon Hawks =

- University: Huntingdon College
- Nickname: Hawks
- NCAA: NCAA Division III
- Conference: Collegiate Conference of the South
- Location: Montgomery, Alabama
- Football stadium: Charles Lee Field
- Colors: Scarlet and pearl gray
- Website: https://huntingdonhawks.com/
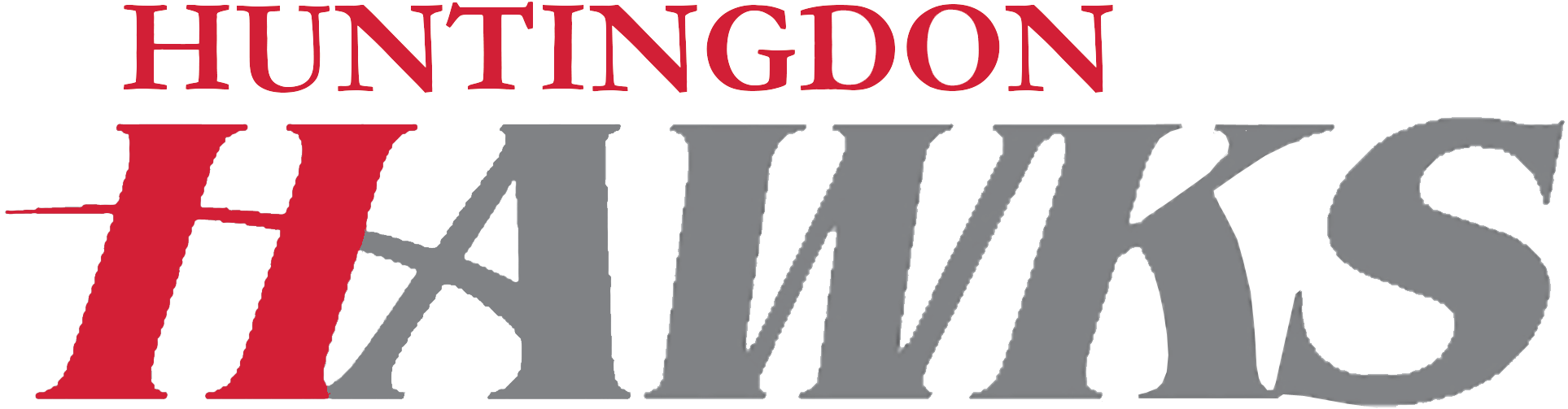

The Huntingdon Hawks are the athletic teams of Huntingdon College in Montgomery, Alabama. It is the only NCAA Division III school located in the U.S. state of Alabama. The team currently competes in the Collegiate Conference of the South, having joined in 2022.

== History ==
The team competed in the Great South Athletic Conference from 2002 to 2011. They then competed as an independent in the 2012–2013 season. In May 2012, it was announced that they would join the USA South Athletic Conference, where they have competed ever since.

Mike Turk served as the athletic director from 2013–2019. Eric Levanda has been the athletic director since 2019.

== Varsity sports ==
Men's sports	Women's sports
Baseball	Basketball
Basketball	Beach volleyball
Cross country	Cross country
Football	Flag football
Golf	Golf
Lacrosse	Lacrosse
Soccer	Soccer
Tennis	Softball
Track and field	Tennis
Wrestling	Track and field
	Volleyball
	Wrestling

=== Baseball ===
The Huntingdon Hawks baseball team began NCAA play in 2002. D.J. Conville is the current head coach.

=== Football ===
The Huntingdon Hawks football team began play in 2003, coached by Duane Trogdon. Mike Turk has been the head coach since 2004.
