= 2016 Little All-America college football team =

The 2016 Little All-America college football team is composed of college football players from Division II, III, and NAIA schools who were selected by the Associated Press (AP) as the best players at each position.

== First team ==
Position	Player	Team
Offense
Quarterback	Justin Dvorak	Colorado School of Mines
Running back	Marty Carter	Grand Valley State
Running back	Trevor Heitland	Coe
Wide receiver	Garry Brown	California (Pa.)
Wide receiver	Matt Heller	Augustana
Wide receiver	Koree Reed	Hartwick
Offensive line	Jordan Morgan	Kutztown
Offensive line	Zach Voytek	New Haven
Offensive line	Nate Theaker	Wayne State
Offensive line	Peter Bateman	Minnesota Duluth
Offensive line	Brooks Jenkins	Mount Union
Defense
Defensive line	John Flood	Wisconsin–Whitewater
Defensive line	Lucky Baar	McKendree
Defensive line	Sie Doe Jr.	Fort Hays State
Defensive line	Collin Bevins	Northwest Missouri State
Linebacker	Carter Hanson	St. John's (MN)
Linebacker	Osband Thompson	Tuskegee
Linebacker	Tyke Kozeal	Nebraska–Kearney
Defensive back	Baylor Mullins	Mary Hardin-Baylor
Defensive back	Philbert Martial	North Alabama
Defensive back	Matt McKoy	Saginaw Valley State
Defensive back	Drew Hebel	Black Hills State
Special Teams
Kicker	Matt Davis	UNC Pembroke
Punter	Aaron LaDeaux	Minot State
All-purpose	Keelan Cole	Kentucky Wesleyan

== See also ==
- 2016 College Football All-America Team
