= Earl Craven =

American football player and coach (1922–2000)

Biographical details
- Born: November 24, 1922; Beaver, Kansas, U.S.
- Died: July 27, 2000 (aged 77); Newberg, Oregon, U.S.

Playing career

Football
- late 1940s: Pacific College

Coaching career (HC unless noted)

Football
- 1949–1954: Friends
- 1955–1957: Taylor
- 1958–1962: William Penn
- 1963–1966: George Fox

Basketball
- 1947–1948: George Fox
- 1958–1959: William Penn

Administrative career (AD unless noted)
- 1958–1963: William Penn
- 1963–1967: George Fox

Head coaching record
- Overall: 8–37 (basketball)

Earl Leonard Craven (November 24, 1922 – July 27, 2000) was an American football and basketball coach and college athletics administrator in the United States. He was president of the NAIA Coaches Association from 1957 through 1959. He also initiated a nationwide appeal to cease marketing efforts of alcoholic beverages at college sports events and campuses.

== Playing career ==
Craven entered Pacific College (now called George Fox University) in Newberg, Oregon during the fall of 1941. His time in college was interrupted by military service in World War II from 1943 to 1946, but he returned to Pacific and was awarded letters in basketball, baseball and football. Craven earned a degree in psychology and education in 1949.

== Coaching career ==
=== Taylor ===
Craven was named the head coach at Taylor University in Upland, Indiana beginning with the 1955 season.

=== William Penn ===
In 1958, Craven was hired as the head football coach and athletic director at William Penn College—now known as William Penn University—in Oskaloosa, Iowa. William Penn athletics had been in a slump for 20 years. Craven worked to boost attendance and improve the program. Craven's first football team at William Penn recorded the most wins in a single season to date and ended with a record of 7–2, including the program's first win over the Central Dutch in 20 years. His record at the school was 26–18–2.

=== George Fox ===
In February, 1963, Craven was appointed athletic director and director of admissions at George Fox University. He resigned as athletic and head football coach at George Fox in 1967 to become director of physical education at Clatsop Community College.

== Head coaching record ==
=== Football ===
Year	Team	Overall	Conference	Standing	Bowl/playoffs
Friends Quakers (Independent) (1949–1954)
1949	Friends	4–0			
1950	Friends	3–2			
1951	Friends	2–5			
1952	Friends	2–5			
1953	Friends	4–5			
1954	Friends	1–8			
Friends:		16–25			
Taylor Trojans (Hoosier Conference) (1955–1957)
1955	Taylor	2–6	1–5	7th	
1956	Taylor	3–6	1–5	6th	
1957	Taylor	7–1–1	3–1–1	3rd	
Taylor:		12–13–1	5–11–1		
William Penn Quakers/Statesmen (NAIA independent) (1958–1962)
1958	William Penn	7–2			
1959	William Penn	7–3			
1960	William Penn	4–5			
1961	William Penn	3–5–1			
1962	William Penn	5–3–1			
William Penn:		26–18–2			
George Fox Quakers (NAIA independent) (1963–1964)
1963	George Fox				
1964	George Fox				
George Fox Quakers (Oregon Collegiate Conference) (1965–1966)
1965	George Fox	0–8	0–4	5th	
1966	George Fox	1–6	0–4	5th	
George Fox:			0–8		
Total:					
