= 2017 Wartburg Knights football team =

American college football season

2017 Wartburg Knights football

IIAC champion

NCAA Division III Quarterfinal, L 27–41 at Wisconsin–Oshkosh
- Conference: Iowa Intercollegiate Athletic Conference

Ranking
- AFCA: No. 8
- D3Football.com: No. 10
- Record: 12–1 (8–0 IIAC)
- Head coach: Rick Willis (19th season)
- Offensive coordinator: Matt Wheeler (8th season)
- Defensive coordinator: Chris Winter (7th season)
- Home stadium: Walston-Hoover Stadium

2017 Iowa Intercollegiate Athletic Conference football standings
	Conf.			Overall
Team	W		L	W		L
No. 10 Wartburg $^	8	–	0	12	–	1
Central (IA)	6	–	2	7	–	3
Luther	5	–	3	6	–	4
Dubuque	4	–	4	6	–	4
Simpson (IA)	4	–	4	5	–	5
Loras	3	–	5	4	–	6
Coe	2	–	6	4	–	6
Buena Vista	2	–	6	2	–	7
Nebraska Wesleyan	2	–	6	2	–	8
$ – Conference champion; ^ – NCAA Division III playoff participant; Rankings from D3football.com

The 2017 Wartburg Knights football team represented Wartburg College as a member of the Iowa Intercollegiate Athletic Conference (IIAC) during the 2017 NCAA Division III football season. Led by Rick Willis in his 19th season as head coach, the Knights compiled an overall record of 12–1 with a mark of 8–0 in conference play, winning IIAC title for the first time since 2014 and earning an automatic bid to the NCAA Division III Football Championship playoffs. Wartburg lost in the quarterfinal round of the playoffs to the Wisconsin–Oshkosh. The team played home games at Walston-Hoover Stadium in Waverly, Iowa.

== Schedule ==
Wartburg's 2017 regular season scheduled consisted of six home and four away games.

Date	Time	Opponent	Rank	Site	Result	Attendance
September 9	1:00 p.m.	Monmouth (IL)*		Walston-Hoover Stadium; Waverly, IA	W 36–13	3,451
September 16	1:00 p.m.	Simpson		Buxton Stadium; Indianola, IA	W 40–31	3,100
September 9	1:00 p.m.	Washington University*		Walston-Hoover Stadium; Waverly, IA	W 30–20	3,000
September 30	1:00 p.m.	Coe		Walston-Hoover Stadium; Waverly, IA	W 34–7	4,112
October 7	1:00 p.m.	at Central (IA)		Schipper Stadium; Pella, IA	W 44–20	1,500
October 14	12:30 p.m.	Loras^{†}	No. 22	Walston-Hoover Stadium; Waverly, IA	W 42–11	4,500
October 21	12:00 p.m.	at Luther	No. 20	Carlson Stadium; Decorah, IA	W 41–16	1,850
October 28	1:00 p.m.	Dubuque	No. 19	Walston-Hoover Stadium; Waverly, IA	W 23–0	1,957
November 4	1:00 p.m.	at Buena Vista	No. 18	J. Leslie Rollins; Storm Lake, IA	W 56–14	1,230
November 11	1:00 p.m.	Nebraska Wesleyan	No. 18	Walston-Hoover Stadium; Waverly, IA	W 41–20	1,950
November 18	12:00 p.m.	Franklin*	No. 17	Walston-Hoover Stadium; Waverly, IA (NCAA Division III First Round)	W 35–34	2,008
November 25	12:00 p.m.	No. 25 Trine*	No. 17	Walston-Hoover Stadium; Waverly, IA (NCAA Division III Second Round)	W 49–7	2,500
November 25	12:00 p.m.	at No. 3 Wisconsin–Oshkosh*	No. 17	J. J. Keller Field; Oshkosh, WI (NCAA Division III Quarterfinal)	L 27–41	1,902
*Non-conference game; ^{†}Homecoming; Rankings from D3Football.com Poll released prior to the game; All times are in Central time

== Awards and honors ==
Individual awards
Player	Award
Matt Sacia	Gagliardi Trophy Finalist; IIAC Offensive Player of the year
Derek Schipper	D3football.com First-team All-American; AFCA First-team All-American
Riley Brockway	D3football.com Second-team All-American; AP Second-team All-American
Coach	Award
Rick Willis	IIAC Coach of the year AFCA Region 5 Coach of the year

All-Conference
Player	Position	Team	Year
JoJo McNair	DB	1	Fr
Dillon Rademaker	DL	1	SR
Rob Rottler	LB	1	SR
Tony Anstoetter	LB	1	SR
Matt Sacia	QB	1	JR
Derek Shipper	OL	1	SR
Riley Brockway	WR	1	SR
Peyton Imhoff	DB	2	JR
Troy Heick	DL	2	SR
Hudson Johnston	OL	2	SR
Dylan Binion	RB	2	So
Jake Pisarik	P	2	Sr
Chris McNutt	DB	HM	Sr
Tyler Schager	OL	HM	Jr
Tom Schiffer	OL	HM	Sr
Griffin Brennecke	WR	HM	Sr
JoJo McNair	RS	HM	Fr
HM = Honorable mention. Reference:
