= 2017 Mount Union Purple Raiders football team =

American college football season

2017 Mount Union Purple Raiders football

NCAA Division III champion OAC champion

Stagg Bowl, W 12–0 vs. Mary Hardin–Baylor
- Conference: Ohio Athletic Conference

Ranking
- D3Football.com: No. 1
- Record: 15–0 (9–0 OAC)
- Head coach: Vince Kehres (5th season)
- Offensive coordinator: Chris Kappas (1st season)
- Home stadium: Mount Union Stadium

2017 Ohio Athletic Conference football standings
	Conf.			Overall
Team	W		L	W		L
No. 1 Mount Union $^	9	–	0	15	–	0
Heidelberg	6	–	3	7	–	3
Ohio Northern	6	–	3	7	–	3
John Carroll	6	–	3	6	–	4
Baldwin Wallace	5	–	4	6	–	4
Marietta	5	–	4	6	–	4
Otterbein	5	–	4	6	–	4
Muskingum	1	–	8	2	–	8
Wilmington (OH)	1	–	8	2	–	8
Capital	1	–	8	1	–	9
$ – Conference champion; ^ – NCAA Division III playoff participant; Rankings from D3football.com

The 2017 Mount Union Purple Raiders football team represented the University of Mount Union in the 2017 NCAA Division III football season. The Purple Raiders, led by fifth-year head coach Vince Kehres, were members of the Ohio Athletic Conference (OAC) and played their home games at Mount Union Stadium in Alliance, Ohio.

== Schedule ==
Mount Union's 2017 schedule consists of 6 home, and 4 away games in the regular season. The Raiders hosted N.C. Wesleyan, Baldwin Wallace, Ohio Northern, Capital University, Otterbein University, and Muskingum University and traveled to Marietta College, Heidelberg University, Wilmington College, and John Carroll University.

Mount Union had one non–conference game against North Carolina Wesleyan College from the USA South Athletic Conference.

In 2016, Mount Union did not make it to the Stagg Bowl for the first time in eleven years after losing to Mary Hardin-Baylor in the semifinals 14–12. The team finished with a 12–2 record, with an 8–1 record in conference play.

The Purple Raiders ended their season by going to the Stagg Bowl and winning the NCAA Division III National Championship with a 12–0 win over Mary Hardin-Baylor of Texas.

Date	Time	Opponent	Rank	Site	TV	Result	Attendance
September 2	12:00 pm	North Carolina Wesleyan*	No. 2	Mount Union Stadium; Alliance, OH	SportsTime Ohio	W 58–0	2,533
September 16	1:30 pm	at Marietta	No. 2	Don Drumm Stadium; Marietta, OH		W 69–3	3,142
September 23	1:30 pm	Baldwin Wallace	No. 2	Mount Union Stadium; Alliance, OH	SportsTime Ohio	W 55–7	2,917
September 30	1:30 pm	Ohio Northern^{†}	No. 2	Mount Union Stadium; Alliance, OH	SportsTime Ohio	W 43–14	3,028
October 7	1:30 pm	at No. 21 Heidelberg	No. 2	Hoernemann Stadium; Tiffin, OH		W 63–7	2,064
October 14	1:30 pm	Capital	No. 2	Mount Union Stadium; Alliance, OH	SportsTime Ohio	W 72–14	1,973
October 21	1:30 pm	at Wilmington	No. 2	Williams Stadium; Wilmington, OH		W 66–7	2,310
October 28	1:30 pm	Otterbein	No. 2	Mount Union Stadium; Alliance, OH		W 51–14	1,846
November 4	1:00 pm	Muskingum	No. 2	Mount Union Stadium; Alliance, OH		W 59–7	1,948
November 11	1:30 pm	at John Carroll	No. 2	Don Shula Stadium; University Heights, OH		W 31–27	3,444
November 18	12:00 pm	Washington and Lee*	No. 2	Mount Union Stadium; Alliance, OH (NCAA Division III First Round)		W 21–0	1,534
November 25	12:00 pm	No. 16 Case Western Reserve*	No. 2	Mount Union Stadium; Alliance, OH (NCAA Division III Second Round)		W 45–16	1,763
December 2	12:00 pm	No. 15 Frostburg State*	No. 2	Mount Union Stadium (NCAA Division III Quarterfinal)		W 70–37	1,863
December 9	1:05 pm	at No. 3 Wisconsin–Oshkosh*	No. 2	Titan Stadium; Oshkosh, WI (NCAA Division III Semifinal)	ESPN3	W 43–40	1,667
December 15	7:00 pm	vs. No. 1 Mary Hardin–Baylor*	No. 2	Salem Football Stadium; Salem, VA (Stagg Bowl)	ESPNU	W 12–0	4,971
*Non-conference game; ^{†}Homecoming; Rankings from D3football.com Poll released prior to the game; All times are in Eastern time
