= 2017 Case Western Reserve Spartans football team =

American college football season

2017 Case Western Reserve Spartans football

PAC champion

NCAA Division III Second Round, L 16–45 at Mount Union
- Conference: Presidents' Athletic Conference

Ranking
- D3Football.com: No. 13
- Record: 11–1 (8–0 PAC)
- Head coach: Greg Debeljak (14th season)
- Home stadium: DiSanto Field

2017 Presidents' Athletic Conference football standings
	Conf.			Overall
Team	W		L	W		L
No. 13 Case Western Reserve +^	8	–	0	11	–	1
No. 16 Washington & Jefferson +^	8	–	0	11	–	1
Westminster (PA)	6	–	2	7	–	3
Carnegie Mellon	5	–	3	7	–	4
Thomas More	5	–	3	6	–	4
Grove City	4	–	4	4	–	6
Geneva	2	–	6	3	–	7
Bethany (WV)	2	–	6	2	–	8
Waynesburg	2	–	6	2	–	8
Saint Vincent	1	–	7	2	–	8
Thiel	1	–	7	1	–	9
+ – Conference co-champions; ^ – NCAA Division III playoff participant; Rankings from D3football.com

The 2017 Case Western Reserve Spartans football team represented Case Western Reserve University as a member of the Presidents' Athletic Conference (PAC) during the 2017 NCAA Division III football season. The team was coached by 14th-year head coach Greg Debeljak and played its home games at DiSanto Field in Cleveland. The Spartans won both the PAC at 8–0 and the University Athletic Association (UAA) at 2–0, finishing the regular season an undefeated 10–0.

In first round of the NCAA Division III Football Championship playoffs, the Spartans shut out the Illinois Wesleyan, 28–0 in a game with heavy snow. In second round, Case Western Reserve was defeated by the eventual national champion, Mount Union.

== Schedule ==
Date	Time	Opponent	Rank	Site	Result	Attendance	Source
September 2	1:00 pm	at Chicago*	No. 22	Stagg Field; Chicago, IL	W 34–14	1,085	
September 16	7:00 pm	Grove City	No. 17	DiSanto Field; Cleveland, OH	W 42–10	2,238	
September 23	7:00 pm	Waynesburg	No. 18	DiSanto Field; Cleveland, OH	W 59–21	1,727	
September 30	1:00 pm	at Saint Vincent	No. 18	Chuck Noll Stadium; Latrobe, PA	W 35–14	2,476	
October 7	1:00 pm	Bethany (WV)^{†}	No. 17	DiSanto Field; Cleveland, OH	W 33–3	1,738	
October 14	3:00 pm	at Thiel	No. 16	Alumni Stadium; Greenville, PA	W 63–28	1,276	
October 21	7:00 pm	at Geneva	No. 17	Reeves Field; Beaver Falls, PA	W 45–7	3,427	
October 28	12:00 pm	Washington University*	No. 17	DiSanto Field; Cleveland, OH	W 45–28	1,342	
November 4	1:00 pm	Westminster (PA)	No. 16	DiSanto Field; Cleveland, OH	W 41–10	1,716	
November 11	2:00 pm	at Carnegie Mellon	No. 11	Gesling Stadium; Pittsburgh, PA (Academic Bowl)	W 41–34	3,441	
November 18	1:00 pm	at No. 11 Illinois Wesleyan*	No. 16	Tucci Stadium; Bloomington, IL (NCAA Division III First Round)	W 28–0	500	
November 25	12:00 pm	at No. 2 Mount Union*	No. 16	Mount Union Stadium; Alliance, OH (NCAA Division III Second Round)	L 16–45	1,763	
*Non-conference game; ^{†}Homecoming; Rankings from D3Football.com Poll released prior to the game; All times are in Eastern time
