= 2016 Case Western Reserve Spartans football team =

American college football season

2016 Case Western Reserve Spartans football
- Conference: Presidents' Athletic Conference
- Record: 9–1 (7–1 PAC)
- Head coach: Greg Debeljak (13th season)
- Home stadium: DiSanto Field

2016 Presidents' Athletic Conference football standings
| | Conf. | | | Overall |
| Team | W | | L | W | | L |
|---|---|---|---|---|---|---|
| No. 18 Thomas More $^ | 8 | – | 0 | 9 | – | 2 |
| Case Western Reserve | 7 | – | 1 | 9 | – | 1 |
| Washington & Jefferson | 6 | – | 2 | 9 | – | 2 |
| Carnegie Mellon | 6 | – | 2 | 7 | – | 4 |
| Westminster (PA) | 5 | – | 3 | 8 | – | 3 |
| Saint Vincent | 3 | – | 5 | 5 | – | 5 |
| Thiel | 3 | – | 5 | 4 | – | 6 |
| Bethany (WV) | 2 | – | 6 | 3 | – | 7 |
| Geneva | 2 | – | 6 | 3 | – | 7 |
| Waynesburg | 2 | – | 6 | 2 | – | 8 |
| Grove City | 0 | – | 8 | 0 | – | 10 |
$ – Conference champion; ^ – NCAA Division III playoff participant; Rankings from D3football.com

The 2016 Case Western Reserve Spartans football team represented Case Western Reserve University as a member of the Presidents' Athletic Conference (PAC) during the 2016 NCAA Division III football season. The team was coached by 13th-year coach Greg Debeljak and played its home games at DiSanto Field in Cleveland. The Spartans finished second in the PAC with a 7–1 record and tied for first in the University Athletic Association (UAA) with a 2–1 record.

== Schedule ==
| Date | Time | Opponent | Site | Result | Attendance | Source |
|---|---|---|---|---|---|---|
| September 3 | 11:00 am | Chicago* | DiSanto Field; Cleveland, OH | W 45–17 | 1,762 | |
| September 17 | 7:00 pm | at Grove City | Robert E. Thorn Field; Grove City, PA | W 55–0 | 2,000 | |
| September 24 | 1:30 pm | at Waynesburg | John F. Wiley Stadium; Waynesburg, PA | W 35–7 | 600 | |
| October 1 | 6:00 pm | Saint Vincent | DiSanto Field; Cleveland, OH | W 53–28 | 1,565 | |
| October 8 | 2:00 pm | at Bethany (WV) | Bison Stadium; Bethany, WV | W 37–14 | 1,274 | |
| October 15 | 1:00 pm | Thiel^{†} | DiSanto Field; Cleveland, OH | W 48–21 | 2,133 | |
| October 22 | 6:00 pm | Geneva | DiSanto Field; Cleveland, OH | W 16–14 | 1,124 | |
| October 29 | 1:00 pm | at Washington University* | Francis Field; St. Louis, MO | W 56–38 | 2,023 | |
| November 5 | 1:00 pm | at Westminster (PA) | Memorial; New Wilmington, PA | W 26–22 | 1,145 | |
| November 12 | 2:00 pm | Carnegie Mellon | DiSanto Field; Cleveland, OH (Academic Bowl) | L 21–26 | 1,946 | |
*Non-conference game; ^{†}Homecoming; All times are in Eastern time
