= 2016 Wisconsin–Whitewater Warhawks football team =

American college football season

2016 Wisconsin–Whitewater Warhawks football

WIAC champion

NCAA Division III Quarterfinal, L 14–31 vs. John Carroll
- Conference: Wisconsin Intercollegiate Athletic Conference

Ranking
- D3Football.com: No. 5
- Record: 12–1 (7–0 WIAC)
- Head coach: Kevin Bullis (2nd season)
- Defensive coordinator: Rob Erickson (2nd season)
- Home stadium: Perkins Stadium

2016 Wisconsin Intercollegiate Athletic Conference football standings
	Conf.			Overall
Team	W		L	W		L
No. 5 Wisconsin–Whitewater $^	7	–	0	12	–	1
No. 2 Wisconsin–Oshkosh ^	6	–	1	13	–	2
No. 14 Wisconsin–Platteville ^	5	–	2	8	–	3
Wisconsin–Stevens Point	3	–	4	6	–	4
Wisconsin–River Falls	3	–	4	4	–	6
Wisconsin–La Crosse	2	–	5	5	–	5
Wisconsin–Stout	1	–	6	3	–	7
Wisconsin–Eau Claire	1	–	6	2	–	8
$ – Conference champion; ^ – NCAA Division III playoff participant; Rankings from D3football.com

The 2016 Wisconsin–Whitewater Warhawks football team was an American football team that represented the University of Wisconsin–Whitewater as a member of the Wisconsin Intercollegiate Athletic Conference (WIAC) during the 2016 NCAA Division III football season. Led by second-year head coach Kevin Bullis, the Warhawks compiled an overall record of 12–1 and a mark of 7–1 in conference play, winning the WIAC title. They advanced to the playoffs NCAA Division III Football Championship, losing in the quarterfinals to John Carroll.

== Schedule ==
Date	Time	Opponent	Rank	Site	Result	Attendance	Source
September 3	12:00 p.m.	TCNJ*	No. 3	Perkins Stadium; Whitewater, WI	W 51–3	3,587	
September 10	1:00 p.m.	Belhaven*	No. 2	Perkins Stadium; Whitewater, WI	W 59–13	4,554	
September 24	1:00 p.m.	Morningside*	No. 2	Perkins Stadium; Whitewater, WI	W 35–21	6,205	
October 1	1:00 p.m.	at No. 8 Wisconsin–Platteville	No. 2	Ralph E. Davis Pioneer Stadium; Platteville, WI	W 30–24	4,289	
October 8	1:00 p.m.	No. 5 Wisconsin–Oshkosh	No. 2	Perkins Stadium; Whitewater, WI	W 17–14	17,535	
October 15	1:00 p.m.	at Wisconsin–La Crosse	No. 2	Veterans Memorial Stadium; La Crosse, WI	W 32–22	5,373	
October 22	1:00 p.m.	Wisconsin–Stevens Point^{†}	No. 2	Perkins Stadium; Whitewater, WI	W 24–2	10,364	
October 29	1:00 p.m.	at Wisconsin–Eau Claire	No. 2	Carson Park; Eau Claire, WI	W 48–6	3,842	
November 5	2:00 p.m.	Wisconsin–River Falls	No. 2	Perkins Stadium; Whitewater, WI	W 27–20 ^{OT}	5,764	
November 12	2:00 p.m.	at Wisconsin–Stout	No. 3	Don and Nona Williams Stadium; Menomonie, WI	W 34–16	632	
November 19	12:00 p.m.	Lakeland*	No. 2	Perkins Stadium; Whitewater, WI (NCAA Division III First Round)	W 45–27	1,000	
November 26	12:00 p.m.	No. 17 Wittenberg*	No. 2	Perkins Stadium; Whitewater, WI (NCAA Division III Second Round)	W 37–9	950	
December 3	12:00 p.m.	No. 6 John Carroll*	No. 2	Perkins Stadium; Whitewater, WI (NCAA Division III Quarterfinal)	L 14–31	1,500	
*Non-conference game; ^{†}Homecoming; Rankings from D3football.com Poll released prior to the game; All times are in Central time
