= George Fox Bruins football =

College football team

- First season: 1894; 132 years ago
- Athletic director: Adam Puckett
- Head coach: Spencer Crace; 1st season, 4–6 (.400)
- Location: Newberg, Oregon
- Stadium: Stoffer Family Stadium (capacity: 2,700)
- NCAA division: Division III
- Conference: NWC
- Colors: Navy blue and old gold
- All-time record: 55–54 (.505)
- Mascot: Bruins
- Website: athletics.georgefox.edu/football

The George Fox Bruins football team represents George Fox University in college football at the NCAA Division III level. The Bruins are members of the Northwest Conference (NWC), fielding its team in the NWC since 2014. The Bruins play their home games at the Stoffer Family Stadium in Newberg, Oregon.

== Conference affiliations ==
- Northwest Conference (2014–present)

== List of head coaches ==
=== Key ===
Key to symbols in coaches list
General		Overall		Conference		Postseason (Note: Although the first Rose Bowl Game was played in 1902, it has been continuously played since the 1916 game, and is recognized as the oldest bowl game by the NCAA. "—" indicates any season prior to 1916 when postseason games were not played.)	
No.	Order of coaches (Note: A running total of the number of head coaches, with coaches who served separate tenures being counted only once. Interim head coaches are represented with "Int" and are not counted in the running total. "—" indicates the team played but either without a coach or no coach is on record. "X" indicates an interim year without play.)	GC	Games coached	CW	Conference wins	PW	Postseason wins
DC	Division championships	OW	Overall wins	CL	Conference losses	PL	Postseason losses
CC	Conference championships	OL	Overall losses	CT	Conference ties	PT	Postseason ties
NC	National championships	OT	Overall ties (Note: Overtime rules in college football were introduced in 1996, making ties impossible in the period since.)	C%	Conference winning percentage		
†	Elected to the College Football Hall of Fame	O%	Overall winning percentage (Note: When computing the win–loss percentage, a tie counts as half a win and half a loss.)				

=== Coaches ===
List of head football coaches showing season(s) coached, overall records, conference records, postseason records, championships and selected awards
No.	Name	Season(s)	GC	OW	OL	OT	O%	CW	CL	CT	C%	PW	PL	PT	DC	CC	NC	Awards
1	Chris Casey	2014–2024	99	51	48	0	0.515	38	34	0	0.528	–	–	–	–	–	–	–
2	Spencer Crace	2025–present	10	4	6	0	0.400	4	3	0	0.571	–	–	–	–	–	–	–

== Year-by-year results ==
National champions	Conference champions	Bowl game berth	Playoff berth

Season	Year	Head Coach	Association	Division	Conference	Record							Postseason	Final ranking
Season	Year	Head Coach	Association	Division	Conference	Overall			Conference				Postseason	Final ranking
Season	Year	Head Coach	Association	Division	Conference	Win	Loss	Tie	Finish	Win	Loss	Tie	Postseason	Final ranking
George Fox Bruins
2014	2014	Chris Casey	NCAA	Division III	NWC	1	8	0	7th	1	6	0	—	—
2015	2015	Chris Casey	NCAA	Division III	NWC	4	6	0	5th	2	5	0	—	—
2016	2016	Chris Casey	NCAA	Division III	NWC	5	4	0	3rd	5	2	0	—	—
2017	2017	Chris Casey	NCAA	Division III	NWC	7	3	0	T–2nd	5	2	0	—	—
2018	2018	Chris Casey	NCAA	Division III	NWC	6	4	0	T–3rd	4	3	0	—	—
2019	2019	Chris Casey	NCAA	Division III	NWC	5	5	0	T–3rd	4	3	0	—	—
2020–21	2020–21	Chris Casey	NCAA	Division III	NWC	1	1	0	—	1	1	0	—	—
2021	2021	Chris Casey	NCAA	Division III	NWC	6	3	0	2nd	6	1	0	—	—
2022	2022	Chris Casey	NCAA	Division III	NWC	8	2	0	T–2nd	5	2	0	—	—
2023	2023	Chris Casey	NCAA	Division III	NWC	4	6	0	5th	3	4	0	—	—
2024	2024	Chris Casey	NCAA	Division III	NWC	4	6	0	6th	2	5	0	—	—
2025	2025	Spencer Crace	NCAA	Division III	NWC	4	6	0	4th	4	3	0	—	—
