= 2017 NCAA Division III football season =

American college football season

- Regular season: August 31 – November 11, 2017
- Playoffs: November 18 – December 15, 2017
- National championship: Salem Football Stadium; Salem, VA
- Champion: Mount Union
- Gagliardi Trophy: Brett Kasper (QB), Wisconsin–Oshkosh

The 2017 NCAA Division III football season was the portion of the 2017 college football season organized by the NCAA at the Division III level in the United States. Under Division III rules, teams were eligible to begin play on August 31, 2017. The season ended with the NCAA Division III Football Championship, also known as the Stagg Bowl, on December 15, 2017, at Salem Football Stadium in Salem, Virginia. Mount Union earned their 13th national title, defeating defending national champions Mary Hardin–Baylor.

== Conference and program changes ==
The 2017 season saw several significant changes to the landscape of Division III football:

- The New England Football Conference, a football-only league that had operated since 1965, became the football league of the all-sports Commonwealth Coast Conference (CCC), operating as Commonwealth Coast Football (CCC Football). The football league remains a separate entity from the overall conference.
- The New England Women's and Men's Athletic Conference began sponsoring football.
- The Southern Collegiate Athletic Conference, which had sponsored football since its creation in 1962 as the College Athletic Conference, ended sponsorship of football at the end of the 2016 season. The league had lost most of its membership when seven schools left in 2012 to form the Southern Athletic Association.
- The New England Small College Athletic Conference eliminated its members' annual pre-season scrimmages in favor of a 9th regular season game and ensuring all conference members play one another each season. Conference members remain ineligible for postseason tournament play.
- The Empire 8 and Liberty League announced on July 5 the creation of the New York State Bowl Game, which will feature the top two teams from each conference who failed to make the DIII tournament. It will be held immediately for the 2017 season, on November 18.
- Maranatha Baptist University announced that it would be dropping its football program on February 17. The school cited the resignation of coach Nate Spate, small roster numbers, and the struggle of filling a schedule as an independent all as factors in the decision.

School	2016 conference	2017 conference
Alfred State	Independent	ECFC
Austin	SCAC	SAA
Becker	ECFC	CCC Football
Brevard	SAC (D-II)	USA South
Catholic	ODAC	NEWMAC
Chicago	SAA & UAA	MWC
Coast Guard	NEFC	NEWMAC
Curry	NEFC	CCC Football
Dean	USCAA	ECFC
Endicott	NEFC	CCC Football
Maine Maritime	NEFC	NEWMAC
Maranatha Baptist	Independent	Dropped program
Merchant Marine	Liberty League	NEWMAC
MIT	NEFC	NEWMAC
Nichols	NEFC	CCC Football
Norwich	ECFC	NEWMAC
Salve Regina	NEFC	CCC Football
Springfield	Liberty League	NEWMAC
Southwestern	SCAC	ASC
Texas Lutheran	SCAC	ASC
Trinity (TX)	SCAC	SAA
Washington (MO)	SAA & UAA	UAA only
Western New England	NEFC	CCC Football
WPI	Liberty League	NEWMAC

A full list of Division III teams can be viewed on the D3football website.

== Conference standings ==
2017 American Southwest Conference football standings
	Conf.			Overall
Team	W		L	W		L
No. 2 Mary Hardin–Baylor $^	9	–	0	14	–	1
No. 11 Hardin–Simmons ^	8	–	1	9	–	2
East Texas Baptist	6	–	3	7	–	3
Southwestern (TX)	6	–	3	6	–	4
Texas Lutheran	6	–	3	6	–	4
Sul Ross	4	–	5	5	–	5
Louisiana College	2	–	7	3	–	7
McMurry #	2	–	7	2	–	8
Belhaven #	1	–	8	2	–	8
Howard Payne	1	–	8	1	–	9
$ – Conference champion; ^ – NCAA Division III playoff participant; # – Provisional NCAA Division III member; Rankings from D3football.com

2017 Centennial Conference football standings
	Conf.			Overall
Team	W		L	W		L
Franklin & Marshall +	8	–	1	10	–	1
No. 20 Johns Hopkins +^	8	–	1	9	–	2
Muhlenberg	6	–	3	8	–	3
Susquehanna	6	–	3	8	–	3
Ursinus	5	–	4	6	–	4
Dickinson	3	–	6	3	–	7
Gettysburg	3	–	6	3	–	7
Juniata	2	–	7	3	–	7
McDaniel	2	–	7	3	–	7
Moravian	2	–	7	2	–	8
+ – Conference co-champions; ^ – NCAA Division III playoff participant; Rankings from D3football.com

2017 College Conference of Illinois and Wisconsin football standings
	Conf.			Overall
Team	W		L	W		L
No. 8 North Central (IL) +^	7	–	1	10	–	2
No. 17 Illinois Wesleyan +^	7	–	1	9	–	2
No. 22 Wheaton (IL)	6	–	2	8	–	2
Carthage	5	–	3	7	–	3
Millikin	5	–	3	7	–	3
North Park	2	–	6	3	–	7
Elmhurst	2	–	6	2	–	8
Augustana (IL)	1	–	7	1	–	9
Carroll (WI)	1	–	7	1	–	9
+ – Conference co-champions; ^ – NCAA Division III playoff participant; Rankings from D3football.com

2017 Commonwealth Coast Conference football standings
	Conf.			Overall
Team	W		L	W		L
Western New England $^	5	–	0	8	–	3
Curry	4	–	1	8	–	3
Salve Regina	3	–	2	6	–	3
Endicott	2	–	3	3	–	7
Becker	1	–	4	1	–	9
Nichols	0	–	5	2	–	8
$ – Conference champion; ^ – NCAA Division III playoff participant

2017 Eastern Collegiate Football Conference standings
	Conf.			Overall
Team	W		L	W		L
No. 25 Husson $^	7	–	0	10	–	2
Maritime	6	–	1	9	–	2
Castleton	5	–	2	6	–	4
Mount Ida	3	–	4	4	–	6
Gallaudet	3	–	4	3	–	7
Dean #	2	–	5	4	–	6
Alfred State #	1	–	6	1	–	9
Anna Maria	1	–	6	1	–	9
$ – Conference champion; ^ – NCAA Division III playoff participant; # – Provisional Division III member; Rankings from D3football.com

2017 Empire 8 Athletic Conference football standings
	Conf.			Overall
Team	W		L	W		L
No. 5 Brockport $^	7	–	0	13	–	1
Alfred	5	–	2	8	–	3
Cortland	5	–	2	7	–	4
Buffalo State	3	–	4	6	–	5
Morrisville State	2	–	5	4	–	6
Hartwick	2	–	5	3	–	7
Utica	2	–	5	3	–	7
St. John Fisher	2	–	5	2	–	8
$ – Conference champion; ^ – NCAA Division III playoff participant; Rankings from AFCA Poll

2017 Heartland Collegiate Athletic Conference football standings
	Conf.			Overall
Team	W		L	W		L
No. 24 Franklin (IN) $^	8	–	0	8	–	3
Rose–Hulman	7	–	1	8	–	2
Manchester	5	–	3	6	–	4
Mount St. Joseph	5	–	3	6	–	4
Bluffton	4	–	4	4	–	6
Hanover	4	–	4	4	–	6
Defiance	2	–	6	2	–	8
Anderson (IN)	1	–	7	1	–	9
Earlham	0	–	8	0	–	10
$ – Conference champion; ^ – NCAA Division III playoff participant; Rankings from D3football.com

2017 Iowa Intercollegiate Athletic Conference football standings
	Conf.			Overall
Team	W		L	W		L
No. 10 Wartburg $^	8	–	0	12	–	1
Central (IA)	6	–	2	7	–	3
Luther	5	–	3	6	–	4
Dubuque	4	–	4	6	–	4
Simpson (IA)	4	–	4	5	–	5
Loras	3	–	5	4	–	6
Coe	2	–	6	4	–	6
Buena Vista	2	–	6	2	–	7
Nebraska Wesleyan	2	–	6	2	–	8
$ – Conference champion; ^ – NCAA Division III playoff participant; Rankings from D3football.com

2017 Liberty League football standings
	Conf.			Overall
Team	W		L	W		L
Ithaca +	4	–	1	8	–	3
RPI +^	4	–	1	8	–	3
Hobart	3	–	2	7	–	3
Union (NY)	3	–	2	7	–	4
St. Lawrence	1	–	4	2	–	8
Rochester (NY)	0	–	5	2	–	7
+ – Conference co-champions; ^ – NCAA Division III playoff participant

2017 Massachusetts State Collegiate Athletic Conference football standings
	Conf.			Overall
Team	W		L	W		L
Framingham State +	7	–	1	10	–	1
Plymouth State +^	7	–	1	9	–	2
Western Connecticut	5	–	3	7	–	3
Worcester State	5	–	3	6	–	4
UMass Dartmouth	4	–	4	4	–	6
Westfield State	3	–	5	3	–	7
Fitchburg State	2	–	6	3	–	7
Bridgewater State	2	–	6	2	–	8
Massachusetts Maritime	1	–	7	2	–	8
+ – Conference co-champions; ^ – NCAA Division III playoff participant

2017 Michigan Intercollegiate Athletic Association football standings
	Conf.			Overall
Team	W		L	W		L
No. 19 Trine $^	6	–	0	11	–	1
Hope	5	–	1	8	–	2
Adrian	4	–	2	5	–	5
Olivet	3	–	3	5	–	5
Albion	2	–	4	4	–	6
Alma	1	–	5	4	–	6
Kalamazoo	0	–	6	1	–	9
$ – Conference champion; ^ – NCAA Division III playoff participant; Rankings from D3football.com

2017 Middle Atlantic Conference football standings
	Conf.			Overall
Team	W		L	W		L
No. 7 Delaware Valley $^	9	–	0	12	–	1
Albright	7	–	2	8	–	3
Widener	7	–	2	7	–	4
Stevenson	6	–	3	6	–	5
Lebanon Valley	5	–	4	5	–	5
King's	4	–	5	5	–	5
Lycoming	4	–	5	5	–	6
FDU Florham	2	–	7	3	–	7
Misericordia	1	–	8	1	–	9
Wilkes	0	–	9	0	–	10
$ – Conference champion; ^ – NCAA Division III playoff participant; Rankings from D3football.com

2017 Midwest Conference football standings
	Conf.			Overall
Team	W		L	W		L
North
St. Norbert xy	5	–	0	7	–	3
Chicago	3	–	2	6	–	4
Macalester	3	–	2	5	–	5
Ripon	3	–	2	5	–	5
Lawrence	1	–	4	2	–	8
Beloit	0	–	5	1	–	9
South
Monmouth (IL) xy$^	5	–	0	9	–	2
Lake Forest	4	–	1	8	–	2
Illinois College	3	–	2	5	–	5
Cornell (IA)	2	–	3	4	–	6
Knox	1	–	4	5	–	5
Grinnell	0	–	5	1	–	9
Championship: Monmouth 9, St. Norbert 6
$ – Conference champion; x – Division champion/co-champions; y – Championship game participant; ^ – NCAA Division III playoff participant

2017 Minnesota Intercollegiate Athletic Conference football standings
	Conf.			Overall
Team	W		L	W		L
No. 4 St. Thomas (MN) $^	8	–	0	11	–	2
No. 14 Saint John's (MN) ^	7	–	1	9	–	2
No. 21 Concordia–Moorhead	6	–	2	8	–	2
Bethel (MN)	5	–	3	5	–	5
Gustavus Adolphus	4	–	4	5	–	5
St. Olaf	3	–	5	4	–	6
Augsburg	2	–	6	4	–	6
Hamline	1	–	7	2	–	8
Carleton	0	–	8	0	–	10
$ – Conference champion; ^ – NCAA Division III playoff participant; Rankings from D3football.com

2017 New England Small College Athletic Conference football standings
	Conf.			Overall
Team	W		L	W		L
Trinity (CT) $	8	–	1	8	–	1
Amherst	7	–	2	7	–	2
Middlebury	7	–	2	7	–	2
Wesleyan	6	–	3	6	–	3
Williams	6	–	3	6	–	3
Tufts	5	–	4	5	–	4
Hamilton	3	–	6	3	–	6
Bates	2	–	7	2	–	7
Colby	1	–	8	1	–	8
Bowdoin	0	–	9	0	–	9
$ – Conference champion

2017 New England Women's and Men's Athletic Conference football standings
	Conf.			Overall
Team	W		L	W		L
Springfield $^	7	–	0	10	–	1
WPI	6	–	1	9	–	2
MIT	5	–	2	7	–	3
Merchant Marine	4	–	3	6	–	4
Catholic University	3	–	4	5	–	5
Coast Guard	1	–	6	3	–	7
Maine Maritime	1	–	6	1	–	8
Norwich	1	–	6	1	–	9
$ – Conference champion; ^ – NCAA Division III playoff participant

2017 New Jersey Athletic Conference football standings
	Conf.			Overall
Team	W		L	W		L
No. 12 Wesley $^	9	–	0	10	–	2
No. 9 Frostburg State ^	8	–	1	11	–	2
Salisbury	7	–	2	7	–	4
Montclair State	5	–	4	5	–	5
Christopher Newport	4	–	5	5	–	5
Kean	4	–	5	4	–	6
TCNJ	4	–	5	4	–	6
Rowan	3	–	6	4	–	6
Southern Virginia	1	–	8	2	–	8
William Paterson	0	–	9	0	–	10
$ – Conference champion; ^ – NCAA Division III playoff participant; Rankings from D3football.com

2017 North Coast Athletic Conference football standings
	Conf.			Overall
Team	W		L	W		L
No. 18 Wittenberg $^	9	–	0	10	–	1
DePauw	7	–	2	8	–	2
Wabash	7	–	2	8	–	2
Denison	6	–	3	7	–	3
Wooster	5	–	4	6	–	4
Ohio Wesleyan	5	–	4	5	–	5
Oberlin	3	–	6	4	–	6
Allegheny	2	–	7	3	–	7
Hiram	1	–	8	2	–	8
Kenyon	0	–	9	0	–	10
$ – Conference champion; ^ – NCAA Division III playoff participant; Rankings from D3football.com

2017 Northern Athletics Collegiate Conference football standings
	Conf.			Overall
Team	W		L	W		L
Lakeland $^	6	–	0	8	–	3
Benedictine (IL)	5	–	1	7	–	3
Aurora	4	–	2	5	–	5
Wisconsin Lutheran	3	–	3	3	–	7
Concordia (IL)	1	–	5	3	–	6
Concordia (WI)	1	–	5	2	–	8
Rockford	1	–	5	1	–	8
$ – Conference champion; ^ – NCAA Division III playoff participant

2017 Northwest Conference football standings
	Conf.			Overall
Team	W		L	W		L
No. 6 Linfield $^	7	–	0	9	–	2
Whitworth	5	–	2	8	–	2
George Fox	5	–	2	7	–	3
Pacific (OR)	4	–	3	4	–	4
Pacific Lutheran	4	–	3	4	–	4
Puget Sound	2	–	5	3	–	6
Lewis & Clark	1	–	6	2	–	7
Willamette	0	–	7	0	–	9
$ – Conference champion; ^ – NCAA Division III playoff participant; Rankings from D3football.com

2017 Ohio Athletic Conference football standings
	Conf.			Overall
Team	W		L	W		L
No. 1 Mount Union $^	9	–	0	15	–	0
Heidelberg	6	–	3	7	–	3
Ohio Northern	6	–	3	7	–	3
John Carroll	6	–	3	6	–	4
Baldwin Wallace	5	–	4	6	–	4
Marietta	5	–	4	6	–	4
Otterbein	5	–	4	6	–	4
Muskingum	1	–	8	2	–	8
Wilmington (OH)	1	–	8	2	–	8
Capital	1	–	8	1	–	9
$ – Conference champion; ^ – NCAA Division III playoff participant; Rankings from D3football.com

2017 Old Dominion Athletic Conference football standings
	Conf.			Overall
Team	W		L	W		L
Washington and Lee $^	5	–	1	8	–	3
Randolph–Macon	4	–	2	7	–	3
Hampden–Sydney	4	–	2	6	–	4
Shenandoah	3	–	3	6	–	4
Guilford	3	–	3	5	–	5
Bridgewater	1	–	5	4	–	6
Emory & Henry	1	–	5	3	–	7
$ – Conference champion; ^ – NCAA Division III playoff participant

2017 Presidents' Athletic Conference football standings
	Conf.			Overall
Team	W		L	W		L
No. 13 Case Western Reserve +^	8	–	0	11	–	1
No. 16 Washington & Jefferson +^	8	–	0	11	–	1
Westminster (PA)	6	–	2	7	–	3
Carnegie Mellon	5	–	3	7	–	4
Thomas More	5	–	3	6	–	4
Grove City	4	–	4	4	–	6
Geneva	2	–	6	3	–	7
Bethany (WV)	2	–	6	2	–	8
Waynesburg	2	–	6	2	–	8
Saint Vincent	1	–	7	2	–	8
Thiel	1	–	7	1	–	9
+ – Conference co-champions; ^ – NCAA Division III playoff participant; Rankings from D3football.com

2017 Southern Athletic Association football standings
	Conf.			Overall
Team	W		L	W		L
No. 15 Berry $^	8	–	0	11	–	1
Centre	7	–	1	9	–	1
Hendrix	6	–	2	8	–	2
Trinity (TX)	5	–	3	6	–	4
Rhodes	3	–	5	4	–	6
Birmingham–Southern	2	–	6	3	–	7
Millsaps	2	–	6	3	–	7
Sewanee	2	–	6	3	–	7
Austin	1	–	7	3	–	7
$ – Conference champion; ^ – NCAA Division III playoff participant; Rankings from D3football.com

2017 Southern California Intercollegiate Athletic Conference football standings
	Conf.			Overall
Team	W		L	W		L
Chapman $^	6	–	0	6	–	3
Redlands	5	–	1	7	–	2
Cal Lutheran	3	–	3	5	–	3
Pomona–Pitzer	3	–	3	4	–	4
Claremont–Mudd–Scripps	2	–	4	4	–	5
La Verne	2	–	4	3	–	5
Whittier	0	–	6	0	–	8
Occidental *		–		0	–	3
$ – Conference champion; ^ – NCAA Division III playoff participant; * – Occidental canceled six games, and their remaining conference games were not counted in the standings.

2017 Upper Midwest Athletic Conference football standings
	Conf.			Overall
Team	W		L	W		L
Eureka $^	8	–	1	8	–	3
MacMurray	7	–	2	8	–	2
St. Scholastica	7	–	2	7	–	3
Northwestern (MN)	6	–	3	6	–	4
Westminster (MO)	6	–	3	6	–	4
Martin Luther	4	–	5	5	–	5
Greenville	4	–	5	4	–	6
Iowa Wesleyan #	2	–	7	2	–	8
Minnesota–Morris	1	–	8	1	–	9
Crown	0	–	9	0	–	10
$ – Conference champion; ^ – NCAA Division III playoff participant; # – Provisional NCAA Division III member

2017 USA South Athletic Conference football standings
	Conf.			Overall
Team	W		L	W		L
Huntingdon $^	7	–	0	9	–	2
Ferrum	5	–	2	8	–	2
Averett	5	–	2	6	–	4
Maryville (TN)	3	–	4	5	–	5
LaGrange	3	–	4	4	–	6
North Carolina Wesleyan	3	–	4	3	–	7
Methodist	2	–	5	2	–	8
Greensboro	0	–	7	1	–	9
$ – Conference champion; ^ – NCAA Division III playoff participant

2017 Wisconsin Intercollegiate Athletic Conference football standings
	Conf.			Overall
Team	W		L	W		L
No. 3 Wisconsin–Oshkosh $^	7	–	0	12	–	1
No. 23 Wisconsin–Whitewater	6	–	1	7	–	3
No. 24 Wisconsin–La Crosse	5	–	2	8	–	2
Wisconsin–Platteville	4	–	3	7	–	3
Wisconsin–Stout	3	–	4	5	–	4
Wisconsin–River Falls	2	–	5	4	–	6
Wisconsin–Stevens Point	1	–	6	4	–	6
Wisconsin–Eau Claire	0	–	7	1	–	9
$ – Conference champion; ^ – NCAA Division III playoff participant; Rankings from D3football.com

2017 NCAA Division III independents football records
	Conf.			Overall
Team	W		L	W		L
Brevard #		–		4	–	6
Finlandia		–		3	–	3
Washington University		–		3	–	6
# – Provisional Division III member

== Preseason ==
=== Overseas exhibition games ===
Because Division III football teams do not award scholarships, they are permitted by NCAA rules to occasionally travel outside the United States to tour and play exhibition matches. Several teams took off-season trips in late spring 2017 and played primarily non-college club teams, with the exception of Illinois Wesleyan, who played a Japanese college team. All of the games were won by the Division III schools, which are displayed in bold.

Date	Location	NCAA DIII Team	Hosting Team	Score
May 20, 2017	Milngavie, Scotland, UK	CMS	East Kilbride Pirates (BAFA Premier)	73–6
May 21, 2017	Ferrara, Italy	Southwestern	Ferrara Aquile (IFL)	94–0
May 21, 2017	Shanghai, China	Puget Sound	Shanghai Titans (AFCL)	84–6
May 27, 2017	Barcelona, Spain	John Carroll	Senior Spanish League All-Stars (LNFA)	91–7
May 27, 2017	Belfast, Northern Ireland, UK	Centre	Belfast Trojans (IAFL)	47–0
June 3, 2017	Landsberg, Germany	Rose-Hulman	Landsberg X-Press (Regionalliga South)	82–0
June 4, 2017	Tokyo, Japan	Illinois Wesleyan	Waseda (KCFA)	33–6

== Postseason ==
Twenty-five conferences met the requirements for an automatic ("Pool A") bid to the playoffs. Besides the NESCAC, which does not participate in the playoffs, two conferences had no Pool A bid. The American Southwest, which had fallen below the required seven members in 2013 and lost its Pool A bid after the two-year grace period, was in the second year of the two-year waiting period, having attained seven members in 2016; the NEWMAC, having just begun football sponsorship, was in the first year of the waiting period. Despite losing three members, the Liberty League retained its Pool A bid, but entered the grace period.

Schools not in Pool A conferences were eligible for Pool B. The number of Pool B bids was determined by calculating the ratio of Pool A conferences to schools in those conferences and applying that ratio to the number of Pool B schools. The 25 Pool A conferences contained 215 schools, an average of 8.6 teams per conference. Eighteen schools were in Pool B, enough for two bids.

The remaining five playoff spots were at-large ("Pool C") teams.

=== Playoff bracket ===
First round November 18, 2017
Wisconsin-Oshkosh*	63
Lakeland	0
North Central (IL)*	17
St. John's (MN)	7
Wartburg*	35†
Franklin	34
Trine*	63
Monmouth (IL)	24
Mount Union*	21
Washington & Lee	0
Illinois Wesleyan*	0
Case Western Reserve	28
Washington & Jefferson	31
Johns Hopkins	28
Wittenberg	7
Frostburg State	35
Mary Hardin-Baylor	50
Chapman	6
Linfield	27
Hardin-Simmons	13
St. Thomas (MN)	47
Eureka	8
Berry	34
Huntingdon	20
Delaware Valley	35
Western New England	0
Springfield	21
Husson	23
Brockport	66
Plymouth State	0
Wesley	45
Rensselaer	27

Second round November 25, 2017
Wisconsin–Oshkosh*	42
North Central	21
Wartburg*	49
Trine	7
Mount Union*	45
Case Western Reserve	16
Washington & Jefferson	23
Frostburg State	46
Mary Hardin-Baylor	24
Linfield	0
St. Thomas (MN)	29
Berry	13
Delaware Valley	37
Husson	15
Brockport	49
Wesley	28

Quarterfinals; December 2, 2017
Wisconsin-Oshkosh	41
Wartburg	27
Mount Union	70
Frostburg State	37
Mary Hardin-Baylor	24
St. Thomas (MN)	10
Delaware Valley	28
Brockport	31

Semifinals; December 9, 2017
Wisconsin-Oshkosh	40
Mount Union	43
Mary Hardin-Baylor	24
Brockport	0

Championship; Stagg Bowl; December 15, 2017; Salem Football Stadium; Salem, Virginia
Mount Union	12
Mary Hardin-Baylor	0

* Home team † Overtime Winner

=== Bowl games ===
Date	Bowl	Location	Home team	Away team	Score
Nov. 17, 2017	ECAC Chapman Bowl	Delaware Stadium; Newark, DE	Merchant Marine	Buffalo State	35–20
Nov. 18, 2017	Centennial-MAC Bowl Series	Shadek Stadium; Lancaster, PA	Franklin & Marshall	Widener	21–7
Nov. 18, 2017	Centennial-MAC Bowl Series	Shirk Stadium; Reading, PA	Albright	Susquehanna	28–9
Nov. 18, 2017	ECAC Bushnell Bowl	Delaware Stadium; Newark, DE	Muhlenberg	Carnegie Mellon	36–6
Nov. 18, 2017	ECAC Whitelaw Bowl	Delaware Stadium; Newark, DE	Salisbury	Ithaca	27–17
Nov. 18, 2017	New England Bowl Series	Bowditch Field; Framingham, MA	Framingham State	Curry	48–14
Nov. 18, 2017	New England Bowl Series	Alumni Stadium; Worcester, MA	WPI	SUNY Maritime	17–3
Nov. 18, 2017	New York Bowl	Frank Bailey Field; Schenectady, NY	Union (NY)	SUNY Cortland	35–28
Nov. 19, 2017	ECAC Lynah Bowl	Delaware Stadium; Newark, DE	Stevenson	Alfred	29–16

== See also ==
- 2017 NCAA Division I FBS football season
- 2017 NCAA Division I FCS football season
- 2017 NCAA Division II football season
- 2017 NAIA football season
