= 2016 NCAA Division III football season =

American college football season

- Regular season: September 3 – November 12, 2016
- Playoffs: November 19 – December 16, 2016
- National championship: Salem Football Stadium; Salem, VA
- Champion: ~~Mary Hardin–Baylor~~ (vacated via NCAA violation)
- Gagliardi Trophy: Carter Hanson, Saint John's (MN)

The 2016 NCAA Division III football season, part of the college football season organized by the NCAA at the Division III level in the United States, began on September 5, 2016 and ended with the NCAA Division III Football Championship, also known as the Stagg Bowl, on December 16, 2016 at Salem Football Stadium in Salem, Virginia. However, UMHB's championship was later vacated by the NCAA.

== Conference changes and new programs ==
Three programs changed conference affiliations.

School	2015 conference	2016 conference
Carroll	MWC	CCIW
McMurry	Independent	ASC
Nebraska Wesleyan	Great Plains (NAIA)	IIAC

A full list of Division III teams can be viewed on the D3football website.

This was also the final season of competition for two Division III conferences. The New England Football Conference will be absorbed by the Commonwealth Coast Conference, and the Southern Collegiate Athletic Conference, which had lost most of its membership in 2012 when seven schools left to form the Southern Athletic Association, will end its sponsorship of football and continue as a non-football conference.

== Conference standings ==
2016 American Southwest Conference football standings
	Conf.			Overall
Team	W		L	W		L
No. 1 Mary Hardin–Baylor $^	6	–	0	15	–	0
No. 13 Hardin–Simmons ^	5	–	1	9	–	2
Sul Ross	4	–	2	6	–	4
East Texas Baptist	3	–	3	7	–	3
McMurry #	2	–	4	4	–	5
Louisiana College	1	–	5	4	–	6
Howard Payne	0	–	6	0	–	10
Belhaven *		–		2	–	8
$ – Conference champion; ^ – NCAA Division III playoff participant; # – Provisional NCAA Division III member * – Provisional NCAA Division III member; games not counted in standings; Rankings from D3football.com

2016 Centennial Conference football standings
	Conf.			Overall
Team	W		L	W		L
No. 11 Johns Hopkins $^	9	–	0	11	–	1
Muhlenberg	8	–	1	9	–	2
Franklin & Marshall	6	–	3	7	–	4
Susquehanna	6	–	3	6	–	4
Moravian	4	–	5	5	–	5
Juniata	3	–	6	4	–	6
Gettysburg	3	–	6	3	–	7
McDaniel	3	–	6	3	–	7
Ursinus	2	–	7	2	–	8
Dickinson	1	–	8	1	–	9
$ – Conference champion; ^ – NCAA Division III playoff participant; Rankings from D3football.com

2016 College Conference of Illinois and Wisconsin football standings
	Conf.			Overall
Team	W		L	W		L
No. 10 North Central (IL) $^	8	–	0	11	–	1
No. 8 Wheaton (IL) ^	7	–	1	11	–	2
Illinois Wesleyan	6	–	2	7	–	2
Carthage	5	–	3	7	–	3
Elmhurst	4	–	4	5	–	5
Millikin	3	–	5	4	–	6
Augustana (IL)	2	–	6	3	–	7
Carroll (WI)	1	–	7	1	–	9
North Park	0	–	8	1	–	9
$ – Conference champion; ^ – NCAA Division III playoff participant; Rankings from D3football.com

2016 Eastern Collegiate Football Conference standings
	Conf.			Overall
Team	W		L	W		L
Husson $^	7	–	0	9	–	2
Norwich	5	–	2	5	–	5
Maritime	4	–	3	6	–	5
Castleton	4	–	3	4	–	6
Mount Ida	4	–	3	4	–	6
Becker	2	–	5	3	–	7
Gallaudet	1	–	6	2	–	8
Anna Maria	1	–	6	1	–	9
$ – Conference champion; ^ – NCAA Division III playoff participant

2016 Empire 8 Athletic Conference football standings
	Conf.			Overall
Team	W		L	W		L
No. 12 Alfred $^	8	–	0	12	–	1
No. 25 St. John Fisher	6	–	2	8	–	3
Brockport	6	–	2	7	–	4
Utica	5	–	3	7	–	4
Ithaca	4	–	4	5	–	5
Buffalo State	3	–	5	5	–	5
Cortland	3	–	5	5	–	6
Hartwick	1	–	7	2	–	8
Morrisville State	0	–	8	1	–	9
$ – Conference champion; ^ – NCAA Division III playoff participant; Rankings from D3football.com

2016 Heartland Collegiate Athletic Conference football standings
	Conf.			Overall
Team	W		L	W		L
Franklin (IN) +	7	–	1	8	–	2
Rose–Hulman +^	7	–	1	8	–	3
Mount St. Joseph	6	–	2	6	–	4
Bluffton	5	–	3	7	–	3
Defiance	4	–	4	5	–	5
Hanover	4	–	4	4	–	6
Manchester	2	–	6	2	–	8
Anderson (IN)	1	–	7	1	–	9
Earlham	0	–	8	0	–	10
+ – Conference co-champions; ^ – NCAA Division III playoff participant

2016 Iowa Intercollegiate Athletic Conference football standings
	Conf.			Overall
Team	W		L	W		L
No. 17 Coe $^	8	–	0	11	–	1
Central (IA)	6	–	2	8	–	2
Dubuque	6	–	2	8	–	2
Wartburg	5	–	3	6	–	4
Nebraska Wesleyan	3	–	5	4	–	6
Buena Vista	3	–	5	3	–	7
Luther	2	–	6	3	–	7
Simpson (IA)	2	–	6	3	–	7
Loras	1	–	7	1	–	9
$ – Conference champion; ^ – NCAA Division III playoff participant; Rankings from D3football.com

2016 Liberty League football standings
	Conf.			Overall
Team	W		L	W		L
No. 24 St. Lawrence +	6	–	1	9	–	1
No. 19 Hobart +^	6	–	1	9	–	2
Merchant Marine	4	–	3	5	–	4
Springfield	4	–	3	5	–	5
WPI	3	–	4	6	–	4
RPI	3	–	4	6	–	5
Union (NY)	2	–	5	3	–	7
Rochester (NY)	0	–	7	1	–	8
+ – Conference co-champions; ^ – NCAA Division III playoff participant; Rankings from D3football.com

2016 Massachusetts State Collegiate Athletic Conference football standings
	Conf.			Overall
Team	W		L	W		L
Bridgewater State $^	8	–	0	8	–	3
Framingham State	6	–	2	8	–	3
Plymouth State	4	–	4	6	–	4
UMass Dartmouth	4	–	4	5	–	5
Western Connecticut	4	–	4	5	–	5
Fitchburg State	3	–	5	5	–	5
Massachusetts Maritime	3	–	5	4	–	6
Worcester State	3	–	5	3	–	7
Westfield State	1	–	7	2	–	8
$ – Conference champion; ^ – NCAA Division III playoff participant

2016 Michigan Intercollegiate Athletic Association football standings
	Conf.			Overall
Team	W		L	W		L
Olivet $^	6	–	0	9	–	2
Hope	5	–	1	7	–	3
Alma	4	–	2	7	–	3
Trine	3	–	3	6	–	4
Adrian	2	–	4	4	–	6
Kalamazoo	1	–	5	3	–	7
Albion	0	–	6	1	–	9
$ – Conference champion; ^ – NCAA Division III playoff participant

2016 Middle Atlantic Conference football standings
	Conf.			Overall
Team	W		L	W		L
No. 20 Stevenson $^	8	–	1	9	–	2
Delaware Valley	7	–	2	9	–	2
Albright	7	–	2	8	–	3
Widener	6	–	3	6	–	4
King's	5	–	4	5	–	5
Lebanon Valley	4	–	5	4	–	6
Wilkes	3	–	6	3	–	7
Lycoming	2	–	7	3	–	7
FDU Florham	2	–	7	2	–	8
Misericordia	1	–	8	1	–	9
$ – Conference champion; ^ – NCAA Division III playoff participant; Rankings from D3football.com

2016 Midwest Conference football standings
	Conf.			Overall
Team	W		L	W		L
No. 21 Monmouth (IL) $^	8	–	0	10	–	1
St. Norbert	7	–	1	7	–	3
Lake Forest	6	–	2	8	–	2
Macalester	6	–	2	7	–	3
Illinois College	5	–	3	6	–	4
Cornell (IA)	4	–	4	5	–	5
Beloit	2	–	6	3	–	7
Lawrence	2	–	6	3	–	7
Knox	2	–	6	2	–	8
Ripon	2	–	6	2	–	8
Grinnell	0	–	8	0	–	10
$ – Conference champion; ^ – NCAA Division III playoff participant; Rankings from D3football.com

2016 Minnesota Intercollegiate Athletic Conference football standings
	Conf.			Overall
Team	W		L	W		L
No. 6 St. Thomas (MN) $^	8	–	0	12	–	1
No. 9 Saint John's (MN) ^	7	–	1	10	–	2
Concordia–Moorhead	6	–	2	7	–	3
Bethel (MN)	5	–	3	5	–	5
Gustavus Adolphus	3	–	5	5	–	5
Hamline	3	–	5	5	–	5
Augsburg	2	–	6	2	–	8
St. Olaf	1	–	7	2	–	8
Carleton	1	–	7	1	–	9
$ – Conference champion; ^ – NCAA Division III playoff participant; Rankings from D3football.com

2016 New England Football Conference standings
	Conf.			Overall
Team	W		L	W		L
No. 22 Western New England $^	7	–	0	11	–	1
Salve Regina	6	–	1	8	–	2
Endicott	5	–	2	5	–	5
Nichols	4	–	3	6	–	4
MIT	3	–	4	3	–	7
Coast Guard	2	–	5	3	–	7
Curry	1	–	6	3	–	6
Maine Maritime	0	–	7	1	–	8
$ – Conference champion; ^ – NCAA Division III playoff participant; Rankings from D3football.com

2016 New England Small College Athletic Conference football standings
	Conf.			Overall
Team	W		L	W		L
Trinity (CT) $	8	–	0	8	–	0
Tufts	7	–	1	7	–	1
Middlebury	6	–	2	6	–	2
Wesleyan	6	–	2	6	–	2
Amherst	4	–	4	4	–	4
Bates	3	–	5	3	–	5
Colby	3	–	5	3	–	5
Hamilton	3	–	5	3	–	5
Bowdoin	0	–	8	0	–	8
Williams	0	–	8	0	–	8
$ – Conference champion

2016 New Jersey Athletic Conference football standings
	Conf.			Overall
Team	W		L	W		L
No. 23 Frostburg State +	8	–	1	10	–	1
No. 15 Wesley +^	8	–	1	9	–	3
Salisbury	6	–	3	8	–	3
Christopher Newport	6	–	3	7	–	3
Kean	5	–	4	7	–	4
Rowan	5	–	4	6	–	4
Montclair State	3	–	6	4	–	6
TCNJ	2	–	7	2	–	8
Southern Virginia	1	–	8	2	–	8
William Paterson	1	–	8	2	–	8
+ – Conference co-champions; ^ – NCAA Division III playoff participant; Rankings from D3football.com

2016 North Coast Athletic Conference football standings
	Conf.			Overall
Team	W		L	W		L
No. 16 Wittenberg $^	8	–	1	10	–	2
Denison	7	–	2	8	–	2
DePauw	7	–	2	8	–	2
Wabash	7	–	2	8	–	2
Ohio Wesleyan	6	–	3	6	–	4
Wooster	4	–	5	4	–	6
Hiram	3	–	6	3	–	7
Kenyon	2	–	7	3	–	7
Allegheny	1	–	8	1	–	9
Oberlin	0	–	9	0	–	10
$ – Conference champion; ^ – NCAA Division III playoff participant; Rankings from D3football.com

2016 Northern Athletics Collegiate Conference football standings
	Conf.			Overall
Team	W		L	W		L
Lakeland +^	5	–	1	7	–	4
Aurora +	5	–	1	6	–	4
Benedictine (IL)	4	–	2	6	–	4
Wisconsin Lutheran	4	–	2	5	–	5
Concordia (IL)	2	–	4	4	–	6
Concordia (WI)	1	–	5	3	–	7
Rockford	0	–	6	1	–	9
+ – Conference co-champions; ^ – NCAA Division III playoff participant

2016 Northwest Conference football standings
	Conf.			Overall
Team	W		L	W		L
No. 7 Linfield $^	7	–	0	9	–	2
Whitworth	6	–	1	8	–	2
George Fox	5	–	2	5	–	4
Pacific Lutheran	4	–	3	5	–	4
Pacific (OR)	3	–	4	4	–	6
Willamette	2	–	5	3	–	7
Puget Sound	1	–	6	3	–	6
Lewis & Clark	0	–	7	0	–	9
$ – Conference champion; ^ – NCAA Division III playoff participant; Rankings from D3football.com

2016 Ohio Athletic Conference football standings
	Conf.			Overall
Team	W		L	W		L
No. 3 John Carroll $^	9	–	0	12	–	2
No. 4 Mount Union ^	8	–	1	12	–	2
Heidelberg	6	–	3	6	–	4
Ohio Northern	5	–	4	5	–	5
Otterbein	5	–	4	5	–	5
Capital	4	–	5	4	–	6
Muskingum	3	–	6	4	–	6
Marietta	3	–	6	3	–	7
Baldwin Wallace	2	–	7	3	–	7
Wilmington (OH)	0	–	9	0	–	10
$ – Conference champion; ^ – NCAA Division III playoff participant; Rankings from D3football.com

2016 Old Dominion Athletic Conference football standings
	Conf.			Overall
Team	W		L	W		L
Randolph–Macon $^	6	–	1	9	–	2
Emory & Henry	5	–	2	6	–	4
Washington and Lee	5	–	2	6	–	4
Shenandoah	4	–	3	6	–	4
Bridgewater	4	–	3	5	–	5
Hampden–Sydney	3	–	4	3	–	7
Guilford	1	–	6	4	–	6
Catholic University	0	–	7	3	–	7
$ – Conference champion; ^ – NCAA Division III playoff participant

2016 Presidents' Athletic Conference football standings
	Conf.			Overall
Team	W		L	W		L
No. 18 Thomas More $^	8	–	0	9	–	2
Case Western Reserve	7	–	1	9	–	1
Washington & Jefferson	6	–	2	9	–	2
Carnegie Mellon	6	–	2	7	–	4
Westminster (PA)	5	–	3	8	–	3
Saint Vincent	3	–	5	5	–	5
Thiel	3	–	5	4	–	6
Bethany (WV)	2	–	6	3	–	7
Geneva	2	–	6	3	–	7
Waynesburg	2	–	6	2	–	8
Grove City	0	–	8	0	–	10
$ – Conference champion; ^ – NCAA Division III playoff participant; Rankings from D3football.com

2016 Southern Athletic Association football standings
	Conf.			Overall
Team	W		L	W		L
Berry +	7	–	1	9	–	1
Washington University +^	7	–	1	8	–	3
Centre	6	–	2	8	–	2
Hendrix	5	–	3	7	–	3
Rhodes	4	–	4	6	–	4
Chicago	4	–	4	4	–	6
Millsaps	2	–	6	3	–	7
Birmingham–Southern	1	–	7	1	–	9
Sewanee	0	–	8	0	–	10
+ – Conference co-champions; ^ – NCAA Division III playoff participant

2016 Southern California Intercollegiate Athletic Conference football standings
	Conf.			Overall
Team	W		L	W		L
Redlands $^	7	–	0	8	–	2
Claremont–Mudd–Scripps	5	–	2	7	–	2
Pomona–Pitzer	5	–	2	6	–	3
Chapman	4	–	3	5	–	4
Cal Lutheran	4	–	3	4	–	5
La Verne	2	–	5	2	–	7
Occidental	1	–	6	1	–	8
Whittier	0	–	7	0	–	9
$ – Conference champion; ^ – NCAA Division III playoff participant; Rankings from D3football.com

2016 Southern Collegiate Athletic Conference football standings
	Conf.			Overall
Team	W		L	W		L
Southwestern (TX) $	6	–	0	7	–	3
Trinity (TX)	3	–	3	5	–	5
Texas Lutheran	2	–	4	2	–	8
Austin	1	–	5	3	–	7
$ – Conference champion

2016 Upper Midwest Athletic Conference football standings
	Conf.			Overall
Team	W		L	W		L
Northwestern (MN) $^	8	–	1	9	–	2
Eureka	7	–	2	8	–	2
MacMurray	7	–	2	8	–	2
St. Scholastica	7	–	2	7	–	3
Minnesota–Morris	5	–	4	6	–	4
Westminster (MO)	4	–	5	4	–	6
Iowa Wesleyan #	3	–	6	3	–	7
Crown	2	–	7	2	–	8
Greenville	2	–	7	2	–	8
Martin Luther	0	–	9	0	–	10
$ – Conference champion; ^ – NCAA Division III playoff participant; # – Provisional NCAA Division III member

2016 USA South Athletic Conference football standings
	Conf.			Overall
Team	W		L	W		L
Huntingdon +^	6	–	1	9	–	2
Maryville (TN) +	6	–	1	8	–	2
North Carolina Wesleyan	4	–	2	5	–	4
Ferrum	4	–	3	6	–	4
Averett	4	–	3	5	–	5
Methodist	2	–	4	3	–	6
LaGrange	1	–	6	3	–	7
Greensboro	0	–	7	1	–	9
+ – Conference co-champions; ^ – NCAA Division III playoff participant

2016 Wisconsin Intercollegiate Athletic Conference football standings
	Conf.			Overall
Team	W		L	W		L
No. 5 Wisconsin–Whitewater $^	7	–	0	12	–	1
No. 2 Wisconsin–Oshkosh ^	6	–	1	13	–	2
No. 14 Wisconsin–Platteville ^	5	–	2	8	–	3
Wisconsin–Stevens Point	3	–	4	6	–	4
Wisconsin–River Falls	3	–	4	4	–	6
Wisconsin–La Crosse	2	–	5	5	–	5
Wisconsin–Stout	1	–	6	3	–	7
Wisconsin–Eau Claire	1	–	6	2	–	8
$ – Conference champion; ^ – NCAA Division III playoff participant; Rankings from D3football.com

2016 NCAA Division III independents football records
	Conf.			Overall
Team	W		L	W		L
Dean**		–		1	–	1
Maranatha Baptist		–		2	–	7
Finlandia		–		1	–	7
Alfred State*		–		1	–	9
* – Provisional Division III member ** – Dean was accepted as a Division III football program for the 2016 season and finished with a 6–4 overall record, but only two games were against varsity level teams.

== Postseason ==
Twenty-five conferences met the requirements for an automatic ("Pool A") bid to the playoffs. Besides the NESCAC, which does not participate in the playoffs, two conferences had no Pool A bid. The American Southwest, which had fallen below the required seven members in 2013 and lost its Pool A bid after the two-year grace period, was in the first year of the two-year waiting period, having now attained seven members; the SCAC had only four members.

Schools not in Pool A conferences were eligible for Pool B. The number of Pool B bids was determined by calculating the ratio of Pool A conferences to schools in those conferences and applying that ratio to the number of Pool B schools. The 25 Pool A conferences contained 222 schools, an average of 8.9 teams per conference. Twelve schools were in Pool B, enough for one bid.

The remaining six playoff spots were at-large ("Pool C") teams.

=== Playoff bracket ===
**First round** November 19, 2016
**Mary Hardin-Baylor***	**50**
Redlands	28
Hardin-Simmons*	10
**Linfield**	**24**
**Wheaton***	**45**
Huntingdon	10
**North Central***	**41**
Rose-Hulman	7
**Alfred*** †	**33**
Bridgewater State	27
**Western New England***	**44**
Husson	27
Hobart*	21
**Mount Union**	**38**
**Johns Hopkins***	**42**
Randolph-Macon	21
**St. Thomas***	**43**
Northwestern (MN)	0
**Coe***	**21**
Monmouth	14
**St. John's***	**32**
UW-Platteville	31
**UW-Oshkosh***	**49**
Washington U.	13
**John Carroll***	**37**
Olivet	12
**Wesley***	**38**
Stevenson	17
Thomas More*	30
**Wittenberg** †	**33**
**UW-Whitewater***	**45**
Lakeland	27

**Second round** November 26, 2016
**Mary Hardin-Baylor***	**27**
Linfield	10
**Wheaton**	**31**
North Central*	14
**Alfred***	**30**
Western New England	24
**Mount Union**	**28**
Johns Hopkins*	21
**St. Thomas***	**55**
Coe	6
St. John's	14
**UW-Oshkosh***	**31**
**John Carroll*** ††	**20**
Wesley	17
Wittenberg	9
**UW-Whitewater***	**37**

**Quarterfinals**; December 3, 2016
**Mary Hardin-Baylor***	**38**
Wheaton	16
Alfred*	45
**Mount Union**	**70**
St. Thomas*	31
**UW-Oshkosh**	**34**
**John Carroll**	**31**
UW-Whitewater*	14

**Semifinals**; December 10, 2016
**Mary Hardin-Baylor***	**14**
Mount Union	12
**UW-Oshkosh***	**10**
John Carroll	3

**Championship**; December 16, 2016; Salem Football Stadium; Salem, Virginia
**Mary Hardin-Baylor**	**10**
UW-Oshkosh	7

* Home team † Overtime Winner

=== Bowl games ===
Winning teams are denoted in bold.

Date	Bowl	Stadium City	Home team	Away team	Score
Nov. 18, 2016	ECAC Chapman Bowl	Franklin Field; Philadelphia, Pennsylvania	**Kean**	SUNY-Cortland	30–27
Nov. 18, 2016	ECAC President's Bowl	Franklin Field; Philadelphia, Pennsylvania	**Washington & Jefferson**	Brockport	38–31
Nov. 19, 2016	ECAC Lynah Bowl	Franklin Field; Philadelphia, Pennsylvania	Utica	**Westminster (PA)**	33–6
Nov. 19, 2016	ECAC Bushnell Bowl	Franklin Field; Philadelphia, Pennsylvania	No. 24 **Frostburg State**	No. 22 St. John Fisher	38–14
Nov. 19, 2016	New England Bowl	Gaudet Field; Middletown, Rhode Island	Salve Regina	**Framingham State**	37–34
Nov. 19, 2016	Centennial-MAC Bowl Series	Scotty Wood Stadium; Allentown, Pennsylvania	Muhlenberg	**Delaware Valley**	30–27
Nov. 19, 2016	Centennial-MAC Bowl Series	Shirk Stadium; Reading, Pennsylvania	**Albright**	Franklin & Marshall	28–23
Nov. 20, 2016	ECAC Legacy Bowl	Franklin Field; Philadelphia, Pennsylvania	Carnegie Mellon	**Salisbury**	52–20
Nov. 20, 2016	ECAC Whitelaw Bowl	Franklin Field; Philadelphia, Pennsylvania	SUNY-Maritime	**RPI**	38–6

== See also ==
- 2016 NCAA Division I FBS football season
- 2016 NCAA Division I FCS football season
- 2016 NCAA Division II football season
- 2016 NAIA football season
