= Huntingdon Hawks football =

Huntingdon College Football Team

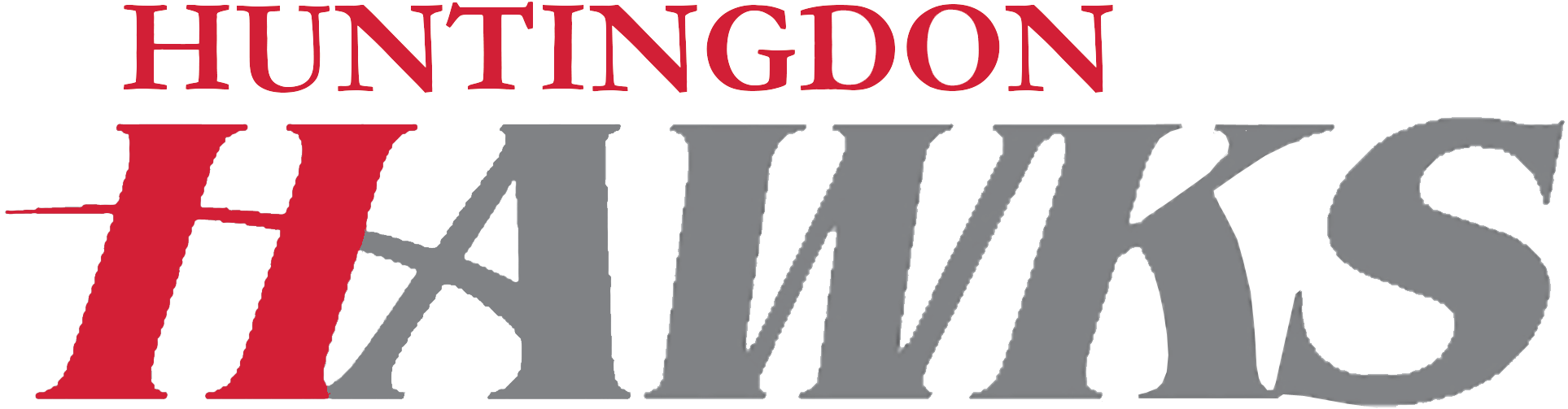
- First season: 2003; 23 years ago
- Athletic director: Eric Levanda
- Head coach: Mike Turk; 23rd season, 150–69 (.685)
- Location: Montgomery, Alabama
- Stadium: Charles Lee Field at Samford Stadium (capacity: 2,500)
- Conference: USA South
- Colors: Scarlet and Grey
- All-time record: 150–76 (.664)
- Playoff record: 2–7 (.222)

National championships
- Claimed: 0

College Football Playoff appearances
- Div. III: 7 (2009, 2015, 2016, 2017, 2019, 2021, 2022)

Conference championships
- USA South: 4 (2015, 2016, 2017, 2019, 2021, 2022)
- Consensus All-Americans: 3
- Rivalries: Maryville; Birmingham–Southern (Wesley Cup); LaGrange; Faulkner (Bible Bowl)
- Mascot: Hawks
- Website: huntingdonhawks.com

The Huntingdon Hawks football team represents Huntingdon College in the sport of American football. The team plays at Charles Lee Field at Samford Stadium in Montgomery, Alabama. The Huntingdon Hawks compete in Division III of National Collegiate Athletic Association (NCAA). They compete in the USA South Athletic Conference and have won three conference championships in 2015, 2016, and 2017. The Hawks are currently coached by Mike Turk, who has served as the team's head football coach since 2004.

== Conference affiliations ==
- NCAA Division III independent (2003–2007)
- St. Louis Intercollegiate Athletic Conference (2008)
- NCAA Division III independent (2009–2012)
- USA South Athletic Conference (2013–present)

== Head coaching history ==
Huntingdon has had two head coaches since organized football began in 2003. The Hawks first head football coach was Duane Trogdon, who served as in the position for Huntingdon's first season in 2003 leading the team to their only winless season to date with a record of 0–7. In 2004 Huntingdon College hired then-Troy assistant coach and former Troy quarterback Mike Turk as their new head football coach. Turk has since led the Hawks with an overall record of 150–69 as of the 2025 season.

== Yearly records ==
| Season | Head coach | Overall record | Conf. record | Conf. standing | Conference | Playoffs |
|---|---|---|---|---|---|---|
| 2003 | Duane Trogdon | 0–7 | | | D-III independent | |
| 2004 | Mike Turk | 4–5 | | | D-III independent | |
| 2005 | Mike Turk | 7–2 | | | D-III independent | |
| 2006 | Mike Turk | 6–4 | | | D-III independent | |
| 2007 | Mike Turk | 5–5 | | | D-III independent | |
| 2008 | Mike Turk | 8–2 | 6–1 | 2nd | SLIAC | |
| 2009 | Mike Turk | 8–3 | | | D-III independent | NCAA Division III First Round |
| 2010 | Mike Turk | 6–4 | | | D-III independent | |
| 2011 | Mike Turk | 7–3 | | | D-III independent | |
| 2012 | Mike Turk | 6–3 | | | D-III independent | |
| 2013 | Mike Turk | 7–3 | 5–2 | T–3rd | USA South | |
| 2014 | Mike Turk | 7–3 | 6–2 | T–2nd | USA South | |
| 2015 | Mike Turk | 10–2 | 7–0 | 1st | USA South | NCAA Division III First Round |
| 2016 | Mike Turk | 9–2 | 6–1 | T–1st | USA South | NCAA Division III First Round |
| 2017 | Mike Turk | 9–2 | 7–0 | 1st | USA South | NCAA Division III First Round |
| 2018 | Mike Turk | 4–5 | 4–3 | T–3rd | USA South | |
| 2019 | Mike Turk | 8–4 | 6–1 | 1st | USA South | NCAA Division III Second Round |
| 2020 | Mike Turk | 3–1 | 2–1 | T–2nd | USA South | |
| 2021 | Mike Turk | 8–3 | 8–0 | 1st | USA South | NCAA Division III First Round |
| 2022 | Mike Turk | 9–2 | 7–0 | 1st | USA South | NCAA Division III First Round |
| 2023 | Mike Turk | 8–2 | 6–1 | 2nd | USA South | |
| 2024 | Mike Turk | 5–5 | 5–3 | T–4th | USA South | |
| 2025 | Mike Turk | 6–4 | 5–2 | T–2nd | USA South | |

== Playoff appearances ==
=== NCAA Division III ===
The Hawks have made eight appearances in the NCAA Division III playoffs, with a combined record of 2–7.

| Year | Round | Opponent | Result |
|---|---|---|---|
| 2009 | First Round | Mississippi College | L, 35–56 |
| 2015 | First Round; Second Round | Hendrix; Mary Hardin–Baylor | W, 38–27; L, 23–43 |
| 2016 | First Round | Wheaton (IL) | L, 10–45 |
| 2017 | First Round | Berry | L, 20–34 |
| 2019 | First Round; Second Round | Berry; Mary Hardin–Baylor | W, 27–24; L, 6–42 |
| 2021 | First Round | Birmingham–Southern | L, 14–24 |
| 2022 | First Round | Mary Hardin–Baylor | L, 0–54 |
| 2026 | First Round | Claremont-Mudd-Scripps | TBP |

== Rivalries ==
=== Birmingham–Southern Panthers ===
The Wesley Cup is the annually game between the Huntingdon Hawks and the Birmingham–Southern Panthers. Starting in the 2009 season these two teams have played every year for the "Wesley Cup" trophy typically in the month of September. The game is named after John Wesley, the founder of the Methodist church, both, schools are private United Methodist Colleges. Birmingham-Southern leads the series 5–4.

=== Faulkner Eagles ===
The Bible Bowl was a game played between Huntingdon and Faulkner. Both colleges are private Christian colleges located in Montgomery, Alabama. The series was played from 2007 through 2011 with Huntingdon winning all five meetings between the two schools to date. The series ended with the 2011 game being the last between the two schools for now. With Huntingdon looking to play more Division III opponents to better position themselves for playoffs. Along with the Faulkner playing football in the National Association of Intercollegiate Athletics (NAIA) a completely separate organization of college athletics than the NCAA. With their conference the Mid-South Conference requiring them to schedule 10 of their potential 10–11 games as conference opponents. Thus reducing the opportunity for the two schools scheduling each other.

=== Maryville Scots ===
The Maryville Scots of Maryville, Tennessee and the Huntingdon Hawks have been annual foes since their first meeting in the 2004 season and have only missed one season playing each other, 2006. Huntingdon leads the all-time series versus Maryville 11–3 and won 10 straight from 2008 to 2017.

=== LaGrange Panthers ===
Huntingdon and LaGrange have been a fixture on each other's schedules since the 2006 season. Both Schools are private United Methodist colleges. Since 2006, the two schools have met a total of 13 times with Huntingdon dominating the series 10–3 and winning the most recent matchup 42–14 on November 11, 2018.
