= Husson Eagles football, 2003–2009 =

American college football season

2003–2009 Husson Eagles football
- Conference: Independent (2003–2008); ECFC (2009)
- Head coach: Gabby Price (2003–2008); Niles Nelson (2009)
- Home stadium: Winkin Sports Complex

The Husson Eagles football program, 2003–2009 represented Husson University during the 2000s in college football as an independent until 2008 and as a member of the Eastern Collegiate Football Conference (ECFC) in 2009. The team was led by two different head coaches: Gabby Price from 2003 to 2008 and Niles Nelson, who held the position from 2009 to 2010. This was the second iteration of football at Husson, as the team disbanded after the 1936 season due to low participation and returned briefly in 1938 as a six-man football team, but did not field a full team again until 2003. The six-man team's stats are not reflected in the overall records or stats.

The team was first referred to as the Braves in 2003 before becoming the Eagles ahead of the 2004 season.

== Decade overview ==
Year	Head coach	Overall record	Conf. record	Conf. rank	Points scored	Points allowed	Delta
2003	Gabby Price	0–7			60	271	-211
2004	Gabby Price	2–7			174	278	-104
2005	Gabby Price	4–4			254	146	+108
2006	Gabby Price	6–4			176	175	+1
2007	Gabby Price	6–3			303	186	+117
2008	Gabby Price	7–3			281	190	+91
2009	Niles Nelson	4–5	3–3	T–4th	275	201	+74
Total		29–33	3–3		1,523	1,447	+76

== 2003 ==
2003 Husson Braves football
- Conference: Independent
- Record: 0–7
- Head coach: Gabby Price (1st season)
- Offensive coordinator: Fred Lower (1st season)
- Captains: Lee St. Hilaire; Jim Tribou; Nate Roberts
- Home stadium: Winkin Sports Complex

The 2003 Husson Braves football team represented Husson College—now known as Husson University—as an independent during the 2003 NCAA Division III football season. In their first year under head coach Gabby Price, the team compiled a 0–7 record and was outscored by opponents by a total of 60 to 271.

Husson's board of trustees voted unanimously to bring back football as an intercollegiate sport with a budget of $250,000. Former Bangor High School head coach Gabby Price was tabbed as the team's inaugural head coach. The team began with 35 players but bloomed to 72 before the beginning of the season.

The team had three captains: quarterback Lee St. Hilaire, linebacker Jim Tribou, and defensive lineman Nate Roberts. St. Hilaire was the Maine high school football's all-time passing leader and had enrolled to play Division I football for Maine before quitting the team midway through the season. He returned to the gridiron for Husson's first season after a year out of playing. In February 2004, St. Hilaire died of an apparent suicide from a self-inflicted gunshot wound in his stomach.

St. Hilaire completed 79 of 172 passes for 960 yards, five touchdowns, and six interceptions. The team's leading rushers were running backs Justin Spencer and Josh Nowlin who finished with 352 and 250 yards, respectively. Wide receiver Ryan Lockard was the team's leading receiver with 312 receiving yards on 19 catches.

=== Schedule ===
Date	Time	Opponent	Site	Result	Attendance	Source
September 6	10:00 a.m.	at MIT	Steinbrenner Stadium; Cambridge, MA	L 9–13 (scrimmage)		
September 13	1:00 p.m.	at Alfred State	Alfred, NY	L 14–42	250	
September 20	1:00 p.m.	Mount Ida^{†}	Winkin Sports Complex; Bangor, ME	L 28–35	1,500	
September 27	1:30 p.m.	at Bluffton	Salzman Stadium; Bluffton, OH	L 6–36		
October 4	12:30 p.m.	at Utica	Charles A. Gaetano Stadium; Utica, NY	L 0–36		
October 18	2:00 p.m.	Assumption	Winkin Sports Complex; Bangor, ME	L 12–47	1,774	
October 25	1:00 p.m.	Wesley (DE)	Winkin Sports Complex; Bangor, ME	L 0–51	620	
November 8	1:00 p.m.	at FDU–Florham	Robert T. Shields Field; Madison, NJ	L 0–36	682	
^{†}Homecoming

=== Roster ===
2003 Husson Braves football team roster
Players
Coaches
Offense

Pos.	#	Name	Class
QB	1	Mike Parziale	Fr
RB	2	Josh Nowlin	Fr
WR	4	Patrick Paine	Fr
RB	5	Mike Bennett	Fr
WR	7	Colby Horne	Fr
QB	11	Lee St. Hilaire (C)	Fr
QB	13	David Chase	Fr
WR	15	Chris Parziale	Fr
WR	16	Ryan Lockard	Fr
WR	19	Justin Brownell	Fr
RB	20	Justin Spencer	Fr
RB	21	Adam Robinson	Fr
WR	22	Greg Aucion	Fr
WR	23	Matt Whitehouse	Fr
RB	31	Peter Kirby	Fr
RB	34	Ryan Taylor	Fr
RB	35	Matt Graves	Fr
RB	40	Jason Jack	So
RB	44	Charlie Goodwin	Fr
OL	50	Jeff McMahon	Fr
OL	52	Bill Brosseau	Fr
OL	54	Mike Simpson	Fr
OL	57	Tyler Alexander	Fr
OL	58	David Brown	Fr
OL	59	Dwayne Currier	Fr
OL	60	Josh Gallagher	Fr
OL	62	Mike Closson	Fr
OL	63	Adam Furin	Fr
OL	65	Chris Surran	Fr
OL	69	Jon Bedard	Fr
OL	70	Marc Hartford	Fr
OL	73	Josh Evans	Fr
OL	74	Josh Carver	Fr
OL	75	Sean Munroe	Fr
OL	78	John Frake	Fr
WR	80	Chris McInnis	Fr
TE	81	Brian Lancaster	Fr
TE	82	Brian Taylor	Fr
TE	83	Andy Munzing	Fr
WR	85	Ryan Fortin	Fr
WR	88	Kyle Poissonnier	Fr

Defense

Pos.	#	Name	Class
DB	6	Tom Faunce	Fr
DB	8	Chad Bennett	Fr
DL	9	Jared Hockman	Fr
DB	10	David Champy	Fr
DB	12	Josh Willey	Fr
DB	14	Adam Patnaude	Fr
DB	17	Kevin White	Fr
DB	24	J. P. Folckemer	Fr
DB	25	Steve Instasi	Fr
LB	28	David Zabala	Fr
DB	29	Matt Karlson	Fr
DB	30	Jared Foster	Fr
DB	32	Frank Maltais	Fr
LB	33	Jim Tribou (C)	Jr
DL	42	Nate Roberts (C)	Fr
LB	43	Chris Tracy	Fr
LB	45	Josh Lemieux	Fr
LB	51	Sean Floyd	Fr
DL	55	Louis Avent	Fr
DL	64	Doug Geis	Fr
DL	67	Readell Orff	Fr
DL	68	Adam Premo	Fr
DL	72	Scott Hatch	Fr
DL	76	AJ Buzzell	Fr
DL	84	Jack Morse	Fr
LB	87	Tom Lasko	Fr
DB	89	Athian Majok	Fr
DL	95	William Perry	Fr
DL	99	Tyler Libbey	Fr

Special teams

Pos.	#	Name	Class
K	3	Amos Reid	Fr
K	18	Andrew Monzon	Fr

Head coach

- Gabby Price

Coordinators/assistant coaches

- Nat Clark
  (Assistant head coach, special teams coordinator, & offensive line coach)
- Fred Lower
  (Offensive coordinator & quarterbacks coach)
- Tom Whitney
  (Running backs coach)
- Dan Chadbourne
  (Defensive line coach)
- Art Greenlaw
  (Defensive backs coach)
- Jeff Guerette
  (Defensive ends coach)
- Mike Wilcox
  (Wide receivers coach)

Legend

- (C) Team captain
- (S) Suspended
- (I) Ineligible
- Injured
- Redshirt

Roster

== 2004 ==
2004 Husson Eagles football
- Conference: Independent
- Record: 2–7
- Head coach: Gabby Price (2nd season)
- Offensive coordinator: Fred Lower (2nd season)
- Defensive coordinator: Niles Nelson (1st season)
- Captain: Jim Tribou
- Home stadium: Winkin Sports Complex

The 2004 Husson Eagles football team represented Husson College—now known as Husson University—as an independent during the 2004 NCAA Division III football season. In their second year under head coach Gabby Price, the team compiled a 2–7 record and was outscored by opponents by a total of 174 to 278.

Husson transitioned its mascot from the Braves to the Eagles prior to the season. Eagles won the popular student vote over the Hawks and Timberwolves.

After losing the first 12 games of the program's restart, Husson earned its first win since October 13, 1934, with a 28–14 victory over winless Southern Virginia in Bangor. Alongside the team's first win, Husson gained traction into joining the New England Football Conference (NEFC), but ultimately remained as an independent.

Quarterback Chase David completed 72 of 188 passes for 1,090 yards, nine touchdowns, and 14 interceptions. The team's leading rusher was running back Mike Prentiss who finished with 1,158 rushing yards and 12 touchdowns. Wide receiver James Dobson and tight end Matt Mulligan were the team's leading receivers with 290 and 282 yards, respectively.

=== Schedule ===
Date	Time	Opponent	Site	Result	Attendance	Source
September 4	12:00 p.m.	at Salve Regina	Toppa Field; Newport, RI	L 28–35	904	
September 11	1:00 p.m.	Utica^{†}	Winkin Sports Complex; Bangor, ME	L 24–46	1,000	
September 18	1:00 p.m.	at WPI	Alumni Stadium; Worcester, MA	L 0–35	537	
September 25	12:00 p.m.	Hartwick	Winkin Sports Complex; Bangor, ME	L 20–50	718	
October 2	1:00 p.m.	at Mount Ida	Alumni Field; Newton, MA	L 27–28	600	
October 9	1:00 p.m.	Southern Virginia	Winkin Sports Complex; Bangor, ME	W 28–14	800	
October 23	1:00 p.m.	at Plymouth State	Currier Field; Plymouth, NH	L 21–33	1,023	
November 6	1:00 p.m.	at FDU–Florham	Robert T. Shields Stadium; Madison, NJ	L 14–28	1,216	
November 13	1:00 p.m.	William Paterson	Winkin Sports Complex; Bangor, ME	W 12–9	438	
^{†}Homecoming

=== Roster ===
2004 Husson Eagles football team roster
Players
Coaches
Offense

Pos.	#	Name	Class
QB	3	David Chase	So
QB	4	Ryan Lockard	So
TE	6	Justin Brownell	So
WR	7	Colby Horne	So
QB	12	Anthony LeVasseur	Fr
WR	19	Dustin Hanscom	Fr
WR	20	Ian Taber	So
WR	23	Adam Patnaude	So
RB	27	Tyler Heber	Fr
RB	28	Mike Prentiss	Fr
RB	30	Scott Wetherell	Fr
RB	34	Ryan Taylor	Fr
RB	40	Jason Jack	Jr
RB	41	Chris Woodman	Fr
RB	42	Matt Hilton	Fr
OL	51	Kurt Tabor	Fr
OL	54	Mike Simpson	So
OL	55	Louis Avent	So
OL	56	Matt Barnard	Fr
OL	57	Callahan Miller	Fr
OL	58	David Brown	So
OL	59	Tyler Hunnewell	Fr
OL	61	Wes Drinkwater	Fr
OL	62	Mike Closson	So
OL	65	Mark Fucile	Fr
OL	72	Chris Surran	So
OL	73	Jason Cross	Fr
OL	75	Sean Munroe	So
OL	76	AJ Buzzell	So
OL	77	Josh Evans	So
OL	78	Chad Caron	Fr
OL	79	Nick Lajoie	Fr
TE	81	Brian Lancaster	So
TE	82	Brian Taylor	So
TE	83	Matt Mulligan	Fr
WR	84	Nate Grade	Fr
WR	85	Josh Johnson	Fr
WR	86	James Guisti	Fr
WR	88	Kyle Poissonnier	So
WR	89	Athian Majok	So
TE	91	David Folsom	Fr

Defense

Pos.	#	Name	Class
LB	1	Josh Lemieux	So
DB	2	Josh Nowlin	So
DB	5	Adam Bishop	Fr
DB	8	Chad Bennett	Jr
DB	9	J. P. Folckemer	So
LB	10	David Rosen	Jr
DB	13	Tim Abbott	Fr
DB	14	Jason Coleman	Fr
DB	15	Tristan Starbird	So
DB	16	Jon Tefft	Fr
LB	17	John Hamilton	Fr
DB	18	Jon Mortimer	Fr
DB	21	Adam Robinson	So
LB	24	Ross Salovitch	Fr
DB	25	Seth Antognoni	Fr
DB	29	Derek Gray	Fr
LB	31	Robbie Elie	Fr
LB	33	Jim Tribou (C)	Sr
DB	35	Lance Cowan	Fr
DB	38	Richard Pimental	Fr
DB	43	Adam Scott	Jr
DB	44	Dylan Veilleux	Fr
LB	45	Shawn McCurdy	Fr
LB	48	Nick Parent	Fr
DL	50	Robert Norris	Fr
DL	52	Bill Brosseau	Jr
DL	53	Mark Richardson	Fr
DL	60	Josh Gallagher	So
LB	63	Adam Furin	So
OL	64	Doug Geis	So
DL	66	Joe Melcher	Fr
DL	67	Pat McDonough	Fr
DL	68	Adam Premo	So
DL	69	Jon Bedard	So
DL	70	Mike Beauregard	Fr
LB	71	Adam Buckingham	So
DL	74	Josh Carver	Jr
DL	87	Tom Lasko	So
DL	95	Chad Flannery	Fr
DL	99	Tyler Libbey	So

Special teams

Pos.	#	Name	Class
K	32	Tyler Hughes	Fr
P	16	Jon Tefft	Fr

Head coach

- Gabby Price

Coordinators/assistant coaches

- Nat Clark
  (Assistant head coach, special teams coordinator, & offensive line coach)
- Fred Lower
  (Offensive coordinator & quarterbacks coach)
- Niles Nelson
  (Defensive coordinator)
- Tom Whitney
  (Running backs coach)
- Dan Chadbourne
  (Defensive line coach)
- Greg Marter
  (Tight ends coach)

Legend

- (C) Team captain
- (S) Suspended
- (I) Ineligible
- Injured
- Redshirt

Roster

== 2005 ==
2005 Husson Eagles football
- Conference: Independent
- Record: 4–4
- Head coach: Gabby Price (3rd season)
- Offensive coordinator: Kevin Magouirk (1st season)
- Defensive coordinator: Niles Nelson (2nd season)
- Captains: David Chase; Jason Jack; Adam Scott; Louis Avent; Tyler Libbey
- Home stadium: Winkin Sports Complex

The 2005 Husson Eagles football team represented Husson College—now known as Husson University—as an independent during the 2005 NCAA Division III football season. In their third year under head coach Gabby Price, the team compiled a 4–4 record and outscored opponents by a total of 254 to 146.

Second-year starting quarterback Chase David completed 71 of 142 passes for 1,119 yards, 11 touchdowns, and 11 interceptions. The team's leading rushers were running backs Julius Williams and Ryan Leon who finished with 576 yards and 10 touchdowns and 456 yards and four touchdowns, respectively. Wide receivers Kyle Poissonnier and Jeremy Shorey were the team's leading receivers with 310 and 233 yards, respectively.

Husson again applied to become a member of the New England Football Conference (NEFC), but Plymouth State and Coast Guard were picked in favor of the Bangor team.

=== Schedule ===
Date	Time	Opponent	Site	Result	Attendance	Source
September 3	2:00 p.m.	Bridgewater State	Winkin Sports Complex; Bangor, ME	L 13–14 (exhibition)		
September 10	1:30 p.m.	at Utica	Charles A. Gaetano Stadium; Utica, NY	L 6–23	1,984	
September 24	12:00 p.m.	at Hartwick	All-Weather Field; Oneonta, NY	L 28–54	1,015	
October 1	1:00 p.m.	Mount Ida^{†}	Winkin Sports Complex; Bangor, ME	W 62–14	500	
October 8	1:00 p.m.	at Southern Virginia	Parry McCluer High School field; Buena Vista, VA	Canceled		
October 15	1:00 p.m.	Maritime	Winkin Sports Complex; Bangor, ME	W 40–0		
October 22	1:00 p.m.	Plymouth State	Winkin Sports Complex; Bangor, ME	L 19–21	400	
October 30	12:00 p.m.	at Becker	Alumni Field; Worcester, MA	W 43–7	457	
November 5	1:00 p.m.	Becker	Winkin Sports Complex; Bangor, ME	W 46–13	850	
November 12	1:00 p.m.	at William Paterson	Wightman Stadium; Wayne, NJ	L 10–14	1,458	
^{†}Homecoming

=== Roster ===
2005 Husson Eagles football team roster
Players
Coaches
Offense

Pos.	#	Name	Class
QB	3	David Chase (C)	Jr
WR	4	Jeremy Shorey	So
TE	6	Justin Brownell	Jr
WR	7	Colby Horne	Sr
QB	12	Josh Willey	Jr
QB	14	Shane Johnson	Fr
WR	18	Daniel Byan	Fr
WR	19	Dustin Hanscom	So
RB	20	Ryan Leon	Fr
RB	21	Tyler Heber	Fr
RB	23	Tristan Hayes	Fr
FB	26	Chris Woodman	So
RB	27	Chris Sawyer	Fr
RB	28	Scott Curtis	Fr
RB	30	John Rawls	Fr
RB	32	Darius Charlton	Fr
TE	34	Ryan Taylor	Sr
WR	35	Mark Klesel	Fr
FB	37	Anthony Witham	Fr
RB	38	Bill Donavan	Fr
RB	39	George Keefe	Fr
RB	40	Jason Jack (C)	Sr
RB	42	Julius Williams	Fr
FB	47	Jared Dunn	Fr
OL	52	Bill Brosseau	Sr
OL	55	Louis Avent (C)	Jr
OL	58	David Brown	Jr
OL	59	Tyler Hunnewell	So
OL	60	Eric Sulzenberg	Fr
OL	61	Wes Drinkwater	So
OL	62	Mike Closson	Jr
OL	66	Mark Fucile	So
OL	67	Matt Benson	So
OL	70	John Robilotto	Fr
OL	71	Pat Ouellette	Fr
OL	72	Chris Surran	Jr
OL	73	Jason Cross	So
OL	75	Sean Munroe	Jr
OL	76	AJ Buzzell	Jr
OL	77	Curtis Castle	Fr
OL	78	Chad Caron	So
OL	79	Josh Pinkney	Fr
WR	80	James Dobson	So
WR	81	Johathan Barret	Fr
TE	82	Austin Podziewski	Fr
TE	83	Matt Kilgore	Fr
WR	84	Nate Grade	So
WR	85	Josh Johnson	So
WR	85	Charles Lemon	Fr
WR	86	Andre Wildman	Fr
TE	87	Tom Lasko	Jr
WR	88	Kyle Poissonnier	Jr
WR	89	Athian Majok	Jr

Defense

Pos.	#	Name	Class
DB	1	Bryan Biggers	Jr
LB	2	Josh Nowlin	Jr
LB	5	Josh Lemieux	Jr
DB	8	Chad Bennett	Sr
DB	9	Matt Gamache	Fr
DB	10	Chris Juntura	So
LB	11	Bobby Gilbert	Fr
DB	13	Tim Abbott	So
LB	15	Shaun Hines	Fr
DB	17	Ramael Barton	Fr
DE	22	Shane Rogers	So
LB	24	Ross Salovitch	So
DB	25	Broc Hardacker	Fr
DB	29	Keith Runne	Fr
DE	30	Scott Wetherell	So
LB	31	Colin Butterly	Fr
LB	33	Robbie Elie	So
DB	36	Jarcoby Mays	Fr
LB	41	Keith McPhee	Fr
FS	43	Adam Scott (C)	Sr
SS	44	Dylan Veilleux	So
LB	45	Shawn McCurdy	So
DB	46	Aaron Johnson	Fr
LB	48	Nick Parent	So
DE	49	Nate Paradis	Fr
DL	50	Cory Smith	Fr
DL	51	Dominic Torch	Fr
DL	53	Chris Smith	Fr
DE	54	Mike Simpson	Jr
DL	56	Joe Laboeuf	Fr
DL	57	Fred Pafume	Fr
DL	63	Ryan Bisson	Fr
LB	64	Patrick Azor	Fr
DL	65	Joe Melcher	So
DL	68	Adam Premo	Jr
LB	69	Justin Barnes	Jr
DL	74	Shawn Hartford	Fr
DL	90	Jerry Sawyer	Fr
DL	91	Ronnie Morse	Fr
DL	92	Jon Benson	Fr
DL	94	Tom Durrell	Fr
LB	95	Chris Ebanks	Fr
DL	96	Micha Mishio	Fr
DL	97	Orion Binney	So
DB	98	Curtis Alston-Dawn	Fr
LB	99	Ryan Luce	Fr
DL	99	Tyler Libbey (C)	Jr

Special teams

Pos.	#	Name	Class
P	16	Jon Tefft	So
K	93	Darren Gauthier	Fr

Head coach

- Gabby Price

Coordinators/assistant coaches

- Nat Clark
  (Assistant head coach, special teams coordinator, & offensive line coach)
- Kevin Magouirk
  (Offensive coordinator & quarterbacks coach)
- Niles Nelson
  (Defensive coordinator)
- Greg Marter
  (Outside linebackers coach)
- Tom Whitney
  (Defensive backs coach)
- Dennis Whitney
  (Wide receivers coach)
- Ken Nelson
  (Defensive line coach)

Legend

- (C) Team captain
- (S) Suspended
- (I) Ineligible
- Injured
- Redshirt

Roster

== 2006 ==
2006 Husson Eagles football
- Conference: Independent
- Record: 6–4
- Head coach: Gabby Price (4th season)
- Offensive coordinator: Kevin Magouirk (2nd season)
- Defensive coordinator: Niles Nelson (3rd season)
- Captains: Bryan Biggers; AJ Buzzell; David Chase; Tyler Libbey; Shane Rogers
- Home stadium: Winkin Sports Complex

The 2006 Husson Eagles football team represented Husson College—now known as Husson University—as an independent during the 2006 NCAA Division III football season. In their fourth year under head coach Gabby Price, the team compiled a 6–4 record and outscored opponents by a total of 176 to 175.

Third-year starting quarterback and two-time team captain Chase David completed 111 of 232 passes for 1,228 yards, ten touchdowns, and 11 interceptions. The team's leading rusher was running back Bryan Ferguson, who finished with 978 yards and seven touchdowns. Wide receivers Jeremy Shorey and Andre Wildman were the team's leading receivers with 423 and 332 yards, respectively.

The team had its first-ever televised game by the New England School of Communications (NESCOM) against Alfred on homecoming.

In four years since the program's restart, the team went from winless to a winning record, including a 17–7 win over NCAA Division I-AA La Salle.

=== Schedule ===
Date	Time	Opponent	Site	Result	Attendance	Source
September 2	11:00 a.m.	at Pace	Pace Field; Pleasantville, NY	L 14–27	1,492	
September 9	1:00 p.m.	Utica	Winkin Sports Complex; Bangor, ME	W 21–7	950	
September 16	2:00 p.m.	at Norwich	Sabine Field; Northfield, VT	W 14–13	3,500	
September 23	12:00 p.m.	Hartwick	Winkin Sports Complex; Bangor, ME	W 20–19		
September 30	1:00 p.m.	at Mount Ida	Alumni Field; Newton, MA	L 12–13	1,500	
October 7	1:00 p.m.	Springfield	Winkin Sports Complex; Bangor, ME	L 16–43	900	
October 14	12:00 p.m.	at Maritime	Reinhart Field; Throggs Neck, NY	W 27–19	200	
October 21	12:00 p.m.	Alfred^{†}	Winkin Sports Complex; Bangor, ME	L 7–24	1,050	
October 28	1:00 p.m.	at La Salle	McCarthy Stadium; Philadelphia, PA	W 17–7	1,044	
November 4	1:00 p.m.	at Becker	Foley Stadium; Worcester, MA	W 28–3	251	
^{†}Homecoming

=== Roster ===
2006 Husson Eagles football team roster
Players
Coaches
Offense

Pos.	#	Name	Class
RB	2	Darius Charlton	So
QB	3	David Chase (C)	Sr
WR	4	Jeremy Shorey	Jr
QB	6	Joel Valerio	Fr
WR	7	Andre Wildman	So
WR	8	Nate Grade	Jr
QB	11	Jonah Chappell	Jr
QB	12	Dan Nehring	Fr
WR	18	Rashad Kendall	Fr
WR	19	Dustin Hanscom	Jr
WR	21	Corey Witham	Fr
RB	23	Tristan Hayes	So
FB	26	Jason Murchinson	Fr
RB	27	Chris Sawyer	So
RB	30	Nathan Cairo	Fr
RB	31	Bryan Ferguson	Fr
FB	34	Anthony Witham	So
FB	36	Jon James	Fr
RB	37	Andy Mondesir	Fr
RB	38	Zac Eaton	Fr
RB	39	Emeka Uwasomba	Fr
RB	40	LeVaughn Johnson	Fr
FB	42	Matt Lewis	Fr
FB	45	Shawn McCurdy	Jr
OL	50	Mike Austin	Fr
OL	52	Jason Dunn	Fr
OL	55	Matt Benson	So
OL	59	Tyler Hunnewell	Jr
OL	60	Ryan Esmail	Fr
OL	61	Wes Drinkwater	Jr
OL	62	Mike Closson	Sr
OL	73	Jason Cross	Jr
OL	74	Will Isbister	Fr
OL	75	Pat Ouellette	So
OL	76	AJ Buzzell (C)	Sr
OL	77	Ben Emmott	Fr
OL	78	David Duran	Fr
OL	79	Josh Pinkney	So
WR	80	Donald Louissaint	Fr
WR	81	Shayne Croan	Fr
WR	82	Mike White	Fr
WR	83	Mardy Simon	Fr
TE	84	PJ Dowe	So
WR	85	Darius Bryant	Fr
WR	86	Tyson Barron	Fr
TE	87	Tom Lasko	Sr
TE	88	Matt Connors	Fr
TE	89	Nate Paradis	So

Defense

Pos.	#	Name	Class
DB	1	Bryan Biggers (C)	Sr
DB	9	Matt Gamache	So
DB	10	Chris M. Morris	Fr
DB	13	Tim Abbott	Jr
LB	14	Adam Johnson	Fr
DB	15	Greg Crupi	So
DB	16	Jon Tefft	Jr
DB	17	Ramael Barton	So
DB	20	Curtis Alston-Dawn	So
DE	22	Shane Rogers (C)	Jr
LB	24	Ross Salovitch	Jr
DB	25	Broc Hardacker	So
DB	28	Nick Davis	Fr
DB	29	Keith Runne	So
LB	32	Cory Smith	So
DB	33	Doug Blades	Fr
DB	34	Tim Fortin	Fr
DB	35	Darryl Linton	So
LB	41	Jordan Scanlon	Fr
DB	43	Nehemiah Barnett	Fr
DE	44	Ben Caldwell	Fr
DB	46	Luis Tejeda	Fr
DB	47	Reed Thomas	Fr
LB	48	Nick Parent	Jr
DL	49	Blake Krukiel	Fr
DL	51	Dominic Torch	So
DE	53	Chris Smith	So
DE	54	Mike Simpson	Sr
LB	56	Jim Fitzpatrick	Fr
DL	57	Josh Mellows	Fr
LB	58	Jamie Bonnell	Fr
DL	63	Mason Tripp	Fr
DE	64	Mike Rancourt	Fr
DL	65	Joe Melcher	Jr
DL	66	Som Ratsakongsy	Fr
DL	67	Brandon Phillbrick	Fr
LB	68	Shawn Sanicki	Fr
DL	69	Justin Barnes	Sr
DE	70	Bryan Creamer	Fr
DL	71	Jim Elmezean	Fr
DL	72	Dan Murphy	Fr
DL	90	Joe DePalma	Fr
DL	91	Brandon Harris	Fr
DL	92	Jon Benson	So
DB	95	Joel Centeno	Fr
DB	96	Chris Marks	Fr
LB	97	Matt Sanzaro	Fr
DB	98	Pat Tweedie	Fr
DL	99	Tyler Libbey (C)	Sr

Special teams

Pos.	#	Name	Class
K	93	Darren Gauthier	So
K	94	Dan Juilli	Fr

Head coach

- Gabby Price

Coordinators/assistant coaches

- Nat Clark
  (Assistant head coach, special teams coordinator, & offensive line coach)
- Kevin Magouirk
  (Offensive coordinator )
- Niles Nelson
  (Defensive coordinator)
- Greg Marter
  (Outside linebackers coach)
- Tom Whitney
  (Defensive backs coach)

Legend

- (C) Team captain
- (S) Suspended
- (I) Ineligible
- Injured
- Redshirt

Roster

== 2007 ==
2007 Husson Eagles football
- Conference: Independent
- Record: 6–3
- Head coach: Gabby Price (5th season)
- Defensive coordinator: Niles Nelson (4th season)
- Captains: Matt Benson; Shane Rogers; Ross Salovitch; Jeremy Shorey
- Home stadium: Winkin Sports Complex

The 2007 Husson Eagles football team represented Husson College—now known as Husson University—as an independent during the 2007 NCAA Division III football season. In their fifth year under head coach Gabby Price, the team compiled a 6–3 record and outscored opponents by a total of 303 to 186.

Quarterback Jonah Chappell completed 93 of 203 passes for 1,298 yards, eight touchdowns, and 11 interceptions. The team's leading rushers were running backs Bryan Ferguson and Julius Wiliams, who finished with 735 yards and seven touchdowns and 713 yards and ten touchdowns, respectively. Wide receivers Victor McKenzie and Andre Wildman were the team's leading receivers with 447 and 376 yards, respectively.

Husson once again competed as an independent, but traction grew for the North Atlantic Conference (NAC) to begin sponsoring football with members such as Gallaudet, Norwich, Maritime, Becker, and Mount Ida. On September 13, 2007, it was announced by the conference's commissioner, Julie Muller, that the conference would add football as a sponsored sport and would begin play in 2009. Despite the announcement, the conference never saw football played.

=== Schedule ===
Date	Time	Opponent	Site	Result	Attendance	Source
August 31	7:00 p.m.	Pace	Winkin Sports Complex; Bangor, ME	W 25–13	1,000	
September 8	1:30 p.m.	at Utica	Charles A. Gaetano Stadium; Utica, NY	W 10–3	978	
September 15	1:00 p.m.	Norwich	Winkin Sports Complex; Bangor, ME	W 44–0	850	
September 22	1:00 p.m.	Hartwick	Wright Stadium; Oneonta, NY	L 27–35	983	
September 29	1:00 p.m.	at Mount Ida^{†}	Winkin Sports Complex; Bangor, ME	W 39–13	1,200–1,500	
October 6	1:00 p.m.	at Springfield	Stagg Field; Springfield, MA	L 28–42	875	
October 13	1:00 p.m.	Maritime	Winkin Sports Complex; Bangor, ME	W 63–7	800	
October 20	12:00 p.m.	at No. 12 Alfred	Merrill Field; Alfred, NY	L 21–53	1,675	
November 3	1:00 p.m.	Becker	Winkin Sports Complex; Bangor, ME	W 46–20	500	
^{†}Homecoming; Rankings from D3football.com poll released prior to the game

=== Roster ===
2007 Husson Eagles football team roster
Players
Coaches
Offense

Pos.	#	Name	Class
WR	1	Andre Wildman	Jr
WR	4	Jeremy Shorey (C)	Sr
WR	5	Kyle Poissonnier	Sr
WR	6	Vincent DiBartolo	Fr
QB	7	Jonah Chappell	Sr
WR	8	Nate Grade	Sr
TE	9	Matt Gamache	Jr
WR	12	Rashad Kendall	So
QB	18	Ryan McCarthy	Fr
QB	19	Alex Williams	Fr
WR	25	Victor McKenzie	Fr
RB	23	Jason Burrell	Fr
RB	28	Justin Lindie	Fr
RB	29	Devin Roberts	Fr
RB	31	Bryan Ferguson	So
RB	37	Andy Mondesir	So
RB	38	Hazen Pingree	Fr
WR	39	Josh Mellows	Fr
FB	41	Mike Toothaker	Fr
RB	42	Julius Williams	So
FB	43	Nehemiah Barnett	So
FB	45	Shawn McCurdy	Sr
OL	50	Mike Austin	So
OL	52	Jon Benson (C)	So
OL	53	Chris Smith	Jr
OL	55	Matt Benson	Sr
OL	58	David Brown	Sr
OL	59	Tyler Hunnewell	Sr
OL	60	Ryan Esmail	So
OL	61	Ben Emmott	So
OL	63	Matt Mckenna	Fr
OL	67	Richard Leclair	Fr
OL	69	Spaulding Matt	Fr
OL	72	Jimmy Yarde	So
OL	73	Jason Cross	Sr
OL	74	Sean Munroe	Sr
OL	75	Pat Ouellette	Jr
OL	76	Louis Avent	Sr
OL	77	Robert Seccareccia	Fr
OL	78	David Duran	So
WR	80	Donald Louissaint	So
WR	81	Roderic Johnson	Fr
RB	82	Zac Eaton	So
WR	83	Tom Crews	Fr
TE	84	PJ Dowe	Fr
WR	85	Quinton King	Fr
WR	86	Jeff Jordan	Fr
WR	87	Adam Rooney	Fr
TE	88	Travis Barnies	Fr
TE	89	Nate Paradis	Jr

Defense

Pos.	#	Name	Class
DB	2	Darius Charlton	Jr
DB	3	Darius Bryant	So
DB	10	Jared Tucker	Fr
LB	11	Bobby Gilbert	So
DB	13	Tim Abbott	Sr
DB	15	Greg Crupi	Jr
LB	17	Tom Hazelhurst	Fr
DB	20	Joel Centeno	So
DB	21	Ramael Barton	Jr
DE	22	Shane Rogers (C)	Sr
LB	24	Ross Salovitch (C)	Sr
DB	26	Kyle Dwyer	Fr
DB	27	Pat Tweedie	So
LB	30	Nathan Cairo	So
LB	32	Cory Smith	Jr
DB	33	Doug Blades	So
DB	34	Marcus Dixon	Fr
DB	35	Keith Runne	Jr
DB	36	David Flynn	Fr
DE	44	Ben Caldwell	So
DB	46	Tristan Oldmixon	Fr
LB	47	Jon Doyen	Fr
LB	48	Nick Parent	Sr
DB	49	Mike Corbo	So
LB	51	Dominic Torch	Jr
DE	54	Som Ratsakongsy	So
LB	56	Jamie Bonnell	So
LB	57	Dana Tullis	Fr
LB	62	Keenon Blindow	So
DE	64	Jordan Ciania	Fr
DL	65	Joe Melcher	Sr
DL	66	Annibal Sanchez	Fr
DL	68	Joe Menard	Fr
DL	71	Mark Cugini	Fr
DL	79	Aaron Chaffin	So
DE	90	Richard Chavez	Fr
DL	91	Brandon Harris	So
DE	92	Obed Rinvil	Fr
DL	93	Eric Clark	Fr
DL	94	Ron Packard	Fr
DL	95	Kyle Romick	Fr
DL	96	Wes Gagne	Fr
DL	97	Jon Spencer	Fr
DE	98	Deryl Niles	Fr
DL	99	Taylor Pleasant	Fr

Special teams

Pos.	#	Name	Class
K	14	Darren Gauthier	Jr
P	16	Dan Nehring	So
K	40	Oscar Ody	Sr

Head coach

- Gabby Price

Coordinators/assistant coaches

- Nat Clark
  (Assistant head coach, special teams coordinator, & offensive line coach)
- Niles Nelson
  (Defensive coordinator & inside linebackers coach)
- Duncan Averill
  (Wide receivers coach)
- Nate Quirion
  (Running backs coach)
- Greg Marter
  (Defensive line coach)
- Walter Polky
  (Outside linebackers coach)
- Tom Whitney
  (Defensive backs coach)
- Tom Laski
  (Tight ends coach)
- Josh Lemieux
  (Student assistant/assistant defensive backs coach)

Legend

- (C) Team captain
- (S) Suspended
- (I) Ineligible
- Injured
- Redshirt

Roster

== 2008 ==
2008 Husson Eagles football

Northeast Championship Bowl, L 7–17 vs. St. John Fisher
- Conference: Independent
- Record: 7–3
- Head coach: Gabby Price (6th season)
- Defensive coordinator: Niles Nelson (5th season)
- Captains: Jon Benson; Darius Charlton; Bobby Gilbert; Cory Smith; Dominic Torch
- Home stadium: Winkin Sports Complex

The 2008 Husson Eagles football team represented Husson University as an independent during the 2008 NCAA Division III football season. In their sixth year under head coach Gabby Price, the team compiled a 7–3 record, outscored opponents by a total of 281 to 190, and made an appearance in the Eastern College Athletic Conference's (ECAC) Northeast Championship Bowl.

Quarterback James McCandless completed 70 of 144 passes for 1,080 yards, seven touchdowns, and seven interceptions. The team's leading rushers were running backs Julius Williams and Justin Lindie, who finished with 1,260 yards and 15 touchdowns and 830 yards and ten touchdowns, respectively. Wide receivers James Dobson and Roderic Johnson were the team's leading receivers with 493 and 309 yards, respectively.

In the team's sixth season under Price and since the restart, they grew from a winless team to a seven-win season and made their first-ever postseason bid in the Eastern College Athletic Conference's (ECAC) Northeast Championship Bowl against St. John Fisher.

=== Schedule ===
Date	Time	Opponent	Site	Result	Attendance	Source
September 6	1:00 p.m.	at Merrimack	Warrior Field; North Andover, MA	L 7–42	1,923	
September 13	1:00 p.m.	Utica	Winkin Sports Complex; Bangor, ME	W 34–17	1,100	
September 20	2:00 p.m.	at Norwich	Sabine Field; Northfield, VT	W 25–19	3,015	
September 27	1:00 p.m.	at American International	J. H. Miller Field; Springfield, MA	L 7–35	1,284	
October 4	1:00 p.m.	at Mount Ida	Alumni Field; Newton, MA	W 16–12	1,000	
October 11	1:00 p.m.	Springfield^{†}	Winkin Sports Complex; Bangor, ME	W 39–21	2,000	
October 18	12:00 p.m.	at Maritime	Reinhart Field; Throggs Neck, NY	W 49–14	1,200	
October 25	12:00 p.m.	Gallaudet	Winkin Sports Complex; Bangor, ME	W 49–0	950	
November 8	12:00 p.m.	at Becker	Alumni Field; Leicester, MA	W 48–13	295	
November 22	12:00 p.m.	St. John Fisher	Winkin Sports Complex; Bangor, ME (Northeast Championship Bowl)	L 7–17	300	
^{†}Homecoming

=== Roster ===
2008 Husson Eagles football team roster
Players
Coaches
Offense

Pos.	#	Name	Class
WR	1	Roderic Johnson	So
QB	3	Jack Hersom	Fr
QB	4	James McCandless	Fr
WR	6	Stephon Rivera	Fr
QB	7	Matt Boyd	Fr
WR	13	Jamari Young	Fr
WR	15	James Dobson	Jr
QB	18	Joe Gilbert	Fr
RB	19	Robert Allen	Fr
WR	21	Carlos Ortiz	Fr
RB	28	Justin Lindie	So
WR	30	Rasheed Shinaba	Fr
RB	31	Keyvin Moseley	Fr
RB	32	Anthony Witham	Jr
RB	33	Dom Griffin	Fr
WR	34	Ed Rodrigues	Fr
FB	36	Jamie Bonnell	Jr
RB	38	Bobby Pizzarelli	Fr
RB	39	William McGarrah	Fr
FB	41	Mike Toothaker	Fr
RB	42	Julius Williams	Jr
RB	47	Patrick Farrar	Fr
FB	49	Blake Krukiel	Jr
OL	50	Mike Austin	Jr
OL	53	Chris Smith	Sr
OL	55	Jon Benson (C)	Jr
OL	59	Kyle Wedge	Fr
OL	60	Ryan Esmail	Jr
OL	61	Ben Emmott	Jr
OL	62	Chris Ranco	Fr
OL	63	Brad Deuring	So
OL	64	Ryan Coleman	Fr
OL	65	Reed Montgomery	Fr
OL	66	Keith Paradis	So
OL	67	Richard Leclair	So
OL	68	Micah Raymond	Fr
OL	71	Jon Lange	Fr
OL	72	Jimmy Yarde	Jr
OL	73	Brandon Kenney	Fr
OL	76	John Carll	Fr
OL	77	John Morin	Fr
TE	80	Tim Nason	So
WR	81	Ben Grant	Fr
WR	82	Jake Rummel	Fr
TE	83	Tyler Doiron	Fr
TE	84	PJ Dowe	Jr
WR	85	Adam Beudoin	So
TE	86	Joe L'Heureux	So
WR	87	John Sindone	Fr
TE	88	Travis Barnes	So
TE	89	Nate Paradis	Sr

Defense

Pos.	#	Name	Class
DB	2	Darius Charlton (C)	Sr
DB	2	Thierry Joint	Fr
LB	5	Dana Tullis	So
DB	8	Byron Brown	Fr
DB	9	Doug Blades	Jr
DB	10	Chris M. Morris	Jr
LB	11	Bobby Gilbert (C)	Jr
LB	12	Nate Cairo	Jr
DB	16	Kyle Vanidestine	Fr
LB	17	Tom Hazelhurst	So
LB	20	John Brown	Fr
DB	22	Emeka Uwasomba	So
DB	23	John McNeil	Fr
DB	24	Ron Dozier	Fr
DB	25	Tom Hersom	So
DB	26	James Wood	Fr
DB	27	Mike Hersom	So
DB	29	Vaughn Johnson	So
DB	30	John Houghton	So
DL	34	Cory Smith (C)	Sr
DB	35	Keith Runne	Sr
LB	37	Jordan Caiani	So
LB	40	Obed Rinvil	So
DB	43	Nick Brown	Fr
LB	44	Dellon Douglas	Fr
LB	45	Jaizz Nealy	Fr
DL	51	Dominic Torch (C)	Sr
LB	52	Calan Bryant	Fr
LB	56	Earl Wilson	Fr
LB	57	EJ White	Fr
LB	58	Keenon Blindow	Jr
LB	69	Ryan Lapham	So
DL	70	Bryan Creamer	Jr
DL	74	Dustin Cole	Fr
DL	75	Pat Ouellette	Sr
DL	78	Tony Julian	So
DL	79	Irv Paulino	Fr
DL	91	Remington Montgomery	Fr
DL	92	Justin Michaud	So
DL	93	Wail Askia	Fr
DL	94	Nick Keene	Fr
DL	95	Kyle Romick	So
DL	96	Evan Gardner	Fr
DL	97	Chris Dalecki	Fr
DL	98	Isiah Underwood	Fr
DL	99	Sebastien Bejin	Fr

Special teams

Pos.	#	Name	Class
K	14	Darren Gauthier	Sr
K	46	Justin Paquet	Fr

Head coach

- Gabby Price

Coordinators/assistant coaches

- Nat Clark
  (Assistant head coach, special teams coordinator, & offensive line coach)
- Niles Nelson
  (Defensive coordinator & inside linebackers coach)
- Duncan Averill
  (Wide receivers coach & recruiting coordinator)
- Nate Quirion
  (Running backs coach)
- Tom Whitney
  (Defensive backs coach)
- Greg Marter
  (Defensive line coach)
- Walter Polky
  (Outside linebackers coach)
- Shane Rogers
  (Student assistant/defensive assistant)

Legend

- (C) Team captain
- (S) Suspended
- (I) Ineligible
- Injured
- Redshirt

Roster

== 2009 ==
2009 Husson Eagles football
- Conference: Eastern Collegiate Football Conference
- Record: 4–5 (3–3 ECFC)
- Head coach: Niles Nelson (1st season)
- Offensive coordinator: Niles Nelson (1st season)
- Defensive coordinator: Duncan Averill (1st season)
- Captains: Mike Austin; Jon Benson; Doug Blades; Bobby Gilbert; Julius Williams
- Home stadium: Winkin Sports Complex

2009 Eastern Collegiate Football Conference standings
	Conf.			Overall
Team	W		L	W		L
Norwich y$	6	–	0	8	–	3
Gallaudet	4	–	2	6	–	4
Mount Ida y	4	–	2	4	–	7
Maritime	3	–	3	6	–	4
Husson	3	–	3	4	–	5
Castleton	1	–	5	3	–	6
Becker	0	–	6	0	–	10
Anna Maria*	0	–	0	0	–	9
Championship: Norwich 49, Mount Ida 14
$ – Conference champion; y – Championship game participant; * – Anna Maria was accepted as a member of ECFC, but was not eligible for conference standings until 2010.

The 2009 Husson Eagles football team represented Husson University as a member of the Eastern Collegiate Football Conference (ECFC) during the 2009 NCAA Division III football season. In their first year under head coach Niles Nelson, the team compiled a 4–5 record (3–3 in ECFC play) and outscored opponents by a total of 275 to 201.

In June 2009, the team's only head coach since its restart, Gabby Price, shockingly announced his resignation. His resignation was seen as "completely unexpected," as the players and coaching staff did not find out until he handed in his resignation letter. He resigned, stating, "It just felt right at this time; a good time to step aside to that [Husson football] could grow in the right ways." He ended his tenure going 25–28, including 19–10 in his last three seasons. The team's defensive coordinator for the past five seasons, Niles Nelson, was chosen as Price's successor out of three potential candidates. Nat Clark, the teams assistant head coach, special teams coordinator, and offensive line coach, and Greg Marter, the team's defensive line coach were the two other candidates. Like Price, Nelson served as the head coach for Bangor High School. Alongside becoming the head coach, Nelson took on the roles of offensive coordinator and quarterbacks coach.

In 2007, it was announced that Husson's main conference, the North Atlantic Conference (NAC), would start sponsoring football in 2009 alongside Gallaudet, Norwich, Maritime, Becker, and Mount Ida. Due to NCAA Division III playoff rules, the NAC was not able to secure an automatic bid to the NCAA Division III tournament because at least seven members of the conference needed to be full-time members of the NAC. In 2009, only Husson and recently Castleton's newly created football team met the criteria. Instead, Husson, the previous six mentioned teams, and Anna Maria's start-up team created the Eastern Collegiate Football Conference (ECFC), a single-sport football conference that would become eligible for postseason play in 2011.

Quarterback Jack Hersom completed 58 of 103 passes for 656 yards, five touchdowns, and eight interceptions. The team's leading rusher was running back Julius Williams, who finished with 1,042 yards and 11 touchdowns. Wide receiver James Dobson was the team's leading receiver with 228 yards on 15 catches alongside two touchdowns.

After the season, running back Julius Williams and offensive lineman Jon Benson earned First-team All-ECFC honors, while linebackers Bobby Gilbert and Keenon Blindlow were named to the Second-team All-ECFC.

=== Schedule ===
Date	Time	Opponent	Site	Result	Attendance	Source
September 12	1:00 p.m.	at Merrimack*	Warrior Field; North Andover, MA	L 0–23	661	
September 19	1:00 p.m.	Anna Maria* (Note: Despite Anna Maria being accepted as a member of the ECFC, the game played against them did not count towards conference standings.)	Winkin Sports Complex; Bangor, ME	W 63–12	1,000	
September 26	12:00 p.m.	Maritime	Winkin Sports Complex; Bangor, ME	W 35–26	400	
October 3	12:00 p.m.	at Gallaudet	Hotchkiss Field; Washington, D.C.	L 7–10	500	
October 10	1:30 p.m.	at Springfield*	Stagg Field; Springfield, MA	L 14–39	2,138	
October 17	1:00 p.m.	Norwich^{†}	Winkin Sports Complex; Bangor, ME	L 19–20	1,250	
October 24	12:00 p.m.	at Castleton	Spartan Stadium; Castleton, VT	W 35–20	1,564	
October 31	1:00 p.m.	at Mount Ida	Mt. Ida Athletic Center; Newton, MA	L 28–29	500	
November 7	12:00 p.m.	Becker	Winkin Sports Complex; Bangor, ME	W 74–22	300	
*Non-conference game; ^{†}Homecoming

=== Roster ===
2009 Husson Eagles football team roster
Players
Coaches
Offense

Pos.	#	Name	Class
WR	1	Roderic Johnson	Jr
WR	2	Alfonza Brooks	Fr
QB	3	Jack Hersom	So
QB	4	James McCandless	So
WR	5	Victor McKenzie	So
QB	6	Jamari Young	So
WR	7	John Sindone	So
QB	12	Cody Goddard	Fr
WR	14	Sylvester Mitchell	Fr
WR	15	James Dobson	Sr
QB	17	Ivan Somerville	Fr
WR	19	Audie Murphy	Fr
QB	20	Kash Keezer	Fr
WR	24	Dexter Saulsby	Fr
RB	26	Byron Jackson	Fr
RB	28	Justin Lindie	Jr
RB	30	David Ingraham	Fr
RB	32	Chris Fox	Fr
TE	33	Darrell Wiggins	Fr
FB	36	Jamie Bonnell	Sr
RB	38	Andy Mondesir	Jr
FB	41	Mike Toothaker	Jr
RB	42	Julius Williams (C)	Sr
FB	45	Brett Kwaak	Fr
RB	47	Michael Zeigler	Fr
RB	49	Dominique Bailey	Fr
OL	50	Mike Austin (C)	Sr
OL	55	Jon Benson (C)	Sr
OL	57	Zach Vitti	Fr
OL	60	Ryan Esmail	Sr
OL	61	Ben Emmott	Sr
OL	62	Chris Ranco	So
OL	63	Brad Deuring	So
OL	64	Ryan Coleman	So
OL	65	Nick Flash	Fr
OL	66	Taylor Dube	Fr
OL	68	CJ Breidt	Fr
OL	71	Jon Lange	So
OL	72	Cody McLean	Fr
OL	73	Jason Cross	Sr
OL	74	Dustin Cole	So
OL	75	Derek Riley	Fr
OL	76	Corbyn Cooke	Fr
OL	77	Brandon Kenney	So
WR	81	Vincent Henry	Fr
WR	82	Antonio Hernandez	Fr
TE	83	Tyler Doiron	So
TE	84	PJ Dowe	Sr
WR	85	Tyler Pembroke	Fr
WR	87	Daeshod Perry	Fr
TE	88	Travis Barnies	Jr
WR	89	Rasheed Shinaba	So

Defense

Pos.	#	Name	Class
DB	2	Thierry Joint	So
DB	8	Fendy Tropnas	Fr
DB	9	Doug Blades (C)	Sr
LB	11	Bobby Gilbert (C)	Sr
DB	13	Derek Daley	Fr
DB	16	Kyle Vanidestine	So
DB	18	Merton Foss	Fr
DB	20	Wes Murphy	Fr
DB	21	Ramael Barton	Sr
LB	22	Emeka Uwasomba	Jr
DB	23	James Wood	So
DB	25	Tom Hersom	So
DB	27	Mike Hersom	So
DB	29	Vaughn Johnson	Jr
DB	30	Tim Stover	Fr
CB	31	DaVaughan Mitchell	Fr
LB	32	Dylon Therrien	Fr
LB	34	Sodney Theodore	Sr
LB	39	Dillon Shaw	So
LB	40	Obed Rinvil	Jr
DB	42	Daniel Forbes	Fr
DB	43	Nick Brown	So
LB	44	Dellon Douglas	So
LB	44	Marcus Leek	Fr
LB	46	Adam Rush	Fr
DB	48	John Houghton	Jr
DL	51	Eric Stiles	Fr
DL	52	TJ Jenkins	Fr
LB	53	Dan Kenyherez	Fr
DL	54	Chris Dalecki	So
LB	56	Pat Small	Fr
LB	58	Keenon Blindow	Sr
DL	59	Derrick Snead	Fr
LB	69	Henry Moy	Fr
DL	70	Joe Brown	Fr
DL	78	Tony Julian	Jr
DL	79	Devin Bellany-Lee	Fr
LB	80	Tim Nason	Jr
DL	91	Richard Drew Roselle	Fr
DL	92	Brent Thibbetts	Fr
DL	94	Nick Keene	So
DL	95	Kyle Romick	So
DL	96	Evan Gardner	So
DL	98	Dennis Kanarkiewicz	Fr
DL	99	Tyler Cooke	Fr

Special teams

Pos.	#	Name	Class
K	10	Carlos Romero	Fr
K	35	Kyle Markarian	Fr
K	62	Nathan Conway	Fr

Head coach

- Niles Nelson

Coordinators/assistant coaches

- Duncan Averill
  (Defensive coordinator)
- Shawn Demaray
  (Offensive line coach)
- Tom Whitney
  (Wide receivers coach)
- Greg Marter
  (Defensive line coach)
- Darius Charlton
  (Defensive backs coach)
- Walter Polky
  (Running backs coach)
- Bruno Dorismond
  (Linebackers coach)
- Matt Benson
  (Student assistant/tight ends coach)
- Shane Rogers
  (Student assistant/defensive assistant)

Legend

- (C) Team captain
- (S) Suspended
- (I) Ineligible
- Injured
- Redshirt

Roster
