= Lee St. Hilaire (American football) =

American football player (1983–2004)

No. 13, 11
- Position: Quarterback

Personal information
- Born: March 14, 1983; Augusta, Maine, U.S.
- Died: February 17, 2004 (aged 20); Bangor, Maine, U.S.
- Listed height: 6 ft 0 in (1.83 m)
- Listed weight: 200 lb (91 kg)

Career information
- High school: Winthrop (Winthrop, Maine)
- College: Maine (2002); Husson (2003)

Lee Matthew St. Hilaire (March 14, 1983 – February 17, 2004) was an American college football quarterback. He played for Maine and Husson. He was considered one of the greatest players in Maine high school history. He died by suicide following his redshirt freshman year.

== Early life ==
St. Hilaire was born on March 14, 1983, to Jon and Jean (née Laliberte) St. Hilaire in Augusta, Maine. His parents got divorced when he was in fourth grade. St. Hilaire attended Winthrop High School in Winthrop, Maine, and was a four-year member of the school's football team. He began to gain notoriety as a quarterback when he was still in grade school. He was known for his throwing prowess from a young age. He was the team's starter as a freshman at only 15 years old. As a sophomore in 1999, he led the team to the Maine Class C championship at Gerry Poulin Memorial Field. The team lost after a fourth-quarter field goal from Mattanawcook Academy in the final minute of the game. After the season, he was named to the Central Maine Football All-Stars Second-team Offense.

In St. Hilaire's junior season, he again led the team to a stellar season. He led the team to an undefeated 12–0 state championship season, the team's first state championship since 1975. Despite not being known as a running quarterback, St. Hilaire used his legs to help lead the team over Maine Central Institute. He finished the game going 14-of-28 for 168 passing yards and 46 rushing yards. The success carried over into the next season as the team amassed a winning streak of 22 games before falling to Boothbay Region High School in the Maine Class C Championship, which was the team's third appearance in St. Hilaire's four years as the starter. Following the season, St. Hilaire was named Maine's Sunday Telegram and Sun Journal (Lewiston, Maine)'s MVPs. He finished first as Maine's all-time passing leader and finished 28th all-time in the nation for passing yards with 8,272 and 30th all-time in touchdown passes with 87. His 63 percent completion percentage ranked 11th all-time in the nation ahead of notable quarterbacks like Heath Shuler and Ty Detmer. He was regarded as the "best quarterback to ever play in Maine." He also earned the James J. Fitzpatrick Trophy, which is awarded to Maine's top high school football player. He became the first non-Class A winner of the prestigious award. After his graduation, Winthrop retired his number 11 jersey.

Alongside playing football, St. Hilaire was a member of the cooperative Hall-Dale High School and Winthrop hockey team, which was coached by his uncle. He finished as the school's all-time scorer.

== College career ==
=== Maine ===
Despite St. Hilaire's historic high school career, due to his size he was not heavily recruiting coming out of Winthrop High School. Teams that were interested were mainly from the NCAA Division I-AA's Atlantic 10 Conference (A-10). On February 7, 2002, he signed his letter of intent to play college football for the University of Maine after considering taking a prep year with Bridgton Academy. He joined his former Winthrop teammate, Clyde Moody. He went to Maine with hopes to compete for the backup position behind incumbent starter Jake Eaton. On November 1, 2002, after receiving a redshirt, the Maine sports information office released a press release stating that St. Hilaire had withdrawn from the school.

After leaving the team, St. Hilaire returned to his alma mater, Winthrop High School, as an assistant football coach. In a quote given to the Kennebec Journal, he admitted that he was not prepared for life as a Division I athlete:

"It's 24 hours a day for five years...I can't do that right now. There is too much in my life right now that I don't want to commit to football like that." and "I had a lot of pressure on me to go to college in the first place, and maybe that is not what I wanted to do...I had a lot of pressure on me, people telling me (Division I) is where I should be and Division II or III is not for you."

St. Hilaire described his life as "non-stop football, interrupted by classes and studying," and that just was not what he wanted with his life. When being recruited to Maine, St. Hilaire and head coach Jack Cosgrove discussed how many people don't like Division I life and that it was a "hard life" and was "not much fun." The constant football on top of classes led him to burn out, but helping with his high school team felt like something he wanted to do. Despite not being entirely sure of what he wanted to do afterwards, St. Hilaire knew he wanted to be involved with coaching and that he was considering potentially playing Division II or Division III football with Husson's start-up team being a potential landing spot.

=== Husson ===
In 2003, St. Hilaire enrolled at Husson College to play college football in the team's inaugural season under head coach Gabby Price. He was named team captain alongside Jim Tribou and Nate Roberts. In Husson's first game, despite losing 42–14 to Alfred State, he threw for 160 yards and two touchdowns, including the program's first since restarting. In the team's first-ever home game, St. Hilaire split time with former Oak Hill High School graduate David Chase after suffering from turf toe in the second quarter. They both threw touchdown passes in the team's 38–35 homecoming loss to Mount Ida. X-rays after the game came back negative for any breaks in St. Hilaire's football and he was cleared to play the following week. He finished the season starting all seven games, all of which were losses, and went 79-of-172 for 960 yards, five touchdowns, and six interceptions.

=== Statistics ===
College statistics
Year	Team	Games		Passing								Rushing			
Year	Team	GP	Record	Cmp	Att	Pct	Yds	Avg	TD	Int	Rtg	Att	Yds	Avg	TD
2002	Maine	DNP—Redshirt													
2003	Husson	7	0–7	79	172	45.9	960	5.6	5	6	95.4	44	-111	-2.5	0
Career		7	0–7	79	172	45.9	960	5.6	5	6	95.4	44	-11	-2.5	0

== Death ==
On February 17, 2004, St. Hilaire was taken to Eastern Maine Medical Center in Bangor, Maine, after suffering from a gunshot wound to his stomach in his apartment that he and his girlfriend, Tia Pomerleau, lived in together in Bangor. He was pronounced dead upon arrival to the hospital with his death being ruled a suicide following an investigation. His death was a shock to his peers as he was described as someone who "never stopped smiling."

St. Hilaire's memorial service was held in the gymnasium of Winthrop High School. He was given an open casket funeral where more than 1,000 people attended. Husson's chaplain reverend Robert T. Carlson, who was with St. Hilaire's family in the hospital, was in charge of the service. Speakers at the service included Husson head coach Gabby Price, former Winthrop High School head coach Norm Thombs, and St. Hilaire's uncle, Perley Laliberte. He was buried in Glenside Cemetery in Winthrop, Maine.

St. Hilaire was one of five players that played for Winthrop High School who committed suicide from 2003 to 2005.

== See also ==
- List of gridiron football players who died during their careers
