= Jack Moran (American football) =

American athletics coach and writer (1907–1980)

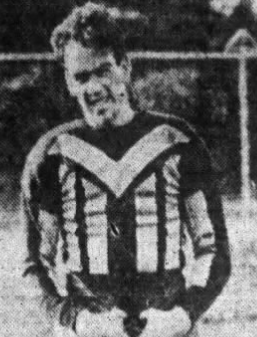
- Moran in 1930

Biographical details
- Born: May 13, 1907
- Died: October 14, 1980 (aged 73); Miami, Florida, U.S.
- Education: University of Maine (1931)

Playing career

Football
- 1928, 1930: Maine

Basketball
- c. 1920s: Maine
- Position: Halfback (football)

Coaching career (HC unless noted)

Football
- 1929: Maine (assistant)
- 1932–1934: Maine School of Commerce
- 1935: Maine (freshmen)

Men's basketball
- 1930–1931: Beal College
- 1931–1935: Maine School of Commerce

Women's basketball
- 1930–1931: Beal College

Head coaching record
- Overall: 5–15–4 (football)

John William Moran (May 13, 1907 – October 14, 1980) was an American athletics coach and sports editor.

Moran was born on May 13, 1907. He attended the University of Maine and participated in football and basketball. As a halfback for the football team, Moran gained fame for his stellar play.

In 1929, while ineligible to play for the team, Moran served as an assistant football coach for the team. After graduating in 1931, he served as the head men and women's basketball coach for Beal College. In 1932, he took over the positions of head football and basketball coach for the Bangor Maine School of Commerce—now known as Husson University. In three seasons as head football coach he led the team to an overall record of 5–15–4. He left in 1935 to become the freshmen coach for his alma mater, Maine.

Throughout Moran's life he worked as a sports writer for newspapers throughout Maine. In 1944, Moran was named executive secretary for the Governor of Maine, Horace Hildreth. In 1965, he received the Sevellon Brown Memorial Award at a meeting of the New England Associate Press News Executives Association for his work with the Bangor Daily News, where he was working as the managing editor. He retired in 1980 after 41 years.

Moran died in Miami on October 14, 1980.

== Head coaching record ==
=== Football ===
Year	Team	Overall	Conference	Standing	Bowl/playoffs
Maine School of Commerce Penmen (Independent) (1932–1934)
1932	Maine School of Commerce	2–4–1			
1933	Maine School of Commerce	2–6–1			
1934	Maine School of Commerce	1–5–2			
Maine School of Commerce:		5–15–4			
Total:		5–15–4			
