= Niles Nelson =

American football coach (1937–2025)

Biographical details
- Born: July 4, 1937; Winchester, Massachusetts, U.S.
- Died: February 19, 2025 (aged 87); Anderson, South Carolina, U.S.

Playing career
- 1955–1958: Maine
- Position: End

Coaching career (HC unless noted)
- c. 1960s: Maine (assistant)
- 1966–1968: Florida State (assistant)
- ?: Millis HS (MA)
- ?: Dennis-Yarmouth HS (MA)
- ?–1977: South Mecklenburg HS (NC)
- 1978–1980: Orono HS (ME)
- 1981–1984: Rhode Island (OC/OL)
- 1985–1986: Bangor HS (ME)
- 1996–1998: Nichols (OC/OL)
- 1999: Nichols (DC)
- 2000: The Citadel (assistant)
- 2001–2003: Methodist (OL)
- 2004–2008: Husson (DC)
- 2009–2010: Husson

Head coaching record
- Overall: 5–14 (college)

Accomplishments and honors

Awards
- All-Yankee Conference (1958)

Niles Herbert Nelson (July 4, 1937 – February 19, 2025) was an American football coach. He served as the head football coach at Husson University in Bangor, Maine from 2009 to 2010. He became the program's second head coach in 2009 after the surprising resignation by Gabby Price, the first head coach who had served since 2003. Nelson was fired after the 2010 season.

Nelson earned his Ph.D. in Physical Education at Florida State University, where he also served as a graduate assistant coach for the Seminoles football team. He has coached at both the high school and collegiate levels, with stops including Rhode Island, Methodist, The Citadel, and Nichols.

Nelson died on February 19, 2025, in Anderson, South Carolina, after suffering from Alzheimer's disease. He was predeceased by his wife of 66 years, who died in 2021.

== Head coaching record ==
=== College ===
| Year | Team | Overall | Conference | Standing | Bowl/playoffs |
|---|---|---|---|---|---|
Husson Eagles (Eastern Collegiate Football Conference) (2009–2010)
| 2009 | Husson | 4–5 | 3–3 | T–4th | |
| 2010 | Husson | 1–9 | 1–6 | 7th | |
| Husson: | | 5–14 | 4–9 | | |
| Total: | | 5–14 | | | |
