= Maine School of Commerce Indians football, 1932–1938 =

American college football season

1932–1938 Maine School of Commerce Indians football
- Conference: Independent (1932–1936, 1938)
- Head coach: Jack Moran (1932–1934); Into Suomi (1935); Lloyd Hatfield (1936) Chesley H. Husson (1938)

The Maine School of Commerce Indians football program, 1932–1938 represented Bangor Maine School of Commerce—now known as Husson University—during the 1930s in college football as an independent. The team was led by four different head coaches: Jack Moran, who held the position from 1932 to 1934, Into Suomi, who held the position in 1935, Lloyd Hatfield, who held the position in 1936, and Chesley H. Husson, who held the position in 1938. This was the first iteration of football at Husson, as the team disbanded after the 1936 season due to low participation and returned briefly in 1938 as a six-man football team, but did not field a full team again until 2003. The six-man team's stats are not reflected in the overall records or stats.

The team was commonly referred to as the Penmen until 1936, when it was then known as the Indians.

== Decade overview ==
Year	Head coach	Overall record	Points scored	Points allowed	Delta
1932	Jack Moran	2–4–1	39	29	+10
1933	Jack Moran	2–6–1	38	140	-102
1934	Jack Moran	1–5–2	13	92	-79
1935	Into Suomi	0–6	13	253	-240
1936	Lloyd Hatfield	0–6	0	67	-67
Total		5–27–4	103	581	-478

== 1932 ==
1932 Maine School of Commerce Penmen football
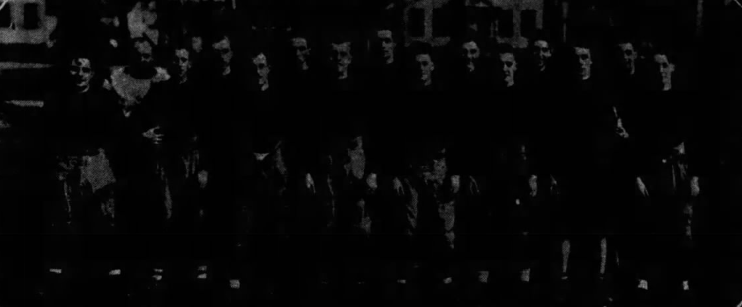
- Conference: Independent
- Record: 2–4–1
- Head coach: Jack Moran (1st season)

The 1932 Maine School of Commerce Penmen football team represented Bangor Maine School of Commerce—now known as Husson University—as an independent during the 1932 college football season. In their first year under head coach Jack Moran, the team compiled a 2–4–1 record and outscored opponents by a total of 39 to 29.

The inaugural team consisted of 15 players, of whom only five had played football in high school. The team began practice for its debut against Ricker Classical Institute in mid-September. Head coach Jack Moran previously was a star halfback for Maine.

Husson University accredits 1932 as the first-ever iteration of the Bangor team despite the Bangor branch of the Shaw Business College having fielded a team in the early 1900s.

=== Schedule ===
Date	Opponent	Site	Result	Source
September 25	at Ricker Classical Institute	Houlton, ME	L 0–6	
October 1	at George W. Stearns High School	Millinocket, ME	L 0–7	
October 12	at Bridgeton Academy reserves	North Bridgton, ME	L 0–6	
October 15	at Higgins Classical Institute	Charleston, ME	L 0–12	
October 22	at East Maine Conference Seminary junior varsity	Bucksport, ME	T 0–0	
November 5	at Greenville High School	Greenville, ME	W 20–0	
November 11	at Eastern State Normal School	Castine, ME	W 19–7	

=== Roster ===
Maine School of Commerce 1932 roster
Guards: William H. Howatt; Stanford A. Stromback; Tackles: Patrick A. McCloskey; Richard D. Kelly; John P. Grosvenor	Center: Everett L. Hutchings; Ends: Durgin A. McKusick; Bernard A. MacKenzie; Herbert F. Moulton	Backs: Phillip S. Grossman; Into M. Suomi; Oscar C. Suomi; Myron E. Graves; Wilfred J. McCloskey

The lone substitute was Colby N. Wood.

== 1933 ==
1933 Maine School of Commerce Penmen football
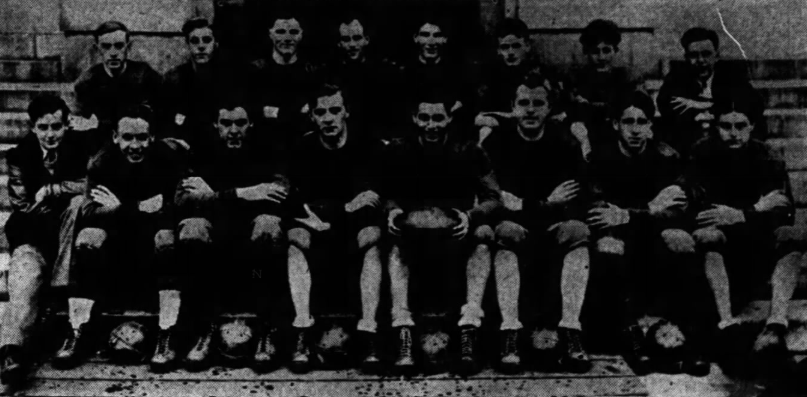
- Conference: Independent
- Record: 2–6–1
- Head coach: Jack Moran (2nd season)
- Captain: Wilfred "Freddy" McCloskey

The 1933 Maine School of Commerce Penmen football team represented Bangor Maine School of Commerce—now known as Husson University—as an independent during the 1933 college football season. In their second year under head coach Jack Moran, the team compiled a 2–6–1 record and was outscored by opponents by a total of 38 to 140.

Since the team did not have a home field, they traveled a total of 1,222 miles combined across Maine for all nine games of the season. The team generally practiced at the local YMCA in Bangor. In the last few weeks of the season, the gym was shared with the school's basketball team.

=== Schedule ===
Date	Time	Opponent	Site	Result	Source
September 23		at Ricker Classical Institute	Houlton, ME	L 0–26	
September 30		at Bridgton Academy	North Bridgton, ME	L 0–57	
October 7		at John Bapst Memorial High School	Legion Field or Victory Field; Brewer, ME	L 0–12	
October 14		at Washington State Normal (ME)	Machias, ME	L 0–6	
October 20	3:00 p.m.	at Coburn Classical	Libby Field; Waterville, ME	L 0–6	
October 28		at Higgins Classical Institute	Charleston, ME	L 6–20	
November 3		at Maine Central Institute	Pittsfield, ME	W 7–0	
November 10		at Eastern State Normal School	Castine, ME	T 13–13	
November 18		at Bar Harbor High School	Bar Harbor, ME	W 12–0	

=== Roster ===
Maine School of Commerce 1933 roster
Guards: Joseph Havey; Richard "Tiger" Hughes; Colby Wood; Tackles: John McPike; Stan Strombach	Center: Everett L. Hutchings; Ends: Burt McKenzie; Harland Randall	Backs: Cecil Miller; Leo Paradis; Phil Grossman; Johnny Wilson; Into Suomi; Wilfred "Freddy" McCloskey

The reserves were Delbert Fitzpatrick and Joe Havey.

== 1934 ==
1934 Maine School of Commerce Penmen football
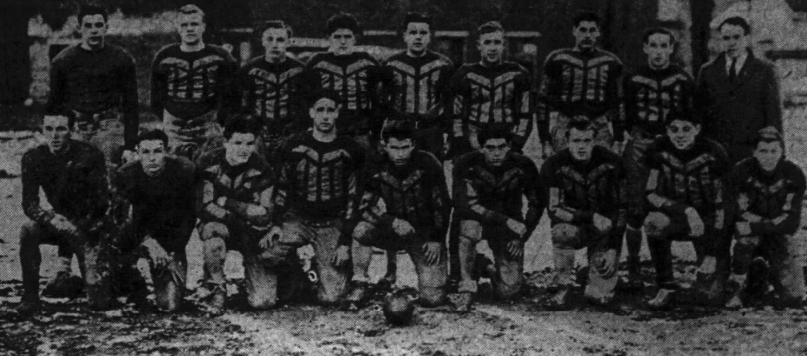
- Conference: Independent
- Record: 1–5–2
- Head coach: Jack Moran (3rd season)
- Captain: Everett Hitchings

The 1934 Maine School of Commerce Penmen football team represented Bangor Maine School of Commerce—now known as Husson University—as an independent during the 1934 college football season. In their third year under head coach Jack Moran, the team compiled a 1–5–2 record and was outscored by opponents by a total of 13 to 92.

=== Schedule ===
Date	Time	Opponent	Site	Result	Source
September 29		at Ricker Classical Institute	Houlton, ME	L 0–19	
October 6		at Washington State Normal (ME)	Machias, ME	T 0–0	
October 13	10:00 a.m.	at Coburn Classical	Libby Field; Waterville, ME	W 13–6	
October 19		at Bowdoin junior varsity	Brunswick, ME	L 0–13	
October 26		at Higgins Classical Institute	Charleston, ME	L 0–13	
November 2		at Maine freshmen	Freshmen field; Orono, ME	L 0–21	
November 9	2:45 p.m.	at Colby freshmen	Seaverns Field; Waterville, ME	T 0–0	
November 17		at Madison High School	Madison, ME	L 0–20	

The team's roster consisted of captain Everett Hitchings, Leo Paradis, Robert McEachern, Clarence Burnett, Donald Jamieson, Bernard Jenkins, Merton Lane, Leonard Page, Alvah Ford, James Regis, Edward Clukey, John Beptst, Alfred Louder, Harland Randall, Stanford Stromback, Elmer Wright.

== 1935 ==
1935 Maine School of Commerce Penmen football
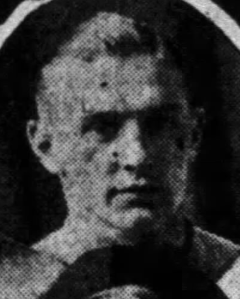
- Conference: Independent
- Record: 0–6
- Head coach: Into Suomi (1st season)

The 1935 Maine School of Commerce Penmen football team represented Bangor Maine School of Commerce—now known as Husson University—as an independent during the 1935 college football season. In their first year under head coach Into Suomi, the team compiled a 0–6 record and was outscored by opponents by a total of 13 to 253.

=== Schedule ===
Date	Time	Opponent	Site	Result	Source
September 28		at Ricker Classical Institute	Houlton grounds; Houlton, ME	L 0–53	
October 5		at Maine Central Institute	Pittsfield, ME	L 0–46	
October 11		at Bowdoin junior varsity	Brunswick, ME	L 0–68	
October 17 (Note: Game was originally to be played on October 18, but was moved to October 17 to give Coburn Classical more time to recover for their next game against Maine Central Institute.)		at Coburn Classical	Waterville, ME	L 6–41	
October 28	3:20 p.m.	at Colby freshmen	Seaverns Field; Waterville, ME	L 0–25	
November 1		at Maine freshmen	Freshmen field; Orono, ME	L 7–20	

== 1936 ==
1936 Maine School of Commerce Indians football
- Conference: Independent
- Record: 0–6
- Head coach: Lloyd Hatfield (1st season)

The 1936 Maine School of Commerce Indians football team represented Bangor Maine School of Commerce—now known as Husson University—as an independent during the 1936 college football season. In their first year under head coach Lloyd Hatfield, the team compiled a 0–6 record and was outscored by opponents by a total of 0 to 68.

This was the first season that the team was referred to as the Indians opposed to the Penmen.

The school announced after the season that they were dropping football as a sport due to low participation.

=== Schedule ===
Date	Time	Opponent	Site	Result	Source
September 26		at Maine Central Institute	Pittsfield, ME	L 0–12	
October 3	2:30 p.m.	at Aroostook State Normal School	Northern Maine fair grounds; Presque Isle, ME	L 0–6	
October 16	2:45 p.m.	at Coburn Classical	Averill Field (Note: Game was originally to be played on Libby Field but was relocated due to poor field conditions.); Waterville, ME	L 0–15	
October 28		at Ricker Classical Institute	Houlton, ME	L 0–14	
November 2		at Maine freshmen	Freshmen field; Orono, ME	L 0–13	
November 5		at Higgins Classical Institute	Charleston, ME	L 0–7	

== 1938 ==
1938 Maine School of Commerce Indians football
- Conference: Independent
- Record: 0–3
- Head coach: Chesley H. Husson (1st season)

The 1938 Maine School of Commerce Indians football team represented Bangor Maine School of Commerce—now known as Husson University—as an independent six-man football team. In the team's first year under Chesley H. Husson, the team compiled a 0–3 record and was outscored by opponents by a total of 25 to 77.

After a one-year hiatus, the school announced it would bring back a football team, this time in six-man football instead of the full sport. The team only played for one season and did not count towards any varsity stats or records.

=== Schedule ===
Date	Time	Opponent	Site	Result	Attendance	Source
October 8		at Eastern State Normal School	Mary Snow Field; Castine, ME	L 6–19		
October 19	3:00 p.m.	at Aroostook State Normal School	Northern Maine fair grounds; Presque Isle, ME	L 12–20		
October 27	2:30 p.m.	at Eastern State Normal School	Mary Snow Field; Castine, ME	L 7–38	1,000+	

The players were led by the school's principal, Chesley H. Husson. The roster included Beryle Whidden, Carleton Scott, Arthur Butler, Dick Morgrage, Vaughan Ellison, Sherman Mills, Glendon Bowden, Henry Homer, Andy Laughton, Foster Simpson, Wendall Marr, Eddie Webb, Cleo King, Winthrop Nickerson, and James Buck.
