= Jonathan Michaeles =

American football coach (born c. 1969)

Current position
- Title: Wide receivers coach
- Team: Bowdoin
- Conference: NESCAC

Biographical details
- Born: c. 1969 (age 56–57); Sturbridge, Massachusetts, U.S.
- Education: Bates College (1992)

Playing career
- 1988–1991: Bates
- Position: Wide receiver

Coaching career (HC unless noted)
- 1992–1993: Bates (GA)
- 1994–1996: Allegheny (WR/TE/K)
- 1997: Penn (TE)
- 1998: Fordham (WR)
- 1999–2001: Saint Anselm (OC/QB)
- 2002–2003: Saint Anselm (AHC/OC/QB)
- 2004–2011: Colby (OC)
- 2012–2017: Colby
- 2018–present: Bowdoin (WR)

Head coaching record
- Overall: 14–35

Jonathan Michaeles (born c. 1969) is an American college football coach. He is the wide receivers coach for Bowdoin College, a position he has held since 2018. He was the head football coach for Colby College from 2012 to 2017.

== Career ==
Michaeles played college football for Bates as a wide receiver from 1988 to 1991. After his graduation he served as a graduate assistant for Bates. In 1994, he was hired as the wide receivers coach, tight ends coach, and kickers coach for Allegheny. In 1997, he joined NCAA Division I-AA Penn as the team's tight ends coach. In 1998, he moved to Fordham as the teams wide receivers coach. In 1999, Michaeles was hired as the offensive coordinator and quarterbacks coach for Saint Anselm. In 2002, he was promoted to assistant head coach while maintaining his previous roles.

In 2004, Michaeles was hired as the offensive coordinator for Colby under first-year head coach Ed Mestieri. When Mestieri resigned following the 2011 season, Michaeles was named interim head coach. He was promoted to full-time head coach before the 2012 season. In six seasons as head coach he led the team to a 14–35 record with his best season coming in 2013 when he led the team to a 4–4 record. He resigned following the 2017 season.

In 2018, Michaeles joined fellow New England Small College Athletic Conference (NESCAC) Bowdoin as the team's wide receivers coach.

== Head coaching record ==
Year	Team	Overall	Conference	Standing	Bowl/playoffs
Colby Mules (New England Small College Athletic Conference) (2012–2017)
2012	Colby	3–5	3–5	7th	
2013	Colby	4–4	4–4	T–5th	
2014	Colby	2–6	2–6	T–7th	
2015	Colby	1–7	1–7	10th	
2016	Colby	3–5	3–5	T–6th	
2017	Colby	1–8	1–8	9th	
Colby:		14–35	14–35		
Total:		14–35			
