= Sean Murphy (American football) =

American football coach (born c. 1978)

Biographical details
- Born: c. 1978 (age 47–48); Eliot, Maine, U.S.
- Education: Plymouth State College; California University of Pennsylvania

Playing career

Football
- 1996–1999: Plymouth State

Lacrosse
- 1997-2000: Plymouth State

Coaching career (HC unless noted)

Football
- 2000: Plymouth State (DL)
- 2001: Bowdoin (WR)
- 2002–2003: Bowdoin (DB)
- 2004–2007: Dickinson (co-DC/LB)
- 2008–2009: Bullis School (MD)
- 2010: Husson (AHC/DC)
- 2011–2012: Husson

Head coaching record
- Overall: 2–18 (college); 4–16 (high school)

Sean Murphy (born c. 1978) is an American college football coach. He was the head football coach for Husson University from 2011 to 2012 and the Bullis School from 2008 to 2009. He also coached for Plymouth State, Bowdoin, and Dickinson. He played college football and lacrosse for Plymouth State.

== Head coaching record ==
=== College ===
Year	Team	Overall	Conference	Standing	Bowl/playoffs
Husson Eagles (Eastern Collegiate Football Conference) (2011–2012)
2011	Husson	0–10	0–7	8th	
2012	Husson	2–8	1–6	T–7th	
Husson:		2–18	1–13		
Total:		2–18			

=== High school ===
Year	Team	Overall	Conference	Standing	Bowl/playoffs
Bullis School Bulldogs () (2008–2009)
2008	Bullis School	2–8	0–3	5th	
2009	Bullis School	2–8	0–3	5th	
Bullis School:		4–16	0–6		
Total:		4–16			
