= Ed Mestieri =

American football coach (born c. 1953)

Current position
- Title: Inside linebackers coach
- Team: Husson
- Conference: CNE

Biographical details
- Born: c. 1953 (age 72–73); Wareham, Massachusetts, U.S.
- Education: Springfield College (1976); Norwich University (1977)

Playing career
- 1972–1975: Springfield
- Position: Defensive tackle

Coaching career (HC unless noted)
- 1976–1978: Norwich (OL)
- 1979–1980: Dartmouth (GA)
- 1981–1988: Norwich (OC/OL)
- 1989–?: Colby (OL)
- ?–2003: Colby (OC/OL)
- 2004–2011: Colby
- 2012–2013: Maine (DA)
- 2015–present: Husson (ILB)

Head coaching record
- Overall: 31–33

Edward Mestieri (born c. 1953) is an American college football coach. He is the inside linebackers coach for Husson University; a position he has held since 2015. He was the head football coach for Colby College from 2004 to 2011 after being a long-time assistant for fifteen years. He also coached for Norwich, Dartmouth, and Maine. He played college football for Springfield as a defensive tackle.

== Head coaching record ==
Year	Team	Overall	Conference	Standing	Bowl/playoffs
Colby Mules (New England Small College Athletic Conference) (2004–2011)
2004	Colby	6–2	6–2	T–2nd	
2005	Colby	7–1	7–1	2nd	
2006	Colby	2–6	2–6	T–7th	
2007	Colby	2–6	2–6	T–8th	
2008	Colby	3–5	3–5	7th	
2009	Colby	4–4	4–4	5th	
2010	Colby	4–4	4–4	T–4th	
2011	Colby	3–5	3–5	T–6th	
Colby:		31–33	31–33		
Total:		31–33			
