= Winthrop High School =

Winthrop High School may refer to:

- Winthrop High School (Maine)
- Winthrop High School (Massachusetts)
