= Nat Clark =

American football coach (born 1977)

Current position
- Title: Head coach
- Team: Husson
- Conference: CNE
- Record: 33–29

Biographical details
- Born: January 19, 1977 (age 49); Bangor, Maine, U.S.
- Education: University of Maine (2000, 2012)

Playing career
- 1996–1999: Maine
- Positions: Offensive lineman, tight end

Coaching career (HC unless noted)
- 2000–2001: Bangor HS (ME) (OL/LB)
- 2002–2008: Husson (ST/OL)
- 2009–2012: Bangor HS (ME) (OL/LB)
- 2013–2018: Husson (AHC/ST/OL)
- 2019–present: Husson

Administrative career (AD unless noted)
- 2004–2009: Husson (assistant AD)

Head coaching record
- Overall: 33–29
- Bowls: 0–2

Accomplishments and honors

Awards
- ECFC Assistant Coach of the Year (2016)

Nathaniel Clark (born January 19, 1977) is an American college football coach. He is the head football coach for Husson University, a position he has held since 2019. He previously coached for Bangor High School. He played college football for Maine as an offensive lineman and tight end.

== Head coaching record ==
Year	Team	Overall	Conference	Standing	Bowl/playoffs
Husson Eagles (Commonwealth Coast Football) (2019–2021)
2019	Husson	4–6	4–3	T–3rd	
2020–21	No team—COVID-19				
2021	Husson	7–3	4–2	T–3rd	
Husson Eagles (Commonwealth Coast Conference / Conference of New England) (2022–present)
2022	Husson	5–6	4–2	2nd	L New England
2023	Husson	7–3	3–2	3rd	
2024	Husson	6–5	3–2	T–2nd	L Fusion
2025	Husson	4–6	3–4	5th	
2026	Husson	0–0	0–0		
Husson:		33–29	21–15		
Total:		33–29			
