= WHSN =

Bangor, Maine; United States
- Broadcast area: Penobscot County, Maine
- Frequency: 89.3 MHz

Programming
- Format: Alternative rock

Ownership
- Owner: Husson University

History
- First air date: 1974
- Call sign meaning: Husson University

Technical information
- Licensing authority: FCC
- Facility ID: 28151
- Class: A
- ERP: 3,000 watts
- HAAT: 25.8 meters (85 ft)
- Transmitter coordinates: 44°49′46.3″N 68°47′37.1″W

Links
- Public license information: Public file; LMS
- Webcast: Listen live
- Website: www.whsn-fm.com

WHSN (89.3 FM) is a non-commercial FM radio station broadcasting an alternative rock format. Licensed to Bangor, Maine, the station is owned by Husson University. The station is run by the students of the New England School of Communications, which is located on the campus of Husson University. With its 3,000 watt signal, WHSN is heard around Bangor, Brewer, Old Town and Orono, including on the campus of the University of Maine.

== History ==
WHSN signed on the air in 1974. The station was run by Husson University from its start until the mid-1980s when NESCom moved from its Broadway campus to the Husson campus. At first, it was powered at 10 watts, audible only around the campus and surrounding neighborhood. It later improved its power to 140 watts. In 2006, the station upgraded its signal to its current 3,000 watts and moved its transmitter to behind the NESCom Building.

In July 2016, WHSN was named a finalist for a Marconi Award for Non-Commercial Station Of The Year.
