= Lynne Coy-Ogan =

American academic administrator

7th President of Husson University
- Designate
- Assumed office July 1, 2024
- Preceded by: Robert A. Clark

Personal details
- Children: 2
- Education: Boston University; Johns Hopkins University; Liberty University

Lynne Coy-Ogan is an American academic administrator, who has been the seventh president of Husson University since July 2024. She was its provost from 2009 to 2024.

== Early life and education ==
Coy-Ogan is from Bangor, Maine. She earned a bachelor's degree in elementary and special education from Boston University. She completed a master's in school counseling at the Johns Hopkins School of Education. Coy-Ogan received an Ed.D. in educational leadership from Liberty University. Her 2009 dissertation was titled, Perceived Factors Influencing the Pursuit of Higher Education among First-Generation College Students. Ellen Lowrie Black was her doctoral advisor.

== Career ==
Coy-Ogan worked for Montgomery County Public Schools. She was later a principal in the Bangor School Department and Regional School Unit 68. Coy-Ogan joined Husson University in 2005 as the dean of the School of Education. She was promoted to provost and Senior Vice President for Academic Affairs in 2009. She held this position until July 1, 2024, when she became the seventh president of the university. The first female to serve in the role, she succeeded Robert A. Clark.

== Personal life ==
Coy-Ogan has two daughters.
