= Gabby Price =

American football player and coach (born 1949)

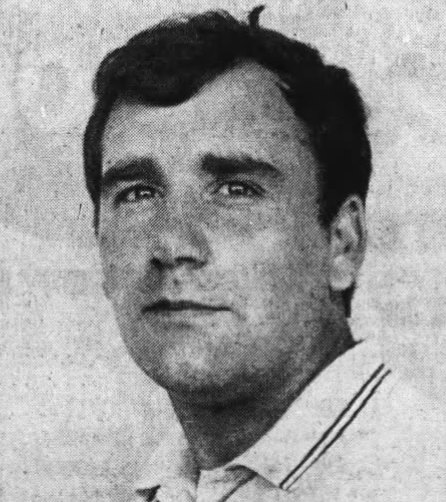
- Price in 1976

Biographical details
- Born: April 2, 1949 (age 77); Bangor, Maine, U.S.
- Education: University of Maine (1973)

Playing career
- 1969: Rutgers
- 1970–1972: Maine
- Positions: Quarterback, defensive back

Coaching career (HC unless noted)
- 1973–1975: Bangor HS (ME) (backfield)
- 1976–1984: Bangor HS (ME)
- 1992–2000: Bangor HS (ME)
- 2002–2008: Husson
- 2013–2018: Husson

Administrative career (AD unless noted)
- 2002–2008: Husson

Head coaching record
- Overall: 72–45 (college); 129–52–1 (high school)
- Bowls: 0–2
- Tournaments: 1–4 (NCAA D-III playoffs)

Accomplishments and honors

Championships
- 5 ECFC (2014–2018)

Awards
- 4× ECFC Coach of the Year (2014, 2016–2018)

Jonathan "Gabby" Price (born April 2, 1949) is an American former football coach. He served two stints as the head football coach at Husson University in Bangor, Maine, from a position from 2002 to 2008 and 2013 to 2019, compiling a record of 72–45. He was the first head football coach at Husson. Price was the head football coach at Bangor High School in Bangor, Maine from 1976 to 1984 and again from 1992 to 2000, amassing a mark of 129–52–1.

Price served as Husson's athletic director from 2002 to 2008.

== Head coaching record ==
=== College ===
Year	Team	Overall	Conference	Standing	Bowl/playoffs	D3^{#}
Husson Braves / Eagles (NCAA Division III independent) (2003–2008)
2003	Husson	0–7				
2004	Husson	2–7				
2005	Husson	4–4				
2006	Husson	6–4				
2007	Husson	6–3				
2008	Husson	7–3			L ECAC Northeast Bowl	
Husson Eagles (Eastern Collegiate Football Conference) (2013–2018)
2013	Husson	5–5	4–3	T–4th		
2014	Husson	8–2	7–0	1st	L NCAA Division III First Round	
2015	Husson	7–3	6–1	T–1st	L ECAC Chapman Bowl	
2016	Husson	9–2	7–0	1st	L NCAA Division III First Round	
2017	Husson	10–2	7–0	1st	L NCAA Division III Second Round	25
2018	Husson	8–3	6–0	1st	L NCAA Division III First Round	
Husson:		72–45	37–4			
Total:		72–45				
National championship Conference title Conference division title or championship game berth
