= New England School of Communications =

Private liberal arts college in Bangor, Maine

- Other name: NESCom
- Type: College of Husson University
- Established: 1981
- Dean: Marie Hansen
- Administrative staff: 92 (total all categories)
- Location: Bangor, Maine, U.S. 44°49′44″N 68°47′35″W
- Campus: Suburban, 200 acres (81 ha)
- Mascot: Eagle
- Website: nescom.husson.edu

The New England School of Communications (NESCom) is a private, liberal arts college located in Bangor, Maine. The school focuses exclusively on undergraduate education in communications. The school has an admissions rate of 66%. It has been located on the campus of Husson University since 1985, and has been owned by Husson since 1997 as a wholly owned subsidiary. NESCom had its own financial aid and accreditation until Spring 2014; for the Fall 2014 semester, Husson University took over these responsibilities.

== History ==
The New England School of Communications began as the New England School of Broadcasting (NESB, nicknamed "Nessbee") in 1981. It had an educational mission to train students for positions in the broadcasting industry. The school's first campus was in a downtown location called the "Broadcast House" in 1983. The location proved to be temporary as the school's growth required a bigger campus. In 1985, NESB moved to a location on the campus of what was then Husson College and continued to grow by providing housing, dining, a gymnasium and other campus amenities. NESCom and Husson merged in 1997, with NESCom becoming a subsidiary. In 2001, a new Communication Center was established for the school with a new wing added in 2004. Over the course of the 2000s and 2010s, Husson and NESCom continued to integrate further. By 2006, Husson students were allowed to take NESCom courses, while NESCom students took their general education courses in other Husson buildings. In 2011, NESCom students became able to compete on Husson athletics teams. In 2014, NESCom was officially recognized as a college within Husson University.

== Campus ==
The George Wildey Communication Center houses all NESCom programs except Entertainment Production, which utilizes the Gracie Theatre. WHSN, an alternative radio station licensed the university, broadcasts from the Wildey Center. General education courses often occur in the Beardsley Meeting House or Peabody Hall, and occasionally in other buildings on the Husson campus.

== Academic program ==
NESCom offers a Bachelor of Science Degree program with concentrations available in Audio Engineering, Live Sound Engineering, Graphic/Visual Design, WebMedia, Journalism, Sports Journalism, Marketing Communications, Radio Broadcasting (including campus station WHSN), and Video Production.

== Student life ==
NESCom students are allowed to participate in the vast majority of Husson clubs, societies, athletics teams and organizations. However, there are some extracurriculars that are only open to NESCom students, such as the NESCom chapter of the Audio Engineering Society.
