= Husson Eagles football =

College football team

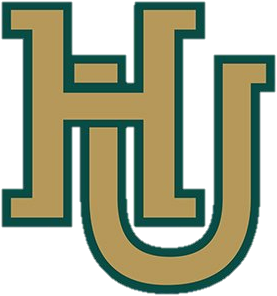
- First season: 1932; 94 years ago (Note: The program was discontinued in 1939. Then it was relaunched in 2003; 23 years ago.)
- Athletic director: John Sutyak
- Head coach: Nat Clark; 6th season, 33–29 (.532)
- Location: Bangor, Maine
- Stadium: Winkin Sports Complex (capacity: 3,000)
- NCAA division: Division III
- Conference: CNE
- Colors: Green and Vegas gold
- All-time record: 113–126–4 (.473)
- Bowl record: 0–4 (.000)

Conference championships
- 5
- Rivalries: New England (ME)
- Mascot: Eagles
- Website: hussoneagles.com/football

The Husson Eagles football team represents Husson University in college football at the NCAA Division III level. The Eagles are members of the Conference of New England (CNE), fielding its team in the CNE since 2019. The Eagles play their home games at the Winkin Sports Complex in Bangor, Maine.

Their head coach is Nat Clark, who took over the position for the 2019 season.

== History ==
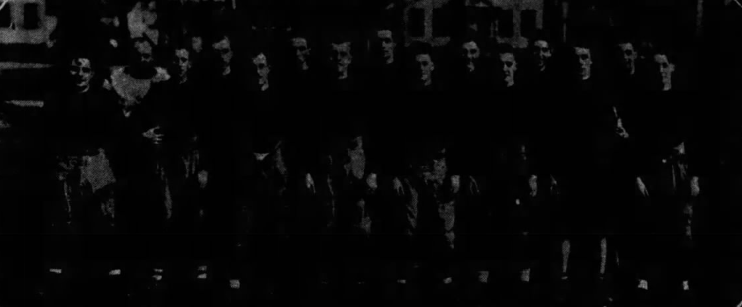
The inaugural 1932 Maine School of Commerce football team

Husson established their football team in 1932 despite the Bangor branch of the Shaw Business School fielding a team in the early 1900s. The team was known as the Maine School of Commerce and finished their inaugural season with a 2–3–1 record. The team's first-ever win came against Greenville High School with a final score of 20–0. The team played until 1936 before being discontinued due to low participation. The program was restarted as a six-man football team in 1938, but only lasted one season.

In 2002, Husson announced they would revive the football team and would begin play in 2003. The team's inaugural coach was chosen to be Gabby Price, who previously coached Bangor High School.

== Conference affiliations ==
- Independent (2003–2008)
- Eastern Collegiate Football Conference (2009–2018)
- Commonwealth Coast Conference / Conference of New England (2019–present)

== Championships ==
=== Conference championships ===
Husson claims 5 conference titles, the most recent of which came in 2018.

Year	Conference	Overall record	Conference record	Coach
2014	Eastern Collegiate Football Conference	8–2	7–0	Gabby Price
2015†	Eastern Collegiate Football Conference	7–3	6–1	Gabby Price
2016	Eastern Collegiate Football Conference	9–2	7–0	Gabby Price
2017	Eastern Collegiate Football Conference	10–2	7–0	Gabby Price
2018	Eastern Collegiate Football Conference	8–3	6–0	Gabby Price

† Co-champions

== Postseason games ==
=== NCAA Division III playoff games ===
Husson has appeared in the Division III playoffs four times, with an overall record of 1–4.

Year	Round	Opponent	Result
2014	First Round	MIT	L, 20–27
2016	First Round	Western New England	L, 27–44
2017	First Round; Second Round	Springfield; Delaware Valley	W, 23–21; L, 15–37
2018	First Round	RPI	L, 14–38

=== Bowl games ===
Husson has participated in four bowl games, and has a record of 0–4.

Season	Coach	Bowl	Opponent	Result
2008	Gabby Price	ECAC Bowl	St. John Fisher	L, 7–17
2015	Gabby Price	ECAC Bowl	Salve Regina	L, 39–42
2022	Nat Clark	New England Bowl	Plymouth State	L, 20–21
2024	Nat Clark	Fusion Bowl	SUNY Maritime	L, 14–21

== List of head coaches ==
=== Key ===
Key to symbols in coaches list
General		Overall		Conference		Postseason (Note: Although the first Rose Bowl Game was played in 1902, it has been continuously played since the 1916 game, and is recognized as the oldest bowl game by the NCAA. "—" indicates any season prior to 1916 when postseason games were not played.)	
No.	Order of coaches (Note: A running total of the number of head coaches, with coaches who served separate tenures being counted only once. Interim head coaches are represented with "Int" and are not counted in the running total. "—" indicates the team played but either without a coach or no coach is on record. "X" indicates an interim year without play.)	GC	Games coached	CW	Conference wins	PW	Postseason wins
DC	Division championships	OW	Overall wins	CL	Conference losses	PL	Postseason losses
CC	Conference championships	OL	Overall losses	CT	Conference ties	PT	Postseason ties
NC	National championships	OT	Overall ties (Note: Overtime rules in college football were introduced in 1996, making ties impossible in the period since.)	C%	Conference winning percentage		
†	Elected to the College Football Hall of Fame	O%	Overall winning percentage (Note: When computing the win–loss percentage, a tie counts as half a win and half a loss.)				

=== Coaches ===
List of head football coaches showing season(s) coached, overall records, conference records, postseason records, championships and selected awards
No.	Name	Season(s)	GC	OW	OL	OT	O%	CW	CL	C%	PW	PL	DC	CC	NC	Awards
1	Jack Moran	1932–1934	24	5	15	4	0.292	–	–	–	–	–	–	–	–	–
2	Into Suomi	1935	6	0	6	0	.000	–	–	–	–	–	–	–	–	–
3	Lloyd Hatfield	1936	6	0	6	0	.000	–	–	–	–	–	–	–	–	–
4	Chesley H. Husson (Note: Husson was the head coach for the six-man team and his three losses do not count towards the varsity record or stats)	1938	3	0	3	0	.000	–	–	–	–	–	–	–	–	–
5	Gabby Price	2003–2008; 2013–2018	117	72	45	0	0.615	37	4	0.902	1	3	–	5	–	–
6	Niles Nelson	2009–2010	19	5	14	0	0.263	4	9	0.308	–	–	–	–	–	–
7	Sean Murphy	2011–2012	20	2	18	0	0.100	1	13	0.071	–	–	–	–	–	–
8	Nat Clark	2019–present	62	33	29	0	0.532	21	15	0.583	–	–	–	–	–	–

== Year-by-year results ==
National champion	Conference champion	Bowl game berth	Playoff berth

Season	Year	Head coach	Association	Division	Conference	Record					Postseason	Final ranking
Season	Year	Head coach	Association	Division	Conference	Overall		Conference			Postseason	Final ranking
Season	Year	Head coach	Association	Division	Conference	Win	Loss	Finish	Win	Loss	Postseason	Final ranking
Husson Braves / Eagles
2003	2003	Gabby Price	NCAA	Division III	Independent	0	7	–	–	–	—	—
2004	2004	Gabby Price	NCAA	Division III	Independent	2	7	–	–	–	—	—
2005	2005	Gabby Price	NCAA	Division III	Independent	4	4	–	–	–	—	—
2006	2006	Gabby Price	NCAA	Division III	Independent	6	4	–	–	–	—	—
2007	2007	Gabby Price	NCAA	Division III	Independent	6	3	–	–	–	—	—
2008	2008	Gabby Price	NCAA	Division III	Independent	7	3	–	–	–	L ECAC Northeast Bowl	—
2009	2009	Niles Nelson	NCAA	Division III	ECFC	4	5	T–4th	3	3	—	—
2010	2010	Niles Nelson	NCAA	Division III	ECFC	1	9	7th	1	6	—	—
2011	2011	Sean Murphy	NCAA	Division III	ECFC	0	10	8th	0	7	—	—
2012	2012	Sean Murphy	NCAA	Division III	ECFC	2	8	T–7th	1	6	—	—
2013	2013	Gabby Price	NCAA	Division III	ECFC	5	5	T–4th	4	3	—	—
2014	2014	Gabby Price	NCAA	Division III	ECFC	8	2	1st	7	0	L NCAA Division III First Round	—
2015	2015	Gabby Price	NCAA	Division III	ECFC	7	3	T–1st	6	1	L ECAC Chapman Bowl	—
2016	2016	Gabby Price	NCAA	Division III	ECFC	9	2	1st	7	0	L NCAA Division III First Round	—
2017	2017	Gabby Price	NCAA	Division III	ECFC	10	2	1st	7	0	L NCAA Division III Second Round	25
2018	2018	Gabby Price	NCAA	Division III	ECFC	8	3	1st	6	0	L NCAA Division III First Round	—
2019	2019	Nat Clark	NCAA	Division III	CCC / CNE	4	6	4th	4	3	—	—
2020 season canceled due to COVID-19
2021	2021	Nat Clark	NCAA	Division III	CCC / CNE	7	3	4th	4	2	—	—
2022	2022	Nat Clark	NCAA	Division III	CCC / CNE	5	6	2nd	4	2	L New England Bowl	—
2023	2023	Nat Clark	NCAA	Division III	CCC / CNE	7	3	T–2nd	3	2	—	—
2024	2024	Nat Clark	NCAA	Division III	CCC / CNE	6	5	T–2nd	3	2	L Fusion Bowl	—
2025	2025	Nat Clark	NCAA	Division III	CCC / CNE	4	6	5th	3	4	—	—
