= Winthrop High School (Maine) =

School district in Winthrop, Kennebec County, Maine, United States

Location
- 211 Rambler Road; Winthrop, Maine 04364; United States; 44.30036°N 69.98456°W

Information
- School type: Public high school
- Motto: Knowledge is Power
- Established: 1855; 171 years ago
- School district: Winthrop Public Schools
- Superintendent: Dr. Becky Foley
- Principal: Jay Dufour
- Teaching staff: 20.80 (FTE)
- Enrollment: 232 (2023–2024)
- Student to teacher ratio: 11.15
- Campus type: Rural
- Colors: Green and white
- Athletics conference: Mountain Valley Conference
- Mascot: Rambler
- Nickname: Ramblers
- Yearbook: The Winthrop Winner
- Communities served: Winthrop
- Website: whs.winthropschools.org

Winthrop High School is a public high school in Winthrop, Maine.
