= Beal University =

Private university in Bangor, Maine, U.S.

- Motto: Sed vitae discimus
- Type: Private
- Established: 1891; 135 years ago
- President: Sheryl DeWalt
- Faculty: 30
- Students: 429
- Location: Bangor, Maine, United States; 44.7865°N 68.7860°W
- Campus: Suburban (20 acres)
- Colors: Blue & Orange & Grey
- Website: www.beal.edu

Beal University is a private university in Bangor, Maine, United States. It specializes in professional programs such as healthcare and business. It was established as a business school in 1891.

== History ==
The institution was first established as the Bangor Business School by Mary E. Beal and several partners on October 23, 1891. In the first year of operation, the Bangor Business School was attended by less than 25 students and housed on the second floor of the YMCA. Early offerings of the college consisted of courses in banking, accounting, finance, business arithmetic, business writing, commercial law, penmanship, shorthand, and typing.

Less than 6 months later, in January 1892, attendance had quickly grown to over 100 students and more space was required. It was at this point that the shorthand and typing departments moved to a secondary location on the Exchange Street Block.

12 years after the movement of the shorthand and typing departments, Mary E. Beal took ownership of the Shorthand Department of the Bangor Business School. It became Miss Beal's School of Shorthand and Typing, consisting of about 30 students. Some time later, on July 14, 1922, the school was sold to Francis G. Lee, who changed the name to the Beal College of Business.

The next 20 years held much growth for Beal College. In 1928 it was quoted by Harris B. Coe as being, "not only the largest of its kind in Bangor, but also one of the largest in the State". After multiple administrations the name of the school was changed again, to Beal Business College. By its 50th anniversary, Beal Business College offered multiple two-year degree programs, including subjects such as business, administration, secretarial studies, and bookkeeping.

Authorized by the legislature of the State of Maine, Beal College began offering an associate degree in science on April 28, 1968. Two years later, in 1970, Beal College was accredited as a junior college of business by the Accreditation Commission for Business Schools.

The institution acquired its current name in 2021.

== Academics ==
Beal University utilizes a scheduling system referred to as a "Term System". Under this system the academic year is divided into six eight-week terms. Each term starts every 8 weeks and the university runs classes year-round, allowing students to graduate in about one-third less time compared to a traditional school that operates on a 16-week semester schedule. Under the Term System, full-time students take two classes per 8-week term and are considered FTE (Full Time Enrollment).

The university offers multiple diplomas designed to be completed in 9–14 months, as well as associate, bachelor's, and master's degrees. Beal University offers a selection of programs including Healthcare, Nursing, Cannabis Business Administration and Sciences, Health Information Management, Health Sciences, Business Programs, Addiction Counseling, and Welding.

In addition to their traditional courses, Beal University also expanded into hybrid and completely online programs. Every program has a hybrid option, where students can complete the first 4–6 months of classes completely online. Several associate and bachelor's degree programs are online such as Cannabis Business & Sciences, Business Administration, RN to BSN, Biomedical Science, Healthcare Sciences, and Health Information Management. Two master's degree programs are offered online as well, Master of Science in Nursing (MSN), and Master of Business Administration (MBA).

== Accreditation ==
Beal is accredited by the Accrediting Commission of Career Schools and Colleges. The medical assisting program is further accredited by the American Association of Medical Assistants and the Commission on Accreditation of Allied Health Education Programs and graduates can receive official certification status. The Health Information Technology program is accredited by the Commission on Accreditation for Health Informatics and Information Management Education and are eligible for Registered Health Information Technician (RHIT) certification. The Associates in Nursing program (ADN) is an approved educational program in Professional Nursing by the Maine Board of Nursing.
