= Husson University =

Private university in Bangor, Maine, US

- Former names: Shaw Business College Bangor branch (1898–1926); Bangor Maine School of Commerce (1926–1947); Husson College (1947–2008)
- Motto: Character & Humility
- Type: Private university
- Established: 1898; 128 years ago
- Endowment: $35.8 million (2025)
- President: Lynne Coy-Ogan
- Provost: Victor Brown
- Faculty: 136
- Students: 3,065 (Fall 2022)
- Undergraduates: 2,429 (Fall 2022)
- Postgraduates: 636 (Fall 2022)
- Location: Bangor, Maine, United States; 44°49′37.07″N 68°47′35.60″W
- Campus: Suburban (208 acres)
- Colors: Cyprus Green & Barley Corn Gold
- Nickname: Eagles
- Sporting affiliations: NCAA Division III – NAC
- Mascot: Baldwin
- Website: husson.edu
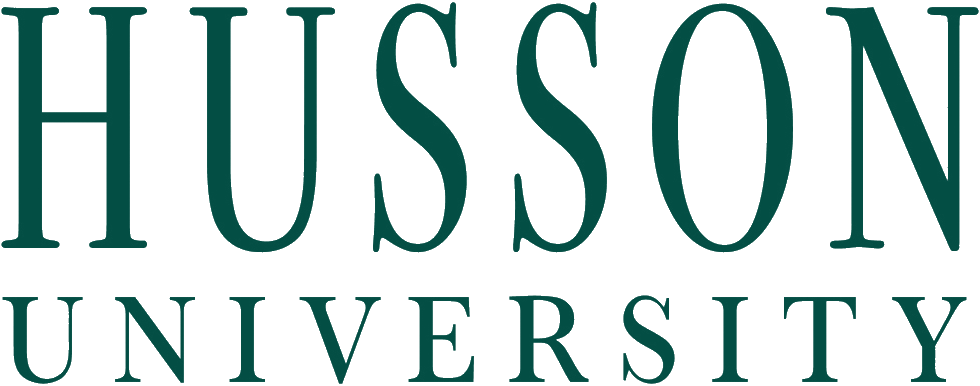

Husson University is a private university in Bangor, Maine, United States. It offers undergraduate and graduate degrees and as of Fall 2022 had a total enrollment of 3,065 students, including 636 graduate students in master's and doctoral programs.

Husson University is one of four universities in the Bangor area (the University of Maine at Augusta, the University of Maine, and Beal University are the others) and the largest private university in the region. Husson also offers a number of online programs. The university previously operated satellite campuses around the state. The last of these campuses, at Northern Maine Community College, was shuttered in 2021. Students were transitioned to Husson's online programs.

== History ==
Husson University traces its roots to November 1, 1898, when the already existing Shaw Business College announced it was opening a branch in Bangor, Maine, alongside the college's Augusta and Houlton branches. The Bangor branch was located on the second floor of a building in downtown Bangor. The enrollment bloomed after one year. In 1926, the Bangor branch changed ownership and was renamed to the Bangor Maine School of Commerce, becoming a branch of the Maine School of Commerce alongside the other former branches of Shaw Business School. Despite the initial bloom, enrollment remained low until after World War II, when its reputation grew as a business school. In 1933, the Bangor school was purchased by Chesley H. Husson who was working as the school's principal. On December 27, 1946, following a stockholders meeting the college was renamed to Husson College. The name change became effective on January 2, 1947.

In 1953 the Maine Legislature authorized the school to grant Bachelor of Science degrees. It subsequently became Husson University in 2008.

Today the University has four colleges, and two schools: the College of Business, the College of Health and Education, the College of Science and Humanities, the School of Pharmacy, and the New England School of Communications. The New England School of Communications, known by its abbreviation NESCom, was an independent school acquired by Husson in 1997, and was separately accredited and operated semi-autonomously with control over its own tuition, hiring, admissions, and graduation requirements until 2014.

Since 2000, undergraduate enrollment has increased five to ten percent with each incoming class. In response, the University continues to add a significant number of new faculty to its ranks. Today, students graduate having trained both in the specialties of their chosen fields and in how those fields fit into a broader cultural context. Husson ranks 54th on U.S. News & World Report's ranking of top universities in the United States for social mobility.

== Accreditation ==
Husson University is accredited by the New England Commission of Higher Education (NECHE). In addition, specific programs have their own professional accreditations or approvals:

- International Accreditation Council for Business Education (IACBE) for their business programs.
- Commission on Collegiate Nursing Education (CCNE) for their bachelor's and master's degree programs in nursing.
- Accreditation Council for Occupational Therapy Education (ACOTE) for their occupational therapy programs.
- Accreditation Council for Pharmacy Education (ACPE) for their Doctor of Pharmacy program.
- Council for Accreditation of Counseling & Related Educational Programs (CACREP) for their Clinical Mental Health Counseling and School Counseling graduate programs.
- Commission on Accreditation in Physical Therapy Education (CAPTE) for their School of Physical Therapy.
- American Board of Physical Therapy Education Residency (ABPTRFE). The School of Physical Therapy is a member of this organization.
- State of Maine Department of Education has approved the school counseling and teacher education programs in the School of Education.
- National Board for Certified Counselors has approved the master's degree programs in clinical mental health and school counseling to provide continuing professional education and development.

== Campus ==
The Husson University Campus in Bangor includes the Newman Gymnasium, the Winkin Sports Complex, Robert O'Donnell Commons (the College of Health and Education is located here), Peabody Hall (including the Sawyer Library and the Ross Furman Student Center), Harold Alfond Hall (opened in 2021, home of the College of Business and School of Law), the Dickerman Dining Center (renovated in 2012), the Dyke Center for Family Business, the Wildey Communications Center, the Beardsley Meeting House which houses the 500-seat Gracie Theatre, and the Darling Living & Learning Center which houses upperclassmen in suites and holds offices and classrooms on the ground floor. There are four residence halls: Hart Hall, Bell Hall, Carlisle Hall, and the Darling Living & Learning Center, a LEED Silver targeted student residence and academic building which opened in the fall of 2012. Two walking trails circle the outer perimeter and offer scenic walks through the Maine forest.

=== Gracie Theatre ===
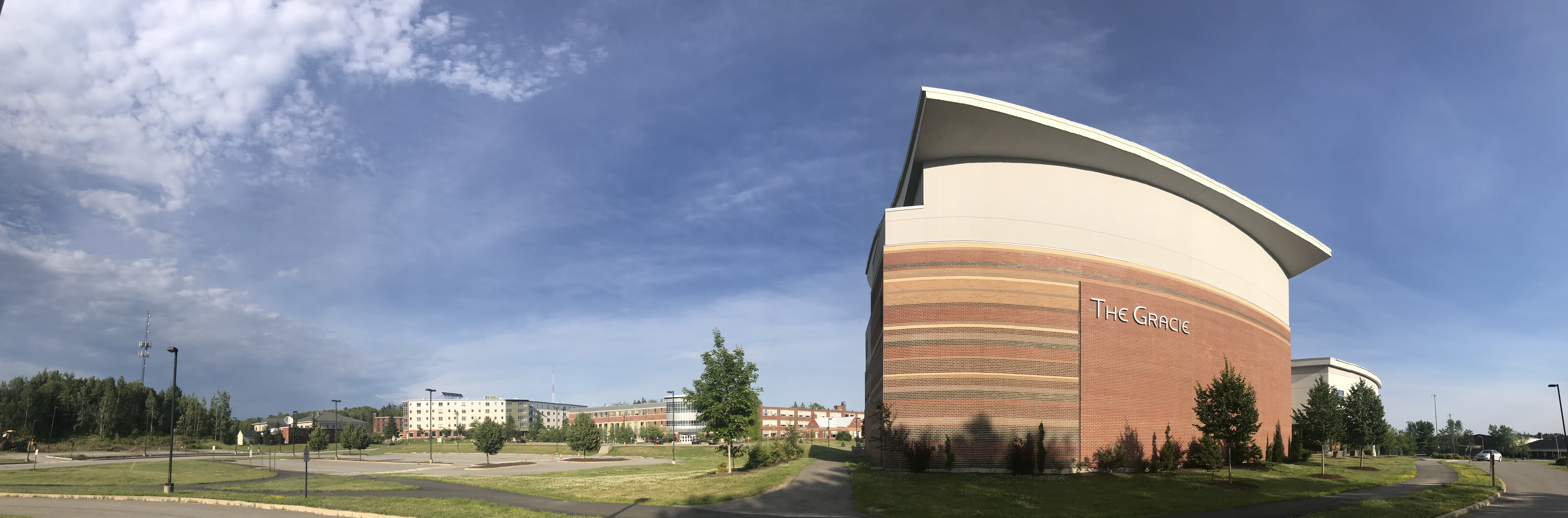
Gracie Theatre

The Gracie Theatre, located in the Beardsley Meeting House, is a 500-seat multipurpose venue. Opera singer Richard Troxell, comedian Bob Marley, and the Bangor Symphony Orchestra have all performed in the Gracie. The New England School of Communications has staged musicals (including West Side Story and The Who's Tommy) there and operates the theatre during other events.

=== Winkin Sports Complex ===
Winkin Sports Complex is home of the Husson University baseball, field hockey, and football teams. The ballpark has a capacity of 3,000 people and opened in 2004. It was formerly the home of the Bangor Lumberjacks. The complex was named in honor of retired head baseball coach John Winkin. In 2003, the city of Bangor contributed $381,000 towards the building of the complex. In 2004, the Lumberjacks played their only season at the complex. In May 2016, renovations were made which increased padding on the field at the cost of approximately $1 million.

== Student life ==
There are dozens of student clubs and organizations, such as Public Relations Student Society of America (PRSSA), Student Government, The English Society, Accounting Society, Criminal Justice Club, OPTS (Organization of Physical Therapy Students), OOTS (Organization of Occupational Therapy Students), the Organization of Student Nurses, Outdoors Club, Student Newspaper, Husson University Theatre, GAMERS, Q&A, Technology Club, Student Veterans Association, Running Club, Ski & Snowboard Club, Pep Band, Audio Engineering Society, Cru, and Husson College Republicans. The University also owns WHSN 89.3 FM, an alternative rock station operated by the New England School of Communications.

Husson currently has two active sororities and one fraternity.

== Athletics ==
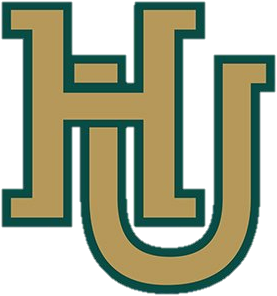
Husson athletics monogram

Husson University teams are known as the Eagles. They were known as the Braves until 2004. The university is a member of the NCAA Division III and fields twenty one varsity sports teams in the North Atlantic Conference (primary), Commonwealth Coast Football (football) and the Great Northeast Athletic Conference (swimming and diving). Sports offered include men's & women's soccer, men's & women's lacrosse, men's & women's cross country, men's & women's basketball, men's football, women's field hockey, men's and women's swimming & diving, men's and women's golf, women's outdoor track & field, women's indoor track & field, baseball, softball, and women's volleyball. Husson University also has three spirit teams including Cheer Team, Dance Team, and Pep Band.

On November 30, 2023, the NCAA released a ruling from the Division III Committee on Infractions regarding an investigation of ethical conduct violations by a former Husson University swimming & diving head coach. The former head coach knowingly allowed an unnamed student athlete to participate in physical therapy and team activities while clocked in for work as a student assistant in late 2022. This violation resulted in $1,385 of benefits to the student athlete from 103 hours of unperformed labor. Husson University self-reported the violation in December 2022 after discovering the violation and cooperated with the investigation. The NCAA ruling levied a punishment of one year of probation on the school and fined the university $1,250.

== Notable alumni ==
- Tarren Bragdon, think tank founder and former Maine state legislator
- James R. Flynn, country music songwriter
- Phil Harriman, political commentator and former Maine state legislator
- Ray Harrington, comedian
- George Hasay, former Pennsylvania state legislator
- Peter Lyford, Maine state legislator
- Terry Morrison, businessman and former Maine state legislator
- Paul LePage, 74th Governor of Maine
- Anne C. Perry, former member of the Maine House of Representatives
- Joseph F. Underwood, member of the Maine House of Representatives
- Arthur Verow, former Member of the Maine House of Representatives
- Edward Youngblood, banker and former Maine state legislator

== Notable staff ==
- William Cohen (born 1940), attorney, author, and former United States Secretary of Defense, and member of the U.S. Senate and U.S. House of Representatives.
- Susan Collins (born 1952), U.S. Senator
- Lynne Coy-Ogan, seventh president of Husson University
- Pat LaMarche (born 1960), Green Party vice-presidential candidate in the 2004 U.S. presidential election
- David C. Webster (born 1947 or 1948), member of the Maine House of Representatives
