= Harper Davis =

American football player and coach (1925–2020)

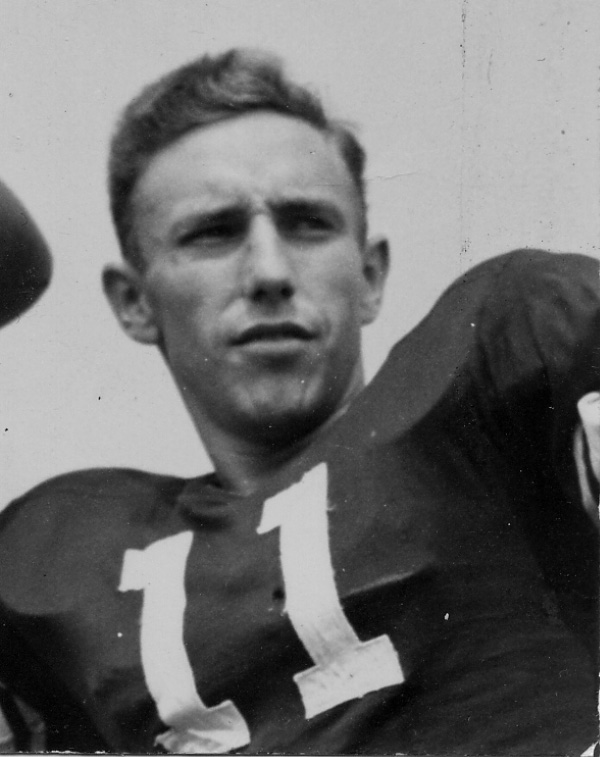

No. 88, 19, 25
- Position: Defensive back

Personal information
- Born: December 11, 1925; Clarksdale, Mississippi, U.S.
- Died: December 26, 2020 (aged 95); Jackson, Mississippi, U.S.
- Listed height: 5 ft 11 in (1.80 m)
- Listed weight: 173 lb (78 kg)

Career information
- High school: Clarksdale
- College: Mississippi State (1945–1948)
- NFL draft: 1949: 2nd round, 16th overall pick

Career history

Playing
- Los Angeles Dons (1949); Chicago Bears (1950); Green Bay Packers (1951)

Coaching
- West Point HS (MS) (1953) Head coach; Columbus Lee HS (1955) Head coach; Mississippi St. (1956-1963) Assistant; Millsaps (1964-1988) Head coach; Jackson Academy (MS) (1990-2006) Assistant

Awards and highlights
- First-team All-SEC (1945)

Career NFL/AAFC statistics
- Interceptions: 11
- Fumble recoveries: 1
- Total touchdowns: 2
- Stats at Pro Football Reference

Head coaching record
- Regular season: College: 136–81–4 (.624)
- Postseason: NCAA D-III: 1–1–0 (.500)

Julius Harper Davis Jr. (December 11, 1925 – December 26, 2020) was an American football player and coach. He played professionally as a defensive back in the All-America Football Conference (AAFC) and the National Football League (NFL). Davis served as the head football coach at Millsaps College from 1964 to 1988, compiling a record of 136–81–4.

== College career ==
Davis played college football at Mississippi State University from 1945 until 1948. He was the Bulldogs leading scorer in 1945, 1947, and 1948 and was named MSU Best Athlete three years in a row from 1946 to 1948. Davis was named to the AP All-SEC team and the UPI All-South team in 1945 and the College All-Star Game in 1949.

== Professional career ==
Davis was drafted in the second round of the 1949 NFL draft by the NFL's Pittsburgh Steelers but played that year for the Los Angeles Dons of the All-America Football Conference. Following the 1949 season the AAFC merged with the NFL and all but three of the ten AAFC teams were disbanded while the 49ers, Browns, and Colts joined the NFL. The players from the disbanded teams entered a dispersal draft and Davis was the first round selection of the Chicago Bears. Davis spent one season in Chicago and led the team in interceptions with five. Davis left Chicago and spent the following season as a member of the Green Bay Packers during the 1951 NFL season.

== Coaching career ==
Davis began his coaching career as the head coach at West Point High School in West Point, Mississippi. After one season at West Point he took the head coaching job at Columbus Lee High School in Columbus, Mississippi. after spending a single season as the coach of the Lee Generals, Davis returned to his alma mater, Mississippi State, and served as an assistant from 1956 through 1963. Davis left MSU to take over as the head coach at Millsaps College in Jackson, Mississippi. As the head coach at Millsaps he compiled an overall record of 136–81–4 in 25 seasons including an undefeated 9–0 season for the 1980 Millsaps Majors football team. He also led the Majors to their first Division III playoff appearance in 1975. Davis retired from Millsaps following the 1988 season. After his retirement from Millsaps, he served as an assistant coach at Jackson Academy in Jackson, Mississippi from 1990 to 2006.

== Honors and awards ==
- AP All-SEC 1945
- UPI All-South 1945
- Mississippi State University Best Athlete 1946–48
- Mississippi State University Sports Hall of Fame 1974
- Mississippi Sportsman of the Year in 1976
- Mississippi Sports Hall of Fame 1980
- Millsaps Sports Hall of Fame 1989
- Harper Davis Field, home of the Millsaps Majors football, soccer, and lacrosse teams was named in his honor in 2004
- He has been honored nationally for his contributions to the sport of football and his work with the Cystic Fibrosis Foundation.

== Head coaching record ==
Year	Team	Overall	Conference	Standing	Bowl/playoffs
Millsaps Majors (NCAA College Division independent) (1964–1972)
1964	Millsaps	0–8			
1965	Millsaps	2–6			
1966	Millsaps	4–3–1			
1967	Millsaps	1–6–1			
1968	Millsaps	6–3			
1969	Millsaps	6–2–1			
1970	Millsaps	6–3			
1971	Millsaps	4–5			
1972	Millsaps	4–4			
Millsaps Majors (NCAA Division III independent) (1973–1988)
1973	Millsaps	5–4			
1974	Millsaps	5–3			
1975	Millsaps	9–2			L NCAA Division III Semifinal
1976	Millsaps	7–2			
1977	Millsaps	2–6			
1978	Millsaps	5–4			
1979	Millsaps	7–3			
1980	Millsaps	9–0			
1981	Millsaps	7–2			
1982	Millsaps	6–3			
1983	Millsaps	7–2			
1984	Millsaps	8–1			
1985	Millsaps	7–1–1			
1986	Millsaps	7–2			
1987	Millsaps	7–3			
1988	Millsaps	5–3			
Millsaps:		136–81–4			
Total:		136–81–4			
