= 1975 NCAA Division III football season =

American college football season

- Regular season: August – November 1975
- Playoffs: November – December 1975
- National championship: Garrett-Harrison Stadium; Phenix City, AL
- Champion: Wittenberg

The 1975 NCAA Division III football season, part of college football in the United States organized by the National Collegiate Athletic Association at the Division III level, began in August 1975, and concluded with the NCAA Division III Football Championship in December 1975 at Garrett-Harrison Stadium in Phenix City, Alabama. The Wittenberg Tigers won their second Division III championship, defeating the Ithaca Bombers by a final score of 28−0.

== Conference standings ==
1975 College Athletic Conference football standings
	Conf.					Overall
Team	W		L		T	W		L		T
Rose–Hulman +	4	–	0	–	0	7	–	3	–	0
Sewanee +	4	–	0	–	0	6	–	3	–	0
Centre	2	–	2	–	0	4	–	4	–	1
Southwestern (TN)	2	–	2	–	0	4	–	4	–	0
Principia	0	–	4	–	0	1	–	9	–	0
+ – Conference co-champions

1975 College Conference of Illinois and Wisconsin football standings
	Conf.					Overall
Team	W		L		T	W		L		T
Augustana (IL) $	6	–	2	–	0	7	–	2	–	0
North Central (IL)	5	–	2	–	1	5	–	3	–	1
Carroll (WI)	5	–	3	–	0	6	–	3	–	0
Millikin	5	–	3	–	0	6	–	3	–	0
Wheaton (IL)	5	–	3	–	0	5	–	4	–	0
Illinois Wesleyan	4	–	3	–	1	4	–	4	–	1
Carthage	3	–	5	–	0	4	–	5	–	0
Elmhurst	1	–	7	–	0	2	–	7	–	0
North Park	1	–	7	–	0	1	–	8	–	0
$ – Conference champion

1975 Independent College Athletic Conference football standings
	Conf.					Overall
Team	W		L		T	W		L		T
Ithaca $^	4	–	0	–	0	10	–	1	–	0
Alfred	3	–	1	–	0	7	–	2	–	0
St. Lawrence	3	–	2	–	0	7	–	2	–	0
Hobart	2	–	3	–	0	5	–	4	–	0
RIT	1	–	4	–	0	2	–	7	–	0
RPI	0	–	3	–	0	3	–	5	–	0
$ – Conference champion; ^ – NCAA Division III playoff participant

1975 Indiana Collegiate Conference football standings
	Conf.					Overall
Team	W		L		T	W		L		T
Butler $	6	–	0	–	0	9	–	1	–	0
Indiana Central ^	5	–	1	–	0	8	–	3	–	0
Evansville	4	–	2	–	0	7	–	3	–	0
DePauw	2	–	4	–	0	5	–	5	–	0
Valparaiso	2	–	4	–	0	3	–	6	–	0
Saint Joseph's (IN)	2	–	4	–	0	2	–	8	–	0
Wabash	0	–	6	–	0	3	–	7	–	0
$ – Conference champion; ^ – NCAA Division III playoff participant

1975 Iowa Conference football standings
	Conf.					Overall
Team	W		L		T	W		L		T
No. 3 William Penn $^	7	–	0	–	0	10	–	1	–	0
No. 9 Buena Vista	6	–	1	–	0	8	–	2	–	0
Central (IA)	4	–	3	–	0	5	–	4	–	0
Luther	4	–	3	–	0	4	–	5	–	0
Dubuque	3	–	4	–	0	4	–	5	–	1
Wartburg	2	–	5	–	0	4	–	5	–	0
Simpson (IA)	1	–	6	–	0	2	–	7	–	0
Upper Iowa	1	–	6	–	0	1	–	9	–	0
$ – Conference champion; ^ – NAIA Division II playoff participant; Rankings from NAIA Division II poll

1975 Metropolitan Intercollegiate Conference football standings
	Conf.					Overall
Team	W		L		T	W		L		T
C. W. Post $	4	–	0	–	0	9	–	1	–	0
Merchant Marine	4	–	1	–	0	7	–	2	–	0
Wagner	3	–	2	–	0	6	–	2	–	1
Fordham	1	–	2	–	1	3	–	5	–	1
Hofstra	1	–	4	–	0	3	–	6	–	0
Seton Hall	0	–	4	–	1	2	–	7	–	1
$ – Conference champion

1975 Michigan Intercollegiate Athletic Association football standings
	Conf.					Overall
Team	W		L		T	W		L		T
Hope $	4	–	0	–	1	8	–	0	–	1
Alma	3	–	2	–	0	6	–	3	–	0
Albion	2	–	2	–	1	6	–	2	–	1
Adrian	2	–	3	–	0	4	–	5	–	0
Olivet	2	–	3	–	0	4	–	5	–	0
Kalamazoo	1	–	4	–	0	4	–	4	–	0
$ – Conference champion

1975 Middle Atlantic Conference football standings
	Conf.					Overall
Team	W		L		T	W		L		T
Northern Division
Albright x^	6	–	0	–	0	8	–	2	–	0
Juniata	4	–	2	–	0	6	–	3	–	0
Lycoming	3	–	2	–	0	6	–	2	–	0
Upsala	3	–	3	–	0	5	–	4	–	0
Wilkes	2	–	3	–	0	3	–	5	–	0
Susquehanna	2	–	4	–	0	3	–	6	–	0
Delaware Valley	0	–	6	–	0	0	–	8	–	0
Southern Division
Widener x^	8	–	0	–	0	10	–	1	–	0
Franklin & Marshall	6	–	2	–	0	7	–	2	–	0
Lebanon Valley	6	–	2	–	0	6	–	3	–	0
Moravian	5	–	2	–	1	6	–	2	–	1
Johns Hopkins	3	–	3	–	1	3	–	5	–	1
Dickinson	3	–	5	–	1	3	–	5	–	1
Muhlenberg	2	–	5	–	2	2	–	6	–	2
Ursinus	1	–	6	–	1	1	–	6	–	1
Western Maryland	1	–	5	–	0	2	–	7	–	0
Swarthmore	1	–	6	–	0	1	–	7	–	0
Gettysburg	0	–	0	–	0	3	–	6	–	0
x – Division champion/co-champions; ^ – NCAA Division III playoff participant

1975 Midwest Conference football standings
	Conf.					Overall
Team	W		L		T	W		L		T
Lawrence $	7	–	1	–	0	8	–	1	–	0
Cornell (IA)	6	–	2	–	0	7	–	2	–	0
Ripon	6	–	2	–	0	6	–	3	–	0
Coe	4	–	4	–	0	4	–	5	–	0
Knox	4	–	4	–	0	4	–	5	–	0
Grinnell	3	–	5	–	0	4	–	5	–	0
Beloit	2	–	5	–	0	3	–	6	–	0
Carleton	2	–	6	–	0	2	–	7	–	0
Lake Forest	1	–	6	–	0	2	–	6	–	0
Monmouth (IL)			–			4	–	4	–	0
$ – Conference champion; Games against Monmouth (IL) were not counted in the conference standings.

1975 Minnesota Intercollegiate Athletic Conference football standings
	Conf.					Overall
Team	W		L		T	W		L		T
No. 13 Saint John's (MN) $	6	–	0	–	1	8	–	1	–	1
Minnesota–Duluth	6	–	1	–	0	8	–	2	–	0
Hamline	4	–	3	–	0	5	–	5	–	0
Gustavus Adolphus	4	–	3	–	0	4	–	5	–	0
St. Olaf	3	–	3	–	1	5	–	3	–	1
Concordia–Moorhead	3	–	4	–	0	5	–	4	–	0
St. Thomas (MN)	3	–	4	–	0	3	–	6	–	0
Augsburg	1	–	6	–	0	2	–	8	–	0
Macalester	0	–	7	–	0	0	–	10	–	0
$ – Conference champion; Rankings from NAIA Division I poll

1975 New England Football Conference standings
	Conf.					Overall
Team	W		L		T	W		L		T
Nichols +	6	–	2	–	0	6	–	2	–	0
Boston State +	6	–	2	–	0	7	–	3	–	0
Framingham State	5	–	2	–	0	6	–	2	–	0
Bridgewater State	5	–	3	–	0	7	–	3	–	0
Plymouth State	5	–	3	–	0	6	–	4	–	0
Maine Maritime	4	–	3	–	0	4	–	4	–	0
Massachusetts Maritime	2	–	6	–	0	2	–	6	–	0
New Haven	2	–	6	–	0	2	–	7	–	0
Curry	0	–	8	–	0	0	–	8	–	0
+ – Conference co-champions

1975 New Jersey State Athletic Conference football standings
	Conf.					Overall
Team	W		L		T	W		L		T
Glassboro State $	5	–	0	–	0	7	–	2	–	1
Montclair State	4	–	1	–	0	4	–	4	–	2
Trenton State	3	–	2	–	0	5	–	4	–	0
Kean	2	–	3	–	0	3	–	7	–	0
Jersey City State	1	–	4	–	0	2	–	6	–	0
William Paterson	0	–	5	–	0	1	–	8	–	0
$ – Conference champion

1975 Ohio Athletic Conference football standings
	Conf.					Overall
Team	W		L		T	W		L		T
Blue Division
Wittenberg xy$^	4	–	0	–	0	12	–	1	–	0
Denison	3	–	1	–	0	5	–	4	–	0
Mount Union	2	–	2	–	0	7	–	2	–	0
Ohio Wesleyan	1	–	3	–	0	4	–	5	–	0
Capital	0	–	4	–	0	1	–	8	–	0
Red Division
Muskingum xy	4	–	1	–	0	6	–	4	–	0
Baldwin–Wallace	4	–	1	–	0	7	–	2	–	0
Marietta	3	–	2	–	0	4	–	5	–	0
Heidelberg	3	–	2	–	0	3	–	6	–	0
Otterbein	1	–	4	–	0	4	–	5	–	0
Wooster	0	–	5	–	0	1	–	8	–	0
Not competing for championship
Ohio Northern			–			4	–	4	–	1
Kenyon			–			3	–	6	–	0
Oberlin			–			2	–	4	–	0
Championship: Muskingum 9, Wittenberg 0
$ – Conference champion; x – Division champion/co-champions; y – Championship game participant; ^ – NCAA Division III playoff participant

1975 Pennsylvania State Athletic Conference football standings
	Conf.					Overall
Team	W		L		T	W		L		T
East Division
East Stroudsburg xy$	6	–	0	–	0	10	–	0	–	0
Millersville	4	–	2	–	0	6	–	3	–	0
West Chester	3	–	2	–	0	4	–	5	–	0
Kutztown	3	–	3	–	0	3	–	5	–	1
Mansfield	2	–	3	–	0	5	–	4	–	0
Cheyney	2	–	4	–	0	4	–	6	–	0
Bloomsburg	0	–	6	–	0	1	–	8	–	0
West Division
Edinboro xy	6	–	0	–	0	8	–	3	–	0
IUP	4	–	1	–	1	8	–	1	–	1
Clarion	3	–	2	–	1	6	–	2	–	1
Shippensburg	3	–	3	–	0	6	–	5	–	0
Slippery Rock	3	–	3	–	0	4	–	5	–	0
Lock Haven	1	–	5	–	0	1	–	8	–	0
California (PA)	0	–	6	–	0	0	–	8	–	0
Championship: East Stroudsburg 24, Edinboro 20
$ – Conference champion; x – Division champion/co-champions; y – Championship game participant

1975 Presidents' Athletic Conference football standings
	Conf.					Overall
Team	W		L		T	W		L		T
Bethany (WV) $	5	–	1	–	0	5	–	4	–	0
Washington & Jefferson	4	–	2	–	0	6	–	3	–	0
Carnegie Mellon	3	–	3	–	0	5	–	3	–	0
Thiel	3	–	3	–	0	5	–	4	–	0
Hiram	3	–	3	–	0	4	–	5	–	0
John Carroll	3	–	3	–	0	4	–	5	–	0
Case Western Reserve	0	–	6	–	0	0	–	8	–	0
Allegheny *	0	–	0	–	0	6	–	2	–	0
$ – Conference champion; * – Ineligible for conference title

1975 Southern California Intercollegiate Athletic Conference football standings
	Conf.					Overall
Team	W		L		T	W		L		T
Redlands +	4	–	0	–	1	7	–	2	–	1
La Verne +	4	–	0	–	1	6	–	3	–	1
Claremont-Mudd	2	–	3	–	0	4	–	4	–	0
Whittier	2	–	3	–	0	3	–	6	–	1
Occidental	2	–	3	–	0	3	–	5	–	0
Pomona-Pitzer	0	–	5	–	0	0	–	9	–	0
+ – Conference co-champions

1975 Virginia College Athletic Association football standings
	Conf.					Overall
Team	W		L		T	W		L		T
Madison $	5	–	0	–	0	9	–	0	–	1
Virginia Union	2	–	0	–	0	7	–	4	–	0
Hampden–Sydney	4	–	1	–	0	7	–	2	–	0
Virginia State	2	–	1	–	0	2	–	8	–	0
Randolph–Macon	3	–	2	–	0	6	–	4	–	0
Hampton	1	–	2	–	0	5	–	5	–	0
Saint Paul's (VA)	1	–	2	–	0	2	–	8	–	0
Emory & Henry	0	–	3	–	0	2	–	9	–	0
Washington and Lee	0	–	3	–	0	1	–	8	–	1
Bridgewater	0	–	4	–	0	2	–	7	–	0
$ – Conference champion

1975 Wisconsin State University Conference football standings
	Conf.					Overall
Team	W		L		T	W		L		T
No. 14 Wisconsin–River Falls +	7	–	1	–	0	8	–	2	–	0
Wisconsin–La Crosse +	7	–	1	–	0	8	–	3	–	0
Wisconsin–Whitewater +	7	–	1	–	0	8	–	3	–	0
Wisconsin–Stevens Point	4	–	4	–	0	4	–	6	–	0
Wisconsin–Eau Claire	3	–	5	–	0	4	–	6	–	0
Wisconsin–Oshkosh	3	–	5	–	0	3	–	7	–	0
Wisconsin–Stout	3	–	5	–	0	3	–	7	–	0
Wisconsin–Platteville	2	–	6	–	0	3	–	7	–	0
Wisconsin–Superior	0	–	8	–	0	1	–	9	–	0
+ – Conference co-champions; Rankings from NAIA Division I poll

1975 NCAA Division III independents football records
	Conf.			Overall
Team	W	L	T	W		L		T
Bowie State		–		9	–	1	–	0
Millsaps ^		–		9	–	2	–	0
Albany		–		7	–	2	–	0
Colorado College ^		–		7	–	2	–	1
Georgetown		–		5	–	3	–	0
Saint Peter's		–		5	–	3	–	0
St. Norbert		–		6	–	4	–	0
Plattsburgh		–		4	–	3	–	1
Canisius		–		5	–	4	–	0
Grove City		–		5	–	4	–	0
Rochester (NY)		–		5	–	4	–	0
Trinity (TX)		–		5	–	4	–	0
Norwich		–		4	–	5	–	0
Ashland		–		4	–	6	–	0
Cortland		–		2	–	6	–	1
Saint Mary's		–		3	–	8	–	0
San Diego		–		2	–	7	–	0
Brockport		–		1	–	6	–	1
Fairleigh Dickinson–Florham		–		1	–	6	–	0
Chicago		–		1	–	7	–	0
Maryville (TN)		–		0	–	9	–	0
^ – NCAA Division III playoff participant

== Conference champions ==
Conference champions
- College Athletic Conference – Rose–Hulman and Sewanee
- College Conference of Illinois and Wisconsin – Augustana (IL)
- Independent College Athletic Conference – Ithaca
- Iowa Intercollegiate Athletic Conference – Wiliam Penn
- Michigan Intercollegiate Athletic Association – Hope
- Middle Atlantic Conference – Albright (North), Widener (South)
- Midwest Collegiate Athletic Conference – Lawrence
- Minnesota Intercollegiate Athletic Conference – Saint John's (MN)
- New England Football Conference – Boston State and Nichols
- New Jersey State Athletic Conference – Glassboro State
- Northwest Conference – Linfield, Pacific Lutheran, and Whitworth
- Southern Intercollegiate Athletic Conference (Division III) – Fisk
- Southern California Intercollegiate Athletic Conference – La Verne and Redlands
- Wisconsin Intercollegiate Athletic Conference – Wisconsin–La Crosse, Wisconsin–River Falls, and Wisconsin–Whitewater

== Postseason ==
The 1975 NCAA Division III Football Championship playoffs were the third annual single-elimination tournament to determine the national champion of men's NCAA Division III college football. The championship game was held at Garrett-Harrison Stadium in Phenix City, Alabama for the third consecutive year. The bracket expanded from four to eight teams.

=== Playoff bracket ===
Quarterfinals; Campus Sites
Widener	14
Albright	6
Ithaca	41
Fort Valley State	12
Wittenberg	14
Indiana Central	13
Millsaps	28
Colorado College	21

Semifinals; Campus Sites
Widener	14
Ithaca	23
Wittenberg	55
Millsaps	22

National Championship Game; Garrett-Harrison Stadium; Phenix City, AL
Ithaca	0
Wittenberg	28

== Coaching changes ==
This list includes all head coaching changes announced during or after the season.

School	Outgoing coach	Reason	Replacement	Previous position
Augsburg	Bill Caris	Resigned	Al Kloppen	Augustana (IL) defensive coordinator (1975)
Beloit	Charles Ross	Resigned	Bob Nicholls	Beloit athletic director (1965–1976)
Bloomsburg	Bill Sproule	Resigned	Ron Puhl	Bloomsburg track and field coach (1967–1975)
Bowie State	Clarence Thomas	Resigned	John Organ	Howard assistant coach (1968–1975)
Brockport	Dave Hutter	Resigned	Bud Sims	Brockport defensive coordinator (1975)
Carnegie Mellon	Joe Gasparella	Fired	Chuck Klausing	West Virginia assistant head coach and defensive coordinator (1973–1975)
Case Western Reserve	Flory Mauriocourt	Fired	Bob Del Rosa	Case Western Reserve defensive line coach (1970–1975)
Chicago	Walter Hass	Retired	Bob Lombardi	Homewood-Flossmoor HS (IL) head coach (1967–1975)
Coast Guard	Otto Graham	Resigned	Bill Hickey	Army defensive line coach (1975)
Delaware Valley	Tom Shreiner	Resigned	Al Wilson	Princeton defensive ends coach and linebackers coach (1973–1975)
Elmhurst	Al Hanke (interim)	Permanent replacement hired	Tom Beck	Northern Illinois offensive coordinator (1975)
Heidelberg	Armin Riesen	Hired as backfield coach for Bowling Green	Bob Rankin	Michigan State offensive line coach (1974–1975)
Jersey City State	Bill McKeown	Resigned	Harry Massey	Lincoln HS (NJ) head coach (1968–1975)
Lock Haven	Bob Weller	Fired	Bill Connor	Ripon head coach (1973–1975)
Macalester	Don Hudson	Hired as head coach for Lincoln (MO)	Clint Ewald	Blaine HS (MN) head coach
Merchant Marine	George Paterno	Fired	Clive Rush	Boston Patriots head coach (1969–1970)
Montclair State	Clary Anderson	Retired	Fred Hill	Pequannock Township HS (NJ) head coach (1970–1975)
New Haven	Joe McHugh	Resigned	Thomas H. Bell	Plymouth State head coach (1972–1975)
New York Tech	Jack Boyle	Fired	Pete Pizzarelli	Stony Brook offensive coordinator (1975)
Occidental	Hal Lefler	Resigned	Bill McQueary	UC Riverside offensive coordinator and offensive line coach (1974–1975)
Olivet	Doug Kay	Hired as offensive coordinator for San Jose State	Bob Friedlund	Sarnia Imperials head coach (1955)
Plymouth State	Thomas H. Bell	Hired as head coach for New Haven	Charlie Currier	Plymouth State offensive coordinator (1972–1975)
Ripon	Bill Connor	Hired as head coach for Lock Haven	Bob Giesey	Ripon defensive coordinator (1975)
San Diego	Dick Logan	Resigned	Bill Williams	San Diego defensive coordinator (1974–1975)
Shippensburg	Gene Epley	Hired as offensive line coach for Virginia	Joe Mark	Duke defensive ends coach (spring 1976)
Southwestern (TN)	Don Lear	Fired	Dick Thornton	The Hawaiians front office (1975)
Upper Iowa	George Richards	Resigned	Everett Eischeid (interim)	Upper Iowa head coach (1960–1968)
Ursinus	Richard J. Whatley	Resigned	Larry Karas	Ursinus linebackers coach (1975)
William Penn	Ron Randleman	Hired as head coach for Pittsburg State	Craig Boller	William Penn defensive coordinator (1974–1975)

== See also ==
- 1975 NCAA Division I football season
- 1975 NCAA Division II football season
- 1975 NAIA Division I football season
- 1975 NAIA Division II football season
