= Don Lear =

American football coach (1935–2018)

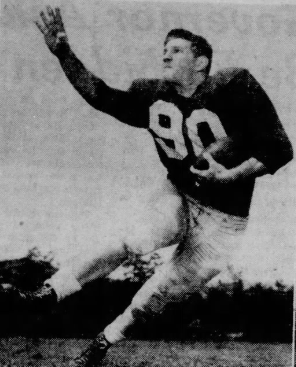
- Lear in 1955

Biographical details
- Born: March 1, 1935; Philadelphia, Pennsylvania, U.S.
- Died: December 14, 2018 (aged 83); Cordova, Tennessee, U.S.
- Education: University of North Carolina at Chapel Hill (1957); Eastern Kentucky University

Playing career

Football
- 1953–1956: North Carolina
- Position: Fullback

Coaching career (HC unless noted)

Football
- 1957: North Carolina (assistant)
- 1958: Eastern Kentucky (assistant)
- 1959: Eastern Kentucky (ends)
- 1960 (spring): Eastern Kentucky (assistant backfield)
- 1960: Columbia Military Academy (TN) (assistant)
- 1961–1963: Middle Tennessee (OB/DB)
- 1964: Middle Tennessee (C/ends/LB)
- 1965–1968: Middle Tennessee (OB)
- 1969 (spring): Southwestern (TN) (line)
- 1969–1975: Southwestern (TN)
- 1976–1987: Memphis Catholic HS (TN)
- 1988–1997: Saint Benedict HS (TN)

Wrestling
- 1960–1961: Columbia Military Academy (TN)
- 1969–?: Southwestern (TN)
- 1976–?: Memphis Catholic HS (TN) (assistant)

Track and field
- 1958–1960: Eastern Kentucky (assistant)
- 1969–?: Southwestern (TN)

Administrative career (AD unless noted)
- ?–1988: Memphis Catholic HS (TN)

Head coaching record
- Overall: 30–23–5 (college football); 132–95 (high school football)

Accomplishments and honors

Championships
- 3 CAC (1970–1971, 1973)

Don Lear Sr. (March 1, 1935 – December 14, 2018) was an American college football coach. He was the head football coach for Southwestern at Memphis—now known as Rhodes College—from 1969 to 1975, Memphis Catholic High School from 1976 to 1987, and Saint Benedict at Auburndale High School from 1988 to 1997.

== Playing career ==
Lear was born on March 1, 1935 in Philadelphia. He played high school football for Hatboro High School as a fullback. He also participated in basketball, baseball, and track and field; earning 14 total letters in all four sports combined.

In 1953, Lear enrolled at the University of North Carolina at Chapel Hill, beginning his college football career as a fullback for the school's freshmen team. In his sophomore season, he did not start but regularly played in a reserve capacity, even scoring two touchdowns against Wake Forest. He briefly moved to guard during spring practices in 1956, but ultimately remained as a fullback.

== Coaching career ==
Lear began his coaching career as North Carolina upon graduating as an assistant. After one season, he was named as a part-time assistant for Eastern Kentucky while he pursued his master's degree. He also assisted with the school's track and field team. In 1959, he was named as a full-time assistant as the football team's ends coach. He spent the spring of 1960 as an assistant backfield coach for Eastern Kentucky.

Lear spent the 1960 season as an assistant for Columbia Military Academy before becoming the defensive backs coach for Middle Tennessee. He spent the 1964 season as the team's centers, ends, and linebackers coach then transitioned to offensive backs coach in 1965.

In 1969, Lear joined Southwestern at Memphis—now known as Rhodes College—as the school's head wrestling and track and field coach while also assisting with the football team. In June 1969, a month after joining the football team, Lear was promoted to head football coach after Jesse Johnson resigned to enter private business. Lear was the head football coach for seven seasons and amassed an overall record of 30–23–3 and won conference championships in 1970, 1971, and 1973. He resigned after the 1975 season.

In 1976, Lear was hired as the head football coach for Memphis Catholic High School. In 1988, he moved to Saint Benedict at Auburndale High School. He retired from coaching after the 1997 season having amassed an overall high school coaching record of 132–95.

== Personal life ==
Lear died on December 14, 2018 in Cordova, Tennessee.

== Head coaching record ==
=== College football ===
Year	Team	Overall	Conference	Standing	Bowl/playoffs
Southwestern Lynx (College Athletic Conference) (1969–1975)
1969	Southwestern	3–6	2–2	T–2nd	
1970	Southwestern	7–1	3–1	T–1st	
1971	Southwestern	5–2	3–1	T–1st	
1972	Southwestern	4–4	1–3	T–3rd	
1973	Southwestern	4–3–2	2–0	1st	
1974	Southwestern	3–3–3	2–1–1	2nd	
1975	Southwestern	4–4	2–2	T–3rd	
Southwestern:		30–23–5	15–10–1		
Total:		30–23–5			
National championship Conference title Conference division title or championship game berth

=== High school football ===
Year	Team	Overall	Conference	Standing	Bowl/playoffs
Memphis Catholic Chargers () (1976–1987)
1976	Memphis Catholic	4–6	4–6	23rd	
1977	Memphis Catholic	7–3	3–3	T–3rd	
1978	Memphis Catholic	6–4	2–4	T–6th	
1979	Memphis Catholic	5–4	1–4	6th	
1980	Memphis Catholic	2–5	1–4	6th	
1981	Memphis Catholic	9–2	8–1	2nd	
1982	Memphis Catholic	13–0	8–0	1st	
1983	Memphis Catholic	7–4	2–3	T–3rd	
1984	Memphis Catholic	5–4	2–3	T–3rd	
1985	Memphis Catholic	4–6	2–3	T–3rd	
1986	Memphis Catholic	5–5	4–1	2nd	
1987	Memphis Catholic	5–5	2–4	T–4th	
Memphis Catholic:		73–48	39–36		
Saint Benedict Eagles () (1988–1997)
1988	Saint Benedict	1–8	0–5	6th	
1989	Saint Benedict	0–9	0–5	6th	
1990	Saint Benedict	1–8	1–4	5th	
1991	Saint Benedict	6–3	4–1	T–1st	
1992	Saint Benedict	8–3	3–1	2nd	
1993	Saint Benedict	11–1	6–0	1st	
1994	Saint Benedict	6–5	4–2	3rd	
1995	Saint Benedict	9–2	5–1	2nd	
1996	Saint Benedict	12–2	5–1	T–1st	
1997	Saint Benedict	5–6	3–1	2nd	
Saint Benedict:		59–47	31–21		
Total:		132–95			
National championship Conference title Conference division title or championship game berth
