= Flory Mauriocourt =

American football player and coach (1933–2011)

Biographical details
- Born: April 7, 1933
- Died: July 26, 2011 (aged 78)
- Education: Baldwin–Wallace

Playing career

Football
- 1952–1955: Western Reserve

Baseball
- c. 1955: Western Reserve
- Positions: Quarterback (football); Third baseman (baseball)

Coaching career (HC unless noted)

Football
- ?–1961: East HS (OH) (assistant)
- 1962–1963: East HS (OH)
- 1964–1968: Western Reserve (assistant)
- 1969–1975: Western Reserve / Case Western Reserve

Baseball
- 1965–1977: Western Reserve / Case Western Reserve

Head coaching record
- Overall: 12–47–1 (college football)

Flory E. Mauriocourt (April 7, 1933 – July 26, 2011) was an American football coach, who coached the very first Case Western Reserve Spartans football team after the federation of Western Reserve University and Case Institute of Technology into Case Western Reserve University.

== Head coaching record ==
=== College football ===
Year	Team	Overall	Conference	Standing	Bowl/playoffs
Western Reserve Red Cats (Presidents' Athletic Conference) (1969–1970)
1969	Western Reserve	1–7	1–5	T–5th	
Western Reserve:		1–7	1–5		
Case Western Reserve Spartans (Presidents' Athletic Conference) (1970–1975)
1970	Case Western Reserve	2–5–1	1–3–1	5th	
1971	Case Western Reserve	3–6	1–4	6th	
1972	Case Western Reserve	4–5	3–4	T–5th	
1973	Case Western Reserve	0–9	0–7	8th	
1974	Case Western Reserve	2–7	2–5	T–6th	
1975	Case Western Reserve	0–8	0–6	7th	
Case Western Reserve:		11–40–1	7–29–1		
Total:		12–47–1			
