= List of Cal Poly Pomona Broncos head football coaches =

The Cal Poly Pomona Broncos team represented California State Polytechnic University, Pomona in college football from 1947 to 1982. The Broncos competed in the NCAA College Division and its successor, Division II.

The program had 11 different head coaches in its 36 seasons of existence, including one who had multiple tenures as coach, and finished with an all time record of 143 wins, 190 losses, and 9 ties.

== Key ==
Key to symbols in coaches list
General		Overall		Conference		Postseason (Note: Although the first Rose Bowl Game was played in 1902, it has been continuously played since the 1916 game, and is recognized as the oldest bowl game by the NCAA. "—" indicates any season prior to 1916 when postseason games were not played.)	
No.	Order of coaches (Note: A running total of the number of head coaches, with coaches who served separate tenures being counted only once. Interim head coaches are represented with "Int" and are not counted in the running total. "—" indicates the team played but either without a coach or no coach is on record. "X" indicates an interim year without play.)	GC	Games coached	CW	Conference wins	PW	Postseason wins
DC	Division championships	OW	Overall wins	CL	Conference losses	PL	Postseason losses
CC	Conference championships	OL	Overall losses	CT	Conference ties	PT	Postseason ties
NC	National championships	OT	Overall ties (Note: Overtime rules in college football were introduced in 1996, making ties impossible in the period since.)	C%	Conference winning percentage		
†	Elected to the College Football Hall of Fame	O%	Overall winning percentage (Note: When computing the win–loss percentage, a tie counts as half a win and half a loss.)				

== Coaches ==
List of head football coaches showing season(s) coached, overall records, conference records, postseason records, and championships.
No.	Name	Season(s)	GC	OW	OL	OT	O%	CW	CL	CT	C%	PW	PL	PT	CCs	NCs
1	Bob Ashton	1947	9	4	4	1	0.500	—	—	—	—	—	—	—	—	0
2	Duane Whitehead	1948–1950; 1952	36	13	22	1	0.375	—	—	—	—	—	—	—	—	0
3	Don Rees	1951	36	13	22	1	0.375	—	—	—	—	—	—	—	—	0
4	Staley Pitts	1953–1955	24	8	16	0	0.333	—	—	—	—	—	—	—	—	0
5	Bob Stull	1956	8	6	2	0	0.750	—	—	—	—	—	—	—	—	0
6	Don Warhurst	1957–1966	91	56	33	2	0.626	—	—	—	—	—	—	—	—	0
7	Ray Daugherty	1967–1968	20	2	18	0	0.100	—	—	—	—	—	—	—	—	0
8	Roy Anderson	1969–1973	52	21	30	1	0.413	4	16	0	0.200	—	—	—	0	0
9	Andy Vinci	1974–1976	31	15	12	4	0.548	4	4	2	0.500	—	—	—	0	0
10	Jim Jones	1977–1979	0	8	23	0	0.258	1	5	0	0.167	—	—	—	0	0
11	Roman Gabriel	1980–1982	32	8	24	0	0.250	2	6	0	0.250	—	—	—	0	0
