= Al Kloppen =

College athletics coach (born c. 1941)

Biographical details
- Born: c. 1941 or 1942 (age 83–84); Lake Mills, Iowa, U.S.
- Education: Augustana College (1964); University of South Dakota (1970)

Playing career

Football
- 1960–1963: Augustana (SD)

Baseball
- 1960–1963: Augustana (SD)
- Position: Quarterback (football)

Coaching career (HC unless noted)

Football
- 1964–1965: Burt HS (IA)
- 1966–1969: South Hamilton HS (IA)
- 1970: Coe (freshman)
- 1971–?: North Park (assistant)
- ?–1975: Augustana (IL) (DC)
- 1976–1985: Augsburg

Baseball
- 1971: Coe

Men's basketball
- 1970–1971: Coe (freshman)
- 1971–?: North Park (assistant)

Track and field
- 1966–1969: South Hamilton HS (IA)

Head coaching record
- Overall: 29–67–3 (college football)

Alvin L. Kloppen (born c. 1941 or 1942) is an American former college athletics coach. He was the head football coach for Burt High School from 1964 to 1965 and South Hamilton High School from 1966 to 1969. He was also the head football coach for Augsburg College—now known as Augsburg University—from 1976 to 1985. He also had a one-year stint as the head baseball coach for Coe College and a four-year stint as the track and field coach for South Hamilton High School.

== Playing career ==
Kloppen grew up in Lake Mills, Iowa, and played high school football for Lake Mills High School as a quarterback. In his career he ran for 2,418 yards and passed for 1,813 yards. He also served as the team's punter, punt returner, and kick returner. He played college football and baseball for Augustana College—now known as Augustana University. He played for the Augustana Vikings football team as a quarterback under head coach Bob Burns. He earned three letters in baseball and two in football.

== Coaching career ==
Kloppen began his football coach career with Burt High School and South Hamilton High School between 1964 and 1969. In 1970, he joined Coe as the freshman coach under head coach Glenn Drahn. He stayed in that post for one year before joining North Park as an assistant coach under head coach William D. Gourley. He had a stint as the defensive coordinator for Augustana (IL) under head coach Ben Newcomb. In 1976, Kloppen was named as the head football coach for Augsburg. In ten years with the team he finished with an overall record of 29–67–3. His best year as head coach came in 1980 when they finished 5–5 overall. He resigned following the 1985 season.

Kloppen was the head baseball coach for Coe in 1970. He won seven games.

In 1970, Kloppen was the freshman coach for Coe's men's basketball team. In 1971, he served a stint as an assistant coach for North Park.

From 1966 to 1969, Kloppen was the track and field coach for South Hamilton High School.

== Personal life ==
Throughout Kloppen's career he served as an assistant professor for physical education.

== Head coaching record ==
=== College football ===
Year	Team	Overall	Conference	Standing	Bowl/playoffs
Augsburg Auggies (Minnesota Intercollegiate Athletic Conference) (1976–1985)
1976	Augsburg	1–8	1–6	7th	
1977	Augsburg	3–6	3–4	5th	
1978	Augsburg	3–6–1	2–5–1	7th	
1979	Augsburg	4–6	3–5	T–6th	
1980	Augsburg	5–5	4–4	T–5th	
1981	Augsburg	4–6	3–5	5th	
1982	Augsburg	2–7–1	2–5–1	6th	
1983	Augsburg	4–7	3–6	T–7th	
1984	Augsburg	2–8	2–7	9th	
1985	Augsburg	1–8–1	0–8–1	10th	
Augsburg:		29–67–3	23–55–3		
Total:		29–67–3			
