= Rick E. Carter =

American football and baseball player and coach (1943–1986)

Biographical details
- Born: July 1, 1943; Dayton, Ohio, U.S.
- Died: February 2, 1986 (aged 42); West Boylston, Massachusetts, U.S.

Coaching career (HC unless noted)

Football
- 1965: Earlham (GA)
- 1966–1971: Earlham
- 1972–1976: Hanover
- 1977–1980: Dayton
- 1981–1985: Holy Cross

Baseball
- 1969–1972: Earlham

Head coaching record
- Overall: 137–58–7 (football); 76–53–2 (baseball)
- Tournaments: Football; 0–2 (NAIA D-II playoffs); 3–1 (NCAA D-III playoffs); 0–1 (NCAA D-I-AA playoffs)

Accomplishments and honors

Championships
- Football; 1 NCAA Division III (1980); 5 Hoosier-Buckeye (1973–1976)

Awards
- Football; AFCA College Division Coach of the Year (1980)

Rick E. Carter (July 1, 1943 – February 2, 1986) was an American football and baseball player and coach. He served as the head football coach Earlham College in Richmond, Indiana (1966–1971), Hanover College (1972–1976), the University of Dayton (1977–1980), and the College of the Holy Cross (1981–1985), compiling a career college football coaching record of 137–58–7. His 1980 Dayton Flyers won the NCAA Division III Football Championship after a 14–0 season and a 63–0 victory over Ithaca in the title game. He was named the AFCA College Division Coach of the Year in 1980.

Carter committed suicide after the 1985 season at the age of 42. He had been hospitalized for psychiatric treatment of depression. His father had died of cancer the previous August and his mother was terminally ill but friends claimed he was also upset about his lack of career advancement. In previous years Carter had been offered jobs at several major programs, but Holy Cross would not release him from his contract and those offers had stopped coming.

== Head coaching record ==
=== Football ===
Year	Team	Overall	Conference	Standing	Bowl/playoffs	NCAA^{#}
Earlham Quakers (NAIA independent) (1966)
1966	Earlham	2–5–1				
Earlham Quakers (Hoosier / Hoosier–Buckeye Conference) (1967–1971)
1967	Earlham	4–3–1	2–2–1	T–4th		
1968	Earlham	4–3–1	3–3	4th		
1969	Earlham	5–4	3–3	T–3rd		
1970	Earlham	6–3	3–1	T–1st		
1971	Earlham	6–3	3–3	T–3rd		
Earlham:		27–21–3	14–12–1			
Hanover Panthers (Hoosier-Buckeye Conference) (1972–1976)
1972	Hanover	4–5	2–5	8th		
1973	Hanover	8–1	6–1	1st		
1974	Hanover	9–1	7–0	1st	L NAIA Division II Semifinal	
1975	Hanover	9–1	8–0	1st	L NAIA Division II Semifinal	
1976	Hanover	6–3	6–2	T–1st		
Hanover:		36–11	29–8			
Dayton Flyers (NCAA Division III independent) (1977–1980)
1977	Dayton	8–3				
1978	Dayton	9–2–1			L NCAA Division III Quarterfinal	
1979	Dayton	8–2–1				
1980	Dayton	14–0			W NCAA Division III Championship	
Dayton:		39–7–2				
Holy Cross Crusaders (NCAA Division I-AA independent) (1981–1985)
1981	Holy Cross	6–5				
1982	Holy Cross	8–3				13
1983	Holy Cross	9–2–1			L NCAA Division I-AA Quarterfinal	3
1984	Holy Cross	8–3				15
1985	Holy Cross	4–6–1				
Holy Cross:		35–19–2				
Total:		137–58–7				
National championship Conference title Conference division title or championship game berth
^{#}Rankings from final NCAA Poll.
