= 1973 Southwestern Lynx football team =

American college football season

1973 Southwestern Lynx football

CAC champion
- Conference: College Athletic Conference
- Record: 4–3–2 (2–0 CAC)
- Head coach: Don Lear (5th season)
- Home stadium: Fargason Field

1973 College Athletic Conference football standings
	Conf.					Overall
Team	W		L		T	W		L		T
Southwestern (TN) $	2	–	0	–	0	4	–	3	–	2
Sewanee	1	–	1	–	0	5	–	3	–	0
Centre	0	–	2	–	0	0	–	9	–	0
$ – Conference champion

The 1973 Southwestern Lynx football team represented Southwestern at Memphis—now known as Rhodes College—as a member of the College Athletic Conference (CAC) during the 1973 NCAA Division III football season. In their fifth year under head coach Don Lear, the Lynx compiled an overall record of 4–3–2 record with a mark of 2–0 in conference, winning the CAC title, and outscored opponents 135 to 130. Southwestern played home games at Fargason Field in Memphis, Tennessee.

== Schedule ==
Date	Time	Opponent	Site	Result	Attendance	Source
September 15		Millsaps*	Fargason Field; Memphis, TN	L 14–24	2,000	
September 22	2:00 p.m.	at Austin*	Louis Calder Stadium; Sherman, TX	T 14–14		
September 29	2:00 p.m.	Washington University*	Fargason Field; Memphis, TN	T 24–24		
October 6	1:30 p.m.	at Principia*	Clark Field; Elsah, IL	W 21–14	250–1,000	
October 13	2:00 p.m.	at Rose–Hulman*	Phil Brown Field; Terre Haute, IN	L 6–9		
October 20	2:00 p.m.	Sewanee^{†}	Fargason Field; Memphis, TN (Edmund Orgill Trophy)	W 20–6		
October 27	2:00 p.m.	at Centre	Farris Stadium; Danville, KY	W 7–6	1,300–3,500	
November 3	1:00 p.m.	at Washington and Lee*	Wilson Field; Lexington, VA	W 13–6	3,800	
November 10	1:00 p.m.	Maryville (TN)*	Fargason Field; Memphis, TN	L 16–27		
*Non-conference game; ^{†}Homecoming
