= 1980 UCF Knights football team =

American college football season

1980 UCF Knights football
- Conference: Independent
- Record: 4–4–1 (Note: The official NCAA Statistics list a record of 3–5–1.)
- Head coach: Don Jonas (2nd season)
- Home stadium: Orlando Stadium

1980 NCAA Division III independents football records
	Conf.			Overall
Team	W	L	T	W		L		T
Dayton ^		–		14	–	0	–	0
Millsaps		–		9	–	0	–	0
Wabash		–		8	–	0	–	1
Hofstra		–		8	–	2	–	0
Wagner ^		–		8	–	2	–	0
DePauw		–		7	–	2	–	1
Salisbury State		–		7	–	3	–	1
Catholic University		–		6	–	3	–	0
WPI		–		5	–	3	–	0
Canisius		–		5	–	4	–	0
Brockport		–		5	–	4	–	1
Buffalo		–		6	–	5	–	0
Albany		–		5	–	5	–	0
Georgetown		–		4	–	4	–	0
San Diego		–		5	–	5	–	0
UCF		–		4	–	4	–	1
Saint Mary's		–		5	–	6	–	0
Duquesne		–		4	–	5	–	0
Frostburg State		–		4	–	5	–	0
Grove City		–		4	–	5	–	0
Norwich		–		4	–	6	–	0
Rochester (NY)		–		3	–	5	–	1
St. Norbert		–		3	–	6	–	0
Cortland		–		3	–	7	–	0
Colorado College		–		2	–	7	–	0
Saint Francis (PA)		–		2	–	7	–	0
Union (NY)		–		1	–	7	–	0
Fordham		–		0	–	9	–	0
Merchant Marine		–		0	–	11	–	0
^ – NCAA Division III playoff participant

The 1980 UCF Knights football season represented the University of Central Florida (UCF) as an independent during the 1980 NCAA Division III football season. Led by second-year head coach Don Jonas, the Knights compiled a record of 4–4–1, including the program's only tie, against Miles. UCF played their home games at Orlando Stadium in downtown Orlando, Florida.

UCF's 1980 record is mildly disputed. The Carson–Newman Eagles (NAIA) were forced to forfeit their opening day 30–21 victory over the Knights due to an ineligible player. The official NCAA Statistics (possibly by error) maintain UCF's 1980 full season record as 3–5–1, However, the school and local media claim a record of 4–4–1, interpreting the Eagles forfeit as a Knights win.

== Schedule ==
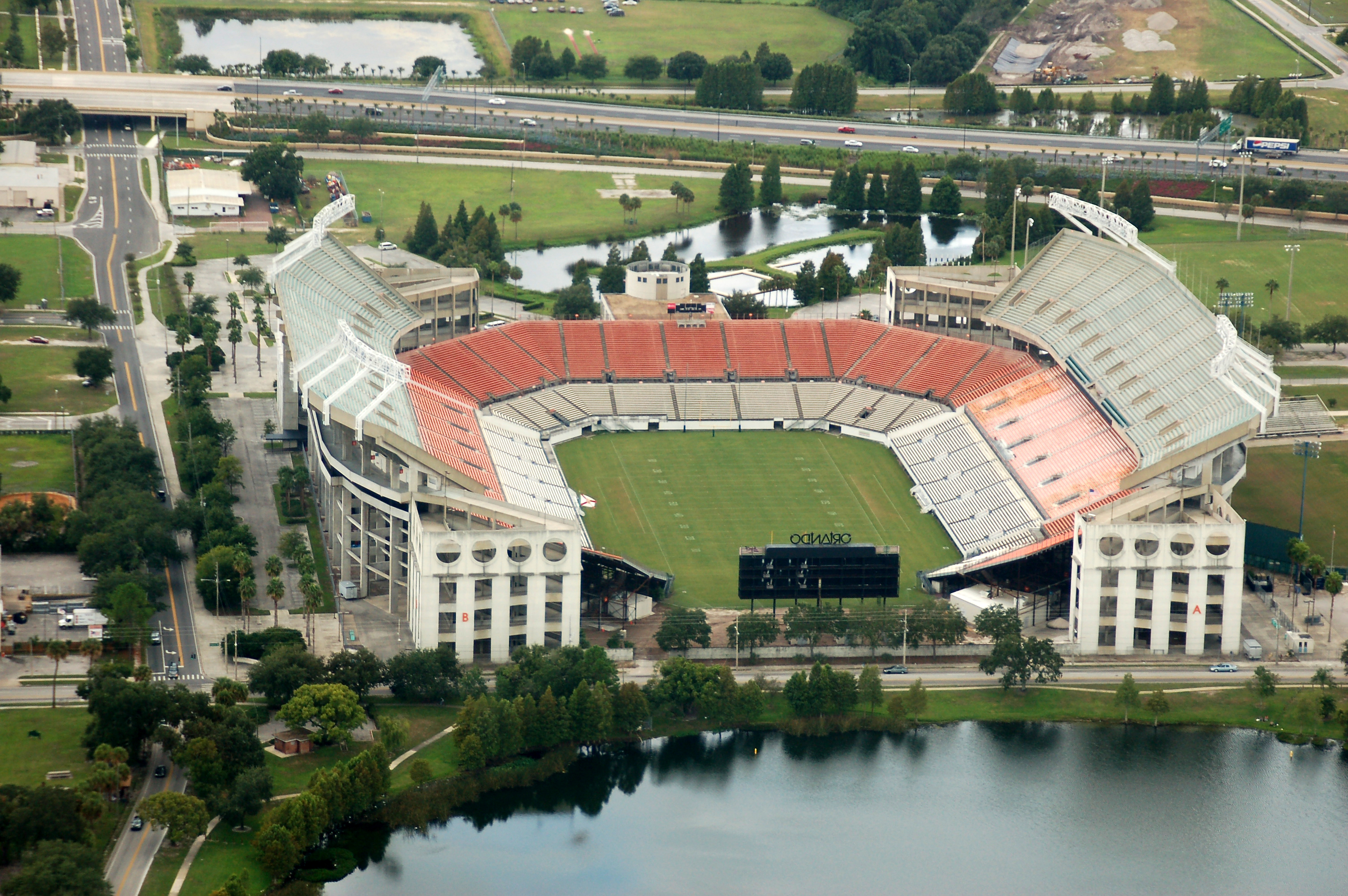
Orlando Stadium, the Knights' home field

Date	Opponent	Site	Result	Attendance	Source
September 13	Carson–Newman	Orlando Stadium; Orlando, FL	W 21−30 (vacated)	13,941	
September 20	Saint Leo	Orlando Stadium; Orlando, FL	W 55–0	8,730	
September 27	Millsaps	Orlando Stadium; Orlando, FL	L 7–8	12,793	
October 4	Miles	Orlando Stadium; Orlando, FL	T 11–11	8,990	
October 11	at Savannah State	Ted Wright Stadium; Savannah, GA	L 0–44	4,100	
October 18	at North Alabama	Braly Municipal Stadium; Florence, AL	L 3–28	3,500	
November 1	Catawba	Orlando Stadium; Orlando, FL	W 14–12	3,500	
November 8	Albany	Orlando Stadium; Orlando, FL	L 27–28	7,757	
November 15	Emory and Henry	Orlando Stadium; Orlando, FL	W 18–14	6,907	
