= Millard Robinson =

American baseball player and football coach (1913–1999)

Biographical details
- Born: c. 1913
- Died: June 10, 1999 (aged 85); Media, Pennsylvania, U.S.

Playing career

Football
- c. 1935: West Chester

Baseball
- 1942: Rome Colonels

Coaching career (HC unless noted)

Football
- c. 1938: Upper Yoder HS (PA) (assistant)
- 1939–1942: Prospect Park HS (PA)
- 1946–1970: Swarthmore HS (PA)
- 1973: Swarthmore

Head coaching record
- Overall: 0–7 (college); 173–80–8 (high school)

Millard P. Robinson Sr. (c. 1913 – June 10, 1999) was a minor league baseball player and high school and college American football coach. He served as the head football coach at Swarthmore High School in Swarthmore, Pennsylvania from 1949 to 1972 and at Swarthmore College in 1973.

Robinson played college football at West Chester State Teachers College—now known as West Chester University—in West Chester, Pennsylvania under head coach Glenn Killinger. He began his coaching and teaching career at Upper Yoder High School, near Johnstown, Pennsylvania. In 1939, Robinson was appointed he football coach at Prospect Park High School in Prospect Park, Pennsylvania. Following service in the United States Navy during World War II, Robinson return to coaching and teaching in 1946 at Swarthmore High School.

Robinson died at the age of 85 of a brain tumor, on June 10, 1999, at his home in Media, Pennsylvania.

== Head coaching record ==
=== College ===
Year	Team	Overall	Conference	Standing	Bowl/playoffs
Swarthmore Garnet Tide (Middle Atlantic Conference) (1998–2000)
1973	Swarthmore	0–7	0–7	10th (Southern)	
Swarthmore:		0–7	0–7		
Total:		0–7			
