= Jim McDonald (American football coach) =

American football coach (1936–2012)

Biographical details
- Born: December 5, 1936
- Died: June 2, 2012 (aged 75); San Francisco, California, U.S.
- Education: San Francisco

Coaching career (HC unless noted)
- 1962–1970: St. Ignatius Coll. Prep (CA)
- 1971–1973: Saint Mary's (OL)
- 1974–1976: Saint Mary's

Head coaching record
- Overall: 9–20 (college)

James Michael McDonald (December 5, 1936 – June 2, 2012) was an American football coach. He served as the head football coach at Saint Mary's College of California from 1974 to 1976, compiling a record of 9–20.

== Head coaching record ==
=== College ===
Year	Team	Overall	Conference	Standing	Bowl/playoffs
Saint Mary's Gaels (NCAA Division III independent) (1974–1976)
1974	Saint Mary's	3–6			
1975	Saint Mary's	3–8			
1976	Saint Mary's	3–6			
Saint Mary's:		9–20			
Total:		9–20			
