= Dave Hutter =

American football coach (born 1941 or 1942)

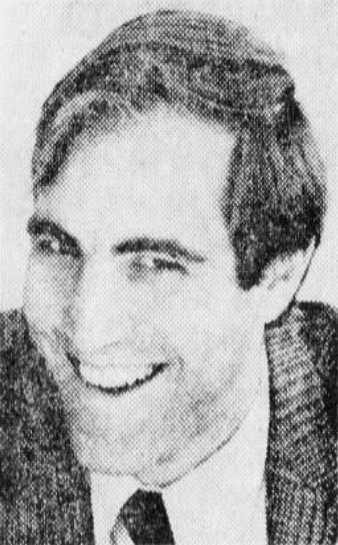
- Dave Hutter in 1973

Biographical details
- Born: c. 1941 or 1942 (age 83–84); Steubenville, Ohio, U.S.
- Education: Ohio University (1965, 1966, 1970)

Playing career

Football
- 1961–1964: Ohio
- Position: Defensive end

Coaching career (HC unless noted)

Football
- 1965: Ohio (GA)
- 1966–1970: Capital (assistant)
- 1971–1973: Brockport (assistant)
- 1974–1975: Brockport

Baseball
- 1967–1971: Capital

Basketball
- 1966–1967: Capital (assistant)

Administrative career (AD unless noted)
- 1973–1975: Brockport
- 1976–1985: Bethany (WV)
- 1985–2003: Case Western Reserve

Head coaching record
- Overall: 3–12–1 (football); 46–33 (baseball)

David Hutter (born c. 1941 or 1942) is an American former college football, baseball, and basketball coach and administrator. He was the head football coach for SUNY Brockport from 1974 to 1975. He also served as the head baseball coach for Capital University from 1967 to 1971. He was the athletic director for Brockport from 1973 to 1975, Bethany College from 1976 to 1985, and Case Western Reserve University from 1985 until his retirement in 2003.

== Early life and playing career ==
Hutter grew up in Steubenville, Ohio, and attended local high school, Steubenville High School, and was a three-sport athlete. He attended Ohio University and was a four-year member of the football team as a defensive end. He served as a team captain for the 1963 Mid-American Conference (MAC) championship team.

== Coaching career ==
Hutter graduated from Ohio in 1965 and returned as a graduate assistant for the football team. After one year, he was hired as an assistant football coach and head baseball coach for Capital University. As baseball coach, he led the team to an overall record of 46–33 in five years. During his stint at Capital, he also served as an assistant basketball coach.

In 1971, Hutter was hired as an assistant football coach for Brockport. After three seasons, he was promoted to head football coach following the resignation of 10-year head coach Gerry D'Agostino. He resigned following the 1975 season in July 1976, following his resignation as athletic director in October 1975. In two years, he led the team to an overall record of 3–12–1.

== Personal life ==
While at Brockport, Hutter served as the athletic director from 1973 until his resignation in October 1975. He resigned, citing "the instability of the athletic program and lack of direction". In July 1976, following his resignation as head football coach, he accepted the athletic director position at Bethany College in Bethany, West Virginia. He retained the position for a decade before being named to the same position at Case Western Reserve University in 1985. He succeeded the retiring Bill Grice. Hutter retired in July 2003.

== Head coaching record ==
=== Football ===
Year	Team	Overall	Conference	Standing	Bowl/playoffs
Brockport Golden Eagles (NCAA Division III independent) (1974–1975)
1974	Brockport	2–6			
1975	Brockport	1–6–1			
Brockport:		3–12–1			
Total:		3–12–1			
