= 1975 Millsaps Majors football team =

American college football season

1975 Millsaps Majors football

NCAA Division III Semifinal, L 22–55 at Wittenberg
- Conference: Independent
- Record: 9–2
- Head coach: Harper Davis (12th season)
- Home stadium: Alumni Field

1975 NCAA Division III independents football records
	Conf.			Overall
Team	W	L	T	W		L		T
Bowie State		–		9	–	1	–	0
Millsaps ^		–		9	–	2	–	0
Albany		–		7	–	2	–	0
Colorado College ^		–		7	–	2	–	1
Georgetown		–		5	–	3	–	0
Saint Peter's		–		5	–	3	–	0
St. Norbert		–		6	–	4	–	0
Plattsburgh		–		4	–	3	–	1
Canisius		–		5	–	4	–	0
Grove City		–		5	–	4	–	0
Rochester (NY)		–		5	–	4	–	0
Trinity (TX)		–		5	–	4	–	0
Norwich		–		4	–	5	–	0
Ashland		–		4	–	6	–	0
Cortland		–		2	–	6	–	1
Saint Mary's		–		3	–	8	–	0
San Diego		–		2	–	7	–	0
Brockport		–		1	–	6	–	1
Fairleigh Dickinson–Florham		–		1	–	6	–	0
Chicago		–		1	–	7	–	0
Maryville (TN)		–		0	–	9	–	0
^ – NCAA Division III playoff participant

The 1975 Millsaps Majors football team was an American football team that represented Millsaps College, as an independent during the 1975 NCAA Division III football season. In their 12th year under head coach Harper Davis, the Majors compiled a 9–2 record, outscored opponents by a total of 289 to 121, and made it to the semifinal in the NCAA Division III playoffs where they lost to the eventual national champion Wittenberg, 55–22. The team played its home games at Alumni Field in Jackson, Mississippi.

The team was led by quarterback Ricky Haygood who finished the season with 2,022 passing yards, seventeen touchdowns, and six interceptions.

== Schedule ==
Date	Opponent	Site	Result	Attendance	Source
September 6	Arkansas–Monticello	Alumni Field; Jackson, MS	W 28–0		
September 13	at Southwestern (TN)	Fargason Field; Memphis, TN	W 21–14	2,000	
September 27	Sewanee	Alumni Field; Jackson, MS	W 14–7		
October 4	at Trinity (TX)	San Antonio, TX	W 29–7	2,000	
October 18	McMurry	Alumni Field; Jackson, MS	W 30–6		
October 25	at Georgetown	Kehoe Field; Washington, D.C.	L 10–11	4,500	
November 1	Maryville (TN)	Alumni Field; Jackson, MS	W 28–0		
November 8	Austin	Alumni Field; Jackson, MS	W 38–0	500	
November 15	at Culver–Stockton	Canton, MO	W 40–0		
November 22	at Colorado College	Washburn Field; Colorado Springs, CO (NCAA Division III Quarterfinal)	W 28–21		
November 30	at Wittenberg	Wittenberg Stadium; Springfield, OH (NCAA Division III Semifinal)	L 22–55	2,500	
