= Robert Burt =

American physician (1873–1955)

Robert Tecumseh Burt
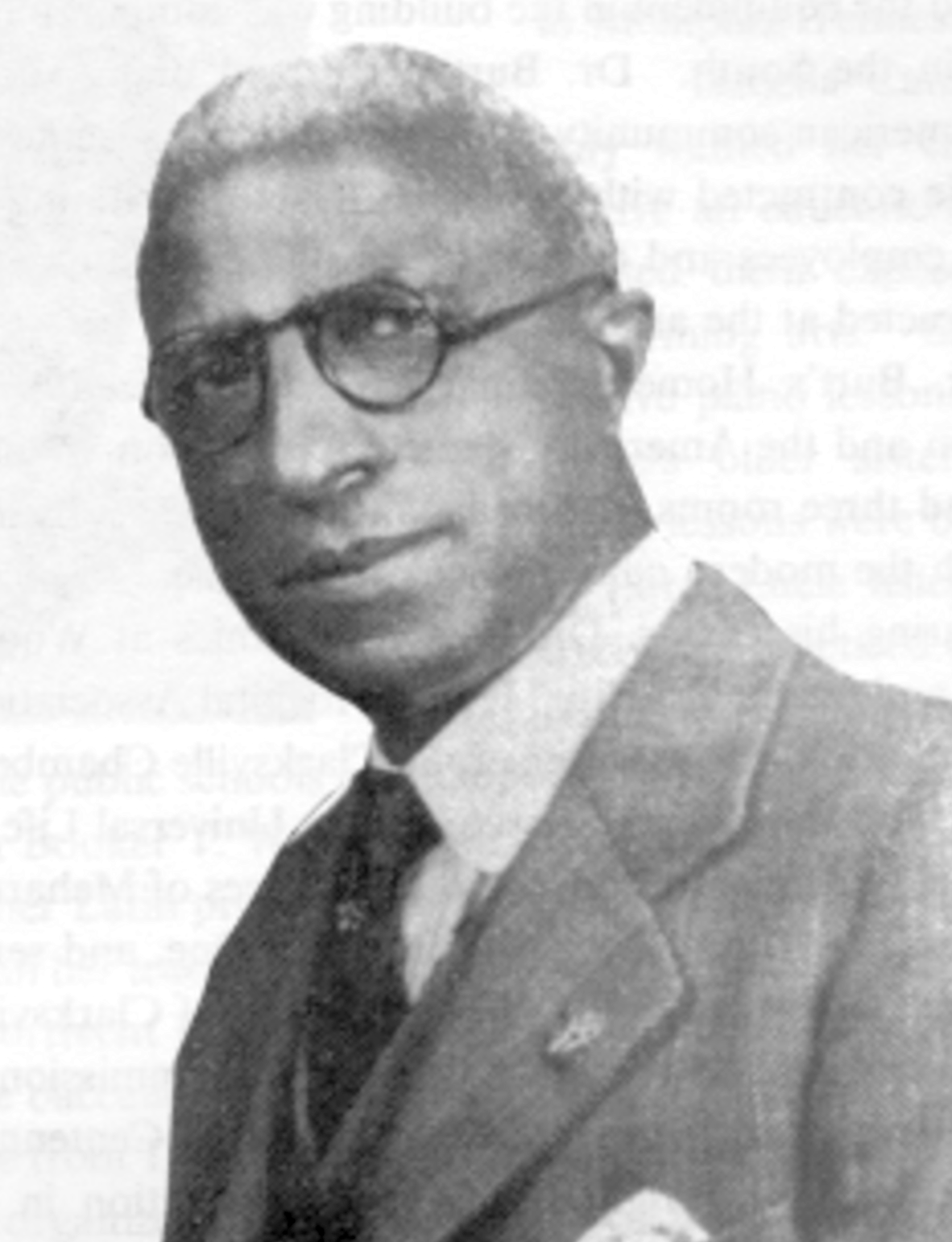
- Born: November 25, 1873; Attala County, Mississippi, U.S.
- Died: August 16, 1955 (aged 81)
- Education: Jackson College; Walden University; Central Mississippi College, Meharry Medical College; Harvard University; E.A. Printy School of Surgical Techniqu
- Occupations: Medical doctor, Surgeon, Teacher
- Known for: Operating the only hospital in Clarksville, Tennessee
- Medical career
- Profession: Physician, Surgeon
- Institutions: Home Infirmary (Clarksville, Tennessee); Bernard School (McMinnville, Tennessee)
- Sub-specialties: Abdominal surgery, c-sections

Robert Tecumseh Burt (November 25, 1873 – August 16, 1955) was an African-American medical doctor, surgeon, and teacher. He operated an infirmary and later the only hospital in Clarksville, Tennessee from 1906 to 1916.

== Early life and education ==
Robert Tecumseh Burt was born freed on November 25, 1873, in Attala County, Mississippi, to parents Sylvia (Sanders) and Robert Burt that had been enslaved. He was born in a one room dirt floor house on his grandfather's farm. Burt completed high school in Kosciusko, Mississippi.

He studied at Jackson College in Columbia, Tennessee; Walden University (B.A. degree) in Nashville, Tennessee; Central Mississippi College in Kosciusko, Mississippi; Meharry Medical College (M.A. degree 1897 in Nashville, Tennessee); and he did post-graduate work at Harvard University and E.A. Printy School of Surgical Technique.

== Career ==
He moved to Clarksville in 1904, where he set up a medical practice on Third Street. In 1906 Burt opened Clarksville’s first hospital called "Home Infirmary" near what is now Riverside Drive. Burt initially offered the facility for surgery within the African-American community, but it soon served all races who needed medical assistance. He was skilled at abdominal surgery and c-sections.

Burt also taught at Bernard School in McMinnville, Tennessee.

== Death and legacy ==
He was an active member of the community, until his death from an ongoing illness on August 16, 1955. He is remembered as a highly skilled surgeon and community leader; Burt High School and a community center were named in his memory in Clarksville.

The "Home Infirmary" building was destroyed by a fire in 1992, and the site now contains a historical marker.
