= 1980 Dayton Flyers football team =

American college football season

1980 Dayton Flyers football

NCAA Division III champion

Stagg Bowl, W 63–0 vs. Ithaca
- Conference: Independent
- Record: 14–0
- Head coach: Rick E. Carter (4th season)
- Defensive coordinator: Mike Kelly (3rd season)
- Captains: Jim O'Hara; Mark Schmitz; Tim Schoen
- Home stadium: Welcome Stadium

1980 NCAA Division III independents football records
	Conf.			Overall
Team	W	L	T	W		L		T
Dayton ^		–		14	–	0	–	0
Millsaps		–		9	–	0	–	0
Wabash		–		8	–	0	–	1
Illinois College		–		8	–	1	–	0
Hofstra		–		8	–	2	–	0
Wagner ^		–		8	–	2	–	0
DePauw		–		7	–	2	–	1
Salisbury State		–		7	–	3	–	1
Catholic University		–		6	–	3	–	0
WPI		–		5	–	3	–	0
Canisius		–		5	–	4	–	0
Brockport		–		5	–	4	–	1
Buffalo		–		6	–	5	–	0
Albany		–		5	–	5	–	0
Bishop		–		5	–	5	–	0
Georgetown		–		4	–	4	–	0
San Diego		–		5	–	5	–	0
UCF		–		4	–	4	–	1
Saint Mary's		–		5	–	6	–	0
Duquesne		–		4	–	5	–	0
Frostburg State		–		4	–	5	–	0
Grove City		–		4	–	5	–	0
Norwich		–		4	–	6	–	0
Rochester (NY)		–		3	–	5	–	1
St. Norbert		–		3	–	6	–	0
Cortland		–		3	–	7	–	0
Lowell		–		2	–	6	–	1
Colorado College		–		2	–	7	–	0
Saint Francis (PA)		–		2	–	7	–	0
Washington (MO)		–		2	–	7	–	0
Union (NY)		–		1	–	7	–	0
Fordham		–		0	–	9	–	0
Merchant Marine		–		0	–	11	–	0
^ – NCAA Division III playoff participant

The 1980 Dayton Flyers football team was an American football team that represented the University of Dayton as an independent during the 1980 NCAA Division III football season. In their fourth and final season under head coach Rick E. Carter, the Flyers compiled a 14–0 record and outscored opponents by a total of 509 to 70.

They participated in the NCAA Division III playoffs, defeating Baldwin–Wallace in the quarterfinals, Widener in the semifinals, and Ithaca (63-0) in the Stagg Bowl for the national championship.

Quarterback Jim O'Hara, linebacker Mark Schmitz, and strong safety Tim Schoen were the team captains. The team's statistical leaders included running back Gradlin Pruitt with 1,591 rushing yards and 1,980 yards of total offense and receiver Al Laubenthal with 883 receiving yards. Pruitt received the team's most valuable player award.

Ten days after the championship game, Carter resigned as Dayton's head coach to accept the same position at Holy Cross. In January 1981, he was voted as the Division III Coach of the Year by the American Football Coaches Association (AFCA).

The team played its home games at Welcome Stadium in Dayton, Ohio.

== Schedule ==
Date	Opponent	Site	Result	Attendance	Source
September 6	California (PA)	Welcome Stadium; Dayton, OH	W 20–0	9,218	
September 13	at Ashland	Ashland, OH	W 20–10	2,000	
September 20	Butler	Welcome Stadium; Dayton, OH	W 29–0	10,484	
September 27	Georgetown (KY)	Welcome Stadium; Dayton, OH	W 35–6	8,794	
October 4	Slippery Rock	Welcome Stadium; Dayton, OH	W 45–10	10,173	
October 11	at Frostburg State	Frostburg, MD	W 31–7	4,000	
October 18	at Merchant Marine	Tomb Field; Kings Point, NY	W 35–7	4,800	
October 25	Buffalo	Welcome Stadium; Dayton, OH	W 55–0	6,872	
November 1	Ferris State	Welcome Stadium; Dayton, OH	W 38–0	9,881	
November 8	at John Carroll	Cleveland, OH	W 41–3	3,500	
November 15	Wisconsin–Superior	Welcome Stadium; Dayton, OH	W 35–3	6,331	
November 22	Baldwin–Wallace	Welcome Stadium; Dayton, OH (NCAA Division III quarterfinal)	W 34–0	6,500	
November 30	at Widener	Chester, PA (NCAA Division III semifinal)	W 28–24		
December 6	vs. Ithaca	Phenix City, AL (Stagg Bowl—NCAA Division III championship game)	W 63–0	8,701	
