= 1980 Buffalo Bulls football team =

American college football season

1980 Buffalo Bulls football
- Conference: Independent
- Record: 6–5
- Head coach: Bill Dando (4th season)
- Captains: John Dunbar; Frank Price
- Home stadium: Rotary Field

1980 NCAA Division III independents football records
	Conf.			Overall
Team	W	L	T	W		L		T
Dayton ^		–		14	–	0	–	0
Millsaps		–		9	–	0	–	0
Wabash		–		8	–	0	–	1
Hofstra		–		8	–	2	–	0
Wagner ^		–		8	–	2	–	0
DePauw		–		7	–	2	–	1
Salisbury State		–		7	–	3	–	1
Catholic University		–		6	–	3	–	0
WPI		–		5	–	3	–	0
Canisius		–		5	–	4	–	0
Brockport		–		5	–	4	–	1
Buffalo		–		6	–	5	–	0
Albany		–		5	–	5	–	0
Georgetown		–		4	–	4	–	0
San Diego		–		5	–	5	–	0
UCF		–		4	–	4	–	1
Saint Mary's		–		5	–	6	–	0
Duquesne		–		4	–	5	–	0
Frostburg State		–		4	–	5	–	0
Grove City		–		4	–	5	–	0
Norwich		–		4	–	6	–	0
Rochester (NY)		–		3	–	5	–	1
St. Norbert		–		3	–	6	–	0
Cortland		–		3	–	7	–	0
Colorado College		–		2	–	7	–	0
Saint Francis (PA)		–		2	–	7	–	0
Union (NY)		–		1	–	7	–	0
Fordham		–		0	–	9	–	0
Merchant Marine		–		0	–	11	–	0
^ – NCAA Division III playoff participant

The 1980 Buffalo Bulls football team represented the University at Buffalo as an independent during the 1980 NCAA Division III football season. Led by Bill Dando in his fourth season as head coach, the team compiled a record of 6–5.

== Schedule ==
Date	Opponent	Site	Result	Attendance	Source
September 6	at Brockport	Brockport, NY	W 14–13	4,634	
September 13	at Cortland	Cortland, NY	W 20–14	2,000	
September 20	Grove City	Rotary Field; Buffalo, NY	W 3–2	4,122	
September 27	Hobart	Rotary Field; Buffalo, NY	W 6–0	4,651	
October 4	at Rochester	Rochester, NY	W 9–7	2,800	
October 11	Albany	Rotary Field; Buffalo, NY	L 24–27	3,188	
October 18	at Canisius	Buffalo, NY	L 14–17	2,086	
October 25	at Dayton	Welcome Stadium; Dayton, OH	L 0–55	6,872	
November 1	Edinboro	Rotary Field; Buffalo, NY	L 10–34	412	
November 8	at Baldwin–Wallace	Berea, OH	L 7–43	4,000	
November 15	Alfred	Rotary Field; Buffalo, NY	W 31–29	2,106	
