= 1973 Wittenberg Tigers football team =

American college football season

1973 Wittenberg Tigers football

NCAA Division III champion OAC champion OAC Red Division champion

OAC championship game, W 35–7 at Marietta

Amos Alonzo Stagg Bowl, W 41–0 vs. Juniata
- Conference: Ohio Athletic Conference
- Red Division
- Record: 12–0 (5–0 OAC)
- Head coach: Dave Maurer (5th season)
- Home stadium: Wittenberg Stadium

1973 Ohio Athletic Conference football standings
| | Conf. | | | | | Overall |
| Team | W | | L | | T | W | | L | | T |
|---|---|---|---|---|---|---|---|---|---|---|
Blue Division
| Marietta xy | 3 | – | 1 | – | 0 | 6 | – | 4 | – | 0 |
| Muskingum | 2 | – | 1 | – | 1 | 5 | – | 3 | – | 1 |
| Ohio Wesleyan | 2 | – | 1 | – | 1 | 3 | – | 5 | – | 1 |
| Otterbein | 1 | – | 2 | – | 1 | 4 | – | 4 | – | 1 |
| Denison | 0 | – | 3 | – | 1 | 3 | – | 5 | – | 1 |
Red Division
| No. 4 Wittenberg xy$^ | 5 | – | 0 | – | 0 | 12 | – | 0 | – | 0 |
| Baldwin–Wallace | 4 | – | 1 | – | 0 | 6 | – | 3 | – | 0 |
| Wooster | 3 | – | 2 | – | 0 | 5 | – | 3 | – | 0 |
| Heidelberg | 2 | – | 3 | – | 0 | 6 | – | 3 | – | 0 |
| Capital | 1 | – | 4 | – | 0 | 4 | – | 4 | – | 0 |
| Mount Union | 0 | – | 5 | – | 0 | 3 | – | 6 | – | 0 |
Not competing for championship
| Kenyon | | | – | | | 5 | – | 4 | – | 0 |
| Oberlin | | | – | | | 4 | – | 5 | – | 0 |
Championship: Wittenberg 35, Marietta 7
$ – Conference champion; x – Division champion/co-champions; y – Championship game participant; ^ – NCAA Division III playoff participant; Rankings from AP small college poll

The 1973 Wittenberg Tigers football team was an American football team that represented Wittenberg University in the Ohio Athletic Conference (OAC) during the 1973 NCAA Division III football season. In their fifth year under head coach Dave Maurer, the Tigers compiled a perfect 12–0 record and won the OAC championship, defeating Marietta (35–7) in the OAC championship game.

The Tigers qualified for the first-ever NCAA Division III playoffs where they defeated San Diego (21–14) in the semifinals, then shutting out Juniata (41–0) in the fifth annual Amos Alonzo Stagg Bowl. The Stagg Bowl had previously been a western region championship game and in 1973 became the official Division III national championship game.

At the end of the season, coach Maurer was honored by the American Football Coaches Association (AFCA) with its Kodak College Division Coach of the Year award. He was later inducted into the College Football Hall of Fame in 1991.

Senior offensive tackle Steve Drongowski received first-team honors on the Associated Press Little All-America team. He was also named a first-team player on the Kodak College Division All-America team. Drongowski also received the Mike Gregory Award as the most valuable offensive player in the OAC. Defensive back Randy DeMont received the Hank Critchfield Award as the OAC's most valuable defensive player.

Wittenberg played its home games at Wittenberg Stadium in Springfield, Ohio.

== Schedule ==
| Date | Opponent | Rank | Site | Result | Attendance | Source |
|---|---|---|---|---|---|---|
| September 15 | Central State (OH)* | | Wittenberg Stadium; Springfield, OH | W 42–13 | 3,400 | |
| September 22 | at Valparaiso* | | Valparaiso, IN | W 37–7 | | |
| September 29 | No. 7 Ashland* | | Wittenberg Stadium; Springfield, OH | W 24–7 | | |
| October 6 | Ohio Wesleyan* | | Wittenberg Stadium; Springfield, OH | W 41–7 | | |
| October 13 | Baldwin–Wallace*^{†} | No. 13 | Wittenberg Stadium; Springfield, OH | W 14–0 | | |
| October 20 | at Wooster | No. 9 | Wooster, OH | W 38–0 | | |
| October 27 | at Mount Union | No. 7 | Alliance, OH | W 35–17 | 5,500 | |
| November 3 | Heidelberg | No. 7 | Wittenberg Stadium; Springfield, OH | W 31–14 | 7,000 | |
| November 10 | at Capital | No. 6 | Columbus, OH | W 35–7 | | |
| November 17 | at Marietta* | No. 6 | Marietta, OH (OAC championship game) | W 35–7 | 1,500 | |
| December 1 | San Diego* | No. 4 | Wittenberg Stadium; Springfield, OH (NCAA Division III semifinal) | W 21–14 | 6,200 | |
| December 8 | vs. Juniata* | No. 4 | Phenix Municipal Stadium; Phenix City, AL (Stagg Bowl—NCAA Division III championship game | W 41–0 | | |
*Non-conference game; ^{†}Homecoming; Rankings from AP Poll released prior to the game
