= 1980 Wisconsin–Whitewater Warhawks football team =

American college football season

1980 Wisconsin–Whitewater Warhawks football

WIAC co-champion
- Conference: Wisconsin State University Conference
- Record: 8–3 (6–2 WSUC)
- Head coach: Forrest Perkins (24th season)
- Home stadium: Warhawks Stadium

1980 Wisconsin State University Conference football standings
| | Conf. | | | | | Overall |
| Team | W | | L | | T | W | | L | | T |
|---|---|---|---|---|---|---|---|---|---|---|
| No. 14 Wisconsin–La Crosse + | 6 | – | 2 | – | 0 | 8 | – | 2 | – | 0 |
| No. 13 Wisconsin–River Falls + | 6 | – | 2 | – | 0 | 8 | – | 2 | – | 0 |
| Wisconsin–Whitewater + | 6 | – | 2 | – | 0 | 8 | – | 3 | – | 0 |
| Wisconsin–Platteville + | 6 | – | 2 | – | 0 | 7 | – | 3 | – | 0 |
| Wisconsin–Stout | 5 | – | 3 | – | 0 | 6 | – | 4 | – | 0 |
| Wisconsin–Oshkosh | 3 | – | 5 | – | 0 | 4 | – | 6 | – | 0 |
| Wisconsin–Stevens Point | 2 | – | 6 | – | 0 | 4 | – | 6 | – | 0 |
| Wisconsin–Eau Claire | 2 | – | 6 | – | 0 | 3 | – | 8 | – | 0 |
| Wisconsin–Superior | 0 | – | 8 | – | 0 | 0 | – | 10 | – | 0 |
+ – Conference co-champions; Rankings from NAIA Division I poll

The 1980 Wisconsin–Whitewater Warhawks football team represented the University of Wisconsin–Whitewater as a member of the Wisconsin State University Conference (WSUC) during the 1980 NCAA Division III football season.

== Schedule ==
| Date | Opponent | Site | Result |
|---|---|---|---|
| September 6 | Lakeland* | Warhawks Stadium; Whitewater, WI | W 57–0 |
| September 13 | at Wisconsin–Platteville | Platteville, WI | W 31–20 |
| September 20 | Wisconsin–Superior | Warhawks Stadium; Whitewater, WI | W 42–14 |
| September 27 | Wisconsin–Stevens Point | Warhawks Stadium; Whitewater, WI | W 27–3 |
| October 4 | at Wisconsin–Stout | Menomonie, WI | W 24–7 |
| October 11 | at Northern Michigan* | Marquette, Michigan | L 7–55 |
| October 18 | Wisconsin–River Falls | Warhawks Stadium; Whitewater, WI | W 25–22 |
| October 25 | at Wisconsin–Eau Claire | Eau Claire, WI | L 20–34 |
| November 1 | Wisconsin–La Crosse | Warhawks Stadium; Whitewater, WI | L 16–31 |
| November 8 | at Wisconsin–Oshkosh | Titan Stadium; Oshkosh, WI | W 45–13 |
| November 15 | Milton* | Warhawks Stadium; Whitewater, WI | W 44–6 |
*Non-conference game
