= 1975 Wittenberg Tigers football team =

American college football season

1975 Wittenberg Tigers football

NCAA Division III champion OAC Blue Division champion

OAC championship game, L 0–9 vs. Muskingum

Stagg Bowl, W 28–0 vs. Ithaca
- Conference: Ohio Athletic Conference
- Blue Division
- Record: 12–1 (4–0 OAC)
- Head coach: Dave Maurer (7th season)
- Home stadium: Wittenberg Stadium

1975 Ohio Athletic Conference football standings
	Conf.					Overall
Team	W		L		T	W		L		T
Blue Division
Wittenberg xy$^	4	–	0	–	0	12	–	1	–	0
Denison	3	–	1	–	0	5	–	4	–	0
Mount Union	2	–	2	–	0	7	–	2	–	0
Ohio Wesleyan	1	–	3	–	0	4	–	5	–	0
Capital	0	–	4	–	0	1	–	8	–	0
Red Division
Muskingum xy	4	–	1	–	0	6	–	4	–	0
Baldwin–Wallace	4	–	1	–	0	7	–	2	–	0
Marietta	3	–	2	–	0	4	–	5	–	0
Heidelberg	3	–	2	–	0	3	–	6	–	0
Otterbein	1	–	4	–	0	4	–	5	–	0
Wooster	0	–	5	–	0	1	–	8	–	0
Not competing for championship
Ohio Northern			–			4	–	4	–	1
Kenyon			–			3	–	6	–	0
Oberlin			–			2	–	4	–	0
Championship: Muskingum 9, Wittenberg 0
$ – Conference champion; x – Division champion/co-champions; y – Championship game participant; ^ – NCAA Division III playoff participant

The 1975 Wittenberg Tigers football team was an American football team that represented Wittenberg University in the Ohio Athletic Conference (OAC) during the 1975 NCAA Division III football season. In their fifth year under head coach Dave Maurer, the Tigers compiled a 12–1 record, lost to Muskingum in the OAC championship game, and qualified for the first NCAA Division III playoffs. In the playoffs, they defeated Indiana Central in the first round, Millsaps in the semifinals, and Ithaca in the national championship game.

== Schedule ==
Date	Opponent	Site	Result	Attendance	Source
September 13	Baldwin–Wallace*	Wittenberg Stadium; Springfield, OH	W 19–0	2,850	
September 20	at Delaware*	Delaware Stadium; Newark, DE	W 14–8	20,132	
September 27	Muskingum*	Wittenberg Stadium; Springfield, OH	W 20–16		
October 4	at West Liberty*	West Liberty, WV	W 34–6		
October 11	at Hillsdale*	Hillsdale, MI	W 10–7		
October 18	Denison	Wittenberg Stadium; Springfield, OH	W 24–0	2,200	
October 25	at Mount Union	Alliance, OH	W 17–10		
November 1	Ohio Wesleyan	Wittenberg Stadium; Springfield, OH	W 45–16	6,200	
November 8	at Capital	Columbus, OH	W 24–19		
November 15	vs. Muskingum*	George Finnie Stadium; Berea, OH (OAC championship game)	L 0–9		
November 22	Indiana Central*	Wittenberg Stadium; Springfield, OH (NCAA Division III quarterfinal)	W 14–13	1,750	
December 1	Millsaps*	Wittenberg Stadium; Springfield, OH (NCAA Division III semifinal)	W 55–22	2,500	
December 6	vs. Ithaca*	Garrett–Harrison Stadium; Phenix City, AL (Stagg Bowl—NCAA Division III championship game)	W 28–0	6,000	
*Non-conference game
