= 1980 Millsaps Majors football team =

American college football season

1980 Millsaps Majors football
- Conference: Independent
- Record: 9–0
- Head coach: Harper Davis (17th season)
- Home stadium: Alumni Field

1980 NCAA Division III independents football records
	Conf.			Overall
Team	W	L	T	W		L		T
Dayton ^		–		14	–	0	–	0
Millsaps		–		9	–	0	–	0
Wabash		–		8	–	0	–	1
Hofstra		–		8	–	2	–	0
Wagner ^		–		8	–	2	–	0
DePauw		–		7	–	2	–	1
Salisbury State		–		7	–	3	–	1
Catholic University		–		6	–	3	–	0
WPI		–		5	–	3	–	0
Canisius		–		5	–	4	–	0
Brockport		–		5	–	4	–	1
Buffalo		–		6	–	5	–	0
Albany		–		5	–	5	–	0
Georgetown		–		4	–	4	–	0
San Diego		–		5	–	5	–	0
UCF		–		4	–	4	–	1
Saint Mary's		–		5	–	6	–	0
Duquesne		–		4	–	5	–	0
Frostburg State		–		4	–	5	–	0
Grove City		–		4	–	5	–	0
Norwich		–		4	–	6	–	0
Rochester (NY)		–		3	–	5	–	1
St. Norbert		–		3	–	6	–	0
Cortland		–		3	–	7	–	0
Colorado College		–		2	–	7	–	0
Saint Francis (PA)		–		2	–	7	–	0
Union (NY)		–		1	–	7	–	0
Fordham		–		0	–	9	–	0
Merchant Marine		–		0	–	11	–	0
^ – NCAA Division III playoff participant

The 1980 Millsaps Majors football team was an American football team that represented Millsaps College as an independent during the 1980 NCAA Division III football season. In their 17th year under head coach Harper Davis, the team compiled a perfect 9–0 record. The team broke the Millsaps single-game scoring record with 84 points against landmark College in the final game of the season. It was the first undefeated season in Millsaps history.

The team ran a rushing-based offense, tallying 2,612 rushing yards and only 633 passing yards. The individual statistical leaders included tailback James Henley with 70 points scored and 573 rushing yards on 80 carries (7.2 yards per carry), quarterback Chris Busick with 303 passing yards (20-34-1), and M. Smith with 10 receptions for 228 yards.

The team played its home games at Alumni Field in Jackson, Mississippi.

== Schedule ==
Date	Opponent	Site	Result	Attendance	Source
September 6	Fisk	Alumni Field; Jackson, MS	W 51–0	2,000	
September 13	at Southwestern (TN)	Memphis, TN	W 26–10	2,300	
September 20	at Sewanee	Sewanee, TN	W 33–7	2,000	
September 27	at UCF	Orlando Stadium; Orlando, FL	W 8–7	12,793	
October 4	Saint Leo	Alumni Field; Jackson, MS	W 67–0	2,300	
October 11	vs. Baptist University	Atlanta, GA	W 57–0	2,000	
October 18	Baptist Christian^{†}	Alumni Field; Jackson, MS	W 7–0	2,400	
October 25	at Maryville	Maryville, TN	W 17–7	2,100	
November 8	Landmark	Alumni Field; Jackson, MS	W 84–0	2,300	
^{†}Homecoming
