= 1973 Madison Dukes football team =

American college football season

1973 Madison Dukes football
- Conference: Independent
- Record: 4–5
- Head coach: Challace McMillin (2nd season)
- Home stadium: Madison Field

1973 NCAA Division III independents football records
| | Conf. | | | Overall |
| Team | W | L | T | W | | L | | T |
|---|---|---|---|---|---|---|---|---|
| Colorado College | | – | | 9 | – | 1 | – | 0 |
| Bridgeport ^ | | – | | 9 | – | 2 | – | 0 |
| San Diego ^ | | – | | 9 | – | 2 | – | 1 |
| Albany | | – | | 7 | – | 2 | – | 0 |
| Salisbury State | | – | | 7 | – | 2 | – | 0 |
| Ashland | | – | | 7 | – | 3 | – | 0 |
| Norwich | | – | | 6 | – | 3 | – | 0 |
| Rochester (NY) | | – | | 6 | – | 3 | – | 0 |
| Brockport | | – | | 5 | – | 3 | – | 0 |
| Maryville (TN) | | – | | 5 | – | 4 | – | 0 |
| Millsaps | | – | | 5 | – | 4 | – | 0 |
| Madison | | – | | 4 | – | 5 | – | 0 |
| St. Norbert | | – | | 4 | – | 5 | – | 0 |
| Lake Forest | | – | | 3 | – | 4 | – | 1 |
| Saint Mary's | | – | | 3 | – | 4 | – | 1 |
| Georgetown | | – | | 3 | – | 5 | – | 0 |
| Grove City | | – | | 2 | – | 6 | – | 1 |
| Cortland | | – | | 1 | – | 7 | – | 1 |
| Chicago | | – | | 0 | – | 6 | – | 1 |
^ – NCAA Division III playoff participant

The 1973 Madison Dukes football team was an American football team that represented Madison College (now known as James Madison University) during the 1973 NCAA Division III football season as an independent. Led by second-year head coach Challace McMillin, the Dukes compiled a record of 4–5.

== Schedule ==
| Date | Opponent | Site | Result | Source |
|---|---|---|---|---|
| September 22 | Anne Arundel Community College | Madison Field; Harrisonburg, VA | W 34–8 | |
| September 28 | Hampden–Sydney JV | Madison Field; Harrisonburg, VA | L 14–17 | |
| October 6 | at Hargrave Military Academy | Chatham, VA | W 16–6 | |
| October 13 | Salisbury State | Madison Field; Harrisonburg, VA | L 7–42 | |
| October 20 | Shepherd JV | Madison Field; Harrisonburg, VA | W 23–10 | |
| October 27 | Massanutten Military Academy | Madison Field; Harrisonburg, VA | L 6–17 | |
| November 3 | at Fork Union Military Academy | Fork Union, VA | L 20–24 | |
| November 10 | at Staunton Military Academy | Memorial Stadium; Staunton, VA | L 29–41 | |
| November 17 | at Gallaudet | Hotchkiss Field; Washington, DC | W 40–12 | |
