= Bud Sims =

American football coach

Biographical details
- Education: Bethany (KS)

Coaching career (HC unless noted)
- 1970–1974: RIT (DC)
- 1975: Brockport (DC)
- 1976–1982: Brockport
- 1995–2019: St. John Fisher (TE/OT)

Head coaching record
- Overall: 28–35–2

Charles "Bud" Sims is an American football coach. He was the tackles and tight ends coach at St. John Fisher College. Sims was the head football coach at The College at Brockport, State University of New York in Brockport, New York from 1976 to 1982, where he completed a record of 28–35–2.

from 1970 to 1974, Sims was the defensive coordinator at the Rochester Institute of Technology, where he worked under head coach Tom Coughlin.

== Head coaching record ==
Year	Team	Overall	Conference	Standing	Bowl/playoffs
Brockport Golden Eagles (NCAA Division III independent) (1976–1982)
1976	Brockport	3–5–1			
1977	Brockport	4–5			
1978	Brockport	5–4			
1979	Brockport	5–4			
1980	Brockport	5–4–1			
1981	Brockport	5–5			
1982	Brockport	1–8			
Brockport:		28–35–2			
Total:		28–35–2			
