= 1973 San Diego Toreros football team =

American college football season

1973 San Diego Toreros football

NCAA Division III Semifinal, L 14–21 vs. Wittenberg
- Conference: Independent
- Record: 9–2–1
- Head coach: Andy Vinci (2nd season)
- Home stadium: USD Stadium

1973 NCAA Division III independents football records
	Conf.			Overall
Team	W	L	T	W		L		T
Colorado College		–		9	–	1	–	0
Bridgeport ^		–		9	–	2	–	0
San Diego ^		–		9	–	2	–	1
Albany		–		7	–	2	–	0
Salisbury State		–		7	–	2	–	0
Ashland		–		7	–	3	–	0
Norwich		–		6	–	3	–	0
Rochester (NY)		–		6	–	3	–	0
Brockport		–		5	–	3	–	0
Maryville (TN)		–		5	–	4	–	0
Millsaps		–		5	–	4	–	0
Madison		–		4	–	5	–	0
St. Norbert		–		4	–	5	–	0
Lake Forest		–		3	–	4	–	1
Saint Mary's		–		3	–	4	–	1
Georgetown		–		3	–	5	–	0
Grove City		–		2	–	6	–	1
Cortland		–		1	–	7	–	1
Chicago		–		0	–	6	–	1
^ – NCAA Division III playoff participant

The 1973 San Diego Toreros football team was an American football team that represented the University of San Diego as an independent in the 1973 NCAA Division III football season. In their second and final season under head coach Andy Vinci, the Toreros compiled a 9–2–1, outscored opponents by a total of 455 to 169, and lost to Wittenberg in the NCAA Division III Semifinals.

The 1973 season was San Diego's first in the NCAA, having competed as a club program for the previous four seasons. In its first season of NCAA competition, the Toreros led Division III with averages of 441 yards of total offense, 231.7 passing yards, and 40.2 points per game, and advanced to the four-team Division III playoffs.

When Coach Vinci came to San Diego in December 1971, he inherited a club program that had won only five games in the previous two seasons, operated on a $10,000 budget, and played on a field that was described as "little more than a dirt bowl filled with gopher holes and a rut down the middle, no lights, insufficient parking and poor facilities for coaches and players." Vinci raised funds with a combination of loans and donations and rebuilt the program's facilities. Vinci said, "I even learned how to run a bulldozer."

During the 1973 season, four San Diego players broke school records on offense: 1) Rich Paulson set school records with 16 rushing touchdowns, 96 points scored, and an average of 6.3 yards per carry; 2) quarterback Bob Dulich led all players in Division III with an average of 231.2 yards of total offense per game, and broke the schools' single-season records with 2,538 passing yards, 2,773 yards of total offense, and 21 touchdown passes and the single-game record with 389 yards against USIU; 3) Ernie Yarbrough broke single-season receiving records with 1,102 receiving yards and 67 receptions; and 4) Doug Rothrock broke a single-season record with 49 successful extra point kicks and eight successful extra point kicks in one game.

== Schedule ==
Date	Opponent	Site	Result	Attendance	Source
September 15	UC Riverside	USD Stadium; San Diego, CA	L 16–20		
September 22	at Claremont-Mudd	Claremont, CA	W 35–7		
September 29	Occidental	USD Stadium; San Diego, CA	W 34–14		
October 6	Pomona	USD Stadium; San Diego, CA	W 57–7	3,069	
October 13	at La Verne	La Verne, CA	W 31–14		
October 20	at Saint Mary's	Moraga, CA	W 46–0		
October 27	at Humboldt State	Redwood Bowl; Arcata, CA	T 28–28	2,000–3,500	
November 3	Azusa Pacific	USD Stadium; San Diego, CA	W 47–11		
November 10	United States International	San Diego, CA	W 56–20		
November 17	Loyola (CA)	USD Stadium; San Diego, CA	W 61–0	750	
November 24	Cal State Los Angeles	USD Stadium; San Diego, CA	W 30–27	2,000–2,354	
December 1	at No. 4 Wittenberg	Wittenberg Stadium; Springfield, OH (NCAA Division III Semifinal)	L 14–21	6,200	
Rankings from AP Poll released prior to the game
