= Andy Vinci =

American football coach

Biographical details
- Born: c. 1940

Coaching career (HC unless noted)
- 1970: Desert (assistant)
- 1972–1973: San Diego
- 1974–1976: Cal Poly Pomona

Head coaching record
- Overall: 30–17–6
- Tournaments: 0–1 (NCAA D-III playoffs)

Andy Vinci (born c. 1940) is an American former football coach. He served as the head football coach at the University of San Diego in 1973 and at California State Polytechnic University, Pomona from 1974 to 1976, compiling a career college football record of 30–17–6. Vinci resigned from his post at Cal Poly Pomona in December 1976.

== Head coaching record ==
Year	Team	Overall	Conference	Standing	Bowl/playoffs
San Diego Toreros (NCAA College Division independent) (1972)
1972	San Diego	6–3–1			
San Diego Toreros (NCAA Division III independent) (1973)
1973	San Diego	9–2–1			L NCAA Division III Semifinal
San Diego:		15–5–2			
Cal Poly Pomona Broncos (California Collegiate Athletic Association) (1974–1976)
1974	Cal Poly Pomona	5–3–2	1–1–2	3rd	
1975	Cal Poly Pomona	6–4–1	2–2	3rd	
1976	Cal Poly Pomona	4–5–1	1–1	2nd	
Cal Poly Pomona:		15–12–4	4–4–2		
Total:		30–17–6			
