= 1973 NCAA Division III football season =

American college football season

- Regular season: August – November 1973
- Playoffs: November – December 1973
- National championship: Garrett–Harrison Stadium; Phenix City, AL
- Champion: Wittenberg

The 1973 NCAA Division III football season, part of college football in the United States organized by the National Collegiate Athletic Association at the Division III level, began in August 1973, and concluded with the NCAA Division III Football Championship in December 1973 at Garrett–Harrison Stadium in Phenix City, Alabama. This was the first season for Division III (and Division II) football, which were formerly in the College Division in 1972 and prior.

Wittenberg won their first Division III championship, defeating Juniata in the championship game by a score of 41−0.

== Conference changes and new programs ==
School	1972 conference	1973 conference
Albany	New program	NCAA Division III independent
Seton Hall	New program	Metropolitan Interscholastic Conference
Salisbury State	New program	NCAA Division III independent

== Conference standings ==
1973 College Athletic Conference football standings
	Conf.					Overall
Team	W		L		T	W		L		T
Southwestern (TN) $	2	–	0	–	0	4	–	3	–	2
Sewanee	1	–	1	–	0	5	–	3	–	0
Centre	0	–	2	–	0	0	–	9	–	0
$ – Conference champion

1973 College Conference of Illinois and Wisconsin football standings
	Conf.					Overall
Team	W		L		T	W		L		T
No. 4 Carthage $^	8	–	0	–	0	8	–	2	–	0
No. 12 Millikin	6	–	2	–	0	8	–	2	–	0
No. 15 Augustana (IL)	6	–	2	–	0	7	–	2	–	0
Illinois Wesleyan	5	–	3	–	0	5	–	4	–	0
Carroll (WI)	3	–	5	–	0	4	–	5	–	0
Elmhurst	3	–	5	–	0	4	–	5	–	0
North Park	2	–	6	–	0	3	–	6	–	0
Wheaton (IL)	2	–	6	–	0	2	–	7	–	0
North Central (IL)	1	–	7	–	0	2	–	7	–	0
$ – Conference champion; ^ – NAIA Division II playoff participant; Rankings from NAIA Division II poll

1973 Eastern Football Conference football standings
	Conf.					Overall
Team	W		L		T	W		L		T
Central Connecticut State $	3	–	0	–	0	9	–	1	–	0
Southern Connecticut State	2	–	1	–	0	6	–	4	–	0
Montclair State	1	–	2	–	0	6	–	4	–	0
Glassboro State	0	–	3	–	0	4	–	6	–	0
$ – Conference champion

1973 Independent College Athletic Conference football standings
	Conf.					Overall
Team	W		L		T	W		L		T
Hobart $	3	–	1	–	1	7	–	1	–	1
Alfred	2	–	1	–	0	7	–	2	–	0
St. Lawrence	2	–	2	–	0	5	–	3	–	0
RIT	0	–	2	–	1	3	–	5	–	1
RPI	0	–	3	–	0	1	–	9	–	0
Ithaca *	2	–	0	–	0	5	–	4	–	0
$ – Conference champion; * – Did not complete for title

1973 Indiana Collegiate Conference football standings
	Conf.					Overall
Team	W		L		T	W		L		T
Butler $	5	–	1	–	0	5	–	5	–	0
DePauw	4	–	2	–	0	6	–	3	–	0
Evansville	3	–	2	–	0	5	–	5	–	0
Indiana Central	3	–	3	–	0	7	–	3	–	0
Valparaiso	3	–	3	–	0	6	–	5	–	0
Saint Joseph's (IN)	1	–	4	–	0	3	–	7	–	0
Wabash	0	–	4	–	0	5	–	5	–	0
$ – Conference champion

1973 Iowa Conference football standings
	Conf.					Overall
Team	W		L		T	W		L		T
No. 9 Buena Vista $	7	–	0	–	0	8	–	1	–	0
Central (IA)	6	–	1	–	0	7	–	2	–	0
Wartburg	4	–	3	–	0	5	–	4	–	0
Dubuque	3	–	3	–	1	5	–	4	–	1
William Penn	3	–	4	–	0	6	–	4	–	0
Luther	2	–	4	–	1	2	–	6	–	1
Simpson (IA)	1	–	5	–	1	2	–	6	–	1
Upper Iowa	0	–	6	–	1	1	–	7	–	1
$ – Conference champion; Rankings from NAIA Division II poll

1973 Mason–Dixon Conference football standings
	Conf.					Overall
Team	W		L		T	W		L		T
Hampden–Sydney $	3	–	1	–	0	7	–	3	–	0
Johns Hopkins	2	–	0	–	0	6	–	3	–	0
Bridgewater	2	–	1	–	0	5	–	4	–	0
Randolph–Macon	2	–	1	–	0	5	–	5	–	0
Western Maryland	0	–	3	–	0	5	–	4	–	0
Towson State	0	–	3	–	0	4	–	4	–	0
Gallaudet	0	–	0	–	0	1	–	8	–	0
$ – Conference champion

1973 Metropolitan Intercollegiate Conference football standings
	Conf.					Overall
Team	W		L		T	W		L		T
C. W. Post $	5	–	0	–	0	10	–	1	–	0
Hofstra	4	–	1	–	0	8	–	3	–	0
Fordham	2	–	2	–	0	6	–	4	–	0
Merchant Marine	1	–	2	–	0	5	–	5	–	0
Seton Hall	0	–	2	–	0	3	–	4	–	0
Saint Peter's	0	–	2	–	0	0	–	9	–	0
Wagner	0	–	3	–	0	4	–	5	–	0
$ – Conference champion

1973 Michigan Intercollegiate Athletic Association football standings
	Conf.					Overall
Team	W		L		T	W		L		T
Hope $	5	–	0	–	0	7	–	2	–	0
Olivet	3	–	2	–	0	6	–	3	–	0
Albion	3	–	2	–	0	3	–	6	–	0
Alma	2	–	3	–	0	5	–	4	–	0
Kalamazoo	2	–	3	–	0	4	–	4	–	0
Adrian	0	–	5	–	0	1	–	8	–	0
$ – Conference champion

1973 Middle Atlantic Conference football standings
	Conf.					Overall
Team	W		L		T	W		L		T
Northern Division
Juniata x^	5	–	1	–	0	10	–	2	–	0
Wilkes	5	–	1	–	0	5	–	3	–	0
Albright	5	–	3	–	0	5	–	5	–	0
Delaware Valley	4	–	3	–	1	4	–	3	–	0
Lycoming	2	–	5	–	0	2	–	6	–	0
Susquehanna	1	–	6	–	0	2	–	7	–	0
Upsala	0	–	7	–	0	1	–	8	–	0
Wagner *	2	–	1	–	0	4	–	5	–	0
Southern Division
Franklin & Marshall x	8	–	1	–	0	8	–	1	–	0
Widener	7	–	1	–	0	8	–	1	–	0
Muhlenberg	7	–	1	–	1	7	–	1	–	1
Johns Hopkins	4	–	2	–	0	6	–	3	–	0
Western Maryland	4	–	2	–	0	5	–	4	–	0
Moravian	3	–	5	–	1	3	–	5	–	1
Lebanon Valley	2	–	5	–	2	2	–	5	–	2
Dickinson	1	–	5	–	2	1	–	5	–	2
Ursinus	1	–	5	–	1	2	–	5	–	1
Swarthmore	0	–	7	–	0	0	–	7	–	0
x – Division champion/co-champions; ^ – NCAA Division III playoff participant; * – Ineligible due to insufficient conference games Juniata won Northern Section on Hazlett point system

1973 Midwest Conference football standings
	Conf.					Overall
Team	W		L		T	W		L		T
Coe $	7	–	1	–	0	8	–	1	–	0
Monmouth (IL)	6	–	1	–	1	6	–	1	–	1
Knox	5	–	2	–	1	6	–	2	–	1
Ripon	5	–	2	–	1	5	–	3	–	1
St. Olaf	5	–	3	–	0	5	–	4	–	0
Lawrence	4	–	4	–	0	4	–	4	–	0
Carleton	3	–	4	–	1	3	–	4	–	1
Cornell (IA)	2	–	6	–	0	3	–	6	–	0
Beloit	1	–	7	–	0	1	–	8	–	0
Grinnell	0	–	8	–	0	0	–	9	–	0
$ – Conference champion

1973 Minnesota Intercollegiate Athletic Conference football standings
	Conf.					Overall
Team	W		L		T	W		L		T
No. 11 St. Thomas (MN) +	6	–	1	–	0	9	–	1	–	0
No. 9 Minnesota–Duluth +	6	–	1	–	0	8	–	1	–	0
Augsburg	5	–	2	–	0	7	–	2	–	0
Gustavus Adolphus	4	–	3	–	0	5	–	5	–	0
Concordia–Moorhead	3	–	4	–	0	5	–	5	–	0
Saint John's (MN)	3	–	4	–	0	4	–	4	–	0
Hamline	1	–	6	–	0	3	–	6	–	0
Macalester	0	–	7	–	0	1	–	9	–	0
+ – Conference co-champions; Rankings from NAIA Division I poll

1973 New England Football Conference standings
	Conf.					Overall
Team	W		L		T	W		L		T
Nichols $	4	–	0	–	0	8	–	1	–	0
Plymouth State	3	–	2	–	0	6	–	2	–	0
Bridgewater State	2	–	2	–	0	5	–	5	–	0
Curry	2	–	2	–	1	3	–	5	–	1
Maine Maritime	2	–	3	–	0	4	–	5	–	0
Boston State	0	–	4	–	1	1	–	6	–	1
$ – Conference champion

1973 New Jersey State Athletic Conference football standings
	Conf.					Overall
Team	W		L		T	W		L		T
Montclair State $	4	–	0	–	0	6	–	4	–	0
Jersey City State	4	–	1	–	0	9	–	1	–	0
Trenton State	3	–	2	–	0	7	–	3	–	0
Glassboro State	2	–	3	–	0	4	–	6	–	0
Kean	1	–	3	–	0	4	–	5	–	0
William Paterson	0	–	5	–	0	3	–	7	–	0
$ – Conference champion

1973 Ohio Athletic Conference football standings
	Conf.					Overall
Team	W		L		T	W		L		T
Blue Division
Marietta xy	3	–	1	–	0	6	–	4	–	0
Muskingum	2	–	1	–	1	5	–	3	–	1
Ohio Wesleyan	2	–	1	–	1	3	–	5	–	1
Otterbein	1	–	2	–	1	4	–	4	–	1
Denison	0	–	3	–	1	3	–	5	–	1
Red Division
No. 4 Wittenberg xy$^	5	–	0	–	0	12	–	0	–	0
Baldwin–Wallace	4	–	1	–	0	6	–	3	–	0
Wooster	3	–	2	–	0	5	–	3	–	0
Heidelberg	2	–	3	–	0	6	–	3	–	0
Capital	1	–	4	–	0	4	–	4	–	0
Mount Union	0	–	5	–	0	3	–	6	–	0
Not competing for championship
Kenyon			–			5	–	4	–	0
Oberlin			–			4	–	5	–	0
Championship: Wittenberg 35, Marietta 7
$ – Conference champion; x – Division champion/co-champions; y – Championship game participant; ^ – NCAA Division III playoff participant; Rankings from AP small college poll

1973 Pennsylvania State Athletic Conference football standings
	Conf.					Overall
Team	W		L		T	W		L		T
East Division
West Chester xy	4	–	0	–	0	5	–	5	–	0
East Stroudsburg	5	–	1	–	0	6	–	1	–	1
Millersville	4	–	2	–	0	7	–	2	–	0
Cheyney	3	–	2	–	0	5	–	4	–	0
Bloomsburg	2	–	4	–	0	4	–	5	–	0
Kutztown	1	–	5	–	0	2	–	7	–	0
Mansfield	0	–	5	–	0	1	–	7	–	0
West Division
No. T–20 Slippery Rock xy$	5	–	0	–	0	8	–	2	–	0
Clarion	3	–	2	–	0	5	–	4	–	0
Edinboro	3	–	2	–	0	4	–	4	–	1
Lock Haven	2	–	3	–	0	2	–	7	–	0
California (PA)	1	–	4	–	0	3	–	6	–	0
Shippensburg	1	–	4	–	0	2	–	7	–	0
Indiana (PA) *	0	–	0	–	0	4	–	5	–	0
Championship: Slippery Rock 28, West Chester 14
$ – Conference champion; x – Division champion/co-champions; y – Championship game participant; * – Ineligible for conference title; Rankings from NAIA Division I poll

1973 Presidents' Athletic Conference football standings
	Conf.					Overall
Team	W		L		T	W		L		T
John Carroll $	5	–	0	–	2	7	–	1	–	2
Allegheny	5	–	1	–	1	5	–	3	–	1
Thiel	4	–	2	–	1	6	–	2	–	1
Hiram	4	–	3	–	0	5	–	4	–	0
Carnegie Mellon	4	–	3	–	0	5	–	3	–	0
Bethany (WV)	2	–	5	–	0	3	–	5	–	1
Washington & Jefferson	2	–	5	–	0	2	–	7	–	0
Case Western Reserve	0	–	7	–	0	0	–	9	–	0
$ – Conference champion

1973 Southern California Intercollegiate Athletic Conference football standings
	Conf.					Overall
Team	W		L		T	W		L		T
No. 10 Redlands $	5	–	0	–	0	8	–	1	–	0
Whittier	3	–	2	–	0	6	–	3	–	0
La Verne	3	–	2	–	0	4	–	5	–	0
Claremont-Mudd	2	–	3	–	0	3	–	5	–	0
Occidental	2	–	3	–	0	2	–	6	–	0
Pomona-Pitzer	0	–	5	–	0	1	–	7	–	1
$ – Conference champion; Rankings from NAIA Division II poll

1973 Wisconsin State University Conference football standings
	Conf.					Overall
Team	W		L		T	W		L		T
No. 6 Wisconsin–La Crosse $^	7	–	1	–	0	9	–	2	–	0
No. 14 Wisconsin–Platteville	6	–	1	–	1	8	–	1	–	1
Wisconsin–Whitewater	4	–	2	–	2	6	–	2	–	2
Wisconsin–Eau Claire	4	–	4	–	0	5	–	5	–	0
Wisconsin–Oshkosh	4	–	4	–	0	4	–	6	–	0
Wisconsin–River Falls	3	–	4	–	1	4	–	5	–	1
Wisconsin–Stevens Point	3	–	5	–	0	4	–	6	–	0
Wisconsin–Superior	2	–	6	–	0	2	–	8	–	0
Wisconsin–Stout	1	–	7	–	0	1	–	9	–	0
$ – Conference champion; ^ – NAIA Division I playoff participant; Rankings from NAIA Division I poll

1973 NCAA Division III independents football records
	Conf.			Overall
Team	W	L	T	W		L		T
Colorado College		–		9	–	1	–	0
Bridgeport ^		–		9	–	2	–	0
San Diego ^		–		9	–	2	–	1
Albany		–		7	–	2	–	0
Salisbury State		–		7	–	2	–	0
Ashland		–		7	–	3	–	0
Norwich		–		6	–	3	–	0
Rochester (NY)		–		6	–	3	–	0
Brockport		–		5	–	3	–	0
Maryville (TN)		–		5	–	4	–	0
Millsaps		–		5	–	4	–	0
Madison		–		4	–	5	–	0
St. Norbert		–		4	–	5	–	0
Lake Forest		–		3	–	4	–	1
Saint Mary's		–		3	–	4	–	1
Georgetown		–		3	–	5	–	0
Grove City		–		2	–	6	–	1
Cortland		–		1	–	7	–	1
Chicago		–		0	–	6	–	1
^ – NCAA Division III playoff participant

== Conference champions ==
Conference	Champion(s)
College Athletic Conference	Southwestern at Memphis
College Conference of Illinois and Wisconsin	Carthage
Independent College Athletic Conference	Champion unknown
Iowa Intercollegiate Athletic Conference	Buena Vista
Michigan Intercollegiate Athletic Association	Hope
Middle Atlantic Conference	North: Juniata; South: Franklin & Marshall
Midwest Collegiate Athletic Conference	Coe
Minnesota Intercollegiate Athletic Conference	Minnesota–Duluth; St. Thomas (MN)
New England Football Conference	Nichols
New Jersey State Athletic Conference	Montclair State
Southern Intercollegiate Athletic Conference (Division III)	Fisk
Southern California Intercollegiate Athletic Conference	Redlands

== Postseason ==
The 1973 NCAA Division III Football Championship playoffs were the first single-elimination tournament to determine the national champion of men's NCAA Division III college football. The inaugural edition had only four teams (in comparison with the 40 teams competing as of 2024). The championship game was held at Garrett-Harrison Stadium in Phenix City, Alabama. The Wittenberg Tigers defeated the Juniata College Eagles, 41−0, to win their first national title.

=== Playoff bracket ===
Semifinals; Campus sites
Juniata	35
Bridgeport	14
Wittenberg	21
San Diego	14

National Championship Game; Garrett–Harrison Stadium; Phenix City, AL
Juniata	0
Wittenberg	41

== Coaching changes ==
=== In-season ===
This is restricted to coaching changes that took place during the season.

School	Outgoing coach	Reason	Replacement	Previous position
Ripon	John Storzer	Died	Bill Connor (interim, named full-time in December 1973)	Ripon defensive coordinator (1967–1973)

=== End of season ===
This list includes all head coaching changes announced during or after the season.

School	Outgoing coach	Reason	Replacement	Previous position
Bridgeport	Ed Farrell	Hired as head coach for Davidson	Ray Murphy	East Stroudsburg offensive coordinator (1973)
Brockport	Gerry D'Agostino	Resigned	Dave Hutter	Brockport assistant coach (1971–1973)
East Stroudsburg	Charles Reese	Leave of absence	Dennis Douds (full-season interim, hired full-time on January 29, 1975)	East Stroudsburg defensive coordinator (1968–1973)
Elmhurst	Wendell Harris	Resigned	Al Hanke	Lake Forest assistant coach (1954–1973)
Hamline	Dick Mulkern	Resigned (Note: Resigned to devote more time as Hamline's athletic director.)	Jim Sessions	Marietta assistant coach (1973)
Jersey City State	Jack Stephans	Resigned	Bill McKeown	Northeastern offensive coordinator (1972–1973)
Maryville (TN)	Boydson Baird (full-season interim)	Permanent replacement hired	Jim Jordan	Carson–Newman defensive backs coach (1973)
RIT	Tom Coughlin	Hired as quarterbacks coach for Syracuse	Lou Spiotti (Note: Cortland defensive coordinator Dick Wheaton from 1971 to 1973 was originally hired, but resigned after three weeks.)	Rochester defensive backs coach (1972–1973)
Saint Mary's (CA)	Leo McKillip	Hired as defensive coordinator for the Edmonton Eskimos	Jim McDonald	Saint Mary's (CA) offensive line coach (1971–1973)
Saint Peter's	Vinnie Carlesimo	Resigned (Note: Saint Peter's canceled their football season with five games remaining.)	Joe Coviello	North Bergen HS (NJ) (1960–1972)
San Diego	Andy Vinci	Hired as head coach by Cal Poly Pomona	Dick Logan	San Francisco State offensive coordinator (1970–1973)
Simpson	Al Paone	Resigned	Larry Johnson (full-season interim)	Simpson head baseball coach (1970–1974)
Swarthmore	Millard Robinson (full-season interim)	Not retained	Lew Elverson	Swarthmore head coach (1946–1972)
Trenton State	Pete Carmichael	Hired as defensive coordinator for Columbia	Dick Curl (Note: Villanova offensive coordinator Fred O'Connor was initially hired but was replaced by Curl due to backlash from the football players.)	Trenton State offensive coordinator and quarterbacks coach (1973)
Wabash	Dick Bowman	Hired as defensive line coach for Army	Frank Navarro	Columbia head coach (1968–1973)
William Paterson	Phil Zofrea	Resigned	Bob Trocolor	Manchester Regional HS (NJ) freshmen coach (1963)
Wisconsin–Platteville	Gil Krueger	Hired as head coach for Northern Michigan	Bob Seamans	Wisconsin–Platteville defensive coordinator (1969–1973)

== See also ==
- 1973 NCAA Division I football season
- 1973 NCAA Division II football season
- 1973 NAIA Division I football season
- 1973 NAIA Division II football season
