= Tom Shreiner =

American football player (1941–2015)

Biographical details
- Born: 1941; Lancaster, Pennsylvania, U.S.
- Died: December 27, 2015 (aged 73–74); Warrington, Pennsylvania, U.S.

Playing career
- 1959–1962: Gettysburg
- 1963–1964: Harrisburg Capitols

Coaching career (HC unless noted)
- c. 1965: Bermudian Springs HS (PA) (assistant)
- c. 1965: Boiling Springs HS (PA) (line)
- 1966–1969: Susquehanna Township HS (PA)
- 1970–1972: Lehigh (assistant)
- 1973–1975: Delaware Valley

Head coaching record
- Overall: 6–17–1 (college); 16–14–1 (high school)

Thomas Dallas Shreiner (1941 – December 27, 2015) was an American football player and coach. He served as the head football coach at Delaware Valley College from 1973 to 1975, compiling a record of 6–17–1. Shreiner played college football at Gettysburg College in Gettysburg, Pennsylvania.
