= Everett Eischeid =

American football and basketball coach (1912–1979)

Biographical details
- Born: May 6, 1912; Nebraska, U.S.
- Died: November 12, 1979 (aged 67); Minneapolis, Minnesota, U.S.

Playing career

Football
- 1934–1937: Upper Iowa

Coaching career (HC unless noted)

Football
- 1955–1959: Upper Iowa (assistant)
- 1960–1968: Upper Iowa
- 1976: Upper Iowa (interim HC)

Basketball
- 1960–1968: Upper Iowa

Head coaching record
- Overall: 48–36–1 (football); 68–39 (basketball)

Everett Edward "Eb" Eischeid (August 23, 1912 – November 12, 1979) was an American football and basketball coach. He served as the head football coach (1960–1968, 1976) and head basketball coach (1960–1968) at Upper Iowa University in Fayette, Iowa.

Eischeid played college football at Upper Iowa under coach John "Doc" Dorman. His son, Mike Eischeid, played professionally as a punter in the National Football League (NFL).
