= Dick Logan (American football coach) =

American football player and coach

Biographical details
- Born: c. 1940

Playing career
- 1959–1960: San Francisco State
- Position: Center

Coaching career (HC unless noted)
- 1965–1969: Santa Cruz HS (CA)
- 1970–1973: San Francisco State (OC)
- 1974–1976: San Diego

Head coaching record
- Overall: 5–15

Dick Logan (born c. 1940) is an American former football coach. He served as the head football coach at the University of San Diego from 1974 to 1975, compiling a record of 5–15. Logan played college football at San Francisco State University, where he was an All-Far Western Conference center. He was the head football coach at Santa Cruz High School in Santa Cruz, California from 1965 to 1969, before returning to his alma mater, San Francisco State, where he spent four seasons, from 1970 to 1973, as offensive coordinator.

== Head coaching record ==
Year	Team	Overall	Conference	Standing	Bowl/playoffs
San Diego Toreros (NCAA Division III independent) (1974–1975)
1974	San Diego	3–8			
1975	San Diego	2–7			
San Diego:		5–15			
Total:		5–15			
