= Gene Epley =

American football player and coach (1942–2010)

Biographical details
- Born: December 18, 1942; Midland, Pennsylvania, U.S.
- Died: November 21, 2010 (aged 67); Marietta, Ohio, U.S.

Playing career
- 1961–1964: Indiana (PA)

Coaching career (HC unless noted)
- 1965: Sewickley Township HS (PA) (line)
- 1966–1967: Utah State (OL)
- 1968–1971: Utah (DL)
- 1972–1975: Shippensburg
- 1976–1978: Virginia (DC)
- 1979–1982: Army (DC)
- 1983–1985: William & Mary (DC)
- 1986–1990: Hempfield Area HS (PA)
- 1991–2002: Marietta

Head coaching record
- Overall: 63–95–3 (college)

Accomplishments and honors

Awards
- OAC Coach of the Year (1995)

Gene Epley (December 18, 1942 – November 21, 2010) was an American football coach. He served as the head football coach at Shippensburg University of Pennsylvania from 1972 to 1975 and at Marietta College in Marietta, Ohio from 1991 to 2002, compiling a career college football coaching record of 63–95–3.
