= Burt High School =

School in Clarkesville, Tennessee (1923–1970)

Coordinates: 36.5369°N 87.3508°W

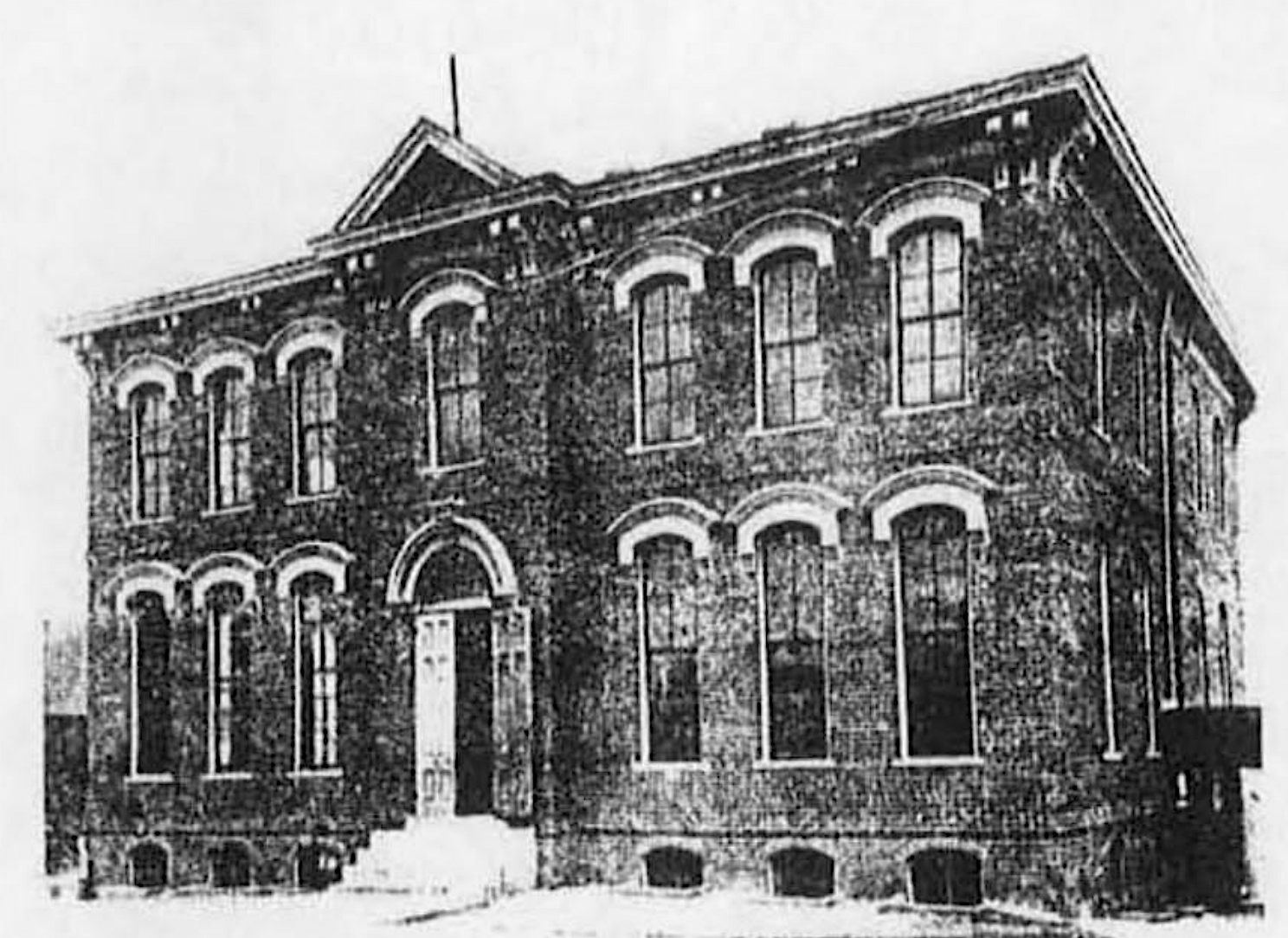
Burt High School (1923–1952) in Clarksville, Tennessee

Burt High School was a public school for black students in Clarksville, Tennessee. Named for Robert Burt, a physician who helped fund it. The school was built in 1922, and opened in 1923, by 1952 the campus was moved and it remained active until its closure in 1970.

== History ==
It was the only high school open to blacks in Montgomery County, Tennessee. Tigers were the school's mascot and black and gold the school colors. The school namesake, Robert Burt was an African American physician who had established a hospital in Clarkesville.

The school received national attention in 1937, after it won first place at the fifth annual Tennessee State University High School Symposium. The school moved next to Austin Peay State University in 1952. It is located at 110 Bailey Street. Burt High School had a band and held an annual pageant.

Three time Olympic gold medalist runner, Wilma Rudolph, who overcame polio as a child, played basketball while enrolled. One of the school basketball coaches was murdered by his landlord in 1955. The school's basketball team won the 1961 National Negro High School Basketball championship.

Burt High School closed in 1970. A historical marker in front of what became the Burt School, an elementary school, commemorates its history. In 2024 the Burt School building was being repurposed.

== Alumni ==
- Wilma Rudolph,three-time Olympic gold medalist sprinter
- L. M. Ellis, State and National Negro High School All-Tournament Team member and Austin Peay Hall of Fame basketball player
