= Gerry D'Agostino =

American football coach

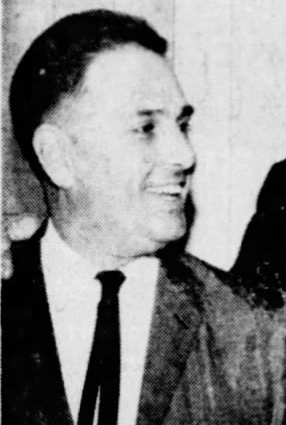
- Gerry D'Agostino in 1964

Biographical details
- Born: March 29, 1924; Port Washington, New York, U.S.
- Died: June 29, 1988 (aged 64); Rochester, New York, U.S.
- Education: Brockport

Coaching career (HC unless noted)
- 1949–1953: Ball HS (TX)
- 1954–1962: Texas City HS (TX)
- 1964–1973: Brockport

Head coaching record
- Overall: 31–48–1 (college)

Gerald Patrick D'Agostino (March 29, 1924 – June 29, 1988) was an American football coach. He served as the head football coach at the State University of New York at Brockport from 1964 to 1973, compiling a record of 31–48–1. D'Agostino died in 1988.

== Head coaching record ==
=== College ===
Year	Team	Overall	Conference	Standing	Bowl/playoffs
Brockport Golden Eagles (NCAA College Division / NCAA Division III independent) (1964–1973)
1964	Brockport	3–5			
1965	Brockport	3–4			
1966	Brockport	1–7			
1967	Brockport	2–6			
1968	Brockport	3–4			
1969	Brockport	2–6			
1970	Brockport	3–5			
1971	Brockport	5–4			
1972	Brockport	4–4–1			
1973	Brockport	5–3			
Brockport:		31–48–1			
Total:		31–48–1			
