= 1980 NCAA Division III football season =

American college football season

- Regular season: August – November 1980
- Playoffs: November – December 1980
- National championship: Garrett-Harrison Stadium; Phenix City, AL
- Champion: Dayton

The 1980 NCAA Division III football season, part of college football in the United States organized by the National Collegiate Athletic Association at the Division III level, began in August 1980, and concluded with the NCAA Division III Football Championship in December 1980 at Garrett-Harrison Stadium in Phenix City, Alabama. The Dayton Flyers won their first Division III championship, defeating the defending national champion Ithaca Bombers by a final score of 63−0.

== Conference changes and new programs ==
- Miles College rejoined the SIAC after not fielding a team in 1979.
- Ramapo College, a club football powerhouse, fielded a varsity team for the first time and joined the NJSAC.
- The University of Lowell (now known as UMass Lowell) also transitioned from being a club team to Division III.

School	1979 Conference	1980 Conference
Illinois College	Independent (NAIA)	CAC
Lowell	Club Program	D-III Independent
Maryville (TN)	D-III Independent	ODAC
Miles	No Program	SIAC
Ramapo College	Club Program	NJSAC

== Conference standings ==
1980 College Athletic Conference football standings
	Conf.					Overall
Team	W		L		T	W		L		T
Centre $	4	–	0	–	1	4	–	4	–	1
Rose–Hulman	4	–	1	–	0	6	–	4	–	0
Sewanee	3	–	2	–	0	4	–	5	–	0
Southwestern (TN)	2	–	2	–	1	5	–	4	–	1
Illinois College	1	–	4	–	0	3	–	6	–	0
Principia	0	–	5	–	0	3	–	6	–	0
$ – Conference champion

1980 College Conference of Illinois and Wisconsin football standings
	Conf.					Overall
Team	W		L		T	W		L		T
Elmhurst +	6	–	2	–	0	7	–	2	–	0
No. 17 Illinois Wesleyan +	6	–	2	–	0	7	–	2	–	0
Augustana (IL)	5	–	3	–	0	6	–	3	–	0
Carthage	5	–	3	–	0	6	–	3	–	0
Millikin	5	–	3	–	0	6	–	3	–	0
North Central (IL)	5	–	3	–	0	6	–	3	–	0
North Park	2	–	6	–	0	3	–	6	–	0
Wheaton (IL)	1	–	7	–	0	2	–	7	–	0
Carroll (WI)	1	–	7	–	0	1	–	8	–	0
+ – Conference co-champions; Rankings from NAIA Division II poll

1980 Independent College Athletic Conference football standings
	Conf.					Overall
Team	W		L		T	W		L		T
Ithaca $^	3	–	0	–	0	12	–	1	–	0
Alfred	2	–	1	–	0	7	–	2	–	1
Hobart	1	–	2	–	1	1	–	7	–	1
RPI	0	–	1	–	1	5	–	3	–	1
St. Lawrence	1	–	3	–	0	5	–	4	–	0
$ – Conference champion; ^ – NCAA Division III playoff participant

1980 Iowa Conference football standings
	Conf.					Overall
Team	W		L		T	W		L		T
Dubuque $^	6	–	1	–	0	8	–	2	–	1
Buena Vista	5	–	2	–	0	6	–	3	–	0
Luther	5	–	2	–	0	6	–	3	–	0
Central (IA)	5	–	2	–	0	5	–	4	–	0
Simpson (IA)	3	–	4	–	0	5	–	4	–	0
Upper Iowa	2	–	5	–	0	3	–	6	–	0
Wartburg	1	–	6	–	0	2	–	7	–	0
William Penn	1	–	6	–	0	3	–	7	–	0
$ – Conference champion; ^ – NCAA Division III playoff participant

1980 Metropolitan Intercollegiate Conference football standings
	Conf.					Overall
Team	W		L		T	W		L		T
Pace $	5	–	0	–	0	6	–	3	–	0
Iona	3	–	1	–	1	6	–	4	–	1
Saint Peter's	3	–	1	–	1	4	–	4	–	1
Marist	2	–	3	–	0	2	–	7	–	0
St. John's	1	–	4	–	0	3	–	7	–	0
Brooklyn	0	–	5	–	0	1	–	9	–	0
$ – Conference champion

1980 Michigan Intercollegiate Athletic Association football standings
	Conf.					Overall
Team	W		L		T	W		L		T
Adrian $	5	–	0	–	0	9	–	0	–	0
Hope	4	–	1	–	0	4	–	5	–	0
Albion	2	–	3	–	0	5	–	4	–	0
Olivet	2	–	3	–	0	2	–	6	–	0
Kalamazoo	1	–	4	–	0	3	–	5	–	0
Alma	1	–	4	–	0	2	–	7	–	0
$ – Conference champion

1980 Middle Atlantic Conference football standings
	Conf.					Overall
Team	W		L		T	W		L		T
Northern Division
Delaware Valley x	7	–	0	–	0	7	–	3	–	0
Lycoming	6	–	1	–	0	9	–	1	–	0
Albright	4	–	3	–	0	5	–	4	–	0
Juniata	4	–	3	–	0	4	–	5	–	0
Wilkes	3	–	4	–	0	3	–	6	–	0
Upsala	2	–	5	–	0	3	–	6	–	1
Susquehanna	2	–	5	–	0	2	–	7	–	0
Fairleigh Dickinson–Florham	0	–	7	–	0	1	–	8	–	0
Southern Division
Widener x^	8	–	0	–	0	11	–	1	–	0
Muhlenberg	7	–	1	–	0	8	–	1	–	0
Franklin & Marshall	6	–	2	–	0	7	–	2	–	0
Western Maryland	5	–	3	–	0	5	–	4	–	0
Gettysburg	4	–	3	–	1	6	–	3	–	1
Moravian	4	–	4	–	0	5	–	4	–	0
Ursinus	3	–	4	–	1	3	–	5	–	1
Swarthmore	3	–	5	–	0	4	–	5	–	0
Dickinson	2	–	5	–	1	2	–	6	–	1
Lebanon Valley	0	–	7	–	1	0	–	8	–	1
Johns Hopkins	0	–	8	–	0	1	–	8	–	0
x – Division champion/co-champions; ^ – NCAA Division III playoff participant

1980 Midwest Conference football standings
	Conf.					Overall
Team	W		L		T	W		L		T
Cornell (IA) +	7	–	1	–	0	8	–	1	–	0
Lawrence +	7	–	1	–	0	8	–	1	–	0
Carleton	6	–	2	–	0	6	–	3	–	0
Coe	4	–	3	–	0	5	–	4	–	0
Ripon	4	–	3	–	0	5	–	4	–	0
Lake Forest	4	–	3	–	1	4	–	3	–	1
Beloit	3	–	4	–	1	4	–	4	–	1
Knox	3	–	5	–	0	3	–	6	–	0
Chicago	1	–	7	–	0	1	–	8	–	0
Grinnell	1	–	7	–	0	1	–	8	–	0
Monmouth (IL)	1	–	7	–	0	1	–	8	–	0
+ – Conference co-champions

1980 Minnesota Intercollegiate Athletic Conference football standings
	Conf.					Overall
Team	W		L		T	W		L		T
Concordia–Moorhead $	7	–	1	–	0	8	–	2	–	0
No.16 Gustavus Adolphus	6	–	2	–	0	7	–	3	–	0
Saint John's (MN)	5	–	3	–	0	5	–	3	–	0
Hamline	5	–	3	–	0	5	–	4	–	0
St. Olaf	4	–	4	–	0	6	–	4	–	0
Augsburg	4	–	4	–	0	5	–	5	–	0
St. Thomas (MN)	2	–	5	–	1	3	–	6	–	1
Bethel (MN)	2	–	6	–	0	2	–	8	–	0
Macalester	0	–	7	–	1	1	–	7	–	1
$ – Conference champion; Rankings from NAIA Division II poll

1980 New Jersey State Athletic Conference football standings
	Conf.					Overall
Team	W		L		T	W		L		T
Trenton State $	6	–	0	–	0	8	–	1	–	1
Montclair State	5	–	1	–	0	8	–	2	–	0
Glassboro State	4	–	2	–	0	4	–	6	–	0
Ramapo	2	–	4	–	0	5	–	5	–	0
William Paterson	2	–	4	–	0	5	–	5	–	0
Kean	2	–	4	–	0	4	–	5	–	0
Jersey City State	0	–	6	–	0	2	–	8	–	0
$ – Conference champion

1980 New England Football Conference standings
	Conf.					Overall
Team	W		L		T	W		L		T
Maine Maritime $	8	–	1	–	0	8	–	1	–	0
New Haven	6	–	2	–	1	6	–	3	–	1
Massachusetts Maritime	6	–	3	–	0	6	–	3	–	0
Plymouth State	5	–	3	–	1	6	–	3	–	1
Bridgewater State	5	–	3	–	1	5	–	3	–	1
Boston State	5	–	4	–	0	5	–	4	–	0
Framingham State	4	–	5	–	0	4	–	5	–	0
Nichols	3	–	5	–	1	3	–	5	–	1
Curry	0	–	8	–	1	0	–	8	–	1
Western Connecticut State	0	–	8	–	1	0	–	8	–	1
$ – Conference champion

1980 New England Small College Athletic Conference football standings
	Conf.					Overall
Team	W		L		T	W		L		T
Trinity (CT)	5	–	1	–	0	7	–	1	–	0
Tufts	6	–	2	–	0	6	–	2	–	0
Middlebury	4	–	1	–	1	6	–	1	–	1
Williams	3	–	2	–	1	5	–	2	–	1
Wesleyan	4	–	3	–	0	5	–	3	–	0
Bowdoin	3	–	3	–	0	5	–	3	–	0
Bates	3	–	4	–	0	3	–	5	–	0
Amherst	2	–	6	–	0	2	–	6	–	0
Colby	1	–	5	–	0	1	–	7	–	0
Hamilton	0	–	6	–	0	2	–	6	–	0
The NESCAC did not recognize an official conference champion until 2000

1980 Northern Intercollegiate Conference football standings
	Conf.					Overall
Team	W		L		T	W		L		T
Minnesota Duluth $	8	–	0	–	0	10	–	0	–	0
Minnesota Morris ^	7	–	1	–	0	9	–	2	–	1
No. 11 Moorhead State	6	–	2	–	0	8	–	2	–	0
St. Cloud State	5	–	3	–	0	6	–	4	–	0
Mankato State	3	–	5	–	0	3	–	7	–	0
Southwest State (MN)	2	–	5	–	1	3	–	6	–	1
Winona State	2	–	6	–	0	3	–	7	–	0
Northern State	1	–	6	–	1	2	–	7	–	1
Bemidji State	1	–	7	–	0	1	–	9	–	0
$ – Conference champion; ^ – NCAA Division III playoff participant; Rankings from NAIA Division I poll

1980 Ohio Athletic Conference football standings
	Conf.					Overall
Team	W		L		T	W		L		T
Blue Division
Wittenberg xy	6	–	0	–	0	8	–	2	–	0
Ohio Northern	4	–	2	–	0	6	–	2	–	1
Capital	4	–	2	–	0	6	–	3	–	0
Wooster	3	–	2	–	1	6	–	2	–	1
Denison	2	–	3	–	1	4	–	4	–	1
Ohio Wesleyan	1	–	5	–	0	2	–	6	–	1
Muskingum	0	–	6	–	0	1	–	8	–	0
Red Division
Baldwin–Wallace xy$^	5	–	0	–	0	10	–	1	–	0
Mount Union	4	–	1	–	0	5	–	4	–	0
Otterbein	2	–	3	–	0	5	–	4	–	0
Heidelberg	2	–	3	–	0	3	–	6	–	0
Kenyon	1	–	4	–	0	3	–	6	–	0
Marietta	1	–	4	–	0	1	–	7	–	1
Not competing for championship
Oberlin			–			1	–	8	–	0
Championship: Baldwin–Wallace 16, Wittenberg 0
$ – Conference champion; x – Division champion/co-champions; y – Championship game participant; ^ – NCAA Division III playoff participant

1980 Old Dominion Athletic Conference football standings
	Conf.					Overall
Team	W		L		T	W		L		T
Bridgewater $	4	–	1	–	0	6	–	3	–	0
Maryville (TN)	3	–	2	–	0	5	–	5	–	0
Randolph–Macon	3	–	2	–	0	4	–	5	–	0
Washington and Lee	2	–	3	–	0	6	–	4	–	0
Hampden–Sydney	2	–	3	–	0	3	–	7	–	0
Emory & Henry	1	–	4	–	0	2	–	8	–	0
$ – Conference champion

1980 Presidents' Athletic Conference football standings
	Conf.					Overall
Team	W		L		T	W		L		T
Bethany (WV) $^	7	–	0	–	0	9	–	1	–	0
Carnegie Mellon	6	–	1	–	0	8	–	1	–	0
John Carroll	4	–	3	–	0	4	–	5	–	0
Thiel	4	–	3	–	0	4	–	5	–	0
Allegheny	3	–	3	–	1	3	–	4	–	1
Hiram	2	–	4	–	1	2	–	6	–	1
Washington & Jefferson	1	–	6	–	0	2	–	7	–	0
Case Western Reserve	0	–	7	–	0	0	–	9	–	0
$ – Conference champion; ^ – NCAA Division III playoff participant

1980 Southern California Intercollegiate Athletic Conference football standings
	Conf.					Overall
Team	W		L		T	W		L		T
Redlands $	5	–	0	–	0	6	–	4	–	0
Claremont-Mudd	4	–	1	–	0	6	–	3	–	0
Whittier	3	–	2	–	0	5	–	5	–	0
Occidental	2	–	3	–	0	4	–	6	–	0
La Verne	1	–	4	–	0	2	–	8	–	0
Pomona-Pitzer	0	–	5	–	0	0	–	9	–	0
$ – Conference champion

1980 Southern Intercollegiate Athletic Conference football standings
	Conf.					Overall
Team	W		L		T	W		L		T
Division II
Morris Brown*	5	–	0	–	1	6	–	3	–	1
Alabama A&M x	3	–	1	–	1	5	–	4	–	1
Tuskegee	4	–	1	–	0	4	–	6	–	0
Albany State	4	–	3	–	0	4	–	7	–	0
Morehouse	2	–	7	–	0	2	–	7	–	0
Division III
Fort Valley State x	5	–	4	–	1	6	–	4	–	1
Savannah State	4	–	3	–	0	6	–	4	–	0
Miles	2	–	3	–	1	4	–	4	–	2
Knoxville	3	–	4	–	0	4	–	5	–	0
Clark	3	–	2	–	0	3	–	4	–	0
Lane	3	–	3	–	0	3	–	5	–	0
Fisk	0	–	7	–	0	0	–	8	–	0
x – Division champion/co-champions; * – Morris Brown was stripped of their division title for using ineligible players. Alabama A&M is recognized as the Division II champion by the SIAC

1980 Wisconsin State University Conference football standings
	Conf.					Overall
Team	W		L		T	W		L		T
No. 14 Wisconsin–La Crosse +	6	–	2	–	0	8	–	2	–	0
No. 13 Wisconsin–River Falls +	6	–	2	–	0	8	–	2	–	0
Wisconsin–Whitewater +	6	–	2	–	0	8	–	3	–	0
Wisconsin–Platteville +	6	–	2	–	0	7	–	3	–	0
Wisconsin–Stout	5	–	3	–	0	6	–	4	–	0
Wisconsin–Oshkosh	3	–	5	–	0	4	–	6	–	0
Wisconsin–Stevens Point	2	–	6	–	0	4	–	6	–	0
Wisconsin–Eau Claire	2	–	6	–	0	3	–	8	–	0
Wisconsin–Superior	0	–	8	–	0	0	–	10	–	0
+ – Conference co-champions; Rankings from NAIA Division I poll

1980 NCAA Division III independents football records
	Conf.			Overall
Team	W	L	T	W		L		T
Dayton ^		–		14	–	0	–	0
Millsaps		–		9	–	0	–	0
Wabash		–		8	–	0	–	1
Illinois College		–		8	–	1	–	0
Hofstra		–		8	–	2	–	0
Wagner ^		–		8	–	2	–	0
DePauw		–		7	–	2	–	1
Salisbury State		–		7	–	3	–	1
Catholic University		–		6	–	3	–	0
WPI		–		5	–	3	–	0
Canisius		–		5	–	4	–	0
Brockport		–		5	–	4	–	1
Buffalo		–		6	–	5	–	0
Albany		–		5	–	5	–	0
Bishop		–		5	–	5	–	0
Georgetown		–		4	–	4	–	0
San Diego		–		5	–	5	–	0
UCF		–		4	–	4	–	1
Saint Mary's		–		5	–	6	–	0
Duquesne		–		4	–	5	–	0
Frostburg State		–		4	–	5	–	0
Grove City		–		4	–	5	–	0
Norwich		–		4	–	6	–	0
Rochester (NY)		–		3	–	5	–	1
St. Norbert		–		3	–	6	–	0
Cortland		–		3	–	7	–	0
Lowell		–		2	–	6	–	1
Colorado College		–		2	–	7	–	0
Saint Francis (PA)		–		2	–	7	–	0
Washington (MO)		–		2	–	7	–	0
Union (NY)		–		1	–	7	–	0
Fordham		–		0	–	9	–	0
Merchant Marine		–		0	–	11	–	0
^ – NCAA Division III playoff participant

== Conference champions ==
Conference champions
- College Athletic Conference – Centre
- College Conference of Illinois and Wisconsin – Elmhurst and Illinois Wesleyan
- Independent College Athletic Conference – Ithaca
- Iowa Intercollegiate Athletic Conference – Dubuque
- Michigan Intercollegiate Athletic Association – Adrian
- Middle Atlantic Conference – Delaware Valley (North), Widener (South)
- Midwest Collegiate Athletic Conference – Cornell College and Lawrence
- Minnesota Intercollegiate Athletic Conference – Concordia–Moorhead
- New England Football Conference – Maine Maritime
- New Jersey State Athletic Conference – Trenton State
- Northwest Conference – Linfield
- Ohio Athletic Conference – Baldwin Wallace (Red Division), Wittenberg (Blue Division)
- Old Dominion Athletic Conference – Bridgewater
- Presidents' Athletic Conference – Bethany (WV)
- Southern California Intercollegiate Athletic Conference – Redlands
- Southern Intercollegiate Athletic Conference - Fort Valley State
- Texas Intercollegiate Athletic Association – McMurry
- Twin Rivers Conference – Mount Senario
- Wisconsin Intercollegiate Athletic Conference – Wisconsin–La Crosse, Wisconsin–Platteville, Wisconsin–River Falls, and Wisconsin–Whitewater

== Final Regular Season AP Poll ==
Rank	Team	Record	Points
1	Ithaca	10-0-0	60
2	Widener	10-0-0	56
3	Dayton	11-0-0	52
4	Baldwin-Wallace	10-0-0	48
5	Minnesota-Morris	8-1-1	44
6	Dubuque	8-1-1	39
7	Wagner	8-1-0	35
8	Bethany	9-0-0	30
8(tie)	Wabash	8-0-1	30
10	Adrian	9-0-0	25

== Postseason ==
The 1980 NCAA Division III Football Championship playoffs were the eighth annual single-elimination tournament to determine the national champion of men's NCAA Division III college football. The championship game was held at Garrett-Harrison Stadium in Phenix City, Alabama for the eighth consecutive year. Like the previous five championships, eight teams competed in this edition.

=== Playoff bracket ===
Quarterfinals; Campus Sites
Ithaca	41
Wagner	13
Minnesota–Morris	41
Dubuque	35
Dayton	34
Baldwin Wallace	0
Widener	43
Bethany (WV)	12

Semifinals; Campus Sites
Ithaca	36
Minnesota–Morris	0
Dayton	28
Widener	24

National Championship Game; Garrett-Harrison Stadium; Phenix City, AL
Ithaca	0
Dayton	63

== See also ==
- 1980 NCAA Division I-A football season
- 1980 NCAA Division I-AA football season
- 1980 NCAA Division II football season
- 1980 NAIA Division I football season
- 1980 NAIA Division II football season
