= List of Buffalo Bulls football seasons =

This is a list of seasons completed by the Buffalo Bulls football team of the National Collegiate Athletic Association (NCAA) Division I Football Bowl Subdivision (FBS). Buffalo's first football team was fielded in 1894.

Buffalo originally competed as a football independent. Following the 1970 season, Buffalo's football team was discontinued for six seasons, before being reinstated as a Division III team in 1977. Buffalo competed as a I-AA team for six seasons before joining the I-A's Mid-American Conference in 1999, of which it has been a member since.

== Seasons ==
Statistics correct as of the end of the 2025–26 college football season

NCAA Division I champions	Conference champions	Division champions	Bowl Eligible	Undefeated Season

Year	NCAA Division	Conference	Conference Division	Overall					Conference					Coach	Final Ranking	
Year	NCAA Division	Conference	Conference Division	Games	Win	Loss	Tie	Pct.	Games	Win	Loss	Pct.	Standing	Coach	AP	Coaches'
1894	N/A	Independent	N/A	2	0	1	1	.250	N/A					No Coach	-	-
1895	N/A	Independent	N/A	2	0	1	1	.250	N/A					No Coach	-	-
1896	N/A	Independent	N/A	3	1	0	2	.667	N/A					Fred D. Townsend	-	-
1897	N/A	Independent	N/A	7	7	0	0	1.000	N/A					C.W. Dibble	-	-
1898	N/A	Independent	N/A	5	4	1	0	.800	N/A					No Coach	-	-
1899	N/A	Independent	N/A	8	7	1	0	.875	N/A					Bemus Pierce	-	-
1900	N/A	Independent	N/A	4	1	1	2	.500	N/A					No Coach	-	-
1901	N/A	Independent	N/A	6	4	2	0	.667	N/A					James B. “Turk” Gordon	-	-
1902	N/A	Independent	N/A	7	2	4	1	.357	N/A					No Coach	-	-
1903	N/A	Independent	N/A	6	3	3	0	.500	N/A					Ray Turnbull	-	-
1904	No team															
1905	No team															
1906	No team															
1907	No team															
1908	No team															
1909	No team															
1910	No team															
1911	No team															
1912	No team															
1913	No team															
1914	No team															
1915	N/A	Independent	N/A	7	3	4	0	.429	N/A					Frank Mt. Pleasant	-	-
1916	N/A	Independent	N/A	10	3	5	2	.400	N/A					Art Powell	-	-
1917	N/A	Independent	N/A	8	4	4	0	.500	N/A					Art Powell	-	-
1918	N/A	Independent	N/A	4	3	1	0	.750	N/A					Art Powell	-	-
1919	N/A	Independent	N/A	6	0	5	1	.083	N/A					Art Powell	-	-
1920	N/A	Independent	N/A	5	1	4	0	.200	N/A					Art Powell	-	-
1921	N/A	Independent	N/A	7	2	3	2	.429	N/A					Art Powell	-	-
1922	N/A	Independent	N/A	6	1	5	0	.167	N/A					George "Dim" Batterson	-	-
1923	N/A	Independent	N/A	8	2	5	1	.313	N/A					James Bond	-	-
1924	N/A	Independent	N/A	8	1	7	0	.125	N/A					Russ Carrick	-	-
1925	N/A	Independent	N/A	8	3	4	1	.438	N/A					Russ Carrick	-	-
1926	N/A	New York State Conference	N/A	7	0	7	0	.000	N/A					Russ Carrick	-	-
1927	N/A	New York State Conference	N/A	7	0	6	1	.071	N/A					Russ Carrick	-	-
1928	N/A	New York State Conference	N/A	7	1	6	0	.143	N/A					Russ Carrick	-	-
1929	N/A	New York State Conference	N/A	7	5	2	0	.714	N/A					Jay "Biffy" Lee	-	-
1930	N/A	New York State Conference	N/A	8	3	5	0	.375	N/A					Jay "Biffy" Lee	-	-
1931	N/A	New York State Conference	N/A	8	2	6	0	.250	N/A					Bill Pritchard	-	-
1932	N/A	New York State Conference	N/A	7	1	5	1	.214	N/A					Jim Wilson	-	-
1933	N/A	New York State Conference	N/A	7	2	3	2	.429	N/A					Jim Wilson	-	-
1934	N/A	New York State Conference	N/A	7	2	4	1	.357	N/A					George Van Bibber	-	-
1935	N/A	Independent	N/A	8	2	6	0	.250	N/A					George Van Bibber	-	-
1936	N/A	Independent	N/A	8	5	3	0	.625	N/A					Jim Peelle	-	-
1937	N/A	Independent	N/A	8	4	4	0	.500	N/A					Jim Peelle	-	-
1938	N/A	Independent	N/A	8	2	6	0	.250	N/A					Jim Peelle	-	-
1939	N/A	Independent	N/A	7	0	7	0	.000	N/A					Jim Peelle	-	-
1940	N/A	Independent	N/A	8	3	5	0	.375	N/A					Jim Peelle	-	-
1941	N/A	Independent	N/A	8	3	4	1	.438	N/A					Jim Peelle	-	-
1942	N/A	Independent	N/A	8	6	2	0	.750	N/A					Jim Peelle	-	-
1943	No team due to World War II															
1944	No team due to World War II															
1945	No team due to World War II															
1946	N/A	Independent	N/A	9	7	2	0	.778	N/A					Jim Peelle	-	-
1947	N/A	Independent	N/A	9	8	1	0	.889	N/A					Jim Peelle	-	-
1948	N/A	Independent	N/A	8	6	1	1	.813	N/A					Frank Clair	-	-
1949	N/A	Independent	N/A	9	6	3	0	.667	N/A					Frank Clair	-	-
1950	N/A	Independent	N/A	8	5	3	0	.625	N/A					Jim Wilson	-	-
1951	N/A	Independent	N/A	8	4	4	0	.500	N/A					Jim Wilson	-	-
1952	N/A	Independent	N/A	8	1	7	0	.125	N/A					Friedrich "Fritz" Febel	-	-
1953	N/A	Independent	N/A	7	1	5	1	.214	N/A					Friedrich "Fritz" Febel	-	-
1954	N/A	Independent	N/A	9	2	7	0	.222	N/A					Friedrich "Fritz" Febel	-	-
1955	N/A	Independent	N/A	9	4	4	1	.500	N/A					Dick Offenhamer	-	-
1956	College	Independent	N/A	8	5	3	0	.625	N/A					Dick Offenhamer	-	-
1957	College	Independent	N/A	9	5	4	0	.556	N/A					Dick Offenhamer	-	-
1958	College	Independent	N/A	9	8	1	0	.889	N/A					Dick Offenhamer	-	-
1959	College	Independent	N/A	9	8	1	0	.889	N/A					Dick Offenhamer	-	-
1960	College	Independent	N/A	10	4	6	0	.400	N/A					Dick Offenhamer	-	-
1961	College	Independent	N/A	9	4	5	0	.444	N/A					Dick Offenhamer	-	-
1962	University	Independent	N/A	9	6	3	0	.667	N/A					Dick Offenhamer	-	-
1963	University	Independent	N/A	9	5	3	1	.611	N/A					Dick Offenhamer	-	-
1964	University	Independent	N/A	9	4	4	1	.500	N/A					Dick Offenhamer	-	-
1965	University	Independent	N/A	10	5	3	2	.600	N/A					Dick Offenhamer	-	-
1966	University	Independent	N/A	10	5	5	0	.500	N/A					Richard "Doc" Urich	-	-
1967	University	Independent	N/A	10	6	4	0	.600	N/A					Richard "Doc" Urich	-	-
1968	University	Independent	N/A	10	7	3	0	.700	N/A					Richard "Doc" Urich	-	-
1969	University	Independent	N/A	9	6	3	0	.667	N/A					Bob Deming	-	-
1970	University	Independent	N/A	11	2	9	0	.182	N/A					Bob Deming	-	-
1971	No team															
1972	No team															
1973	No team															
1974	No team															
1975	No team															
1976	No team															
1977	III	Division III Independent	N/A	4	0	3	1	.125	N/A					Bill Dando	-	-
1978	III	Division III Independent	N/A	9	3	6	0	.333	N/A					Bill Dando	-	-
1979	III	Division III Independent	N/A	9	4	5	0	.444	N/A					Bill Dando	-	-
1980	III	Division III Independent	N/A	11	6	5	0	.545	N/A					Bill Dando	-	-
1981	III	Division III Independent	N/A	10	5	5	0	.500	N/A					Bill Dando	-	-
1982	III	Division III Independent	N/A	10	5	5	0	.500	N/A					Bill Dando	-	-
1983	III	Division III Independent	N/A	10	8	2	0	.800	N/A					Bill Dando	-	-
1984	III	Division III Independent	N/A	10	6	4	0	.600	N/A					Bill Dando	-	-
1985	III	Division III Independent	N/A	10	4	6	0	.400	N/A					Bill Dando	-	-
1986	III	Division III Independent	N/A	11	9	2	0	.818	N/A					Bill Dando	-	-
1987	III	Division III Independent	N/A	10	3	7	0	.300	N/A					Bill Dando	-	-
1988	III	Division III Independent	N/A	10	2	8	0	.200	N/A					Bill Dando	-	-
1989	III	Division III Independent	N/A	10	4	6	0	.400	N/A					Bill Dando	-	-
1990	III	Division III Independent	N/A	10	2	8	0	.200	N/A					Sam Sanders	-	-
1991	III	Division III Independent	N/A	10	3	7	0	.300	N/A					Sam Sanders	-	-
1992	III	Division III Independent	N/A	10	4	6	0	.400	N/A					Jim Ward	-	-
1993	I-AA	Division I-AA Independent	N/A	11	1	10	0	.091	N/A					Jim Ward	-	-
1994	I-AA	Division I-AA Independent	N/A	11	3	8	0	.273	N/A					Jim Ward	-	-
1995	I-AA	Division I-AA Independent	N/A	11	3	8	0	.273	N/A					Craig Cirbus	-	-
1996	I-AA	Division I-AA Independent	N/A	11	8	3	0	.727	N/A					Craig Cirbus	-	-
1997	I-AA	Division I-AA Independent	N/A	11	2	9	0	.182	N/A					Craig Cirbus	-	-
1998	I-AA	Division I-AA Independent	N/A	11	4	7	0	.364	N/A					Craig Cirbus	-	-
1999	I-A	MAC	East	11	0	11	0	.000	8	0	8	.000	7th (East)	Craig Cirbus	-	-
2000	I-A	MAC	East	11	2	9	0	.182	8	2	6	.250	T-5th (East)	Craig Cirbus	-	-
2001	I-A	MAC	East	11	3	8	0	.273	8	1	7	.125	T-6th (East)	Jim Hofher	-	-
2002	I-A	MAC	East	12	1	11	0	.083	8	0	8	.000	7th (East)	Jim Hofher	-	-
2003	I-A	MAC	East	12	1	11	0	.083	8	1	7	.125	T-6th (East)	Jim Hofher	-	-
2004	I-A	MAC	East	11	2	9	0	.182	8	2	6	.250	T-5th (East)	Jim Hofher	-	-
2005	I-A	MAC	East	11	1	10	0	.091	8	1	7	.125	5th (East)	Jim Hofher	-	-
2006	FBS	MAC	East	12	2	10	0	.167	8	1	7	.125	6th (East)	Turner Gill	-	-
2007	FBS	MAC	East	12	5	7	0	.417	8	5	3	.625	T-1st (East)	Turner Gill	-	-
2008	FBS	MAC	East	14	8	6	0	.571	8	5	3	.625	1st (East)	Turner Gill	-	-
2009	FBS	MAC	East	12	5	7	0	.417	8	3	5	.375	5th (East)	Turner Gill	-	-
2010	FBS	MAC	East	12	2	10	0	.167	8	1	7	.125	T-5th (East)	Jeff Quinn	-	-
2011	FBS	MAC	East	12	3	9	0	.250	8	2	6	.250	6th (East)	Jeff Quinn	-	-
2012	FBS	MAC	East	12	4	8	0	.333	8	3	5	.375	T-4th (East)	Jeff Quinn	-	-
2013	FBS	MAC	East	13	8	5	0	.615	8	6	2	.750	2nd (East)	Jeff Quinn	-	-
2014	FBS	MAC	East	11	5	6	0	.455	7	3	4	.429	3rd (East)	Jeff Quinn	-	-
2015	FBS	MAC	East	12	5	7	0	.417	8	3	5	.375	4th (East)	Lance Leipold	-	-
2016	FBS	MAC	East	12	2	10	0	.167	8	1	7	.125	6th (East)	Lance Leipold	-	-
2017	FBS	MAC	East	12	6	6	0	.500	8	4	4	.500	T-3rd (East)	Lance Leipold	-	-
2018	FBS	MAC	East	14	10	4	0	.714	8	7	1	.875	1st (East)	Lance Leipold	-	-
2019	FBS	MAC	East	13	8	5	0	.615	8	5	3	.625	T-2nd (East)	Lance Leipold	-	-
2020	FBS	MAC	East	7	6	1	0	.857	5	5	0	1.00	1st (East)	Lance Leipold	25	
2021	FBS	MAC	East	12	4	8	0	.333	8	2	6	.250	T-4th (East)	Maurice Linguist	-	-
2022	FBS	MAC	East	13	7	6	0	.538	8	5	3	.625	T-2nd (East)	Maurice Linguist	-	-
2023	FBS	MAC	East	12	3	9	0	.250	8	3	5	.375	T-4th (East)	Maurice Linguist	-	-
2024	FBS	MAC	N/A	13	9	4	0	.692	8	6	2	.750	T-3rd	Pete Lembo	-	-
2025	FBS	MAC	N/A	12	5	7	0	.417	8	4	4	.500	T-6th	Pete Lembo	-	-
	Totals			976	412	555	28	.428	188	66	122	.351				
