= 1979 Buffalo Bulls football team =

American college football season

1979 Buffalo Bulls football
- Conference: Independent
- Record: 4–5
- Head coach: Bill Dando (3rd season)
- Captains: James Rodriguez; Shane Currey
- Home stadium: Rotary Field

1979 NCAA Division III independents football records
	Conf.			Overall
Team	W	L	T	W		L		T
Wabash		–		8	–	1	–	0
Norwich		–		8	–	2	–	0
Maryville (TN)		–		7	–	2	–	0
Dayton		–		8	–	2	–	1
UCF		–		6	–	2	–	0
Millsaps		–		7	–	3	–	0
Albany		–		6	–	3	–	0
Catholic University		–		6	–	3	–	0
Salisbury State		–		6	–	3	–	0
Georgetown		–		5	–	3	–	0
Hofstra		–		5	–	3	–	1
Frostburg State		–		6	–	4	–	0
Saint Mary's		–		6	–	4	–	0
Brockport		–		5	–	4	–	0
Canisius		–		5	–	4	–	0
Duquesne		–		5	–	4	–	0
Rochester (NY)		–		5	–	4	–	0
Wagner		–		5	–	5	–	0
San Diego		–		5	–	6	–	0
Buffalo		–		4	–	5	–	0
Colorado College		–		4	–	5	–	0
Union (NY)		–		3	–	5	–	0
WPI		–		3	–	5	–	0
Grove City		–		3	–	6	–	0
Saint Francis (PA)		–		2	–	6	–	0
DePauw		–		2	–	7	–	0
Merchant Marine		–		1	–	9	–	1
Cortland		–		1	–	9	–	0
St. Norbert		–		1	–	9	–	0
Fordham		–		0	–	9	–	0

The 1979 Buffalo Bulls football team represented the University at Buffalo as an independent during the 1979 NCAA Division III football season. Led by Bill Dando in his third season as head coach, the team compiled a record of 4–5.

== Schedule ==
Date	Opponent	Site	Result	Attendance
September 8	Cortland	Rotary Field; Buffalo, NY	W 17–13	6,364
September 15	at John Carroll	Cleveland, OH	W 9–3	1,200
September 22	at Brockport	Brockport, NY	L 25–32	2,200
September 29	Waynesburg	Rotary Field; Buffalo, NY	W 29–28	3,228
October 6	Canisius	Rotary Field; Buffalo, NY	L 18–21	6,743
October 13	at Albany	Albany, NY	L 13–40	3,047
October 20	at Westminster (PA)	New Wilmington, PA	L 0–24	4,700
October 27	St. Lawrence	Rotary Field; Buffalo, NY	W 3–0	1,693
November 10	at Alfred	Alfred Field; Alfred, NY	L 3–16	2,500
