= Samford Bulldogs football, 1984–1989 =

American college football seasons

Samford Bulldogs football, 1984–1989 encompassed all of the seasons of college football played at Samford University as a participant in NCAA Division III as an independent through their transition to Division I-AA as an independent. During the entirety of this period, Samford played their home games at Seibert Stadium in Homewood, Alabama.

In February 1974, the Board of Trustees voted to eliminate the program after 68 years of competition. The decision was made at the time due to the rising costs of running an intercollegiate football program that was compounded with dwindling fan support. In March 1984, University President Thomas E. Corts announced Samford would revive the football program for their 1984 season and competed as a Division III independent.

In April 1984, Kim Alsop was introduced as head coach for the Bulldogs. He remained as head coach for three seasons and led the Bulldogs to an overall record of 6 wins and 20 losses. In January 1987, Terry Bowden was hired as head coach at Samford, and he remained in the position through their 1992 season. He successfully led the Bulldogs through their transition from Division III to Division I-AA by the 1989 season.

== 1984 ==
1984 Samford Bulldogs football
- Conference: Independent
- Record: 1–7
- Head coach: Kim Alsop (1st season)
- Home stadium: Seibert Stadium

1984 NCAA Division III independents football records
	Conf.			Overall
Team	W	L	T	W		L		T
Dayton ^		–		10	–	1	–	0
Hofstra		–		9	–	1	–	0
Mercyhurst		–		8	–	1	–	0
Millsaps		–		8	–	1	–	0
Norwich		–		9	–	2	–	0
Union (NY) ^		–		9	–	2	–	0
Wabash		–		8	–	2	–	0
Merchant Marine		–		7	–	2	–	1
Salisbury State		–		6	–	3	–	0
Frostburg State		–		6	–	3	–	1
Buffalo		–		6	–	4	–	0
DePauw		–		6	–	4	–	0
Wagner		–		6	–	4	–	0
Buffalo State		–		5	–	4	–	0
Catholic University		–		5	–	4	–	0
Albany		–		5	–	5	–	0
Fordham		–		5	–	5	–	0
Fairleigh Dickinson–Florham		–		4	–	5	–	0
Stony Brook		–		4	–	5	–	0
Cortland		–		4	–	6	–	0
Duquesne		–		3	–	5	–	0
Canisius		–		2	–	8	–	0
Iona		–		2	–	8	–	0
San Diego		–		1	–	8	–	1
Georgetown		–		1	–	6	–	0
Saint Francis (PA)		–		1	–	7	–	0
Samford		–		1	–	7	–	0
Brockport		–		1	–	8	–	0
Colorado College		–		1	–	8	–	0
Rochester (NY)		–		1	–	8	–	0
Lebanon Valley		–		1	–	9	–	0
^ – NCAA Division III playoff participant

The 1984 Samford Bulldogs football team was an American football team that represented Samford University as an independent during the 1984 NCAA Division III football season. Led by first-year head coach Kim Alsop, the team compiled a 1–7 record.

This marked the return of football at Samford since the discontinuation of the program after their 1973 season. On April 26, University President Thomas E. Corts introduced Alsop as the head coach for the revived Samford program. Alsop came to Samford from Northside Christian High School in St. Petersburg, Florida where he served as head coach. Samfords win against Sewanee was their first since they defeated Mars Hill on November 3, 1973.

=== Schedule ===
Date	Opponent	Site	Result	Attendance	Source
September 1	Salem (WV)	Seibert Stadium; Homewood, AL	L 9–82	8,610	
September 8	at Hampden–Sydney	Hundley Stadium; Hampden Sydney, VA	L 6–35		
September 15	at West Georgia	Grisham Stadium; Carrollton, GA	L 6–41		
September 29	at Georgia Southwestern State	Finklea-Robinson Stadium; Americus, GA	L 0–45		
October 13	Arkansas–Monticello	Seibert Stadium; Homewood, AL	L 24–45		
October 20	Georgia Southwestern State^{†}	Seibert Stadium; Homewood, AL	L 14–45		
November 3	at Washington and Lee	Wilson Field; Lexington, VA	L 28–49		
November 10	Sewanee	Seibert Stadium; Homewood, AL	W 38–33		
^{†}Homecoming

== 1985 ==
1985 Samford Bulldogs football
- Conference: Independent
- Record: 2–8
- Head coach: Kim Alsop (2nd season)
- Home stadium: Seibert Stadium

1985 NCAA Division III independents football records
	Conf.			Overall
Team	W	L	T	W		L		T
Villanova		–		5	–	0	–	0
Worcester State		–		5	–	0	–	0
Union (NY) ^		–		9	–	1	–	0
Millsaps		–		7	–	1	–	1
Salisbury State ^		–		10	–	2	–	0
Albany		–		9	–	2	–	0
Wagner		–		9	–	2	–	0
DePauw		–		8	–	2	–	0
Mercyhurst		–		8	–	2	–	0
Wabash		–		7	–	2	–	1
Canisius		–		6	–	2	–	1
Dayton		–		7	–	3	–	0
Marist		–		5	–	3	–	0
Frostburg State		–		6	–	4	–	0
Stony Brook		–		6	–	4	–	0
Fairleigh Dickinson–Florham		–		5	–	4	–	0
Georgetown		–		5	–	4	–	0
Ferrum		–		6	–	5	–	0
Norwich		–		5	–	5	–	0
Cortland		–		4	–	5	–	0
Buffalo		–		4	–	6	–	0
Hofstra		–		4	–	6	–	0
San Diego		–		3	–	5	–	0
Duquesne		–		3	–	6	–	0
MacMurray		–		2	–	4	–	0
Saint Peter's		–		2	–	5	–	0
Brooklyn		–		2	–	6	–	0
Buffalo State		–		2	–	7	–	0
Rochester (NY)		–		2	–	7	–	0
Samford		–		2	–	8	–	0
Catholic University		–		2	–	9	–	0
Brockport		–		1	–	9	–	1
Colorado College		–		1	–	8	–	0
Saint Francis (PA)		–		0	–	9	–	0
^ – NCAA Division III playoff participant

The 1985 Samford Bulldogs football team was an American football team that represented Samford University as an independent during the 1985 NCAA Division III football season. Led by second-year head coach Kim Alsop, the team compiled a 2–8 record.

=== Schedule ===
Date	Opponent	Site	Result	Attendance	Source
September 7	at Sewanee	McGee Field; Sewanee, TN	L 10–28		
September 14	Hampden–Sydney	Seibert Stadium; Homewood, AL	L 14–27		
September 21	at Arkansas–Monticello	Cotton Boll Stadium; Monticello, AR	L 16–35		
September 28	at Emory and Henry	Fullerton Field; Emory, VA	L 32–48		
October 5	Rhodes	Seibert Stadium; Homewood, AL	L 9–19		
October 12	Dayton	Seibert Stadium; Homewood, AL	L 13–63		
October 19	Millsaps	Seibert Stadium; Homewood, AL	L 7–35		
November 9	at Maryville	Honaker Field; Maryville, TN	W 35–29		
November 16	Loras	Seibert Stadium; Homewood, AL	W 23–7		
November 30	at UCF	Florida Citrus Bowl; Orlando, FL	L 14–35	3,022	

== 1986 ==
1986 Samford Bulldogs football
- Conference: Independent
- Record: 3–6
- Head coach: Kim Alsop (3rd season)
- Home stadium: Seibert Stadium

1986 NCAA Division III independents football records
	Conf.			Overall
Team	W	L	T	W		L		T
No. 5 Salisbury State ^		–		13	–	1	–	0
No. 1 Dayton ^		–		10	–	1	–	0
No. 9 Union (NY) ^		–		9	–	1	–	0
Villanova		–		8	–	1	–	0
No. 20 Buffalo		–		9	–	2	–	0
No. 12 Hofstra ^		–		9	–	2	–	0
Wagner		–		9	–	2	–	0
Millsaps		–		7	–	2	–	0
MacMurray		–		6	–	3	–	0
Wabash		–		6	–	3	–	0
Duquesne		–		5	–	3	–	1
DePauw		–		6	–	4	–	0
Mercyhurst		–		6	–	4	–	0
Western Connecticut State		–		6	–	4	–	0
Canisius		–		5	–	4	–	0
Colorado College		–		5	–	4	–	0
Stony Brook		–		5	–	4	–	0
Georgetown		–		4	–	4	–	0
Menlo		–		4	–	4	–	1
Fairleigh Dickinson–Florham		–		4	–	5	–	0
Saint Francis (PA)		–		4	–	5	–	0
UC Santa Barbara		–		4	–	5	–	0
Albany		–		4	–	6	–	0
Brockport		–		4	–	6	–	0
Brooklyn		–		4	–	6	–	0
San Diego		–		4	–	6	–	0
Marist		–		3	–	5	–	0
Samford		–		3	–	6	–	0
Frostburg State		–		3	–	7	–	0
Ferrum		–		3	–	8	–	0
Catholic University		–		2	–	8	–	1
Aurora		–		1	–	4	–	0
Norwich		–		2	–	8	–	0
Rochester (NY)		–		1	–	7	–	1
Buffalo State		–		1	–	8	–	0
Cortland		–		1	–	8	–	0
Saint Peter's		–		0	–	8	–	0
Wesley		–		0	–	8	–	0
^ – NCAA Division III playoff participant; Rankings from NCAA Division III poll

The 1986 Samford Bulldogs football team was an American football team that represented Samford University as an independent during the 1986 NCAA Division III football season. Led by third-year head coach Kim Alsop, the team compiled a 3–6 record.

In December, Alsop's contract was not renewed by Samford which ended his tenure as head coach of the Bulldogs. In his three seasons with the program, Alsop led the Bulldogs to an overall record of 6 wins and 20 losses.

=== Schedule ===
Date	Opponent	Site	Result	Attendance	Source
September 6	Sewanee	Seibert Stadium; Homewood, AL	W 35–15		
September 13	at Hampden–Sydney	Hundley Stadium; Hampden Sydney, VA	L 15–24		
September 27	at Dayton	Welcome Stadium; Dayton, OH	L 6–42		
October 4	Wingate	Seibert Stadium; Homewood, AL	L 21–35	2,450	
October 11	Anderson (IN)	Seibert Stadium; Homewood, AL	W 34–7		
October 25	at Rhodes	Fargason Field; Memphis, TN	L 14–24	3,200	
November 1	at Millsaps	Alumni Field; Jackson, MS	W 17–14		
November 8	Emory and Henry	Seibert Stadium; Homewood, AL	L 3–49		
November 15	at UCF	Florida Citrus Bowl; Orlando, FL	L 7–66	6,176	

== 1987 ==
1987 Samford Bulldogs football
- Conference: Independent
- Record: 9–1
- Head coach: Terry Bowden (1st season)
- Home stadium: Seibert Stadium

1987 NCAA Division III independents football records
	Conf.			Overall
Team	W	L	T	W		L		T
Wagner ^		–		13	–	1	–	0
Samford		–		9	–	1	–	0
Rochester (NY) ^		–		9	–	2	–	0
Hofstra ^		–		8	–	2	–	0
UC Santa Barbara		–		8	–	2	–	0
Wabash		–		8	–	2	–	0
Dayton ^		–		11	–	3	–	0
Ferrum ^		–		8	–	2	–	1
Salisbury State		–		7	–	2	–	0
Georgetown		–		6	–	2	–	1
DePauw		–		7	–	3	–	0
Menlo ^		–		7	–	3	–	0
Millsaps		–		7	–	3	–	0
Canisius		–		6	–	3	–	1
San Diego		–		6	–	3	–	1
Mercyhurst		–		6	–	4	–	0
Cortland		–		5	–	4	–	0
Fairleigh Dickinson–Florham		–		5	–	4	–	0
Albany		–		5	–	5	–	0
Drake		–		5	–	5	–	0
Norwich		–		4	–	4	–	1
Union (NY)		–		5	–	5	–	0
Aurora		–		4	–	5	–	0
Stony Brook		–		4	–	5	–	0
Brockport		–		3	–	6	–	0
Buffalo		–		3	–	7	–	0
Catholic University		–		3	–	7	–	0
Saint Francis (PA)		–		2	–	6	–	0
Brooklyn		–		2	–	7	–	0
Colorado College		–		2	–	7	–	0
Duquesne		–		2	–	7	–	0
Frostburg State		–		2	–	8	–	0
Saint Peter's		–		2	–	8	–	0
Marist		–		1	–	7	–	0
Quincy		–		1	–	7	–	0
Western Connecticut State		–		1	–	8	–	1
Buffalo State		–		1	–	9	–	0
Wesley		–		0	–	9	–	0
^ – NCAA Division III playoff participant

The 1987 Samford Bulldogs football team was an American football team that represented Samford University as an independent during the 1987 NCAA Division III football season. Led by first-year head coach Terry Bowden, the team compiled a 9–1 record.

In January, Bowden was hired as head coach of the Bulldogs. His father, Bobby Bowden previously served as head coach of the Bulldogs from 1959–1962 when the school was still known as Howard College. Of note, quarterback Jimbo Fisher, who transferred from Salem College, set the Division III record for touchdown passes in a season with 34.

=== Schedule ===
Date	Opponent	Site	Result	Source
September 19	at Cumberland (KY)	Finley-Legion Field; Williamsburg, KY	W 28–23	
September 26	Hampden–Sydney	Seibert Stadium; Homewood, AL	W 49–14	
October 3	at Tennessee Wesleyan	Rankin-Hudson Field; Athens, TN	W 59–7	
October 10	at Anderson (IN)	Macholtz Stadium; Anderson, IN	W 60–16	
October 17	Georgia Southwestern State	Seibert Stadium; Homewood, AL	W 33–14	
October 24	at Emory and Henry	Fullerton Field; Emory, VA	L 37–56	
October 31	Ferrum	Seibert Stadium; Homewood, AL	W 63–42	
November 7	Maryville	Seibert Stadium; Homewood, AL	W 72–10	
November 14	Millsaps	Seibert Stadium; Homewood, AL	W 62–0	
November 21	at Wingate	Walter Bickett Stadium; Monroe, NC	W 54–46	

== 1988 ==
1988 Samford Bulldogs football
- Conference: Independent
- Record: 5–6
- Head coach: Terry Bowden (2nd season)
- Home stadium: Seibert Stadium

1988 NCAA Division III independents football records
	Conf.			Overall
Team	W	L	T	W		L		T
Cortland ^		–		11	–	1	–	0
Ferrum ^		–		11	–	1	–	0
Dayton ^		–		9	–	2	–	0
Hofstra ^		–		9	–	2	–	0
Rochester (NY)		–		8	–	2	–	0
Wagner ^		–		8	–	2	–	0
Aurora		–		7	–	2	–	0
Menlo		–		7	–	2	–	0
Wabash		–		7	–	2	–	0
Fairleigh Dickinson–Florham		–		6	–	2	–	0
Georgetown		–		6	–	2	–	0
Drake		–		7	–	3	–	0
Canisius		–		6	–	3	–	0
Mercyhurst		–		6	–	3	–	0
Salisbury State		–		6	–	3	–	0
Millsaps		–		5	–	3	–	0
Catholic University		–		6	–	4	–	0
UC Santa Barbara		–		6	–	4	–	0
San Diego		–		5	–	4	–	0
Albany		–		5	–	5	–	0
Quincy		–		5	–	5	–	0
Samford		–		5	–	6	–	0
Union (NY)		–		4	–	4	–	0
Colorado College		–		4	–	5	–	0
DePauw		–		4	–	5	–	0
Brockport		–		4	–	6	–	0
Frostburg State		–		4	–	6	–	0
Maryville (TN)		–		4	–	6	–	0
Norwich		–		4	–	6	–	0
Marist		–		3	–	6	–	0
Western Connecticut State		–		3	–	7	–	0
Duquesne		–		2	–	7	–	0
Buffalo		–		2	–	8	–	0
Buffalo State		–		1	–	7	–	0
Saint Francis (PA)		–		1	–	8	–	0
Wesley		–		1	–	8	–	0
^ – NCAA Division III playoff participant

The 1988 Samford Bulldogs football team was an American football team that represented Samford University as an independent during the 1988 NCAA Division III football season. Led by second-year head coach Terry Bowden, the team compiled a 5–6 record.

This was a transitional season for Samford, as they were moving from NCAA Division II to the NCAA's Division I-AA. During the February National Signing Day, they signed ten players to athletic scholarships and had 25 under scholarship by the start of the season.

=== Schedule ===
Date	Opponent	Site	Result	Attendance	Source
September 3	at Jacksonville State	Paul Snow Stadium; Jacksonville, AL (rivalry)	L 6–36	7,000	
September 10	No. 13 (I-AA) Nicholls State	Seibert Stadium; Homewood, AL	L 17–43		
September 17	at Tennessee Tech	Tucker Stadium; Cookeville, TN	W 19–9		
September 24	Livingston	Seibert Stadium; Homewood, AL	W 41–20	5,000	
October 1	at Morehead State	Jayne Stadium; Morehead, KY	W 18–17	3,750	
October 8	at West Georgia	Grisham Stadium; Carrollton, GA	L 14–17		
October 15	Tennessee–Martin	Seibert Stadium; Homewood, AL	L 13–45		
October 29	Mars Hill	Seibert Stadium; Homewood, AL	W 30–13		
November 5	Emory and Henry	Seibert Stadium; Homewood, AL	L 19–21		
November 12	at No. 3 (I-AA) Georgia Southern	Paulson Stadium; Statesboro, GA	L 21–49	20,340	
November 19	Miles	Seibert Stadium; Homewood, AL	W 34–6		
Rankings from The Sports Network Poll released prior to the game
