= 1985 Villanova Wildcats football team =

American college football season

1985 Villanova Wildcats football
- Conference: Independent
- Record: 5–0
- Head coach: Andy Talley (1st season)
- Home stadium: Villanova Stadium

1985 NCAA Division III independents football records
	Conf.			Overall
Team	W	L	T	W		L		T
Villanova		–		5	–	0	–	0
Worcester State		–		5	–	0	–	0
Union (NY) ^		–		9	–	1	–	0
Millsaps		–		7	–	1	–	1
Salisbury State ^		–		10	–	2	–	0
Albany		–		9	–	2	–	0
Wagner		–		9	–	2	–	0
DePauw		–		8	–	2	–	0
Mercyhurst		–		8	–	2	–	0
Wabash		–		7	–	2	–	1
Canisius		–		6	–	2	–	1
Dayton		–		7	–	3	–	0
Marist		–		5	–	3	–	0
Frostburg State		–		6	–	4	–	0
Stony Brook		–		6	–	4	–	0
Fairleigh Dickinson–Florham		–		5	–	4	–	0
Georgetown		–		5	–	4	–	0
Ferrum		–		6	–	5	–	0
Norwich		–		5	–	5	–	0
Cortland		–		4	–	5	–	0
Buffalo		–		4	–	6	–	0
Hofstra		–		4	–	6	–	0
San Diego		–		3	–	5	–	0
Duquesne		–		3	–	6	–	0
MacMurray		–		2	–	4	–	0
Saint Peter's		–		2	–	5	–	0
Brooklyn		–		2	–	6	–	0
Buffalo State		–		2	–	7	–	0
Rochester (NY)		–		2	–	7	–	0
Samford		–		2	–	8	–	0
Catholic University		–		2	–	9	–	0
Brockport		–		1	–	9	–	1
Colorado College		–		1	–	8	–	0
Saint Francis (PA)		–		0	–	9	–	0
^ – NCAA Division III playoff participant

The 1985 Villanova Wildcats football team represented Villanova University in the 1985 NCAA Division III football season. It was the program's first season since 1980, as the team had been discontinued for four years due to perceived lack of financial resources to compete at the Major College (now Football Bowl Subdivision) level. They were led by first-year head coach Andy Talley. Villanova played a "light" schedule against four NCAA Division III opponents and the United States Naval Academy JV team. The Wildcats finished the year 5–0.

== Schedule ==
Date	Opponent	Site	Result
September 21	Iona	Memorial Field; Mount Vernon, NY	W 27–7
October 5	Pace	Villanova Stadium; Villanova, PA	W 45–0
October 19	at Catholic University	Cardinal Stadium; Washington, DC	W 21–7
November 2	Navy JV	Villanova Stadium; Villanova, PA	W 49–20
November 9	at Fordham	Coffey Field; Bronx, NY	W 17–3
