= 1984 Buffalo Bulls football team =

American college football season

1984 Buffalo Bulls football
- Conference: Independent
- Record: 6–4
- Head coach: Bill Dando (8th season)
- Captain: Christopher D'Amico
- Home stadium: Rotary Field

1984 NCAA Division III independents football records
	Conf.			Overall
Team	W	L	T	W		L		T
Dayton ^		–		10	–	1	–	0
Hofstra		–		9	–	1	–	0
Mercyhurst		–		8	–	1	–	0
Millsaps		–		8	–	1	–	0
Norwich		–		9	–	2	–	0
Union (NY) ^		–		9	–	2	–	0
Wabash		–		8	–	2	–	0
Salisbury State		–		6	–	3	–	0
Frostburg State		–		6	–	3	–	1
Buffalo		–		6	–	4	–	0
DePauw		–		6	–	4	–	0
Wagner		–		6	–	4	–	0
Buffalo State		–		5	–	4	–	0
Catholic University		–		5	–	4	–	0
Albany		–		5	–	5	–	0
Fordham		–		5	–	5	–	0
Fairleigh Dickinson–Florham		–		4	–	5	–	0
Stony Brook		–		4	–	5	–	0
Cortland		–		4	–	6	–	0
Duquesne		–		3	–	5	–	0
Canisius		–		2	–	8	–	0
Iona		–		2	–	8	–	0
San Diego		–		1	–	8	–	1
Georgetown		–		1	–	6	–	0
Saint Francis (PA)		–		1	–	7	–	0
Samford		–		1	–	7	–	0
Brockport		–		1	–	8	–	0
Colorado College		–		1	–	8	–	0
Rochester (NY)		–		1	–	8	–	0
^ – NCAA Division III playoff participant

The 1984 Buffalo Bulls football team represented the University at Buffalo as an independent during the 1984 NCAA Division III football season. Led by Bill Dando in his eighth season as head coach, the team compiled a record of 6–4.

== Schedule ==
Date	Opponent	Site	Result	Attendance
September 8	at Cortland	Cortland, NY	L 7–23	4,200
September 15	Mansfield	Rotary Field; Buffalo, NY	W 44–14	2,116
September 22	Rochester	Rotary Field; Buffalo, NY	W 35–7	2,518
September 29	Buffalo State	Rotary Field; Buffalo, NY	W 6–2	3,842
October 6	Canisius	Buffalo, NY	W 19–10	5,051
October 13	Ithaca	Rotary Field; Buffalo, NY	L 6–10	4,128
October 20	Brockport	Rotary Field; Buffalo, NY	W 44–15	3,523
October 27	at Alfred	Alfred, NY	L 0–17	4,170
November 3	at Albany	Albany, NY	L 10–33	856
November 10	at Lock Haven	Lock Haven, PA	W 21–9	1,500
