= 1988 Buffalo Bulls football team =

American college football season

1988 Buffalo Bulls football
- Conference: Independent
- Record: 2–8
- Head coach: Bill Dando (12th season)
- Captains: Joe Cassata; Kevin Deakin
- Home stadium: Rotary Field

1988 NCAA Division III independents football records
	Conf.			Overall
Team	W	L	T	W		L		T
Cortland ^		–		11	–	1	–	0
Ferrum ^		–		11	–	1	–	0
Dayton ^		–		9	–	2	–	0
Hofstra ^		–		9	–	2	–	0
Rochester (NY)		–		8	–	2	–	0
Wagner ^		–		8	–	2	–	0
Aurora		–		7	–	2	–	0
Menlo		–		7	–	2	–	0
Wabash		–		7	–	2	–	0
Fairleigh Dickinson–Florham		–		6	–	2	–	0
Georgetown		–		6	–	2	–	0
Drake		–		7	–	3	–	0
Canisius		–		6	–	3	–	0
Mercyhurst		–		6	–	3	–	0
Salisbury State		–		6	–	3	–	0
Millsaps		–		5	–	3	–	0
Catholic University		–		6	–	4	–	0
UC Santa Barbara		–		6	–	4	–	0
San Diego		–		5	–	4	–	0
Albany		–		5	–	5	–	0
Quincy		–		5	–	5	–	0
Samford		–		5	–	6	–	0
Union (NY)		–		4	–	4	–	0
Colorado College		–		4	–	5	–	0
DePauw		–		4	–	5	–	0
Brockport		–		4	–	6	–	0
Frostburg State		–		4	–	6	–	0
Maryville (TN)		–		4	–	6	–	0
Norwich		–		4	–	6	–	0
Marist		–		3	–	6	–	0
Western Connecticut State		–		3	–	7	–	0
Duquesne		–		2	–	7	–	0
Buffalo		–		2	–	8	–	0
Buffalo State		–		1	–	7	–	0
Saint Francis (PA)		–		1	–	8	–	0
Wesley		–		1	–	8	–	0
^ – NCAA Division III playoff participant

The 1988 Buffalo Bulls football team represented the University at Buffalo as an independent during the 1988 NCAA Division III football season. Led by Bill Dando in his 12th season as head coach, the team compiled a record of 2–8.

== Schedule ==
Date	Opponent	Site	Result	Attendance	Source
September 10	Findlay	Rotary Field; Buffalo, NY	W 7–3		
September 17	Buffalo State	Rotary Field; Buffalo, NY	L 23–24		
September 24	Westminster (PA)	Rotary Field; Buffalo, NY	L 12–14		
October 1	at Hofstra	Hofstra Stadium; Hempstead, NY	L 14–43		
October 8	Canisius	Rotary Field; Buffalo, NY	L 15–38		
October 15	Ithaca	Rotary Field; Buffalo, NY	L 3–36	3,487	
October 22	Brockport	Rotary Field; Buffalo, NY	W 38–7		
October 29	at Alfred	Alfred Field; Alfred, NY	L 7–27		
November 5	at Albany	University Field; Albany, NY	L 20–28		
November 12	Slippery Rock	Rotary Field; Buffalo, NY	L 9–17		
