= 1986 UC Santa Barbara Gauchos football team =

American college football season

1986 UC Santa Barbara Gauchos football
- Conference: Independent
- Record: 4–5
- Head coach: Mike Warren (1st season)
- Home stadium: Harder Stadium

1986 NCAA Division III independents football records
	Conf.			Overall
Team	W	L	T	W		L		T
No. 5 Salisbury State ^		–		13	–	1	–	0
No. 1 Dayton ^		–		10	–	1	–	0
No. 9 Union (NY) ^		–		9	–	1	–	0
Villanova		–		8	–	1	–	0
No. 20 Buffalo		–		9	–	2	–	0
No. 12 Hofstra ^		–		9	–	2	–	0
Wagner		–		9	–	2	–	0
Millsaps		–		7	–	2	–	0
MacMurray		–		6	–	3	–	0
Wabash		–		6	–	3	–	0
Duquesne		–		5	–	3	–	1
DePauw		–		6	–	4	–	0
Mercyhurst		–		6	–	4	–	0
Western Connecticut State		–		6	–	4	–	0
Canisius		–		5	–	4	–	0
Colorado College		–		5	–	4	–	0
Stony Brook		–		5	–	4	–	0
Georgetown		–		4	–	4	–	0
Menlo		–		4	–	4	–	1
Fairleigh Dickinson–Florham		–		4	–	5	–	0
Saint Francis (PA)		–		4	–	5	–	0
UC Santa Barbara		–		4	–	5	–	0
Albany		–		4	–	6	–	0
Brockport		–		4	–	6	–	0
Brooklyn		–		4	–	6	–	0
San Diego		–		4	–	6	–	0
Marist		–		3	–	5	–	0
Samford		–		3	–	6	–	0
Frostburg State		–		3	–	7	–	0
Ferrum		–		3	–	8	–	0
Catholic University		–		2	–	8	–	1
Aurora		–		1	–	4	–	0
Norwich		–		2	–	8	–	0
Rochester (NY)		–		1	–	7	–	1
Buffalo State		–		1	–	8	–	0
Cortland		–		1	–	8	–	0
Saint Peter's		–		0	–	8	–	0
Wesley		–		0	–	8	–	0
^ – NCAA Division III playoff participant; Rankings from NCAA Division III poll

The 1986 UC Santa Barbara Gauchos football team represented the University of California, Santa Barbara (UCSB) as an independent during the 1986 NCAA Division III football season. Led by first-year head coach Mike Warren, a UCSB alum, the Gauchos compiled a record of 4–5 and were outscored by their opponents 163 to 158 for the season. The team played home games at Harder Stadium in Santa Barbara, California.

This was the first year since the program had disbanded after the 1971 season that UC Santa Barbara participated in football sanctioned by the National Collegiate Athletic Association (NCAA). From 1983 to 1985, a student-run club team competed, but games played during those years are not considered in NCAA records.

== Schedule ==
Date	Opponent	Site	Result	Attendance	Source
September 13	at Redlands	Redlands Stadium; Redlands, CA	W 28–2	1,357	
September 20	at Humboldt State	Redwood Bowl; Arcata, CA	L 7–27	5,000	
September 27	Pomona-Pitzer	Harder Stadium; Santa Barbara, CA	W 28–15	2,749–3,749	
October 4	Whittier	Harder Stadium; Santa Barbara, CA	L 13–20	4,991	
October 11	Saint Mary’s	Harder Stadium; Santa Barbara, CA	L 9–14	1,851	
October 18	Claremont-Mudd	Harder Stadium; Santa Barbara, CA	L 13–16	1,118	
October 25	at San Diego	Torero Stadium; San Diego, CA	W 14–8	1,300	
November 8	at Azusa Pacific	Cougar Athletic Stadium; Azusa, CA	W 17–14	2,204	
November 15	Sonoma State^{†}	Harder Stadium; Santa Barbara, CA	L 29–47	8,815	
^{†}Homecoming
