= 1985 Buffalo Bulls football team =

American college football season

1985 Buffalo Bulls football
- Conference: Independent
- Record: 4–6
- Head coach: Bill Dando (9th season)
- Captains: Dean Angelo; Jim Dunbar; Bob Kirisits; Mike Laipple
- Home stadium: Rotary Field

1985 NCAA Division III independents football records
	Conf.			Overall
Team	W	L	T	W		L		T
Villanova		–		5	–	0	–	0
Worcester State		–		5	–	0	–	0
Union (NY) ^		–		9	–	1	–	0
Millsaps		–		7	–	1	–	1
Salisbury State ^		–		10	–	2	–	0
Albany		–		9	–	2	–	0
Wagner		–		9	–	2	–	0
DePauw		–		8	–	2	–	0
Mercyhurst		–		8	–	2	–	0
Wabash		–		7	–	2	–	1
Canisius		–		6	–	2	–	1
Dayton		–		7	–	3	–	0
Marist		–		5	–	3	–	0
Frostburg State		–		6	–	4	–	0
Stony Brook		–		6	–	4	–	0
Fairleigh Dickinson–Florham		–		5	–	4	–	0
Georgetown		–		5	–	4	–	0
Ferrum		–		6	–	5	–	0
Norwich		–		5	–	5	–	0
Cortland		–		4	–	5	–	0
Buffalo		–		4	–	6	–	0
Hofstra		–		4	–	6	–	0
San Diego		–		3	–	5	–	0
Duquesne		–		3	–	6	–	0
MacMurray		–		2	–	4	–	0
Saint Peter's		–		2	–	5	–	0
Brooklyn		–		2	–	6	–	0
Buffalo State		–		2	–	7	–	0
Rochester (NY)		–		2	–	7	–	0
Samford		–		2	–	8	–	0
Catholic University		–		2	–	9	–	0
Brockport		–		1	–	9	–	1
Colorado College		–		1	–	8	–	0
Saint Francis (PA)		–		0	–	9	–	0
^ – NCAA Division III playoff participant

The 1985 Buffalo Bulls football team represented the University at Buffalo as an independent during the 1985 NCAA Division III football season. Led by Bill Dando in his ninth season as head coach, the team compiled a record of 4–6.

== Schedule ==
Date	Opponent	Site	Result	Attendance
September 14	Cortland	Rotary Field; Buffalo, NY	W 31–14	4,816
September 21	at Mansfield	Mansfield, PA	L 19–28	3,500
September 28	at Rochester	Rochester, NY	W 21–19	2,817
October 5	Buffalo State	Rotary Field; Buffalo, NY	W 30–11	500
October 12	Canisius	Rotary Field; Buffalo, NY	L 25–34	5,233
October 19	at Ithaca	Ithaca, NY	L 7–23	493
October 26	at Brockport	Brockport, NY	W 13–11	512
November 2	Alfred	Rotary Field; Buffalo, NY	L 7–14	1,259
November 9	Albany	Rotary Field; Buffalo, NY	L 0–20	487
November 16	Lock Haven	Rotary Field; Buffalo, NY	L 21–23	150
