= 1985 Worcester State Lancers football team =

American college football season

1985 Worcester State Lancers football
- Conference: Independent
- Record: 5–0
- Head coach: Brien Cullen (3rd season)

1985 NCAA Division III independents football records
	Conf.			Overall
Team	W	L	T	W		L		T
Villanova		–		5	–	0	–	0
Worcester State		–		5	–	0	–	0
Union (NY) ^		–		9	–	1	–	0
Millsaps		–		7	–	1	–	1
Salisbury State ^		–		10	–	2	–	0
Albany		–		9	–	2	–	0
Wagner		–		9	–	2	–	0
DePauw		–		8	–	2	–	0
Mercyhurst		–		8	–	2	–	0
Wabash		–		7	–	2	–	1
Canisius		–		6	–	2	–	1
Dayton		–		7	–	3	–	0
Marist		–		5	–	3	–	0
Frostburg State		–		6	–	4	–	0
Stony Brook		–		6	–	4	–	0
Fairleigh Dickinson–Florham		–		5	–	4	–	0
Georgetown		–		5	–	4	–	0
Ferrum		–		6	–	5	–	0
Norwich		–		5	–	5	–	0
Cortland		–		4	–	5	–	0
Buffalo		–		4	–	6	–	0
Hofstra		–		4	–	6	–	0
San Diego		–		3	–	5	–	0
Duquesne		–		3	–	6	–	0
MacMurray		–		2	–	4	–	0
Saint Peter's		–		2	–	5	–	0
Brooklyn		–		2	–	6	–	0
Buffalo State		–		2	–	7	–	0
Rochester (NY)		–		2	–	7	–	0
Samford		–		2	–	8	–	0
Catholic University		–		2	–	9	–	0
Brockport		–		1	–	9	–	1
Colorado College		–		1	–	8	–	0
Saint Francis (PA)		–		0	–	9	–	0
^ – NCAA Division III playoff participant

The 1985 Worcester State Lancers football team was an American football team that represented Worcester State University as an NCAA Division III independent during the 1985 NCAA Division III football season. In their first year of existence under head coach Brien Cullen, the Lancers compiled a perfect 5–0 record.

Worcester State entered 1985 as an independent in its first year as a varsity football team. In 1984, the school finished 11–0 and were named national club champions. In May 1985, Worcester State announced they were joining the New England Football Conference (NEFC) in 1986 as the conference's twelfth member.

== Schedule ==
Date	Opponent	Site	Result	Attendance	Source
September 7	at Western New England	Springfield, MA	W 14–0	2,000	
September 14	at Fitchburg State	Fitchburg, MA	W 39–12	850	
October 5	at Stony Brook	Seawolves Field; Stony Brook, NY	W 35–10	300–900	
October 12	at William Paterson	Wayne, NJ	W 31–27	750	
November 1	Lowell	Worcester, MA	W 35–7	2,500	
