= 1983 Buffalo Bulls football team =

American college football season

1983 Buffalo Bulls football
- Conference: Independent
- Record: 8–2
- Head coach: Bill Dando (7th season)
- Captains: John Greeley; Gerald Quinlivan
- Home stadium: Rotary Field

1983 NCAA Division III independents football records
	Conf.			Overall
Team	W	L	T	W		L		T
WPI		–		8	–	0	–	0
Hofstra ^		–		10	–	1	–	0
Salisbury State ^		–		10	–	1	–	1
Union (NY) ^		–		10	–	2	–	0
Buffalo		–		8	–	2	–	0
Millsaps		–		7	–	2	–	0
Wagner		–		8	–	2	–	1
Dayton		–		7	–	3	–	0
DePauw		–		7	–	3	–	0
Mercyhurst		–		5	–	3	–	1
Buffalo State		–		5	–	4	–	0
Canisius		–		5	–	4	–	0
Wabash		–		5	–	4	–	0
Duquesne		–		5	–	4	–	1
Norwich		–		5	–	5	–	0
San Diego		–		5	–	5	–	0
Cortland		–		4	–	5	–	0
Rochester (NY)		–		4	–	5	–	0
Merchant Marine		–		4	–	5	–	0
Grove City		–		3	–	6	–	0
Iona		–		3	–	6	–	0
Albany		–		3	–	7	–	0
Georgetown		–		2	–	6	–	0
Lebanon Valley		–		2	–	7	–	1
Colorado College		–		2	–	7	–	0
Frostburg State		–		2	–	8	–	0
Fordham		–		2	–	9	–	0
Saint Francis (PA)		–		1	–	7	–	0
Fairleigh Dickinson–Florham		–		1	–	8	–	0
Brockport		–		0	–	10	–	0
^ – NCAA Division III playoff participant

The 1983 Buffalo Bulls football team represented the University at Buffalo as an independent during the 1983 NCAA Division III football season. Led by Bill Dando in his seventh season as head coach, the team compiled a record of 8–2.

== Schedule ==
Date	Opponent	Site	Result	Attendance
September 10	Cortland	Rotary Field; Buffalo, NY	W 35–0	3,463
September 17	Baldwin–Wallace	Rotary Field; Buffalo, NY	W 29–8	3,211
September 24	at Rochester	Rochester, NY	W 21–7	1,907
October 1	at Buffalo State	Buffalo, NY	L 7–24	3,109
October 8	Canisius	Rotary Field; Buffalo, NY	W 10–6	5,816
October 15	at Ithaca	Ithaca. NY	L 13–28	4,340
October 22	at Brockport	Brockport, NY	W 24–6	350
October 29	at Norwich	Northfield, VT	W 31–21	2,000
November 5	Albany	Rotary Field; Buffalo, NY	W 15–13	987
November 12	Alfred	Rotary Field; Buffalo, NY	W 47–17	526
