= 1981 Buffalo Bulls football team =

American college football season

1981 Buffalo Bulls football
- Conference: Independent
- Record: 5–5
- Head coach: Bill Dando (5th season)
- Captains: Frank Berrafato; John White; Brian Wilson
- Home stadium: Rotary Field

1981 NCAA Division III independents football records
	Conf.			Overall
Team	W	L	T	W		L		T
DePauw		–		9	–	1	–	0
San Diego		–		9	–	1	–	0
Wagner		–		9	–	1	–	0
West Georgia ^		–		9	–	1	–	0
Dayton ^		–		12	–	2	–	0
Wabash		–		8	–	1	–	0
Millsaps		–		7	–	2	–	0
WPI		–		6	–	2	–	0
Albany		–		7	–	3	–	0
Georgetown		–		5	–	3	–	0
Cortland		–		6	–	4	–	0
Brockport		–		5	–	5	–	0
Buffalo		–		5	–	5	–	0
Buffalo State		–		3	–	3	–	0
Fordham		–		5	–	5	–	0
Iona		–		5	–	5	–	0
Mercyhurst		–		4	–	2	–	1
Rochester (NY)		–		4	–	4	–	1
Union (NY)		–		4	–	4	–	1
Colorado College		–		4	–	5	–	0
Duquesne		–		4	–	5	–	0
Frostburg State		–		4	–	5	–	0
Canisius		–		4	–	6	–	0
Hofstra		–		4	–	6	–	0
UCF		–		4	–	6	–	0
Saint Francis (PA)		–		3	–	6	–	1
Norwich		–		3	–	7	–	0
Grove City		–		2	–	7	–	0
Salisbury State		–		2	–	7	–	0
St. Norbert		–		2	–	7	–	0
Catholic University		–		1	–	8	–	0
Merchant Marine		–		1	–	9	–	0
^ – NCAA Division III playoff participant

The 1981 Buffalo Bulls football team represented the University at Buffalo as an independent during the 1981 NCAA Division III football season. Led by Bill Dando in his fifth season as head coach, the team compiled a record of 5–5.

== Schedule ==
Date	Opponent	Site	Result	Attendance
September 12	Cortland	Rotary Field; Buffalo, NY	W 34–7	3,465
September 19	at Grove City	Grove City, PA	W 42–6	3,000
September 26	at Hobart	Geneva, NY	W 41–10	2,500
October 3	Wayne State (MI)	Rotary Field; Buffalo, NY	W 27–14	2,160
October 10	at Albany	University Field; Albany, NY	L 0–32	2,000
October 17	Canisius	Rotary Field; Buffalo, NY	W 15–8	7,251
October 24	Dayton	Rotary Field; Buffalo, NY	L 7–14	2,048
October 31	at Edinboro	Edinboro, PA	L 0–35	1,500
November 7	Westminster (PA)	Rotary Field; Buffalo, NY	L 0–14	1,136
November 14	at St. Lawrence	Canton, NY	L 21–28	2,000
