= 1986 Villanova Wildcats football team =

American college football season

1986 Villanova Wildcats football
- Conference: Independent
- Record: 8–1
- Head coach: Andy Talley (2nd season)
- Home stadium: Villanova Stadium

1986 NCAA Division III independents football records
	Conf.			Overall
Team	W	L	T	W		L		T
No. 5 Salisbury State ^		–		13	–	1	–	0
No. 1 Dayton ^		–		10	–	1	–	0
No. 9 Union (NY) ^		–		9	–	1	–	0
Villanova		–		8	–	1	–	0
No. 20 Buffalo		–		9	–	2	–	0
No. 12 Hofstra ^		–		9	–	2	–	0
Wagner		–		9	–	2	–	0
Millsaps		–		7	–	2	–	0
MacMurray		–		6	–	3	–	0
Wabash		–		6	–	3	–	0
Duquesne		–		5	–	3	–	1
DePauw		–		6	–	4	–	0
Mercyhurst		–		6	–	4	–	0
Western Connecticut State		–		6	–	4	–	0
Canisius		–		5	–	4	–	0
Colorado College		–		5	–	4	–	0
Stony Brook		–		5	–	4	–	0
Georgetown		–		4	–	4	–	0
Menlo		–		4	–	4	–	1
Fairleigh Dickinson–Florham		–		4	–	5	–	0
Saint Francis (PA)		–		4	–	5	–	0
UC Santa Barbara		–		4	–	5	–	0
Albany		–		4	–	6	–	0
Brockport		–		4	–	6	–	0
Brooklyn		–		4	–	6	–	0
San Diego		–		4	–	6	–	0
Marist		–		3	–	5	–	0
Samford		–		3	–	6	–	0
Frostburg State		–		3	–	7	–	0
Ferrum		–		3	–	8	–	0
Catholic University		–		2	–	8	–	1
Aurora		–		1	–	4	–	0
Norwich		–		2	–	8	–	0
Rochester (NY)		–		1	–	7	–	1
Buffalo State		–		1	–	8	–	0
Cortland		–		1	–	8	–	0
Saint Peter's		–		0	–	8	–	0
Wesley		–		0	–	8	–	0
^ – NCAA Division III playoff participant; Rankings from NCAA Division III poll

The 1986 Villanova Wildcats football team was an American football team that represented the Villanova University as an independent during the 1986 NCAA Division III football season. In their second year under head coach Andy Talley, the team compiled a 8–1 record.

== Schedule ==
Date	Opponent	Site	Result	Attendance	Source
September 19	at Iona	Memorial Field; Mount Vernon, NY	W 40–6	2,378	
September 27	at Mercyhurst	Saxon Stadium; Erie, PA	W 42–35	2,978	
October 4	Buffalo	Villanova Stadium; Villanova, PA	L 27–29	13,900	
October 11	Fordham	Villanova Stadium; Villanova, PA	W 52–14	10,856	
October 18	at Catholic University	Cardinal Stadium; Washington, DC	W 20–7	2,873	
October 25	Ursinus	Villanova Stadium; Villanova, PA	W 34–16	9,832	
November 1	at Columbia	Wien Stadium; New York, NY	W 42–34	4,750	
November 8	Central Connecticut State	Villanova Stadium; Villanova, PA	W 28–0	13,400	
November 15	Widener	Villanova Stadium; Villanova, PA	W 28–9	11,425	
