= 1983 WPI Engineers football team =

American college football season

1983 WPI Engineers football
- Conference: Independent
- Record: 8–0
- Head coach: Bob Weiss (6th season)
- Home stadium: Alumni Stadium

1983 NCAA Division III independents football records
| | Conf. | | | Overall |
| Team | W | L | T | W | | L | | T |
|---|---|---|---|---|---|---|---|---|
| WPI | | – | | 8 | – | 0 | – | 0 |
| Hofstra ^ | | – | | 10 | – | 1 | – | 0 |
| Salisbury State ^ | | – | | 10 | – | 1 | – | 1 |
| Union (NY) ^ | | – | | 10 | – | 2 | – | 0 |
| Buffalo | | – | | 8 | – | 2 | – | 0 |
| Millsaps | | – | | 7 | – | 2 | – | 0 |
| Wagner | | – | | 8 | – | 2 | – | 1 |
| Dayton | | – | | 7 | – | 3 | – | 0 |
| DePauw | | – | | 7 | – | 3 | – | 0 |
| Mercyhurst | | – | | 5 | – | 3 | – | 1 |
| Buffalo State | | – | | 5 | – | 4 | – | 0 |
| Canisius | | – | | 5 | – | 4 | – | 0 |
| Wabash | | – | | 5 | – | 4 | – | 0 |
| Duquesne | | – | | 5 | – | 4 | – | 1 |
| Norwich | | – | | 5 | – | 5 | – | 0 |
| San Diego | | – | | 5 | – | 5 | – | 0 |
| Cortland | | – | | 4 | – | 5 | – | 0 |
| Rochester (NY) | | – | | 4 | – | 5 | – | 0 |
| Merchant Marine | | – | | 4 | – | 5 | – | 0 |
| Grove City | | – | | 3 | – | 6 | – | 0 |
| Iona | | – | | 3 | – | 6 | – | 0 |
| Albany | | – | | 3 | – | 7 | – | 0 |
| Georgetown | | – | | 2 | – | 6 | – | 0 |
| Lebanon Valley | | – | | 2 | – | 7 | – | 1 |
| Colorado College | | – | | 2 | – | 7 | – | 0 |
| Frostburg State | | – | | 2 | – | 8 | – | 0 |
| Fordham | | – | | 2 | – | 9 | – | 0 |
| Saint Francis (PA) | | – | | 1 | – | 7 | – | 0 |
| Fairleigh Dickinson–Florham | | – | | 1 | – | 8 | – | 0 |
| Brockport | | – | | 0 | – | 10 | – | 0 |
^ – NCAA Division III playoff participant

The 1983 WPI Engineers football team was an American football team that represented the Worcester Polytechnic Institute (WPI) as an independent during the 1983 NCAA Division III football season. In their sixth year under head coach Bob Weiss, the Engineers compiled an 8–0 record and outscored opponents by a total of 225 to 56. The team was named Division III Team of the Year by the New England Football Newsletter, and Weiss was honored as 1983 Coach of the Year by the New England College Football Writers Association.

Despite the team's undefeated and untied record, WPI was not invited to participate in the NCAA Division III Football Championship playoffs. Weiss responded to the omission: "How do you explain to 83 kids that they're unbeaten but unworthy?"

Tailback Mike Carbone led the team with 1,115 rushing yards.

== Schedule ==
| Date | Opponent | Site | Result | Attendance | Source |
|---|---|---|---|---|---|
| September 24 | at Coast Guard | Cadet Memorial Field; New London, CT | W 35–14 | | |
| October 1 | Colby | Alumni Stadium; Worcester, MA | W 30–7 | | |
| October 8 | Lowell | Alumni Stadium; Worcester, MA | W 7–0 | | |
| October 15 | Fordham | Alumni Stadium; Worcester, MA | W 22–6 | 2,000 | |
| October 22 | at Bates | Lewiston, ME | W 10–7 | | |
| October 29 | RPI | Alumni Stadium; Worcester, MA | W 28–8 | | |
| November 5 | at Hamilton | Clinton, NY | W 42–0 | | |
| November 12 | at Fairleigh Dickinson–Florham | Madison, NJ | W 51–14 | | |
