= 1986 Buffalo Bulls football team =

American college football season

1986 Buffalo Bulls football
- Conference: Independent
- Record: 9–2
- Head coach: Bill Dando (10th season)
- Captains: Jim Dunbar; Mike Laipple
- Home stadium: Rotary Field

1986 NCAA Division III independents football records
	Conf.			Overall
Team	W	L	T	W		L		T
No. 5 Salisbury State ^		–		13	–	1	–	0
No. 1 Dayton ^		–		10	–	1	–	0
No. 9 Union (NY) ^		–		9	–	1	–	0
Villanova		–		8	–	1	–	0
No. 20 Buffalo		–		9	–	2	–	0
No. 12 Hofstra ^		–		9	–	2	–	0
Wagner		–		9	–	2	–	0
Millsaps		–		7	–	2	–	0
MacMurray		–		6	–	3	–	0
Wabash		–		6	–	3	–	0
Duquesne		–		5	–	3	–	1
DePauw		–		6	–	4	–	0
Mercyhurst		–		6	–	4	–	0
Western Connecticut State		–		6	–	4	–	0
Canisius		–		5	–	4	–	0
Colorado College		–		5	–	4	–	0
Stony Brook		–		5	–	4	–	0
Georgetown		–		4	–	4	–	0
Menlo		–		4	–	4	–	1
Fairleigh Dickinson–Florham		–		4	–	5	–	0
Saint Francis (PA)		–		4	–	5	–	0
UC Santa Barbara		–		4	–	5	–	0
Albany		–		4	–	6	–	0
Brockport		–		4	–	6	–	0
Brooklyn		–		4	–	6	–	0
San Diego		–		4	–	6	–	0
Marist		–		3	–	5	–	0
Samford		–		3	–	6	–	0
Frostburg State		–		3	–	7	–	0
Ferrum		–		3	–	8	–	0
Catholic University		–		2	–	8	–	1
Aurora		–		1	–	4	–	0
Norwich		–		2	–	8	–	0
Rochester (NY)		–		1	–	7	–	1
Buffalo State		–		1	–	8	–	0
Cortland		–		1	–	8	–	0
Saint Peter's		–		0	–	8	–	0
Wesley		–		0	–	8	–	0
^ – NCAA Division III playoff participant; Rankings from NCAA Division III poll

The 1986 Buffalo Bulls football team represented the University at Buffalo as an independent during the 1986 NCAA Division III football season. Led by Bill Dando in his tenth season as head coach, the team compiled a record of 9–2.

== Schedule ==
Date	Opponent	Site	Result	Attendance	Source
September 6	at Towson State	Towson, MD	L 8–37	4,359	
September 13	at Cortland	Cortland, NY	W 23–22	4,200	
September 20	Buffalo State	Rotary Field; Buffalo, NY	W 37–7	4,387	
September 27	Rochester	Rotary Field; Buffalo, NY	W 21–19	3,246	
October 4	at Villanova	Villanova Stadium; Villanova, PA	W 29–27	13,900	
October 11	at Canisius	Buffalo, NY	W 38–7	2,087	
October 18	Ithaca	Rotary Field; Buffalo, NY	L 21–22	4,180	
October 25	Brockport	Rotary Field; Buffalo, NY	W 21–14	3,963	
November 1	at Alfred	Alfred, NY	W 13–10	3,313	
November 8	at Albany	University Field; Albany, NY	W 11–10	895	
November 15	Frostburg State	Rotary Field; Buffalo, NY	W 42–7	1,323	
