= 1978 Buffalo Bulls football team =

American college football season

1978 Buffalo Bulls football
- Conference: Independent
- Record: 3–6
- Head coach: Bill Dando (2nd season)
- Captains: James Vaux; Daniel Vecchies
- Home stadium: Rotary Field

1978 NCAA Division III independents football records
	Conf.			Overall
Team	W	L	T	W		L		T
Maryville (TN)		–		8	–	1	–	0
Wabash		–		8	–	1	–	0
Georgetown		–		7	–	1	–	0
James Madison		–		8	–	2	–	0
Dayton ^		–		9	–	2	–	1
Albany		–		7	–	3	–	0
Catholic University		–		7	–	3	–	0
Fordham		–		7	–	3	–	0
Saint Mary's		–		7	–	3	–	0
San Diego		–		7	–	3	–	0
Towson State		–		7	–	3	–	0
Colorado College		–		6	–	3	–	0
Merchant Marine		–		5	–	5	–	0
Bowie State		–		5	–	4	–	0
Brockport		–		5	–	4	–	0
Millsaps		–		5	–	4	–	0
Norwich		–		5	–	4	–	0
Rochester (NY)		–		5	–	4	–	0
Cortland		–		5	–	5	–	0
Grove City		–		4	–	4	–	1
Salisbury State		–		5	–	5	–	0
Canisius		–		4	–	5	–	0
Hofstra		–		4	–	5	–	0
Saint Francis (PA)		–		4	–	5	–	0
Union (NY)		–		3	–	5	–	0
Buffalo		–		3	–	6	–	0
Frostburg State		–		3	–	7	–	0
St. Norbert		–		3	–	7	–	0
Plattsburgh		–		2	–	6	–	0
WPI		–		2	–	6	–	0
DePauw		–		2	–	7	–	0
Wagner		–		2	–	8	–	0
Fairleigh Dickinson–Florham		–		1	–	8	–	0
^ – NCAA Division III playoff participant

The 1978 Buffalo Bulls football team represented the University at Buffalo as an independent during the 1978 NCAA Division III football season. Led by Bill Dando in his second season as head coach, the team compiled a record of 3–6.

== Schedule ==
Date	Opponent	Site	Result	Attendance
September 9	at Cortland	Cortland, NY	L 14–35	2,000
September 16	John Carroll	Rotary Field; Buffalo, NY	L 13–17	3,460
September 23	Brockport	Rotary Field; Buffalo, NY	W 35–31	3,321
September 30	at Waynesburg	Waynesburg, PA	L 13–30	1,500
October 7	at Canisius	Buffalo, NY	W 16–10	2,750
October 14	Albany	Rotary Field; Buffalo, NY	W 15–8	1,342
October 28	Rochester	Rotary Field; Buffalo, NY	L 21–31	1,633
November 4	at Coast Guard	New London, CT	L 25–29	1,497
November 11	Alfred	Rotary Field; Buffalo, NY	L 12–20	2,963
