= Kim Alsop =

American football player and coach

Biographical details
- Born: c. 1933

Playing career
- c. 1955: West Chester
- Position: Quarterback

Coaching career (HC unless noted)
- 1960–?: Northeast HS (FL) (assistant)
- ?–1968: Northeast HS (FL)
- 1969–1970: Miami Christian (FL)
- 1971: Westminster Christian (FL) (assistant)
- 1972–1977: Westminster Christian (FL)
- 1979: Shorecrest Prep (FL)
- 1980–1982: Richmond (assistant)
- 1983: Northside Christian (FL)
- 1984–1986: Samford
- c. 1987: Louisiana Tech (S&C)
- 1989–1993: Jackson Academy (MS)

Head coaching record
- Overall: 6–21 (college)

Kim Alsop (born c. 1933) is an American former football coach. In 1984, he was hired to restart the football program at Samford University, which had been dormant since the end of the 1973 season. In his three season with the team, Samford compiled a 6–21 record. He was dismissed after his third season and replaced by Terry Bowden. Following Samford, Alsop accepted a position as strength and conditioning coach with at Louisiana Tech University under head coach Carl Torbush.

Alsop was hired as the head football coach at Jackson Academy, an independent school in Jackson, Mississippi, in 1989. After the 1993 season when Jackson Academy missed the playoffs, Alsop left coaching. He was replaced by Sherard Shaw.

== Head coaching record ==
=== College ===
Year	Team	Overall	Conference	Standing	Bowl/playoffs
Samford Bulldogs (NCAA Division III independent) (1984–1986)
1984	Samford	1–7			
1985	Samford	2–8			
1986	Samford	3–6			
Samford:		6–21			
Total:		6–21			
