= Oscar Lewis (American football) =

American football coach (born c.1952)

Coaching career (HC unless noted)
- 1976: Frostburg State

Head coaching record
- Overall: 0–3

Oscar Lewis (born c. 1952) is an American former football coach. He was the fifth head football coach at Frostburg State University in Frostburg, Maryland, serving for final three games of the 1976 season and compiling a record of 0–3. Lewis was named the head coach after Mike Davis had completed a record of 1–16 since the start of the 1975 season. Lewis coached the remaining games and then stepped down.
