= 1977 Buffalo Bulls football team =

American college football season

1977 Buffalo Bulls football
- Record: 0–3–1 ( )
- Head coach: Bill Dando (1st season)
- Captains: Paul DiMiero; Bernie McKeever
- Home stadium: Rotary Field

The 1977 Buffalo Bulls football team represented the University at Buffalo during the 1977 college football season. Led by Bill Dando in his first season as head coach, the team compiled a record of 0–3–1.

== Schedule ==
Date	Opponent	Site	Result
October 8	RIT	Rotary Field; Buffalo, NY	T 7–7
October 15	Canisius	Rotary Field; Buffalo, NY	L 8–22
October 22	at SUNY Brockport	Brockport, NY	L 7–17
November 5	Coast Guard	Rotary Field; Buffalo, NY	L 14–41
