= Adam Peloquin =

American football coach (born 1990)

Current position
- Title: Assistant coach
- Team: Shepherd Hill HS (MA)

Biographical details
- Born: c. 1990 (age 35–36); Spencer, Massachusetts, U.S.
- Education: Worcester State University (2012)

Playing career
- 2008: Bryant
- 2009–2011: Worcester State
- Position: Guard

Coaching career (HC unless noted)
- 2011–2014: Worcester State (OL)
- 2015–2019: Worcester State (OC/OL/ST)
- 2019: Worcester State (OC/QB)
- 2020–2021: Worcester State (interim HC/OC/QB)
- 2022–2023: Worcester State
- 2024: Leicester HS (MA) (assistant)
- 2025–present: Shepherd Hill HS (MA) (assistant)

Head coaching record
- Overall: 5–25

Accomplishments and honors

Awards
- As player: All-NEFC (2011)

Adam Peloquin (born c. 1990) is an American football coach. He is an assistant football coach for Shepherd Hill Regional High School, a position he has held since 2025. He was the head football coach for Worcester State University from 2020 to 2023. He played college football for Bryant and Worcester State as a guard.

== Playing career ==
Peloquin was a three-year starter out of Spencer, Massachusetts, for Worcester State which he transferred to after his freshman year at Bryant. In his senior year he earned All-NEFC honors and All-Worcester Honors.

== Coaching career ==
Peloquin started his coaching career as his alma mater's offensive line coach. In 2015 he was promoted to Worcester State's offensive coordinator and special teams coordinator positions while also maintaining his offensive line responsibilities. Following the retirement of Brien Cullen, Peloquin was named interim head coach. The 2020 season was canceled due to COVID-19. On December 8, 2021, he earned the full-time coaching spot after two years of having the interim tag. He resigned after the 2023 season with a career record of 5–25.

In 2024, Peloquin was hired as an assistant coach for Leicester High School.

== Head coaching record ==
Year	Team	Overall	Conference	Standing	Bowl/playoffs
Worcester State Lancers (Massachusetts State Collegiate Athletic Conference) (2020–2023)
2020–21	No team—COVID-19				
2021	Worcester State	3–7	3–5	7th	
2022	Worcester State	1–9	1–7	8th	
2023	Worcester State	1–9	1–7	8th	
Worcester State:		5–25	5–19		
Total:		5–25			
