= Neil Hattlestad =

American football coach

Biographical details
- Born: c.1940 Decorah, Iowa, U.S.

Coaching career (HC unless noted)
- 1967: Frostburg State

Head coaching record
- Overall: 2–6

Neil W. Hattlestad (born c.1940) is a former American football coach from Decorah, Iowa. He was the second head football coach at Frostburg State University in Frostburg, Maryland, serving for one season, in 1967, and compiling record of 2–6.

In 1970, Hattlestad was named head wrestling and assistant football coach at Dakota State College.

Hattlestad was also chairman of the department of physical education at Sam Houston University, Texas.

In 1983, he was named dean of the College of Fine and Applied Arts and Sciences at the University of Central Arkansas.
