= Mike Davis (American football coach) =

American football coach

Coaching career (HC unless noted)
- 1975–1976: Frostburg State

Head coaching record
- Overall: 1–16

Mike Davis is an American former football coach. He was the fourth head football coach at Frostburg State University in Frostburg, Maryland, serving for two seasons, from 1975 to 1976, and compiling a record of 1–16. He coached for the entire 1975 season and the first seven games of the 1976 season before coaching duties were taken over by Oscar Lewis.
