= Bill Dando =

American football player and coach (1932–2022)

Biographical details
- Born: April 30, 1932; Ashland, Pennsylvania, U.S.
- Died: February 15, 2022 (aged 89); Watkinsville, Georgia, U.S.

Playing career
- 1950–1951: San Francisco
- 1956–1958: Detroit
- Position: Halfback

Coaching career (HC unless noted)
- 1960–1963: John Carroll (assistant)
- 1964: John Carroll
- 1965: SMU (LB)
- 1966–1970: Buffalo (assistant)
- 1977–1989: Buffalo

Head coaching record
- Overall: 63–68–1

William R. Dando (April 30, 1932 – February 15, 2022) was an American college football player and coach. He served as the head football coach at John Carroll University in 1964 and at the University at Buffalo from 1977 to 1989, compiling a career college football record of 63–68–1. Dando began his college playing career at the University of San Francisco. He was a member of the 1951 Dons who were uninvited to a bowl game that year because they had two African American players on the team: Ollie Matson and Burl Toler. The University at Buffalo Alumni Association inducted Coach Dando into the university's Athletic Hall of Fame in 1998. Bill Dando, UB's 19th head football coach, whose commitment to the program and the great athletes and students that he produced are credited with creating the base for the university's rise to Division I-A. When hired as head coach in 1977, Dando had to rebuild a program, at the Division III level, that the university had dissolved at the Division I level in 1970. Among the highlights of Dando's 13 seasons with the Bulls are the 1983 team, which posted a record of 8–2 and whose offense recorded numbers that still stand as UB records, and the 1986 team, which posted a record of 9–2, finishing fifth in the East and 20th in the NCAA Division III poll.

Dando died on February 15, 2022, at the age of 89.

== Head coaching record ==
Year	Team	Overall	Conference	Standing	Bowl/playoffs
John Carroll Blue Streaks (Presidents' Athletic Conference) (1964)
1964	John Carroll	4–4	4–1	2nd	
John Carroll:		4–4	4–1		
Buffalo Bulls (NJCAA independent) (1977)
1977	Buffalo	0–3–1			
Buffalo Bulls (NCAA Division III independent) (1978–1989)
1978	Buffalo	3–6			
1979	Buffalo	4–5			
1980	Buffalo	6–5			
1981	Buffalo	5–5			
1982	Buffalo	5–5			
1983	Buffalo	8–2			
1984	Buffalo	6–4			
1985	Buffalo	4–6			
1986	Buffalo	9–2			
1987	Buffalo	3–7			
1988	Buffalo	2–8			
1989	Buffalo	4–6			
Buffalo:		59–64–1			
Total:		63–68–1			
