= Brien Cullen =

American football coach (born 1955)

Biographical details
- Born: November 30, 1955 (age 70)

Playing career
- 1973–1976: Worcester State

Coaching career (HC unless noted)
- 1983–2019: Worcester State

Head coaching record
- Overall: 181–165
- Bowls: 1–6

Accomplishments and honors

Championships
- 3 NEFC (1995–1997); 2 NEFC South Division (1987–1988); 2 NEFC Bogan Division (2000, 2011)

Awards
- 5× NEFC Coach of the Year (1987, 1993, 1995, 2000, 2011)

Brien A. Cullen (born November 30, 1955) is an American former college football coach. Cullen served as the head coach for the Worcester State Lancers from 1983 to 2019.

== Career ==
Cullen graduated from Worcester State College with a Bachelor of Arts in 1977, and played club football there. In his final season, he captained the squad. He would return to school and complete a Master of Education in 1985.

Cullen was the head coach of Worcester State Club Football team from 1983 to 1984. In his first season, he led the squad to an 8–3 record, and then followed with an undefeated season and a 1984 National Club Championship. Worcester State was upgraded to varsity status in 1985 when they joined the NCAA Division III and then joined the New England Football Conference (NEFC) in the following year. He remained head coach for the Worcester State Lancers until his retirement in 2019, and was succeeded by Adam Peloquin, who played under Cullen from 2009 to 2012.

In 2022, Cullen was inducted into the Worcester State Lancers Hall of Fame.

== Personal life ==
Cullen is married to his wife, Mary, and the couple resides in Westborough, Massachusetts. They have two children: Kelly and Casey. Casey is a 2006 Worcester State graduate, who played and coached football for the Lancers.

== Head coaching record ==
Year	Team	Overall	Conference	Standing	Bowl/playoffs
Worcester State Lancers (NCAA Division III independent) (1985)
1985	Worcester State	5–0			
Worcester State Lancers (New England Football Conference) (1986–2012)
1986	Worcester State	4–5	4–5	7th	
1987	Worcester State	7–2	5–0	1st (South)	
1988	Worcester State	7–3	5–1	1st (South)	
1989	Worcester State	4–5	3–3	T–2nd (South)	
1990	Worcester State	5–4	5–1	2nd (South)	
1991	Worcester State	2–8	2–4	5th	
1992	Worcester State	1–9	1–7	8th	
1993	Worcester State	6–3	5–3	T–3rd	
1994	Worcester State	8–2	6–2	T–3rd	
1995	Worcester State	9–2	8–0	1st	L ECAC Northwest Bowl
1996	Worcester State	10–1	8–0	1st	L ECAC Northeast Bowl
1997	Worcester State	8–3	7–1	T–1st	L ECAC Northeast Bowl
1998	Worcester State	4–6	3–3	4th (Bogan)	
1999	Worcester State	1–9	1–5	6th (Bogan)	
2000	Worcester State	7–2	5–1	T–1st (Bogan)	
2001	Worcester State	10–1	5–1	2nd (Bogan)	W ECAC Northeast Bowl
2002	Worcester State	9–2	5–1	2nd (Bogan)	L ECAC Northeast Bowl
2003	Worcester State	8–3	5–1	2nd (Bogan)	L ECAC Northeast Bowl
2004	Worcester State	6–4	3–3	T–4th (Bogan)	
2005	Worcester State	5–5	3–3	4th (Bogan)	
2006	Worcester State	4–6	3–4	T–4th (Bogan)	
2007	Worcester State	4–6	3–4	T–5th (Bogan)	
2008	Worcester State	2–8	2–5	7th (Bogan)	
2009	Worcester State	1–9	1–6	8th (Bogan)	
2010	Worcester State	5–5	3–4	T–5th (Bogan)	
2011	Worcester State	8–3	6–2	1st (Bogan)	L ECAC Northwest Bowl
2012	Worcester State	6–4	4–4	5th (Bogan)	
Worcester State Lancers (Massachusetts State Collegiate Athletic Conference) (2013–present)
2013	Worcester State	3–7	1–7	T–8th	
2014	Worcester State	7–3	5–3	3rd	
2015	Worcester State	4–6	4–4	T–4th	
2016	Worcester State	3–7	3–5	T–6th	
2017	Worcester State	6–4	5–3	T–3rd	
2018	Worcester State	2–8	1–7	T–8th	
2019	Worcester State	0–10	0–8	9th	
Worcester State:		181–165	130–111		
Total:		181–165			
National championship Conference title Conference division title or championship game berth
