= 1933 Buffalo Bulls football team =

American college football season

1933 Buffalo Bulls football
- Conference: Independent
- Record: 2–3–2
- Head coach: James B. Wilson (2nd season)
- Captain: Bob Rich
- Home stadium: Rotary Field

1933 Eastern college football independents records
	Conf.			Overall
Team	W	L	T	W		L		T
No. 7 Princeton		–		9	–	0	–	0
Duquesne		–		10	–	1	–	0
No. 9 Army		–		9	–	1	–	0
Boston College		–		8	–	1	–	0
Columbia		–		8	–	1	–	0
Pittsburgh		–		8	–	1	–	0
Colgate		–		6	–	1	–	1
Bucknell		–		7	–	2	–	0
Fordham		–		6	–	2	–	0
Tufts		–		6	–	2	–	0
Villanova		–		7	–	2	–	1
Harvard		–		5	–	2	–	1
Drexel		–		5	–	3	–	0
Massachusetts State		–		5	–	3	–	0
Temple		–		5	–	3	–	0
Manhattan		–		5	–	3	–	1
Cornell		–		4	–	3	–	0
Carnegie Tech		–		4	–	3	–	2
La Salle		–		3	–	3	–	2
Syracuse		–		4	–	4	–	0
Yale		–		4	–	4	–	0
Penn State		–		3	–	3	–	1
Brown		–		3	–	5	–	0
Vermont		–		3	–	5	–	0
Franklin & Marshall		–		4	–	5	–	0
NYU		–		2	–	4	–	1
Penn		–		2	–	4	–	1
Northeastern		–		1	–	3	–	1
Boston University		–		2	–	5	–	0
Washington & Jefferson		–		2	–	7	–	1
CCNY		–		1	–	5	–	1
Rankings from Dickinson System

The 1933 Buffalo Bulls football team was an American football team that represented the University at Buffalo as an independent during the 1933 college football season. In its second season under head coach James B. Wilson, the team compiled a 2–3–2 record. The team played its home games at Rotary Field in Buffalo, New York.

== Schedule ==
Date	Opponent	Site	Result	Attendance	Source
September 30	Niagara	Rotary Field; Buffalo, NY	L 0–28	2,300	
October 7	Hamilton	Rotary Field; Buffalo, NY	L 0–15		
October 14	Alfred	Rotary Field; Buffalo, NY	T 12–12		
October 21	Clarkson	Rotary Field; Buffalo, NY	L 0–20		
October 28	Adrian	Rotary Field; Buffalo, NY	W 19–14		
November 4	at Western Reserve	League Park; Cleveland, OH	W 7–6		
November 10	at Hobart	Boswell Field; Geneva, NY	T 0–0		
