= Worcester State Lancers football =

College football team

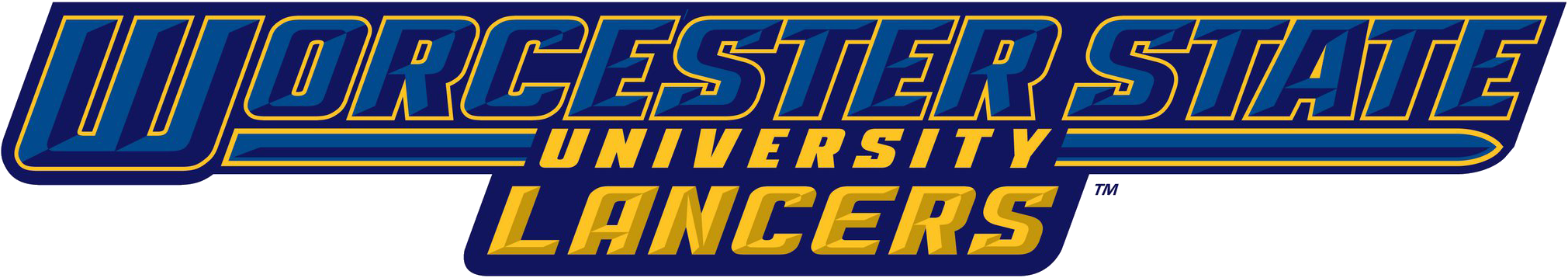
- First season: 1962; 64 years ago
- Athletic director: Michael Mudd
- Head coach: Lazaro Mitjans Jr. 1st season, 3–7 (.300)
- Stadium: John F. Coughlin Field (capacity: 2,500)
- Location: Worcester, Massachusetts
- NCAA division: Division III
- Conference: MASCAC
- All-time record: 185–181 (.505)
- Rivalries: Fitchburg State (Sterling Cup)
- Colors: Blue and gold
- Mascot: Lancer
- Website: wsulancers.com

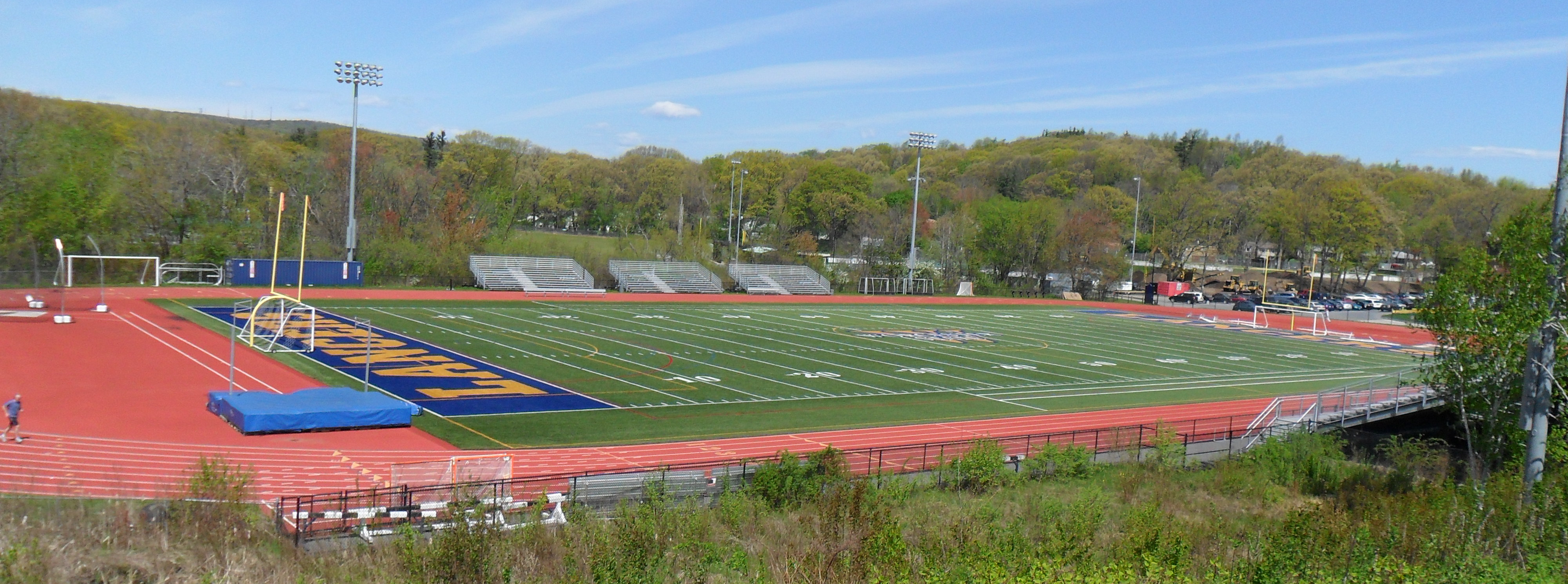
Coughlin Field

The Worcester State Lancers football team represents Worcester State University in college football at the NCAA Division III level. The Lancers are members of the Massachusetts State Collegiate Athletic Conference (MASCAC), fielding its team in the MASCAC since 2013. The Lancers play their home games at John F. Coughlin Field in Worcester, Massachusetts.

Their head coach is Lazaro Mitjans Jr., who took over the position for the 2025 season.

== Conference affiliations ==
- Club team (1969–1984)
- Independent (1985)
- New England Football Conference (1986–2012)
- Massachusetts State Collegiate Athletic Conference (2013–present)

== Championships ==
=== Conference championships ===
Worcester State claims 3 conference titles, the most recent of which came in 1997.

Year	Conference	Overall Record	Conference Record	Coach
1995	New England Football Conference	9–2	8–0	Brien Cullen
1996	New England Football Conference	10–1	8–0	Brien Cullen
1997†	New England Football Conference	8–3	7–1	Brien Cullen

† Co-champions

=== Division championships ===
Worcester State claims 4 division titles, the most recent of which came in 2011.

Year	Division	Coach	Overall Record	Conference Record	Opponent	CG result
1987	NEFC South	Brien Cullen	7–2	5–0	Plymouth State	L 0–40
1988	NEFC South	Brien Cullen	7–3	5–1	Plymouth State	L 0–62
2000†	NEFC Bogan	Brien Cullen	7–2	5–1	N/A lost tiebreaker to Bridgewater State	
2011†	NEFC Bogan	Brien Cullen	8–3	6–2	N/A lost tiebreaker to Framingham State	

† Co-champions

== Postseason games ==
=== Bowl games ===
Worcester State has participated in seven bowl games, and has a record of 1–6.

Season	Coach	Bowl	Opponent	Result
1995	Brien Cullen	ECAC Bowl	RPI	L 12–69
1996	Brien Cullen	ECAC Bowl	Ithaca	L 21–27
1997	Brien Cullen	ECAC Bowl	RPI	L 13–14
2001	Brien Cullen	ECAC Bowl	Curry	W 36–35
2002	Brien Cullen	ECAC Bowl	RPI	L 29–55
2003	Brien Cullen	ECAC Bowl	UMass Dartmouth	L 7–21
2011	Brien Cullen	ECAC Bowl	Salve Regina	L 6–26

== List of head coaches ==
=== Key ===
Key to symbols in coaches list
General		Overall		Conference		Postseason (Note: Although the first Rose Bowl Game was played in 1902, it has been continuously played since the 1916 game, and is recognized as the oldest bowl game by the NCAA. "—" indicates any season prior to 1916 when postseason games were not played.)	
No.	Order of coaches (Note: A running total of the number of head coaches, with coaches who served separate tenures being counted only once. Interim head coaches are represented with "Int" and are not counted in the running total. "—" indicates the team played but either without a coach or no coach is on record. "X" indicates an interim year without play.)	GC	Games coached	CW	Conference wins	PW	Postseason wins
DC	Division championships	OW	Overall wins	CL	Conference losses	PL	Postseason losses
CC	Conference championships	OL	Overall losses	CT	Conference ties	PT	Postseason ties
NC	National championships	OT	Overall ties (Note: Overtime rules in college football were introduced in 1996, making ties impossible in the period since.)	C%	Conference winning percentage		
†	Elected to the College Football Hall of Fame	O%	Overall winning percentage (Note: When computing the win–loss percentage, a tie counts as half a win and half a loss.)				

=== Coaches ===
List of head football coaches showing season(s) coached, overall records, conference records, postseason records, championships and selected awards
No.	Name	Season(s)	GC	OW	OL	OT	O%	CW	CL	CT	C%	PW	PL	PT	DC	CC	NC	Awards
1	Brien Cullen	1985–2019	346	181	165	0	0.523	130	111	0	0.539	1	6	0	3	6	0	5× NEFC Coach of the Year (1987, 1993, 1995, 2000, 2011)
2	Adam Peloquin	2020–present	20	4	16	0	0.200	4	12	0	0.250	0	0	0	0	0	0	–

== Year-by-year results ==
National champions	Conference champions	Bowl game berth	Playoff berth

Season	Year	Head Coach	Association	Division	Conference	Record							Postseason	Final ranking
Season	Year	Head Coach	Association	Division	Conference	Overall			Conference				Postseason	Final ranking
Season	Year	Head Coach	Association	Division	Conference	Win	Loss	Tie	Finish	Win	Loss	Tie	Postseason	Final ranking
Worcester State Lancers
1983	1983	Brien Cullen	Club team											
1984	1984	Brien Cullen	Club team											
1985	1985	Brien Cullen	NCAA	Division III	Independent	5	0	0	—	—	—	—	—	—
1986	1986	Brien Cullen	NCAA	Division III	NEFC	4	5	0	7th	4	5	0	—	—
1987	1987	Brien Cullen	NCAA	Division III	NEFC	7	2	0	1st (South)	5	0	0	Conference champions	—
1988	1988	Brien Cullen	NCAA	Division III	NEFC	7	3	0	1st (South)	5	1	0	Conference champions	—
1989	1989	Brien Cullen	NCAA	Division III	NEFC	4	5	0	T–2nd (South)	3	3	0	—	—
1990	1990	Brien Cullen	NCAA	Division III	NEFC	5	4	0	2nd (South)	5	1	0	—	—
1991	1991	Brien Cullen	NCAA	Division III	NEFC	2	8	0	5th	2	4	0	—	—
1992	1992	Brien Cullen	NCAA	Division III	NEFC	1	9	0	8th	1	7	0	—	—
1993	1993	Brien Cullen	NCAA	Division III	NEFC	6	3	0	T–3rd	5	3	0	—	—
1994	1994	Brien Cullen	NCAA	Division III	NEFC	8	2	0	T–3rd	6	2	0	—	—
1995	1995	Brien Cullen	NCAA	Division III	NEFC	9	2	0	1st	8	0	0	L ECAC Northeast Bowl	—
1996	1996	Brien Cullen	NCAA	Division III	NEFC	10	1	0	1st	8	0	0	L ECAC Northeast Bowl	—
1997	1997	Brien Cullen	NCAA	Division III	NEFC	8	3	0	T–1st	7	1	0	L ECAC Northeast Bowl	—
1998	1998	Brien Cullen	NCAA	Division III	NEFC	4	6	0	4th (Bogan)	3	3	0	—	—
1999	1999	Brien Cullen	NCAA	Division III	NEFC	1	9	0	6th (Bogan)	1	5	0	—	—
2000	2000	Brien Cullen	NCAA	Division III	NEFC	7	2	0	T–1st (Bogan)	5	1	0	Conference champions	—
2001	2001	Brien Cullen	NCAA	Division III	NEFC	10	1	0	2nd (Bogan)	5	1	0	W ECAC Northeast Bowl	—
2002	2002	Brien Cullen	NCAA	Division III	NEFC	9	2	0	2nd (Bogan)	5	1	0	L ECAC Northeast Bowl	—
2003	2003	Brien Cullen	NCAA	Division III	NEFC	8	3	0	2nd (Bogan)	5	1	0	L ECAC Northeast Bowl	—
2004	2004	Brien Cullen	NCAA	Division III	NEFC	6	4	0	T–4th (Bogan)	3	3	0	—	—
2005	2005	Brien Cullen	NCAA	Division III	NEFC	5	5	0	4th (Bogan)	3	3	0	—	—
2006	2006	Brien Cullen	NCAA	Division III	NEFC	4	6	0	T–4th (Bogan)	3	4	0	—	—
2007	2007	Brien Cullen	NCAA	Division III	NEFC	4	6	0	T–4th (Bogan)	3	4	0	—	—
2008	2008	Brien Cullen	NCAA	Division III	NEFC	2	8	0	7th (Bogan)	2	5	0	—	—
2009	2009	Brien Cullen	NCAA	Division III	NEFC	1	9	0	8th (Bogan)	1	6	0	—	—
2010	2010	Brien Cullen	NCAA	Division III	NEFC	5	5	0	T–4th (Bogan)	3	4	0	—	—
2011	2011	Brien Cullen	NCAA	Division III	NEFC	8	3	0	1st (Bogan)	6	2	0	L ECAC Northwest Bowl	—
2012	2012	Brien Cullen	NCAA	Division III	NEFC	6	4	0	5th (Bogan)	4	4	0	—	—
2013	2013	Brien Cullen	NCAA	Division III	MASCAC	3	7	0	T–8th	1	7	0	—	—
2014	2014	Brien Cullen	NCAA	Division III	MASCAC	7	3	0	3rd	5	3	0	—	—
2015	2015	Brien Cullen	NCAA	Division III	MASCAC	4	6	0	T–4th	4	4	0	—	—
2016	2016	Brien Cullen	NCAA	Division III	MASCAC	3	7	0	T–6th	3	5	0	—	—
2017	2017	Brien Cullen	NCAA	Division III	MASCAC	6	4	0	T–3rd	5	3	0	—	—
2018	2018	Brien Cullen	NCAA	Division III	MASCAC	2	8	0	T–8th	1	7	0	—	—
2019	2019	Brien Cullen	NCAA	Division III	MASCAC	0	10	0	9th	0	8	0	—	—
Season canceled due to COVID-19
2021	2021	Adam Peloquin	NCAA	Division III	MASCAC	3	7	0	7th	3	5	0	—	—
2022	2022	Adam Peloquin	NCAA	Division III	MASCAC	1	9	0	8th	1	7	0		
2023	2023	Zach Besaw	NCAA	Division III	MASCAC	3	7	0	8th	3	6	0	—	—
