= Lazaro Mitjans Jr. =

American football coach (born c. 1997)

Current position
- Title: Head coach
- Team: Worcester State
- Conference: MASCAC
- Record: 3–7

Biographical details
- Born: c. 1997 (age 28–29); Ashland, Massachusetts, U.S.
- Education: University of Massachusetts Amherst (2019)

Coaching career (HC unless noted)
- 2016–2018: UMass (SA)
- 2019: Massachusetts Maritime (ST/RB)
- 2020: Massachusetts Maritime (OC/WR)
- 2021: Harvard (OQC)
- 2022: Amherst (WR)
- 2023–2024: Harvard (RB)
- 2025–present: Worcester State

Head coaching record
- Overall: 3–7

Lazaro Mitjans Jr. (born c. 1997) is an American college football coach. He is the head football coach for Worcester State University, a position he has held since 2025. He also coached for UMass, Massachusetts Maritime, Harvard, and Amherst.

Mitjans Jr. father, Mitjans Sr., was a high school football coach in Massachusetts and Mitjans Jr.'s twin brother, Antonio, played college football for UMass Dartmouth.

== Head coaching record ==
Year	Team	Overall	Conference	Standing	Bowl/playoffs
Worcester State Lancers (Massachusetts State Collegiate Athletic Conference) (2025–present)
2025	Worcester State	3–7	3–6	T–7th	
2026	Worcester State	0–0	0–0		
Worcester State:		3–7	3–6		
Total:		3–7			
