= James B. Wilson =

American football player and coach (1896–1986)

Biographical details
- Born: July 8, 1896; Buffalo, New York, U.S.
- Died: September 25, 1986 (aged 90); Clarence, New York, U.S.

Playing career
- 1919: Cornell
- 1922: Buffalo All-Americans
- Position: End

Coaching career (HC unless noted)
- 1932–1933: Buffalo
- 1934–1938: Canisius (freshmen)
- 1939–1942: Canisius
- 1948–1949: Canisius
- 1950–1951: Buffalo

Head coaching record
- Overall: 40–30–7
- Bowls: 0–1

Accomplishments and honors

Awards
- 4 Western New York Little Three (1939, 1941, 1948–1949)

James Bentley Wilson (July 8, 1896 – September 25, 1986) was an American football player and coach. He served as the head football coach at the University at Buffalo from 1932 to 1933 and again from 1950 to 1951 and at Canisius College from 1939 to 1942 and again from 1948 to 1949, compiling a career college football record of 40–30–7.

== Head coaching record ==
Year	Team	Overall	Conference	Standing	Bowl/playoffs
Buffalo Bulls (New York State Conference) (1932–1933)
1932	Buffalo	1–5–1			
1933	Buffalo	2–3–2			
Canisius Golden Griffins (Western New York Little Three Conference) (1939–1942)
1939	Canisius	4–1–1	2–0	1st	
1940	Canisius	5–3	1–1	2nd	
1941	Canisius	3–4–1	1–1	T–1st	
1942	Canisius	4–3–1	1–0		
Canisius Golden Griffins (Western New York Little Three Conference) (1948–1949)
1948	Canisius	7–2–1	2–0	1st	L Great Lakes
1949	Canisius	5–2	1–1	T–1st	
Canisius:		28–15–4	8–3		
Buffalo Bulls (Independent) (1950–1951)
1950	Buffalo	5–3			
1951	Buffalo	4–4			
Buffalo:		12–15–3			
Total:		40–30–7			
National championship Conference title Conference division title or championship game berth
