= 1985 NCAA Division III football season =

American college football season

- Regular season: August – November 1985
- Playoffs: November – December 1985
- National championship: Garrett-Harrison Stadium; Phenix City, AL
- Champion: Augustana (IL)

The 1985 NCAA Division III football season, part of college football in the United States organized by the National Collegiate Athletic Association at the Division III level, began in August 1985, and concluded with the NCAA Division III Football Championship, also known as the Stagg Bowl, in December 1985 at Garrett-Harrison Stadium in Phenix City, Alabama. The Augustana (IL) Vikings won the third of their four consecutive Division III championships by defeating the Ithaca Bombers by a final score of 20−7.

== Conference changes and new programs ==
- The Metropolitan Intercollegiate Conference ceased operations prior to the 1985 season. Two of its members joined the newly formed Liberty Football Conference while three became independent.
- Ferrum College, formerly known as Ferrum Junior College, fielded a four-year team for the first time.
- Worcester State and Villanova each fielded a provisional team that played half a season. Worcester State had started a club program in 1969 and were playing varsity for the first time, while Villanova had cut their football program in 1981 and were reviving it.

School	1984 Conference	1985 Conference
Brooklyn	Metropolitan	D-III Independent
C.W. Post	D-II Independent	Liberty
Ferrum	NJCAA	D-III Independent
Fordham	D-III Independent	Liberty
Gallaudet	Revived Program	D-III Independent
Lebanon Valley	D-III Independent	MAC
Iona	D-III Independent	Liberty
MacMurray	New Program	D-III Independent
Marist	Metropolitan	D-III Independent
Maritime	Club Program	D-III Independent
Merchant Marine	D-III Independent	Liberty
Pace	Metropolitan	Liberty
Principia	D-III Independent	IBFC (NAIA)
St. John's	Metropolitan	Liberty
Saint Peter's	Metropolitan	Independent
Villanova	Revived program	D-III independent
Worcester State	Club program	D-III Independent

== Conference standings ==
1985 Centennial Conference football standings
	Conf.					Overall
Team	W		L		T	W		L		T
Gettysburg $^	6	–	0	–	1	11	–	1	–	1
Franklin & Marshall	5	–	1	–	1	7	–	2	–	1
Muhlenberg	5	–	2	–	0	7	–	3	–	0
Johns Hopkins	4	–	3	–	0	6	–	3	–	0
Ursinus	3	–	4	–	0	5	–	4	–	0
Swarthmore	3	–	4	–	0	4	–	5	–	0
Dickinson	1	–	6	–	0	1	–	8	–	0
Western Maryland	0	–	7	–	0	0	–	9	–	0
$ – Conference champion; ^ – NCAA Division III playoff participant

1985 College Athletic Conference football standings
	Conf.					Overall
Team	W		L		T	W		L		T
Rhodes +	3	–	1	–	0	8	–	1	–	1
Centre +	3	–	1	–	0	6	–	3	–	0
Rose–Hulman	2	–	2	–	0	4	–	5	–	0
Sewanee	2	–	2	–	0	4	–	5	–	0
Earlham	0	–	4	–	0	0	–	9	–	0
+ – Conference co-champions

1985 College Conference of Illinois and Wisconsin football standings
	Conf.					Overall
Team	W		L		T	W		L		T
Augustana (IL) $^	8	–	0	–	0	13	–	0	–	0
Elmhurst	6	–	2	–	0	7	–	2	–	0
Millikin	6	–	2	–	0	7	–	2	–	0
Wheaton (IL)	6	–	2	–	0	6	–	3	–	0
Illinois Wesleyan	3	–	5	–	0	3	–	6	–	0
North Central (IL)	2	–	6	–	0	3	–	6	–	0
Carroll (WI)	2	–	6	–	0	2	–	7	–	0
North Park	2	–	6	–	0	2	–	7	–	0
Carthage	1	–	7	–	0	1	–	8	–	0
$ – Conference champion; ^ – NCAA Division III playoff participant

1985 Independent College Athletic Conference football standings
	Conf.					Overall
Team	W		L		T	W		L		T
Ithaca $^	3	–	0	–	0	11	–	2	–	0
St. Lawrence	3	–	1	–	0	6	–	4	–	0
RPI	1	–	1	–	0	3	–	6	–	0
Hobart	1	–	3	–	0	5	–	4	–	0
Alfred	0	–	3	–	0	5	–	5	–	0
$ – Conference champion; ^ – NCAA Division III playoff participant

1985 Iowa Conference football standings
	Conf.					Overall
Team	W		L		T	W		L		T
Central (IA) $^	7	–	0	–	0	11	–	1	–	0
Wartburg	6	–	1	–	0	7	–	3	–	0
Luther	4	–	3	–	0	5	–	5	–	0
Dubuque *	4	–	3	–	0	4	–	6	–	0
Buena Vista *	2	–	5	–	0	4	–	6	–	0
William Penn	2	–	5	–	0	4	–	6	–	0
Simpson (IA)	2	–	5	–	0	2	–	7	–	0
Upper Iowa	1	–	6	–	0	1	–	9	–	0
$ – Conference champion; ^ – NCAA Division III playoff participant; * – Dubuque forfeited their game against Buena Vista, but it is not reflected in the final standings.

1985 Liberty Football Conference standings
	Conf.					Overall
Team	W		L		T	W		L		T
Merchant Marine $	5	–	0	–	0	8	–	3	–	0
C. W. Post	4	–	1	–	0	7	–	2	–	0
Fordham	2	–	3	–	0	6	–	5	–	0
St. John's	2	–	3	–	0	5	–	5	–	0
Pace	2	–	3	–	0	3	–	7	–	0
Iona	0	–	5	–	0	0	–	11	–	0
$ – Conference champion

1985 Michigan Intercollegiate Athletic Association football standings
	Conf.					Overall
Team	W		L		T	W		L		T
Albion $^	4	–	0	–	1	7	–	2	–	1
Adrian	4	–	1	–	0	6	–	3	–	0
Hope	3	–	1	–	1	5	–	3	–	1
Alma	2	–	3	–	0	5	–	4	–	0
Kalamazoo	1	–	4	–	0	1	–	8	–	0
Olivet	0	–	5	–	0	0	–	9	–	0
$ – Conference champion; ^ – NCAA Division III playoff participant

1985 Middle Atlantic Conference football standings
	Conf.					Overall
Team	W		L		T	W		L		T
Lycoming $^	9	–	0	–	0	10	–	1	–	0
Juniata	7	–	2	–	0	8	–	3	–	0
Moravian	6	–	3	–	0	7	–	3	–	0
Widener	6	–	3	–	0	7	–	3	–	0
Delaware Valley	6	–	3	–	0	6	–	4	–	0
Wilkes	4	–	5	–	0	4	–	6	–	0
Susquehanna	3	–	6	–	0	3	–	7	–	0
Albright	2	–	7	–	0	2	–	7	–	0
Upsala	2	–	7	–	0	3	–	8	–	0
Lebanon Valley	0	–	9	–	0	0	–	10	–	0
$ – Conference champion; ^ – NCAA Division III playoff participant

1985 Midwest Conference football standings
	Conf.					Overall
Team	W		L		T	W		L		T
North Division
St. Norbert xy+	6	–	1	–	0	6	–	2	–	1
Lawrence	5	–	2	–	0	7	–	2	–	0
Beloit	3	–	4	–	0	5	–	4	–	0
Chicago	3	–	4	–	0	5	–	4	–	0
Lake Forest	3	–	4	–	0	5	–	4	–	0
Ripon	2	–	5	–	0	2	–	7	–	0
South Division
Coe xy+^	7	–	0	–	0	9	–	1	–	1
Cornell (IA)	6	–	1	–	0	8	–	1	–	0
Grinnell	3	–	4	–	0	3	–	5	–	0
Knox	2	–	5	–	0	2	–	7	–	0
Monmouth (IL)	1	–	6	–	0	2	–	7	–	0
Illinois College	1	–	6	–	0	1	–	8	–	0
Championship: Coe 7, St. Norbert 7
+ – Conference co-champions; x – Division champion/co-champions; y – Championship game participant; ^ – NCAA Division III playoff participant

1985 Minnesota Intercollegiate Athletic Conference football standings
	Conf.					Overall
Team	W		L		T	W		L		T
Saint John's (MN) $^	8	–	1	–	0	8	–	2	–	0
Concordia–Moorhead	7	–	2	–	0	7	–	3	–	0
St. Thomas (MN)	7	–	2	–	0	7	–	3	–	0
Macalester	5	–	4	–	0	6	–	4	–	0
Carleton	4	–	5	–	0	5	–	5	–	0
Hamline	4	–	5	–	0	4	–	6	–	0
St. Olaf	4	–	5	–	0	4	–	6	–	0
Gustavus Adolphus	3	–	6	–	0	3	–	7	–	0
Bethel (MN)	2	–	6	–	1	2	–	7	–	1
Augsburg	0	–	8	–	1	1	–	8	–	1
$ – Conference champion; ^ – NCAA Division III playoff participant

1985 New England Football Conference standings
	Conf.					Overall
Team	W		L		T	W		L		T
Western Connecticut State +^	8	–	1	–	0	10	–	2	–	0
Plymouth State +	8	–	1	–	0	8	–	3	–	0
Bridgewater State	5	–	4	–	0	5	–	4	–	0
Maine Maritime	4	–	4	–	0	4	–	4	–	0
Massachusetts Maritime	4	–	4	–	0	5	–	4	–	1
Curry	4	–	5	–	0	4	–	5	–	0
Westfield State	4	–	5	–	0	4	–	5	–	0
Framingham State	3	–	6	–	0	3	–	6	–	0
Western New England	2	–	6	–	0	2	–	6	–	0
Nichols	1	–	7	–	0	1	–	7	–	0
+ – Conference co-champions; ^ – NCAA Division III playoff participant

1985 New England Small College Athletic Conference football standings
	Conf.					Overall
Team	W		L		T	W		L		T
Amherst	7	–	1	–	0	7	–	1	–	0
Hamilton	5	–	1	–	0	6	–	2	–	0
Trinity (CT)	4	–	3	–	0	5	–	3	–	0
Bowdoin	4	–	3	–	0	5	–	3	–	0
Middlebury	3	–	3	–	0	3	–	5	–	0
Tufts	3	–	3	–	1	3	–	4	–	1
Wesleyan	3	–	4	–	0	4	–	4	–	0
Bates	2	–	5	–	0	3	–	5	–	0
Williams	2	–	5	–	1	2	–	5	–	1
Colby	0	–	6	–	0	0	–	8	–	0
The NESCAC did not recognize an official conference champion until 2000

1985 New Jersey Athletic Conference football standings
	Conf.					Overall
Team	W		L		T	W		L		T
Montclair State $^	6	–	0	–	0	10	–	2	–	0
Trenton State	4	–	2	–	0	6	–	4	–	0
Glassboro State	4	–	2	–	0	5	–	5	–	0
Jersey City State	3	–	3	–	0	6	–	4	–	0
William Paterson	3	–	3	–	0	5	–	5	–	0
Kean	1	–	5	–	0	3	–	7	–	0
Ramapo	0	–	6	–	0	0	–	10	–	0
$ – Conference champion; ^ – NCAA Division III playoff participant

1985 North Coast Athletic Conference football standings
	Conf.					Overall
Team	W		L		T	W		L		T
Denison $^	6	–	0	–	0	10	–	1	–	0
Case Western Reserve	5	–	1	–	0	7	–	2	–	0
Kenyon	4	–	2	–	0	4	–	6	–	0
Wooster	2	–	4	–	0	3	–	6	–	0
Oberlin	2	–	4	–	0	3	–	7	–	0
Allegheny	1	–	5	–	0	3	–	7	–	0
Ohio Wesleyan	1	–	5	–	0	2	–	7	–	1
$ – Conference champion; ^ – NCAA Division III playoff participant

1985 Ohio Athletic Conference football standings
	Conf.					Overall
Team	W		L		T	W		L		T
Mount Union $^	8	–	0	–	0	11	–	1	–	0
Baldwin–Wallace	7	–	1	–	0	8	–	2	–	0
Muskingum	5	–	3	–	0	7	–	3	–	0
Wittenberg	5	–	3	–	0	6	–	3	–	0
Heidelberg	4	–	4	–	0	6	–	4	–	0
Capital	3	–	5	–	0	5	–	5	–	0
Marietta	3	–	5	–	0	4	–	6	–	0
Ohio Northern	1	–	7	–	0	1	–	9	–	0
Otterbein	0	–	8	–	0	0	–	10	–	0
$ – Conference champion; ^ – NCAA Division III playoff participant

1985 Old Dominion Athletic Conference football standings
	Conf.					Overall
Team	W		L		T	W		L		T
Washington and Lee +	4	–	1	–	0	7	–	2	–	0
Emory & Henry +	4	–	1	–	0	8	–	3	–	0
Randolph–Macon +	4	–	1	–	0	7	–	3	–	0
Hampden–Sydney	2	–	3	–	0	5	–	5	–	0
Bridgewater	1	–	4	–	0	3	–	7	–	0
Maryville (TN)	0	–	5	–	0	1	–	8	–	0
+ – Conference co-champions

1985 Presidents' Athletic Conference football standings
	Conf.					Overall
Team	W		L		T	W		L		T
Carnegie Mellon $^	6	–	0	–	0	8	–	1	–	0
Washington & Jefferson	5	–	1	–	0	8	–	1	–	0
Hiram	3	–	3	–	0	4	–	5	–	0
Grove City	2	–	4	–	0	4	–	5	–	0
Thiel	2	–	4	–	0	4	–	5	–	0
John Carroll	2	–	4	–	0	2	–	7	–	0
Bethany (WV)	1	–	5	–	0	1	–	8	–	0
$ – Conference champion; ^ – NCAA Division III playoff participant

1985 Southern California Intercollegiate Athletic Conference football standings
	Conf.					Overall
Team	W		L		T	W		L		T
Occidental $^	5	–	0	–	0	9	–	2	–	0
Whittier	3	–	1	–	1	7	–	3	–	0
Redlands	3	–	2	–	0	4	–	6	–	0
La Verne	2	–	3	–	0	4	–	5	–	0
Pomona-Pitzer	1	–	4	–	0	1	–	8	–	0
Claremont-Mudd	0	–	4	–	1	1	–	8	–	0
$ – Conference champion; ^ – NCAA Division III playoff participant; Each team played two other conference members twice. A head-to-head sweep of the two games counted as one win for the winner and one loss for the loser in the conference standings. A split of the two games counted as a tie for each team.

1985 Southern Intercollegiate Athletic Conference football standings
	Conf.					Overall
Team	W		L		T	W		L		T
Division II
No. 6 Fort Valley State x^	5	–	1	–	0	9	–	3	–	0
No. 12 Albany State x	5	–	1	–	0	9	–	2	–	0
Morris Brown	4	–	2	–	0	5	–	5	–	0
Tuskegee	2	–	3	–	1	3	–	6	–	1
Savannah State	2	–	4	–	0	2	–	9	–	0
Morehouse	1	–	4	–	1	3	–	6	–	1
Clark	1	–	5	–	0	2	–	6	–	0
Alabama A&M *	0	–	0	–	0	3	–	7	–	1
Division III
Miles x	3	–	1	–	0	3	–	8	–	0
Lane	1	–	2	–	0	3	–	5	–	1
Knoxville	1	–	2	–	0	5	–	5	–	0
+ – Conference co-champions; ^ – NCAA Division II playoff participant; * - Alabama A&M was ineligible for the conference title due to not scheduling enough conference games. Games against Alabama A&M did not count as conference games.; Rankings from NCAA Division II Football Committee poll

1985 Wisconsin State University Conference football standings
	Conf.					Overall
Team	W		L		T	W		L		T
Wisconsin–River Falls $	6	–	1	–	1	8	–	1	–	1
No. 8 Wisconsin–La Crosse ^	5	–	1	–	2	11	–	1	–	2
Wisconsin–Stevens Point	5	–	2	–	1	8	–	2	–	1
Wisconsin–Platteville	5	–	3	–	0	5	–	5	–	0
Wisconsin–Eau Claire	3	–	4	–	1	5	–	4	–	1
Wisconsin–Whitewater	3	–	4	–	1	3	–	7	–	1
Wisconsin–Oshkosh	2	–	5	–	1	4	–	5	–	1
Wisconsin–Stout	2	–	6	–	0	3	–	7	–	0
Wisconsin–Superior	1	–	6	–	1	2	–	8	–	1
$ – Conference champion; * – NAIA Division II playoff participant; Rankings from NAIA Division II poll

1985 NCAA Division III independents football records
	Conf.			Overall
Team	W	L	T	W		L		T
Villanova		–		5	–	0	–	0
Worcester State		–		5	–	0	–	0
Union (NY) ^		–		9	–	1	–	0
Millsaps		–		7	–	1	–	1
Salisbury State ^		–		10	–	2	–	0
Albany		–		9	–	2	–	0
Wagner		–		9	–	2	–	0
DePauw		–		8	–	2	–	0
Mercyhurst		–		8	–	2	–	0
Wabash		–		7	–	2	–	1
Canisius		–		6	–	2	–	1
Dayton		–		7	–	3	–	0
Marist		–		5	–	3	–	0
Frostburg State		–		6	–	4	–	0
Stony Brook		–		6	–	4	–	0
Fairleigh Dickinson–Florham		–		5	–	4	–	0
Georgetown		–		5	–	4	–	0
Ferrum		–		6	–	5	–	0
Norwich		–		5	–	5	–	0
Gallaudet		–		5	–	5	–	0
WPI		–		4	–	4	–	0
Cortland		–		4	–	5	–	0
Buffalo		–		4	–	6	–	0
Hofstra		–		4	–	6	–	0
Bishop		–		4	–	7	–	1
San Diego		–		3	–	5	–	0
Duquesne		–		3	–	6	–	0
MacMurray		–		2	–	4	–	0
Saint Peter's		–		2	–	5	–	0
Brooklyn		–		2	–	6	–	0
Lowell		–		3	–	7	–	0
Washington (MO)		–		3	–	7	–	0
Buffalo State		–		2	–	7	–	0
Rochester (NY)		–		2	–	7	–	0
Samford		–		2	–	8	–	0
Catholic University		–		2	–	9	–	0
Brockport		–		1	–	9	–	1
Fitchburg State		–		1	–	7	–	0
Colorado College		–		1	–	8	–	0
Maritime		–		1	–	8	–	0
Saint Francis (PA)		–		0	–	9	–	0
^ – NCAA Division III playoff participant

== Conference champions ==
Conference champions
- Centennial Conference – Gettysburg
- College Athletic Conference – Centre and Rhodes
- College Conference of Illinois and Wisconsin – Augustana (IL)
- Independent College Athletic Conference – Ithaca
- Iowa Intercollegiate Athletic Conference – Central (IA)
- Michigan Intercollegiate Athletic Association – Albion
- Middle Atlantic Conference – Lycoming
- Midwest Collegiate Athletic Conference – Coe
- Minnesota Intercollegiate Athletic Conference – Saint John's (MN)
- New England Football Conference – Plymouth State and Western Connecticut State
- New Jersey State Athletic Conference – Montclair State
- North Coast Athletic Conference – Denison
- Ohio Athletic Conference – Mount Union
- Old Dominion Athletic Conference – Emory & Henry, Randolph-Macon, and Washington & Lee
- Presidents' Athletic Conference – Carnegie Mellon
- Southern California Intercollegiate Athletic Conference – Occidental
- Southern Intercollegiate Athletic Conference - Miles
- Texas Intercollegiate Athletic Association – Austin and Sul Ross
- Upper Midwest Athletic Conference – Mount Senario
- Wisconsin Intercollegiate Athletic Conference – Wisconsin–River Falls

== Postseason ==
The 1985 NCAA Division III Football Championship playoffs were the 13th annual single-elimination tournament to determine the national champion of men's NCAA Division III college football. The championship Stagg Bowl game was held at Garrett-Harrison Stadium in Phenix City, Alabama for the eleventh year and first time since 1982. This was the first tournament to feature sixteen teams after expanding from the eight team model in place since 1975.

=== Playoff bracket ===
First Round; Campus Sites
Ithaca	13
Union (NY)	12
Montclair State	28
Western Connecticut State	0
Salisbury State	35
Carnegie Mellon	22
Gettysburg	14
Lycoming	10
Augustana (IL)	26
Albion	10
Mount Union	35
Denison	3
Central (IA)	27
Coe	7
Occidental	28
Saint John's (MN)	10

Quarterfinals; Campus Sites
Ithaca	50
Montclair State	28
Salisbury State	6
Gettysburg	22
Augustana (IL)	21
Mount Union	14
Central (IA)	71
Occidental	0

Semifinals; Campus Sites
Ithaca	34
Gettysburg	0
Augustana (IL)	14
Central (IA)	7

National Championship Game; Garrett-Harrison Stadium; Phenix City, Alabama
Ithaca	7
Augustana (IL)	20

== See also ==
- 1985 NCAA Division I-A football season
- 1985 NCAA Division I-AA football season
- 1985 NCAA Division II football season
