= Rotary Field =

Athletics stadium in Buffalo, New York

- Location within the State of New York Location within the United States
- Former names: University of Buffalo Field
- Location: Bailey and Winspear avenues, Buffalo, New York
- Coordinates: 42°57′00″N 78°48′53″W
- Owner: University at Buffalo
- Operator: University at Buffalo

Construction
- Opened: October 9, 1920

Tenant
- Buffalo Bulls (NCAA)

Rotary Field is a field and former athletics stadium in Buffalo, New York, on the South Campus of the University at Buffalo. It was the home field for the Buffalo Bulls football teams from 1920 to 1942, and again from 1955 to 1984.

The field at Bailey Avenue and Winspear Avenue, on the southeastern corner of UB's South Campus, opened with UB's season opener against Thiel College on October 9, 1920.

The field was initially known simply as University of Buffalo Field, until the Buffalo chapter of Rotary International donated $250,000 "for the creation of a proper athletic field or stadium, and that the same shall be known as Rotary Field." Construction of bleachers with a capacity of 7,500 at Rotary Field was completed in time for the next year's season opener, another Buffalo-Thiel game, on October 8, 1921.

Rotary Field continued to serve as the Bulls' home field until 1942, when the program was suspended because of World War II. When the University of Buffalo resumed intercollegiate athletics in 1946, home games were played at Civic Stadium, the home of the NCAA's Canisius Golden Griffins and future home of the NFL's Buffalo Bills.

After drawing lackluster crowds at the 40,000-capacity NFL-sized stadium – "at some recent games, fewer than 1,000 persons have rattled around in Civic Stadium as Buffalo's team lost repeatedly", the Associated Press reported in 1954 – the University of Buffalo decided to move its football team back to the campus grounds for 1955, though for the next few years, a few home games were held at Civic Stadium.

Rotary Field served as the principal home of the Bulls until 1970, as the university dropped its football team after the end of that season. The college president noted at the time that the 12,000-person capacity stadium "had never been filled for a home game in the past decade." The sport was reinstated in 1977, again with Rotary Field as the Bulls' home turf.

The Bulls enjoyed five consecutive winning seasons at Rotary Field, 1980 to 1984, before moving to the university's North Campus in Amherst, New York, to play their home games in UB Stadium, now known as Kunz Stadium. This field, in turn, was succeeded by the present-day University at Buffalo Stadium in 1993.

The site of Rotary Field is now an open field and parking lot on the UB South Campus, across the street from the Veterans Administration Medical Center in Buffalo.
