= Canisius Golden Griffins football =

College football team of Canisius University

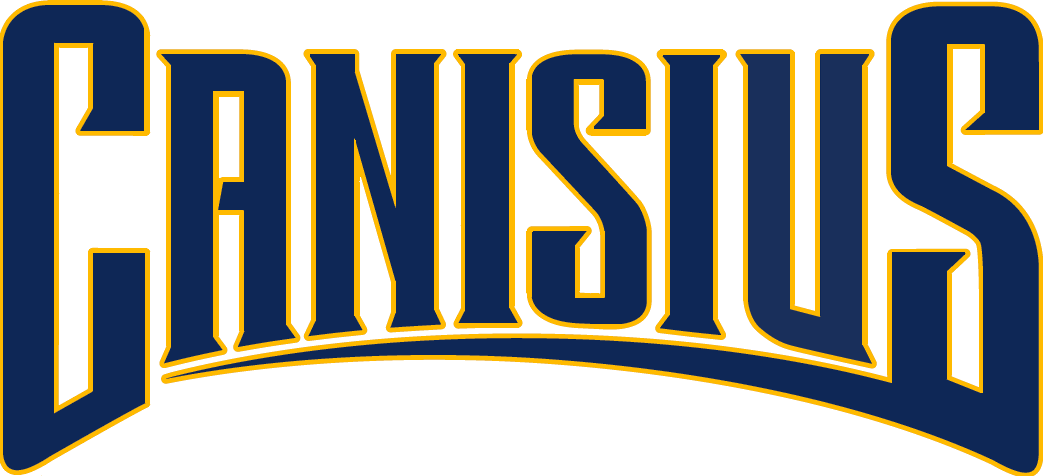
- First season: 1918; 108 years ago
- Last season: 2002; 24 years ago
- Location: Buffalo, New York
- Stadium: Demske Field (capacity: 1,200)
- NCAA division: Division I-AA
- Conference: Metro Atlantic Athletic Conference
- Colors: Blue and gold
- All-time record: 241–251–26 (.490)
- Bowl record: 0–1 (.000)

National championships
- Claimed: 0

Conference championships
- 7
- Rivalries: Buffalo Bulls; Duquesne Dukes; Georgetown Hoyas; Marist Red Foxes; Niagara Purple Eagles; St. Bonaventure Brown Indians

The Canisius Golden Griffins football program are the intercollegiate American football team for Canisius University located in Buffalo, New York. The team competed in the NCAA Division I-AA and were members of the Metro Atlantic Athletic Conference. The school's first football team was fielded in 1918. Canisius participated in football from 1918 to 1949, and again from 1975 to 2002, compiling an all-time record of 241–251–26. At the conclusion of the 2002 season, the Canisius football program was discontinued, along with seven other school athletic programs, as part of an effort to overhaul and streamline the school's athletic department.

== Notable former players ==
Notable alumni include:

- Tommy Colella: Defensive back, Detroit Lions 1942–43, Cleveland Rams 1944–45, Cleveland Browns 1946–48, Buffalo Bills 1949
- Ed Doyle: Offensive lineman, Buffalo Bisons 1927
- Dick Poillon: Halfback, Washington Redskins 1942, 1946–49
- Richard Nurse: Wide receiver Hamilton Tiger-Cats 1990-95

== Championships ==
=== Conference championships ===
Conference affiliations:

- 1918–25, Independent
- 1926–49, Western New York Little Three Conference
- 1950–66, No team
- 1967–72, Independent
- 1973–92, Division III Independent
- 1993–2002, Metro Atlantic Athletic Conference

| Year | Conference | Coach | Overall record | Conference record |
|---|---|---|---|---|
| 1934 | Western New York Little Three Conference | William Joy | 4–2–0 | 2–0–0 |
| 1936 | Western New York Little Three Conference | William Joy | 7–1–0 | 2–0–0 |
| 1939 | Western New York Little Three Conference | James B. Wilson | 4–1–1 | 2–0–0 |
| 1941 | Western New York Little Three Conference (Co-Championship) | James B. Wilson | 3–4–1 | 1–1–0 |
| 1947 | Western New York Little Three Conference | Earl Brown | 7–2–0 | 2–0–0 |
| 1948 | Western New York Little Three Conference | James B. Wilson | 7–2–1 | 2–0–0 |
| 1949 | Western New York Little Three Conference (Co-Championship) | James B. Wilson | 5–2–0 | 2–1–0 |
| Total conference championships | | | 7 | |

== Bowl game appearances ==
| Season | Date | Bowl | W/L | Opponent | PF | PA | Coach | Notes |
|---|---|---|---|---|---|---|---|---|
| 1948 | December 5, 1948 | Great Lakes Bowl | L | John Carroll | 13 | 14 | James B. Wilson | |
| Total | | 1 bowl game | 0–1 | | 13 | 14 | | |
