= Frostburg State Bobcats =

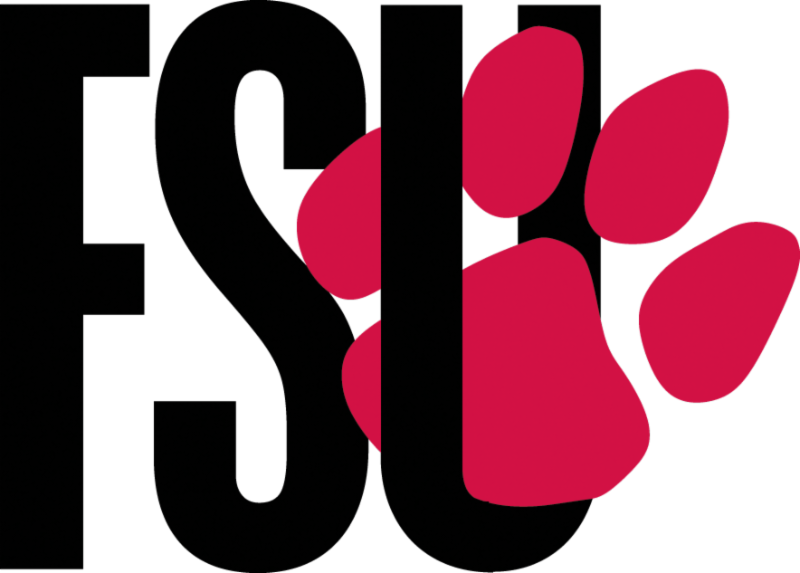
- University: Frostburg State University
- Nickname: Bobcats
- NCAA: Division II
- Conference: Mountain East; East Coast (men's lacrosse); Pennsylvania State Athletic Conference (field hockey)
- Athletic director: Rubin Stevenson
- Location: Frostburg, Maryland
- Varsity teams: 20
- Football stadium: Bobcat Stadium (4,000)
- Basketball arena: Bobcat Arena
- Baseball stadium: Bob Wells Field
- Other venues: Bobcat Natatorium
- Colors: Red, white, and black
- Website: frostburgsports.com
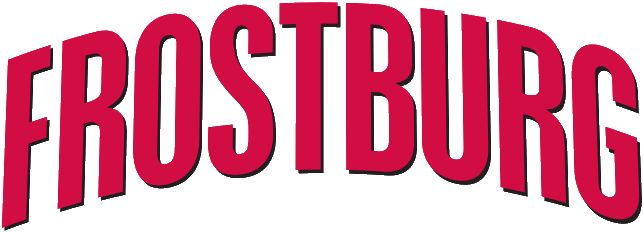

Team NCAA championships
- 1

The Frostburg State Bobcats are the athletic teams that represent Frostburg State University, located in Frostburg, Maryland, in NCAA Division II intercollegiate sports. The Bobcats compete as members of the Mountain East Conference for all sports except men's lacrosse, which is a single-sport member of the East Coast Conference, and field hockey, which is a member of the Pennsylvania State Athletic Conference.

== Varsity teams ==
| Men's sports | Women's sports |
|---|---|
| Baseball | Acrobatics |
| Basketball | Basketball |
| Cross Country | Cross Country |
| Football | Field hockey |
| Lacrosse | Lacrosse |
| Soccer | Soccer |
| Swimming | Softball |
| Tennis | Swimming |
| Track and field | Tennis |
| Wrestling | Track and field |
| | Volleyball |
| | Wrestling |
| | Rugby |

== Club Sports ==
Frostburg State also hosts a number of club sports alongside its varsity programs, providing students with additional opportunities for competition and recreation. These include rugby and esports, among others, which operate through student leadership with support from the university’s recreational sports programs. Club teams at Frostburg State University compete against other collegiate clubs and, in some cases, participate in regional or national governing bodies such as National Collegiate Rugby.

The men’s rugby team competes primarily in the Mid Atlantic Rugby Conference at the Division II club level, facing other institutions in the Mid-Atlantic region. In contrast, the women’s rugby team competes as a Division II program within the National Intercollegiate Rugby Association, with women’s rugby recognized through the NCAA emerging sports framework.

== Facilities ==
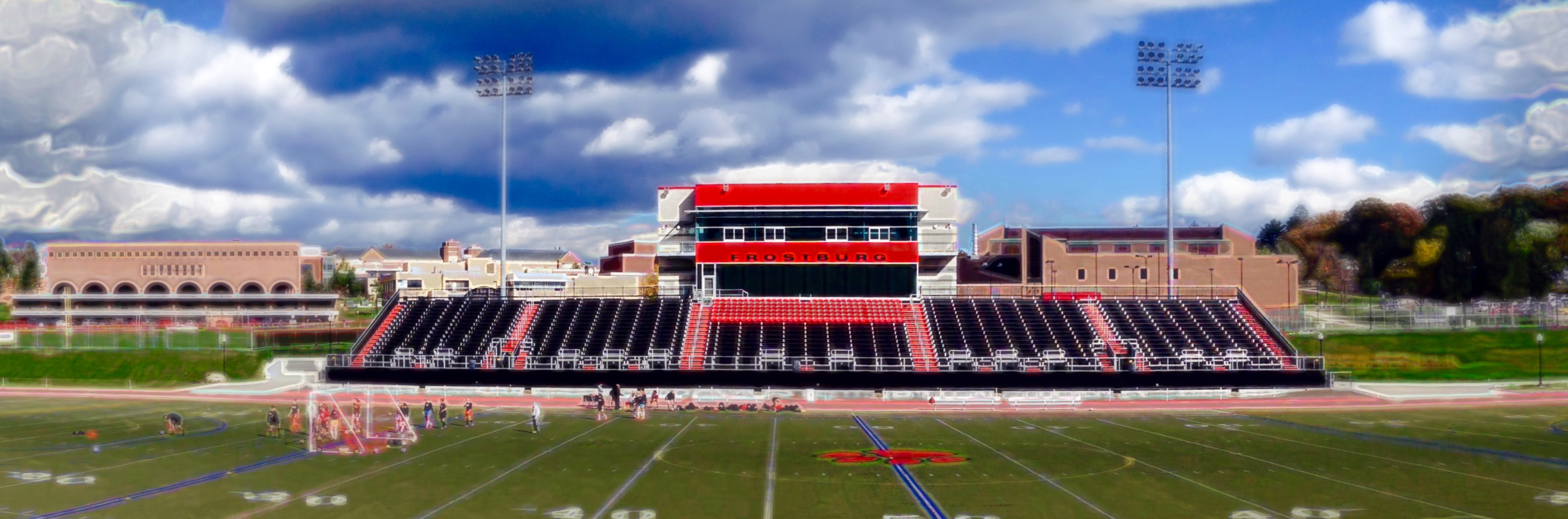
Bobcat Stadium, home of the FSU's football, soccer, lacrosse, field hockey, and track teams

- Bobcat Stadium was opened in 1974 and has an eight-lane track, with 4,000 seats. It is home to the FSU football, men's and women's soccer, field hockey, men's and women's lacrosse, and men's and women's track and field teams.
- Bobcat Natatorium is located in the Cordts PE Center and houses the men's and women's swimming and diving teams.
- Bob Wells Field is home to the FSU baseball team, and is long through center field and long down the sidelines. In addition, it has 250-person seating next to the field.
- Bobcat Field opened in 2001 is home of the FSU softball team. The seating holds around 250.
- Cordts Tennis Complex is home to FSU's men's and women's tennis teams and is located behind the Cordts PE Center. It contains six courts.

== National championships ==
=== Team ===
| Sport | Association | Division | Year | Opponent/Runner-up | Score |
|---|---|---|---|---|---|
| Men's indoor track and field (1) | NCAA | Division III | 1986 | Mount Union | 38–34 |
| Men's outdoor track and field (2) | NCAA | Division III | 1986 | Lincoln (Pa.), UW-La Crosse | 61-58 |
| Men's outdoor track and field (2) | NCAA | Division III | 1987 | Lincoln (Pa.) | 66-56 |
