= Sam Kornhauser =

American football player and coach

Biographical details
- Education: Southern Illinois; Vermont

Playing career
- 1967–1970: Missouri Valley

Coaching career (HC unless noted)
- 1971–1975: Brooklyn Tech HS (NY) (assistant)
- 1979–1983: Norwich (assistant)
- 1984–2005: Stony Brook

Head coaching record
- Overall: 105–110

Sam Kornhauser is an American former football player and coach. He was as the first head football coachat Stony Brook University, serving from 1984 to 2005 and compiling a record of 105–110.

Kornhauser was a standout athlete at Missouri Valley College in Marshall, Missouri.

== Head coaching record ==
Year	Team	Overall	Conference	Standing	Bowl/playoffs
Stony Brook Patriots (NCAA Division III independent) (1984–1987)
1984	Stony Brook	4–5			
1985	Stony Brook	6–4			
1986	Stony Brook	5–4			
1987	Stony Brook	4–5			
Stony Brook Patriots (Liberty Football Conference) (1988–1991)
1988	Stony Brook	5–4	4–2	3rd	
1989	Stony Brook	3–7	1–4	T–5th	
1990	Stony Brook	1–8	1–4	5th	
1991	Stony Brook	6–4	2–3	4th	
Stony Brook Patriots/Seawolves (Freedom Football Conference) (1992–1995)
1992	Stony Brook	6–4	2–3	5th	
1993	Stony Brook	6–3	3–2	3rd	
1994	Stony Brook	7–4	4–2	3rd	
1995	Stony Brook	7–3	3–2	T–3rd	
Stony Brook Seawolves (NCAA Division III independent) (1996)
1996	Stony Brook	6–4			
Stony Brook Seawolves (Eastern Football Conference) (1997–1998)
1997	Stony Brook	4–6	4–4	4th (Atlantic)	
1998	Stony Brook	3–7	3–5	T–4th (Atlantic)	
Stony Brook Seawolves (Northeast Conference) (1999–2005)
1999	Stony Brook	5–5	4–3	4th	
2000	Stony Brook	2–8	1–7	8th	
2001	Stony Brook	3–6	3–5	T–5th	
2002	Stony Brook	8–2	5–2	T–2nd	
2003	Stony Brook	6–4	4–3	T–3rd	
2004	Stony Brook	3–7	2–5	7th	
2005	Stony Brook	6–4	5–2	T–1st	
Stony Brook:		105–110	57–62		
Total:		105–110			
National championship Conference title Conference division title or championship game berth
