= Stony Brook Seawolves football, 1984–1998 =

American college football seasons

The Stony Brook Seawolves football program from 1984 to 1998 represented Stony Brook University during its first 15 years of college football competition. The team was known as the Patriots prior to the 1994 season. Stony Brook began playing in 1984 as an NCAA Division III independent. The team was a member of the Liberty Football Conference from 1988 to 1991 and the Freedom Football Conference (FFC) from 1992 to 1995 before returning to independent status in 1996. Stony Brook moved up to NCAA Division II competition in 1997, joining the Eastern Football Conference (EFC). In 1999, the Seawolves stepped up again, to the NCAA Division I-AA level as a member of the Northeastern Conference (NEC). Sam Kornhauser was the team's head coach throughout this entire period, coaching the team through the 2005 season.

== 1984 ==
1984 Stony Brook Patriots football
- Conference: Independent
- Record: 4–5
- Head coach: Sam Kornhauser (1st season)
- Home stadium: Seawolves Field

1984 NCAA Division III independents football records
	Conf.			Overall
Team	W	L	T	W		L		T
Dayton ^		–		10	–	1	–	0
Hofstra		–		9	–	1	–	0
Mercyhurst		–		8	–	1	–	0
Millsaps		–		8	–	1	–	0
Norwich		–		9	–	2	–	0
Union (NY) ^		–		9	–	2	–	0
Wabash		–		8	–	2	–	0
Salisbury State		–		6	–	3	–	0
Frostburg State		–		6	–	3	–	1
Buffalo		–		6	–	4	–	0
DePauw		–		6	–	4	–	0
Wagner		–		6	–	4	–	0
Buffalo State		–		5	–	4	–	0
Catholic University		–		5	–	4	–	0
Albany		–		5	–	5	–	0
Fordham		–		5	–	5	–	0
Fairleigh Dickinson–Florham		–		4	–	5	–	0
Stony Brook		–		4	–	5	–	0
Cortland		–		4	–	6	–	0
Duquesne		–		3	–	5	–	0
Canisius		–		2	–	8	–	0
Iona		–		2	–	8	–	0
San Diego		–		1	–	8	–	1
Georgetown		–		1	–	6	–	0
Saint Francis (PA)		–		1	–	7	–	0
Samford		–		1	–	7	–	0
Brockport		–		1	–	8	–	0
Colorado College		–		1	–	8	–	0
Rochester (NY)		–		1	–	8	–	0
^ – NCAA Division III playoff participant

The 1984 Stony Brook Patriots football team represented Stony Brook University as an independent during the 1984 NCAA Division III football season. Led by first-year head coach Sam Kornhauser, the Patriots compiled a record of 4–5.

=== Schedule ===
Date	Opponent	Site	Result	Attendance
September 14	at Hofstra	James M. Shuart Stadium; Hempstead, NY (Battle of Long Island)	L 0–45	3,817
September 21	at Fairleigh Dickinson–Florham	Madison, NJ	L 8–36	1,000
September 29	at Lowell	Lowell, MA	L 8–23	1,200
October 5	at Trenton State	Trenton, NJ	L 18–51	1,000
October 13	Maritime	Seawolves Field; Stony Brook, NY	W 34–7	
October 20	Stonehill	Seawolves Field; Stony Brook, NY	W 35–0	
October 27	at Ramapo	Mahwah, NJ	L 14–17	300
November 3	at Brockport	Brockport, NY	W 23–21	562
November 10	Fitchburg State	Seawolves Field; Stony Brook, NY	W 25–20	850

== 1985 ==
1985 Stony Brook Patriots football
- Conference: Independent
- Record: 6–4
- Head coach: Sam Kornhauser (2nd season)
- Home stadium: Seawolves Field

1985 NCAA Division III independents football records
	Conf.			Overall
Team	W	L	T	W		L		T
Villanova		–		5	–	0	–	0
Worcester State		–		5	–	0	–	0
Union (NY) ^		–		9	–	1	–	0
Millsaps		–		7	–	1	–	1
Salisbury State ^		–		10	–	2	–	0
Albany		–		9	–	2	–	0
Wagner		–		9	–	2	–	0
DePauw		–		8	–	2	–	0
Mercyhurst		–		8	–	2	–	0
Wabash		–		7	–	2	–	1
Canisius		–		6	–	2	–	1
Dayton		–		7	–	3	–	0
Marist		–		5	–	3	–	0
Frostburg State		–		6	–	4	–	0
Stony Brook		–		6	–	4	–	0
Fairleigh Dickinson–Florham		–		5	–	4	–	0
Georgetown		–		5	–	4	–	0
Ferrum		–		6	–	5	–	0
Norwich		–		5	–	5	–	0
Cortland		–		4	–	5	–	0
Buffalo		–		4	–	6	–	0
Hofstra		–		4	–	6	–	0
San Diego		–		3	–	5	–	0
Duquesne		–		3	–	6	–	0
MacMurray		–		2	–	4	–	0
Saint Peter's		–		2	–	5	–	0
Brooklyn		–		2	–	6	–	0
Buffalo State		–		2	–	7	–	0
Rochester (NY)		–		2	–	7	–	0
Samford		–		2	–	8	–	0
Catholic University		–		2	–	9	–	0
Brockport		–		1	–	9	–	1
Colorado College		–		1	–	8	–	0
Saint Francis (PA)		–		0	–	9	–	0
^ – NCAA Division III playoff participant

The 1985 Stony Brook Patriots football team represented Stony Brook University as an independent during the 1985 NCAA Division III football season. Led by second-year head coach Sam Kornhauser, the Patriots compiled a record of 6–4.

=== Schedule ===
Date	Opponent	Site	Result	Attendance	Source
September 14	Ramapo	Seawolves Field; Stony Brook, NY	W 22–6	850	
September 20	at Hofstra	James M. Shuart Stadium; Hempstead, NY (Battle of Long Island)	L 15–17	4,216	
September 28	at Wagner	Wagner College Stadium; Staten Island, NY	L 10–26	2,700	
October 5	Worcester State	Seawolves Field; Stony Brook, NY	L 10–35	300–900	
October 12	Kean	Seawolves Field; Stony Brook, NY	L 13–21	1,000	
October 20	at Fitchburg State	Fitchburg, MA	W 39–0	500	
October 26	Brooklyn	Seawolves Field; Stony Brook, NY	W 38–0	800	
November 2	at Merchant Marine	Bronx, NY	W 36–0		
November 8	at Saint Peter's	Jersey City, NJ	W 45–6		
November 16	Brockport	Seawolves Field; Stony Brook, NY	W 19–0	200	

== 1986 ==
1986 Stony Brook Patriots football
- Conference: Independent
- Record: 5–4
- Head coach: Sam Kornhauser (3rd season)
- Home stadium: Seawolves Field

1986 NCAA Division III independents football records
	Conf.			Overall
Team	W	L	T	W		L		T
No. 5 Salisbury State ^		–		13	–	1	–	0
No. 1 Dayton ^		–		10	–	1	–	0
No. 9 Union (NY) ^		–		9	–	1	–	0
Villanova		–		8	–	1	–	0
No. 20 Buffalo		–		9	–	2	–	0
No. 12 Hofstra ^		–		9	–	2	–	0
Wagner		–		9	–	2	–	0
Millsaps		–		7	–	2	–	0
MacMurray		–		6	–	3	–	0
Wabash		–		6	–	3	–	0
Duquesne		–		5	–	3	–	1
DePauw		–		6	–	4	–	0
Mercyhurst		–		6	–	4	–	0
Western Connecticut State		–		6	–	4	–	0
Canisius		–		5	–	4	–	0
Colorado College		–		5	–	4	–	0
Stony Brook		–		5	–	4	–	0
Georgetown		–		4	–	4	–	0
Menlo		–		4	–	4	–	1
Fairleigh Dickinson–Florham		–		4	–	5	–	0
Saint Francis (PA)		–		4	–	5	–	0
UC Santa Barbara		–		4	–	5	–	0
Albany		–		4	–	6	–	0
Brockport		–		4	–	6	–	0
Brooklyn		–		4	–	6	–	0
San Diego		–		4	–	6	–	0
Marist		–		3	–	5	–	0
Samford		–		3	–	6	–	0
Frostburg State		–		3	–	7	–	0
Ferrum		–		3	–	8	–	0
Catholic University		–		2	–	8	–	1
Aurora		–		1	–	4	–	0
Norwich		–		2	–	8	–	0
Rochester (NY)		–		1	–	7	–	1
Buffalo State		–		1	–	8	–	0
Cortland		–		1	–	8	–	0
Saint Peter's		–		0	–	8	–	0
Wesley		–		0	–	8	–	0
^ – NCAA Division III playoff participant; Rankings from NCAA Division III poll

The 1986 Stony Brook Patriots football team represented Stony Brook University as an independent during the 1986 NCAA Division III football season. Led by third-year head coach Sam Kornhauser, the Patriots compiled a record of 5–4.

=== Schedule ===
Date	Opponent	Site	Result	Attendance
September 13	at Ramapo	Mahwah, NJ	W 34–16	500
September 20	Hofstra	Seawolves Field; Stony Brook, NY (Battle of Long Island)	L 3–13	1,500
September 27	Pace	Seawolves Field; Stony Brook, NY	L 22–26	1,200
October 4	Cortland State	Seawolves Field; Stony Brook, NY	W 10–7	1,000
October 11	at Kean	Union, NJ	W 44–20	200
October 24	at Brooklyn	Brooklyn, NY	W 43–6	200
November 1	at St. John's	DaSilva Memorial Field; Jamaica, New York	L 13–17	1,503
November 8	Saint Peter's	Seawolves Field; Stony Brook, NY	W 48–0	184
November 15	at Brockport	Brockport, NY	L 0–14	294

== 1987 ==
1987 Stony Brook Patriots football
- Conference: Independent
- Record: 4–5
- Head coach: Sam Kornhauser (4th season)
- Home stadium: Seawolves Field

1987 NCAA Division III independents football records
	Conf.			Overall
Team	W	L	T	W		L		T
Wagner ^		–		13	–	1	–	0
Samford		–		9	–	1	–	0
Rochester (NY) ^		–		9	–	2	–	0
Hofstra ^		–		8	–	2	–	0
UC Santa Barbara		–		8	–	2	–	0
Wabash		–		8	–	2	–	0
Dayton ^		–		11	–	3	–	0
Ferrum ^		–		8	–	2	–	1
Salisbury State		–		7	–	2	–	0
Georgetown		–		6	–	2	–	1
DePauw		–		7	–	3	–	0
Menlo ^		–		7	–	3	–	0
Millsaps		–		7	–	3	–	0
Canisius		–		6	–	3	–	1
San Diego		–		6	–	3	–	1
Mercyhurst		–		6	–	4	–	0
Cortland		–		5	–	4	–	0
Fairleigh Dickinson–Florham		–		5	–	4	–	0
Albany		–		5	–	5	–	0
Drake		–		5	–	5	–	0
Norwich		–		4	–	4	–	1
Union (NY)		–		5	–	5	–	0
Aurora		–		4	–	5	–	0
Stony Brook		–		4	–	5	–	0
Brockport		–		3	–	6	–	0
Buffalo		–		3	–	7	–	0
Catholic University		–		3	–	7	–	0
Saint Francis (PA)		–		2	–	6	–	0
Brooklyn		–		2	–	7	–	0
Colorado College		–		2	–	7	–	0
Duquesne		–		2	–	7	–	0
Frostburg State		–		2	–	8	–	0
Saint Peter's		–		2	–	8	–	0
Marist		–		1	–	7	–	0
Quincy		–		1	–	7	–	0
Western Connecticut State		–		1	–	8	–	1
Buffalo State		–		1	–	9	–	0
Wesley		–		0	–	9	–	0
^ – NCAA Division III playoff participant

The 1987 Stony Brook Patriots football team represented Stony Brook University as an independent during the 1987 NCAA Division III football season. Led by fourth-year head coach Sam Kornhauser, the Patriots compiled a record of 4–5.

=== Schedule ===
Date	Opponent	Site	Result	Attendance
September 12	Ramapo	Seawolves Field; Stony Brook, NY	W 34–6	1,100
September 18	at Hofstra	James M. Shuart Stadium; Hempstead, NY (Battle of Long Island)	L 3–24	2,719
October 3	at Cortland State	Cortland, NY	L 0–23	822
October 10	Kean	Seawolves Field; Stony Brook, NY	L 7–14	850
October 17	Brooklyn	Seawolves Field; Stony Brook, NY	W 48–12	1,450
October 24	at Fordham	Coffey Field; Bronx, NY	L 6–14	6,013
October 31	St. John's	Seawolves Field; Stony Brook, NY	L 3–21	1,275
November 6	at Saint Peter's	Jersey City, NJ	W 26–0	500
November 14	Brockport	Seawolves Field; Stony Brook, NY	W 24–7	1,250

== 1988 ==
1988 Stony Brook Patriots football
- Conference: Liberty Football Conference
- Record: 5–4 (4–2 LFC)
- Head coach: Sam Kornhauser (5th season)
- Home stadium: Seawolves Field

1988 Liberty Football Conference standings
	Conf.					Overall
Team	W		L		T	W		L		T
Fordham +	5	–	1	–	0	9	–	2	–	0
C. W. Post +	5	–	1	–	0	5	–	5	–	0
Stony Brook	4	–	2	–	0	5	–	4	–	0
St. John's	3	–	3	–	0	5	–	5	–	0
Iona	2	–	4	–	0	3	–	6	–	0
Pace	1	–	5	–	0	3	–	7	–	0
Merchant Marine	1	–	5	–	0	2	–	8	–	0
+ – Conference co-champions

The 1988 Stony Brook Patriots football team represented Stony Brook University as a member of the Liberty Football Conference (LFC) during the 1988 NCAA Division III football season. Led by fifth-year head coach Sam Kornhauser, the Patriots compiled an overall record of 5–4 with a mark of 4–2 in conference play, placing third in the LFC.

=== Schedule ===
Date	Opponent	Site	Result	Attendance
September 10	at Ramapo*	Mahwah, NJ	L 7–14	
September 17	Hofstra*	Seawolves Field; Stony Brook, NY (Battle of Long Island)	L 3–8	2,400
September 24	at St. John's	DaSilva Memorial Field; Jamaica, New York	L 11–26	1,546
October 1	Iona	Seawolves Field; Stony Brook, NY	W 3–0	1,200
October 8	at C. W. Post	Brookville, NY	L 7–13	525
October 14	Brooklyn*	Brooklyn, NY	W 70–20	
October 22	Fordham	Seawolves Field; Stony Brook, NY	W 3–0	2,300
October 29	at Merchant Marine	Kings Point, NY	W 16–10	1,051
November 12	Pace	Seawolves Field; Stony Brook, NY	W 38–0	2,000
*Non-conference game

== 1989 ==
1989 Stony Brook Patriots football
- Conference: Liberty Football Conference
- Record: 3–7 (1–4 LFC)
- Head coach: Sam Kornhauser (6th season)
- Home stadium: Seawolves Field

1989 Liberty Football Conference standings
	Conf.					Overall
Team	W		L		T	W		L		T
St. John's $	5	–	0	–	0	9	–	1	–	0
Iona	4	–	1	–	0	8	–	2	–	0
Merchant Marine	2	–	3	–	0	5	–	4	–	0
C. W. Post	2	–	3	–	0	5	–	5	–	0
Stony Brook	1	–	4	–	0	3	–	7	–	0
Pace	1	–	4	–	0	1	–	9	–	0
$ – Conference champion

The 1989 Stony Brook Patriots football team represented Stony Brook University as a member of the Liberty Football Conference (LFC) during the 1989 NCAA Division III football season. Led by sixth-year head coach Sam Kornhauser, the Patriots compiled an overall record of 3–7 with a mark of 1–4 in conference play, tying for fifth place in the LFC.

=== Schedule ===
Date	Opponent	Site	Result	Attendance
September 8	Ramapo*	Seawolves Field; Stony Brook, NY	L 13–33	1,125
September 17	at Hofstra*	James M. Shuart Stadium; Hempstead, NY (Battle of Long Island)	L 6–28	2,417
September 24	St. John's	Seawolves Field; Stony Brook, NY	L 21–38	2,926
September 30	at Iona	Mazzella Field; New Rochelle, NY	L 10–40	1,309
October 7	C. W. Post	Seawolves Field; Stony Brook, NY	L 10–14	1,017
October 13	at Bentley*	Waltham, MA	W 43–24	578
October 21	Stonehill*	Seawolves Field; Stony Brook, NY	W 41–31	1,281
October 28	Merchant Marine	Seawolves Field; Stony Brook, NY	W 26–10	1,297
November 4	WPI*	Seawolves Field; Stony Brook, NY	L 6–38	1,046
November 11	at Pace		L 9–10	1,000
*Non-conference game

== 1990 ==
1990 Stony Brook Patriots football
- Conference: Liberty Football Conference
- Record: 1–8–1 (1–4 LFC)
- Head coach: Sam Kornhauser (7th season)
- Home stadium: Seawolves Field

1990 Liberty Football Conference standings
	Conf.					Overall
Team	W		L		T	W		L		T
C. W. Post $	5	–	0	–	0	7	–	3	–	0
Merchant Marine	4	–	1	–	0	6	–	3	–	0
St. John's	3	–	2	–	0	5	–	5	–	0
Iona	2	–	3	–	0	5	–	5	–	0
Stony Brook	1	–	4	–	0	1	–	8	–	0
Pace	0	–	5	–	0	1	–	9	–	0
$ – Conference champion

The 1990 Stony Brook Patriots football team represented Stony Brook University as a member of the Liberty Football Conference (LFC) during the 1990 NCAA Division III football season. Led by seventh-year head coach Sam Kornhauser, the Patriots compiled an overall record of 1–8–1 with a mark of 1–4 in conference play, placing fifth in the LFC.

=== Schedule ===
Date	Opponent	Site	Result	Attendance
September 8	Ramapo*	Seawolves Field; Stony Brook, NY	L 0–24	1,497
September 15	Hofstra*	Seawolves Field; Stony Brook, NY (Battle of Long Island)	L 0–48	1,706
September 21	at St. John's	DaSilva Memorial Field; Jamaica, New York	L 0–21	2,104
September 29	Iona	Seawolves Field; Stony Brook, NY	L 10–28	911
October 6	at C. W. Post	Brookville, NY	L 7–38	1,164
October 13	Bentley*	Seawolves Field; Stony Brook, NY	L 3–13	250
October 20	at Stonehill*	Easton, MA	T 27–27	1,005
October 27	at Merchant Marine	Kings Point, NY	L 19–25	1,100
November 3	at WPI*	Worcester, MA	L 10–42	1,000
November 10	Pace	Seawolves Field; Stony Brook, NY	W 16–14	150
*Non-conference game

== 1991 ==
1991 Stony Brook Patriots football
- Conference: Liberty Football Conference
- Record: 6–4 (2–3 LFC)
- Head coach: Sam Kornhauser (8th season)
- Home stadium: Seawolves Field

1991 Liberty Football Conference standings
	Conf.					Overall
Team	W		L		T	W		L		T
St. John's $	4	–	1	–	0	6	–	4	–	0
Iona	3	–	1	–	1	7	–	2	–	1
C. W. Post	3	–	2	–	0	4	–	6	–	0
Stony Brook	2	–	3	–	0	6	–	4	–	0
Merchant Marine	1	–	3	–	1	2	–	6	–	1
Pace	1	–	4	–	0	2	–	8	–	0
$ – Conference champion

The 1991 Stony Brook Patriots football team represented Stony Brook University as a member of the Liberty Football Conference (LFC) during the 1991 NCAA Division III football season. Led by eighth-year head coach Sam Kornhauser, the Patriots compiled an overall record of 6–4 with a mark of 2–3 in conference play, placing forth in the LFC.

=== Schedule ===
Date	Opponent	Site	Result	Attendance
September 14	at Ramapo*	Mahwah, NJ	L 0–12	500
September 21	at Bentley*	Waltham, MA	W 24–6	750
September 28	St. John's	Seawolves Field; Stony Brook, NY	W 37–35	1,037
October 5	at Iona	Mazzella Field; New Rochelle, NY	L 6–37	1,200
October 12	C. W. Post	Seawolves Field; Stony Brook, NY	L 7–13	936
October 19	Wesley (DE)*	Seawolves Field; Stony Brook, NY	W 14–6	1,684
October 26	at Merchant Marine	Kings Point, NY	L 7–23	1,382
November 2	Western Connecticut	Seawolves Field; Stony Brook, NY	W 14–9	761
November 9	at MIT*	Cambridge, MA	W 38–0	204
November 16	at Pace		W 14–10	500
*Non-conference game

== 1992 ==
1992 Stony Brook Patriots football
- Conference: Freedom Football Conference
- Record: 5–5 (2–4 FFC)
- Head coach: Sam Kornhauser (9th season)
- Home stadium: Seawolves Field

1992 Freedom Football Conference standings
	Conf.					Overall
Team	W		L		T	W		L		T
WPI $^	5	–	0	–	0	9	–	2	–	0
Merchant Marine	4	–	1	–	0	7	–	1	–	1
Plymouth State	4	–	1	–	1	4	–	4	–	1
UMass Lowell	2	–	3	–	1	4	–	4	–	1
Stony Brook	2	–	3	–	0	5	–	5	–	0
Norwich	2	–	4	–	0	3	–	6	–	0
Western Connecticut	2	–	4	–	0	2	–	8	–	0
Coast Guard	1	–	6	–	0	1	–	8	–	0
$ – Conference champion; ^ – NCAA Division III playoff participant

The 1992 Stony Brook Patriots football team represented Stony Brook University as a member of the Freedom Football Conference (FFC) during the 1992 NCAA Division III football season. Led by ninth-year head coach Sam Kornhauser, the Patriots compiled an overall record of 5–5 with a mark of 2–4 in conference play, tying for sixth place in the FFC.

=== Schedule ===
Date	Opponent	Site	Result	Attendance
September 12	Pace*	Seawolves Field; Stony Brook, NY	W 28–0	700
September 19	Bentley*	Seawolves Field; Stony Brook, NY	W 27–12	600
September 26	at Coast Guard	New London, CT	W 24–19	1,000
October 3	Sacred Heart*	Seawolves Field; Stony Brook, NY	W 20–0	950
October 10	at Gettysburg*	Gettysburg, PA	L 12–15	503
October 17	at Wesley (DE)*	Dover, DE	L 14–21	3,673
October 24	Merchant Marine	Seawolves Field; Stony Brook, NY	L 7–28	2,912
October 31	at Western Connecticut	Danbury, CT	L 16–20	2,125
November 7	Plymouth State	Seawolves Field; Stony Brook, NY	L 10–21	425
November 14	UMass Lowell	Seawolves Field; Stony Brook, NY	W 31–27	250
*Non-conference game

== 1993 ==
1993 Stony Brook Patriots football
- Conference: Freedom Football Conference
- Record: 6–3–1 (3–2 FFC)
- Head coach: Sam Kornhauser (10th season)
- Home stadium: Seawolves Field

1993 Freedom Football Conference standings
	Conf.					Overall
Team	W		L		T	W		L		T
WPI $	5	–	0	–	0	5	–	4	–	0
Plymouth State	5	–	1	–	0	6	–	4	–	0
Stony Brook	3	–	2	–	0	6	–	3	–	1
Coast Guard	3	–	3	–	0	4	–	5	–	0
Merchant Marine	2	–	3	–	0	5	–	4	–	0
UMass Lowell	2	–	3	–	0	5	–	5	–	0
Western Connecticut	2	–	4	–	0	4	–	6	–	0
Norwich	0	–	6	–	0	0	–	9	–	0
$ – Conference champion

The 1993 Stony Brook Patriots football team represented Stony Brook University as a member of the Freedom Football Conference (FFC) during the 1993 NCAA Division III football season. Led by tenth-year head coach Sam Kornhauser, the Patriots compiled an overall record of 6–3–1 with a mark of 3–2 in conference play, placing third in the FFC.

=== Schedule ===
Date	Opponent	Site	Result	Attendance
September 11	at Pace*		W 20–2	250
September 18	at Jersey City State*	Jersey City, NJ	T 22–22	425
September 25	Coast Guard	Seawolves Field; Stony Brook, NY	W 21–14	650
October 2	at Sacred Heart*	Campus Field; Fairfield, CT	W 20–13	1,800
October 9	Gettysburg*	Seawolves Field; Stony Brook, NY	W 43–36	875
October 23	at Merchant Marine	Kings Point, NY	W 21–20	3,650
October 30	Western Connecticut	Seawolves Field; Stony Brook, NY	W 33–6	1,823
November 6	at Plymouth State	Plymouth, NH	L 9–26	973
November 13	at UMass Lowell	Lowell, MA	L 18–38	300
November 25	at St. John's*	DaSilva Memorial Field; Jamaica, New York	L 14–17	1,052
*Non-conference game

== 1994 ==
1994 Stony Brook Seawolves football

ECAC Bowl—Southeast Championship, L 21–28 vs. Wilkes
- Conference: Freedom Football Conference
- Record: 7–4 (4–2 FFC)
- Head coach: Sam Kornhauser (11th season)
- Home stadium: Seawolves Field

1994 Freedom Football Conference standings
	Conf.					Overall
Team	W		L		T	W		L		T
Plymouth State +^	6	–	0	–	0	10	–	1	–	0
Merchant Marine +^	5	–	0	–	0	7	–	3	–	0
Stony Brook	4	–	2	–	0	7	–	4	–	0
WPI	3	–	2	–	0	5	–	4	–	0
Coast Guard	2	–	4	–	0	4	–	5	–	0
Norwich	2	–	5	–	0	3	–	6	–	0
Western Connecticut	1	–	5	–	0	1	–	9	–	0
UMass Lowell	0	–	5	–	0	0	–	10	–	0
+ – Conference co-champions; ^ – NCAA Division III playoff participant

The 1994 Stony Brook Seawolves football team represented Stony Brook University as a member of the Freedom Football Conference (FFC) during the 1994 NCAA Division III football season. Led by 11th-year head coach Sam Kornhauser, the Seawolves compiled an overall record of 7–4 with a mark of 4–2 in conference play, placing third in the FFC. Stony Brook was invited to the ECAC Bowl—Southeast Championship, where the Seawolves lost to Wilkes.

=== Schedule ===
Date	Opponent	Site	Result	Attendance	Source
September 10	Pace*	Seawolves Field; Stony Brook, NY	W 32–0	1,087	
September 17	Jersey City State*	Seawolves Field; Stony Brook, NY	W 25–7	925	
September 24	at Coast Guard	Cadet Memorial Field; New London, CT	W 22–21	1,500	
October 1	Sacred Heart*	Seawolves Field; Stony Brook, NY	W 22–6	750	
October 8	at Gettysburg*	Gettysburg, PA	L 41–48	2,498	
October 15	Norwich	Seawolves Field; Stony Brook, NY	W 21–6	2,352	
October 22	Merchant Marine	Seawolves Field; Stony Brook, NY	L 6–13	1,402	
October 29	at Western Connecticut	Danbury, CT	W 32–0	2,433	
November 5	at Plymouth State	Currier Field; Plymouth, NH	L 31–37	1,500–3,718	
November 12	UMass Lowell	Seawolves Field; Stony Brook, NY	W 54–0	1,117	
November 19	Wilkes*	Seawolves Field; Stony Brook, NY (ECAC Bowl—Southeast Championship)	L 21–28 ^{OT}		
*Non-conference game

== 1995 ==
1995 Stony Brook Seawolves football
- Conference: Freedom Football Conference
- Record: 7–3 (3–2 FFC)
- Head coach: Sam Kornhauser (12th season)
- Home stadium: Seawolves Field

1995 Freedom Football Conference standings
	Conf.					Overall
Team	W		L		T	W		L		T
Plymouth State $^	7	–	0	–	0	9	–	1	–	0
Western Connecticut	4	–	2	–	0	7	–	2	–	1
Springfield (MA)	3	–	2	–	0	8	–	2	–	0
Stony Brook	3	–	2	–	0	7	–	3	–	0
WPI	3	–	3	–	0	4	–	5	–	0
Merchant Marine	2	–	3	–	0	5	–	4	–	0
Coast Guard	2	–	4	–	0	4	–	6	–	0
Norwich	2	–	5	–	0	3	–	6	–	0
UMass Lowell	0	–	5	–	0	0	–	10	–	0
$ – Conference champion; ^ – NCAA Division III playoff participant

The 1995 Stony Brook Seawolves football team represented Stony Brook University as a member of the Freedom Football Conference (FFC) during the 1995 NCAA Division III football season. Led by 12th-year head coach Sam Kornhauser, the Seawolves compiled an overall record of 7–3 with a mark of 3–2 in conference play, tying for third place in the FFC.

=== Schedule ===
Date	Opponent	Site	Result	Attendance	Source
September 9	at Pace*		W 21–19	650	
September 16	at Wagner*	Wagner College Stadium; Staten Island, NY	L 27–28	1,346	
September 30	at Sacred Heart*	Campus Field; Fairfield, CT	W 44–17	2,138	
October 7	Springfield	Seawolves Field; Stony Brook, NY	W 33–22	1,126	
October 14	at Norwich	Northfield, VT	W 27–12	2,137	
October 21	American International*	Seawolves Field; Stony Brook, NY	W 23–22	1,382	
October 28	Western Connecticut	Seawolves Field; Stony Brook, NY	L 13–21	467	
November 4	Plymouth State	Seawolves Field; Stony Brook, NY	L 13–20	1,417	
November 11	at UMass Lowell	Lowell, MA	W 26–0	257	
November 23	at Albany	University Field; Albany, NY (rivalry)	W 40–21	1,126	
*Non-conference game

== 1996 ==
1996 Stony Brook Seawolves football
- Conference: Independent
- Record: 6–4
- Head coach: Sam Kornhauser (13th season)
- Home stadium: Seawolves Field

1996 NCAA Division III independents football records
	Conf.			Overall
Team	W		L	W		L
Frostburg State		–		9	–	2
Buffalo State ^		–		8	–	2
Catholic University		–		7	–	2
Chapman		–		7	–	2
Wesley		–		7	–	2
Pomona-Pitzer		–		6	–	2
Ithaca		–		6	–	3
Brockport		–		6	–	4
Cortland		–		6	–	4
Hartwick		–		6	–	4
Methodist		–		6	–	4
Stony Brook		–		6	–	4
Thomas More		–		6	–	4
Aurora		–		5	–	4
Menlo		–		5	–	4
Wilmington (OH)		–		5	–	5
Salisbury State		–		4	–	5
Colorado College		–		3	–	6
Defiance		–		3	–	6
Maryville (TN)		–		3	–	6
Chowan		–		3	–	7
Bluffton		–		2	–	8
Ferrum		–		1	–	8
^ – NCAA Division III playoff participant

The 1996 Stony Brook Seawolves football team represented Stony Brook University as an independent during the 1996 NCAA Division III football season. Led by 13th-year head coach Sam Kornhauser, the Seawolves compiled a record of 6–4.

=== Schedule ===
Date	Opponent	Site	Result	Attendance
September 14	Pace	Seawolves Field; Stony Brook, NY	W 27–21	1,035
September 21	Montclair State	Seawolves Field; Stony Brook, NY	W 10–7	750
September 28	at Bentley	Waltham, MA	L 6–29	1,500
October 5	Sacred Heart	Seawolves Field; Stony Brook, NY	W 26–9	700
October 12	at Central Connecticut State	Arute Field; New Britain, CT	W 52–7	875
October 19	Albany	Seawolves Field; Stony Brook, NY (rivalry)	L 12–19	250
October 26	C. W. Post	Seawolves Field; Stony Brook, NY	L 13–16	2,465
November 9	Wagner	Seawolves Field; Stony Brook, NY	L 20–27	505
November 16	at Southern Connecticut State	New Haven, CT	W 31–28	492
November 28	at St. John's	DaSilva Memorial Field; Jamaica, New York	W 24–9	1,105

== 1997 ==
1997 Stony Brook Seawolves football
- Conference: Eastern Football Conference
- Atlantic Division
- Record: 4–6 (4–4 EFC)
- Head coach: Sam Kornhauser (14th season)
- Home stadium: Seawolves Field

1997 Eastern Football Conference standings
	Conf.			Overall
Team	W		L	W		L
Atlantic Division
Albany xy$	8	–	0	11	–	1
Southern Connecticut	6	–	2	7	–	4
C. W. Post	5	–	3	6	–	4
Stony Brook	4	–	4	4	–	6
Pace	3	–	4	4	–	5
Sacred Heart	1	–	7	1	–	9
Bay State Division
American International xy	8	–	0	8	–	4
Bentley	5	–	3	6	–	3
Stonehill	3	–	5	4	–	6
Merrimack	3	–	5	3	–	6
UMass Lowell	1	–	7	2	–	8
Assumption	0	–	7	0	–	9
Championship: Albany 27, American International 20
$ – Conference champion; x – Division champion/co-champions; y – Championship game participant

The 1997 Stony Brook Seawolves football team represented Stony Brook University as a member of the Atlantic Division of Eastern Football Conference (EFC) during the 1997 NCAA Division II football season. Led by 14th-year head coach Sam Kornhauser, the Seawolves compiled an overall record of 4–6 with a mark of 4–4 in conference play, placing fourth in the EFC's Atlantic Division.

=== Schedule ===
Date	Opponent	Site	Result	Attendance
September 13	Southern Connecticut State	Seawolves Field; Stony Brook, NY	L 13–15	822
September 20	at Pace		W 38–7	600
September 27	St. John's*	Seawolves Field; Stony Brook, NY	L 19–23	1,129
October 4	Sacred Heart	Seawolves Field; Stony Brook, NY	W 22–7	350
October 11	Bentley	Seawolves Field; Stony Brook, NY	W 35–9	1,000
October 18	at Albany	University Field; Albany, NY (rivalry)	L 23–30	5,620
October 25	Merrimack	Seawolves Field; Stony Brook, NY	W 17–6	728
November 1	at Wagner*	Wagner College Stadium; Staten Island, NY	L 0–10	620
November 8	at American International	Springfield, MA	L 7–30	200
November 15	C. W. Post	Brookville, NY	L 0–7	447
*Non-conference game

== 1998 ==
1998 Stony Brook Seawolves football
- Conference: Eastern Football Conference
- Atlantic Division
- Record: 3–7 (3–5 EFC)
- Head coach: Sam Kornhauser (15th season)
- Home stadium: Seawolves Field

1998 Eastern Football Conference standings
	Conf.			Overall
Team	W		L	W		L
Atlantic Division
Albany xy$	7	–	1	10	–	1
Southern Connecticut	6	–	2	8	–	2
C. W. Post	6	–	2	7	–	3
Pace	3	–	5	5	–	5
Stony Brook	3	–	5	3	–	6
Bay State Division
Bentley x	7	–	2	8	–	2
American International xy	7	–	2	7	–	4
Merrimack	2	–	6	3	–	6
Stonehill	2	–	6	2	–	8
UMass Lowell	2	–	6	2	–	8
Assumption	0	–	8	0	–	9
Championship: Albany 25, American International 24
$ – Conference champion; x – Division champion/co-champions; y – Championship game participant

The 1998 Stony Brook Seawolves football team represented Stony Brook University as a member of the Atlantic Division of Eastern Football Conference (EFC) during the 1998 NCAA Division II football season. Led by 15th-year head coach Sam Kornhauser, the Seawolves compiled an overall record of 3–7 with a mark of 3–5 in conference play, tying for fourth place in the EFC's Atlantic Division.

=== Schedule ===
Date	Opponent	Site	Result	Attendance
September 11	at Southern Connecticut State	New Haven, CT	L 16–64	1,432
September 26	Pace	Seawolves Field; Stony Brook, NY	W 30–16	1,113
October 3	at Assumption*	Worcester, MA	W 39–6	1,846
October 10	at Bentley*	Waltham, MA	L 7–9	550
October 17	Albany	Seawolves Field; Stony Brook, NY (rivalry)	L 16–42	1,832
October 24	at Merrimack*	North Andover, MA	W 19–14	677
October 31	Wagner*	Seawolves Field; Stony Brook, NY	L 13–14	503
November 7	American International*	Seawolves Field; Stony Brook, NY	L 7–35	401
November 14	C. W. Post	Seawolves Field; Stony Brook, NY	L 3–9	596
November 27	at St. John's	DaSilva Memorial Field; Jamaica, New York	L 3–17	2,111
*Non-conference game
