= Oshin (disambiguation) =

Oshin is a 1983–1984 Japanese morning television drama series.

Oshin may also refer to:

- Oshin (album), 2012 album by American rock band DIIV

== Given name ==
- Oshin Derieuw (born in 1987), Belgian boxer
- Oshin of Lampron (fl. 1070s), Armenian nobleman
- Oshin, King of Armenia (1282–1320), king of the Armenian Kingdom of Cilicia
- Oshin of Korikos (died 1329), regent of the Armenian Kingdom of Cilicia
- Oshin Sahakian (born 1986), Iranian basketball player of Armenian descent

== Surname ==
- Bimbo Oshin (born 1971), Nigerian actress
- Tope Oshin (born 1979), Nigerian film and television director

== See also ==
- Osin, a surname
- Samuel Oschin (1914–2003), American entrepreneur
- Lou Oshins (c. 1902–1975), American college football coach
