= Don Brown (American football coach) =

American football player and coach (born 1955)

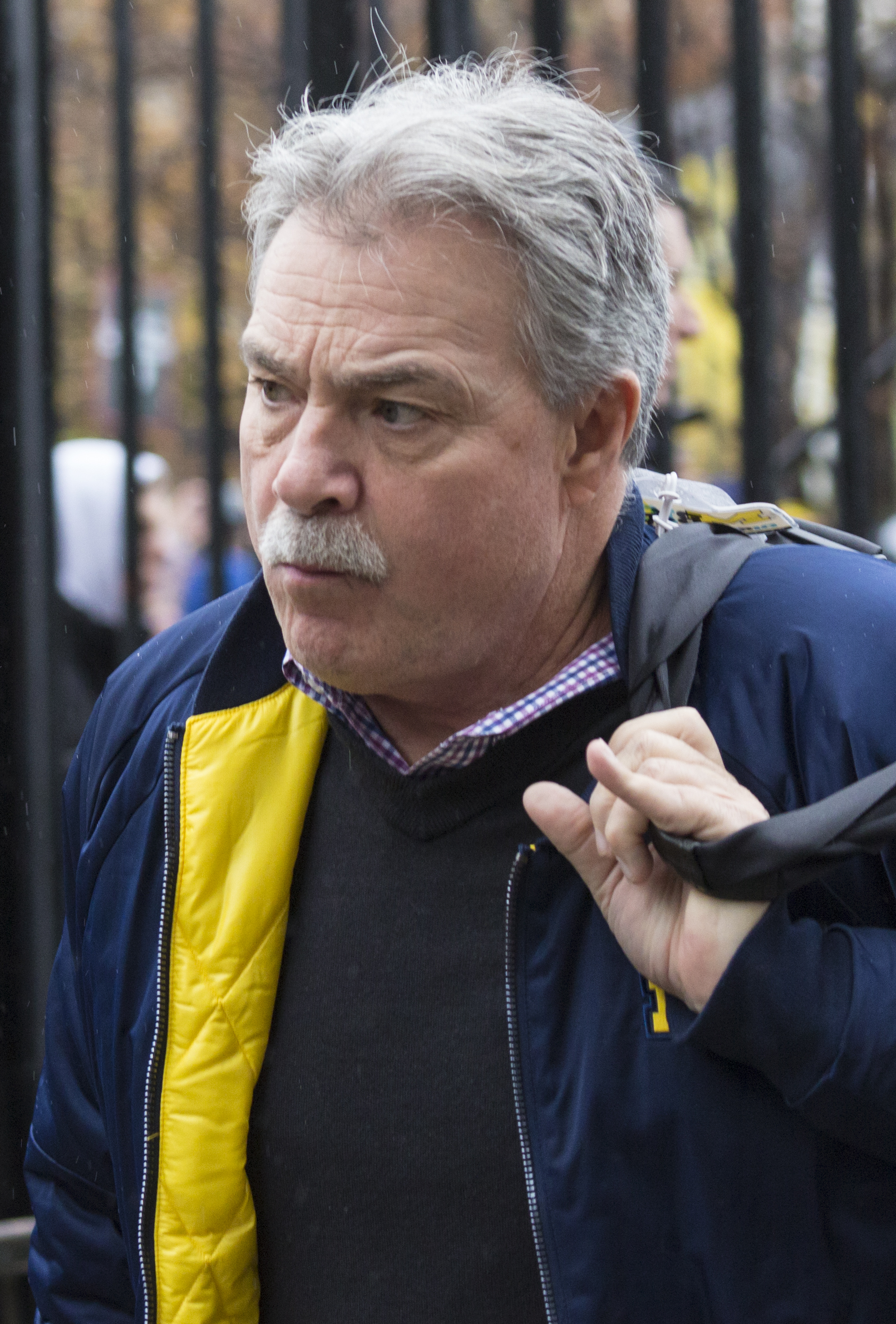
- Brown in 2018

Current position
- Title: Consultant
- Team: Syracuse
- Conference: ACC

Biographical details
- Born: July 31, 1955 (age 71); Spencer, Massachusetts, U.S.

Playing career

Football
- 1973–1976: Norwich
- Position: Fullback

Coaching career (HC unless noted)

Football
- 1977–1981: Hartford HS (VT) (backfield)
- 1982: Dartmouth (GA)
- 1983: Mansfield (DC)
- 1984–1986: Dartmouth (DB)
- 1987–1988: Yale (DB)
- 1989–1992: Yale (DC/DB)
- 1993–1995: Plymouth State
- 1996–1997: Brown (DC)
- 1998–1999: UMass (DC)
- 2000–2003: Northeastern
- 2004–2008: UMass
- 2009–2010: Maryland (DC/CB)
- 2011–2012: Connecticut (DC/CB)
- 2013–2015: Boston College (DC/LB)
- 2016–2020: Michigan (DC)
- 2021: Arizona (DC)
- 2022–2024: UMass
- 2025–present: Syracuse (consultant)

Baseball
- 1977–1978: Hartford HS (VT) (assistant)
- 1979–1981: Hartford HS (VT)
- 1988: Yale (JV)
- 1992: Yale (interim HC)

Basketball
- 1977–1981: Hartford HS (VT) (assistant)

Head coaching record
- Overall: 101–73 (college football); 26–10 (college baseball)
- Bowls: 0–1
- Tournaments: Football; 1–2 (NCAA D-III playoffs); 4–3 (NCAA D-I-AA/FCS playoffs) Baseball; 1–2 (NCAA D-I)

Accomplishments and honors

Championships
- Football; 2 FFC (1994–1995); 1 A-10 (2002); 2 CAA (2006–2007) Baseball; 1 EIBL (1992)

Awards
- Football; 3× AFCA Region I COY (1994, 2002, 2006); 3× Freedom Conference COY (1993–1995); 2× Atlantic 10 COY (2002, 2006)

Donald A. Brown Jr. (born July 31, 1955) is an American college football coach and former player. He was most recently the head football coach for the University of Massachusetts Amherst, a position he held from 2004 to 2008 and again from 2022 to 2024. In between his two stints as UMass, Brown was the defensive coordinator at the University of Maryland, College Park, the University of Connecticut, Boston College, the University of Michigan, and the University of Arizona. He served as the head football coach at Plymouth State University from 1993 to 1995 and Northeastern University from 2000 to 2003. Brown was also the interim head baseball coach at Yale University in 1992, tallying a mark of 26–10.

== Early life and college ==
Brown was born in Spencer, Massachusetts, where he attended David Prouty High School. He went on to play football as a fullback at Norwich University. He served as team captain during his senior season in 1976. Brown graduated in 1977. In 1996, he earned a master's degree from Plymouth State University.

== Coaching career ==
=== Early positions ===
Brown began his coaching career as an assistant football, baseball, and basketball coach for Hartford High School in Hartford, Vermont. In 1979, he was promoted to head baseball coach following the resignation of Bob Potter but still served as an assistant football coach under him. He served as the backfield coach. He resigned from coaching all three sports in 1982 to accept a part-time football position for Dartmouth.

Brown taught physical education while coaching for Hartford.

With Dartmouth, Brown served as a graduate assistant working with the linebackers for one season in 1982. The team won the Ivy League and finished with a 5–5 record. He was hired as the defensive coordinator for Mansfield under first-year head coach Tom Elsasser in 1983. In 1984, he returned to Dartmouth as the team's defensive backs coach. He was fired alongside the rest of the coaching staff aside from one after Joe Yukica was fired. After being highly recommended by Yukica, Brown was hired for the same position for Yale. In 1989, he was promoted to defensive coordinator.

=== Yale baseball ===
In 1988, Brown served as the junior varsity head coach and assistant varsity baseball coach for Yale. After one season he did not retain an official role with the team but occasionally helped with practices throughout his tenure as an assistant football coach.

Brown was named the interim head baseball coach at Yale during the 1992 season after the resignation of long-time head coach Joe Benanto late in the summer. Brown led the Bulldogs to a 26–10 record, including a 14–4 mark in the Eastern Intercollegiate Baseball League (EIBL), the EIBL championship, and a bid to the NCAA tournament. Competing in the Midwest Regional, Yale lost the opener to Clemson, before taking an elimination game against Nicholls State. The Bulldogs were then eliminated by UCLA.

=== Plymouth State ===
In 1993, Brown assumed his first head coaching job at Plymouth State, a Division III school. During his last two years, he led the team to win the Freedom Football Conference (FFC) championship and advanced to the Division III playoffs. Brown was named the FFC Coach of the Year in all three of his seasons at Plymouth State. In 1994, he was also named the American Football Coaches Association District I Coach of the Year.

=== Assistant coach ===
==== Brown and UMass ====
In 1996, he took over as the defensive coordinator at Brown. In his second season, Brown posted its best record (7–5) in 20 years, led the nation with a school record 28 interceptions, and ranked second in takeaways with 36. Opponents scored an average of 19.4 points per game.

In 1998, Brown moved to UMass as its defensive coordinator. That year, UMass won the Division I-AA national championship. In 1999, they earned a share of the Atlantic 10 championship and secured another berth in the Division I-AA playoffs.

=== Northeastern ===
From 2000 to 2003, Brown held his second head coaching job at Northeastern. The season prior to his arrival, the Huskies finished with a 2–9 record. In 2000, Northeastern scored a 35–27 upset victory over Division I-A Connecticut. In 2002, he led Northeastern to an 11th-place final ranking, the school's highest-ever placement. The Huskies' ten wins were also the most in school history. That season, he was named Atlantic 10 Conference Coach of the Year, New England Football Writers Coach of the Year, and American Football Coaches Association Region I Coach of the Year. In 2003, he led the Huskies to a third-place finish in the Atlantic 10, and the eight-win season matched the second-most in school history. Northeastern was the only team to record a victory against Delaware, which went on to become the Division I-AA champions. In 2003 Brown signed a contract with Northeastern through the end of the 2009 football season, but then breached his contract in 2004 to work for UMass.

=== UMass ===
In 2004, Brown returned to UMass to take over as its head coach. During his tenure as head coach from 2004 to 2008, UMass posted the best five-year record in school history, 43–19. In his first year, he led the Minutemen to a 6–5 record, including victories over fourth-ranked Colgate, seventh-ranked New Hampshire, and ninth-ranked Maine. In 2005, Brown led UMass to a 7–2 start and a final ranking of #19. That year, the Minutemen defeated fourth-ranked James Madison and handed Delaware their worst home loss in two decades, 35–7.

In 2006, Brown led Massachusetts to the Atlantic 10 conference championship and a finished as runners-up in the national championship. They ended the season ranked No. 2 with a 13–2 record. At home, he set a school record with a perfect 8–0 record in McGuirk Stadium. That season, Brown was named the AFCA Region I Coach of the Year, Atlantic 10 Coach of the Year, and New England Football Coach of the Year.

In 2007, UMass again won its conference as a member of the Colonial Athletic Association. The team advanced to the semifinals and finished the season with a No. 6 final ranking.

=== Second stint as assistant coach ===
==== Maryland ====
On January 9, 2009, the University of Maryland announced the hiring of Brown as its defensive coordinator, which filled the vacancy created by the departure of Chris Cosh. Maryland paid UMass a $25,000 buyout in accordance with the terms of Brown's contract. With a dearth of experience and talent, especially on the offensive line, Maryland suffered a 2–10 record during the 2009 season. The loss of cornerback Nolan Carroll due to a broken leg was cited as a serious detriment for the defense. The defense struggled to pressure opposing quarterbacks with the implementation of Brown's aggressive, blitz-oriented scheme. Maryland finished tied for last in the Atlantic Coast Conference in scoring defense, allowing an average of 31.2 points per game causing just twelve turnovers, and recording two sacks. The lower-than-expected figures were attributed to a lack of players suited to the defensive scheme.

With a year of experience in Brown's defense and a stronger secondary, the unit was expected to improve during the 2010 season. Maryland rebounded with a 9–4 record and a bowl game victory, with a markedly improved defense. The Washington Post described Brown's scheme as "organized chaos" and "blitzing nearly 85 percent of the time." Highly touted junior safety Kenny Tate emerged as a playmaker, and Brown praised his play at "virtually every position on the field" as "unbelievable". Brown was credited with preparing the team well for the 2010 Military Bowl, where Maryland beat the 12th-ranked offense of East Carolina, 51–20. After the season, head coach Ralph Friedgen was fired, and Brown stated a desire to remain at Maryland on the next coaching staff.

==== Connecticut and Boston College ====
On February 4, 2011, Brown was hired as the defensive coordinator at the University of Connecticut. He kept that position until December 19, 2012, when he was hired to serve the same position at Boston College.

==== Michigan ====
On December 21, 2015, Brown was named defensive coordinator at Michigan under head coach Jim Harbaugh. Brown replaced former defensive coordinator D. J. Durkin, who had departed to take the head coaching job at Maryland. Brown was fired from Michigan on December 22, 2020, after five seasons. Under Brown, Michigan's defense was ranked 2nd (2016), 6th (2017), 8th (2018) and 10th (2019) but dropped to 56th in 2020.

==== Arizona ====
It was announced on January 6, 2021, that Jedd Fisch would name Brown as the defensive coordinator at the University of Arizona. After taking over, he improved Arizona’s defense from the previous 2020 season, which was the 100th-ranked defense, to the 57th-ranked total defense.

=== Second stint at UMass ===
In November 2021 UMass, now an FBS independent, again hired Brown as its head coach. The Minutemen are a combined 4–20 in Brown's two seasons, showing improvement from 1–11 in 2022 to 3–9 in 2023.

On November 18, 2024, Brown was fired after a 2–8 start to the 2024 season and a 6–28 overall record.

=== Third stint as assistant coach ===
==== Syracuse ====
In 2025, Brown began working with the Syracuse Orange football program as a consultant.

==== Franklin High School ====
In 2026, Brown became an assistant coach for the Franklin High School School Varsity Baseball Team. He works for his son Zach Brown who is the head Coach.

== Coaching philosophy ==
Brown is regarded as one of the top defensive minds in the country. He has led FBS programs to close to a dozen top-10 national finishes in total defense, with three of those seasons in the top three. He is known for coaching aggressive, high-energy, hard-hitting defenses. Sometimes nicknamed “Dr. Blitz” for his defenses always being on the attack, he is also known for being a players' coach. He believes in players taking accountability for themselves and each other, and in leaders rising as a result. Brown stresses discipline, technique, and fundamentally sound football.

=== Development ===
Brown is known for maximizing players' potential and developing players to the next level. He has coached over 50 All-Big Ten and numerous other all-conference players. He has coached numerous NFL players and coached seven All-Americans: Devin Bush Jr., Lavert Hill, Chase Winovich, Chris Wormley, and consensus picks Maurice Hurst Jr., Jourdan Lewis, and Jabrill Peppers. At UMass he coached NFL players such as Victor Cruz, James Ihedigbo, Jeremy Cain, Emil Igwenagu, and Vladimir Ducasse.

== Head coaching record ==
=== Head coaching record ===
Year	Team	Overall	Conference	Standing	Bowl/playoffs	Coaches^{#}	AP^{°}
Plymouth State Panthers (Freedom Football Conference) (1993–1995)
1993	Plymouth State	6–4	5–1	2nd	L Northwest		
1994	Plymouth State	10–1	6–0	1st	L NCAA Division III Quarterfinal		
1995	Plymouth State	9–1	7–0	1st	L NCAA Division III First Round		
Plymouth State:		25–6	18–1				
Northeastern Huskies (Atlantic 10 Conference) (2000–2003)
2000	Northeastern	4–7	1–7	10th			
2001	Northeastern	5–6	4–5	6th			
2002	Northeastern	10–3	7–2	T–1st	L NCAA Division I-AA First Round	11	
2003	Northeastern	8–4	6–3	3rd		20	
Northeastern:		27–20	18–17				
UMass Minutemen (Atlantic 10 Conference / Colonial Athletic Association) (2004–2008)
2004	UMass	6–5	4–4	T–2nd (North)			
2005	UMass	7–4	6–2	2nd (North)		19	
2006	UMass	13–2	8–0	1st (North)	L NCAA Division I Championship	2	
2007	UMass	10–3	7–1	1st (North)	L NCAA Division I Quarterfinal	7	
2008	UMass	7–5	4–4	3rd (North)			
UMass Minutemen (NCAA Division I FBS independent) (2022–2024)
2022	UMass	1–11					
2023	UMass	3–9					
2024	UMass	2–8*					
UMass:		49–47	29–11				
Total:		101–73					
National championship Conference title Conference division title or championship game berth
^{#}Ranking from The Sports Network Poll.

- Fired after 10 games.
