= 1995 Plymouth State Panthers football team =

American college football season

1995 Plymouth State Panthers football

FFC champion L NCAA Division III First Round 7–24 vs. Union (NY)
- Conference: Freedom Football Conference
- Record: 9–1 (7–0 FFC)
- Head coach: Don Brown (3rd season)
- Home stadium: Currier Field

1995 Freedom Football Conference standings
	Conf.					Overall
Team	W		L		T	W		L		T
Plymouth State $^	7	–	0	–	0	9	–	1	–	0
Western Connecticut	4	–	2	–	0	7	–	2	–	1
Springfield (MA)	3	–	2	–	0	8	–	2	–	0
Stony Brook	3	–	2	–	0	7	–	3	–	0
WPI	3	–	3	–	0	4	–	5	–	0
Merchant Marine	2	–	3	–	0	5	–	4	–	0
Coast Guard	2	–	4	–	0	4	–	6	–	0
Norwich	2	–	5	–	0	3	–	6	–	0
UMass Lowell	0	–	5	–	0	0	–	10	–	0
$ – Conference champion; ^ – NCAA Division III playoff participant

The 1995 Plymouth State Panthers football team was an American football team that represented Plymouth State University as a member of the Freedom Football Conference (FFC) during the 1995 NCAA Division III football season. In their third year under head coach Don Brown, the Panthers compiled a 9–1 record (7–0 against FFC opponents), won the FFC championship, outscored opponents by a total of 263 to 94, and received a bid to the NCAA Division III playoffs. The team fell to Union (NY) 7–24 in the first round.

The team was led by quarterback Joel Perry who finished the season with 1,238 passing yards, thirteen touchdowns, and twelve interceptions. The team's leading receiver was R. J. Letendre who finished with 29 receptions for 505 yards and four touchdowns.

The team played its home games at Currier Field in Plymouth, New Hampshire.

Following the season nine players earned post-season honors and head coach Don Brown was named the conference's Coach of the Year. The all-conference honors were given to wide receiver R. J. Letendre, quarterback Joel Perry, running back Shawn Redburn, offensive lineman Jeff Ziegler, defensive end Jason Friedman, linebackers Colby Compton and Dave Gibson, cornerback Andy Lavigne, and punt returner Brent Bardellini.

In April 1996, Brown resigned from his post as head coach to accept the defensive coordinator position for Brown. Brown ended his tenure with the team with an eighteen-game regular season win streak. The Panthers hired Cortland offensive coordinator Mike Kemp as his successor.

== Schedule ==
Date	Opponent	Site	Result	Attendance	Source
September 9	UMass Dartmouth*	Currier Field; Plymouth, NH	W 33–0	1,927	
September 23	at Norwich	Sabine Field; Northfield, VT	W 24–21	3,681	
September 30	at UMass Lowell	Lowell, MA	W 52–3	605	
October 7	Western Connecticut	Currier Field; Plymouth, NH	W 36–6	1,129	
October 14	Springfield	Currier Field; Plymouth, NH	W 31–6	4,826	
October 21	at Bridgewater State*	Swenson Field; Bridgewater, MA	W 20–13	600	
October 28	Coast Guard	Currier Field; Plymouth, NH	W 9–2	3,118	
November 4	at Stony Brook	Seawolves Field; Stony Brook, NY	W 20–12	1,417	
November 11	at WPI	Alumni Stadium; Worcester, MA	W 31–7	1,127	
November 18	Union (NY)*	Currier Field; Plymouth, NH (NCAA Division III First Round)	L 7–24		
*Non-conference game
