= 1994 Plymouth State Panthers football team =

American college football season

1994 Plymouth State Panthers football

FFC champion L NCAA Division III Quarterfinal 7–22 vs. Ithaca
- Conference: Freedom Football Conference
- Record: 10–1 (6–0 FFC)
- Head coach: Don Brown (2nd season)
- Home stadium: Currier Field

1994 Freedom Football Conference standings
	Conf.					Overall
Team	W		L		T	W		L		T
Plymouth State +^	6	–	0	–	0	10	–	1	–	0
Merchant Marine +^	5	–	0	–	0	7	–	3	–	0
Stony Brook	4	–	2	–	0	7	–	4	–	0
WPI	3	–	2	–	0	5	–	4	–	0
Coast Guard	2	–	4	–	0	4	–	5	–	0
Norwich	2	–	5	–	0	3	–	6	–	0
Western Connecticut	1	–	5	–	0	1	–	9	–	0
UMass Lowell	0	–	5	–	0	0	–	10	–	0
+ – Conference co-champions; ^ – NCAA Division III playoff participant

The 1994 Plymouth State Panthers football team was an American football team that represented Plymouth State University as a member of the Freedom Football Conference (FFC) during the 1994 NCAA Division III football season. In their second year under head coach Don Brown, the Panthers compiled a 10–1 record (6–0 against FFC opponents), won the FFC championship, outscored opponents by a total of 343 to 162, and received a bid to the NCAA Division III playoffs. The team beat Merchant Marine 19–18 before falling to Ithaca 7–22 in the quarterfinal.

The team was led by quarterback Joel Perry who finished the season with 1,758 passing yards, seventeen touchdowns, and only four interceptions. The team's leading receiver was R. J. Letendre who finished with 37 receptions for 792 yards and seven touchdowns. Against WPI, he amassed 291 receiving yards and 408 all-purpose yards.

The team played its home games at Currier Field in Plymouth, New Hampshire.

Following the season seven players earned post-season honors and head coach Don Brown was named the conference's Coach of the Year. The all-conference honors were given to wide receiver R. J. Letendre, quarterback Joel Perry, offensive lineman Brandon Hourigan, guard John Podgorni, defensive end John Morley, linebacker Colby Compton, and placekicker Paul D'Ascoli. Joel Perry and Colby Compton were also named Offensive and Defensive Player of the Year respectively.

== Schedule ==
Date	Opponent	Site	Result	Attendance	Source
September 10	at UMass Dartmouth*	Cressy Field; Dartmouth, MA	W 35–0	1,143	
September 17	Norwich	Currier Field; Plymouth, NH	W 40–17	1,312	
October 1	UMass Lowell	Currier Field; Plymouth, NH	W 30–0	5,246	
October 8	at Western Connecticut	New Haven, CT	W 28–19	1,025	
October 15	Maine Maritime*	Currier Field; Plymouth, NH	W 49–14	2,816	
October 22	Bridgewater State*	Currier Field; Plymouth, NH	W 40–6	5,816	
October 29	at Coast Guard	Cadet Memorial Field; New London, CT	W 20–14	2,500	
November 5	Stony Brook	Currier Field; Plymouth, NH	W 37–31	1,500–3,718	
November 12	WPI	Currier Field; Plymouth, NH	W 38–21	3,157	
November 19	Merchant Marine*	Currier Field; Plymouth, NH (NCAA Division III First Round)	W 19–18	4,782	
November 26	at Ithaca*	South Hill Field; Ithaca, NY (NCAA Division III Quarterfinal)	L 7–22		
*Non-conference game
