= 1928 Brooklyn City College football team =

American college football season

1928 Brooklyn City College football

Metropolitan champion
- Conference: Metropolitan Collegiate Conference
- Record: 5–2–1 (3–0–1 Metropolitan)
- Head coach: Lou Oshins (2nd season)
- Home stadium: Lewisohn Stadium

1928 Metropolitan Collegiate Conference football standings
	Conf.					Overall
Team	W		L		T	W		L		T
Brooklyn City College $	3	–	0	–	1	5	–	2	–	1
Long Island	2	–	1	–	1	5	–	3	–	1
Cooper Union	2	–	2	–	0	2	–	6	–	0
Wagner College	1	–	2	–	1	1	–	3	–	1
New York Aggies	0	–	3	–	1	1	–	5	–	1
$ – Conference champion

The 1928 Brooklyn City College football team represented Brooklyn City College—now known as Brooklyn College—as a member of the Metropolitan Collegiate Conference during the 1928 college football season. Led by second-year head coach Lou Oshins, Brooklyn City College compiled an overall record of 5–2–1 with a mark of 3–0–1 in conference play, winning the Metropolitan Collegiate Conference title. The team played home games at Lewisohn Stadium in Manhattan.

== Schedule ==
Date	Opponent	Site	Result	Source
September 29	at Upsala*	Ashland Field; East Orange, NJ	L 0–18	
October 6	at Junior College of Connecticut*	Bridgeport, CT	W 12–6	
October 13	at Wagner College	Sutter Field; Staten Island, NY	W 14–13	
October 20	at Long Island	Hawthorne Field; Brooklyn, NY	T 0–0	
October 27	at Rider*	Trenton, NJ	W 13–6	
November 3	CCNY JV*	Lewisohn Stadium; New York, NY	L 0–10	
November 17	at New York Aggies	Farmingdale, NY	W 12–0	
November 24	Cooper Union	Lewisohn Stadium; New York, NY	W 19–0	
*Non-conference game
