= Liberty Football Conference =

Defunct NCAA Division III athletic conference

The Liberty Football Conference was an NCAA Division III football-only conference that existed from 1985 to 1992. The league a total of nine members, all located in the state of New York.

== Members ==
Institution	Location	Nickname	Founded	Joined	Left	Conference joined
C. W. Post–Long Island University	Brookville, New York	Pioneers	1954	1985	1992	NCAA Division II independent
Fordham University	Bronx, New York	Rams	1841	1985	1988	NCAA Division I-AA independent
Iona College	New Rochelle, New York	Gaels	1940	1985	1992	Metro Atlantic Athletic Conference
Marist College	Poughkeepsie, New York	Red Foxes	1929	1992	1992	NCAA Division I-AA independent
Pace University	New York, New York	Setters	1906	1985	1992	NCAA Division II independent
St. John's University	Queens, New York	Redmen	1870	1985	1992	Metro Atlantic Athletic Conference
Stony Brook University	Stony Brook, New York	Patriots	1957	1988	1991	Freedom Football Conference
United States Merchant Marine Academy	Kings Point, New York	Mariners	1943	1985	1991	Freedom Football Conference
Wagner College	Staten Island, New York	Seahawks	1883	1992	1992	NCAA Division II independent

== Champions ==
- 1985 – Merchant Marine
- 1986 – Merchant Marine
- 1987 – Fordham
- 1988 – Fordham and C. W. Post
- 1989 – St. John's (NY)
- 1990 – C. W. Post
- 1991 – St. John's (NY)
- 1992 – Wagner

== Standings ==
1985 Liberty Football Conference standings
	Conf.					Overall
Team	W		L		T	W		L		T
Merchant Marine $	5	–	0	–	0	8	–	3	–	0
C. W. Post	4	–	1	–	0	7	–	2	–	0
Fordham	2	–	3	–	0	6	–	5	–	0
St. John's	2	–	3	–	0	5	–	5	–	0
Pace	2	–	3	–	0	3	–	7	–	0
Iona	0	–	5	–	0	0	–	11	–	0
$ – Conference champion

1986 Liberty Football Conference standings
	Conf.					Overall
Team	W		L		T	W		L		T
Merchant Marine $	4	–	1	–	0	8	–	2	–	0
Fordham	3	–	1	–	1	4	–	5	–	1
St. John's	3	–	2	–	0	6	–	4	–	0
Pace	2	–	2	–	1	5	–	4	–	1
C. W. Post	2	–	3	–	0	2	–	7	–	0
Iona	0	–	5	–	0	0	–	11	–	0
$ – Conference champion

1987 Liberty Football Conference standings
	Conf.					Overall
Team	W		L		T	W		L		T
Fordham $	5	–	0	–	0	9	–	1	–	0
Merchant Marine	3	–	2	–	0	4	–	5	–	0
Iona	2	–	3	–	0	5	–	4	–	0
St. John's	2	–	3	–	0	5	–	5	–	0
C. W. Post	2	–	3	–	0	2	–	8	–	0
Pace	1	–	4	–	0	3	–	6	–	0
$ – Conference champion

1988 Liberty Football Conference standings
	Conf.					Overall
Team	W		L		T	W		L		T
Fordham +	5	–	1	–	0	9	–	2	–	0
C. W. Post +	5	–	1	–	0	5	–	5	–	0
Stony Brook	4	–	2	–	0	5	–	4	–	0
St. John's	3	–	3	–	0	5	–	5	–	0
Iona	2	–	4	–	0	3	–	6	–	0
Pace	1	–	5	–	0	3	–	7	–	0
Merchant Marine	1	–	5	–	0	2	–	8	–	0
+ – Conference co-champions

1989 Liberty Football Conference standings
	Conf.					Overall
Team	W		L		T	W		L		T
St. John's $	5	–	0	–	0	9	–	1	–	0
Iona	4	–	1	–	0	8	–	2	–	0
Merchant Marine	2	–	3	–	0	5	–	4	–	0
C. W. Post	2	–	3	–	0	5	–	5	–	0
Stony Brook	1	–	4	–	0	3	–	7	–	0
Pace	1	–	4	–	0	1	–	9	–	0
$ – Conference champion

1990 Liberty Football Conference standings
	Conf.					Overall
Team	W		L		T	W		L		T
C. W. Post $	5	–	0	–	0	7	–	3	–	0
Merchant Marine	4	–	1	–	0	6	–	3	–	0
St. John's	3	–	2	–	0	5	–	5	–	0
Iona	2	–	3	–	0	5	–	5	–	0
Stony Brook	1	–	4	–	0	1	–	8	–	0
Pace	0	–	5	–	0	1	–	9	–	0
$ – Conference champion

1991 Liberty Football Conference standings
	Conf.					Overall
Team	W		L		T	W		L		T
St. John's $	4	–	1	–	0	6	–	4	–	0
Iona	3	–	1	–	1	7	–	2	–	1
C. W. Post	3	–	2	–	0	4	–	6	–	0
Stony Brook	2	–	3	–	0	6	–	4	–	0
Merchant Marine	1	–	3	–	1	2	–	6	–	1
Pace	1	–	4	–	0	2	–	8	–	0
$ – Conference champion

1992 Liberty Football Conference standings
	Conf.					Overall
Team	W		L		T	W		L		T
Wagner $	5	–	0	–	0	8	–	2	–	0
St. John's	3	–	2	–	0	5	–	5	–	0
C. W. Post	2	–	2	–	1	6	–	3	–	1
Marist	2	–	2	–	1	4	–	5	–	1
Iona	2	–	3	–	0	5	–	5	–	0
Pace	0	–	5	–	0	1	–	9	–	0
$ – Conference champion

== See also ==
- List of defunct college football conferences
