= NCAA Division I FCS independent schools =

US institutions whose football programs are not part of a conference

- Association: NCAA
- Founded: 1978; 48 years ago
- Sports fielded: 1; men's: 1
- Division: Division I
- Subdivision: FCS
- No. of teams: 2 (1 in 2027)
- Website: ncaa.com/independents

NCAA Division I Football Championship Subdivision independent schools are four-year institutions in the United States whose football programs are not members of a football conference. This means that FCS independents are not required to schedule each other for competition as conference schools do.

As of the upcoming 2026 season, two FCS programs will compete as independents:

- Merrimack has competed as an independent since 2024, when they left the football-sponsoring Northeast Conference (now officially known as NEC) to join the Metro Conference, which does not sponsor football.
- Chicago State, a full NEC member, will play its first season of varsity football in 2026 as an FCS independent, before joining NEC football in 2027.

== Current FCS independents ==
Institution	Location	Founded	First	Joined	Type	Enrollment	Nickname	Colors	Primary conference
Chicago State University	Chicago, Illinois	1867	2026		Public	2,620	Cougars		NEC
Merrimack College	North Andover, Massachusetts	1947	1996	2024	Private (Augustinian)	5,505	Warriors		Metro

== Former FCS independents ==
The following is a complete list of teams that have been Division I-AA/FCS Independents since the formation of Division I-AA in 1978. The "Current Conference" column indicates affiliations for the 2026 college football season. The years listed in this table are football seasons; since football is a fall sport, this means that the final season of independent status, or membership in a given conference, is the calendar year before a conference change took effect.

Teams in italics are current FBS members; this includes second-year transitional schools that are counted as FBS for scheduling purposes but not bowl game eligibility. Because James Madison met FBS scheduling requirements in its first season in the Sun Belt Conference in 2022 (specifically five home games against FBS opposition), it was allowed to skip the first year of the normal two-year process.

Years	Team	Previous conference	Conference joined	Current conference
2013	Abilene Christian	Lone Star (Div. II)	Southland (2014–2020)	United (2023–present) (Note: The "United Athletic Conference" name has been used by two separate entities. The first is a football-only alliance between the all-sports Atlantic Sun Conference and Western Athletic Conference that operated in the 2023–2025 seasons, with full WAC members Abilene Christian and Tarleton State competing. The second is the all-sports conference that operated from 1962–2026 as the Western Athletic Conference, which adopted the United Athletic Conference name in July 2026. Both Abilene Christian and Tarleton State remain members of the all-sports UAC.)
1987–1991	Arkansas State	Southland	Division I-A Independent (1992)	Sun Belt (2001–present) (Note: Arkansas State has been a full Sun Belt member since 1991, but the conference did not sponsor football until 2001.)
1997–2000	Austin Peay	Ohio Valley (Note: Austin Peay only departed OVC football; it remained a full but non-football member before returning to OVC football in 2007.)	Pioneer Football League (2001–2005)	United (2023–present) (Note: As part of the 2026 reorganization of the alliance between the Atlantic Sun and Western Athletic Conferences that led to the latter's 2026 rebranding as the United Athletic Conference, the five legacy ASUN members with scholarship-granting FCS programs, all of which had competed in the football-only United Athletic Conference from 2023–2025, moved to the all-sports UAC for 2026 and beyond.)
2006	Austin Peay	Pioneer Football League	Ohio Valley (2007–2021)	United (2023–present)
1978–1985	Bucknell	Division II Independent	Patriot League (1986–present) (Note: The conference now known as the Patriot League began in 1986 as the football-only Colonial League. It adopted its current name in 1990, when it became an all-sports conference.)	
1993–1998	Buffalo	Division III Independent	Mid-American Conference (1999–present) (Note: Buffalo became a full member of the MAC in 1998, but was not a football member until 1999.)	
1996–2003	Cal Poly	American West	Great West (2004–2011) (Note: The Great West Conference began in 2004 as the Great West Football Conference. It became an all-sports conference in 2008.)	Big Sky (2012–present)
2001	Cal State Northridge	Big Sky	Dropped football	
2006	Central Arkansas	Gulf South (Div. II)	Southland (2007–2020)	United (2023–present)
1993–1995	Central Connecticut	Division II Independent	NEC (1996–present)	
1993–2001	Charleston Southern	No football program	Big South (2002–2022)	Ohio Valley (2026–present)
2013–2014	Charlotte	No football program	CUSA (2015–2022)	American (2023–present)
2016	Coastal Carolina	Big South	Sun Belt (2017–present) (Note: Coastal Carolina joined the Sun Belt Conference as a full but non-football member in 2016, and joined Sun Belt football in 2017.)	
1982–1985	Colgate	Division I-A Independent	Patriot League (1986–present)	
1989	Davidson	Colonial League	Division III Independent (1990–1992)	
1993–2000	Davidson	Division III Independent	Pioneer Football League (2001–present)	
1980–1985	Delaware	Division II Independent	Yankee Conference (1986–1996)	Conference USA (2025–present) (Note: Delaware had been a full member of the Coastal Athletic Association from 2001 to 2024 (when that conference was known as the Colonial Athletic Association). However, the CAA did not sponsor football until 2007, when it effectively took over the football league previously sponsored by the Atlantic 10 Conference (A-10), establishing the separate entity of CAA Football to govern that sport.) (Note: CAA Football is the direct successor of both the Yankee Conference and A-10 football conference. The football-only Yankee Conference was absorbed by the A-10 after the 1996 season. After the 2006 season, the A-10 dropped football after all of its football members joined the newly formed CAA Football. The Yankee Conference's automatic bid to the I-AA/FCS playoffs passed in succession to the A-10 and CAA Football.) (Note: Delaware begun its transition to FBS in 2024 and joined Conference USA in 2025.)
1993	Duquesne	Division III Independent	MAAC (1994–2007)	NEC (2008–present)
2015	East Tennessee State	No football program (Note: ETSU resurrected its football program, dormant since the end of the 2003 season, in 2015, playing that season as an independent before joining Southern Conference football in 2016.)	Southern (2016–present) (Note: ETSU, which had previously been a Southern Conference member from 1978 to 2005, rejoined the SoCon in 2014, initially as a non-football member.)	
1984–1986	Eastern Washington	Division II Independent	Big Sky (1987–present)	
1998–2001	Elon	Division II Independent	Big South (2002)	CAA Football (2014–present)
1984–1987	Florida A&M	MEAC (Note: Florida A&M was a member of the MEAC in 1986 & 1987, but games played did not count as conference games.)	MEAC (1988–2003, 2005–2020)	SWAC (2021–present)
2004	Florida A&M	MEAC (Note: Florida A&M was a member of the MEAC in 2004, but games played did not count as conference games)	MEAC (2005–2020)	SWAC (2021–present)
2002–2004	FIU	No football program	Sun Belt (2005–2012)	CUSA (2013–present)
2001–2004	Florida Atlantic	No football program	Sun Belt (2005–2012)	American (2023–present)
1989	Fordham	Liberty Football Conference	Patriot League (1990–present)	
2000	Georgetown	MAAC	Patriot League (2001–present)	
1984–1991	Georgia Southern	Club football	Southern (1992–2013)	Sun Belt (2014–present)
2010–2011	Georgia State	No football program	CAA Football (2012)	Sun Belt (2013–present)
2018	Hampton	MEAC	Big South (2019–2021)	CAA Football (2022–present)
1991–2000	Hofstra	Division III Independent	Atlantic 10 (2001–2006)	Dropped football
1982–1985	Holy Cross	Division I-A Independent	Patriot League (1986–present)	
2013	Houston Christian (Note: Known before 2022 as Houston Baptist.)	No football program	Southland (2014–present)	
2008	Iona	MAAC (1993–2007)	Dropped football	
2013	Incarnate Word	Lone Star (Div. II)	Southland (2014–present)	
1982–1985	Indiana State	Division I-A Independent	MVFC (1997–present) (Note: The MVFC did not adopt its current name until 2008. Before then, it was known as the Gateway Collegiate Athletic Conference (1982–1993) and Gateway Football Conference (1993–2008).)	
1998–2000	Jacksonville	No football program	Pioneer Football League (2001–2019)	Dropped football
1980–1992	James Madison	Division III Independent	Yankee Conference (1993–1996)	Sun Belt (2022–present)
2023	Kennesaw State	ASUN	CUSA (2024–present)	
1978–1985	Lafayette	Division II Independent	Patriot League (1986–present)	
1987–1989	Lamar	Southland	Dropped program (1989–2009)	
2010	Lamar	No football program	Southland (2011–2020)	Southland (2022–present)
1997–1998	La Salle	No football program (1942–1996)	MAAC (1999–2007)	Dropped football
1978–1985	Lehigh	Division II Independent	Patriot League (1986–present)	
1988–2001	Liberty	Division II Independent	Big South (2002–2017) (Note: Liberty became a full member of the Big South in 1991, remaining a member until joining the non-football ASUN Conference in 2018, but the Big South did not sponsor football until 2002.)	CUSA (2023–present) (Note: Liberty began a transition to FBS in the 2017 season, and became a full FBS member in 2019.)
1987–1988	Louisiana Tech	Southland	Division I-A Independent (1989–1992)	Sun Belt (2026–present)
1993	Marist	Liberty Football Conference	MAAC (1994–2007)	
2008	Marist	MAAC	Pioneer Football League (2009–present)	
1993–1995	Monmouth	No football program	NEC (1996–2012)	CAA Football (2022–present)
2013	Monmouth	NEC	Big South (2014–2021)	CAA Football (2022–present)
1996–2000	Morehead State	Ohio Valley	Pioneer Football League (2001–present)	
2001–2002	Morris Brown	SIAC (Div. II)	Dropped football	
1978	Nevada	Division II Independent	Big Sky (1979–1991)	Mountain West (2012–present)
1980–1983	Nicholls	Division II Independent	Gulf Star (1984–1986)	Southland (1992–present)
1987–1990	Nicholls	Gulf Star	Southland (1991–present)	
2018	North Alabama	Gulf South (Div. II)	Big South (2019–2021)	United (2023–present)
2018–2019	North Dakota	Big Sky	MVFC (2020–present)	
1978–1992	Northeastern	Division II Independent	Yankee (1993–1996)	Dropped football (2010)
2003	Northern Colorado	North Central	Great West (2004–2005)	Big Sky (2006–present)
1978–1983	Northwestern State	Division I Independent	Gulf Star (1984–1986)	Southland (1987–present)
2009–2010	Old Dominion	No football program	CAA Football (2011–2012)	
2013	Old Dominion	CAA Football	CUSA (2014–2021)	Sun Belt (2022–present)
1978–1980	Portland State	Division II Independent	Division II Independent (1981)	Big Sky (1996–present)
2020	Presbyterian	Big South Conference	Pioneer Football League (2021–present)	
1982–1985	Richmond	Division I-A Independent	Yankee Conference (1986–1996)	Patriot League (2025–present)
1994–1995	Robert Morris	No football program	Northeast (1996–2019)	NEC (2024–present)
2024–2025	Sacred Heart	Northeast	CAA Football (2026–present)	
1993–1995	Saint Francis (PA)	Division III Independent	NEC (1996–2025)	Presidents' (Div. III; 2026–present)
1998–1999	St. John's	MAAC	Northeast (2000–2002)	Dropped football (2003)
1993–2003	Saint Mary's	Division II Independent	Dropped football (2004)	
1989–2002	Samford	Division III Independent	Ohio Valley (2003–2007)	Southern (2008–present)
2002–2009	Savannah State	Division II Independent	MEAC (2010–2018)	SIAC (Div. II; 2019–present)
2011	South Alabama	Unclassified (exhibition only)	Sun Belt (2012–present) (Note: South Alabama has been a Sun Belt member from the conference's creation in 1976. However, the Sun Belt did not sponsor football until 2001. South Alabama did not start a football program until 2009, and did not play Sun Belt football until 2012.)	
1997–2000	South Florida	No football program	Division I-A Independent (2001–2002)	American (2013–present) (Note: The original Big East Conference split into the football-sponsoring American Athletic Conference, since renamed the American Conference, and a new non-football Big East Conference in 2013. South Florida remained with the FBS schools in the American.)
1980–1983	Southeastern Louisiana	Division II Independent	Gulf Star (1984–1985)	Southland (2005–present)
2003–2004	Southeastern Louisiana	No football program (Note: Southeastern Louisiana dropped football after the 1985 season.)	Southland (2005–present)	
1996–2003	Southern Utah	American West	Great West (2004–2011)	Big Sky (2026–present)
2007	Stony Brook	Northeast	Big South (2008–2012)	CAA Football (2013–present)
2020	Tarleton State	Lone Star (Division II)	WAC (2021–2022)	United (2023–present)
1981–1987	Tennessee State	Division I-A Independent	Ohio Valley (1988–2022)	OVC–Big South (2023–present)
1987–1996	Towson	Division II Independent	Patriot League (1997–2003)	CAA Football (2007–present) (Note: Towson was a CAA member at the conference's formation in 1979, but left in 1981; after having been a member of four other conferences, it rejoined the CAA in 2001. However, the CAA did not sponsor football until 2007, when it effectively took over the football league previously sponsored by the Atlantic 10 Conference (A-10), establishing the separate entity of CAA Football to govern that sport.)
1993–1995	Troy	Division II Independent	Southland (1996–2000)	
2001	Troy	Southland	Division I-A Independent (2002–2003)	Sun Belt (2004–present) (Note: Troy joined the Sun Belt for football in 2004, and became an all-sports member in 2005.)
1993–1995	UAB	Division III Independent	Division I-A Independent (1996–1998)	American (2023–present)
1990–1995	UCF	Division II Independent	Division I-A Independent (1996–2001)	Big 12 (2023–present)
2020	Utah Tech (Note: Known before 2022 as Dixie State.)	RMAC (Division II)	WAC (2021–2022)	Big Sky (2026–present)
2011	UTSA	No football program	WAC (2012)	American (2023–present)
1987	Villanova	No football program	Yankee Conference (1988–1996)	Patriot League (2026–present)
1993–1995	Wagner	Liberty Football Conference	NEC (1996–present)	
1982–1998	Western Kentucky	Ohio Valley	Ohio Valley (1999–2000)	
2007–2008	Western Kentucky	Gateway Football Conference	Sun Belt (2009–2013)	CUSA (2014–present)
1982–1992	William & Mary	Division I-A Independent	Yankee Conference (1993–1996)	Patriot League (2026–present)
1995–1996	Wofford	Division II Independent	Southern (1997–present)	
2006	Winston–Salem State	CIAA (Div. II)	MEAC (2007–2009)	CIAA (Div. II) (2010–present)
1988–1996	Youngstown State	Ohio Valley	MVFC (1997–present)	

== See also ==
- List of NCAA Division I FCS football programs
- NCAA Division I FBS independent schools
- NCAA Division I independent schools
- NCAA Division II independent schools
- NCAA Division III independent schools
- NAIA independent schools
