= 1995 NCAA Division III football season =

American college football season

- Regular season: August – November 1995
- Playoffs: November – December 1995
- National championship: Salem Football Stadium; Salem, VA
- Champion: Wisconsin–La Crosse (2)
- Gagliardi Trophy: Chris Palmer (WR), St. John's

The 1995 NCAA Division III football season, part of the college football season organized by the NCAA at the Division III level in the United States, began in August 1995, and concluded with the NCAA Division III Football Championship, also known as the Stagg Bowl, in December 1995 at Salem Football Stadium in Salem, Virginia. The Wisconsin–La Crosse Eagles won their second Division III championship by defeating the Rowan Profs, 36−7. The Gagliardi Trophy, given to the most outstanding player in Division III football, was awarded to Chris Palmer, wide receiver from St. John's (MN).

== Conference changes and new programs ==
School	1994 Conference	1995 Conference
Albany	D-III Independent	D-II Independent
Gallaudet	D-III Independent	Club Program

== Conference standings ==
1995 Association of Mideast Colleges football standings
	Conf.					Overall
Team	W		L		T	W		L		T
Thomas More $	3	–	0	–	0	10	–	0	–	0
Mount St. Joseph	1	–	2	–	0	5	–	4	–	0
Bluffton	1	–	2	–	0	5	–	5	–	0
Wilmington (OH)	1	–	2	–	0	2	–	6	–	1
$ – Conference champion

1995 Centennial Conference football standings
	Conf.					Overall
Team	W		L		T	W		L		T
Franklin & Marshall $	6	–	1	–	0	7	–	3	–	0
Dickinson	5	–	1	–	1	7	–	2	–	1
Johns Hopkins	4	–	2	–	1	6	–	3	–	1
Western Maryland	3	–	2	–	2	5	–	3	–	2
Gettysburg	3	–	3	–	1	5	–	4	–	1
Swarthmore	3	–	4	–	0	5	–	5	–	0
Ursinus	1	–	6	–	0	3	–	7	–	0
Muhlenberg	0	–	6	–	1	0	–	9	–	1
$ – Conference champion

1995 College Conference of Illinois and Wisconsin football standings
	Conf.					Overall
Team	W		L		T	W		L		T
Wheaton (IL) $^	7	–	0	–	0	10	–	1	–	0
Illinois Wesleyan	6	–	1	–	0	6	–	3	–	0
Augustana (IL)	5	–	2	–	0	6	–	3	–	0
Millikin	3	–	4	–	0	5	–	4	–	0
Carthage	2	–	4	–	1	3	–	5	–	1
Elmhurst	2	–	5	–	0	2	–	7	–	0
North Central (IL)	1	–	5	–	1	3	–	5	–	1
North Park	1	–	6	–	0	2	–	7	–	0
$ – Conference champion; ^ – NCAA Division III playoff participant

1995 Eastern Collegiate Football Conference standings
	Conf.					Overall
Team	W		L		T	W		L		T
Stonehill $	8	–	0	–	0	9	–	1	–	0
Bentley	7	–	1	–	0	9	–	1	–	0
Salve Regina	6	–	2	–	0	7	–	2	–	0
Assumption	5	–	3	–	0	6	–	4	–	0
MIT	3	–	4	–	0	3	–	5	–	0
Sacred Heart	2	–	4	–	0	3	–	7	–	0
Western New England	2	–	6	–	0	2	–	6	–	0
Curry	1	–	7	–	0	2	–	8	–	0
Nichols	0	–	7	–	0	0	–	9	–	0
$ – Conference champion

1995 Freedom Football Conference standings
	Conf.					Overall
Team	W		L		T	W		L		T
Plymouth State $^	7	–	0	–	0	9	–	1	–	0
Western Connecticut	4	–	2	–	0	7	–	2	–	1
Springfield (MA)	3	–	2	–	0	8	–	2	–	0
Stony Brook	3	–	2	–	0	7	–	3	–	0
WPI	3	–	3	–	0	4	–	5	–	0
Merchant Marine	2	–	3	–	0	5	–	4	–	0
Coast Guard	2	–	4	–	0	4	–	6	–	0
Norwich	2	–	5	–	0	3	–	6	–	0
UMass Lowell	0	–	5	–	0	0	–	10	–	0
$ – Conference champion; ^ – NCAA Division III playoff participant

1995 Illini–Badger Football Conference standings
	Conf.					Overall
Team	W		L		T	W		L		T
Eureka $	6	–	0	–	0	9	–	1	–	0
Concordia (WI)	4	–	2	–	0	7	–	2	–	0
Lakeland	4	–	2	–	0	6	–	3	–	1
Quincy	4	–	2	–	0	4	–	6	–	0
Greenville	2	–	4	–	0	2	–	7	–	0
MacMurray	1	–	5	–	0	3	–	7	–	0
Concordia (IL)	0	–	6	–	0	1	–	8	–	0
$ – Conference champion; ^ – NAIA Division II playoff participant

1995 Indiana Collegiate Athletic Conference football standings
	Conf.					Overall
Team	W		L		T	W		L		T
Hanover $^	6	–	0	–	0	10	–	1	–	0
Rose–Hulman	4	–	2	–	0	6	–	4	–	0
Franklin (IN)	3	–	3	–	0	6	–	4	–	0
Manchester	3	–	3	–	0	4	–	6	–	0
Anderson (IN)	2	–	4	–	0	6	–	4	–	0
Wabash	2	–	4	–	0	5	–	5	–	0
DePauw	1	–	5	–	0	3	–	7	–	0
$ – Conference champion; ^ – NCAA Division III playoff participant

1995 Iowa Conference football standings
	Conf.					Overall
Team	W		L		T	W		L		T
Central (IA) $^	8	–	0	–	0	10	–	1	–	0
Wartburg	7	–	1	–	0	9	–	1	–	0
Simpson (IA)	6	–	2	–	0	7	–	3	–	0
Loras	5	–	3	–	0	7	–	3	–	0
Upper Iowa	4	–	4	–	0	3	–	6	–	0
Buena Vista	2	–	6	–	0	2	–	7	–	0
Dubuque	2	–	6	–	0	2	–	8	–	0
Luther	2	–	6	–	0	2	–	8	–	0
William Penn	0	–	8	–	0	0	–	10	–	0
$ – Conference champion; ^ – NCAA Division III playoff participant

1995 Michigan Intercollegiate Athletic Association football standings
	Conf.					Overall
Team	W		L		T	W		L		T
Albion $	5	–	0	–	0	8	–	1	–	0
Adrian	3	–	2	–	0	6	–	3	–	0
Alma	3	–	2	–	0	6	–	3	–	0
Kalamazoo	3	–	2	–	0	4	–	5	–	0
Hope	1	–	4	–	0	2	–	7	–	0
Olivet	0	–	5	–	0	3	–	6	–	0
$ – Conference champion

1995 Middle Atlantic Conference football standings
	Conf.					Overall
Team	W		L		T	W		L		T
Commonwealth
Widener x^	5	–	0	–	0	8	–	3	–	0
Albright	4	–	1	–	0	8	–	3	–	0
Moravian	2	–	2	–	1	7	–	2	–	1
Juniata	1	–	3	–	1	2	–	7	–	1
Susquehanna	1	–	4	–	0	5	–	5	–	0
Lebanon Valley	1	–	4	–	0	3	–	7	–	0
Freedom
Wilkes x	3	–	1	–	0	9	–	2	–	0
Lycoming x^	3	–	1	–	0	8	–	3	–	0
Fairleigh Dickinson–Florham	2	–	2	–	0	4	–	5	–	0
Delaware Valley	1	–	3	–	0	3	–	7	–	0
King's (PA)	1	–	3	–	0	1	–	9	–	0
x – Division champion/co-champions; ^ – NCAA Division III playoff participant

1995 Midwest Conference football standings
	Conf.					Overall
Team	W		L		T	W		L		T
North Division
Ripon xy	4	–	1	–	0	8	–	2	–	0
Beloit	4	–	1	–	0	8	–	1	–	0
Carroll (WI)	4	–	1	–	0	6	–	3	–	0
Lawrence	2	–	3	–	0	4	–	5	–	0
St. Norbert	1	–	4	–	0	1	–	8	–	0
Lake Forest	0	–	5	–	0	0	–	9	–	0
South Division
Cornell (IA) xy$	5	–	0	–	0	9	–	1	–	0
Coe	4	–	1	–	0	7	–	3	–	0
Knox	3	–	2	–	0	6	–	3	–	0
Grinnell	2	–	3	–	0	4	–	5	–	0
Illinois College	1	–	4	–	0	2	–	7	–	0
Monmouth (IL)	0	–	5	–	0	0	–	9	–	0
Championship: Cornell (IA) 38, Ripon 17
$ – Conference champion; x – Division champion/co-champions; y – Championship game participant

1995 Minnesota Intercollegiate Athletic Conference football standings
	Conf.					Overall
Team	W		L		T	W		L		T
Saint John's (MN) +	7	–	1	–	1	8	–	1	–	1
Concordia–Moorhead +^	7	–	1	–	1	8	–	2	–	1
Hamline	6	–	3	–	0	7	–	3	–	0
St. Thomas (MN)	6	–	3	–	0	6	–	4	–	0
Augsburg	5	–	4	–	0	6	–	4	–	0
Bethel (MN)	5	–	4	–	0	6	–	4	–	0
St. Olaf	4	–	5	–	0	5	–	5	–	0
Carleton	3	–	6	–	0	3	–	7	–	0
Gustavus Adolphus	1	–	8	–	0	1	–	9	–	0
Macalester	0	–	9	–	0	1	–	9	–	0
+ – Conference co-champions; ^ – NCAA Division III playoff participant

1995 New England Football Conference standings
	Conf.					Overall
Team	W		L		T	W		L		T
Worcester State $	8	–	0	–	0	9	–	2	–	0
Maine Maritime	6	–	2	–	0	7	–	2	–	0
Massachusetts Maritime	6	–	2	–	0	7	–	2	–	0
Bridgewater State	6	–	2	–	0	6	–	4	–	0
UMass Dartmouth	3	–	5	–	0	4	–	6	–	0
Westfield State	3	–	5	–	0	3	–	6	–	0
Framingham State	2	–	6	–	0	2	–	7	–	0
UMass–Boston	1	–	7	–	0	2	–	7	–	0
Fitchburg State	1	–	7	–	0	1	–	8	–	0
$ – Conference champion

1995 New England Small College Athletic Conference football standings
	Conf.					Overall
Team	W		L		T	W		L		T
Williams	7	–	0	–	1	7	–	0	–	1
Trinity (CT)	6	–	2	–	0	6	–	2	–	0
Amherst	5	–	2	–	1	5	–	2	–	1
Colby	5	–	3	–	0	5	–	3	–	0
Hamilton	5	–	3	–	0	5	–	3	–	0
Tufts	4	–	4	–	0	4	–	4	–	0
Wesleyan	3	–	5	–	0	3	–	5	–	0
Middlebury	2	–	6	–	0	2	–	6	–	0
Bates	1	–	7	–	0	1	–	7	–	0
Bowdoin	1	–	7	–	0	1	–	7	–	0
No conference champion recognized

1995 New Jersey Athletic Conference football standings
	Conf.					Overall
Team	W		L		T	W		L		T
Rowan $^	5	–	0	–	0	10	–	3	–	1
Trenton State	4	–	1	–	0	8	–	3	–	0
Kean	3	–	2	–	0	3	–	4	–	2
Montclair State	2	–	3	–	0	3	–	6	–	0
Jersey City State	1	–	4	–	0	1	–	9	–	0
William Paterson	0	–	5	–	0	0	–	10	–	0
$ – Conference champion; ^ – NCAA Division III playoff participant

1995 North Coast Athletic Conference football standings
	Conf.					Overall
Team	W		L		T	W		L		T
Wittenberg $^	7	–	0	–	0	10	–	1	–	0
Allegheny	7	–	1	–	0	9	–	1	–	0
Ohio Wesleyan	6	–	2	–	0	6	–	4	–	0
Wooster	5	–	3	–	0	5	–	5	–	0
Kenyon	3	–	4	–	1	3	–	6	–	1
Denison	2	–	5	–	1	2	–	7	–	1
Earlham	2	–	6	–	0	3	–	7	–	0
Case Western Reserve	1	–	5	–	0	2	–	8	–	0
Oberlin	0	–	7	–	0	0	–	10	–	0
$ – Conference champion; ^ – NCAA Division III playoff participant

1995 Ohio Athletic Conference football standings
	Conf.					Overall
Team	W		L		T	W		L		T
Mount Union $^	9	–	0	–	0	12	–	1	–	0
Marietta	7	–	1	–	1	8	–	1	–	1
John Carroll	5	–	2	–	2	6	–	2	–	2
Baldwin–Wallace	6	–	3	–	0	6	–	4	–	0
Muskingum	5	–	3	–	1	6	–	3	–	1
Ohio Northern	4	–	5	–	0	5	–	5	–	0
Hiram	3	–	6	–	0	4	–	6	–	0
Otterbein	3	–	6	–	0	3	–	7	–	0
Capital	1	–	8	–	0	1	–	9	–	0
Heidelberg	0	–	9	–	0	0	–	10	–	0
$ – Conference champion; ^ – NCAA Division III playoff participant

1995 Old Dominion Athletic Conference football standings
	Conf.					Overall
Team	W		L		T	W		L		T
Emory & Henry $^	5	–	0	–	0	9	–	2	–	0
Randolph–Macon	4	–	1	–	0	6	–	3	–	1
Washington and Lee	3	–	2	–	0	5	–	3	–	1
Hampden–Sydney	2	–	3	–	0	4	–	6	–	0
Guilford	1	–	4	–	0	3	–	6	–	0
Bridgewater	0	–	5	–	0	0	–	9	–	1
$ – Conference champion; ^ – NCAA Division III playoff participant

1995 Presidents' Athletic Conference football standings
	Conf.					Overall
Team	W		L		T	W		L		T
Washington & Jefferson $^	4	–	0	–	0	10	–	1	–	0
Bethany (WV)	3	–	1	–	0	6	–	3	–	0
Waynesburg	2	–	2	–	0	5	–	4	–	0
Grove City	1	–	3	–	0	2	–	8	–	0
Thiel	0	–	4	–	0	0	–	10	–	0
$ – Conference champion; ^ – NCAA Division III playoff participant

1995 Southern California Intercollegiate Athletic Conference football standings
	Conf.					Overall
Team	W		L		T	W		L		T
La Verne $	6	–	0	–	0	9	–	0	–	0
Pomona-Pitzer	4	–	2	–	0	6	–	3	–	0
Cal Lutheran	4	–	2	–	0	4	–	4	–	1
Redlands	3	–	3	–	0	4	–	5	–	0
Claremont-Mudd	2	–	4	–	0	3	–	6	–	0
Occidental	2	–	4	–	0	3	–	6	–	0
Whittier	0	–	6	–	0	1	–	8	–	0
$ – Conference champion

1995 Southern Collegiate Athletic Conference football standings
	Conf.					Overall
Team	W		L		T	W		L		T
Trinity (TX) +	3	–	1	–	0	6	–	3	–	0
Centre +	3	–	1	–	0	5	–	4	–	1
Rhodes +	3	–	1	–	0	4	–	5	–	0
Sewanee	1	–	3	–	0	3	–	6	–	0
Millsaps	0	–	4	–	0	2	–	7	–	0
+ – Conference co-champions

1995 Wisconsin State University Conference football standings
	Conf.					Overall
Team	W		L		T	W		L		T
Wisconsin–La Crosse $^	7	–	0	–	0	14	–	0	–	0
Wisconsin–River Falls ^	6	–	1	–	0	9	–	3	–	0
Wisconsin–Stevens Point	5	–	2	–	0	8	–	2	–	0
Wisconsin–Whitewater	4	–	3	–	0	7	–	3	–	0
Wisconsin–Platteville	3	–	4	–	0	5	–	5	–	0
Wisconsin–Oshkosh	2	–	5	–	0	5	–	5	–	0
Wisconsin–Stout	1	–	6	–	0	3	–	7	–	0
Wisconsin–Eau Claire	0	–	7	–	0	1	–	9	–	0
$ – Conference champion; ^ – NCAA Division III playoff participant

1995 NCAA Division III independents football records
	Conf.			Overall
Team	W	L	T	W		L		T
Chapman		–		8	–	1	–	0
Buffalo State ^		–		9	–	2	–	0
Salisbury State		–		7	–	2	–	0
Wesley		–		8	–	3	–	0
Catholic University		–		6	–	2	–	1
Cortland		–		6	–	3	–	1
Ferrum		–		6	–	4	–	0
Frostburg State		–		6	–	4	–	0
Maryville (TN)		–		5	–	5	–	0
Methodist		–		5	–	5	–	0
Ithaca		–		5	–	4	–	0
Brockport		–		4	–	5	–	1
Alfred		–		4	–	5	–	0
Hartwick		–		4	–	5	–	0
Aurora		–		3	–	6	–	0
Colorado College		–		3	–	6	–	0
Defiance		–		2	–	7	–	0
Menlo		–		0	–	9	–	0
^ – NCAA Division III playoff participant

== Conference champions ==
Conference champions
- Association of Mideast Colleges‡ – Thomas More
- Centennial Conference – Franklin & Marshall
- College Conference of Illinois and Wisconsin – Wheaton (IL)
- Freedom Football Conference – Plymouth State
- Indiana Collegiate Athletic Conference – Hanover
- Iowa Intercollegiate Athletic Conference – Central (IA)
- Michigan Intercollegiate Athletic Association – Albion
- Middle Atlantic Conference – Widener
- Midwest Conference – Cornell (IA)
- Minnesota Intercollegiate Athletic Conference – Concordia–Moorhead and Saint John's (MN)
- New England Football Conference – Worcester State
- New Jersey Athletic Conference – Rowan
- North Coast Athletic Conference – Wittenberg
- Ohio Athletic Conference – Mount Union
- Old Dominion Athletic Conference – Emory & Henry
- Presidents' Athletic Conference – Washington & Jefferson
- Southern California Intercollegiate Athletic Conference – La Verne
- Southern Collegiate Athletic Conference – Centre, Rhodes, and Trinity (TX)
- Texas Intercollegiate Athletic Association – Hardin–Simmons and Howard Payne
- University Athletic Association – Carnegie Mellon and Washington–Saint Louis
- Upper Midwest Athletic Conference – Northwestern–St. Paul
- Upstate Collegiate Athletic Conference – Union (NY)
- Wisconsin Intercollegiate Athletic Conference – Wisconsin–La Crosse

== Postseason ==
The 1995 NCAA Division III Football Championship playoffs were the 23rd annual single-elimination tournament to determine the national champion of men's NCAA Division III college football. The championship Stagg Bowl game was held at Salem Football Stadium in Salem, Virginia for the second time. Salem remained the yearly host of the Stagg Bowl until 2017, with the game moving to Shenandoah, Texas in 2018 and 2019. Like the previous ten tournaments, this year's bracket featured sixteen teams.

=== Playoff bracket ===
Regionals; Campus Sites
Mount Union	52
Hanover	18
Wheaton (IL)	63
Wittenberg	41
Wisconsin–La Crosse	45
Concordia–Moorhead	7
Wisconsin–River Falls	10
Central (IA)	7
Washington & Jefferson	35
Emory & Henry	16
Lycoming	31
Widener	27
Rowan	46
Buffalo State	7
Union (NY)	24
Plymouth State	7

Quarterfinals; Campus Sites
Mount Union	40
Wheaton (IL)	14
Wisconsin–La Crosse	28
Wisconsin–River Falls	14
Washington & Jefferson	48
Lycoming	0
Rowan	38
Union (NY)	7

Semifinals; Campus Sites
Mount Union	17
Wisconsin–La Crosse	20
Washington & Jefferson	15
Rowan	28

National Championship Game; Salem Football Stadium; Salem, Virginia
Wisconsin–La Crosse	36
Rowan	7

== See also ==
- 1995 NCAA Division I-A football season
- 1995 NCAA Division I-AA football season
- 1995 NCAA Division II football season
