= Osin =

Osin is a surname. Notable people with the surname include:

- Denis Osin (fl. 1999–present), American mathematician
- Roman Osin (born 1961), British cinematographer
