= Metropolitan Conference (1923–1931) =

College football conference in New York state

The Metropolitan Conference was an intercollegiate athletic conference that existed from 1923 to 1931. It has been one of ten athletics conferences with this name although the only one to sponsor a football championship. The league had members in the state of New York.

== Champions ==
- 1923 – St. John's (NY)
- 1924 – Unknown
- 1925 – Unknown
- 1926 – Unknown
- 1927 – Unknown
- 1928 – Unknown
- 1929 – St. John's (NY)
- 1930 – St. John's (NY)
- 1931 – Unknown

== See also ==
- Metropolitan New York Conference
- List of defunct college football conferences
