= Lou Oshins =

American football player and coach

Biographical details
- Born: c. 1902
- Died: August 6, 1975 (aged 73); Belize

Playing career
- 1922–1924: CCNY
- Position: Halfback

Coaching career (HC unless noted)
- 1927–1947: Brooklyn City College / Brooklyn

Head coaching record
- Overall: 54–93–13

Accomplishments and honors

Championships
- 1 Metropolitan Collegiate Conference (1928)

Louis R. Oshins (c. 1902– August 6, 1975) was an American college football coach. He served as the head football coach at Brooklyn College from the inception of the school's football program in 1927 thought the 1947 season.

Oshins played football at the City College of New York (CCNY). He died of cancer on died on August 6, 1975, at his home in Belize.

== Head coaching record ==
Year	Team	Overall	Conference	Standing	Bowl/playoffs
Brooklyn City College (Independent) (1927)
1927	Brooklyn City College	1–2–2			
Brooklyn City College (Metropolitan Collegiate Conference) (1928–1929)
1928	Brooklyn City College	5–2–1	3–0–1	1st	
1929	Brooklyn City College	3–4–1	3–1	2nd	
Brooklyn City College / Brooklyn Kingsmen (Independent) (1930–1947)
1930	Brooklyn City College	0–5			
1931	Brooklyn City College	3–4–1			
1932	Brooklyn City College	3–4–1			
1933	Brooklyn	1–5–1			
1934	Brooklyn	3–5–1			
1935	Brooklyn	0–7–1			
1936	Brooklyn	4–5–1			
1937	Brooklyn	7–2			
1938	Brooklyn	3–5			
1939	Brooklyn	2–7			
1940	Brooklyn	2–5			
1941	Brooklyn	1–6			
1942	Brooklyn	3–5–1			
1943	Brooklyn	3–4			
1944	Brooklyn	2–4–1			
1945	Brooklyn	3–3–1			
1946	Brooklyn	3–4			
1947	Brooklyn	2–5			
Brooklyn City College / Brooklyn:		54–93–13	6–1–1		
Total:		54–93–13			
National championship Conference title Conference division title or championship game berth
