= Battle of Long Island (college rivalry) =

College football rivalry between the Hofstra Pride and the Stony Brook Seawolves

- Hofstra Pride Stony Brook Seawolves
- First meeting: February 16, 1973; Hofstra, 103–80
- Latest meeting: February 27, 2025; Stony Brook, 59–56
- Next meeting: January 2, 2027

Statistics
- Total meetings: 37
- All-time series: Hofstra leads, 28–9
- Largest victory: Hofstra, 102–60 (1981)
- Longest win streak: Hofstra, 8 (1993–2001)
- Current win streak: Stony Brook, 3 (2024–present)

The Battle of Long Island refers to a collegiate sports rivalry between the Hofstra Pride and the Stony Brook Seawolves, who both are located on Long Island in the U.S. state of New York. Hofstra University is the largest private university on Long Island and is located in Hempstead, New York in Nassau County, while Stony Brook University is the largest public university in the state of New York by area and is located in Suffolk County. Since 2022, both schools have been members of the Colonial Athletic Association, with Stony Brook playing in the America East Conference from 2001 to 2022.

Until the merger of the LIU Brooklyn and LIU Post athletic programs into the singular LIU Sharks program in 2019, Hofstra and Stony Brook represented the only Division I universities located on Long Island. (Note: Defined here as universities located in Nassau and Suffolk Counties. While Brooklyn (home to LIU's Brooklyn campus and St. Francis Brooklyn) and Queens (home to St. John's) are physically on Long Island, local usage of the term "Long Island" typically excludes those two New York City boroughs. LIU itself bases some sports (most notably basketball) at the Brooklyn campus and others (most notably football) at the Post campus in Nassau County.) The two schools are separated by a distance of 28 miles (45 km).

The sports rivalry has traditionally revolved around men's basketball, with the first meeting between the two schools in 1973. Hofstra first fielded a basketball team in 1935 and joined the East Coast Conference in 1974 when the NCAA created the Division I classification. Stony Brook first fielded a basketball team in 1960 but remained at the Division III level before elevating to Division I in 1999.

Hofstra leads the all-time series 28–9. Hofstra leads the series 17–8 since both schools became Division I in 1999.

The two schools used to play each other every year in football from 1984 to 1990 and 2004 to 2009 as well before Hofstra eliminated its football program in 2009. When Hofstra dropped football, Stony Brook became the only Division I football team on Long Island until the LIU Post football team, previously Division II, became the D-I LIU team. (Note: At the time of the LIU athletic merger, only the Post campus sponsored football; the Brooklyn campus dropped the sport after the 1940 season (before the Post campus existed). St. Francis Brooklyn dropped football after the 1935 season, and St. John's did the same after the 2002 season.)

Locations of Hofstra and Stony Brook.

== Men's basketball ==
=== History ===
Hofstra and Stony Brook first faced off in 1973, with Hofstra winning 103–80. The two schools played every year from 1973 to 1975 before taking a six-year break and playing one game in 1981 and two games in 1982. Then, the matchup did not happen until 1985, when Stony Brook won its first Battle of Long Island 86–75 after Hofstra won all of the first six games. It was the only meeting until 1993. From 1973 to 1997, when Hofstra was in Division I and Stony Brook was in Division III or II, Hofstra won the series 11–1.

Stony Brook moved to Division I in 1999. In the late 1990s, Hofstra was led by head coach Jay Wright, who went on to even greater success at Villanova before retiring in the 2022 offseason, and won back-to-back America East titles at the turn of the century. Future first-round NBA draft pick Speedy Claxton would reach a career-high game with 13 assists in one Battle of Long Island matchup. Upon Hofstra's departure from the America East to the CAA, Stony Brook would take one of the vacant spots in Hofstra's former conference.

Stony Brook won the Battle of Long Island three times in the 2000s, but the rivalry was halted after 2008 and resumed in 2014. Upon the resumption, Hofstra has owned the rivalry again. Jameel Warney scored 22 points to give Stony Brook a 71–68 win in 2015, but then Hofstra won the next six games, including a 96–58 beatdown in 2016. In 2017 Justin Wright-Foreman, who would be drafted by the Utah Jazz in the second round of the 2019 NBA draft, scored 33 points to give Hofstra an 84–81 comeback win. Stony Brook snapped a five-game losing streak in the series with a 79–62 win in 2021.

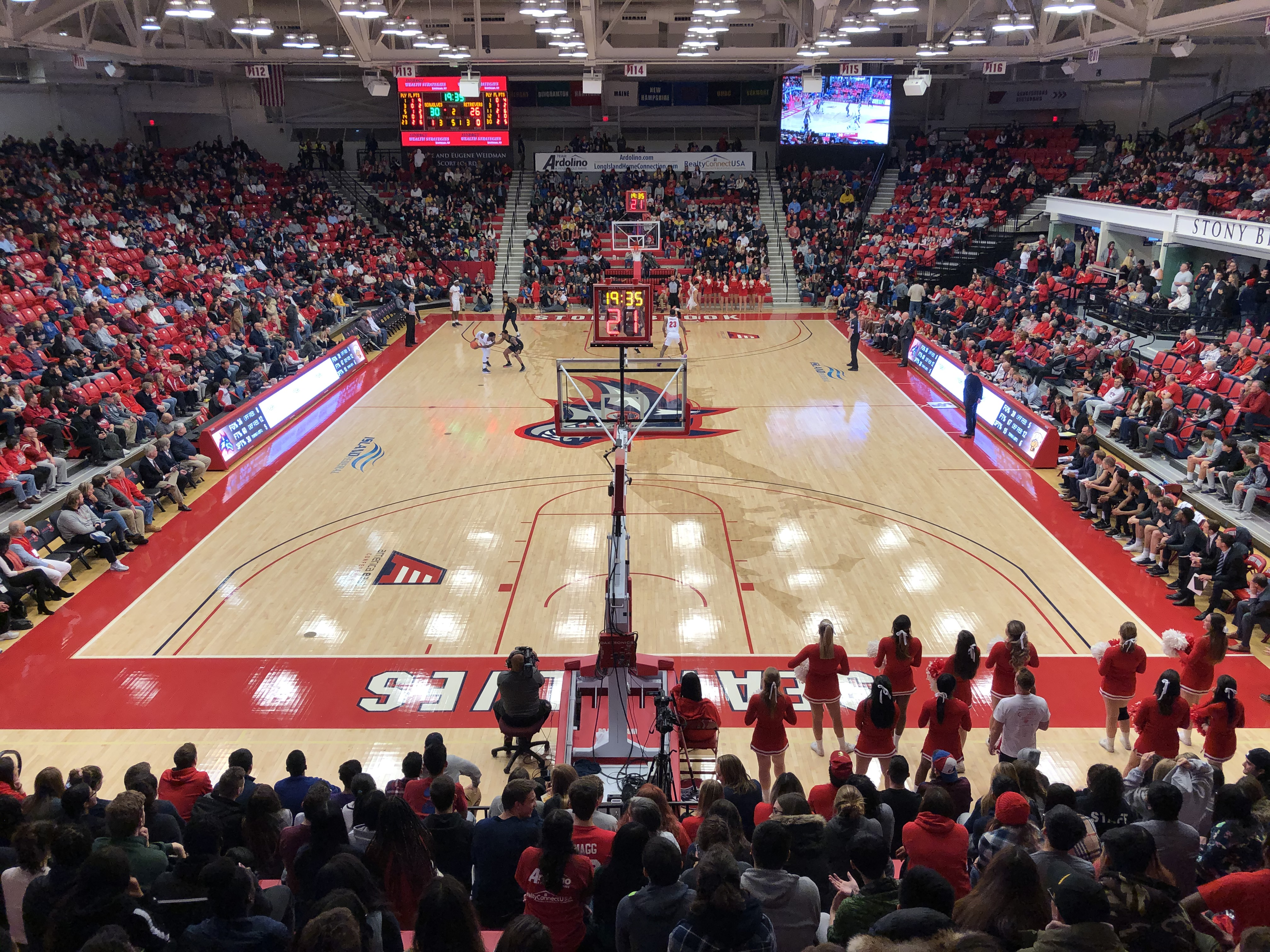
Stony Brook's Island Federal Arena for basketball

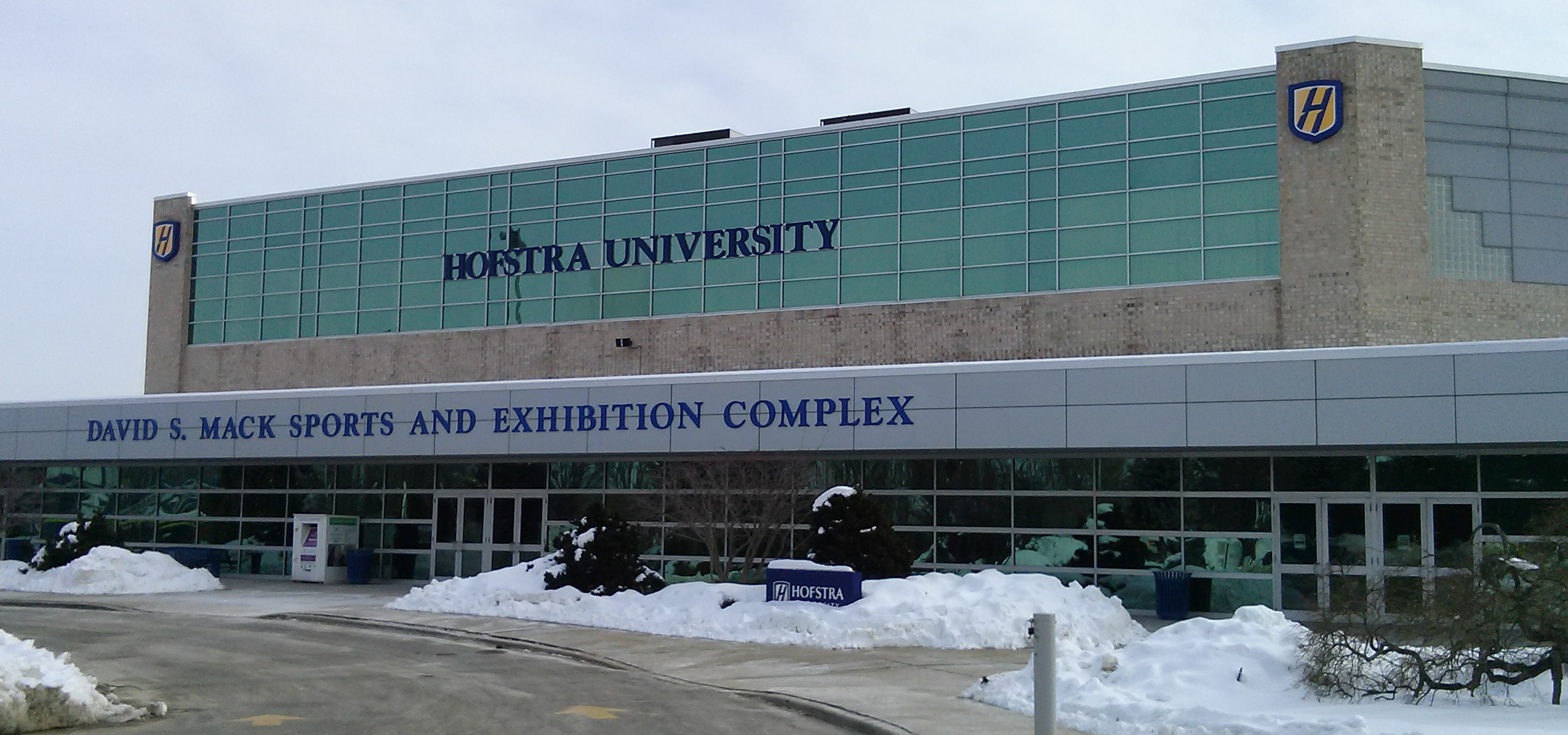
Hofstra's Mack Sports Complex for basketball

=== Game results ===
Hofstra victories	Stony Brook victories

No.	Date	Location	Winner	Score
1	February 16, 1973^{A}	Hempstead, NY	Hofstra	103–80
2	February 19, 1974^{A}	Stony Brook, NY	Hofstra	69–57
3	February 22, 1975^{A}	Hempstead, NY	Hofstra	85–61
4	January 31, 1981^{A}	Hempstead, NY	Hofstra	102–60
5	January 30, 1982^{A}	Hempstead, NY	Hofstra	80–59
6	December 2, 1982^{A}	Stony Brook, NY	Hofstra	97–70
7	November 30, 1985^{A}	Hempstead, NY	Stony Brook	86–75
8	January 30, 1993^{A}	Hempstead, NY	Hofstra	78–57
9	January 19, 1995^{A}	Hempstead, NY	Hofstra	79–60
10	November 28, 1995^{A}	Hempstead, NY	Hofstra	91–72
11	November 22, 1996^{A}	Hempstead, NY	Hofstra	55–42
12	December 20, 1997^{A}	Hempstead, NY	Hofstra	82–59
13	November 27, 1999	Hempstead, NY	Hofstra	68–53
14	November 25, 2000	Stony Brook, NY	Hofstra	72–60
15	December 8, 2001	Hempstead, NY	Hofstra	76–67
16	December 21, 2002	Stony Brook, NY	Stony Brook	65–52
17	December 13, 2003	Hempstead, NY	Stony Brook	70–69
18	December 27, 2004	Stony Brook, NY	Hofstra	66–54
19	December 14, 2005	Hempstead, NY	Hofstra	73–56
20	December 5, 2006	Stony Brook, NY	Hofstra	73–57

No.	Date	Location	Winner	Score
21	December 12, 2007	Hempstead, NY	Stony Brook	77–74
22	December 10, 2008	Stony Brook, NY	Hofstra	61–56
23	November 24, 2014	Hempstead, NY	Hofstra	66–65
24	December 20, 2015	Stony Brook, NY	Stony Brook	71–68
25	December 13, 2016	Hempstead, NY	Hofstra	96–58
26	December 12, 2017	Stony Brook, NY	Hofstra	84–81
27	December 19, 2018	Stony Brook, NY	Hofstra	71–64
28	December 10, 2019	Hempstead, NY	Hofstra	71–63
29	December 9, 2020	Hempstead, NY	Hofstra	72–67
30	December 8, 2021	Stony Brook, NY	Stony Brook	79–62
31	February 4, 2023	Hempstead, NY	Hofstra	79–58
32	February 18, 2023	Stony Brook, NY	Hofstra	68–65
33	January 22, 2024	Stony Brook, NY	Hofstra	80–74
34	February 1, 2024	Hempstead, NY	Hofstra	72–71
35	March 11, 2024	Washington, D.C.	Stony Brook	63–59
36	February 8, 2025	Hempstead, NY	Stony Brook	80–75
37	February 27, 2025	Stony Brook, NY	Stony Brook	59–56
Series: Hofstra leads 28–9
Note:^{A} Before Stony Brook was Division I

== Football ==
Hofstra and Stony Brook played each other in football every season from 1984 to 1990 and from 2004 to 2009, when Hofstra eliminated its football program. Hofstra beat Stony Brook in all 13 of its contests together, often in blowout fashion.

Following the dissolution of Hofstra's football program, running backs Miguel Maysonet and Brock Jackolski both transferred to Stony Brook. Maysonet would become Stony Brook's all-time leading rusher, the 2011 and 2012 Big South Conference Offensive Player of the Year and the runner-up for the 2012 Walter Payton Award behind Old Dominion quarterback Taylor Heinicke, given to the top FCS player in the country. Jackolski would become Stony Brook's fifth all-time leading rusher. He rushed for 1,418 yards in 2011, third-most in a single season at Stony Brook, in the same year that Maysonet ran for 1,633 yards, the second-most in a single season. Maysonet's 1,964 rushing yards in 2012 is the program's single-season record.

=== Game results ===
Hofstra victories	Stony Brook victories

No.	Date	Location	Winner	Score
1	September 21, 1984^{A}	Hempstead, NY	Hofstra	45–0
2	September 20, 1985^{A}	Hempstead, NY	Hofstra	17–15
3	September 20, 1986^{A}	Stony Brook, NY	Hofstra	13–3
4	September 18, 1987^{A}	Hempstead, NY	Hofstra	24–3
5	September 17, 1988^{A}	Stony Brook, NY	Hofstra	8–3
6	September 15, 1989^{A}	Hempstead, NY	Hofstra	28–6
7	September 15, 1990^{A}	Stony Brook, NY	Hofstra	48–0
8	October 9, 2004	Stony Brook, NY	Hofstra	61–21
9	September 17, 2005	Hempstead, NY	Hofstra	55–0
10	August 31, 2006	Stony Brook, NY	Hofstra	17–8
11	September 29, 2007	Hempstead, NY	#14 Hofstra	33–28
12	September 26, 2008	Stony Brook, NY	Hofstra	43–3
13	September 5, 2009	Hempstead, NY	Hofstra	17–10
Series: Hofstra leads 13–0
Note:^{A} Pre-Division I

== Other sports ==
=== Women's basketball ===
Precise date and location data does not exist for many of the earliest contests.

Hofstra victories	Stony Brook victories

No.	Date	Location	Winner	Score
1	1969–70	Unknown	Hofstra	34–24
2	1970–71	Unknown	Hofstra	30–26^{OT}
3	1971–72	Unknown	Hofstra	25–18
4	1973–74	Unknown	Stony Brook	32–21
5	1974–75	Unknown	Stony Brook	52–20
6	1975–76	Unknown	Hofstra	62–56
7	1976–77	Unknown	Hofstra	60–44
8	1978–79	Unknown	Hofstra	84–66
9	March 6, 2006	Hempstead, NY	Hofstra	92–65^{A}
10	December 9, 2006	Stony Brook, NY	Hofstra	82–67
11	December 4, 2007	Hempstead, NY	Stony Brook	64–48
12	December 21, 2009	Hempstead, NY	Hofstra	67–61
13	November 18, 2010	Stony Brook, NY	Hofstra	84–72
14	November 17, 2015	Hempstead, NY	Hofstra	71–66
15	November 14, 2016	Stony Brook, NY	Hofstra	67–64
16	November 14, 2017	Hempstead, NY	Stony Brook	73–49
17	November 13, 2018	Stony Brook, NY	Stony Brook	77–49
18	November 13, 2019	Hempstead, NY	Stony Brook	81–38
19	December 14, 2020	Stony Brook, NY	Stony Brook	63–52
20	January 1, 2023	Hempstead, NY	Stony Brook	67–55
21	February 12, 2023	Stony Brook, NY	Stony Brook	70–60
22	February 2, 2024	Hempstead, NY	Stony Brook	67–49
23	February 16, 2024	Stony Brook, NY	Stony Brook	81–48
24	February 7, 2025	Stony Brook, NY	Stony Brook	47–42
Series: Tied 12–12
Note:^{A} WNIT

=== Men's soccer ===
Hofstra victories	Stony Brook victories

No.	Date	Location	Winner	Score
1	October 26, 1965	Stony Brook, NY	Stony Brook	3–0
2	October 8, 1966	Hempstead, NY	Hofstra	2–1
3	October 17, 1967	Stony Brook, NY	Tie	0–0
4	September 30, 1968	Hempstead, NY	Hofstra	4–1
5	September 19, 1973	Stony Brook, NY	Stony Brook	1–0
6	September 16, 1974	Hempstead, NY	Tie	1–1
7	October 8, 1975	Stony Brook, NY	Stony Brook	4–1
8	October 6, 1976	Hempstead, NY	Hofstra	3–0
9	October 5, 1977	Stony Brook, NY	Hofstra	2–0
10	October 1978	Hempstead, NY	Hofstra	2–0
11	October 3, 1979	Stony Brook, NY	Stony Brook	3–2
12	October 1980	Hempstead, NY	Tie	2–2
13	September 30, 1981	Stony Brook, NY	Stony Brook	4–0
14	September 29, 1982	Hempstead, NY	Hofstra	1–0
15	September 27, 1983	Stony Brook, NY	Tie	1–1
16	1984	Unknown	Hofstra	4–1
17	September 30, 1991	Hempstead, NY	Hofstra	5–1
18	September 30, 1992	Stony Brook, NY	Hofstra	4–0
19	October 3, 1993	Hempstead, NY	Hofstra	2–1

No.	Date	Location	Winner	Score
20	October 5, 1994	Stony Brook, NY	Hofstra	2–0
21	October 26, 2001	Stony Brook, NY	Stony Brook	1–0
22	September 20, 2003	Stony Brook, NY	Hofstra	3–0
23	September 19, 2004	Hempstead, NY	Stony Brook	2–0
24	September 1, 2005	Stony Brook, NY	Hofstra	2–1
25	September 3, 2006	Hempstead, NY	Hofstra	2–1
26	September 7, 2007	Stony Brook, NY	Stony Brook	3–1
27	August 29, 2008	Hempstead, NY	Tie	2–2
28	September 1, 2009	Stony Brook, NY	Hofstra	1–0
29	September 1, 2010	Hempstead, NY	Stony Brook	1–0
30	October 27, 2015	Hempstead, NY	Stony Brook	3–0
31	August 26, 2016	Stony Brook, NY	Hofstra	3–1
32	September 9, 2017	Hempstead, NY	Tie	1–1
33	September 12, 2018	Stony Brook, NY	Hofstra	2–0
34	September 18, 2019	Hempstead, NY	Hofstra	2–1
35	February 28, 2021	Hempstead, NY	Hofstra	4–1
36	August 30, 2021	Stony Brook, NY	Hofstra	1–0
Series: Hofstra leads 20–10–6

=== Women's soccer ===
Current Stony Brook women's soccer head coach Tobias Bischof was hired after spending eight seasons as an assistant coach at Hofstra.

Hofstra victories	Stony Brook victories

No.	Date	Location	Winner	Score
1	1993	Stony Brook, NY	Stony Brook	3–0
2	1994	Stony Brook, NY	Hofstra	4–1
3	1995	Hempstead, NY	Stony Brook	2–1
4	1997	Stony Brook, NY	Hofstra	3–1
5	1998	Hempstead, NY	Stony Brook	2–1^{OT}
6	1999	Stony Brook, NY	Hofstra	3–1
7	October 18, 2000	Hempstead, NY	Hofstra	4–3
8	October 28, 2001	Hempstead, NY	Hofstra	3–2
9	September 10, 2002	Stony Brook, NY	Hofstra	6–0
10	October 14, 2003	Stony Brook, NY	Hofstra	1–0
11	September 18, 2008	Hempstead, NY	Hofstra	1–0^{2OT}
12	September 11, 2015	Hempstead, NY	Hofstra	2–1
13	September 14, 2017	Stony Brook, NY	Hofstra	1–0
14	September 16, 2018	Hempstead, NY	Hofstra	1–0
15	September 8, 2019	Stony Brook, NY	Hofstra	2–1^{OT}
16	February 21, 2021	Hempstead, NY	#23 Hofstra	4–3
17	August 19, 2021	Hempstead, NY	Hofstra	5–1
Series: Hofstra leads 14–3

=== Men's lacrosse ===
Hofstra victories	Stony Brook victories

No.	Date	Location	Winner	Score
1	April 27, 2004	Stony Brook, NY	Stony Brook	9–6
2	April 26, 2005	Hempstead, NY	Hofstra	13–5
3	April 25, 2006	Stony Brook, NY	#2 Hofstra	18–8
4	April 24, 2007	Hempstead, NY	Stony Brook	13–12^{OT}
5	April 22, 2008	Stony Brook, NY	#20 Hofstra	14–13
6	April 21, 2009	Hempstead, NY	#9 Hofstra	12–11
7	March 15, 2016	Stony Brook, NY	Stony Brook	13–5
8	March 21, 2017	Hempstead, NY	#7 Hofstra	11–9
9	February 27, 2018	Stony Brook, NY	Hofstra	14–2
10	February 26, 2019	Hempstead, NY	Stony Brook	11–10
11	February 25, 2020	Stony Brook, NY	Stony Brook	14–11
12	February 27, 2021	Hempstead, NY	Hofstra	20–17
Series: Hofstra leads 7–5

=== Women's lacrosse ===
Hofstra victories	Stony Brook victories

No.	Date	Location	Winner	Score
1	March 29, 2005	Hempstead, NY	#15 Hofstra	16–6
2	April 25, 2006	Stony Brook, NY	Hofstra	16–8
3	April 24, 2007	Hempstead, NY	#17 Hofstra	15–14
4	April 22, 2008	Stony Brook, NY	Stony Brook	14–10
5	March 25, 2009	Hempstead, NY	Hofstra	15–7
6	March 17, 2010	Stony Brook, NY	Hofstra	17–7
7	April 21, 2015	Hempstead, NY	#6 Stony Brook	12–8
8	April 22, 2016	Stony Brook, NY	#7 Stony Brook	16–5
9	April 28, 2017	Hempstead, NY	#4 Stony Brook	19–4
10	March 25, 2021	Stony Brook, NY	#6 Stony Brook	12–8
Series: Tied 5–5
