= St. John's Red Storm football =

Football program that represented St. John's University

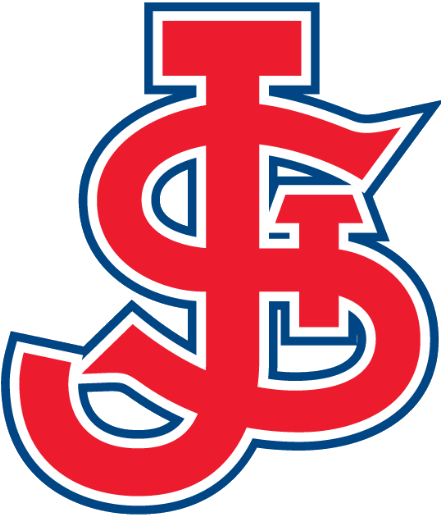
- First season: 1884; 142 years ago
- Last season: 2002; 24 years ago
- Location: Queens, New York
- Stadium: DaSilva Memorial Field (capacity: 1,200)
- NCAA division: Division I-AA
- Conference: Northeast Conference
- Colors: Red and white
- All-time record: 238–192–11 (.552)
- Bowl record: 1–1 (.500)

Conference championships
- 7

The St. John's Red Storm football (formerly the St. John's Redmen) program was the intercollegiate American football team for St. John's University located in New York City, New York. The team competed in the NCAA Division I-AA and were members of the Northeast Conference. The school's first football team was fielded in 1884. St. John's participated in football from 1884 to 2002, compiling an all-time record of 238–192–11.

== History ==
=== Classifications ===
- 1965–1977: N/A
- 1978–1992: NCAA Division III
- 1993–2002: NCAA Division 1-AA

=== Conference memberships ===
St. John's College Football Team 1929

- 1884: Independent
- 1885−1917: No team
- 1918: Independent
- 1919−1922: No team
- 1923−1931: Metropolitan Conference
- 1932−1964: No team
- 1965−1977: Independent
- 1978−1984: Metropolitan Intercollegiate Conference
- 1985−1992: Liberty Football Conference
- 1993−1997: Metro Atlantic Athletic Conference
- 1998−1999: NCAA Division I-AA independent
- 2000−2001: Northeast Conference
- 2002: Metro Atlantic Athletic Conference

== Seasons ==
Year	Team	Overall	Conference	Standing	Bowl/playoffs	TSN/STATS^{#}	Coaches^{°}
St. John's Redmen (Independent / club) (1965–1978)
1965	Anthony Zullo	1–0					
1966	Anthony Zullo	1–5–1					
1967	Anthony Zullo	1–4					
Anthony Zullo:		3–9–1					
1968	Peter Damone; Tom Marshall	4–2					
1969	Peter Damone; Tom Marshall	5–2					
1970	Peter Damone; Tom Marshall	5–3–1					
Peter Damone; Tom Marshall:		14–7–1					
1971	Bob Dell	8–3					
1972	Bob Dell	4–5					
1973	Bob Dell	8–1					
Bob Dell:		20–9					
1974	Bob Ricca	8–2					
1975	Bob Ricca	6–2–1					
1976	Bob Ricca	5–4					
1977	Bob Ricca	4–5					
St. John's Redmen (NCAA Division III Independent) (1978–1979)
1978	Bob Ricca	5–5					
St. John's Redmen (Met-Intercollegiate Conference) (1979–1984)
1979	Bob Ricca	4–5–1					
1980	Bob Ricca	3–7					
1981	Bob Ricca	8–2		1st			
1982	Bob Ricca	9–1		1st			
1983	Bob Ricca	9–2		1st			
1984	Bob Ricca	8–2		1st			
St. John's Redmen (Liberty Football Conference) (1985–1992)
1985	Bob Ricca	5–5					
1986	Bob Ricca	6–4					
1987	Bob Ricca	5–5					
1988	Bob Ricca	5–5					
1989	Bob Ricca	9–2		1st	L ECAC Bowl		
1990	Bob Ricca	5–5					
1991	Bob Ricca	6–4		1st			
1992	Bob Ricca	5–5					
St. John's Red Storm (Metro Atlantic Athletic Conference) (1993–1999)
1993	Bob Ricca	8–3	3–2	3rd			
1994	Bob Ricca	10–1	6–1	T–1st	W ECAC Bowl		
1995	Bob Ricca	4–6	3–4	T–5th			
1996	Bob Ricca	6–4	5–3	4th			
1997	Bob Ricca	8–3	0–0	NA			
1998	Bob Ricca	6–5	4–4	5th			
St. John's Red Storm (NCAA Division I-AA Independent) (1999)
1999	Bob Ricca	7–4					
St. John's Red Storm (Northeast Conference) (2000–2001)
2000	Bob Ricca	5–6	2–6	7th			
2001	Bob Ricca	1–9	1–6	8th			
St. John's Red Storm (Metro Atlantic Athletic Conference) (2002)
2002	Bob Ricca	2–8	2–6	T-7th			
Bob Ricca:		172–121–2					
Total:		256–215–14					
National championship Conference title Conference division title or championship game berth

== Notable former players ==
Notable alumni include:

- Bob Sheppard: Quarterback, Later PA announcer for the New York Yankees

== Championships ==
=== Conference championships ===
Year	Conference	Coach	Overall record	Conference record
1994	Metro Atlantic Athletic Conference (co-championship)	Bob Ricca	10–1	6–1
Total conference championships			1
