= Freedom Football Conference =

Defunct NCAA Division III athletic conference

- Conference: NCAA
- Founded: 1992
- Folded: 2003
- Commissioner: Steve Bamford (1992–2003)
- Sports fielded: Football
- Division: Division III
- No. of teams: 9
- Region: Northeast

The Freedom Football Conference (FFC) was a college athletic conference that competed in the NCAA's Division III. Member teams were located in New England and New York. It was formed in 1992 and disbanded after the 2003 season. As can be deduced from the conference's name, teams competed within the FFC in football only. The teams competed in other conferences in other sports.

== Members ==
- Norwich University (Now in the Eastern Collegiate Football Conference for football only)
- Plymouth State College (Now in the New England Football Conference for football only)
- Springfield College (Now in the Liberty League for football only)
- United States Coast Guard Academy (Now in the New England Football Conference for football only)
- United States Merchant Marine Academy (Now in the Liberty League for football only)
- Western Connecticut State University (Now in the New Jersey Athletic Conference for football only)
- Worcester Polytechnic Institute (Now in the Liberty League for football only)

== Conference champions ==
Season	Champion	Record
1992	WPI	5–0
1993	WPI	5–0
1994	Merchant Marine	5–0
1994	Plymouth State	6–0
1995	Plymouth State	7–0
1996	Coast Guard	5–1
1996	Springfield	5–1
1997	Coast Guard	6–0
1998	Springfield	6–0
1999	Western Connecticut State	6–0
2000	Springfield	6–0
2001	Plymouth State	5–1
2001	Western Connecticut State	5–1
2002	Springfield	6–0
2003	Springfield	6–0

== See also ==
- List of defunct college football conferences
