= Ed Matejkovic =

American football coach at athletic director

Biographical details
- Education: West Chester

Coaching career (HC unless noted)
- 1984–1985: Brockport (OC)
- 1986–1994: Brockport

Administrative career (AD unless noted)
- 1990–1995: Brockport
- 1996–2017: West Chester

Head coaching record
- Overall: 41–68–2
- Bowls: 0–1

Accomplishments and honors

Awards
- Brockport Hall of Fame (2001)

Edward Matejkovic is a retired American football coach at athletic director. He served as the head football coach at The College at Brockport, State University of New York in Brockport, New York from 1986 to 1994, where he completed a record of 41–68–2.

Matejkovic also served as Brockport's athletic director from 1990 to 1995, when he left to become the athletic director at his alma mater, West Chester University in West Chester, Pennsylvania.

== Head coaching record ==
Year	Team	Overall	Conference	Standing	Bowl/playoffs
Brockport Golden Eagles (NCAA Division III independent) (1986–1994)
1986	Brockport	4–6			
1987	Brockport	4–6			
1988	Brockport	4–6			
1989	Brockport	3–7			
1990	Brockport	3–7			
1991	Brockport	5–5			
1992	Brockport	3–7			
1993	Brockport	7–4			L ECAC Northeast
1994	Brockport	6–3–1			
Brockport:		41–68–2			
Total:		41–68–2			
