= 1989 Dayton Flyers football team =

American college football season

1989 Dayton Flyers football

NCAA Division III champion

Stagg Bowl, W 17–7 vs. Union (NY)
- Conference: Independent
- Record: 13–0–1
- Head coach: Mike Kelly (9th season)
- Home stadium: Welcome Stadium

1989 NCAA Division III independents football records
	Conf.			Overall
Team	W	L	T	W		L		T
Dayton ^		–		13	–	0	–	1
Union (NY) ^		–		13	–	1	–	0
Frostburg State		–		9	–	1	–	0
Aurora		–		8	–	1	–	0
Ferrum ^		–		11	–	2	–	0
Cortland ^		–		9	–	2	–	0
Catholic University		–		8	–	2	–	0
UC Santa Barbara		–		8	–	2	–	0
San Diego		–		7	–	2	–	0
Quincy		–		7	–	2	–	1
Hofstra ^		–		8	–	3	–	0
Drake		–		7	–	3	–	0
Wagner		–		6	–	3	–	0
Duquesne		–		6	–	4	–	0
Albany		–		5	–	4	–	0
Canisius		–		5	–	4	–	0
Mercyhurst		–		5	–	4	–	0
Fairleigh Dickinson–Florham		–		4	–	4	–	1
Wesley		–		4	–	5	–	0
Washington (MO)		–		4	–	5	–	0
Buffalo		–		4	–	6	–	0
Maryville (TN)		–		4	–	6	–	0
Menlo		–		3	–	6	–	0
Brockport		–		3	–	7	–	0
Salisbury State		–		2	–	6	–	1
Norwich		–		2	–	7	–	1
Davidson		–		2	–	8	–	0
Georgetown		–		2	–	8	–	0
Western Connecticut State		–		2	–	8	–	0
Buffalo State		–		1	–	8	–	0
Colorado College		–		1	–	8	–	0
Gannon		–		0	–	7	–	0
Saint Peter's		–		0	–	7	–	0
Methodist		–		0	–	10	–	0
Upsala		–		0	–	10	–	0
^ – NCAA Division III playoff participant

The 1989 Dayton Flyers football team was an American football team that represented the University of Dayton as an independent during the 1989 NCAA Division III football season. In their ninth season under head coach Mike Kelly, the Flyers compiled a 13–0–1 record and won the NCAA Division III national championship.

== Schedule ==
Date	Opponent	Site	Result	Attendance	Source
September 9	at Wittenberg	Wittenberg Stadium; Springfield, OH	W 28–3	5,522	
September 16	Davidson	Welcome Stadium; Dayton, OH	W 49–7	4,057–4,067	
September 23	at Butler	Butler Bowl; Indianapolis, IN	T 23–23	3.418	
September 30	Mercyhurst	Welcome Stadium; Dayton, OH	W 49–0	7,026	
October 7	at Catholic University	CUA Stadium; Washington, DC	W 38–14	2,200	
October 14	Georgetown	Welcome Stadium; Dayton, OH	W 27–7	6,972	
October 21	Saint Joseph's^{†}	Welcome Stadium; Dayton, OH	W 39–21	5,925	
October 28	Drake	Welcome Stadium; Dayton, OH	W 38–14	4,083	
November 4	at Valparaiso	Brown Field; Valparaiso, IN	W 55–6	1,004	
November 11	Evansville	Welcome Stadium; Dayton, OH	W 38–0	7,697	
November 18	John Carroll	Welcome Stadium; Dayton, OH (NCAA Division III first round)	W 35–10	3,700	
November 25	Millikin	Welcome Stadium; Dayton, OH (NCAA Division III quarterfinal)	W 28–16	2,500	
December 2	Saint John's (MN)	Welcome Stadium; Dayton, OH (NCAA Division III semifinal)	W 28–0		
December 9	vs. Union (NY)	Garrett-Harrison Stadium; Phenix City, AL (Stagg Bowl–NCAA Division III championship game)	W 17–7	4,000	
^{†}Homecoming
