= Bruce Filosa =

American college athletics administrator and football coach

Coaching career (HC unless noted)

Football
- ?: Sheepshead Bay HS (NY) (assistant)
- 1981–1982: Brooklyn (assistant)
- 1983–1990: Brooklyn

Softball
- 1991–1992: Brooklyn

Administrative career (AD unless noted)
- 1994–2023: Brooklyn

Head coaching record
- Overall: 14–54 (football); 10–46 (softball)

Bruce Filosa is an American retired college athletics administrator and former football coach. He was the athletics director at Brooklyn College from 1994 to 2023. Filosa served as head football coach at Brooklyn College from 1983 through the schools' final season of football in 1990, compiling a record of 14–54. He came to Brooklyn College in 1981 as an assistant football coach after working in the same capacity at Sheepshead Bay High School.

== Head coaching record ==
=== Football ===
Year	Team	Overall	Conference	Standing	Bowl/playoffs
Brooklyn Kingsmen (Metropolitan Intercollegiate Conference) (1983–1984)
1983	Brooklyn	0–10	0–4	5th	
1984	Brooklyn	2–8	1–2	T–2nd	
Brooklyn Kingsmen (NCAA Division III independent) (1986–1987)
1985	Brooklyn	2–6			
1986	Brooklyn	4–6			
1987	Brooklyn	2–7			
Brooklyn Kingsmen (Atlantic Collegiate Football Conference) (1988–1990)
1988	Brooklyn	1–6	1–3	4th	
1989	Brooklyn	1–5	0–5	6th	
1990	Brooklyn	2–6	1–4	T–4th	
Brooklyn:		14–54	3–18		
Total:		14–54			
