= 1989 Buffalo Bulls football team =

American college football season

1989 Buffalo Bulls football
- Conference: Independent
- Record: 4–6
- Head coach: Bill Dando (13th season)
- Captains: Kevin Deakin; Frank Reilly
- Home stadium: Rotary Field

1989 NCAA Division III independents football records
	Conf.			Overall
Team	W	L	T	W		L		T
Dayton ^		–		13	–	0	–	1
Union (NY) ^		–		13	–	1	–	0
Frostburg State		–		9	–	1	–	0
Aurora		–		8	–	1	–	0
Ferrum ^		–		11	–	2	–	0
Cortland ^		–		9	–	2	–	0
Catholic University		–		8	–	2	–	0
UC Santa Barbara		–		8	–	2	–	0
San Diego		–		7	–	2	–	0
Quincy		–		7	–	2	–	1
Hofstra ^		–		8	–	3	–	0
Drake		–		7	–	3	–	0
Wagner		–		6	–	3	–	0
Duquesne		–		6	–	4	–	0
Albany		–		5	–	4	–	0
Canisius		–		5	–	4	–	0
Mercyhurst		–		5	–	4	–	0
Fairleigh Dickinson–Florham		–		4	–	4	–	1
Wesley		–		4	–	5	–	0
Buffalo		–		4	–	6	–	0
Maryville (TN)		–		4	–	6	–	0
Menlo		–		3	–	6	–	0
Brockport		–		3	–	7	–	0
Salisbury State		–		2	–	6	–	1
Norwich		–		2	–	7	–	1
Davidson		–		2	–	8	–	0
Georgetown		–		2	–	8	–	0
Western Connecticut State		–		2	–	8	–	0
Buffalo State		–		1	–	8	–	0
Colorado College		–		1	–	8	–	0
Gannon		–		0	–	7	–	0
Saint Peter's		–		0	–	7	–	0
Methodist		–		0	–	10	–	0
^ – NCAA Division III playoff participant

The 1989 Buffalo Bulls football team represented the University at Buffalo as an independent during the 1989 NCAA Division III football season. Led by Bill Dando in his 13th season as head coach, the team compiled a record of 4–6.

== Schedule ==
Date	Opponent	Site	Result
September 2	John Carroll	Rotary Field; Buffalo, NY	L 15–20
September 9	at Findlay	Findlay, OH	L 3–39
September 16	at Buffalo State	Coyer Field; Buffalo, NY	W 17–9
September 23	at Westminster (PA)	New Wilmington, PA	L 20–34
October 1	Hofstra	Rotary Field; Buffalo, NY	W 17–3
October 7	Canisius	Rotary Field; Buffalo, NY	L 17–31
October 14	at Ithaca	Ithaca, NY	L 10–30
October 21	at Brockport	Brockport, NY	W 35–21
October 28	Mercyhurst	Rotary Field; Buffalo, NY	W 45–27
November 11	at Slippery Rock	Slippery Rock, PA	L 19–24
