= Mike Malet =

American football and lacrosse coach (born 1948)

Biographical details
- Born: February 28, 1948; Poughkeepsie, NY
- Died: May 27, 2022 (aged 74); Rhinebeck, NY

Coaching career (HC unless noted)

Football
- 1970–1977: Marist (assistant)
- 1978–1988: Marist

Lacrosse
- 1984–1990: Marist

Head coaching record
- Overall: 31–68 (football); 47–34 (lacrosse)

Mike Malet was an American former college football and college lacrosse coach. He was the first head football coach for the Marist College football program when it was granted varsity status. The Red Foxes program coached by Ron Levine existed from 1965 to 1977 on the club level. Malet finished his 11-year head football coaching career at Marist by passing the reins over to Rick Pardy with an overall record of 31–68. Malet died on May 27, 2022, in Rhinebeck, New York.

== Head coaching record ==
=== Football ===
Year	Team	Overall	Conference	Standing	Bowl/playoffs
Marist Red Foxes (Metropolitan Intercollegiate Conference) (1978–1984)
1978	Marist	1–8	0–5	6th	
1979	Marist	3–5	1–4	T–4th	
1980	Marist	2–7	2–3	4th	
1981	Marist	2–7	1–3	4th	
1982	Marist	2–7	2–2	3rd	
1983	Marist	3–6	3–1	2nd	
1984	Marist	3–7	2–2	3rd	
Marist Red Foxes (NCAA Division III independent) (1985–1988)
1985	Marist	6–3			
1986	Marist	4–5			
1987	Marist	2–7			
1988	Marist	3–6			
Marist:		31–68	11–20		
Total:		31–68			
