= Rick Pardy =

American football coach (born 1961)

Biographical details
- Born: September 24, 1961 (age 65)
- Education: Ithaca College (1983); University at Albany, SUNY (1985)

Playing career
- 1979–1982: Ithaca
- Position: Offensive lineman

Coaching career (HC unless noted)

Football
- 1983–1984: Albany (DE)
- 1985–1986: Hamilton (DB)
- 1987–1988: Hamilton (DC)
- 1989–1991: Marist
- 1992–1997: Bates
- 1998–2000: Marist (assoc. HC/DC)

Track and field
- 1983–1984: Albany (assistant)
- 1985–1986: Hamilton
- 1992–1997: Bates (assistant)

Head coaching record
- Overall: 19–57–2 (football)

Accomplishments and honors

Championships
- Football; 1 ACFC (1990); 1 Colby-Bates-Bowdoin (1995)

Awards
- As player All ICAC (1982); All-American (1982); NCAA Division III (1979)

Rick Pardy (born September 24, 1961) is an American former college football coach. He was the head football coach for Marist College from 1989 to 1991 and Bates College from 1992 to 1997. With Marist he became the youngest head coach in the NCAA at 27 years old. He led the Marist to the program's first conference championship in 1990 when they finished a perfect 5–0 in Atlantic Central Football Conference (ACFC) play.

Pardy attended Ithaca College where he was an All-American offensive lineman. After his graduation, he was hired as the defensive ends coach for Albany. In 1985, he joined Hamilton where he was hired as the defensive backs coach before being promoted to defensive coordinator in 1987 at only 25 years old. After being the head football coach for Marist and Bates, he returned to Marist as defensive coordinator and associate head coach.

== Head coaching record ==
=== Football ===
Year	Team	Overall	Conference	Standing	Bowl/playoffs
Marist Red Foxes (Atlantic Collegiate Football Conference) (1989–1991)
1989	Marist	4–5–1	3–2	3rd	
1990	Marist	7–2–1	5–0	1st	
1991	Marist	6–4	2–1	2nd	
Marist:		17–11–2	10–3		
Bates Bobcats (Colby-Bates-Bowdoin) (1992–1997)
1992	Bates	0–8	0–2	3rd	
1993	Bates	0–8	0–2	3rd	
1994	Bates	0–8	0–2	3rd	
1995	Bates	1–7	1–1	T–1st	
1996	Bates	0–8	0–2	3rd	
1997	Bates	1–7	1–1	2nd	
Bates:		2–46	2–10		
Total:		19–57–2			
National championship Conference title Conference division title or championship game berth
