= 1988 NCAA Division III football season =

American college football season

- Regular season: August – November 1988
- Playoffs: November – December 1988
- National championship: Garrett-Harrison Stadium; Phenix City, AL
- Champion: Ithaca

The 1988 NCAA Division III football season, part of the college football season organized by the NCAA at the Division III level in the United States, began in August 1988, and concluded with the NCAA Division III Football Championship, also known as the Stagg Bowl, in December 1988 at Garrett-Harrison Stadium in Phenix City, Alabama. The Ithaca Bombers won their third Division III championship by defeating the Central (IA) Dutch, 39−24.

== Conference Changes ==
- The Southern Intercollegiate Athletic Conference upgraded all its teams to Division II this year instead of having teams competing at both the Division II and Division III levels. Miles College, Lane College, and Knoxville College thus upgraded from Division III to Division II.
- The Atlantic Collegiate Football Conference formed with five teams that had formerly competed as either independents or club teams. The conference would be short-lived, lasting until 1991.
- New York Maritime cancelled their season in October of 1988 after playing six games. They would not return to the gridiron until 2005.
- Six schools in Massachusetts upgraded their programs from club teams to varsity in 1988. UMass Boston and Southeastern Massachusetts both joined the NEFC, while Assumption, Bentley, MIT, and Stonehill all joined as independents before joining the ECFC in 1989.

School	1987 Conference	1988 Conference
Assumption	Club Program	D-III Independent
Bentley	Club Program	D-III Independent
Brooklyn	D-III Independent	ACFC
Gallaudet	D-III Independent	ACFC
Maritime	D-III Independent	ACFC
Maryville (TN)	ODAC	D-III Independent
MIT	Club Program	D-III Independent
Saint Peter's	D-III Independent	Cancelled Season
Siena	Club Program	ACFC
St. John Fisher	D-III Independent	ACFC
Stonehill	Club Program	D-III Independent
Southeastern Massachusetts	Club Program	NEFC
Stony Brook	D-III Independent	Liberty
UMass Boston	Club Program	NEFC
Upsala	MAC	D-III Independent

== Conference standings ==
1988 Atlantic Collegiate Football Conference standings
	Conf.					Overall
Team	W		L		T	W		L		T
Gallaudet $	4	–	0	–	0	6	–	3	–	0
St. John Fisher	3	–	1	–	0	5	–	4	–	0
Siena	2	–	2	–	0	3	–	6	–	0
Brooklyn	1	–	3	–	0	1	–	6	–	0
Maritime	0	–	4	–	0	0	–	6	–	0
$ – Conference champion

1988 Centennial Conference football standings
	Conf.					Overall
Team	W		L		T	W		L		T
Dickinson +	6	–	1	–	0	10	–	1	–	0
Franklin & Marshall +	6	–	1	–	0	7	–	3	–	0
Muhlenberg	5	–	2	–	0	7	–	3	–	0
Gettysburg	4	–	3	–	0	4	–	6	–	0
Ursinus	3	–	4	–	0	3	–	7	–	0
Swarthmore	2	–	5	–	0	2	–	8	–	0
Johns Hopkins	1	–	6	–	0	1	–	9	–	0
Western Maryland	1	–	6	–	0	1	–	9	–	0
+ – Conference co-champions

1988 College Athletic Conference football standings
	Conf.					Overall
Team	W		L		T	W		L		T
Rose–Hulman $	4	–	0	–	0	8	–	2	–	0
Rhodes ^	3	–	1	–	0	8	–	2	–	0
Centre	2	–	2	–	0	6	–	3	–	0
Sewanee	1	–	3	–	0	3	–	6	–	0
Earlham	0	–	4	–	0	1	–	8	–	0
$ – Conference champion; ^ – NCAA Division III playoff participant

1988 College Conference of Illinois and Wisconsin football standings
	Conf.					Overall
Team	W		L		T	W		L		T
Augustana (IL) +^	7	–	1	–	0	10	–	2	–	0
Carroll (WI) +	7	–	1	–	0	7	–	2	–	0
Millikin	6	–	2	–	0	7	–	2	–	0
Wheaton (IL)	6	–	2	–	0	7	–	2	–	0
North Central (IL)	3	–	5	–	0	4	–	5	–	0
Carthage	3	–	5	–	0	3	–	6	–	0
Illinois Wesleyan	2	–	6	–	0	2	–	7	–	0
Elmhurst	1	–	7	–	0	1	–	8	–	0
North Park	1	–	7	–	0	1	–	8	–	0
+ – Conference co-champions; ^ – NCAA Division III playoff participant

1988 Independent College Athletic Conference football standings
	Conf.					Overall
Team	W		L		T	W		L		T
Ithaca $^	3	–	0	–	0	13	–	1	–	0
RPI	2	–	0	–	0	7	–	2	–	0
St. Lawrence	2	–	2	–	0	4	–	5	–	0
Alfred	1	–	2	–	0	6	–	2	–	1
Hobart	0	–	4	–	0	0	–	9	–	0
$ – Conference champion; ^ – NCAA Division III playoff participant

1988 Iowa Conference football standings
	Conf.					Overall
Team	W		L		T	W		L		T
Simpson (IA) $^	8	–	0	–	0	9	–	2	–	0
Central (IA) ^	7	–	1	–	0	11	–	2	–	0
Buena Vista	5	–	3	–	0	7	–	3	–	0
Loras	4	–	4	–	0	5	–	5	–	0
Luther	4	–	4	–	0	4	–	6	–	0
Upper Iowa	3	–	5	–	0	4	–	6	–	0
Dubuque	3	–	5	–	0	3	–	7	–	0
Wartburg	2	–	6	–	0	3	–	7	–	0
William Penn	0	–	8	–	0	1	–	9	–	0
$ – Conference champion; ^ – NCAA Division III playoff participant

1988 Liberty Football Conference standings
	Conf.					Overall
Team	W		L		T	W		L		T
Fordham +	5	–	1	–	0	9	–	2	–	0
C. W. Post +	5	–	1	–	0	5	–	5	–	0
Stony Brook	4	–	2	–	0	5	–	4	–	0
St. John's	3	–	3	–	0	5	–	5	–	0
Iona	2	–	4	–	0	3	–	6	–	0
Pace	1	–	5	–	0	3	–	7	–	0
Merchant Marine	1	–	5	–	0	2	–	8	–	0
+ – Conference co-champions

1988 Michigan Intercollegiate Athletic Association football standings
	Conf.					Overall
Team	W		L		T	W		L		T
Adrian +^	4	–	1	–	0	7	–	3	–	0
Alma +	4	–	1	–	0	6	–	3	–	0
Albion	3	–	2	–	0	6	–	3	–	0
Olivet	2	–	2	–	1	4	–	4	–	1
Hope	1	–	4	–	0	1	–	7	–	1
Kalamazoo	0	–	4	–	1	0	–	8	–	1
+ – Conference co-champions; ^ – NCAA Division III playoff participant

1988 Middle Atlantic Conference football standings
	Conf.					Overall
Team	W		L		T	W		L		T
Moravian +^	7	–	1	–	0	10	–	2	–	0
Widener +^	7	–	1	–	0	9	–	2	–	0
Susquehanna	6	–	2	–	0	6	–	4	–	0
Lycoming	5	–	3	–	0	7	–	3	–	0
Juniata	5	–	3	–	0	6	–	3	–	1
Delaware Valley	3	–	5	–	0	5	–	5	–	0
Lebanon Valley	2	–	6	–	0	3	–	6	–	1
Wilkes	1	–	7	–	0	2	–	8	–	0
Albright	0	–	8	–	0	2	–	8	–	0
+ – Conference co-champions; ^ – NCAA Division III playoff participant

1988 Midwest Conference football standings
	Conf.					Overall
Team	W		L		T	W		L		T
North Division
St. Norbert xy$	6	–	0	–	0	8	–	2	–	0
Beloit	4	–	2	–	0	6	–	3	–	0
Lawrence	3	–	3	–	0	6	–	3	–	0
Ripon	2	–	4	–	0	4	–	5	–	0
Lake Forest	0	–	6	–	0	1	–	8	–	0
South Division
Monmouth (IL) xy	7	–	0	–	0	9	–	1	–	0
Knox	4	–	3	–	0	5	–	4	–	0
Cornell (IA)	3	–	3	–	0	3	–	6	–	0
Coe	3	–	4	–	0	3	–	6	–	0
Illinois College	2	–	5	–	0	4	–	5	–	0
Grinnell	1	–	5	–	0	2	–	6	–	0
Championship: St. Norbert 12, Monmouth (IL) 0
$ – Conference champion; x – Division champion/co-champions; y – Championship game participant

1988 Minnesota Intercollegiate Athletic Conference football standings
	Conf.					Overall
Team	W		L		T	W		L		T
Hamline +	8	–	1	–	0	9	–	1	–	0
Concordia–Moorhead +^	8	–	1	–	0	9	–	2	–	0
Saint John's (MN)	7	–	2	–	0	7	–	2	–	0
Carleton	6	–	3	–	0	7	–	3	–	0
Gustavus Adolphus	5	–	4	–	0	6	–	4	–	0
Macalester	3	–	6	–	0	4	–	6	–	0
St. Olaf	3	–	6	–	0	4	–	6	–	0
St. Thomas (MN)	3	–	6	–	0	3	–	7	–	0
Bethel (MN)	1	–	8	–	0	2	–	8	–	0
Augsburg	1	–	8	–	0	1	–	9	–	0
+ – Conference co-champions; ^ – NCAA Division III playoff participant

1988 New England Football Conference standings
	Conf.					Overall
Team	W		L		T	W		L		T
North Division
Plymouth State xy$	6	–	0	–	0	10	–	1	–	0
Lowell	5	–	1	–	0	8	–	1	–	0
Nichols	4	–	2	–	0	6	–	3	–	0
Curry	3	–	3	–	0	5	–	4	–	0
UMass–Boston	2	–	4	–	0	3	–	6	–	0
Western New England	1	–	5	–	0	1	–	8	–	0
Maine Maritime	0	–	6	–	0	2	–	7	–	0
South Division
Worcester State xy	5	–	1	–	0	7	–	3	–	0
Massachusetts Maritime	4	–	2	–	0	5	–	4	–	0
Westfield State	4	–	2	–	0	5	–	4	–	0
Bridgewater State	3	–	3	–	0	5	–	4	–	0
Southeastern Massachusetts	3	–	3	–	0	5	–	4	–	0
Framingham State	2	–	4	–	0	2	–	7	–	0
Fitchburg State	0	–	6	–	0	0	–	9	–	0
Championship: Plymouth State 62, Worcester State 0
$ – Conference champion; x – Division champion/co-champions; y – Championship game participant

1988 New England Small College Athletic Conference football standings
	Conf.					Overall
Team	W		L		T	W		L		T
Williams	6	–	1	–	1	6	–	1	–	1
Trinity (CT)	5	–	1	–	1	5	–	2	–	1
Hamilton	5	–	2	–	0	5	–	3	–	0
Amherst	4	–	3	–	0	4	–	4	–	0
Tufts	4	–	3	–	1	4	–	3	–	1
Colby	4	–	4	–	0	4	–	4	–	0
Wesleyan	3	–	4	–	0	3	–	5	–	0
Bowdoin	2	–	4	–	1	2	–	5	–	1
Middlebury	1	–	6	–	0	1	–	7	–	0
Bates	1	–	7	–	0	1	–	7	–	0
The NESCAC did not recognize an official conference champion until 2000

1988 New Jersey Athletic Conference football standings
	Conf.					Overall
Team	W		L		T	W		L		T
Trenton State $	5	–	1	–	0	8	–	2	–	0
Montclair State	5	–	1	–	0	8	–	2	–	0
Ramapo	4	–	2	–	0	6	–	2	–	0
Glassboro State	3	–	3	–	0	5	–	5	–	0
Kean	2	–	4	–	0	4	–	6	–	0
William Paterson	2	–	4	–	0	3	–	7	–	0
Jersey City State	0	–	6	–	0	2	–	8	–	0
$ – Conference champion

1988 North Coast Athletic Conference football standings
	Conf.					Overall
Team	W		L		T	W		L		T
Allegheny $	6	–	0	–	0	8	–	2	–	0
Case Western Reserve	4	–	2	–	0	7	–	3	–	0
Kenyon	4	–	2	–	0	6	–	4	–	0
Ohio Wesleyan	4	–	2	–	0	6	–	4	–	0
Denison	2	–	4	–	0	3	–	6	–	1
Wooster	1	–	5	–	0	1	–	9	–	0
Oberlin	0	–	6	–	0	1	–	9	–	0
$ – Conference champion

1988 Ohio Athletic Conference football standings
	Conf.					Overall
Team	W		L		T	W		L		T
Baldwin–Wallace +	7	–	1	–	0	8	–	2	–	0
Wittenberg +^	7	–	1	–	0	9	–	3	–	0
Mount Union	5	–	2	–	1	6	–	3	–	1
Heidelberg	5	–	3	–	0	6	–	4	–	0
Capital	4	–	4	–	0	6	–	4	–	0
Muskingum	2	–	5	–	1	4	–	5	–	1
Otterbein	2	–	6	–	0	3	–	7	–	0
Ohio Northern	2	–	6	–	0	3	–	7	–	0
Marietta	1	–	7	–	0	2	–	8	–	0
+ – Conference co-champions; ^ – NCAA Division III playoff participant

1988 Old Dominion Athletic Conference football standings
	Conf.					Overall
Team	W		L		T	W		L		T
Emory & Henry $	4	–	0	–	0	8	–	2	–	0
Hampden–Sydney	2	–	2	–	0	6	–	4	–	0
Washington and Lee	1	–	2	–	1	5	–	3	–	1
Randolph–Macon	1	–	2	–	1	5	–	4	–	1
Bridgewater	1	–	3	–	0	1	–	6	–	1
$ – Conference champion

1988 Presidents' Athletic Conference football standings
	Conf.					Overall
Team	W		L		T	W		L		T
Washington & Jefferson $	6	–	0	–	0	7	–	1	–	1
John Carroll	4	–	2	–	0	7	–	2	–	0
Hiram	4	–	2	–	0	6	–	3	–	0
Carnegie Mellon	2	–	3	–	1	5	–	4	–	1
Grove City	2	–	3	–	1	4	–	4	–	1
Bethany (WV)	2	–	4	–	0	4	–	5	–	0
Thiel	0	–	6	–	0	0	–	9	–	0
$ – Conference champion

1988 Southern California Intercollegiate Athletic Conference football standings
	Conf.					Overall
Team	W		L		T	W		L		T
Occidental $	5	–	0	–	0	7	–	2	–	0
Redlands	4	–	1	–	0	5	–	4	–	0
Whittier	2	–	2	–	1	3	–	6	–	0
La Verne	2	–	3	–	0	3	–	6	–	0
Claremont-Mudd	1	–	3	–	1	2	–	7	–	0
Pomona-Pitzer	0	–	5	–	0	0	–	8	–	0
$ – Conference champion; Each team played one other conference member twice. A head-to-head sweep of the two games counted as one win for the winner and one loss for the loser in the conference standings. A split of the two games counted as a tie for each team. Redlands received a non-conference forfeit win from Menlo.

1988 Wisconsin State University Conference football standings
	Conf.					Overall
Team	W		L		T	W		L		T
Wisconsin–Whitewater $^	7	–	1	–	0	9	–	3	–	0
No. 14 Wisconsin–La Crosse *	6	–	2	–	0	11	–	3	–	0
No. 15 Wisconsin–River Falls	6	–	2	–	0	7	–	3	–	0
No. 25 Wisconsin–Stevens Point	5	–	3	–	0	7	–	4	–	0
Wisconsin–Platteville	4	–	4	–	0	6	–	4	–	0
Wisconsin–Oshkosh	4	–	4	–	0	5	–	4	–	1
Wisconsin–Eau Claire	3	–	5	–	0	5	–	5	–	0
Wisconsin–Stout	1	–	7	–	0	2	–	8	–	0
Wisconsin–Superior	0	–	8	–	0	0	–	10	–	0
$ – Conference champion; ^ – NCAA Division III playoff participant; * – NAIA Division II playoff participant; Rankings from NAIA Division II poll

1988 NCAA Division III independents football records
	Conf.			Overall
Team	W	L	T	W		L		T
Cortland ^		–		11	–	1	–	0
Ferrum ^		–		11	–	1	–	0
Dayton ^		–		9	–	2	–	0
Hofstra ^		–		9	–	2	–	0
Rochester (NY)		–		8	–	2	–	0
Wagner ^		–		8	–	2	–	0
Aurora		–		7	–	2	–	0
Menlo		–		7	–	2	–	0
Wabash		–		7	–	2	–	0
Fairleigh Dickinson–Florham		–		6	–	2	–	0
Georgetown		–		6	–	2	–	0
Drake		–		7	–	3	–	0
Canisius		–		6	–	3	–	0
Mercyhurst		–		6	–	3	–	0
Salisbury State		–		6	–	3	–	0
Bentley		–		5	–	2	–	1
Millsaps		–		5	–	3	–	0
Catholic University		–		6	–	4	–	0
UC Santa Barbara		–		6	–	4	–	0
San Diego		–		5	–	4	–	0
Trinity (TX)		–		4	–	3	–	0
MIT		–		4	–	3	–	0
Albany		–		5	–	5	–	0
Quincy		–		5	–	5	–	0
Samford		–		5	–	6	–	0
Union (NY)		–		4	–	4	–	0
WPI		–		4	–	4	–	0
Colorado College		–		4	–	5	–	0
DePauw		–		4	–	5	–	0
Stonehill		–		3	–	4	–	1
Brockport		–		4	–	6	–	0
Frostburg State		–		4	–	6	–	0
Maryville (TN)		–		4	–	6	–	0
Norwich		–		4	–	6	–	0
Assumption		–		3	–	5	–	0
Marist		–		3	–	6	–	0
Chicago		–		3	–	6	–	0
Western Connecticut State		–		3	–	7	–	0
Duquesne		–		2	–	7	–	0
Buffalo		–		2	–	8	–	0
Washington (MO)		–		2	–	8	–	0
MacMurray		–		2	–	8	–	0
Buffalo State		–		1	–	7	–	0
Saint Francis (PA)		–		1	–	8	–	0
Wesley		–		1	–	8	–	0
Upsala		–		0	–	10	–	0
^ – NCAA Division III playoff participant

== Conference champions ==
Conference champions
- Centennial Conference – Dickinson and Franklin & Marshall
- College Athletic Conference – Rose–Hulman
- College Conference of Illinois and Wisconsin – Augustana (IL) and Carroll (WI)
- Iowa Intercollegiate Athletic Conference – Simpson
- Michigan Intercollegiate Athletic Association – Adrian and Alma
- Middle Atlantic Conference – Moravian and Widener
- Midwest Collegiate Athletic Conference – St. Norbert
- Minnesota Intercollegiate Athletic Conference – Concordia–Moorhead and Hamline
- New England Football Conference – Plymouth State
- New Jersey State Athletic Conference – Trenton State
- North Coast Athletic Conference – Allegheny
- Ohio Athletic Conference – Baldwin Wallace and Wittenberg
- Old Dominion Athletic Conference – Emory & Henry
- Presidents' Athletic Conference – Washington & Jefferson
- Southern California Intercollegiate Athletic Conference – Occidental
- Texas Intercollegiate Athletic Association – Austin
- Upper Midwest Athletic Conference – Concordia–Saint Paul
- Wisconsin Intercollegiate Athletic Conference – Wisconsin–Whitewater

== Postseason ==
The 1988 NCAA Division III Football Championship playoffs were the 16th annual single-elimination tournament to determine the national champion of men's NCAA Division III college football. The championship Stagg Bowl game was held at Garrett-Harrison Stadium in Phenix City, Alabama for the 14th time and for the fourth consecutive year. Like the previous three tournaments, this year's bracket featured sixteen teams.

=== Playoff bracket ===
First Round; Campus Sites
Cortland	32
Hofstra	17
Ithaca	34*
Wagner	31
Ferrum	34
Rhodes	10
Moravian	17
Widener	7
Wittenberg	35*
Dayton	28
Augustana (IL)	25
Adrian	7
Central (IA)	7
Concordia–Moorhead	0
Wisconsin–Whitewater	29
Simpson	27

Quarterfinals; Campus Sites
SUNY Cortland	17
Ithaca	24
Ferrum	49
Moravian	28
Wittenberg	14
Augustana (IL)	28
Central (IA)	16
Wisconsin–Whitewater	13

Semifinals; Campus Sites
Ithaca	62
Ferrum	28
Augustana (IL)	17
Central (IA)	23**

National Championship Game; Garrett-Harrison Stadium; Phenix City, Alabama
Ithaca	39
Central (IA)	24

== See also ==
- 1988 NCAA Division I-A football season
- 1988 NCAA Division I-AA football season
- 1988 NCAA Division II football season
