= Courage Bowl =

College football bowl game held in Rochester, New York

The Courage Bowl
- Courage Bowl
- Stadium: Eunice Kennedy Shriver Stadium; Growney Stadium
- Location: Rochester, NY
- Operated: 2005–present
- Conference tie-ins: Empire 8

Sponsors
- Camp Good Days and Special Times

2024 matchup
- Brockport vs. Fisher (TBD)

The Courage Bowl is an annual American college football bowl game that has been played every year starting in 2005.

The Courage Bowl features an annual match-up of Brockport and St. John Fisher. The game has been played at Eunice Kennedy Shriver Stadium, Growney Stadium, and Rochester Community Sports Complex Stadium, all located in or near Rochester, New York. Co-founded by the University of Rochester and St. John Fisher College in 2005, the Courage Bowl benefits Camp Good Days and Special Times, an organization that provides experiences for children diagnosed with cancer and other diseases. These children participate in the game as honorary coaches and cheerleaders. After 2012, the University of Rochester bowed out of the competition, and was replaced by Alfred University for the 2013 game. Brockport became a regular participant starting in 2014.

== Game results ==
| Date played | Home team | | Away team | | Attendance | Stats |
|---|---|---|---|---|---|---|
| September 30th, 2023 | St. John Fisher University | 18 | SUNY Brockport | 35 | 3,047 | Box Score |
| October 1st, 2022 | SUNY Brockport | 25 | St. John Fisher University | 0 | 6,029 | Box Score |
| October 2nd, 2021 | St. John Fisher College | 7 | The College at Brockport | 34 | 6,012 | Box Score |
| October 5th, 2019 | St. John Fisher College | 0 | The College at Brockport | 17 | 4,621 | Box Score |
| September 29th, 2018 | The College at Brockport | 49 | St. John Fisher College | 7 | 7,283 | Box Score |
| September 16th, 2017 | St. John Fisher College | 7 | The College at Brockport | 38 | 5,125 | Box Score |
| September 24th, 2016 | The College at Brockport | 38 | St. John Fisher College | 42 | 8,452 | |
| September 26th, 2015 | St. John Fisher College | 42 | The College at Brockport | 41 | 5,387 | |
| September 20th, 2014 | The College at Brockport | 20 | St. John Fisher College | 36 | 9,320 | |
| November 16th, 2013 | St. John Fisher College | 48 | Alfred University | 13 | 4,325 | |
| September 15th, 2012 | St. John Fisher College | 20 | University of Rochester | 16 | 5,177 | |
| September 17th, 2011 | St. John Fisher College | 52 | University of Rochester | 3 | 5,500 | |
| September 19th, 2010 | St. John Fisher College | 49 | University of Rochester | 21 | 5,586 | |
| September 19th, 2009 | St. John Fisher College | 35 | University of Rochester | 33 | 5,461 | |
| September 20th, 2008 | University of Rochester | 17 | St. John Fisher College | 24 | 4,124 | |
| September 15th, 2007 | St. John Fisher College | 37 | University of Rochester | 21 | 5,887 | |
| September 9th, 2006 | University of Rochester | 10 | St. John Fisher College | 30 | 4,167 | |
| September 10th, 2005 | St. John Fisher College | 58 | University of Rochester | 32 | 5,983 | |
