= 1989 Davidson Wildcats football team =

American college football season

1989 Davidson Wildcats football
- Conference: Independent
- Record: 2–8
- Head coach: Vic Gatto (5th season)
- Home stadium: Richardson Stadium

1989 NCAA Division III independents football records
	Conf.			Overall
Team	W	L	T	W		L		T
Dayton ^		–		13	–	0	–	1
Union (NY) ^		–		13	–	1	–	0
Frostburg State		–		9	–	1	–	0
Aurora		–		8	–	1	–	0
Ferrum ^		–		11	–	2	–	0
Cortland ^		–		9	–	2	–	0
Catholic University		–		8	–	2	–	0
UC Santa Barbara		–		8	–	2	–	0
San Diego		–		7	–	2	–	0
Quincy		–		7	–	2	–	1
Hofstra ^		–		8	–	3	–	0
Drake		–		7	–	3	–	0
Wagner		–		6	–	3	–	0
Duquesne		–		6	–	4	–	0
Albany		–		5	–	4	–	0
Canisius		–		5	–	4	–	0
Mercyhurst		–		5	–	4	–	0
Fairleigh Dickinson–Florham		–		4	–	4	–	1
Wesley		–		4	–	5	–	0
Buffalo		–		4	–	6	–	0
Maryville (TN)		–		4	–	6	–	0
Menlo		–		3	–	6	–	0
Brockport		–		3	–	7	–	0
Salisbury State		–		2	–	6	–	1
Norwich		–		2	–	7	–	1
Davidson		–		2	–	8	–	0
Georgetown		–		2	–	8	–	0
Western Connecticut State		–		2	–	8	–	0
Buffalo State		–		1	–	8	–	0
Colorado College		–		1	–	8	–	0
Gannon		–		0	–	7	–	0
Saint Peter's		–		0	–	7	–	0
Methodist		–		0	–	10	–	0
^ – NCAA Division III playoff participant

The 1989 Davidson Wildcats football team represented Davidson College as an independent during the 1989 NCAA Division III football season. Led by fifth-year head coach Vic Gatto, the Wildcats compiled an overall record of 2–8. This marked the first season Davidson competed at Division III after dropping down from the I-AA designation following their 1988 season.

== Schedule ==
Date	Opponent	Site	Result	Attendance	Source
September 9	Millsaps	Richardson Stadium; Davidson, NC	W 15–0		
September 16	at Dayton	Welcome Stadium; Dayton, OH	L 7–49	4,057	
September 24	at Wagner	Newark Schools Stadium; Newark, NJ (Pride Bowl)	L 11–35		
September 30	vs. Johnson C. Smith	American Legion Memorial Stadium; Charlotte, NC	L 15–18	2,011	
October 7	Fordham	Richardson Stadium; Davidson, NC	L 12–14	375	
October 14	at Methodist	Monarch Stadium; Fayetteville, NC	W 52–0	500	
October 21	Ferrum	Richardson Stadium; Davidson, NC	L 13–59	1,103	
October 28	at Wofford	Snyder Field; Spartanburg, SC	L 0–51	4,759	
November 4	at VMI	Alumni Memorial Field; Lexington, VA	L 36–39	3,865	
November 11	Salisbury State^{†}	Richardson Stadium; Davidson, NC	L 13–14	3,554	
^{†}Homecoming
