= Mike Willis (American football) =

American college football coach (born 1991)

Current position
- Title: Head coach
- Team: Marist
- Conference: Pioneer
- Record: 12–23

Biographical details
- Born: December 9, 1991 (age 34); Rutherford, New Jersey, U.S.

Playing career
- 2010–2013: Princeton
- Position: Offensive Lineman

Coaching career (HC unless noted)
- 2015: Princeton (Intern)
- 2016: Princeton (TE)
- 2017–2019: Princeton (AHC/TE)
- 2020–2023: Princeton (AHC/OC/TE)
- 2024–present: Marist

Head coaching record
- Overall: 12–23

Michael Willis (born December 9, 1991) is an American college football coach. He is the head football coach for Marist College; a position he has held since 2024.

Prior to Marist, Willis coached and played college football at Princeton University. His time at Princeton included four Ivy League Football championships (2013, 2016, 2018, 2021).

== Head coaching record ==
Year	Team	Overall	Conference	Standing	Bowl/playoffs
Marist Red Foxes (Pioneer Football League) (2024–present)
2024	Marist	1–10	1–7	10th	
2025	Marist	5–7	3–5	8th	
2026	Marist	6–6	4–3	4th	
Marist:		12–23	8–15		
Total:		12–23			
