= Jason Mangone =

American football coach

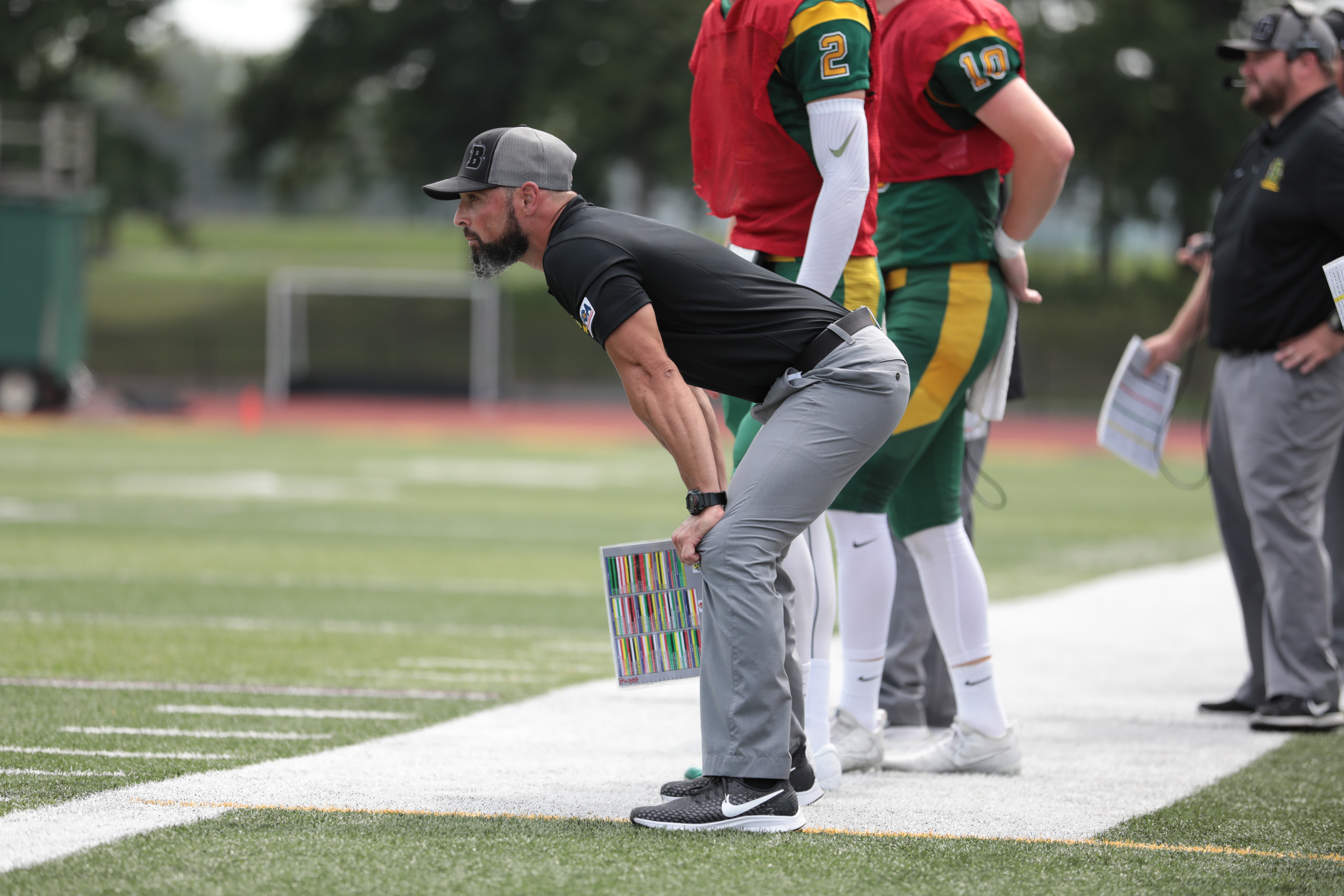

Current position
- Title: Head coach
- Team: Brockport
- Conference: Empire 8
- Record: 97–39

Playing career
- 1995–1996: Alfred
- 1997–1998: Brockport
- Position: Quarterback

Coaching career (HC unless noted)
- 1999–2003: Brockport (QB)
- 2004–2012: Brockport (OC)
- 2013–present: Brockport

Head coaching record
- Overall: 97–39
- Bowls: 4–2
- Tournaments: 5–3 (NCAA D-III playoffs)

Accomplishments and honors

Championships
- 1 NJAC (2013); 3 Empire 8 (2017–2019)

Awards
- AFCA NCAA Division III COY (2017)

Jason Mangone is an American college football coach. He is the head football coach for SUNY Brockport, a position he has held since 2013. Mangone played college football as a quarterback, first at Alfred University in Alfred, New York, before transferring to Brockport. He became an assistant coach at Brockport in 1999 and was promoted to offensive coordinator in 2004.

Mangone is a native of Lancaster, New York and now resides in Henrietta, New York.

== Head coaching record ==
Year	Team	Overall	Conference	Standing	Bowl/playoffs	D3^{#}
Brockport Golden Eagles (New Jersey Athletic Conference) (2013)
2013	Brockport	8–3	6–1	T–1st	W Northwest	
Brockport Golden Eagles (Empire 8) (2014–present)
2014	Brockport	5–5	3–5	T–6th		
2015	Brockport	5–5	3–5	T–6th		
2016	Brockport	7–4	6–2	T–2nd	L Presidents	13
2017	Brockport	13–1	7–0	1st	L NCAA Division III Semifinal	5
2018	Brockport	11–1	7–0	1st	L NCAA Division III Second Round	13
2019	Brockport	9–3	5–1	1st	L NCAA Division III Second Round	25
2020–21	No team—COVID-19					
2021	Brockport	8–3	4–2	T–2nd	W Clayton Chapman	
2022	Brockport	7–3	4–2	3rd	C Clayton Chapman	
2023	Brockport	8–3	5–1	2nd	L Asa S. Bushnell	
2024	Brockport	8–3	5–2	T–2nd	W Clayton Chapman	25
2025	Brockport	7–4	4–3	4th	W Robert M. "Scotty" Whitelaw	
2026	Brockport	1–1	0–0			
Brockport:		97–39	59–24			
Total:		97–39				
National championship Conference title Conference division title or championship game berth
