= 1989 NCAA Division III football season =

American college football season

- Regular season: August – November 1989
- Playoffs: November – December 1989
- National championship: Garrett-Harrison Stadium; Phenix City, AL
- Champion: Dayton

The 1989 NCAA Division III football season, part of the college football season organized by the NCAA at the Division III level in the United States, began in August 1989, and concluded with the NCAA Division III Football Championship, also known as the Stagg Bowl, in December 1989 at Garrett-Harrison Stadium in Phenix City, Alabama. The Dayton Flyers won their second Division III championship by defeating the Union (NY) Dutchmen, 17−7.

== Conference changes and new programs ==
- The Indiana Collegiate Athletic Conference, which was founded in 1987, began sponsoring football in 1989.

| School | 1988 Conference | 1989 Conference |
|---|---|---|
| Anderson | NAIA Independent | Indiana |
| Assumption | D-III Independent | ECFC |
| Bentley | D-III Independent | ECFC |
| DePauw | D-III Independent | ICAC |
| Earlham | CAC | NCAC |
| Fordham | Liberty (D-III) | I-AA Independent |
| Franklin (IN) | NAIA Independent | ICAC |
| Gannon | Program Revived | D-III Independent |
| Hanover | NAIA Independent | ICAC |
| John Carroll | PAC | OAC |
| MacMurray | D-III Independent | IBHFC (NAIA) |
| Manchester | NAIA Independent | Indiana |
| Marist | D-III Independent | ACFC |
| Maritime | ACFC | Dropped Program |
| Methodist | New Program | D-III Independent |
| Millsaps | D-III Independent | CAC |
| MIT | D-III Independent | ECFC |
| Rose-Hulman | CAC | ICAC |
| Saint Francis (PA) | D-III Independent | ACFC |
| Saint Peter's | Restarted Program | D-III Independent |
| Stonehill | D-III Independent | ECFC |
| Taylor | NAIA Independent | ICAC |
| Trinity (TX) | D-III Independent | CAC |
| Wabash | D-III Independent | ICAC |
| Western New England | NEFC | ECFC |
| Wittenberg | OAC | NCAC |

== Conference standings ==
1989 Atlantic Collegiate Football Conference standings
| | Conf. | | | | | Overall |
| Team | W | | L | | T | W | | L | | T |
|---|---|---|---|---|---|---|---|---|---|---|
| Gallaudet + | 4 | – | 1 | – | 0 | 7 | – | 3 | – | 0 |
| St. John Fisher + | 4 | – | 1 | – | 0 | 6 | – | 4 | – | 0 |
| Marist | 3 | – | 2 | – | 0 | 4 | – | 5 | – | 1 |
| Saint Francis (PA) | 2 | – | 3 | – | 0 | 2 | – | 8 | – | 0 |
| Siena | 2 | – | 3 | – | 0 | 2 | – | 8 | – | 0 |
| Brooklyn | 0 | – | 5 | – | 0 | 1 | – | 5 | – | 0 |
+ – Conference co-champions

1989 Centennial Conference football standings
| | Conf. | | | | | Overall |
| Team | W | | L | | T | W | | L | | T |
|---|---|---|---|---|---|---|---|---|---|---|
| Dickinson $^ | 7 | – | 0 | – | 0 | 9 | – | 1 | – | 1 |
| Franklin & Marshall | 6 | – | 1 | – | 0 | 10 | – | 1 | – | 0 |
| Muhlenberg | 4 | – | 2 | – | 1 | 5 | – | 4 | – | 1 |
| Ursinus | 3 | – | 4 | – | 0 | 5 | – | 5 | – | 0 |
| Swarthmore | 3 | – | 4 | – | 0 | 5 | – | 5 | – | 0 |
| Gettysburg | 2 | – | 4 | – | 1 | 2 | – | 7 | – | 1 |
| Western Maryland | 1 | – | 6 | – | 0 | 2 | – | 8 | – | 0 |
| Johns Hopkins | 1 | – | 6 | – | 0 | 1 | – | 9 | – | 0 |
$ – Conference champion; ^ – NCAA Division III playoff participant

1989 College Athletic Conference football standings
| | Conf. | | | | | Overall |
| Team | W | | L | | T | W | | L | | T |
|---|---|---|---|---|---|---|---|---|---|---|
| Centre $ | 4 | – | 0 | – | 0 | 8 | – | 1 | – | 0 |
| Rhodes | 3 | – | 1 | – | 0 | 7 | – | 1 | – | 0 |
| Millsaps | 2 | – | 2 | – | 0 | 5 | – | 4 | – | 0 |
| Sewanee | 1 | – | 3 | – | 0 | 4 | – | 4 | – | 1 |
| Trinity (TX) | 0 | – | 4 | – | 0 | 1 | – | 8 | – | 0 |
$ – Conference champion

1989 College Conference of Illinois and Wisconsin football standings
| | Conf. | | | | | Overall |
| Team | W | | L | | T | W | | L | | T |
|---|---|---|---|---|---|---|---|---|---|---|
| Millikin $^ | 8 | – | 0 | – | 0 | 10 | – | 1 | – | 0 |
| Augustana (IL) ^ | 7 | – | 1 | – | 0 | 8 | – | 2 | – | 0 |
| Carroll (WI) | 6 | – | 2 | – | 0 | 6 | – | 3 | – | 0 |
| Wheaton (IL) | 5 | – | 3 | – | 0 | 6 | – | 3 | – | 0 |
| Illinois Wesleyan | 4 | – | 4 | – | 0 | 5 | – | 4 | – | 0 |
| North Central (IL) | 3 | – | 5 | – | 0 | 3 | – | 6 | – | 0 |
| Carthage | 1 | – | 7 | – | 0 | 1 | – | 8 | – | 0 |
| Elmhurst | 1 | – | 7 | – | 0 | 1 | – | 8 | – | 0 |
| North Park | 1 | – | 7 | – | 0 | 1 | – | 8 | – | 0 |
$ – Conference champion; ^ – NCAA Division III playoff participant

1989 Eastern Collegiate Football Conference standings
| | Conf. | | | | | Overall |
| Team | W | | L | | T | W | | L | | T |
|---|---|---|---|---|---|---|---|---|---|---|
| Stonehill $ | 5 | – | 1 | – | 0 | 6 | – | 3 | – | 0 |
| MIT | 3 | – | 2 | – | 0 | 4 | – | 3 | – | 1 |
| Western New England | 3 | – | 3 | – | 0 | 5 | – | 3 | – | 0 |
| Bentley | 2 | – | 2 | – | 0 | 5 | – | 4 | – | 0 |
| Assumption | 0 | – | 5 | – | 0 | 0 | – | 7 | – | 1 |
$ – Conference champion

1989 Independent College Athletic Conference football standings
| | Conf. | | | | | Overall |
| Team | W | | L | | T | W | | L | | T |
|---|---|---|---|---|---|---|---|---|---|---|
| Alfred $ | 3 | – | 0 | – | 0 | 9 | – | 2 | – | 0 |
| Ithaca | 2 | – | 1 | – | 0 | 7 | – | 3 | – | 0 |
| St. Lawrence | 2 | – | 2 | – | 0 | 5 | – | 5 | – | 0 |
| RPI | 1 | – | 1 | – | 0 | 3 | – | 6 | – | 0 |
| Hobart | 0 | – | 4 | – | 0 | 2 | – | 8 | – | 0 |
$ – Conference champion

1989 Indiana Collegiate Athletic Conference football standings
| | Conf. | | | | | Overall |
| Team | W | | L | | T | W | | L | | T |
|---|---|---|---|---|---|---|---|---|---|---|
| Hanover $^ | 7 | – | 0 | – | 0 | 9 | – | 1 | – | 1 |
| Taylor | 5 | – | 1 | – | 1 | 7 | – | 2 | – | 1 |
| DePauw | 4 | – | 1 | – | 2 | 6 | – | 2 | – | 2 |
| Franklin (IN) | 5 | – | 2 | – | 0 | 6 | – | 4 | – | 0 |
| Wabash | 3 | – | 4 | – | 0 | 5 | – | 4 | – | 0 |
| Rose–Hulman | 3 | – | 4 | – | 0 | 5 | – | 4 | – | 1 |
| Anderson (IN) | 1 | – | 6 | – | 0 | 2 | – | 8 | – | 0 |
| Manchester | 0 | – | 7 | – | 0 | 0 | – | 10 | – | 0 |
$ – Conference champion; ^ – NAIA Division II playoff participant None of the conference members played a full round-robin; each had one or more games against non-conference opponents designated as "wild card" games that counted in the conference standings.

1989 Iowa Conference football standings
| | Conf. | | | | | Overall |
| Team | W | | L | | T | W | | L | | T |
|---|---|---|---|---|---|---|---|---|---|---|
| Central (IA) $^ | 8 | – | 0 | – | 0 | 10 | – | 1 | – | 0 |
| Simpson (IA) ^ | 7 | – | 1 | – | 0 | 8 | – | 2 | – | 0 |
| Loras | 5 | – | 3 | – | 0 | 6 | – | 4 | – | 0 |
| Wartburg | 5 | – | 3 | – | 0 | 5 | – | 5 | – | 0 |
| Luther | 4 | – | 4 | – | 0 | 4 | – | 4 | – | 0 |
| Buena Vista | 3 | – | 5 | – | 0 | 5 | – | 5 | – | 0 |
| Dubuque | 3 | – | 5 | – | 0 | 4 | – | 6 | – | 0 |
| William Penn | 1 | – | 7 | – | 0 | 1 | – | 9 | – | 0 |
| Upper Iowa | 0 | – | 8 | – | 0 | 0 | – | 10 | – | 0 |
$ – Conference champion; ^ – NCAA Division III playoff participant

1989 Liberty Football Conference standings
| | Conf. | | | | | Overall |
| Team | W | | L | | T | W | | L | | T |
|---|---|---|---|---|---|---|---|---|---|---|
| St. John's $ | 5 | – | 0 | – | 0 | 9 | – | 1 | – | 0 |
| Iona | 4 | – | 1 | – | 0 | 8 | – | 2 | – | 0 |
| Merchant Marine | 2 | – | 3 | – | 0 | 5 | – | 4 | – | 0 |
| C. W. Post | 2 | – | 3 | – | 0 | 5 | – | 5 | – | 0 |
| Stony Brook | 1 | – | 4 | – | 0 | 3 | – | 7 | – | 0 |
| Pace | 1 | – | 4 | – | 0 | 1 | – | 9 | – | 0 |
$ – Conference champion

1989 Michigan Intercollegiate Athletic Association football standings
| | Conf. | | | | | Overall |
| Team | W | | L | | T | W | | L | | T |
|---|---|---|---|---|---|---|---|---|---|---|
| Albion + | 4 | – | 1 | – | 0 | 7 | – | 2 | – | 0 |
| Adrian + | 4 | – | 1 | – | 0 | 5 | – | 4 | – | 0 |
| Hope | 3 | – | 2 | – | 0 | 4 | – | 5 | – | 1 |
| Alma | 2 | – | 3 | – | 0 | 5 | – | 4 | – | 0 |
| Olivet | 1 | – | 4 | – | 0 | 4 | – | 5 | – | 0 |
| Kalamazoo | 1 | – | 4 | – | 0 | 1 | – | 7 | – | 1 |
+ – Conference co-champions

1989 Middle Atlantic Conference football standings
| | Conf. | | | | | Overall |
| Team | W | | L | | T | W | | L | | T |
|---|---|---|---|---|---|---|---|---|---|---|
| Lycoming +^ | 7 | – | 1 | – | 0 | 10 | – | 2 | – | 0 |
| Susquehanna + | 7 | – | 1 | – | 0 | 8 | – | 1 | – | 1 |
| Moravian | 6 | – | 2 | – | 0 | 8 | – | 2 | – | 0 |
| Widener | 6 | – | 2 | – | 0 | 8 | – | 2 | – | 0 |
| Lebanon Valley | 4 | – | 4 | – | 0 | 6 | – | 4 | – | 0 |
| Delaware Valley | 3 | – | 5 | – | 0 | 3 | – | 7 | – | 0 |
| Albright | 2 | – | 6 | – | 0 | 2 | – | 8 | – | 0 |
| Juniata | 1 | – | 7 | – | 0 | 2 | – | 8 | – | 0 |
| Wilkes | 0 | – | 8 | – | 0 | 1 | – | 9 | – | 0 |
+ – Conference co-champions; ^ – NCAA Division III playoff participant

1989 Midwest Conference football standings
| | Conf. | | | | | Overall |
| Team | W | | L | | T | W | | L | | T |
|---|---|---|---|---|---|---|---|---|---|---|
North Division
| St. Norbert xy$^ | 6 | – | 0 | – | 0 | 8 | – | 3 | – | 0 |
| Beloit | 3 | – | 3 | – | 0 | 6 | – | 3 | – | 0 |
| Lake Forest | 2 | – | 4 | – | 0 | 3 | – | 6 | – | 0 |
| Ripon | 1 | – | 5 | – | 0 | 2 | – | 6 | – | 1 |
| Lawrence | 1 | – | 5 | – | 0 | 1 | – | 8 | – | 0 |
South Division
| Monmouth (IL) xy | 6 | – | 1 | – | 0 | 8 | – | 2 | – | 0 |
| Coe | 5 | – | 2 | – | 0 | 6 | – | 3 | – | 0 |
| Illinois College | 4 | – | 3 | – | 0 | 6 | – | 3 | – | 0 |
| Cornell (IA) | 3 | – | 3 | – | 0 | 4 | – | 5 | – | 0 |
| Knox | 3 | – | 4 | – | 0 | 3 | – | 6 | – | 0 |
| Grinnell | 1 | – | 5 | – | 0 | 3 | – | 6 | – | 0 |
Championship: St. Norbert 17, Monmouth (IL) 6
$ – Conference champion; x – Division champion/co-champions; y – Championship game participant; ^ – NCAA Division III playoff participant

1989 Minnesota Intercollegiate Athletic Conference football standings
| | Conf. | | | | | Overall |
| Team | W | | L | | T | W | | L | | T |
|---|---|---|---|---|---|---|---|---|---|---|
| Saint John's (MN) $^ | 8 | – | 0 | – | 1 | 10 | – | 1 | – | 1 |
| Concordia–Moorhead | 6 | – | 2 | – | 1 | 7 | – | 2 | – | 1 |
| Carleton | 6 | – | 3 | – | 0 | 7 | – | 3 | – | 0 |
| Hamline | 5 | – | 4 | – | 0 | 6 | – | 4 | – | 0 |
| St. Olaf | 5 | – | 4 | – | 0 | 6 | – | 4 | – | 0 |
| Gustavus Adolphus | 5 | – | 4 | – | 0 | 5 | – | 5 | – | 0 |
| St. Thomas (MN) | 4 | – | 4 | – | 1 | 4 | – | 5 | – | 1 |
| Bethel (MN) | 2 | – | 6 | – | 1 | 3 | – | 6 | – | 1 |
| Augsburg | 2 | – | 7 | – | 0 | 2 | – | 8 | – | 0 |
| Macalester | 0 | – | 9 | – | 0 | 1 | – | 9 | – | 0 |
$ – Conference champion; ^ – NCAA Division III playoff participant

1989 New England Football Conference standings
| | Conf. | | | | | Overall |
| Team | W | | L | | T | W | | L | | T |
|---|---|---|---|---|---|---|---|---|---|---|
North Division
| Lowell xy | 5 | – | 0 | – | 0 | 9 | – | 1 | – | 0 |
| Plymouth State | 4 | – | 1 | – | 0 | 8 | – | 2 | – | 0 |
| Curry | 3 | – | 2 | – | 0 | 6 | – | 2 | – | 0 |
| Nichols | 2 | – | 3 | – | 0 | 4 | – | 5 | – | 0 |
| Maine Maritime | 1 | – | 4 | – | 0 | 5 | – | 4 | – | 0 |
| UMass–Boston | 0 | – | 5 | – | 0 | 1 | – | 7 | – | 1 |
South Division
| Bridgewater State xy$ | 6 | – | 0 | – | 0 | 9 | – | 1 | – | 0 |
| Framingham State | 3 | – | 3 | – | 0 | 4 | – | 5 | – | 0 |
| Worcester State | 3 | – | 3 | – | 0 | 4 | – | 5 | – | 0 |
| Westfield State | 3 | – | 3 | – | 0 | 3 | – | 7 | – | 0 |
| Fitchburg State | 2 | – | 4 | – | 0 | 3 | – | 7 | – | 0 |
| Massachusetts Maritime | 2 | – | 4 | – | 0 | 2 | – | 7 | – | 0 |
| Southeastern Massachusetts | 2 | – | 4 | – | 0 | 2 | – | 7 | – | 0 |
Championship: Bridgewater State 14, Lowell 10
$ – Conference champion; x – Division champion/co-champions; y – Championship game participant

1989 New England Small College Athletic Conference football standings
| | Conf. | | | | | Overall |
| Team | W | | L | | T | W | | L | | T |
|---|---|---|---|---|---|---|---|---|---|---|
| Williams | 8 | – | 0 | – | 0 | 8 | – | 0 | – | 0 |
| Trinity (CT) | 6 | – | 1 | – | 0 | 6 | – | 2 | – | 0 |
| Tufts | 6 | – | 2 | – | 0 | 6 | – | 2 | – | 0 |
| Hamilton | 4 | – | 3 | – | 0 | 4 | – | 4 | – | 0 |
| Amherst | 4 | – | 3 | – | 0 | 4 | – | 4 | – | 0 |
| Colby | 4 | – | 4 | – | 0 | 4 | – | 4 | – | 0 |
| Middlebury | 1 | – | 5 | – | 1 | 2 | – | 5 | – | 1 |
| Bowdoin | 1 | – | 5 | – | 1 | 1 | – | 6 | – | 1 |
| Wesleyan | 1 | – | 6 | – | 0 | 1 | – | 7 | – | 0 |
| Bates | 1 | – | 7 | – | 0 | 1 | – | 7 | – | 0 |
The NESCAC did not recognize an official conference champion until 2000

1989 New Jersey Athletic Conference football standings
| | Conf. | | | | | Overall |
| Team | W | | L | | T | W | | L | | T |
|---|---|---|---|---|---|---|---|---|---|---|
| Montclair State $^ | 5 | – | 0 | – | 1 | 9 | – | 2 | – | 1 |
| Trenton State | 4 | – | 1 | – | 1 | 8 | – | 1 | – | 1 |
| Ramapo | 4 | – | 2 | – | 0 | 7 | – | 2 | – | 0 |
| Glassboro State | 4 | – | 2 | – | 0 | 5 | – | 3 | – | 2 |
| Kean | 2 | – | 4 | – | 0 | 3 | – | 7 | – | 0 |
| Jersey City State | 1 | – | 5 | – | 0 | 4 | – | 6 | – | 0 |
| William Paterson | 0 | – | 6 | – | 0 | 2 | – | 7 | – | 0 |
$ – Conference champion; ^ – NCAA Division III playoff participant

1989 North Coast Athletic Conference football standings
| | Conf. | | | | | Overall |
| Team | W | | L | | T | W | | L | | T |
|---|---|---|---|---|---|---|---|---|---|---|
| Ohio Wesleyan + | 5 | – | 1 | – | 0 | 8 | – | 1 | – | 1 |
| Kenyon + | 5 | – | 1 | – | 0 | 5 | – | 4 | – | 1 |
| Allegheny | 5 | – | 2 | – | 0 | 6 | – | 4 | – | 0 |
| Wittenberg | 4 | – | 3 | – | 0 | 4 | – | 5 | – | 0 |
| Wooster | 3 | – | 3 | – | 0 | 4 | – | 6 | – | 0 |
| Denison | 3 | – | 4 | – | 0 | 5 | – | 5 | – | 0 |
| Case Western Reserve | 3 | – | 4 | – | 0 | 4 | – | 6 | – | 0 |
| Oberlin | 1 | – | 5 | – | 0 | 4 | – | 6 | – | 0 |
| Earlham | 0 | – | 6 | – | 0 | 1 | – | 9 | – | 0 |
+ – Conference co-champions

1989 Ohio Athletic Conference football standings
| | Conf. | | | | | Overall |
| Team | W | | L | | T | W | | L | | T |
|---|---|---|---|---|---|---|---|---|---|---|
| John Carroll $^ | 7 | – | 1 | – | 0 | 9 | – | 2 | – | 0 |
| Mount Union | 6 | – | 1 | – | 1 | 7 | – | 2 | – | 1 |
| Muskingum | 6 | – | 2 | – | 0 | 7 | – | 3 | – | 0 |
| Baldwin–Wallace | 5 | – | 2 | – | 1 | 5 | – | 4 | – | 1 |
| Heidelberg | 5 | – | 3 | – | 0 | 7 | – | 3 | – | 0 |
| Otterbein | 3 | – | 5 | – | 0 | 4 | – | 6 | – | 0 |
| Ohio Northern | 2 | – | 6 | – | 0 | 3 | – | 7 | – | 0 |
| Marietta | 1 | – | 7 | – | 0 | 3 | – | 7 | – | 0 |
| Capital | 0 | – | 8 | – | 0 | 1 | – | 9 | – | 0 |
$ – Conference champion; ^ – NCAA Division III playoff participant; * – did not compete for championship

1989 Old Dominion Athletic Conference football standings
| | Conf. | | | | | Overall |
| Team | W | | L | | T | W | | L | | T |
|---|---|---|---|---|---|---|---|---|---|---|
| Randolph–Macon $ | 3 | – | 1 | – | 0 | 5 | – | 5 | – | 0 |
| Emory & Henry | 3 | – | 1 | – | 0 | 6 | – | 4 | – | 0 |
| Hampden–Sydney | 2 | – | 2 | – | 0 | 6 | – | 4 | – | 0 |
| Washington and Lee | 1 | – | 3 | – | 0 | 5 | – | 5 | – | 0 |
| Bridgewater | 1 | – | 3 | – | 0 | 4 | – | 6 | – | 0 |
$ – Conference champion; Randolph–Macon won the conference title by virtue of a head-to-head win over Emory & Henry.

1989 Presidents' Athletic Conference football standings
| | Conf. | | | | | Overall |
| Team | W | | L | | T | W | | L | | T |
|---|---|---|---|---|---|---|---|---|---|---|
| Washington & Jefferson +^ | 4 | – | 1 | – | 0 | 8 | – | 2 | – | 0 |
| Carnegie Mellon + | 4 | – | 1 | – | 0 | 7 | – | 3 | – | 0 |
| Thiel | 3 | – | 2 | – | 0 | 3 | – | 6 | – | 0 |
| Hiram | 2 | – | 2 | – | 1 | 3 | – | 5 | – | 1 |
| Grove City | 1 | – | 3 | – | 1 | 2 | – | 6 | – | 1 |
| Bethany (WV) | 0 | – | 5 | – | 0 | 0 | – | 9 | – | 0 |
$ – Conference champion; ^ – NCAA Division III playoff participant

1989 Southern California Intercollegiate Athletic Conference football standings
| | Conf. | | | | | Overall |
| Team | W | | L | | T | W | | L | | T |
|---|---|---|---|---|---|---|---|---|---|---|
| Occidental $ | 4 | – | 0 | – | 1 | 7 | – | 2 | – | 0 |
| La Verne | 3 | – | 1 | – | 1 | 4 | – | 5 | – | 0 |
| Redlands | 3 | – | 1 | – | 1 | 4 | – | 5 | – | 0 |
| Whittier | 2 | – | 2 | – | 1 | 3 | – | 6 | – | 0 |
| Claremont-Mudd | 1 | – | 4 | – | 0 | 3 | – | 6 | – | 0 |
| Pomona-Pitzer | 0 | – | 5 | – | 0 | 1 | – | 7 | – | 0 |
$ – Conference champion; Each team played one other conference member twice. A head-to-head sweep of the two games counted as one win for the winner and one loss for the loser in the conference standings. A split of the two games counted as a tie for each team.

1989 Wisconsin State University Conference football standings
| | Conf. | | | | | Overall |
| Team | W | | L | | T | W | | L | | T |
|---|---|---|---|---|---|---|---|---|---|---|
| No. 4 Wisconsin–La Crosse $^ | 7 | – | 1 | – | 0 | 12 | – | 2 | – | 0 |
| No. 9 Wisconsin–Stevens Point ^ | 6 | – | 1 | – | 1 | 8 | – | 2 | – | 1 |
| No. 22 Wisconsin–River Falls | 6 | – | 2 | – | 0 | 7 | – | 3 | – | 0 |
| Wisconsin–Platteville | 5 | – | 2 | – | 1 | 6 | – | 2 | – | 1 |
| No. 24 Wisconsin–Eau Claire | 5 | – | 3 | – | 0 | 7 | – | 3 | – | 0 |
| Wisconsin–Whitewater | 2 | – | 5 | – | 1 | 4 | – | 5 | – | 1 |
| Wisconsin–Stout | 2 | – | 6 | – | 0 | 3 | – | 7 | – | 0 |
| Wisconsin–Oshkosh | 1 | – | 6 | – | 1 | 3 | – | 6 | – | 1 |
| Wisconsin–Superior | 0 | – | 8 | – | 0 | 1 | – | 9 | – | 0 |
$ – Conference champion; ^ – NAIA Division II playoff participant; Rankings from NAIA Division II poll

1989 NCAA Division III independents football records
| | Conf. | | | Overall |
| Team | W | L | T | W | | L | | T |
|---|---|---|---|---|---|---|---|---|
| Dayton ^ | | – | | 13 | – | 0 | – | 1 |
| Union (NY) ^ | | – | | 13 | – | 1 | – | 0 |
| Frostburg State | | – | | 9 | – | 1 | – | 0 |
| Aurora | | – | | 8 | – | 1 | – | 0 |
| Ferrum ^ | | – | | 11 | – | 2 | – | 0 |
| Cortland ^ | | – | | 9 | – | 2 | – | 0 |
| Catholic University | | – | | 8 | – | 2 | – | 0 |
| UC Santa Barbara | | – | | 8 | – | 2 | – | 0 |
| Rochester (NY) | | – | | 8 | – | 2 | – | 0 |
| WPI | | – | | 8 | – | 2 | – | 0 |
| San Diego | | – | | 7 | – | 2 | – | 0 |
| Quincy | | – | | 7 | – | 2 | – | 1 |
| Hofstra ^ | | – | | 8 | – | 3 | – | 0 |
| Drake | | – | | 7 | – | 3 | – | 0 |
| Wagner | | – | | 6 | – | 3 | – | 0 |
| Duquesne | | – | | 6 | – | 4 | – | 0 |
| Albany | | – | | 5 | – | 4 | – | 0 |
| Canisius | | – | | 5 | – | 4 | – | 0 |
| Mercyhurst | | – | | 5 | – | 4 | – | 0 |
| Coast Guard | | – | | 5 | – | 4 | – | 0 |
| Fairleigh Dickinson–Florham | | – | | 4 | – | 4 | – | 1 |
| Wesley | | – | | 4 | – | 5 | – | 0 |
| Washington (MO) | | – | | 4 | – | 5 | – | 0 |
| Buffalo | | – | | 4 | – | 6 | – | 0 |
| Maryville (TN) | | – | | 4 | – | 6 | – | 0 |
| Menlo | | – | | 3 | – | 6 | – | 0 |
| Brockport | | – | | 3 | – | 7 | – | 0 |
| Salisbury State | | – | | 2 | – | 6 | – | 1 |
| Chicago | | – | | 2 | – | 7 | – | 0 |
| Norwich | | – | | 2 | – | 7 | – | 1 |
| Davidson | | – | | 2 | – | 8 | – | 0 |
| Georgetown | | – | | 2 | – | 8 | – | 0 |
| Western Connecticut State | | – | | 2 | – | 8 | – | 0 |
| Buffalo State | | – | | 1 | – | 8 | – | 0 |
| Colorado College | | – | | 1 | – | 8 | – | 0 |
| Gannon | | – | | 0 | – | 7 | – | 0 |
| Saint Peter's | | – | | 0 | – | 7 | – | 0 |
| Methodist | | – | | 0 | – | 10 | – | 0 |
| Upsala | | – | | 0 | – | 10 | – | 0 |
^ – NCAA Division III playoff participant

== Conference champions ==
Conference champions
- Centennial Conference – Dickinson
- College Athletic Conference – Centre
- College Conference of Illinois and Wisconsin – Millikin
- Indiana Collegiate Athletic Conference – Hanover
- Iowa Intercollegiate Athletic Conference – Central (IA)
- Michigan Intercollegiate Athletic Association – Adrian and Albion
- Middle Atlantic Conference – Lycoming and Susquehanna
- Midwest Collegiate Athletic Conference – St. Norbert
- Minnesota Intercollegiate Athletic Conference – Saint John's (MN)
- New England Football Conference – Bridgewater State
- New Jersey State Athletic Conference – Montclair State
- North Coast Athletic Conference – Kenyon and Ohio Wesleyan
- Ohio Athletic Conference – John Carroll
- Old Dominion Athletic Conference – Randolph-Macon
- Presidents' Athletic Conference – Carnegie Mellon and Washington & Jefferson
- Southern California Intercollegiate Athletic Conference – Occidental
- Texas Intercollegiate Athletic Association – Howard Payne and Tarleton State
- Upper Midwest Athletic Conference – Mount Senario
- Wisconsin Intercollegiate Athletic Conference – Wisconsin–La Crosse

== Postseason ==
The 1989 NCAA Division III Football Championship playoffs were the 17th annual single-elimination tournament to determine the national champion of men's NCAA Division III college football. The championship Stagg Bowl game was held at Garrett-Harrison Stadium in Phenix City, Alabama for the 15th, and final, time and for the fifth consecutive year. Like the previous four tournaments, this year's bracket featured sixteen teams.

=== Playoff bracket ===
First Round; Campus Sites
Union (NY) | 42
Cortland | 14
Montclair State | 23
Hofstra | 6
Lycoming | 21
Dickinson | 0
Ferrum | 41
Washington & Jefferson | 7
Dayton | 35
John Carroll | 10
Millikin | 21
Augustana (IL) | 12
Central (IA) | 55
St. Norbert | 7
Saint John's (MN) | 42
Simpson | 35

Quarterfinals; Campus Sites
Union (NY) | 45
Montclair State | 6
Lycoming | 24
Ferrum | 49
Dayton | 28
Millikin | 16
Central (IA) | 24
Saint John's (MN) | 27

Semifinals; Campus Sites
Union (NY) | 37
Ferrum | 21
Dayton | 28
Saint John's (MN) | 0

National Championship Game; Garrett-Harrison Stadium; Phenix City, Alabama
Union (NY) | 7
Dayton | 17

== See also ==
- 1989 NCAA Division I-A football season
- 1989 NCAA Division I-AA football season
- 1989 NCAA Division II football season
- 1989 NAIA Division I football season
- 1989 NAIA Division II football season
