= John Carroll Blue Streaks football =

Football team for John Carroll University

- First season: 1920; 106 years ago
- Head coach: Brian Polian; 1st season, 0–0 (–)
- Location: University Heights, Ohio
- Stadium: Don Shula Stadium
- NCAA division: Division III
- Conference: NCAC
- Colors: Blue and gold

Conference championships
- PAC: 1957, 1959, 1962, 1963, 1969, 1971, 1974 OAC: 1938, 1989, 1994, 2016; NCAC: 2025
- Website: JCUSports.com

The John Carroll Blue Streaks football program is the intercollegiate American football team for John Carroll University located in the U.S. state of Ohio. They compete in the National Collegiate Athletic Association (NCAA) at the Division III level and are members of the North Coast Athletic Conference (NCAC). The team was established in 1920 and plays its home games at the 5,416 seat Don Shula Stadium. As of the 2016 season, John Carroll has won 11 conference titles, 7 in the Presidents' Athletic Conference and 4 in the Ohio Athletic Conference. Drew Nystrom serves as the interim head football coach. During the 2022 season, John Carroll celebrated its 100th season of football.

== Postseason appearances ==
=== NCAA Division III playoffs ===
The Blue Streaks have made nine appearances in the NCAA Division III playoffs, with a combined record of 13–9.

Year	Round	Opponent	Result
1989	First Round	Dayton	L, 10–35
1997	First Round; Second Round	Hanover; Mount Union	W, 30–20; L, 7–59
2002	First Round; Second Round; Quarterfinals; Semifinals	Hobart; Muhlenberg; Brockport; Mount Union	W, 27–7; W, 21–10; W, 16–10 ^{OT} L, 19–57
2013	First Round	St. John Fisher	L, 16–25
2014	First Round; Second Round; Quarterfinals	Centre (KY); Wheaton (IL); Mount Union	W, 63–28; W, 14–12; L, 28–36
2016	First Round; Second Round; Quarterfinals; Semifinals	Olivet; Wesley; Wisconsin–Whitewater; Wisconsin–Oshkosh	W, 37–12; W, 20–17 ^{2OT} W, 31–14; L, 3–10
2018	First Round	Randolph–Macon	L, 20–23
2024	First Round; Second Round	Mount St. Joseph; Mount Union	W, 52–7; L, 7–42
2025	Second Round; Third Round; Quarterfinals; Semifinals	Randolph–Macon; Mount Union; Berry; North Central (IL)	W, 35–6; W, 10–7 ^{2OT} W, 21–13; L, 21–41

== Rivals ==
John Carroll has two predominant rivals.

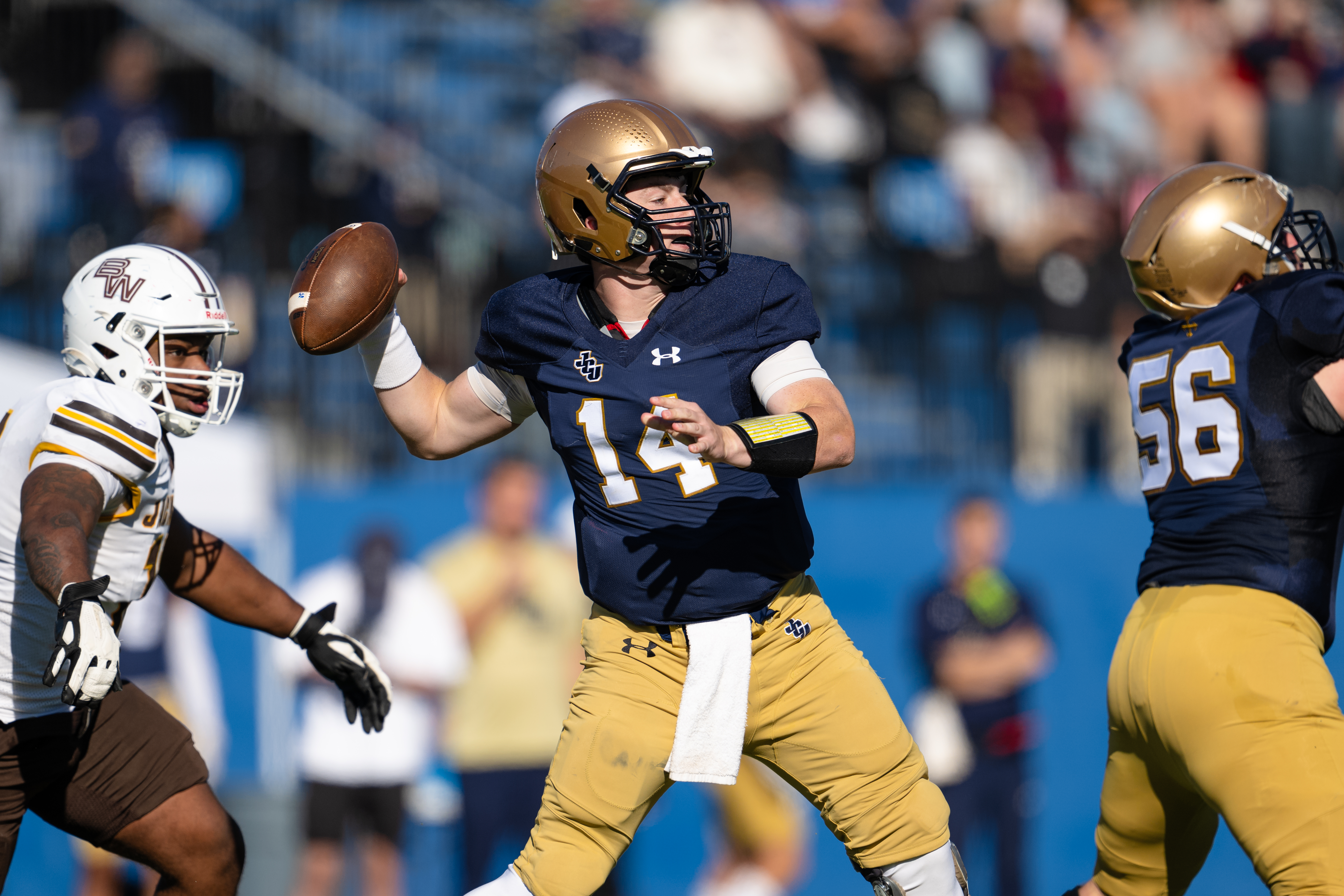
A game between John Carroll and Baldwin Wallace in 2024

- Baldwin Wallace Yellow Jackets – The rivalry dates back to 1923, with John Carroll leading the all-time series 30–25–4. The series drew huge crowds during the 1930s and 1940s during Cleveland's Big Four college football era, when games were played at Cleveland Municipal Stadium and League Park. Since 1989, a rivalry has been dubbed the Cuyahoga Gold Bowl. John Carroll has won nine straight over Baldwin Wallace, including a 29–28 win on November 13, 2021 that featured an 18-point fourth quarter comeback.
- Mount Union Purple Raiders – On November 12, 2016, the Blue Streaks ended Mount Union's 112 regular season game win streak. Mount Union holds a 34–3–2 all-time series lead. John Carroll most recently beat Mount Union in a double overtime victory in the Third Round of the NCAA Division III Playoffs on December 6, 2025.

== Notable alumni ==
John Carroll has been noted as a "springboard" to NFL personnel positions.

- Graham Armstrong – professional football player, Cleveland Rams and Buffalo Bills
- Tom Arth – professional football player, Indianapolis Colts and Green Bay Packers, former head coach for University of Akron
- David Caldwell – former general manager, Jacksonville Jaguars
- Nick Caserio – general manager, Houston Texans
- Enrique Ecker – professional football player, Chicago Bears, Green Bay Packers, and Washington Redskins
- London Fletcher – professional football player, St. Louis Rams, Buffalo Bills, and Washington Redskins
- Josh McDaniels – offensive coordinator of the New England Patriots, former head coach of the Las Vegas Raiders, former head coach of the Denver Broncos
- Brian Polian – college football coach, current athletic director for John Carroll University
- Chris Polian – American football scout and executive, NFL
- Chuck Priefer – former assistant coach, NFL
- Greg Roman – offensive coordinator of the Los Angeles Chargers, former for the Buffalo Bills, San Francisco 49ers, and Baltimore Ravens
- Don Shula – professional football player and Hall of Fame coach, Baltimore Colts and Miami Dolphins
- Carl Taseff – professional football player and coach, Baltimore Colts, Buffalo Bills, and Miami Dolphins
- Tom Telesco – former general manager, Las Vegas Raiders
- Jerry Schuplinski – assistant coach, Houston Texans
- Ken O'Keefe – former quarterbacks coach, University of Iowa
- Nick Caley – offensive coordinator, Houston Texans
- Frank Ross – assistant coach, Houston Texans
- Dave Ziegler – assistant general manager, NFL
- Nick Ciulli - Head Football Coach, North Royalton High School, 21 seasons
