= Eunice Kennedy Shriver Stadium =

Stadium in Brockport, New York

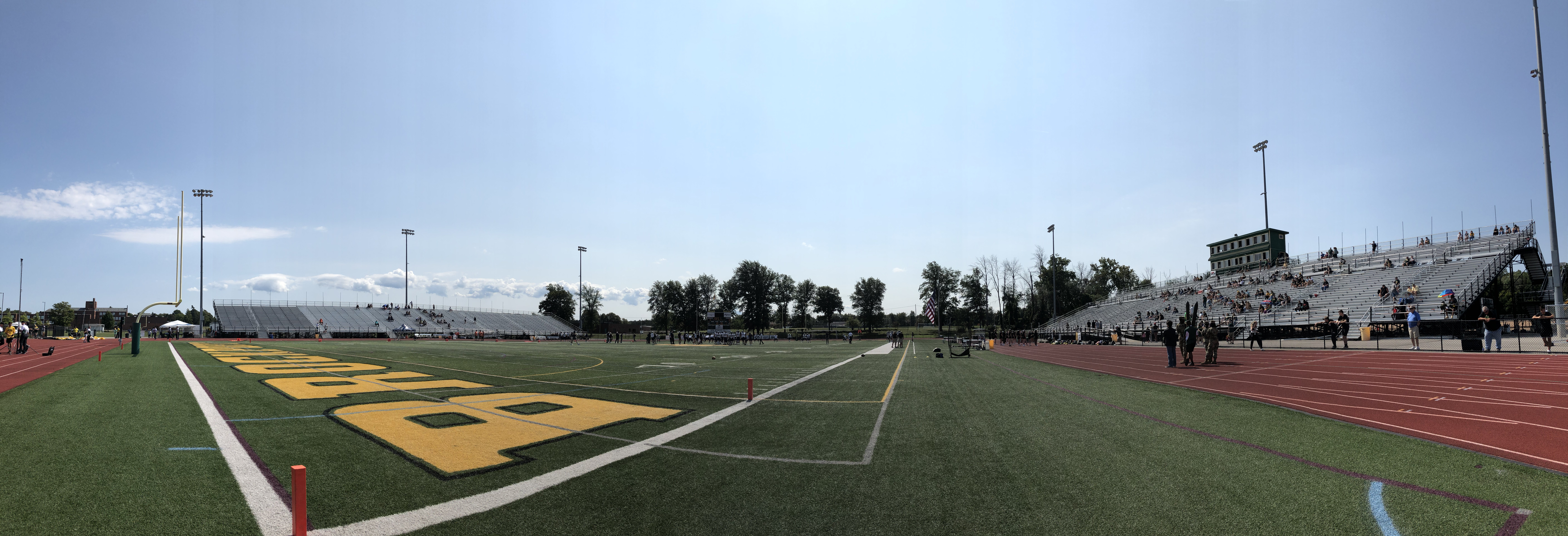
- Eunice Kennedy Shriver Stadium
- Interactive map of Eunice Kennedy Shriver Stadium
- Former names: Special Olympics Stadium
- Location: 350 New Campus Drive; Brockport, NY 14420
- Coordinates: 43°12′23″N 77°57′5″W
- Owner: The College at Brockport, State University of New York
- Capacity: 11,000

Construction
- Opened: 1979

Tenants
- Brockport Golden Eagles (NCAA D-III) (1979–present); Rochester Dragons (AUDL) (2014); Rochester Rattlers (MLL) (2015); Rochester River DogZ FC (NPSL) (2016)

The Eunice Kennedy Shriver Stadium (formerly Special Olympics Stadium) is a stadium in Brockport, New York. Located on the campus of State University of New York College at Brockport it is primarily used by the Brockport Golden Eagles. The stadium holds 11,000 people and was built in 1979. It was originally built for the 1979 Special Olympics World Summer Games that were held in Brockport. Brockport's American football, field hockey, men's and women's soccer, lacrosse and outdoor track and field teams host their home games at Eunice Kennedy Shriver Stadium. The Rochester River Dogz FC soccer club played here in 2016.

== Events ==
- In 1979, the Special Olympics World Summer Games were held here.
- In 1997, the U.S women's soccer team played a friendly match vs. the Rochester Ravens in front of 9,131 spectators. Team USA won 8–0.
- In 2014, it served as the home venue of the Rochester Dragons of the American Ultimate Disc League.
- The Rochester Rattlers of the Major League Lacrosse played here during the 2015 season.
- The stadium hosted the New York State Special Olympics in 2015 and 2016.

Preceded by Sahlen's Stadium	Home of the Rochester Rattlers; 2015 – present	Succeeded by Current
