= Marist Red Foxes football =

Intercollegiate American football team for the Marist University

2026 Marist Red Foxes football team
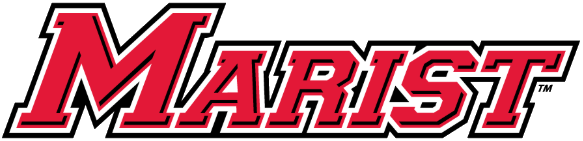
- First season: 1965; 61 years ago
- Athletic director: Tim Murray
- Head coach: Mike Willis; 2nd season, 6–17 (.261)
- Location: Poughkeepsie, New York, United States
- Stadium: Tenney Stadium at Leonidoff Field (capacity: 5,000)
- NCAA division: Division I FCS
- Conference: Pioneer Football League
- Colors: Red and white
- All-time record: 264–298–6 (.470)
- Bowl record: 1–0 (1.000)

Conference championships
- ACFC: 1990 MAAC: 1994, 2006, 2007 PFL: 2013

Uniforms
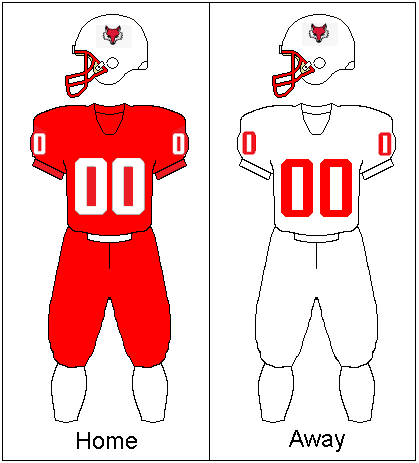
- Fight song: Marist Fight Song
- Mascot: Frankie
- Marching band: Marist Band
- Website: GoRedFoxes.com

The Marist Red Foxes football program is the intercollegiate American football team for Marist University located in the U.S. state of New York. The team competes in the NCAA Division I Football Championship Subdivision (FCS) and are members of the Pioneer Football League. Marist's first football team was fielded in 1965. The team plays its home games at the 5,000 seat Tenney Stadium at Leonidoff Field in Poughkeepsie, New York. The Red Foxes are coached by Mike Willis.

== History ==
Marist University Football traces its roots back to 1965, when the first team, then a club, posted a 3–3 record under coach Ron Levine. The program would soon become one of the most powerful club programs in the country advancing to two National Title Games (1970 and 1972) while competing in the Eastern Collegiate Club Football League. After 13 seasons of numerous All-America selections and conference crowns, the program was elevated to varsity status in 1978 at the Division III level. The first varsity win was a 14–9 decision over Manhattan College in 1978. The Red Foxes played at the Division III level for the next 15 years, as members of the Metropolitan Conference, the ACFC, and the Liberty Conference. Mike Malet was the first coach of the varsity Red Foxes, holding that position from 1978 to 1988.

In 1993, the football program moved up to Division I-AA and in 1994 became the first Marist athletic team to become a member of the Metro Atlantic Athletic Conference.

The Red Foxes broke into the national spotlight in 1997 by setting national records. The Marist defense set a pair of I-AA records in the fall of 1997, breaking the opponent rushing yards per game and fewest yards allowed per rush marks, that had been held by Florida A&M University. The Red Foxes allowed just 39.8 rush yards a game, eclipsing the 1978 record of 45.4 yards per game. The stingy Marist defense also allowed just 1.2 yards per rush, which snapped the Rattlers 1984 national record of 1.3 yards a carry.

The 1998 campaign saw Marist again ranking among the best in the nation defensively. The Red Foxes ranked second in the nation in pass efficiency at 78.3, and total defense, allowing just 219.6 yards per game. Marist also ranked third in the nation in rushing defense at 73.8 yards per game, and was the sixth-best in the country in points allowed, giving up just 12.9 a game. The offense rewrote 15 school records, six on the legs of the school's all-time single-season touchdown leader (21), the late J.J. Allen.

During 2000 Marist won its 100th game in its 23rd year of varsity competition in a 34–31 win over Wagner College. Marist had a then-program-record 11 athletes named to the All-MAAC teams at the end of the season, and had seven players named All-America recognition from the Football Gazette. It was the Red Foxes' seventh straight winning season.

The team's home, Leonidoff Field, was renovated after the 2006 season and beautiful Tenney Stadium was built around it. Marist played its first post-renovation game there on October 6, 2007, against Duquesne.

In 2008, after the MAAC football conference disbanded, the team joined the Pioneer Football League.

In their first season as a member of the Pioneer Football League (2008), Marist tied a then program record with seven victories, and set a program record with a six-game winning streak. They finished the season 7–4.

In 2010, the Red Foxes set a single-season program record with 2,950 yards through the air. Quarterback Tommy Reilly set the then program's single-game and single-season records for completions, attempts and passing yards.

The 2013 team claimed a share the PFL title, finished 7–1 in PFL play and set a program record for victories; ending the season 8–3 overall. A controversial league tiebreaker gave the PFL's FCS playoff auto-bid to Butler.

In November 2023, Jim Parady announced his retirement after 32 years as head coach.

== Conference affiliations ==
=== Classifications ===
- 1965–1977: Club
- 1978–1992: NCAA Division III
- 1993–present: NCAA Division I–AA / NCAA Division I Football Championship Subdivision (FCS)

=== Conference memberships ===
- 1965–1977: Independent
- 1978–1984: Metropolitan Intercollegiate Conference
- 1985–1988: NCAA Division III independent
- 1989–1991: Atlantic Collegiate Football Conference
- 1992: Liberty Football Conference
- 1993: NCAA Division I–AA Independent
- 1994–2007: Metro Atlantic Athletic Conference
- 2008: NCAA Division I FCS independent
- 2009–present: Pioneer Football League

== Individual single season records ==
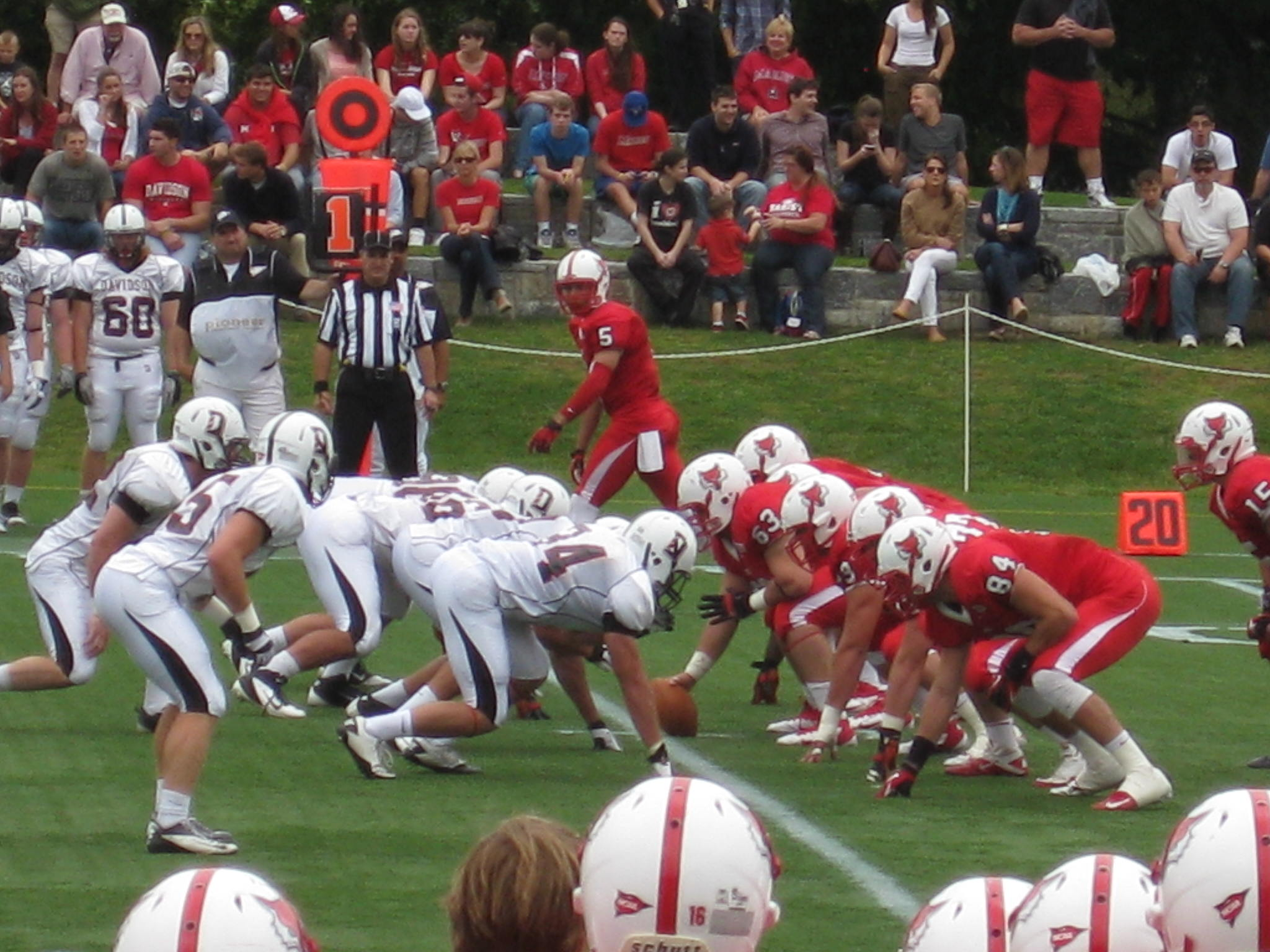
Marist vs Davidson 2012

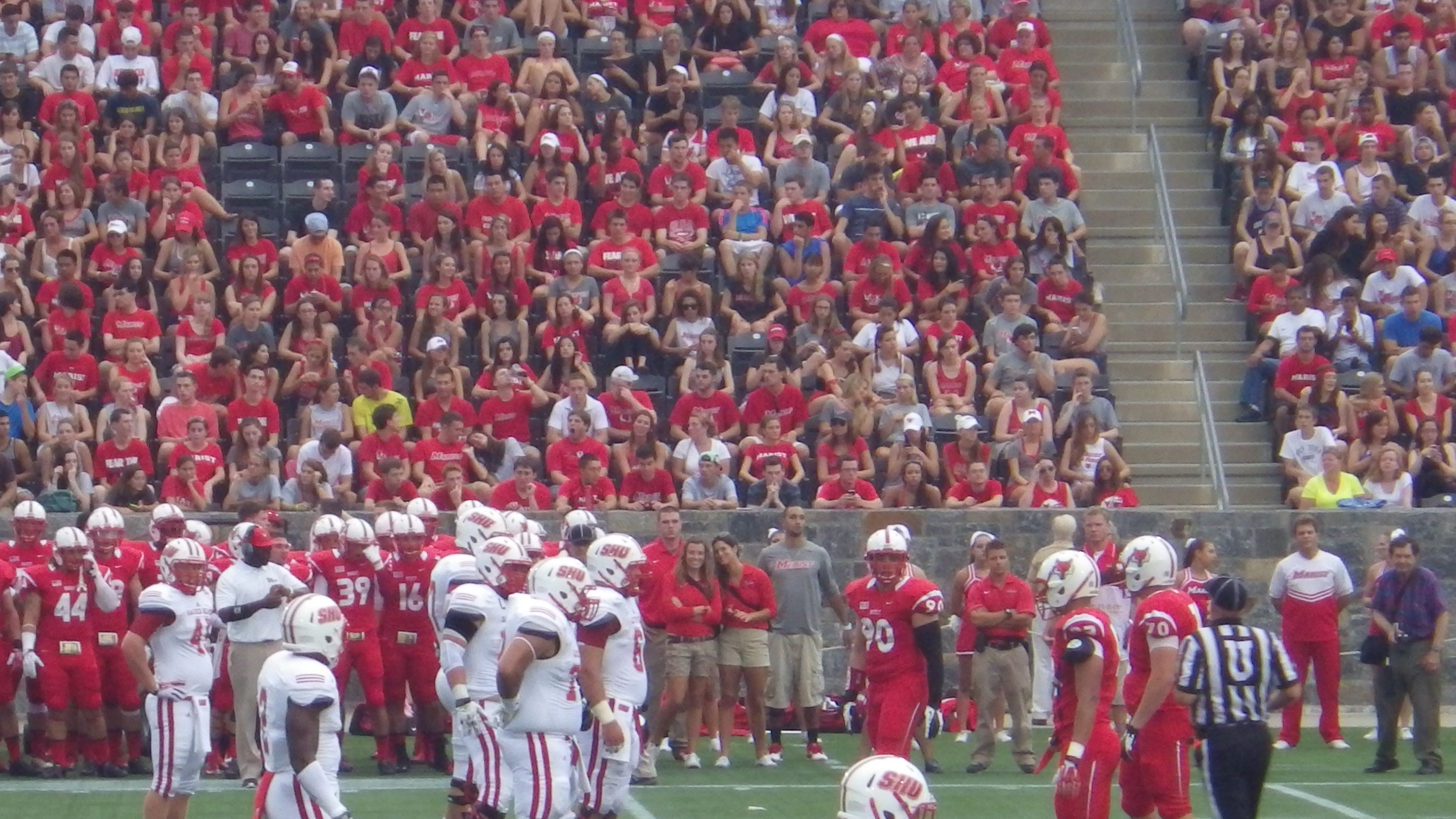
Red Fox fans at Tenney Stadium

Most Passing Yards	Season	Yards
Charles Looney	2013	2,763
Tommy Reilly	2010	2,383

Most Rushing Yards	Season	Yards
J.J. Allen	1998	1,623

Most Receiving Yards	Season	Yards
Michael Rios	2012	1,173
James LaMacchia	2009	1,075

== Notable former players ==
Notable alumni include:

- Jovan Rhodes (RB, 1994–1998) – Finished his career with 3,156 rushing yards, a I-AA record at the time.
- Terrence Fede (DL, 2009–2014) – Drafted #234 overall by the Miami Dolphins, first player drafted in school history. On December 21, 2014, Fede blocked a punt forcing a safety to win the game against the Minnesota Vikings.
- Jason Myers (K, 2009–2012) – Signed as undrafted free agent by the Jacksonville Jaguars on March 3, 2015. Currently the starting kicker for the Seattle Seahawks. Made the 2019 Pro Bowl, and the 2022 Pro Bowl. Set record for most field goals during a Super Bowl with 5 successfully made during Super Bowl LX in 2026.
- Sean Stellato (WR, 1998–2001) – Played arena football for the Florida Firecats and the Memphis Xplorers before transitioning to a sports agent. Stellato founded SES Sports in 2013.

== Head coaches ==
- Ron Levine (1965–1977); record: 59–31–3 (.651)
- Mike Malet (1978–1988); record: 31–68 (.313)
- Rick Pardy (1989–1991); record: 18–11–2 (.613)
- Jim Parady (1992–2023; record 155–171–1 (.476)
- Mike Willis (2024–present; record 6–17 (.261)

== Championships ==
=== Conference championships ===
Years	Conference	Coach	Overall Record	Conference Record
1990	Atlantic Collegiate Football Conference	Rick Pardy	7–2–1	5–0
1994†	Metro Atlantic Athletic Conference	Jim Parady	7–3	6–1
2006†	Metro Atlantic Athletic Conference	Jim Parady	4–7	3–1
2007†	Metro Atlantic Athletic Conference	Jim Parady	3–8	2–1
2013†	Pioneer Football League	Jim Parady	8–3	7–1

† denotes co-champion

=== Bowl games ===
Date played	Bowl	Champion		Runner-Up	
1990	ACFC Bowl	Marist	40	Brooklyn	0

== Future non-conference opponents ==
Announced schedules as of March 19, 2026.

2026	2027	2028	2029	2030	2031	2032
at New Haven	New Haven	at New Haven	New Haven	at New Haven	New Haven	at New Haven
Franklin Pierce	Lafayette					
at Lafayette						
Columbia						
