= Garrett–Harrison Stadium =

Garrett-Harrison Stadium
- Interactive map of Garrett-Harrison Stadium
- Address: 3800 Summerville Road
- Location: Phenix City, Alabama, U.S.
- Coordinates: 32.498°N 85.015°W
- Elevation: 500 feet (150 m) AMSL
- Owner: City of Phenix City
- Capacity: 10,000
- Surface: Artificial turf

Tenants
- Central High School Red Devils; NCAA Division III Football Championship (1973–1982, 1985–1989)

Website
- www.phenixcityal.us

Garrett–Harrison Stadium is a high school football stadium in the southeastern United States, located in Phenix City, Russell County, Alabama. Owned by the city, it is the home stadium for Central High School Red Devils.

Most notably, it hosted college football's NCAA Division III championship game (also known as the Amos Alonzo Stagg Bowl) from 1973 to 1982 and again from 1985 to 1989. In 2014, Tuskegee and Albany State played a neutral-site game at the stadium called the White Water Classic. It was the first college football game at the stadium since the last Division III championship held at Garrett-Harrison in 1989.
