= Atlantic Collegiate Football Conference =

Defunct NCAA Division III athletic conference

The Atlantic Collegiate Football Conference was a short-lived NCAA Division III football conference composed of member schools located in the Northeastern United States. The league existed from 1988 to 1991.

== Champions ==
- 1988 – Gallaudet (4–0)
- 1989 – Gallaudet and St. John Fisher (4–1)
- 1990 – Marist (5–0)
- 1991 – Saint Francis (PA) (3–0)

== Yearly standings ==
1988 Atlantic Collegiate Football Conference standings
	Conf.					Overall
Team	W		L		T	W		L		T
Gallaudet $	4	–	0	–	0	6	–	3	–	0
St. John Fisher	3	–	1	–	0	5	–	4	–	0
Siena	2	–	2	–	0	3	–	6	–	0
Brooklyn	1	–	3	–	0	1	–	6	–	0
Maritime	0	–	4	–	0	0	–	6	–	0
$ – Conference champion

1989 Atlantic Collegiate Football Conference standings
	Conf.					Overall
Team	W		L		T	W		L		T
Gallaudet +	4	–	1	–	0	7	–	3	–	0
St. John Fisher +	4	–	1	–	0	6	–	4	–	0
Marist	3	–	2	–	0	4	–	5	–	1
Saint Francis (PA)	2	–	3	–	0	2	–	8	–	0
Siena	2	–	3	–	0	2	–	8	–	0
Brooklyn	0	–	5	–	0	1	–	5	–	0
+ – Conference co-champions

1990 Atlantic Collegiate Football Conference standings
	Conf.					Overall
Team	W		L		T	W		L		T
Marist $	5	–	0	–	0	7	–	2	–	1
Saint Francis (PA)	4	–	1	–	0	4	–	6	–	0
St. John Fisher	3	–	2	–	0	3	–	7	–	0
Brooklyn	1	–	4	–	0	2	–	6	–	0
Gallaudet	1	–	4	–	0	1	–	8	–	0
Siena	1	–	4	–	0	1	–	8	–	0
$ – Conference champion

1991 Atlantic Collegiate Football Conference standings
	Conf.					Overall
Team	W		L		T	W		L		T
Saint Francis (PA) $	3	–	0	–	0	6	–	3	–	0
Marist	2	–	1	–	0	6	–	4	–	0
Gallaudet	1	–	2	–	0	1	–	7	–	1
St. John Fisher	0	–	3	–	0	0	–	9	–	0
$ – Conference champion

== See also ==
- List of defunct college football conferences
