= Brockport Golden Eagles football =

- First season: 1947; 79 years ago
- Athletic director: Erick Hart
- Head coach: Jason Mangone; 12th season, 96–38 (.716)
- Stadium: Eunice Kennedy Shriver Stadium (capacity: 10,000)
- Location: Brockport, New York
- NCAA division: Division III
- Conference: Empire 8
- Bowl record: 5–3 (.625)

Conference championships
- 4

Conference division championships
- 1
- Consensus All-Americans: 53
- Colors: Green and gold
- Mascot: 1
- Website: gobrockport.com

The Brockport Golden Eagles football program is the intercollegiate American football team for the State University of New York at Brockport located in the U.S. state of New York. The team competes in NCAA Division III and are members of the Empire 8. The team plays its home games at the 10,000 seat Eunice Kennedy Shriver Stadium in Brockport, New York. The Golden Eagles are coached by Jason Mangone. Brockport participates yearly in the Courage Bowl.

== History ==
Brockport Golden Eagles football began in 1947 after the end of WWII, when veterans returning from the war began to attend the college on the GI Bill. Many of these young people had gone off to the war right after high school or during high school and wanted to have a true college experience complete with athletic teams. The first football team included center Louis F. Avino, who also came up with the team's Golden Eagles mascot. The team was led by Bob Boozer who went on to a long career as an educator and coach at Brockport, the athletic field at Special Olympic Stadium was named Bob Boozer Field in his honor in 2006. The original locker room was a cold room located under the stairwell in Heartwell Hall. Brockport made it to the NCAA Division III postseason for the first time in school history in 2000 and went four consecutive times under head coach Rocco Salomone's lead. In 2002, Brockport made it all the way to the NCAA quarterfinals before losing to John Carroll in overtime. After a 15 year drought, the Golden Eagles qualified for the 2017 NCAA Division III Playoffs following an undefeated regular season. In 2018, the Golden Eagles would once again go undefeated in the regular season and qualify for the 2018 NCAA Division III Playoffs. In 2019, the Golden Eagles would once again find their way to the 2019 NCAA Division III Playoffs with a win against Western New England in the first round. They would advance to play Muhlenberg in the second round, which they would lose. In 2021, the Golden Eagles earned a ECAC bowl bid to play in the ECAC Clayton Chapman Bowl. They played Washington & Jefferson on November 20, 2021. They came away from the game with a 20–7 victory. In 2022, the Golden Eagles earned another ECAC Clayton Chapman Bowl bid, however it would later be canceled due to inclement weather in the area. In 2023, the Golden Eagles earned their third straight ECAC Bowl bid, this time playing in the ECAC Asa S. Bushnell Bowl losing against Carnegie Mellon.

History in the NCAA Division III Playoffs
Year	NCAA Division	Coach	Record	Playoffs	Opponent	PF	PA	Location
2000	III	Rocco Salomone	8–1	2000 NCAA Division III Playoffs Second Round	Springfield	6	13	Eunice Kennedy Shriver Stadium
2001	III	Rocco Salomone	9–2	2001 NCAA Division III Playoffs First Round	Rowan	17	40	Glassboro, New Jersey
2002	III	Rocco Salomone	9–2	2002 NCAA Division III Playoffs First Round	Springfield	16	0	Eunice Kennedy Shriver Stadium
2002	III	Rocco Salomone	10–2	2002 NCAA Division III Playoffs Second Round	Rowan	15	12	Glassboro, New Jersey
2002	III	Rocco Salomone	10–3	2002 NCAA Division III Playoffs Quarterfinals	John Carroll	10	16	Rochester, New York
2003	III	Rocco Salomone	9–2	2003 NCAA Division III Playoffs First Round	Ithaca	9	14	Eunice Kennedy Shriver Stadium
2017	III	Jason Mangone	11–0	2017 NCAA Division III Playoffs First Round	Plymouth State	66	0	Eunice Kennedy Shriver Stadium
2017	III	Jason Mangone	12–0	2017 NCAA Division III Playoffs Second Round	Wesley	49	28	Eunice Kennedy Shriver Stadium
2017	III	Jason Mangone	13–0	2017 NCAA Division III Playoffs Quarterfinals	Delaware Valley	31	28	Doylestown, Pennsylvania
2017	III	Jason Mangone	13–1	2017 NCAA Division III Playoffs Semifinals	Mary Hardin–Baylor	0	24	Belton, Texas
2018	III	Jason Mangone	11–0	2018 NCAA Division III Playoffs First Round	Framingham State	40	27	Eunice Kennedy Shriver Stadium
2018	III	Jason Mangone	11–1	2018 NCAA Division III Playoffs Second Round	RPI	13	21	Eunice Kennedy Shriver Stadium
2019	III	Jason Mangone	9–2	2019 NCAA Division III Playoffs First Round	Western New England	33	28	Springfield, MA
2019	III	Jason Mangone	9–3	2019 NCAA Division III Playoffs Second Round	Muhlenberg	0	42	Allentown, Pennsylvania
Total NCAA Playoff Games				14

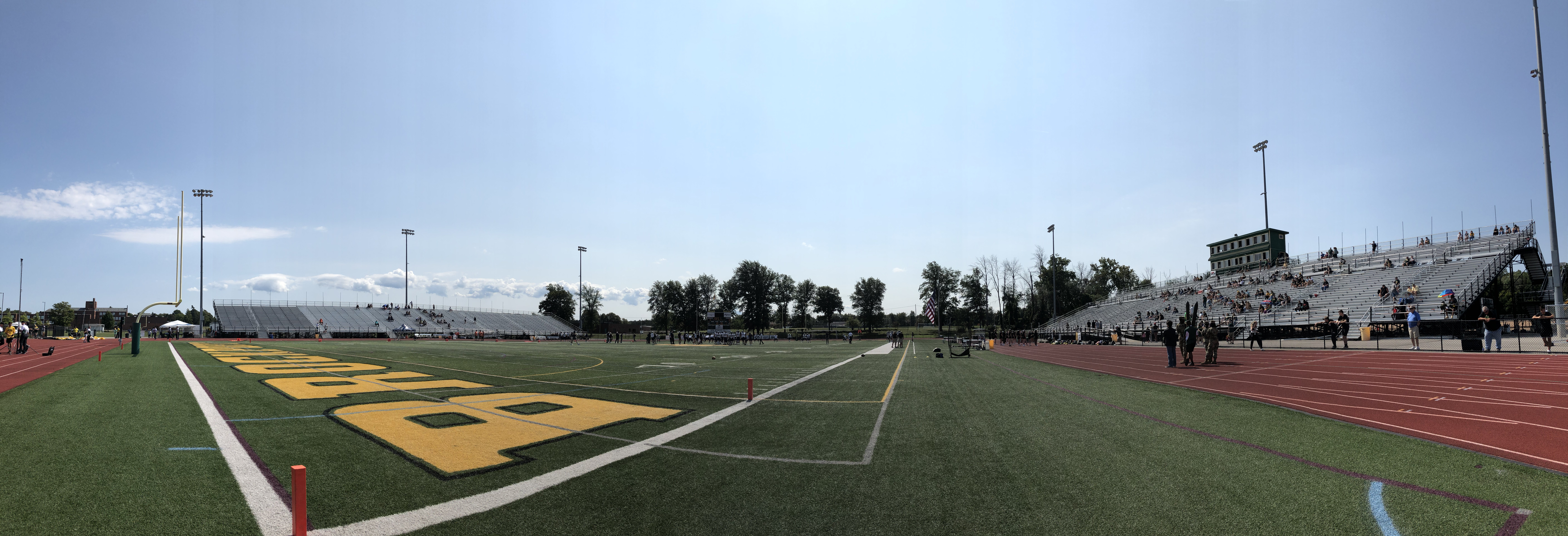
Eunice Kennedy Shriver Stadium

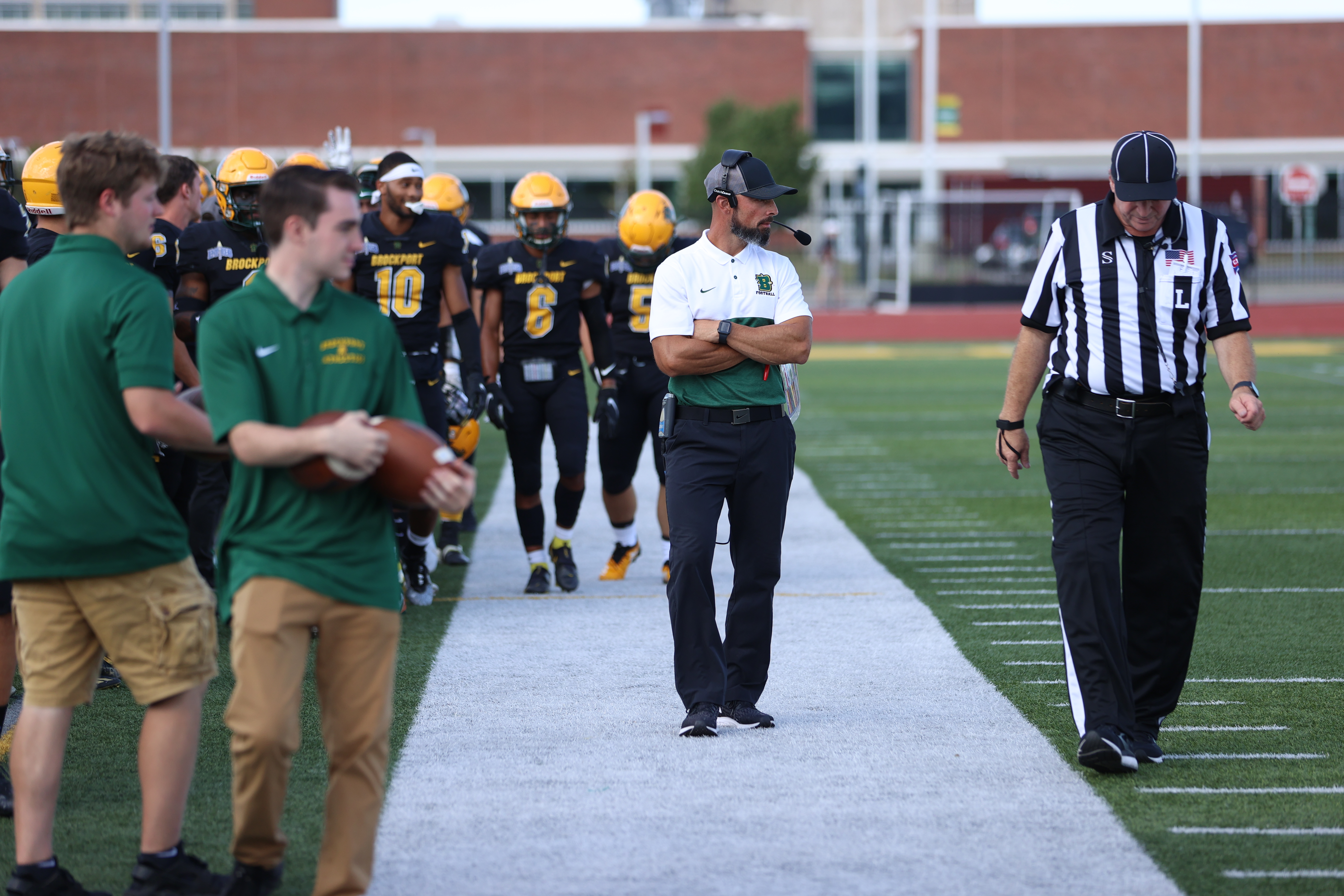
Brockport Head Coach Jason Mangone

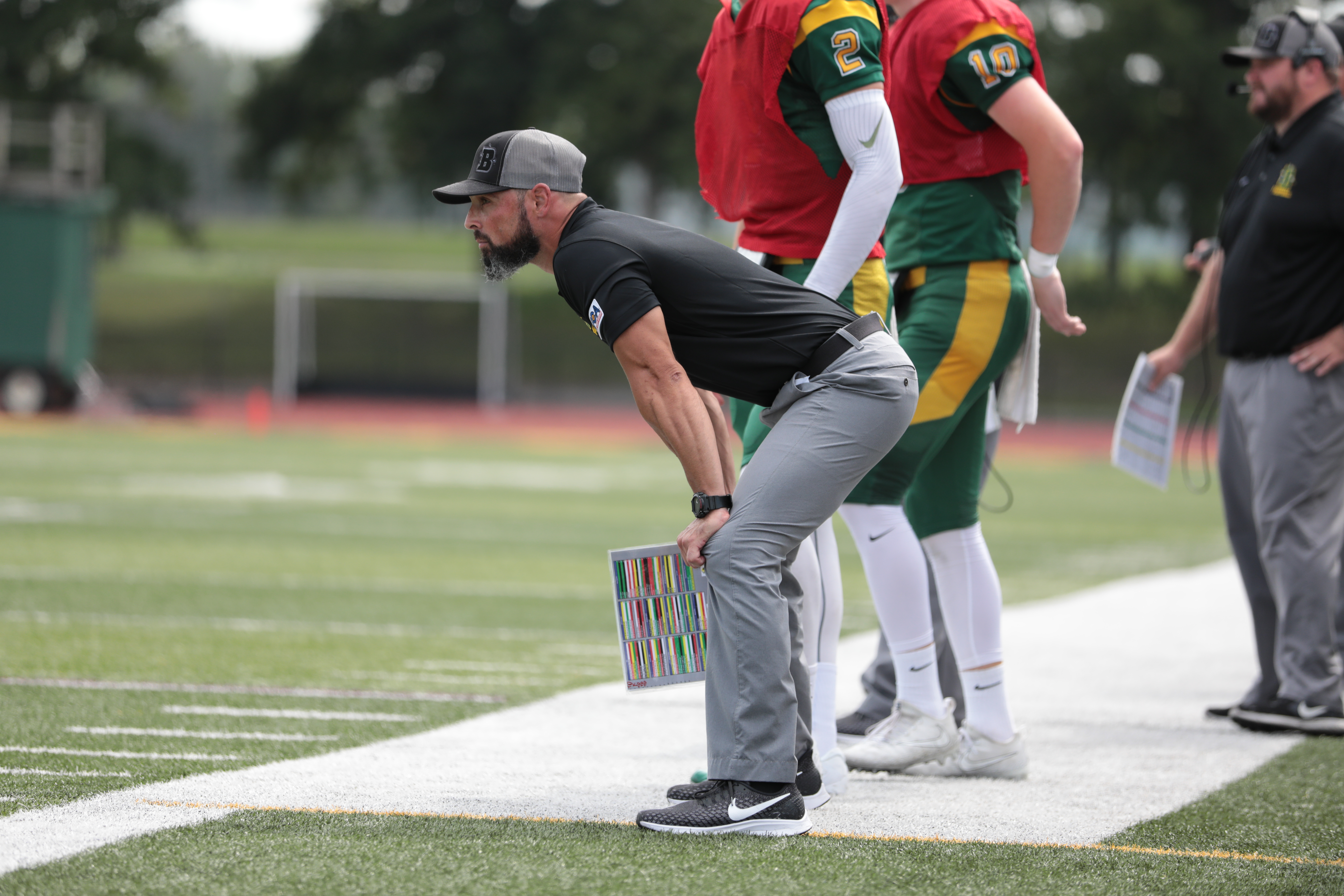
Brockport Head Coach Jason Mangone

ECAC Bowl Games
Year	Coach	Record	Box Score	Opponent	PF	PA	Location
1993	Ed Matejkovic	7–4	—	Maine Maritime	20	28	Ritchie Field
2008	Rocco Salomone	7–4	—	Hartwick	70	68	Eunice Kennedy Shriver Stadium
2013	Jason Mangone	8–3		Waynesburg	19	12	Eunice Kennedy Shriver Stadium
2016	Jason Mangone	7–4		Washington & Jefferson	31	38	Franklin Field
2021	Jason Mangone	8–3		Washington & Jefferson	20	7	Eunice Kennedy Shriver Stadium
2022	Jason Mangone	7–3	—	Westminster (PA)	Canceled		Eunice Kennedy Shriver Stadium
2023	Jason Mangone	8–3		Carnegie Mellon	7	37	Gesling Stadium
2024	Jason Mangone	8–3		Rochester	42	23	Eunice Kennedy Shriver Stadium
2025	Jason Mangone	7–4		Geneva	46	10	Eunice Kennedy Shriver Stadium

== Notable former players ==
Notable alumni include:

- Bob Casullo, assistant coach, Oakland Raiders, New York Jets, Seattle Seahawks, Tampa Bay Buccaneers (2000–2008)
- Mike Jones, linebacker, Buffalo Bills (1987)
- Josh Warner, center, Chicago Bears (2002–2003)
- Jay Johnson, linebacker, Rhein Fire (2003)
- Courtlan Green, Wide Receiver, Defensive Back Rochester Brigade (AF2) (2001)
- Justus Galac, strength and conditioning coach, New York Jets (2012–2020)
- Scott Kaniecki, defensive assistant, Cleveland Browns (2018)
- Jordan Hogan, coaching assistant, Arizona Cardinals (2021)

== Year-by-year results ==
Statistics correct as of the end of the 2025 college football season

NCAA Division III playoff berth	Bowl game berth	Conference champion	Division champion	Undefeated season

Year	NCAA Division	Conference	Overall					Conference						Coach
Year	NCAA Division	Conference	Games	Win	Loss	Tie	Pct.	Games	Win	Loss	Tie	Pct.	Standing	Coach
2004	III	ACFC	10	6	4	0	.600	5	3	2	0	.600	3rd	Rocco Salomone
2005	III	ACFC	10	5	5	0	.500	5	4	1	0	.800	3rd	Rocco Salomone
2006	III	ACFC	10	4	6	0	.400	4	2	2	0	.500	T–4th	Rocco Salomone
2007	III	ACFC	10	5	5	0	.500	4	2	2	0	.500	3rd	Rocco Salomone
2008	III	NJAC	11	7	4	0	.636	9	6	3	0	.667	T–4th	Rocco Salomone
2009	III	NJAC	10	4	6	0	.400	9	3	6	0	.333	T–6th	Rocco Salomone
2010	III	NJAC	10	2	8	0	.200	9	2	7	0	.222	T–8th	Rocco Salomone
2011	III	NJAC	10	3	7	0	.300	9	3	6	0	.333	T–7th	Rocco Salomone
2012	III	NJAC	10	6	4	0	.600	8	4	4	0	.500	5th	Rocco Salomone
2013	III	NJAC	11	8	3	0	.727	7	6	1	0	.857	1st	Jason Mangone
2014	III	Empire 8	10	5	5	0	.500	8	3	5	0	.375	6th	Jason Mangone
2015	III	Empire 8	10	5	5	0	.500	8	3	5	0	.375	7th	Jason Mangone
2016	III	Empire 8	11	7	4	0	.636	8	6	2	0	.750	3rd	Jason Mangone
2017	III	Empire 8	14	13	1	0	.929	7	7	0	0	1.000	1st	Jason Mangone
2018	III	Empire 8	12	11	1	0	.917	7	7	0	0	1.000	1st	Jason Mangone
2019	III	Empire 8	12	9	3	0	.750	6	5	1	0	.833	1st	Jason Mangone
2021	III	Empire 8	11	8	3	0	.727	6	4	2	0	.667	T–2nd	Jason Mangone
2022 (Note: The ECAC Clayton Chapman Bowl would be canceled due to inclement weather in the area.)	III	Empire 8	10	7	3	0	.700	6	4	2	0	.667	2nd	Jason Mangone
2023	III	Empire 8	11	8	3	0	.727	6	5	1	0	.833	2nd	Jason Mangone
2024	III	Empire 8	11	8	3	0	.727	7	5	2	0	.714	T–2nd	Jason Mangone
2025	III	Empire 8	11	7	4	0	.636	7	4	3	0	.571	4th	Jason Mangone
Totals			225	138	87	0	.613	145	88	57	0	.607		

== Championships ==
=== Conference championships ===
Year	Conference	Coach	Overall record	Conference record
2013	NJAC	Jason Mangone	8–3	6–1
2017	Empire 8	Jason Mangone	13–1	7–0
2018	Empire 8	Jason Mangone	11–1	7–0
2019	Empire 8	Jason Mangone	9–3	5–1
Total conference championships			4
